= Asia Song Festival =

Pop music festival

- 2023 official poster
- Genre: Pop music
- Dates: September/October
- Locations: Yeouido Park, Yeouido-dong, Yeongdeungpo District, Seoul, South Korea
- Coordinates: 37°33′36″N 126°59′24″E
- Years active: 2004 – present
- Organiser: Korea Foundation for International Culture Exchange (KOFICE)
- Website: asiasongfestival.kr

Asia Song Festival

Chinese name
- Traditional Chinese: 亞洲音樂節
- Simplified Chinese: 亚洲音乐节
Transcriptions
Standard Mandarin
- Hanyu Pinyin: Yǎ zhōu yīn yuè jié
- Bopomofo: ㄧㄚˇ ㄓㄡ ㄧㄣ ㄩㄝˋ ㄐㄧㄝˊ
- Wade–Giles: Ya^{3} chou^{1} yin^{1} yüeh^{4} chieh^{2}
- IPA: [jà ʈʂóʊ ín ɥê tɕjě]
Yue: Cantonese
- Yale Romanization: A jāu yām ngohk jit
- Jyutping: aa3 zau1 jam1 ngok6 zit3

Vietnamese name
- Vietnamese: Liên hoan bài hát Châu Á

Korean name
- Hangul: 아시아송페스티벌
Transcriptions
- Revised Romanization: Asia Song Peseutibeol

Japanese name
- Kana: アジア・ソング・フェスティバル

Indonesian name
- Indonesian: Festival Lagu Asia

Asia Song Festival, a.k.a. A-Song-Fe or ASF, is an annual Asian pop music festival held in South Korea, since 2004. It is hosted by Korea Foundation for International Culture Exchange (KOFICE) and features artists from Asian countries. Participating artists are awarded a plaque of appreciation by the Korean Ministry of Culture, Sports and Tourism and Best Asian Artist by the chairman of Korea Foundation for International Culture and Exchange (KOFICE). South Korean boy band TVXQ is the only act to have participated for five consecutive years, since the 1st festival in 2004.

This festival is recorded and broadcast on Seoul Broadcasting System in Korea and Fuji TV in Japan; and other major broadcasting stations around the world including United States, China, Hong Kong, Taiwan, Thailand, Malaysia, Indonesia, Brunei, the Philippines, Finland, Bulgaria, Vietnam and Singapore.

The theme song for the 2011 Festival "Dreams Come True", a duet by Lee Donghae of Super Junior and Seohyun of Girls' Generation was released on 11 October 2011 as a digital single. The proceeds from the sale were donated to Unicef to help children in African countries.

== History ==
Year	Date	Venue	MC(s)	Performers
2004	16 November	Olympic Gymnastics Arena	—N/a	South Korea: BoA, TVXQ; Japan: Ayumi Hamasaki; China: Sun Nan, Yang Kun; Taiwan: F4; Hong Kong: Leon Lai; Thailand: Palmy; Vietnam: Mỹ Tâm
2005	11 November	Busan Sajik Baseball Stadium	—N/a	South Korea: Jang Na-ra, TVXQ, Lee Jung-hyun; Japan: Maki Goto, Nanase Aikawa; China: Cui Jian, Yu Quan; Taiwan: Alec Su; Hong Kong: Kelly Chen; Thailand: Lanna Commins; Vietnam: My Linh
2006	22 September	Gwangju World Cup Stadium	—N/a	South Korea: TVXQ, Buzz; Japan: Arashi, Koda Kumi; China: Sun Nan; Taiwan: Tank; Hong Kong: Kelly Chen; Thailand: Katreeya English; Vietnam: Hồ Quỳnh Hương; Philippines: Kitchie Nadal; Singapore: Tanya Chua; Mongolia: Three Girls
2007	22 September	Seoul World Cup Stadium	Eugene and Choi Ki-hwan	South Korea: TVXQ, Super Junior, Lee Hyori, SG Wannabe; Japan: Mai Kuraki; China: Zhao Wei; Taiwan: A-Mei, F4; Hong Kong: Gigi Leung; Thailand: Golf & Mike, Ruangsak Loychusak; Vietnam: Lam Trường; Philippines: Barbie Almalbis; Indonesia: Peterpan
2008	3–4 October	Seoul World Cup Stadium	—N/a	South Korea: Shinee, 2AM, 2PM, Brown Eyed Girls, U-KISS, TVXQ, Girls' Generation, Shin Seung-hun, SS501; Japan: Berryz Kobo, W-inds, Anna Tsuchiya; China: Anson Hu; Taiwan: Yoga Lin, Fahrenheit; Hong Kong: Karen Mok; Vietnam: Hồ Quỳnh Hương; Singapore: Jocie Kok; Mongolia: BX; Thailand: PECK, ICE; Malaysia: Rynn Lim; Philippines: Rivermaya; Indonesia: Agnez Mo
2009	19 September	Seoul World Cup Stadium	—N/a	South Korea: Big Bang, 2NE1, Girls' Generation, Kara, Super Junior; Japan: Gackt, Mihimaru GT, V6; Hong Kong: Ekin Cheng; China: Li Yu-chun; Taiwan: Show Lo; Thailand: K-Otic; Vietnam: Hồ Ngọc Hà; Indonesia: Agnez Mo; Ukraine: Ruslana (special guest)
2010	23 October	Seoul Olympic Stadium	—N/a	South Korea: BoA, Rain, Kara, Lee Seung-chul, 2AM, Beast, 4Minute; Japan: AKB48; Taiwan: Joe Cheng; China: Jane Zhang; Malaysia: Michael Wong; Thailand: Sukrit Wisetkaew
2011	15 October	Daegu Stadium	—N/a	South Korea: Super Junior, Girls' Generation, Miss A, Lee Seung-gi, Beast, U-Kiss, G.NA; Japan: Perfume, AAA; Taiwan: Peter Ho; Hong Kong: Leo Ku; China: Bibi Zhou; Thailand: Tata Young
2012	4 August	Yeosu Expo Plaza	—N/a	South Korea: Kim Hyun-joong, Tiger JK, Yoon Mi-rae, MBLAQ, Sistar, Teen Top, ZE:A, Ailee, B1A4; Japan: Aqua Timez; China: Vision Wei; Singapore: Fann Wong; Taiwan: Yoga Lin; Thailand: Candy Mafia
2013	9 October	Jamsil Olympic Main Stadium	Eunhyuk, Ok Taec-yeon, and Kris Wu	South Korea: Girl's Day, 2PM, Crayon Pop, ZE:A, Block B, Dynamic Duo, Exo, No Brain, Idiotape, Shu-I & DJ Koo; Philippines: MYMP; Japan: Thelma Aoyama; Hong Kong: G.E.M.
2014	2 November	Busan Asiad Main Stadium	Leeteuk, Zico, and Minah	South Korea: EXO-K, Girl's Day, Block B, Teen Top, Henry, Fly to the Sky, Red Velvet; Philippines: Kyla; Indonesia: Afgansyah Reza; China: Zhou Mi; Taiwan: Dream Girls; Japan: Shokichi & DJ Hal
2015	11 October	Busan Asiad Main Stadium	Leeteuk, Hani, and Hong Jong-hyun	South Korea: Exo, BTS, Got7, B1A4, Red Velvet; Philippines: Sabrina; Japan: NGT48; Hong Kong: William Chan
2016	9 October	Busan Asiad Main Stadium	Leeteuk, and Fei	South Korea: Exo, Seventeen, Twice, NCT, Simon Dominic, Mamamoo; Vietnam: Noo Phước Thịnh; Singapore: Gentle Bones; Japan: Katahira Rina; China: Sean Li
2017	24 September	Busan Asiad Main Stadium	Leeteuk, and Jackson	South Korea: Dynamic Duo, Exo, Mamamoo, the East Light, Taeyeon, Ailee, KARD; Indonesia: Mocca, Shae; Philippines: Morissette; Singapore: MICappella; Japan: Mika Nakashima; Vietnam: Dương Hoàng Yến, Đông Nhi, Erik; Sweden: Zara Larsson (special guest)
2018	2–3 October	Busan Asiad Main Stadium	Leeteuk	South Korea: NU'EST-W, The Boyz, YDPP, MXM, Jeong Se-woon, Red Velvet, Momoland, Bewhy, Seventeen, Wanna One, Fromis 9; Taiwan: C.T.O, Show Lo; Japan: Sudannayuzuyully, E-girls; Philippines: Morissette; Vietnam: Vũ Cát Tường
2019	11–12 October	Ulsan Stadium	Chani, Hyunjin, and Yeji	South Korea: Winner, April, Eric Nam, UV, Sunmi, Kei, Ha Sung-woon, Kim Jae-hwan, N.Flying, ONF, Jeong Se-woon, Stray Kids, Itzy, the Boyz, Ateez, AB6IX, Dreamcatcher, Jang Woo-hyuk; Thailand: Jannine Weigel; Philippines: BRWN; Malaysia: Alvin Chong; Vietnam: Vũ Cát Tường; Australia: Dami Im
2020	10 October	Gyeongju	Doyoung and Yeeun	South Korea: Kang Daniel, Red Velvet – Irene & Seulgi, YooA, Momoland, Ateez, iKon, the Boyz, AB6IX, WEi, Secret Number, Oneus, UNVS, Moonbin & Sanha, Ha Sung-woon, GFriend, Everglow; Myanmar: Project K; India: When Chai Met Toast; China: S.K.Y.; Japan: AKB48; Vietnam: Trọng Hiếu; Thailand: Milli
2021	9 October	Gyeongju	Sandara Park and BamBam	South Korea: Brave Girls, Moonbin & Sanha, NCT Dream, Pentagon, Everglow, AB6IX, Weeekly, Omega X; Japan: Nona Diamonds; China: Cheng Chuang, Yu Zijun x Zhang Ziwei; Thailand: Suppasit Jongcheveevat; Vietnam: O2O Girl Band, Super V; Malaysia: Vanessa Reynauld; Indonesia: Anneth Delliecia
2022	14 October	Yeouido Park	Lee Dae-hwi and Seunghee	South Korea: Oh My Girl, SF9, Gray; Japan: iamSHUM; Philippines: 4th Impact; Vietnam: Ha Le, Uyên Linh; Indonesia: Samuel Cipta; Thailand: Roseberry; Kazakhstan: Turan
2023	8 to 10 September	Yeouido Park	Lee Dae-hwi Kim Chae-hyeon and Mashiro (Kep1er)	Vietnam: Pháo; Japan: Chai, Salasa; Thailand: FYEQOODGURL; United Arab Emirates: Rashid Al-Nuaimi; India: Kayan; Indonesia: StarBe; South Korea: AB6IX, Kep1er
2024	26 October	Hangang Park	Jaeyun and Lee Sae-rom	Japan: Tomioka Ai; Jamaica: Jah Lil; Philippines: Dionela; Vietnam: Mỹ Anh; Thailand: WIM; Indonesia: Afgan; South Korea: Fromis 9, Balming Tiger, QWER, 8Turn
2025				
2026				

== Awards ==
=== Best New Asian Artist ===
Year	Country	Performer(s)
2005	South Korea	Eru
2006	South Korea	SeeYa
2007	South Korea	F.T. Island
2007	Thailand	Ruangsak Loychusak
2008	South Korea	Shinee
2008	Japan	Berryz Kobo
2009	South Korea	2NE1
2011	South Korea	Miss A
2012	South Korea	B1A4 and Ailee

=== Asia Influential Artist ===
Year	Country	Performer(s)
2010	South Korea	Beast and 4Minute
2011	South Korea	U-KISS and G.NA

=== Best Asian Artist ===
Year	Country	Performer(s)
2008	South Korea	Girls' Generation
2012	South Korea	Kim Hyun-joong
2012	Singapore	Fann Wong

== Participating countries ==
Asian countries
Country	Appearances	No. of performers
South Korea	21	149
Japan	20	30
Thailand	15	17
Vietnam	15	17
China	13	15
Taiwan	11	14
Philippines	11	11
Hong Kong	9	8
Indonesia	9	10
Singapore	5	5
Malaysia	4	4
India	2	2
Mongolia	2	2
Kazakhstan	1	1
Myanmar	1	1
United Arab Emirates	1	1

Non-Asian countries
Country	Appearances	No. of performers
Australia	1	1
Jamaica	1	1
Sweden	1	1
Ukraine	1	1

== See also ==
- List of music festivals in South Korea
