= Lee Dae-hwi =

South Korean singer (born 2001)

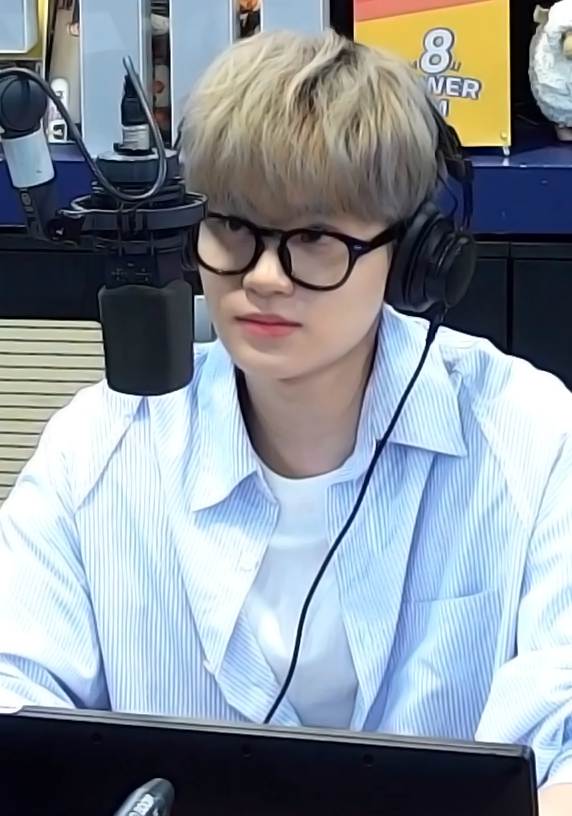
- Lee in April 2022
- Born: January 29, 2001 (age 25); Seoul, South Korea
- Education: School of Performing Arts Seoul – Department of Stage Arts
- Occupations: Singer; songwriter; record producer; television personality; actor
- Years active: 2017–present
- Musical career
- Genre: K-pop
- Instrument: Vocals
- Labels: Brand New; Warner Korea; YMC (Note: As a member of Wanna One only.); Swing
- Member of: AB6IX
- Formerly of: Wanna One
- Website: Official website

Korean name
- Hangul: 이대휘
- Hanja: 李大輝
- RR: I Daehwi
- MR: I Taehwi

Signature
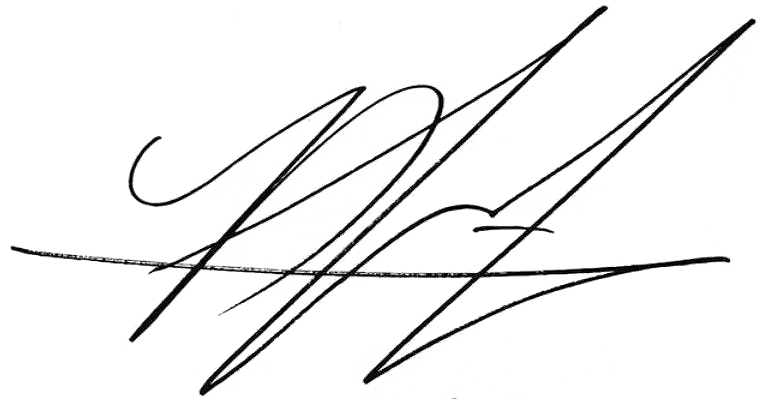

Lee Dae-hwi (Korean: 이대휘, born January 29, 2001), known mononymously as Daehwi, is a South Korean singer-songwriter, producer and television personality. He is a member of South Korean boy group AB6IX, and is known for his participation in the reality competition show Produce 101 Season 2, where he finished in third place overall and became a member of the boy group Wanna One. In addition to singing and writing songs for various artists, he guest hosted and then became the permanent host for the long-time running variety show M Countdown.

== Early life and education ==
Lee Dae-hwi was born in Seoul, South Korea. His father died when he was six years old due to liver cirrhosis. He had lived in Osaka, Japan, for two years and Los Angeles, United States, for six years. He started his path as an idol after he passed the JYP Entertainment's Global Audition in the United States to begin his trainee life in South Korea in 2015. Around late 2016 he got accepted in Brand New Music through audition. In 2019, he graduated from School of Performing Arts Seoul as a Department of Stage Arts major. He currently attends Global Cyber University as a Broadcasting and Entertainment major.

== Career ==
=== Pre-debut: Produce 101 ===
In 2017, Lee participated in Produce 101 Season 2, a reality competition show broadcast on Mnet which produces a boy band from a field of 101 contestants. Lee became the first center performer for the program's promotional theme song, "Pick Me". He participated on the program along with Brand New Music representative trainees Park Woo-jin, Im Young-min and Kim Dong-hyun. In the finale, he finished in third place with 1,102,005 votes, securing him a spot as a member of the boy band which was named Wanna One.

=== 2017–2018: Wanna One, guest hosting ===
Wanna One debuted at the Wanna One Premier Show-Con on August 7, 2017, at the Gocheok Sky Dome with the mini-album 1×1=1 (To Be One). He went on to represent the group in several appearances on variety shows such as Saturday Night Live Korea, Wednesday Food Talk, Amazing Saturday, Produce 48, Visiting Tutor and King of Masked Singer.

He also continued to promote with Wanna One, including as a part of Wanna One's unit The Heal, as a duo with fellow member Ong Seong-wu. He participated as a lyricist of the unit's song, "Sandglass", which is produced by Heize. The group disbanded in January 2019.

In 2018, Lee was involved in several prominent solo activities as an emcee. He was part of Global MC Crew on M Countdown, a music program on Mnet. He has also participated as a special emcee on music programs such as Inkigayo, M Countdown in Thailand, and the music festival KCON 2017–2018 during its stops in Los Angeles, Australia, Japan, New York, and Thailand.

Lee has also composed and produced songs for the Produce 101 shows. During the first evaluation of the Produce 101 Season 2 program, he performed his own composed song, titled "Hollywood". After his debut in Wanna One, Lee had been actively released his own songs under his label, Brand New Music. His first released song under the label was "Good Day" which was included in MXM's first digital single.

In 2018, Lee participated in the Mnet competition program Produce 48 as one of producer for the Concept songs, which was titled "See You Again". His other composed songs for his labelmates includes "Remember Me" by Kang Min-hee, "Wish You Love Me" and "Dawn", which was included on the MXM's first album More Than Ever. The group formally disbanded on December 2018 following the end of their contract with Swing Entertainment.

=== 2019–2025: Solo single and AB6IX debut ===
In January 2019, Lee collaborated with fellow labelmate Park Woo-jin and released a single titled "Candle". The song reached number 60 on the Gaon Single Chart. Lee also joined Brand New Music's boy band AB6IX, which debuted in May.

Lee wrote the song "Slow" for Yoon Ji-sung's debut album Aside, the song "Young 20" for Park Ji-hoon, and the song "Airplane" from Iz*One's second mini album Heart*Iz.

In April 2019, he and Han Hyun-min became official permanent co-hosts on M Countdown. His final broadcast as MC for the show was in February 2021.

Lee is set to make his acting debut as the male lead Dong Jin-woo in SBS's mobile platform Mobidic short drama called Mon Chouchou Global House. The drama will begin filming in August and premiere in October.

On December 16, 2020 it was confirmed that Lee would be producing songs for Mnet's audition show CAP-TEEN.

Daehwi participated in the music competition show Listen Up, competing against producers from across the K-pop industry. In the finale, on October 8, 2022 it was announced he had finished the show in 1st place.

=== 2026–Present: Wanna One Reunion ===
In 2026 Daehwi reunited with 8 of his former Wanna One members on Wanna One Go: Back to Base which aired on Mnet Plus from the end of April until early June. In August, he attended KCON LA MC-ing with Zerobaseone's Sung Han-bin and performing on stage with Wanna One.

== Other ventures ==
=== Endorsement ===
In April 2019, Lee was selected for his first solo endorsement deal as a campaign model of Coca-Cola Korea beverage brand, Fanta pineapple flavor.

== Discography ==
=== Songs ===
Title	Year	Peak charts position	Album
Title	Year	KOR Gaon	Album
As lead artist
"Rose, Scent, Kiss"	2020	— (Note: "Rose, Scent, Kiss" did not enter Gaon Digital Chart, but debuted and peaked at number 105 on Gaon Download Chart.)	5nally
"In Your Eyes"	2022	— (Note: "In You Eyes" did not enter Gaon Digital Chart, but debuted and peaked at number 129 on Gaon Download Chart.)	Complete with You
As featured artist
"Never" (Note: Credited as Nation's Sons with Kim Jong-hyeon, Hwang Min-hyun, Ong Seong-wu, Kim Jae-hwan, Park Woo-jin, and Lai Kuan-lin.)	2017	2	35 Boys 5 Concepts
"Sandglass" (모래시계) (Note: Credited as Wanna One unit - The Heal with Ong Seong-wu.)	2018	9	1÷x=1 (Undivided)
"It's Ok Not To Be Ok" (애써) (As One featuring Lee Dae-hwi)	2019	194	Non-album single
Promotional
"Playlist" (with various artist (Note: Kim Dong-hyun (AB6IX), Hong Seong-jun (BDC), Yun Jung-hwan (BDC), Lee Eun-sang, Kanto, Gree))	2021	—	Non-album single
Collaboration
"Candle" (with Park Woo-jin)	2019	60	Non-album single
Soundtrack appearances
"I'm Crazy" (with Jeon Woong (AB6IX))	2022	—	Crazy Love OST
"—" denotes releases that did not chart or were not released in that region.

=== As producer / songwriter ===
All credits are adapted from Korea Music Copyright Association unless stated otherwise.

Year	Song	Artist(s)	Album	Lyrics	Music	Arrangement
2017	"Good Day"	MXM	Unmix	Yes	Yes	Yes
2018	"Sandglass" (모래시계)	Wanna One	1÷x=1 (Undivided)	Yes	No	No
2018	"Hoping That You'd Love Me" (사랑해줬으면 해)	MXM	More Than Ever	Yes	Yes	No
2018	"Dawn"	MXM	More Than Ever	Yes	Yes	No
2018	"See You Again" (다시 만나)	Produce 48 Trainees	30 Girls 6 Concepts	Yes	Yes	Yes
2018	"기억해줘요" (Remember Me)	Kang Min-hee	Non-album single	Yes	Yes	No
2019	"Candle"	Lee Dae-hwi, Park Woo-jin	Non-album single	Yes	Yes	No
2019	"Slow" (쉼표)	Yoon Ji-sung	Aside	Yes	Yes	No
2019	"Young 20"	Park Ji-hoon	O'Clock	Yes	Yes	No
2019	"Airplane"	Iz*One	Heart*Iz	Yes	Yes	No
2019	"Absolute"	AB6IX	B:Complete	Yes	No	No
2019	"Breathe"	AB6IX	B:Complete	Yes	Yes	No
2019	"Friend Zone"	AB6IX	B:Complete	Yes	Yes	No
2019	"Light Me Up"	AB6IX	B:Complete	Yes	Yes	No
2019	"Dance For Two"	AB6IX	B:Complete	Yes	Yes	No
2019	"Hollywood"	AB6IX	B:Complete	Yes	Yes	Yes
2019	"Dream For You" (꿈을 꾼다)	Produce X 101 Trainees	Produce X 101 - Final	Yes	Yes	No
2019	"Blind For Love"	AB6IX	6ixense	Yes	Yes	No
2019	"Dandelion" (민들레꽃)	AB6IX	6ixense	Yes	Yes	No
2019	"Sunset"	AB6IX	6ixense	Yes	Yes	No
2019	"Love Air"	AB6IX	6ixense	Yes	Yes	No
2019	"Nothing Without You"	AB6IX	6ixense	Yes	Yes	No
2019	"Melting"	AB6IX, BDC, Kang Min-hee, Kanto, Yo Da-young	Brandnew Year 2019 'Do That Brandnew Thing'	Yes	Yes	No
2019	"It's Ok Not To Be Ok" (애써)	As One feat. Lee Dae-hwi	Non-album single	Yes	Yes	No
2020	"Rose, Scent, Kiss"	Lee Dae-hwi	5nally	Yes	Yes	No
2020	"Color Eye"	Park Woo-jin	5nally	Yes	Yes	No
2020	"Red Up"	AB6IX	Vivid	Yes	Yes	No
2020	"Vivid"	AB6IX	Vivid	Yes	Yes	No
2020	"Salute"	AB6IX	Salute	Yes	Yes	No
2020	"Bloom"	AB6IX	Salute	Yes	Yes	No
2021	"Apricity"	AB6IX	Salute: A New Hope	Yes	Yes	No
2021	"Blind For Love (Nu Disco Mix)"	AB6IX	Salute: A New Hope	Yes	Yes	No
2021	"Encore" (앵콜)	AB6IX feat. Abnew	Salute: A New Hope	Yes	Yes	No
2021	"#Hashtag"	Jo Ah-young	Cap-Teen Top 7	Yes	Yes	No
2021	"21"	Lee Dae-hwi	Non-album single	Yes	Yes	No
2021	"Lululala"	AB6IX	Mo' Complete : Have A Dream	Yes	Yes	No
2021	"Merry-Go-Round"	AB6IX	Mo' Complete : Have A Dream	Yes	Yes	No
2021	"A Long Winter"	AB6IX	Mo' Complete : Have A Dream	Yes	Yes	No
2021	"One Day"	Produce 101 Japan (season 2) Trainees	Final	Yes	Yes	No
2021	"Creep"	Lee Dae-hwi	Non-album single	Yes	Yes	No

== Filmography ==
=== Television series ===
Year	Title	Role	Ref.
2019	Mon Chouchou Global House	Dong Jin-woo	
2022	Love Is for Suckers	Kim Sang-woo	

=== Television shows ===
Year	Title	Role	Notes	Ref.
2017	Produce 101 (season 2)	Contestant	Finished in third place	
2018	Visiting Tutor	Tutor	Episodes 8–9	
2018	King of Mask Singer	Contestant (Joker)	Episodes 175–176	
2019	Not the Same Person You Used to Know	Protagonist	Season 2 Episode 3	
2019	Super Hearer	Hearer	Episode 5	
2020	Top 10 Student	Panel	Episode 1	
2021	We're Family	Cast Member		
2022	Listen-Up	Regular member		

=== Hosting ===
Year	Title	Role	Notes	Ref.
2019	M Countdown	Co-host	Episodes 613–697, Official co-host with Han Hyun-min	
2019	New Life for Children	Co-host	with Ha Sung-woon and Kim Hee-ae	
2019	K-World Festa	Special MC	Live Show MC with Ha Sung-woon	
2020	Idol Star Athletics Championships	Special MC	Floor MC, 2020 New Year Special Idol Star Championship	
2020	Mu:Con Online 2020	Co-host	Opening Show MC with Kim Dong-hyun	
2020	IYKoong Studio	Co-host	with Park Shin-young	
2021	Bbangya Music Festival	Host		
2021	K-POP in Suncheon Concert	Co-host	with Hyojung	
2021	Hallyu Olympiad	Co-host	with Sandara Park	
2022–present	Simply K-Pop Contour	Host		
2022	As Each Instinct	Host	with Jo Yu-ri	

=== Web shows ===
Year	Title	Role	Notes	Ref.
2021	HwibujakHwibujak			
2022	X: New World	Cast member	Season 2	
2022–2023	The Door: To Wonderland	Cast member	Season 1–2	
2023	Lee Dae Whistle	MC		

=== Web series ===
Year	Title	Role	Ref.
2023	Strong Underdog	Jung Woo	

=== Radio shows ===
Year	Title	Role	Note(s)	Ref.
2019–2020	Idol Radio	DJ	Episodes 390, 546–547, 550, 552–553, 558	
2021	Young Street	Special DJ	June 14, 2021 – June 20, 2021, July 5, 2021 – July 11, 2021	

=== Music videos ===
Year	Title
2019	"Candle" (Live version) (with Park Woo-jin)
2020	"Rose, Scent, Kiss"
2021	"21"
2021	"Creep"

== Awards and nominations ==
Award	Year	Category	Nominee(s)/work(s)	Result	Ref.
APAN Music Awards	2020	Best All Rounder	Lee Dae-hwi	Nominated	
APAN Music Awards	2020	Entertainer - Man	Lee Dae-hwi	Nominated	
