= Kim Dong-hyun (singer, born 1998) =

South Korean singer and actor (born 1998)

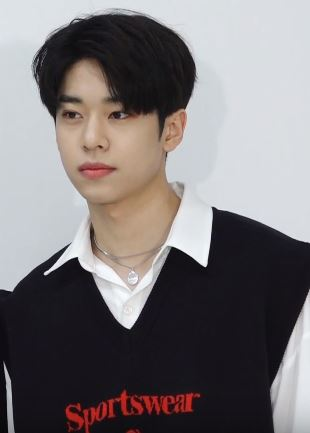
- Kim in April 2019
- Born: September 17, 1998 (age 27); Jung District, Daejeon, South Korea
- Education: Global Cyber University
- Occupations: Singer-songwriter; actor
- Musical career
- Genres: K-pop
- Instrument: Vocals
- Years active: 2017–present
- Label: Brand New Music
- Member of: AB6IX
- Formerly of: MXM

Korean name
- Hangul: 김동현
- Hanja: 金東賢
- RR: Gim Donghyeon
- MR: Kim Tonghyŏn

Kim Dong-hyun (Korean: 김동현, born September 17, 1998), known mononymously as Donghyun, is a South Korean singer-songwriter and actor. He is known for his participation in the reality competition show Produce 101 Season 2. He later debuted as a part of the musical duo, MXM. He is a member of South Korean boy group AB6IX.

== Early life ==
Kim Dong-hyun was born on September 17, 1998, in Daejeon, South Korea. He has an older brother, an older sister, and an older fraternal twin brother, making him the youngest person in his family. Prior to appearing on Produce 101 Season 2, Kim has trained for eleven months. He was a trainee at JYP Entertainment before he passed Brand New Music's audition and joined them as a trainee on late 2016.

Kim was a student at Namdaejeon High School.

== Career ==
=== 2017–2018: Produce 101 and MXM ===
In mid-2017, Kim participated in the Produce 101 Season 2, a reality competition show designed to form a temporary boy group consisting of 11 members chosen by the public from 101 contestants. He represented Brand New Music along with three other trainees. He was eventually eliminated from the show, finishing in 28th place overall on episode 10.

On July 12, 2017, Brand New Music announced that Kim and Lim Young-min, one of his agency mates who also joined Produce 101, would make their debut as a project duo and pre-released a debut single within the same month before releasing an extended play in late August. The project unit name is revealed to be MXM, which was an acronym for "Mix & Match". They released their debut single, Good Day on July 27 which included the title track and "I Just Do", a song that was co-produced by Kim. A few weeks later, on September 6, they released their debut EP, Unmix.

On March 15, 2018, he starred as a male lead in the music video for Lee Kang's song "In Vain (feat. Yang Da-il)". He also appeared as a cameo in Gree's music video for the song "Dangerous".

=== 2019–present: AB6IX and solo activities ===
In early 2019, Brand New Music announced that Kim along with his fellow Produce 101 trainees and an addition of one other trainee would join the lineup for the agency's new boy group named AB6IX. On May 22, the group debuted with their EP, B:Complete which included "Shining Stars", a song that was co-produced by Kim.

In early 2021, Kim starred as one of male lead in a web series called Fling at Convenience Store. He also sang the soundtrack for the series, which was co-produced by him. In April 2021, Kim was confirmed to be part of the cast for the SBS television series Let Me Be Your Knight. He will play the role of Woo Ga-on, the keyboardist and youngest member of LUNA.

== Discography ==
=== Songs ===
List of songs, with selected chart positions, showing year released and album name
Title	Year	Peak chart positions	Album
Title	Year	KOR Down.	Album
As lead artist
"Naturally Curly" (Note: The song is credited under MXM, but solo performed by Kim.) (천연 곱슬)	2018	—	More Than Ever
"Serenade" (세레나데)	2018	—	One More
"More" (더 더)	2020	—	5nally
"Venus"	2022	183	Complete with You
"F_ix You"	2024	—	Find You
As featured artist
"Together Forever" (Adora featuring Kim Dong-hyun)	2022	—	Non-album single
Promotional
"Playlist" (with various artist (Note: Lee Dae-hwi (AB6IX), Hong Seong-jun (BDC), Yun Jung-hwan (BDC), Lee Eun-sang, Kanto, Gree))	2021	—	Non-album single
Soundtrack appearance
"Some" (썸탈래 나랑)	2021	173	Fling at Convenience Store OST
"—" denotes releases that did not chart or were not released in that region.

=== Songwriting ===
All song credits are adapted from the Korea Music Copyright Association's database, unless otherwise noted.

Year	Song	Artist(s)	Album	Lyrics		Music	
Year	Song	Artist(s)	Album	Credited	With	Credited	With
2017	"I Just Do"	MXM	Unmix	Yes	Lim Young-min, Kiggen	Yes	Kiggen
2018	"Checkmate"	MXM	More Than Ever	Yes	Lim Young-min, O'neal, ESBEE, Last.P, Rhymer	No	—N/a
2018	"Without U"	MXM	More Than Ever	Yes	Lim Young-min, 9999, LishBeats	No	—N/a
2018	"Naturally Curly" (천연 곱슬)	MXM	More Than Ever	Yes	—	Yes	—
2018	"Gone Cold" (식어버린 온도)	MXM	More Than Ever	Yes	Primeboi	No	—N/a
2018	"You Look So Different" (다르게 보여)	MXM	One More	Yes	9999, ESBEE, Last.P, O'neal	Yes	9999, ESBEE, Last.P, O'neal
2018	"Serenade" (세레나데)	MXM	One More	Yes	—	Yes	—
2019	"Shining Stars" (별자리)	AB6IX	B:Complete	Yes	Lim Young-min, Park Woo-jin, OUOW	Yes	OUOW
2019	"_And Me"	AB6IX	6ixense	Yes	Lim Young-min, Park Woo-jin, OUOW	Yes	OUOW
2019	"Pretty" (이쁨이 지나치면 죄야 죄)	AB6IX	6ixense	Yes	Lim Young-min, Park Woo-jin, OUOW	Yes	OUOW
2019	"Deep Inside"	AB6IX	6ixense	Yes	Lim Young-min, Park Woo-jin, OUOW	Yes	OUOW
2020	"More" (더 더)	Kim Dong-hyun	5nally	Yes	OUOW	Yes	OUOW
2020	"Maybe" (이게 그리움이 아니라면 대체 뭐겠어)	AB6IX	Salute	Yes	Park Woo-jin	Yes	OUOW
2021	"Some" (썸탈래 나랑)	Kim Dong-hyun	Fling at Convenience Store OST	Yes	OUOW	Yes	OUOW
2021	"3""	AB6IX	Mo' Complete	Yes	OUOW	Yes	OUOW
2022	"Venus"	Kim Dong-hyun	Complete With You	Yes	—	Yes	On the road
2022	"We Could Love"	AB6IX	A to B	Yes	On the road	Yes	On the road, Kim Seung-jun

== Filmography ==
=== Television series ===
Year	Title	Role	Notes	Ref.
2021–2022	Let Me Be Your Knight	Woo Ga-on	Main role	

=== Web series ===
Year	Title	Role	Notes	Ref.
2021	Fling at Convenience Store	Kim Dong-hyun	Main role	

=== Television shows ===
Year	Title	Role	Notes	Ref.
2017	Produce 101 Season 2	Contestant	Finished at 28th place	

=== Radio shows ===
Year	Title	Role	Notes	Ref.
2022–present	Listen	DJ	July 17, 2022–present; with Jeon Woong	

=== Music video ===
Year	Title	Performer(s)	Director(s)	Ref.
2020	"More"	Kim Dong-hyun	Desert Beagle	
