= The Future is Ours =

The Future is Ours may refer to:

- The Future Is Ours, a 2023–2024 series of albums by South Korean band AB6IX
- The Future is Ours, a planned 2027 Netflix sci-fi TV series (adapted from The World Jones Made by Phillip K. Dick)
