= Vivid =

Vivid may refer to:

== Music ==
- Vivid (band), a Japanese rock band
- "Vivid" (song), by Electronic, 1999
- "ViViD", a 2016 song by Loona from HeeJin

=== Albums ===
- Vivid (Vivian Green album), 2015
- Vivid (Crystal Kay album), 2012
- Vivid (Living Colour album), 1988
- Vivid (Ailee album), 2015
- Vivid (KM-MARKIT album), 2005
- Vivid: Kissing You, Sparkling, Joyful Smile, a 2008 mini-album by BoA
- Vivid (EP), 2020 EP by AB6IX

== Organizations ==
- Vivid Entertainment, a company that produces and distributes adult media
- Vivid Image, a defunct UK video game developer
- Vivid Imaginations, a UK toy company
- Vivid Seats, a ticket exchange company

== Technology ==
- HTC Vivid, a mobile phone
- Vivid Vervet, the code name for version 15.04 of the Ubuntu Linux distribution

== Festivals and arts ==
- Vivid (arts centre), a media art centre in Birmingham, England
- Vivid Sydney, an outdoor festival in Sydney, Australia
- Vivid Live, a contemporary music festival held by Sydney Opera House in Australia

== Other uses ==
- Vivid, a brand of bleach produced by Reckitt Benckiser
- Vivid, a fictional all-female group in Hatsune Miku: Colorful Stage! that make up one half of Vivid BAD SQUAD
- Magical Girl Lyrical Nanoha ViVid, a 2009 manga in the Magical Girl Lyrical Nanoha series
- HMS Vivid
