= B Complete =

EP by AB6IX
- Released: May 22, 2019
- Recorded: 2019
- Studio: Brandnew Music Studio
- Genre: K-pop
- Languages: Korean; English
- Labels: Brand New; Warner Music Korea
- Producers: AB6IX; Boombastic; OUOW; Nomad; Elapse; John Napoleon; LishBeats

AB6IX chronology
B Complete (2019)	6ixense (2019)

Singles from B Complete
- 1. "Hollywood" Released: April 25, 2019; 2. "Breathe" Released: May 22, 2019

Music video
- "Breathe" on YouTube

B Complete (stylized as B:COMPLETE) is the debut extended play by the South Korean boy band AB6IX. The album was released digitally and physically on May 22, 2019, by Brand New Music.

== Background and release ==
After the announcement of the group being formed, they released a music video for "Hollywood" performing as a full five member group.

On April 30, 2019 it was revealed that AB6IX would debut with extended play titled B Complete with the title track "Breathe".

The music video, together with the EP, was released on May 22.

== Promotion ==
"Hollywood" was performed by only four of the members during Mnet's survival show Produce 101 (season 2), for their judges grade evaluation. Also "Hollywood" together with "Shining Stars" were performed before release date at Dream Concert and Kcon Japan.

AB6IX had their debut showcase on May 22 at Olympic Hall in Songpa-gu, Seoul where they performed title track "Breathe" along with "Shining Star", "Absolute" and "Hollywood".

The group started promoting their title track "Breathe" on May 23. They first performed the lead single on Mnet's M Countdown, followed by performances on KBS' Music Bank, MBC's Show! Music Core and SBS' Inkigayo.

== Track listing ==
Credits adapted from Melon

No.	Title	Lyrics	Music	Arrangement	Length
1.	"Absolute" (完全體)	LishBeats, OUOW, Lim Young-min, Park Woo-jin, Lee Dae-hwi	LishBeats, OUOW	LishBeats, OUOW	3:27
2.	"Shining Stars" (별자리)	Kim Dong-hyun, Lim Young-min, Park Woo-jin, OUOW	Kim Dong-hyun, OUOW	OUOW	3:48
3.	"Breathe"	Lee Dae-hwi, Lim Young-min, Park Woo-jin, Rhymer	Lee Dae-hwi, Nomad, Rhymer	Nomad, Rhymer	3:38
4.	"Friend Zone"	Lee Dae-hwi	Lee Dae-hwi, Elapse, John Napoleon, Khild, LishBeats	Elapse, John Napoleon, LishBeats	2:57
5.	"Light Me Up"	Lee Dae-hwi, Lim Young-min, Park Woo-jin	Lee Dae-hwi, BOOMBASTIC	BOOMBASTIC	3:14
6.	"Dance for Two" (둘만의 춤)	Lee Dae-hwi, Lim Young-min, Park Woo-jin	Lee Dae-hwi, OUOW	OUOW	3:24
7.	"Hollywood"	Lee Dae-hwi, Lim Young-min, Park Woo-jin	Lee Dae-hwi, LishBeats	Lee Dae-hwi, LishBeats	3:07
Total length:					22:15

== Charts ==
=== Weekly charts ===
Chart (2020)	Peak position
South Korean Albums (Gaon)	2
Japanese Albums (Oricon)	10

=== Monthly charts ===
Chart (2020)	Peak position
South Korean Albums (Gaon)	5

=== Year-end charts ===
Chart (2019)	Position
South Korean Albums (Gaon)	32

== Sales ==
Sales figures for B Complete
Region	Sales
South Korea (Gaon)	171,578
Japan (Oricon)	6,741

== Awards ==
=== Music programs ===
Program	Song	Date	Ref.
The Show (SBS MTV)	"Breathe"	June 4	
Show Champion (MBC)	"Breathe"	June 5	

== Release history ==
Region	Date	Format	Distributor	Ref.
Various	May 22, 2019	Digital download, streaming	Brand New Music	
South Korea	May 22, 2019	CD	Brand New Music	
