= 6ixense =

- Digital cover

Studio album by AB6IX
- Released: October 7, 2019
- Studio: Brandnew Music Studio
- Genre: K-pop
- Length: 38:17
- Languages: Korean; English
- Label: Brand New
- Producers: AB6IX; Boombastic; OUOW; nomad; Kim Taewan; Xepy; SFRM; sanz`o`wave

AB6IX chronology
B Complete (2019)	6ixense (2019)	5nally (2020)

Singles from 6ixense
- 1. "Blind for Love" Released: October 7, 2019

6ixense (pronounced "sixth sense") is the debut studio album by South Korean boy band AB6IX. It was released through Brand New Music on October 7, 2019, along with lead single "Blind for Love" and its music video. The album debuted at number two on the Gaon Album Chart and 25 on the Oricon Albums Chart. It is the final release with member Youngmin, before he left the group on June 8, 2020.

== Promotion ==
Throughout late September and early October, various concept photos for the album and music video teasers were released through the band's social media.

AB6IX had the album showcase on October 7 at Kyung Hee University in Seoul where they performed title track "Blind For Love" along with "Be There" and "Deep Inside".

The group started promoting their title track "Blind For Love" on October 10. They first performed the lead single on Mnet's M Countdown, followed by performances on KBS' Music Bank, MBC's Show! Music Core and SBS' Inkigayo.

== Critical reception ==
Billboard's Jeff Benjamin called the single "Blind for Love" a second part to "Breathe" from B Complete, noting its "sleek house-inspired sound". He pointed out the variety of genres on the album, describing the songs "_And Me" and "Be There" as "a blend of gentle pop and steely hip-hop", "Love Air" as featuring "tropical house vibes", "Pretty" as "staccato-piano pop", "Shadow" as having a "late-night EDM" sound and "Deep Inside" as containing "deep harmonies", while noting "D.R.E.A.M" is a "straightforward hip-hop cut" and closing track "Nothing Without You" a ballad.

== Track listing ==
Credits adapted from Melon

No.	Title	Lyrics	Music	Arrangement	Length
1.	"Be There" (기대)	Lim Young-min, Park Woo-jin, Taewan, Boombastic, Rhymer	Boombastic, Taewan	Boombastic, Taewan	3:22
2.	"Blind for Love"	Lee Dae-hwi, Lim Young-min, Park Woo-jin	Lee Dae-hwi, Xepy, SFRM, sanz`o`wave, nomad, Rhymer	SFRM, sanz`o`wave, nomad	3:36
3.	"Dandelion" (민들레꽃)	Lee Dae-hwi, Lim Young-min, Park Woo-jin	Lee Dae-hwi, Boombastic	Boombastic	3:08
4.	"Sunset"	Lee Dae-hwi, Lim Young-min, Park Woo-jin	Lee Dae-hwi, Boombastic	Boombastic	3:21
5.	"_And Me"	Kim Dong-hyun, Lim Young-min, Park Woo-jin, OUOW	Kim Dong-hyun, OUOW	OUOW	3:14
6.	"Love Air"	Lee Dae-hwi, Lim Young-min, Park Woo-jin	Lee Dae-hwi, nomad	nomad	3:32
7.	"Pretty" (이쁨이 지나치면 죄야 죄)	Kim Dong-hyun, Lim Young-min, Park Woo-jin, OUOW	Kim Dong-hyun, OUOW	OUOW	3:31
8.	"Shadow"	Lim Young-min, Park Woo-jin	Lim Young-min, nomad	nomad	3:12
9.	"Deep Inside"	Kim Dong-hyun, Lim Young-min, Park Woo-jin	Kim Dong-hyun, OUOW	OUOW	4:18
10.	"D.R.E.A.M."	Park Woo-jin, Lim Young-min, FR:EDEN	Lish, FR:EDEN	Lish	3:24
11.	"Nothing Without You"	Lee Dae-hwi	Lee Dae-hwi, Boombastic	Boombastic	3:39
Total length:					38:17

== Charts ==
=== Weekly charts ===
Chart (2020)	Peak position
South Korean Albums (Gaon)	2
Japanese Albums (Oricon)	25

=== Monthly charts ===
Chart (2020)	Peak position
South Korean Albums (Gaon)	10

=== Year-end charts ===
Chart (2019)	Position
South Korean Albums (Gaon)	41

== Sales ==
Sales figures for 6ixense
Region	Sales
South Korea (Gaon)	143,229
Japan (Oricon)	5,064

== Awards ==
=== Music programs ===
Program	Song	Date	Ref.
The Show (SBS MTV)	"Blind For Love"	October 15	
The Show (SBS MTV)	"Blind For Love"	October 22	
Show Champion (MBC)	"Blind For Love"	October 16	
M Countdown (Mnet)	"Blind For Love"	October 17	

== Release history ==
Region	Date	Format	Distributor	Ref.
Various	October 7, 2019	Digital download, streaming	Brand New Music	
South Korea	October 7, 2019	CD	Brand New Music	
