= Vivid (EP) =

EP by AB6IX
- Released: June 29, 2020
- Recorded: 2020
- Studio: Brandnew Music Studio
- Genre: K-pop
- Languages: Korean; English
- Label: Brand New
- Producers: Lee Dae-hwi; OUOW; AYNA; Boombastic; Nomad; ZIco; Brightenlight; No2zcat

AB6IX chronology
5nally (2020)	Vivid (2020)	Salute (2020)

Singles from Vivid
- 1. "The Answer" Released: June 29, 2020

Music video
- "The Answer" on YouTube

Vivid (stylized as VIVID) is the second extended play (EP) by the South Korean boy band AB6IX. The album was released digitally and physically on June 29, 2020, by Brand New Music. Vivid contains six tracks with "The Answer" serving as its lead single. It marks the group's first comeback as a four member-group.

The EP was originally set to be released on June 8, 2020, but was delayed to June 29, 2020, due to member Youngmin's departure from the group on June 8, 2020. Youngmin's departure resulted in the group having to re-record the songs on the EP without Youngmin's voice.

== Commercial performance ==
Vivid reached 93,000 physical album sales within a week and has broken the group's previous first week of release sales record on the 5th day of the release.

== Track listing ==
Credits adapted from Melon

No.	Title	Lyrics	Music	Arrangement	Length
1.	"Red Up"	Lee Dae-hwi; Park Woo-jin	Lee Dae-hwi; Nomad	Nomad	3:39
2.	"Vivid"	Lee Dae-hwi; OUOW; Park Woo-jin	Lee Dae-hwi; OUOW; Nomad; On The Road; Rhymer	Nomad; On The Road	3:24
3.	"답을 줘 (The Answer)"	Zico	Zico; Brightenlight; No2zcat	Zico; Brightenlight; No2zcat	3:11
4.	"초현실 (Surreal)"	OUOW; AYNA; Park Woo-jin	OUOW; AYNA	OUOW	3:14
5.	"Midnight Blue"	OUOW; AYNA; Park Woo-jin	OUOW; AYNA	OUOW	3:08
6.	"끈 (Hold Tight)"	OUOW; Boombastic	Boombastic; OUOW	Boombastic; OUOW	3:22
Total length:					19:18

== Charts ==
=== Weekly charts ===
Chart (2020)	Peak position
South Korean Albums (Gaon)	3
Japanese Albums (Oricon)	12

=== Monthly charts ===
Chart (2020)	Peak position
South Korean Albums (Gaon)	9

== Sales ==
Sales figures for Vivid
Region	Sales
South Korea (Gaon)	140,184
Japan (Oricon)	5,058

== Awards ==
=== Music programs ===
Program	Song	Date	Ref.
The Show (SBS MTV)	"The Answer"	July 7	

== Release history ==
Region	Date	Format	Label	Ref.
Various	June 29, 2020	Digital download, streaming	Brand New Music	
South Korea	June 29, 2020	CD	Brand New Music	
