= MXM (musical duo) =

2017–2018 South Korean musical duo

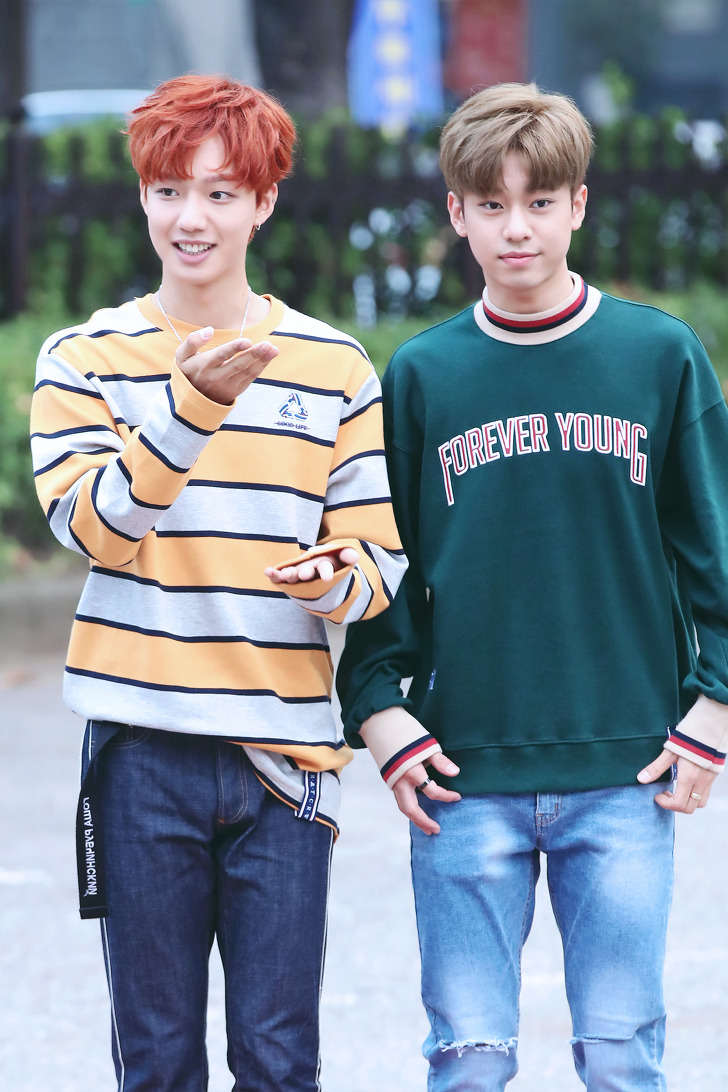

Background information
- Origin: Seoul, South Korea
- Genres: K-pop; hip hop; R&B; tropical house
- Years active: 2017–2018
- Label: Brand New
- Members: Lim Young-min; Kim Dong-hyun
- Website: brandnewmusic.co.kr

MXM was a South Korean duo under Brand New Music that consisted of members Lim Young-min and Kim Dong-hyun.

== History ==
=== Pre-debut ===
Lim Young-min and Kim Dong-hyun met as trainees under Brand New Music. They represented the agency alongside Lee Dae-hwi and Park Woo-jin in Produce 101 Season 2. When the show ended, neither of the two earned a spot in the project unit Wanna One: Young-min finished 15th overall, while Dong-hyun was eliminated prior to finale, placing 28th.

On July 12, it was announced that Young-min and Dong-hyun would debut as a project unit, with both having signed exclusive contracts with Brand New Music before Produce 101 and becoming members of Brand New Boys. The name MXM reportedly stands for both "Mix and Match" and "More x More". The former refers to the duo's compatibility as a group despite contrasting qualities, while the latter refers to their determination to develop as a duo. (Note: Excerpt: 임영민과 김동현의 유닛명 'MXM (BRANDNEW BOYS)'은 'MIX & MATCH'의 약자이자, 'MORE X MORE'의 약자로 임영민, 김동현 두 멤버의 매력을 합쳐 새로운 매력으로 선보이겠다는 의미와 함께 계속해서 더 성장해 나가겠다는 의미를 담았으며, 유닛명만으로도 이번 데뷔에 대한 남다른 각오와 열정이 느껴져 큰 기대감을 심어준다.) On July 27, they released a two-track promotional single titled "Good Day". Dong-hyun wrote the lyrics of the single's second track "I Just Do" with Young-min, as well as arranging and producing it with Brand New Music producer, Kiggen.

=== 2017: Debut ===
MXM officially debuted on September 6 with the release of their EP entitled Unmix. The EP contains seven tracks, including "Good Day" and "I Just Do". (Note: Excerpt: 앨범명은 '언믹스'(UNMIX)로, 이 중 2곡이 27일 선공개됐다. 전체 앨범은 이르면 8월 말, 늦으면 9월 초에 발매할 예정이다.) The lead single, "I'm the One," was written and produced by Brand New Music producers 9999 and Esbee.

On September 22, the duo participated in Brand New Music's annual concert titled "Brand New World Seoul", held at the Seoul Jangchung Arena.

=== 2018–present: Match Up, Rematch, More Than Ever, One More ===
MXM released their second EP titled Match Up on January 10, 2018, with total of six tracks including the lead single "Diamond Girl".

In 2018, MXM announced their release of a double single titled Rematch on March 6, 2018, accompanied with a music video for the track "Gone Cold", produced by Primeboi. They worked on their second Rematch single titled "Love Me Now" with 9999 and Esbee. Also in March 2018, they announced a Makestar photobook project, which opened for participation on March 9.

MXM released their first full-length album titled More Than Ever on August 14, 2018, with the lead single "Ya Ya Ya". Following the release of the album, MXM announced would hold their first concert titled More Than Ever on September 29 and 30 at Olympic Hall.

On November 7, the duo released special single One More with double lead single, "Knock Knock (TAK Remix)" and "You Look So Different".

Lim Young-min and Kim Dong-hyun joined Brand New Music's new boy group AB6IX in 2019.

== Members ==
- Lim Young-min (임영민) - Rapper
- Kim Dong-hyun (김동현) - Vocalist

== Discography ==
=== Studio albums ===
Title	Details	Peak chart positions	Sales
Title	Details	KOR	Sales
More Than Ever	Released: August 14, 2018; Label: Brand New Music; Format: CD, digital download, streaming; Track listing: 1. Knock Knock; 2. Checkmate; 3. Show Me Your Love; 4. Ya Ya Ya; 5. Hoping That You'd Love Me; 6. Don't Stop Me Now; 7. Come Close; 8. Without You; 9. Another Level; 10. Dawn; 11. Naturally Curly (Donghyun Solo); 12. Can't Take My Eyes Off feat. Kanto (Youngmin Solo); 13. Gone Cold; 14. Love Me Now	5	KOR: 36,994

=== Extended plays ===
Title	Details	Peak chart positions		Sales
Title	Details	KOR	JPN	Sales
Unmix (언믹스)	Released: September 6, 2017; Label: Brand New Music; Format: CD, digital download, streaming; Track listing: 1. "Good Day"; 2. "I'm the One"; 3. "Being Objective" (객관적인 시선); 4. "Just Come Out" (일단 나와); 5. "Save the Rest" (오늘은 여기까지); 6. "I Just Do"; 7. "I'm the One" (Inst.) (CD only)	3	129	KOR: 59,526; JPN: 781
Match Up	Released: January 10, 2018; Label: Brand New Music; Formats: CD, digital download, streaming; Track listing: 1. "Diamond Girl" (다이아몬드걸); 2. "Errday"; 3. "Perfectly Perfect" (완벽하게 완벽해); 4. "Rush On You" (딱 기다려줘); 5. "Lips"; 6. "Diamond Girl" (Inst.) (CD only)	3	—	KOR: 46,982

=== Singles ===
Title	Year	Peak chart positions		Sales	Album
Title	Year	KOR	KOR Hot	Sales	Album
"Good Day" (Note: "Good Day" was released digitally as pre-debut single.)	2017	60	—	KOR: 30,981	Unmix
"I'm the One"	2017	55	—	KOR: 25,501	Unmix
"Diamond Girl"	2018	—	—	—N/a	Match Up
"Gone Cold" (Note: "Gone Cold" and "Love Me Now" were released as the double A-side from the group's double single titled "Rematch".)	2018	—	—	—N/a	Rematch
"Love Me Now"	2018	—	—	—N/a	Rematch
"Ya Ya Ya"	2018	—	—	—N/a	More Than Ever
"Checkmate"	2018	—	—	—N/a	More Than Ever
"Knock Knock (TAK Remix)"	2018	—	—	—N/a	One More
"You Look So Different"	2018	—	—	—N/a	One More
"—" denotes releases that did not chart or were not released in that region.

=== As featured artist ===
Title	Year	Album
"LOVE IT LIVE IT"	2018	YDPP PROJECT`LOVE IT LIVE IT`

=== Collaborations ===
Title	Year	Album
"Baby Can I" (너가 필요한 것 같아) (with Bumkey, Chancellor, Sanchez, Taewan, and Yang Da-il)	2017	Brandnew Year 2017 'Brandnew Season'
"Sweater" (스웨터) (with Bumkey, Taewan, Kang Min-hee, Yang Da-il, and Vincent Blue)	2018	Brandnew Year 2018 'Brandnew 7'
"So Special" (스웨터) (with Boombastic)	2019	Non-album single

=== Other charted songs ===
Title	Year	Peak chart positions		Sales	Album
Title	Year	KOR	KOR Hot	Sales	Album
"I Just Do"	2017	99	—	KOR: 20,088	Unmix
"—" denotes releases that did not chart or were not released in that region.

=== Music videos ===
Year	Title	Album	Director
2017	"I'm the One"	Unmix	Digipedi
2018	"Diamond Girl" (다이아몬드걸)	Match Up	Digipedi
2018	"LOVE IT LIVE IT"	YDPP PROJECT 'LOVE IT LIVE IT'	Han Sa Min (Dextor-Lab)
2018	"Gone Cold" (식어버린 온도)	Rematch	Vikings League
2018	"YA YA YA"	MORE THAN EVER	Wooje Kim (ETUI Collective)
2018	"CHECKMATE"	MORE THAN EVER	Vikings League

== Concert and tours ==
Headlining tours

- More Than Ever (2018)

== Awards and nominations ==
=== Gaon Chart Music Awards ===
Year	Nominee / work	Award	Result
2018	UNMIX	New Artist of the Year (Album)	Nominated

=== Golden Disc Awards ===
Year	Nominee / work	Award	Result
2018	MXM	New Artist of the Year	Nominated
2018	MXM	Global Popularity Award	Nominated

=== Melon Music Awards ===
Year	Nominee / work	Award	Result
2017	MXM	Best New Artist	Nominated

=== Seoul Music Awards ===
Year	Nominee / work	Award	Result
2018	MXM	New Artist Award	Nominated
2018	MXM	Popularity Award	Nominated
2018	MXM	Hallyu Special Award	Nominated
