= Produce 101 season 2 =

Boy group survival reality show

Produce 101
- Season 2
- Promotional poster
- No. of episodes: 11 (see list)

Release
- Original network: Mnet
- Original release: April 7 – June 16, 2017

Season chronology
- ← Previous; Season 1

Produce 101 Season 2 (Korean: 프로듀스 101 시즌 2) is a 2017 boy group survival reality show on Mnet, and is the second season of the original South Korean version of the franchise. The public (called 'national producers') "produces" a boy group by choosing 11 members among 101 trainees from 54 entertainment companies through online voting and live voting with multiple elimination rounds. The public also chose the group's concept, debut song and group name. In the season finale on June 16, 2017, which was broadcast live, the show announced the final 11 members who would debut as Wanna One. More than 16 million people cast their votes during the finale, equivalent to around 30% of South Korea's population.

== Concept ==
Produce 101 Season 2 consisted of 101 male contestants, who were trainees under company labels, debuted idols, or individual trainees in South Korea. Though most contestants were Korean, there were some Chinese, Japanese, and Taiwanese participants in addition to those from other nations. In the final episode, 11 out of the top 20 contestants were chosen to form the show's "project group" through a national fan voting system. The group will promote for two years (ending December 31, 2018) under YMC Entertainment (also the label of I.O.I from Produce 101 Season 1). The top 35 performed with the winning team at a finale concert. The group will disband after their contracts end, allowing the members of the final lineup to return to their respective agencies.

Bigger agencies, including S.M., YG, and JYP chose not to send trainees to participate in the second season. YG Entertainment was, however, represented by four models under their subsidiary YGKPlus. The first season's main director Han Dong-chul also withdrew from the show due to other commitments.

For the boys' training, several artists were recruited for the show. Singers Lee Seok-hoon and Shin Yoo-mi were in charge of vocal training. Rappers Cheetah and Don Mills oversaw rap training. Kahi and Kwon Jae-seung oversaw dance training.

== Pre-show and promotions ==
On February 23, Mnet announced that BoA would be taking the MC role for this season, replacing Jang Keun-suk. She would be "acting as a messenger and a representative of the viewers". Later on the same day, the trainers were also announced. Mnet announced the official broadcast of the show, which would replace High School Rapper's time slot, on March 8.

AKATV, a production company founded in 2015 by some of the former production staff of the first three seasons of Mnet's Show Me the Money, was given the production duties for the season, replacing Signal Entertainment Group from Season 1.

Soon after they had moved to their dorms on February 26, the participants started filming. A teaser video of who would be taking "center" (or lead role) for the first song was later revealed.

The contestants of Produce 101 Season 2 appeared for the first time on Episode 514 of M! Countdown on March 9, 2017. The group was presented by BoA, and the members performed the EDM theme song "나야나 (Pick Me)". The "center" role was given to Brand New Music's Lee Dae-hwi. Some participants had previously debuted through NU'EST, JJCC, HOTSHOT and Topp Dogg. Other participants also gained attention from National Producers such as ONO Entertainment's Jang Moon-bok, Maroo Entertainment's Park Ji-hoon, Fantagio's Ong Seongwoo and the youngest participant from Media Line Entertainment's Lee Woojin.

On March 31, the participants performed their single "나야나 (Pick Me)" at the Gocheok Sky Dome ahead of a baseball game between the LG Twins and the Nexen Heroes. In addition, Lee Dae-hwi threw the ceremonial first pitch to Brave Entertainment's Kim Samuel, at bat.

== Contestants ==
Color key (In order of contestant's rank on the show)

Final members of Wanna One
Contestants eliminated in the final episode
Contestants eliminated in the third elimination round
Contestants eliminated in the second elimination round
Contestants eliminated in the first elimination round
Contestants that left the show

101 contestants
Kang Daniel (강다니엘)	Park Ji-hoon (박지훈)	Lee Dae-hwi (이대휘)	Kim Jae-hwan (김재환)	Ong Seong-wu (옹성우)
Park Woo-jin (박우진)	Lai Guanlin (라이관린)	Yoon Ji-sung (윤지성)	Hwang Min-hyun (황민현)	Bae Jin-young (배진영)
Ha Sung-woon (하성운)	Jeong Se-woon (정세운)	Kang Dong-ho (강동호)	Kim Jong-hyeon (김종현)	Lim Young-min (임영민)
Ahn Hyeong-seop (안형섭)	Yoo Seon-ho (유선호)	Kim Samuel (김사무엘)	Ju Hak-nyeon (주학년)	Choi Min-ki (최민기)
Jin Longguo (김용국)	Kwon Hyun-bin (권현빈)	Lee Eui-woong (이의웅)	Kenta Takada (타카다 켄타)	Roh Tae-hyun (노태현)
Kim Sang-gyun (김상균)	Jang Moon-bok (장문복)	Kim Dong-hyun (김동현)	Kim Dong-han (김동한)	Kim Tae-dong (김태동)
Seo Sung-hyuk (서성혁)	Kim Ye-hyun (김예현)	Lee Keon-hee (이건희)	Lee Woo-jin (이우진)	Park Woo-dam (박우담)
Jung Dong-soo (정동수)	Park Seong-woo (박성우)	Hong Eun-ki (홍은기)	Yoo Hwe-seung (유회승)	Woo Jin-young (우진영)
Joo Jin-woo (주진우)	Yeo Hwan-woong (여환웅)	Justin (저스틴)	Lee Gwang-hyun (이광현)	Byun Hyun-min (변현민)
Yoon Hee-seok (윤희석)	Kim Seong-ri (김성리)	Kim Sang-bin (김상빈)	Kim Tae-woo (김태우)	Lee Jun-woo (이준우)
Zhu Zhengting (정정)	Kim Nam-hyung (김남형)	Lee Ki-won (이기원)	Lee You-jin (이유진)	Yoon Jae-chan (윤재찬)
Kim Yong-jin (김용진)	Lee In-soo (이인수)	Kim Dong-bin (김동빈)	Kim Tae-min (김태민)	Ha Min-ho (하민호)
Sung Hyun-woo (성현우)	Ju Won-tak (주원탁)	Choi Dong-ha (최동하)	Jung Joong-ji (정중지)	Kwon Hyub (권협)
Lim Woo-hyuk (임우혁)	Jung Hyo-jun (정효준)	Son Dong-myeong (손동명)	Lee Seo-kyu (이서규)	Kim Hyun-woo (김현우)
Choi Tae-woong (최태웅)	Jo Jin-hyung (조진형)	Yoon Yong-bin (윤용빈)	Han Min-ho (한민호)	Yoo Jin-won (유진원)
Kim Yeon-guk (김연국)	Jung Shi-hyun (정시현)	Kim Chan-yul (김찬율)	Choi Seung-hyuk (최승혁)	Lee Hoo-lim (이후림)
Kim Jae-han (김재한)	Kim Chan (김찬)	Jang Dae-hyeon (장대현)	Yoo Kyung-mok (유경목)	Choi Ha-don (최하돈)
Park Hee-seok (박희석)	Yoo Ho-yeon (유호연)	Jo Gyu-min (조규민)	Wang Min-hyuk (왕민혁)	Choi Jun-young (최준영)
Jo Sung-wook (조성욱)	Kim Do-hyun (김도현)	Jo Yong-geun (조용근)	Lee Gun-min (이건민)	Jung Won-cheol (정원철)
Choi Hee-soo (최희수)	Choi Jae-woo (최재우)	Lee Ji-han (이지한)	Han Jong-yeon (한종연)	Kim Shi-hyun (김시현)
Nam Yoon-sung (남윤성)				

== Episodes ==
=== Episode 1 (April 7, 2017) ===
The trainees from each company enter the studio, where seats are arranged in a pyramid with chairs numbered from 1 to 101. Each contestant chooses his preferred seat. Then contestants perform in a group or individually according to their company for evaluation. Some participants are asked to showcase any dancing, singing, or rapping skills for individual evaluation. Each trainee is judged on his potential and judges grade and assigned them into temporary groups for training: A, B, C, D, and F (with A being the highest and F the lowest). At the end of the episode, the popularity vote revealed Maroo Entertainment's Park Ji-hoon at 1st place who became popular after a gif of his wink at the end of the "나야나 (Pick Me)" performance went viral.

=== Episode 2 (April 14, 2017) ===
After a few more evaluations, the trainees are assigned to dorms by their evaluation grades, and BoA announces that they will be performing on M! Countdown with their single "나야나 (Pick Me)"; they introduce the lyrics and choreography, and are told that they have three days to memorize the choreography and lyrics for a video evaluation. Line distribution and stage placement are determined by their final letter grade; A will have the most lines while F will be backup dancers who stand on the floor by the stage. The trainees film themselves individually performing the song while their fellow grade members watch. Each video is evaluated by the mentors. After the re-evaluation, they are given their new grades and are asked to move to their new rooms by rank. Four F ranked trainees moved up from their grade: Jellyfish Entertainment's Yoon Hee-seok, HF Music Company's Jung Won-chol and Pan Entertainment's Lee Ji-han are moved to B rank while The Vibe Label's Kim Tae-dong moves to the A rank.

=== Episode 3 (April 21, 2017) ===
After the announcement of the new batch of A ranked trainees, A rankers are given an hour to prepare a stage to appeal to the other trainees. The trainees, including those in the A group, have to vote for who they believe would be the best for the center position. Brand New Music's Lee Dae-hwi of group A is voted to be the center with Lee Woojin received the second most votes. After their live performance, BoA announced the departure of 3 trainees from the show and that the 37 contestants who would receive the lowest ranks would be eliminated in the first elimination.

The trainees started their second mission: group performances in front of a live audience. 16 teams are formed to compete for 8 songs given: Super Junior's "Sorry Sorry", Shinee's "Replay", 2PM's "10 out of 10", B2ST's "Shock", Infinite's "Be Mine", EXO's "Call Me Baby", BTS's "Boy in Luv", and SEVENTEEN's "Mansae". Being the center, Lee Dae-hwi chooses his team first. Following the finalized picks for his team, by random draw, Lee Dae-hwi picks Hwang Min-hyun to choose his team. The remaining 14 team founders are also chosen by random draw. Each group consists of 5-7 members. The team founders then compete for songs individually through a race: only 8 can secure their desired songs and choose their opponent from the remaining 8 teams who lose in the race. The episode later showed the groups rehearsing and assigning roles of the 'leader', 'center', 'main vocalist', 'sub vocalists', and 'rappers'. Each song is then performed live by the two groups and each member is voted on separately by the live audience. The winning team among the two is determined by combining the individual scores. Members of the winning group would gain an extra 3000 points each, to be included into the ranking announcement of the week after. The group with the highest overall points would later perform on M! Countdown. Only four teams covering "10 Out of 10" and "Call Me Baby" were covered this week.

=== Episode 4 (April 28, 2017) ===
The remaining 12 teams performed their respective songs and rehearsals for the groups are shown. After the last performance, the contestants are shown their ranking based purely on individual live votes and the additional 3000 points for the contestants of the winning teams: Park Woo-dam takes the 1st place. His "Mansae" group (composed of Park Woo-dam, Ju Won-tak, Kim Yeon-kuk, Woo Jin-young, and Kim Tae-dong), also score the highest, and are able to perform a special stage on M! Countdown.

=== Episode 5 (May 5, 2017) ===
For this episode, contestants from Produce 101 Kim So-hye, Choi Yoo-jung and Kim So-hee appear as special panelists. The episode opens with the remaining 98 contestants entering the main studio by company. In between announcements of each trainee's ranking, events leading up to the elimination are shown, such as their dorm life, exercise and a hidden camera prank. I.O.I's Kim Do-yeon and Choi Yoo-jung met with the trainees and hosted a dance battle among the trainees, in which Hong Eun-ki was crowned "Dancing King". A poll for 'Top Visual' was also conducted, in which Park Ji-hoon was ranked 1st. Park Ji-hoon also retained his first place in the rankings announcement. First center Lee Dae-hwi was ranked 7th, the shocking fall in his rank surprising everyone. After announcing the top 59 trainees, BoA announces that the last trainee to be saved from elimination is Kim Sang-bin, ranking 60th. At the end of the episode, BoA announces that the team formation for the 4th mission, which is position evaluation, will be decided by online voting. This is a major difference to that of Season 1, where trainees got to choose the song they want.

=== Episode 6 (May 12, 2017) ===
BoA once again meets with the trainees to announce the next challenge. The trainees are tasked to perform live in groups based on positions they want to debut in: vocal, dance or rap. There are five songs for vocals (I.O.I's "Downpour", BTS's "Spring Day", BoA's "Amazing Kiss", Blackpink's "Playing With Fire", and Jung Seung Hwan's "If It Is You") four songs for dance (Jason Derulo's "Get Ugly", NSYNC's "Pop", Ed Sheeran's "Shape of You", and Flo Rida's "Right Round") and four songs for rap (Mino ft. Taeyang's "Fear", iKON's "Rhythm Ta", Zico's "Boys and Girls", and Simon Dominic, G2, BewhY, and One's "Who You"). Each song has a member limit and would be picked by each trainee based on their ranks: Park Ji-hoon who ranked 1st (center) from the first elimination round would have the privilege of choosing the song he wants to perform first. BoA also announces that only 35 trainees will remain in the next round and that the winner from each position category will receive 100,000 votes while the winner from each group will receive 10,000 votes. After each performance, they are ranked in their groups first and then overall in the category. On the day of the stage performances, Super Junior's Leeteuk substituted BoA to host the show due to the latter's prior commitment. Only six groups are covered this week, with "Shape of You" group (composed of Roh Tae-hyun, Park Sung-woo, Kim Tae-dong, Justin, Kim Dong-han, and Lee Jun-woo) receiving the show's first-ever encore call.

=== Episode 7 (May 19, 2017) ===
The remaining seven teams perform their respective stages and rehearsals for the groups are shown. After the last performance, the contestants are shown their overall ranking based on their positions. The additional 10,000 points are given to 12 contestants for receiving the highest points on their respective group and the extra 100,000 points to Lee Gun-hee, Roh Tae-hyun, and Kim Jong-hyeon for receiving the highest points in vocal, dance, and rap position respectively.

=== Episode 8 (May 26, 2017) ===
The episode opens with BoA treating the contestants to pizza before she temporarily goes overseas during the Position Evaluation filming. Sometime after the performances and before the ranking announcement on May 12, BoA gathers the boys informing them about the coming elimination round (where contestants ranking 36 onwards would get eliminated). She then introduces the next challenge: Concept Evaluation. She introduces the five songs: Hyuk Shin's "I Know You Know" (Synth-pop/Funk), Veethoven, Oh Sunghwan, Kiggen and ASSBRASS's "Oh Little Girl" (Hip Hop), ASHTRAY & KINGMAKER's "Show Time" (Nu-disco), Devine-Channel's "Open Up" (열어줘) (Future EDM), and Triple H's "Never" (Deep house). Group formations are based on the viewers' poll which was first introduced at the end of Episode 5. The top 12 trainees voted for each song are assigned to the songs first. Due to voting manipulation controversies, however, Kang Daniel, Lee Ki-won, and Kim Dong-bin are banned from their alleged preferred songs. After they are given their designated songs, the formed groups started to rehearse.

The second elimination round takes place during the second half of the episode with the remaining 58 contestants from each company are seen entering the main studio by company. Names of the top 35 trainees are called by BoA one by one starting from rank 34. In between the second elimination round, a mini contest of who punches the strongest is conducted. Kang Dong-ho is given the title "Punching King". Kim Jong-hyeon receives the 1st place in the ranking announcement while Kim Dong-han ranks 35th, just escaping elimination.

=== Episode 9 (June 2, 2017) ===
BoA announces that since there is an uneven distribution of members after the last elimination, groups with more than 7 people need to vote on who stays. The remaining groups, which have less than 7 people after the elimination, pick from the members who were voted out. All the composers for the concept evaluation songs visit the trainees and they perform in front of the composers. This episode shows the live performances for all five concept evaluations. "Open Up" (열어줘) group (composed of Kang Daniel, Kang Dong-ho, Kim Yong-guk, Joo Hak-nyeon, Yoo Seon-ho, Kenta Takada, and Lim Young-min) received an encore call and afterwards was also declared the winner of the concept evaluation, resulting in at least 20,000 benefit votes for each member, with the person from that group with the most votes, winning 100,000 benefit votes, to be revealed in the next elimination (Kang Dong-ho and Kang Daniel are the two candidates for 1st place). In addition, the group will also perform on M! Countdown.

=== Episode 10 (June 9, 2017) ===
The episode opens with the remaining 35 contestants from each company entering the main studio. Amidst the eliminations, the trainees participate in a question relay and a team game event where "Open Up" (열어줘) group emerges as the winner. They are also asked to vote for the top 6 pick for the debut team in the trainees among them, with MMO Entertainment's Yoon Ji-sung taking 1st place and Kang Daniel, Jung Se-woon, Park Ji-hoon, Ong Seong-woo, and Park Woo-jin taking 2nd to 6th place respectively. At the elimination, BoA reveals that only 20 trainees will advance to the final stage. Kang Daniel is announced as the overall winner of the concept evaluation, winning 100,000 benefit votes. With ranks 19 to 3 revealed, Kang Daniel and Park Ji-hoon are called up as the contenders for 1st place, with Kang Daniel revealed to be 1st in the overall rank as well. The contenders for 20th place are then called up, Choon Entertainment's Kim Yong-guk and Cube Entertainment's Lai Guan-lin, with Lai Guan-lin, whose massive rank drop surprised everyone, surviving the elimination.

With the top 20 confirmed, BoA announces the next and final mission – the debut song evaluation. She introduces "Hands on Me" (produced by The Underdogs and Deez) and "Super Hot" (produced by Ryan Jhun) as the final line-up's debut songs. She explains that they will be split into two teams of 10, each team composed of one main vocal, six to seven sub vocals, and two to three rappers. The trainees choose their positions beginning with rank 20 up to 1, with the higher ranked trainees being given the advantage of replacing the lower ranked trainees and bumping them into another position. Due to voting manipulation controversies, 17th place Lim Young-min had to choose his position first as a penalty. After positions are confirmed, the trainees begin practicing the choreography and memorizing the lyrics in preparation for the final stage.

=== Episode 11 (June 16, 2017) ===
The episode begins showing the boy's audition tapes, as well as their final confessional interviews. An announcement is then made that viewers will now be able to send SMS votes for one trainee only, which will be added to the online votes in order to determine the final line-up. The debut evaluation starts off with the eliminated trainees joining the top 20 trainees for a performance of "It's Me (Pick Me)". BoA then reveals that the debut group will be named Wanna One (워너원).

The episode cuts to the boys performing in two groups. "Super Hot" group (composed of Ha Sung-woon, Kim Samuel, Kang Dong-ho, Yoo Seon-ho, Ahn Hyung-seob, Lee Dae-hwi, Choi Min-ki, Lim Young-min, Kim Jong-hyeon, and Lai Guan-lin) performs first with Ha Sung-woon as the center of the group, followed by "Hands on Me" group (composed of Kim Jae-hwan, Kang Daniel, Ong Seong-woo, Bae Jin-young, Hwang Min-hyun, Jung Se-woon, Joo Hak-nyeon, Yoon Ji-sung, Park Woo-jin, and Park Ji-hoon) with Bae Jin-young as the center of the group. After the performances, a segment is shown during which trainees watch videos left by their families, some of which surprise the trainees by visiting them in person. The top 20 trainees also perform together a special song titled "Always" (이 자리에) as a commemoration of their time throughout the competition.

Voting comes to a close, and ranking announcements begin. Bae Jin-young, Hwang Min-hyun, Yoon Ji-sung, Lai Guan-lin, Park Woo-jin, Ong Seong-woo, Kim Jae-hwan, and Lee Dae-hwi are announced as 10th to 3rd place, respectively, confirming them for debut. The top 2 trainees are revealed to be Kang Daniel and Park Ji-hoon once again. Kang Daniel once again receives the most votes, confirming his position as the center for Wanna One, with Park Ji-hoon in 2nd place. Finally, 11th place Ha Sung-woon is announced as the final member.

== Discography ==
=== Singles ===
Title	Year	Peak positions		Sales	Album
Title	Year	KOR	KOR Hot.	Sales	Album
"It's Me (Pick Me)" (나야 나)	2017	26	40	KOR: 781,339+	Non-album single
"Show Time" (It's)	2017	25	89	KOR: 173,564+	35 Boys 5 Concepts
"I Know You Know" (Boys Under the Moonlight)	2017	21	91	KOR: 179,536+	35 Boys 5 Concepts
"Open Up" (열어줘) (Knock)	2017	10	52	KOR: 294,147+	35 Boys 5 Concepts
"Oh Little Girl" (Slate)	2017	7	40	KOR: 362,793+	35 Boys 5 Concepts
"Never" (Nation's Son)	2017	2	18	KOR: 874,890+	35 Boys 5 Concepts
"Hands on Me"	2017	11	44	KOR: 201,738+	Produce 101 – Final
"Super Hot"	2017	19	63	KOR: 162,786+	Produce 101 – Final
"Always" (이 자리에)	2017	17	66	KOR: 175,951+	Produce 101 – Final

== Controversies ==
According to Ilgan Sports, the staff of Produce 101 Season 2 have tried to find a trainee who talked to the media about discrimination of the trainees by grade ranking. Ilgan Sports reported that trainees encountered discrimination, such as level-determined permission to go to the bathroom and eat different meals. Also, there are issues about boys who bullied other students and plagiarism of choreography.

Maroo Entertainment's Han Jong-youn left the show due to a serious bullying and sexual assault scandal. An alleged former classmate accused Han Jong-youn of making him masturbate in front of his friends, forcing him to fight with his friends, and locking him in the cleaning equipment room.

YGKPLUS's Kwon Hyun-bin deleted all of his Instagram posts after they were flooded with negative comments. This was in response to the show's fourth episode, in which Kwon was seen as unmotivated and received harsh criticism from the trainers for a lack of practice, but despite this his team won the live performance battle and he received the highest score out of both teams. During the performance, the trainers commented that the group was "ready to debut". After the performance, Kwon Hyun-bin stated that "I'm here because I really want to debut as a singer" and "I've put everything on the line for this". Despite having received the most votes, netizens criticized Kwon Hyun-bin for his "lack of sincerity".

The Vibe Label's Ha Min-ho allegedly tried to engage in sexual relationships with minors. Screenshots of Instagram and Facebook conversations between him and minor fans were posted online, and he was also accused of sexually harassing and bullying an ex-girlfriend in middle school. After discussion with Mnet, he left the show and canceled his contract with his label.

=== Voting manipulation ===
In the concept song round of the show, four contestants were accused of cheating by trying to manipulate a vote to determine which song they would perform. MMO Entertainment's Kang Daniel reportedly indicated which song he preferred by altering the number of cat emojis in his Instagram biography at the request of a fanpost on a community site. Mnet decided to penalize the trainees that failed to follow the rules by banning them from choosing the songs in question.

2Y Entertainment's Lee Ki-won was accused of hinting at his song preference by posting "Oh Ki Won> Sa Ki Won Sam Ki Won Lee Ki Won" on Instagram. His agency released a statement saying that Lee would be banned from using social media until the show was over. A subsequent statement said that the posts in question were made by the agency in an attempt to increase Lee's popularity while he was allegedly sleeping and unaware.

Kiwi Media Group's Kim Dong-bin was also involved, through screenshots of KakaoTalk messages in which Kim's father asked his fanclub's president to promote "Never" or "Open Up" as the concept song for Kim Dong-bin.

Brand New Music's Lim Young-min was later implicated through screenshots of a KakaoTalk chatroom of fans, which revealed that Lim's brother had asked his friend to inform the fans in the chatroom that Lim wanted the songs "Never" and "Oh Little Girl" for his concept song. As this incident was not caught until after the recording of concept evaluation, Lim was penalized with a different penalty during the following evaluation.

== Ranking ==
The top 11 contestants were determined by online and onsite voting, the results of which were announced at the end of each episode. The top 11 contestants at the final vote determined the final group. For the first and second voting periods, viewers were allowed to select 11 trainees per vote. During the third round, the system changed to 2 trainees per vote. For the final round, the system changed to one trainee per vote. Unlike the previous season, only those with South Korean mobile phone numbers were allowed to vote under a CJ One or TMON account to prevent voting fraud.

Color key

New Top 11

#	Episode 1	Episode 2	Episode 3	Episode 5	Episode 6	Episode 8	Episode 10	Episode 11
1	Park Ji-hoon	Park Ji-hoon	Park Ji-hoon	Park Ji-hoon	Kim Jong-hyeon (▲7)	Kim Jong-hyeon	Kang Daniel (▲7)	Kang Daniel
2	Jang Moon-bok	Kim Samuel (▲4)	Lee Dae-hwi (▲1)	Kim Samuel (▲1)	Kang Daniel (▲3)	Lai Kuan-lin (▲3)	Park Ji-hoon (▲1)	Park Ji-hoon
3	Lee Dae-hwi	Lee Dae-hwi	Kim Samuel (▼1)	Yoon Ji-sung (▲6)	Park Ji-hoon(▼2)	Park Ji-hoon	Ha Sung-woon (▲22)	Lee Dae-hwi (▲7)
4	Joo Hak-nyeon	Ong Seong-wu (▲4)	Ong Seong-wu	Ong Seong-wu	Hwang Min-hyun (▲7)	Lee Dae-hwi (▲6)	Bae Jin-young (▲8)	Kim Jae-hwan (▲9)
5	Bae Jin-young	Jang Moon-bok (▼3)	Ahn Hyung-seob (▲2)	Kang Daniel (▲7)	Lai Kuan-lin (▲4)	Lim Young-min (▲7)	Kim Samuel (▲11)	Ong Seong-wu (▲3)
6	Kim Samuel	Lai Kuan-lin (▲4)	Joo Hak-nyeon (▲2)	Ahn Hyung-seob (▼1)	Ong Seong-wu (▼2)	Hwang Min-hyun (▼2)	Park Woo-jin (▲8)	Park Woo-jin
7	Ahn Hyung-seob	Ahn Hyung-seob	Lai Kuan-lin (▼1)	Lee Dae-hwi (▼5)	Kim Jae-hwan (▲9)	Ong Seong-wu (▼1)	Kim Jong-hyeon (▼6)	Lai Kuan-lin (▲13)
8	Ong Seong-wu	Joo Hak-nyeon (▼4)	Jang Moon-bok (▼3)	Kim Jong-hyeon (▲5)	Kang Dong-ho (▲12)	Kang Daniel (▼6)	Ong Seong-wu (▼1)	Yoon Ji-sung (▲1)
9	Lee Eui-woong	Hwang Min-hyun (▲2)	Yoon Ji-sung (▲10)	Lai Kuan-lin (▼2)	Joo Hak-nyeon (▲1)	Kim Jae-hwan (▼2)	Yoon Ji-sung (▲6)	Hwang Min-hyun (▲2)
10	Lai Kuan-lin	Lee Eui-woong (▼1)	Bae Jin-young (▲2)	Joo Hak-nyeon (▼4)	Lee Dae-hwi (▼3)	Joo Hak-nyeon (▼1)	Lee Dae-hwi (▼6)	Bae Jin-young (▼6)
11	Hwang Min-hyun	Kim Jong-hyeon (▲4)	Jeong Se-woon (▲6)	Hwang Min-hyun (▲5)	Yoo Seon-ho (▲6)	Kang Dong-ho (▼3)	Hwang Min-hyun (▼5)	Ha Sung-woon (▼8)

=== First voting period ===
#	Episode 1 (Online votes)	Episode 2 (Online votes)	Episode 3 (Online votes)	Episode 4 (Live votes)		Episode 5 (Total votes)	
#	Episode 1 (Online votes)	Episode 2 (Online votes)	Episode 3 (Online votes)	Name	Votes	Name	Votes
1	Park Ji-hoon	Park Ji-hoon	Park Ji-hoon	Park Woo-dam	3,270	Park Ji-hoon	1,044,197
2	Jang Moon-bok	Kim Samuel	Lee Dae-hwi	Kim Tae-dong	3,180	Kim Samuel	863,861
3	Lee Dae-hwi	Lee Dae-hwi	Kim Samuel	Ahn Hyung-seob	3,163	Yoon Ji-sung	844,829
4	Joo Hak-nyeon	Ong Seong-wu	Ong Seong-wu	Choi Min-ki	3,157	Ong Seong-wu	819,186
5	Bae Jin-young	Jang Moon-bok	Ahn Hyung-seob	Kwon Hyun-bin	3,142	Kang Daniel	817,245
6	Kim Samuel	Lai Kuan-lin	Joo Hak-nyeon	Kenta Takada	3,133	Ahn Hyung-seob	810,639
7	Ahn Hyung-seob	Ahn Hyung-seob	Lai Kuan-lin	Jang Moon-bok	3,123	Lee Dae-hwi	809,484
8	Ong Seong-wu	Joo Hak-nyeon	Jang Moon-bok	Yoon Hee-seok	3,121	Kim Jong-hyeon	752,149
9	Lee Eui-woong	Hwang Min-hyun	Yoon Ji-sung	Park Ji-hoon	3,113	Lai Kuan-lin	717,275
10	Lai Kuan-lin	Lee Eui-woong	Bae Jin-young	Lee Ki-won	3,112	Joo Hak-nyeon	703,391
11	Hwang Min-hyun	Kim Jong-hyeon	Jung Sae-woon	Hwang Min-hyun	3,108	Hwang Min-hyun	680,322

Notes
- On Episode 4, an additional 3000 points are given to the boys of the winning teams.
- The ranking for Episode 5 is the result of combining online votes and live votes from the previous episode.

=== Second voting period ===
#	Episode 6 (Online votes)	Episode 7 (Live votes)		Episode 8 (Total votes)	
#	Episode 6 (Online votes)	Name	Votes	Name	Votes
1	Kim Jong-hyeon	Lee Gun-hee	110,717	Kim Jong-hyeon	2,795,491
2	Kang Daniel	Kim Jong-hyeon	110,665	Lai Kuan-lin	2,202,665
3	Park Ji-hoon	Roh Tae-hyun	110,621	Park Ji-hoon	2,181,840
4	Hwang Min-hyun	Lim Young-min	10,651	Lee Dae-hwi	2,095,314
5	Lai Kuan-lin	Yoo Seon-ho	10,642	Lim Young-min	2,011,798
6	Ong Seong-wu	Kim Yong-guk	10,633	Hwang Min-hyun	2,004,207
7	Kim Jae-hwan	Kim Jae-hwan	10,622	Ong Seong-wu	1,998,849
8	Kang Dong-ho	Jeong Se-woon	10,584	Kang Daniel	1,948,847
9	Joo Hak-nyeon	Joo Hak-nyeon	10,581	Kim Jae-hwan	1,822,842
10	Lee Dae-hwi	Park Woo-jin	10,542	Joo Hak-nyeon	1,629,176
11	Yoo Seon-ho	Jung Jung	10,537	Kang Dong-ho	1,585,712

Notes

- On Episode 7, an additional 10,000 points were given to the winner of each group while 100,000 points were given to the winner of each category (Lee Gun-Hee from RBW in vocal position, Kim Jong-Hyun from PLEDIS in rap position and Roh Tae-hyun from Ardor&Able in dance position).

=== Third voting period ===
#	Episode 9 (Live votes)		Episode 10 (Total votes)	
#	Name	Votes	Name	Votes
1	Kang Daniel	100,205	Kang Daniel	828,148
2	Kang Dong-ho	20,078	Park Ji-hoon	630,198
3	Joo Hak-nyeon	20,071	Ha Sung-woon	413,654
4	Yu Seon-ho	20,059	Bae Jin-young	389,982
5	Kim Yong-guk	20,058	Kim Samuel	378,491
6	Lim Young-min	20,057	Park Woo-jin	372,493
7	Kenta Takada	20,024	Kim Jong-hyeon	367,052
8	Park Ji-hoon	182	Ong Seong-wu	358,656
9	Park Woo-jin	95	Yoon Ji-sung	333,974
10	Hwang Min-hyun	91	Lee Dae-hwi	325,990
11	Bae Jin-young	82	Hwang Min-hyun	315,650

Notes

- On Episode 9, an additional 20,000 points were given to each member of the winning group except for the one with the most votes, who received an additional 100,000 points instead. First and second place were announced in Episode 10.

=== Result ===
During the last episode aired on June 16, 2017, BoA announced the unit boy band's name: Wanna One (워너원).

#	Episode 11 (Total votes)		
#	Name	Votes	Company
1	Kang Daniel	1,578,837	MMO Entertainment
2	Park Ji-hoon	1,136,014	Maroo
3	Lee Dae-hwi	1,102,005	Brand New Music
4	Kim Jae-hwan	1,051,735	Individual Trainee
5	Ong Seong-wu	984,756	Fantagio
6	Park Woo-jin	937,379	Brand New Music
7	Lai Guan-lin	905,875	Cube Entertainment
8	Yoon Ji-sung	902,098	MMO Entertainment
9	Hwang Min-hyun	862,719	Pledis
10	Bae Jin-young	807,749	C9
11	Ha Sung-woon	790,302	Ardor & Able

== Ratings ==
In the table below, the blue numbers represent the lowest ratings and the red numbers represent the highest ratings.

Episode #	Original broadcast date	Average audience share		
Episode #	Original broadcast date	AGB Nielsen		TNmS
Episode #	Original broadcast date	Nationwide	Seoul National Capital Area	Nationwide
1	April 7, 2017	1.638%	1.606%	2.1%
2	April 14, 2017	1.912%	1.972%	2.5%
3	April 21, 2017	2.260%	2.142%	3.2%
4	April 28, 2017	2.321%	2.392%	3.0%
5	May 5, 2017	3.001%	2.746%	3.9%
6	May 12, 2017	3.054%	2.779%	4.4%
7	May 19, 2017	3.096%	3.166%	4.2%
8	May 26, 2017	3.275%	3.361%	4.8%
9	June 2, 2017	2.966%	2.514%	4.5%
10	June 9, 2017	3.927%	4.147%	4.9%
11	June 16, 2017	5.197%	5.088%	6.4%
Average		2.968%	2.901%	4.0%

== International broadcast ==
- In Japan, the first episode of Produce 101 Season 2 aired on Mnet Japan starting on May 25, 2017, followed by 11 episodes every Thursday night at 1:00 AM (Friday dawn).
- In the Asia and Australia region, the first episode of Produce 101 Season 2 aired via tvN Asia on April 25, 2017, followed by 11 episodes every Tuesday at 23:00.

== Aftermath ==
- A finale concert was held by the top 35 contestants on July 1 and 2, 2017 at the Olympic Hall in Seoul.
- Wanna One released three EPs and two albums from 2017 to 2018. They disbanded on January 27, 2019 after a 4-day final concert at Gocheok Sky Dome in Seoul.
  - Several group members resumed activities for their respective agencies:
    - Ha Sung-woon debuted as a solo artist with his first EP, My Moment, on February 28, 2019. He left Star Crew after HOTSHOT disbanded and on December 24, 2021 it was announced that he signed a contract with Big Planet Made, the same company that manages VIVIZ and Soyou.
    - Hwang Min-hyun returned to NU'EST following Wanna One's disbandment and rejoined group promotions for their sixth EP, Happily Ever After, which was released on April 29, 2019.
    - Ong Seong-wu starred as the lead in the JTBC drama At Eighteen, which ran from July to September 2019. He debuted as a soloist on March 25, 2020 with his first EP, Gravity.
    - Park Ji-hoon debuted as a solo singer with his first EP, O'Clock, on March 26, 2019, and was also cast in the same month in the JTBC historical drama Flower Crew: Joseon Marriage Agency, which aired from September to November 2019.
    - Park Woo-jin and Lee Dae-hwi released a single, "Candle," in January 2019. Both Woojin and Daehwi (alongside fellow Brand New trainees Lim Young-min and Kim Dong-hyun) debuted as members of Brand New Music's boy group AB6IX with their debut EP, B Complete, on May 22.
    - Bae Jin-young released his debut single album, Hard to Say Goodbye, on April 26, 2019. He later debuted as a member of C9's boy group CIX with the EP Hello Chapter 1: Hello, Stranger, which was released on July 23.
    - Lai Kuan-lin was cast as the lead of the Chinese drama A Little Thing Called First Love, which ran from October to November 2019. He also was part of a duo, Wooseok x Kuanlin, with Wooseok from Pentagon, and released their first EP, 9801, on March 11, 2019. Kuanlin requested for termination of his contract with Cube Entertainment in July 2019, but his request was dismissed in November 2019.
    - Yoon Ji-sung released his first extended play, Aside, on February 20, 2019 under LM Entertainment. He enlisted in the military on May 14, 2019. He was discharged early on November 20, 2020.
    - Kim Jae-hwan signed with Swing Entertainment, Wanna One's label, and debuted as a solo artist with his first EP, Another, on May 20, 2019.
    - Kang Daniel initially signed with LM Entertainment in January 2019, before submitting an application to suspend his contract with LM, which was granted to him on May 10. He established his own agency, Konnect Entertainment, for his solo activities, and released his first EP, Color on Me, on July 25.
Other contestants
- JBJ was formed by fans of the show. It originally consisted of 7 eliminated trainees, but The Vibe Label's Kim Tae-dong (30th) was not confirmed participation in the group because of an ongoing conflict with his agency. JBJ later debuted with six-members and released their EP Fantasy on October 18, 2017. They actively promoted for seven months under Fave Entertainment and CJ E&M. The group's held their final concert on April 22, 2018, and disbanded on April 30, 2018.
  - Kim Yong-guk (21st) debuted solo with Friday N Night on August 29, 2018.
  - Kwon Hyun-bin (22nd) debuted solo with Dimension under the stage name VINNI on August 19, 2019.
  - Kenta Takada (24th) formed a duo with Kim Sang-gyun, JBJ95.
  - Roh Tae-hyun (25th) debuted solo with Birthday on January 24, 2019.
  - Kim Sang-gyun (26th) formed a duo with Kenta, JBJ95.
  - Kim Dong-han (29th) debuted as a soloist with D-Night in October 2018. On October 5, 2020, he debuted as a member of boy group WEi with their debut EP titled Identity: First Sight.
- Star Road Entertainment's Kenta Takada (24th) had participated to release OST for MBC drama The Guardians, KBS daily drama Lovers in Bloom, MBC daily drama Return of Bok Dan Ji .
- Rainz was formed by 7 eliminated trainees and released their EP Sunshine on October 12, 2017. They actively promoted under KISS Entertainment for over a year. The group disbanded on October 28, 2018.
  - WH Creative's Seo Sung-hyuk (31st) debuted solo with Good Night, My Dear on September 24, 2019 under Think About Entertainment. On March 10, 2022, he debuted as a member of boy group TAN with their debut EP titled 1TAN.
  - GON Entertainment's Hong Eun-ki (38th) debuted solo with Blow on July 19, 2019.
  - K-Tigers' Byun Hyun-min (45th) debuted in co-ed group K-TIGERS ZERO with Huiroaerak on September 19, 2019.
  - C2K Entertainment's Kim Sung-ri (47th) debuted solo with First Love on April 15, 2019.
  - 2Y Entertainment's Lee Ki-won (53rd)
  - 2Able Entertainment's Joo Won-tak (62nd) debuted solo with In The Light on November 25, 2018.
  - Oui Entertainment's Jang Dae-hyeon (83rd) debuted as a soloist with Feel Good on August 24, 2019. On October 5, 2020, he debuted as a member of boy group WEi with their debut EP titled Identity: First Sight.
- Brand New Music's Im Young-min (15th) and Kim Dong-hyun (28th) known as MXM teamed up with Starship Entertainment's Jung Se-woon (12th) and Lee Gwang-hyun (44th) formed special unit, YDPP released digital single "Love It Live It" on April 5, 2018.
- Some trainees debuted/joined with groups:
  - Kang Dong-ho (13th), Kim Jong-hyeon (14th), and Choi Min-ki (20th) returned to NU'EST NU'EST disbanded after the release of their 10th anniversary compilation album, Needle & Bubble. While Kang Dong-ho remained with Pledis Entertainment, Kim Jong-hyun & Choi Min-Ki left the label.
  - Roh Tae-hyun (25th) returned to HOTSHOT.
  - Media Line Entertainment's Lee Woo-jin (34th) returned to The East Light. However, the group disbanded due to abuse allegations.
  - Kim Tae-woo (49th) returned to his band Rion Five. He helped band Chic Angel in the promotion of the song "Good Day".
  - Son Dong-myung (68th) returned to his group MAS, later participating in KBS survival program The Unit with his bandmates. They redebuted as ONEWE on May 13, 2019.
  - Choi Ha-don (85th) and Kim Chan-yul (78th) returned to JJCC.
  - FNC Entertainment's Yoo Hoe-seung (39th) joined N.Flying.
  - Happy Face Entertainment (ex HF Music Company)'s Jeong Won-cheol (95th) joined MY.st.
  - Individual Trainee Kim Chan (82nd), Narda Entertainment's Kim Tae-woo (49th), K-Tigers's Byun Hyun-min (45th), RBW's Choi Jae-woo (97th) made a fan-meeting and released their single "Present", on July 14, 2017.
  - Choon Entertainment's Kim Yong-guk (21st) and Kim Shi-hyun debuted as a unit group called Longguo & Shihyun on July 31, 2017 with release of their EP the.the.the.
  - S.How Entertainment's Jung Dong-soo (36th) and Kim Nam-hyung (52nd) debuted as a duo called AA on August 3, 2017 with release of their single "Flex".
  - Brand New Music's Im Young-min (15th) and Kim Dong-hyun (28th) debuted as a unit group called MXM on September 6, 2017 with release of their EP "Unmix". Both of them, alongside former Wanna One members Park Woo-jin and Lee Dae-hwi, debuted as members of Brand New's boy group AB6IX with their debut EP, B Complete, on May 22., Lim Young Min left the group on June 8, 2020 due to a DUI.
  - Gini Star's Park Hee-seok (86th), Wang Min-hyuk (89th) and Kim Do-hyun (92nd) debuted in a seven-membered group, BAIKAL on September 21, 2017 with the song "Hiccup"
  - Yuehua Entertainment formed special unit for Ahn Hyung-seob (16th) and Lee Eui-woong (23rd) known as Hyeongseop X Euiwoong who released their single album on November 2. On March 2, 2022, they debuted as members of boy group Tempest.
  - Cre.ker Entertainment's Ju Hak-nyeon (19th) debuted in a twelve-membered group, The Boyz on December 6, 2017 with release EP "The First".
  - ONO Entertainment's Jang Moon-vok (27th) and The Vibe Label's Seong Hyun-woo (61st) released single "Don't Be Afraid" on December 8, 2017. Then, they debuted as a member of boy group called Limitless along with Yoon Hee-seok (46th) with the single "Dream Play"
  - I.One Entertainment (later known as Luk Factory) is Kim Yeon-kook (76th), Ryu Ho-yeon (87th), Choi Hee-soo (96th) and Nam Yun-sung debuted in a nine-membered group, NOIR on April 9, 2018.
  - Blessing Entertainment's Im Woo-hyuk (66th) and Yoo Jin-won (75th) debuted as a duo called UNLOCK on November 24, 2017 with a release of their digital single "Slide to UNLOCK".
  - MMO Entertainment's Kim Jae-han (81st) signed with WYNN Entertainment and debuted as a member of SPECTRUM on May 5, 2018 with a release of their EP "Be Born", He Left the Label again And Signed With Spire Entertainment and Debut as a Member of Omega X Alongside Fellow Contestant Kim Tae-dong (30th)
  - RBW's Choi Jae-woo (97th) signed with JFLO Entertainment and debuted as a member of NewKidd02 on July 25, 2018 with single "Shooting Star".
  - Individual Trainees Choi Dong-ha (63rd) and Kim Chan (82nd) joined DS&A Entertainment. Now they are preparing for the debut in the band A-TEEN.
  - Maroo Entertainment's Han Jong-yeon debuted as a member of LUCENTE on September 18, 2018 with a release of their EP "The Big Dipper ".
  - HF Music Company's Woo Jin-young (40th), Park Woo-dam (35th) and Jung Yoojun released their song "You Are Pretty" as trio HNB on December 2, 2018. The three officially debuted in 5-member boy group D1CE on August 1, 2019 with Wake Up: Roll The World.
  - RBW's Lee Keon-hee (33rd), Yeo Hwan-ung (41st) and Lee Gun-min (94th) (after changing his name to Lee Seo Ho) debuted as a members of ONEUS on January 9, 2019 with a release of their EP "LIGHT US".
  - Wings Entertainment's Kim Yong-jin (56th) debuted as a members of AWEEK on January 31, 2019 with single "The More I See".
  - Kim Taedong (30th) and Kim Jae-han (81st) left their respective labels and signed with Spire Entertainment, both debuted as members of Omega X on June 30, 2021.
- Some trainees debuted as soloists:
  - STL Entertainment's Choi Jun-young (90th) released a solo single as Jooen, "101" on June 29, 2017.
  - ONO Entertainment's Jang Moon-bok (27th) released a solo single as JMVOK, "Let's Walk Together" (featuring Hwang A-young), on July 20, 2017.
  - Brave Entertainment's Kim Samuel (18th) released his solo EP Sixteen on August 2, 2017.
  - Starship Entertainment's Jung Se-woon (12th) released his solo EP Part 1. Ever on August 31, 2017. Lee Gwang-hyun (44th) featured in one of the mini-album's songs, "오! 나의 여신 (Oh! My Angel)".
  - Wings Entertainment's Kim Yong-jin (56th) released a solo single, "Alt+F4" on December 21, 2017. Jeong Dong-su (36th) was featured on this song.
  - Individual Trainee Kim Sang-been (48th) joined 12%MUSIC and released a solo single as BIL, "Juicy" on December, 2017.
  - Cube Entertainment's Yoo Seon-ho (17th) released his EP Spring, Seonho on April 11, 2018.
  - Choon Entertainment's Kim Yong-guk (21st) released a solo single, "Clover" on June 13, 2018.
  - S How Entertainment's Jeong Dong-su (36th) released a solo single as ARKAY, "너 때문에ㅠㅠ" on June 18, 2018.
  - OUI Entertainment's Kim Dong-han (29th) release his EP "D-DAY" on June 19, 2018.
  - Finecut Entertainment's Joo Jin-woo (41st) (ex MMO Entertainment) released a solo single, "EVER" on July 19, 2018.
  - 2Able Entertainment's Joo Won-tak (62nd) released a solo single, "IN THE LIGHT" on November 26, 2018.
  - WH Creative's Seo Sung-hyuk (31st) released a solo single Good Night, My Dear on September 24, 2019 under Think About Entertainment.
- Some eliminated trainees left their agencies:
  - Seo Sung-hyuk (31st) left WH Creative and later signed with Think About Entertainment.
  - Kim Ye-hyun (32nd) left WIDMAY Entertainment to focus on his studies.
  - Joo Jin-woo (41st) left MMO Entertainment. He later signed with Finecut Entertainment to pursue his career as an actor.
  - Yoon Hee-seok (46th) left Jellyfish Entertainment. He later signed with ONO Entertainment.
  - Kim Dong-bin (58th) left Kiwi Media Group to focus on his studies but returned to the label on September 4, 2017. He later joined MLD Entertainment and participated in Produce X 101.
  - Seong Hyun-woo (61st) left The Vibe Label and later signed to ONO Entertainment on November 1, 2017.
  - Jung Joong-ji (64th) left WAYZ Company and later signed with Think Technique Laboratory. However on September 9, 2022, he died at the age of 30.
  - Kwon Hyeop (65th) left Maroo Entertainment.
  - Lee Hoo-lim (80th) left YGKPlus and later signed to Daydream Entertainment.
  - Kim Jae-han (81st) left MMO Entertainment. He later signed with WYNN Entertainment and debuted as a member of SPECTRUM.
  - Cho Gyu-min (88th) left IMX.
  - Jeong Won-cheol (95th) left HF Music Company (now Happy Face Entertainment) and later signed with MY Entertainment.
  - Choi Hee-soo (96th) left I.One Entertainment (later known as Luk Factory).
  - Choi Jae-woo (97th) left RBW Entertainment.
- Some trainees debuted as actors:
  - HIM Entertainment's Park Sung-woo (37th) pursue his acting career with starred in a web drama series, The Omniscient Viewpoint on Crushes, as part of the main cast in early July 2017.
  - Hanahreum Company's Kim Tae-min (59th) announced that he would pursue an acting career.
  - Namoo Actors' Lee Yoo-Jin (54th) starred in the JTBC drama Age of Youth 2 after SHINee member Onew left due to his controversy.
  - Cube Entertainment's Yu Seon-ho (17th) and Yuehua Entertainment's Ahn Hyung-seob (16th) started in a web drama, Mischievous Detective, alongside Apink's Namjoo. It will be broadcast on Naver TV in September 2017.
  - Lee Ji-han (98th) signed with 935 Entertainment, and later starred in web drama Today Was Another Nam Hyun Day. 935 Entertainment later confirmed Lee as one of the victims of the Itaewon stampede incident, with filming of his upcoming drama Kkokdu's Gye Jeol temporarily put on hold.
- Some trainees participated in other survival shows:
  - HF Music Company's Woo Jin-young (40th), Banana Entertainment's Yoon Yong-bin (73rd), HF Music Company's Jo Yong-geun (93rd), RBW's Lee Gun-min (94th) and Maroo Entertainment's Han Jong-yeon joined Mix Nine, where only Woo Jin-young make it into debut group. The group's debut was cancelled in May 2018.
  - Woo Jinyoung also joined Show Me The Money 8. He was eliminated in the rapper selection round, but passed the second judging. He was later eliminated in the One Minute Rap Round. He debuted in the boy group D1CE.
  - Yuehua Entertainment's Justin (43rd) and Zhu Zheng-Ting (51st) joined Chinese survival show Idol Producer in 2018 and became a part of the final line-up for the Chinese boy group, Nine Percent. They also debuted in Yuehua's Chinese boy group NEX7.
  - Kiwi Media Group's Kim Dong-Bin (59th) joined Produce X101 after signing with MLD Entertainment. He finished #42 in the show.
  - Yuehua Entertainment's Choi Seung-hyeok (79th) left the label, and announced to participate another Mnet survival show I-LAND (co-produced with Belift Lab) under a new name "Choi Se-on".
  - WH Creative's Seo Sung-hyuk (31st), who had left the company and joined Think About Entertainment, and The Vibe Label's Yoon Jae-chan (55th) joined The Wild Idol. The former managed to secure a spot in the debut group called TAN.

=== Vote manipulation investigation ===
In December 2019, it was revealed that producing director Ahn Joon-young and chief producer Kim Yong-bum had swapped rankings for one trainee who was supposed to debut in Wanna One with another trainee who was not originally in the debut lineup. They also swapped rankings for one trainee who had originally passed the first elimination with a trainee who originally did not make the cutoff. Ahn and Kim were eventually indicted on suspicions of obstruction of business and fraud later that month.

In June 2020, the charges of fraud were dropped by The Seoul Central District Prosecutors' Office, citing lack of evidence.

In November 2020, the Seoul High Court disclosed that Seong Hyun-woo and Kang Dong-ho were the two trainees who were victims of the voting manipulation done by the show's producers. Seong Hyun-woo's ranking was manipulated to prevent him from passing the first elimination while Kang Dong-ho's ranking was manipulated to prevent him from debuting in Wanna One.
