= It's Me (Pick Me) =

Song

Single by Produce 101 Season 2 contestants
- Released: March 9, 2017
- Recorded: 2017
- Genre: K-pop; dance-pop; electropop; EDM
- Length: 4:07
- Label: CJ E&M
- Songwriters: Ryan S. Jhun; Emile Ghantous; Keith Hetrick; Appu Krishnan; Che'Nelle; Jason Jones; Zaydro; RHeaT

"It's Me (Pick Me)" (Korean: 나야 나 (PICK ME); RR: Naya na (PICK ME)) is a song by contestants of Produce 101 Season 2 and serves as the theme song of the show. It was released online as a digital single on March 9, 2017 by CJ E&M, along with a music video starring Lee Dae-hwi as chosen center. On the show's official soundtrack, a piano version of the song was released and was played in the season's final episode. It was confirmed that the main vocals for the track were done by only 19 selected trainees and the other trainees did background vocals. The song was re-released by Wanna One, the winning group of Produce 101 Season 2 on their album 1X1=1 (To Be One).

The song is uptempo electro-pop song and was created by Ryan S. Jhun. It was chosen as one of the most influential and memorable K-pop songs of the year by several industry professionals.

== Charts ==
Chart	Peak position	Sales
Gaon Digital Chart	9	781,339
