= Lanna Commins =

Thai singer (born 1983)

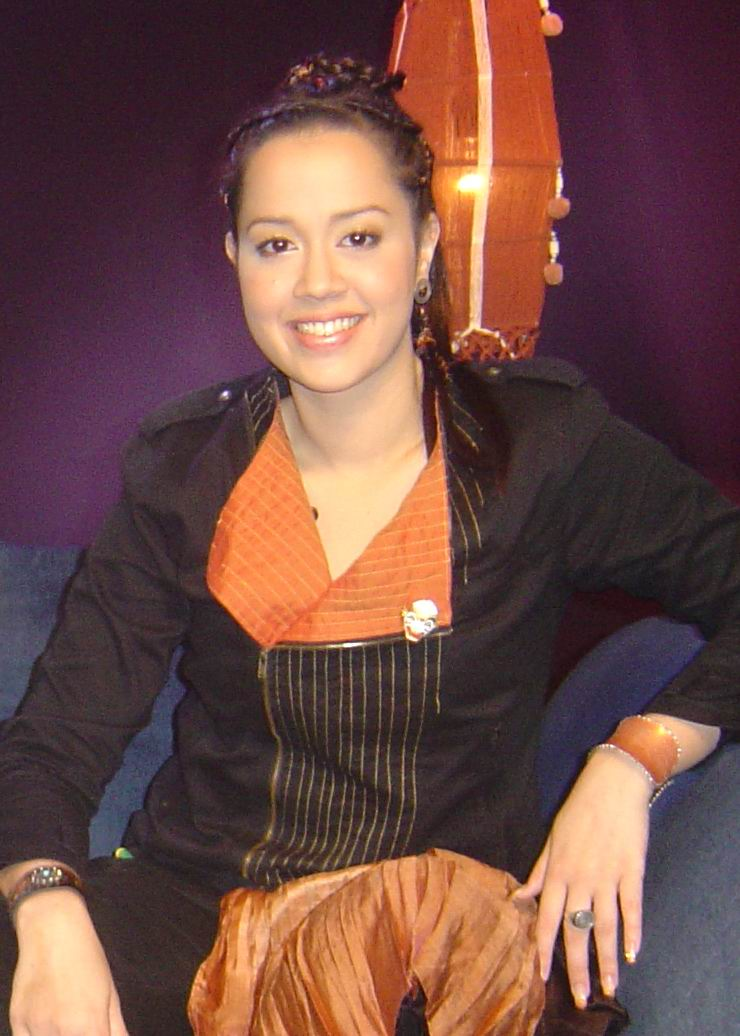

Background information
- Born: November 3, 1983 (age 41); Chiang Mai, Thailand
- Genres: Thai pop fusion
- Occupation: Singer
- Labels: GMM Grammy

Lanna Commins (Thai: ลานนา คัมมินส์; born November 3, 1983) is a Thai singer. Her mother, Soontaree Vechanont, is a notable folk singer; her father is Australian. Commins spent her early years in Malaysia and Australia before finally moving back to Chiang Mai, Thailand. She routinely sang at Huan Soontaree (Thai: เฮือนสุนทรี), her mother's restaurant, where she attracted the interest of GMM Grammy. She has released three albums under the GMM Grammy record label, and two additional songs.

== Discography ==
- 2004 – Lanna Commins
- 2005 – Yin Dee Pee Ra Gaa
- 2006 – Happy Trip
- 2007 – N/A
