= AB6IX =

South Korean boy band

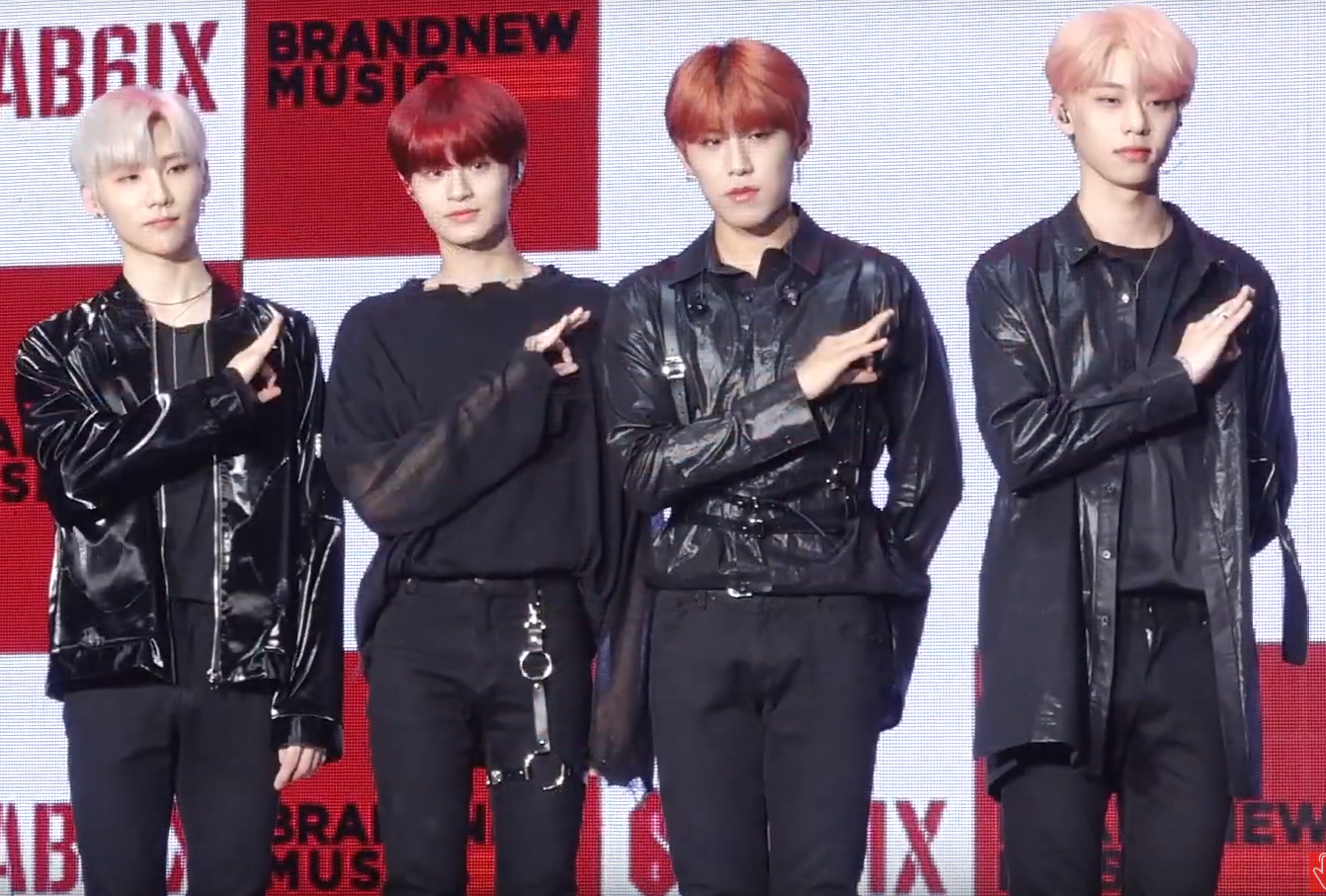
- AB6IX at their first EP showcase in 2019; L–R: Woong, Daehwi, Woojin, and Donghyun

Background information
- Origin: Seoul, South Korea
- Genres: K-pop; deep house; hip hop; R&B; pop rock
- Years active: 2019–present
- Labels: Brand New Music; Victor
- Members: Woong; Donghyun; Woojin; Daehwi
- Past members: Youngmin
- Website: Official website; Japan official website

AB6IX (AY-bee-siks; Korean: 에이비식스; RR: Eibisikseu) is a South Korean boy band formed by Brand New Music. The group currently consists of four members: Jeon Woong, Kim Dong-hyun, Park Woo-jin and Lee Dae-hwi. Former leader Lim Young-min's departure from the group was announced on June 8, 2020.

The group debuted on May 22, 2019, with their first EP titled B:Complete.

== Name ==
AB6IX is short for "Absolute Six" meaning that the absolute completeness of Brand New Boys, which is finally complete by combining the five members and the fandom, and the transcendental symbol of the five members and the fandom who will open a new horizon for Brand New Music which means "Above BrandNew Six".

== History ==
=== Pre-debut ===
Lim Young-min, Kim Dong-hyun, Park Woo-jin and Lee Dae-hwi participated in the Mnet survival series Produce 101 Season 2 in 2017. Dae-hwi and Woo-jin placed 3rd and 6th respectively, becoming members of the temporary boy group Wanna One. Young-min and Dong-hyun placed 15th and 28th respectively. In 2018, Dae-hwi was involved with many solo activities, including taking part in the Global MC Crew on M Countdown (on which he became a permanent host in April 2019) and being a special MC on other music shows such as Inkigayo and KCON during 2017–2018 on its Japan, Thailand, Australia, and New York stops.

Young-min and Dong-hyun debuted as the duo MXM in September 2017 with their first EP titled Unmix. The duo's name stands for "Mix and Match" and "More and More," with both having different meanings for the group. The former showcases how compatible they are as a group and the latter emphasizes their ever-growing determination for growth in the music industry. In March, they released their second EP, Match Up. In August, just 11 months after debuting, they released their first full-length album, More Than Ever, which marks the last chapter of their MIX, MATCH, MORE trilogy. The duo went on tour to 9 cities around the world and also had 4 sold out fan signs and meetings. Dae-hwi also participated in the album by producing "Hoping That You'd Love Me" and "Dawn". MXM, along with fellow Produce 101 season 2 contestants Jeong Se-woon and Lee Gwang-hyun, formed Starship and Brand New Music's project group YDPP.

Woo-jin and Dae-hwi collaborated on the single, "Candle", on January 29, 2019.

Jeon Woong had previously been a trainee under JYP, Woollim, and YG Entertainment. His pre-debut appearances include Infinite H's M/V "As Long As You're Not Crazy" and the Mnet survival show Stray Kids, as a YG trainee in the JYP vs YG episodes.

Prior to their debut, Dae-hwi composed the song "Airplane" for the mini album Heart*Iz, released on April 1, 2019, by girl group Iz*One.

=== 2019–2020: Debut, early days and Young-min's departure ===
On January 9, 2019, Brand New Music announced that would be debut boy group with Brand New Boys (tentative name) including Lee Dae-hwi, Park Woo-jin, Lim Young-min and Kim Dong-hyun. On March 29, Brand New Music confirmed that the group would debut as "AB6IX" in May with the five-member group. The group's debut reality show BrandNewBoys premiered on April 18 on Mnet. The reality show followed the story of the five members as they prepare for their debut featured fun behind-the-scenes footage of their everyday lives and also revealed their fifth member, Jeon Woong to complete the group's line-up debut. On April 26, AB6IX released the performance music video for "Hollywood". Lee Dae-hwi participated in writing and Park Woo-jin choreographed the song "Hollywood", which was performed on "Produce 101 Season 2" for the agency evaluation. AB6IX debuted on May 22 with their debut EP B:Complete and its composed of seven-track including the lead single "Breathe". They held their debut showcase on the same day at Olympic Hall. This album contains seven tracks, combining the works from all five members, coming from very different musical backgrounds. The group made their debut stage on May 23 at Mnet's M Countdown with performance "Hollywood" and "Breathe". On June 5, they won their first music show trophy on MBC Music's Show Champion. On July 27, AB6IX held their first fan meeting, called "1st ABNEW," in Singapore at The Star Theatre to celebrate the release of their debut EP B:Complete. On September 24, AB6IX collaborated with Lizzo on a remix of her song "Truth Hurts," originally released in 2017. On October 7, AB6IX released their first studio album 6ixense and its lead single "Blind for Love". The album peaked at #30 on Billboard's Social 50 Chart on October 15 after being on there for 4 weeks. On November 9, the group held their first solo concert titled "6ixense" in South Korea at Olympic Gymnastics Arena.

On February 13, 2020, AB6IX released their digital EP 5nally, an EP that contains five solo tracks for each member. On February 7, it was announced the European leg of their 6IXENSE tour was cancelled due to health concerns over the COVID-19 pandemic and later on March 11, it was announced that they would also cancel the U.S. leg of the tour. On June 8, Brand New Music announced that Young-min would be leaving the group following his DUI. As a result, the group's comeback with their second EP Vivid and its lead single "The Answer", originally scheduled for June 8, was postponed to June 29. On August 25, it was announced that AB6IX would be holding their first online solo concert titled "So Vivid" on September 12. AB6IX released their third EP Salute and its lead single of the same name on November 2.

=== 2021–2022: International collaborations, Mo' Complete series, Japanese debut, A to B and Savior ===
On January 7, 2021, AB6IX released a remix of Why Don't We's "Fallin' (Adrenaline)". On January 18, the group released the repackaged version of their third EP titled Salute: A New Hope and its lead single "Stay Young". On April 26, AB6IX released their fourth EP Mo' Complete: Have a Dream and its lead single "Close". On May 24, AB6IX released the promotional single "Gemini" through Universe Music for the mobile application, Universe. On September 27, their second studio album Mo' Complete was released which contains ten-tracks including the lead single "Cherry". The album was features genre such as hip-hop, R&B, punk pop, electropop, synthpop and deep house, which all-members also participated to write and composed the song in the album. On November 24, AB6IX made their Japanese debut under Victor Entertainment with their first Japanese EP Absolute 6ix.

On January 17, 2022, AB6IX released the special album Complete with You. Marketed as "special album", the EP was consists of five-track including the dance-pop lead single "1,2,3" and solo track from each members. The group released their fifth EP A to B on May 18. It consists of five tracks, including the lead single "Savior" and a whole EP incorporating with the hip hop, R&B and Pop rock genre. The group's through their media showcase cited that the EP would shows their "mature" concept with "sexy" side unlike their previous released and also confirmed that all-member participated in the EP productions.

In June, AB6IX began their fan meeting tour 'AB_NEW AREA', with the first events held on June 4 and 5 in Seoul. They then had evens in Japan and the United States. Then, on August 27, they held a fan meeting in Bangkok, Thailand. On August 17, AB6IX released their second Japanese EP Savior. On August 27, they released special single for their fans "Chance", also marks their first english single since debut. On September 15, AB6IX released the song "Moonlight", a collaboration with Faroese singer Reiley. On October 4, their sixth EP Take a Chance was released which contains seven-track including the lead single "Sugarcoat" and a Korean version of "Chance".

=== 2023–present: The Future Is Ours series ===
In March 2023, Victor Entertainment announced that AB6IX would be released their first original Japanese single "Fly Away" on May 10, and also announced that the single would be play as the ending theme of Fuji TV anime Fugitive Great Mission started in April 2023. AB6IX released their seventh extended play The Future is Ours: Lost on May 29.

Their eighth EP The Future Is Ours: Found was released on January 22, 2024. The EP is composed of five tracks, with the pop rock song "Grab Me" serving as the lead single.

== Other ventures ==
=== Endorsements ===
Before the official debut of AB6IX, the members were selected as a beauty model of the Korean beauty brand "Acwell" on April 24, 2019.

On August 29, 2019, AB6IX was chosen as the new model of "Elite" uniform for the 2020 new semester. On September 25, 2019, AB6IX was appointed as the image cast of ABC-Mart for product "Nike Court Vision".

=== Ambassadorship ===
On September 19, 2019, AB6IX was officially appointed as the newest ambassadors for Korea Scout Association. On February 20, 2020, AB6IX was appointed as public relations ambassador for Youth Cyber Violence Prevention Education Program by Samsung Group, Green Tree Foundation and Social Welfare Community Chest.

== Members ==
Adapted from their official website.

=== Present members ===
- Jeon Woong (전웅)
- Kim Dong-hyun (김동현)
- Park Woo-jin (박우진)
- Lee Dae-hwi (이대휘)

=== Former members ===
- Lim Young-min (임영민)

== Discography ==
=== Studio albums ===
List of studio albums, with selected details, chart positions and sales
Title	Details	Peak chart positions		Sales
Title	Details	KOR	JPN	Sales
6ixense	Released: October 7, 2019; Label: Brand New Music, Warner Music Korea; Formats: CD, digital download, streaming	2	25	KOR: 143,229; JPN: 5,064 (Phy.)
Mo' Complete	Released: September 27, 2021; Label: Brand New Music, Warner Music Korea; Formats: CD, digital download, streaming; Track listing: 1. "Showdown"; 2. "Level Up"; 3. "Cherry"; 4. "Down for You"; 5. "Do You Remember" (그해 여름); 6. "Stay with Me" (사라지지 마); 7. "Believe" (믿어); 8. "Off the Record"; 9. "Simple Lover"; 10. "3”"	2	23	KOR: 101,604; JPN: 1,942 (Phy.)
Seven: Crimson Horizon	Released: March 16, 2026; Label: Brand New Music, Warner Music Korea; Formats: CD, digital download, streaming; Track listing: 1. "Given"; 2. "Bottoms Up"; 3. "Forever"; 4. "So Sweet (0522)"; 5. "Piece of Youth" (어제와 닮은 오늘이 생각보다 따뜻하니까; Woong solo); 6. "Holiday" (Woojin solo); 7. "Sometimes" (그런 날; Daehwi solo); 8. "Your Tomorrow" (잘 자, 내일 봐; Donghyun solo); 9. "Faded Trail"; 10. "Side by Side" (같이 걷자); 11. "Endless"	5	—	KOR: 31,622

=== Reissues ===
Title	Details	Peak chart positions	Sales
Title	Details	KOR	Sales
Salute: A New Hope	Released: January 18, 2021; Label: Brand New Music, Warner Music Korea; Formats: CD, digital download, streaming; Track listing: 1. "Apricity"; 2. "Stay Young" (불시착); 3. "Encore" (앵콜) (feat. ABNEW); 4. "Mirror"; 5. "Salute"; 6. "Heaven"; 7. "Maybe" (이게 그리움이 아니라면 대체 뭐겠어); 8. "Bloom"; 9. "Behind You" (한걸음 뒤에 서서); 10. "Surreal" (초현실) (Alternative Rock Mix); 11. "Blind for Love" (Nu Disco Mix); 12. "Salute" (Inst.); 13. "Stay Young" (불시착) (Inst.)	4	KOR: 71,727

=== Extended plays ===
==== Korean ====
List of extended plays, with selected details, chart positions and sales
Title	Details	Peak chart positions		Sales
Title	Details	KOR	JPN	Sales
B:Complete	Released: May 22, 2019; Label: Brand New Music, Warner Music Korea; Formats: CD, digital download, streaming	2	10	KOR: 171,578; JPN: 6,741
5nally	Released: February 13, 2020; Label: Brand New Music, Warner Music Korea; Formats: Digital download, streaming; Track listing: 1. "Moondance"; 2. "More" (더 더); 3. "Rose, Scent, Kiss"; 4. "Break Up" (좋게 끝내); 5. "Color Eye"	—	—	—N/a
Vivid	Released: June 29, 2020; Label: Brand New Music, Warner Music Korea; Formats: CD, digital download, streaming	3	12	KOR: 139,900; JPN: 5,058
Salute	Released: November 2, 2020; Label: Brand New Music, Warner Music Korea; Formats: CD, digital download, streaming; Track listing: 1. "Mirror"; 2. "Salute"; 3. "Heaven"; 4. "Maybe" (이게 그리움이 아니라면 대체 뭐겠어); 5. "Bloom"; 6. "Behind You" (한걸음 뒤에 서서)	5	35	KOR: 106,682; JPN: 6,627
Mo' Complete: Have a Dream	Released: April 26, 2021; Label: Brand New Music, Warner Music Korea; Formats: CD, digital download, streaming; Track listing: 1. "Headline"; 2. "Close" (감아); 3. "Lululala" (룰루랄라); 4. "Merry-Go-Round" (회전목마); 5. "A Long Winter" (아직도 겨울)	3	50	KOR: 93,446; JPN: 940
Complete with You	Released: January 17, 2022; Label: Brand New Music, Warner Music Korea; Formats: CD, digital download, streaming; Track listing: 1. "1, 2, 3"; 2. "Venus"; 3. "Consolation" (위로); 4. "Crazy Love"; 5. "In Your Eyes" (너의 눈에 내가 보여서)	9	—	KOR: 51,824
A to B	Released: May 18, 2022; Label: Brand New Music, Warner Music Korea; Formats: CD, digital download, streaming; Track listing: 1. "Parachute"; 2. "Savior"; 3. "Sucker for Your Love" (우리가 헤어젔던 이유); 4. "Einstein" (아니슈타인); 5. "We Could Love"	4	—	KOR: 67,564
Take a Chance	Released: October 4, 2022; Label: Brand New Music, Warner Music Korea; Formats: CD, digital download, streaming; Track listing: 1. "Paranoia"; 2. "Sugarcoat"; 3. "Weightless"; 4. "Complicated"; 5. "Resonance"; 6. "Crow"; 7. "Chance" (Korean ver.)	4	—	KOR: 76,866
The Future Is Ours: Lost	Released: May 29, 2023; Label: Brand New Music, Warner Music Korea; Formats: CD, digital download, streaming	7	—	KOR: 83,046
The Future Is Ours: Found	Released: January 22, 2024; Label: Brand New Music, Warner Music Korea; Formats: CD, digital download, streaming	3	—	KOR: 106,967
Born Like This	Released: October 10, 2024; Label: Brand New Music, Warner Music Korea; Formats: CD, digital download, streaming	3	39	KOR: 74,069; JPN: 840
Upside Down	Released: August 25, 2025; Label: Brand New Music, Warner Music Korea; Formats: CD, digital download, streaming	9	—	KOR: 58,926
"—" denotes releases that did not chart or were not released in that region.

==== Japanese ====
List of extended plays, with selected details, chart positions and sales
Title	Details	Peak chart positions	Sales
Title	Details	JPN	Sales
Absolute 6ix	Released: November 24, 2021; Label: Victor Entertainment; Formats: CD, digital download, streaming; Track listing: 1. "Breathe" (Japanese ver.); 2. "Cherry" (Japanese ver.); 3. "Close" (Japanese ver.); 4. "Hollywood" (English ver.); 5. "Shining Stars" (Japanese ver.)	15	JPN: 6,730
Savior	Released: August 17, 2022; Label: Victor Entertainment; Formats: CD, digital download, streaming; Track listing: 1. "Savior" (Japanese ver.); 2. "Set You Free"; 3. "Umbrella"; 4. "Sucker for Your Love" (Japanese ver.); 5. "Savior" (instrumental)	8	JPN: 8,276
Trap/Grab Me (Japanese ver.)	Released: July 3, 2024; Label: Victor Entertainment; Formats: CD, digital download, streaming	18	JPN: 2,238

=== Singles ===
List of singles, with selected chart positions, showing year released and album name
Title	Year	Peak chart positions			Album
Title	Year	KOR	KOR Hot	JPN	Album
"Breathe"	2019	79	26	—	B:Complete
"Blind for Love"	2019	67	81	—	6ixense
"The Answer" (답을 줘)	2020	70	—	—	Vivid
"Salute"	2020	93	—	—	Salute
"Stay Young" (불시착)	2021	58	—	—	Salute: A New Hope
"Close" (감아)	2021	57	—	—	Mo' Complete: Have a Dream
"Cherry"	2021	56	—	—	Mo' Complete
"1, 2, 3"	2022	— (Note: "1, 2, 3" did not enter the Gaon Digital Chart, but peaked at number 52 on the Gaon Download Chart.)	—	—	Complete with You
"Savior"	2022	105	—N/a	—	A to B
"Sugarcoat"	2022	— (Note: "Sugarcoat" did not enter the Circle Digital Chart, but peaked at number 43 on the Circle Download Chart.)	—N/a	—	Take a Chance
"Fly Away"	2023	—	—N/a	33	Non-album single
"Loser"	2023	175	—N/a	—	The Future Is Ours: Lost
"Grab Me"	2024	150	—N/a	—	The Future Is Ours: Found
"Nvked"	2024	— (Note: "Nvked" did not enter the Circle Digital Chart, but peaked at number 6 on the Circle Download Chart.)	—N/a	—	Born Like This
"Stupid"	2025	— (Note: "Stupid" did not enter the Circle Digital Chart, but peaked at number 33 on the Circle Download Chart.)	—N/a	—	Upside Down
"Bottoms Up"	2026	— (Note: "Bottoms Up" did not enter the Circle Digital Chart, but peaked at number 20 on the Circle Download Chart.)	—N/a	—	Seven: Crimson Horizon
"—" denotes releases that did not chart or were not released in that region.

=== Other charted songs ===
Title	Year	Peak chart positions	Album
Title	Year	KOR	Album
"Hollywood"	2019	190	B:Complete

=== Other releases ===
Title	Year	Peak chart positions	Album
Title	Year	KOR Down.	Album
Soundtrack appearances
"Hold You" (잡아줄게)	2020	—	Let Me Off the Earth OST
As featured artist
"Truth Hurts" (Lizzo featuring AB6IX)	2019	—	Non-album singles
"Fallin' (Adrenaline)" (Why Don't We featuring AB6IX)	2021	—	Non-album singles
Collaborations
"Melting" (with Kanto, Kang Min-hee, Yo Da-young and BDC)	2019	—	Brandnew Year 2019 'Do That Brandnew Thing'
"Chandelier" (샹들리에) (with BDC and Lee Eun-sang)	2020	—	Brandnew Year 2020 'Brandnew Up'
"Moonlight" (with Reiley)	2022	—	Non-album single
Promotional singles
"Gemini" (promotional single for Universe)	2021	36	Non-album single
"—" denotes releases that did not chart or were not released in that region.

== Videography ==
=== Music videos ===
Year	Title	Director(s)
2019	"Hollywood" (Performance video)	Digipedi
2019	"Breathe"	Digipedi
2019	"Breathe" (Performance version)	Digipedi
2019	"Blind For Love"	Digipedi
2019	"Blind For Love" (Performance version)	Digipedi
2020	"Moondance"	Desert Beagle
2020	"More"	Desert Beagle
2020	"Rose, Scent, Kiss"	Desert Beagle
2020	"Break Up"	Desert Beagle
2020	"Color Eye"	Desert Beagle
2020	"The Answer" (답을 줘)	SOOB
2020	"Surreal" (초현실) (Live version)	Micah Bickham
2020	"Salute"	ETUI Collective
2020	"Salute" (Performance version)	ETUI Collective
2021	"Stay Young" (불시착)	August Frogs
2021	"Stay Young" (Performance version)	August Frogs
2021	"Close" (감아)	Lee Gi-baek (BOLD Creative Studio)
2021	"Close" (감아) (Performance version)	Lee Gi-baek (BOLD Creative Studio)
2021	"Cherry"	Lee Gi-baek (BOLD Creative Studio)
2021	"Cherry" (Performance version)	Lee Gi-baek (BOLD Creative Studio)
2021	"Cherry" (Japanese version)	Lee Gi-baek (BOLD Creative Studio)
2021	"Gemini"	Unknown
2022	"1,2,3" (Performance M/V)	Lee Gi-baek (BOLD Creative Studio)
2022	"Savior"	Lee Gi-baek (BOLD Creative Studio)
2022	"Savior" (Performance version)	Lee Gi-baek (BOLD Creative Studio)
2022	"Savior" (Japanese version)	Lee Gi-baek (BOLD Creative Studio)
2022	"Sugarcoat"	Kim Ja-kyoung (Flexible Pictures)
2022	"Sugarcoat" (Performance version)	Kim Ja-kyoung (Flexible Pictures)
2023	"Fly Away"	Atural Production
2023	"Loser"	Park Seok-kyu (NDVISUAL)
2023	"Loser" (Performance version)	Park Seok-kyu (NDVISUAL)
2024	"Grab Me"	Kim Ja-kyong (Flexible Pictures)

=== Album videos ===
Year	Title	Details
2020	AB6IX 1st World Tour <6ixense> In Seoul DVD	Released: July 5, 2020; Label: Brand New Music; Formats: DVD + Photobook
2020	AB6IX 1st World Tour <6ixense> In Seoul Blu-ray	Released: June 10, 2020; Label: Brand New Music; Formats: Blu-ray + Photobook
2020	AB6IX 1st Photobook In Jeju 19522	Released: November 12, 2020; Label: Brand New Music; Formats: DVD + Photobook

== Filmography ==
=== Reality shows ===
Year	Title	Episodes	Notes	Ref.
2019	Brand New Boys	8	Mnet	
2019	AB6IX Loyalty Game	6	YouTube (Dingo Music)	
2020	AB4U	4	V Live	
2020	Bu:QUEST	8	YouTube (Idollive), U+ Idol Live	
2020	AB4U Season 2	6	YouTube	
2020	Star Wars	2	YouTube (Dingo Music)	
2021	Peaceful AB6IX	20	YouTube	
2021	IDOLPicknic	2	U+ Idol Live	
2021	The Birth Of Four Gods	10	Universe	
2021	Parasite Challenge	7	Universe	
2021	YeppiThai	2	YouTube (M2)	

=== Web series ===
Year	Title	Network	Member(s)	Role	Notes	Ref.
2020	Let Me Off The Earth	Naver TV Cast	All	Ahn Se-min's co-workers	Cameo (Ep. 17)	

=== Television shows ===
Year	Title	Network	Ref.
2023	Chill Club	ViuTV	
2023	Where Do Do you go	HOYTV	

== Concerts and tours ==
=== Showcase ===
- AB6IX 1st Debut Showcase "B:Complete" (2019)
- AB6IX 1st Album Showcase "6ixense" (2019)
- AB6IX 3rd EP Online Showcase "Salute" (2020)
- AB6IX 4th EP Comeback Showcase "Mo Complete: Have A Dream" (2021)

=== Online concert ===
- AB6IX Online Concert "So Vivid" (2020)

=== Headlining tour ===
- AB6IX 1st World Tour "6ixense" (2019–2020)
- AB6IX Fanmeeting Tour "AB_NEW AREA" (2022)

== Awards and nominations ==
=== Korean ===
Year	Award	Nominee(s)/work(s)	Result	Ref.
Soribada Best K-Music Awards
2019	Male Popularity	AB6IX	Nominated	
2019	Main Prize (Bonsang)	AB6IX	Won	
2020	Main Prize (Bonsang)	AB6IX	Won	
2020	Male Popularity	AB6IX	Nominated	
2020	Global Artist	AB6IX	Nominated	
Asia Artist Awards
2019	StarNews Popularity Award	AB6IX	Nominated	
2019	Favorite Group	AB6IX	Nominated	
2019	Rookie of the Year	AB6IX	Won	
2020	Best Icon Award	AB6IX	Won	
2020	Male Popularity	AB6IX	Nominated	
Melon Music Awards
2019	Hot Trend Award	AB6IX	Won	
Golden Disc Awards
2019	Next Generation Artist Award	AB6IX	Won	
2019	Rookie of the Year	AB6IX	Nominated	
2019	Popularity Award	AB6IX	Nominated	
2019	Album Bonsang	B:Complete	Nominated	
Genie Music Awards
2019	Genie Music Popularity Award	AB6IX	Nominated	
2019	Global Popularity Award	AB6IX	Nominated	
2019	The Top Artist	AB6IX	Nominated	
2019	The Male New Artist	AB6IX	Nominated	
2019	Next Generation Star	AB6IX	Won	
Seoul Music Awards
2019	New Artist Award	AB6IX	Won	
2019	Popularity Award	AB6IX	Nominated	
2019	K-Wave Popularity Award	AB6IX	Nominated	
2019	QQ Music Most Popular K-Pop Artist Award	AB6IX	Nominated	
Mnet Asian Music Awards
2019	Best New Male Artist	AB6IX	Nominated	
2019	Artist of the Year	AB6IX	Nominated	
2019	Worldwide Fans' Choice	AB6IX	Nominated	

=== International ===
Year	Award	Nominee(s)/work(s)	Result	Ref.
Starhub Night of Stars
2019	Rising Star Award	AB6IX	Won	
Mnet Japan Awards
2019	Variety Category	Brandnewboys	Won	
MTV Europe Music Awards
2019	Best Korean Act	AB6IX	Nominated	

=== Other awards ===
Year	Award	Nominee(s)/work(s)	Result	Ref.
Korea First Brand Awards
2019	New Male Artist	AB6IX	Won	
2022	Male Idol Rising Star Award	AB6IX	Nominated	
Brand Customer Loyalty Award
2020	Rising Star - Male Idol	AB6IX	Won	
2021	Hot Trend Male Idol Group	AB6IX	Nominated	
Brand of the Year Awards
2020	Rising Star - Male Idol	AB6IX	Won	
V Live Awards
2019	Global Rookie Top 5	AB6IX	Won	
2019	The Most Loved Artist	AB6IX	Nominated	
