= 35 Boys 5 Concepts =

Extended play

EP by Produce 101 contestants
- Released: June 3, 2017
- Length: 16:28
- Language: Korean
- Label: CJ E&M

35 Boys 5 Concepts is an EP by contestants of the South Korean survival show Produce 101 Season 2. It was released online for download on June 3, 2017, by CJ E&M.

== Background ==
Produce 101 Season 2 was a South Korean survival show that aired on Mnet from April to June in 2017 where 101 male trainees from various entertainment companies competed to debut in an 11-member boy group which would promote until December 2018.

On the 8th and 9th episode, the 35 remaining trainees were split into five teams and given five new songs from different producers, with different genres. They were tasked to perform these songs live in front of total audience of 2000. The nu-disco song "Show Time" was produced by Veethoven, Oh Sung Hwan, ASHTRAY and Kingmaker. The synth pop/funk song "I Know You Know" was produced by Jeff Lewis, nomad, MRey, and Hyuk Shin who has worked with many major artists in K-pop industry, including Exo, Shinee, f(x), Girls' Generation and Teen Top. The Future EDM song "열어줘 (Open Up)" was produced by Devine Channel who has composed BTS's Fire and VIXX's Shangri-La. The hip hop song "Oh Little Girl" was produced by ASSBRASS (Note: Rarely credited under the real name of Kwon-Eek Jeong, has recently worked on hits with San E, Verbal Jint, Swing and Seo In-guk.) and Phantom's Kiggen from Brand New Music, and the deep house song "Never" was produced by Cube Entertainment's PENTAGON and Triple H.

== Track listing ==
No.	Title	Lyrics	Music	Arrangement	Length
1.	"Show Time" (It's)	Oh Sung-hwan, ASHTRAY, Kingmaker (Yun Yeo-hun)	Veethoven, Oh Sung-hwan, ASHTRAY, Kingmaker (Yun Yeo-hun)	Veethoven, Oh Sung-hwan, ASHTRAY	3:16
2.	"I Know You Know" (Boys Under The Moon (월하소년 - 月下少年))	Mafly, Keyfly	Hyuk Shin, Jeff Lewis, nomad, MRey	Hyuk Shin, nomad	3:11
3.	"열어줘 (Open Up)" (Knock)	Yorkie, JQ, Hyeon Ji-won	Devine Channel	Devine Channel	3:36
4.	"Oh Little Girl" (Slate (슬레이트))	Kiggen	ASSBRASS, Kiggen	ASSBRASS	3:26
5.	"Never" (Nation's Sons (국민의 아들))	Hui, E'Dawn, Wooseok	Hui, Flow Blow (Jung Guk-yong, Yang Ha-yi)	Flow Blow	3:21
Total length:					16:28

== Commercial reception ==
On June 3, 2017, "Never" by Nation's Sons achieved an all-kill on Instiz, charting at #1 on real-time charts of Melon, Mnet, Bugs, Soribada, and Naver.
