= Park Woo-jin =

South Korean rapper (born 1999)

- 박우진
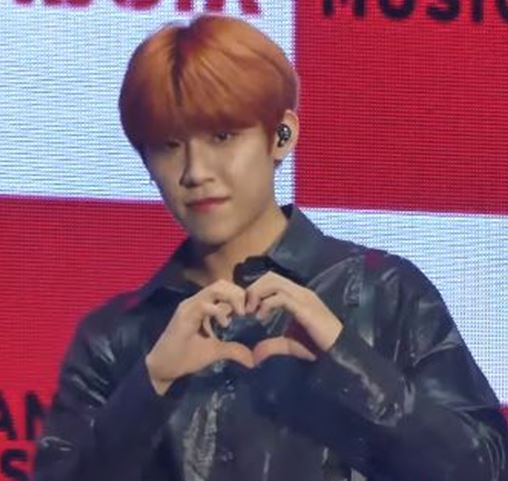
- Park in May 2019
- Born: November 2, 1999 (age 27); Busan, South Korea
- Occupations: Rapper; singer; dancer; songwriter
- Years active: 2017–present
- Musical career
- Genres: K-pop; hip hop
- Instrument: Vocals
- Labels: Brand New Music; YMC (Note: As a member of Wanna One only.); Swing
- Member of: AB6IX
- Formerly of: Wanna One

Korean name
- Hangul: 박우진
- Hanja: 朴佑鎮
- RR: Bak Ujin
- MR: Pak Ujin

Signature
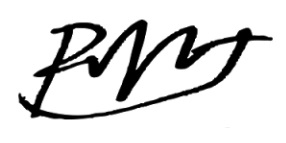

Park Woo-jin (Korean: 박우진, born November 2, 1999), also known mononymously as Woojin, is a South Korean rapper, singer and songwriter. He placed sixth in the second season of Produce 101, becoming a member of the project group Wanna One. He is a member of the boy group AB6IX.

== Career ==
=== Early life and pre-debut ===
Park Woo-jin was born in Busan, South Korea. When he was eleven years old, Park Auditioned for survival program called Superstar K. Park graduated from Korean Arts High School in January 2018. Prior to appearing on season two of Produce 101, Park had trained for one year and two months. He initially started as a trainee under JYP Entertainment and then became a trainee under Brand New Music.

=== 2017–2018: Produce 101 and Wanna One ===
In 2017, Park represented Brand New Music in the boy group reality survival show Produce 101 Season 2. He choreographed the dance to 'Hollywood', which he and his fellow Brand New Music trainees performed at the Produce 101 ranking evaluation.

He is known for finishing at sixth place in the final episode and becoming a member of the project boy group Wanna One under YMC Entertainment.

Park debuted with Wanna One during Wanna One Premier Show-Con on August 7, 2017, at the Gocheok Sky Dome with the debut mini-album 1×1=1 (To Be One).

He promoted with Wanna One's unit "Triple Position", which won the "Best Unit Award" at the 2018 Mnet Asian Music Awards. He concluded his contract with Wanna One on December 31, 2018, although he still appeared with the group until its official farewell concerts on January 24–27, 2019.

=== 2019–present: Solo activities and AB6IX ===
In January 2019, Park collaborated with fellow labelmate Lee Dae-hwi and released a single titled "Candle". In March 2019, Park collaborated with American rapper A Boogie wit da Hoodie and released a Korean version of "Look Back at It". In March 2019, Woojin was confirmed as part of the cast for Law of the Jungle in Thailand.

In May 2019, Park debuted in his label Brand New Music's new boy group called AB6IX.

In February 2023, ahead of the official solo release of Park's EP oWn, which was released on February 27, Brand New Music announced that the song "Self-Portrait" (featuring Kim Jae-hwan) would be released on February 15.

== Discography ==
=== Extended plays ===
List of EPs, with selected details and chart positions
Title	Details	Peak chart positions	Sales
Title	Details	KOR	Sales
oWn	Released: February 27, 2023; Label: Brand New Music; Formats: CD, digital download	12	KOR: 19,200
Solstice	Released: October 13, 2026; Label: Para Music; Formats: CD, digital download	20	KOR: 12,556

=== Single albums ===
List of single albums, with selected details and chart positions
Title	Details	Peak chart positions	Sales
Title	Details	KOR	Sales
Cool & Hot	Released: April 30, 2025; Label: Brand New Music; Formats: CD, digital download	18	KOR: 13,400

=== Songs ===
Title	Year	Peak charts position	Album
Title	Year	KOR	Album
As lead artist
"Color Eye"	2020	— (Note: "Color Eye" did not enter the Circle Digital Chart, but peaked at number 110 on the component Download Chart.)	5nally
"Top Tier"	2023	— (Note: "Top Tier" did not enter the Circle Digital Chart, but peaked at number 46 on the component Download Chart.)	Own
"Cool & Hot" (featuring Ha Sung-woon)	2025	— (Note: "Cool & Hot" did not enter the Circle Digital Chart, but peaked at number 62 on the component Download Chart.)	Cool & Hot
As featured artist
"Never" (Note: Credited as Nation's Sons.) with Produce 101 (season 2) Trainees: Kim Jong-hyeon; Hwang Min-hyun; Ong Seong-wu; Kim Jae-hwan; Lee Dae-hwi; Lai Kuan-lin	2017	2	35 Boys 5 Concepts
"Kangaroo" (캥거루) (Note: Credited as Wanna One unit - Triple Position with Kim Jae-hwan and Kang Daniel.)	2018	6	1÷x=1 (Undivided)
"Paradise" (파라다이스) (Kim Jae-hwan featuring Park Woo-jin)	2019	—	Moment
"Beautiful Scar" (Lee Eun-sang featuring Park Woo-jin)	2020	—	Beautiful Scar
Soundtrack appearance
"Puzzle" (with Soyou)	2021	—	Mr. Queen OST
Collaborations
"Candle" (with Lee Dae-hwi)	2019	60	Non-album singles
"Look Back at It" (Korean version) (with A Boogie wit da Hoodie)	2019	—	Non-album singles
"—" denotes releases that did not chart or were not released in that region.

== Filmography ==
=== Television show ===
Year	Title	Role	Note(s)	Ref.
2017	Produce 101 Season 2	Contestant	Finished in sixth place	
2019	Law of the Jungle in Thailand	Cast		

=== Television series ===
Year	Title	Role	Note(s)	Ref.
2026	My Love Story That Only I Don't Know	Seo Gi-tak	Short-form drama	
