= Wanna One discography =

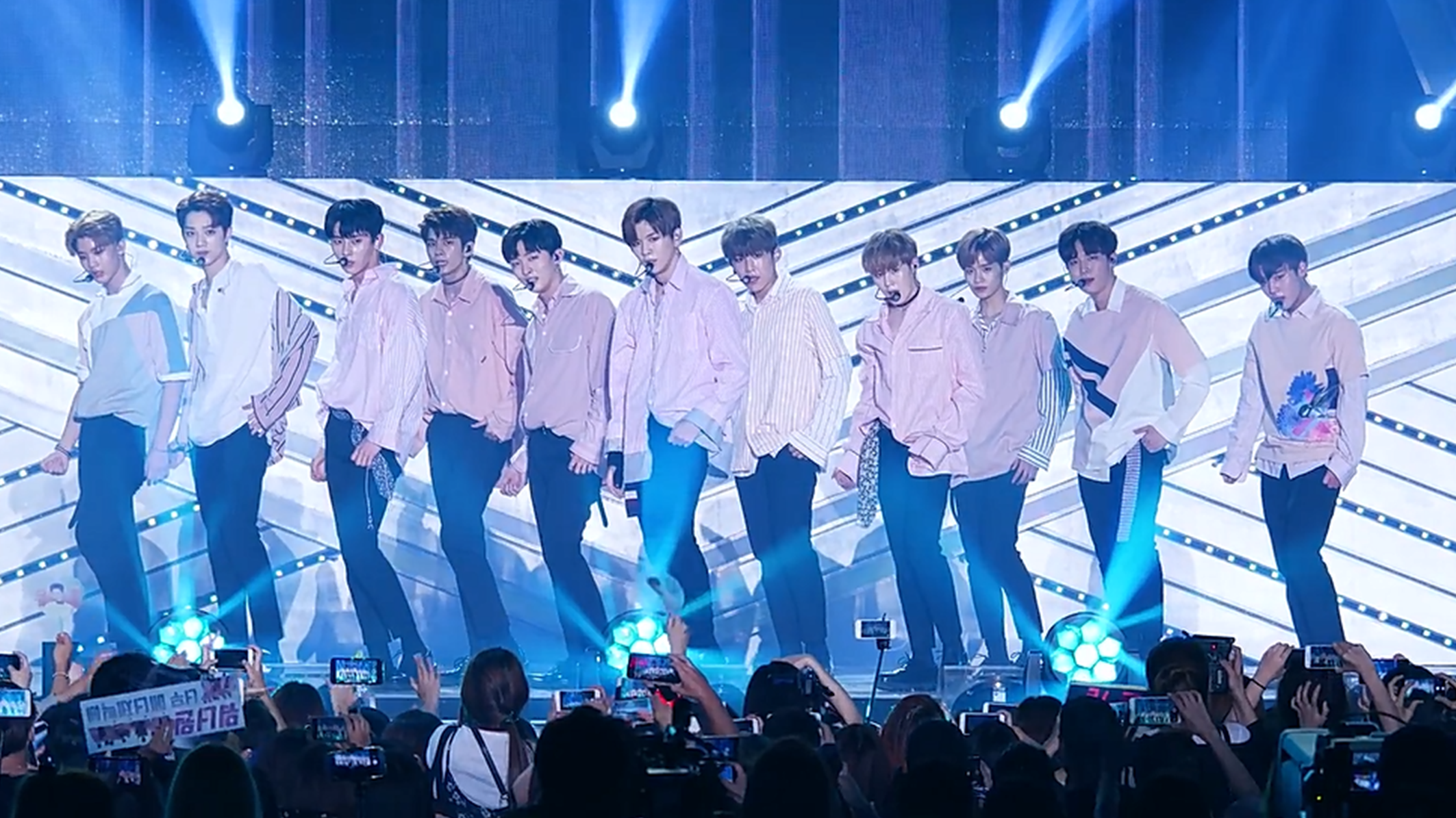
- Studio albums: 1
- EPs: 3
- Singles: 8
- Music videos: 11

The discography of the South Korean boy group Wanna One, an 11-member band formed through the 'survival' competition Produce 101 Season 2 in 2017 and was under Korean entertainment company Stone Music Entertainment.

The group's debut release was the EP 1X1=1 (To Be One), which was released on August 7, 2017.

== Studio albums ==
List of studio albums, with selected details and chart positions
Title	Details	Peak chart positions				Sales	Certifications (Note: In April 2018, Gaon Chart introduced music recording certifications for albums, downloads and streamings.)
Title	Details	KOR	JPN	JPN Hot	US World	Sales	Certifications
1¹¹=1 (Power of Destiny)	Released: November 19, 2018; Label: Swing Entertainment; Formats: CD, digital download, streaming	1	3	35	12	KOR: 730,257; JPN: 96,304 (phy.); JPN: 945 (dig.)	KMCA: 2× Platinum

== Extended plays ==
List of extended plays, with selected chart positions and sales
Title	Details	Peak chart positions					Sales	Certifications
Title	Details	KOR	FRA	JPN	JPN Hot	US World	Sales	Certifications
1×1=1 (To Be One)	Released: August 7, 2017; Label: YMC Entertainment; Formats: CD, digital download, streaming	1	151	4	6	3	KOR: 1,463,978; JPN: 81,010; US: 3,000	—N/a
1×1=1 (To Be One)	Released: November 13, 2017 (1-1=0 (Nothing Without You)); Label: YMC Entertainment; Formats: CD, digital download, streaming	1	—	8	51	12	KOR: 1,463,978; JPN: 81,010; US: 3,000	—N/a
0+1=1 (I Promise You)	Released: March 19, 2018; Label: YMC Entertainment; Formats: CD, digital download, streaming	1	—	2	32	10	KOR: 785,578; JPN: 53,515	KMCA: 3× Platinum
1÷x=1 (Undivided)	Released: June 4, 2018; Label: Swing Entertainment; Formats: CD, digital download, streaming	1	—	2	—	8	KOR: 644,771; JPN: 70,140 (phy.); JPN: 825 (dig.)	KMCA: 2× Platinum
"—" denotes releases that did not chart or were not released in that region.

== Singles ==
List of singles, with selected chart positions, showing year released and album name
Title	Year	Peak chart positions				Sales	Album
Title	Year	KOR	KOR Hot	JPN Hot	US World	Sales	Album
"Energetic" (에너제틱)	2017	1	2	—	6	KOR: 2,500,000; US: 9,000	1x1=1 (To Be One)
"Burn It Up" (활할)	2017	4	9	—	—	KOR: 590,280	1x1=1 (To Be One)
"Beautiful"	2017	1	1	—	15	KOR: 2,500,000	1-1=0 (Nothing Without You)
"I Promise You (I.P.U.)" (약속해요)	2018	5	2	78	—	—N/a	0+1=1 (I Promise You)
"Boomerang" (부메랑)	2018	3	1	—	—	—N/a	0+1=1 (I Promise You)
"Light" (켜줘)	2018	2	3	—	—	—N/a	1÷x=1 (Undivided)
"Spring Breeze" (봄바람)	2018	3	1	—	—	—N/a	1¹¹=1 (Power of Destiny)
"Beautiful Part.3"	2022	165	—	—	—	—N/a	Non-album single
"—" denotes releases that did not chart or were not released in that region.

== Soundtrack appearances ==
List of soundtrack appearances, with selected chart positions, showing year released and album name
Title	Year	Peak chart position	Album
Title	Year	KOR	Album
"We Wanna Go"	2026	—	We Wanna Go (Wanna One Go: Back to Base OST)
"Spring Breeze, Again" (다시, 봄바람)	2026	—	Spring Breeze, Again (Wanna One Go: Back to Base OST)
"—" denotes releases that did not chart or were not released in that region.

== Other charted songs ==
Title	Year	Peak chart positions		Sales	Album
Title	Year	KOR	KOR Hot	Sales	Album
"Wanna Be (My Baby)"	2017	7	8	KOR: 376,019	1x1=1 (To Be One)
"Always (acoustic version)" (이 자리에)	2017	10	33	KOR: 175,529	1x1=1 (To Be One)
"To Be One (Intro)"	2017	18	44	KOR: 108,710	1x1=1 (To Be One)
"Wanna" (갖고 싶어)	2017	3	2	KOR: 293,485	1-1=0 (Nothing Without You)
"Twilight"	2017	7	3	KOR: 204,632	1-1=0 (Nothing Without You)
"Nothing Without You (Intro)"	2017	14	4	KOR: 109,566	1-1=0 (Nothing Without You)
"To Be One (Outro)"	2017	25	6	KOR: 67,723	1-1=0 (Nothing Without You)
"Energetic (Prequel Remix)" (에너제틱)	2017	28	5	KOR: 64,781	1-1=0 (Nothing Without You)
"Burn It Up (Prequel Remix)" (활활)	2017	29	7	KOR: 63,495	1-1=0 (Nothing Without You)
"Gold"	2018	32	3	—N/a	0+1=1 (I Promise You)
"I'll Remember" (너의 이름을)	2018	39	4	—N/a	0+1=1 (I Promise You)
"Day by Day" (보여)	2018	44	5	—N/a	0+1=1 (I Promise You)
"We Are"	2018	50	6	—N/a	0+1=1 (I Promise You)
"I Promise You (Propose version)" (약속해요 (고백 ver.))	2018	51	7	—N/a	0+1=1 (I Promise You)
"Kangaroo" (캥거루) (Triple Position) (Note: Kang Daniel, Kim Jae-hwan, Park Woo-jin)	2018	6	4	—N/a	1÷x=1 (Undivided)
"Hourglass" (모래시계) (The Heal) (Note: Ong Seong-wu, Lee Dae-hwi)	2018	9	6	—N/a	1÷x=1 (Undivided)
"Forever and a Day" (영원+1) (Lean On Me) (Note: Yoon Ji-sung, Ha Sung-woon, Hwang Min-hyun)	2018	12	9	—N/a	1÷x=1 (Undivided)
"11" (No.1) (Note: Park Ji-hoon, Bae Jin-young, Lai Kuanlin)	2018	17	11	—N/a	1÷x=1 (Undivided)
"One's Place" (집)	2018	19	2	—N/a	1¹¹=1 (Power of Destiny)
"Flowerbomb" (불꽃놀이)	2018	20	3	—N/a	1¹¹=1 (Power of Destiny)
"One Love" (묻고싶다)	2018	25	4	—N/a	1¹¹=1 (Power of Destiny)
"Hide and Seek" (술래)	2018	27	5	—N/a	1¹¹=1 (Power of Destiny)
"Deeper"	2018	30	6	—N/a	1¹¹=1 (Power of Destiny)
"Beautiful (Part II)"	2018	31	7	—N/a	1¹¹=1 (Power of Destiny)
"Awake!"	2018	36	8	—N/a	1¹¹=1 (Power of Destiny)
"Pine Tree" (소나무)	2018	38	9	—N/a	1¹¹=1 (Power of Destiny)
"Destiny (Intro)"	2018	51	10	—N/a	1¹¹=1 (Power of Destiny)

== Music videos ==
Title	Year	Director(s)	Ref.
"Energetic"	2017	Zanybros	
"Energetic" (Performance version)	2017	Zanybros	
"Burn It Up" (Extended version)	2017	Baik	
"Wanna Be (My Baby)" (Live version)	2017	Zanybros	
"Beautiful" (Movie version)	2017	Yong Yi	
"Beautiful" (Performance version)	2017	Zanybros	
"I Promise You (I.P.U.)"	2018	Digipedi	
"Boomerang"	2018	Zanybros	
"Light"	2018	Naive Creative Production	
"Spring Breeze"	2018	Naive Creative Production	
"Beautiful (Part.3)"	2022	Unknown	
