= List of awards and nominations received by Wanna One =

Wanna One awards and nominations
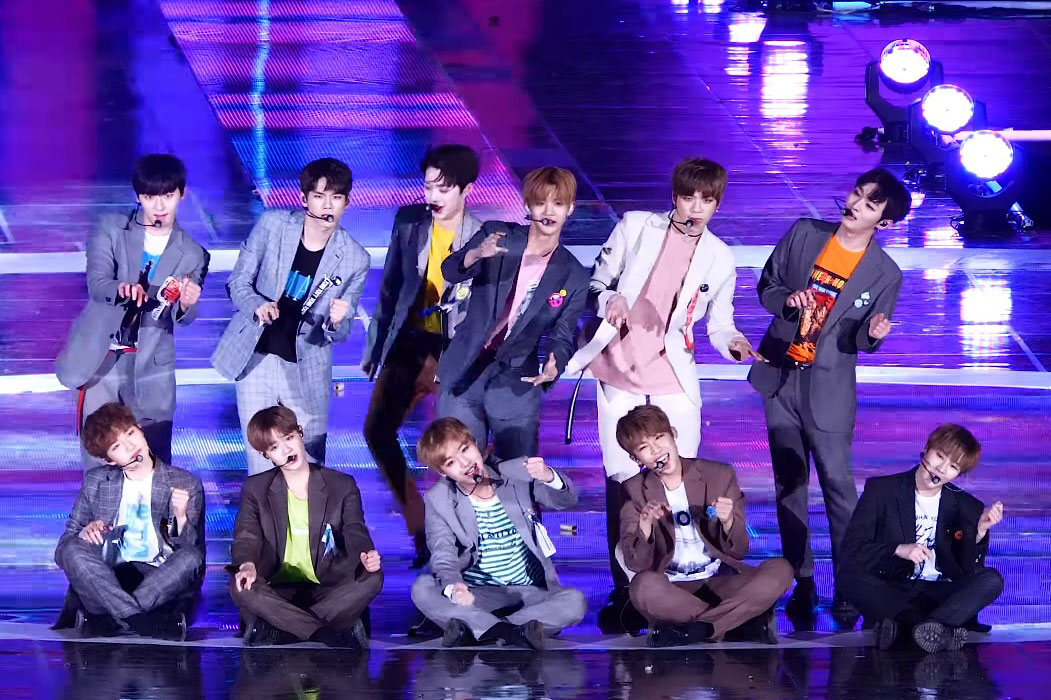
- Wanna One performing at the 2017 Dream Concert.
Awards and nominations
Award	Wins	Nominations
Asia Artist Awards	5	7
Gaon Chart Music Awards	5	12
Golden Disc Awards	4	9
Korean Popular Music Awards	4	6
MBC Plus X Genie Music Awards	3	9
Melon Music Awards	6	10
Mnet Asian Music Awards	7	20
MTV Europe Music Awards	0	1
Seoul Music Awards	4	9
Soribada Best K-Music Awards	4	7
Other awards	7	9

Totals (Note: Certain award groups do not simply award one winner. They acknowledge several different recipients, have runners-up, and have third place. Since this is a specific recognition and is different from losing an award, runner-up mentions are considered wins in this award tally. For simplification and to avoid errors, each award in this list has been presumed to have had a prior nomination.)
- Wins: 49
- Nominations: 99

This is a list of awards and nominations received by Wanna One, a South Korean boy band formed by CJ E&M through the 2017 series Produce 101 Season 2, under YMC Entertainment and CJ E&M. Wanna One has received a total of 49 awards.

== Awards and nominations ==
Name of the award ceremony, year presented, category, nominee(s) of the award, and the result of the nomination
Award ceremony	Year	Category	Nominee(s)/work(s)	Result	Ref.
Asia Artist Awards	2017	Rookie Award	Wanna One	Won	
Asia Artist Awards	2017	Super Rookie Samsung Pay Award	Wanna One	Won	
Asia Artist Awards	2017	Popularity Award	Wanna One	Nominated	
Asia Artist Awards	2018	Popularity Award	Wanna One	Nominated	
Asia Artist Awards	2018	Artist of the Year – Music	Wanna One	Won	
Asia Artist Awards	2018	Asia Hot Artist – Music	Wanna One	Won	
Asia Artist Awards	2018	Best Artist Award – Music	Wanna One	Won	
Gaon Chart Music Awards	2018	Album of the Year – 3rd Quarter	1X1=1 (To Be One)	Nominated	
Gaon Chart Music Awards	2018	Album of the Year – 4th Quarter	1-1=0 (Nothing Without You)	Won	
Gaon Chart Music Awards	2018	Song of the Year – August	"Energetic"	Nominated	
Gaon Chart Music Awards	2018	Song of the Year – August	"Burn It Up"	Nominated	
Gaon Chart Music Awards	2018	Song of the Year – November	"Beautiful"	Won	
Gaon Chart Music Awards	2018	New Artist of the Year (Album)	1X1=1 (To Be One)	Won	
Gaon Chart Music Awards	2018	New Artist of the Year (Song)	"Energetic"	Nominated	
Gaon Chart Music Awards	2018	Popularity Award	Wanna One	Won	
Gaon Chart Music Awards	2019	Album of the Year – 1st Quarter	0+1=1 (I Promise You)	Won	
Gaon Chart Music Awards	2019	Album of the Year – 2nd Quarter	1÷x=1 (Undivided)	Nominated	
Gaon Chart Music Awards	2019	Song of the Year – June	"Light"	Nominated	
Gaon Chart Music Awards	2019	Album of the Year – 4th Quarter	1¹¹=1 (Power of Destiny)	Nominated	
Golden Disc Awards	2018	Digital Bonsang	"Energetic"	Nominated	
Golden Disc Awards	2018	New Artist of the Year	Wanna One	Won	
Golden Disc Awards	2018	Global Popularity Award	Wanna One	Nominated	
Golden Disc Awards	2019	Popularity Award	Wanna One	Nominated	
Golden Disc Awards	2019	NetEase Most Popular K-pop Star	Wanna One	Nominated	
Golden Disc Awards	2019	Best Male Group	Wanna One	Won	
Golden Disc Awards	2019	Cosmopolitan Artist Award	Wanna One	Won	
Golden Disc Awards	2019	Disc Bonsang	0+1=1 (I Promise You)	Won	
Golden Disc Awards	2019	Disc Daesang	0+1=1 (I Promise You)	Nominated	
Korea Popular Music Awards	2018	Artist of the Year Daesang	Wanna One	Won	
Korea Popular Music Awards	2018	Popularity Award	Wanna One	Won	
Korea Popular Music Awards	2018	Olleh TV Best Artist Award	Wanna One	Won	
Korea Popular Music Awards	2018	Bonsang Award	Wanna One	Won	
Korea Popular Music Awards	2018	Album of the Year Daesang	1-1=0 (Nothing Without You)	Nominated	
Korea Popular Music Awards	2018	Song of the Year Daesang	"Beautiful"	Nominated	
Korean Film Actors Association Awards	2017	Top Singer	Wanna One	Won	
MBC Plus X Genie Music Awards	2018	Artist of the Year Daesang	Wanna One	Nominated	
MBC Plus X Genie Music Awards	2018	Song of the Year Daesang	"Beautiful"	Won	
MBC Plus X Genie Music Awards	2018	Song of the Year Daesang	"Boomerang"	Nominated	
MBC Plus X Genie Music Awards	2018	Digital Album of the Year Daesang	1-1=0 (Nothing Without You)	Nominated	
MBC Plus X Genie Music Awards	2018	Best Male Group	Wanna One	Nominated	
MBC Plus X Genie Music Awards	2018	Best Male Dance Performance	"Boomerang"	Nominated	
MBC Plus X Genie Music Awards	2018	Best Male Vocal Performance	"Beautiful"	Won	
MBC Plus X Genie Music Awards	2018	Genie Music Popularity Award	Wanna One	Nominated	
MBC Plus X Genie Music Awards	2018	MBC Plus Star Award	Wanna One	Won	
Melon Music Awards	2017	Best New Artist	Wanna One	Won	
Melon Music Awards	2017	Top 10 Artists Bonsang	Wanna One	Won	
Melon Music Awards	2017	Netizen Popularity Award	Wanna One	Nominated	
Melon Music Awards	2017	Kakao Hot Star Award	Wanna One	Won	
Melon Music Awards	2018	Top 10 Artists Bonsang	Wanna One	Won	
Melon Music Awards	2018	Record of the Year Daesang	Wanna One	Won	
Melon Music Awards	2018	Artist of the Year Daesang	Wanna One	Nominated	
Melon Music Awards	2018	Album of the Year Daesang	0+1=1 (I Promise You)	Nominated	
Melon Music Awards	2018	Best Male Dance	"Boomerang"	Won	
Melon Music Awards	2018	Netizen Popularity Award	Wanna One	Nominated	
Mnet Asian Music Awards	2017	Best of Next	Wanna One	Won	
Mnet Asian Music Awards	2017	Best New Male Artist	Wanna One	Won	
Mnet Asian Music Awards	2017	Best Male Group	Wanna One	Won	
Mnet Asian Music Awards	2017	Artist of the Year	Wanna One	Nominated	
Mnet Asian Music Awards	2017	Album of the Year	1X1=1 (To Be One)	Nominated	
Mnet Asian Music Awards	2017	Best Music Video	"Energetic"	Nominated	
Mnet Asian Music Awards	2017	Mwave Global Fans' Choice	"Energetic"	Nominated	
Mnet Asian Music Awards	2018	Artist of the Year	Wanna One	Nominated	
Mnet Asian Music Awards	2018	Best Male Group	Wanna One	Won	
Mnet Asian Music Awards	2018	Worldwide Icon of the Year	Wanna One	Nominated	
Mnet Asian Music Awards	2018	Song of the Year	"Boomerang"	Longlisted	
Mnet Asian Music Awards	2018	Best Dance Performance – Male Group	"Boomerang"	Nominated	
Mnet Asian Music Awards	2018	Best Music Video	"Beautiful"	Nominated	
Mnet Asian Music Awards	2018	Favorite Music Video	"Beautiful"	Nominated	
Mnet Asian Music Awards	2018	Mwave Global Fans' Choice	"Beautiful"	Nominated	
Mnet Asian Music Awards	2018	DDP Best Trend	Wanna One	Won	
Mnet Asian Music Awards	2018	Worldwide Fan's Choice Top 10	Wanna One	Won	
Mnet Asian Music Awards	2018	Favorite Dance Artist (Male)	Wanna One	Nominated	
Mnet Asian Music Awards	2018	Best Unit	Triple Position	Won	
Mnet Asian Music Awards	2018	Album of the Year	0+1=1 (I Promise You)	Nominated	
MTV Europe Music Awards	2017	Best Korean Act	Wanna One	Nominated	
Seoul Music Awards	2018	Bonsang Award	Wanna One	Won	
Seoul Music Awards	2018	New Artist Award	Wanna One	Won	
Seoul Music Awards	2018	Popularity Award	Wanna One	Nominated	
Seoul Music Awards	2018	Hallyu Special Award	Wanna One	Nominated	
Seoul Music Awards	2019	Bonsang Award	Wanna One	Won	
Seoul Music Awards	2019	Popularity Award	Wanna One	Nominated	
Seoul Music Awards	2019	Fandom School Award	Wanna One	Won	
Seoul Music Awards	2019	Hallyu Special Award	Wanna One	Nominated	
Seoul Music Awards	2019	Daesang Award	Wanna One	Nominated	
Soribada Best K-Music Awards	2017	Bonsang Award	Wanna One	Nominated	
Soribada Best K-Music Awards	2017	New Artist of the Year	Wanna One	Won	
Soribada Best K-Music Awards	2017	Rising Hot Star Award	Wanna One	Won	
Soribada Best K-Music Awards	2017	Popularity Award	Wanna One	Nominated	
Soribada Best K-Music Awards	2018	Bonsang Award	Wanna One	Won	
Soribada Best K-Music Awards	2018	Popularity Award (Male)	Wanna One	Won	
Soribada Best K-Music Awards	2018	Global Fandom Award	Wanna One	Nominated	
V Live Awards	2018	Global Rookie Top 5	Wanna One	Won	
V Live Awards	2019	Artist Top 10	Wanna One	Nominated	
V Live Awards	2019	Best Channel – 1 million followers	Wanna One	Nominated	

== Other awards ==
Name of the award ceremony, year presented, award category, nominated work and the result of the nomination
Award	Year	Category	Nominated work	Result	Ref.
Consumer Rights Day Awards	2018	Best Singer of the Year Selected by Music Consumers	Wanna One	Won	
EDaily Culture Awards	2018	Top Excellence Award – Concert	Wanna One Premier Show-Con (To Be One)	Won	
Korea Entertainment Producers Association Awards	2018	Artist of the Year	Wanna One	Won	
National Brand Awards	2018	National Brand Grand Prize	Wanna One	Won	

== Listicles ==
Name of publisher, year listed, name of listicle, and placement
Publisher	Year	Listicle	Placement	Ref.
Billboard	2017	10 Best New K-Pop Acts in 2017	1st	
Billboard	2017	Tumblr's Most Popular K-Pop Acts of 2017	13th	
Forbes	2018	Korea Power Celebrity 40	2nd	
Forbes	2019	Korea Power Celebrity 40	3rd	
Gallup Korea	2017	Top 10 Artists	6th	
Ilgan Sports	2017	30 Power People of 2017	2nd	
International Business Times	2017	2017 Best K-Pop Brand	2nd	
International Business Times	2017	2017 Best K-Pop Artist	1st	

== Boy Group Brand Reputation Rankings ==
Boy Group Brand Reputation Rankings by the Korean Business Research Institute
Year	Month	Placement	Ref.
2017	September	1st	
2017	October	2nd	
2017	November	1st	
2017	December	1st	
2018	January	2nd	
2018	February	2nd	
2018	March	1st	
2018	April	1st	
2018	May	1st	
2018	June	2nd	
2018	July	2nd	
2018	August	2nd	
2018	September	2nd	
2018	October	2nd	
2018	November	2nd	
2018	December	2nd	
2019	January	2nd	
2022	January	4th	
2022	February	5th	
2022	March	13th	
2022	April	14th	
2022	May	20th	
2022	June	20th	
2022	July	18th	
2022	August	24th	
2022	September	21st	
2022	October	16th	
2022	November	15th	
2022	December	23rd	
2023	January	24th	
2023	February	24th	
2023	March	22nd	
2023	April	21st	
2023	May	17th	
2023	June	13th	
2023	July	22nd	
2023	August	21st	
2023	September	24th	
2023	October	24th	
2023	November	25th	
2023	December	21st	
2024	January	28th	
2024	February	23rd	
2024	March	23rd	
2024	April	24th	
2024	May	27th	
2024	June	20th	
2024	July	28th	
2024	August	23rd	

== See also ==
- List of awards and nominations received by Kang Daniel
