= List of Gaon Album Chart number ones of 2018 =

The Gaon Album Chart is a South Korean record chart that ranks the best-selling albums and EPs in South Korea. It is a part of the Gaon Music Chart, which was launched in February 2010. The data are compiled by the Ministry of Culture, Sports and Tourism and the Korea Music Content Industry Association based upon weekly/monthly physical album sales by major South Korean distributors such as LOEN Entertainment, Genie Music, Sony Music Korea, Warner Music Korea, Universal Music and Mnet Media.

== Weekly charts ==
Week ending date	Album	Artist	Ref.
January 6	Love Yourself 承 'Her'	BTS	
January 13	Top Seed	Infinite	
January 20	True Colors	JBJ	
January 27	Poet | Artist	Jonghyun	
February 3	The Perfect Red Velvet	Red Velvet	
February 10	Director's Cut	Seventeen	
February 17	1X1=1 (To Be One)	Wanna One	
February 24	白	Yang Yo-seob	
March 3	10 Stories	Kim Sung-kyu	
March 10	Yellow Flower	Mamamoo	
March 17	Eyes on You	Got7	
March 24	0+1=1 (I Promise You)	Wanna One	
March 31	New Chapter #1: The Chance of Love	TVXQ	
April 7	Everyday	Winner	
April 14	Blooming Days	Exo-CBX	
April 21	Eau de VIXX	VIXX	
April 28	Be Myself	Hwang Chi-yeul	
May 5	Time for the Moon Night	GFriend	
May 12	Seoul Night	Teen Top	
May 19	Love Yourself 轉 'Tear'	BTS	
May 26	Love Yourself 轉 'Tear'	BTS	
June 2	The Story of Light EP.1	Shinee	
June 9	1÷x=1 (Undivided)	Wanna One	
June 16	The Story of Light EP.2	Shinee	
June 23	Square Up	Blackpink	
June 30	Who, You	NU'EST W	
July 7	One & Six	Apink	
July 14	Summer Nights	Twice	
July 21	You Make My Day	Seventeen	
July 28	The Great Seungri	Seungri	
August 4	You Make My Day	Seventeen	
August 11	Summer Magic	Red Velvet	
August 18	'Bout You	Super Junior-D&E	
August 25	Love Yourself 結 'Answer'	BTS	
September 1	Love Yourself 結 'Answer'	BTS	
September 8	We Go Up	NCT Dream	
September 15	The Story of Light: Epilogue	Shinee	
September 22	Present: You	Got7	
September 29	Present: You	Got7	
October 6	New Kids: The Final	iKon	
October 13	Regular-Irregular	NCT 127	
October 20	Regular-Irregular	NCT 127	
October 27	Take.1 Are You There?	Monsta X	
November 3	Don't Mess Up My Tempo	Exo	
November 10	Yes or Yes	Twice	
November 17	Hour Moment	BtoB	
November 24	1¹¹=1 (Power of Destiny)	Wanna One	
December 1	Wake, N	NU'EST W	
December 8	Present: You & Me	Got7	
December 15	Love Shot	Exo	
December 22	Poet | Artist	Jonghyun	
December 29	Don't Mess Up My Tempo	Exo	

== Monthly charts ==
Month	Album	Artist	Sales	Ref.
January	Poet | Artist	Jonghyun	151,224	
February	Director's Cut	Seventeen	176,291	
March	0+1=1 (I Promise You)	Wanna One	829,275	
April	Blooming Days	Exo-CBX	352,575	
May	Love Yourself 轉 'Tear'	BTS	1,664,041	
June	1÷x=1 (Undivided)	Wanna One	639,955	
July	You Make My Day	Seventeen	351,928	
August	Love Yourself 結 'Answer'	BTS	1,933,450	
September	Present: You	Got7	301,916	
October	Regular-Irregular	NCT 127	273,075	
November	Don't Mess Up My Tempo	Exo	1,195,334	
December	Love Shot	Exo	499,849	
