= List of Music Bank Chart winners (2018) =

Music Bank Chart winners (2018)

Highlights
- Songs with most wins: "Boomerang" by Wanna One, "Fake Love" & "Idol" by BTS (3)
- Artist(s) with most wins: BTS, Exo & Wanna One (6)
- Song with highest score: "Fake Love" by BTS (15,019)

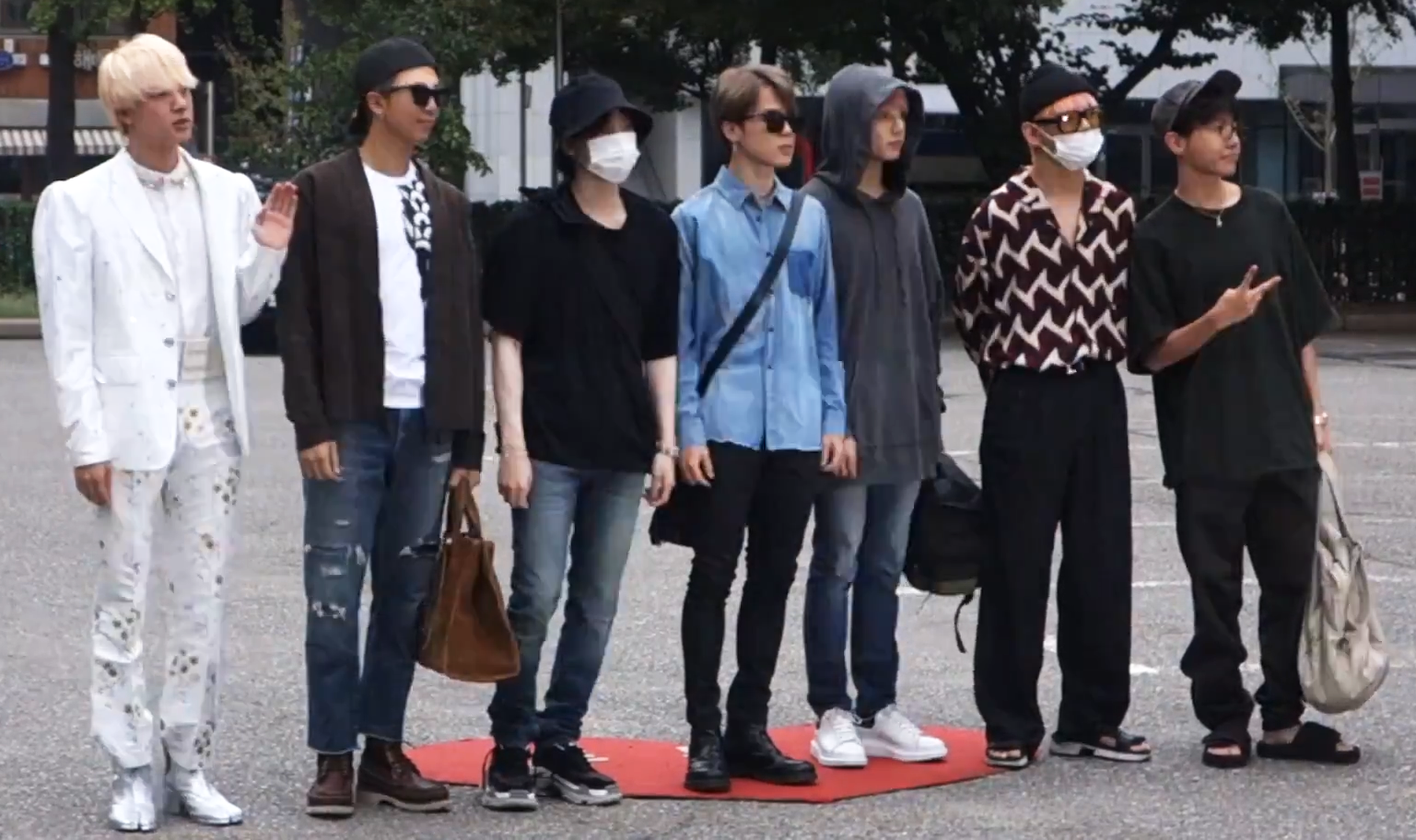
BTS's (pictured) "Fake Love" won the highest score of 2018, with 15,019 points on the June 1 broadcast.

The Music Bank Chart is a record chart established in 1998 on the South Korean KBS television music program Music Bank. Every week during its live broadcast, the show gives an award for the best-performing single on the South Korean chart. The chart includes digital performance on domestic online music services (65%), album sales (5%), number of times the single was broadcast on KBS TV (20%), and viewers' choice (10%) in its ranking methodology. The score for domestic online music services is calculated using data from Melon, Bugs, Genie Music and Soribada. Laboum member Ahn Sol-bin hosted the show from July 2016 until June 8, 2018. Actor Lee Seo-won, who had been hosting the show alongside Solbin since November 2016 continued to do so till May 11, 2018, when he was removed from his role as a host after it was revealed that he was being investigated for sexual assault and intimidation. For the next four weeks after his departure, VIXX member N, Highlight member Son Dong-woon, Shinee member Taemin and BTS member Jin each appeared on one show as a guest host alongside Solbin. On June 15, Lovelyz member Kei and actor Choi Won-myeong became the new hosts of the show.

In 2018, 36 singles achieved a number one on the chart and 25 music acts were awarded first-place trophies. Of all releases for the year BTS's "Fake Love" acquired the highest point total on the June 1 broadcast with a score of 15,019. The single along with their succeeding single "Idol" and Wanna One's "Boomerang" spent a total of 3 weeks atop the chart each, the most of any act in 2018. Three acts had three number one singles on the chart in 2018: Exo with "Universe", "Tempo" and "Love Shot", Got7 with "Look", "Lullaby" and "Miracle", and Wanna One with "Boomerang", "Light" and "Spring Breeze". Boy group iKon had two number one singles on the chart in 2018. Their hit single "Love Scenario" ranked number one on the chart on the March 2 broadcast. The song would go on to rank number one on major music streaming services and achieve a perfect all-kill. They went on to achieve another number one single on October 12 with "Goodbye Road".

A number of acts achieved their first number ones on Music Bank in 2018. Boy group JBJ won their first music program trophy with "My Flower" on the January 26 broadcast. Infinite member Kim Sung-kyu won for the first time on Music Bank with "True Love" after it debuted at number one on the March 9 broadcast. Soloist Sunmi achieved her first number one on the chart with "Siren" on the September 21 broadcast. Boy groups NCT 127 and Monsta X received their first ever number one on Music Bank with "Regular" and "Shoot Out" respectively. Two girl groups gained their first number one on the chart in 2018: Momoland with "Bboom Bboom" and Blackpink with "Ddu-Du Ddu-Du" on the February 23 and June 29 broadcast respectively.

== Chart history ==
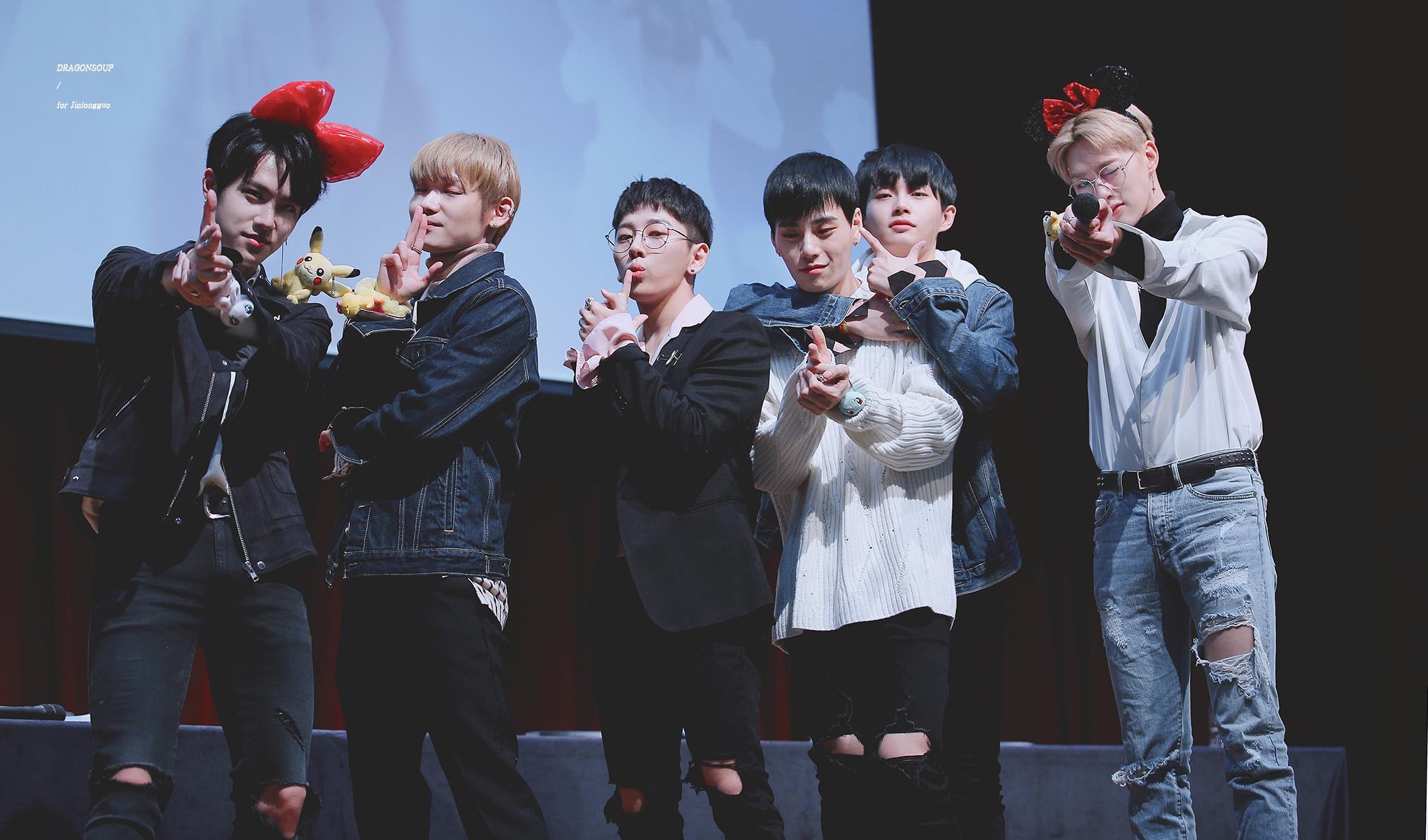
JBJ (pictured) won on the January 26 broadcast for "My Flower", which served as the group's first and only music show trophy.

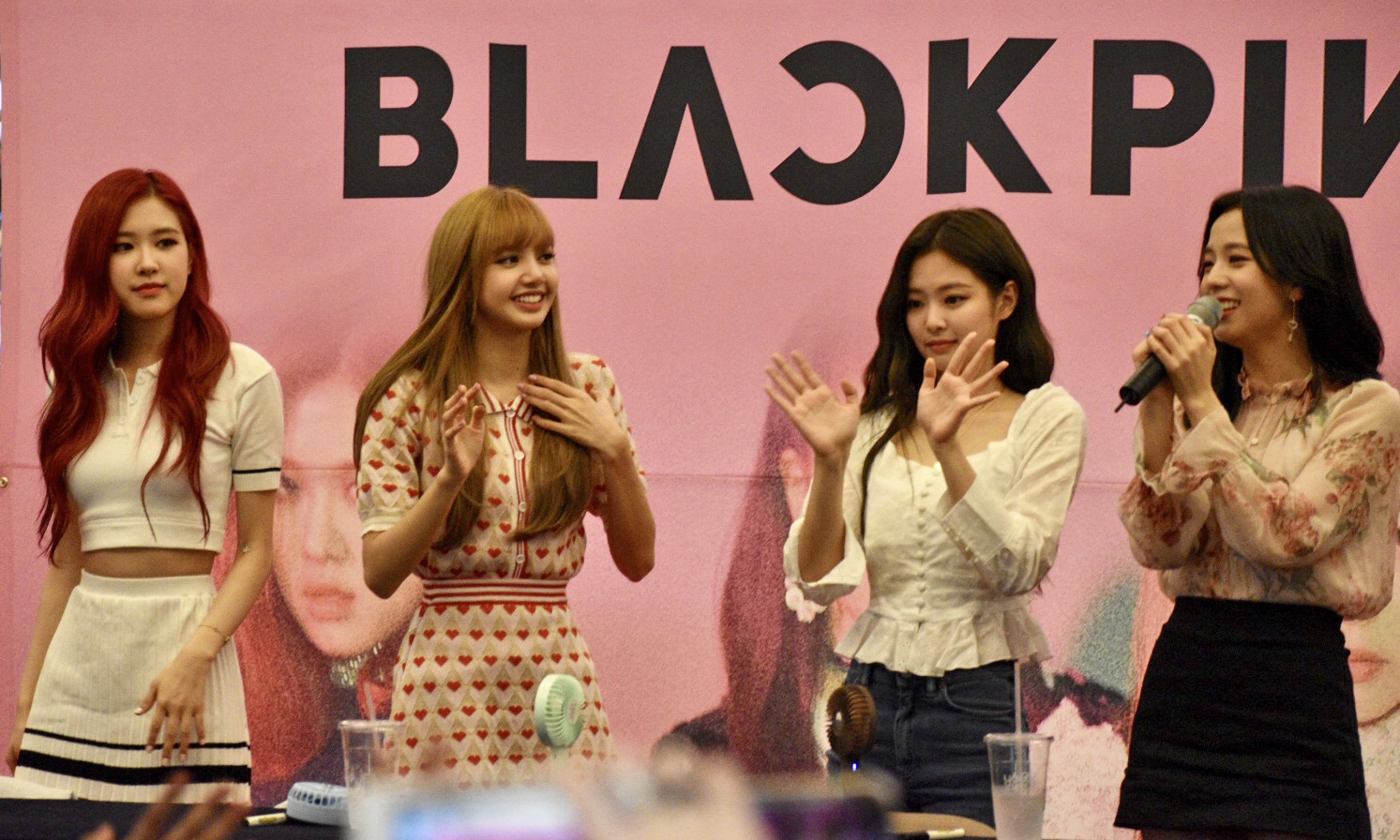
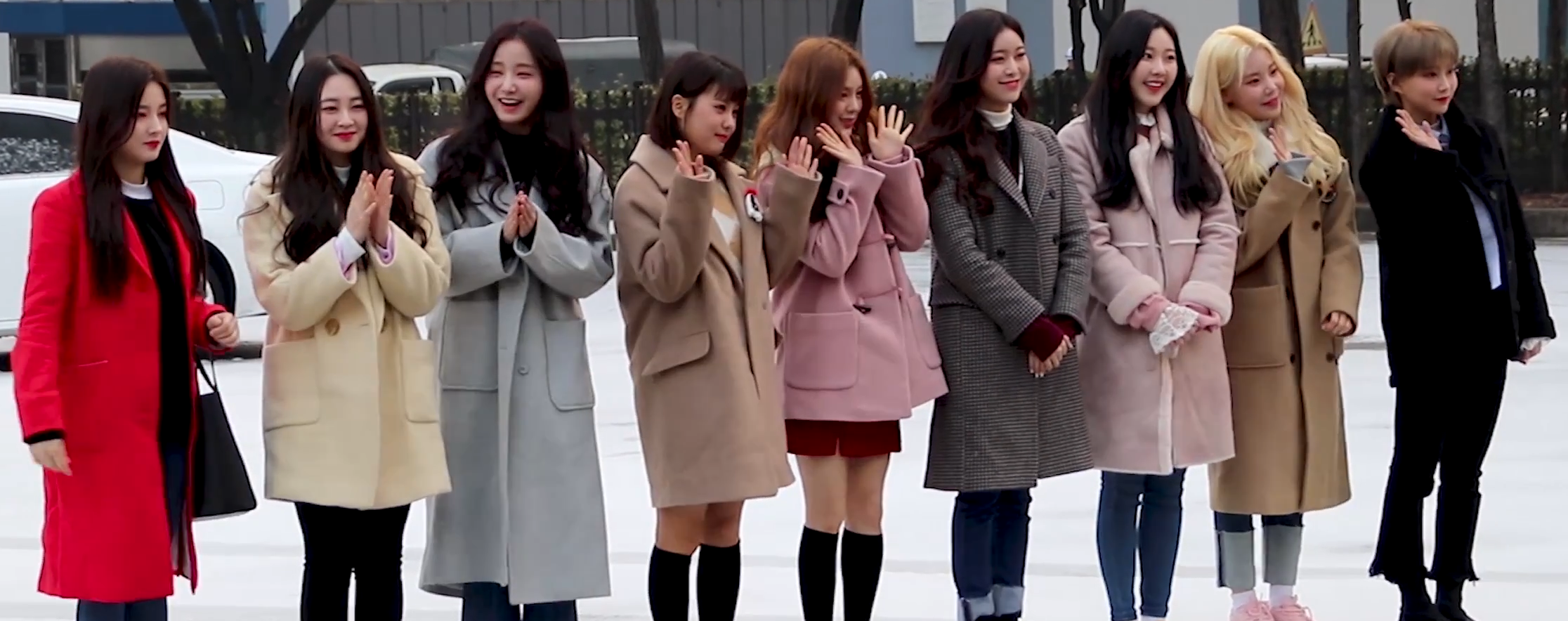
Blackpink (top) and Momoland (bottom) won their first Music Bank trophy with "Ddu-Du Ddu-Du" and "Bboom Bboom", respectively.
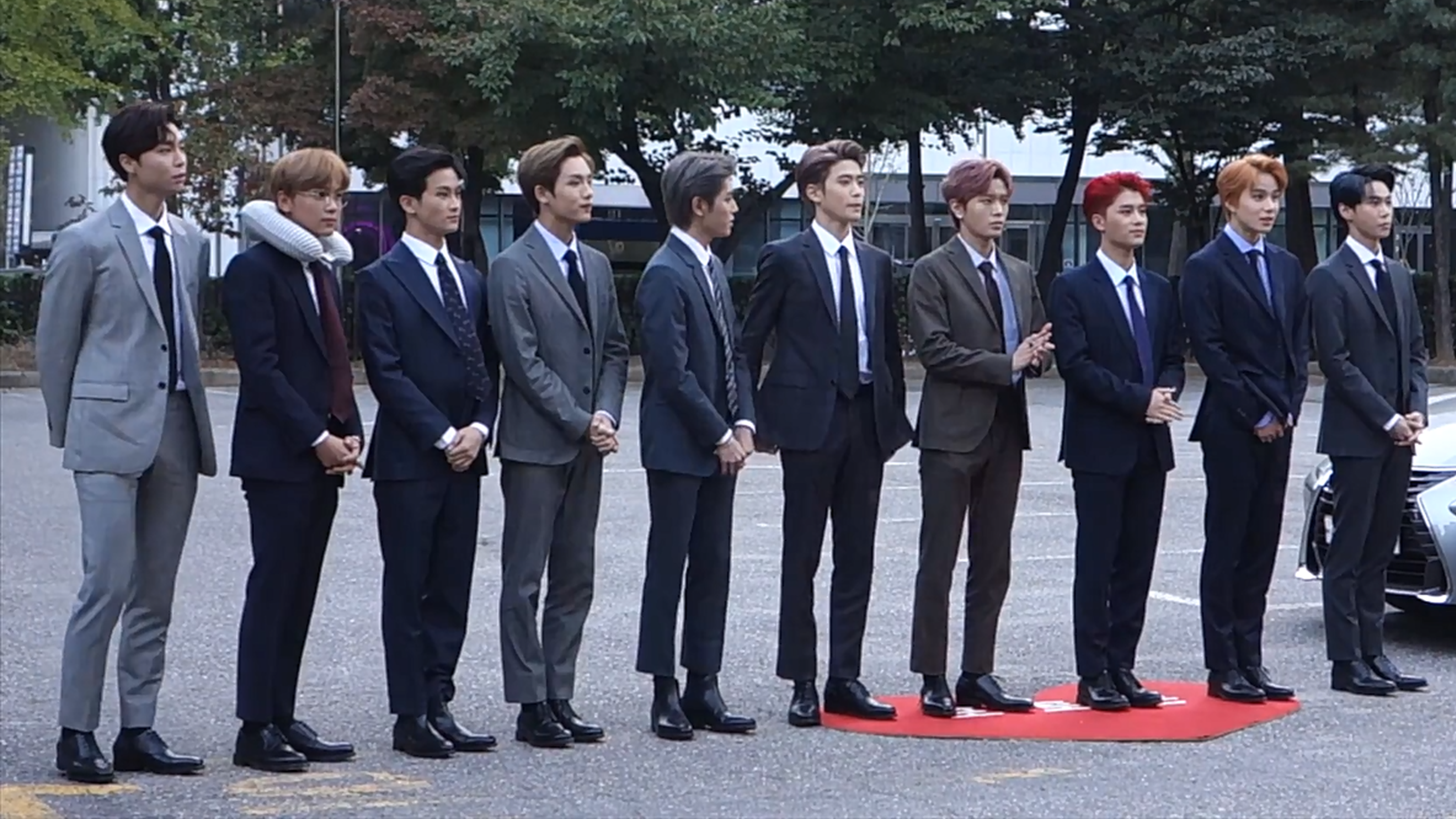
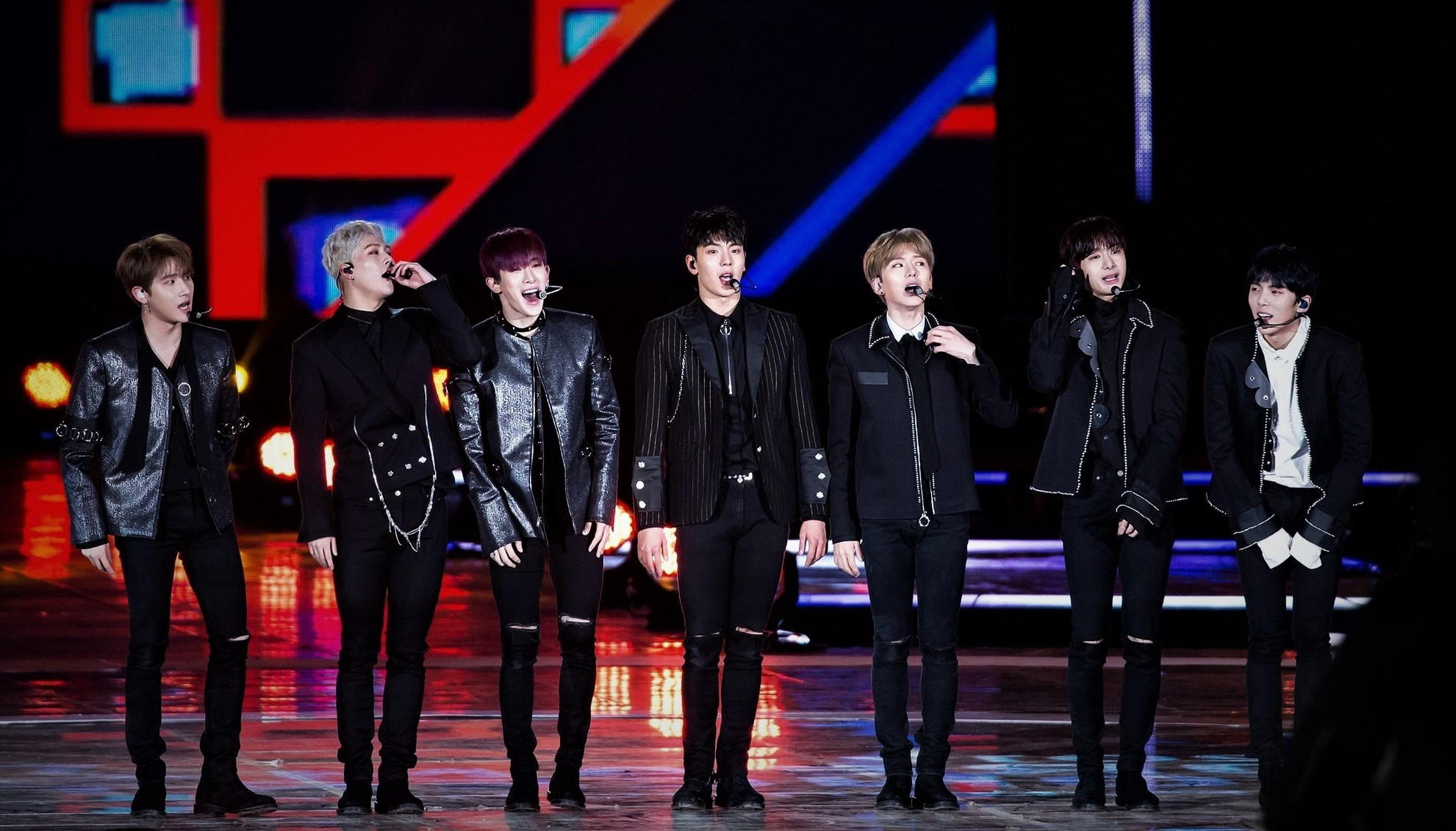
NCT 127 (top) and Monsta X (bottom) received their first broadcast music show wins on Music Bank for "Regular" and "Shoot Out", respectively.
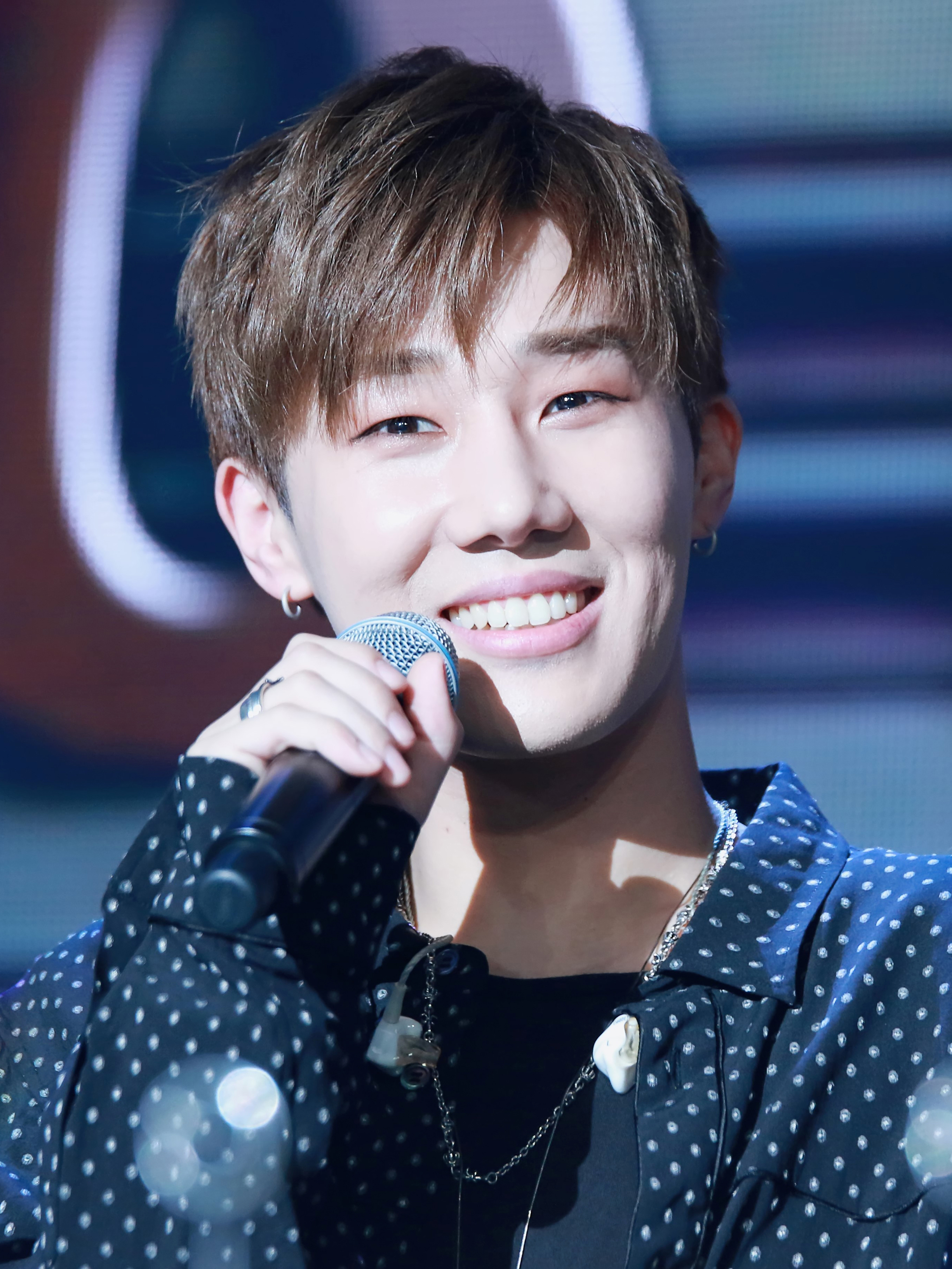
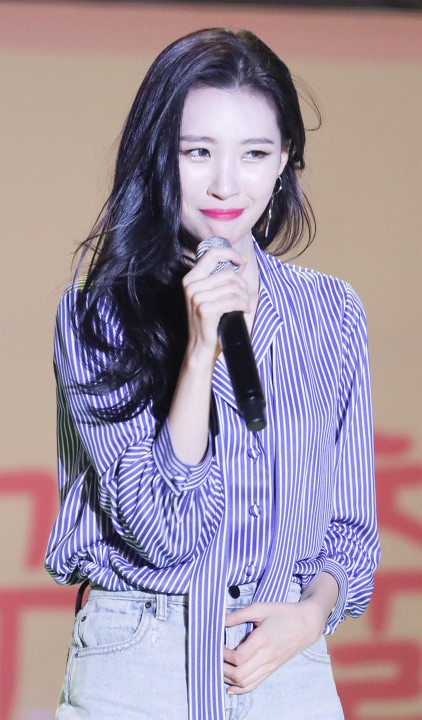
Kim Sung-kyu of Infinite (left) and Sunmi (right) won Music Bank for the first time with "True Love" and "Siren", respectively.

Key
| ‡ | Highest score in 2018 |
| — | No show was broadcast |

Chart history
| Episode | Date | Artist | Song | Points | Ref. |
|---|---|---|---|---|---|
| 913 | January 5 | Exo | "Universe" | 10,371 | |
| 914 | January 12 | Exo | "Universe" | 6,324 | |
| 915 | January 19 | Infinite | "Tell Me" | 5,393 | |
| 916 | January 26 | JBJ | "My Flower" | 5,531 | |
| 917 | February 2 | Jonghyun | "Shinin'" | 5,560 | |
| — (Note: This week's winners were announced on the station's official website.) | February 9 | Red Velvet | "Bad Boy" | 5,962 | |
| — | February 16 | Seventeen | "Thanks" | 7,540 | |
| 918 | February 23 | Momoland | "Bboom Bboom" | 7,633 | |
| 919 | March 2 | iKon | "Love Scenario" | 6,056 | |
| 920 | March 9 | Kim Sung-kyu | "True Love" | 5,831 | |
| — | March 16 | Mamamoo | "Starry Night" | 6,015 | |
| 921 | March 23 | Got7 | "Look" | 9,927 | |
| 922 | March 30 | Wanna One | "Boomerang" | 10,298 | |
| 923 | April 6 | Wanna One | "Boomerang" | 7,103 | |
| 924 | April 13 | Wanna One | "Boomerang" | 6,151 | |
| 925 | April 20 | Twice | "What Is Love?" | 9,335 | |
| 926 | April 27 | Twice | "What Is Love?" | 8,367 | |
| 927 | May 4 | Hwang Chi-yeul | "Star, You (The Only Star)" | 6,552 | |
| 928 | May 11 | GFriend | "Time for the Moon Night" | 8,690 | |
| 929 | May 18 | GFriend | "Time for the Moon Night" | 6,154 | |
| 930 | May 25 | BTS | "Fake Love" | 10,493 | |
| 931 | June 1 | BTS | "Fake Love" | 15,019 ‡ | |
| 932 | June 8 | BTS | "Fake Love" | 10,647 | |
| 933 | June 15 | Wanna One | "Light" | 11,260 | |
| 934 | June 22 | Wanna One | "Light" | 7,528 | |
| 935 | June 29 | Blackpink | "Ddu-Du Ddu-Du" | 10,095 | |
| 936 | July 6 | NU'EST W | "Dejavu" | 10,151 | |
| 937 | July 13 | Apink | "I'm So Sick" | 5,930 | |
| 938 | July 20 | Twice | "Dance the Night Away" | 11,347 | |
| 939 | July 27 | Seventeen | "Oh My!" | 11,345 | |
| 940 | August 3 | Twice | "Dance the Night Away" | 5,338 | |
| 941 | August 10 | Shaun | "Way Back Home" | 4,729 | |
| 942 | August 17 | Red Velvet | "Power Up" | 8,882 | |
| 943 | August 24 | Red Velvet | "Power Up" | 6,536 | |
| 944 | August 31 | BTS | "Idol" | 9,567 | |
| 945 | September 7 | BTS | "Idol" | 11,949 | |
| 946 | September 14 | BTS | "Idol" | 5,275 | |
| 947 | September 21 | Sunmi | "Siren" | 5,433 | |
| 948 | September 28 | Got7 | "Lullaby" | 9,751 | |
| 949 | October 5 | Got7 | "Lullaby" | 5,323 | |
| 950 | October 12 | iKon | "Goodbye Road" | 5,239 | |
| 951 | October 19 | IU | "Bbibbi" | 4,338 | |
| 952 | October 26 | NCT 127 | "Regular" | 6,585 | |
| 953 | November 2 | Monsta X | "Shoot Out" | 7,067 | |
| 954 | November 9 | Exo | "Tempo" | 8,561 | |
| 955 | November 16 | Exo | "Tempo" | 9,417 | |
| 956 | November 23 | BtoB | "Beautiful Pain" | 6,680 | |
| 957 | November 30 | Wanna One | "Spring Breeze" | 11,509 | |
| 958 | December 7 | NU'EST W | "Help Me" | 6,686 | |
| 959 | December 14 | Got7 | "Miracle" | 4,679 | |
| 960 | December 21 | Exo | "Love Shot" | 7,267 | |
| — | December 28 | Exo | "Love Shot" | 7,742 | |
