= One: The World =

2018 concert tour by Wanna One

- World tour by Wanna One
- Associated album: 1X1=1 (To Be One); 1-1=0 (Nothing Without You); 0+1=1 (I Promise You); 1÷x=1 (Undivided)
- Start date: June 1, 2018
- End date: September 1, 2018
- Legs: 1
- No. of shows: 20

One: The World is the only concert tour headlined by South Korean boy band Wanna One, a project group created through the 2017 Mnet survival show, Produce 101 to promote their second extended play, 0+1=1 (I Promise You) and their special album, 1÷x=1 (Undivided). The tour began on June 1, 2018 in South Korea and concluded on September 1, 2018 in the Philippines. They visited 14 countries including Singapore, Malaysia, Thailand, Indonesia, Hong Kong, Taiwan, Japan, Australia and the United States.

== Background ==
On April 3, Wanna One released a poster on their social media accounts announcing the world tour and the cities that will be included in the tour. CJ E&M announced the dates of the tour on April 6.

The first day of the three day concert of Wanna One in Seoul features a different set list due to the filming of Wanna One's reality show, Wanna One Go: X-Con. It is also where the group showcased and performed the songs off their new album, 1÷x=1 (Undivided).

== Set list ==
Seoul, South Korea (June 1, 2018)

Opening VCR

- Burn It Up

Ment

- Forever and A Day (Lean On Me Unit)
- Kangaroo (Triple Position Unit)

Ment
VCR #2
VCR #3

- 11 (No. 1 Unit) (feat. Dynamic Duo)
- Sandglass (The Heal Unit) (feat. Heize)

Ment
VCR #4
VCR #5
VCR #6

- Light

Ment

- Never
- Energetic

VCR #7

- Boomerang

Ment

- Day by Day
- Beautiful

VCR #8

- I'll Remember
- Wanna
- Always

Ment
VCR #9

- Dance Break
- Wanna Be
- Twilight

Ment

- Gold
- Pick Me (It's Me)

Ment

- I Promise You
Seoul, South Korea (June 2–3, 2018)

Opening VCR

- Burn It Up
- Never
- Energetic
- Minhyun Solo Performance

VCR #2

- Woojin and Jihoon Performance
- Boomerang

Ment

- Day by Day
- Beautiful
- Daniel Solo Performance

VCR #3

- Forever and A Day (Lean On Me Unit)
- Jinyoung Solo Performance
- 11 (No. 1 Unit)

VCR #4

- Jaehwan Solo Performance
- I'll Remember
- Wanna
- Always

Ment

- Seongwu and Daehwi Performance
- Sandglass (The Heal Unit)
- Kangaroo (Triple Position Unit)

VCR #5

- Jisung DJ
- Sungwoon Solo Performance
- Guanlin Solo Performance
- Wanna Be
- Twilight
- Pick Me (It's Me)

Ment

- Gold
- Light

Ment

- I Promise You

Includes filming of Wanna One Go: X-Con

== Tour dates ==
Date	City	Country/Region	Venue	Attendance
Asia
June 1, 2018	Seoul	South Korea	Gocheok Sky Dome	60,000
June 2, 2018	Seoul	South Korea	Gocheok Sky Dome	60,000
June 3, 2018	Seoul	South Korea	Gocheok Sky Dome	60,000
North America
June 21, 2018	San Jose	United States	Event Center Arena	—
June 26, 2018	Dallas	United States	Verizon Theatre at Grand Prairie	—
June 29, 2018	Rosemont	United States	Rosemont Theatre	—
July 2, 2018	Atlanta	United States	Cobb Energy Performing Arts Centre	—
Asia
July 10, 2018	Chiba	Japan	Makuhari Messe	38,000
July 11, 2018	Chiba	Japan	Makuhari Messe	38,000
July 13, 2018	Singapore		Singapore Indoor Stadium	—
July 15, 2018	Jakarta	Indonesia	Indonesia Convention Exhibition	—
July 21, 2018	Kuala Lumpur	Malaysia	Axiata Arena	8,000
July 28, 2018	Hong Kong	China	AsiaWorld–Arena	—
July 29, 2018	Hong Kong	China	AsiaWorld–Arena	—
August 4, 2018	Bangkok	Thailand	Impact Arena	—
August 5, 2018	Bangkok	Thailand	Impact Arena	—
Oceania
August 17, 2018	Melbourne	Australia	Hisense Arena	—
Asia
August 25, 2018	Taoyuan	Taiwan	NTSU Arena	—
August 26, 2018	Taoyuan	Taiwan	NTSU Arena	—
September 1, 2018	Pasay	Philippines	Mall of Asia Arena	—
