= Eyes on You (EP) =

EP by Got7
- Released: March 12, 2018
- Genre: K-pop
- Length: 20:20
- Language: Korean
- Labels: JYP; IRIVER

Got7 chronology
| 7 for 7 (2017) | Eyes on You (2018) | Present: You (2018) |

Singles from Eyes on You
- 1. "One and Only You" Released: February 28, 2018; 2. "Look" Released: March 12, 2018

Eyes on You is the eighth extended play by South Korean boy band Got7. It was released by JYP Entertainment and iriver Inc on March 12, 2018. It contains seven songs, including the singles "One and Only You" and "Look".

== Background and composition ==
Got7's new album was announced on February 3, 2018, at a fan meeting marking the group's fourth anniversary. The EP was preceded by the release of the R&B, hip hop, and EDM single "One and Only You" featuring Hyolyn on February 28, 2018.

Eyes on You consists of six songs composed by the group and contains a message to a precious existence; JB composed the lead track for the second time, specifically "Look," a pop-based house track in which several arrangement changes highlight the seven singers' voices. It talks about not caring about other people's words, expressing your love as much as you want, and being honest with your feelings. In an interview published before the release, the members stated that it was a song with which they were able to truly show themselves as musicians.

"The Reason" is pop and dance; "Hesitate" talks about worrying that your feelings are not reciprocated and has a guitar melody, while "Us" expresses the frustration of a relationship in which only one person gives and the determination to reach the other at any cost. The lyrics are a request for acceptance and love in order to truly become an "us". The song is R&B and pop, and recalls the sounds of Latin music; it was written by Yugyeom as an extension of "To Me" from 7 for 7. "Thank You" was written and composed by Jinyoung to thank fans and console those who are sorry for not being able to give more to their loved one, even though they have already given everything; in the song, fans are compared to a "green milky way". In terms of genre, it is based on the songs of bands.

== Critical reception ==
Idology named "One and Only You" as one of Got7's catchiest songs. In its review of the album, it noted how the group's performance, and JB's as a composer and lyricist, had improved, commenting that the tracks after "Look" quietly supported the album. It stated that Got7 had never sounded happier and that Eyes on You was "an album with a clear pop feel that exceeds expectations time after time," concluding, "the refreshing 'Look' sweeps you off your feet, gradually accustoming you to Got7's style. [...] Finally, an EP where you can focus on Got7."

"One and Only You" was selected among the 20 best pop singles released by an idol group in 2018 by Y Magazine, which found it worthy of representing the group and better than "Look."

On the other hand, Hong Dam-young of The Korea Herald deemed the album "decent, but not fresh" and that it lacked "a powerful punch or a penetrating flow", concluding "Eyes on You does a good job of portraying Got7 as a pleasant gift to fans, but musically, doesn't add to its old framework".

== Track listing ==
| No. | Title | Lyrics | Music | Arrangement | Length |
|---|---|---|---|---|---|
| 1. | "One and Only You" (featuring Hyolyn) | Defsoul (JB) | Shim Eunji, Albin Nordqvist, Louise Frick Sveen, Fredrik "Figge" Boström | Albin Nordqvist | 3:20 |
| 2. | "Look" | Defsoul (JB), Mirror Boy, D.ham, Moon Hanmiru | Defsoul (JB), Mirror Boy, D.ham, Moon Hanmiru | Mirror Boy, D.ham, Moon Hanmiru, Lee Sang-chul | 3:14 |
| 3. | "The Reason" | BamBam, Lee Ha-jin | BamBam, Images | BamBam, Images | 3:39 |
| 4. | "Hesitate" (망설이다) | Amillo, Ars (Youngjae) | 5S, Amillo, Ars (Youngjae) | 5S, Honggom, Ryan Im | 3:05 |
| 5. | "Us" (우리) | Samuel Ku, Yugyeom | EFFN, Yugyeom | Heth, EFFN | 3:16 |
| 6. | "Thank You" (고마워) | Jinyoung | Stephen Langstaff, Charlie Tenku, Matthew Weedon, Distract, Jinyoung | Charlie Tenku | 3:46 |
| Total length: | | | | | 20:20 |

Physical edition track
| No. | Title | Music | Arrangement | Length |
|---|---|---|---|---|
| 7. | "Look" (Instrumental) | Defsoul (JB), Mirror Boy, D.ham | Mirror Boy, D.ham, Moon Hanmiru | 3:14 |
| Total length: | | | | 23:34 |

== Charts ==
Weekly chart performance for Eyes on You
| Chart (2018) | Peak position |
|---|---|
| French Download Albums (SNEP) | 62 |
| Japan Hot Albums (Billboard) | 80 |
| NZ Heatseeker Albums (RMNZ) | 4 |
| South Korean Albums (Gaon) | 1 |
| United Kingdom Download (OCC) | 43 |
| US World Albums (Billboard) | 2 |
| US Heatseekers Albums (Billboard) | 2 |

Monthly chart performance for Eyes on You
| Chart (2018) | Peak position |
|---|---|
| South Korean Albums (Gaon) | 2 |

Yearly chart performance for Eyes on You
| Chart (2018) | Peak position |
|---|---|
| South Korean Albums (Gaon) | 12 |

== Certifications ==
| Region | Certification | Certified units/sales |
|---|---|---|
| South Korea (KMCA) | Platinum | 250,000^{^} |
^{^} Shipments figures based on certification alone.

== Release history ==
| Country | Date | Format | Label | Ref. |
|---|---|---|---|---|
| South Korea | March 12, 2018 | CD; digital download | JYP Entertainment; IRIVER | |
| Worldwide | March 12, 2018 | Digital download | JYP Entertainment; IRIVER | |

== See also ==
- List of Gaon Album Chart number ones of 2018
- List of K-pop songs on the Billboard charts
- List of K-pop albums on the Billboard charts
