= Never (Produce 101 song) =

Song

Song by Produce 101, Wanna One

from the album 35 Boys 5 Concepts, 1X1=1 (To Be One)
- Released: June 3, 2017
- Genre: Deep house
- Length: 3:09
- Label: YMC Entertainment; Stone Music Entertainment; CJ E&M Music; Pony Canyon
- Songwriters: Hui; E'Dawn; Wooseok
- Producers: Hui; Flow Blow

"Never" is a song by contestants of Produce 101 Season 2. It was re-released by Wanna One, the winning group of Produce 101 Season 2 on their album 1X1=1 (To Be One).

== Background and release ==
Produce 101 Season 2 was a South Korean survival show that aired on Mnet from April to June in 2017 where 101 male trainees from various entertainment companies competed to debut in an 11-member boy group which would promote until December 2018.

On the 8th and 9th episode, the 35 remaining trainees were split into five teams and given five new songs from different producers, with different genres. They were tasked to perform these songs live in front of total audience of 2000. "Never" eventually came second during the show's on-site voting, and received praise for its exceptional stage performance. It was sung by the following 7 contestants: Hwang Min-hyun, Kim Jong-hyun, Kim Jae-hwan, Ong Seong-wu, Park Woo-jin, Lee Dae-hwi and Lai Kuan-lin (collectively known as Nation's Son); all of them except Kim Jong-hyun eventually went on to debut in the winning group Wanna One.

== Composition ==
"Never" is a deep house song produced by Pentagon members and Flow Blow.

== Commercial performance ==
On June 3, 2017, "Never" by Nation's Sons achieved an all-kill on Instiz, charting at #1 on real-time charts of Melon, Mnet, Bugs, Soribada, and Naver.

== Critical reception ==
"Never" was chosen as one of the 20 Best K-pop Songs of 2017 by Billboard, with Tamar Herman commenting that the song was "one of the best sonic moments of K-pop in 2017" with its "layered vocals, powerful raps, and propulsive drops flowing into a blend of subtle, melodious instrumental elements and frenzied synths."

== Track listing ==
No.	Title	Lyrics	Music	Arrangement	Length
1.	"Never" (Nation's Sons (국민의 아들))	Hui, E'Dawn, Wooseok PENTAGON	Hui, Flow Blow (Jung Guk-yong, Yang Ha-yi)	Flow Blow	3:21

== Sales ==
Region	Sales
South Korea	874,890

== Charts ==
=== Weekly charts ===
Chart (2017)	Peak position
South Korean Gaon Digital Chart	2

=== Monthly charts ===
Chart (2017)	Peak position
South Korea (Gaon Digital Chart)	3
