= The Show (South Korean TV program) =

South Korean television program

- Genre: Music
- Presented by: Minjae (Xikers); Chuei Liyu (Flare U)
- Country of origin: South Korea
- Original language: Korean
- No. of episodes: 395

Production
- Production location: SBS Prism Tower
- Production company: SBS Medianet

Original release
- Network: SBS M; SBS funE; SBS Life
- Release: April 15, 2011 – present

The Show (Korean: 더 쇼; previously The Show: All New K-Pop (season 2), The Show: All About K-Pop (season 3)) is a South Korean music television program broadcast by SBS FunE. It airs live every Tuesday and is broadcast from the SBS Prism Tower in Sangam-dong, Seoul, South Korea.

Since January 2019, The Show is broadcast live to over 20 countries through Paramount Network, MTV France and on TBS in Japan. On October 24, 2025, SBS funE announced that The Show would officially be ending its 14-year run on November 11.

On May 13, 2026, it was announced that The Show would be returning on June 2, 2026 and would be broadcast on SBS Life and on TikTok.

== Chart system ==
The Show's chart system was introduced at the beginning of its fourth season which started on October 28, 2014 and was named The Show Choice. This chart tracking from Saturday to Friday.

The three nominees were chosen from the starring singers every week and the winner of The Show Choice is determined based on the following criteria:

Period covered	Chart system					
Period covered	Broadcast	Digital sales	Physical album	Professional judges	Video views	Voting and netizen ranking
2014 – 2017	N/A	40%	10%	15%	20%	15% (live-voting only)
2018 – 2020	N/A	40%	10%	15%	20%	15% (5% pre-voting + 10% live-voting)
January 26, 2021 – February 23, 2021	15%	40%	10%	N/A	20%	15% (live-voting only)
March 2, 2021 – present	15%	40%	10%	N/A	20%	15% (5% pre-voting + 10% live-voting)

Based source and explanations for each criterion:

- Broadcast: Number of times that a songs played on SBS MTV
- Digital sales: Number of streaming and download based on Gaon digital chart.
- Physical album: Number of copies based on Hanteo album chart
- Professional judges or critics' choice: Score based on judgement by SBS MTV's staff
- Video views or SNS: YouTube views, counted from official MV only.
- Voting and netizen ranking: Voting and netizen choices happens before show start. Currently via Star Planet app (previously branded as Starpass). Previously method includes Starplay (for pre-vote and live-vote, used until the end of 2020) and text message (use from 2014 to 2017 and January 26, 2021 – February 23, 2021).

== Hosts ==
=== Season 1 ===
- Luna, Hyoseong (April 15 – September 30, 2011)
- Himchan, Hyeri (October 7 – December 16, 2011)

=== Season 2 ===
- Lee Min-hyuk, Yook Sung-jae (March 23 – October 19, 2012)
- Zico, P.O (October 26 – December 21, 2012)

=== Season 3 ===
- Gyuri, Seungyeon (October 8, 2013 – May 27, 2014)
- Jiyeon, Hyeri, Jung Wook (June 3 – October 21, 2014)

=== Season 4 ===
- Hyeri (October 28, 2014 – January 20, 2015)
- Hongbin (March 3, 2015 – October 13, 2015)
- Jiyeon, Zhou Mi (October 28, 2014 – December 8, 2015)

=== Season 5 ===
- Zhou Mi (January 26, 2016 – August 2, 2016)
- Yerin (January 26, 2016 – September 6, 2016)
- Somi, Wooshin (October 11, 2016 – April 25, 2017)
- P.O, Jeonghwa, Yeonwoo (May 16, 2017 – August 29, 2017)
- Youngjae, JooE, Hohyeon (October 17, 2017 – May 8, 2018)

=== Season 6 ===
- Yeeun, Jeno, Jin Longguo (May 22, 2018 – October 23, 2018)
- Yeeun, Jeno (October 30, 2018 – November 26, 2019)
- Tag, Dayoung, Bae Jin-young (December 3, 2019)
- Juyeon, Sihyeon, Kim Min-kyu (February 11, 2020 – February 2, 2021)
- Yeosang, Kim Yo-han, Jihan (March 2, 2021 – December 14, 2021)
- Yeosang, Kang Min-hee, Kim Chae-hyun (January 25, 2022 – March 14, 2023)
- Yeosang, Xiaojun, Hyeongseop, Jeon Woong (Note: Host only for the On the Way Out! segment) (March 28, 2023 – March 5, 2024)
- Xiaojun, Hyeongjun, Nana, Jeon Woong (March 19, 2024 – December 3, 2024)
- Xiaojun, Hyeongjun, Jeong Sae-bi (March 4, 2025 – November 11, 2025)

=== Season 7 ===
- Chuei Liyu and Minjae (June 2, 2026 – present)

== The Show Choice winners ==
=== 2014 ===
The Show Choice winners

Key
	Triple Crown
	Highest score in 2014
—	No show was held

Episode	Date	Artist	Song	Points
1	October 28	VIXX	"Error"	9,850
2	November 4	VIXX	"Error"	8,059
3	November 11	Boyfriend	"Witch"	7,669
4	November 18	Zhou Mi	"Rewind"	8,114
5	November 25	Hyolyn and Jooyoung	"Erase"	7,415
6	December 2	Apink	"Luv"	7,237
7	December 9	Apink	"Luv"	8,257
8	December 16	Apink	"Luv"	8,498
9	December 23	No broadcast or winner		
10	December 30	No broadcast or winner		

=== 2015 ===
The Show Choice winners

Key
	Triple Crown
	Highest score in 2015
—	No show was held

Episode	Date	Artist	Song	Points
11	January 13	EXID	"Up & Down"	8,165
12	January 20	Jonghyun	"Déjà-Boo"	8,604
13	January 27	Jonghyun	"Déjà-Boo"	7,388
14	February 3	Infinite H	"Pretty"	7,572
15	February 10	Infinite H	"Pretty"	8,382
16	February 17	U-KISS	"Playground"	China Choice
17	February 24	Lunar New Year		
18	March 3	VIXX	"Love Equation"	8,250
19	March 10	VIXX	"Love Equation"	8,254
20	March 17	VIXX	"Love Equation"	7,941
21	March 24	Boyfriend	"Bounce"	8,084
22	March 31	Red Velvet	"Ice Cream Cake"	7,138
23	April 7	F.T. Island	"Pray"	7,832
24	April 14	F.T. Island	"Pray"	7,728
25	April 21	EXID	"Ah Yeah"	7,117
26	April 28	Exo	"Call Me Baby"	8,227
27	May 5	BTS	"I Need U"	8,078
28	May 12	BTS	"I Need U"	8,442
29	May 19	Kim Sung-kyu	"The Answer"	8,413
—	May 26	Uniq	"EOEO"	China Choice
30	June 2	Kara	"Cupid"	8,274
31	June 9	Shinee	"View"	7,861
32	June 16	Exo	"Love Me Right"	8,317
33	June 23	2PM	"My House"	8,516
34	June 30	Teen Top	"Ah-Ah"	7,218
35	July 7	AOA	"Heart Attack"	7,416
36	July 14	Girls' Generation	"Party"	8,286
37	July 21	Infinite	"Bad"	8,648
38	July 28	Infinite	"Bad"	8,657
39	August 4	Summer K-Pop Festival		
40	August 11	Summer K-Pop Festival		
41	August 18	Summer K-Pop Festival		
42	August 25	Girls' Generation	"Lion Heart"	7,295
43	September 1	VIXX LR	"Beautiful Liar"	9,464
—	September 8	No Chart		
44	September 15	Red Velvet	"Dumb Dumb"	7,498
45	September 22	CNBLUE	"Cinderella"	8,607
46	September 29	CNBLUE	"Cinderella"	8,545
47	October 6	Got7	"If You Do"	8,981
48	October 13	Got7	"If You Do"	8,598
49	October 20	Got7	"If You Do"	9,241
50	October 27	Kim Dong-wan	"I'm Fine"	7,402
51	November 3	2015 Asia Dream Concert		
52	November 10	f(x)	"4 Walls"	8,910
53	November 17	VIXX	"Chained Up"	8,914
54	November 24	Lee Hong-gi	"Insensible"	7,310
55	December 1	B.A.P	"Young, Wild & Free"	7,447
56	December 8	BTS	"Run"	8,951

=== 2016 ===
The Show Choice winners

Key
	Triple Crown
	Highest score in 2016
—	No show was held

Episode	Date	Artist	Song	Points
57	January 26	Teen Top	"Warning Sign"	8,473
58	February 2	GFriend	"Rough"	8,044
—	February 9	Lunar New Year		
59	February 16	GFriend	"Rough"	7,653
60	February 23	SS301	"Pain"	7,062
61	March 1	Taemin	"Press Your Number"	8,397
62	March 8	B.A.P	"Feel So Good"	7,876
63	March 15	Mamamoo	"You're The Best"	7,642
64	March 22	Red Velvet	"One of These Nights"	7,823
65	March 29	Got7	"Fly"	9,025
66	April 5	Got7	"Fly"	9,108
67	April 12	CNBLUE	"You're So Fine"	7,690
68	April 19	CNBLUE	"You're So Fine"	8,385
69	April 26	VIXX	"Dynamite"	8,841
70	May 3	VIXX	"Dynamite"	8,208
71	May 10	VIXX	"Dynamite"	8,220
72	May 17	Tiffany	"I Just Wanna Dance"	7,898
73	May 24	AOA	"Good Luck"	8,192
74	May 31	Jonghyun	"She Is"	8,644
—	June 7	No broadcast or winner		
75	June 14	EXID	"L.I.E."	8,924
76	June 21	Exo	"Monster"	9,440
77	June 28	Sistar	"I Like That"	7,044
78	July 5	EXID	"L.I.E."	8,410
79	July 12	Wonder Girls	"Why So Lonely"	7,673
80	July 19	GFriend	"Navillera"	8,404
81	July 26	F.T. Island	"Take Me Now"	7,970
82	August 2	GFriend	"Navillera"	8,039
83	August 9	GFriend	"Navillera"	8,034
84	August 16	I.O.I	"Whatta Man"	9,012
85	August 23	VIXX	"Fantasy"	9,144
86	August 30	I.O.I	"Whatta Man"	7,241
87	September 6	VIXX	"Fantasy"	9,159
88	September 13	Red Velvet	"Russian Roulette"	8,352
89	September 20	Red Velvet	"Russian Roulette"	8,449
—	September 27	No broadcast or winner		
—	October 4	No broadcast or winner		
90	October 11	Shinee	"1 of 1"	8,282
91	October 18	Got7	"Hard Carry"	8,714
92	October 25	BTS	"Blood Sweat & Tears"	8,936
93	November 1	Twice	"TT"	8,680
94	November 8	VIXX	"The Closer"	8,861
95	November 15	Exo-CBX	"Hey Mama!"	7,936
96	November 22	B.A.P	"Skydive"	8,072
97	November 29	Mamamoo	"Décalcomanie"	7,523
98	December 6	B1A4	"A Lie"	7,732
—	December 13	Seventeen	"Boom Boom"	8,005
—	December 20	No broadcast or winner		
—	December 27	No broadcast or winner		

=== 2017 ===
The Show Choice winners

Key
	Triple Crown
	Highest score in 2017
—	No show was held

Episode	Date	Artist	Song	Points
—	January 3	No Broadcast or Winner		
—	January 10	No Broadcast or Winner		
—	January 17	No Broadcast or Winner		
—	January 24	No Broadcast or Winner		
—	January 31	No Broadcast or Winner		
99	February 7	Red Velvet	"Rookie"	9,121
100	February 14	NCT Dream	"My First and Last"	8,291
101	February 21	NCT Dream	"My First and Last"	8,248
102	February 28	NCT Dream	"My First and Last"	9,162
103	March 7	Twice	"Knock Knock"	8,445
104	March 14	GFriend	"Fingertip"	8,235
105	March 21	Got7	"Never Ever"	8,663
106	March 28	Highlight	"Plz Don't Be Sad"	8,536
107	April 4	Girl's Day	"I'll Be Yours"	7,902
108	April 11	GFriend	"Fingertip"	7,858
109	April 18	Jung Eun-ji	"The Spring"	8,245
110	April 25	EXID	"Night Rather Than Day"	9,372
111	May 2	EXID	"Night Rather Than Day"	7,704
—	May 9	No Broadcast or Winner		
112	May 16	Lovelyz	"Now, We"	8,547
113	May 23	VIXX	"Shangri-La"	8,447
114	May 30	Seventeen	"Don't Wanna Cry"	8,588
—	June 6	No Broadcast or Winner		
115	June 13	Seventeen	"Don't Wanna Cry"	9,400
116	June 20	T-ara	"What's My Name?"	7,368
117	June 27	Mamamoo	"Yes I Am"	8,860
118	July 4	Apink	"Five"	8,590
119	July 11	Apink	"Five"	8,360
120	July 18	Red Velvet	"Red Flavor"	9,250
121	July 25	Exo	"Ko Ko Bop"	9,570
122	August 1	Exo	"Ko Ko Bop"	7,464
123	August 8	GFriend	"Love Whisper"	8,950
—	August 15	No Broadcast or Winner		
124	August 22	Wanna One	"Energetic"	9,400
125	August 29	Wanna One	"Energetic"	9,250
—	September 5	NCT Dream	"We Young"	8,744
—	September 12	Exo	"Power"	7,665
126	September 19	GFriend	"Summer Rain"	9,750
127	September 26	BTS	"DNA"	10,000
—	October 3	No Broadcast or Winner		
—	October 10	Episode 127 rebroadcast		
128	October 17	Bolbbalgan4	"Some"	8,614
129	October 24	Highlight	"Can Be Better"	9,292
130	October 31	No Winner		
131	November 7	No Winner		
132	November 14	Monsta X	"Dramarama"	7,400
133	November 21	EXID	"DDD"	7,388
134	November 28	Lovelyz	"Twinkle"	7,220
—	December 5	No Broadcast or Winner		
—	December 12	No Broadcast or Winner		
—	December 19	No Broadcast or Winner		
135	December 26	No Winner		

=== 2018 ===
The Show Choice winners

Key
	Triple Crown
	Highest score in 2018
—	No show was held

Episode	Date	Artist	Song	Points
—	January 2	No Broadcast or Winner		
—	January 9	No Broadcast or Winner		
—	January 16	No Broadcast or Winner		
136	January 23	Oh My Girl	"Secret Garden"	6,698
—	January 30	No Broadcast or Winner		
137	February 6	Momoland	"Bboom Bboom"	7,308
—	February 13	No Broadcast or Winner		
—	February 20	No Broadcast or Winner		
138	February 27	Yang Yo-seob	"Where I Am Gone"	6,780
139	March 6	Kim Sung-kyu	"True Love"	6,230
140	March 13	Mamamoo	"Starry Night"	9,380
141	March 20	Mamamoo	"Starry Night"	9,700
142	March 27	NCT 127	"Touch"	8,500
143	April 3	Wanna One	"Boomerang"	10,000
144	April 10	EXID	"Lady"	7,854
145	April 17	Monsta X	"Jealousy"	7,550
146	April 24	VIXX	"Scentist"	9,430
147	May 1	Lovelyz	"That Day"	9,360
148	May 8	GFriend	"Time for the Moon Night"	9,630
—	May 15	No Broadcast or Winner		
149	May 22	(G)I-dle	"Latata"	8,063
150	May 29	(G)I-dle	"Latata"	8,455
151	June 5	Shinee	"Good Evening"	9,630
152	June 12	Wanna One	"Light"	10,000
—	June 19	No Broadcast or Winner		
153	June 26	Kim Dong-han	"Sunset"	7,040
154	July 3	BtoB	"Only One For Me"	8,370
155	July 10	Apink	"I'm So Sick"	9,400
156	July 17	Apink	"I'm So Sick"	8,980
157	July 24	Mamamoo	"Egotistic"	9,500
—	July 31	No Broadcast or Winner		
158	August 7	Leo	"Touch & Sketch"	7,490
159	August 14	DIA	"Woo Woo"	7,390
160	August 21	Red Velvet	"Power Up"	8,832
—	August 28	No Broadcast or Winner		
161	September 4	(G)I-dle	"Hann (Alone)"	6,925
162	September 11	Nam Woo-hyun	"If Only You Are Fine"	8,390
163	September 18	Oh My Girl	"Remember Me"	7,479
164	September 25	Got7	"Lullaby"	9,044
165	October 2	Cosmic Girls	"Save Me, Save You"	8,790
166	October 9	Soyou	"All Night"	6,215
167	October 16	NCT 127	"Regular"	9,330
168	October 23	NCT 127	"Regular"	9,755
169	October 30	Monsta X	"Shoot Out"	9,696
—	November 6	No Broadcast or Winner		
170	November 13	Iz*One	"La Vie en Rose"	8,918
171	November 20	Iz*One	"La Vie en Rose"	8,621
172	November 27	Wanna One	"Spring Breeze"	10,000
173	December 4	Wanna One	"Spring Breeze"	8,560
—	December 11	No Broadcast or Winner		
—	December 18	No Broadcast or Winner		
—	December 25	No Broadcast or Winner		

=== 2019 ===
The Show Choice winners

Key
	Triple Crown
	Highest score in 2019
—	No show was held

Episode	Date	Artist	Song	Points
—	January 1	No Broadcast or Winner		
—	January 8	No Broadcast or Winner		
—	January 15	No Broadcast or Winner		
174	January 22	GFriend	"Sunrise"	8,617
175	January 29	Astro	"All Night"	8,170
—	February 5	No Broadcast or Winner		
176	February 12	CLC	"No"	5,470
177	February 19	CLC	"No"	8,745
178	February 26	Monsta X	"Alligator"	9,480
179	March 5	N.Flying	"Rooftop"	5,816
180	March 12	TXT	"Crown"	7,190
181	March 19	Mamamoo	"Gogobebe"	6,590
182	March 26	Momoland	"I'm So Hot"	7,981
183	April 2	Momoland	"I'm So Hot"	6,311
184	April 9	Iz*One	"Violeta"	9,646
185	April 16	Iz*One	"Violeta"	9,425
186	April 23	Super Junior-D&E	"Danger"	9,250
—	April 30	No Broadcast or Winner		
187	May 7	The Boyz	"Bloom Bloom"	7,032
188	May 14	Oh My Girl	"The Fifth Season (SSFWL)"	8,205
—	May 21	No Broadcast or Winner		
189	May 28	Kim Jae-hwan	"Begin Again"	9,376
190	June 4	AB6IX	"Breathe"	8,190
191	June 11	Cosmic Girls	"Boogie Up"	7,460
192	June 18	Cosmic Girls	"Boogie Up"	7,210
193	June 25	Ateez	"Wave"	6,207
194	July 2	(G)I-dle	"Uh-Oh"	7,505
195	July 9	GFriend	"Fever"	9,100
196	July 16	Ha Sung-woon	"Blue"	8,150
—	July 23	No Broadcast or Winner		
197	July 30	CIX	"Movie Star"	8,290
198	August 6	NCT Dream	"Boom"	9,600
199	August 13	Oh My Girl	"Bungee (Fall In Love)"	8,421
200	August 20	NCT Dream	"Boom"	8,020
201	August 27	Red Velvet	"Umpah Umpah"	7,980
202	September 3	X1	"Flash"	N/A
203	September 10	X1	"Flash"	9,500
—	September 17	No Broadcast or Winner		
204	September 24	Everglow	"Adios"	7,861
205	October 1	No Winner		
206	October 8	Jeong Se-woon	"When It Rains"	6,543
207	October 15	AB6IX	"Blind For Love"	7,810
208	October 22	AB6IX	"Blind For Love"	8,560
209	October 29	TXT	"Run Away"	6,290
210	November 5	Monsta X	"Follow"	6,480
211	November 12	Victon	"Nostalgic Night"	8,160
—	November 19	Show Special, no Winner		
212	November 26	Cosmic Girls	"As You Wish"	7,370
213	December 3	Kang Daniel	"Touchin'"	6,195
—	December 10	No Broadcast or Winner		
—	December 17	No Broadcast or Winner		
—	December 24	No Broadcast or Winner		
—	December 31	No Broadcast or Winner		

=== 2020 ===
The Show Choice winners

Key
	Triple Crown
	Highest score in 2020
—	No show was held

Episode	Date	Artist	Song	Points
—	January 7	No Broadcast or Winner		
—	January 14	No Broadcast or Winner		
—	January 21	No Broadcast or Winner		
—	January 28	No Broadcast or Winner		
—	February 4	No Broadcast or Winner		
214	February 11	GFriend	"Crossroads"	7,201
215	February 18	GFriend	"Crossroads"	6,680
216	February 25	Iz*One	"Fiesta"	8,820
217	March 3	Iz*One	"Fiesta"	9,393
—	March 10	No Broadcast or Winner		
218	March 17	Victon	"Howling"	6,870
219	March 24	Sejeong	"Plant"	5,827
220	March 31	Kang Daniel	"2U"	8,290
—	April 7	No Broadcast or Winner		
—	April 14	No Broadcast or Winner		
221	April 21	Apink	"Dumhdurum"	7,810
222	April 28	Solar	"Spit it Out"	9,100
223	May 5	Oh My Girl	"Nonstop"	8,631
224	May 12	Oh My Girl	"Nonstop"	6,806
—	May 19	No Broadcast or Winner		
225	May 26	TXT	"Can't You See Me?"	8,880
226	June 2	Monsta X	"Fantasia"	8,690
227	June 9	Victon	"Mayday"	8,120
228	June 16	Cosmic Girls	"Butterfly"	8,100
229	June 23	Iz*One	"Secret Story of the Swan"	9,030
230	June 30	Iz*One	"Secret Story of the Swan"	7,657
231	July 7	AB6IX	"The Answer"	8,976
232	July 14	SF9	"Summer Breeze"	8,830
233	July 21	GFriend	"Apple"	9,180
—	July 28	No Broadcast or Winner		
234	August 4	Ateez	"Inception"	5,870
235	August 11	Kang Daniel	"Who U Are"	7,135
—	August 18	No Broadcast or Winner		
—	August 25	No Broadcast or Winner		
236	September 1	Cravity	"Flame"	6,070
237	September 8	Lovelyz	"Obliviate"	8,638
238	September 15	YooA	"Bon Voyage"	6,689
239	September 22	Moonbin & Sanha	"Bad Idea"	6,450
—	September 29	No Broadcast or Winner		
240	October 6	The Boyz	"The Stealer"	8,370
241	October 13	Golden Child	"Pump It Up"	8,680
242	October 20	Pentagon	"Daisy"	8,470
—	October 27	No Broadcast or Winner		
243	November 3	TXT	"Blue Hour"	8,370
244	November 10	Monsta X	"Love Killa"	7,410
245	November 17	GFriend	"Mago"	9,185
246	November 24	BtoB 4U	"Show Your Love"	7,040
—	December 1	No Broadcast or Winner		
247	December 8	NCT U	"90's Love"	8,070
248	December 15	Iz*One	"Panorama"	8,559
—	December 22	No Broadcast or Winner		
—	December 29	No Broadcast or Winner		

=== 2021 – present ===
- 2021
- 2022
- 2023
- 2024
- 2025
- 2026

== Achievements by artists ==
=== List of most The Show Choice wins ===
Rank	Artist	Wins
1st	GFriend	16
2nd	VIXX	14
3rd	Oh My Girl	10
4th	Apink	9
4th	Red Velvet	9
4th	Monsta X	9
4th	Iz*One	9
8th	EXID	8
8th	Got7	8
8th	(G)I-dle	8
8th	Ateez	8
12th	Mamamoo	7
12th	STAYC	7
14th	Exo	6
14th	WJSN	6
14th	Wanna One	6
14th	TXT	6
14th	Ive	6
14th	Highlight	6
14th	Zerobaseone	6

=== List of top 10 highest scores ===
Top 10 highest scores (October 28, 2014 – present)

Rank	Artist	Song	Score	Date
1st	BTS	"DNA"	10,000	September 26, 2017
1st	Wanna One	"Boomerang"	10,000	April 3, 2018
1st	Wanna One	"Light"	10,000	June 12, 2018
1st	Wanna One	"Spring Breeze"	10,000	November 27, 2018
5th	VIXX	"Error"	9,850	October 28, 2014
6th	GFriend	"Summer Rain"	9,750	September 19, 2017
7th	Mamamoo	"Starry Night"	9,700	March 20, 2018
7th	Apink	"Dilemma"	9,700	February 22, 2022
9th	Le Sserafim	"Fearless"	9,670	May 17, 2022
10th	Iz*One	"Violeta"	9,646	April 9, 2019

=== List of Triple Crowns ===
Artist	Song	Wins
2014
Apink	"Luv"	December 2, December 9, December 16
2015
VIXX	Love Equation"	March 3, March 10, March 17
Got7	"If You Do"	October 6, October 13, October 20
2016
VIXX	"Dynamite"	April 26, May 3, May 10
GFriend	"Navillera"	July 19, August 2, August 9
2017
NCT Dream	"My First and Last"	February 14, February 21, February 28

== Similar programs ==
- Mnet M Countdown
- SBS Inkigayo
- KBS Music Bank
- MBC Show! Music Core
- Arirang TV Pops in Seoul
- Arirang TV Simply K-Pop (formerly called The M-Wave and Wave K)
- Arirang TV Show K-Pop
- JTBC Music on Top
- JTBC Music Universe K-909
- MBC M Show Champion

== See also ==
- Music programs of South Korea
