= Energetic (Wanna One song) =

2017 single by Wanna One

Single by Wanna One

from the album 1X1=1 (To Be One)
- Released: August 7, 2017
- Genre: Dance-pop; K-pop
- Length: 3:09
- Label: YMC Entertainment; Stone Music Entertainment; CJ E&M Music; Pony Canyon
- Songwriters: Hui; Wooseok
- Producers: Hui; Flow Blow

Wanna One singles chronology
"Energetic" (2017)	"Burn It Up" (2017)

Music video
- "Energetic" on YouTube

"Energetic" is the first single by South Korean boy band Wanna One. It serves as the lead single of their first extended play, 1X1=1 (To Be One).

== Background and release ==
On the group's reality show Wanna One Go, previews of two songs on the group's debut mini album was shared, "Burn It Up" and "Energetic". Fans were asked to vote on which song they'd like to see the group select as their debut title track. At the end of August 3 episode of Wanna One Go, the result of vote was released and the group's debut title track was announced to be "Energetic".

== Composition ==
"Energetic" was composed by production team Flow Blow with Pentagon's Hui and Wooseok, who also produced "Never", one of the songs included in Produce 101 Season 2 Top 35 concept challenge evaluation; and won 2nd-place position during the show's on-site voting. Musically, "Energetic" is a dance-pop track with a hint of ballad. It begins with a mellow piano melody which transcends into an electropop chorus.

== Music video ==
The song's accompanying music video is directed by Zanybros, who has directed many Kpop music videos of popular acts such as Mamamoo, AOA and GFriend. The video features the members having fun and playing around in a variety of vibrantly hued scenes, while also showcasing their sharp choreography.

On February 3, 2019 at 4:45 p.m. KST, the music video reached 100 million views, making it the first Wanna One music video to obtain 100 million views as well as the first debut music video from a K-pop boy group to achieve this feat.

== Critical reception ==
Billboard complimented the song for living up to its title as an invigorating dance track, describing it as a song which "bounces between rhythms with ease" and containing "tempo shifts which seamlessly energize the momentum of the song". It was chosen as the Best K-pop song of 2017 by Billboard critics, with Jeff Benjamin saying that the song is a pristinely produced, dynamic electro-pop gem which celebrates a key moment in the music scene's history. Korea JoongAng Daily describes the song as a "earworm" which will surely be remembered by both fans and casual listeners. It was also chosen by Dazed Digital as one of the 20 best K-Pop songs of 2017.

"Energetic" was also noted for its "human piano formation" at the beginning of its choreography, which consists of the 11 members emulating the shape of a piano while member Hwang Min-hyun pretends to play on it. SBS News said that the choreography of "Energetic" features a sensual, sophisticated mood on their performance.

== Commercial performance ==
Upon its release, "Energetic" topped six online music charts of six major music sites: Melon, Genie, Bugs, Mnet, Naver and Soribada; and achieved a real-time "all-kill" status. The song peaked at number one on Gaon Digital Chart. It is the group's first single to sell over a million copies in South Korea.

== Charts ==
=== Weekly chart ===
Chart (2017)	Peak position
South Korea (Gaon)	1
US World Digital Songs (Billboard)	6

=== Monthly chart ===
Chart (2017)	Peak position
South Korea (Gaon)	3

== Release history ==
Region	Date	Format	Label
South Korea	August 7, 2017	Digital download	YMC Entertainment, CJ E&M Music
Worldwide	August 7, 2017	Digital download	CJ E&M Music

== Sales ==
=== Downloads ===
Region	Sales
South Korea	2,500,000+

=== Streaming ===
Chart (2017–2018)	Streaming
South Korean Streaming Chart (Gaon)	100,000,000+

== Accolades ==
Awards
Year	Organization	Award	Result	Ref.
2017	2017 Mnet Asian Music Awards	Best Music Video	Nominated	
2017	2017 Mnet Asian Music Awards	Mwave Global Fans' Choice	Nominated	
2018	Golden Disc Awards	Digital Bonsang	Nominated	
2018	Gaon Chart Music Awards	Song of the Year – August	Nominated	
2018	Gaon Chart Music Awards	New Artist of the Year (Song)	Nominated	

Music program wins
Program	Date (15 total)	Ref.
The Show (SBS MTV)	August 22, 2017	
The Show (SBS MTV)	August 29, 2017	
Show Champion (MBC M)	August 16, 2017	
Show Champion (MBC M)	August 23, 2017	
Show Champion (MBC M)	August 30, 2017	
M Countdown (Mnet)	August 17, 2017	
M Countdown (Mnet)	August 24, 2017	
M Countdown (Mnet)	August 31, 2017	
Music Bank (KBS)	August 18, 2017	
Music Bank (KBS)	August 25, 2017	
Show! Music Core (MBC)	August 19, 2017	
Show! Music Core (MBC)	August 26, 2017	
Show! Music Core (MBC)	September 2, 2017	
Inkigayo (SBS)	August 20, 2017	
Inkigayo (SBS)	August 27, 2017	

Melon Popularity Award
Award	Date (2017)	Ref.
Weekly Popularity Award	September 4	
Weekly Popularity Award	September 11	
