= I Promise You (I.P.U.) =

Song by Wanna One

Single by Wanna One

from the album 0+1=1 (I Promise You)
- Released: March 5, 2018
- Genre: Electro-pop; K-pop
- Length: 3:40
- Label: YMC; CJ E&M
- Songwriters: Galactika; Robin; Athena

Wanna One singles chronology
"Beautiful" (2017)	"I Promise You (I.P.U.)" (2018)	"Boomerang" (2018)

Music video
- "I Promise You (I.P.U.)" on YouTube

"I Promise You (I.P.U.)" (Korean: 약속해요 (I.P.U.); RR: Yaksokhaeyo (I.P.U.)) is a song by South Korean boy band Wanna One. The song serves as the pre-release single of their second extended play, 0+1=1 (I Promise You). The special theme track is dedicated to fans, marking the 333rd day since the group's first public appearance.

== Charts ==
=== Weekly chart ===
Chart (2018)	Peak position
South Korea (Gaon)	5

== Awards and nominations ==
=== Music program awards ===
Program	Date
Show Champion	March 21
Show! Music Core	March 17
