= Beautiful (Wanna One song) =

Song by Wanna One

Single by Wanna One

from the album 1-1=0 (Nothing Without You)
- Released: November 13, 2017
- Genre: EDM; pop; ballad; K-pop
- Length: 3:17
- Label: YMC Entertainment; Stone Music Entertainment; CJ E&M Music; Pony Canyon
- Songwriters: Tenzo; Kebee; Wooziq
- Producer: Wooziq

Wanna One singles chronology
"Burn It Up" (2017)	"Beautiful" (2017)	"I Promise You (I.P.U.)" (2018)

Music video
- "Beautiful" on YouTube

"Beautiful" is a song by South Korean boy band Wanna One. The song serves as the lead single of their re-issue album, 1-1=0 (Nothing Without You).

== Composition ==
Musically, "Beautiful" was described as a midtempo EDM-pop ballad containing woozy synths and a steady beat. The song's lyrics expresses the feelings of fear, loneliness and longing coming from being alone.

== Music video ==
The music video is directed by Yong Yi, who has directed several South Korean films. Using the song to propel the storyline, the 8-minute long "movie" music video depicts a storyline where members Kang Daniel and Ong Seongwoo portray brothers who were separated in childhood and began searching for one another after they grew up, ultimately reuniting in an orphanage where Kang resides. Other members played supporting and minor roles in the video; Hwang Minhyun plays Ong's classmate at the police academy, Park Jihoon plays Kang's childhood friend and the rest plays Kang's friends at the orphanage. The video ends with trouble following the pair of brothers and their friends, culminating in ruin for both.

== Chart performance ==
Upon release, "Beautiful" charted atop on real-time charts of six music sites: Melon, Genie, Bugs, Mnet, Naver, and Soribada. It recorded highest number of unique listeners in the first hour on a song on Melon since chart reforms, breaking the record previously held by Wanna One's own song, "Energetic". The single peaked at number one on Gaon Digital Chart, becoming the group's second chart-topper.

== Charts ==
=== Weekly chart ===
Chart (2017)	Peak position
South Korea (Gaon)	1
South Korea (Kpop Hot 100)	1

=== Monthly chart ===
Chart (2017)	Peak position
South Korea (Gaon)	2

== Release history ==
Region	Date	Format	Label
South Korea	November 13, 2017	Digital download	YMC Entertainment, CJ E&M Music
Worldwide	November 13, 2017	Digital download	CJ E&M Music

== Sales ==
Region	Sales
South Korea	667,145+

== Accolades ==
Awards
Year	Organization	Award	Result	Ref.
2018	Gaon Chart Music Awards	Song of the Year – November	Won	
2018	MBC Plus X Genie Music Awards	Song of the Year	Won	
2018	MBC Plus X Genie Music Awards	Best Male Vocal Performance	Won	
2018	Mnet Asian Music Awards	Best Music Video	Nominated	
2018	Mnet Asian Music Awards	Mwave Global Fans' Choice	Nominated	

Music program wins
Program	Date	Ref.
Show Champion (MBC M)	November 22, 2017	
M Countdown (Mnet)	November 23, 2017	
Music Bank (KBS)	November 24, 2017	
Music Bank (KBS)	December 1, 2017	
Show! Music Core (MBC)	November 25, 2017	
Show! Music Core (MBC)	December 2, 2017	
Show! Music Core (MBC)	December 9, 2017	
Show! Music Core (MBC)	December 16, 2017	

Melon Popularity Award
Award	Date (2017)	Ref.
Weekly Popularity Award	November 27	
Weekly Popularity Award	December 4	
Weekly Popularity Award	December 11	
Weekly Popularity Award	December 18	
Weekly Popularity Award	December 25	
