= 1÷x=1 (Undivided) =

2018 album by South Korean boy group Wanna One

EP by Wanna One
- Released: June 4, 2018
- Recorded: 2018
- Genre: EDM; Hip hop; R&B; Pop rock
- Length: 19:03
- Language: Korean
- Label: Swing Entertainment; Stone Music Entertainment

Wanna One chronology
0+1=1 (I Promise You) (2018)	1÷x=1 (Undivided) (2018)	1¹¹=1 (Power of Destiny) (2018)

Singles from 1÷x=1 (Undivided)
- 1. "Light" Released: June 4, 2018

1÷x=1 (Undivided) is the third mini-album by South Korean boy band Wanna One. It was released on June 4, 2018, by Swing Entertainment and Stone Music Entertainment.

== Release and promotion ==
1÷x=1 (Undivided) is a follow-up of the band's arithmetic-themed album series. In April, Wanna One announced that the members will split into multiple units and collaborate with different artists such as Dynamic Duo, Zico, Nell and Heize for their upcoming album. On May 7, Wanna One announced the title of the new "Special" album, 1÷x=1 (Undivided) through a teaser video. It will contain the songs produced during their unit projects, which will be shown on the group's reality show Wanna One Go: X-con.

=== Units ===
The different units were unveiled on the first day of Wanna One Go: X-con.

Unit name	Producer	Members
Lean on Me	Nell	Yoon Ji-sung, Hwang Min-hyun, Ha Sung-woon
Number 1	Dynamic Duo	Park Ji-hoon, Bae Jin-young, Lai Kuan-lin
The Heal	Heize	Ong Seong-wu, Lee Dae-hwi
Triple Position	Zico	Kim Jae-hwan, Kang Daniel, Park Woo-jin

On June 4, the album was released, along with the music video of the lead single, "Light".

Wanna One filmed the live performance of "Light" and the unit songs during their Day 1 Concert in Seoul on June 1, which was broadcast live on Mnet, the channel's YouTube account and the group's Facebook account, through the group's reality show, Wanna One Go: X-con on June 4. They also promoted on music shows for two weeks.

== Production and composition ==
The title of the album is inspired by arithmetical operations like the band's previous releases: 1X1=1 (To Be One), 1-1=0 (Nothing Without You), and 0+1=1 (I Promise You). Every sub-unit track on the album is produced by a high-profile South Korean artist. The lead single, "Light" is a UK garage-inspired electropop track containing a catchy chorus and EDM breakdown. The song features all the eleven members of the band. "Forever and a Day" is an evocative pop rock track groove ballad. The song is produced by Kim Jong Wan, the vocalist of indie rock band Nell. It features the members Yoon Ji-sung, Ha Sung-woon and Hwang Min-hyun and sonically, sounds similar to the style of its writer Kim. "11" is a groovy alternative R&B track produced by Gaeko and Choiza of Dynamic Duo. The song features Lai Kuan-lin, Park Ji-hoon, and Bae Jin-young. "Sandglass" is a breezy track produced by Heize and featuring Ong Seong-wu and Lee Dae-hwi. The lyrics talk about with the theme of an hourglass that symbolizes memories that do not disappear, but are there for a limited time. "Kangaroo" is a summery hip hop track produced by Block B's Zico and contains punky rhythms and melodies. The song features members Kim Jae-hwan, Kang Daniel and Park Woo-jin.

== Track listing ==
1÷x=1 (Undivided) track listing
No.	Title	Lyrics	Music	Arrangement	Length
1.	"Light" (켜줘; Kyeojwo; lit. Turn It On)	iHwak	iHwak; Royal Dive	Royal Dive	3:29
2.	"Kangaroo" (캥거루; Triple Position)	Zico; Kang Daniel; Park Woo-jin	Zico; Poptime	Zico; Poptime	3:43
3.	"Forever and a Day" (영원+1; Lean on Me)	Kim Jong-wan	Kim Jong-wan	Nell	4:28
4.	"Hourglass" (모래시계; The Heal)	Heize; Ong Seong-wu; Lee Dae-hwi	Heize; Royal Dive	Royal Dive	3:49
5.	"11" (No.1)	Gaeko; Choiza	Gaeko; Gray; Dax; Lee Tae-yeon	Gray; Dax; Lee Tae-yeon	3:30
Total length:					19:05

== Charts ==
=== Weekly charts ===
Chart (2018)	Peak position
South Korean Albums (Gaon)	1
US World Albums (Billboard)	8

=== Year-end charts ===
Chart (2018)	Position
South Korean Albums (Gaon)	5

== Certifications ==
Region	Certification	Certified units/sales
South Korea (KMCA)	2× Platinum	500,000^{^}
^{^} Shipments figures based on certification alone.

== Awards ==
Year	Award	Category	Nominated work	Result	Ref.
2018	Mnet Asian Music Awards	Song of the Year	"Kangaroo"	Longlisted	
2018	Mnet Asian Music Awards	Best Unit	"Kangaroo" (Wanna One – Triple Position)	Won	
