= 1¹¹=1 (Power of Destiny) =

2018 studio album by Wanna One

Studio album by Wanna One
- Released: November 19, 2018
- Recorded: 2018
- Genre: Dance
- Length: 38:15
- Language: Korean
- Labels: Swing; Stone

Wanna One chronology
1÷x=1 (Undivided) (2018)	1¹¹=1 (Power of Destiny) (2018)

Singles from 1¹¹=1 (Power of Destiny)
- 1. "Spring Breeze" Released: November 19, 2018

1¹¹=1 (Power of Destiny) is the only studio album and the final release by the South Korean boy group Wanna One, released on November 19, 2018, by Swing Entertainment and Stone Music Entertainment. The album was the culmination of the group's activities before its disbandment in January 2019.

== Background and release ==
On October 30, 2018, Wanna One released a teaser video and revealed the title of its first full album, titled 1¹¹=1 (Power of Destiny). Between October 31 and November 4, concept photos were posted on the group's social media sites.

On November 5, 2018, the group revealed the lead single "Spring Breeze" and the album pre-order. From November 6 to November 11, 2018, the group released concept photos for the Adventure and Romance versions of the album.

The "Spring Breeze" music video teaser was posted on November 13. The track list was revealed on November 15. The "Spring Breeze" video was released on November 19 along with the album, with Billboard calling the song a "smooth dance track that leans into lilting synths and alt rock instrumentals while sprinkling in orchestral strings, horns and piano elements to craft a stirring melody". The Korea Times labeled the song alternative dance. The video shows the group performing "clean-cut, interpretive choreography" along with intercut scenes of the group hanging out.

The album was described as having songs about the members' feelings about the group's upcoming disbandment.

== Promotion ==
Wanna One hosted a comeback show on November 22, 2018, which was broadcast on Mnet, M2, the group's Facebook page and the YouTube channels of Mnet Official, Mnet KPOP and M2. The comeback show was pre-recorded and showed the group's performances of old and new songs as well as a discussion of the album through making "mukbangs" and paintings. The band also promoted the album on South Korean music shows including The Show, Show Champion, M Countdown, Music Bank, Show! Music Core and Inkigayo.

== Track listing ==
1¹¹=1 (Power of Destiny) track listing
No.	Title	Lyrics	Music	Arrangement	Length
1.	"Destiny (Intro)"	Galactika*	Galactika*; AthenA	Galactika*; AthenA	1:11
2.	"Spring Breeze" (봄바람)	iHwak; Flow Blow	iHwak; Flow Blow	Flow Blow	3:55
3.	"One's Place" (집)	Jung Ho-hyun (E.One)	Jung Ho-hyun (E.One)	Jung Ho-hyun (E.One)	3:50
4.	"Flowerbomb" (불꽃놀이)	Ha Sungwoon; O.R.O; Vendors	Ha Sungwoon; O.R.O; Vendors	O.R.O; Vendors	3:37
5.	"One Love" (묻고싶다)	13	13	13	3:30
6.	"Deeper"	iHwak; Royal Dive	Christian Fast; Christoffer Lauridsen; Didrik Thott; iHwak; Royal Dive	Royal Dive	3:37
7.	"Hide and Seek" (술래)	MOT	MOT	MOT	3:05
8.	"Awake!"	Jung Ho-hyun (e.one); Park Woojin	Jung Ho-hyun (e.one)	Jung Ho-hyun (e.one)	3:14
9.	"12th Star" (12번째 별; CD only)	IMAGES; Jo Eun-byul	IMAGES; Jo Eun-byul	IMAGES	3:59
10.	"Pine Tree" (소나무)	Galactika*; AthenA	Galactika*; AthenA	Galactika*; AthenA	4:00
11.	"Beautiful (Part II)"	Tenzo, Kebee	Tenzo; Wooziq	Wooziq	4:02

== Charts ==
=== Weekly charts ===
Chart (2018)	Peak position
Japanese Albums (Oricon)	3
South Korean Albums (Gaon)	1
US World Albums (Billboard)	12

=== Year-end charts ===
Chart (2018)	Position
South Korean Albums (Gaon)	6
