= Light (Wanna One song) =

Song by Wanna One

Single by Wanna One

from the album 1÷x=1 (Undivided)
- Released: June 4, 2018
- Genre: Electropop; Dance; EDM
- Length: 3:29
- Label: YMC Entertainment; CJ E&M Music
- Songwriters: iHwak; Royal Dive

Wanna One singles chronology
"Boomerang" (2018)	"Light" (2018)	"Spring Breeze" (2018)

Music video
- "Light" on YouTube

"Light" (Korean: 켜줘; lit. 'Turn It On') is a song by South Korean boy band Wanna One. The song serves as the lead single of their mini-album, 1÷x=1 (Undivided). It is described as an electro-pop dance track with an EDM breakdown.

== Background and release ==
On May 7, 2018, less than two months after the release of their previous mini-album, Wanna One released a 38-second teaser of the song onto their official YouTube channel, which was released alongside the track listing of their upcoming EP. From May 7, 2018, until the release of the song, teaser pictures and videos were consistently uploaded onto Wanna One's official twitter and YouTube accounts. The song and its accompanying music video were released on June 4, 2018. It was the only song on 1÷x=1 (Undivided) to feature vocals from every member of the group.

== Commercial reception ==
"Light" debuted at number two on the Gaon Digital Chart, on the week ending June 9, 2018. It also peaked at number nine on the month of June 2018. It is comparatively the groups least successful single to date, being the only to not chart on Billboard's K-pop Hot 100, as well as being their least viewed music video. It was also their only single to not chart in the top 100 on Gaon's yearly chart.

== Critical reception ==
The song received mixed reception from critics. The Korea Herald gave the song a negative review, saying that the song is "neither catchy nor impactful". Seoul Beats gave the song a mixed review, stating that the track "is a sonic and visual rehash of K-pop tropes that plays things far too safe for a group of their standing." They complimented the song on its simplicity and "cool camera work" shown in the music video.

== Charts ==
=== Weekly chart ===
Chart (2018)	Peak position
South Korea (Gaon)	2

== Awards and nominations ==
=== Music program awards ===
Program	Date	Ref.
M Countdown (Mnet)	June 14, 2018	
Music Bank (KBS)	June 15, 2018	
Music Bank (KBS)	June 22, 2018	
Show Champion (MBC M)	June 13, 2018	
Show Champion (MBC M)	June 20, 2018	
Show! Music Core (MBC)	June 16, 2018	
The Show (SBS M)	June 12, 2018	

== See also ==
- List of M Countdown Chart winners (2018)
