= Burn It Up (Wanna One song) =

2017 song by Wanna One

Single by Wanna One

from the album 1X1=1 (To Be One)
- Released: August 7, 2017
- Genre: EDM; House; K-pop
- Length: 3:34
- Label: YMC Entertainment; Stone Music Entertainment; CJ E&M Music; Pony Canyon
- Songwriters: Min Yeon-Jae; LIØN; Diggy; GRVVITY
- Producers: GRAVVITY; Diggy

Wanna One singles chronology
"Energetic" (2017)	"Burn It Up" (2017)	"Beautiful" (2017)

Music video
- "Burn It Up" on YouTube

"Burn It Up" (Korean: 활활; RR: Hwalhwal) is a song by South Korean boy band Wanna One. It was included in their first extended play, 1X1=1 (To Be One).

== Music video ==
The song's accompanying music video is directed by Baik.

== Critical reception ==
"Burn It Up" was chosen as the stand-out track of the album by Korea JoongAng Daily for its confident and ambitious lyrics and powerful hook, which complements the group's young and cheerful vibe. SBS News said that the choreography of "Burn It Up" depicts a powerful, masculine image of the members.

== Charts ==
=== Weekly chart ===
Chart (2017)	Peak position
South Korean (Gaon)	4

=== Monthly chart ===
Chart (2017)	Peak position
South Korea (Gaon)	12

== Release history ==
Region	Date	Format	Label
South Korea	August 7, 2017	Digital download	YMC Entertainment, CJ E&M Music
Worldwide	August 7, 2017	Digital download	CJ E&M Music

== Sales ==
Region	Sales
South Korea	590,280+

== Awards and nominations ==
=== Gaon Chart Music Awards ===
Year	Category	Result
2018	Song of the Year – August	Nominated
