= Boomerang (Wanna One song) =

2018 single by Wanna One

Single by Wanna One

from the album 0+1=1 (I Promise You)
- Released: March 19, 2018
- Genre: Electro; K-pop
- Length: 3:03
- Label: YMC Entertainment; CJ E&M Music
- Songwriters: Wonderkid; BreadBeat; Roydo; Shaun Kim

Wanna One singles chronology
"I Promise You (I.P.U.)" (2018)	"Boomerang" (2018)	"Light" (2019)

Music video
- "Boomerang" on YouTube

"Boomerang" is a song by South Korean boy band Wanna One. The song serves as the lead single of their album, 0+1=1 (I Promise You).

== Charts ==
=== Weekly chart ===
Chart (2018)	Peak position
South Korea (Gaon)	3

== Awards and nominations ==
=== MBC Plus X Genie Music Awards ===
Year	Category	Result	Ref.
2018	Dance Track (Male)	Nominated	
2018	Song Of The Year	Nominated	

=== Mnet Asian Music Awards ===
Year	Category	Result	Ref.
2018	Song of the Year	Longlisted	
2018	Best Dance Performance Male Group	Nominated	

=== Music program awards ===
Program	Date	Ref.
Show Champion (MBC Music)	March 28, 2018	
Show Champion (MBC Music)	April 4, 2018	
M Countdown (Mnet)	March 29, 2018	
M Countdown (Mnet)	April 5, 2018	
Music Bank (KBS)	March 30, 2018	
Music Bank (KBS)	April 6, 2018	
Music Bank (KBS)	April 13, 2018	
Show! Music Core (MBC)	March 31, 2018	
Show! Music Core (MBC)	April 7, 2018	
The Show (SBS MTV)	April 3, 2018	

=== Melon Popularity Award ===
Award	Date	Ref.
Weekly Popularity Award	April 9, 2018	

== See also ==
- List of M Countdown Chart winners (2018)
