= 0+1=1 (I Promise You) =

EP by Wanna One
- Released: March 19, 2018
- Recorded: 2018
- Length: 24:50
- Language: Korean
- Labels: YMC; Stone Music Entertainment; CJ E&M Music

Wanna One chronology
1-1=0 (Nothing Without You) (2017)	0+1=1 (I Promise You) (2018)	1÷x=1 (Undivided) (2018)

Singles from 0+1=1 (I Promise You)
- 1. "I Promise You (I.P.U.)" Released: March 5, 2018; 2. "Boomerang" Released: March 19, 2018

0+1=1 (I Promise You) is the second extended play by South Korean boy group Wanna One, a project group created through the 2017 Mnet survival show, Produce 101 Season 2, composed of eleven trainees from different entertainment companies that will promote for 18 months under YMC Entertainment. The album was released digitally and physically on March 19, 2018, by YMC Entertainment, Stone Music Entertainment and CJ E&M Music.

== Background and release ==
On February 26, Wanna One announced the release date of the special theme track and their second mini-album, titled 0+1=1 (I Promise You). The special theme track, "I Promise You (I.P.U.)" was released on March 5 along with its music video, marking the 333rd day since the group's first public appearance. The title track "Boomerang" was released on March 19 along with the album. "Boomerang" is an electro trap song that talks about one's heart reaching out to a significant other and returning after making a connection.

== Promotion ==
Wanna One held a comeback show on March 19, which was broadcast live on Mnet. It showcases the group's performances of their new songs as well as behind-the-scenes footage of their music video.

== Commercial performance ==
On March 5, it was announced that the number of pre-orders for the album has surpassed 700,000 copies, breaking the previous record set by the group. "I Promise You (I.P.U.)" topped six online music charts of six major music sites: Melon, Genie, Bugs, Mnet, Naver and Soribada; and achieved a real-time "all-kill" status on the day of its release. The song also won first place on Show! Music Core and Show Champion without any promotion.

== Track listing ==
No.	Title	Lyrics	Music	Arrangement	Length
1.	"Gold"	Assbrass; Kiggen; Esbee; JQ; Hyun Ji-won (Makeumine Works)	Assbrass; Kiggen; Esbee	Assbrass; Kiggen; Esbee	3:39
2.	"I Promise You (I.P.U.)" (약속해요 (I.P.U.))	Galactica*	Galactica*; AthenA; Rovin	Rovin	3:40
3.	"Boomerang" (부메랑)	Roydo; Wonderkid; BreadBeat; Shaun Kim	Roydo; Wonderkid; BreadBeat; Shaun Kim	Shaun Kim; Wonderkid; BreadBeat	3:03
4.	"We Are"	Gravvity; Time; Machine	Gravvity; Time; Machine	Gravvity; Time; Machine	3:21
5.	"Day by Day" (보여)	Jung Ho-hyun (E.One); Kevin Dae (Party in My Pool)	Jung Ho-hyun (E.One)	Jung Ho-hyun (E.One)	3:06
6.	"I'll Remember" (너의 이름을)	Dolly; Shin Kung	Shin Kung; BreadBeat; Song Ho-jin; Wonderkid	Shin Kung; BreadBeat; Song Ho-jin; Wonderkid	3:34
7.	"I Promise You" (Propose version; 약속해요 (고백 ver.))	Galactica*	Galactica*; AthenA	AthenA	4:18
Total length:					24:50

== Charts ==
=== Weekly charts ===
Chart (2018)	Peak position
South Korean Albums (Gaon)	1
US World Albums (Billboard)	10

=== Year-end charts ===
Chart (2018)	Position
South Korean Albums (Gaon)	4

== Certifications ==
Region	Certification	Certified units/sales
South Korea (KMCA)	3× Platinum	750,000^{^}
^{^} Shipments figures based on certification alone.
