= 1×1=1 (To Be One) =

EP by Wanna One
- Released: August 7, 2017
- Genres: Pop; EDM; R&B
- Length: 22:54
- Language: Korean
- Labels: YMC; Stone; CJ E&M Music; Pony Canyon

Wanna One chronology
1×1=1 (To Be One) (2017)	0+1=1 (I Promise You) (2018)

Singles from 1×1=1 (To Be One)
- 1. "Energetic" Released: August 7, 2017; 2. "Burn It Up" Released: August 7, 2017

Repackaged edition cover
- 1−1=0 (Nothing Without You) artwork

Singles from 1−1=0 (Nothing Without You)
- 1. "Beautiful" Released: November 13, 2017

1×1=1 (To Be One) is the debut extended play by South Korean boy group Wanna One, a project group created through the 2017 Mnet survival show, Produce 101 Season 2, composed of eleven trainees from different entertainment companies that will promote for 18 months under YMC Entertainment. The album was released digitally and physically on August 7, 2017, by YMC Entertainment, Stone Music Entertainment and CJ E&M Music. A Japanese version of the album was released on September 27, 2017, through Pony Canyon. The album was re-released under the title 1−1=0 (Nothing Without You) on November 13, 2017.

== Background and release ==
On June 16, 2017, the finalists in survival show Produce 101 Season 2 were revealed and the group immediately started preparations for their debut, starting with recording their own version of the song "It's Me (Pick Me)", "Always" (which was first released as final song for Top 20 finalists), and "Never". In addition, there are also 4 new songs to the album. Among these new songs, "Energetic" a song produced by Pentagon's Hui, which also composed "Never"; and "Burn It Up" were considered for the title track which would be decided by public votes. The album also included a fan-tribute pop song, titled "Wanna Be (My Baby)".

On September 28, 2017, YMC started releasing teasers of the repackaged edition of the album, titled 1−1=0 (Nothing Without You). The repackage serves as a prequel to their first album. In contrast to the energetic and passionate side of the group shown in their first release, Nothing Without You would showcase the members' apprehension about an uncertain future as well as aspiration they had as trainees just months before and "hopes for beautiful days ahead". It was released on November 13, 2017, with four new tracks: the lead single "Beautiful", "Wanna", a funky EDM ballad, "Twilight", a bubbly dance track and "Nothing Without You", the album's harmony-laden intro.

== Promotion ==
Prior to their debut, the group began promotions through their reality show Wanna One Go, which premiered on August 7, 2017, on the cable channel Mnet. During the first episode of Wanna One Go!, it was revealed that "Energetic" won the public vote and will become the title track of the album.

Wanna One held their debut showcase and a small concert on August 7 at Gocheok Sky Dome, which opened to 20,000 attendees. The group had their first music show performance on Mnet's M! Countdown on August 10, 2017. They won their first music trophy on MBC Music's Show! Champion on August 16. The group wrapped up promotions with the August 30 airing of Show! Champion, with 15 music show trophies for "Energetic", making it the winningest K-pop debut song since Seo Taiji and Boys - a record it still holds as of May 2022.

The second season of Wanna One Go!, titled Wanna One Go: Zero Base, aired its first episode on November 3, 2017, prior to the group's repackage release. Wanna One held a comeback show for their repackaged album, which was broadcast live on Mnet and tvN on November 13. It showcases the group's performances of their new songs as well as the stories behind the creation of the new album. Their first comeback stage took place on November 17 on KBS' Music Bank. The group received their first win for "Beautiful" on MBC Music's Show Champion on November 22.

== Commercial performance ==
=== 1×1=1 (To Be One) ===
The album reached 600,000 preorder copies prior to its release, making it the debut K-pop album with the highest number of pre-orders.

To Be One debuted at No. 3 on Billboard's World Albums chart and earned first-place rankings on iTunes Top Albums chart in 11 countries. It topped Gaon's Monthly Album chart for the month of August, selling over 704,000 copies. As of October 2021, it has sold 805,000 copies, still holding the record for the best selling debut album for a K-pop group since Seo Taiji and Boys.

The title song, "Energetic" topped six online music charts of six major music sites: Melon, Genie, Bugs, Mnet, Naver and Soribada; and achieved a real-time "all-kill" status. The other album tracks also secured spots within the Top 10 positions.

=== 1−1=0 (Nothing Without You) ===
On October 30, 2017, YMC announced that the number of preorders for the repackaged album has reached more than 500,000 copies. With the combined sales of their first album and its repackaged edition, Wanna One became only the third Korean group to sell a million copies of their debut album, and the first since Seo Taiji and Boys did so with their eponymous debut in 1992.

The title track, "Beautiful" charted atop on real-time charts of six music sites: Melon, Genie, Bugs, Mnet, Naver, and Soribada upon its release. In addition, three other new tracks of the album placed in the top 10 of all six charts.

== Track listing ==
1×1=1 (To Be One) track lisiting
No.	Title	Lyrics	Music	Arrangement	Length
1.	"To Be One" (intro)	Galactika*	Galactika*; AthenA	Galactika*	1:06
2.	"Burn It Up" (활활)	Min Yeon-jae; Liøn	Diggy; Liøn; Grvvity	Grvvity; Diggy	3:34
3.	"Energetic" (에너제틱)	Hui; Wooseok	Flow Blow; Hui	Flow Blow	3:09
4.	"Wanna Be (My Baby)"	1Take; Tak	1Take; Tak	1Take; Tak	3:21
5.	"Always" (이 자리에; acoustic version)	Real Men; Wooki)	Real Men; Paper Planet	Real Men	4:21
Total length:					15:31

To Be One track listing – CD only tracks
No.	Title	Lyrics	Music	Arrangement	Length
6.	"It's Me (Pick Me)" (나야 나; Wanna One version)	Produce 101	Ryan S. Jhun; Emile Ghantous; Keith Hetrick; Appu Krishan; Cheryline Lim; Jason Jones; Zaydro; RHeaT	Ryan S. Jhun; Zaydro; RHeaT	4:07
7.	"Never" (Wanna One version)	Hui; E'Dawn; Wooseok (Pentagon)	Hui; Flow Blow	Flow Blow	3:16
Total length:					22:54

1−1=0 (Nothing Without You) track listing
No.	Title	Lyrics	Music	Arrangement	Length
1.	"Nothing Without You" (intro)	Tenzo; Tasco	Tenzo; Tasco	Tenzo; Tasco	1:23
2.	"Beautiful"	Tenzo; Kebee	Tenzo; Wooziq	Wooziq	3:17
3.	"Wanna" (갖고 싶어)	Jung Ho-hyun (E.One); Party in the Pool	Jung Ho-hyun (E.One)	Jung Ho-hyun (E.One)	3:40
4.	"Twilight"	Kim Won; Mad Finger	Kim Won; Mad Finger	Kim Won; Mad Finger	3:14
5.	"Burn It Up" (Prequel remix)	Min Yeon-jae; Godok	Diggy; Godok; Grvvity	Grvvity; Diggy	3:37
6.	"Energetic" (Prequel remix)	Hui; Wooseok	Flow Blow; Hui	Tak	4:16
7.	"Wanna Be (My baby)"				3:21
8.	"Energetic"				3:09
9.	"Burn It Up"				3:34
10.	"To Be One" (Outro)	Galactika*	Galactika*; AthenA	AthenA	1:21
Total length:					30:52

Nothing Without You – CD only tracks
No.	Title	Lyrics	Music	Arrangement	Length
11.	"Wanna Be (My Baby)" (Premier Show-Con Live version)	1Take; Tak	1Take; Tak	1Take; Tak	3:46
Total length:					34:38

== Charts ==
=== Weekly ===
Chart (2017)	Peak position	
Chart (2017)	TBO	NWY
French Albums (SNEP)	151	—
Japan Albums (Oricon)	12	8
South Korean Albums (Gaon)	1	1
US World Albums (Billboard)	3	12

=== Monthly ===
Chart (2017)	Peak position	
Chart (2017)	TBO	NWY
South Korea (Gaon)	1	1

=== Sales ===
Region	Sales
South Korea (Gaon)	1,452,770+
Japan (Oricon)	68,248+

== Awards and nominations ==
=== Mnet Asian Music Awards ===
Year	Nominee / work	Award	Result
2017	1×1=1 (To Be One)	Album of the Year	Nominated

=== Gaon Chart Music Awards ===
Year	Nominee / work	Award	Result
2018	1×1=1 (To Be One)	Album of the Year – 3rd Quarter	Nominated
2018	1−1=0 (Nothing Without You)	Album of the Year – 4th Quarter	Won
2018	1×1=1 (To Be One)	New Artist of the Year (Album)	Won

=== MBC Plus X Genie Music Awards ===
Year	Nominee / work	Award	Result
2018	1−1=0 (Nothing Without You)	Digital Album of the Year	Nominated

=== Korea Popular Music Awards ===
Year	Nominee / work	Award	Result
2018	1−1=0 (Nothing Without You)	Best Album	Nominated
