= Wanna One =

South Korean boy band

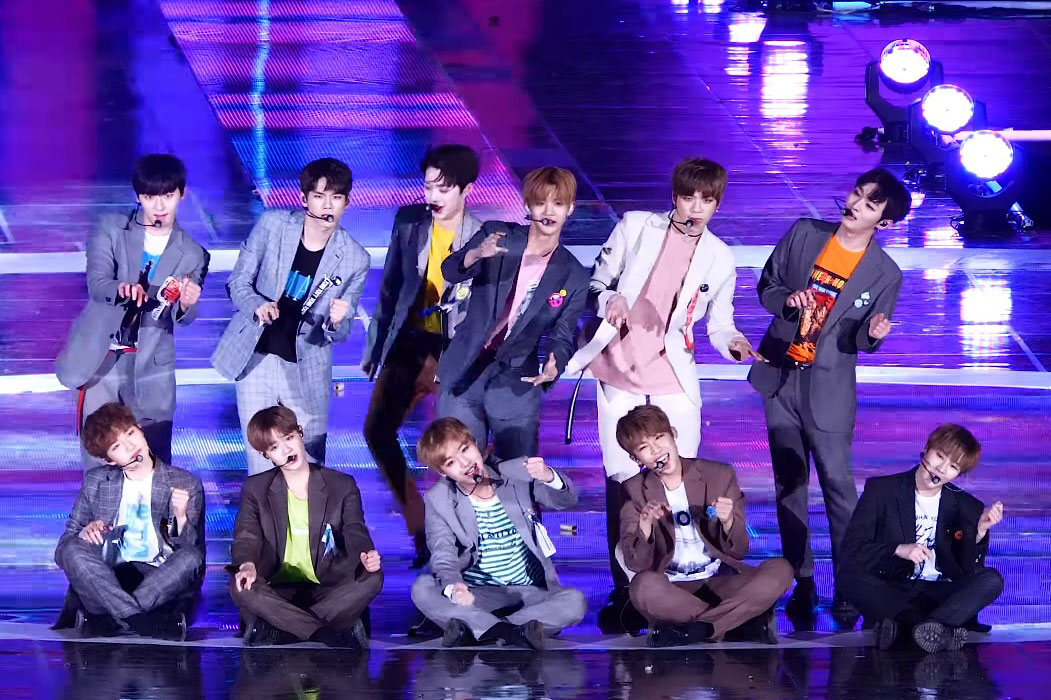
- Wanna One performing at Dream Concert 2017; Upper: Min-hyun, Seong-wu, Kuan-lin, Jin-young, Daniel, Ji-sung; Lower: Jae-hwan, Dae-hwi, Ji-hoon, Woo-jin, Sung-woon (From left to right)

Background information
- Origin: South Korea
- Genres: K-pop; EDM; Hip hop; R&B
- Years active: 2017–2019; 2021–2022; 2026–present
- Labels: YMC; Stone Music; Swing
- Spinoff of: Produce 101 season 2
- Past members: Yoon Ji-sung; Ha Sung-woon; Hwang Min-hyun; Ong Seong-wu; Kim Jae-hwan; Kang Daniel; Park Ji-hoon; Park Woo-jin; Bae Jin-young; Lee Dae-hwi; Lai Kuan-lin
- Website: wannaonego.mwave.me/wannaone

Wanna One (Korean: 워너원) was a South Korean boy band formed by CJ E&M through the second season of Produce 101. The group was composed of eleven members: Kang Daniel, Park Ji-hoon, Lee Dae-hwi, Kim Jae-hwan, Ong Seong-wu, Park Woo-jin, Lai Kuan-lin, Yoon Ji-sung, Hwang Min-hyun, Bae Jin-young, and Ha Sung-woon. The group debuted on August 7, 2017, under Swing Entertainment and CJ E&M. Their contract ended on December 31, 2018, but their final activity as a group was their single album B-side released on January 27, 2022.

== History ==
=== Pre-debut: Produce 101 ===
Wanna One was formed through the 'survival' competition series Produce 101 (season 2), which aired on Mnet from April 7 until June 16, 2017. Out of an initial 101 trainees representing various agencies, the final 11 were chosen by audience voting and announced via live television broadcast.

Before appearing on the program, several members had already been active in the entertainment industry. Park Ji-hoon was a child actor and had appeared in drama series such as Kimchi Cheese Smile and The King & I. He also made appearances on several variety shows alongside the boy bands Big Bang and SS501. In 2012, Hwang Min-hyun made his musical debut as a member of the group NU'EST. Kim Jae-hwan made his first appearance on season 2 of Korea's Got Talent but was eliminated during the semi-final. In 2014, Ha Sung-woon had previously debuted as a member of the group Hotshot.

=== 2017: Debut with 1X1=1 (To Be One) and 1-1=0 (Nothing Without You) ===
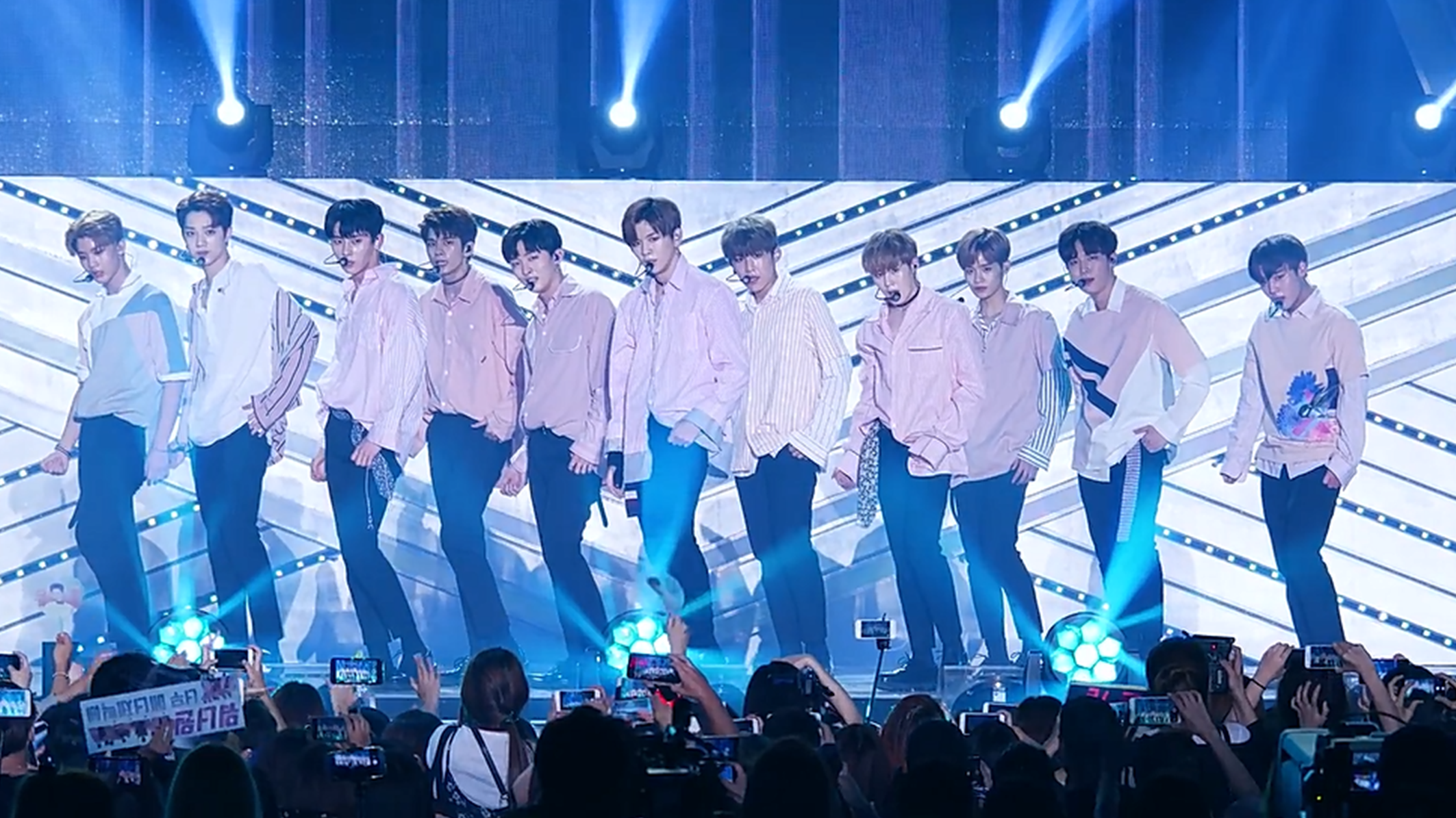
Wanna One performing at the Incheon K-POP Concert on September 9, 2017.

Wanna One signed with YMC Entertainment (who previously managed season one's winning group I.O.I). Unlike I.O.I, however, Wanna One members were not permitted to participate in other activities with their original agencies.

The group participated in a final concert that took place on July 1 and 2, 2017 at Olympic Hall in Seoul to mark the end of Produce 101. Wanna One officially debuted at an event titled Wanna One Premier Show-Con that took place at the Gocheok Sky Dome on August 7, 2017. The group released their debut extended play 1×1=1 (To Be One) on August 8, 2017, with the title song "Energetic", originally composed by Hui of Pentagon and FlowBlow, with lyrics written by Hui and Wooseok of Pentagon. Two music videos were released for their debut, for "Energetic" and "Burn It Up".

On November 13, Wanna One released their repackaged album, 1-1=0 (Nothing Without You), with the title track "Beautiful". With the combined sales of their first album and its repackaged edition, Wanna One became only the third Korean group to sell a million copies of their debut album, and the first since Seo Taiji and Boys did so with their eponymous debut in 1992.

=== 2018: Golden Age Begins, unit project and world tour ===
In February, Wanna One posted a series of teaser images titled 2018 Golden Age Begins. On March 5, Wanna One released their special theme track, "I Promise You (I.P.U.)" along with its music video. It was also announced that the number of preorders for their second extended play, 0+1=1 (I Promise You) had surpassed 700,000 copies, breaking the previous record set by the group. The album was released on March 19, along with the title track "Boomerang".

In April, Wanna One announced that the members would split into multiple units and collaborate with different artists such as Dynamic Duo, Zico, Nell and Heize for their upcoming special album. The album was later revealed to be titled 1÷x=1 (Undivided), which was released on June 4 along with the title track "Light".

The group also announced their first world tour, titled "One: The World", which would span 13 different cities around the world and begin on June 1.

Wanna One's contract with YMC Entertainment expired on May 31. Starting from June 1, Wanna One would be managed under Swing Entertainment, a new agency exclusively established for the group. This new arrangement would still maintain the partnership with YMC.

On October 30, 2018, Wanna One released a teaser video and also revealed the title of their 1st studio album, 1¹¹=1 (Power of Destiny). The album was released on November 19, along with the title track "Spring Breeze".

=== 2019: Final concert and disbandment ===
On December 18, 2018, Swing Entertainment released an official statement that the group's contract will end on its original planned date, December 31, 2018. Swing also stated that all agencies came to an agreement that will allow the members to attend scheduled year-end shows and award ceremonies throughout January 2019. The group concluded activities with a final concert (titled Therefore 2019). The concert was held at the Gocheok Sky Dome in Seoul, where the group held their debut showcase.

=== 2021–2022, 2026: Reunion ===
On November 15, 2021, it was confirmed that the group, except Lai Kuan-lin, would perform on a reunion stage at the 2021 Mnet Asian Music Awards on December 11, 2021. It was also reported that CJ E&M, together with the members' current agencies, is in talks for the group to have a concert and album in the future. However, Pledis Entertainment announced that Hwang Min-hyun is only performing with the group at the 2021 Mnet Asian Music Awards reunion stage, and will return to NU'EST and his solo projects afterward. Ong Seong-wu is also only scheduled to perform at the reunion stage and will not join subsequent activities, citing the back-to-back filming of his ongoing drama series and two films that he is confirmed to star in. The group performed "Energetic", "Burn It Up", and a new song "Beautiful (Part 3)", scheduled for release on January 27, 2022, as an album title B-Side. Swing Entertainment also launched the group's YouTube channel for archive purposes.

In April 2026, the group reunited (minus Kang Daniel and Lai Kuan-lin), as part of a reality series called Wanna One Go: Back to Base. Kang Daniel and Lai Kuan-lin made brief appearances due to Kang's military service and Lai's retirement as an entertainer and career change to a film director. Soundtrack singles "We Wanna Go" and "Spring Breeze, Again" were released to accompany the show. In August, the group reunited on Day 1 of KCON LA performing "Energetic", "Boomerang", and "Spring Breeze, Again" marking their first group stage in over four years.

== Impact ==
The group was recognized for their brand recognition and marketing power, having topped the "Boy Group Brand Power Ranking" published by the Korean Corporate Reputation Research Institute for four months; as well as viewership ratings of the TV shows they appeared on. In 2017, they ranked second in the "30 Power People" survey by Ilgan Sports, for their influence among broadcasting companies and advertisers; and sixth in the "Top 10 Artist" of Gallup Korea survey. The group was also chosen as "Best K-pop Artist of 2017". For their achievements, Wanna One ranked second on Forbes Korea Power Celebrity list in 2018, which ranks South Korea's most powerful and influential celebrities, while third the following year.

=== Endorsements ===
In 2017, Wanna One was featured in 16 advertisements including cosmetics, clothing, mobile games, foods and beverages, and more.

== Members ==
- Yoon Ji-sung (윤지성) – leader
- Ha Sung-woon (하성운)
- Hwang Min-hyun (황민현)
- Ong Seong-wu (옹성우)
- Kim Jae-hwan (김재환)
- Kang Daniel (강다니엘)
- Park Ji-hoon (박지훈)
- Park Woo-jin (박우진)
- Bae Jin-young (배진영)
- Lee Dae-hwi (이대휘)
- Lai Kuan-lin (賴冠霖; 라이관린)

== Discography ==
- 1¹¹=1 (Power of Destiny) (2018)

== Filmography ==
=== Television ===
- Produce 101 (season 2) (Mnet, 2017)
- Wanna One Go (Mnet, 2017)
- Wanna City (SBS Mobidic, 2017)
- Wanna One Go Season 2: Zero Base (Mnet, 2017)
- Wanna One Go in Jeju
- Wanna One Go Season 3: X-CON (Mnet, 2018)
- Wanna Travel (Olleh TV, 2018)
- Wanna Travel Season 2 (Olleh TV, 2018)
- Wanna One Go: Back to Base (2026)
- Wanna One Go in LA (2026)

== Concert and tours ==
=== Showcases ===
- Wanna One Premier Show-Con (2017)

=== Headlining tours ===
- Wanna One World Tour – One: The World (2018)

=== Concerts ===
- Wanna One Final Concert – "Therefore" (2019)

== Awards and nominations ==
Wanna One achieved the "Rookie Grand Slam" in 2018, having won Newcomer awards from major award ceremonies such as Mnet Asian Music Awards, Golden Disc Awards, Seoul Music Awards, Melon Music Awards and Gaon Chart Music Awards. Billboard chose them as the Best New K-Pop Act of 2017.
