= List of Knowing Bros episodes =

Knowing Bros (Korean: 아는 형님; RR: Aneun hyeongnim), also known as Men on a Mission or Ask Us Anything, is a South Korean variety show, produced by SM C&C and distributed by JTBC every Saturday. This show is classified as a reality television-variety show, where the cast members and guests gather in a classroom environment and discuss personal topics and further play various games.

Knowing Bros first aired on December 5, 2015. As of November 7, 2026, 550 episodes of Knowing Bros have been aired.

== Series overview ==
Year	Episodes	Originally aired	
Year	Episodes	First aired	Last aired
2015	4	December 5, 2015	December 26, 2015
2016	52	January 2, 2016	December 24, 2016
2017	52	January 7, 2017	December 30, 2017
2018	52	January 6, 2018	December 29, 2018
2019	51	January 5, 2019	December 28, 2019
2020	50	January 4, 2020	December 26, 2020
2021	51	January 2, 2021	December 25, 2021
2022	52	January 1, 2022	December 31, 2022
2023	50	January 7, 2023	December 23, 2023
2024	49	January 6, 2024	December 28, 2024
2025	48	January 11, 2025	December 13, 2025
2026	TBA	January 3, 2026	TBA

== 2015 ==
In the table below, the blue numbers represent the lowest ratings and the red numbers represent the highest ratings.

List of episodes in 2015 (episode 1–4)

Ep. #	Air Date	Guest(s)/Topic	Remarks	AGB Nielsen Ratings
1	December 5, 2015	No guests	Pilot episode Special Guests: Gwon Dam-hye (gynaecologist), Kim Yeo-won(script writer for the show); Specially produced to celebrate the 5 year anniversary of JTBC	1.809%
2	December 12, 2015	No guests	Using the Senses; Min Kyung-hoon joined the regular cast	1.140%
3	December 19, 2015	No guests	Winter	1.548%
4	December 28, 2015	No guests	End of the Year Party's Special	1.405%

== 2016 ==
In the table below, the blue numbers represent the lowest ratings and the red numbers represent the highest ratings.

List of episodes in 2016 (episode 5–56)

Ep. #	Air Date	Guest(s)	Remark	AGB Nielsen Ratings
5	January 2, 2016	Jang Hang-jun, Jung Hyung-jin	Special Guests: Park Hee-geon, Lim Hyeong-chan (EP.6); Hwang Chi-yeul's last episode as a regular cast (EP.6)	1.169%
6	January 9, 2016	Jang Hang-jun, Jung Hyung-jin	Special Guests: Park Hee-geon, Lim Hyeong-chan (EP.6); Hwang Chi-yeul's last episode as a regular cast (EP.6)	1.149%
7	January 16, 2016	No guests	Kim Se-hwang's last episode as a regular cast	1.359%
8	January 23, 2016	Sol Bi, Hong Jin-ho	Special Guests: Lee Min-ji, Kim Jeong-jin, Kim Ye-rin, So A-reum, Park A-reum, Park Se-jin, Han Ho-jeong	1.915%
9	January 30, 2016	Shin Dong-woo, Lee Soo-min	Substitute for Kim Hee-chul: Henry (Super Junior-M); Kim Hee-chul is absent	1.344%
10	February 6, 2016	Park Mi-sun, Jo Hye-ryun, Lee Ji-hye, Shin Bong-sun, Park Seul-gi	Seollal Special; Special Guests: Han Suk-joon, Ahn Na-kyung; Kim Hee-chul is absent	1.708%
11	February 13, 2016	Lee Guk-joo, Kim Ji-min, Lady Jane, Jo Young-gu	Special Guest: Jang Sung-kyu	1.855%
12	February 20, 2016	No guests	Special Guests: 100 citizens from Ilsan	1.601%
13	February 27, 2016	No guests		1.717%
14	March 5, 2016	Oh Sang-jin, Lee Chun-soo, Lee Sang-min	Format change: Mental Victory Battle; Special Guest: Kim Tae-hyun (Prime Kings)	1.432%
15	March 12, 2016	Kim Heung-gook, Kim Kyung-sik	Lee Sang-min joined the regular cast	1.477%
16	March 19, 2016	Joo Young-hoon, Kim Soo-ro, Cosmic Girls		1.542%
17	March 26, 2016	Sol Bi, Hong Jin-young, Hello Venus (Except: Yooyoung)	Format change: Brother School; Special Guest: Kim Sun-jin	1.679%
18	April 2, 2016	Eun Ji-won, Kang Kyun-sung (Noel)	Special Guest: Sohn In-soo	1.518%
19	April 9, 2016	Kang Ye-won		1.474%
20	April 16, 2016	Shin So-yul	Special Guest: Kwon Jin-yeong; The only time the guest appeared as a teacher	1.155%
21	April 23, 2016	Red Velvet (Except: Irene)		1.327%
22	April 30, 2016	Jun Hyo-seong (Secret), Gyeongree (Nine Muses)		1.632%
23	May 7, 2016	I.O.I	Special EP: "Knowing Girls"; Special Guests: Jang Sung-kyu, 80 staff members, Kim Chae-rin	2.209%
24	May 14, 2016	Han Chae-ah	Special Guest: Nancy Lang	1.899%
25	May 21, 2016	Andy (Shinhwa), Sunny (Girls' Generation)		1.917%
26	May 28, 2016	Park Joon-hyung (g.o.d), Lee Soo-min		1.927%
27	June 4, 2016	Twice		2.656%
28	June 11, 2016	Jeon So-min		1.952%
29	June 18, 2016	Kim Jong-hyun (Shinee), Irene (Red Velvet)	Special Guest: Woo Hyun-young	2.152%
30	June 25, 2016	Jeon Hye-bin		2.909%
31	July 2, 2016	Kim Jong-min, Seo In-young, Jessi		3.064%
32	July 9, 2016	Sistar	Special Guest: Hwang Chi-yeul	3.090%
33	July 16, 2016	Jun Hyun-moo, Kim Shin-young	Special Guest: Jang Sung-kyu; Press Conference for achieving the 3% ratings	3.728%
34	July 23, 2016	Lovelyz	Special EP: "Brothers Club VS Sisters Club"	2.368%
35	July 30, 2016	Tak Jae-hoon, Lee Soo-min		3.399%
36	August 6, 2016	Kim Jun-ho, Baek Ji-young		2.830%
37	August 13, 2016	Lee Kyu-han, Im Soo-hyang		3.099%
38	August 20, 2016	GFriend		2.991%
39	August 27, 2016	Sung Hoon, Kim Jin-kyung		2.434%
40	September 3, 2016	Im Chang-jung, Solbin (Laboum)		2.890%
41	September 10, 2016	Park Mi-sun, Jo Hye-ryun, Sol Bi, Hong Jin-young, Park Na-rae, Heo Young-ji, Jo Jung-min	Chuseok Special; Special Guest: Jang Sung-kyu (ep.42)	2.971%
42	September 17, 2016	Park Mi-sun, Jo Hye-ryun, Sol Bi, Hong Jin-young, Park Na-rae, Heo Young-ji, Jo Jung-min	Chuseok Special; Special Guest: Jang Sung-kyu (ep.42)	2.375%
43	September 24, 2016	Gain (Brown Eyed Girls), Ji Soo		2.597%
44	October 1, 2016	DIA	Special EP: "Girl Group Laboratory"; Special Guest: Jang Sung-kyu	2.249%
45	October 8, 2016	Lee Si-young		3.879%
46	October 15, 2016	Infinite	Special Guest: Jang Sung-kyu, Ryu Hwa-young (via phone)	2.967%
47	October 22, 2016	Hwang Woo-seul-hye, Kyuhyun (Super Junior)		3.107%
48	October 29, 2016	Kangta, Davichi		3.509%
49	November 5, 2016	Choo Sung-hoon, Yuri (Girls' Generation)		3.338%
50	November 12, 2016	Shinee		3.624%
51	November 19, 2016	No guests	Special EP: "Duet Project: Universe Cowards"; Kim Hee-chul and Min Kyung-hoon appeared as transfer students Special Guests: Lee Sang-jun (composer), Momo (Twice), Taeyeon (Girls' Generation) (via phone), AOA (Seolhyun, Hyejeong) (via phone); MV: "Sweet Dream"	2.178%
52	November 26, 2016	Jin Se-yeon		2.960%
53	December 3, 2016	I.O.I	Special Guest: Jang Sung-kyu	3.453%
54	December 10, 2016	Chun Jung-myung, Han Seung-yeon	Special Guest: Ha Ji-won (via phone)	3.242%
55	December 17, 2016	Heo Kyung-hwan, Mamamoo		3.779%
56	December 24, 2016	Yoo In-young, Hyun-soo Kim	Christmas Special	2.870%

== 2017 ==
In the table below, the blue numbers represent the lowest ratings and the red numbers represent the highest ratings.

List of episodes in 2017 (episode 57–108)

Ep. #	Air Date	Guest(s)	Remarks	AGB Nielsen Ratings
57	January 7, 2017	AOA (Except: Choa)	Special Guest: Jang Sung-kyu	4.153%
58	January 14, 2017	Rain, Hani (EXID)	Special Guests: Mo Je-uk, Hong Ji Yoon	4.800%
59	January 21, 2017	Cosmic Girls	Special EP: "Ultimate high school matchup" Special Guest: Jang Sung-kyu	3.034%
60	January 28, 2017	Park Mi-sun, Jo Hye-ryun, Sol Bi, Hong Jin-young, Oh Na-mi, Cao Lu (Fiestar), Yoon Chae-kyung (April)	Seollal Special	3.349%
61	February 4, 2017	Jo Woo-jong, Jung So-min	Special Guest: Jang Sung-kyu	3.877%
62	February 11, 2017	Super Junior (Leeteuk, Shindong)		4.246%
63	February 18, 2017	Lee Joon, Seohyun (Girls' Generation)		4.172%
64	February 25, 2017	Kang Ye-won, Han Chae-ah		3.921%
65	March 4, 2017	Oh Ji-ho, Seo Ye-ji		4.195%
66	March 11, 2017	Kim Hee-sun	Special Guest: Jang Sung-kyu	5.333%
67	March 18, 2017	Han Eun-jung, Henry (Super Junior-M)		4.102%
68	March 25, 2017	Girl's Day	Special Guest: Kim Ae-sook (Kim Young-chul's older sister); Kim Young-chul is absent	4.354%
69	April 1, 2017	Lee Kyung-kyu		5.609%
70	April 8, 2017	Jung Joon-young, Lee Sun-bin		4.328%
71	April 15, 2017	No guests	Special EP: "Promise fulfillment for achieved 5% ratings" Special Guest: Jang Han-young; MV: "Brother's School"	4.453%
72	April 22, 2017	Park Sung-woong, Chae Jung-an		5.915%
73	May 6, 2017	Yoon Jong-shin, Ock Joo-hyun	Special Guest: Jang Sung-kyu	5.307%
74	April 29, 2017	BtoB	Special Guest: Jang Sung-kyu	5.280%
75	May 13, 2017	Psy	Special Guests: Jang Sung-kyu, Momoland	6.990%
76	May 20, 2017	Twice	Special Guest: Jang Sung-kyu	4.832%
77	May 27, 2017	Oh Hyun-kyung, DinDin	Special Guest: Jang Sung-kyu	4.901%
78	June 3, 2017	Lee Soo-kyung, Lee Hong-gi (F.T. Island)	Special Guest: Park Shin-hye (via phone)	4.303%
79	June 10, 2017	Kim Ok-vin	Special Guest: Jang Sung-kyu (voice only)	5.188%
80	June 17, 2017	Hwang Chi-yeul, John Park, Kim So-eun		4.150%
81	June 24, 2017	Apink	Special Guest: Jang Sung-kyu	5.449%
82	July 1, 2017	Han Chae-young, Minzy		4.618%
83	July 8, 2017	Jung Yong-hwa (CNBLUE), Zico (Block B)		4.605%
84	July 15, 2017	Red Velvet	Substitute for Kim Young-chul: K Jun; Kim Young-chul is absent	4.414%
85	July 22, 2017	Exo (Except: Lay)	Special Guest: Jang Sung-kyu	4.466%
86	July 29, 2017	Lee Jong-hyuk, Kim Jong-kook (Turbo)	Special Guests: Turbo (Kim Jung-nam, Mikey)	5.218%
87	August 5, 2017	Blackpink		4.693%
88	August 12, 2017	Girls' Generation		6.071%
89	August 19, 2017	Girls' Generation		4.905%
90	August 26, 2017	Taeyang (BigBang), Song Min-ho (WINNER)	Special Guest: Jang Sung-kyu	5.065%
91	September 2, 2017	Yoo Jun-sang, Jang Yoon-jeong		5.282%
92	September 9, 2017	Park Sung-kwang, Hyuna, JR (NU'EST)		4.654%
93	September 16, 2017	B1A4		4.040%
94	September 23, 2017	BTS	Special Guest: Jang Sung-kyu	4.414%
95	September 30, 2017	Park Mi-sun, Jo Hye-ryun, Jang Do-yeon, Hong Jin-young, Lee Tae-im, Han Sun-hwa	Chuseok Special; Special Guest: Jang Sung-kyu	5.088%
96	October 7, 2017	Park Mi-sun, Jo Hye-ryun, Jang Do-yeon, Hong Jin-young, Lee Tae-im, Han Sun-hwa	Chuseok Special; Special Guest: Jang Sung-kyu	4.824%
97	October 14, 2017	TVXQ		4.456%
98	October 21, 2017	Yoon Jung-soo, Ha Yeon-soo		5.688%
99	October 28, 2017	Lee Ha-nui		5.573%
100	November 4, 2017	Super Junior (Leeteuk, Yesung, Shindong, Eunhyuk, Donghae)	Special Guest: Jang Sung-kyu; Kim Hee-chul appeared as a transfer student	5.383%
101	November 11, 2017	Han Hye-jin, Lee Si-eon		6.106%
102	November 18, 2017	Sung Dong-il, Goo Hara	Special Guest: Baek Yoon-sik	6.498%
103	November 25, 2017	Jin Goo, Go Joon-hee		5.259%
104	December 2, 2017	Jang Yoon-ju, Sunmi		5.933%
105	December 9, 2017	Yoon Se-ah, Junho (2PM)		6.059%
106	December 16, 2017	Sechs Kies	Special Guest: Jang Sung-kyu	5.689%
107	December 23, 2017	No Guests	End Of The Year Special; Special Guests: Oh My Girl (ep.107); Special EP: "Question Solving Picnic"	5.379%
108	December 30, 2017	Oh My Girl	End Of The Year Special; Special Guests: Oh My Girl (ep.107); Special EP: "Question Solving Picnic"	4.082%

== 2018 ==
In the table below, the blue numbers represent the lowest ratings and the red numbers represent the highest ratings.

List of episodes in 2018 (episode 109–160)

Ep. #	Air Date	Guest(s)	Remarks	AGB Nielsen Ratings
109	January 6, 2018	Uhm Jung-hwa		6.278%
110	January 13, 2018	Hong Seok-cheon, Jang Seo-hee	Special Guest: Jang Sung-kyu, Lee Young-ae (via phone)	5.572%
111	January 20, 2018	Lee Sang-yeob, BoA	Special Guest: Jang Sung-kyu; Kim Hee-chul left during the "Three No's" segment to attend the 32nd Golden Disc Awards	5.510%
112	January 27, 2018	Lee Da-hee, Han Hyun-min	Special Guest: Jang Sung-kyu	5.822%
113	February 3, 2018	Seungri (BigBang), iKON (Yunhyeong, Bobby, B.I, Ju-ne)	Special Guest: Park Ki-ryang	4.909%
114	February 10, 2018	Song Eun-i, Yoo Se-yoon, Hong Jin-young	Special EP: "Knowing Bros Music Video Battle"; Special Guests: Jang Sung-kyu; Universe Cowards section: Song Ji-hyo, Shindong (Super Junior), Lee Sang-jun (composer), Jang Jae-ha (producer), Kim Cho-yeon, Yoon Sang-woong (assistant producers); Jo Kwang-hee (martial arts supervisor), Kevin (sound director), Lee So-hee (makeup), Yang Hee-eun (via phone), Roh Ji-sun (Fromis 9), Park Mi-sun (via phone); Kim Young-chul section: Gong Chan-soo, Noh Sang-yeop, Lee Hyun-jeong (composers), Wheesung (via phone), K-TIGERS, Uhm Jung-hwa (via phone)	3.670%
115	February 17, 2018	Song Eun-i, Yoo Se-yoon, Hong Jin-young, Shindong (Super Junior), Jo Hye-ryun	Special EP: "Knowing Bros Music Video Battle"; Special Guests: Universe Cowards section: Roh Ji-sun (Fromis 9), Park Mi-sun; MV: "Falling Blossoms; Kim Young-chul section: Kim Hee-sun (via phone), Momoland (Hyebin, Yeonwoo, JooE), Wheesung(Realslow), K-TIGERS, Uhm Jung-hwa; MV: "Andenayon"; Kang Ho-dong section: NANA Choreographer Crew; MV: "I kicked my luck off" Lee Sang-min left midway due to scheduling conflict	2.851%
116	February 24, 2018	Park Se-young, Jung Hye-sung		2.711%
117	March 3, 2018	Boom, Ahn So-hee		4.630%
118	March 10, 2018	Park Jin-young, Got7	Special Guest: Shindong (Super Junior); BamBam, Mark Tuan, and Choi Young-jae appear in second half.	5.658%
119	March 17, 2018	Wheesung, Kang Han-na		4.246%
120	March 24, 2018	Song Ji-hyo, Lee El		5.566%
121	March 31, 2018	Lee Seung-hoon, Kim Min-seok, Chung Jae-won		5.354%
122	April 7, 2018	Wanna One		5.306%
123	April 14, 2018	Yoo Min-sang, Moon Se-yoon		6.105%
124	April 21, 2018	Lee Seung-gi		6.224%
125	April 28, 2018	Ji Sang-ryeol, Jo Bo-ah		4.619%
126	May 5, 2018	Song So-hee, MC Gree		4.981%
127	May 12, 2018	Yoo Byung-jae, WINNER		5.434%
128	May 19, 2018	Hwangbo, Hyoyeon (Girls' Generation), Hwasa (Mamamoo), Dayoung (Cosmic Girls)	Special Guest: Jang Sung-kyu	5.449%
129	May 26, 2018	So Yoo-jin, Sam Okyere		6.158%
130	June 2, 2018	Kim Shin-young, AOA (Jimin, Seolhyun)	Special Guest: Jang Sung-kyu	5.204%
131	June 9, 2018	Go Ara, L (Infinite)		5.648%
132	June 16, 2018	Jang Do-yeon, Shinee (Key, Minho)	Special Guest: Shindong (Super Junior)	4.571%
133	June 23, 2018	Noh Sa-yeon, Haha	Special Guest: Zizo	5.961%
134	June 30, 2018	Apink	Special Guest: Shindong (Super Junior)	5.710%
135	July 7, 2018	Bora, Nara (Hello Venus), Momoland (Yeonwoo, JooE)		5.145%
136	July 14, 2018	Koo Jun-yup (Clon), Eunhyuk (Super Junior), Taemin (Shinee), Shownu (Monsta X)	Special Guest: Jang Sung-kyu	4.496%
137	July 21, 2018	Im Soo-hyang, Cha Eun-woo (Astro)	Special Guest: Shindong (Super Junior)	4.237%
138	July 28, 2018	Kim Dong-hyun, Zico (Block B)	Special Guest: Jang Sung-kyu	4.670%
139	August 4, 2018	Red Velvet	Special Guest: Shindong (Super Junior)	4.602%
140	August 11, 2018	Jung Sang-hoon, Son Dam-bi		5.135%
141	August 18, 2018	Park Joon-hyung (g.o.d), BamBam (Got7), Lucas (NCT), Yuqi ((G)I-dle)	Special Guest: Jang Sung-kyu	4.527%
142	August 25, 2018	Yoon Do-hyun (YB), Ha Hyun-woo (Guckkasten)	Special Guests: Im Byung-soo, Jang Sung-kyu	4.995%
143	September 1, 2018	Kim Ji-hyun, Shin Jung-hwan, Chae Ri-na		2.092%
144	September 8, 2018	Song Kyung-ah, Hyolyn, Yura (Girl's Day), Mijoo (Lovelyz)	Special Guest: Jang Sung-kyu	4.179%
145	September 15, 2018	Kim Sung-ryung, K.Will	Special Guest: Jang Sung-kyu	3.620%
146	September 22, 2018	Lee Man-ki, Sayuri Fujita, Hong Yoon-hwa	Chuseok Special	5.786%
147	September 29, 2018	Lee Man-ki, Sayuri Fujita, Hong Yoon-hwa, Park Mi-sun, Lee Soo-ji, Gyeongree (Nine Muses), JooE (Momoland)	Chuseok Special; Special Guests: Jang Sung-kyu, Mo Je-uk, Kim Yon-ja	4.703%
148	October 6, 2018	Park Joo-mi, Park Sung-kwang		5.510%
149	October 13, 2018	Hong Jin-kyung, Nam Chang-hee, Kim In-seok, Yoon Sung-ho	Special Guest: Jang Sung-kyu	5.499%
150	October 20, 2018	Lee Joon-gi, IU		6.376%
151	October 27, 2018	Lee Joon-gi, IU		5.934%
152	November 3, 2018	Twice	Special Guest: Jang Sung-kyu	5.928%
153	November 10, 2018	Lee Sang-yeob, On Joo-wan, Lee Su-hyun (AKMU), Kim Sae-ron	Special Guest: Jang Sung-kyu	5.614%
154	November 17, 2018	Celeb Five		6.473%
155	November 24, 2018	Yoon Kyun-sang, Kim You-jung	Special Guest: Jang Sung-kyu	5.974%
156	December 1, 2018	Wanna One	Special Guest: Jang Sung-kyu	4.381%
157	December 8, 2018	EXID		5.207%
158	December 15, 2018	Kim Bum-soo, Gummy		4.952%
159	December 22, 2018	EXO (Except: Lay)	Special Guest: Shindong (Super Junior)	5.086%
160	December 29, 2018	No guests	End Of The Year Special; Special Guests: Jang Sung-kyu, Shindong (Super Junior), Norazo; Special video appearances by Uhm Jung-hwa, IU, Moon Se-yoon	4.202%

== 2019 ==
In the table below, the blue numbers represent the lowest ratings and the red numbers represent the highest ratings.

List of episodes in 2019 (episode 161–211)

Ep. #	Air Date	Guest(s)	Remarks	AGB Nielsen Ratings
161	January 5, 2019	Park Sung-woong, Ra Mi-ran, Jinyoung (B1A4)		6.679%
162	January 12, 2019	Hwang Kwang-hee (ZE:A), P.O (Block B)		6.441%
163	January 19, 2019	Lee Yoo-ri	Special Guest: Jang Sung-kyu	6.257%
164	January 26, 2019	Don Spike, Sam Hammington, Moon Hee-joon (H.O.T), Tae Hang-ho		6.767%
165	February 2, 2019	Don Spike, Sam Hammington, Tae Hang-ho, Park Mi-sun, Yoon Jung-soo, Hong Hyun-hee, Hong Yoon-hwa	Seollal Special; Special Guest: Jang Sung-kyu	6.127%
166	February 9, 2019	Kim Seo-hyung, Oh Na-ra	Special Guest: Kim Hye-yoon	9.585%
167	February 16, 2019	Lee Beom-soo, Rain		6.047%
168	February 23, 2019	Koyote		6.541%
169	March 2, 2019	Brave HongCha (Hong Kyung-min, Cha Tae-hyun), Samuel	Special Guest: Jang Sung-kyu	5.399%
170	March 9, 2019	Kim Bo-sung, Kim Soo-yong	Special Guest: Jang Sung-kyu	5.096%
171	March 16, 2019	Hyungdon and Daejun (Defconn, Jeong Hyeong-don)	Special Guest: Jang Sung-kyu	5.688%
172	March 23, 2019	In Gyo-jin, So Yi-hyun		5.756%
173	March 30, 2019	Lee Hee-jin, Hyomin (T-ara), Seunghee (Oh My Girl), Sejeong (Gugudan)	Special Guest: Jang Sung-kyu	4.903%
174	April 6, 2019	Norazo, UV		4.151%
175	April 13, 2019	Choi Soo-jong, Uee		5.056%
176	April 20, 2019	Mamamoo		3.924%
177	April 27, 2019	Kim Wan-sun, Bada (S.E.S.), Soyou, Kei (Lovelyz)		4.428%
178	May 4, 2019	IZ*ONE		4.205%
179	May 11, 2019	Jeong Young-ju, Go Jun, Ahn Chang-hwan		5.846%
180	May 18, 2019	Davichi, Jang Sung-kyu		4.676%
181	May 25, 2019	Kyuhyun (Super Junior), Jung Eun-ji (Apink)		5.224%
182	June 1, 2019	Jang Hyun-sung, Lee Jun-hyeok, Namkoong Min		5.532%
183	June 8, 2019	AKMU, Jeon Somi		5.972%
184	June 15, 2019	Im Won-hee, Lee Elijah, Kim Dong-jun (ZE:A)		5.279%
185	June 22, 2019	Jang Yoon-jeong, Kim Hwan		6.675%
186	June 29, 2019	Jun Hyun-moo, Kang Ji-young		7.231%
187	July 6, 2019	No guests	Special EP: "Brother School First Field Trip"	5.804%
188	July 13, 2019	ITZY	Special EP: "Brother School First Field Trip"	4.308%
189	July 20, 2019	Yang Joon-hyuk, Lee Bong-ju, Jin Jong-oh		5.735%
190	July 27, 2019	Jo Jung-suk, Yoona (Girls' Generation)		5.696%
191	August 3, 2019	Jeong Jun-ha, Lee Ji-hoon, Tei		4.580%
192	August 10, 2019	Seventeen	Special Guest: Kim Hwan	3.726%
193	August 17, 2019	Hwang Je-sung, Lee Yong-jin, Lee Jin-ho	Special Guest: Jang Sung-kyu	4.332%
194	August 24, 2019	Lee Yeon-bok, Kang Hyung-wook		5.072%
195	August 31, 2019	Park Ho-san, Gong Seung-yeon, Kim Min-jae, Park Ji-hoon		3.973%
196	September 7, 2019	Jang Yoon-ju, Irene Kim, Joy (Red Velvet)		4.413%
197	September 21, 2019	Pak Se-ri, Lee Sang-hwa		5.517%
198	September 28, 2019	Pak Se-ri, Lee Sang-hwa, Lee Man-ki, Park Mi-sun, Chae Yeon, Jang Young-ran, Shin Bong-sun, Lee Jin-ho, Lee Yi-kyung, Jin Ah-reum, Hyelin (EXID), Hyojung (Oh My Girl), NCT (Taeyong, Jaehyun), JooE (Momoland)	Autumn Sports Festival Special; Special Guest: Jang Sung-kyu	4.942%
199	October 5, 2019	Baek Ji-young, g.o.d (Son Ho-young, Kim Tae-woo)		4.770%
200	October 12, 2019	Super Junior	Special Guest: Kim Hwan; Kim Hee-chul appeared as a transfer student	5.115%
201	October 19, 2019	Celeb Five	Special Guest: Kim Hwan	5.399%
202	October 26, 2019	Brown Eyed Girls	Special Guest: Kim Hwan	4.824%
203	November 2, 2019	Kwon Sang-woo, Kim Hee-won, Kim Sung-kyun, Heo Sung-tae	Special Guest: Shindong (Super Junior)	6.349%
204	November 9, 2019	Hyuna, Dawn	Special Guest: Shindong (Super Junior); Special appearances by Pengsoo, Hwang Kwang-hee	4.135%
205	November 16, 2019	Lee So-ra, DinDin	Special appearances by Shindong (Super Junior), Pengsoo, Hwang Kwang-hee	5.729%
206	November 23, 2019	AOA	Special Guest: Shindong (Super Junior); Special appearances by Pengsoo, Hwang Kwang-hee	3.533%
207	November 30, 2019	Park Jin-young, Twice (Nayeon, Dahyun)	Special Guest: Shindong (Super Junior)	6.929%
208	December 7, 2019	EXO (Suho, Baekhyun, Chen, Chanyeol, Kai, Sehun)	Special Guest: Shindong (Super Junior); Start of "Job Consultation Room"; Job Consultation Room: Jang Sung-kyu, Shindong (Super Junior), Jeong Se-woon, Lee Seung-yoon, Copychu	4.994%
209	December 14, 2019	Ji Suk-jin, Park Jung-ah	Special Guest: Shindong (Super Junior); Job Consultation Room: Jang Sung-kyu, Shindong (Super Junior), Jeong Se-woon, Lee Seung-yoon, Copychu	4.556%
210	December 21, 2019	Lee Dong-gook, Lee Si-an	Special Guest: Shindong (Super Junior); Job Consultation Room: Jang Sung-kyu, Shindong (Super Junior), Jeong Se-woon, Lee Seung-yoon, Copychu	4.992%
211	December 28, 2019	No guests	End of School Term Ceremony: 2019 Knowing Bros Awards; Special Guests: Jang Sung-kyu, Shindong (Super Junior), Oh Na-ra; Special video appearances by Jo Jung-suk, Yoona (Girls' Generation), Hwang Je-sung, Lee Yong-jin, Lee Jin-ho, Celeb Five, Jun Hyun-moo, Kim Seo-hyung	4.068%

== 2020 ==
In the table below, the blue numbers represent the lowest ratings and the red numbers represent the highest ratings.

List of episodes in 2020 (episode 212–261)

Ep. #	Air Date	Guest(s)	Remarks	AGB Nielsen Ratings
212	January 4, 2020	Kim Hye-yoon, SF9 (Rowoon, Chani), Bona (Cosmic Girls), Kim Kang-hoon	Special Guest: Shindong (Super Junior); Job Consultation Room: Jang Sung-kyu, Shindong (Super Junior), Jeong Se-woon, (G)I-DLE (Soojin, Yuqi, Shuhua)	5.866%
213	January 11, 2020	Kim Sung-oh, Ahn Jae-hong, Kang So-ra, Jeon Yeo-been	Special Guest: Shindong (Super Junior); Job Consultation Room: Jang Sung-kyu, Shindong (Super Junior), Jeong Se-woon, (G)I-DLE (Soojin, Yuqi, Shuhua)	4.536%
214	January 18, 2020	Bae Jung-nam, Choi Yeo-jin	Special Guest: Shindong (Super Junior); Job Consultation Room: Jang Sung-kyu, Shindong (Super Junior), Jeong Se-woon, (G)I-DLE (Soojin, Yuqi, Shuhua)	4.251%
215	February 1, 2020	Jin Seo-yeon, Sooyoung (Girls' Generation)	Special Guest: Shindong (Super Junior); Job Consultation Room: Jang Sung-kyu, Shindong (Super Junior), Jeong Se-woon, Sleepy	3.266%
216	February 8, 2020	Kangnam, Lee Yi-kyung, Kim Sung-kyu (Infinite)	Special Guest: Eunhyuk (Super Junior); Job Consultation Room: Jang Sung-kyu, Shindong (Super Junior), Jeong Se-woon, Sleepy	3.721%
217	February 15, 2020	Han Hye-yeon, Heo Ji-woong	Special Guest: Shindong (Super Junior); Job Consultation Room: Jang Sung-kyu, Shindong (Super Junior), Jeong Se-woon, GFriend	3.910%
218	February 22, 2020	Bae Jong-ok, Shin Hye-sun	Special Guest: Shindong (Super Junior), Jeong Se-woon; Job Consultation Room: Jang Sung-kyu, Shindong (Super Junior), Jeong Se-woon, GFriend	5.015%
219	February 29, 2020	Hur Jae, Lee Hyung-taik, Kim Byung-hyun	Special Guest: Shindong (Super Junior); Job Consultation Room: Jang Sung-kyu, Shindong (Super Junior), Jeong Se-woon, GFriend	6.817%
220	March 7, 2020	Kim Sung-ryung, Park Shin-hye, Jeon Jong-seo	Special Guest: Shindong (Super Junior)	6.252%
221	March 14, 2020	Song Ji-hyo, Kim Mu-yeol	Special Guest: Shindong (Super Junior)	5.555%
222	March 21, 2020	Kim Hee-won, Kwak Do-won, Kim Dae-myung	Special Guest: Shindong (Super Junior)	6.167%
223	March 28, 2020	Kim Jun-hyun, Hong Hyun-hee, Ravi (VIXX), Seungkwan (Seventeen)	Special Guest: Shindong (Super Junior)	5.905%
224	April 4, 2020	Wooyoung (2PM), Jo Kwon (2AM), Mino (Winner), P.O (Block B)	Special Guest: Shindong (Super Junior)	5.982%
225	April 11, 2020	Song Ga-in, Hong Ja	Special Guest: Shindong (Super Junior)	8.371%
226	April 18, 2020	Song Eun-i, Lee Ji-hye, Narsha (Brown Eyed Girls), YOYOMI, Loona (Yves, Chuu, Heejin)	Special Guest: Shindong (Super Junior)	6.064%
227	April 25, 2020	Oh My Girl	Special Guest: Shindong (Super Junior)	5.008%
228	May 2, 2020	Kim Tae-yeon, Na Ha-eun, Hong Jam-eon, Hong Hwa-cheol	Special Guest: Shindong (Super Junior)	7.925%
229	May 9, 2020	Lim Young-woong, Young Tak, Lee Chan-won, Kim Ho-joong, Jung Dong-won, Jang Minho, Kim Hee-jae	Special Guest: Shindong (Super Junior) (ep.230,231), Kim Shin-young (ep.231)	15.523%
230	May 16, 2020	Lim Young-woong, Young Tak, Lee Chan-won, Kim Ho-joong, Jung Dong-won, Jang Minho, Kim Hee-jae	Special Guest: Shindong (Super Junior) (ep.230,231), Kim Shin-young (ep.231)	15.267%
231	May 23, 2020	Lim Young-woong, Young Tak, Lee Chan-won, Kim Ho-joong, Jung Dong-won, Jang Minho, Kim Hee-jae	Special Guest: Shindong (Super Junior) (ep.230,231), Kim Shin-young (ep.231)	14.711%
232	May 30, 2020	Park Ha-na, Ahn Bo-hyun, Lee Hak-joo	Special Guest: Shindong (Super Junior)	6.082%
233	June 6, 2020	Ahn Hyun-mo, Shin A-young, Kim Min-ah	Special Guest: Shindong (Super Junior)	6.509%
234	June 13, 2020	Son Dam-bi, Jung Chan-sung, Lim Seul-ong (2AM)	Special Guests: Shindong (Super Junior), Cherry B	6.415%
235	June 20, 2020	Lee Yoo-ri, Lee Bong-geun	Special Guest: Shindong (Super Junior)	5.019%
236	June 27, 2020	Oh Man-seok, Kim Jun-ho, Park Young-jin	Special Guests: Shindong (Super Junior), Copychu	4.992%
237	July 4, 2020	Kim Min-jun, Song Jong-ho, Son Ho-jun, Koo Ja-sung	Special Guest: Shindong (Super Junior)	5.225%
238	July 11, 2020	Sunmi, Zico (Block B), Monsta X (Shownu, Joohoney)	Special Guest: Shindong (Super Junior); Start of new mini segment "After School Activities"; After School Activities (Dong Dong Shin Ki) <Kang Ho-dong, Shindong (Super Junior)>	3.934%
239	July 18, 2020	Kim Yeon-koung	Special Guest: Shindong (Super Junior); After School Activities (Dong Dong Shin Ki): Kim Jong-min (Koyote), EXO-SC	6.453%
240	July 25, 2020	Sung Si-kyung, BoA	Special Guest: Shindong (Super Junior); After School Activities (Dong Dong Shin Ki): Red Velvet - Irene & Seulgi	5.287%
241	August 1, 2020	Kim Soo-mi, Tak Jae-hoon	Special Guest: Shindong (Super Junior); After School Activities (Dong Dong Shin Ki): Red Velvet - Irene & Seulgi, Kim Jong-kook, Oh My Girl (Mimi, Seunghee), Winner (Mino, Seungyoon)	6.537%
242	August 8, 2020	Uhm Jung-hwa, Park Sung-woong, Lee Sang-yoon, Lee Sun-bin	Special Guest: Shindong (Super Junior); After School Activities (Dong Dong Shin Ki): Wooyoung (2PM), Bang Chan (Stray Kids)	5.521%
243	August 15, 2020	Lee Joon, Jung Yong-hwa (CNBLUE), Lee Jin-hyuk (UP10TION), Jeong Se-woon	Special Guest: Shindong (Super Junior); After School Activities (Dong Dong Shin Ki): Wooyoung (2PM), Bang Chan (Stray Kids), Super Junior-D&E, Jessi, Nichkhun (2PM)	4.800%
244	August 22, 2020	Park Joon-hyung, Kim Ji-hye, Ham So-won, Jin Hua	Special Guest: Shindong (Super Junior), Park Hye-yi, Ham-Jin Mama; After School Activities (Dong Dong Shin Ki): Na Ha-eun	7.200%
245	August 29, 2020	SuperM	Special Guest: Shindong (Super Junior); After School Activities (Dong Dong Shin Ki): Kai (EXO), Taeyong (NCT)	4.042%
246	September 5, 2020	Kim Ha-neul, Yoon Sang-hyun, Lee Do-hyun	Special Guest: Shindong (Super Junior); After School Activities (Dong Dong Shin Ki): SuperM, Hyoyeon (Girls' Generation), Block B (Park Kyung, P.O)	5.197%
247	September 12, 2020	Ko Kyung-pyo, Seohyun (Girls' Generation)	Special Guest: Shindong (Super Junior); After School Activities (Dong Dong Shin Ki): (G)I-DLE (Soojin, Yuqi)	4.656%
248	September 19, 2020	Oh Yoon-ah, Lee Cho-hee, Lee Sang-yi, Ki Do-hoon	Special Guest: Shindong (Super Junior); After School Activities (Dong Dong Shin Ki): (G)I-DLE (Miyeon, Soojin, Soyeon, Yuqi), Ha Sung-woon (Hotshot), Seohyun (Girls' Generation)	6.218%
249	September 26, 2020	Hwang Shin-hye, Jeon In-hwa	Special Guest: Shindong (Super Junior); After School Activities (Dong Dong Shin Ki): Kim Ji-hoon, Super Junior-D&E	5.597%
250	October 10, 2020	Im Chang-jung, Capsai Shin (Shin Bong-sun), Jessi	Special Guest: Shindong (Super Junior); After School Activities (Dong Dong Shin Ki): Super Junior-D&E, Super Junior-K.R.Y., GFriend (Yerin, SinB)	5.534%
251	October 17, 2020	Blackpink	Special Guest: Shindong (Super Junior); After School Activities (Dong Dong Shin Ki): IZ*ONE (Kwon Eun-bi, Choi Ye-na, Jang Won-young)	4.769%
252	October 24, 2020	Seventeen	Special Guest: Shindong (Super Junior); After School Activities (Dong Dong Shin Ki): IZ*ONE	3.119%
253	October 31, 2020	Lovelyz (Jisoo, Mijoo), GFriend (Eunha, Umji), April (Yoon Chae-kyung, Lee Na-eun), Cosmic Girls (Soobin, Dayoung), Momoland (JooE, Nancy), Weki Meki (Choi Yoo-jung, Kim Do-yeon), (G)I-DLE (Miyeon, Yuqi)	Special EP: "1st Brother School Girl Group Battle"; Special Guest: Shindong (Super Junior); After School Activities (Universe Hipsters) <Kim Hee-chul, Min Kyung-hoon>: Lee Young-ji	3.696%
254	November 7, 2020	Hong Hyun-hee, Kang Jae-joon, Lee Eun-hyung, Jason	Special Guest: Shindong (Super Junior); After School Activities (Universe Hipsters): Lee Young-ji	5.244%
255	November 14, 2020	Kim Seung-woo, Lee Tae-ran, Go Soo-hee	Special Guest: Shindong (Super Junior); After School Activities (Universe Hipsters): DinDin	4.974%
256	November 21, 2020	Hong Sung-heon, Kim Kwang-hyun	Special Guest: Shindong (Super Junior); After School Activities (Universe Hipsters): DinDin	4.506%
257	November 28, 2020	Yoo Jun-sang, Jo Byung-gyu, Sejeong (Gugudan)	Special Guest: Shindong (Super Junior), Lee So-ri; After School Activities (Universe Hipsters): Swings, DinDin, Kid Milli, Park Dae-hee	4.519%
258	December 5, 2020	Yuri (Girls' Generation), Park So-dam, Chae Soo-bin	Special Guest: Shindong (Super Junior), Lee Soon-jae, Shin Goo; After School Activities (Universe Hipsters): Swings, DinDin, Kid Milli	4.718%
259	December 12, 2020	Super Junior (Except: Leeteuk)	After School Activities (Universe Hipsters): DinDin, BIBI; Kim Hee-chul appeared as a transfer student Seo Jang-hoon is absent due to self-quarantine	4.624%
260	December 19, 2020	Ji Chang-wook, Kim Min-seok, Ryu Kyung-soo	Special Guest: Shindong (Super Junior); After School Activities (Universe Hipsters): DinDin, BIBI	4.173%
261	December 26, 2020	Weki Meki	End of School Term Ceremony: 2020 Knowing Bros Awards; Special Guests: Jang Sung-kyu, Shindong (Super Junior), Bibi, Kim Tae-woo (g.o.d), Park Jin-joo, Pengsoo; Special video appearances by Jeon In-hwa, Lee Sang-yi, Kim Soo-mi, Lee Yeon-bok, Hong Seok-cheon, Jang Dong-min, Leeteuk (Super Junior), Tak Jae-hoon, Kim Yeon-koung, Mijoo (Lovelyz), Kwak Do-won, Park Sung-woong; After School Activities (Universe Hipsters): DinDin, BIBI, Shindong (Super Junior), Ateez	4.219%

== 2021 ==
In the table below, the blue numbers represent the lowest ratings and the red numbers represent the highest ratings.

List of episodes in 2021 (episode 262–312)

Ep. #	Air Date	Guest(s)	Remarks	AGB Nielsen Ratings
262	January 2, 2021	Park Jin-young, Rain	Special Guest: Shindong (Super Junior); After School Activities (Universe Hipsters): MFBTY, Swings, Kid Milli	7.175%
263	January 9, 2021	Moon So-ri, Kim Sun-young, Jang Yoon-ju	Special Guest: Shindong (Super Junior); Kim Young-chul is absent due to self-quarantine (appeared through video call)	5.668%
264	January 16, 2021	U-Know Yunho (TVXQ), DinDin	Special Guests: Shindong (Super Junior), Kasper, Choi Jung-seob; After School Activities (Lots of Advice) <Lee Soo-geun, Seo Jang-hoon>: NCT (Jungwoo, Jeno, Chenle)	4.199%
265	January 23, 2021	Park Joon-myeon, Ivy, Joo Won	Special Guest: Park Young-jin; After School Activities (Lots of Advice): NCT (Jungwoo, Jeno, Chenle)	4.058%
266	January 30, 2021	Choi Kang-hee, Eum Moon-suk, Kim Young-kwang	Special Guests: Shindong (Super Junior), Lee Re; After School Activities (Lots of Advice): NCT (Jungwoo, Jeno, Chenle)	4.481%
267	February 6, 2021	Kim Eung-soo, Lee Jin-ho	Special Guests: Shindong (Super Junior), Park Young-jin; After School Activities (Lots of Advice): Monsta X (Minhyuk, Hyungwon, Joohoney)	4.513%
268	February 20, 2021	Shinee	Special Guest: Shindong (Super Junior); After School Activities (Lots of Advice): Monsta X (Minhyuk, Hyungwon, Joohoney)	3.008%
269	February 27, 2021	Lee Seung-yoon, Jung Hong-il, Lee Mu-jin, Sojung (Ladies' Code)	Special Guest: Shindong (Super Junior); After School Activities (Lots of Advice): No guests	4.609%
270	March 6, 2021	Do Kyung-wan, Tiffany Young (Girls' Generation)	Special Guest: Shindong (Super Junior); After School Activities (Lots of Advice): No guests	4.389%
271	March 13, 2021	Kim Dae-hee, Jang Dong-min, Yoo Sang-moo	Special Guest: Shindong (Super Junior); After School Activities (Lots of Advice): Lee Yong-jin, Lee Jin-ho	3.664%
272	March 20, 2021	Hyeri (Girl's Day), Rosé (Blackpink)	Special Guest: Shindong (Super Junior); After School Activities (Lots of Advice): Lee Yong-jin, Lee Jin-ho	3.661%
273	March 27, 2021	Yang Ji-eun, Hong Ji-yun, Kim Da-hyun, Kim Tae-yeon, Kim Eui-young, Byeol Sa-rang, Eun Ga-eun	Special Guest: Shindong (Super Junior); After School Activities (Lots of Advice): Lee Yong-jin, Lee Jin-ho	5.322%
274	April 3, 2021	Brave Girls	Special Guest: Shindong (Super Junior); After School Activities (Lots of Advice): Apink (Yoon Bo-mi, Oh Ha-young)	3.772%
275	April 10, 2021	Choi Yang-rak, Paeng Hyun-sook	Special Guest: Shindong (Super Junior); After School Activities (Lots of Advice): Apink (Yoon Bo-mi, Oh Ha-young)	4.880%
276	April 17, 2021	Jang Ye-won, Lee Hye-sung, Astro (Cha Eun-woo, Moonbin)	Special Guest: Shindong (Super Junior); After School Activities (Lots of Advice): Apink (Yoon Bo-mi, Oh Ha-young)	4.108%
277	April 24, 2021	Highlight	Special Guest: Shindong (Super Junior)	2.966%
278	May 1, 2021	ITZY	Special Guest: Shindong (Super Junior)	2.411%
279	May 8, 2021	No guests	Special EP: "Knowing Bros Children's Song Project for Children's Day"; Special Guests: Shindong (Super Junior), Lyuh Esther, Highlight	3.283%
280	May 15, 2021	Hyun Young, Lee Soo-young, Ayumi	Special Guests: Shindong (Super Junior), Kim Shin-young	3.691%
281	May 22, 2021	Swings, Lee Hong-gi (F.T. Island), Heize	Special Guest: Shindong (Super Junior)	3.925%
282	May 29, 2021	Aespa	Special EP: "Bros High School Dormitory"; Special Guests: Shindong (Super Junior), Defconn, Lee Hye-jung	3.006%
283	June 5, 2021	Aespa	Special EP: "Bros High School Dormitory"; Special Guests: Shindong (Super Junior), Defconn	2.497%
284	June 12, 2021	Chae Jung-an, Kim Ji-seok, Jung So-min	Special Guest: Shindong (Super Junior); Kim Hee-chul is absent	3.702%
285	June 19, 2021	Kim Ki-bang, Tae Hang-ho, Lee Ho-cheol	Special Guest: Shindong (Super Junior)	3.399%
286	June 26, 2021	Go Doo-shim, Ji Hyun-woo	Special Guest: Shindong (Super Junior)	3.448%
287	July 3, 2021	2PM	Special Guest: Shindong (Super Junior)	4.338%
288	July 10, 2021	T-ara	Special Guests: Shindong (Super Junior), Lee Jin-ho; Kim Young-chul is absent	3.915%
289	July 17, 2021	Shinhwa (Jun Jin, Andy), Baby V.O.X (Kan Mi-youn, Yoon Eun-hye)	Special Guests: Shindong (Super Junior), Ha Sung-woon; Kim Young-chul is absent	4.175%
290	July 24, 2021	Seol Woon-do, Lee Kyung-sil, Jo Hye-ryun	Special Guests: Shindong (Super Junior), Hong Hyun-hee; Kim Young-chul is absent	3.593%
291	July 31, 2021	Park Jun-gyu, Park Dong-bin, Ahn Jae-mo, Lee Jin-ho	Special Guest: Shindong (Super Junior), Jang Se-jin	3.586%
292	August 7, 2021	Kim Jung-min, KCM	Special Guest: Shindong (Super Junior)	3.661%
293	August 14, 2021	Kim Jung-hwan, Gu Bon-gil, Kim Jun-ho, Oh Sang-uk		6.578%
294	August 21, 2021	Kim Jung-hwan, Gu Bon-gil, Kim Jun-ho, Oh Sang-uk	Special Guest: Shindong (Super Junior)	5.644%
295	August 28, 2021	Jeong Jun-ha, CL	Special Guest: Shindong (Super Junior)	3.990%
296	September 4, 2021	Oh Jong-hyuk, Choi Young-jae, Park Goon	Special Guest: Shindong (Super Junior)	3.589%
297	September 11, 2021	Lee Hyun-yi, Irene Kim, Jung Hyuk	Special Guest: Shindong (Super Junior)	1.949%
298	September 18, 2021	Simon Dominic, Gray, Code Kunst, Lee Hi	Special Guest: Shindong (Super Junior)	2.046%
299	September 25, 2021	Park Jeong-min, Yoona (Girls' Generation)	Special Guest: Shindong (Super Junior)	2.647%
300	October 2, 2021	Young Tak, Lee Chan-won, Super Junior-D&E		2.976%
301	October 9, 2021	Young Tak, Lee Chan-won, Super Junior-D&E	Special Guest: Shindong (Super Junior)	2.586%
302	October 16, 2021	Choi Ye-bin, Jin Ji-hee, Kim Hyun-soo	Special Guest: Shindong (Super Junior), Kim So-yeon (via phone)	2.531%
303	October 23, 2021	Aespa	Special Guest: Shindong (Super Junior)	1.943%
304	October 30, 2021	Kim Yong-myung, Heo Kyung-hwan, Kim Doo-young, Park Young-jin, Kang Jae-jun, Lee Eun-hyung	Lee Jin-ho joins the regular cast lineup beginning this episode Special Guest: Shindong (Super Junior)	2.384%
305	November 6, 2021	Kim Byung-ji, Choi Jin-cheul, Lee Chun-soo	Special Guest: Shindong (Super Junior)	2.305%
306	November 13, 2021	Jang Dong-min, Ock Joo-hyun, Tei, Joo Woo-jae, Xiumin (EXO), Seolhyun (AOA), Lee Jang-jun (Golden Child), Dayoung (Cosmic Girls)	Special EP: "Bros High School Festival"; Special Guest: Shindong (Super Junior), 2AM	2.302%
307	November 20, 2021	Monika, Honey J, Aiki, Rihey, Hyojin Choi, Gabee, no:ze, Leejung Lee	Special Guest: Yoon Bo-ra	3.540%
308	November 27, 2021	Monika, Honey J, Aiki, Rihey, Hyojin Choi, Gabee, no:ze, Leejung Lee	Special Guest: Shindong (Super Junior)	2.788%
309	December 4, 2021	Lee Seung-gi, Kai (EXO)	Special Guest: Defconn	3.000%
310	December 11, 2021	Lee Jong-beom, Lee Jung-hoo	Special Guest: Shindong (Super Junior)	3.815%
311	December 18, 2021	Jaejae, Bibi, Choi Ye-na	Special Guest: Defconn, Song Hyung-seok, Kim Doo-young	2.255%
312	December 25, 2021	Jung In, Ailee, Jung Dong-won	End of School Term Ceremony: 2021 Knowing Bros Awards + Christmas Special; Special Guest: Shindong (Super Junior), Baek Da-hye; Special video appearances by Choi Yang-rak, Paeng Hyun-sook, Aiki, Kim Jung-hwan, Gu Bon-gil, Kim Jun-ho, Oh Sang-uk	2.809%

== 2022 ==
In the table below, the blue numbers represent the lowest ratings and the red numbers represent the highest ratings.

List of episodes in 2022 (episode 313–364)

Ep. #	Air Date	Guest(s)	Remarks	AGB Nielsen Ratings
313	January 1, 2022	Park Mi-sun, Hyun Young, Soyou, Maria Elizabeth Leise, IVE (Yujin, Wonyoung)	Special Guest: Shindong (Super Junior), IVE (Gaeul, Rei, Liz, Leeseo)	3.417%
314	January 8, 2022	Park Yong-woo, Yim Si-wan, Go Ah-sung	Special Guest: Shindong (Super Junior)	3.454%
315	January 15, 2022	2AM	Special Guest: Shindong (Super Junior)	3.905%
316	January 22, 2022	Kang Ye-won, Song Ji-a, Lee Young-ji	Special Guest: Shindong (Super Junior); Lee Soo-geun is absent due to self-quarantine	3.069%
317	January 29, 2022	2PM (Jun. K, Wooyoung), Monsta X (Minhyuk, Joohoney), Astro (Moonbin, Yoon San-ha), The Boyz (Juyeon, Q), Park Goon, Na Tae-joo	2022 Bros High School Lunar New Year Sports Competition; Special Guests: Super Junior (Leeteuk, Shindong), Baek Da-hye	3.502%
318	February 5, 2022	2PM (Jun. K, Wooyoung), Monsta X (Minhyuk, Joohoney), Astro (Moonbin, Yoon San-ha), The Boyz (Juyeon, Q), Park Goon, Na Tae-joo	2022 Knowing Bros Wrestling Competition; Special Guests: Super Junior (Leeteuk, Shindong), sEODo Band, Lee Jae-shin, Kim Jun-su	3.818%
319	February 12, 2022	Epik High	Special Guest: Shindong (Super Junior)	4.046%
320	February 19, 2022	Lee Se-young	Special Guest: Shindong (Super Junior)	5.181%
321	February 26, 2022	BtoB (Except: Seo Eun-kwang)	Special Guest: Shindong (Super Junior)	2.164%
322	March 5, 2022	Kwak Yoon-gy, Kim A-lang, Lee Yu-bin	Special Guest: Shindong (Super Junior); Min Kyung-hoon is absent due to self-quarantine	4.260%
323	March 12, 2022	Im Jae-hyuk, Ha Seung-ri, Yoo In-soo, Lee Eun-saem, Yoon Chan-young, Park Ji-hu	Special Guests: Shindong (Super Junior), Cho Yi-hyun	1.983%
324	March 19, 2022	Kim Ki-tae, Kim So-yeon, Yun Seong, Park Hyun-kyu, Shin You-me	Special Guests: Shindong (Super Junior), Wooyoung (2PM); Lee Soo-geun, Kim Young-chul, and Lee Jin-ho are absent	3.235%
325	March 26, 2022	Kahi, Park Jung-ah, Oh My Girl (Mimi, Seunghee)	Special Guests: Super Junior (Leeteuk, Shindong), Kim Shin-yong	2.322%
326	April 2, 2022	Jang Hye-jin, Choo Ja-hyun		2.467%
327	April 9, 2022	Kim Won-hyo, Shim Jin-hwa, Jung Kyung-mi, Yoon Hyung-bin	Special Guest: Shindong (Super Junior)	3.302%
328	April 16, 2022	Lee Seok-hoon (SG Wannabe), Song Ga-in	Special Guest: Shindong (Super Junior)	3.181%
329	April 23, 2022	Alberto Mondi, Guzal Tursunova, Kangnam, Fabien Yoon	Special Guests: Wooyoung (2PM), Jang Dong-min, Baek Da-hye; Kim Hee-chul is absent	3.333%
330	April 30, 2022	Psy	Special Guest: Shindong (Super Junior)	3.475%
331	May 7, 2022	Winner	Special Guest: Shindong (Super Junior)	2.235%
332	May 14, 2022	Kim Shin-young, Le Sserafim (Sakura Miyawaki, Kim Chaewon), Billlie (Moon Sua, Tsuki)	Special Guests: Shindong (Super Junior), Le Sserafim (Huh Yun-jin, Kazuha, Kim Ga-ram, Hong Eun-chae), Billlie (Suhyeon, Haram, Sheon, Siyoon, Haruna)	1.979%
333	May 21, 2022	Hur Jae, Heo Ung	Special Guest: Shindong (Super Junior)	2.356%
334	May 28, 2022	Seventeen (Jeonghan, Joshua, Jun, Hoshi, Mingyu, DK, The8, Seungkwan)	Special Guests: Super Junior (Leeteuk, Shindong); Kim Hee-chul is absent	1.983%
335	June 4, 2022	No guests	Special EP: "Bros High School Pep Rally"; Special Guest: Shindong (Super Junior)	2.356%
336	June 11, 2022	Heo Sung-tae, Lee Yoo-young, Kang Ha-neul	Special Guest: Shindong (Super Junior)	2.312%
337	June 18, 2022	Han Young, Lee Eun-hyung, Yang Hyo-jin	Special Guests: Shindong (Super Junior), Kang Jae-jun	3.114%
338	June 25, 2022	Kim Jong-min (Koyote), Heo Kyung-hwan, Park Young-jin, Sleepy, Ryeowook (Super Junior), Infinite (Kim Sung-kyu, Lee Sung-jong), Seo Eun-kwang (BtoB)	Special Guest: Shindong (Super Junior)	2.351%
339	July 2, 2022	Kim Jong-min (Koyote), Heo Kyung-hwan, Park Young-jin, Sleepy, Ryeowook (Super Junior), Infinite (Kim Sung-kyu, Lee Sung-jong), Seo Eun-kwang (BtoB)	Special Guest: Shindong (Super Junior)	2.642%
340	July 9, 2022	Young Tak, Ji Hyun-woo, Yoon Bo-mi (Apink)	Special Guest: Shindong (Super Junior), SGO	3.053%
341	July 16, 2022	Se7en, Kim Hee-jae, Chungha	Special Guest: Shindong (Super Junior)	2.550%
342	July 23, 2022	Lee Seung-yuop, Park Yong-taik, Shim Soo-chang, Yoo Hee-kwan	Special Guest: Shindong (Super Junior)	2.978%
343	July 30, 2022	Hwang Soo-kyung, Kang Soo-jung	Special Guest: Shindong (Super Junior)	3.626%
344	August 6, 2022	Zico (Block B), Itzy (Yeji, Chaeryeong, Yuna)	Special Guest: Shindong (Super Junior)	2.300%
345	August 13, 2022	Girls' Generation	Special Guest: Shindong (Super Junior)	3.451%
346	August 20, 2022	Girls' Generation	Special Guest: Shindong (Super Junior)	3.425%
347	August 27, 2022	Ive	Special Guest: Shindong (Super Junior)	2.419%
348	September 3, 2022	Park Hwi-soon, Oh Ji-heon, Kim Ji-ho	Special Guest: Min Hyo-jung	2.984%
349	September 10, 2022	Lee Su-ji, Chuu (Loona), Choi Ye-na	Special EP: "Chuseok Special - Brothers School Autumn Field Trip"; Special Guest: Shindong (Super Junior)	2.302%
350	September 17, 2022	Lee Su-ji, Chuu (Loona), Choi Ye-na	Special EP: "Chuseok Special - Brothers School Autumn Field Trip"; Special Guest: Shindong (Super Junior)	2.314%
351	September 24, 2022	Jung Sung-ho, Park Seul-gi, Yang Seung-won, Kim Bo-min	Special Guest: Shindong (Super Junior)	3.092%
352	October 1, 2022	Jaejae, Crush, Bibi	Special Guest: Shindong (Super Junior), Kim Bo-min, Yang Seung-won	2.620%
353	October 8, 2022	Mamamoo	Special Guest: Shindong (Super Junior)	2.435%
354	October 15, 2022	Han Moon-chul, Guillaume Patry, Han Bo-reum, Soobin (WJSN)	Special Guests: Shindong (Super Junior), Park Jin-young	2.697%
355	October 22, 2022	Manny Pacquiao, Lee Hoon, Yoon Hyung-bin, Sandara Park, Kim Yo-han (WEi)	Special Guest: Shindong (Super Junior)	2.845%
356	October 29, 2022	(G)I-dle	Special Guest: Shindong (Super Junior)	2.405%
357	November 12, 2022	Minho (Shinee), Chae Soo-bin	Special Guest: Shindong (Super Junior)	2.147%
358	November 19, 2022	Koyote	Special Guest: Shindong (Super Junior)	3.014%
359	November 26, 2022	Park Sung-hoon, Song Jin-woo, Kim So-eun, Lim Na-young	Special Guest: Shindong (Super Junior)	2.868%
360	December 3, 2022	Kara	Special Guest: Shindong (Super Junior)	2.599%
361	December 10, 2022	Yoon Shi-yoon, Lee Ho-won	Special Guest: Park Young-jin	3.161%
362	December 17, 2022	Kim Yeon-ja, F.T. Island (Lee Hong-gi, Lee Jae-jin)	Special Guest: Shindong (Super Junior)	2.937%
363	December 24, 2022	Super Junior		4.000%
364	December 31, 2022	Super Junior	End of School Term Ceremony: 2022 Knowing Bros Awards	1.890%

== 2023 ==
In the table below, the blue numbers represent the lowest ratings and the red numbers represent the highest ratings.

List of episodes in 2023 (episode 365–414)

Ep. #	Air Date	Guest(s)	Remarks	AGB Nielsen Ratings
365	January 7, 2023	Kim Do-hyun, Kim Nam-hee, Park Ji-hyun	Special Guests: Shindong (Super Junior), Kim Bo-min, Yang Seung-won	4.218%
366	January 14, 2023	Park Mi-sun, Jo Hye-ryun, Kim Ji-min, Hong Ji-yun, Oh My Girl (Mimi, YooA), Viviz (Eunha, SinB)	Special Guest: Shindong (Super Junior); Min Kyung-hoon is absent for these episodes	3.541%
367	January 21, 2023	Park Mi-sun, Jo Hye-ryun, Kim Ji-min, Hong Ji-yun, Oh My Girl (Mimi, YooA), Viviz (Eunha, SinB)	Special Guest: Shindong (Super Junior); Min Kyung-hoon is absent for these episodes	3.332%
368	January 28, 2023	Choi Yoon-young, Uhm Hyun-kyung, Han Bo-reum, Lee Joo-woo	Special Guest: Shindong (Super Junior)	3.008%
369	February 4, 2023	Lee Ji-hye, Jung Ju-ri, Kim Seung-hye, Jung Dong-won	Special Guest: Shindong (Super Junior), Lee Chan-won	3.712%
370	February 11, 2023	Lee Moon-sik, Shin Hyun-joon, Kim Min-kyung	Special Guest: Shindong (Super Junior); Lee Sang-min is absent	2.822%
371	February 18, 2023	Ko Chang-seok, Jin Seon-kyu, Jang Dong-joo, Sung Yoo-bin	Special Guest: Park Young-jin	2.425%
372	February 25, 2023	Syuka, Kim Gyeran, Shim Eu-ddeum, Tzuyang	Special Guest: Park Young-jin	2.825%
373	March 4, 2023	Kim Min-kyo, Jung Sang-hoon, Jung Yi-lang, Lee Su-ji, Kwon Hyuk-soo, Kim Ah-young, Joo Hyun-young		3.234%
374	March 11, 2023	Kim Min-kyo, Jung Sang-hoon, Jung Yi-lang, Lee Su-ji, Kwon Hyuk-soo, Kim Ah-young, Joo Hyun-young	Special Guest: Shindong (Super Junior)	2.940%
375	March 18, 2023	Bada, Sunye, Soyul	Special Guest: Shindong (Super Junior)	2.573%
376	March 25, 2023	Choo Sung-hoon, Yun Sung-bin	Special Guest: Shindong (Super Junior)	2.773%
377	April 1, 2023	Monsta X (Except: Shownu)	Special Guest: Shindong (Super Junior)	2.126%
378	April 8, 2023	Jang Hang-jun, Ahn Jae-hong, Jeong Jin-woon (2AM)	Special Guest: Shindong (Super Junior)	2.802%
379	April 15, 2023	Ive	Special Guest: Shindong (Super Junior)	2.090%
380	April 22, 2023	Nam Ho-yeon, Moon Se-yoon, Choe Seong-min, Hwang Je-sung	Special Guest: Shindong (Super Junior)	2.452%
381	April 29, 2023	Le Sserafim	Special Guest: Shindong (Super Junior)	2.800%
382	May 6, 2023	Jun Jin (Shinhwa), Kim Min-kyung, Kim Hye-seon, Oh Na-mi, Heo Min	Special Guest: Shindong (Super Junior)	3.817%
383	May 13, 2023	Chung Seung-je, Kim Min-jeong, Joo Hye-yeon	Special Guest: Shindong (Super Junior)	3.774%
384	May 20, 2023	Lee El, Park Hyo-joo, Jin Seo-yeon, Cha Ye-ryun	Special Guest: Shindong (Super Junior)	2.481%
385	May 27, 2023	Park So-hyun, Kim Tae-gyun, Lee Min-hyuk (BtoB)	Special Guest: Shindong (Super Junior); Kim Hee-chul is absent	3.383%
386	June 3, 2023	Johan Kim (Solid), Muzie, Jo Hyun-ah (Urban Zakapa), Miyeon ((G)I-dle)	Special Guest: Shindong (Super Junior)	2.338%
387	June 10, 2023	Aespa (Except: Giselle)	Special Guest: Shindong (Super Junior)	2.262%
388	June 17, 2023	Lee Deok-hwa, Lee Kyung-kyu, Kim Jun-hyun		3.138%
389	June 24, 2023	Lee Deok-hwa, Lee Kyung-kyu, Kim Jun-hyun	Special Guest: Shindong (Super Junior)	2.561%
390	July 1, 2023	No guests	Knowing Bros in Da Nang, Vietnam; Special Guest: Shindong (Super Junior)	3.083%
391	July 8, 2023	No guests	Knowing Bros in Da Nang, Vietnam; Special Guest: Shindong (Super Junior)	2.834%
392	July 15, 2023	No guests	Knowing Bros in Da Nang, Vietnam; Special Guest: Shindong (Super Junior)	3.212%
393	July 22, 2023	Hong Sung-woo, Han Sang-bo, Kim Young-sam	Special Guest: Shindong (Super Junior)	4.476%
394	July 29, 2023	Oh My Girl	Special Guest: Shindong (Super Junior)	2.300%
395	August 5, 2023	Itzy	Special Guest: Shindong (Super Junior)	2.095%
396	August 12, 2023	Infinite	Special Guest: Shindong (Super Junior)	1.873%
397	August 19, 2023	Jeon Somi, Kwon Eun-bi, STAYC	Special Guest: Shindong (Super Junior); Kim Young-chul is absent	1.861%
398	August 26, 2023	Kwon Il-yong, Pyo Chang-won, Park Ji-yoon, Jang Dong-min	Special Guest: Shindong (Super Junior)	2.524%
399	September 2, 2023	DinDin, BamBam (Got7), RalRal, Nana (Woo!ah!)	Special Guest: Shindong (Super Junior)	2.475%
400	September 9, 2023	No guests	400th Episode Special; Special Guests: Shindong (Super Junior), Libelante, Forténa, Hwasa (Mamamoo)	2.262%
401	September 16, 2023	Kim Soo-mi, Jeong Jun-ha, Yoon Hyun-min, Yura (Girl's Day)	Special Guest: Shindong (Super Junior)	3.269%
402	September 23, 2023	Park Mi-sun, Jo Hye-ryun, Shin Bong-sun, Kim Hye-seon, Yoo Hee-kwan, Mo Tae-bum, Yewon, Yerin, Jung You-in, Kep1er (Xiaoting, Kim Chae-hyun), Zerobaseone (Kim Ji-woong, Park Gun-wook)	Special EP: "Chuseok Special"; Special Guest: Shindong (Super Junior)	1.996%
403	September 30, 2023	Park Mi-sun, Jo Hye-ryun, Shin Bong-sun, Kim Hye-seon, Yoo Hee-kwan, Mo Tae-bum, Yewon, Yerin, Jung You-in, Kep1er (Xiaoting, Kim Chae-hyun), Zerobaseone (Kim Ji-woong, Park Gun-wook)	Special EP: "2023 Knowing Bros Wrestling Competition"; Special Guests: Shindong & Leeteuk (Super Junior)	2.741%
404	October 14, 2023	Kang Soo-jung, Son Jun-ho, Jo Jung-sik, Lee Na-yeon, Kim Jong-jin, Jeong Keun-woo, Han Suk-joon, Lee Seung-hyun	Special Guest: Shindong (Super Junior)	3.204%
405	October 21, 2023	Joon Park (g.o.d), Zerobaseone (Zhang Hao, Seok Matthew), Eddie (n.Ssign), Lee Ahyumi, Dita (Secret Number), Fatou (Blackswan), Tsuki (Billlie), Natty (Kiss of Life)	Special Guest: Hwang Soo-kyung	2.378%
406	October 28, 2023	Abhishek Gupta/Lucky, Christina Confalonieri, Alberto Mondi, Julian Quintart, Kris Johnson	Special Guest: Shindong (Super Junior)	3.101%
407	November 4, 2023	Kim Mi-ryeo, Lee Eun-hyung, Hur An-na, Hong Yun-hwa, Lim Lala	Special Guest: Shindong (Super Junior)	2.571%
408	November 11, 2023	Choi Ji-woo, P.O (Block B), Ha Da-in	Special Guest: Shindong (Super Junior)	2.666%
409	November 18, 2023	Jay Park, Jung Chan-sung	Special Guest: Shindong (Super Junior)	2.079%
410	November 25, 2023	Aespa	Special Guests: Super Junior (Leeteuk, Shindong)	1.634%
411	December 2, 2023	Lia Kim, Halo, Mina Myoung, Funky-Y, Nob, Bada Lee	Special Guest: Shindong (Super Junior)	1.605%
412	December 9, 2023	Park Ki-young, Big Mama, Ailee, Parc Jae-jung, Lee Mu-jin	Special Guest: Shindong (Super Junior)	2.799%
413	December 16, 2023	Kim Shin-young, Shim Jin-hwa, Kim Ki-wook, Hwang Young-jin	Special Guest: Shindong (Super Junior)	3.179%
414	December 23, 2023	Shownu (Monsta X), Jeong Se-woon, Cravity (Minhee, Hyeongjun), Ive (Rei, Liz, Leeseo)	2023 End of School Term Ceremony: 2023 Knowing Bros Awards; Special Guest: Shindong (Super Junior)	2.056%

== 2024 ==
In the table below, the blue numbers represent the lowest ratings and the red numbers represent the highest ratings.

List of episodes in 2024 (episode 415–463)

Ep. #	Air Date	Guest(s)	Remarks	AGB Nielsen Ratings
415	January 6, 2024	Namkoong Min, Ahn Eun-jin	Special Guest: Shindong (Super Junior)	3.461%
416	January 13, 2024	TVXQ	Special Guest: Shindong (Super Junior)	2.113%
417	January 20, 2024	Kyuhyun (Super Junior), Sistar19	Special Guest: Shindong (Super Junior)	1.423%
418	January 27, 2024	T1 League of Legends (Choi Woo-je (Zeus), Moon Hyeon-joon (Oner), Lee Sang-hyeok (Faker), Lee Min-hyung (Gumayusi), Ryu Min-seok (Keria))	Special Guest: Shindong (Super Junior)	1.924%
419	February 3, 2024	(G)I-dle	Special Guest: Shindong (Super Junior)	1.516%
420	February 10, 2024	Park Mi-sun, Jo Hye-ryun, Yoon Ga-i, H1-Key	Special Guest: Shindong (Super Junior)	1.906%
421	February 17, 2024	Issac Hong, So Soo-bin, EJel, Shin Hae-sol, Leejean, Kang Seong-hee, Chu Seung-yeob	Special Guest: Shindong (Super Junior)	2.538%
422	February 24, 2024	Shin Gi-ru, Choi Joon-suk, Pungja, Na Sun-uk	Special Guest: Shindong (Super Junior)	2.619%
423	March 2, 2024	Kim Seung-jin, Lee Chang-ho, Shin Kyu-jin, Lee Eun-ji	Special Guest: Shindong (Super Junior)	2.414%
424	March 9, 2024	Kim Bum-soo, KCM	Special Guest: Cho Jung-sik; Kim Hee-chul is absent for this episode	2.012%
425	March 16, 2024	Song Ha-yoon, Lee Gi-kwang (Highlight)	Special Guest: Shindong (Super Junior)	1.656%
426	March 23, 2024	Choi Soo-jong, Jeong Ho-bin, Yoon Bok-in	Special Guest: Shindong (Super Junior)	2.258%
427	March 30, 2024	Baek Ji-young, Muzie	Special Guest: Shindong (Super Junior)	1.874%
428	April 6, 2024	Lyn, Park Hye-sin, Ma I-jin, Jeon Yu-jin	Special Guest: Shindong (Super Junior)	2.665%
429	April 13, 2024	Babymonster	Special Guest: Shindong (Super Junior)	1.266%
430	April 20, 2024	Cho Jun-ho, Cho Jun-hyun, Jonathan Yiombi, Patricia Yiombi	Special Guest: Shindong (Super Junior)	1.581%
431	April 27, 2024	Apink	Special Guest: Shindong (Super Junior)	1.002%
432	May 4, 2024	Insooni, Park Mi-kyung, Shin Hyo-bum, Lee Eun-mi	Special Guest: Shindong (Super Junior)	1.868%
433	May 11, 2024	Chon Tae-poong, Julien Kang, Andre Jin Coquillard	Special Guest: Shindong (Super Junior)	2.404%
434	May 18, 2024	Jang Young-ran, Park Seul-gi, Eom Ji-yoon, Haewon (Nmixx)	Special Guest: Shindong (Super Junior)	2.063%
435	May 25, 2024	Illit	Special Guest: Shindong (Super Junior)	1.465%
436	June 1, 2024	Roh Jeong-eui, Lee Chae-min, Kim Jae-won, Ji Hye-won, Lee Won-jung	Special Guest: Shindong (Super Junior)	1.789%
437	June 8, 2024	Lee In-chul, Park Min-chul, Suh Ah-ram	Special Guest: Shindong (Super Junior)	2.977%
438	June 15, 2024	Lee Jung-eun, Choi Jin-hyuk, Jung Eun-ji (Apink)	Special Guest: Shindong (Super Junior)	2.371%
439	June 22, 2024	Day6	Special Guest: Shindong (Super Junior)	2.262%
440	June 29, 2024	Jung Yi-lang, Ji Ye-eun, Kim Ah-young, Yoon Ga-i	Special Guest: Shindong (Super Junior)	2.516%
441	July 6, 2024	No guests	Knowing Bros in Saipan; Special Guest: Shindong (Super Junior); Lee Sang-min is absent for Episodes 441-442	1.853%
442	July 13, 2024	No guests	Knowing Bros in Saipan; Special Guest: Shindong (Super Junior); Lee Sang-min is absent for Episodes 441-442	2.017%
443	July 20, 2024	No guests	Knowing Bros in Saipan; Special Guest: Shindong (Super Junior); Lee Sang-min is absent for Episodes 441-442	1.715%
444	July 27, 2024	Kim Ji-yoon, Chang Dong-seon, Kwak Jae-sik	Beginning this episode, Shindong would also appear in the first part (as a result, appearing in a whole episode)	3.562%
445	August 10, 2024	Ji Jin-hee, Kim Ji-soo, Jung Woong-in, Minho (Shinee)		2.428%
446	August 17, 2024	Park Sung-woong, Moon Jeong-hee, Choi Won-young, Park Hyo-joo		1.594%
447	August 24, 2024	Oh My Girl		1.633%
448	August 31, 2024	Kim Ha-yun, Kim Min-jong, Park Hye-jeong, Park Tae-joon		2.130%
449	September 7, 2024	Park Jae-han (Pani Bottle), Lee Won-ji (1G), Park Jae-il (Channel Korean Jay)		2.300%
450	September 14, 2024	Enoch, Son Tae-jin, Jeon Yu-jin, Kim Da-hyun	Kim Young-chul is absent for this episode	2.477%
451	September 21, 2024	Stray Kids	Special Guest: Leeteuk (Super Junior)	1.158%
452	September 28, 2024	Choi Moo-sung, Choi Won-young, Hwang In-youp, Jung Chae-yeon, Bae Hyun-sung	Choi Won-young does not appear in the second part	1.346%
453	October 5, 2024	ARrC		1.309%
454	October 12, 2024	Kim Sung-ryung, Kim Sun-young, Kim So-yeon, Lee Se-hee		2.066%
455	October 19, 2024	CNBLUE	Lee Jin-ho has been edited out of this episode, and has since stepped down from the show, due to a controversy related to him	1.579%
456	October 26, 2024	Lyuh Esther, Kim Tae-hoon, Lee Kwang-min	Min Kyung-hoon is absent for this episode	2.149%
457	November 2, 2024	Sam Hammington, Brian Joo (Fly to the Sky), Kiss of Life (Julie, Natty)		1.874%
458	November 9, 2024	Jung Ji-sun, Fabrizio Ferrari, Lim Tae-hoon, Yoon Nam-no	Special Guest: Park Seong-on	1.846%
459	November 16, 2024	Lee Jang-won (Peppertones), Kim Min-woo (Mimiminu), Heo Seong-beom, Kim Yoo-yeon (TripleS)		1.823%
460	November 23, 2024	No guests	Knowing Bros Wedding Song Project + Min Kyung-hoon's Wedding; Special Guests: Lee Young-hyun (Big Mama), Park Dong-il; Min Kyung-hoon is absent for the Wedding Song Project; Special appearances by Tei, Yoon Woo-hyun (Buzz), Choi Jin-yi (Rumble Fish), Jung Hyung-don, Kim Yong-man; Special video appearances by Jun Hyun-moo, Shin Dong-yup, Oh My Girl (except Arin), Lyuh Esther, Kim Min-woo (Mimiminu), Alberto Mondi, Yoon Nam-no, Aespa, Lee Chan-won, Ive, CNBLUE, Heo Seong-beom, Julian Quintart, Kim Yoo-yeon (TripleS), Jonathan Yiombi, Kim Sook	2.936%
461	November 30, 2024	Jaejae, Gabee, Baek Seung-heon (Feellikefeel)	Min Kyung-hoon is absent for this episode	1.757%
462	December 21, 2024	Solbi, Car, the Garden, Lee Chang-sub (BtoB)		2.767%
463	December 28, 2024	Im Woo-il, Shin Yun-seung, Kim Ji-yoo, Cho Su-yeon	Special Guest: Jonathan Yiombi; Min Kyung-hoon is absent for this episode	2.607%

== 2025 ==
In the table below, the blue numbers represent the lowest ratings and the red numbers represent the highest ratings.

List of episodes in 2025 (episode 464–511)

Ep. #	Air Date	Guest(s)	Remarks	AGB Nielsen Ratings
464	January 11, 2025	Heo Kyung-hwan, Ha Seung-jin, Kim Yo-han		3.084%
465	January 18, 2025	Lee Bum-ho, Yang Hyeon-jong, Na Sung-bum		2.658%
466	January 25, 2025	Park Nam-jung, Shim Shin, Bibi, Sieun (STAYC), Belle (Kiss of Life), Kim Na-kyoung (TripleS)	Special Guest: Jung Seul	2.773%
467	February 1, 2025	Yoon Jung-soo, Seo Kyung-seok, Yang Sang-guk, Park Ji-hyeon	Special Guest: Kwon Jin-young	3.903%
468	February 8, 2025	Lee Yeon-bok, Jung Ho-young, Park Eun-yeong		2.639%
469	February 15, 2025	Han Sang-jin, Choi Daniel, Jung Hye-in	Special Guests: Eunhyuk (Super Junior), J Black, Kwak Beom	2.689%
470	February 22, 2025	Yang Joon-hyuk, Hong Jin-ho, Lee Hyun-yi, Shin Seong		2.567%
471	March 1, 2025	Choi Tae-sung, Lee Sang-yeob, Jun Hyo-seong		2.689%
472	March 8, 2025	Cha Jun-hwan		2.693%
473	March 15, 2025	Woo Chang-yun, Lee Nak-joon, Oh Jin-sung		2.443%
474	March 22, 2025	Kwon Hyuk-soo, Song Ga-in, Sunye, Jo Kwon (2AM)		2.387%
475	March 29, 2025	Park Kyung-lim, Choi Jin-hyuk, Chuu, Jeong Dong-won		2.293%
476	April 5, 2025	Jo Hye-ryun, Pungja, RalRal, Park Jenny		2.082%
477	April 12, 2025	Lee Seung-yoon, Kwon Eun-bi, Ma Sun-ho, Kim Min-ji		2.291%
478	April 19, 2025	Kang Soo-jin, Ahn Ji-hwan, Lee Sun, Nam Do-hyeong		2.242%
479	April 26, 2025	June Kang, Shim Hyung-tak, Park Joo-ho		2.719%
480	May 3, 2025	Park Seong-on, Kim Tae-yeon, Hwang Min-ho, Lee Cheon-mu, Lee Su-yeon, Oh Ji-yul, Ryu Ji-woo	Special Guest: Do Kyung-wan	2.908%
481	May 10, 2025	Kim Yong-bin, Son Bin-ah, Cheon Lok-dam, Chun Gil, Choi Jae-myung, Chu Hyuk-jin	Special Guest: Chris Young	3.739%
482	May 17, 2025	Choi Hee-am, Moon Kyung-eun, Woo Ji-won, Kim Hoon	Special Guest: Cho Jung-sik; Shindong is absent	2.776%
483	May 24, 2025	I-dle	Special Guest: Cho Jung-sik; Shindong is absent	1.479%
484	May 31, 2025	Jin Tae-hyun, Park Ha-sun, Yang Na-rae, Park Min-chul		2.991%
485	June 7, 2025	Kim Ji-hyun, Chae Ri-na, Kim Jin, Lee Ji-hye	Lee Sang-min's Wedding Reception; Special video appearances by DinDin, Lee Yeon-bok, I-dle, Sleepy, Super Junior, Do Kyung-wan, Choi Min-soo, June Kang	3.198%
486	June 14, 2025	Kim Wan-sun, Narsha (Brown Eyed Girls), Lee Chae-yeon, Chanelle Moon (Fifty Fifty)		1.801%
487	June 21, 2025	Choi Jung-won, Jeong Sun-ah, Leo (VIXX), Lee Chang-sub (BtoB)		1.936%
488	June 28, 2025	Park Joon-hyung (g.o.d), Ko Jun, Lee Sang-joon, Yuk Jun-seo		2.426%
489	July 5, 2025	Choo Shin-soo, Shin Gi-ru, Hong Yun-hwa, Shin Hyun-soo		2.172%
490	July 12, 2025	Super Junior		2.256%
491	July 19, 2025	Han Sang-jin, Park Jung-eun, Wang Ji-won, Park Jong-suk		3.165%
492	July 26, 2025	Tim, Paul Kim, Zo Zazz, Kang Daniel	Lee Sang-min is absent	2.344%
493	August 2, 2025	Kwon Jung-yeol (10cm), Heize, Ahn Ji-young (BOL4)	Kim Young-chul is absent	1.717%
494	August 9, 2025	Seo Kwon-sun, Park Joon-geum, Moon Hee-kyung, Oh Min-ae		2.657%
495	August 16, 2025	Choi Tae-sung, Jang Ye-won, Lee Jung-hyun		2.499%
496	August 23, 2025	Park Jun-gyu, Yum Kyung-hwan, Lee Kyu-han, Jang Hee-jin		2.500%
497	August 30, 2025	Kim Jae-hyeok (Orbit), Kim Seon-tae (Chungju Man), Risabae		2.173%
498	September 6, 2025	Kim Ho-young, Lee Seok-hoon (SG Wannabe), Hur Young-ji (Kara), Lee Mi-joo		2.283%
499	September 13, 2025	Jung Min-cheul, Lee Dae-hyung, Na Ji-wan, Yoon Suk-min	Special Guests: Kim Hwan, Jang Sung-kyu; Kim Hee-chul and Shindong are absent	1.764%
500	September 20, 2025	No guests	Knowing Bros 500th Episode Special (With 500 Participants) (Part 1); Special Guests: Leeteuk (Super Junior), Jo Hye-ryun	2.506%
501	September 27, 2025	No guests	Knowing Bros 500th Episode Special (With 500 Participants) (Part 2); Special Guests: Leeteuk (Super Junior), Kim Si-hyeon, Im Dae-hyung, Lee Young-hyun (Big Mama), Lee Chan-won	2.006%
502	October 4, 2025	Park Joon-hyung, Kim Ji-hye, Kim Ga-yeon, Lim Yo-hwan		2.427%
503	October 18, 2025	Alberto Mondi, Christian Burgos, Leo Ranta, Kany Diabaté Ahn, NCT (Ten, Xiaojun), Moka (Illit), Brigitte Francisca Ciss/Bibi	Special Guest: Do Kyung-wan	3.174%
504	October 25, 2025	Kim Won-hun, Cho Jin-se, Eom Ji-yoon	Special Guest: Kim Min-woo (Mimiminu)	2.040%
505	November 1, 2025	Fly to the Sky, Jeong Jae-hyung, Kim Min-soo	Special Guest: Miyeon (I-dle); Kim Hee-chul and Shindong are absent	2.021%
506	November 8, 2025	Sunmi, Lee Chan-won, Song Min-jun	Special Guest: Kim Min-woo (Mimiminu)	2.259%
507	November 15, 2025	AllDay Project	Special Guest: Christian Burgos	2.407%
508	November 22, 2025	Chon Tae-poong, Park Eun-seok, Son Tae-jin, Jeong Jin-woon (2AM)		2.272%
509	November 29, 2025	g.o.d (Danny Ahn, Son Ho-young, Kim Tae-woo)		2.203%
510	December 6, 2025	Lee Yoon-seok, Lee Ho-cheol, Dawn, Kim Kyu-won	Special Guest: Kim Hwan; Kim Hee-chul and Shindong are absent	2.540%
511	December 13, 2025	Yun Sung-bin, Kim Min-jae, Amotti, Jang Eun-sil, Choi Seung-yeon		2.172%

== 2026 ==
In the table below, the blue numbers represent the lowest ratings and the red numbers represent the highest ratings.

- Beginning November 17, 2026, the updated Nielsen Korea website does not show the ratings in up to 3 decimal places, but only up to 1 decimal place.
List of episodes in 2026 (episode 512–present)

Ep. #	Air Date	Guest(s)	Remarks	AGB Nielsen Ratings
512	January 3, 2026	Yoon Jung-soo, Abhishek Gupta/Lucky, Park Ha-na, Nam Bo-ra		2.704%
513	January 10, 2026	Shin Bong-sun, Yang Sang-guk, Kwak Beom, Lee Seon-min, Lee Jae-youl		1.919%
514	January 17, 2026	Lee Oh-wook, Gwyn Dorado, Kim Jae-min, slowly, sEODo, Kyuri, Kim Ye-chan	Special Guests: Kim Hwan, Im Woo-il; Kim Hee-chul and Shindong are absent	2.229%
515	January 24, 2026	Kim Dae-ho, Kwaktube		3.197%
516	January 31, 2026	Kim Jang-hoon, Bae Ki-sung, Jadu	Shindong is absent	2.200%
517	February 7, 2026	Bae Sung-jae, Kwak Yoon-gy, Park Seung-hi	Special Guest: Kim Hwan; Shindong is absent	2.315%
518	February 14, 2026	Cheon Sang-hyeon, Song Hoon, Lee Moon-jung, Yun Na-ra	Special Guest: Kim Hwan; Kim Young-chul and Shindong are absent	2.723%
519	February 28, 2026	Tei, Kim Shin-young, Heebab, Song Ha-bin	Shindong is absent	2.910%
520	March 14, 2026	Hearts2Hearts, KiiiKiii	Special Guest: Kim Min-woo (Mimiminu); Shindong is absent	1.450%
521	March 21, 2026	Park Ji-soo, Lee So-hee, Jeong Gyeo-woon, Choi Ji-ho	Shindong is absent	1.720%
522	March 28, 2026	Solji (EXID), Ku Su-kyung, Kang Hye-yeon, Hong Ji-yun, Kim Tae-yeon, Lee Soo-yeon	Special Guest: Kim Hwan; Shindong is absent	2.509%
523	April 4, 2026	Jung Sang-hoon, Shin Sung-rok, Kim Gun-woo	Special Guest: Kim Hwan; Shindong is absent	2.175%
524	April 11, 2026	Seol Min-seok, Lee Min-woo, Jung Tae-woo	Shindong is absent	3.152%
525	April 18, 2026	Jeong Bo-seok, Ye Ji-won, Park Ha-sun	Special Guests: Kim Shin-young, Kim Hwan; Shindong is absent	2.150%
526	April 25, 2026	Kim Jong-seo, Kang Kyun-sung (Noel), Lim Jeong-hee, Wendy (Red Velvet), Kim Jae-hwan	Special Guest: Kim Hwan; Kim Hee-chul and Shindong are absent	1.314%
527	May 2, 2026	Lee Gi-kwang (Highlight), Soyou, Sandeul (B1A4), Sung Han-bin (Zerobaseone)	Special Guests: Kim Shin-young, Kim Hwan, B1A4 (CNU, Gongchan); Shindong is absent	1.473%
528	May 9, 2026	Kim Young-ok, Sa Mi-ja, Nam Neung-mi	Kim Shin-young joins the regular cast lineup beginning this episode Kim Hee-chul and Shindong are absent	2.174%
529	May 16, 2026	I.O.I (Lim Na-young, Kim Chung-ha, Kim So-hye, Yoo Yeon-jung, Choi Yoo-jung, Kim Do-yeon, Jeon So-mi)	Special Guest: Kim Hwan; Kim Hee-chul and Shindong are absent	1.010%
530	May 23, 2026	Ha Seok-ju, Kim Tae-young, Kim Young-kwang	Special Guest: Kim Hwan; Kim Hee-chul and Shindong are absent	1.836%
531	May 30, 2026	Christina Confalonieri, Choi Ye-na, And2ble (Zhang Hao, Han Yu-jin)	Special Guest: Kim Hwan; Kim Hee-chul and Shindong are absent	1.157%
532	June 6, 2026	Lim Yong-han, Chae Seung-byung, Her Jun	Special Guest: Kim Hwan; Kim Hee-chul and Shindong are absent	1.870%
533	June 13, 2026	Lee Kyung-sil, Jo Hye-ryun, Kim Ji-sun, Kim Hyo-jin	Special Guest: Kim Hwan; Kim Hee-chul and Shindong are absent	2.463%
534	June 20, 2026	Brown Eyed Girls (JeA, Narsha), Fromis_9 (Lee Chae-young, Baek Ji-heon), Rescene (Woni, Minami), Baby Dont Cry (Yihyun, Beni)	Special Guest: Kim Hwan; Kim Hee-chul and Shindong are absent	1.332%
535	June 27, 2026	Minho (Shinee), Chanyeol (Exo), Moon Soo-in, Jeong Kyu-min	Special Guest: Kim Hwan; Kim Hee-chul and Shindong are absent	1.366%
536	July 11, 2026	I-dle	Special Guest: Kim Hwan; Kim Hee-chul and Shindong are absent	1.170%
537	July 25, 2026	U-Know Yunho (TVXQ), Seo Eun-kwang (BtoB), Hyojung (Oh My Girl), Myung Jae-hyun (BoyNextDoor)	Special Guest: Kim Hwan; Kim Hee-chul and Shindong are absent	1.376%
538	August 1, 2026	Oh Man-seok, Yeon Jung-hoon, Chani (SF9), Lee Tak-soo	Special Guest: Kim Hwan; Kim Hee-chul and Shindong are absent	1.970%
539	August 8, 2026	Hong Jin-ho, Park Ji-min, Choi Yeon-cheong, Heo Seong-beom	Special Guest: Kim Hwan; Kim Hee-chul and Shindong are absent	1.150%
540	August 15, 2026	Im Woo-il, Hwang Je-sung, Nam Ho-yeon, Kwak Beom	Special Guest: Kim Hwan; Kim Hee-chul and Shindong are absent	1.747%
541	August 29, 2026	Ji Sang-ryeol, Lee Eun-gyeol, Park Ji-won (Fromis_9), Tsuki (Billlie)	Special Guest: Kwak Beom; Kim Hee-chul, Min Kyung-hoon and Shindong are absent	1.547%
542	September 5, 2026	Han Suk-joon, Jang Young-ran, Shin Gi-ru, Hwang Jae-gyun	Special Guest: Kim Hwan; Kim Hee-chul, Min Kyung-hoon and Shindong are absent	1.659%
543	September 12, 2026	Go Myung-hwan, Oh Sang-jin, Kim So-young, Kwon Eun-bi	Special Guest: Lee Jae-youl; Kim Hee-chul, Min Kyung-hoon and Shindong are absent Kim So-young does not appear in the second part	1.756%
544	September 26, 2026	Seol Min-seok, Mimi (Oh My Girl), Fromis_9 (Song Ha-young, Lee Chae-young, Baek Ji-heon)	Chuseok Special Trip to Andong; Special Guest: Lee Jae-youl; Kim Young-chul is absent for most of Episode 544; he would only appear from the last part of the episode Kim Hee-chul, Min Kyung-hoon and Shindong are absent	2.225%
545	October 3, 2026	Seol Min-seok, Mimi (Oh My Girl), Fromis_9 (Song Ha-young, Lee Chae-young, Baek Ji-heon)	Chuseok Special Trip to Andong; Special Guest: Lee Jae-youl; Kim Young-chul is absent for most of Episode 544; he would only appear from the last part of the episode Kim Hee-chul, Min Kyung-hoon and Shindong are absent	2.353%
546	October 10, 2026	Kang Lee-seul, Byun Jun-hyung, Lee So-hee, Lee Woo-suk, Lee Jung-hyun	Special Guests: Kim Hwan, Im Woo-il; Kim Hee-chul, Min Kyung-hoon, Shindong and Kim Shin-young are absent	1.413%
547	October 17, 2026	Lee Kye-in, Kim Yon-ja, Hyun Sook	Special Guest: Kim Won-hyo; Kim Hee-chul, Min Kyung-hoon and Shindong are absent	2.182%
548	October 24, 2026	Ahn Hyo-seop, Hong Hwa-yeon, Chang Ryul, Jung Yoo-jin	Special Guest: Mijoo; Kim Hee-chul, Min Kyung-hoon and Shindong are absent	1.437%
549	October 31, 2026	Lee Seung-chul, Woodz	Special Guests: Kim Hwan, Kang Kyun-sung (Noel), Shim Jin-hwa; Kim Hee-chul, Min Kyung-hoon and Shindong are absent	1.832%
550	November 7, 2026	Kim Hyun-chul, Kim Young-hee, Lee Ji-hyun	Special Guest: Im Woo-il; Kim Hee-chul, Min Kyung-hoon and Shindong are absent	2.187%
551	November 14, 2026	Ateez (Seonghwa, Yunho, Yeosang, San, Mingi, Jongho)	Special Guests: Eom Ji-yoon, Kim Hwan; Kim Hee-chul, Min Kyung-hoon and Shindong are absent	1.080%
552	November 21, 2026	Sean, Kang Jae-jun, Oh Ha-young (Apink), Dayoung (WJSN)	Special Guest: Soyou; Kim Hee-chul, Min Kyung-hoon and Shindong are absent	1.640%
553	November 28, 2026	Jeong Jun-ha, Seo Kyung-seok, Kim Byung-man, Solar (Mamamoo)	Special Guest: Mijoo; Kim Hee-chul, Min Kyung-hoon and Shindong are absent	%

== Cancellation of broadcasting ==
Date	Scheduled episode	Reason	Notes	Ref.
December 31, 2016	57	JTBC Year End Special	Broadcast of Remember 2016, Anticipate 2017	
September 14, 2019	197	Chuseok	Broadcast of The Great Battle	
January 25, 2020	215	Seollal	Broadcast of Money	
October 3, 2020	250	Park Kyung's controversy / Chuseok	Featuring Kim Ji-seok, Ha Seok-jin and Park Kyung (Block B) / Broadcast of Black Money	
February 13, 2021	268	Seollal	Broadcast of Sing Again Special	
November 5, 2022	357	Itaewon Halloween crowd crush	Broadcast of Hidden Singer	
December 30, 2023	415	Special Programming	Broadcast of "Sing Again 3" episode	
August 3, 2024	445	Special Programming	Cancelled due to 2024 Summer Olympics	
December 7, 2024	462	2024 South Korean martial law	Extended broadcast of JTBC Newsroom	
December 14, 2024	462	2024 South Korean martial law	Extended broadcast of JTBC Newsroom	
January 4, 2025	464	Jeju Air Flight 2216	Broadcast of The Tale of Lady Ok	
December 20, 2025	512	Special Programming	Broadcast of Knowing Bros Special for Culinary Class Wars	
December 27, 2025	512	Special Programming	Broadcast of Knowing Bros Special for Hot Topic Transfer Students of 2025	
February 21, 2026	519	2026 Winter Olympics	Live Broadcast of 2026 Winter Olympics	
March 7, 2026	520	2026 World Baseball Classic	Broadcast of The Practical Guide to Love	
July 4, 2026	536	2026 FIFA World Cup	Broadcast of 2026 FIFA World Cup Goals Collection	
July 18, 2026	537	2026 FIFA World Cup	Broadcast of 2026 FIFA World Cup Argentina Highlights	
August 22, 2026	541	Special Programming	Broadcast of Knowing Bros Special for The King's Warden (featuring Park Ji-hoon, Jang Hang-jun and Seol Min-seok)	
September 19, 2026	544	Special Programming	Broadcast of Knowing Bros Special for Girls' Generation-HRS	

== See also ==
- List of Knowing Bros special series
