= List of Knowing Bros special series =

Throughout the history of Knowing Bros, this segments is shown on both TV and YouTube, after the end of a Knowing Bros episodes.

== Job consultation room ==
An official corner of the show after the Brother School segment for the episode has ended. Jang Sung-kyu, Shindong and Jeong Se-woon would let guests (different from in Brother School), as Variety Job Lookers, to prove their variety skills to the three.

=== MC ===
- Jang Sung-kyu
- Shindong
- Jeong Se-woon

=== Episodes ===
Ep. #	Ep. #	Air Date	Guest(s)
204	1	November 9, 2019	Pengsoo, Hwang Kwang-hee
205	2	November 16, 2019	Pengsoo, Hwang Kwang-hee
206	3	November 23, 2019	Pengsoo, Hwang Kwang-hee
208	4	December 7, 2019	Lee Seung-yoon, Copychu
209	5	December 14, 2019	Lee Seung-yoon, Copychu
210	6	December 21, 2019	Lee Seung-yoon, Copychu
212	7	January 4, 2020	(G)I-DLE (Soojin, Yuqi, Shuhua)
213	8	January 11, 2020	(G)I-DLE (Soojin, Yuqi, Shuhua)
214	9	January 18, 2020	(G)I-DLE (Soojin, Yuqi, Shuhua)
215	10	February 1, 2020	Sleepy
216	11	February 8, 2020	Sleepy
217	12	February 15, 2020	GFriend
218	13	February 22, 2020	GFriend
219	14	February 29, 2020	GFriend

== After school activities: Dong Dong Shin Ki ==
Kang Ho-dong, together with Shindong (Super Junior), visits various idols and learn idol songs choreographs. Several other guests will then watch the final dancing videos and comment on them. This activity lasted from July 11 to October 24, 2020.

=== Cast ===
- Kang Ho-dong
- Shindong

=== Episodes ===
Ep. #	Ep. #	Air Date	Guest(s)
238	1	July 11, 2020	Beginning with Dong Dong Shin Ki
239	2	July 18, 2020	Kim Jong-min (Koyote), EXO-SC
240	3	July 25, 2020	Red Velvet - Irene & Seulgi
241	4	August 1, 2020	Red Velvet - Irene & Seulgi, Kim Jong-kook, Oh My Girl (Mimi, Seunghee), Winner (Mino, Seungyoon)
242	5	August 8, 2020	Wooyoung (2PM), Bang Chan (Stray Kids)
243	6	August 15, 2020	Wooyoung (2PM), Bang Chan (Stray Kids), Super Junior-D&E, Jessi, Nichkhun (2PM)
244	7	August 22, 2020	Na Ha-eun
245	8	August 29, 2020	Kai (EXO), Taeyong (NCT)
246	9	September 5, 2020	SuperM, Hyoyeon (Girls' Generation), Block B (Park Kyung, P.O)
247	10	September 12, 2020	(G)I-DLE (Soojin, Yuqi)
248	11	September 19, 2020	(G)I-DLE (Miyeon, Soojin, Soyeon, Yuqi), Ha Sung-woon (Hotshot), Seohyun (Girls' Generation)
249	12	September 26, 2020	Kim Ji-hoon, Super Junior-D&E
250	13	October 10, 2020	Super Junior-D&E, Super Junior-K.R.Y., GFriend (Yerin, SinB)
251	14	October 17, 2020	IZ*ONE (Kwon Eun-bi, Choi Ye-na, Jang Won-young)
252	15	October 24, 2020	IZ*ONE

== After school activities: Universe hipsters ==
Universe Cowards (Kim Hee-chul, Min Kyung-hoon) visit rappers and learn hip hop and rapping from them. This activity began from October 31, 2020, to January 2, 2021.

Through this activity, Kim Hee-chul and Min Kyung-hoon have released a new hip hop single "Hanryang" (한량), which is produced by DinDin and features BIBI. The single was released on December 20 at 00:00 (KST).

As a fulfillment of their promise for the "Hanryang" (한량) music video reaching 1 million views in 24 hours, Universe Cowards held an online fan-meet on January 14, 2021, with special guests DinDin, BIBI, and Ateez.

=== Cast ===
- Kim Hee-chul
- Min Kyung-hoon

=== Episodes ===
Ep. #	Ep. #	Air Date	Guest(s)
253	1	October 31, 2020	Lee Young-ji
254	2	November 7, 2020	Lee Young-ji
255	3	November 14, 2020	DinDin
256	4	November 21, 2020	DinDin
257	5	November 28, 2020	Swings, DinDin, Kid Milli, Park Dae-hee
258	6	December 5, 2020	Swings, DinDin, Kid Milli
259	7	December 12, 2020	DinDin, BIBI
260	8	December 19, 2020	DinDin, BIBI
261	9	December 26, 2020	DinDin, BIBI, Shindong (Super Junior), Ateez
262	10	January 2, 2021	MFBTY, Swings, Kid Milli

== After school activities: Lots of advice ==
Seo Jang-hoon and Lee Soo-geun, a duo in Brother School that is well known for their chemistry, get advice on various games, alongside Shindong (Super Junior). This activity began from January 16 to April 17, 2021.

=== Cast ===
- Seo Jang-hoon
- Lee Soo-geun
- Shindong (Super Junior)

=== Episodes ===
Ep. #	Ep. #	Air Date	Game	Guest(s)
264	1	January 16, 2021	Crazyracing Kartrider	NCT (Jungwoo, Jeno, Chenle)
265	2	January 23, 2021	Crazyracing Kartrider	NCT (Jungwoo, Jeno, Chenle)
266	3	January 30, 2021	Crazyracing Kartrider	NCT (Jungwoo, Jeno, Chenle)
267	4	February 6, 2021	Among Us	Monsta X (Minhyuk, Hyungwon, Joohoney)
268	5	February 20, 2021	Among Us	Monsta X (Minhyuk, Hyungwon, Joohoney)
269	6	February 27, 2021	Board Games	—N/a
270	7	March 6, 2021	Board Games	—N/a
271	8	March 13, 2021	Drinking Games	Lee Yong-jin, Lee Jin-ho
272	9	March 20, 2021	Drinking Games	Lee Yong-jin, Lee Jin-ho
273	10	March 27, 2021	Drinking Games	Lee Yong-jin, Lee Jin-ho
274	11	April 3, 2021	PUBG	Apink (Yoon Bo-mi, Oh Ha-young)
275	12	April 10, 2021	PUBG	Apink (Yoon Bo-mi, Oh Ha-young)
276	13	April 17, 2021	PUBG	Apink (Yoon Bo-mi, Oh Ha-young)

== See also ==
- List of Knowing Bros episodes
