= Mind reading =

Mind reading may refer to:

- Telepathy, the transfer of information between individuals by means other than the five senses
- The illusion of telepathy in the performing art of mentalism
  - Cold reading, a set of techniques used by mentalists to imply that the reader knows much more about the person than the reader actually does
  - Hot reading, a technique used when giving a psychic reading in stage magic performances
- Brain-reading, the use of neuroimaging techniques to read human minds
- A cognitive distortion of the jumping to conclusions type
- "Mind Reading" (short story), a 2015 story by Kwak Jaesik

== See also ==
- Mindreader (disambiguation)
