= Mindreader =

Mindreader may refer to:

- Mindreader, a person capable of telepathy
- Mindreader, a practitioner of mentalism
- Mindreaders, an American game show
- The Mind Reader, a 1933 American film
- "Mind Reader" (Silverchair song), 2007
- "Mind Reader" (Dustin Lynch song), 2014
- "Mindreader", a song by A Day to Remember from their 2021 album You're Welcome
- "Mind Reader", a song by Sebadoh from their 1996 album Harmacy
- Mind Reader – An Evening of Wonders, a stage show by Derren Brown
- "Mind Reader", a song by Mimi Webb and Meghan Trainor

== See also ==
- Mind reading (disambiguation)
