= Jeong Se-woon =

South Korean singer (born 1997)

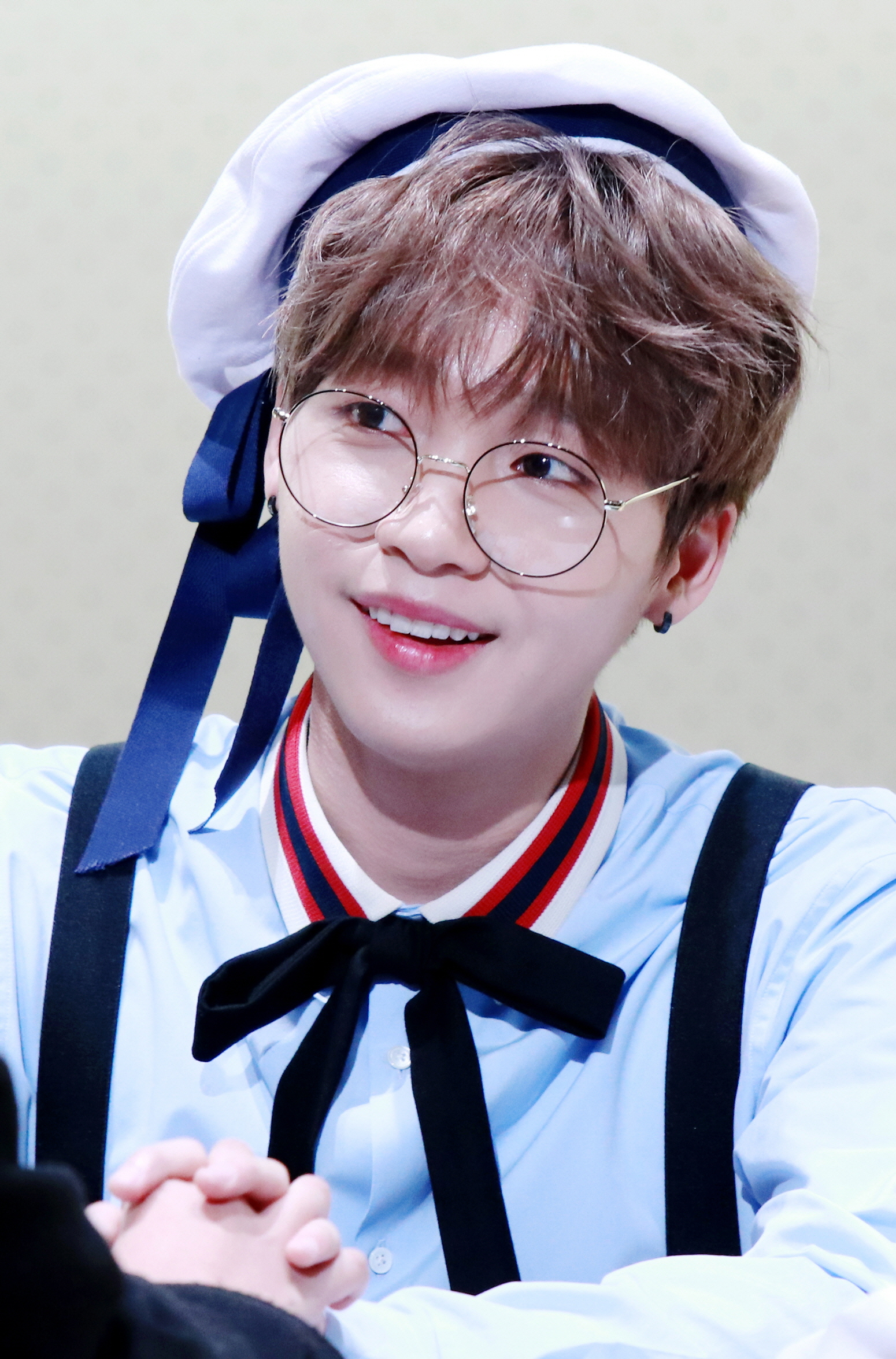
- Jeong in 2018
- Born: May 31, 1997 (age 29); Masan, South Gyeongsang, South Korea
- Education: Howon University
- Occupations: Singer; songwriter
- Musical career
- Genres: K-pop; R&B
- Instruments: Vocals; Acoustic Guitar; Electric Guitar; Piano; Saxophone; Drums
- Years active: 2013–present
- Labels: Starship Entertainment; Cam With Us
- Website: Official website

Korean name
- Hangul: 정세운
- Hanja: 鄭世雲
- RR: Jeong Seun
- MR: Chŏng Seun

Jeong Se-woon (Korean: 정세운, born May 31, 1997) is a South Korean singer-songwriter. He debuted as solo artist with released the first part of his debut EP Ever on August 31, 2017. Jeong is known for being a contestant on the survival show Produce 101 Season 2 in 2017.

== Career ==
=== 2013–2017: Pre-debut ===
Jeong's first public appearance was in 2013, as a contestant in the third season of K-pop Star. He passed the first round of auditions with a performance of his original song titled "Mom, Wait a Minute" (엄마 잠깐만). One of the judges in the show, founder and former JYP Entertainment CEO Park Jin-young, praised the musical form of the song and likened him to AKMU, who were the winners of the second season of K-pop Star. Starting from the third round, he competed as part of the duo Something (썸띵) with fellow contestant Kim Ah-hyeon. The duo reached the finals but was eliminated during the first round of live performances. In July 2014, three months after the show concluded, Jeong signed a contract with Starship Entertainment.

In 2017, he represented Starship Entertainment in Produce 101 Season 2 alongside fellow trainee Lee Gwang-hyun. He became part of the Top 20 but was eliminated during the finale, after ranking 12th overall with 769,859 votes. After the show, on August 1, it was reported that he had started preparing for his solo debut.

=== 2017–2019: Debut and commercial solo success ===
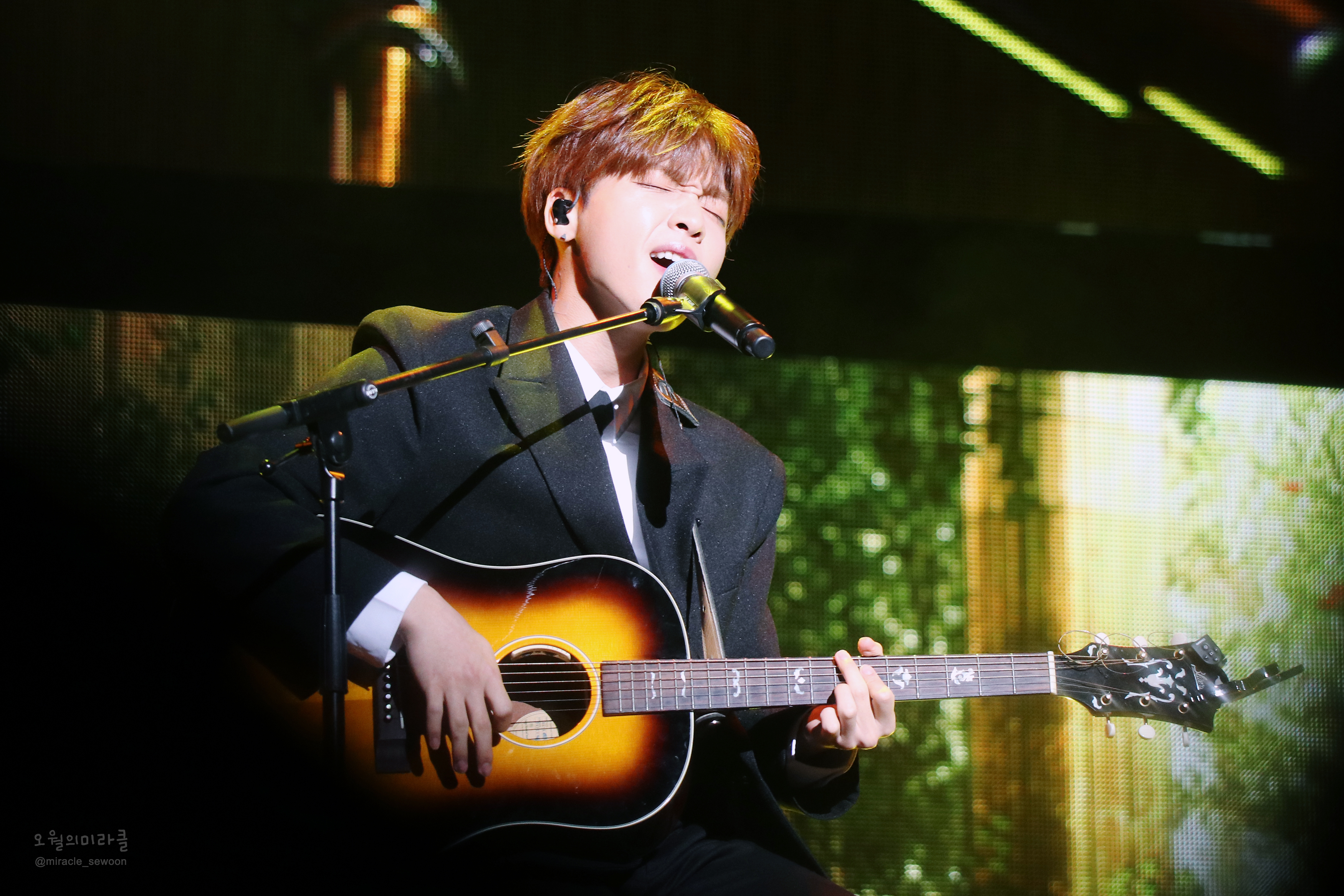
Jeong performing in 2017

Jeong debuted as a solo artist on August 31, with his first EP titled Ever, (Note: Ever is also referred to as The 1st Mini Album, Pt. 1 Ever.) which peaked at number two on the Gaon Album Chart after selling 23,438 copies within its first week. The EP contain six songs, including his original compositions "Miracle" and "Never Mind", as well as the title track "Just U", featuring rapper Sik-K. "Just U" peaked at number eight and had more than 59,790 digital downloads within the first week of sales.

His second EP, After was released on January 15, 2018. The title track of the album was "Baby It's U" and the album contained the self-produced track "Close Over". Jeong also held his first concert Ever: After in 2018.

In 2019, Jeong became a radio DJ for EBS Radio's "Listen".

=== 2020–present: 24, Where Is My Garden!, Quiz and label change ===
On June 23, it was confirmed that Jeong would make his summer comeback with his first studio album 24 Part. 1 on July 14. Jeong participated in the writing and production of the album, with the album showing musical growth while still retaining Jeong's musical style. On December 16, it was announced that Jeong would return with the second part of his studio album 24 Part. 2 on January 6, 2021. 24 Part. 2 has been described as "a more melancholy, rock-pop sound" than his previous EP.

On April 6, 2022, Jeong published his first article 'Honorable Words'. On April 25, Starship Entertainment announced that Jeong would be making a comeback with his fifth EP, Where Is My Garden! on May 11. On July 13, it was announced that Jeong his solo concert 2022 Jeong Se-woon Concert Our Garden on August 27 and 28 at the Blue Square Mastercard Hall in Yongsan District, Seoul, and it will be the concert in three years. On September 29, it was announced that Jeong would have a fan meeting on October 29.

On January 4, 2024, Jeong released his sixth EP, Quiz. 1 year and 8 months after his fifth mini-album Where is my Garden!, released in May 2022.

On September 8, 2024, it was announced that Jeong will leave Starship Entertainment after ten years, deciding not to renew his contract.

On October 31, 2024, it was exclusively reported that Jeong has joined the label Cam With Us, home to artists including Davichi, Silica Gel, and more.

On April 13, 2025, it was announced that Jeong's first single under Cam With Us, Eternally, was going to be released on April 20. Along with his first EP under the label, and seventh since debut, Brut on May 15.

== Discography ==
=== Studio albums ===
List of studio albums, with selected details
| Title | Details | Peak chart positions | Sales |
| Title | Details | KOR | Sales |
|---|---|---|---|
| 24 | 24 Part. 1; Released: July 14, 2020; Label: Starship Entertainment; Formats: CD, digital download; Track listing: 1. "Say Yes"; 2. "Don't Know"; 3. "Horizon"; 4. "Beeeee"; 5. "O" (동그라미); 6. "Hidden Star" (새벽별) | 12 | KOR: 15,285 |
| 24 | 24 Part. 2; Released: January 6, 2021; Label: Starship Entertainment; Formats: CD, digital download; Track listing: 1. ":m (Mind)"; 2. "In the Dark"; 3. "Fine"; 4. "DoDoDo"; 5. "Find You" (숨은 그림 찾기); 6. "Be a Fool" | 12 | KOR: 14,229 |

=== Extended plays ===
List of extended plays, with selected details
| Title | Details | Peak chart positions | Sales |
| Title | Details | KOR | Sales |
|---|---|---|---|
| Ever | Released: August 31, 2017; Label: Starship Entertainment; Formats: CD, digital download; Track listing: 1. "Just U" (feat. Sik-K) (Prod. GroovyRoom); 2. "Slower Than Ever" (바다를 나는 거북이) (Prod. Duble Sidekick); 3. "Miracle" (Prod. Joombas); 4. "Oh! My Angel" (오! 나의 여신) (feat. Lee Gwang-hyun) (Prod. Kiggen, Assbrass); 5. "If You" (괜찮다면) (feat. Brother Su) (Prod. Brother Su); 6. "Never Mind" (오해는 마) (Prod. Jeong Se-woon) | 2 | KOR: 41,586 |
| After | Released: January 24, 2018; Label: Starship Entertainment; Formats: CD, digital download; Track listing: 1. "Baby It's U" (Prod. Kiggen, Earattack); 2. "Toc, toC" (Prod. Maktub); 3. "Irony" (Prod. Primary); 4. "No Better Than This" (Prod. Joombas); 5. "I Love You" (독백) (Prod. Godak of Mind U); 6. "Close Over" (닿을 듯 말 듯) (Prod. Echae Kang, Jeong Se-woon) | 3 | KOR: 30,850; JPN: 271 |
| Another | Released: July 23, 2018; Label: Starship Entertainment; Formats: CD, digital download; Track listing: 1. "20 Something" (Prod. Jeong Dong-hwan (MeloMance), Jeong Se-woon); 2. "Waterfall" (Prod. Tasco, Junzo); 3. "Eye 2 Eye" (Prod. Caesar & Loui); 4. "La La" (Prod. Duble Sidekick); 5. "I Wonder" (Prod. Joombas); 6. "Shadows" (Prod. Kiggen) | 5 | KOR: 23,707 |
| Plus Minus Zero | Released: March 19, 2019; Label: Starship Entertainment; Formats: CD, digital download; Track listing: 1. "Feeling" (feat. Penomeco); 2. "My Ocean" (나의 바다); 3. "Your Favorite Song" (니가 좋아한 노래); 4. "Distance" (너와 나의 거리); 5. "Going Home"; 6. "White" | 3 | KOR: 20,388 |
| Day | Released: October 2, 2019; Label: Starship Entertainment; Formats: CD, digital download; Track listing: 1. "When It Rains" (비가 온대 그날처럼); 2. "Day & Day"; 3. "Lie Lie Lie"; 4. "Love in Fall" (온도차); 5. "When You Call My Name" (내 이름을 부르면) | 5 | KOR: 17,999 |
| Where Is My Garden! | Released: May 11, 2022; Label: Starship Entertainment; Formats: CD, digital download; Track listing: 1. "Garden"; 2. "Roller Coaster"; 3. "10 Minutes" (10분); 4. "Book"; 5. "Nerdy"; 6. "Pull Me Down" (with zai.ro) | 9 | KOR: 15,403 |
| Quiz | Released: January 4, 2024; Label: Starship Entertainment; Formats: CD, digital download | 6 | KOR: 14,599 |
| Brut | Released: May 15, 2025; Label: Cam With Us; Formats: CD, digital download | 23 | KOR: 2,100 |
| Love in the Margins | Released: March 31, 2026; Label: Cam With Us; Formats: CD, digital download | 22 | KOR: 3,919 |

=== Singles ===
| Title | Year | Peak chart positions | Sales | Album |
| Title | Year | KOR | Sales | Album |
|---|---|---|---|---|
| "Just U" (with Sik-K) | 2017 | 24 | KOR: 152,216 | Ever |
| "Baby It's U" | 2018 | 89 | —N/a | After |
| "20 Something" | 2018 | 99 | —N/a | Another |
| "Feeling" (feat. Penomeco) | 2019 | 183 | —N/a | Plus Minus Zero |
| "When You Call My Name" (내 이름을 부르면) | 2019 | — | —N/a | Day |
| "When It Rains" (비가 온대 그날처럼) | 2019 | — | —N/a | Day |
| "Say Yes" | 2020 | — | —N/a | 24 Part. 1 |
| "In the Dark" | 2021 | — | —N/a | 24 Part. 2 |
| "Roller Coaster" | 2022 | — | —N/a | Where Is My Garden! |
| "Quiz" | 2024 | — | —N/a | Quiz |
| "Eternally" | 2025 | — | —N/a | Brut |
| "Goodbye" | 2025 | — | —N/a | Brut |
| "Colors" | 2025 | — | —N/a | Non-album single |
| "Love in the Margins" | 2026 | — | —N/a | Love in the Margins |
| "Too Much" | 2026 | — | —N/a | Non-album single |

=== Soundtrack appearances ===
| Title | Year | Peak chart positions | Album |
| Title | Year | KOR | Album |
|---|---|---|---|
| "There's Something" (뭔가 있어) | 2018 | — | Wok of Love OST |
| "It's You" | 2018 | — | What's Wrong with Secretary Kim OST |
| "Told You So" (이봐 이봐 이봐) | 2018 | — | Where Stars Land OST |
| "Good Night" | 2019 | — | Touch Your Heart OST |
| "You" (그대였습니다) | 2019 | — | Flower Crew: Joseon Marriage Agency OST |
| "Draw You" (너를 그린다) | 2019 | — | Extraordinary You OST |
| "Time Machine" | 2021 | — | Scripting Your Destiny OST |
| "Door" | 2021 | — | My Roommate Is a Gumiho OST |
| "My Wonderous Miracle" (네가 나의 기적인 것처럼) | 2021 | — | The Red Sleeve OST |
| "Sunshine" (선샤인) | 2022 | — | Never Give Up OST |
| "I Only See You" (바라만 본다) | 2022 | — | Alchemy of Souls OST |
| "Symphony" (심포니) | 2022 | — | The Interest of Love OST |
| "Blooming" (블루밍) | 2023 | — | The Secret Romantic Guesthouse OST |
| "Fall in Love" | 2023 | — | King the Land OST |

=== Collaborations ===
| Title | Year | Peak chart positions | Album |
| Title | Year | KOR | Album |
|---|---|---|---|
| "Confession" (Mind U with Jeong Se-woon and Yoo Seung-woo) | 2017 | — | Dear |
| "Christmas Day" (크리스마스 데이) (as Starship Planet) | 2017 | — | Non-album singles |
| "Love It Live It" (as YDPP (MXM, Jeong Se-woon and Lee Kwang-hyun) | 2018 | — | Non-album singles |
| "Christmas Time" (벌써 크리스마스) (as Starship Planet) | 2018 | — | Non-album singles |
| "Buffalo" (Sunwoo Jung-a ft. DAMI, Song Eun I, Yoo Seung-Woo, Jeong Sewoon, 15 Oxen) | 2021 | — | Buffalo |
| "Walk" | 2021 | — | [Vol.95] You Hee Yul's Sketchbook: 61th Voice 'Sketchbook x Jeong Sewoon |
| "Secret Garden" | 2021 | — | [Vol.96] You Hee Yul's Sketchbook: 61th Voice 'Sketchbook x Jeong Sewoon |
| "Happy Me From Today" | 2022 | — | Two Tracks Project Vol.3 |
| "Wave" (Exy of WJSN ft. Jeong Sewoon) | 2022 | — | <Second World> Episode 7 |

=== Other charted songs ===
| Title | Year | Peak chart positions | Sales | Album |
| Title | Year | KOR | Sales | Album |
|---|---|---|---|---|
| "Slower Than Ever" (바다를 나는 거북이) | 2017 | 92 | KOR: 27,369 | Ever |
| "Miracle" | 2017 | 94 | KOR: 26,914 | Ever |
| "Never Mind" (오해는 마) | 2017 | 95 | KOR: 27,035 | Ever |
| "If You" (괜찮다면) (with Brother Su) | 2017 | — (Note: "If You" peaked at number 96 on the Gaon Domestic Digital Chart.) | KOR: 25,115 | Ever |
| "Oh! My Angel" (오! 나의 여신) (with Lee Gwang-hyun) | 2017 | — | KOR: 23,227 | Ever |
"—" denotes releases that did not chart or were not released in that region.

== Filmography ==
=== Television shows ===
| Year | Title | Role | Note | Ref. |
|---|---|---|---|---|
| 2013–2014 | K-pop Star 3 | Contestant | Ep. 1, 4, 7–8, 11, 13–16, finished in top 10 | |
| 2017 | Produce 101 Season 2 | Contestant | Ep. 1–11, finished in 12th place | |
| 2017 | Master Key | Cast member | Ep. 5, 12 | |
| 2017 | King of Mask Singer | Contestant | Ep. 131–132 | |
| 2018 | Two Yoo Project Sugar Man | Performer | Ep. 5 (Season 2) | |
| 2018 | It's Dangerous Beyond The Blankets | Cast member | Ep. 2-3 (Season 2) | |
| 2018 | Begin Again 2 | Cast member | Ep. 5–7 | |
| 2018 | I've Fallen For You | Host | Ep. 1–2, 4–10 | |
| 2018 | Law of the Jungle | Cast member | Ep. 334–337 | |
| 2018 | Awesome Feed | Cast member | Ep. 14 | |
| 2019–2020 | Knowing Bros - Job Consultation Room | Special Cast | Ep. 204–219 | |
| 2020 | 4 Wheeled Restaurant | Cast member | Season 4 | |
| 2021 | King of Mask Singer | Contestant | Ep. 315–316 | |
| 2021 | King of Mask Singer | Contestant | Ep. 323 (with Kihyun) | |
| 2021 | Cooking - The Birth of a Cooking King | Contestant | | |
| 2022 | Things Are Suspicious these Days | Host | with Lee Kyung-kyu and Hong Jin-kyung | |
| 2022 | Dating is Straight | Host | | |

=== Web shows ===
| Year | Title | Role | Notes | Ref. |
|---|---|---|---|---|
| 2021 | HIDDEN: the performance | Cast Member | with Gyro, Bobby, Haengju,Hanhae, Taeil, Pickboy and Kino | |
| 2022 | Idol Hit Song Festival | Contestant | | |
| 2023 | Nineteen to Twenty | MC | | |

=== Radio shows ===
| Year | Title | Role | Notes | Ref. |
|---|---|---|---|---|
| 2019 | Listen | DJ | | |
| 2021 | Idol Radio Season 2 | Temporary dj | | |
| 2022 | Idol Radio Season 2 | Temporary dj | July 11 and July 14 | |

=== Music videos ===
| Year | Music video | Director(s) | Album |
|---|---|---|---|
| 2017 | "Just U" (feat. Sik-K) | SUNNYVISUAL | Ever |
| 2018 | "Baby It's U" | SUNNYVISUAL | After |
| 2018 | "LOVE IT LIVE IT" (with YDPP) | Han Sa Min (Dextor-Lab) | "YDPP PROJECT" `LOVE IT LIVE IT` |
| 2018 | "20 Something" | Hong Seong Jun | Another |
| 2019 | "Feeling" (feat. PENOMECO) | Lee Junwoo (SALT FILM) | Plus Minus Zero |
| 2019 | "My Ocean" (나의 바다) | Hong Seong Jun | Plus Minus Zero |
| 2019 | "When It Rains" (비가 온대 그날처럼) | Lee Junwoo (SALT FILM) | Day |
| 2020 | "Say Yes" | N/A | 24 pt.1 |
| 2021 | "In The Dark" | Itchcock | 24 pt.2 |
| 2022 | "Roller Coaster" | N/A | Where is my Garden! |

== Theater ==
| Year | Title | Role |
|---|---|---|
| 2019 | Grease | Danny |

== Concerts and tours ==
- Ever After (2018)
- Zero (2019)
- Our Garden (2022)
- The Wave (2023)

== Awards and nominations ==
Year presented, name of the award ceremony, category, nominated work, and the result of the nomination
| Year | Award | Category | Nominated work | Result |
|---|---|---|---|---|
| 2017 | 2nd Asia Artist Awards | Rising Star Award | Jeong Se-woon | Won |
| 2017 | 2nd Asia Artist Awards | Popularity Award | Jeong Se-woon | Nominated |
| 2017 | 19th Mnet Asian Music Awards | Artist of the Year | Jeong Se-woon | Nominated |
| 2017 | 19th Mnet Asian Music Awards | Best New Male Artist | Jeong Se-woon | Nominated |
| 2017 | 9th Melon Music Awards | Best New Artist | Jeong Se-woon | Nominated |
| 2018 | 32nd Golden Disc Awards | New Artist of the Year | Jeong Se-woon | Nominated |
| 2018 | 32nd Golden Disc Awards | Global Popularity Award | Jeong Se-woon | Nominated |
| 2018 | 27th Seoul Music Awards | New Artist Award | Jeong Se-woon | Nominated |
| 2018 | 27th Seoul Music Awards | Popularity Award | Jeong Se-woon | Nominated |
| 2018 | 27th Seoul Music Awards | Hallyu Special Award | Jeong Se-woon | Nominated |
| 2018 | 7th Gaon Chart Music Awards | New Artist of the Year (Song) | "Just U" (with Sik-K) | Nominated |
| 2018 | 2nd Soribada Best K-Music Awards | Best OST | "It's You" (What's Wrong with Secretary Kim) | Won |
| 2018 | 2018 StarHub Night of Stars | Best Asian Drama OST Award | "It's You" (What's Wrong with Secretary Kim) | Won |
| 2019 | 3rd Soribada Best K-Music Awards | Voice Award | Jeong Se-woon | Won |
