= The Final Last of the Ultimate End =

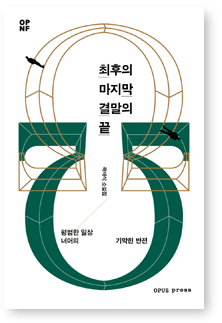
- Front cover from the first edition
- Author: Kwak Jaesik
- Language: Korean
- Genre: Fantasy, science fiction
- Publisher: Opus Press
- Publication date: 29 June 2015
- Publication place: South Korea
- Media type: Print (paperback)
- Pages: 344 pp
- ISBN: 9791195145485

The Final Last of the Ultimate End (최후의 마지막 결말의 끝 Choihu ŭi majimak kyŏrmal ŭi ggŭt) is a collection of short stories by South Korean author Kwak Jaesik, first published in 2015 by Opus Press.

== Composition ==
It contains the following short stories:

- "I Meet Her"
- "Mind Reading (short story)"
- "The Superpower"
- "The Final Last of the Ultimate End (short story)"
- "32 Years of Robot Rebel"
- "Do Not Open It"
- "Do Not Stop Reading This or It Blows"
- "From Dusk of Sunday Till Dawn of Monday"

Most of the stories are categorized into science fiction, but there are exceptions, such as "Do Not Open It". "Do Not Open It" and "Do Not Stop Reading This or It Blows" have metafiction elements.

"Do Not Stop Reading This or It Blows" is an extended version of his story published in the October 2011 issue of Esquire Korean edition.

== Critical response ==
Seonghun Kim, Editor for Cine 21, praised its uniqueness and entertainment value as "charming stories beginning from extra ordinary things but always going with realistic background". Hankook Ilbo also described The Final Last of the Ultimate End as "stories that give catharsis of breaking away from everyday routine". On the other hand, Hyojeong Yoon of Inter Park criticized it, writing "they are funny but too obsessive about humor and joke".

== I Meet Her ==
In "I Meet Her" (original Korean title: "그녀를 만나다"), a man recently recovered from a terminal disease, now waiting for his girlfriend, recounts his experiences in hospital and in a recovery institute.

=== Plot summary ===
A man who had a terminal disease decided to get a whole body transplant surgery, removing his brain from his original body and transplanting it to a new brainless body, which was cloned from his cells. He gets the surgery and it seems to be successful.

He is moved to a recovery institute, adapting himself to his new body. He suffers from mild amnesia and partial motor disturbances, but he works hard to get better, waiting for the day to meet his girlfriend for the first time after the surgery.

When he finally meets his girlfriend, he feels happy, knowing all his feeling and memories about her are right and the interaction with her is natural enough. But his girlfriend looks sad.

It turns out that the surgery was splitting his brain into two pieces and transplanting them into two different bodies, to achieve a safer result because of the redundancy. Hence now there are two independent separate people formed from the one original person. All the activities in the recovery institute were parts of a test to decide whom to be the person to inherit the original identity. The meeting with the girlfriend was also a part of the test.

The protagonist turns out to be a loser in every aspect of the brain activity and continuity, except one, which is memory and interactivity with his spouse. Therefore, the other person gets the original identity and the protagonist gets a brand new identity as a newly born person.

A few months later, he becomes a surfer, which he has always dreamed to be since long before the surgery. He feels quite stable in his new life, but, after coincidentally encountering the other person and his girlfriend, he realizes that he still loves her.

=== Critical response ===
In an article published in Science Times, Jangwon Go praised it, mentioning "being close to essence of science fiction, and raising an interesting question about nature of human existence". But he also criticized its "too explicit speech at the end of the story".

== Mind Reading ==
In "Mind Reading" (original Korean title: "독심술"), a man and a woman, who are working for a metal coloring company, try to win a deal with a smartphone maker by guessing the designer's thoughts.

=== Plot summary ===
A man and a woman, who are employees of a metal coloring company, team up to win a deal with a smartphone maker. This smartphone maker wanted to buy colored metal cases for their newly developed phone from one of the metal coloring companies. The competing metal coloring companies wanted the color ordered from the phone maker to be one in a model they are familiar with, for example, one preferred the RGB color model and another preferred the CMYK color model. However, the phone maker announced, "the color of the phone should be like a color of clean water from a deep mountain". The description of the color was so vague that all of the metal coloring companies could not easily make their sample.

One German company sent their employees to a deep mountain and tried to find the actual color of the water, and one US company performed big data analysis to get the statistically most representative color meant by the expression. One Japanese company sent spies to glean information about the personal preference of the designer. But the winners turned out to be the man and the woman, who ran a small brainwashing program that continuously gave a large number of images of clean water with their own color to the designer in various exposure routes such as TV commercials, signs, and illustrations in books, all manipulated by them to be with clean water colored by their color.

== The Final Last of the Ultimate End ==
In "The Final Last of the Ultimate End" (original Korean title: "최후의 마지막 결말의 끝"), a man, who faces the ultimate fate of the universe, is trying to find what he can do.

=== Plot summary ===
A man who is a pilot of an experimental project, accelerating a spaceship to the speed of light, reaches the extremely far future due to accidental time dilation. He realizes that the time he has arrived at is at the heat death of the universe, which means that he cannot see any person, any living creature, any planet, any star, any reactive atom, nor any active thing whatsoever.

Suffering from extreme loneliness and boredom, he tries to discover one meaningful thing and thinks of his own study of time travel, hoping to get back to his old life, but also thinks about the solipsism of his god-like status, since he is the most magnificent being in the universe and the total representation of the universe at the moment. However, he soon finds out those thoughts are only a megalomaniac fantasy and not a real possibility of a solution for his current state, but just madness.

After a while, he begins to do things that he wanted to do for a long time. He produces his own version of Waiting for Godot by himself and for himself, and he thinks one he has truly loved over and over again. At the end of the story, he asks to the reader, "what will be the end of this story?". The options he suggests are suicide and mental breakdown. However, the true end of the story is hearing a transmission from his loved one, who has followed him with the same kind of spaceship only to meet him.

=== Critical response ===
Seonghun Kim, Editor for Cine 21, praised its sense of realism and easiness as "recalling me The Martian (Weir novel)".

== 32 Years of Robot Rebel ==
In "32 Years of Robot Rebel" (original Korean title: "로봇 반란 32년"), a man who discovers a mysterious network packet tries to find out its meaning in a futuristic society where robots are in charge of all infant care.

=== Plot summary ===
A man lives in a society where robots are in charge of all infant care. It originally began with an automatic cradle which was made by a washing machine manufacturer who developed a motor system controlled by an artificial intelligence resembling human hands. Then it developed into a fully automated newborn infant care robot through several technological innovations. This results in new social issues, such as an upper class who prefers human nannies to a robot system, a generational gap caused by educational differences from version updates of software used in robot nannies, a robot memory backup facility called "cemetery" used by people who do not want to throw away their robot nannies after reaching adulthood etc.

One day, this man, working in a communication company, discovers a mysterious network packet, but fails to understand its meaning. 32 years later, after his retirement, he tries to study the mysterious packet once again. The packet finally turns out to be an educational program sent to the robot nannies, instructing them to raise the children to have their personalities be a certain way, so that they eventually vote for a specific person to become president of the nation. This president, who is actually a cyborg controlled by an artificial intelligence, invites the man and asks him not to disclose this story, since everything in this society is beneficial to the people as it is and they like his regime so much that they elected him as the first emperor.

=== Critical response ===
Dcdc, a writer, praised it as "recommendable with regard to AlphaGo".
