= Kwak Jaesik =

South Korean novelist, science fiction writer and chemist

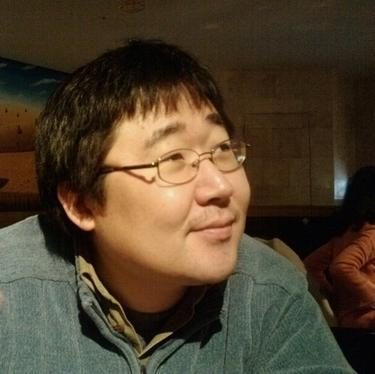
- Kwak Jaesik in 2012
- Occupations: Novelist, Chemist
- Writing career
- Period: 2006-

- Kwak Jaesik
- Hangul: 곽재식
- Hanja: 郭財植
- RR: Gwak Jaesik
- MR: Kwak Chaesik

Kwak Jaesik (Korean: 곽재식; Hanja: 郭財植) is a South Korean novelist, science fiction writer and chemist. His pen name is Gerecter. He is best known for stories of ordinary people with plot twists of science fiction or fantasy elements. Some of his work has been adapted to television drama and comics.

Kwak has also written experimental literature including 140 Character Stories (140자 소설) posted on a Twitter account, which was featured on an EBS radio show's introduction.

== Bibliography ==
- I'd Really Like to Marry You (Tangsin kwa kkok kyŏrhon hago sipsŭmnida), Onuju, 2013, ISBN 9788998711016
- The Book of Assassination (Mosalgi), Onuju, 2013, ISBN 9788998711023
- Heart of a Con Man Beats Slowly (Sagikkun ŭi simjang ŭn ch'ŏnch'ŏnhi ttwinda), RHK, 2014, ISBN 9788925554747
- The Story of Rebels (Yŏkchŏkchŏn), RHK, 2014, ISBN 9788925555041
- The Final Last of the Ultimate End (Choihu ŭi majimak kyŏrmal ŭi ggŭt), Opus Press, 2015, ISBN 9791195145485
- 140 Character Stories (Baeksasibja sosŏl), Goofic, 2016, ISBN 9791195651498
- Surviving in Robot Republic (Robot gonghwaguk esŏ salanamgi), Goofic, 2016, ISBN 9791195651481
- Aria of Rabbit (Tokki ŭi aria), Arzak, 2017, ISBN 9791187206521
- The Case of the Creepiest Story (Gajang musŏun iyagi sagŏn), Elixir, 2017, ISBN 9788954648363
- Planet Ferris Wheel (Haengsŏng daegwanramcha), Gravity Fiction, 2017, ISBN 9791196250102

== Critical response ==
Jiro Hong praised him as "master of science fiction love comedy" and "master of introducing old story". However he also criticized his mystery novel, saying it is "too simple for a full-length book".
