= Pengsoo =

South Korean TV character

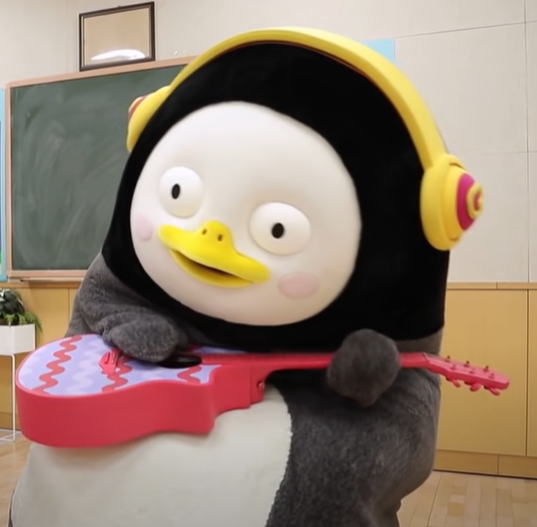
- First appearance: Tok!Tok! Boni, Hani; March 20, 2019
- Created by: Lee Seulyena (EBS Producer)

In-universe information
- Full name: Pengsoo
- Species: Giant Penguin
- Gender: Genderless
- Occupation: Content creator (EBS Trainee)
- Affiliation: Educational Broadcasting System
- Family: Unnamed mother and father
- Origin: Antarctica
- Home: A corner of the EBS prop room

Pengsoo (Korean: 펭수, Pengsu) is a penguin character that appears on the YouTube channel Giant Peng TV, run by Educational Broadcasting System (EBS) in South Korea. Pengsoo is a ten-year-old trainee at EBS who dreams of being a universal superstar.

The popularity of Pengsoo, expanding outside the initial target demographic for the character, has resulted in Pengsoo appearing in television programs, games, radio programs, advertising, government PSAs, and on multiple branded products both physical and digital.

On January 29, 2020, Giant Peng TV (자이언트 펭TV), Pengsoo's YouTube channel, reached 2 million subscribers.

== History ==
Educational Broadcasting System (EBS) first conceptualized Pengsoo as a character "the whole family could like" and was originally designed to target a demographic of children in South Korea around 10 years old. While EBS had significant success with children's programming, the company had generally targeted a younger age group with simple, "cute and cuddly" personas such as Pororo the Little Penguin. Pengsoo was intentionally written with a personality more akin to an antihero.

In May 2019, the number of subscribers was only 37.

Pengsoo portrays the role of an anti-hero such as a light behavior or an honest expression of jealousy. It breaks existing social norms in Korea and contrasts with another famous penguin character on EBS, Pororo the Little Penguin, who is a more gentle creature. It began to gain popularity as he appeared with other characters in the program called EBS Athletics Championships (E-Yuk Dae), and the scene of complaining about the name of EBS's president Kim Myung-joong without hesitation gained a great response from office workers.

Currently, it is called the PO-president of adults. Pengsoo appeals to Kidults and has built a fan base of more than 2 million YouTube subscribers.

== Character ==
According to the self-introduction on the official website, Pengsoo is 10 years old and currently is an EBS trainee. According to Pengsoo in its audition video, it said that it had been swimming in Antarctica to become the best creator, then crash-landed in Switzerland to learn the yodeling song and swim from Switzerland to the coast of Incheon, and he wanted to be like Pororo of EBS. Pengsoo is deliberately genderless, and the height of Pengsoo is 2m 10 cm. In addition, Pengsoo is described as using Pengsoo's own toilets and showers.

== Media appearances ==
It also entered the 2021 EBS College Scholastic Ability Test (CSAT) special lecture and was featured as the EBS PerfectScore Workbook cover model, which was released in 2020. Pengsoo was selected as a presenter for the 34th Golden Disk Awards and has made content with K-Pop group Twice.

== Popularity and influence ==
Pengsoo's rise in popularity is largely credited to its unique character. It has been described as rude, back-talking, and brazen. Within a nine-month span in 2019 - 2020, Pengsoo generated 10 billion won (approx. 7.6 million USD) in revenue. In 2019, Pengsoo's popularity was cited in increased searches by South Koreans of travel to Ushuaia, a point close to Antarctica allowing for wildlife viewing such as penguins. Pengsoo was chosen as the "Animal of the year 2020". Pengsoo is one of the most influential penguins in South Korea currently. The official fandom name of Pengsoo is "Peng Club" (펭클럽).

In 2019, Pengsoo beat BTS to become South Korea's "Person of the Year".

== Government-related appearances ==
Pengsoo has received attention from the South Korean government, and was invited to the Ministry of Foreign Affairs and met Minister Kang Kyung-wha on November 6, 2019, to promote a special summit between South Korea and the ten-member Association of Southeast Asian Nations. has shot many TV commercials and public advertisements for encouragement, cheering on the public during the COVID-19 pandemic.

- Pengsoo COVID-19 cheering
- Pengsoo's the right way to wash your hand
- Pengsoo Vote encouragement

== Buzzwords ==
Pengsoo is credited with popularizing buzzwords like "눈치챙겨 [keep your wits], 엣헴엣헴 [ahem], 신이나 [it's fun/I'm having fun], 펭러뷰 [Peng(soo) loves you], 펭하 [Peng hi], 펭빠 [Peng bye]"

== Merchandise and licensing ==
The Pengsoo character has a large variety of merchandise and has been licensed with multiple products. Pengsoo Mall, a website hosting many of Pengsoo's official products, has featured Pengsoo branded fashion, kitchen, bathroom, beauty, technology, and food products. Pengsoo has appeared on debit cards, Companies who successfully secure licensing for the character saw increased stock trading activity and rising stock price in 2019, with the cost to win a bid to license the character being compared to the same cost to the rights to popular Disney characters. Pengsoo also made an appearance as a playable character in Nexon's mobile game KartRider Rush+ since November 26, 2020. A digital sticker pack released on KakaoTalk featuring Pengsoo became a bestseller immediately upon release.

In March 2020, EBS announced an effort to legally target copyright infringements of Pengsoo.

== Discography ==
=== As a lead artist ===
Title	Year	Peak chart positions	Album
Title	Year	KOR	Album
"This Is Pengsoo" (펭수로 하겠습니다) with Tiger JK, Bizzy, Bibi	2020	54	Billboard Project Vol. 1
"Christmas Returns" (크리스마스 리턴즈) with Kim Tae-woo (g.o.d), Park Jin-joo, Yoon Sang	2020	152	Non-album single

== Filmography ==
=== Television show ===
Year	Title	Role	Notes	Ref.
2022	Scholarship Quiz	Special MC	with Jaejae	
2022	The Perfect Age for Politics, Thirteen	Narrator	with Kim Su-ji	
