= Hwang Seok-jeong =

South Korean actress (born 1971)

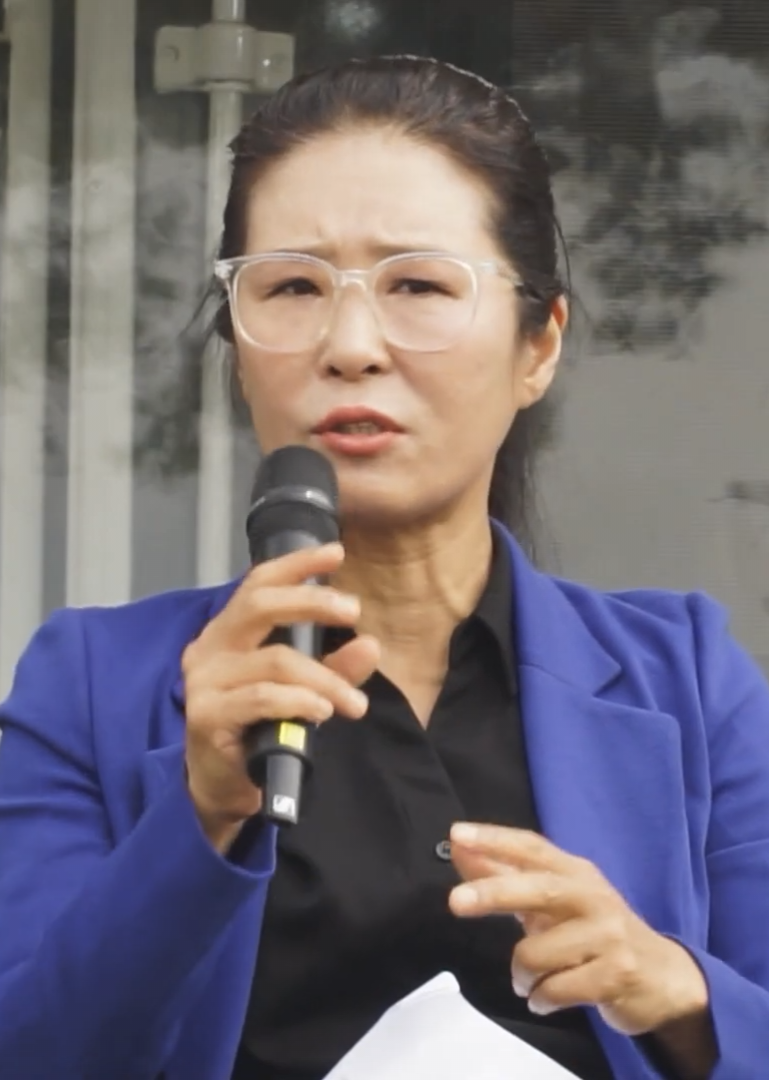
- Hwang in October 2025
- Born: February 2, 1971 (age 55); Saha District, Busan, South Korea
- Occupations: Actress; professor
- Years active: 2001–present

Korean name
- Hangul: 황석정
- Hanja: 黃石正
- RR: Hwang Seokjeong
- MR: Hwang Sŏkchŏng

Hwang Seok-jeong (born February 2, 1971) is a South Korean actress. She has mostly played supporting roles in films and television series, notably Secret Love (2013), Misaeng: Incomplete Life (2014) and She Was Pretty (2015).

== Filmography ==
=== Film ===
Year	Title	Role
2001	Take Care of My Cat	Village chief ajumma/Female beggar
2002	Jungle Juice	Seagull 1
2004	Twentidentity	
2004	The Last Wolf	Track coach
2004	Dance with the Wind	Nurse Hee-sun
2004	Ghost House	Super hostess
2004	A Bad Son (short film)	
2005	Mr. Housewife	Housewife Yang Sung-ja
2006	Lost in Love	Hye-jung
2006	Les Formidables	Detective Hwang
2006	How the Lack of Love Affects Two Men	Super woman
2007	The Perfect Couple	Female writer
2008	Crazy Waiting	Korean history teacher
2008	My Love Yurie	San Do-jeok's woman/ Miss Korea contestant/ Miss Korea moderator
2008	Hello, Schoolgirl	Professor Ha
2009	Going to Mars	
2010	The Yellow Sea	Dollar dealer
2011	Funny Neighbors	Ok Ok-ja
2012	The Suck Up Project: Mr. XXX-Kisser	Ajumma at insurance office
2012	A Company Man	Cafe owner
2012	Family Cinema	Owner's wife
2013	48M	Ri Soon-bok
2013	Dead And	Yeon-moo
2013	The Fake	Young-sun's mother
2014	Yoon-hee	Myung-ja
2014	The Satellite Girl and Milk Cow	Witch of the North (voice)
2014	My Brilliant Life	Hallelujah 1
2014	Shining Modern History	Sooni's mom (voice)
2015	Crown Princess Hong	
2016	Unforgettable	Gae-deok's mother
2018	Keys to the Heart	Department Head Kang
2019	Rosebud	Han Myung-hee
2022	2037	Li-ra

=== Television series ===
Year	Title	Role
2007	Two Outs in the Ninth Inning	Jang Choo-ja
2007	S Clinic	Gae Jak-doo
2008	Erotic Actress's Murder Case	Teacher Park
2009	Raw Family Tutta Family	Ma-tu
2010	Secret Garden	Korean dry sauna owner
2011	KBS Drama Special: "For Her Son"	Myung-hwa
2011	Love Roser	Ma-ri
2012	The Innocent Man	Neighbor Ajumma (cameo)
2013	The Queen of Office	Han Beom-man
2013	Secret Love	Sandra Hwang
2014	Wonderful Days	Choi Jae-sook
2014	Diary of a Night Watchman	Dangkol Eomi
2014	Discovery of Love	Restaurant owner
2014	Misaeng: Incomplete Life	Kim Sun-joo
2014	4 Legendary Witches	Oh Man-bok's wife
2014	Schoolgirl Detectives	Lee Yeo-joo
2015	Persevere, Goo Hae-ra	Writer Eom
2015	Beating Again	Patient's mother (guest)
2015	Let's Eat 2	Kim Mi-ran
2015	Save the Family	Seorim Hospital cook
2015	Mask	Hwang Mal-ja
2015	The Time We Were Not in Love	Airline passenger with dog (guest, episode 3)
2015	She Was Pretty	Kim Ra-ra
2016	Cheese in the Trap	Professor Kang
2016	My Lawyer, Mr. Jo	Hwang Ae-ra
2016	W	Webtoon writer (cameo)
2016	Guardian: The Lonely and Great God	Ghost
2017	Ruby Ruby Love	Dan Ho-bak
2017	The Rebel	Wol Ha-mae
2017	Temperature of Love	Park Eun-sung
2017	Because This Is My First Life	Writer Hwang
2018	The Miracle We Met	Lim Do-hee
2018	Your Honor	Lee Ha-yeon
2022	Ghost Doctor	Mrs. Kim
2022	Jinxed at First	
2023–2024	Like Flowers in Sand	Lim Hyun-ja
2023	Tale of the Nine Tailed 1938	
2024	Love Song for Illusion	Chung-ta

=== Variety show ===
Year	Title	Notes/Ref.
2014	Kang Yong-suk's Gosohan 19	
2015	Red Handbag	
2015	Mom Is Watching	Cast member
2018	King of Mask Singer	Contestant - Tower Bridge (Episode 151)
2022	Love Machine	Narrator / nature documentary

== Musical theatre ==
Year	Title	Korean Title	Role	Notes/Ref.
2021	King Lear	리어왕		
2023	The Dressing Room	분장실	A	

== Awards and nominations ==
Year	Award	Category	Nominated work	Result
2015	4th APAN Star Awards	Best Supporting Actress	She Was Pretty	Nominated
2015	34th MBC Drama Awards	Best Supporting Actress in a Miniseries	She Was Pretty	Won
2017	SBS Drama Awards	Best Supporting Actress	Temperature of Love	Nominated
