= O'Clock (EP) =

EP by Park Ji-hoon
- Released: March 26, 2019
- Genre: K-pop
- Language: Korean
- Label: Maroo Entertainment

Singles from O'Clock
- 1. "L.O.V.E" Released: March 26, 2019

O'Clock is the debut extended play by South Korean singer Park Ji-hoon. The album was released on March 26, 2019, by Maroo Entertainment.

== Background and release ==
On February 19, 2019, it was announced by Maroo Entertainment that Park was aiming for a March solo debut. On March 7, it was confirmed that he would be making his solo debut on the 26th. The album name and comeback scheduler were released on March 11. The concept photos were released over the following days, with the tracklist being revealed on the 18th. A showcase to promote the comeback was held at Sangmyung University on March 26, the same day as the album's release.

== Promotion ==
The title track and single "L.O.V.E" was not performed on any Korean music shows, due to conflicts of schedule with Park's filming of the drama Flower Crew: Joseon Marriage Agency, but it received one win on the show Music Bank.

== Reception ==
The EP was well received by the public, with the publication Star News calling the title track "a refreshing R&B song." O'Clock reached #1 on 11 iTunes album charts, including Hong Kong, Thailand, Taiwan, Indonesia, Malaysia, Singapore, and the Philippines. It reached a peak of #2 on the Gaon Album Chart, and "L.O.V.E" reached a peak of #59 on the Gaon Digital Chart.

== Track listing ==
No.	Title	Lyrics	Music	Arrangement	Length
1.	"The Beginning Of..."	텐조(Tenzo)	텐조(Tenzo); MUNA; LOOGONE	LOOGONE; MUNA	1:26
2.	"US"	원택(1Take); 탁(TAK)	원택(1Take); 탁(TAK)	원택(1Take); 탁(TAK)	3:50
3.	"L.O.V.E"	텐조(Tenzo); 키비; ROUN	텐조(Tenzo); LOOGONE; MUNA	MUNA; LOOGONE	3:35
4.	"Would You..."	Lovee	Brian Cho; Lovee; Shaun Kim	Shaun Kim; Brian Cho; Gallon	3:07
5.	"Moon"	키비; 텐조(Tenzo)	텐조(Tenzo); FIXMAN	FIXMAN; 텐조(Tenzo)	3:21
6.	"Young 20" (Prod. Lee Dae-hwi)	이대휘; 박지훈	이대휘; XEPY; 5$	5$; SFRM	3:17
Total length:					18:37

== Charts ==
Chart (2019)	Peak position
South Korean Albums (Gaon)	2
