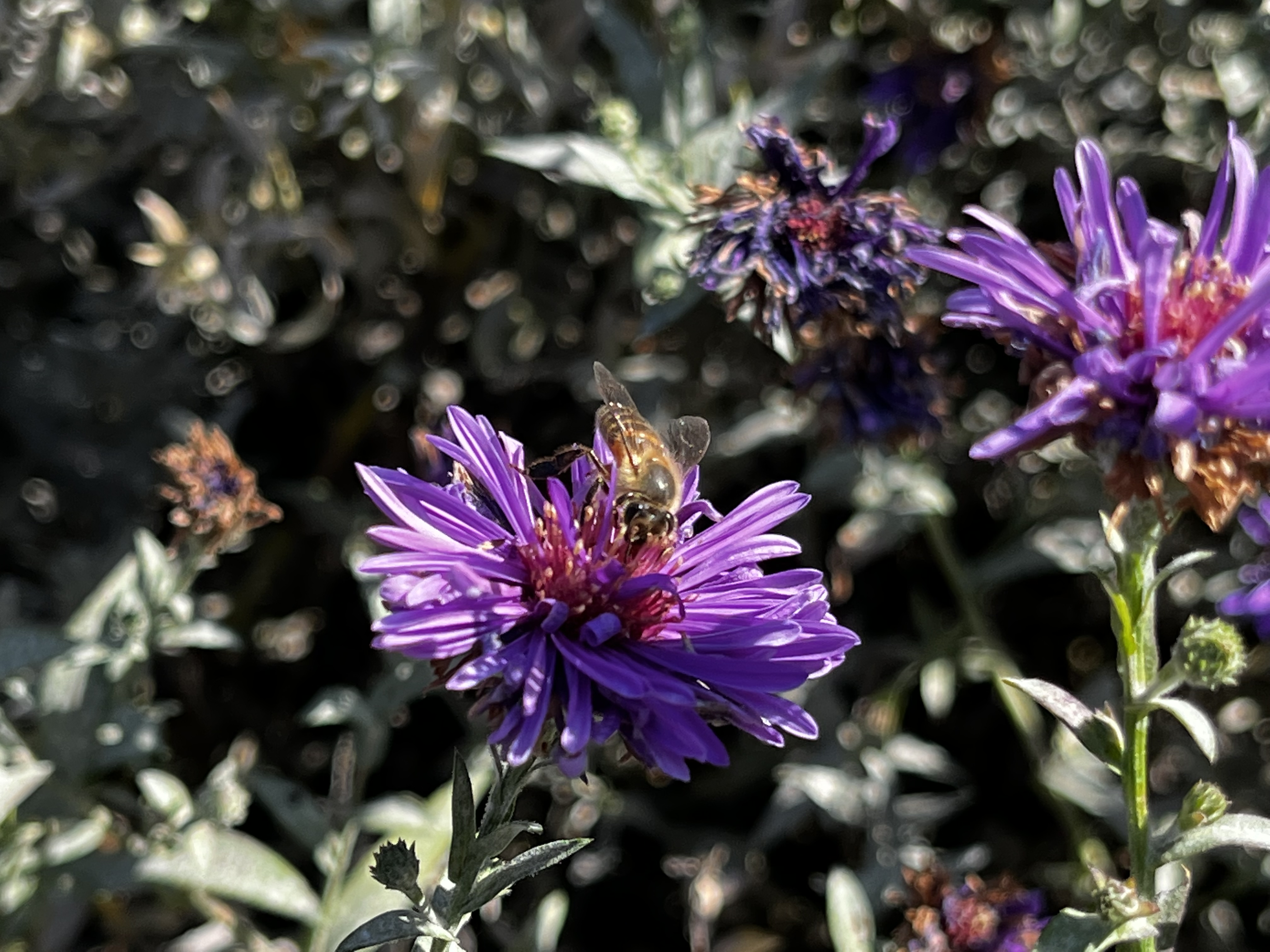

Scientific classification
- Kingdom: Animalia
- Phylum: Arthropoda
- Clade: Pancrustacea
- Class: Insecta
- Order: Hymenoptera
- Family: Apidae
- Genus: Apis
- Species: A. cerana
- Subspecies: A. c. cerana

Trinomial name
- Apis cerana cerana Fabricius, 1793

= Apis cerana cerana =

Subspecies of bee

Apis cerana cerana, also known as the Chinese honey bee, is the nominotypical subspecies of the eastern honey bee (Apis cerana). This subspecies is an endemic honey bee genetic resource of China. In 2006, it was included in the National List of Livestock and Poultry Genetic Resources for Conservation. The Chinese honey bee plays a key pollinator role in forest communities dominated by broad-leaved trees and in traditional agroecosystems, and is of great value for maintaining mountain biodiversity and increasing agricultural production.

== Distribution ==
Apis cerana cerana is widely distributed in central-eastern, northern, central, and southern mainland China (excluding Hainan Island), and may extend into northern South Asia (e.g., northern India).

== Morphological characteristics ==
The Chinese honey bee has a relatively small body. Worker bees have a body length of 10–13 mm, a black head and thorax, a yellowish-black abdomen, and are covered with yellowish-brown hairs; the average tongue length is 5 mm. Queens have a body length of 13–16 mm and exhibit two body color types: one type has distinct brownish-yellow rings between abdominal segments, appearing dark brown overall; the other type lacks obvious brownish-yellow rings on the abdomen, appearing entirely black. Drones are generally black, with a body length of approximately 11–13.5 mm. Southern populations are typically smaller in body size than northern populations.

The hind tibiae of worker bees have a pollen basket on the outer side, and the fourth to seventh abdominal sternites possess wax mirrors (wax gland secretion areas). The stinger is specialized from the ovipositor, with barbs at the tip, and is easily detached after stinging. Compared with the western honey bee (Apis mellifera), the Chinese honey bee has a shorter proboscis, more wing vein variation, but more developed hairs on the abdominal tergites, which corresponds to its adaptation to low temperatures and its ability to efficiently collect scattered nectar sources.

== Behavior ==
=== Foraging behavior ===
Chinese honey bees leave the hive early and return late. In spring and summer, workers typically start foraging about 30–60 minutes earlier than Italian honey bees and return about 1–2 hours later in the evening, resulting in a total daily foraging time 2–3 hours longer than that of Italian honey bees. Chinese honey bees have a keen sense of smell and can detect and utilize scattered, sparsely flowering low shrubs and herbaceous plants, such as those in the Brassicaceae, Rosaceae, Asteraceae, and Cucurbitaceae families. After the main nectar flow ends, they can still rely on minor nectar sources to maintain colony reproduction without needing to be transported to new locations. The foraging range is typically 1–2 km, but can expand to 3–4 km when nectar is scarce.

=== Temperature and humidity adaptation ===
Chinese honey bees exhibit outstanding cold tolerance. Workers can normally leave the hive to forage at air temperatures around 7°C, and the Aba Chinese honey bee even becomes active at 3–4°C. In contrast, the lower safety threshold for foraging in Italian honey bees is 11°C. This cold tolerance allows Chinese honey bees to pollinate plants that bloom in early spring and late autumn, such as Eurya, Elsholtzia, and Brassicaceae species, which are often not effectively visited by western honey bees. In summer high temperatures, Chinese honey bees maintain hive temperatures between 33–36°C through behaviors such as collective fanning at the hive entrance by workers and evaporative cooling by bringing in water.

=== Social behavior and defense ===
Chinese honey bees possess a unique "mite grooming behavior". When a worker bee is parasitized by a mite (e.g., Varroa destructor), the infected bee will violently shake its abdomen and emit specific sound waves, attracting nestmates to remove the mite. This mechanism provides natural resistance to Varroa mites, eliminating the need for chemical treatments.

Against their natural enemy, the wasp, Chinese honey bees have evolved multiple defense strategies. The peak activity period of wasps is around 11:00, whereas Chinese honey bees have shifted their peak foraging time to 10:00, thus temporally avoiding wasps. When a wasp approaches the hive entrance, guard bees line up and synchronously vibrate their wings, producing a "hissing" sound to intimidate. If a wasp forcibly enters, dozens of worker bees will surround it and generate heat through aggregation, causing the wasp to overheat and die. Chinese honey bees are smaller and more agile in flight; when encountering a wasp in the air, they can quickly hide in grass or between branches and leaves, whereas Italian honey bees, being larger and slower, are easily captured by wasps.

Chinese honey bees do not collect propolis, so gaps in the hive must be sealed with plastic tape or mud to prevent invasion by wax moths (greater wax moth, Galleria mellonella). Wax moths are one of the main pests of Chinese honey bees; their larvae tunnel into combs, eating wax and pollen, and can cause colony absconding in severe cases. Chinese honey bees are prone to gnawing on old combs, a behavior that helps remove wax moth eggs and larvae but also accelerates comb aging, requiring beekeepers to regularly replace combs.

=== Reproduction and swarming ===
Chinese honey bees have a strong natural swarming tendency. In spring and early summer (and also in autumn in some southern regions), when the colony reaches a certain size (typically 4–6 frames) and external nectar sources are abundant, the colony builds 7–15 queen cells. The old queen leaves the hive with about half the worker bees shortly after the first queen cell is capped, seeking a new nesting site. After the new queen emerges in the original hive, secondary or even tertiary swarming may occur. The strong swarming tendency makes it difficult for Chinese honey bees to maintain very large colony sizes (usually less than half the size of an Italian honey bee colony), but it also gives them a strong capacity for population dispersal and habitat colonization.

During dearth periods or when severely disturbed by enemies, Chinese honey bees are prone to whole-colony absconding (abandoning the nest). Before absconding, the colony stops brood rearing and consumes stored honey, then leaves the hive all at once. This is an extreme strategy for coping with harsh environments and an important mechanism for wild populations to survive. Robbing behavior in bees is also relatively common in Chinese honey bees; when external nectar sources are scarce, some strong colonies may attack the entrances of weaker colonies, stealing stored honey and even causing the robbed colony's destruction. Therefore, preventing robbing is a key aspect of Chinese honey bee management.

== Research ==
Whole-genome resequencing studies have revealed significant genetic differentiation among Chinese honey bee populations from different geographical regions in China. Physical barriers (mountains, straits), rather than geographic distance, are the main drivers of population divergence. Historical effective population sizes are highly correlated with paleoclimatic fluctuations, with population expansion during warm periods and contraction during cold periods. Selective sweep analysis identified the RAPTOR gene as a key gene for climatic adaptation, regulating body size via the mTOR signaling pathway in response to different temperatures and food abundances.

Studies on caste differentiation have shown that there are 414 differentially expressed genes between newly emerged queens and workers. Ribosomal protein genes are upregulated in workers, possibly in preparation for royal jelly secretion. These results are highly conserved with the caste differentiation mechanisms of the western honey bee. Additionally, using microsatellite markers and mitochondrial DNA analysis, Chinese honey bees within China can be divided into at least several genetic clusters, including Central China, South China, Yunnan-Guizhou Plateau, Aba, and Hainan, which largely coincide with the nine Chinese honey bee local breeds listed in the National List of Livestock and Poultry Genetic Resources for Conservation.

== Conservation status ==
Since the introduction of the Italian honey bee to China in 1896, the Chinese honey bee has declined dramatically due to exotic competition, deforestation, and pesticide misuse. By the early 21st century, its distribution range had shrunk by more than 75%, and population numbers had dropped by over 80%. North of the Yellow River, it remains only in a few mountainous areas, and it has become extinct in Xinjiang, the Greater Khingan Range, and the plains of the Yangtze River Basin.

To reverse this trend, China established Chinese honey bee reserves in five provinces, including Heilongjiang, Guangdong, and Hubei, starting in 2008. The latest edition of the National List of Livestock and Poultry Genetic Resources for Conservation, issued by the Ministry of Agriculture and Rural Affairs in 2024, lists 12 honey bee breeds as national protected breeds: Northern Chinese Honey Bee, Southern Chinese Honey Bee, Central Chinese Honey Bee, Yunnan-Guizhou Plateau Chinese Honey Bee, Changbai Mountain Chinese Honey Bee, Hainan Chinese Honey Bee, Southern Yunnan Chinese Honey Bee, Aba Chinese Honey Bee, Tibetan Chinese Honey Bee, Batang Chinese Honey Bee, Northeast Black Bee, and Xinjiang Black Bee.
