= Ha Sung-woon =

South Korean singer (born 1994)

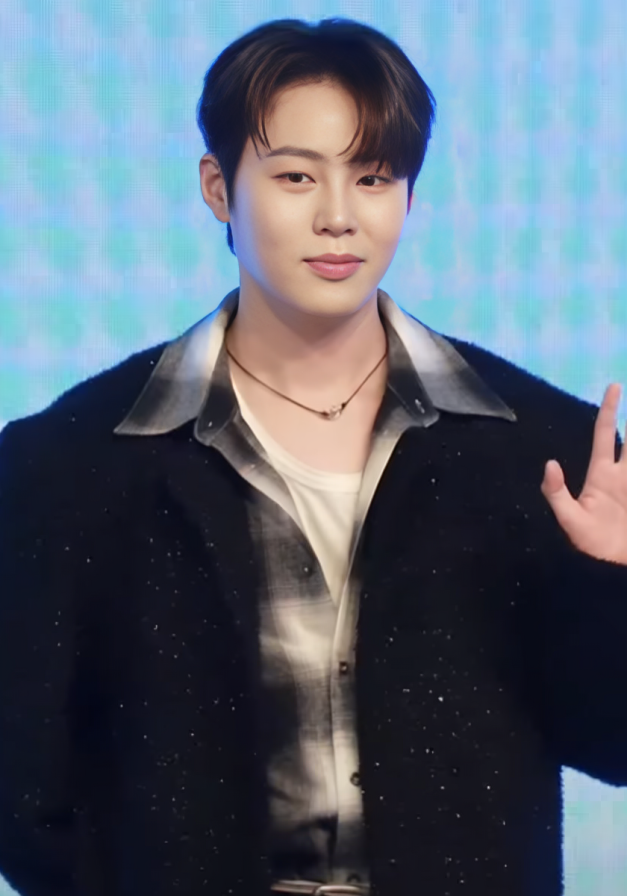
- Ha in October 2024
- Born: March 22, 1994 (age 32); Goyang, Gyeonggi Province, South Korea
- Education: Dong-ah Institute of Media and Arts
- Occupations: Singer; songwriter
- Years active: 2014–present
- Musical career
- Genres: K-pop; hip hop
- Instrument: Vocals
- Labels: Star Crew; BPM; YMC (Note: As a member of Wanna One only.); Swing
- Formerly of: Wanna One; Hotshot

Korean name
- Hangul: 하성운
- Hanja: 河成雲
- RR: Ha Seongun
- MR: Ha Sŏngun

Signature
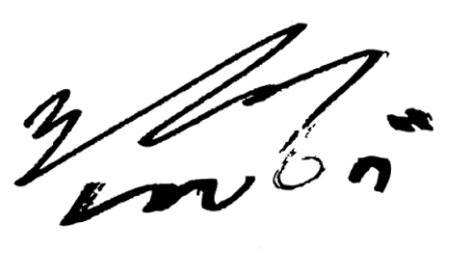

Ha Sung-woon (Korean: 하성운; born March 22, 1994), also known mononymously as Sungwoon, is a South Korean singer and songwriter. He is best known as a member of South Korean boy group Wanna One, as a member of boy group Hotshot, and currently as a solo artist. In 2019, he began his solo music career with his first extended play My Moment.

== Career ==
=== Prior to 2017 ===
Ha joined Star Crew Entertainment (formerly known as Ardor&Able) and debuted with Hotshot as main vocalist on October 29, 2014, with a digital single "Take a Shot".

=== 2017–2018: Produce 101 and Wanna One ===
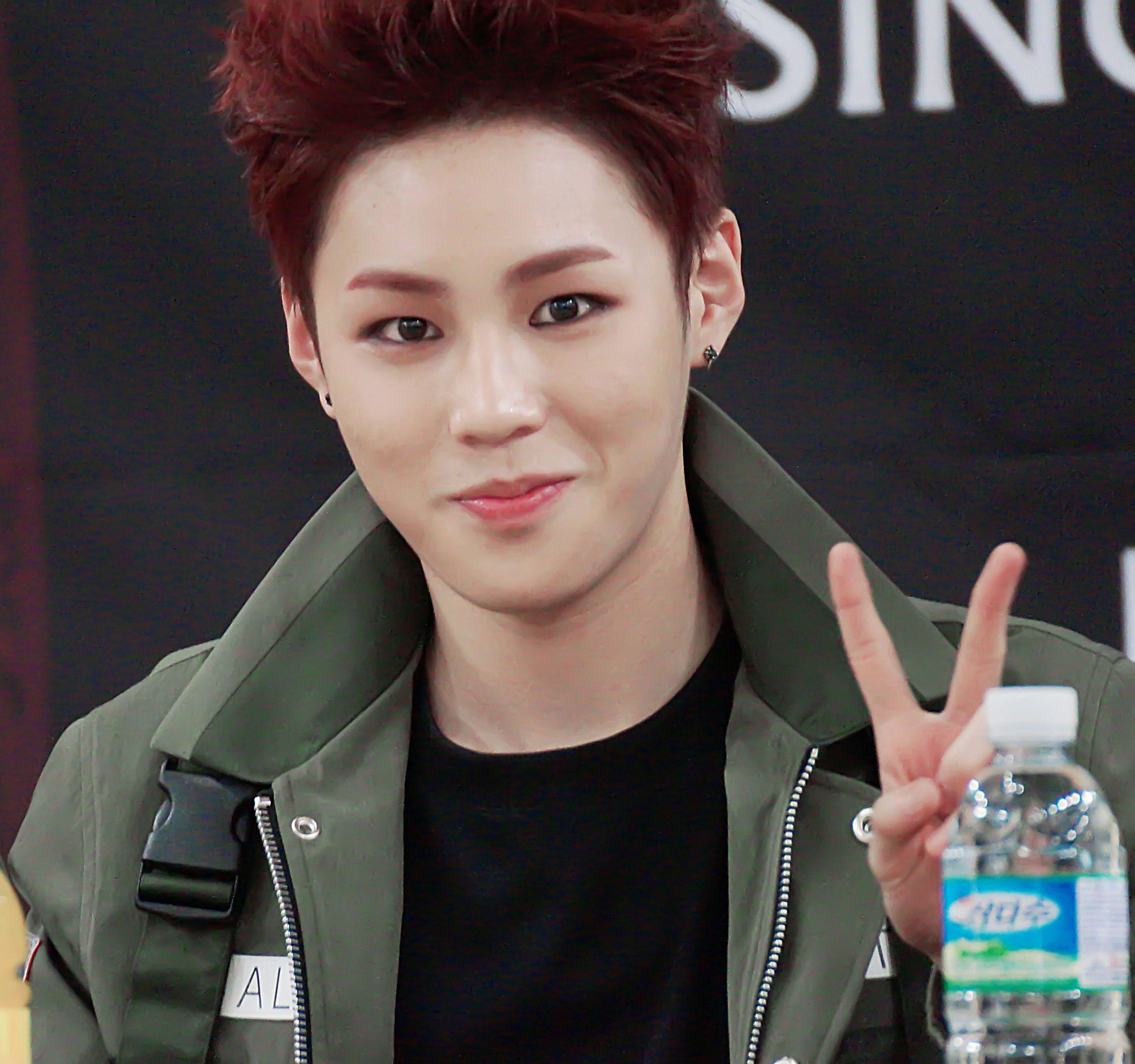
Ha at a fansigning event in 2015

Ha and Roh Tae-hyun represented Ardor&Able Entertainment in the boy group reality survival show, Produce 101 Season 2 which aired on Mnet from April 7 until June 16, 2017. In the final concert that took place on July 1 and 2, 2017, at Olympic Hall in Seoul, Ha managed to gain 790,302 votes and was announced as the final member of the project boy group Wanna One under YMC Entertainment.

Ha debuted with Wanna One during Wanna One Premier Show-Con on August 7, 2017, at the Gocheok Sky Dome with a mini-album 1×1=1 (To Be One). He was also in the sub-group Lean on Me with Hwang Min-hyun and Yoon Ji-sung, performing the song "Forever and a Day" produced by Nell. The subunit was announced on the first day of Wanna One Go: X-Con, and the song was included on Wanna One's album 1÷x=1 (Undivided).

During his time with Wanna One, Ha was invited to join several TV programs, such as the eighth episode of SBS variety show Master Key, Law of the Jungle Sabah, which aired from July 27 to September 21, 2018, and MBC singing competition program King of Masked Singer, in which he got to the third round with his rendition of "Smile Again" by Rumble fish, "Drifting Apart" by Nell, and "Appearance" by Kim Bum-soo.

His contract with Wanna One ended on December 31, 2018, but he still appeared with the group until their final concerts (titled "Therefore") held across four days, ending on January 27, 2019, at the Gocheok Sky Dome in Seoul, where the group held their debut showcase.

=== 2019: Graduation, solo debut, and solo activities ===
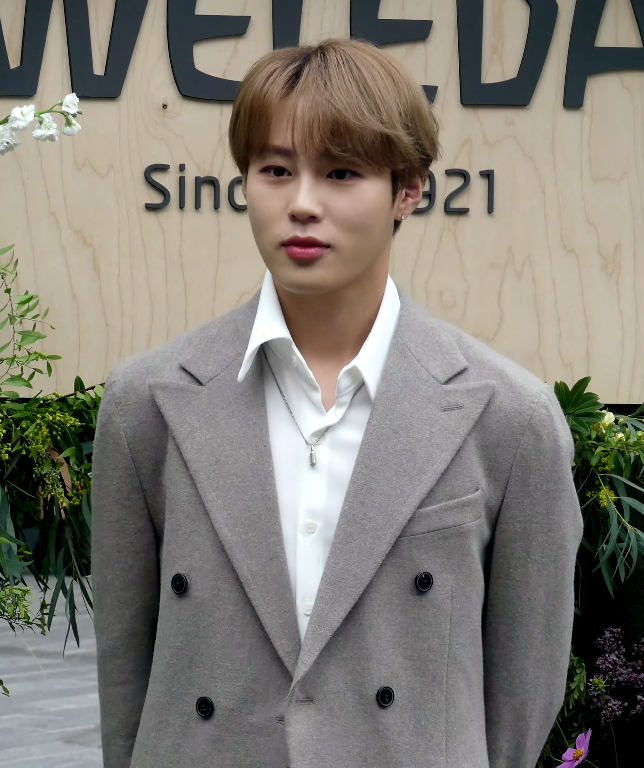
Ha at the Weleda Korea launching event in 2019

On January 28, Ha unveiled his self-composed song "Don't Forget" featuring former Wanna One member Park Ji-hoon. "Don't Forget" was released as a pre-release track from his EP My Moment, with lyrics about wishing to cherish memories with loved ones.

The singer began his solo activity by announcing his first two-day fan-meeting, "My Moment", which was held from March 8–9 at the SK Olympic Handball Gymnasium in Olympic Park, Seoul. The tickets went on sale on February 20 and sold out within two minutes of the pre-order becoming available. He was also scheduled to meet fans in six Asian cities including Tokyo on March 17, Osaka on the March 19, Taipei on March 23, Bangkok on March 30, Hong Kong on April 5, Macao on June 8, and Jakarta on June 22. While preparing for his solo debut, Ha showed his bright side in the interview and pictorial with The Star Magazine. He also did a photoshoot with Allure magazine, where he mentioned the EP. In between his schedule, the singer attended his graduation ceremony at the Dong-ah Institute of Media and Arts on February 22, 2019.

My Moment was released on February 28, 2019, featuring the upbeat lead single "Bird". The singer held a showcase at Live Hall in Gwangjin District, Seoul on February 27. The album consists of five tracks, which were all written and composed by Ha himself. He also served as the executive producer and participated in the production process, such as mixing and mastering. Hanteo reported that 45,600 copies of the album were sold on the first day of release, making My Moment the third-highest first-day sales for an album. It also became the first number one on the Gaon retail album chart, which began on March 4. My Moment topped the ninth week (February 24 – March 2) of the main Gaon Album Chart, and ranked first on the daily charts of February 28, March 2, and March 3. On March 1, Ha performed the songs "Bird" and "Tell Me I Love You" at One K Concert—a three-day music and art festival—at the Yeouido Parliament House grass field, which was held to commemorate the hundredth anniversary of the March 1 Movement and aims to spread the hopes of the reunification of the Korean Peninsula and peace in Northeast Asia and the world.

He was also appointed as a guest MC for SBS Inkigayo on March 2 and on March 13, Ha took the trophy on his first solo with the song "Bird" on Show Champion Ha sang the Korean national anthem at the 17th KTMF 2019 (the annual K Pop Festival which was held by the Korea Daily) and also perform three songs ("Bird", "Tell Me I Love You", and "Magic Castle") in front of more than twenty thousands spectators at the Hollywood Bowl in Los Angeles.

Beside his vocal and dance skills, Ha demonstrated his ability as a DJ in the MBC Radio program Idol Radio on April 18, with JBJ95 as a guest. He also participated in several donation programs and projects. He became MC together with Kim Hee-ae, and former Wanna One member Lee Dae-hwi for MBC 2019 New Life for Children on May 5 at Sangam MBC public hall, which has been held 29 times since the beginning of 1990. It is the best domestic donation program which aims to delivers hope to children suffering from diseases such as rare and incurable diseases Ha's fans hoped to convey their love for children by donating KRW 27 million or US$27733 and became the highest donor during the event

In addition to his music related promotion and activities, Ha also donated his voice in EBS literature program 'Linking Hearts through the Voices of Idol Stars', the first project to combine idol readings and donations which aims to raise interest in Korean literature and create a new reading culture through the public readings. Hawas the second idol invited to join this special project after Chungha. He read a novel written by Jun Sun-ok, "Ramen is cool" (라면은멋있다) and expressed his gratitude for being able to participate in such a meaningful project.

On May 12, Ha became a cast member in the SBS pilot program Bistro the noble (격조식당), a food variety program that sets the ultimate food with the finest ingredients which are produced by famous people from all over the country. He also became a line up in several concerts and festivals, such as: KCON 2019 Japan, Dream Concert 2019 which was held at the Seoul World Cup Stadium on May 18 (to promote 'dreams and hopes' to Korean youth), and the 13th Seoul Jazz Festival which was held at the SK Olympic Handball Gymnasium May 26.

Ha has sung several OSTs, including "Think of You" for tvN drama Her Private Life, "Immunity" for JTBC drama The wind blows, and "Because of You" for JTBC drama Flower Crew.

On June 5, Ha unveiled his self-composed song "Riding" featuring Dynamic Duo Gaeko, a pre-release track his second EP, BXXX, which was later released on July 8. The EP featured the medium tempo lead single "Blue" which shows a dramatic change in the song with an explosive vocal. The album consists of five tracks, of which four were written and composed by Ha. "Blue" was composed by Joombas (Hyuk Shin, KYUM LYK, and JJ Evans), while Ha gave his contribution as the lyricist. Hanteo reported that 66,056 copies of the album were sold on the first week of release.

Ha held his very first solo concert 'Dive in Color' in Seoul's Jamsil Indoor Stadium, one of the five biggest concert halls in Korea, from July 26 to 27. The pre-sale tickets were sold out shortly after it opened. He also held his concert at Busan BEXCO 1st Exhibition Hall on August 3, and in Tokyo, Japan, from September 12 to 13. On October 5, Sungwoon partnered up with renowned producer and composer Yoon Sang and released a collaboration single "Dream of a Dream" as part of the Fever Festival. Since early November, he consistently ranks 1st in the top 10 most popular entertainer in non-drama TV field, for his variety show skill in SkyDrama - 'We Play'.

=== 2020: OST release, Twilight Zone, Mirage, and other activities ===
UNICEF Korea Committee launched the campaign 'Safe Water, Save Lives!' from March 19 to 31 to support drinking water for children in developing countries. The campaign period coincides with World Water Day which also falls on the same day as Ha's birthday, March 22. Ha actively sympathizes with the preciousness of water, and participated in the campaign video as a talent donation, appealing for warm interest and support for children suffering from contaminated drinking water. Lee Ki-chul, secretary-general of UNICEF's Korean Committee said, "I heard that Ha's name was made up of water and cloud. Ha Sung-woon, who has a special relationship with water in his birthday and his name, joined together to create a more special campaign. We ask that more people join us in this campaign to protect children's lives with clean water." The funds raised through the 'Safe Water, Save Lives!' campaign will be used to support drinking water purifiers, oral hydration supplements and hand pumps for children suffering from contaminated water.

On April 30, it was announced that Ha would be releasing an OST for the drama The King: Eternal Monarch titled "I Fall In Love" on May 2.

Ha released his third EP, Twilight Zone, on June 8, featuring the lead single "Get Ready".

For the second year now, Benefit Cosmetics Korea has announced that Ha will be the product endorser for its Love & Summer campaign dedicated for its range of Lip Tint products following the success of the first HaSungWoon x Benefit campaign in 2019. Continuing his summer activities, Ha participated in an online donation concert by MBC TV and World Vision to comfort people suffering from Coronavirus disease 2019. More recently, Ha performed in the 26th Dream Concert, one of the most anticipated concerts in Korea via livestream broadcast.

On July 28, Ha was featured in Ravi's Summer EP with the title track "Paradise".

Ha released his fourth EP, Mirage on November 9, featuring the lead single "Forbidden Island".

=== 2021: Sneakers, Select Shop, Electrified: Urban Nostalgia, and new agency ===
Ha released his fifth EP, Sneakers on June 7, featuring the lead single of the same name. The repackaged version of his fifth EP, Select Shop was released on August 9, featuring the lead single "Strawberry Gum", featuring Don Mills.

On November 2, it was reported that Ha had ended his contract with Star Crew Entertainment starting from October 31 and he decided not to renew it.

Ha released his sixth EP, Electrified: Urban Nostalgia on November 19, as his last release under Star Crew Entertainment, featuring the lead single "Electrified".

On December 24, Ha signed a contract with BPM Entertainment.

=== 2022: You and Strange World ===
On February 9, Ha released his special album, You, featuring the lead single "Can't Live Without You".

On April 14, Ha released the promotional single "La La Pop!" through Universe Music for the mobile application, Universe.

On August 24, Ha released his seventh mini-album Strange World. Ha also performed at the 'Welcome to Strange World' concert on August 27 and 28.

== Personal life ==
=== Military service ===
Ha enlisted in mandatory military service on September 5, 2022, without revealing his location and time to prevent the spread of COVID-19. On September 2, 2022, Ha was confirmed to have contracted COVID-19, causing him to postpone his military service.

On October 7, 2022, it was announced that Ha would be serving his mandatory military service as an active duty soldier on October 24, without revealing his enlistment location and time to prevent the spread of COVID-19. On April 23, 2024, Ha was discharged from military service.

== Discography ==
=== Extended plays ===
Title	Details	Peak chart positions	Sales
Title	Details	KOR	Sales
My Moment	Released: February 28, 2019; Label: Star Crew Entertainment; Formats: CD, digital download, streaming	1	KOR: 87,844
BXXX	Released: July 8, 2019; Label: Star Crew Entertainment; Formats: CD, digital download, streaming	2	KOR: 81,759
Twilight Zone	Released: June 8, 2020; Label: Star Crew Entertainment; Formats: CD, digital download, streaming	3	KOR: 76,490
Mirage	Released: November 9, 2020; Label: Star Crew Entertainment; Formats: CD, digital download, streaming	5	KOR: 66,751
Sneakers	Released: June 7, 2021; Label: Star Crew Entertainment; Formats: CD, digital download, streaming	6	KOR: 62,962
Electrified: Urban Nostalgia	Released: November 19, 2021; Label: Star Crew Entertainment; Formats: CD, digital download, streaming	13	KOR: 24,736
You	Released: February 9, 2022; Label: Stone Music Entertainment, Genie Music; Formats: CD, digital download, streaming	3	KOR: 20,042
Strange World	Released: August 24, 2022; Label: BPM Entertainment, Kakao Entertainment; Formats: CD, digital download, streaming	5	KOR: 70,797
Blessed	Released: July 17, 2024; Label: BPM Entertainment, Kakao Entertainment; Formats: CD, digital download, streaming	15	KOR: 41,748

=== Reissues ===
Title	Details	Peak chart positions	Sales
Title	Details	KOR	Sales
Select Shop	Released: August 9, 2021; Label: Star Crew Entertainment; Formats: CD, digital download, streaming	6	KOR: 31,395

=== Singles ===
Title	Year	Peak chart positions		Album
Title	Year	KOR		Album
Title	Year	Circle	Hot	Album
"Don't Forget" (잊지마요) (featuring Park Ji-hoon)	2019	34	38	My Moment
"Bird"	2019	53	22	My Moment
"Riding" (라이딩) (featuring Gaeko)	2019	113	—	BXXX
"Blue"	2019	42	17	BXXX
"The Story of December" (다시 찾아온 12월 이야기)	2019	161	—	Non-album single
"Get Ready"	2020	35	91	Twilight Zone
"Forbidden Island" (그 섬)	2020	30	—	Mirage
"Sneakers" (스니커즈)	2021	20	90	Sneakers
"Strawberry Gum" (featuring Don Mills)	2021	97	—	Select Shop
"Electrified"	2021	— (Note: "Electrified" did not enter the Gaon Digital Chart, but peaked at number 22 on the Gaon Download Chart.)	—	Electrified: Urban Nostalgia
"Can't Live Without You"	2022	— (Note: "Can't Live Without You" did not enter the Gaon Digital Chart, but peaked at number 23 on the Gaon Download Chart.)	—	You
"La La Pop!" (Note: "La La Pop!" was released as a promotional single in collaboration with Universe.)	2022	— (Note: "La La Pop!" did not enter the Gaon Digital Chart, but peaked at number 24 on the Gaon Download Chart.)	—	Non-album single
"Focus"	2022	70	—	Strange World
"Blessed"	2024	— (Note: "Blessed" did not enter the Circle Digital Chart, but peaked at number 36 on the component Download Chart.)	—	Blessed
"Tell The World"	2026	— (Note: "Tell The World" did not enter the Circle Digital Chart, but peaked at number 43 on the component Download Chart.)	—	Non-album single
"—" denotes releases that did not chart or were not released in that region.

=== Other charted songs ===
Title	Year	Peak chart positions	Album
Title	Year	KOR Gaon	Album
"Tell Me I Love You" (오.꼭.말)	2019	141	My Moment
"Remember You" (문득)	2019	152	My Moment
"Lonely Night"	2019	188	My Moment

=== Soundtrack appearances ===
Title	Year	Peak chart positions	Album
Title	Year	KOR	Album
"Think of You" (띵크 오브 유)	2019	—	Her Private Life OST
"Immunity" (면역력)	2019	—	The Wind Blows OST
"Because of You" (나란 사람)	2019	—	Flower Crew: Joseon Marriage Agency OST
"I Fall in Love"	2020	—	The King: Eternal Monarch OST
"Serendipity" (우연일까)	2020	—	More Than Friends OST
"Fall in You"	2021	—	True Beauty OST
"Who You Are" (너라는 꿈)	2022	—	Moonshine OST
"With You" (with Jimin)	2022	15	Our Blues OST
"Gift" (선물)	2024	135	Lovely Runner OST
"What Are We"	2024	—	Love Next Door OST
"Us in Those Days" (그때의 우리)	2024	—	Family by Choice OST

=== Other releases and collaborations ===
Title	Details	Year
"Dream of a Dream"	Fever Music – the Fever Festival special release; Formats: Digital download, streaming	October 4, 2019
"Gathering My Tears" (내 눈물 모아)	Featuring Heize; Remake of Seo Ji Won – "Gathering My Tears"	November 17, 2019

== Filmography ==
=== Music videos ===
Title	Year	Director(s)	Ref.
"Bird"	2019	Jimmy (VIA)	
"Blue"	2019	Jimmy (VIA)	
"Get Ready"	2020	Korlio (August Frogs)	
"Forbidden Island"	2020	Lee Jun-woo (Salt Film)	
"Sneakers"	2021	Kwon Yong-soo (Studio Saccharin)	
"Strawberry Gum" (featuring Don Mills)	2021	Kwon Yong-soo (Studio Saccharin)	
"Electrified"	2021	Hong Won-ki, HYEYA (Zanybros)	
"Can't Live Without You"	2022	April Shower Film	
"La La Pop!"	2022	Lee Kyung-tae (Highqualityfish)	
"Focus"	2022	Choi Young-ji (Pinklabel Visual)	

=== Television and Radio shows ===
Year	Title	Role	Notes	Ref.
2017	Produce 101 Season 2	Contestant	Finished at 11th place	
2018	King of Masked Singer	Contestant	Won 1st and 2nd round; eliminated at the 3rd round	
2018	Law of the Jungle Sabah	Main Cast	Ep. 325–329	
2019	Idol Radio	DJ	Ep. 198	
2019	New Life for Children	MC		
2019	Linking Hearts through the Voices of Idol Stars	Reciter		
2019	Bistro the noble	Main Cast	Pilot episodes	
2019	Radio Star	Special MC		
2019	We Play	Main Cast	Season 1; 12 episodes	
2019	Midnight Idol	Host		
2020	Two Yoo Project Sugar Man	Special MC	Ep. 6, 100 Light Bulbs Special	
2020	We Play Season 2	Main Cast	Broadcast Date July 2020; 12 episodes	
2021	Follow Me	Main Host		
2021	Idol Radio (season 2)	DJ	Temporary DJ from episode 35-present; with Jeong Se-woon	
2024	Project 7	Director		
2025	The Gentlemen's League 4	Cast member		

== Musicals ==
Year	English title	Korean title	Role	Ref.
2022	Midnight Sun	태양의 노래	Jung Ha-ram	

== Songwriting and composing ==
Year	Publishing date	Song	Album	Artist	Lyricist	Composer
2018	19 November	불꽃놀이 (Flowerbomb)	1¹¹=1 (Power of Destiny)	Wanna One	✓	✓
2019	28 January	잊지마요 (Don't Forget) (feat. Park Ji-hoon)	My Moment	Ha Sung-woon	✓	✓
2019	28 February	Bird	My Moment	Ha Sung-woon	✓	✓
2019	28 February	오꼭말 (Tell me I love you)	My Moment	Ha Sung-woon	✓	✓
2019	28 February	문득 (Remember you)	My Moment	Ha Sung-woon	✓	✓
2019	28 February	Lonely Night	My Moment	Ha Sung-woon	✓	✓
2019	8 July	블루메이즈 (Bluemaze)	BXXX	Ha Sung-woon	✓	✓
2019	8 July	BLUE	BXXX	Ha Sung-woon	✓	-
2019	5 June	라이딩 (Riding) (feat. Gaeko)	BXXX	Ha Sung-woon	✓	✓
2019	8 July	저기요 (Excuse me)	BXXX	Ha Sung-woon	✓	✓
2019	8 July	오늘 뭐해? (What are you doing today?)	BXXX	Ha Sung-woon	✓	✓
2019	25 December	다시 찾아온 12월 이야기 (The Story of December)	Winter Single	Ha Sung-woon	✓	✓
2020	8 June	Lazy Lovers	Twilight Zone	Ha Sung-woon	✓	-
2020	8 June	Get Ready	Twilight Zone	Ha Sung-woon	-	-
2020	8 June	Puzzle	Twilight Zone	Ha Sung-woon	-	-
2020	8 June	Lie	Twilight Zone	Ha Sung-woon	-	-
2020	8 June	궁금's (Curiou's)	Twilight Zone	Ha Sung-woon	✓	✓
2020	8 June	Twinkle Twinkle	Twilight Zone	Ha Sung-woon	✓	-
2020	9 November	그 섬 (Forbidden Island)	Mirage	Ha Sung-woon	-	-
2020	9 November	촛불 (Candle Light)	Mirage	Ha Sung-woon	✓	-
2020	9 November	2000 Miles	Mirage	Ha Sung-woon	✓	-
2020	9 November	행성 (Without You)	Mirage	Ha Sung-woon	✓	✓
2020	9 November	말해줘요 (Talk To Me)	Mirage	Ha Sung-woon	✓	✓
2021	7 June	On & On	Sneakers	Ha Sung-woon	✓	✓
2021	7 June	Sneakers	Sneakers	Ha Sung-woon	-	-
2021	7 June	영화 한 편 볼까 하는데 (Why don't you see a movie?)	Sneakers	Ha Sung-woon	✓	✓
2021	7 June	Eeny Meeny Miny Moe	Sneakers	Ha Sung-woon	-	-
2021	7 June	겨우살이 (Don't leave me alone)	Sneakers	Ha Sung-woon	✓	✓
2021	7 June	Bus	Sneakers	Ha Sung-woon	✓	✓
2021	7 June	야광별 (Starlight)	Sneakers	Ha Sung-woon	✓	✓
2021	9 August	Cake	Select Shop	Ha Sung-woon	-	-
2021	9 August	Strawberry Gum (Feat. Don Mills)	Select Shop	Ha Sung-woon	-	-
2021	9 August	Let's Sing	Select Shop	Ha Sung-woon	-	-
2021	9 August	Galaxy Dust	Select Shop	Ha Sung-woon	-	-
2021	9 August	Magic Word	Select Shop	Ha Sung-woon	-	-
2021	9 August	Sneakers	Select Shop	Ha Sung-woon	-	-
2021	9 August	On & On	Select Shop	Ha Sung-woon	✓	✓
2021	9 August	영화 한 편 볼까 하는데 (Why don't you see a movie?)	Select Shop	Ha Sung-woon	✓	✓
2021	9 August	Eeny Meeny Miny Moe	Select Shop	Ha Sung-woon	-	-
2021	9 August	겨우살이 (Don't leave me alone)	Select Shop	Ha Sung-woon	✓	✓
2021	9 August	Bus	Select Shop	Ha Sung-woon	✓	✓
2021	9 August	야광별 (Starlight)	Select Shop	Ha Sung-woon	✓	✓
2021	19 November	Back to You	Electrified	Ha Sung-woon	-	-
2021	19 November	Electrified	Electrified	Ha Sung-woon	-	-
2021	19 November	Fairy Tale	Electrified	Ha Sung-woon	-	-
2021	19 November	Love Sound (ft. Rauas)	Electrified	Ha Sung-woon	-	-

== Awards and nominations ==
Name of the award ceremony, year presented, award category, work nominated, and the result of the nomination
Award	Year	Category	Nominee(s)/work	Result	Ref.
APAN Star Awards	2022	Best Original Soundtrack	"With You" (with Jimin)	Nominated	
Asia Artist Awards	2019	StarNews Popularity Award	Ha Sung-woon	Nominated	
Asia Artist Awards	2021	Male Solo Singer Popularity Award	Ha Sung-woon	Nominated	
Asia Model Awards (Note: Asia Model Awards is an annual ceremony that recognizes Asia's top models and celebrities.)	2022	Popularity Award – Singer	Ha Sung-woon	Won	
Brand Customer Loyalty Award	2021	Live Streaming Show DJ	Ha Sung-woon	Won	
Korea First Brand Awards	2020	Male Solo Artist	Ha Sung-woon	Won	
Korea First Brand Awards	2020	Male Idol Variety Star	Ha Sung-woon	Won	
Melon Music Awards	2019	Hot Trend Award	Ha Sung-woon	Nominated	
Melon Music Awards	2022	Netizen Popularity Award	Ha Sung-woon	Nominated	
Seoul Music Awards	2020	Main prize (Bonsang)	"Don't Forget" (잊지마요) (featuring Park Ji-hoon)	Nominated	
Seoul Music Awards	2020	Popularity Award	"Don't Forget" (잊지마요) (featuring Park Ji-hoon)	Nominated	
Seoul Music Awards	2020	K-Wave Award	"Don't Forget" (잊지마요) (featuring Park Ji-hoon)	Nominated	
Seoul Music Awards	2020	Dance Award	"Blue"	Won	
Seoul Music Awards	2021	Bonsang Award	Twilight Zone	Nominated	
Seoul Music Awards	2021	K-Wave Popularity Award	Twilight Zone	Nominated	
Seoul Music Awards	2021	Popularity Award	Twilight Zone	Nominated	
Seoul Music Awards	2021	Fan PD Artist Award	Ha Sung-woon	Nominated	
Soribada Best K-Music Awards	2019	Main Prize (Bonsang)	Ha Sung-woon	Won	
Soribada Best K-Music Awards	2020	Voice Award	Ha Sung-woon	Won	
