= Flower Crew: Joseon Marriage Agency =

2019 South Korean television series

- Promotional poster
- Hangul: 꽃파당: 조선혼담공작소
- Hanja: 꽃파堂: 朝鮮婚談工作所
- RR: Kkotpadang: Joseon hondam gongjakso
- MR: Kkotp'adang: Chosŏn hondam kongjakso
- Genre: Historical; Romantic comedy
- Written by: Kim Yi-rang
- Directed by: Kim Ga-ram
- Starring: Kim Min-jae; Gong Seung-yeon; Seo Ji-hoon; Park Ji-hoon; Byeon Woo-seok; Go Won-hee
- Country of origin: South Korea
- Original language: Korean
- No. of episodes: 16

Production
- Producers: Jeong Sung-taek; Park Hee-sul; Ju Bang-ok
- Production companies: Blossom Story; JP E&M

Original release
- Network: JTBC
- Release: September 16 – November 5, 2019

Flower Crew: Joseon Marriage Agency (Korean: 꽃파당: 조선혼담공작소) is a 2019 South Korean television series starring Kim Min-jae, Gong Seung-yeon, Seo Ji-hoon, Park Ji-hoon, Byeon Woo-seok, and Go Won-hee. It is based on the 2014 novel of the same name by Kim Yi-rang who also wrote the series. It aired on JTBC every Monday and Tuesday at 21:30 (KST) from September 16 to November 5, 2019.

== Synopsis ==
Ma Hoon, Young-soo, and Do Joon are Joseon's most successful marriage agency, the Flower Crew, and their 90 percent success rate has given them local fame despite the fact that, unusually, they are all men. Young-soo has impeccable taste in clothes and other wedding accoutrements and Do Joon is an information broker who learns every rumor, but the biggest contributor to their success is Ma Hoon's skills of observation and thorough research into prospective spouses.

A young blacksmith named Soo asks them to send a formal marriage proposal to Gae-ttong, the resourceful street girl who has won his heart. Even though their station as commoners means they don't need a formal intermediary, Soo insists because he loves and respects Gae-ttong so much. Gae-ttong is more interested in finding her missing brother, from whom she was separated when they were children, but she agrees to marry Soo because she and Soo have always supported and been kind to one another.

Unbeknownst to Soo, he is really a younger son of the now-dying King of Joseon, sent away so he could have a normal life. When the crown prince is assassinated, one of the king's councilors has Soo kidnapped and brought to the palace on what would have been his and Gae-ttong's wedding day. This makes it look like Soo abandoned his bride, leaving the Flower Crew with the wedding bills to pay and a damaged reputation. The Flower Crew gives Gae-ttong a job as their sole female employee, and she works with them to repair their business while Soo finds his way as king, and various parties investigate the crown prince's death.

The season covers several plotlines:

- Soo adjusting to his new role as a king and his wish to reunite with Gae-ttong.
- Growing romance between Ma Hoon and Gae-ttong.
- Gae-ttong learning manners and refinement so that she can blend in with the high-ranking yangban women.
- The mystery behind the assassination of the crown prince.
- Gae-ttong's search for her brother, from whom she was separated when they attempted to escape slavery years earlier.
- Ma Hoon and Do Joon's relationships with their estranged fathers.
- The plots of two of Soo's councilors and their factions.
- Young-soo's secret past as a baekjeong and criminal.

== Cast ==
=== Main ===
- Kim Min-jae as Ma Hoon
  - Choi Seung-hoon as young Ma Hoon

The silent and cold founder of Flower Crew. Known as the most intelligent and handsome man in Hanyang, he is also the leader and the best matchmaker of the crew.

- Gong Seung-yeon as Gae-ttong / Yoon Soo-yun
  - Lee Go-eun as young Gae-ttong

Lee Soo's first love. She has a stubborn personality and does many jobs to survive and to find her long-lost brother, from whom she was separated when they attempted to escape enslavement as children. She eventually joins Flower Crew to repay her marriage debt. She must keep her history as a runaway a secret.

- Seo Ji-hoon as Lee Soo
  - Cha Sung-je as young Lee Soo

A 23-year-old humble blacksmith who is in love with Gae-ttong. He gets captured on his wedding day and learns that he is to be the new king of Joseon.

- Park Ji-hoon as Go Young-soo / Chil-nom

A fashionable young man whose skills with clothes and makeup make him an asset to the Flower Crew, as he can turn any bride into a beauty. His fashion choices quickly become trends. He changed his name to escape his past as a baekjeong accused of a terrible crime.

- Byeon Woo-seok as Do Joon
  - Lee Seung-woo as young Do Joon

The Flower Crew's informant. Due to his handsome looks, many girls in Hanyang adore him and he uses this advantage to collect information in and around Hanyang. He eventually falls for Kang Ji-hwa.

- Go Won-hee as Kang Ji-hwa

The vain daughter of Second Chief State Councillor who is very cold and overbearing, especially towards commoners and slaves.

=== Supporting ===
==== People around Ma Hoon ====
- Park Ho-san as Ma Bong-deok

Ma Hoon's father, also, the Chief State Councillor

- Jung Yoon-seok as Ma Joon

==== People around Gae-ttong ====
- Jang Yoo-sang as Kang
  - Park Sang-hoon as young Kang

Gae-ttong's long-lost brother

==== People around Lee Soo ====
- Lee Yoon-gun as Kim Moon-seok
- Ha Hoe-jung as Eunuch Jang
- Ahn Da-bi as Se-ah

==== People around Do Joon ====
- Kim Hye-ji as Seom Seom

A girl from a courtesan house that frequently helps Do Joon to collect information.

- Jung Ji-yoon as Do-joon's mother

==== People around Kang Ji-hwa ====
- Jung Jae-sung as Kang Mong-gu

Kang Ji-hwa's father, also, the Second Chief State Councillor

- Park Bo-mi as Chun-sim

One of Ji-hwa's slaves who always appears with her. She also has a crush on Kang, another slave of Ji-hwa's.

==== Others ====
- Kwon So-hyun as Queen Dowager Yoon
- Jung Eui-jae as Hyun
- Lee Chae-won as Ma Jeong-hwa
- Choi Yi-seon as Tae-soo

Flower Crew servant

=== Special appearances ===
- Jo Sung-ha as King (Ep. 1–2)
- Go Soo as Crown Prince (Ep. 1)
- Woo Hyun as doctor (Ep. 1)
- Ahn Se-ha as peddler (Ep. 1)
- Jang Su-won as Jang In-sung (Ep. 1)
- Park Soo-ah as Lee Eun-young (Ep. 1)
- Lee Su-ji as young lady (Ep. 1)
- Jo Ryun as inn owner (Ep. 2)
- Choi Jin-hyuk as the Second Chief State Councillor's niece's matched guy (Ep. 5)
- Daniel Lindemann as a German customer (Ep. 16)

== Production ==
The first script reading took place in April 2019 at JTBC Building in Sangam-dong, Seoul, South Korea. Filming was wrapped up on October 10, 2019.

== Original soundtrack ==
Flower Crew: Joseon Marriage Agency OST

Soundtrack album by Various artists
- Released: 2019
- Genre: Soundtrack
- Languages: Korean; English
- Label: AMP LIVE

=== Part 1 ===
Released on September 16, 2019
| No. | Title | Lyrics | Music | Artist | Length |
|---|---|---|---|---|---|
| 1. | "PIN GURURU" (핑그르르) | Kim Jong-chun; Lim Ji-soo | Kim Jong-chun | Lee Woo | 3:36 |
| 2. | "PIN GURURU" (핑그르르; Inst.) | | Kim Jong-chun | | 3:36 |
| Total length: | | | | | 7:12 |

=== Part 2 ===
Released on September 24, 2019
| No. | Title | Lyrics | Music | Artist | Length |
|---|---|---|---|---|---|
| 1. | "It Was You" (그대였습니다) | yoda | Kim Se-jin | Jeong Se-woon | 4:11 |
| 2. | "It Was You" (그대였습니다; Inst.) | | Kim Se-jin | | 4:11 |
| Total length: | | | | | 8:22 |

=== Part 3 ===
Released on October 1, 2019
| No. | Title | Lyrics | Music | Artist | Length |
|---|---|---|---|---|---|
| 1. | "Solar Eclipse" (개기일식) | Ahn Se-young; Son Yi-sak | Ahn Se-young; Son Yi-sak; Lee Gun-bin | Son Seung-yeon | 3:20 |
| 2. | "Solar Eclipse" (개기일식; Inst.) | | Ahn Se-young; Son Yi-sak; Lee Gun-bin | | 3:20 |
| Total length: | | | | | 6:40 |

=== Part 4 ===
Released on October 8, 2019
| No. | Title | Lyrics | Music | Artist | Length |
|---|---|---|---|---|---|
| 1. | "With You" | Choi Jae-woo; yoda | Ahn Sung-il; Kim Se-jin | MAKTUB, Raon | 3:23 |
| 2. | "With You" (Inst.) | | Ahn Sung-il; Kim Se-jin | | 3:23 |
| Total length: | | | | | 6:46 |

=== Part 5 ===
Released on October 15, 2019
| No. | Title | Lyrics | Music | Artist | Length |
|---|---|---|---|---|---|
| 1. | "Because Of You" (나란 사람) | Ahn Sung-il; AHIN | Ahn Sung-il | Ha Sung-woon | 4:01 |
| 2. | "Because Of You" (나란 사람; Inst.) | | Ahn Sung-il | | 4:01 |
| Total length: | | | | | 8:02 |

=== Part 6 ===
Released on October 22, 2019
| No. | Title | Lyrics | Music | Artist | Length |
|---|---|---|---|---|---|
| 1. | "Eyes On You" (눈이 기억하는 사람) | Ahn Sung-il; AHIN | Ahn Sung-il; Min Sung-jin | Han Ki-joo | 4:05 |
| 2. | "Eyes On You" (눈이 기억하는 사람; Inst.) | | Ahn Sung-il; Min Sung-jin | | 4:05 |
| Total length: | | | | | 8:10 |

=== Part 7 ===
Released on October 29, 2019
| No. | Title | Lyrics | Music | Artist | Length |
|---|---|---|---|---|---|
| 1. | "Branded In My Heart" (마음에 그리다) | Ahn Sung-il; Lee Ha-jin | Ahn Sung-il; Andreas Öberg; Maja Keuc; Simon Petrén; Kim Won | Yesung | 4:31 |
| 2. | "Branded In My Heart" (마음에 그리다; Inst.) | | Ahn Sung-il; Andreas Öberg; Maja Keuc; Simon Petrén; Kim Won | | 4:31 |
| Total length: | | | | | 9:02 |

=== Part 8 ===
Released on November 5, 2019
| No. | Title | Lyrics | Music | Artist | Length |
|---|---|---|---|---|---|
| 1. | "First" (어디에서 왔을까) | DUNK | Ahn Sung-il; DUNK | DUNK | 4:23 |
| 2. | "First" (어디에서 왔을까; Inst.) | | Ahn Sung-il; DUNK | | 4:23 |
| Total length: | | | | | 8:46 |

== Viewership ==
Flower Crew: Joseon Marriage Agency : South Korea viewers per episode (thousands)

| Season | Episode number | | | | | | | | | | | | | | | | Average |
| Season | 1 | 2 | 3 | 4 | 5 | 6 | 7 | 8 | 9 | 10 | 11 | 12 | 13 | 14 | 15 | 16 | Average |
|---|---|---|---|---|---|---|---|---|---|---|---|---|---|---|---|---|---|
| 1 | 968 | 784 | 816 | 693 | 632 | 624 | 657 | 611 | 644 | 699 | 552 | 582 | 635 | 722 | 655 | 703 | 686 |

Source: Audience measurement performed nationwide by Nielsen Media Research.

Average TV viewership ratings
| Ep. | Original broadcast date | Title (Note: Each episode title is paired with a flower or plant that serves as the theme for the episode.) | Average audience share (AGB Nielsen) | |
| Ep. | Original broadcast date | Title | Nationwide | Seoul |
|---|---|---|---|---|
| 1 | September 16, 2019 | A Divine Match: Plantain Lily (하늘이 내린 인연: 비비추) (Note: 비비추 (RR: bibichu): Hosta longipes (Purple-bracted plantain lily)) | 4.278% | 4.983% |
| 2 | September 17, 2019 | Shyness: Hydrangea (수줍음: 수국) (Note: 수국 (suguk): Hydrangea macrophylla) | 3.752% | 4.145% |
| 3 | September 23, 2019 | Longing: Zinnia (그리움: 백일홍) (Note: 백일홍 (baegilhong): Zinnia elegans (Common zinnia)) | 3.356% | 3.401% |
| 4 | September 24, 2019 | Shyness: Peony (수줍음: 작약) (Note: 작약 (jagyak): Peony (genus Paeonia)) | 3.496% | 3.997% |
| 5 | September 30, 2019 | A Secret Love: Wind Flower (비밀스런 사랑: 나도바람꽃) (Note: 나도바람꽃 (nadobaramkkot): Enemion raddeanum (East Asian false rue anemone), a species of flower of the family Ranunculaceae, related to the common windflowers (Anemone)) | 3.056% | 3.299% |
| 6 | October 1, 2019 | A Fluttering Heart: Silk Tree (두근거리는 마음: 자귀나무) (Note: 자귀나무 (jagwinamu): Albizia julibrissin (Silk tree)) | 3.017% | 3.325% |
| 7 | October 7, 2019 | A Second Chance: Peppermint Flower (두 번째 기회: 박하꽃) (Note: 박하꽃 (bakhakkot), or simply 박하 (bakha): Mentha arvensis var. piperascens (East Asian wild mint)) | 3.297% | 3.431% |
| 8 | October 8, 2019 | Unachievable Love: Resurrection Lily (이루어질 수 없는 사랑: 상사화) (Note: 상사화 (sangsahwa): Lycoris squamigera (Resurrection lily / Surprise lily)) | 2.984% | 3.185% |
| 9 | October 14, 2019 | A Love Kept Hidden in My Heart: Marguerite (마음속에 감춘 사랑: 나무쑥갓) (Note: 나무쑥갓 (namussukgat): Marguerite daisy) | 3.107% | 3.195% |
| 10 | October 15, 2019 | Pitiful Love: Marigold (가엾은 사랑: 홍황초) (Note: 홍황초 (honghwangcho): Tagetes patula (French marigold)) | 3.167% | 3.305% |
| 11 | October 21, 2019 | Lies: Morning Glory (거짓말: 애기나팔꽃) (Note: 애기나팔꽃 (aeginapalkkot): Ipomoea lacunosa (White morning glory)) | 2.735% | 2.877% |
| 12 | October 22, 2019 | I'm Worried About Your Love: Aster (당신의 사랑이 걱정입니다: 과꽃) (Note: 과꽃 (gwakkot): Callistephus chinensis (China aster)) | 2.899% | 2.757% |
| 13 | October 28, 2019 | Hope: Bellflower (소망: 도라지) (Note: 도라지 (doraji): Platycodon grandiflorus (Chinese bellflower/balloon flower)) | 2.932% | 3.396% |
| 14 | October 29, 2019 | The Return: Shiny Mint (회황: 꽃향유) (Note: 꽃향유 (kkothyangyu): Elsholtzia splendens (Shiny mint)) | 3.348% | 3.330% |
| 15 | November 4, 2019 | Don't Touch Me: Wolfsbane (나를 건드리지 마세요: 투구꽃) (Note: 투구꽃 (tugukkot): Aconitum jaluense (Wolfsbane / monkshood)) | 3.199% | 3.361% |
| 16 | November 5, 2019 | Blossom for Eternity and Never Wither: Rose of Sharon (영원히 피고또 피어서 지지않기를: 무궁화) (Note: 무궁화 (mugunghwa): Hibiscus syriacus (Rose of sharon / Korean rose)) | 3.828% | 4.385% |
| Average | | | 3.278% | 3.523% |
In the table above, the blue numbers represent the lowest ratings and the red numbers represent the highest ratings.; This drama aired on a cable channel/pay TV which normally has a relatively smaller audience compared to free-to-air TV/public broadcasters (KBS, SBS, MBC and EBS).
