= Summer Vacation (2026 TV series) =

2026 South Korean television series

- Promotional poster
- Hangul: 여름방학
- RR: Yeoreum banghak
- MR: Yŏrŭm panghak
- Written by: Song Ji-won
- Directed by: Han Ga-ram
- Starring: Jinyoung; Cho Yi-hyun; Hong Ye-ji
- Country of origin: South Korea
- Original language: Korean
- No. of episodes: 8

Production
- Production company: By4M Studio

Original release
- Network: Lifetime
- Release: October 26, 2026 – present

Summer Vacation (Korean: 여름방학) is an ongoing South Korean teen romance television series written by Song Ji-won, directed by Han Ga-ram, and starring Jung Jin-young and Cho Yi-hyun. It premiered on Lifetime on October 26, 2026, and airs every Monday and Tuesday at 22:50 (KST). It is also available for streaming on Wavve.

== Premise ==
Kim Ha-yeon, an ordinary 18-year-old high school student, travels to the unfamiliar rural village of Upo-ri during summer vacation, where she meets Jo Yu-gyeom, the eldest son and heir of a traditional Korean family. Their encounter leads to a series of mysterious events.

== Cast ==
- Jung Jin-young as Jo Yu-gyeom, the eldest son of a landowner in Upo Village.
- Cho Yi-hyun as Kim Ha-yeon, a high school student who goes down to Upo Village during summer vacation.
- Hong Ye-ji as Seong Sae-ryeong, Yu-gyeom's girlfriend
- Ryu Hae-jun as Kim Jung-yeon

== Production ==
=== Development ===
The series is written by Song Ji-won, directed by Han Ga-ram, and planned and produced by By4M Studio.

=== Casting ===
Cho Yi-hyun and Jung Jin-young were confirmed to lead the series in July 2022. Two months later, Ryu Hae-jun joined the cast. In April 2023, Hong Ye-ji was confirmed to appear.

=== Filming ===
Principal photography began in July 2022.

== Release ==
Summer Vacation is scheduled to premiere on Wavve and Lifetime on October 26, 2026 at 22:50 (KST).
