= 2037 (film) =

2022 South Korean film

- Promotional poster
- Hangul: 이공삼칠
- Lit.: Two Zero Three Seven
- RR: Igongsamchil
- MR: Igongsamch'il
- Directed by: Mo Hong-jin
- Written by: Mo Hong-jin; Yoo Da-young
- Starring: Hong Ye-ji; Kim Ji-young; Kim Mi-hwa; Hwang Seok-jeong; Shin Eun-jung; Jeon So-min; Yoon Mi-kyung; Jung In-ki
- Cinematography: Choe Sang-ho
- Edited by: Lee Do-hyeon
- Production companies: Motive Pictures; Jackfilm
- Distributed by: Cinepirun; Film 6
- Release date: June 8, 2022
- Running time: 126 minutes
- Country: South Korea
- Language: Korean

2037 (Korean: 이공삼칠) is a 2022 South Korean drama film directed by Mo Hong-jin. The drama takes place among female inmates, depicting the story of adults who want to give hope to the hard-to-believe reality that happened to a 19-year-old girl. It was released on June 8, 2022.

== Synopsis ==
The 19-year-old protagtonist Yoon-young, who dreams of becoming a civil servant, lives with her single deaf mother and works part-time in a café. She gets assaulted and raped by her mother's co-worker one fateful night, who she kills immediately after the incident when he threatens to take advantage of her mom too. She is imprisoned after that and is only referred to as prisoner number 2037 instead of her own name. In this desperate situation, she learns she is pregnant. Depressed by the news, she stops meeting her mother and bonds with her fellow prison mates in cell room 12, each with their own story, who support and protect Yoon-young.

== Cast ==
=== Main ===
- Hong Ye-ji as Jung Yoon-young, a 19-year-old girl who is imprisoned for committing a murder
- Kim Ji-young as Kyung-sook, Yoon-young's deaf mother
- Kim Mi-hwa as Soon Je, the senior of Cell 12
- Hwang Seok-jeong as Li-ra, a prison hacker
- Shin Eun-jung as Hae-soo, prisoner who loves reading and values principles
- Jeon So-min as Jang-mi, the last adultery inmate before the abolition of adultery
- Yoon Mi-kyung, as Sa-rang, an angry troublemaker who appears as a prisoner in Cell 12 to give Yoon-young hope in life once again
- Jung In-ki as a prison warden

=== Supporting ===
- Kim Do-yeon as Kim, a prison guard
- Seo Jin-won as a judge
- Hong Seo-joon
- Jung In-gi
- Jung daeun

== Production ==
Principal photography began on May 25, 2021, in Paju, Gyeonggi Province.
