= Elsholtzia penduliflora =

Scientific classification
- Kingdom: Plantae
- Clade: Tracheophytes
- Clade: Angiosperms
- Clade: Eudicots
- Clade: Asterids
- Order: Lamiales
- Family: Lamiaceae
- Genus: Elsholtzia
- Species: E. penduliflora

Binomial name
- Elsholtzia penduliflora W.W.Sm.

Synonyms
- Aphanochilus penduliflorus (W.W.Sm.) Kudô

Species of flowering plant

Elsholtzia penduliflora (Vietnamese: chùa dù) is a species of flowering plant in the family Lamiaceae. It is native to Vietnam, and Yunnan in China, and has been introduced to Thailand. In Vietnam, E. penduliflora is claimed to be a medicinal herb good for colds and fevers. Essential oil from E. penduliflora can be used as a substitute for eucalyptus oil.
