= Johann Sigismund Elsholtz =

German naturalist and physician (1623–1688)

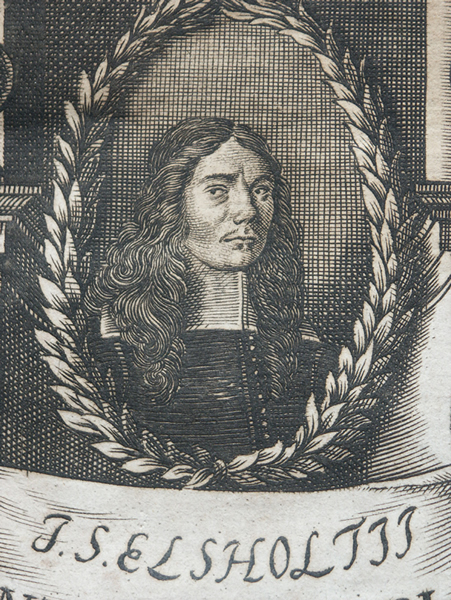
Johann Sigismund Elßholtz

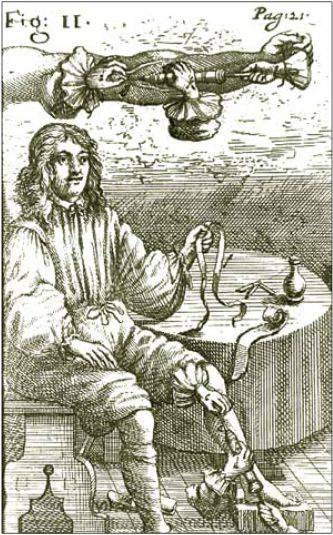
Clysmatica nova, 1667

Johann Sigismund Elsholtz (26 August 1623 – 28 February 1688) (some sources mention his day of birth as 28 August, and his death on 19 February) was a German naturalist who was a native of Frankfurt an der Oder.

== Biography ==
Johann Sigismund Elsholtz studied at the Universities of Wittenberg, Königsberg and Padua, where he received his doctorate in 1653. He was appointed court botanist, alchemist and physician to Elector Friedrich Wilhelm of Brandenburg (1620-1688), and in 1657 was put in charge of Friedrich Wilhelm's botanical gardens at Berlin, Potsdam and Oranienburg.

In 1654, he published Anthropometria, an early study of anthropometry. This book was written for the benefit of artists and astrologers, as well as for students of medicine and physiognomy. It examines the perceived relationship between proportions of the human body and the incidence of disease.

Elsholtz was a pioneer in the fields of hygiene and nutrition, and in his writings on holistic health, he stressed the importance of clean air and water, healthy food and drink, and also personal cleanliness.

In his 1665 work Clysmatica nova, he investigated the possibilities of intravenous injection. He performed early research of blood transfusions and "infusion therapy", and speculated that a husband with a "melancholic nature" could be re-vitalized by the blood of his "vibrant wife", thus leading to a harmonious marriage.

The botanical genus Elsholtzia is named in his honor. This plant genus includes the species Elsholtzia ciliata.

== Selected published works ==
  - Published in Latin:
- "Flora Marchica", 1663.
- "Anthropometria, sive de mutua membrorum corporis humani proportione et nævorum harmonia libellus", 1663.
- "Clysmatica nova sive ratio qua in venam rectam medicamenta immitti possint", 1667.
- "Aurum Aurae, Vi Magnetismi universalis attractum per Inventorem anagrammatizomenum", (with Christian Adolf Balduin), 1674.
- "De phosphoris quatuor observationes", 1676.
  - English translations:
- "The Curious Distillatory; Or the Art of Distilling Coloured Liquors, Spirits, Oyls, ...", translated into English by Thomas Shirley (1677).
- "Clysmatica Nova (1665): Elsholtz' Neglected Work on Intravenous Injection" (1933).
- "Clysmatica Nova", edited by John W. R. McIntyre; Iwanami Book Service Center, (1995).
