= Beautiful Audrey =

2024 film by Lee Young-kook

- Hangul: 세상 참 예쁜 오드리
- RR: Sesang cham yeppeun Odeuri
- MR: Sesang ch'am yeppŭn Odŭri
- Directed by: Lee Young-kook
- Written by: Lee Young-kook
- Produced by: Lee Seung-joon
- Starring: Kim Jung-nan; Park Ji-hoon; Kim Bo-young
- Cinematography: Kim Hoon-kwang
- Edited by: Seo Hyeon Woo; Jeon Won-seok
- Music by: Yoo Sang-hoon
- Production companies: BCM; ASCENDiO; K-Star Global Entertainment
- Distributed by: Content Zone
- Release date: 24 October 2024
- Running time: 100 minutes
- Country: South Korea
- Language: Korean
- Box office: $130,952

Beautiful Audrey (Korean: 세상 참 예쁜 오드리; lit. 'The World's Most Beautiful, Audrey') is a 2024 South Korean film written and directed by Lee Young-kook. It stars Kim Jung-nan, Park Ji-hoon and Kim Bo-young. The film centers on family, reconciliation, and the difficulties of overcoming misfortune.

== Synopsis ==
The film centers on Mi-yeon and Ki-hoon, a mother and son team that own and operate a noodle business. When Mi-yeon receives a terrible medical diagnosis, their lives are upended, and Ki-hoon is forced to get back in touch with his sister Ji-eun, who moved away to pursue a career as a singer.

== Cast ==
=== Main ===
- Park Ji-hoon as Kang Ki-hoon
- Kim Jung-nan as Oh Mi-yeon
- Kim Bo-young as Kang Ji-eun

=== Support ===
- Lee Pil-mo as Kang Jin-soo
- Jang Shin-young as a neurologist doctor
- Kim Ki-doo as Han Deok-soo
- Kim Yi-kyeong as Baek Jang-mi
- Ha Si-Eun as Lee Woo-kyeong
- Jeon Young-mi as Mrs. kim

== Release ==
The film released in South Korea on October 24, 2024. Beautiful Audrey had its world premiere at the 28th Bucheon International Fantastic Film Festival on July 4, 2024, prior to its official release date.

On May 2, 2025, the film is accessible on Viu Philippines as part of Mother's Month celebration.

== Reception ==
In South Korea, Audrey sold 10,297 tickets, earning a total of US$130,952.
