= My Moment (EP) =

EP by Ha Sung-woon
- Released: February 28, 2019
- Genre: K-pop
- Length: 17:44
- Label: Interpark
- Producer: Ha Sung-woon

Ha Sung-woon chronology
My Moment (2019)	BXXX (2019)

My Moment is the debut EP by South Korean singer Ha Sung-woon, released on February 28, 2019, by Interpark. It features five songs, which were co-composed and co-produced by Sungwoon, including the singles "Don't Forget" (featuring former Wanna One bandmate Park Ji-hoon) and "Bird". The album debuted at number one on the Gaon Album Chart, and sold nearly 60,000 copies in South Korea in its first day of release.

== Background ==
Sungwoon said that he wanted to "demonstrate the music [he] want[s] to pursue" with the EP and not be concerned about appealing to popular tastes, although he admitted that he was "curious" about how interested the public would be in his solo music.

== Track listing ==
No.	Title	Length
1.	"Don't Forget" (잊지마요) (featuring Park Ji-hoon)	3:40
2.	"Bird"	3:22
3.	"Tell Me I Love You" (오.꼭.말)	3:10
4.	"Remember You" (문득)	3:53
5.	"Lonely Night"	3:39
Total length:		17:44

Note

- While "Don't Forget" is the first track and considered part of the EP, it is not available as part of it on either iTunes or Korean services like Melon. Melon contains a note advising that the song can be purchased as a separate single.

== Charts ==
Chart (2019)	Peak position
South Korean Albums (Gaon)	1

== Sales ==
Region	Sales
South Korea (Gaon)	87,737
