= Park Ji-hoon =

South Korean singer and actor (born 1999)

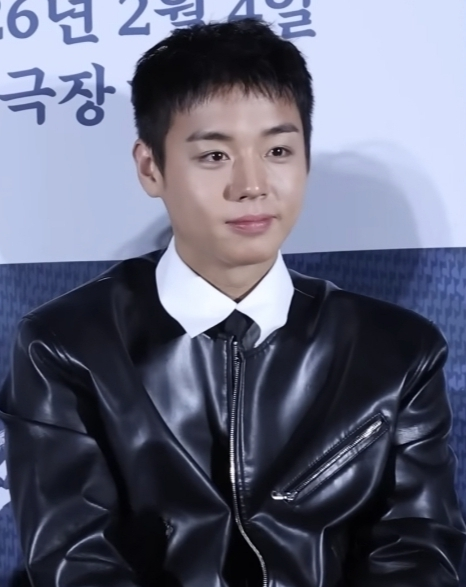
- Park in 2025
- Born: May 29, 1999 (age 27); Masan, South Korea
- Education: Chung-Ang University; School of Performing Arts Seoul – Broadcasting Arts
- Occupations: Singer; actor
- Years active: 2006–present
- Musical career
- Genres: K-pop; R&B; PBR&B; Alternative hip hop
- Instrument: Vocals
- Years active: 2017–present
- Labels: Maroo; YY
- Formerly of: Wanna One
- Website: yyentertain.com

Korean name
- Hangul: 박지훈
- RR: Bak Jihun
- MR: Pak Chihun

Signature
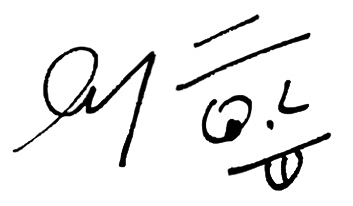

Park Ji-hoon (Korean: 박지훈; born May 29, 1999) is a South Korean singer and actor. He started his career in the entertainment industry as a commercial model and child actor in 2006. In 2017, he rose to fame by placing second in the second season of the reality competition series Produce 101 and becoming a member of the show's resulting boy group Wanna One (2017–2019, 2021–2022). As a solo recording artist, Park has released the EP O'Clock with the lead single "L.O.V.E" in 2019, followed by his debut studio album Message in 2020. As an actor, he is known for his leading roles in the first and second seasons of television series Weak Hero (2022–2025) and the historical film The King's Warden (2026).

== Early life ==
Park Ji-hoon was born on May 29, 1999, in Masan Province in South Korea. Originally from Gyeongsang Province, Park has lived in Seoul since he was seven years old. He graduated from National Middle School of Traditional Arts, where he majored in musical theater. Park majored in broadcasting arts at School of Performing Arts Seoul and graduated in January 2018. Park was accepted into Chung-Ang University's Department of Theater for 2018.

== Career ==
=== 2006–present: Acting career ===
==== Early work ====
Park debuted as a child actor, participating in musicals like Peter Pan (2007–2010), The Harmonium in My Memory (2010), and Radio Star (2010–2011), and small stints in television dramas Jumong (2006–2007), The King and I (2007–2008), Kimchi Cheese Smile (2007–2008), Iljimae (2008), and more. Park also appeared in SS501's reality show SS501 SOS (2006), although his face was blurred out through the episodes. In 2007, he appeared in KM Idol War with Big Bang. During his childhood, he continued to be active in musical theatre, television broadcasts, and film, and also worked as an advertisement model. Park was less active in the entertainment industry in his teen years.

==== Return to acting and transition to lead roles ====
In April 2019 Park was cast in JTBC's historical drama Flower Crew: Joseon Marriage Agency, which was aired on September 16. He received praise for his acting skills and received positive reviews. He topped Good Data Corporation's buzzworthy list for eight consecutive weeks. Park took his first leading role in the Kakao M's web drama Love Revolution (2020), an adaptation of the webtoon of the same name. It from September 1 to December 27, 2020. Park received wider recognition through the series. He released the song "Midnight"as part of the drama's soundtrack. Park starred in the KBS college drama At a Distance, Spring is Green which aired from June 14 thru July 2021.

==== Weak Hero and The King's Warden ====
Park starred in the wavve k-drama Weak Hero which premiered on November 18. Before its premiere, the first three episodes of the drama were screened at the 27th Busan International Film Festival where it sold out in two minutes, leading to additional screenings. The drama was a hit becoming wavve's #1 drama in paid subscribers within the first day. Park received positive reviews from audience and critics as Park's cute and bubbly persona as an idol is different from his Weak Hero character. When asked about the casting of Park, filmmaker Han Jun-hee revealed that the production company was impressed with his performance in At a Distance, Spring Is Green (2021), and was suggested to director Yu Su-min. In 2024, he made his film debut with Beautiful Audrey alongside Kim Jung-nan.

The drama Love Song for Illusion was released in 2024, with Park portraying dual roles. On August 5, 2024, Park signed an exclusive contract with YY Entertainment for his future activities. Park starred as King Danjong, the central figure of the historical film The King's Warden directed by Jang Hang-jun. The film was released on February 4, 2026, coinciding with the Korean New Year holiday. It received positive reviews and is the highest-grossing film in South Korea box office history. Later in 2026, Park also played the lead role in the tvN drama The Legend of Kitchen Soldier which won Best Drama at the 5th Blue Dragon Series Awards. At the same award show, Park was nominated for Best Actor, making him the youngest Best Actor nominee in Blue Dragon Series Awards history.

=== 2017–present: Music career ===
==== Produce 101 and Wanna One ====
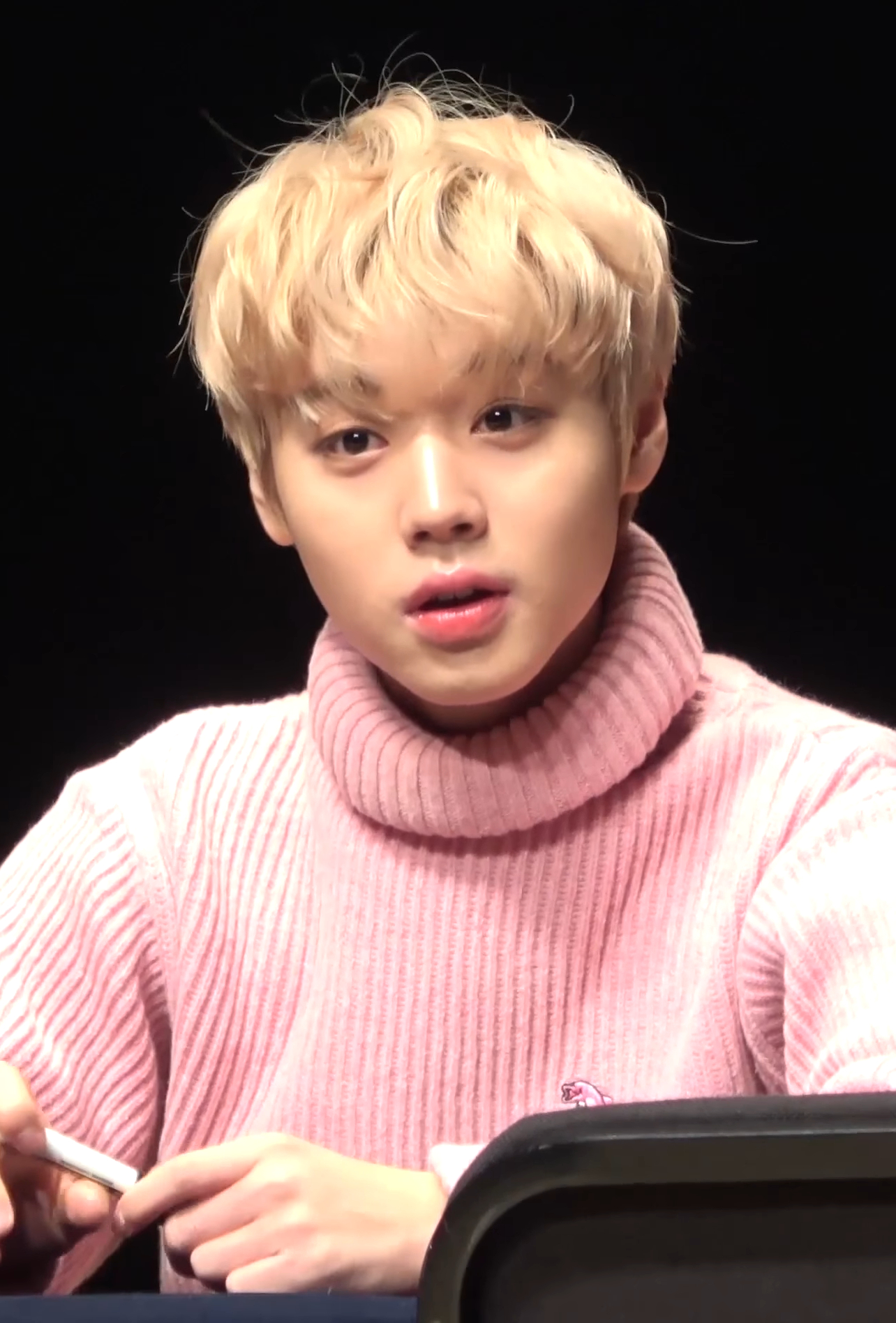
Park in 2017

Park began training to become an idol singer under SM Entertainment and Fantagio. Due to a knee injury, he did not make it to the final line up of Fantagio's boy group Astro and subsequently transferred to Maroo Entertainment.

In 2017, Park represented Maroo Entertainment in the second season of Produce 101. He experienced a sudden rise in popularity after going viral as "wink boy (윙크남)", after the introductory "It's Me (Pick Me)" stage on M Countdown, even before the show had started airing. Consequently, Park's participation in the survival show received extensive media attention to the extent that his self-made aegyo catchphrase "save you in my heart (내 마음 속에 저장)" trended on social media and was used by various companies for marketing purposes.

The phrase was later crowned as the best catchphrase of 2017 by KOCCA. Furthermore, Park received offers from various companies to become their advertisement model while the show was still being aired, and it was later revealed that Park had signed an exclusive contract with Maroo Entertainment before the show had started. He finished second, which made him a member of the project boy group Wanna One under YMC Entertainment. Wanna One disbanded on December 31, 2018, and officially completed activities after their sold out 4-day final concert series 'Therefore' that ran from January 24 to 27 at Gocheok Sky Dome.

==== Solo activities ====
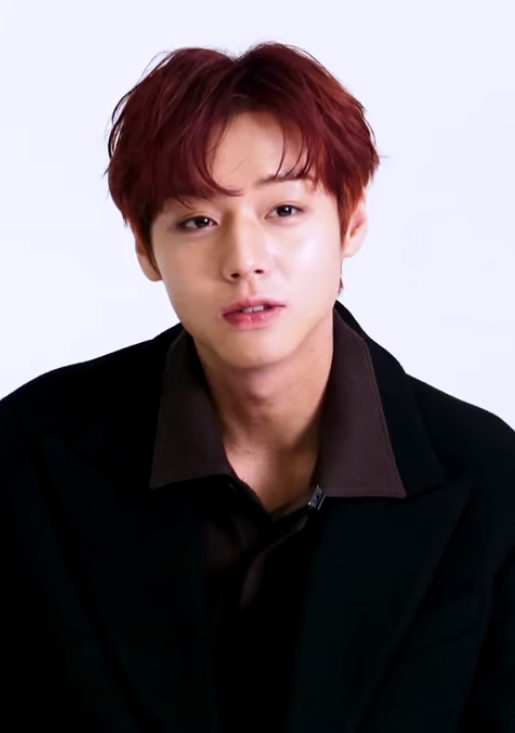
Park in 2022

On March 26, 2019 Park released his debut EP as a soloist, O'Clock, with the lead single "L.O.V.E". Park took his first solo music show win with his debut album "L.O.V.E" on KBS Music Bank on April 5, 2019. On December 4, Park released his second EP, 360, and its lead single of the same name. Park release his third EP, The W, with the title track "Wing" on May 26, 2020. He then released his first studio album, Message, with the title track "Gotcha". He had his first ever online solo concert titled "Message" on December 13.

On August 12, Park released his fourth EP My Collection, with the title track "Gallery". On October 28, Park released his fifth EP Hot&Cold, with the title track "Serious". In August 2022, it was announced that Park would be making a comeback with his sixth EP The Answer with the title track "Nitro" on October 12, 2022. On September 30, he pre-released a b-side called "Moon & Back". On October 9 and 10, Park held a two-day concert called '[CLUE]' at the YES24 Live Hall. Park released his seventh EP Blank or Black with the title track "Blank Effect" on April 12, 2023.

In 2026, following his success in The King's Warden, Park held a two-day fanmeeting called 'Same Place' at Yes24 Live Hall from April 24th and 25th. On April 29th, he released his first single album Re:Flect with the title track "Bodyelse". After the release of his album, Park embarked on an Asian Fancon [Re:Flect] from May through July with stops in Tokyo, Seoul, Kuala Lumpur, Ho Chi Minh, Hanoi, Bankok, and Singapore. Later in the year, Park also participated in Wanna One reunion activities such as Wanna One Go: Go Back to Base and Wanna One Go in LA which were released on Mnet Plus in April and September respectively. In August 2026, he performed "Energetic", "Boomerang", and "Spring Breeze, Again" with Wanna One during day 1 at KCON LA at Crypto.com Arena.

== Other ventures ==
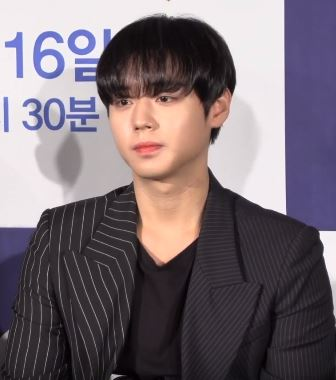
Park in 2019

In April 2018, Park was appointed as an endorser of April Skin's Milk Booster Fast Shampoo and hair-dyes. Park along with fellow Wanna One member Ong Seong-wu was selected as a model for CLAVIS and their line of sports bracelets on April 20. In March 2019, the seaweed snack brand Masita revealed Park as the new ambassador for their new "0% MSG" recipe that came in five different flavors. The same month, Park and fellow former Wanna One member Bae Jin-young were selected as the new advertising models for youth make-up brand, I'M MEME. In May, it was announced that Park had been selected as the new model for pizza specialty brand, Pizza E-Tang. The promotion was a success with the pizza consistently selling out. On May 3, Yuyu Nature selected Park as a model for their flagship health supplement, Formoline L112.

In June 2020, Park had his first apparel collaboration with contemporary fashion brand [LE] MOHO. The collection was named "[LA] POMME de Universe" in which Park participated in designing. In October, Park collaborated with Tous on its Toss Love Me perfume that was made to commemorate the 100th anniversary of the brand's founding. It became a bestseller and sold out at the Olive Young Myeong-dong Store where it was carried domestically. On August 18, 2021, it was announced that Park had been selected as a model for the Korean skincare and cosmetics brand It's Skin, running advertisements in Japan and Southeast Asia.

In 2026, Park was selected as a model for Baskin Robbins' summer campaign, the fragrance brand Forment, and Superdry's 26FW season campaign. Park's Superdry collaboration collection titled 'Raw Archive' was released on August 3rd and sold out online the same day.

== Discography ==
=== Studio albums ===
List of studio albums, with selected chart positions and sales
Title	Album details	Peak chart positions	Sales
Title	Album details	KOR	Sales
Message	Released: November 4, 2020; Label: Maroo Entertainment; Formats: CD, digital download, streaming; Track listing: 1. "Waterfalls (Intro)"; 2. "Gotcha"; 3. "Hit It Off" (prod. and feat. Penomeco); 4. "Rolling"; 5. "50–50" (feat. EB); 6. "Dress Code" (feat. Punchnello); 7. "Whisper" (굇속만); 8. "Tomorrow"; 9. "Scenario" (시나리오; feat. Sweden Laundry); 10. "MayDay"	9	KOR: 79,461

=== Extended plays ===
List of extended plays, with selected chart positions and sales
Title	EP details	Peak chart positions	Sales
Title	EP details	KOR	Sales
O'Clock	Released: March 26, 2019; Label: Maroo Entertainment; Formats: CD, digital download, streaming; Track listing: 1. "The Beginning of..." 2. "Us"; 3. "L.O.V.E"; 4. "Would You..."; 5. "Moon"; 6. "Young 20" (Prod. Lee Dae-hwi)	2	KOR: 109,428
360	Released: December 4, 2019; Label: Maroo Entertainment; Formats: CD, digital download, streaming; Track listing: 1. "I Am"; 2. "360"; 3. "Whistle"; 4. "Hurricane"; 5. "Casiopea" (낯별); 6. "Still Love U"; 7. "Strange" (이상해)	2	KOR: 103,392
The W	Released: May 26, 2020; Label: Maroo Entertainment; Formats: CD, digital download, streaming; Track listing: 1. "On the Rise"; 2. "Wing"; 3. "Frequency" (주파수); 4. "Driving"; 5. "Paradise"; 6. "Let's Love"	5	KOR: 85,760
My Collection	Released: August 12, 2021; Label: Maroo Entertainment; Formats: CD, digital download, streaming; Track listing: 1. "Present on the Stage (Intro)"; 2. "Gallery"; 3. "Lost (featuring lIlBOI); 4. "Strawberry"; 5. "I Wonder"; 6. "Remember" (파도에게)	4	KOR: 55,707
Hot&Cold	Released: October 28, 2021; Label: Maroo Entertainment; Formats: CD, digital download, streaming; Track listing: 1. "Escalator (Intro)"; 2. "Serious"; 3. "Want!"; 4. "Cheese"; 5. "Love Glass"; 6. "All Yours"	8	KOR: 42,713
The Answer	Released: October 12, 2022; Label: Maroo Entertainment; Formats: CD, digital download, streaming; Track listing: 1. "Silence"; 2. "Nitro"; 3. "Moon & Back"; 4. "Frame"; 5. "Don't Tell Anyone"; 6. "Midnight"	17	KOR: 50,090
Blank or Black	Released: April 12, 2023; Label: Maroo Entertainment, NHN; Formats: CD, digital download, streaming	7	KOR: 47,171

=== Single albums ===
List of single albums, with selected chart positions and sales
Title	EP details	Peak chart positions	Sales
Title	EP details	KOR	Sales
Re:Flect	Released: April 29, 2026; Label: YY Entertainment; Formats: CD, digital download, streaming; Track listing: 1. "Bodyelse"; 2. "Watercolor"; 3. "I Can't Hold Your Hand Anymore"	9	KOR: 91,682

=== Singles ===
==== As lead artist ====
List of singles, with selected chart positions, showing year released and album name
Title	Year	Peak chart positions	Album
Title	Year	KOR	Album
"L.O.V.E"	2019	59	O'Clock
"360"	2019	138	360
"Wing"	2020	109	The W
"Gotcha"	2020	102	Message
"Gallery"	2021	128	My Collection
"Serious"	2021	121	Hot&Cold
"Nitro"	2022	— (Note: "Nitro" did not enter the Circle Digital Chart, but appeared at number 10 on the component Download chart.)	The Answer
"Blank Effect"	2023	—	Blank or Black
"Bodyelse"	2026	145	Re:Flect
"—" denotes releases that did not chart or were not released in that region.

==== Other releases ====
List of other releases, with selected chart positions, showing year released and album name
Title	Year	Peak chart positions	Album
Title	Year	KOR	Album
As featured artist
"Don't Forget" (잊지마요) (Ha Sung-woon featuring Park Ji-hoon)	2019	34	My Moment
Promotional singles
"Call U Up" (featuring Lee Hi)	2021	— (Note: "Call U Up" did not enter the Gaon Digital Chart, but peaked at number 17 and 98 on the Gaon Download chart and the Gaon BGM Chart, respectively.)	Non-album single
Soundtrack appearances
"Midnight" (잡아줄게)	2020	— (Note: "Midnight" did not enter the Gaon Digital Chart, but peaked at number 19 and 98 on the Gaon Download chart and the Gaon BGM Chart, respectively.)	Love Revolution OST
"Talk To Me" (말만 해)	2021	— (Note: "Midnight" did not enter the Gaon Digital Chart, but peaked at number 47 and 77 on the Gaon Download chart and the Gaon BGM Chart, respectively.)	At a Distance, Spring Is Green OST
"—" denotes releases that did not chart or were not released in that region.

=== Music videos ===
Title	Year	Director(s)	Ref.
"L.O.V.E"	2019	Hong Won-ki, Huh Jin-hyun (Zanybros)	
"360"	2019	Yoo Sung-kyun (SUNNYVISUAL)	
"Wing"	2020	Yoo Sung-kyun (SUNNYVISUAL)	
"Gotcha"	2020	Yoo Sung-kyun (SUNNYVISUAL)	
"Hit it Off" (Prod. & Featuring Penomeco)	2020	Yoo Sung-kyun (SUNNYVISUAL)	
"Gallery"	2021	Yoo Sung-kyun (SUNNYVISUAL)	
"Serious"	2021	Zanybros	
"Moon & Back"	2022	Zanybros	
"Nitro"	2022	Zanybros	
"Blank Effect"	2023	Zanybros	

== Filmography ==
=== Film ===
Year	Title	Role	Ref.
2024	Beautiful Audrey	Kang Ki-hoon	
2026	The King's Warden	Lord Nosan / King Danjong of Joseon / Yi Hong-wi	

=== Television series ===
Year	Title	Role	Notes	Ref.
2006–2007	Jumong	Merchant's son	Bit part	
2007	The Stories of One Thousand People	Lee Dong-gyu	Episode 20	
2007–2008	Kimchi Cheese Smile	Kid	Bit part	
2007–2008	The King and I	Eunuch trainee	Episode 2	
2008	Iljimae	Villager's son	Episode 10–11	
2019	Flower Crew: Joseon Marriage Agency	Go Young-soo		
2020	Love Revolution	Gong Joo-young		
2021	At a Distance, Spring Is Green	Yeo Jun		
2022	Remarriage & Desires	Choi Yoo-seon's customer	Cameo (episode 8)	
2022	Weak Hero Class 1	Yeon Si-eun	Main Role	
2024	Love Song for Illusion	Sajo Hyun / Ak-hee		
2025	Weak Hero Class 2	Yeon Si-eun	Main Role	
2025	Tastefully Yours	Eun-jae	Cameo (episode 2, 8–10)	
2026	The Legend of Kitchen Soldier	Kang Seong-jae	Main Role	

=== Television shows ===
Year	Title	Role	Notes	Ref.
2017	Produce 101 (Season 2)	Contestant	Finished second place	
2019	Inkigayo	Special MC	Episode 1,014	
2019	Show! Music Core	Special MC	Episode 658, 718	
2022	Seven Stars	Mentor	Thai audition program	
2022	King of Mask Singer	Judge		

=== Radio shows ===
Year	Title	Role	Notes	Ref.
2021–2022	Park Ji-hoon's Stay Night	DJ	2021–October 18, 2022	

== Theater ==
- Peter Pan (2007–2009)
- The Harmonium in My Memory (2010)
- Radio Star (2010–2011)
- A Midsummer Night's Dream (2014)

== Accolades ==
=== Awards and nominations ===
Name of the award ceremony, year presented, nominated work, category and the result of the nomination
Award ceremony	Year	Category	Nominated work	Result	Ref.
APAN Music Awards	2020	Entertainer Award (Man)	Park Ji-hoon	Won	
APAN Music Awards	2020	Best Solo for Man (Global)	Park Ji-hoon	Nominated	
Asia Artist Awards	2019	StarNews Popularity Award	Park Ji-hoon	Nominated	
Asia Artist Awards	2020	Male Popularity Award	Park Ji-hoon	Nominated	
Asia Artist Awards	2021	Male Solo Singer Popularity Award	Park Ji-hoon	Nominated	
Asia Contents Awards & Global OTT Awards	2023	Best Newcomer Actor	Weak Hero Class 1	Nominated	
Asia Model Awards	2019	Asia Star Award (Singer)	Park Ji-hoon	Won	
Baeksang Arts Awards	2026	Naver Popularity Award – Male	Park Ji-hoon	Won	
Baeksang Arts Awards	2026	Best New Actor – Film	The King's Warden	Won	
Blue Dragon Film Awards	2026	Best New Actor	The King's Warden	Pending	
Blue Dragon Series Awards	2023	Best New Actor	Weak Hero Class 1	Won	
Blue Dragon Series Awards	2026	Best Actor	The Legend of Kitchen Soldier	Nominated	
Buil Film Awards	2026	Best Actor	The King's Warden	Nominated	
Buil Film Awards	2026	Best New Actor	The King's Warden	Nominated	
Buil Film Awards	2026	Star of the Year Award (Male)	Park Ji-hoon	Won	
Daejeon Special FX Film Festival (DFX OTT Awards)	2025	Best Actor	Weak Hero Class 2	Won	
Daejeon Special FX Film Festival (DFX OTT Awards)	2026	Grand Prize (Daesang) (Note: A Daesang (Korean: 대상), which translates to "Grand Prize", is the highest honor given out at South Korean award ceremonies.)	The King’s Warden	Won	
Director's Cut Awards	2026	Best New Actor – Film	The King’s Warden	Won	
Director's Cut Awards	2026	Best Actor – Television	Weak Hero Class 2	Nominated	
Fundex Awards	2025	Popular Star Prize – K-Drama Actor	Weak Hero Class 2	Won	
Fundex Awards	2025	Best Actor of OTT Original Drama	Weak Hero Class 2	Nominated	
Fundex Awards	2026	Best Actor of OTT Original Drama	The Legend of Kitchen Soldier	Pending	
Golden Disc Awards	2019	Album Bonsang	Park Ji-hoon	Nominated	
Golden Disc Awards	2019	Popularity Award	Park Ji-hoon	Nominated	
Golden Disc Awards	2019	Rookie of the Year	Park Ji-hoon	Nominated	
KBS Drama Awards	2021	Best New Actor	At a Distance, Spring Is Green	Nominated	
KBS Drama Awards	2024	Excellence Award, Actor in a Miniseries	Love Song for Illusion	Won	
Korea Drama Awards	2023	Best New Actor	Weak Hero Class 1	Won	
Korea Drama Awards	2026	Excellence Award, Actor	The Legend of Kitchen Soldier	Nominated	
Korea Drama Awards	2026	Rising Star Award	Park Ji-hoon	Won	
Korea First Brand Awards (Note: Hosted by the Korea Consumer Brand Committee and supervised by the Korea Consumer Forum, the Korea First Brand Awards selects promising brands that will lead the year and bases its winners on consumption trend analysis, extensive nationwide consumer surveys, and evaluation and deliberation by experts.)	2021	Best Idol Actor	Park Ji-hoon	Won	
Korea First Brand Awards	2022	Acting Idol (Male)	Park Ji-hoon	Won	
Korea First Brand Awards	2025	Acting Idol (Male)	Park Ji-hoon	Won	
Korean Association of Film Critics Awards	2026	Best New Actor	The King's Warden	Won	
Marie Claire Asia Star Awards	2026	Face of Asia Award	Park Ji-hoon	Won	
SEC Awards	2026	Asian Artist of the Year	Park Ji-hoon	Nominated	
Seoul Global Movie Awards	2024	Best New Actor	Beautiful Audrey	Won	
Seoul Music Awards	2019	Dance Performance Award	Park Ji-hoon	Nominated	
Seoul Music Awards	2019	K-Wave Award	Park Ji-hoon	Nominated	
Seoul Music Awards	2019	Popularity Award	Park Ji-hoon	Nominated	
Seoul Music Awards	2020	Fan PD Artist Award	Park Ji-hoon	Nominated	
Seoul Music Awards	2020	K-Wave Popularity Award	Park Ji-hoon	Nominated	
Seoul Music Awards	2020	Main Award	Park Ji-hoon	Nominated	
Seoul Music Awards	2020	Popularity Award	Park Ji-hoon	Nominated	
Soribada Best K-Music Awards	2019	Bonsang Award	Park Ji-hoon	Won	
Soribada Best K-Music Awards	2019	The New K-wave Icon Award	Park Ji-hoon	Won	
Soribada Best K-Music Awards	2019	Male Popularity Award	Park Ji-hoon	Nominated	
Soribada Best K-Music Awards	2020	Bonsang Award	Park Ji-hoon	Nominated	
Soribada Best K-Music Awards	2020	Global Artist Award	Park Ji-hoon	Nominated	
Soribada Best K-Music Awards	2020	Male Popularity Award	Park Ji-hoon	Nominated	

=== Listicles ===
Name of publisher, year listed, name of listicle, and placement
Publisher	Year	Listicle	Placement	Ref.
Joy News 24	2026	Best Movie Actor	2nd	
Joy News 24	2026	Entertainment Power People	3rd	
Joy News 24	2026	Best Drama Rising Star	5th	
Joy News 24	2026	Best Drama Actor	7th (Note: mentioned together with Kim Seon-ho, Lim Ji-yeon, and Kim You-jung)	
Sisa Journal (Note: The Sisa Journal is one of the major weekly news magazines in Korea. Established in 1989, its annually conducted 'Who Moves Korea' survey determines the most influential figures in the country and highlights next-generation leaders of Korea. The survey is conducted with Gallup Korea and compiles the picks from 500 experts across 10 fields, including professors, journalists, politicians, businessmen, and cultural artists, as well as the picks from 500 civilians, totaling to 1000.)	2026	Next Generation Leaders	Included (Note: Only two to three actors are included every year; mentioned together with Lee Jun-young)	
