= Elsholtzia rugulosa =

Scientific classification
- Kingdom: Plantae
- Clade: Tracheophytes
- Clade: Angiosperms
- Clade: Eudicots
- Clade: Asterids
- Order: Lamiales
- Family: Lamiaceae
- Genus: Elsholtzia
- Species: E. rugulosa

Binomial name
- Elsholtzia rugulosa Hemsl.

Synonyms
- Aphanochilus rugulosus (Hemsl.) Kudô (1929); Elsholtzia labordei Vaniot (1904); Elsholtzia mairei H.Lév. (1915)

Species of plant

Elsholtzia rugulosa (Chinese: 野拔子) is a species of the family Lamiaceae, native to Asia, mainly Burma, Vietnam and China. E. rugulosa is known in China as a local herbal tea, medicinal herb for colds and fever, and honey plant.
