= Love Song for Illusion =

2024 South Korean television series

- Promotional poster
- Hangul: 환상연가
- Lit.: Fantasy Sonata
- RR: Hwansangyeonga
- MR: Hwansangyŏn'ga
- Genre: Fantasy; Period; Romance
- Based on: Love Song for Illusion by Vanziun
- Developed by: KBS (planning)
- Written by: Yoon Kyung-ah
- Directed by: Lee Jung-seop
- Starring: Park Ji-hoon; Hong Ye-ji; Hwang Hee; Ji Woo
- Music by: Choi In-hee
- Country of origin: South Korea
- Original language: Korean
- No. of episodes: 16

Production
- Executive producers: Sung Jun-hae; Kim Young-jo; Lee Ye-won; Kim Deok-jin (CP); Jung Byung-hyun (CP)
- Producers: Kim Hyung-joon; Lee Eun-jin; Park Choon-ho; Nam Goong-jung; Kim Chul-min
- Cinematography: Kim Gwang-soo; Lee Joo-hoon
- Editors: Lee Re-ne; Kwon Da-hae
- Running time: 70 minutes
- Production companies: Monster Union; Fantagio
- Budget: ₩10.5 billion

Original release
- Network: KBS2
- Release: January 2 – February 27, 2024

Love Song for Illusion (Korean: 환상연가) is a 2024 South Korean television series starring Park Ji-hoon, Hong Ye-ji, Hwang Hee, and Ji Woo. Based on a Naver webtoon of the same name by Vanziun, it is about the romance and fierce obsession between a man with two conflicting personalities and a woman with a dark past. It aired on KBS2 from January 2 to February 27, 2024, every Monday and Tuesday at 22:10 (KST). It is also available for streaming on Wavve in South Korea, and on Viu and Viki in selected regions.

== Synopsis ==
Yeon Wol hides her identity and becomes an assassin to avenge her family. Her mission is to assassinate the king but fails when she falls into a trap set by an unknown person. She wakes up the next day with no memory of her past, and is appointed as the crown prince's concubine.

== Cast and characters ==
=== Main ===
- Park Ji-hoon as Sajo Hyun / Ak-hee
  - Lee Joo-won as young Sajo Hyun
  1. Sajo Hyun: the intelligent and multi-talented crown prince who works as a fashion designer at a downtown boutique while hiding his real identity.
  2. Ak-hee: Hyun's alternate personality who is charming but is cursed to feel extreme pain whenever Yeon Wol touches him.
- Hong Ye-ji as Yeon Wol / Kyera /Consort Eun-hyo
  - Kim Soo-ha as young Yeon Wol

The royal descendant of the fallen Yeon dynasty and the only daughter of Yeon Pung-hak who becomes an assassin called Gye-ra.

- Hwang Hee as Sajo Yung

Sajo Hyun's half-brother.

- Ji Woo as Crown Princess Geum-hwa / Jin Chae-ryun

Sajo Hyun's first wife who goes to any lengths to satisfy her desires.

- Kim Tae-woo as Sajo Seung

Sajo Hyun's father and the king of Asatae who overthrew the Yeon dynasty, and ascended to the throne through rebellion.

- Woo Hee-jin as Consort Cheong-myung

Sajo Seung's concubine and Sajo Yung's mother.

- Kang Shin-il as Jin Mu-dal

Jin Chae-ryun's father.

- Hwang Seok-jeong as Chung-ta

A mysterious shaman with various personalities.

=== Supporting ===
==== People around Sajo Hyun ====
- Woo Hyun as Eunuch Neung

Sajo Hyun's closest eunuch.

- Han Eun-seong as Ji Jeon-seo

Sajo Hyun's bodyguard.

==== People around Yeon Wol ====
- Kim Dong-won as Yang Jae-i

Leader of the assassin group Baramkal.

- Lee Joo-an as Ha-rang

A member of Baramkal.

- Shin Gi-hwan as Hong-gun

Yeon Wol's gungnyeo.

- Oh Ji-ho as Yeon Pung-hak

Yeon Wol's father.

- Choi Yoon-young as Eun Mi-so

Yeon Wol's mother.

==== People in the royal court ====
- Yoo Hyung-gwan as the minister of finance
- Kim Kyung-ryong as the minister of personnel
- Lee Kwan-hoon as the minister of war

==== Others ====
- Jo Han-jun as Gi-chul

Sajo Yung's loyal right-hand man.

- Moon Yu-bin as Noh Ri-sa

Geum-hwa's gungnyeo.

== Production and release ==
The first script reading of the cast was held in mid-March 2023, and filming was scheduled to begin in May.

Originally, the series was scheduled to broadcast the first two episodes consecutively on January 2, 2024, from 21:45 (KST). However, its time slot was changed to 22:10 (KST), and the broadcast of the second episode was pushed back to January 8.

== Original soundtrack ==
=== Part 1 ===
Released on January 3, 2024
No.	Title	Lyrics	Music	Artist	Length
1.	"Never Lost"	Kim Min	Kim Min	Kim Ye-ji	3:32
2.	"Never Lost" (Inst.)		Kim Min		3:32
Total length:					7:04

=== Part 2 ===
Released on January 10, 2024
No.	Title	Lyrics	Music	Artist	Length
1.	"Beneath the Moonlight" (월하)	Snnny	Snnny	Sohyang	4:02
2.	"Beneath the Moonlight" (월하; Inst.)		Snnny		4:02
Total length:					8:04

=== Part 3 ===
Released on January 17, 2024
No.	Title	Lyrics	Music	Artist	Length
1.	"I Was You, You Were Me" (나는 너니까)	Lovely E; Park Ah-reum	Chaeipapa; Lovely E	Klang	4:52
2.	"I Was You, You Were Me" (나는 너니까; Inst.)		Chaeipapa; Lovely E		4:52
Total length:					9:44

=== Part 4 ===
Released on January 31, 2024
No.	Title	Lyrics	Music	Artist	Length
1.	"Reaching You" (닿을게)	KZ; Kim Tae-young; Hoff	KZ; Kim Tae-young; Hoff	Kim So-yeon	4:01
2.	"Reaching You" (닿을게; Inst.)		KZ; Kim Tae-young; Hoff		4:01
Total length:					8:02

=== Part 5 ===
Released on February 5, 2024
No.	Title	Lyrics	Music	Artist	Length
1.	"Be My Wind" (바람이 되어줘요)	Tenzo (Papermaker); Kibi	Tenzo (Papermaker); Loogone	Kim Jae-hwan	3:54
2.	"Be My Wind" (바람이 되어줘요; Inst.)		Tenzo (Papermaker); Loogone		3:54
Total length:					7:48

== Viewership ==
Love Song for Illusion : South Korea viewers per episode (thousands)

Season	Episode number															
Season	1	2	3	4	5	6	7	8	9	10	11	12	13	14	15	16
1	727	505	N/A	N/A	N/A	N/A	N/A	N/A	N/A	N/A	N/A	N/A	N/A	N/A	N/A	N/A

Source: Audience measurement performed nationwide by Nielsen Korea.

Average TV viewership ratings
Ep.	Original broadcast date	Average audience share (Nielsen Korea)	
Ep.	Original broadcast date	Nationwide	Seoul
1	January 2, 2024	4.3% (15th)	4.3% (13th)
2	January 8, 2024	2.8% (20th)	3.0% (20th)
3	January 9, 2024	2.3% (25th)	N/A
4	January 15, 2024	2.4% (22nd)	N/A
5	January 16, 2024	2.0% (27th)	N/A
6	January 22, 2024	2.5% (25th)	N/A
7	January 23, 2024	1.8% (29th)	N/A
8	January 29, 2024	2.4% (21st)	2.4% (19th)
9	January 30, 2024	1.7% (29th)	N/A
10	February 5, 2024	2.1% (27th)	N/A
11	February 6, 2024	1.7% (29th)	N/A
12	February 13, 2024	1.4% (34th)	N/A
13	February 19, 2024	1.9% (32nd)	N/A
14	February 20, 2024	1.9% (26th)	N/A
15	February 26, 2024	2.1% (27th)	N/A
16	February 27, 2024	2.3% (22nd)	N/A
Average		2.2%	— (Note: Due to multiple unpublished ratings, the exact average rating is unknown.)
In the table above, the blue numbers represent the lowest ratings and the red numbers represent the highest ratings.; N/A denotes ratings that were not published.
