= Hong Ye-ji =

South Korean actress (born 2002)

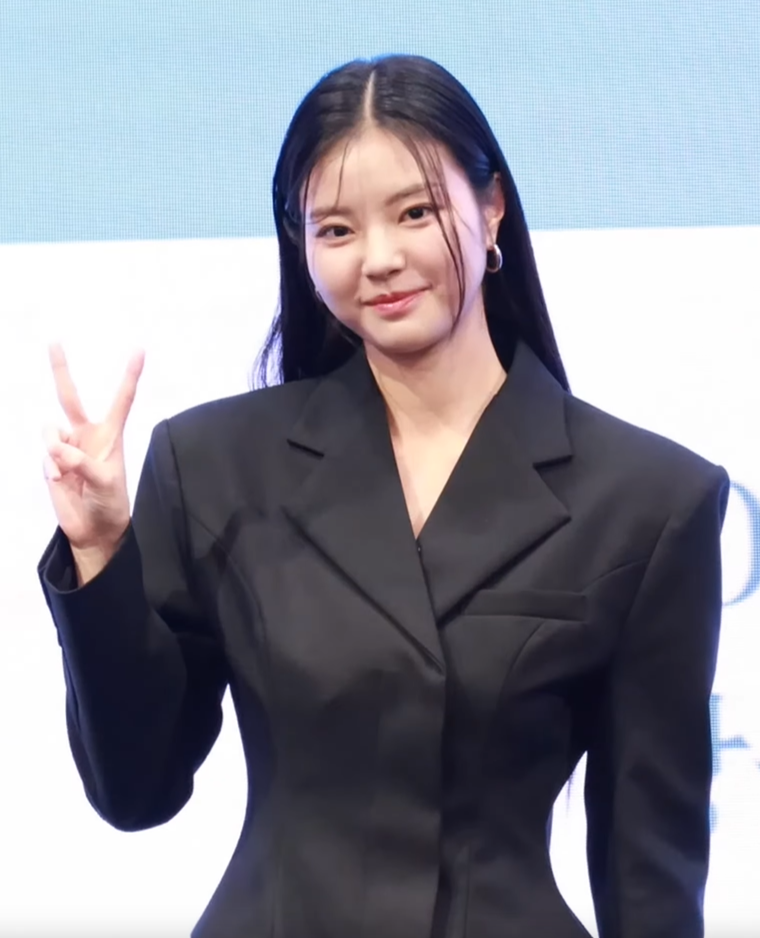
- Hong in December 2023
- Born: January 31, 2002 (age 24); South Korea
- Education: School of Performing Arts Seoul; Dongguk University
- Occupation: Actress
- Years active: 2018–present
- Agent: Big Friends

Korean name
- Hangul: 홍예지
- RR: Hong Yeji
- MR: Hong Yeji
- Website: bigwhale-ent.com/HongYeJi

Hong Ye-ji (Korean: 홍예지, born January 31, 2002) is a South Korean actress. She first gained recognition in 2018 as a participant in the reality competition show Produce 48. She made her acting debut in the film 2037 (2022). She is known for her roles in A Normal Family (2023) and the television series Love Song for Illusion (2024).

== Career ==
In June 2018, Hong Ye-ji participated in the reality competition show Produce 48 as one of the representatives of her then-label CNC, but she was eliminated on its fifth episode, finishing in 78th place. In December, it was announced that CNC signed a memorandum of understanding (MOU) with Stardium to manage the activities of their five trainees, including Hong, with an aim to debut them as a girl group in 2020.

However, in February 2021, she signed an exclusive contract with Bareuljung Entertainment to debut as an actress. In May, she was cast for the main character in director Mo Hong-jin's film 2037, under its working title Girl. In August, she, along with other actors from Bareuljung Entertainment, transferred to a newly established company Big Whale Entertainment.

Hong officially debuted as an actress with the release of 2037 on June 8, 2022, where she was praised for her performance as a 19-year-old prisoner. She also starred in a TVING short film titled School Caste, along with Jo Byeong-kyu. She then played a supporting role in the film A Normal Family, which premiered at the 2023 Toronto International Film Festival on September 14, 2023.

In October 2023, it was announced that she was cast in the television series Love Song for Illusion, which premiered on KBS2 in January 2024, marking her first small screen lead role.

== Filmography ==
Key
†	Denotes films that have not yet been released

=== Film ===
Year	Title	Role	Notes	Ref.
2022	2037	Jung Yoon-young		
2022	School Caste	Se-na	Short film	
2023	A Normal Family	Hye-yoon		
2025	Teaching Practice: Idiot Girls and School Ghost 2	Aoi / Kim Ji-soo		

=== Television series ===
Year	Title	Role	Notes	Ref.
2024	Love Song for Illusion	Yeon Wol / Kyera / Consort Eun-hyo		
2024	Missing Crown Prince	Choi Myung-yoon		
2026	Summer Vacation	Seong Sae-ryeong		
TBA	The Blue House Family †	Ma Yoon-ah	Sitcom	

=== Variety/reality show ===
Year	Title	Role	Ref.
2018	Produce 48	Contestant	

== Awards and nominations ==
Award	Year	Category	Nominated work	Result	Ref.
Blue Dragon Film Awards	2025	Best New Actress	A Normal Family	Nominated	
Buil Film Awards	2025	Best New Actress	A Normal Family	Nominated	
KBS Drama Awards	2024	Best New Actress	Love Song for Illusion	Won	
