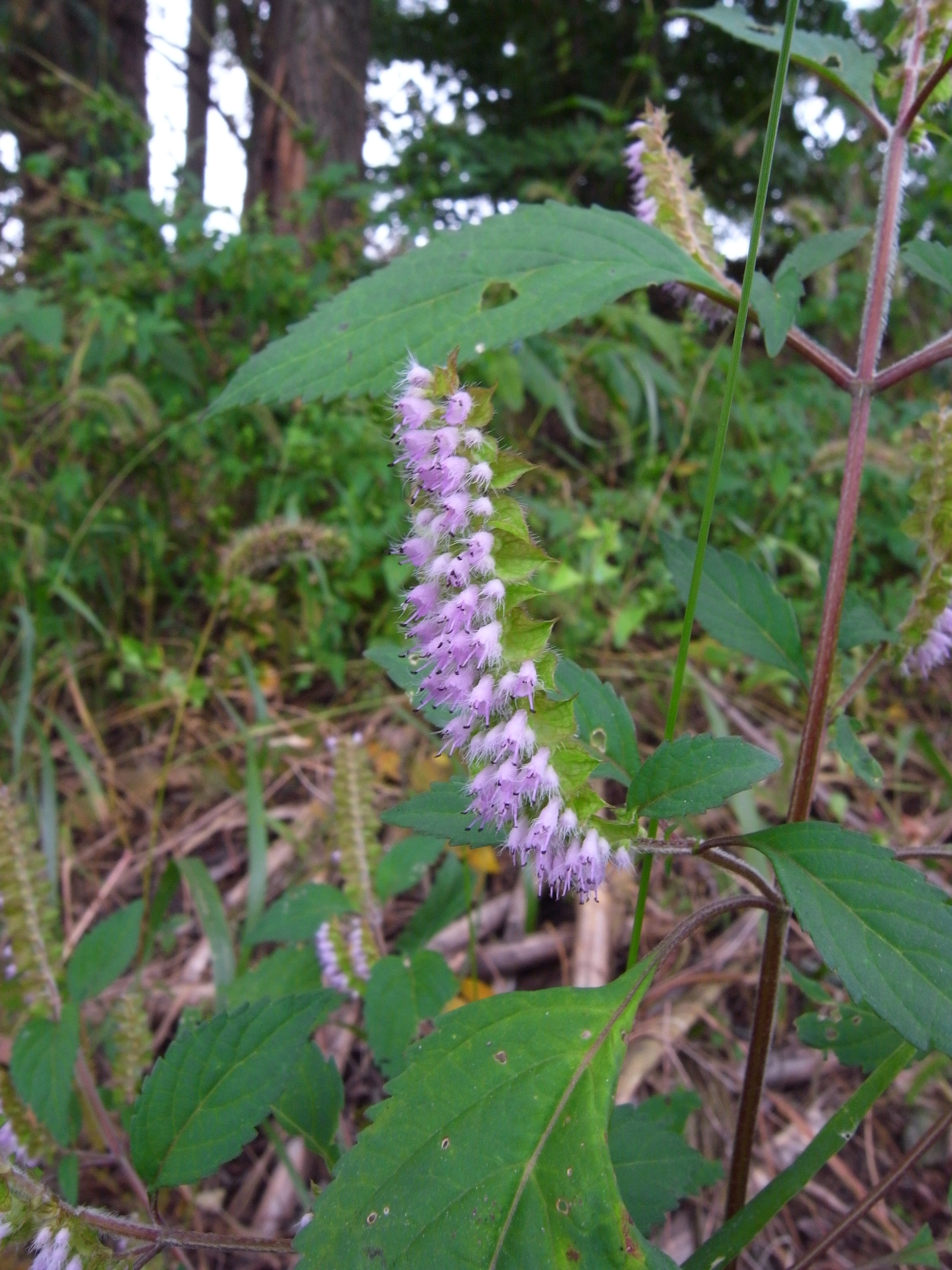

Scientific classification
- Kingdom: Plantae
- Clade: Tracheophytes
- Clade: Angiosperms
- Clade: Eudicots
- Clade: Asterids
- Order: Lamiales
- Family: Lamiaceae
- Tribe: Elsholtzieae
- Genus: Elsholtzia; Willd.

Synonyms
- Aphanochilus Benth.; Cyclostegia Benth.; Paulseniella Briq.; Platyelasma Kitag.

= Elsholtzia =

Genus of plants

Elsholtzia is a plant genus in the Lamiaceae (mint family). It is widespread across much of temperate and tropical Asia from Siberia south to China, Northeastern India, Indonesia, etc. The genus was named in honour of the Prussian naturalist Johann Sigismund Elsholtz.

Species

- Elsholtzia amurensis Prob. - Amur region of Russia
- Elsholtzia angustifolia (Loes.) Kitag. - Korea, Manchuria
- Elsholtzia argyi H.Lév. - southern China, Vietnam
- Elsholtzia beddomei C.B.Clarke ex Hook.f. - Myanmar, Thailand
- Elsholtzia blanda (Benth.) Benth. - southern China, Himalayas, Indochina, Sumatra, Viet Nam
- Elsholtzia bodinieri Vaniot - Guizhou, Yunnan
- Elsholtzia byeonsanensis M.Kim - South Korea
- Elsholtzia capituligera C.Y.Wu - Tibet, Sichuan, Yunnan
- Elsholtzia cephalantha Hand.-Mazz. - Sichuan
- Elsholtzia ciliata (Thunb.) Hyl. - widespread across Siberia, Russian Far East, China, India, Himalayas, Japan, Korea, Indochina
- Elsholtzia communis (Collett & Hemsl.) Diels - Myanmar, Thailand, Vietnam
- Elsholtzia concinna Vautier - Nepal, Sikkim, Bhutan
- Elsholtzia cyprianii (Pavol.) C.Y.Wu & S.Chow - central + southern China
- Elsholtzia densa Benth. - India, Pakistan, Nepal, Bhutan, Afghanistan, Kyrgyzstan, Tajikistan, Tibet, Xinjiang, China, Mongolia
- Elsholtzia eriocalyx C.Y.Wu & S.C.Huang - southern China
- Elsholtzia eriostachya (Benth.) Benth. - China, Tibet, Himalayas
- Elsholtzia feddei H.Lév - China, Tibet
- Elsholtzia flava Benth. - China, Himalayas
- Elsholtzia fruticosa (D.Don) Rehder - China, Himalayas, Tibet, Myanmar
- Elsholtzia glabra C.Y.Wu & S.C.Huang - China
- Elsholtzia griffithii Hook.f - Myanmar, Assam
- Elsholtzia hallasanensis Y.N.Lee - Jeju-do Island in Korea
- Elsholtzia heterophylla Diels - Yunnan, Myanmar
- Elsholtzia hunanensis Hand.-Mazz. - southern China
- Elsholtzia kachinensis Prain - southern China, Myanmar, Thailand
- Elsholtzia litangensis C.X.Pu & W.Y.Chen - Sichuan
- Elsholtzia luteola Diels - Sichuan, Yunnan
- Elsholtzia minima Nakai - Jeju-do Island in Korea
- Elsholtzia myosurus Dunn - Sichuan, Yunnan
- Elsholtzia nipponica Ohwi - Japan
- Elsholtzia ochroleuca Dunn - Sichuan, Yunnan
- Elsholtzia oldhamii Hemsl. - Taiwan
- Elsholtzia penduliflora W.W.Sm - Yunnan, Thailand, Vietnam
- Elsholtzia pilosa (Benth.) Benth. - China, Himalayas, Myanmar, Vietnam
- Elsholtzia pubescens Benth. - Java, Bali, Lombok, Timor, Sulawesi
- Elsholtzia pygmaea W.W.Sm. - Yunnan
- Elsholtzia rugulosa Hemsl - southern China, Myanmar, Thailand
- Elsholtzia serotina Kom - northern China, Japan, Korea, Primorye
- Elsholtzia souliei H.Lév. - Sichuan, Yunnan
- Elsholtzia splendens Nakai ex F.Maek. - China, Korea
- Elsholtzia stachyodes (Link) Raizada & H.O.Saxena - Indian Subcontinent, China, Myanmar
- Elsholtzia stauntonii Benth. - northern China
- Elsholtzia strobilifera (Benth.) Benth. - China, Himalayas, Myanmar
- Elsholtzia winitiana Craib - Yunnan, Guangxi, Laos, Thailand, Vietnam
