= Ajumma =

Korean word for a married or middle-aged woman

Ajumma (Korean: 아줌마), sometimes spelled ahjumma or ajoomma, is a Korean word for a married, or middle-aged woman. It comes from the Korean word ajumeoni (Korean: 아주머니). Although it is sometimes translated "aunt", it does not actually refer to a close family relationship. It is most often used to refer to a middle-aged or older woman since referring to an elder by name without a title in Korea is not socially acceptable.

'Ajumma' is a less polite term than 'ajumeoni', which means the same thing but is more respectful. In circumstances where the addressed person is not considerably older than the speaker, or is socially higher than the speaker, it is highly likely that the addressee will be offended when called ajumma. Therefore it is better to use 'ajumeoni', 'eomonim' (a respectful term for someone else's mother), or 'samonim'.

== Discussion ==
An ajumma is neither a young unmarried woman (agassi) or grandmother (halmoni). Typically she would be a married woman with children, although not necessarily so. On the other hand, the Korean word samonim was originally interpreted as "wife of mentor" or "wife of superior" and describes a married woman of high social status. The Lonely Planet guide to Seoul describes ajumma as a term of respect, but it can be used in a mildly pejorative sense as well. An ajumma is often a restaurant worker, street vendor, or housewife.

However, when ajumma is used in the sense of "aunties", it does not refer to a family relationship, and aunts in the family are not called "ajumma" in the Korean language, instead being referred to as "imo" (이모).

Korean feminists believe the low status of ajumma reflects widespread sexism and classism in Korean culture, particularly the idea that a woman's worth can be assessed mainly on the basis of her age, looks and docility. However, ajumma are Koreans' mothers, who despite their modest social status, ajumma are significant contributors to Korea's economy and society.
