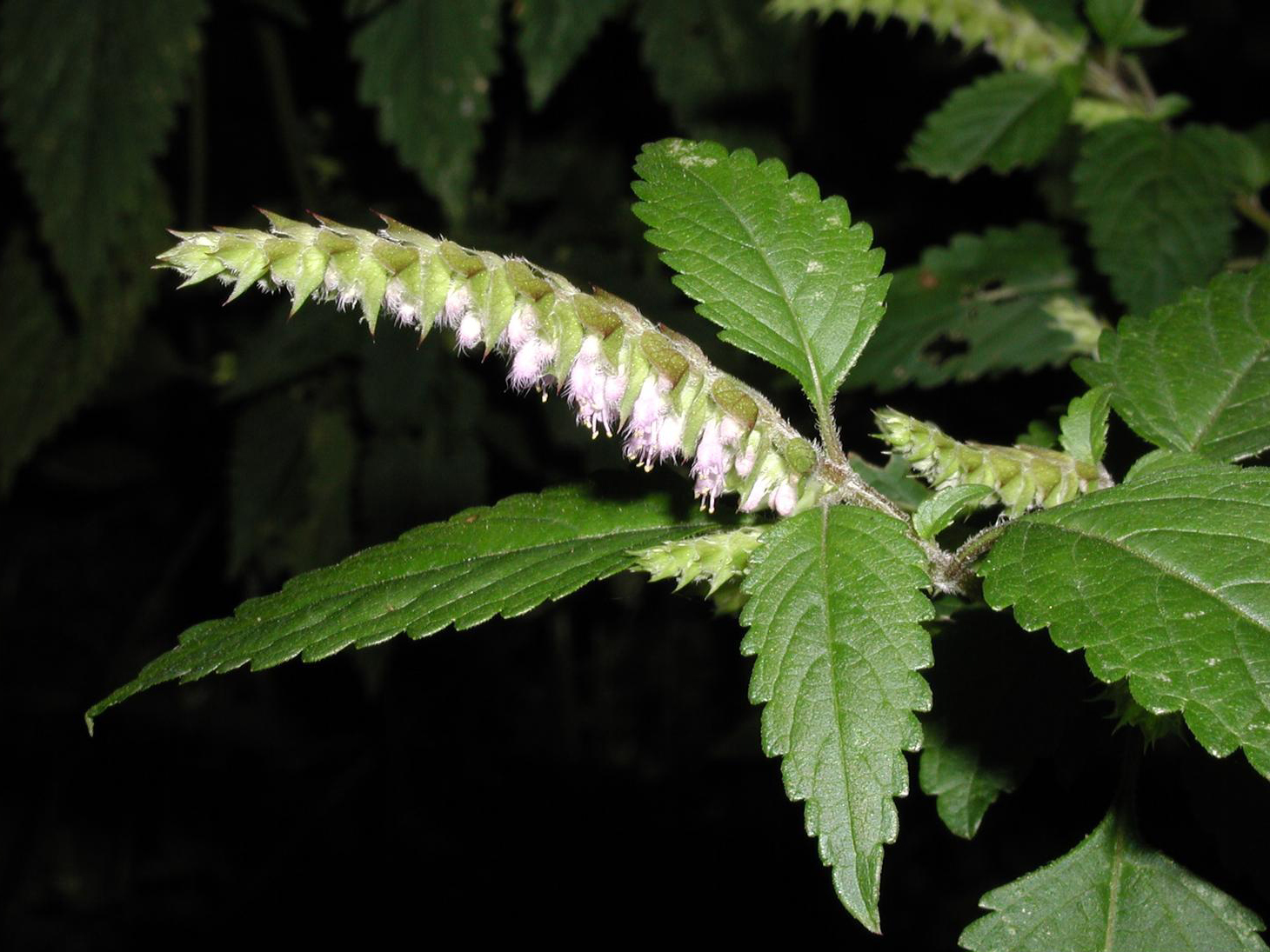

Scientific classification
- Kingdom: Plantae
- Clade: Tracheophytes
- Clade: Angiosperms
- Clade: Eudicots
- Clade: Asterids
- Order: Lamiales
- Family: Lamiaceae
- Genus: Elsholtzia
- Species: E. ciliata

Binomial name
- Elsholtzia ciliata (Thunb.) Hyl.

Synonyms
- Elsholtzia cristata, Willd. Elsholtzia patrinii, Kuntze; Sideritis ciliata, Thunb.

= Elsholtzia ciliata =

Species of flowering plant

Elsholtzia ciliata, commonly known as Vietnamese balm, comb mint, xiang ru (香薷) or kinh giới in Vietnamese, is a flowering plant in the family Lamiaceae native to Asia. In the US, it is commonly known as crested late summer mint. In US Vietnamese grocery stores, it is called kinh gioi, Vietnamese lemon balm, or Vietnamese lemon mint.

== Distribution and habitat ==
The plant is native to Asia. However, the exact extent of its original range is unclear.

It is introduced in India and parts of North American and Europe. Some of its habitats include riverbanks, forests, and hills.

== Description ==
Elsholtzia ciliata is an erect herb that grows to about 30–50 cm (12–20 in) in height. The leaves are simple and opposite with serrated margins.

== Uses ==
=== Culinary ===
Elsholtzia ciliata has many cultural uses. It is used in Vietnamese cuisine, where it is called rau kinh giới or lá kinh giới. The leaves are used to flavor meat dishes, soups, and salads with a lemony flavor.

=== Traditional medicine ===
It is commonly used in herbal medicine, as it is considered to be carminative and astringent.

== Cultivation ==
It is cultivated as an ornamental plant. It prefers moist soil, and grows mostly on exposed rocky slopes and other open, gravelly areas.

It is banned in the state of Connecticut and is classified as a noxious weed. It was first reported in the Americas in 1889.

== Gallery ==
Growing in Shangri-La, Yunnan province, China

Growing in Shangri-La, Yunnan province, China

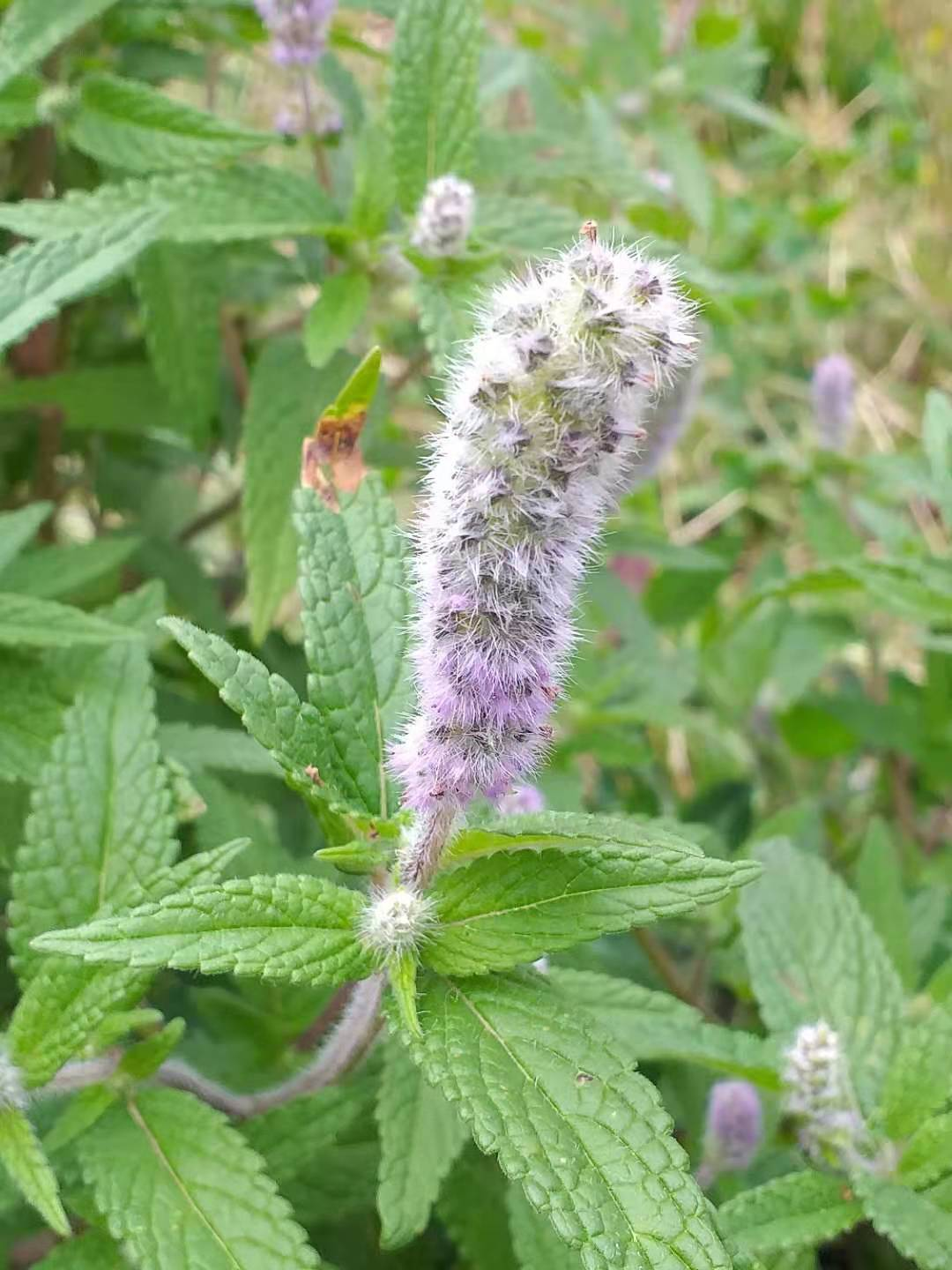
Growing in Shangri-La, Yunnan province, China
