= Trainee A =

2021–2022 South Korean boy band

- Trainee A in 2022; Left to right, standing: Jihoon, Yorch, Woochan, Sangwon, and James; Sitting: JJ and Leo

Background information
- Origin: Seoul, South Korea
- Genre: K-pop
- Years active: 2021–2022
- Label: Big Hit Entertainment
- Past members: Junil; Inhyuk; Leo; Yorch; Sangwon; Woochan; James; JJ; Jihoon

Trainee A (Korean: 트레이니 A) was a South Korean pre-debut boy band formed in 2021 by Big Hit. At the time of the group's disbandment, the lineup consisted of Yorch, Jihoon, Woochan, James, Sangwon, and JJ; former members who had left earlier included Leo, Junil, and Inhyuk. Reported to be Big Hit's next major boy group following BTS and Tomorrow X Together, it was believed that they would debut in 2022.

The pre‑debut group remained active until December 2022, when the project was cancelled and all activities were suspended. Many former members subsequently pursued other opportunities, either competing on survival programs such as Boys II Planet or later debuting with groups including Pow, TWS, Alpha Drive One, AllDay Project, and Cortis, the latter of which Big Hit debuted in 2025.

== Name ==
Trainee A's logo, as displayed on the group's social media accounts.

Trainee A was the tentative name used by the project prior to the group's planned debut, with all of the group's social media accounts were branded under that name. Big Hit registered the name Aloners Association on December 3, 2021, prompting media speculation that it might be the group's official debut name. Fans were divided over the name, with some began speculating about a fandom name and possible abbreviations, such as ALAS, while others expressed dislike for it.

== History ==
=== 2021: Formation and initial activities ===
In March 2021, several social media accounts under the name Trainee A began introducing six members, Leo, Sangwon, James, Jihoon, Junil, and Inhyuk, and attracted follows from multiple producers and executives at Hybe. The accounts left space for four additional names, suggesting either four open positions or unnamed trainees yet to be revealed. Trainee A released its first YouTube video on March 19, featuring Leo in a day in the life vlog. Later promotional material included a group photograph showing seven members, with some faces obscured by masks or emojis. In August 2021, Junil left the group, with JJ later being revealed as a member.

In December 2021, Leo drew criticism for lyrics in a video uploaded to the channel that were described as misogynistic and offensive. The production team issued a formal apology, and Leo apologized for his language, saying he had used "provocative words and expressions in order to make an impact" in the context of a competition.

=== 2022: Formal debut plans, Leo's departure, and disbandment ===
In January 2022, it was announced that Woochan, a former contestant on Show Me the Money 6, would be added to Trainee A's lineup. That same month, Inhyuk left the project, while Yorch joined the lineup. In March 2022, Leo announced that the group would hold a street performance in Los Angeles. In May 2022, Hybe confirmed the group's finalists, Leo, Sangwon, James, Jihoon, Yorch, JJ, and Woochan, with plans to debut later that year. The group released their first song as a unit, titled "No Privacy", on YouTube and SoundCloud days after, directing the music video for the song themselves.

On August 25, 2022, Leo announced his departure from the group in a video posted to the group's YouTube channel, thanking the company and apologizing to the other members and fans for his decision. In December 2022, Trainee A's social media accounts announced that all accounts would be closed on December 23, effectively ending the project and disbanding the group. Yorch later confirmed on his social media that Trainee A would not be debuting.

== Aftermath ==
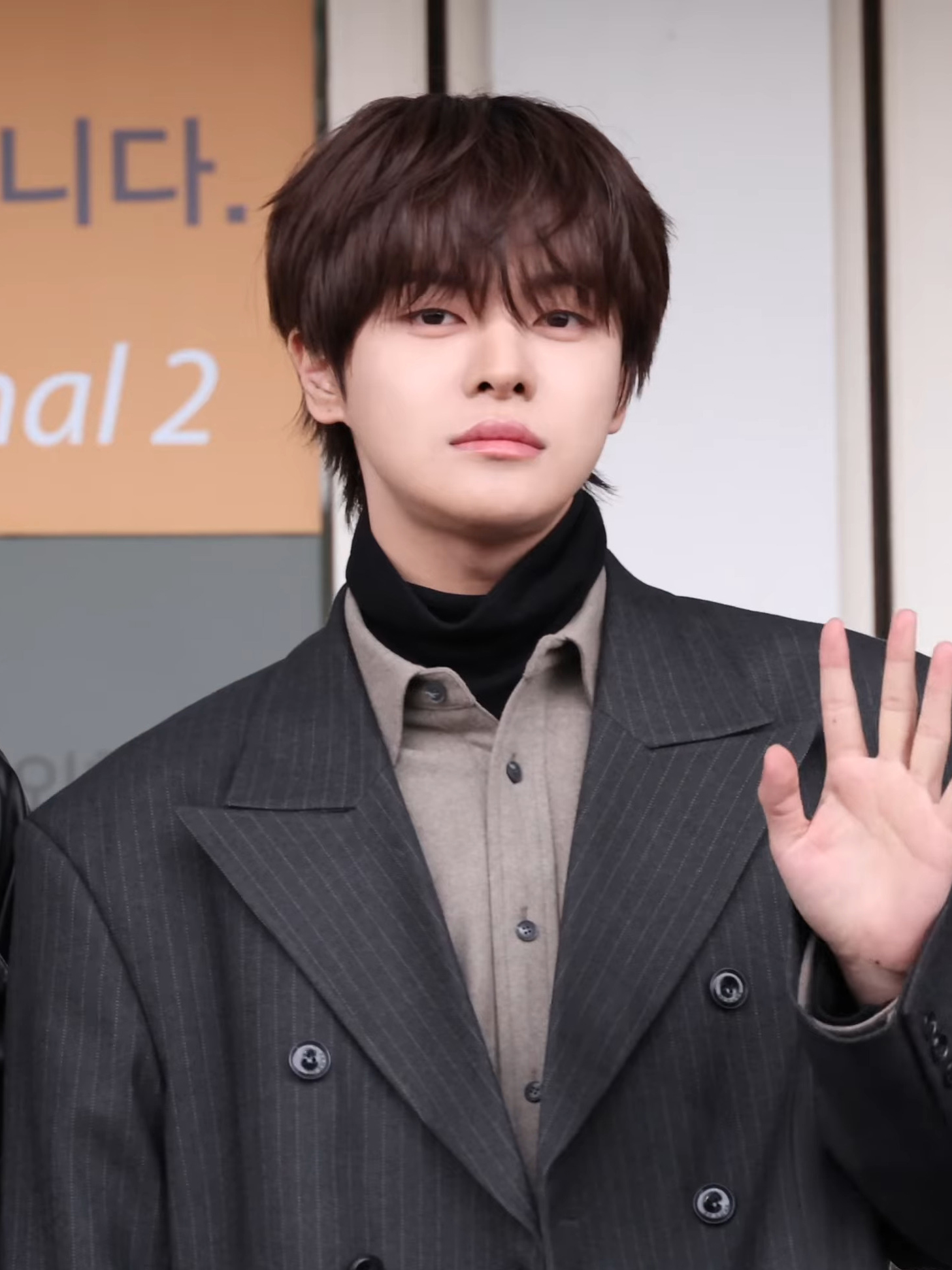
Leo of Alpha Drive One

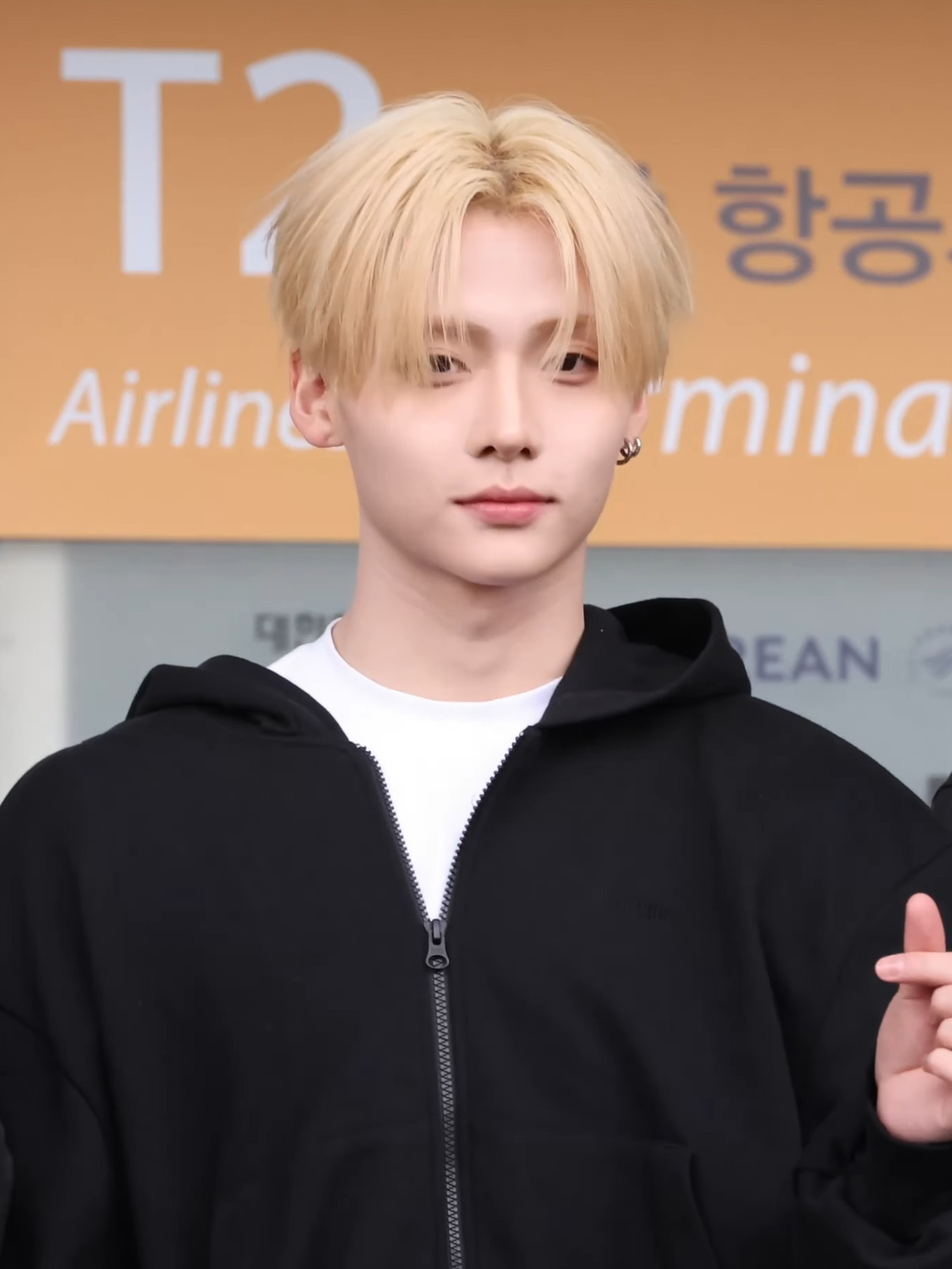
Sangwon of Alpha Drive One

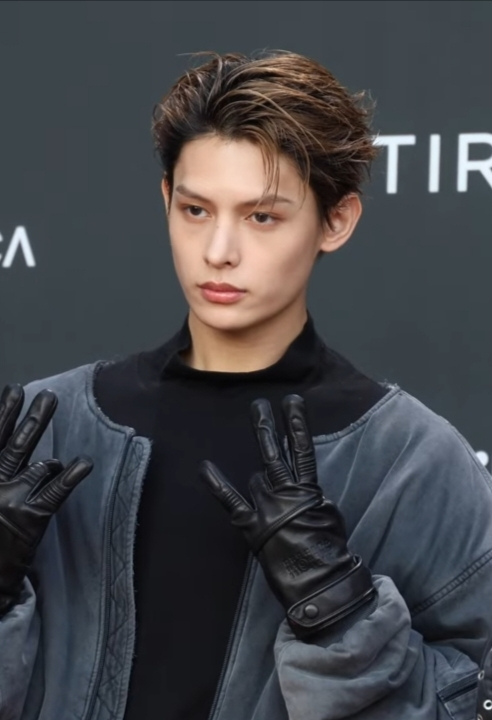
James of Cortis

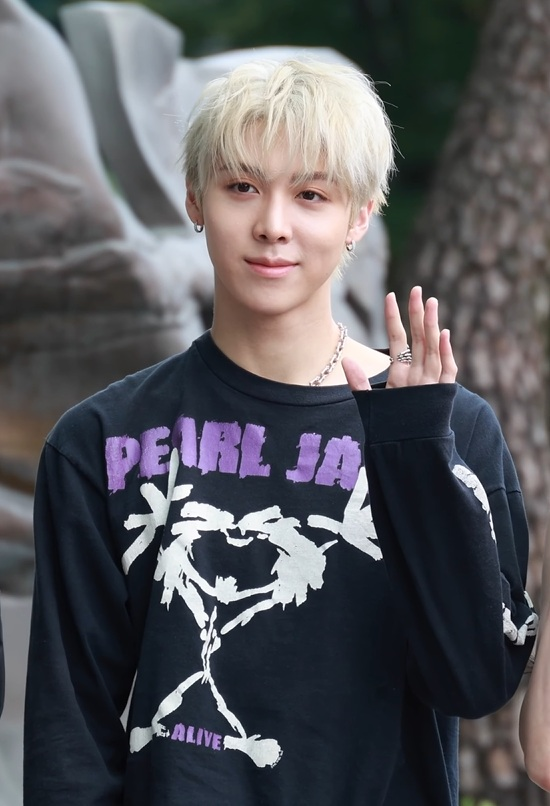
Woochan of AllDay Project

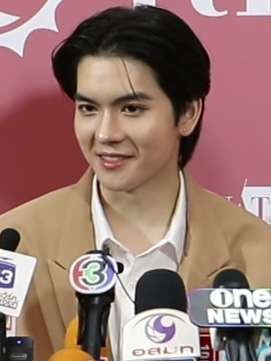
Yorch of Pow

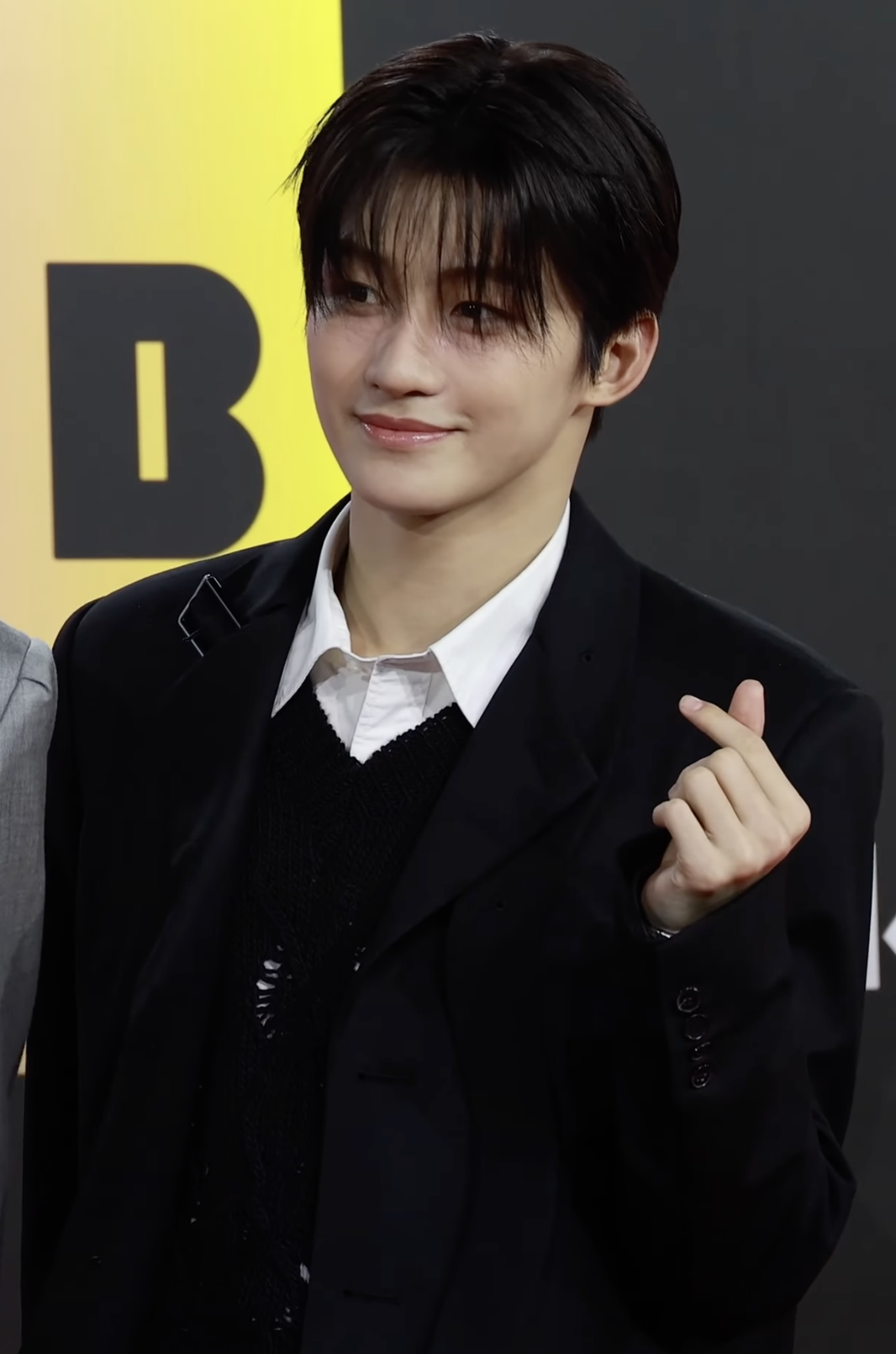
Jihoon of TWS

Members of Trainee A who later debuted in other groups after the project's disbandment.

After the group's disbandment, many members continued as trainees and later debuted with different groups. Yorch departed Hybe in 2022 and made his solo debut in April 2023. He later debuted as a member of the group Pow under Grid Entertainment in October 2023. Leo signed with 131 Label, the record company founded by rapper B.I. He made his solo debut on August 17, 2023 with the single "One Look". JJ joined SM Entertainment after failing to debut, and was later seen among 24 male trainees at SM Town Live as part of the SMTR25 lineup on February 22, 2024. It was later announced that he had joined SMTR25 and would perform under the name Justin. Jihoon was transferred from Big Hit to Pledis Entertainment, where he later debuted with the boy band TWS on January 22, 2024. Woochan left Big Hit and resumed his solo activities in April 2024 before debuting with the co‑ed group AllDay Project on June 23, 2025. James remained a trainee at Big Hit, contributing choreography and production for Hybe artists on tracks such as Illit's "Magnetic" and Tomorrow X Together's "Deja Vu" and "Miracle." In July 2025 he was announced as a member of Big Hit's new boy band Cortis, which debuted on August 18, 2025. Leo decided to compete on Boys II Planet and persuaded Sangwon to enter the competition as well. The pair were ultimately chosen as the final two members to debut from the show, joining six other contestants, with the eight members debuting as the boy band Alpha Drive One on January 12, 2026. Junil, who had joined the label Inkode via JYP Entertainment, also competed on Boys II Planet but was eliminated in the third elimination round. After leaving the project in January 2022, Inhyuk has had no publicly announced plans in music.

== Members ==
- Junil (준일)
- Inhyuk (인혁)
- Leo (리오)
- Sangwon (상원)
- James (제임스)
- Jihoon (지훈)
- Woochan (우찬)
- Yorch (요치)
- JJ (제이제이)
