= Lee Leo =

Australian singer song-writer (born 2002)

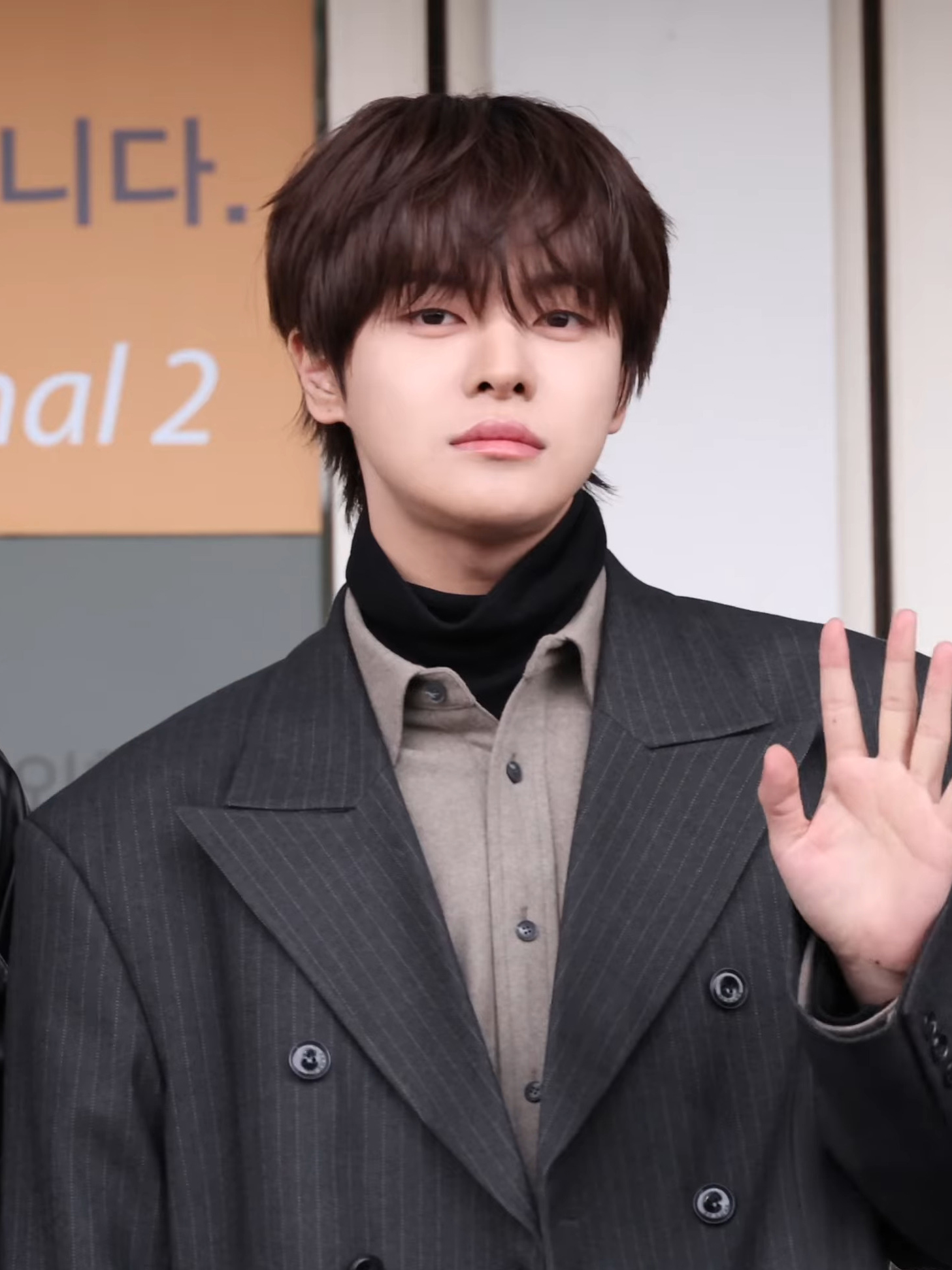
- Leo in February 2026
- Born: August 22, 2002 (age 24); Sydney, New South Wales, Australia
- Education: St Patrick's Marist College
- Occupation: Singer
- Musical career
- Genre: K-pop
- Instrument: Vocals
- Years active: 2023–present
- Labels: 131; Grid Entertainment; WakeOne (Note: As a member of Alpha Drive One only.)
- Member of: Alpha Drive One

Signature
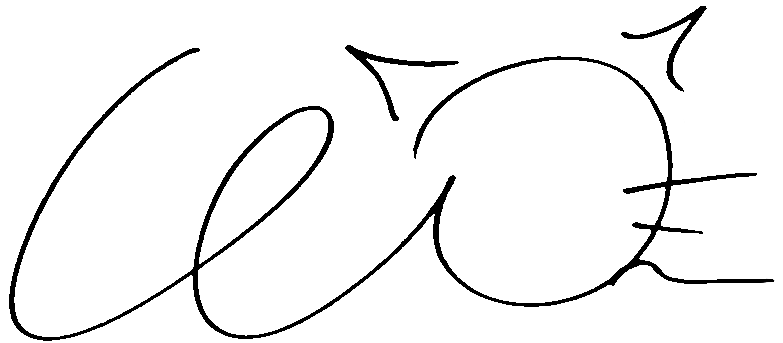

Lee Leo (Korean: 이리오; born August 22, 2002), known mononymously as Leo, is an Australian singer based in South Korea. He made his solo debut with the single "One Look" on August 17, 2023, and with his first extended play (EP) Come Closer on May 9, 2024. He later competed on the survival program Boys II Planet, finished sixth, and debuted as leader of WakeOne's boy band Alpha Drive One in January 2026.

== Early life and education ==
Lee Leo was born on August 22, 2002, in Sydney, Australia. He graduated from St Patrick's Marist College before moving to South Korea.

== Career ==
=== 2021–2023: Beginnings with pre-debut activities ===
At 17, he moved from Australia to South Korea to pursue a career in music. Leo began training under Big Hit and was announced in March 2021 as a member of the pre‑debut boy band Trainee A, alongside Lee Sang-won, James, Han Ji-hoon, Jo Woo-chan, Yorch, Justin Jay (JJ), Park Jun‑il, and Park In‑hyuk. The first video uploaded to Trainee A's YouTube channel was a day in the life vlog in which Leo introduced himself. He later appeared in the music video for BTS's "Permission to Dance". Following lineup changes during 2022, Leo announced his departure from the project on August 25, 2022, thanking the company and apologizing to fellow members and fans. The Trainee A project ceased activities and was disbanded later that year.

=== 2023–2025: Solo career debut ===
After leaving Trainee A, Leo signed with 131 Label, the record company founded by singer, rapper, songwriter, record producer B.I. He made his solo debut on August 17, 2023 with the single "One Look", produced by American production team The Stereotypes and 9AM and featuring Destiny Rogers. He performed "One Look" at the KIIS FM K‑Pop Village during KCON LA 2023 at the Los Angeles Convention Center on August 19 as part of a global promotion with iHeartMedia, and released the song's music video, filmed in Los Angeles, on August 29, 2023.

He released his first EP, Come Closer, on May 9, 2024, featuring the tracks "Pretty Plzzz" featuring B.I, "Farewell" written by B.I and White Noise Club, and was produced in part by The Stereotypes and Bangs. He performed songs from the EP on KBS2's Music Bank and MBC's Show! Music Core, where he was praised his strong stage presence and performance. He competed in the 2024 Mnet rap competition Rap:Public as a member of Block 8, but his team was eliminated after a defeat by Block 6.

His contract with the label ended in December 2024. On February 28, 2025, he independently released a fan song titled "Tenderly." Along with the release, he left the message: "It won’t be long until we meet again. Until then, this is everything I wanted you to hear. See you soon." Four months later, in June 12, fans reunited with him when he was announced as a contestant on Boys II Planet, representing GRID Entertainment.

=== 2025–present: Boys II Planet and Alpha Drive One ===
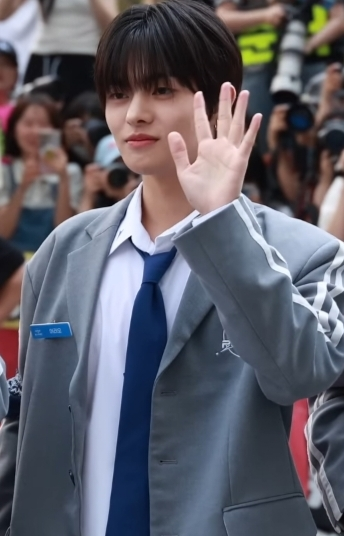
Leo in 2025, during filming for Boys II Planet

Despite his solo debut, he still had the desire to be in a group. He entered the Mnet survival competition Boys II Planet. He contacted Lee Sang-won, former Trainee A teammate, who had then considered leaving the industry and was living a civilian life, to compete and debut together through the show. The two, who had previously signed with Grid Entertainment as a duo, appeared on the show under "Planet K" where they drew attention for their cover of Enhypen's "No Doubt". Throughout the competition, the pair consistently ranked near the top from their initial appearance through the final rounds. Thai singer Yorch, former member of Trainee A and current member and leader of Pow, described them as a motivating presence for their agency and fellow trainees after joining the company and participating on the show.

At the show's conclusion, Leo was announced as one of the eight finalists selected to sign with WakeOne and form the boy band Alpha Drive One. He finished the competition in sixth place and joined the group alongside the winners, Kim Jun-seo, Zhang Jiahao, Kim Geon-woo, Lee Sang-won, He Xin-long, Zhou An-xin, Chung Sang-hyeon. Leo was later announced as the leader of the group through Instagram live from Alpha Drive One official account on November 1st, 2025. Alpha Drive One debuted on January 12, 2026, with the EP Euphoria. Leo described the debut as a "new beginning" for him and said the EP captured the "euphoric moment" for its members.

== Discography ==
=== Extended plays ===
List of extended plays, showing selected details, selected chart positions, and sales figures
Title	Details	Peak chart positions	Sales
Title	Details	KOR	Sales
Come Closer	Released: May 9, 2024; Labels: 131 Label; Formats: CD, Digital download, Streaming	14	KOR: 14,015

=== Singles ===
==== As lead artist ====
Title	Year	Album
"One Look"	2023	Come Closer
"Tenderly"	2025	Non-album single

=== Songwriting credits ===
All song credits are adapted from the Korea Music Copyright Association's database unless stated otherwise.

List of songs, showing year released, artist name, and name of the album
Year	Title	Artist(s)	Album	Composer	Lyricist	Arrangement
2023	One Look	Leo	Come Closer	Yes	Yes	No
2024	Pretty Plzzz	Leo (featuring B.I)	Come Closer	Yes	Yes	Yes
2025	Tenderly	Leo	Non-album single	Yes	Yes	No
2026	Welcome Home	Alpha Drive One	Unbreakable: 少年Beast	No	Yes	No

== Filmography ==
=== Television ===
Year	Title	Role	Notes	Ref.
2024	After School Club	Guest		
2024	Rap:Public	Contestant		
2025	Boys II Planet	Contestant	Finalist; placed 6th	
2026	Music Bank	Special MC	Along with ALD1 Kim Jun-seo	
2026	LeeMujin Service	Guest		
2026	JTBC Newsroom	Weathercaster		

=== Music video ===
Year	Artist	Title	Notes	Ref.
2021	BTS	"Permission to Dance"	Guest appearance	

== Live performances ==
=== Festivals ===
Year	Title	Venue	City	Country
2023	KIIS-FM KPOP Village In KCON LA	Gilbert Lindsay Plaza	Los Angeles	EE.UU
2023	OCTOPOP 2023	Thunderdome Stadium	Bangkok	Thailand
2023	Harley-Davidson 120 Hong Kong Music Festival	AXA x Wonderland	Hong Kong	China
2023	The Exchange TRX Countdown Party	Raintree Plaza	Kuala Lumpur	Malaysia
2024	HYPE UP FESTIVAL	Yes24 Live Hall	Seoul	South Korea
2024	131 Presents: 2024 X-mas Festival in Bangkok	Thunderdome Stadium	Bangkok	Thailand
