= Modyssey =

South Korean boy band

- Origin: Seoul, South Korea
- Genre: K-pop
- Years active: 2026–present
- Labels: Onecead; CJ ENM; NCC Entertainment
- Members: Yichen; Hengyu; Rowan; Lynnlynn; Li Zihao; Suren; Fan Zheyi

Modyssey (Korean: 모디세이; stylized in all caps) is a South Korean global-Chinese boy group formed through Mnet's spin-off reality competition show Planet C: Home Race. The group consists of seven members: Yichen, Hengyu, Rowan, Lynnlynn, Li Zihao, Suren and Fan Zheyi. They are managed by the new label Onecead, created as a joint venture between CJ ENM and NCC Entertainment, which is in itself a collaboration between JYP China and Tencent Music and a subsidiary of JYP. They debuted on April 13, 2026, with the single album 1.Got Hooked: An Addictive Symphony, with the title track, "Hook", being produced by Stray Kids' production team 3Racha.

== Name ==
The name of the group combines the letter M, which is related to the terms Music, Move and Momentum, with the word Odyssey.

== History ==
=== Formation through Planet C: Home Race ===
Modyssey was formed through Mnet's spin-off reality competition series Planet C: Home Race, which aired from December 6 to December 27, 2025. The show had 18 Planet C contestants from Boys II Planet competing to debut for a spot in a new global-Chinese boy group. Out of the 18 trainees, only the top seven would make the final lineup. All the debut members were announced in the finale episode, which was broadcast live on December 27, 2025.

Before appearing on the program, several members had already been active in the entertainment industry. Li Zihao made his debut in JYP Entertainment's Chinese boy group Boy Story on September 21, 2018. That same year, Suren took part in the MBC reality competition show Under Nineteen, but was eliminated in the final episode. In 2019, Yichen took part in the iQiyi reality competition show Youth With You, but was eliminated in the fifth episode, after ranking between 67th and 96th. Hengyu made his debut in Keystone Entertainment's boy group Blank2y on May 24, 2022, under the stage name U. In 2024, Yichen and Lynnlynn took part in the JTBC reality competition show Project 7, but both were eliminated in the final episode after ranking 12th and 20th, respectively. That same year, Rowan took part in the iQiyi reality competition show Starlight Boys, but was eliminated in the second episode, after ranking 65th. In 2025, all the members of Modyssey took part in the Mnet reality competition show Boys II Planet, with Rowan being eliminated in the second episode, after ranking 88th, Fan Zheyi, Suren, Lynnlynn, and Yichen being eliminated in the eighth episode, after ranking 25th, 28th, 34th, and 42nd, respectively, and Li Zihao and Hengyu being eliminated in the tenth episode, after ranking 19th and 20th, respectively.

=== 2026–present: Debut with 1.Got Hooked: An Addictive Symphony, 2. Multitude: How We Bloom ===
On March 18, 2026, it was announced that Modyssey would be making their official debut on April 13, with the single album 1.Got Hooked: An Addictive Symphony, alongside its lead single "Hook", which is produced by Stray Kids' production team 3Racha. Member Li Zihao was credited as a lyricist for the Chinese lyrics of the title track of the album.

Modyssey made their international debut as part of the May 9-10 line-up for KCON Japan 2026, and the August 15-16 line-up for KCON LA 2026.

On May 21, Onecead announced that Modyssey members Yichen and Li Zihao would not be able to attend the M Countdown X Mega Concert scheduled for May 30, citing internal circumstances. Modyssey would proceed with the performance as a five-member group.

On September 2, Onecead announced the start of the group's first fan concert tour "How We Bloom", named after their upcoming first EP, with stops in Osaka, Yokohama, Seoul, and Macau in October. The company later announced a stop in Shanghai in November.

On September 20, it was announced that the group's first EP 2.Multitude: How We Bloom would be released on October 12, alongside its lead single "Ridin' (Can You Hear That)". The EP features 6 tracks, with member Hengyu credited as a lyricist and composer on "Silly", and member Li Zihao being credited again as lyricist for the Chinese lyrics of the title track of the album.

== Members ==
- Yichen (이첸)
- Hengyu (헝위)
- Rowan (로완)
- Lynnlynn (린린)
- Li Zihao (리즈하오)
- Suren (수런)
- Fan Zheyi (판저이)

== Discography ==
=== Extended plays ===
Title	Details	Peak chart positions	Sales
Title	Details	KOR	Sales
2.Multitude: How We Bloom	Released: October 12, 2026; Label: Onecead; Formats: CD, digital download, streaming; Track listing: 1. "Bone Shaker"; 2. "Skit" (Note: CD exclusive); 3. "Ridin' (Can You Hear That)"; 4. "Right Now"; 5. "Silly"; 6. "Ridin' (Can You Hear That)" (Chinese ver.)	3	KOR: 353,000

=== Single albums ===
Title	Details	Peak chart positions	Sales
Title	Details	KOR	Sales
1.Got Hooked: An Addictive Symphony	Released: April 13, 2026; Label: Onecead; Formats: CD, digital download, streaming; Track listing: 1. "Hook"; 2. "Revenant"; 3. "Hook" (Chinese version); 4. "Hook" (Instrumental)	4	KOR: 302,600

=== Singles ===
List of singles, showing year released, selected chart positions, and name of the album
Title	Year	Peak chart positions	Album
Title	Year	KOR DL	Album
"Hook" (훜)	2026	74	1.Got Hooked: An Addictive Symphony
"Ridin' (Can You Hear That)" (타!)	2026	169	2.Multitude: How We Bloom

=== Other charted songs ===
Title	Year	Peak chart positions	Album
Title	Year	KOR DL	Album
"Revenant"	2026	100	1.Got Hooked: An Addictive Symphony
"Hook" (훜) (Chinese ver.)	2026	102	1.Got Hooked: An Addictive Symphony
"Hook" (Instrumental)	2026	105	1.Got Hooked: An Addictive Symphony

== Videography ==
=== Music videos ===
Title	Year	Director(s)	Ref.
"Hook"	2026	Novvkim	
"Ridin' (Can You Hear That)"	2026	Cha Han-zo	

== Live performances ==
=== Concerts and tours ===
Date	City	Country	Venue	Performed song(s)	Ref.
2026 Modyssey Fan Concert Tour <How We Bloom>
October 2, 2026	Osaka	Japan	Zepp Osaka Bayside	"Hook"; "Ridin' (Can You Hear That)" (Note: "Ridin' (Can You Hear That)" was only performed at the Seoul, Macau, and Shanghai stops); "Revenant"; "Silly"; "Right Now"; "Bone Shaker"; "Main Dish" (Boys II Planet cover); "What Makes You Beautiful" (Backstreet Boys cover); "Sailing" (Planet C: Home Race cover)	
October 4, 2026	Yokohama	Japan	KT Zepp Yokohama	"Hook"; "Ridin' (Can You Hear That)"; "Revenant"; "Silly"; "Right Now"; "Bone Shaker"; "Main Dish" (Boys II Planet cover); "What Makes You Beautiful" (Backstreet Boys cover); "Sailing" (Planet C: Home Race cover)	
October 10, 2026	Seoul	South Korea	Myunghwa Live Hall	"Hook"; "Ridin' (Can You Hear That)"; "Revenant"; "Silly"; "Right Now"; "Bone Shaker"; "Main Dish" (Boys II Planet cover); "What Makes You Beautiful" (Backstreet Boys cover); "Sailing" (Planet C: Home Race cover)	
October 25, 2026	Macau		Grand Lisbon Palace Resort	"Hook"; "Ridin' (Can You Hear That)"; "Revenant"; "Silly"; "Right Now"; "Bone Shaker"; "Main Dish" (Boys II Planet cover); "What Makes You Beautiful" (Backstreet Boys cover); "Sailing" (Planet C: Home Race cover)	
November 7, 2026	Shanghai	China	Echo Land · Changning	"Hook"; "Ridin' (Can You Hear That)"; "Revenant"; "Silly"; "Right Now"; "Bone Shaker"; "Main Dish" (Boys II Planet cover); "What Makes You Beautiful" (Backstreet Boys cover); "Sailing" (Planet C: Home Race cover)	

=== Music festivals ===
Event	Date	Location (Note: Venue, City, Country)	Performed song(s)	Ref.
Kansai Collection 2026 S/S	April 5, 2026	Kyocera Dome, Osaka, Japan	"Tambourine" (Eve cover, with Yumeki); "Sailing" (Planet C: Home Race cover)	
Inkigayo ON THE GO 2026	April 26, 2026	Paradise City, Incheon, South Korea	"Hook"	
KCON Japan 2026	May 9–10, 2026	Makuhari Messe, Chiba, Japan	"Hook"; "Revenant"; "Mr. Taxi + Drunk-Dazed" (Girls' Generation and Enhypen cover, with Flare U); "Main Dish" (Boys II Planet cover)	
M Countdown X Mega Concert 2026	May 30, 2026	Inspire Arena, Incheon, South Korea	"Hook"; "Revenant"	
K-Mega Concert in Sydney 2026	June 26, 2026	Qudos Bank Arena, Sydney, Australia	"Hook"; "Revenant"; "Main Dish" (Boys II Planet cover); "Hook (Chinese ver.)"	
NEWMARS Music Festival 2026	August 8, 2026	Qingdao Citizen Fitness Centre, Qingdao, China	"Hook"; "Lullaby" (Got7 cover)	
KCON LA 2026	August 15-16, 2026	Crypto.com Arena, Los Angeles, United States	"Hook"; "What Makes You Beautiful" (Backstreet Boys cover); "Revenant"; "Sailing" (Planet C: Home Race cover); "Main Dish" (Boys II Planet cover)	
NOL Festival 2026	October 18, 2026	KINTEX, Goyang, South Korea	"Ridin' (Can You Hear That)"; "Bone Shaker"; "Hook"	

=== Award shows ===
Event	Date	Location	Performed song(s)	Ref.
35th Seoul Music Awards	June 20, 2026	Inspire Arena, Incheon, South Korea	"Hook"	
KM Chart Awards 2026	July 25, 2026	Korea University, Seoul, South Korea	"God's Menu" (Stray Kids cover); "Hook"	
TMElive International Music Awards 2026	August 23, 2026	Kai Tak Stadium, Hong Kong, China	"Hook" (Chinese ver.)	
2026 SPOTV K-Pop Awards	September 6, 2026	KINTEX, Goyang, South Korea	"No More Dream" (BTS cover"); "Dance Break" (with Idid and POW); "Intro + Hook"	
2026 MAMA Awards	November 20, 2026	Kyocera Dome, Osaka, Japan	"Hook"; "Ridin' (Can You Hear That)" (MAMA Ver.); "That That" (Psy cover, with Tuide and Lngshot)	

== Filmography ==
=== Reality shows ===
Year	Title	Notes	Ref.
2025	Planet C: Home Race	Reality competition show determining Modyssey's members	

=== Web shows ===
Year	Title	Notes	Ref.
2026	Say Say Modyssey	Modyssey's variety show	

== Awards and nominations ==
Name of the award ceremony, year presented, award category, nominee(s) and the result of the award
Award ceremony	Year	Category	Nominee/work	Result	Ref.
KM Chart Awards	2026	KM Spotlight	Modyssey	Won	
Seoul Music Awards	2026	SMA Global Rookie Award	Modyssey	Won	
SPOTV K-pop Awards	2026	Global Connect	Modyssey	Won	
