= Boys II Planet =

2025 South Korean reality competition show

- Also known as: Planet B
- Genre: Reality competition
- Directed by: Kim Shin-young; Jung Woo-young; Ko Jeong-kyung; Lee Sang-eun (Planet C)
- Music by: Kim Ji-ung; Ryu Hyeong-seop
- Country of origin: South Korea
- Original languages: Korean; Chinese
- No. of episodes: 13

Production
- Executive producers: Yoon Shin-hye; Kim Shin-young (CP)
- Production company: Jeusworks

Original release
- Network: Mnet
- Release: July 17 – September 25, 2025

Related
- Girls Planet 999 (2021); Boys Planet (2023)

Boys II Planet

Chinese name
- Traditional Chinese: 少年2星球
- Simplified Chinese: 少年2星球
Transcriptions
Standard Mandarin
- Hanyu Pinyin: Shàonián2xīngqiú

Korean name
- Hangul: 보이즈2플래닛
Transcriptions
- Revised Romanization: Boiseu2peullaenit
- McCune–Reischauer: Poijŭ2p'ŭllaenit

Japanese name
- Kana: ボーイズ2プラネット
Transcriptions
- Romanization: Bōizu2puranetto
- Nihon-shiki: Bôizu2puranetto

Boys II Planet (Korean: 보이즈2플래닛) is a South Korean reality competition survival show created by Mnet. The show followed the process of creating a new global boy group. It premiered on Mnet on July 17 and 18, 2025, at 21:00 (KST), initially divided into two programs, but merged in episode 3. The show ended on September 25, 2025, with the formation of an eight-member boy group named Alpha Drive One.

The show serves as the sequel to Girls Planet 999 and Boys Planet. It has a spin-off show called Planet C: Home Race, featuring the previously eliminated Planet C trainees, which premiered on Mnet Plus on December 6, 2025. The show debuted a seven-member boy group known as Modyssey (stylized in all caps).

== Background and production ==
On July 29, 2024, a CJ ENM official announced that they would launch Planet B, a new Mnet program that would for the first time demonstrate the recruitment process for K-pop survival programs. In addition, men of all nationalities who were born before January 1, 2012, were eligible to apply on August 10.

On November 26, 2024, CJ ENM confirmed the launch of the second season of Boys Planet, which would be called Boys II Planet, where two groups debut simultaneously. It was slated for release in 2025 and would be broadcast simultaneously in South Korea and China.

The first round of recruitment ran from November 22, 2024, to January 26, 2025, which received applications from 105 countries. The second round of recruitment started on February 3, 2025, until March 2, across eight cities in Asia for the C version and until March 23, for the K version.

On May 13, 2025, Mnet confirmed the premiere dates of Boys II Planet to be on July 17 for the K version, and July 18 for the C version. Following the same style and premise, it comprised two distinct audition programs that were concurrently created and aired in two different languages. It was also the first-ever international K-pop twin project, as both groups would make their debuts simultaneously. On May 23, Mnet announced the changes of the show's format, from having a twin debut system to a single, unified debut group. Furthermore, by working with international partners, including those in Greater China, Mnet disclosed that they were actively looking into ways for the contestants to pursue musical endeavors outside of the show.

On June 5, 2025, Mnet announced the master lineup for the show, namely Lee Seok-hoon, Kinky, and Kany for Boys II Planet K, while Kim Jae-joong, Xiaoting, and Jrick for Boys II Planet C. To ensure that training and evaluations were fair and unbiased, Lim Han-byul, Hyolyn, Baek Koo-young, and Justhis would serve as masters for both K and C groups. In addition, Zerobaseone members' Sung Han-bin and Zhang Hao would provide advice and support to the contestants as the special idol masters.

The program would be broadcast live in South Korea via Mnet and concurrently in Japan via Mnet Japan and the streaming service Abema. Viewers in Canada, USA, Russia, Singapore, Thailand, and Vietnam would be able to access it globally through the digital portal Mnet Plus. It would also be available on the official YouTube account for the show and on TVING. More international distribution was planned, and soon after the Korean broadcast, the series was anticipated to be streamed on sites like Viu, Viki, and iQIYI. These channels would cater to audiences in the Middle East, Africa, Australia, New Zealand, Taiwan, and Southeast Asia, including countries like Singapore, Malaysia, Indonesia, Thailand, and the Philippines.

== Cast ==
- Planet Masters (MCs)
  - Ong Seong-wu (Ep. 3-5)
  - Jo Yuri (Ep. 6-7)
  - San (Ep. 10)
  - The8 (Ep. 8-9)
  - Baekho (Ep. 10)
  - Ha Sung-woon & Lee Dae-hwi (Ep. 10)
  - Kim Jae-joong (Ep. 11)
- Vocal Masters
  - Lee Seok-hoon
  - Onestar
  - Hyolyn
- Rap Master
  - Justhis
- Dance Masters
  - Baek Koo-young
  - Kinky
  - Kany
  - Shen Xiaoting (Note: C Program only) (Ep. 1-2)
  - Jrick (Ep. 1-2)
- Chief Master
  - Kim Jae-joong (Ep. 1-2)
- Special Masters
  - Sung Han-bin (Note: K Program only) (Ep. 2)
  - Zhang Hao (Ep. 2)
  - Park Gun-wook (Ep. 7)
  - Shen Xiaoting (Ep. 6-7)
  - Baekho (Ep. 7)
  - Plave (Ep. 8, Producer)

== Contestants ==
There are a total of 160 contestants participating on the show, initially divided into two planets: K and C. 80 of them were in the Planet K and primarily from Korea, alongside some from Japan, Thailand, the United States, and various other countries around the globe, while the other half were in the Planet C and primarily from Greater China, with the two Planets merging after the first two episodes.

Color key (In order of contestant's group rank on the show)

Final members of Alpha Drive One
Contestants eliminated in the final episode
Contestants eliminated in the third elimination round
Contestants eliminated in the second elimination round
Contestants eliminated in the first elimination round
Contestants eliminated in the Signal Song Test
Contestants eliminated in the Class Placement Match
Contestants that left the show

Planet K contestants
Lee Sang-won (이상원)	Kim Geon-woo (김건우)	Lee Leo (이리오)	Chung Sang-hyeon (정상현)	Kim Jun-seo (김준서)
Yoo Kang-min (유강민)	Chuei Li-yu (최립우)	Yumeki (유메키)	Jun Lee-jeong (전이정)	Kim Jun-min (김준민)
Park Dong-gyu (박동규)	Kang Woo-jin (강우진)	Masato (마사토)	Jang Han-eum (장한음)	Park Jun-il (박준일)
Na Yun-seo (나윤서)	Hsu Ching-yu (쉬칭위)	Han Harry June (한해리준)	Kim Jae-hyun (김재현)	Yoon Min (윤민)
Arctic (아틱)	Kim In-hu (김인후)	Jo Gye-hyeon (조계현)	Tatsuki (타츠키)	Seo Won (서원)
Yeom Ye-chan (염예찬)	Kim Dong-yun (김동윤)	Kim Tae-jo (김태조)	Jung Hyun-jun (정현준)	Kim Si-hwan (김시환)
Lee Dong-heon (이동헌)	Bang Jun-hyuk (방준혁)	Kim Dong-hyeon B (김동현B)	Andrew (앤드류)	Song Min-jae (송민재)
Yang Heui-chan (양희찬)	Reeonn (리온)	Kim Daniel (김다니엘)	Ham Hyun-seo (함현서)	Oh Jun-ho (오준호)
Muhn Won-jun (문원준)	Kim Dong-hyeon A (김동현A)	Aoshi (아오시)	Rensho (렌쇼)	Yusen (유센)
Yang Da-wit (양다윗)	Kim Young-jun (김영준)	Sho (쇼우)	Kim Hyeon-seo (김현서)	Noh Hui-jun (노휘준)
Lee Seung-baek (이승백)	Jang Tae-yoon (장태윤)	Lee Hyeop (이협)	Lee Won-woo (이원우)	Heo Ji-o (허지오)
Taichi (타이치)	Tomoya (토모야)	Kenshiro (켄시로)	Lee Yoon-chan (이윤찬)	Ryan (라이언)
Chris (크리스)	Hwang Sun-woo (황선우)	Shoya (쇼야)	Justin (저스틴)	Pun (빤)
Shin Jae-ha (신재하)	Choi Jun-seok (최준석)	Kim Hyun-bin (김현빈)	Park Jun-seong (박준성)	Baek Jae-hyeon (백재현)
Bang Su-hwan (방수환)	Cho Myeong-su (조명수)	Kim Min-jun (김민준)	Kim Won-bin (김원빈)	Kwon Gyu-hyung (권규형)
Moon Suhn-bin (문선빈)	Park Ji-min (박지민)	Park Nu-ri (박누리)	Thanatorn (타나톤)	Yoo Ki-won (유기원)
Planet C contestants
Zhou Anxin (周安信)	He Xinlong (贺鑫隆)	Zhang Jiahao (张家豪)	Chen Kaiwen (陈凯文)	Li Zihao (李梓豪)
Sun Hengyu (孙亨裕)	Hu Hanwen (胡瀚文)	Fan Zheyi (范哲逸)	Xue Suren (薛苏仁)	He Zhongxing (贺仲星)
Nian Boheng (年博恒)	Sen (仙)	Zhao Guangxu (赵光旭)	Sun Jiayang (孙佳洋)	Peng Jinyu (彭锦煜)
Yi Chen (亦辰)	Chen Bowen (陈博文)	Dang Hong Hai (邓红海)	Zhang Shunyu (张舜禹)	Guo Zhen (郭震)
Hong Zih-hao (洪子皓)	Jiang Fan (姜帆)	Bian Shiyu (卞士宇)	Taiga (大雅)	Hong Zhihan (洪智函)
Dong Jingkun (董靖坤)	Ko Ming-chieh (柯茗杰)	Chrisen Yang (克里森 杨)	Cai Jinxin (蔡锦昕)	Xuan Hao (宣淏)
Lim Jack (林杰)	Xie Binghua (谢秉桦)	Krystian (克里斯蒂安)	He Junjin (何俊锦)	Ngan Chau-yuet (颜秋越)
Zhou Zheng (周政)	Jia Hanyu (贾涵予)	Sang Lin (桑淋)	Lin Ching-en (林擎恩)	Zheng Kun (郑坤)
Zhou Yanhe (周言赫)	Wang Zhongzhi (王忠智)	Han Ruize (韩瑞泽)	Long Guohao (龙国浩)	Zheng Renyu (郑人予)
Wang Dongyi (王东熠)	Chen Li-chi (陳立其)	Xie Yuxin (解雨鑫)	Chen Jinxin (陈金鑫)	Wong Sik-hei (黄锡熙)
Chen Zishuo (陈梓烁)	Phoenix (菲尼克斯)	Huang Hsin-yu (黄薪祐)	Yuan Wei (袁威)	Sun Hanlin (孙涵霖)
Xie Jiahui (谢家辉)	Wang Shenglin (王圣琳)	Dong Ziqi (董子奇)	Zhang Yuxi (张宇熙)	Yang Jiapeng (杨佳鹏)
Zhang Yihua (张艺华)	Zhang Shiyi (张释艺)	Weng Weidong (翁伟栋)	Qiao Guanzhen (乔冠臻)	Chen Yuqi (陈禹圻)
Lin Qiunan (林秋楠)	Luo Junwei (罗俊炜)	Chen Chaoyu (陳昭宇)	Han Jiangyu (韩江宇)	He Jiahao (何嘉浩)
Li Xiaodi (李筱迪)	Li Zheng'en (李政恩)	Lin Xinrui (林锌锐)	Ma Tao (马韬)	Qi Lin (麒麟)
Teng Chia-chun (邓佳骏)	Wang Canruo (王灿若)	Yeung Yuk-him (杨煜谦)	Yuan Peiyi (袁培艺)	Zeng Shangxuan (曾上轩)

== Ranking ==
=== Top 8 ===
The top eight contestants are determined through popularity with online voting and audience live voting, or by the masters themselves, and the results are shown at the beginning, during, or at the end of each episode.

Color key

New Top 8 (Note: Indicates contestants who had never placed in the Top 8 in any prior elimination rounds or ranking announcements.)
Returned to Top 8 (Note: Indicates contestants who had placed in the Top 8 in a prior elimination round or ranking announcement, then had placed out of it, and then had come back)

List of Top 8 contestants
#	Ep. 1		Ep. 2		Ep. 3	Ep. 5	Ep. 8	Ep. 10	Ep. 11
#	K	C	K	C	Ep. 3	Ep. 5	Ep. 8	Ep. 10	Ep. 11
1	Lee Sang-won	Zhou Anxin	Lee Sang-won	Zhou Anxin	Lee Sang-won	Lee Sang-won	Lee Sang-won	Lee Sang-won	Lee Sang-won
2	Yoo Kang-min	Cai Jinxin	Lee Leo (▲3)	Fan Zheyi (▲1)	Zhou Anxin (▼1)	Zhou Anxin	Zhou Anxin	Zhou Anxin	Zhou Anxin
3	Chung; Sang-hyeon	Fan Zheyi	Yoo Kang-min (▼1)	Sun Jiayang (▲2)	Chuei Li-yu (▲1)	Chung Sang- hyeon (▲1)	Lee Leo (▲2)	Lee Leo	He Xinlong (▲3)
4	Chuei Li-yu	Yi Chen	Chuei Li-yu	Sun Hengyu (▲49)	Chung Sang- hyeon (▲2)	Kim Jun-seo (▲2)	He Xinlong (▲5)	Kim Geon-woo (▲3)	Kim Geon-woo
5	Lee Leo	Sun Jiayang	Kang Woo-jin (▲20)	Cai Jinxin (▼3)	Lee Leo (▼3)	Lee Leo	Kim Jun-seo (▼1)	Zhang Jiahao (▲14)	Zhang Jiahao
6	Masato	Peng Jinyu	Chung Sang- hyeon (▼3)	Chen Kaiwen (▲2)	Kim Jun-seo (▲2)	Chuei Li-yu (▼3)	Chung Sang- hyeon (▼3)	He Xinlong (▼2)	Lee Leo (▼3)
7	Kim; Geon-woo	Xuan Hao	Masato (▼1)	Yi Chen (▼3)	Yoo Kang-min (▼4)	Yoo Kang-min	Kim Geon-woo (▲9)	Kim Jun-seo (▼2)	Chung Sang- hyeon (▲1)
8	Kim Jun-seo	Chen Kaiwen	Kim Jun-seo	Zhang Jiahao (▲4)	Masato (▼1)	Masato	Yoo Kang-min (▼1)	Chung Sang- hyeon (▼2)	Kim Jun-seo (▼1)

=== 1st Survival Announcement ===
The first K and C voting period took place from July 17/18, 2025, to July 24/25, 2025. Star Creators would vote for their top eight contestants out of each of the respective contestant pool. The second global voting period took place from July 26, to August 8, 2025. Star Creators would again vote for their top eight contestants out of the 80 contestants who remained on the show. The final global live vote took place for one hour on August 8, 2025, where Star Creators would vote for one contestant out of the four candidates for 48th place. The votes from the all three relevant voting periods would be combined to determine the rankings of each contestant at the 1st Survival Announcement Ceremony.

Color key

Top 8

1st Survival Announcement (Episode 5)
Rank	Contestants	Points					Class	Rank	Contestants	Points					Class
Rank	Contestants	Votes			Benefit Points	Total	Class	Rank	Contestants	Votes			Benefit Points	Total	Class
Rank	Contestants	1st K/C Vote	2nd Global Vote		Benefit Points	Total	Class	Rank	Contestants	1st K/C Vote	2nd Global Vote		Benefit Points	Total	Class
Rank	Contestants	1st K/C Vote	Korean	Global	Benefit Points	Total	Class	Rank	Contestants	1st K/C Vote	Korean	Global	Benefit Points	Total	Class
1	Lee Sang-won	2,526,097	1,111,304	3,838,888	100,000	12,497,772	3/3 stars	25	Hu Hanwen	655,225	293,064	310,413	0	2,350,980	2/3 stars
2	Zhou Anxin	2,407,739	1,011,264	3,326,600	100,000	11,275,276	3/3 stars	26	Sen	839,138	90,133	647,373	100,000	2,174,155	2/3 stars
3	Chung Sang-hyeon	1,485,862	1,020,169	1,376,357	300,000	8,071,897	3/3 stars	27	Kim Jun-min	302,213	137,163	859,860	100,000	2,119,619	2/3 stars
4	Kim Jun-seo	1,008,541	811,172	2,447,917	100,000	7,936,328	3/3 stars	28	Peng Jinyu	983,763	177,251	177,457	0	1,996,214	2/3 stars
5	Lee Leo	1,715,851	574,084	2,552,121	100,000	7,650,903	3/3 stars	29	Park Dong-gyu	496,802	138,040	577,174	100,000	1,952,689	2/3 stars
6	Chuei Li-yu	1,662,951	868,085	1,370,271	300,000	7,569,231	3/3 stars	30	Dang Hong Hai	643,215	112,549	540,799	100,000	1,939,468	2/3 stars
7	Yoo Kang-min	1,694,264	521,380	1,897,650	100,000	6,550,521	3/3 stars	31	Li Zihao	254,945	222,781	386,626	100,000	1,838,909	2/3 stars
8	Masato	1,149,060	696,503	1,663,655	100,000	6,476,533	3/3 stars	32	Chen Bowen	641,899	64,238	706,275	0	1,838,611	2/3 stars
9	He Xinlong	666,330	429,354	2,182,072	0	5,383,665	3/3 stars	33	Kim Jae-hyun	399,082	226,313	333,811	0	1,830,383	2/3 stars
10	Kang Woo-jin	1,534,862	243,346	1,590,665	300,000	4,965,995	3/3 stars	34	Zhao Guangxu	628,141	38,920	723,677	0	1,735,494	2/3 stars
11	Sun Hengyu	1,434,089	399,840	1,001,105	100,000	4,594,541	3/3 stars	35	Park Jun-il	405,124	125,907	490,990	100,000	1,696,009	2/3 stars
12	Jang Han-eum	395,865	644,234	231,949	300,000	3,841,826	3/3 stars	36	He Zhongxing	456,232	161,336	359,092	0	1,633,150	2/3 stars
13	Fan Zheyi	1,546,848	252,271	861,367	0	3,775,085	3/3 stars	37	Kim Dong-yun	285,462	97,484	357,439	0	1,178,152	2/3 stars
14	Hsu Ching-yu	961,297	206,338	1,349,857	100,000	3,717,670	3/3 stars	38	Tatsuki	285,842	81,950	319,207	100,000	1,160,487	2/3 stars
15	Sun Jiayang	1,497,217	402,352	291,463	0	3,651,499	3/3 stars	39	Yeom Ye-chan	434,273	44,976	387,462	0	1,133,796	2/3 stars
16	Kim Geon-woo	941,392	323,370	845,366	100,000	3,562,704	3/3 stars	40	Jo Gye-hyeon	315,115	102,346	171,526	100,000	1,088,978	2/3 stars
17	Yumeki	919,959	142,810	1,370,046	100,000	3,421,769	3/3 stars	41	Jung Hyun-jun	81,500	68,819	534,995	0	1,077,054	2/3 stars
18	Zhang Jiahao	1,005,735	82,160	1,127,998	100,000	2,926,734	3/3 stars	42	Kim Tae-jo	270,284	60,721	275,306	0	894,396	2/3 stars
19	Yi Chen	1,013,173	118,264	822,316	300,000	2,898,457	3/3 stars	43	Kim Si-hwan	166,586	49,023	214,000	100,000	759,775	2/3 stars
20	Seo Won	798,526	233,841	651,328	100,000	2,773,500	3/3 stars	44	Kim In-hu	90,409	71,149	193,100	100,000	754,333	2/3 stars
21	Chen Kaiwen	1,050,819	123,907	890,116	0	2,748,770	3/3 stars	45	Arctic	142,926	23,593	159,206	300,000	752,943	2/3 stars
22	Na Yun-seo	366,005	317,972	749,759	0	2,739,890	3/3 stars	46	Xue Suren	104,664	27,458	320,804	100,000	740,634	2/3 stars
23	Jun Lee-jeong	286,080	298,314	450,857	300,000	2,486,764	3/3 stars	47	Han Harry June	130,173	34,924	242,571	100,000	698,005	2/3 stars
24	Nian Boheng	728,139	94,861	947,978	0	2,372,560	3/3 stars	48	Yoon Min	93,994	44,186	222,500	100,000	676,801 (Note: The contestants who were candidates 48th place candidates all got an extra set of votes to determine who it would be: Yoon Min's Extra: 198,730; Total: 875,531)	2/3 stars

=== 2nd Survival Announcement ===
The third global voting period took place from August 14, to August 29, 2025. Star Creators would vote for their top five contestants out of the 48 contestants who remained on the show. The final global live vote took place for one hour on August 29, 2025, where Star Creators would vote for one contestant out of the three candidates for 24th place. The votes from the relevant voting periods would be combined to determine the rankings of each contestant at the 2nd Survival Announcement Ceremony.

Color key

Top 8

2nd Survival Announcement (Episode 8)
Rank	Contestants	Points					Class	Rank	Contestants	Points					Class
Rank	Contestants	Votes			Benefit Points	Total	Class	Rank	Contestants	Votes			Benefit Points	Total	Class
Rank	Contestants	Korean	Global	Total	Benefit Points	Total	Class	Rank	Contestants	Korean	Global	Total	Benefit Points	Total	Class
1	Lee Sang-won	1,168,785	5,356,077	12,417,136	200,000	12,617,136	3/3 stars	13	Park Jun-il (▲22)	449,730	1,255,296	3,763,108	250,000	4,013,108	3/3 stars
2	Zhou Anxin	759,240	4,759,206	9,678,363	200,000	9,878,363	3/3 stars	14	Jang Han-eum (▼2)	694,494	295,655	3,741,799	250,000	3,991,799	3/3 stars
3	Lee Leo (▲2)	680,040	3,680,248	7,935,026	0	7,935,026	3/3 stars	15	Sun Hengyu (▼4)	351,765	1,198,565	3,216,364	200,000	3,416,364	3/3 stars
4	He Xinlong (▲5)	577,720	3,217,779	6,856,072	250,000	7,106,072	3/3 stars	16	Kang Woo-jin (▼6)	254,983	1,496,041	3,121,531	0	3,121,531	3/3 stars
5	Kim Jun-seo (▼1)	549,744	3,079,870	6,546,629	200,000	6,746,629	3/3 stars	17	Li Zihao (▲14)	366,186	1,030,093	3,074,115	0	3,074,115	3/3 stars
6	Chung Sang-hyeon (▼3)	882,350	1,393,265	6,035,782	200,000	6,235,782	3/3 stars	18	Chen Kaiwen (▲3)	186,458	1,406,473	2,676,255	200,000	2,876,255	3/3 stars
7	Kim Geon-woo (▲9)	749,980	1,685,086	5,761,169	250,000	6,011,169	3/3 stars	19	Zhang Jiahao (▼1)	116,266	1,456,951	2,399,298	200,000	2,599,298	3/3 stars
8	Yoo Kang-min (▼1)	548,385	1,986,832	5,163,207	0	5,163,207	3/3 stars	20	Na Yun-seo (▲2)	314,849	682,677	2,387,433	200,000	2,587,433	3/3 stars
9	Masato (▼1)	544,047	1,967,221	5,117,459	0	5,117,459	3/3 stars	21	Hsu Ching-yu (▼7)	183,666	1,247,667	2,462,672	0	2,462,672	3/3 stars
10	Chuei Li-yu (▼4)	610,151	1,392,895	4,714,725	50,000	4,764,725	3/3 stars	22	Yumeki (▼5)	111,514	1,457,297	2,376,679	0	2,376,679	3/3 stars
11	Kim Jun-min (▲16)	438,954	1,709,480	4,282,934	200,000	4,482,934	3/3 stars	23	Hu Hanwen (▲2)	306,387	489,475	2,103,015	200,000	2,303,015	3/3 stars
12	Jun Lee-jeong (▲11)	580,242	1,062,120	4,152,964	200,000	4,352,964	3/3 stars	24	Park Dong-gyu (▲5)	194,905	829,179	1,990,056	200,000	2,190,056 (Note: The contestants who were candidates 24th place candidates all got an extra set of votes to determine who it would be: Park Dong-gyu's Extra: 490,002; Total: 2,680,058)	3/3 stars

=== 3rd Survival Announcement ===
The fourth global voting period took place from September 4, to September 12, 2025. Star Creators would vote for their top three contestants out of the 24 contestants who remained on the show. The votes from the voting period would determine the rankings of each contestant at the 3rd Survival Announcement Ceremony.

Color key

Top 8

3rd Survival Announcement (Episode 10)
Rank	Contestants	Points					Class	Rank	Contestants	Points					Class
Rank	Contestants	Votes			Benefit Points	Total	Class	Rank	Contestants	Votes			Benefit Points	Total	Class
Rank	Contestants	Korean	Global	Total	Benefit Points	Total	Class	Rank	Contestants	Korean	Global	Total	Benefit Points	Total	Class
1	Lee Sang-won	707,521	3,424,312	7,974,830	313,000	8,287,830	3/3 stars	9	Yumeki (▲13)	120,520	1,739,714	2,783,273	0	2,783,273	3/3 stars
2	Zhou Anxin	453,838	2,568,155	5,573,338	163,000	5,736,338	3/3 stars	10	Chuei Li-yu	310,959	807,727	2,645,855	0	2,645,855	3/3 stars
3	Lee Leo	269,293	2,011,547	3,907,925	163,000	4,070,925	3/3 stars	11	Yoo Kang-min (▼3)	271,923	964,458	2,631,753	0	2,631,753	3/3 stars
4	Kim Geon-woo (▲3)	342,695	904,554	2,933,619	163,000	3,096,619	3/3 stars	12	Chen Kaiwen (▲6)	228,161	1,125,983	2,598,471	0	2,598,471	3/3 stars
5	Zhang Jiahao (▲14)	191,437	1,467,026	2,823,735	163,000	2,986,735	3/3 stars	13	Kim Jun-min (▼2)	285,873	859,236	2,576,158	0	2,576,158	3/3 stars
6	He Xinlong (▼2)	240,338	1,364,754	2,957,303	0	2,957,303	3/3 stars	14	Park Dong-gyu (▲10)	337,540	630,508	2,568,600	0	2,568,600	3/3 stars
7	Kim Jun-seo (▼2)	125,184	1,757,254	2,829,642	0	2,829,642	3/3 stars	15	Jun Lee-jeong (▼3)	284,678	683,692	2,353,524	163,000	2,516,524	3/3 stars
8	Chung Sang-hyeon (▼2)	369,706	683,912	2,805,144	0	2,805,144	3/3 stars	16	Kang Woo-jin	175,221	1,225,463	2,440,024	0	2,440,024	3/3 stars

=== Final Survival Announcement ===
The first final global voting period took place from September 18, to September 25, 2025. Star Creators would vote for their one pick contestant out of the 16 contestants who remained on the show. The second final global voting period took place during the airing of Episode 11. Star Creators would again vote for their one pick contestant out of the 16 contestants who remained on the show, with the votes conducted during this voting period doubled in value. The votes from both voting periods would be combined to determine the rankings of each contestant in the Final Live Announcement.

Color key

Top 8

Final Survival Announcement (Episode 11)
Rank	Contestants	Planet	Points	Company	Rank	Contestants	Planet	Points	Company
1	Lee Sang-won	K	7,293,777	Grid Entertainment	9	Yoo Kang-min (▲2)	K	3,548,388	Jellyfish Entertainment
2	Zhou Anxin	C	5,950,137	Nouer Entertainment	10	Chuei Li-yu	K	3,284,175	FNC Entertainment
3	He Xinlong (▲3)	C	5,731,887	NCC Entertainment	11	Yumeki (▼2)	K	2,749,632	Grigo Entertainment
4	Kim Geon-woo	K	4,854,331	None (Note: Competed as an individual trainee.)	12	Jun Lee-jeong (▲3)	K	2,474,319	C-JeS Studios
5	Zhang Jiahao	C	4,238,175	Nouer Entertainment	13	Kim Jun-min	K	2,424,154	C-JeS Studios
6	Lee Leo (▼3)	K	4,147,134	Grid Entertainment	14	Chen Kaiwen (▼2)	C	2,111,260	Chromosome
7	Chung Sang- hyeon (▲1)	K	3,862,466	WakeOne	15	Park Dong-gyu (▼1)	K	1,862,464	IST Entertainment
8	Kim Jun-seo (▼1)	K	3,856,677	Oui Entertainment	16	Kang Woo-jin	K	1,823,699	None

== Episodes ==
No. overall	No. in season	Title	Original release date
1	K1 C1	"You See the Fire? The Fire Has Been Lit"; Transliteration: "You see the fire? "Buri bureotda"" (Korean: You see the fire? "불이 불었다")	July 17, 2025
1	K1 C1	"You See the Fire? Burning Blood"; Transliteration: "You see the fire? "Piga kkeulleunda"" (Korean: You see the fire? "피가 끓는다")	July 18, 2025
2	K2 C2	"Stronger Energy, Let's Go and Be Confident!"; Transliteration: "Deo ganghaejin eneoji "Gaja! Dangdanghage"" (Korean: 더 강해진 에너지 "가자! 당당하게")	July 24, 2025
2	K2 C2	"Stronger Energy, Protect the All Star"; Transliteration: "Deo ganghaejin eneoji "Allseutareul jikyeoya hamnida"" (Korean: 더 강해진 에너지 "All스타를 지켜야 합니다")	July 25, 2025
3	3	"All Right, Here We Go"; Transliteration: "Ja ije sijagiya" (Korean: 자 이제 시작이야)	July 31, 2025
4	4	"In the Dark Times"; Transliteration: "Eoduwotdeon sigan sok" (Korean: 어두웠던 시간 속)	August 7, 2025
5	5	"You and Me, Just the Two Of Us"; Transliteration: "Neowa na duriseo" (Korean: 너와 나 둘이서)	August 14, 2025
6	6	"Burn More"; Transliteration: "Deo taolla" (Korean: 더 타올라)	August 21, 2025
7	7	"Endless Burning"; Transliteration: "Kkeudeopsi taolla" (Korean: 끝없이 타올라)	August 28, 2025
8	8	"You and I Fly High"; Transliteration: "Na neo naraolla" (Korean: 나 너 날아올라)	September 4, 2025
9	9	"Max The Power"	September 11, 2025
10	10	"Rising Up"; Transliteration: "Olla" (Korean: 올라)	September 18, 2025
11	11	"Blazing Light, Solar"; Transliteration: "Ssoa bit Solar" (Korean: 쏘아 빛 Solar)	September 25, 2025

== Discography ==
=== Singles ===
List of singles, showing year released, selected chart positions, and name of the album
Title	Year	Peak chart positions	Album
Title	Year	KOR	Album
"Hola Solar" (올라)	2025	— (Note: "Hola Solar" did not enter the Circle Digital Chart, but peaked at number 193 on the Circle Download Chart.)	Boys II Planet - Hola Solar
"Hola Solar - Planet C Version" (올라)	2025	—	Boys II Planet - Hola Solar
"Chains"	2025	171	Boys II Planet - Debut Concept Battle
"Lucky Macho"	2025	— (Note: "Lucky Macho" did not enter the Circle Digital Chart, but peaked at number 38 on the Circle Download Chart.)	Boys II Planet - Debut Concept Battle
"Main Dish"	2025	— (Note: "Main Dish" did not enter the Circle Digital Chart, but peaked at number 14 on the Circle Download Chart.)	Boys II Planet - Debut Concept Battle
"Sugar High"	2025	— (Note: "Sugar High" did not enter the Circle Digital Chart, but peaked at number 15 on the Circle Download Chart.)	Boys II Planet - Debut Concept Battle
"Brat Attitude"	2025	— (Note: "Brat Attitude" did not enter the Circle Digital Chart, but peaked at number 185 on the Circle Download Chart.)	Boys II Planet - Final Debut Battle
"Never Been 2 Heaven"	2025	— (Note: "Never Been 2 Heaven" did not enter the Circle Digital Chart, but peaked at number 157 on the Circle Download Chart.)	Boys II Planet - Final Debut Battle
"How to Fly"	2025	— (Note: "How to Fly" did not enter the Circle Digital Chart, but peaked at number 174 on the Circle Download Chart.)	Boys II Planet - Final Debut Battle
"—" denotes a recording that did not chart.

== Ratings ==
Average TV viewership ratings (Nationwide)
Ep.		Original broadcast date	Average audience share (Nielsen Korea)
1	K1	July 17, 2025	0.3% (70th)
1	C1	July 18, 2025	0.3% (88th)
2	K2	July 24, 2025	0.5% (57th)
2	C2	July 25, 2025	0.3% (80th)
3		July 31, 2025	0.6% (45th)
4		August 7, 2025	0.5% (55th)
5		August 14, 2025	0.6% (45th)
6		August 21, 2025	0.5% (48th)
7		August 28, 2025	0.5% (54th)
8		September 4, 2025	0.6% (38th)
9		September 11, 2025	0.6% (36th)
10		September 18, 2025	0.5% (55th)
11		September 25, 2025	0.8% (28th)
Average			0.5%
In the table below, the blue numbers represent the lowest ratings and the red numbers represent the highest ratings.; This show aired on a cable channel/pay TV which normally has a relatively smaller audience compared to free-to-air TV/public broadcasters (KBS, SBS, MBC and EBS).

== Aftermath ==
The final group, Alpha Drive One, will be active for 5 years after debut, and is managed by WakeOne. The group released their pre-debut single "Formula" on December 3, 2025, and debuted on January 12, 2026, with the EP Euphoria, alongside its lead single, "Freak Alarm".

Other contestants, other activities
- Some contestants returned to their original groups:
  - Yoo Kang-min (9th), Jo Gye-hyeon (37th), and Lee Dong-heon (49th) returned to Verivery.
  - Jun Lee-jeong (12th), Kim Jun-min (13th), and Muhn Won-jun (62nd) returned to WHIB.
  - Li Zihao (19th) and Jia Hanyu (91st) returned to Boy Story.
  - Han Harry June (26th) and Yang Heui-chan (57th) returned to DKB.
  - Kim Dong-yun (43rd) and Lee Hyeop (84th) returned to Drippin.
  - Bang Jun-hyuk (50th), Song Min-jae (55th), and Noh Hui-jun (77th) returned to MCND.
  - Krystian (86th) returned to Now United.
  - Chris (110th) returned to Blitzers.
  - Phoenix (113th) returned to Eastshine.
  - Thanatorn (137-160th) returned to The Wind
- Some contestants left their companies and/or joined new ones
  - Park Jun-il (21st), Jang Tae-yoon (80th) and He Jiahao (137-160th) all left iNKODE Entertainment.
    - Park Jun-il, Kim Jae-hyun (27th), who left Cube Entertainment, Xie Binghua (85th), who left RND Company, and Shin Jae-ha (112th) all joined with Macaroni Music Entertainment (MME).
    - Sun Jiayang (35th), who left JS Entertainment, and Peng Jinyu (41st) both joined iNKODE Entertainment.
  - Na Yun-seo (22nd) left Cube Entertainment.
  - Hu Hanwen (24th) joined XLABELS.
  - Yoon Min (30th) left howtouse on October 4, 2026.
  - Nian Boheng (31st), Andrew (54th), and Taichi (95th) all left Bill Entertainment.
    - Andrew joined WAYF.
  - Tatsuki (38th) and Reeonn (58th) both left WakeOne Entertainment.
    - Reeonn joined Domundi TV
  - Seo Won (39th) joined PA Entertainment.
  - Hong Zih-hao (56th), Lin Ching-en (94th), Chen Li-chi (107th) and Huang Hsin-yu (114th) all left TEN Entertainment.
    - Lin Ching-en joined OF Music.
  - Oh Junho (61st) left With US Entertainment.
  - Jiang Fan (63rd), Zheng Kun (96th), and Yuan Wei (116th) all joined WindLink Entertainment.
  - Taiga (65th) left IX Entertainment.
  - Rensho (68th) left IST Entertainment.
    - Kim Inhu (36th), who left Big Planet Made Entertainment, joined IST Entertainment.
  - Yusen (69th) left P Nation.
  - Sho (74th) left n.CH Entertainment.
  - Kim Hyeon-seo (75th) left Jellyfish Entertainment.
  - Ko Ming-chieh (76th) left IX Entertainment.
  - Chrisen Yang (78th) left RYCE Entertainment.
  - Cai Jinxin (81st) left EE-Media and joined GRID Entertainment.
  - Lim Jack (83rd) left NeedsLab Global & Culture.
  - Lee Won-woo (89th) joined ODDWAVE.
  - Chen Zishuo (112th) left I.E.One Entertainment.
  - Cho Myeong-su (137-160th) joined Just Focus Music.
  - Park Nu-ri (137-160th), who left Great M Entertainment and Kim Min-jun (137-160th) joined Modhaus.
    - Kim Min-jun seems to have later left the company.
  - Yoo Ki-won (137-160th) joined E Entertainment.
- Some contestants will debut or debuted in new boy groups, released music as solo artists, or released music under their groups:
  - Yoo Kang-min (9th), Jo Gye-hyeon (37th) and Lee Dong-heon (49th), as members of Verivery, released their fourth single album Lost and Found with the title track 'Red (Beggin')' on December 1, 2025.
    - Yoo Kang-min also debuted as a soloist with his first single album Free Falling on March 26, 2026.
  - Chuei Li-yu (10th) and Kang Woo-jin (16th) debuted as members of FNC Entertainment's new pop duo, FLARE U, with their first mini album Youth Error with the title track 'Way 2 U' on May 13, 2026.
    - Chuei Li-yu has also debuted as a soloist with the single album Sweet Dream with the title track 'UxYouxU' on December 3, 2025.
  - Jun Lee-jeong (12th), Kim Jun-min (13th), and Muhn Won-jun (62nd), as members of WHIB, released their first mini album Rock The Nation with a title track of the same name on January 29, 2026.
  - Park Dong-gyu (15th), Arctic (33rd), Kim In-hu (36th) and Kim Si-hwan (48th) debuted as members of IST Entertainment's new boy group, Tunexx with their first mini album Set By Us Only with the title track 'I'm Alive' on March 3, 2026.
  - Masato (17th), Sen (32nd), Sun Jiayang (35th) and Peng Jinyu (41st) debuted as members of one of iNKODE Entertainment's new boy groups, VAYONN with their first EP Youth Today with the title track 'Muah!' on July 6, 2026, following the release of their pre-release 'Watta Day' on June 22, 2026.
  - Jang Han-eum (18th) who already debuted as a soloist prior to the airing of the show, released his fourth digital single Omnibus with the title tracks 'Cartoon' and 'Omnibus' on October 28, 2025.
  - Park Jun-il (21st) debuted as a soloist with his first digital single Echo on April 27, 2026.
  - Hu Han-wen (24th) debuted as a soloist with his first digital single Bloom with the title track 'My Light' on July 10, 2026.
  - Han Harry June (26th) and Yang Heui-chan (57th), as members of DKB, released their ninth mini album Emotion with the title track 'Irony' on October 23, 2025.
  - Kim Jae-hyun (27th) and Shin Jae-ha (112th) are set to debut as members of Macaroni Music Entertainment's new upcoming boy group , AGD sometime in the second half of 2026.
  - He Zhongxing (29th) debuted as a soloist with his first digital single 'Piña Colada', on December 15, 2025.
  - Yoon Min (30th) who already debuted as a soloist prior to the airing of the show, released his first extended play (EP) hangertape with the title track 'Mr.feelgood' on November 23, 2025, following the pre-release digital single 'trust me!'.
  - Yeom Ye-chan (40th) and Kim Tae-jo (45th), as members of Choco1, were part of their company's mini album, ChoCo La Familia with the title tracks 'Gimme' and 'Frenzy' releasing on February 24, 2026.
  - Kim Dong-yun (43rd) and Lee Hyeop (84th) debuted as members of Drippin's first sub-unit, ChaDongHyeop with their first single album Doogeundae on May 12, 2026.
  - Bang Jun-hyuk (50th), Song Min-jae (55th), and Noh Hui-jun (77th), as members of MCND, released their seventh mini album Devil Youth Club with a title track of the same name on September 10, 2026.
  - Andrew (54th) debuted as a soloist with his first digital single 'BOYS II PLAN', as a remix of Ryan's (106th) 'BOYS PLAN', on October 28, 2025.
    - He and Lim Jack (83rd) were both featured in Ryan's (106th) music video for 'Boys Plan', released on September 25, 2025.
  - He and Ryan (106th) debuted as members of WAYF's new boy groups, WAYF BOYS with their first digital single WAYF Boys Do on August 7, 2026.
  - Jiang Fan (63rd), Zheng Kun (96th), and Yuan Wei (116th) debuted as members of WindLink Entertainment's new Chinese boy group, WINDMAX with their first digital single Best.1 on March 8, 2026, following the pre-release 'Feel The Wind' on February 10, 2026.
  - Cai Jinxin (81st) debuted as a solo artist with the digital single '123,456' on August 28, 2025.
  - Krystian (86th), who already debuted as a soloist prior to the airing of the show, released his first digital single angel-like baby on November 29, 2025.
  - Lee Won-woo (89th) debuted as a member of ODDWAVE's new boy group, Daily:Direction with their first single album First:Delivery with the title track 'ROOMBADOOMBA' on February 23, 2026.
    - Lin Ching-en (94th) is set to debut as a member of OF Music's new boy group, OVUS.
  - Ryan (106th) debuted as a soloist with his first English digital single Arojin with the title track 'AROJIN (0123)' on July 31, 2025.
  - Cho Myeong-su (137-160th) under the stage name Hamin, was set to debut as a member of JUST FOCUS Media's new boy group, GENUS, but he was put on hiatus prior to the release date. He seemingly later left the group and the company as their website didn't include him in the group's lineup anymore.
  - Park Nuri (137-160th) was revealed as Idntt's 12th member on January 1, 2026. He debuted as a member of Idntt's second sub unit, Yesw8are with the second mini album Yesweare with the title track 'Pretty Boy Swag' on January 5, 2026.
  - Qilin (137-160th) under the stage name Kylin, debuted as a member of R.O.S Entertainment's boy group, ROS 共和少年 (Gonghe Shaonian) on October 25, 2025.
  - Thanatorn (137-160th), as a member of The Wind, released their fourth mini album Second Wind: S# 00 with the title track 'Party Like A Rock Star' on July 29, 2026.
  - Yoo Ki-won (137-160th) debuted as a member of E Entertainment's new boy group, AmbiO with their first digital single Runnin' on September 27, 2025.
- Some contestants left the idol industry or further expanded their careers in the acting/entertainment industry:
  - Taichi (95th) will participate in the fourth season of the queer dating show His Man.
- Some contestants participated in other survival shows:
  - Li Zihao (19th), Sun Hengyu (20th), Hu Hanwen (24th), Fan Zheyi (25th), Xue Suren (28th), Zhao Guangxu (34th), Yi Chen (42nd), Chen Bowen (44th), Dang Hong Hai (46th), Zhang Shunyu (51st), Ko Ming-chieh (76th), Chrisen Yang (78th), Lim Jack (83rd), Xie Binghua (85th), Ngan Chau-yuet (88th), Jia Hanyu (91st), Wong Sik-hei (111th) and Chen Zishuo (112th) participated in Mnet's Planet C spin-off show Planet C: Home Race.
    - Li Zihao, Sun Hengyu, Fan Zheyi, Xue Suren, Zhao Guangxu, Yi Chen, and Ngan Chau-yuet debuted as members of the winning boy group Modyssey under Onecead, after ranking 3rd, 1st, 2nd, 5th, 4th, 6th, and 7th, respectively.
    - Hu Hanwen, Dang Hong Hai, Ko Ming-chieh, Chrisen Yang, and Lim Jack were all eliminated in the final episode, after ranking 8th, 9th, 11th, 12th, and 10th, respectively.
    - Chen Bowen, Zhang Shunyu, Xie Binghua, Jia Hanyu, Wong Sik-hei and Chen Zishuo were all eliminated in the third episode, after ranking 13th, 16th, 14th, 15th, 17th, and 18th, respectively.
  - He Zhongxing (29th) participated in Mnet's Korean rap competition TV show Show Me the Money 12. He was then eliminated in the first round of the show.
  - Taiga (65th) and Chen Li-chi (107th; as Chen Rickey) both participated in the Lemino's Japanese survival show Produce 101 Japan Shinsekai. Taiga was eliminated in the eighth episode after ranking 42nd. Chen Rickey was eliminated in the final episode after ranking 13th.
  - Lee Yoon-chan (104th) participated in Mnet's Korean band survival show STEAL HEART CLUB. He was eliminated in the final episode, after ranking 2nd in the vocal position.
