= Daily:Direction =

South Korean boy band

- Also known as: D:D
- Genre: K-pop
- Years active: 2026–present
- Label: Oddwave
- Members: En-Kim; Kim Joo-hyoung; Lim Ji-hwan; E-Van; Lee Won-woo; Jang Yoon-seok

Daily:Direction (Korean: 데일리:디렉션; RR: Deilli:direksyeon, stylized in all caps), is a South Korean boy band formed in 2026. The band consists of En-Kim, Kim Joo-hyoung, Lim Ji-hwan, E-Van, Lee Won-woo, and Jang Yoon-seok. They are the first group formed by Oddwave, an entertainment company formed by Park So-hee.

== Name ==
The group's name reflects the concept that daily choices accumulate to shape an individual's direction. Their core narrative emphasizes forging one's own path through trial, error, and choice rather than following predetermined answers.

== History ==
=== Pre-debut activities and formation ===
Prior to debuting as Daily:Direction, several members had previously belonged to pre‑debut boy bands or competed on survival reality shows for boy bands. Kim Min‑su was a member of the cancelled pre‑debut boy band Unname and competed in the show NCT Universe: Lastart, Kim Joo‑hyung performed with the boy band Nine.i and competed on Universe League, Jang Yu‑bin (later E-Van) was a member of Mirae, Lim Ji‑hwan appeared as a contestant on Be My Boyz, and Lee Won‑woo competed on Boys II Planet.

In January 2026, it was announced that Kim Min‑su, performing under the stage name En-Kim, would debut with Daily:Direction under Oddwave, a newly established entertainment company. He was named leader of the band; the remaining members were revealed sequentially via the group's SNS accounts. In early February 2026, it was announced that the group would debut later that month.

=== 2026: Debut with First:Delivery ===
On February 23, 2026, Daily:Direction debuted with the single album First:Delivery, which included the tracks "Roombadoomba", they released the music video to "Self". E‑Van and En-Kim contributed to its songwriting and production. They made their first music show performance on Mnet's M Countdown on February 26. They also announced a pop‑up event commemorating the release held at The Hyundai Seoul Heights Exchange on March 5. On March 10, 2026, they released the music video to "Self".

== Artistry ==
Their debut single "Roombadoomba" features Afrobeats influences; Kyunghyang Shinmun described the group's M Countdown performance of the track as making a strong impression, praising their high-energy execution and vivid facial expressions.

== Members ==
- En-Kim (김민수) – leader
- Kim Joo-hyoung (김주형)
- Lim Ji-hwan (임지환)
- E-Van (이반)
- Lee Won-woo (이원우)
- Jang Yoon-seok (장윤석)

== Discography ==
=== Single albums ===
List of single albums, with selected chart positions and sales figures
Title	Details	Peak chart positions	Sales
Title	Details	KOR	Sales
First:Delivery	Released: February 23, 2026; Label: Oddwave; Formats: CD, digital download	14	KOR: 15,432
Monkey Mode	Released: July 13, 2026; Label: Oddwave; Formats: CD, digital download	16	KOR: 13,214

=== Singles ===
Title	Year	Peak chart positions	Album
Title	Year	KOR Down.	Album
"Roombadoomba"	2026	119	First: Delivery
"Down With It"	2026	—	Monkey Mode
