= WHIB =

South Korean boy group

- Origin: South Korea
- Genre: K-pop
- Years active: 2023–present
- Label: C-JeS Studios
- Members: Haseung; Jinbeom; Kim Junmin; Ugeon; Leejeong; Jaeha; Wonjun
- Past members: Inhong

WHIB (Korean: 휘브) is a South Korean boy group under C-JeS Studios. The group debuted on November 8, 2023, with the single album Cut-Out. It originally consisted of eight members and has operated as a seven-member group since the departure of Inhong in 2025.

== History ==
C-JeS Studios first began revealing information on its trainee project M.I.C (Made In C-JeS) in the late portion of 2021. The group name WHIB was revealed in October 2023 and then proceeded to make their debut on November 8, 2023, with the release of a single album titled Cut-Out, which featured the song "Bang!" and the single "Dizzy". The debut marked the first boy group agency released by C-JeS Studios in 13 years.

They have since released the single albums Eternal Youth: Kick It (2024), Rush of Joy (2024), and Bang Out (2025). Their agency announced in October 2025 that Inhong had departed from WHIB. The remaining seven members of WHIB released their debut mini-album, Rock the Nation, in January 2026.

== Members ==
=== Current ===
- Haseung
- Jinbeom
- Kim Junmin (leader)
- Ugeon
- Leejeong
- Jaeha
- Wonjun

=== Former ===
- Inhong (left 2025)

== Discography ==
=== Single albums ===
- Cut-Out (2023)
- Eternal Youth: Kick It (2024)
- Rush of Joy (2024)
- Bang Out (2025)

=== Mini albums ===
- Rock the Nation (2026)
- Cherry Pie (2026)

=== Singles ===
Title	Year	Peak chart positions	Album
Title	Year	KOR Down.	Album
"Bang!"	2023	170	Cut-Out
"Dizzy"	2023	—	Cut-Out
"Kick It"	2024	—	Eternal Youth: Kick It
"Rush of Joy"	2024	121	Rush of Joy
"Bang Out"	2025	—	Bang Out
"Rock The Nation"	2026	68	Rock The Nation
"Cherry Pie"	2026	102	Cherry Pie

==== Japanese singles ====
Title	Year	Album
"First Love Never Die"	2026	Non-album single

== Filmography ==
Some of the individual group members have done limited acting on stage, however film or TV credits are not found much about the band as a group.
