= Rock the Nation =

Rock the Nation may refer to:

- "Rock the Nation", song from The Blitz
- "Rock the Nation", 1973, song from Montrose (album)
- Rock the Nations, 1986 album from Saxon
- Rock the Nation Tour, 2004 tour by Kiss
  - Rock the Nation Live! (DVD), DVD release of the tour
