= Yongsin Wongpanitnont =

Thai actor and singer (born 2002)

- ยงศิลป์ วงศ์พนิตนนท์
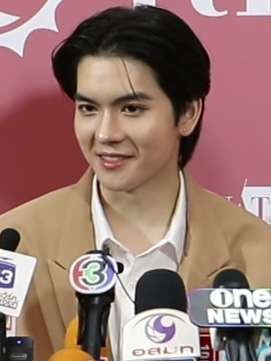
- Yongsin in July 2023
- Born: Yongsin Wongpanitnont; April 11, 2002 (age 24); Phayao, Thailand
- Other name: Yorch Yongsin
- Occupations: Actor; singer
- Years active: 2012–present
- Musical career
- Instrument: Vocals
- Years active: 2023–present
- Labels: Yorch Entertainment; Grid Entertainment
- Member of: Pow

Yongsin Wongpanitnont (Thai: ยงศิลป์ วงศ์พนิตนนท์; born April 11, 2002), nicknamed Yorch (Thai: ยอร์ช), is a Thai actor and singer. He is best known for his role as Wanchaloem in Thong Nuea Kao (2013). Yorch made his debut as a solo artist with the single "Seven" in April 2023, and debuted as a member of the South Korean boy band Pow in July that year.

== Career ==
=== 2012–2021: Acting debut and other activities ===
Yorch began his career as a child actor in 2012, at the age of 10. Since then, he has appeared in many television dramas, including Thong Nuea Kao (2013), Luead Mungkorn: Singh (2015) and Wai Sab Saraek Kad 2 (2019). He gained popularity for playing the role of Wanchaloem, in the drama Thong Nuea Kao in 2013 which also earned him a nomination for the 5th Nataraj Award for Best Supporting Actor.

In 2018, Yorch auditioned for SM Entertainment. However, he wasn't able to become a trainee due to his contract with Thai TV3.

On January 20, 2022, Yorch was revealed to be a member of Big Hit Music's boy group project Trainee A. However, the project was later disbanded and Trainee A's all social media channels ended their services on December 23, 2022.

=== 2023–present: Solo career and debut with Pow ===
Yorch made his debut as a solo artist with the single "Seven" on April 11, 2023.

On July 10, it was revealed that he would make his debut in a boy group under Grid Entertainment. On August 1, it was announced that Yorch would make his debut as a member of the boy group Pow in September 2023.

== Filmography ==
=== Film ===
Year	Title	Role	Ref.
2012	Art Idol		
2014	Timeline	Tan (young)	
2014	My House	Wan	
2017	15+ IQ Krachoot	Chaladlert	
2026	Kijsada Paradise	Ohm	

=== Television series ===
Year	Title	Role	Notes
2012	Mae Yaai Tee Rak	Wanrob / Rob (young)	
2012	Ruk Sood Plai Fah		
2012	Khun Seuk		
2013	Thong Nuea Kao	Wanchaloem Thongphoon (Wan) (age 12)	
2014	Full House	Guy (young)	
2014	Cubic	Lin Lan Ser	
2014	Pua Chua Krao		
2014	Sunshine, My Friend	Mu	
2014	Pope Rak	Yiao (young)	
2015	Luead Mungkorn: Singh	Wei	
2015	Neung Nai Suang	Anawat Patcharapojanat / Neung (young)	
2015	Kor Pen Jaosao Suk Krung Hai Cheun Jai	Poon (young)	
2015	Suphap Burud Satan	Tor (young)	
2015	Pritsana Akhat	Pom	
2015	Fai Lang Fai	Narut (young)	
2016	Philiang	Sattaya (young)	
2016	U-Prince: The Handsome Cowboy	Sibtis	
2016	Kong Krapan Naree	Dammakok (young)	
2016	Luerd Ruk Toranong	Ram	
2016	Raeng Chang	Harn	
2017	Barb Rak Ta Lay Fun	Satra	
2017	Plerng Rak Fai Marn	Wisathorn	
2018	Chuamong Tong Mon	Mark / Nasit Kittipaisalsakul	
2019	Wai Sab Saraek Kad 2	Book / Mahasmut Chumrianthong	
2019	My Love From Another Star	Mork	
2020	Sorn Ngao Ruk	Neua Mek	
2020	Watsana Rak	Kan	
2021	Praomook	Chalunthorn / Lun	
2021	Esao Untarai	Kob / Chonlathit	
2021	Oh My Sweetheart	Dont (young)	

== Discography ==
=== Singles ===
List of singles, showing year released and name of the album
Title	Year	Album
"Seven"	2023	Non-album single
"Blow Your Mind" (featuring Sik-K, Bryan Chase)	2026	Non-album single

== Awards and nominations ==
Year	Award	Category	Nominated work	Result
2014	5th Nataraj Awards	Best Supporting Actor	Thong Nuea Kao	Nominated
2014	11th Komchatluek Awards	Best Actor	Thong Nuea Kao	Won
2014	3rd Ganesha Awards	Best New Actor	Thong Nuea Kao	Won
2018	Daradaily Awards	Best Movie Star of the Year	15+ IQ Krachoot	Won
