= Euphoria (EP) =

- Digital cover

EP by Alpha Drive One
- Released: January 12, 2026
- Length: 18:56
- Languages: Korean, English
- Label: WakeOne

Alpha Drive One chronology
Euphoria (2026)	No School Tomorrow (2026)

Singles from Eupohria
- 1. "Formula" Released: December 3, 2025; 2. "Freak Alarm" Released: January 12, 2026

Euphoria is the debut extended play (EP) by South Korean boy band Alpha Drive One, a group formed through Mnet's reality competition show Boys II Planet. The EP was released on January 12, 2026, by WakeOne. It is available in eleven versions and contains six tracks with "Freak Alarm" as its lead single.

== Background and release ==
Alpha Drive One was formed through Mnet's reality competition series Boys II Planet, which aired through July 17 to September 25, 2025. The show brought 160 contestants from multiple countries to compete to debut in a multinational boy band.

On October 16, 2025, the group premiered their first YouTube original content series titled One Dream Forever, aimed at showcasing the members' personalities and teamwork prior to their musical debut. On November 11, 2025, they launched a second reality series titled ALD1ary and documented the members' first experience living together in a shared dormitory, highlighting their multicultural chemistry through language exchange between Korean and Chinese members and domestic team-building activities. Alpha Drive One made their first official public appearance on November 28 at the 2025 MAMA Awards, where they performed their pre-release single "Formula", which was released on December 3.

Alpha Drive One officially debuted on January 12, 2026, with their debut EP Euphoria along with its lead single "Freak Alarm" and music video.

== Commercial performance ==
According to WakeOne, Euphoria sold 1.44 million copies in its first week, the second-highest first-week sales for a K-pop debut album. The EP sold one million copies on its release day.

== Track listing ==
Euphoria track listing
No.	Title	Lyrics	Music	Arrangement	Length
1.	"Formula"	Kenzie	Kenzie; Jonatan Gusmark; Ludvig Evers; Adrian McKinnon	Moonshine; Kenzie	3:08
2.	"Freak Alarm"	Song U; Halfdayoff (MUMW); Cho Yu-ri (Jam Factory); Jeon Se-hee; Underscore (KOR); Deeno (KOR); Saay; Tony Ferrari	Underscore (KOR); Deeno (KOR); Saay; Tony Ferrari	Underscore (KOR)	3:08
3.	"Raw Flame"	0011Hz (ARTiffect); ChaMane; Coe (The Hub); 808Malc	808Malc; ChaMane; Coe (The Hub); Coup D'etat	Weissen; 808Malc	3:02
4.	"Chains"	Jo Yoon-kyung	Toyo; Frants; Avenue 52; Sqvare	Toyo; Frants	3:17
5.	"Never Been 2 Heaven"	Didrik Thott; Greg Curt	Ollipop; Didrik Thott; Greg Curtis; Rick "Hautboi Rich" Heymann	Ollipop	3:26
6.	"Cinnamon Shake"	Hwang Yu-bin; Jo Yoon-kyung	Konquest; Hugo Andersson; Hwaji	Konquest	2:55
Total length:					18:56

== Charts ==
=== Weekly charts ===
Weekly chart performance for Euphoria
Chart (2026)	Peak position
Hungarian Physical Albums (MAHASZ)	32
Japanese Albums (Oricon)	3
Japanese Combined Albums (Oricon)	3
Japanese Hot Albums (Billboard Japan)	9
South Korean Albums (Circle)	2

=== Monthly charts ===
Monthly chart performance for Euphoria
Chart (2026)	Position
Japanese Albums (Oricon)	4
South Korean Albums (Circle)	2

== Certifications ==
Certifications for Euphoria
Region	Certification	Certified units/sales
South Korea (KMCA)	Million	1,000,000^{^}
^{^} Shipments figures based on certification alone.

== Release history ==
Release history for Euphoria
Region	Date	Format	Label
South Korea	January 12, 2026	CD; digital download; streaming	WakeOne
Various	January 12, 2026	Digital download; streaming	WakeOne
