= Alpha Drive One =

South Korean boy band

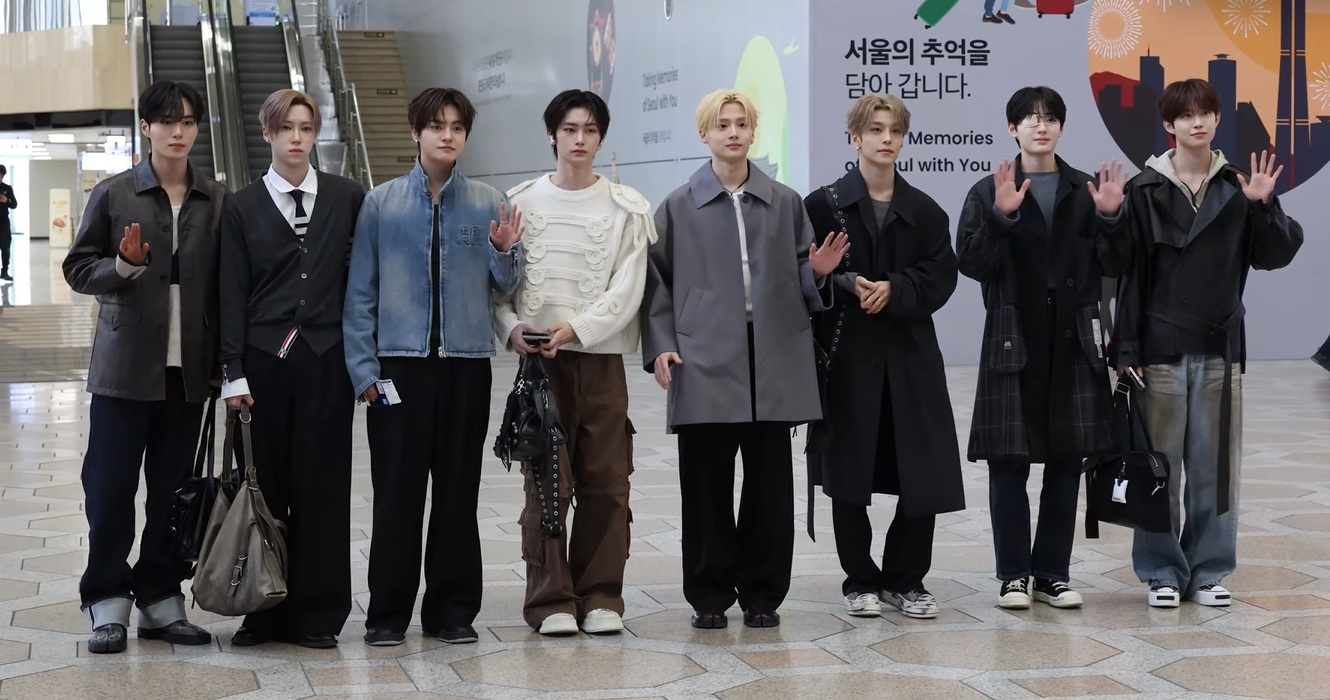
- Alpha Drive One in 2026; L–R: Junseo, Arno, Leo, Anxin, Sangwon, Xinlong, Sanghyeon, and Geonwoo

Background information
- Also known as: ALD1
- Origin: Seoul, South Korea
- Genre: K-pop
- Years active: 2026–present
- Label: WakeOne
- Members: Junseo; Arno; Leo; Geonwoo; Sangwon; Xinlong; Anxin; Sanghyeon

Alpha Drive One (Korean: 알파드라이브원; stylized in all caps; abbreviated as ALD1) is a South Korean boy band formed through Mnet's reality competition show Boys II Planet. Managed by WakeOne, the group consists of eight members: Junseo, Arno, Leo, Geonwoo, Sangwon, Xinlong, Anxin, and Sanghyeon. They debuted on January 12, 2026, with the extended play (EP) Euphoria and will promote under a five-year contract.

== Name ==
The name is intended to represent the group's ambition: Alpha for striving toward excellence, Drive for passion and momentum, and One to signify unity as one team.

== History ==
=== Pre-debut: Prior activities and formation through Boys II Planet ===
Alpha Drive One was formed through Mnet's reality competition series Boys II Planet, which aired through July 17 to September 25, 2025. During the live finale, host Kim Jae-joong announced the group name and the final lineup of eight members, which was determined through global voting across 223 countries and regions, tallying approximately 26.5 million votes. The group was reported to debut in early 2026 and promote under a five-year contract following their debut, with an additional "special activity" year to release an additional single and hold concerts.

Before appearing on the program, several members had already been active or preparing for activities in the entertainment industry. Xinlong made his debut in JYP Entertainment's Chinese boy group Boy Story on September 21, 2018. Anxin participated in the first season of the Chinese variety show Master Class in 2015 and was a child actor in the movies Bloody Destiny (2015) and Love in the Front (2017). In 2024, Arno and Anxin participated in the KBS2 reality competition show Make Mate 1, but both were eliminated in the final episode after ranking 10th and 14th, respectively. Junseo participated in the competition show Under Nineteen in 2018 and made the final lineup at 9th place. He subsequently promoted as part of the resulting group 1the9 from April 2019 until their disbandment in August 2020. Junseo debuted as a member of WEi under Oui Entertainment on October 5, 2020. In February 2025, Junseo made his acting debut in the Korean drama Secret Relationships. Leo and Sangwon were part of Big Hit Music's pre-debut group Trainee A, which promoted actively on social media platforms from 2021 to 2022, but the group ended up disbanding before their debut. After his departure from Trainee A, Leo signed with 131 Label and made his debut as a soloist on August 17, 2023.

=== 2025–present: Introduction, debut with Euphoria, "Star Road", Unbreakable: 少年Beast, and Seishun Doumei ===
Ahead of Alpha Drive One's debut, the group released their first official profile images, signaling the start of their debut promotions. They gained significant social media traction early on, surpassing one million followers on Instagram within a week of their account's launch. In September 2025, the group held a contest for fans to suggest and vote on the official fandom name, which was later revealed as 'Allyz' during an Instagram live in November. On October 16, 2025, the group premiered their first YouTube original content series titled One Dream Forever, aimed at showcasing the members' personalities and teamwork prior to their musical debut. On November 11, 2025, they launched a second reality series titled ALD1ary and documented the members' first experience living together in a shared dormitory, highlighting their multicultural chemistry through language exchange between Korean and Chinese members and domestic team-building activities. Alpha Drive One made their first official public appearance on November 28 at the 2025 MAMA Awards, where they performed their pre-release single "Formula".

On January 7, 2026, WakeOne announced that Alpha Drive One member Arno received medical advice to refrain from choreography activities for the time being, after visiting the hospital after slipping and falling on stairs while in transit. The agency stated that he will participate flexibly in promotional activities for the 1st mini album, depending on his condition, excluding performance-related schedules.

Alpha Drive One released their first EP Euphoria on January 12, alongside its lead single "Freak Alarm", following the pre-release single "Formula" on December 3, 2025. On January 21, the group won their first music show trophy on Show Champion. The group then went on to win on KBS' Music Bank, MBC's Show! Music Core and SBS' Inkigayo, becoming the first boy group in nine years to achieve first-place wins on all three terrestrial music shows with a debut track.

On March 18, WakeOne confirmed that Alpha Drive One is scheduled to release a new album in May. On March 23, WakeOne announced the start of the group's first fan concert tour "Star Road" with stops in Incheon, Yokohama, and Hong Kong in June and July.

On April 8, WakeOne announced that Geonwoo would temporarily halt all activities to "reflect on his mistakes". The agency stated that the decision was related to an incident during a pre-debut variety show recording in which Geonwoo used inappropriate language while unaware that his microphone was active. As a result, the group proceeded as a seven-member lineup for their June fan concert and subsequent promotions.

On May 26, the group pre-released the digital single "No School Tomorrow", containing the tracks "OMG!" and "Good Life", a prologue for their second EP slated for release in August. On July 25, Alpha Drive One announced their second EP Unbreakable: 少年Beast, set for release on August 24, which includes the lead single "Born Dire" and previously released tracks "OMG!" and "Good Life". The closing track "Welcome Home" marks the first time that seven members have participated in writing a song, which convey a sincere and deeply personal message to their fans.

On August 3, WakeOne announced that Alpha Drive One member Sanghyeon would be taking a break from all official schedules from August 5 through August 22, after a visit to the hospital confirmed a diagnosis of a vocal cord polyp, requiring surgery to remove. The agency stated that they would work with the medical team to support his full recovery and make sure he can return to his activities as an artist in a stable and healthy condition. Alpha Drive One will continue its activities as a six-member group during this time period.

On November 18, it was announced that the group's debut Japanese single Seishun Doumei would be released on January 27, 2026, alongside its lead single "Akatsuki".

== Members ==
=== Active ===
- Junseo (준서)
- Arno (아르노)
- Leo (리오) – leader
- Sangwon (상원)
- Xinlong (씬롱)
- Anxin (안신)
- Sanghyeon (상현)

=== Inactive ===
- Geonwoo (건우)

== Discography ==
=== Extended plays ===
List of extended plays, showing selected details, selected chart positions, sales figures, and certifications
| Title | Details | Peak chart positions | | | | | Sales | Certifications |
| Title | Details | KOR | JPN | JPN Hot | US Sales | US World | Sales | Certifications |
|---|---|---|---|---|---|---|---|---|
| Euphoria | Released: January 12, 2026; Label: WakeOne; Formats: CD, digital download, streaming | 2 | 3 | 9 | — | | KOR: 1,450,354; JPN: 59,238 | KMCA: Million |
| Unbreakable: 少年Beast | Scheduled: August 24, 2026; Label: WakeOne; Formats: CD, digital download, streaming; Track listing: 1. "Born Dire"; 2. "Diamond Hour"; 3. "One More Time"; 4. "Talk to Me"; 5. "OMG!"; 6. "Good Life"; 7. "Welcome Home" | 1 | 2 | 4 | 20 | 5 | KOR: 991,642; JPN: 81,255 | RIAJ: Gold (phy.) |
"—" denotes a recording that did not chart or was not released in that territory

=== Single albums ===
| Title | Year | Peak chart positions | Sales | Certifications | Album |
|---|---|---|---|---|---|
| "Akatsuki" (アカツキ) | 2027 | | | | 青春同盟 |
"—" denotes releases that did not chart or were not released in that region.

=== Singles ===
List of singles, showing year released, selected chart positions, and name of the album
| Title | Year | Peak chart positions | | | | Album |
| Title | Year | KOR | KOR Hot | JPN Cmb. | JPN Hot | Album |
|---|---|---|---|---|---|---|
| "Formula" | 2025 | — (Note: "Formula" did not enter the Circle Digital Chart, but appeared at number 13 on the component Download Chart.) | 56 | 39 | 36 | Euphoria |
| "Freak Alarm" | 2026 | 66 | 36 | 42 | 45 | Euphoria |
| "OMG!" | 2026 | 55 | — | 35 | 49 | Unbreakable: 少年Beast |
| "Born Dire" | 2026 | 24 | — | — | 52 | Unbreakable: 少年Beast |
"—" denotes a recording that did not chart or was not released in that territory

=== Other charted songs ===
List of other charted songs, showing year released, selected chart positions, and name of the album
| Title | Year | Peak chart positions | | Album |
| Title | Year | KOR DL | KOR Hot | Album |
|---|---|---|---|---|
| "Raw Flame" | 2026 | 11 | 59 | Euphoria |
| "Chains" | 2026 | 13 | 61 | Euphoria |
| "Never Been 2 Heaven" | 2026 | 14 | 67 | Euphoria |
| "Cinnamon Shake" | 2026 | 12 | 62 | Euphoria |
| "Diamond Hour" | 2026 | 21 | — | Unbreakable: 少年Beast |
| "One More Time" | 2026 | 24 | — | Unbreakable: 少年Beast |
| "Talk to Me" | 2026 | 23 | — | Unbreakable: 少年Beast |
| "Good Life" | 2026 | 14 | — | Unbreakable: 少年Beast |
| "Welcome Home" | 2026 | 25 | — | Unbreakable: 少年Beast |
"—" denotes a recording that did not chart or was not released in that territory

=== Soundtrack appearances ===
List of soundtracks, showing year released, selected chart positions, and name of the album
| Title | Year | Peak chart positions | Album |
| Title | Year | KOR DL | Album |
|---|---|---|---|
| "Go! Go!" | 2026 | 108 | Agent Kim Reactivated OST |

== Videography ==
=== Music videos ===
| Title | Year | Director(s) | Ref. |
|---|---|---|---|
| "Freak Alarm" | 2026 | Yunah Sheep | |
| "OMG!" | 2026 | Woogie Kim | |
| "Born Dire" | 2026 | Guzza (Kudo) | |
| "Talk to me" | 2026 | Daehee Han | |

=== Other videos ===
| Title | Year | Director(s) | Notes | Ref. |
|---|---|---|---|---|
| "Formula" | 2025 | Park Min-soo | Performance video | |
| "Born Dire" | 2026 | Guzza (Kudo) | Performance video | |

== Filmography ==
=== Television shows ===
| Year | Title | Notes | Ref. |
|---|---|---|---|
| 2025 | Boys II Planet | Reality competition show determining Alpha Drive One's members | |

=== Web shows ===
| Year | Title | Notes | Ref. |
|---|---|---|---|
| 2025–present | One Dream Forever | Reality show | |
| 2025 | ALD1ary | Pre-debut reality show | |
| 2025 | Alpha Drive One, Let's Go | Pre-debut reality show | |
| 2026 | OMG! HOUSE | Reality show for the single "OMG!" | |
| 2026 | WHO IS THE BEAST? | Reality show for their second EP Unbreakable: 少年Beast | |

== Live performances ==
=== Concerts and tours ===
| Date | City | Country | Venue | Performed song(s) | Ref. |
2026 Alpha Drive One Fan-Con Tour [Star Road]
| June 12, 2026 | Incheon | South Korea | Inspire Arena | "Never Been 2 Heaven"; "Cinnamon Shake"; "Chains"; "OMG!"; "Raw Flame"; "Freak Alarm"; "Formula"; "Good Life"; "Welcome Home" | |
| June 13, 2026 | Incheon | South Korea | Inspire Arena | "Never Been 2 Heaven"; "Cinnamon Shake"; "Chains"; "OMG!"; "Raw Flame"; "Freak Alarm"; "Formula"; "Good Life"; "Welcome Home" | |
| June 14, 2026 | Incheon | South Korea | Inspire Arena | "Never Been 2 Heaven"; "Cinnamon Shake"; "Chains"; "OMG!"; "Raw Flame"; "Freak Alarm"; "Formula"; "Good Life"; "Welcome Home" | |
| June 26, 2026 | Yokohama | Japan | Pia Arena MM | "Never Been 2 Heaven"; "Cinnamon Shake"; "Chains"; "OMG!"; "Raw Flame"; "Freak Alarm"; "Formula"; "Good Life"; "Welcome Home" | |
| June 27, 2026 | Yokohama | Japan | Pia Arena MM | "Never Been 2 Heaven"; "Cinnamon Shake"; "Chains"; "OMG!"; "Raw Flame"; "Freak Alarm"; "Formula"; "Good Life"; "Welcome Home" | |
| June 28, 2026 | Yokohama | Japan | Pia Arena MM | "Never Been 2 Heaven"; "Cinnamon Shake"; "Chains"; "OMG!"; "Raw Flame"; "Freak Alarm"; "Formula"; "Good Life"; "Welcome Home" | |
| July 11, 2026 | Hong Kong | | AsiaWorld-Arena | "Never Been 2 Heaven"; "Cinnamon Shake"; "Chains"; "OMG!"; "Raw Flame"; "Freak Alarm"; "Formula"; "Good Life"; "Welcome Home" | |

=== Music festivals ===
| Event | Date | Location (Note: Venue, City, Country) | Performed song(s) | Ref. |
|---|---|---|---|---|
| MyNavi Presents The Performance | April 12, 2026 | K-Arena Yokohama, Yokohama, Japan | "Formula"; "Chains"; "Cinnamon Shake"; "Freak Alarm" | |
| KCON Japan 2026 | May 8–9, 2026 | Makuhari Messe, Chiba, Japan | "Formula"; "Chains"; "Beautiful" (Wanna One cover); "Freak Alarm"; "Cinnamon Shake"; "Hola Solar" | |
| M Countdown X Mega Concert 2026 | May 30, 2026 | Inspire Arena, Incheon, South Korea | "OMG!"; "Freak Alarm" | |
| Caribbean Bay Water Music Pool Party 2026 | July 18, 2026 | Caribbean Bay, Yongin, South Korea | "OMG!"; "Freak Alarm"; "Formula" | |
| Waterbomb Seoul 2026 | July 24, 2026 | KINTEX Outdoor Stage, Goyang, South Korea | "OMG!"; "Freak Alarm"; "Cinnamon Shake"; "Raw Flame"; "Bang Bang Bang" (Bigbang cover); "Good Life" | |
| 2026 SBS Gayo Daejeon Summer | August 9, 2026 | KINTEX, Goyang, South Korea | "Red Flavor" (Red Velvet cover); "Dance The Night Away" (Twice cover, with KickFlip and And2ble); "Freak Alarm" | |
| KCON LA 2026 | August 16, 2026 | Crypto.com Arena, Los Angeles, United States | "OMG!"; "Good Life"; "Cinnamon Shake"; "Freak Alarm"; "Never Been 2 Heaven"; "Formula"; "Raw Flame"; "Fake Love" (BTS cover) | |
| Music Bank in Barcelona 2026 | September 12, 2026 | Estadi Olímpic Lluís Companys, Barcelona, Spain | "Born Dire"; "Raw Flame"; "Good Life"; "Freak Alarm"; "Armageddon" (Aespa cover) | |
| Inkigayo Live in Tokyo 2026 | September 23, 2026 | Belluna Dome, Saitama, Japan | "Born Dire"; "Raw Flame" | |
| NOL Festival 2026 | October 18, 2026 | KINTEX, Goyang, South Korea | "Formula"; "Chains"; "Born Dire"; "Raw Flame" | |
| Music Bank Global Festival 2026 | December 12, 2026 | Japan National Stadium, Tokyo, Japan | TBA | |
| SBS Gayo Daejeon 30th Anniversary | December 25, 2026 | KINTEX, Goyang, South Korea | TBA | |

=== Awards shows ===
| Event | Date | Location | Performed song(s) | Ref. |
|---|---|---|---|---|
| 2025 MAMA Awards | November 28, 2025 | Kai Tak Stadium, Hong Kong, China | "Intro"; "Formula" | |
| 2025 Melon Music Awards | December 20, 2025 | Gocheok Sky Dome, Seoul, South Korea | "Hola Solar" (MMA ver.); "Formula" | |
| Asia Star Entertainer Awards 2026 | May 17, 2026 | Belluna Dome, Saitama, Japan | "Formula"; "Freak Alarm" | |
| 35th Seoul Music Awards | June 20, 2026 | Inspire Arena, Incheon, South Korea | "Intro"; "Freak Alarm"; "OMG!" | |
| KM Chart Awards 2026 | July 25, 2026 | Korea University, Seoul, South Korea | "Intro"; "Freak Alarm"; "Formula"; "OMG!" | |
| TMElive International Music Awards 2026 | August 22, 2026 | Kai Tak Stadium, Hong Kong, China | "Formula"; "Freak Alarm"; "Chains"; "OMG!" | |
| 2026 K-World Dream Awards | August 27, 2026 | KINTEX, Goyang, South Korea | "Born Dire" | |
| 2026 SPOTV K-Pop Awards | September 6, 2026 | KINTEX, Goyang, South Korea | "Born Dire" + "Dance Break + "Freak Alarm" | |
| The Fact Music Awards 2026 | September 19, 2026 | Busan Asiad Main Stadium, Busan, South Korea | "Freak Alarm"; "Born Dire" | |
| 2026 Korea Grand Music Awards | November 8, 2026 | Gocheok Sky Dome, Seoul, South Korea | "Freak Alarm"; "Born Dire" | |
| 2026 Melon Music Awards | November 15, 2026 | Gocheok Sky Dome, Seoul, South Korea | "Freak Alarm" (MMA ver.); "Born Dire" (MMA ver.) | |
| 2026 MAMA Awards | November 20, 2026 | Kyocera Dome, Osaka, Japan | "Intro"; "Diamond Hour"; "Raw Flame"; "Born Dire" | |
| 11th Asia Artist Awards | December 6, 2026 | Kaohsiung National Stadium, Kaohsiung, Taiwan | TBA | |

== Awards and nominations ==
Name of the award ceremony, year presented, category, nominee of the award, and the result of the nomination
| Award ceremony | Year | Category | Nominee / Work | Result | Ref. |
|---|---|---|---|---|---|
| Asia Star Entertainer Awards | 2026 | The Platinum (Bonsang) | Alpha Drive One | Won | |
| Asia Star Entertainer Awards | 2026 | Best New Artist – Singer | Alpha Drive One | Won | |
| Brand Customer Loyalty Awards | 2026 | Male Idol (Newcomer) | Alpha Drive One | Nominated | |
| D Awards | 2026 | Best Rising Star (Boy) | Alpha Drive One | Nominated | |
| 2nd iMBC Awards | 2026 | Best Rookie Singer | Alpha Drive One | Won | |
| K-World Dream Awards | 2026 | K-World Dream Artist Award | Alpha Drive One | Won | |
| K-World Dream Awards | 2026 | K-Dream Super Rookie Award | Alpha Drive One | Won | |
| KM Chart Awards | 2026 | Ultimate 12 (Bonsang) | Alpha Drive One | Won | |
| KM Chart Awards | 2026 | New Artist Award | Alpha Drive One | Won | |
| KM Chart Awards | 2026 | Global Rising Star Award | Alpha Drive One | Nominated | |
| Korea Grand Music Awards | 2026 | Artist of January - Rookie Category | Alpha Drive One | Won | |
| Korea Grand Music Awards | 2026 | Best Music (Bonsang) | Alpha Drive One | Won | |
| Korea Grand Music Awards | 2026 | IS Rising Star | Alpha Drive One | Won | |
| MAMA Awards | 2026 | Best New Artist | Alpha Drive One | Won | |
| Melon Music Awards | 2026 | New Artist of the Year | Alpha Drive One | Won | |
| Seoul Music Awards | 2026 | Main Award (Bonsang) | Alpha Drive One | Won | |
| Seoul Music Awards | 2026 | Rookie of the Year | Alpha Drive One | Won | |
| SPOTV K-pop Awards | 2026 | Artist of the Year (Bonsang) | Alpha Drive One | Won | |
| SPOTV K-pop Awards | 2026 | Best New Artist | Alpha Drive One | Won | |
| The Fact Music Awards | 2026 | Artist of the Year (Bonsang) | Alpha Drive One | Won | |
| The Fact Music Awards | 2026 | Next Leader | Alpha Drive One | Won | |
| TMElive International Music Awards | 2026 | The Hottest New International Group | Alpha Drive One | Won | |
| Visionary Awards (Note: Visionary Awards, which started in 2020, selects and awards people who lead roles in the Korean entertainment industry. It highlights the meaning and achievements of a person whose chosen trend keywords penetrated the entertainment industry, including broadcasting, movies, music, and performances, and presents the next vision of the cultural sector with outstanding achievements and influence.) | 2026 | 2026 Visionary | Alpha Drive One | Won | |
