= The Wind (band) =

South Korean boy group

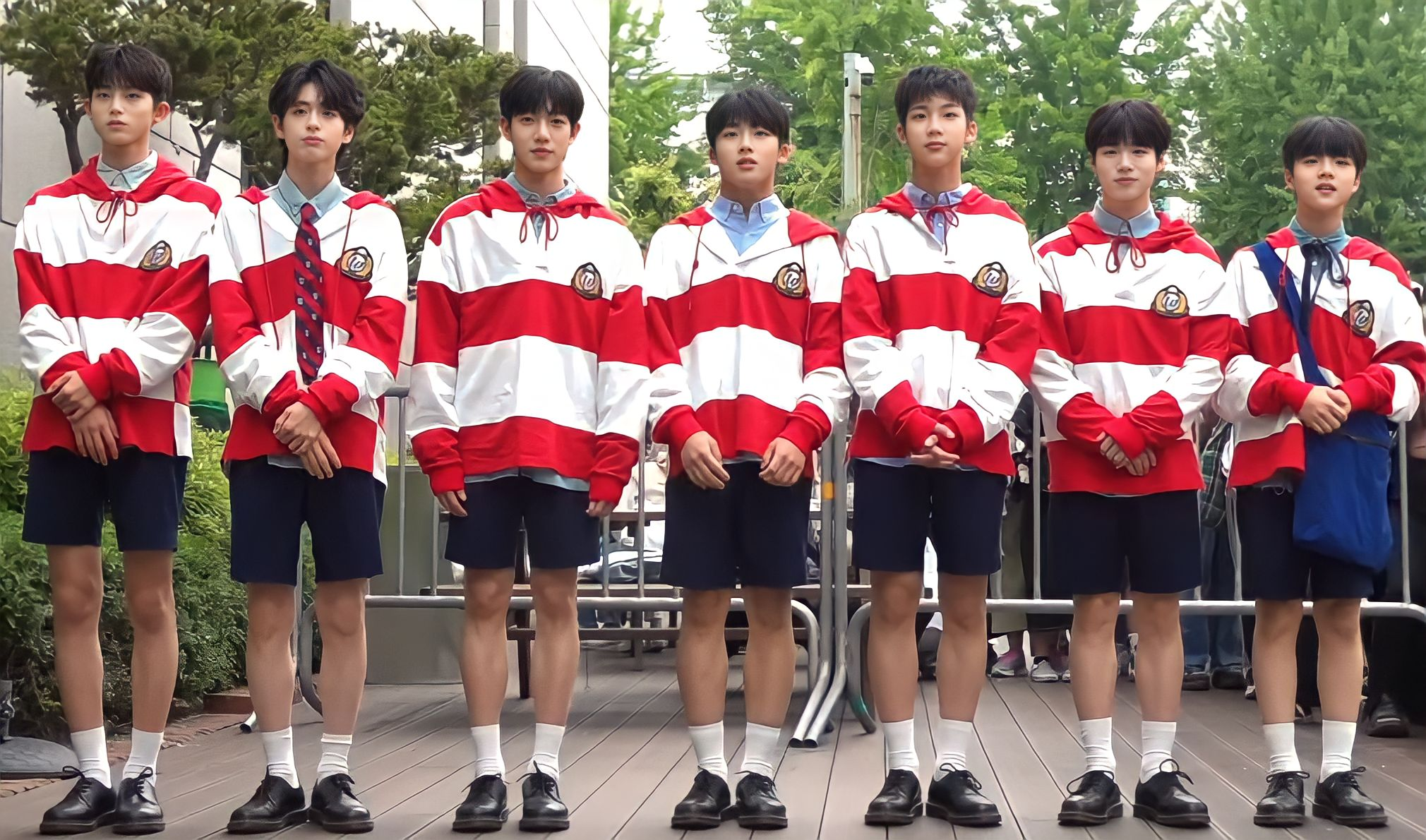
- The Wind in June 2023; L–R: Hanbin, Hyounjoon, Thanatorn, Jaewon, Hayuchan, Heesoo, Chanwon

Background information
- Origin: South Korea
- Genre: K-pop
- Years active: 2023–present
- Labels: PPangStar; With Us; Around Us
- Members: Kim Heesoo; Thanatorn; Choi Hanbin; Park Hayuchan; An Chanwon; Jang Hyounjoon
- Past members: Shin Jaewon
- Website: withusent.com/ko/?c=194

The Wind (Korean: 더윈드) is a South Korean boy group formed and managed by With Us Entertainment. The group consists of six members: Kim Heesoo, Thanatorn, Choi Hanbin, Park Hayuchan, An Chanwon, and Jang Hyounjoon. They debuted on May 15, 2023, with the extended play (EP) Beginning: The Wind Page.

== History ==
=== 2023: Introduction, debut, and Shin Jae-won's departure ===
On March 15, With Us Entertainment announced that it would be debuting its first boy group, The Wind. The members were revealed from March 16 to 22 (in order: Jang Hyounjoon, Thanatorn, Kim Heesoo, Park Hayuchan, Shin Jaewon, Choi Hanbin, and An Chanwon). A music video for the song "Sirius" was released on April 24. On May 15, the group made their debut with the release of the extended play Beginning: The Wind Page and the single "Island".

On June 7, the music video for 'Summer Vacation' was released, ahead of the release of the single album Ready : Summer Vacation, along with the single "We Go", on August 2.

On December 6, With Us announced that member Shin Jaewon had departed from the group for personal reasons and The Wind would continue as a six-piece ensemble.

=== 2024–2025: An Chan-won's and Thanatorn's hiatus and subsequent releases ===
On January 23, 2024, it was announced that member An Chan-won would take a temporary break from activities with the group due to health issues, and would not take part in promotions for the group's upcoming EP. The group released their second EP Our: Youthteen on February 14, along with the single "H! Teen". An Chanwon returned from his hiatus on May 5.

Between May 10 and 12, 2024, The Wind participated in KCON Japan's main show, marking its first entry with Japanese fans.

The single "Sirius Part. 2" was released on May 15, 2024, to celebrate the group's one-year anniversary.

On October 7, 2024, The Wind released their third EP Hello: My First Love and its lead single of the same name. The group took their first music show win through this release on October 18 on Music Bank.

On March 17, 2025, The Wind released their second single album Only One Story along with the single "Only One."

On May 7, 2025, it was announced that member Thanatorn would take a temporary break from activities with the group due to personal reasons.

The single "Hello Tomorrow" was released on May 15, 2025, to celebrate the group's two-year anniversary.

=== 2026–Present: New management and subsequent releases under PPangStar entertainment and Kim Hee-soo's Hiatus ===
On April 22, 2026, With Us Entertainment entered a partnership with PPangStar Entertainment. PPangStar Entertainment will be managing The Wind's group activities driven by a shift in direction and the goal of global expansion.

On May 6, 2026, it was announced that member Kim Hee-Soo would be taking a break from group activities due to anxiety related symptoms.

On July 29, 2026, The Wind released their 4th EP Second Wind : S# 00 and its lead single 'Party Like A Rock Star'. The album was produced by Block B's Park Kyung.

== Members ==
Current

- Kim Hee-soo (김희수)
- Thanatorn (타나톤)
- Choi Han-bin (최한빈)
- Park Hayu-chan (박하유찬)
- An Chan-won (안찬원)
- Jang Hyoun-joon (장현준)

Former

- Shin Jaewon (신재원) (2023)

== Discography ==
=== Extended plays ===
List of extended plays, showing selected details, selected chart positions, and sales figures
Title	Details	Peak chart positions	Sales
Title	Details	KOR	Sales
Beginning: The Wind Page	Released: May 15, 2023; Label: With Us Entertainment; Formats: CD, digital download, streaming	34	KOR: 14,225
Our: Youthteen	Released: February 14, 2024; Label: With Us Entertainment; Formats: CD, digital download, streaming	13	KOR: 13,968
Hello: My First Love	Released: October 7, 2024; Label: With Us Entertainment; Formats: CD, digital download, streaming	14	KOR: 16,015
Second Wind : S# 00	Released: July 29, 2026; Label: PpangStar Entertainment; Formats: CD, digital download, streaming	22	KOR: TBA

=== Single albums ===
List of single albums, showing selected details, selected chart positions, and sales figures
Title	Details	Peak chart positions	Sales
Title	Details	KOR	Sales
Ready: Summer Vacation	Released: August 2, 2023; Label: With Us Entertainment; Formats: CD, digital download, streaming	43	KOR: 14,311
Only One Story	Released: March 17, 2025; Label: With Us Entertainment; Formats: CD, digital download, streaming	17	KOR: 21,170

=== Singles ===
List of singles, showing year released, selected chart positions, and name of the album
Title	Year	Peak chart positions	Album
Title	Year	KOR Down.	Album
"Island"	2023	148	Beginning: The Wind Page
"Summer Vacation" (여름방학)	2023	—	Ready: Summer Vacation
"We Go"	2023	172	Ready: Summer Vacation
"H! Teen"	2024	96	Our: Youthteen
"Sirius Part. 2" (빛을 담아 너에게 줄게 Part. 2)	2024	—	Non-album single
"Hello, My First Love" (반가워, 나의첫사랑)	2024	21	Hello: My First Love
"Only One"	2025	38	Only One Story
"Hello Tomorrow" (안녕 내일)	2025	199	Non-album single
"Party Like A Rock Star"	2026	—	Second Wind: S#00
"—" denotes a recording that did not chart or was not released in that territory.

=== Other charted songs ===
List of songs, showing year released, selected chart positions, and name of the album
Title	Year	Peak chart positions	Album
Title	Year	KOR Down.	Album
"Heart Fluttering" (설레는 마음으로)	2024	176	Our: Youthteen
"Friendship" (우정	2024	186	Our: Youthteen
"Happy B Day"	2024	188	Our: Youthteen
"Whoo" (민들레)	2024	198	Hello: My First Love
"I Don't Thing" (친구 사인 아닌 것 같아)	2024	189	Hello: My First Love
"Good Morning"	2024	194	Hello: My First Love

== Videography ==
=== Music videos ===
Song title	Year	Ref.
"Sirius"	2023	
"Island"	2023	
"Summer Vacation"	2023	
"We Go"	2023	
"H! Teen"	2024	
"Sirius Part. 2"	2024	
"Hello, My First Love"	2024	
"Only One"	2025	
"Hello Tomorrow"	2025	
"Party Like A Rockstar"	2026	
