= Boy Story =

Chinese boy band

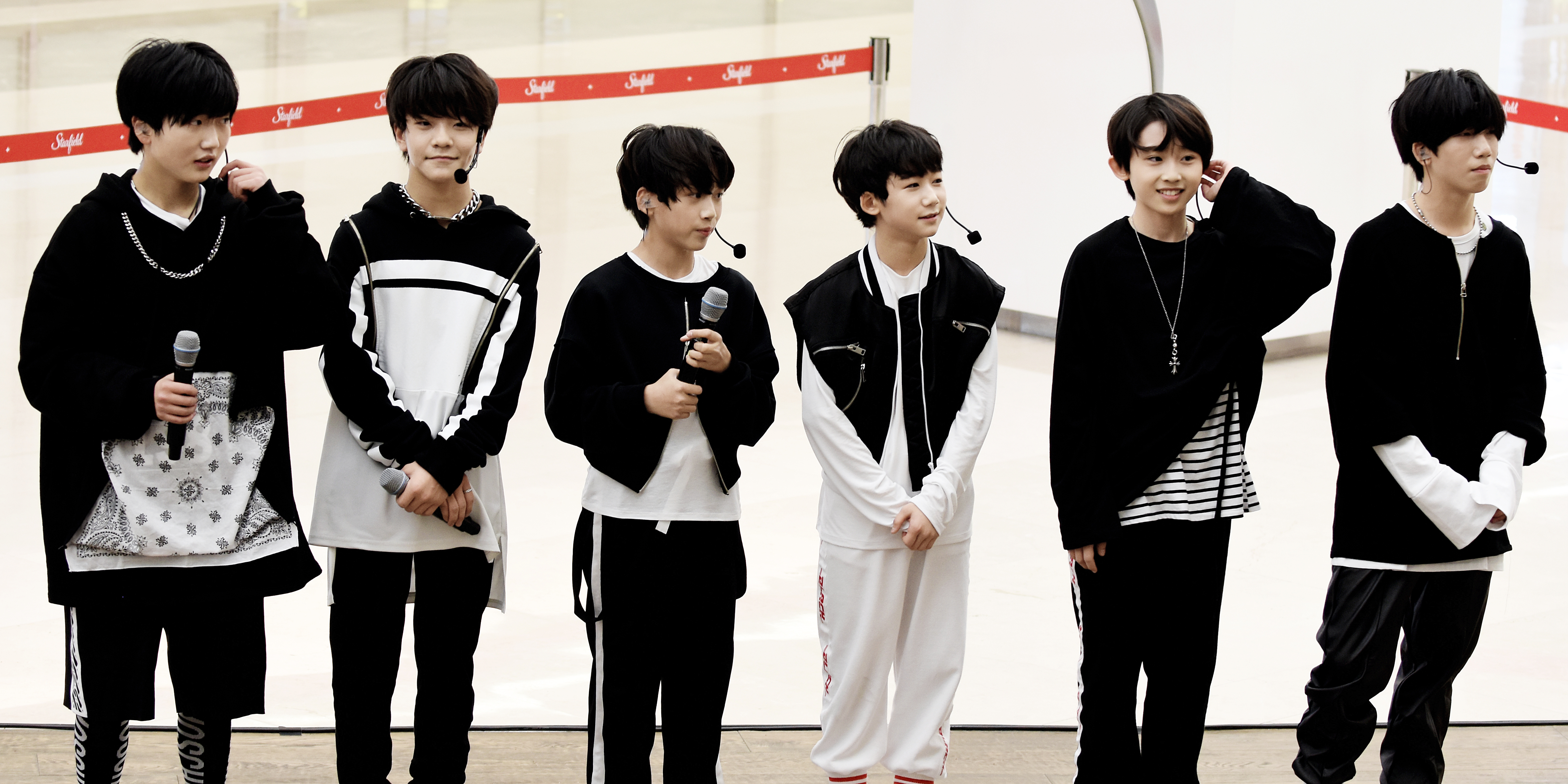
- Boy Story busking at Starfield COEX Mall, April 2019; L–R: Hanyu, Xinlong, Mingrui, Shuyang, Zeyu, and Zihao

Background information
- Origin: Beijing, China
- Genres: C-pop; hip hop; electronica
- Years active: 2017–present
- Labels: JYP; Tencent; NCC
- Members: Jia Hanyu; Li Zihao; He Xinlong; Yu Zeyu; Gou Mingrui; Ren Shuyang
- Website: boystory.jype.com

Chinese name
- Chinese: 男孩的故事
Transcriptions
Standard Mandarin
- Hanyu Pinyin: Nánhái de Gùshì

Boy Story (Chinese: 男孩的故事; pinyin: Nánhái de Gùshì; stylized in all caps) is a Chinese boy band launched by JYP Entertainment and Tencent Music Entertainment Group (TME). The group is composed of six members: Hanyu, Zihao, Xinlong, Zeyu, Mingrui, and Shuyang. On September 21, 2018, Boy Story made an official debut with their first mini album Enough.

== History ==
=== Pre-debut project ===
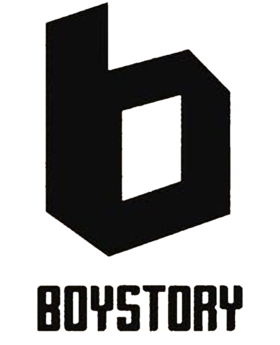
Boy Story's official logo

Under the JYP Entertainment vision "K-pop 3.0" or "Globalization by Localization", the label announced its plans to produce localized acts aiming at both the Chinese and Japanese markets in early 2018. Boy Story was the first group formed under this strategy, with the group's six members joining the company in 2016 after being selected by JYPE founder J. Y. Park.

Since September 2017, the "Real Project" pre-debut series was launched with four singles in order to make way for the group's official debut in September 2018. The first release under their pre-debut series was "How Old R U", which was released on September 8, 2017. The second single was "Can't Stop" that was released on December 15, 2017.

In the middle of their "Real Project" pre-debut series, Boy Story made an appearance on the 2018 'Lantern Festival Joy Party (Yuan Xiao Xi Le Hui / 元宵喜乐会)', a special program of channel Hunan Satellite TV that airs annually in celebration of China's Lantern Festival. The group performed their songs "How Old R U" and "Can't Stop" at the event. The group's third single for their pre-debut project was "Jump Up" which was released on March 30, 2018. To conclude the pre-debut project, the song "Handz Up", produced by J.Y. Park himself, was released on June 12, 2018.

=== 2018–2019: Debut with Enough, "Oh My Gosh", and "Too Busy" ===
Boy Story made their official debut on September 21, 2018, with their first mini album Enough that included all the pre-debut singles and the debut song "Enough". On October 21, 2018, the group released "Stay Magical" (奇妙里). The following month, Boy Story released the song "For U" on November 22, 2018.

Boy Story released "Oh My Gosh" on March 29, 2019, followed by another comeback on July 26, with "Too Busy" featuring Jackson Wang. On September 29, Boy Story performed on the first day of KCON 2019 held at the Impact Arena in Bangkok, Thailand.

=== 2020–2022: I=U=WE series ===
On January 6, 2020, Boy Story released their second extended play I=U=WE: Prologue as the prologue to their "I=U=WE" trilogy series. The members were involved in writing the lyrics and composing the music for the album, which thematically tells about the joys, sorrows and inner changes in growing up and announcing the group's transformation from being boys to being teenagers. On May 6, the group held their first online concert titled "Stage: On Air" in collaboration with the short-video mobile platform Tencent Weish. With the theme "The Confession of Youth", the concert recorded over 810,000 concurrent viewers. It was then announced that two more dates for "Stage: On Air" will be held within the year. The concert was sponsored by the Korea Agro-Fisheries & Food Trade Corporation and is evaluated to have "opened a new chapter for the Korea-China exchange relationship in the untact time." On July 4, Boy Story held the second date of their "Stage: On Air" online concert, amassing over 3,380,000 viewers in real-time, a 320% increase compared to the recorded audience from the concert in May. Boy Story was invited to perform at the Bilibili World Shanghai Station, an online entertainment festival held by video-sharing website company Bilibili, on August 7. The event was reported to have a viewership of over one million people. On September 1, Boy Story held the third and final date of their "Stage: On Air" online concert, recording over 1.35 million concurrent viewers. The cumulative total number of viewers for all three live broadcasts held by the group reached 5 million. In line with their second anniversary, the group held an online fan event titled "FLY 2 U" on September 20. The event garnered over 560,000 concurrent viewers, setting a record at QQ Music. On October 28, Boy Story released the song "Wai" as part of the official soundtrack for the Chinese web drama Airbenders. "Wai" topped the Asian New Songs Chart on the day of release. Boy Story released their third EP I=U=WE: I on November 27, the first part of their "I=U=WE" trilogy series. The album thematically shows the various conflicts of adolescence such as developing one's own opinions and ideas and feeling both rebellious and insecure.

On September 14, 2021, Boy Story released the second part of their "I=U=WE" trilogy series, the single album I=U=WE: U, with lead single "Be Urself".

On September 3, 2022, Boy Story released the third part of their "I=U=WE" trilogy series and their first full album, "WE". The lead single "WW" was #3 on Billboard's Hot Trending Songs chart, a first for a Chinese boy band. On December 23, Boy Story released the single "For Us".

=== 2023–2024: Z.I.P, JI, and UP ===
On January 1, 2023, Boy Story released the single "Friends" (友友). On January 18, Boy Story attended the 2022 Weibo Music Awards, where they received the "Rising Group of the Year Award". On April 28, Boy Story released the single "What's Poppin". On July 28, Boy Story released their second EP, Z.I.P, with the lead single "Z.I.P (Zero is the only Passion), which they promoted with two special performances of its English verson on South Korean music shows for the first time. On August 12, Boy Story kicked off their "Z.I.P" Showcase Tour, which continued until October 5. On December 2, Boy Story participated in recording "Lasting Legacy", the official anthem of the 2023 United Nations Climate Change Conference, which they performed at the conference alongside other artists.

On February 3, 2024, Boy Story released their third EP, JI, which all six members participated in writing. The lead single, "Alpha", is about "the contradiction of opposites". On the same day, Boy Story kicked off their "JI" Showcase Tour with a concert in Shanghai and a concert in Guangzhou the next day. On March 3, Boy Story released a single album containing the Korean version of "Alpha", which they promoted on South Korean music shows. On May 31, they released the single "Gummy Candy Love" in collaboration with Malaysian singer Gaston Pong. On July 12, Boy Story released their fourth EP UP with lead single "Pump !t Up". On July 13, Boy Story kicked off their "Level-Up!" Fan-Live Tour, which continued until August 24. On August 12, Boy Story released the Korean version of "Pump !t Up", which they promoted for a week on South Korean music shows. In September, Boy Story received the "Breakout Group of the Year Award" at the 2024 Weibo Music Awards. On October 17, Boy Story released "Yours & Mine" in collaboration with Crazy Donkey and Chuanzi (川子唢呐).

=== 2025–present: Boys II Planet and group hiatus ===
In July 2025, members Hanyu, Zihao, and Xinlong participated in the Mnet reality competition program Boys II Planet, which aimed to create a new South Korean boy group. Hanyu was eliminated in the second episode, while Zihao was eliminated in the semi finals. Xinlong ranked third in the finale on September 25 and made it into the final group, Alpha Drive One, which debuted in January 2026. Hanyu and Zihao went on to compete on the Boys II Planet spin-off Planet C: Home Race in December 2025. Hanyu was eliminated in the first round, while Zihao ranked third in the finale on December 27 and made it into the final group, Modyssey.

== Members ==
- Jia Hanyu (贾涵予)
- Li Zihao (李梓豪)
- He Xinlong (贺鑫隆)
- Yu Zeyu (于泽宇)
- Gou Mingrui (苟明睿)
- Ren Shuyang (任书漾)

== Discography ==
=== Extended plays ===
Title	Album details
Enough	Released: September 21, 2018; Label: NCC Entertainment; Format: CD, Digital download
I=U=WE : 序	Released: January 6, 2020; Label: NCC Entertainment; Format: CD, Digital download
I=U=WE: 我	Released: November 27, 2020; Label: NCC Entertainment; Format: CD, Digital download
UP	Released: July 12, 2024; Label: NCC Entertainment; Format: CD, Digital download

=== Single albums ===
Title	Details	Peak positions
Title	Details	KOR
Alpha (極)	Released: March 4, 2024; Label: NCC Entertainment; Formats: CD, Digital download	67

=== Singles ===
Title	Year	Peak position	Album
Title	Year	CHN	Album
"How Old R U"	2017	8	Enough
"Can't Stop"	2017	7	Enough
"Jump Up"	2018	2	Enough
"Handz Up"	2018	30	Enough
"Enough"	2018	8	Enough
"奇妙里 (Qí Miào Lǐ) – Stay Magical"	2018	—	Non-album singles
"For U"	2018	15	Non-album singles
"Oh My Gosh"	2019	—	Non-album singles
"Too Busy"	2019	—	Too Busy
"Intro: Boy Story"	2020	—	I=U=WE: 序(Prologue)
"如果 (If..)"	2020	—	I=U=WE: 序(Prologue)
"Energy"	2020	—	I=U=WE: 序(Prologue)
"序；告白 (Only U) "	2020	—	I=U=WE: 序(Prologue)
"Outro: 彼此(Believe Us)"	2020	—	I=U=WE: 序(Prologue)
"Change"	2020	—	Non-album singles
"Wai"	2020	—	Non-album singles (Note: Airbenders OST)
"Bitter Sweet"	2021	—	I=U=WE：I
"ID"	2021	—	I=U=WE：I
"Cooking For Ya"	2021	—	Non-album singles
"Monster"	2021	—	I=U=WE : U
"Be Urself"	2021	—	I=U=WE : U
"WW"	2022	—	We
"What's Poppin'"	2023	—	What's Poppin'
"Intro： SET OUT"	2023	—	Z.I.P
"Z.I.P (Zero Is The Only Passion)"	2023	—	Z.I.P
"ON THE WAY"	2023	—	Z.I.P
"Alpha"	2024	—	JI
"Cypher: Overheat"	2024	—	JI
"Lost"	2024	—	JI
"Please"	2024	—	JI
"Alpha (English Version)"	2024	—	JI
"Pump It Up"	2024	—	Up

== Awards and nominations ==
Year	Ceremony	Award	Nominated Work	Result	Ref.
2017	Asia Music Festival	Best Hip-Hop	Boy Story	Nominated	
2018	2018 FEIA Awards	Popular Act	Boy Story	Won	
2019	2019 FEIA Awards	Most Anticipating Act	Boy Story	Nominated	
2019	TMEA 2019	QQ Music New Power	Boy Story	Won	

=== Music Shows ===
Year	Date	Producer	TV show name	Nominated work	Results
2018	November 18	TME Tencent Music Entertainment Group	YO! BANG	Enough	Won
2018	December 2	TME Tencent Music Entertainment Group	YO! BANG	For U	Nominated

== Videography ==
=== Music Videos ===
Year	Title
2017	"How Old R U"
2017	"Can't Stop"
2018	"JUMP UP"
2018	"Handz Up"
2018	"Enough"
2018	"奇妙里(Qí Miào Lǐ) – Stay Magical"
2018	"For U"
2019	"Oh My Gosh"
2019	"Too Busy"
