= Wishpool (EP) =

- Digital cover

EP by B.D.U
- Released: June 26, 2024
- Studio: Dogg Bounce; W Sound
- Length: 16:31
- Language: Korean
- Label: Orca; Genie
- Producer: Pdogg

Singles from Wishpool
- 1. "My One" Released: June 26, 2024

Wishpool is the debut extended play by South Korean boy group B.D.U. It was released on June 26, 2024, through Orca Music and Genie Music. The EP contains five tracks with the single "My One".

== Background ==
B.D.U was formed through Build Up: Vocal Boy Group Survival, a reality competition show which aired from January 26, to March 29, 2024. Member Jay Chang who selected Bitsaeon, Seunghun, and Kim Min-seo, formed HunMinJayBit from episode 7 until the finale and eventually won the show which broadcast live on March 29, and would debut under the project group's name B.D.U (abbreviation for Boys Define Universe). They would also carry out various activities such as releasing music and albums for two years, as well as domestic and global tours.

In a recent interviews with various media companies from April to May 2024, the quartet announced that they were already in full-scale preparing for their debut and member Seunghun said that they also aimed to release the two album within this year.

On June 10, 2024, Orca Music announced that B.D.U is set to release their debut EP Wishpool on June 26.

== Release and promotion ==
On June 12, 2024, Orca released the scheduler poster of B.D.U on the group's social media accounts. On June 14, the tracklist was released with a total of five tracks including the lead single "My One" and an English version of it. "My One" was produced by Pdogg who is the exclusive producer of Big Hit Music and the creator of many hit songs by BTS. Concept Photos 1–5 were released from June 17–21, along with the album details and pre-order period. On June 22, B.D.U released the highlight medley of all the tracks from the EP. Teasers for "My One" were released on June 24 and 25, showing short parts of the music video.

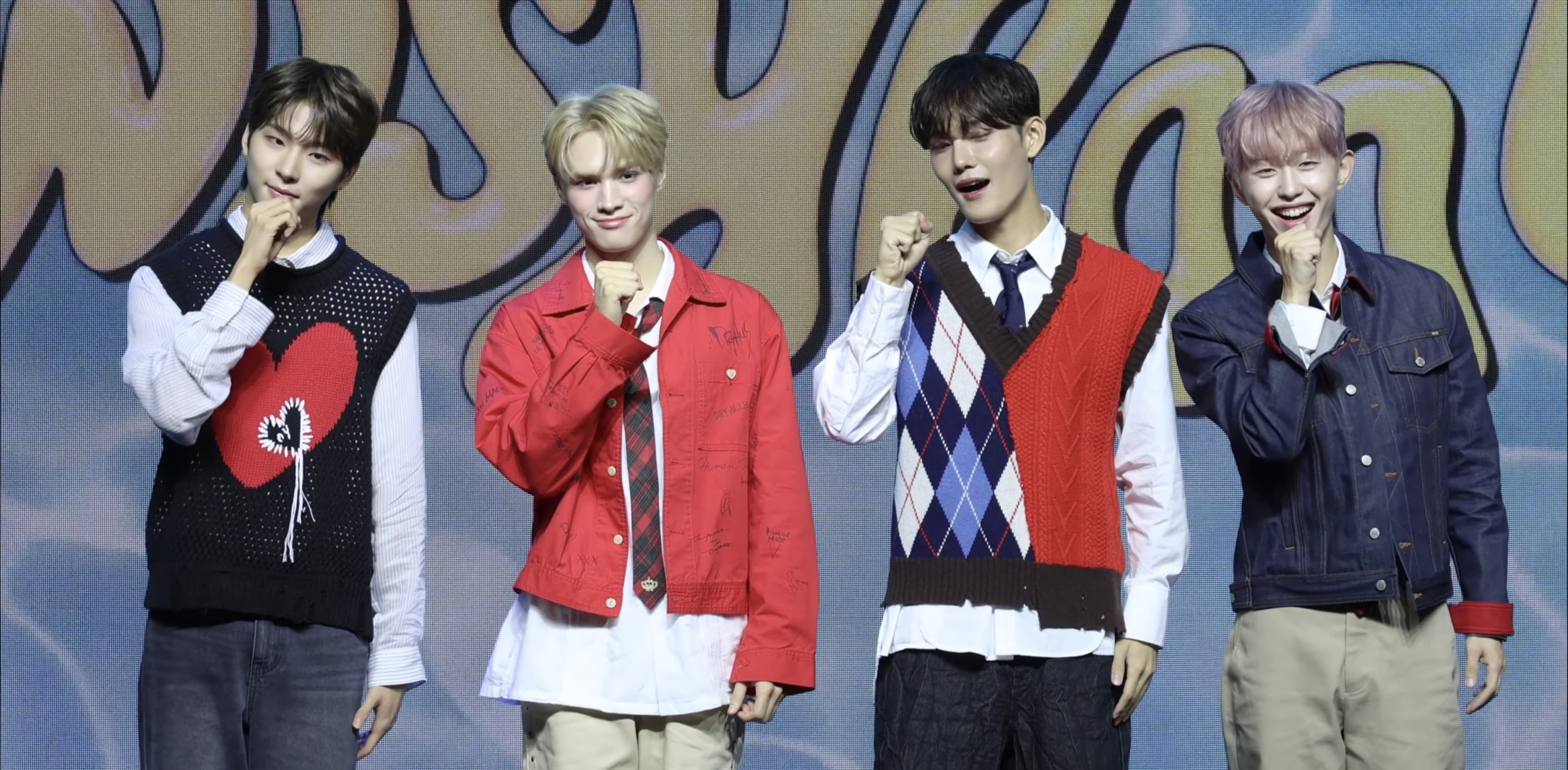
B.D.U at their media showcase for Wishpool in June 2024.

Four hours prior to its release on June 26, B.D.U held a media showcase at Yes24 Wonderlock Hall in Changjeon-dong, Seodaemun District, Seoul for the EP. The EP release was accompanied by a music video for "My One" on the same day, which featured three ladies who symbolized their fans. In addition, the group will embark on a world tour titled "Tour for Wishpool: Flash & Light" on 24 cities across Americas and Europe.

== Track listing ==
Wishpool track listing
No.	Title	Lyrics	Music	Production/Arrangement	Length
1.	"My One"	Pdogg; Cazzi Opeia; Gabriel Brandes; Hwang Yoo-bin; Jeon Ji-eun; MG; Alphabet (153/Joombas); Lee Yi-jin	Pdogg; Opeia; Brandes; Hwang; Jeon; Alphabet; Lee	Pdogg	3:08
2.	"Everlasting Miracle" (변함없는 기적)	Choi Hansol (SSF Soundz); Kim Tae-hyun; Moon Si-on (SSF Soundz)	Park Geun-tae; Choi Hansol (SSF Soundz); Kim Tae-hyun; Moon Si-on (SSF Soundz)	Park; Choi; Kim; Moon	4:25
3.	"Forget All" (다 잊어)	VIP	VIP	VIP	2:59
4.	"Ah-Ooh!"	Kang Min-seo	Kang; Khannow	Khannow; Lee Chan-young	2:51
5.	"My One" (English version)	Pdogg; Cazzi Opeia; Gabriel Brandes; Hwang Yoo-bin; Jeon Ji-eun; MG; Alphabet (153/Joombas); Lee Yi-jin; Chanti (The Hub)	Pdogg; Opeia; Brandes; Hwang; Jeon; Alphabet; Lee	Pdogg	3:08
Total length:					16:31

== Charts ==
Chart performance for Wishpool
Chart (2024)	Peak position
South Korean Albums (Circle)	13

== Release history ==
Release history for Wishpool
Region	Date	Format	Label
South Korea	June 26, 2024	CD; digital download; streaming	Orca; Genie
Various	June 26, 2024	Digital download; streaming	Orca; Genie
