= List of Boys Planet contestants =

Boys Planet is a South Korean reality competition series, where trainees from around the world, primarily South Korea, China, Taiwan, Japan, Thailand, Vietnam, the United States, and Canada, competed to debut in a nine-member boy group. The 98 contestants formed two large groups (K-Group and G-Group), each consisting of 49 contestants. After the final episode, the final top nine contestants were selected to debut as members of the boy group Zerobaseone (ZB1).

== Contestants ==
The English names of contestants are presented in Eastern order in accordance with the official website.

The ages of all contestants are presented in accordance with the international age system as of Episode 1 (February 2, 2023).

Color key

Final member of Zerobaseone
Contestant was eliminated in the final episode
Contestant was eliminated in the third elimination round
Contestant was eliminated in the second elimination round
Contestant was eliminated in the first elimination round
Contestant left the show
Top 9 for the Episode

List of Boys Planet contestants
Company	Contestant	Age (Note: As of Episode 1 (February 2, 2023).)	Masters' evaluation		Ranking																						
Company	Contestant	Age	Masters' evaluation		Ep. 1 (Note: As of February 2, 2023, at 21:00 KST.)	Ep. 2 (Note: As of February 9, 2023, at 21:00 KST.)	Ep. 3 (Note: As of February 16, 2023, at 22:00 KST.) (Note: Only ranks 1–3 and 40–60 were shown.)		Episode 5 (Note: A livestream entitled 1st Survivor Announcement Ceremony revealed the ranking of the first surviving contestant.)				Ep. 6 (Note: As of March 9, 2023 at 22:00 KST.)		Episode 8 (Note: A livestream entitled 2nd Survivor Announcement Ceremony revealed the ranking of the first surviving contestant.)				Ep. 9 (Note: During the episode, the interim results for ranks 6, 7, and 14–18 were revealed.)	Episode 11 (Note: A livestream entitled 3rd Survivor Announcement Ceremony revealed the ranking of the first surviving contestant.)				Interim Rank (Note: As of April 17, 2023, 3PM KST) (Note: Only partial interim results for ranks 3, 10, and 11 were revealed.)	Episode 12		Final
Company	Contestant	Age	Ep. 1–2 (Note: Star Level Test.)	Re-test (Note: Reassessment based on the signal song.)	#	#	#	Points	#	Votes		Points	#	Points	#	Votes		Points	#	#	Votes		Points	#	#	Points	Final
Company	Contestant	Age	Ep. 1–2	Re-test	#	#	#	Points	#	Korean	Global	Points	#	Points	#	Korean	Global	Points	#	#	Korean	Global	Points	#	#	Points	Final
K-Group (South Korea)
Cube Entertainment (큐브)	Bak Do-ha (박도하)	21	0/4 stars	0/4 stars	28	25	Not Shown		24	120,784	385,881	1,140,151	43	204,607	46	Not Shown			Eliminated								46
Wake One Entertainment (웨이크원)	Cha Woong-ki (차웅기) (Note: Cha Woong-ki and Oh Sung-min were members of TO1 and contestants on World Klass.)	21	1/4 stars	2/4 stars	10	17	Not Shown		25	136,790	329,584	1,137,561	34	282,786	26	126,418	416,876	1,107,219	18	20	202,741	643,444	1,817,478	Eliminated			20
FNC Entertainment	Choi Ji-ho (최지호) (Note: Choi Ji-ho, Jang Yeo-jun, and Park Gun-wook were contestants on Extreme Debut: Wild Idol.)	19	2/4 stars	2/4 stars	55	58	Not Shown		55	Not Shown			Eliminated														55
Oui Entertainment (위)	Choi Seung-hun (최승훈) (Note: Choi Seung-hun was a child actor.)	15	1/4 stars	0/4 stars	46	52	59	138,845	57	Not Shown			Eliminated														57
Redstart ENM (레드스타트 ENM)	Choi Woo-jin (최우진)	19	3/4 stars	1/4 stars	41	46	52	171,089	51	20,040	100,778	368,077	50	103,062	50	Not Shown			Eliminated								50
H1ghr Music (하이어뮤직레코즈)	Han Seo-bin (한서빈)	17	4/4 stars	3/4 stars	70	66	Not Shown		60	Not Shown			Eliminated														60
Yuehua Entertainment (위에화)	Han Yu-jin (한유진)	16	4/4 stars	3/4 stars	3	2	3	3,483,194	4	924,664	1,997,419	6,757,634	2	2,909,883	3	789,745	1,847,342	6,045,275	Not Shown	5	397,884	1,210,430	3,501,402	Not Shown	9	1,196,622	9
Jellyfish Entertainment (젤리피쉬)	Han Yu-seop (한유섭)	19	3/4 stars	2/4 stars	74	71	Not Shown		85	Not Shown			Eliminated														85
Redstart ENM (레드스타트이엔엠)	Hong Keon-hee (홍건희)	19	3/4 stars	3/4 stars	87	87	Not Shown		84	Not Shown			Eliminated														84
FirstOne Entertainment (퍼스트원)	Jang Ji-ho (장지호) (Note: Jang Ji-ho and Seo Won are members of NINE.i.)	19	2/4 stars	2/4 stars	72	75	Not Shown		63	Not Shown			Eliminated														63
Woollim Entertainment (울림)	Jang Min-seo (장민서)	17	0/4 stars	1/4 stars	Left the show																						
Jellyfish Entertainment (젤리피쉬)	Jang Yeo-jun (장여준)	18	3/4 stars	2/4 stars	51	60	60	137,102	62	Not Shown			Eliminated														62
Oui Entertainment (위)	Jeon Ho-young (전호영) (Note: Jeon Ho-young made cameo appearances in the Korean dramas Ghost Doctor and Yumi's Cells, as well as in the Netflix movie To All the Boys: Always and Forever.)	19	2/4 stars	1/4 stars	81	80	Not Shown		71	Not Shown			Eliminated														71
Allart Entertainment (올라트)	Jeon Woo-seok (전우석)	20	0/4 stars	2/4 stars	60	72	Not Shown		67	Not Shown			Eliminated														67
Individual Trainee (개인연습생)	Jeong I-chan (정이찬) (Note: Jeong I-chan was a contestant on I-Land.)	22	2/4 stars	2/4 stars	52	55	56	145,256	52	11,527	142,653	345,335	49	113,935	49	Not Shown			Eliminated								49
Yuehua Entertainment (위에화)	Ji Yun-seo (지윤서)	19	4/4 stars	3/4 stars	86	53	49	181,194	47	49,239	78,759	428,248	41	230,839	41	Not Shown			Eliminated								41
Individual Trainee (개인연습생)	Jo Eun-woo (조은우)	19	1/4 stars	–	Left the show																						
Individual Trainee (개인연습생)	Jung Ho-jin (정호진)	20	1/4 stars	1/4 stars	48	68	Not Shown		65	Not Shown			Eliminated														65
Individual Trainee (개인연습생)	Jung Hwan-rok (정환록) (Note: Jung Hwan-rok is a member of withus.)	21	2/4 stars	3/4 stars	Left the show																						
CABIN74 (캐빈74)	Jung Min-gyu (정민규)	24	0/4 stars	0/4 stars	50	39	Not Shown		27	153,454	208,559	1,054,053	32	290,220	38	Not Shown			Eliminated								38
Woollim Entertainment (울림)	Jung Se-yun (정세윤)	16	0/4 stars	0/4 stars	68	85	Not Shown		74	Not Shown			Eliminated														74
Yuehua Entertainment (위에화)	Kim Gyu-vin (김규빈)	19	4/4 stars	3/4 stars	5	4	Not Shown		6	783,359	1,514,108	5,511,180	6	2,283,675	6	694,761	1,319,888	5,088,364	16	7	407,240	785,674	3,017,119	Not Shown	7	1,346,105	7
NESTMANAGEMENT (네스트매니지먼트)	Kim Ji-woong (김지웅) (Note: Kim Ji-woong was a member of INX and the pre-debut groups ATEEN and B.I.T., and was a contestant on Burn Up 30.)	25	3/4 stars	3/4 stars	2	3	2	3,559,405	3	848,515	2,400,044	6,944,462	5	2,529,910	5	686,209	1,983,266	5,751,211	Not Shown	3	385,631	1,287,173	3,536,122	Not Shown	8	1,338,984	8
Individual Trainee (개인연습생)	Kim Min-hyuk (김민혁)	24	2/4 stars	3/4 stars	90	82	Not Shown		76	Not Shown			Eliminated														76
Redstart ENM (레드스타트 ENM)	Kim Min-seoung (김민성) (Note: Kim Min-seoung, Lee Seung-hwan, Lee Ye-dam, Park Han-bin were contestants on Loud.)	20	4/4 stars	3/4 stars	78	79	Not Shown		58	Not Shown			Eliminated														58
Wake One Entertainment (웨이크원)	Kim Tae-rae (김태래) (Note: Kim Tae-rae was a contestant on Top 10 Student.)	21	3/4 stars	4/4 stars	9	12	Not Shown		11	572,660	686,987	3,514,786	7	2,172,772	7	716,438	1,206,278	4,790,626	Not Shown	4	483,920	881,110	3,519,583	11	6	1,349,595	6
Redstart ENM (레드스타트 ENM)	Kum Jun-hyeon (금준현) (Note: Kum Jun-hyeon appeared in Beautiful World.)	20	4/4 stars	4/4 stars	31	31	Not Shown		14	260,720	495,016	1,896,096	12	1,317,229	10	466,902	746,044	3,075,589	Not Shown	16	293,395	577,185	2,187,613	Not Shown	14	848,986	14
143 Entertainment (143엔터테인먼트)	Lee Da-eul (이다을)	19	2/4 stars	0/4 stars	4	9	Not Shown		13 (Note: Lee Da-eul's rank and points were initially revealed during the 1st Survivor Announcement Ceremony livestream.)	268,805	627,749	2,103,268	46	177,458	47	Not Shown			Eliminated								47
Great M Entertainment (그레이트엠)	Lee Dong-gun (이동건)	18	1/4 stars	2/4 stars	43	44	51	177,884	48	13,200	169,339	387,236	51	81,739	51	Not Shown			Eliminated								51
TOP Media (티오피미디어)	Lee Dong-yeol (이동열) (Note: Lee Dong-yeol and Lee Hwan-hee are members of Up10tion.)	25	2/4 stars	1/4 stars	26	33	Not Shown		40	66,411	202,621	664,047	47	172,206	44	Not Shown			Eliminated								44
Cube Entertainment (큐브)	Lee Hoe-taek (이회택) (Note: Lee Hoe-taek is a member of Pentagon and a former member of Triple H and Super Five.)	30	4/4 stars	3/4 stars	6	6	Not Shown		7	478,834	1,742,488	4,469,324	10	1,338,595	11	328,217	1,145,640	3,055,925	Not Shown	10	263,565	871,805	2,406,896	Not Shown	13	935,254	13
TOP Media (티오피미디어)	Lee Hwan-hee (이환희)	25	3/4 stars	1/4 stars	38	42	42	222,887	46	63,688	168,531	507,947	Left the show (Note: Lee Hwan-hee left the show after the first elimination due to health problems.)														52
Wake One Entertainment (웨이크원)	Lee Jeong-hyeon (이정현)	21	3/4 stars	3/4 stars	35	43	41	248,719	39	84,968	149,181	676,361	29	383,238	24	185,150	270,625	1,185,270	15	17	260,595	431,541	2,041,636	Not Shown	15	715,705	15
Individual Trainee (개인연습생)	Lee Seung-hwan (이승환) (Note: Lee Seung-hwan was a contestant on Under Nineteen and a member of 1the9.)	23	2/4 stars	3/4 stars	13	16	Not Shown		20	137,004	662,583	1,569,664	24	550,610	21	152,061	609,652	1,470,722	Not Shown	24	Not Shown			Eliminated			24
LM Entertainment	Lee Ye-dam (이예담)	21	4/4 stars	4/4 stars	45	47	46	199,723	42	54,356	219,178	632,536	38	248,293	36	Not Shown			Eliminated								36
143 Entertainment (143엔터테인먼트)	Lim Jun-seo (임준서)	18	2/4 stars	1/4 stars	19	21	Not Shown		30	154,069	174,791	1,016,985	36	265,140	40	Not Shown			Eliminated								40
Wake One Entertainment (웨이크원)	Mun Jung-hyun (문정현)	18	3/4 stars	4/4 stars	24	35	Not Shown		23	173,899	209,832	1,145,501	30	366,626	29	160,405	226,610	1,016,789	Eliminated								29
Wake One Entertainment (웨이크원)	Oh Sung-min (오성민)	22	2/4 stars	3/4 stars	17	24	Not Shown		34	96,616	174,879	760,796	44	198,846	35	Not Shown			Eliminated								35
Jellyfish Entertainment (젤리피쉬)	Park Gun-wook (박건욱)	18	3/4 stars	4/4 stars	15	10	Not Shown		10	424,712	1,431,312	3,728,699	11	1,327,449	9	338,834	1,242,684	3,228,542	Not Shown	12	227,208	955,454	2,329,809	Not Shown	5	1,386,039	5
Individual Trainee (개인연습생)	Park Gwan-young (박관영) (Note: Park Gwan-young was a contestant on Stars Awakening.)	23	2/4 stars	2/4 stars	61	92	Not Shown		68	Not Shown			Eliminated														68
Wake One Entertainment (웨이크원)	Park Han-bin (박한빈)	21	4/4 stars	4/4 stars	34	36	Not Shown		22	151,471	426,785	1,327,899	13	1,138,119	13	319,978	795,702	2,719,441	14	11 (Note: Park Han-bin's rank and points were initially revealed during the 3rd Survivor Announcement Ceremony livestream.)	277,403	783,470	2,365,604	10	11	1,076,065	11
Jellyfish Entertainment (젤리피쉬)	Park Hyun-been (박현빈)	18	3/4 stars	3/4 stars	40	50	54	158,347	49	39,237	72,877	376,700	48	123,848	48	Not Shown			Eliminated								48
H1ghr Music (하이어뮤직레코즈)	Park Ji-hoo (박지후)	17	4/4 stars	3/4 stars	47	49	48	194,533	44	66,861	87,145	516,507	39	238,539	33	Not Shown			Eliminated								33
Wake One Entertainment (웨이크원)	Park Min-seok (박민석)	21	2/4 stars	1/4 stars	64	84	Not Shown		61	Not Shown			Eliminated														61
FirstOne Entertainment (퍼스트원)	Seo Won (서원) (Note: Seo Won was a contestant on Dancing High.)	23	3/4 stars	4/4 stars	18	22	Not Shown		18	181,959	583,003	1,664,080	20	609,101	18	160,956	620,298	1,624,641	Not Shown	25	Not Shown			Eliminated			25
Studio Gl1de (스튜디오 글라이드)	Sung Han-bin (성한빈)	22	3/4 stars	4/4 stars	1	1	1	4,226,359	1	1,043,564	2,818,836	8,343,418	1	3,307,923	1	864,631	2,360,757	7,043,213	Not Shown	1	641,077	1,748,576	5,389,363	3	2	1,888,414	2
Rain Company (레인컴퍼니)	Yeom Tae-gyun (염태균) (Note: Yeom Tae-gyun is a member of Ciipher.)	21	2/4 stars	3/4 stars	Left the show																						
Yuehua Entertainment (위에화)	Yoo Seung-eon (유승언)	20	4/4 stars	3/4 stars	44	26	Not Shown		17	256,031	348,099	1,689,997	19	627,720	17	256,931	348,099	1,941,578	17	14	329,368	477,070	2,242,196	Not Shown	16	613,963	16
Individual Trainee (개인연습생)	Yoon Jong-woo (윤종우) (Note: Yoon Jong-woo was a member of Black Level.)	23	3/4 stars	1/4 stars	73	67	45	203,043	38	72,487	204,190	692,766	16	728,860	15	258,264	849,578	2,259,317	Not Shown	15	211,875	908,368	2,194,327	Not Shown	18	557,811	18
G-Group (Canada, China, Japan, Thailand, Taiwan, U.S., Vietnam)
Wake One Entertainment (웨이크원)	Anthonny (Note: Full Name: Iinuma Anthonny (飯沼 アントニー)) (アントニー) / (안토니) (Note: Anthonny and Yuki were contestants on Produce 101 Japan Season 2.)	19	3/4 stars	3/4 stars	8	11	Not Shown		19	69,905	1,002,268	1,604,766	31	309,114	32	Not Shown			Eliminated								32
Yuehua Entertainment (위에화)	Brian (Note: Full Name: Hé Tíngwēi (何廷威)) (何廷威) / (브라이언)	21	3/4 stars	1/4 stars	37	28	Not Shown		41	91,794	178,290	634,033	33	285,579	37	Not Shown			Eliminated								37
Top Class Entertainment (托璞司娱乐)	Cai Jinxin (蔡锦昕) / (차이진신)	20	0/4 stars	0/4 stars	42	45	47	198,227	50	61,100	82,301	374,970	25	453,496	31	Not Shown			Eliminated								31
Beijing Youhug Media Co., Ltd. (耀客传媒)	Chen Jianyu (陈建宇) / (천지안위) (Note: Chen Jianyu, Chen Yugeng, Krystian, Xuan Hao, and Zhang Shuaibo were contestants on the third season of Youth With You 3.)	25	1/4 stars	1/4 stars	27	34	Not Shown		45	47,722	230,991	508,693	35	266,785	39	Not Shown			Eliminated								39
Individual Trainee (개인연습생)	Chen Kuanjui (陳冠叡) / (천관루이)	23	4/4 stars	3/4 stars	54	30	Not Shown		26	59,877	538,204	1,059,856	23	570,537	22	80,491	738,761	1,312,596	Not Shown	23	Not Shown			Eliminated			23
Individual Trainee (개인연습생)	Chen Liang (陈梁) / (천리앙)	23	2/4 stars	0/4 stars	83	61	57	143,815	70	Not Shown			Eliminated														70
Individual Trainee (개인연습생)	Chen Renyou (陳任佑) / (천런유) (Note: Chen Renyou and Qiu Shengyang were contestants on Atom Boyz.)	20	2/4 stars	1/4 stars	59	56	58	140,745	69	Not Shown			Eliminated														69
T Entertainment	Chen Yugeng (陈誉庚) / (천위겅)	25	1/4 stars	1/4 stars	75	76	Not Shown		82	Not Shown			Eliminated														82
Individual Trainee (개인연습생)	Cong (Note: Full Name: Nguyễn Thành Công Chinese Full Name: Ruǎn Chénggōng (阮成功) Korean Full Name: Won Seonggong (원성공)) (Công) / (콩)	23	1/4 stars	3/4 stars	66	48	Not Shown		35	67,052	355,367	754,636	40	238,039	43	Not Shown			Eliminated								43
Fantagio (판타지오)	Dang Hong Hai (Đặng Hồng Hải) / (당홍하이) (Note: Dang Hong Hai was a contestant on the fourth season of The Voice Kids of Vietnam.)	20	2/4 stars	3/4 stars	25	29	Not Shown		33	55,615	414,962	781,564	37	257,333	42	Not Shown			Eliminated								42
Stardust Entertainment (砾子星尘文化传媒有限公司)	Dong Dong (Note: Full Name: Dōng Jí Xiáng (东诘翔)) (东东) / (동동)	23	1/4 stars	1/4 stars	91	59	Not Shown		79	Not Shown			Eliminated														79
Stardust Entertainment (砾子星尘文化传媒有限公司)	Feng Junlan (冯俊岚) / (펑쥔란) (Note: Feng Junlan is a member of ECAT.)	24	2/4 stars	2/4 stars	92	89	Not Shown		93	Not Shown			Eliminated														93
Individual Trainee (개인연습생)	Haru (Note: Full Name: Kato Haru (加藤暖琉)) (暖琉) / (하루)	17	2/4 stars	2/4 stars	53	64	Not Shown		66	Not Shown			Eliminated														66
Wake One Entertainment (웨이크원)	Haruto (Note: Full Name: Maeda Haruto (前田晴翔)) (晴翔) / (하루토) (Note: Maeda Haruto was a contestant on Loud.)	19	4/4 stars	4/4 stars	39	20	Not Shown		16	89,646	1,058,396	1,764,148	15	1,002,517	16	77,203	1,440,154	2,198,036	Not Shown	22	Not Shown			Eliminated			22
RBW	Hiroto (Note: Full Name: Ikumi Hiroto (井汲大翔)) (大翔) / (히로토) (Note: Hiroto was a contestant on Produce 101 Japan.) (Note: Hiroto and Ichika were contestants on Produce Camp 2021.)	21	2/4 stars	2/4 stars	11	15	Not Shown		21	95,458	743,432	1,381,864	27	425,135	28	78,994	560,757	1,077,299	Not Shown	21	167,748	595,605	1,582,819	Eliminated			21
Watanabe Entertainment (ワタナベ エンターテインメント)	Hyo (Note: Full Name: Saitō Hiyō (斎藤飛燿)) (飛燿) / (효)	21	0/4 stars	2/4 stars	62	90	Not Shown		86	Not Shown			Eliminated														86
OD Entertainment	Ichika (Note: Full Name: Uehara Ichika (上原一翔)) (一翔) / (이치카)	31	1/4 stars	0/4 stars	58	62	Not Shown		75	Not Shown			Eliminated														75
MLD Entertainment	Itsuki (Note: Full Name: Watanabe Itsuki (渡邊樹)) (樹) / (이츠키)	17	0/4 stars	2/4 stars	65	81	Not Shown		88	Not Shown			Eliminated														88
FM Entertainment	Jay (Note: Full Name: Kapossy, Jay Steven) (제이) (Note: Jay, Min, and Wumuti were contestants on Under Nineteen.)	22	4/4 stars	4/4 stars	30	8	Not Shown		9	343,093	1,988,046	4,081,057	9	1,376,633	12 (Note: Jay's rank and points were initially revealed during the 2nd Survivor Announcement Ceremony livestream.)	137,977	1,751,667	2,872,951	Not Shown	13	62,829	1,400,606	2,264,984	Not Shown	10	1,080,505	10
Stardust Promotion (スターダストプロモーション)	Kei (Note: Full Name: Okano Kei (岡野敬)) (敬) / (케이) (Note: Kei is a member of EDAMAME BEANS.)	17	2/4 stars	2/4 stars	76	83	Not Shown		87	Not Shown			Eliminated														87
Rain Company (레인컴퍼니)	Keita (Note: Full Name: Terazono Keita (寺園佳汰)) (佳汰) / (케이타) (Note: Keita was a contestant on YG Treasure Box and is a current member of Ciipher.)	22	4/4 stars	4/4 stars	14	14	Not Shown		8	311,495	2,038,551	4,107,663	8	1,881,172	8	202,889	2,599,031	4,254,415	6	6	94,012	2,079,095	3,069,047	Not Shown	12	1,029,999	12
Individual Trainee (개인연습생)	Krystian (Note: Full Name: Wáng Nánjūn (王南钧)) (王南钧) / (크리스티안) (Note: Krystian was a contestant on Super Boy and is a member of Now United.)	24	2/4 stars	2/4 stars	21	23	Not Shown		37	18,023	489,839	713,399	45	196,543	45	Not Shown			Eliminated								45
Individual Trainee (개인연습생)	Lin Shiyuan (林士元) / (린스위안)	25	1/4 stars	0/4 stars	89	91	Not Shown		92	Not Shown			Eliminated														92
Individual Trainee (개인연습생)	Ma Jingxiang (马靖翔) / (마징시앙) (Note: Ma Jingxiang is a member of the pre-debut boy group Midsummer Cubs.)	19	2/4 stars	0/4 stars	16	27	Not Shown		32	118,148	250,791	843,660	28	397,838	30	147,348	200,162	923,750	Eliminated								30
Wake One Entertainment (웨이크원)	Min (Note: Full Name: Thanakorn Wichanukroh (ธนากร วิชานุเคราะห์)) (มิน) / (민)	23	3/4 stars	3/4 stars	80	65	Not Shown		59	Not Shown			Eliminated														59
FNC Entertainment	Na Kamden (Note: Korean Full Name: Na Du-bin (나두빈)) (나캠든) (Note: Na Kamden was a contestant on Extreme Debut: Wild Idol.)	22	3/4 stars	3/4 stars	82	37	40	264,314	31	135,650	283,288	962,611	22	573,627	20	200,211	390,565	1,507,389	Not Shown	18	298,261	426,049	2,022,976	Not Shown	17	601,198	17
Individual Trainee (개인연습생)	Nice (Note: Full Name: Boripat Jamsat (บริพัฒน์ จำสัตย์)) (ไนซ์) / (나이스)	23	0/4 stars	0/4 stars	71	63	Not Shown		78	Not Shown			Eliminated														78
Yuehua Entertainment (위에화)	Ollie (Note: Full Name: Liú Tiānyuè (刘天跃)) (刘天跃) / (올리)	17	3/4 stars	0/4 stars	23	18	Not Shown		28	57,483	616,473	1,050,683	26	439,384	27	61,620	636,467	1,095,860	Not Shown	26	Not Shown			Eliminated			26
Individual Trainee (개인연습생)	Osuke (央修) / (오스케)	20	1/4 stars	2/4 stars	63	69	Not Shown		83	Not Shown			Eliminated														83
Hyper Rhythm (하이퍼리듬)	Ouju (Note: Full Name: Murakami Ouju (村上桜樹)) (桜樹) / (오쥬)	19	0/4 stars	2/4 stars	67	78	Not Shown		72	Not Shown			Eliminated														72
Tpop (踢帕娛樂)	Qiu Shengyang (邱勝揚) / (치우성양)	22	2/4 stars	1/4 stars	88	70	Not Shown		81	Not Shown			Eliminated														81
Yuehua Entertainment (위에화)	Ricky (Note: Full Name: Shěn Quánruì (沈泉锐)) (沈泉锐) / (리키)	19	3/4 stars	2/4 stars	12	13	Not Shown		12	121,057	1,228,473	2,122,327	14	1,131,856	14	233,522	1,215,285	2,616,791	7	8	251,118	1,117,293	2,851,613	Not Shown	4	1,572,089	4
Individual Trainee (개인연습생)	Riku (Note: Full Name: Machida Riku (町田陸)) (陸) / (리쿠)	19	1/4 stars	2/4 stars	93	88	Not Shown		91	Not Shown			Eliminated														91
MNH Entertainment (엠앤에이치)	Seok Matthew (Note: Korean Full Name: Seok Woo-hyun (석우현)) (석매튜)	21	3/4 stars	4/4 stars	32	5	Not Shown		2	838,865	2,470,738	6,983,610	3	2,825,146	4	529,478	2,583,500	5,812,430	Not Shown	9	207,736	1,343,815	2,718,044	Not Shown	3	1,702,174	3
YY Entertainment (와이와이)	Takuto (Note: Full Name: Toyonaga Takuto (豊永拓斗)) (拓斗) / (타쿠토)	16	0/4 stars	1/4 stars	20	19	Not Shown		15	223,223	696,749	1,882,600	21	573,842	25	127,763	465,513	1,175,739	Not Shown	27	Not Shown			Eliminated			27
One Cool Jacso Entertainment (天加一文化)	Tao Yuan (陶源) / (도원) (Note: Tao Yuan was a contestant on We Are Young and Stars Awakening and is a member of the pre-debut boy group OCJ NEWBIES.)	23	1/4 stars	–	Left the show																						
FNC Entertainment Japan (FNC 엔터테인먼트 재팬)	Toui (透唯) / (토우이)	20	0/4 stars	1/4 stars	85	93	Not Shown		89	Not Shown			Eliminated														89
Asia Star Entertainment (亚洲星空娱乐)	Wang Yanhong (王颜宏) / (왕옌홍)	25	0/4 stars	0/4 stars	79	77	Not Shown		77	Not Shown			Eliminated														77
Chromosome (染色体娱乐集团)	Wang Zihao (王子浩) / (왕즈하오)	22	3/4 stars	4/4 stars	29	38	Not Shown		29	31,866	617,231	1,039,147	17	654,985	19	36,624	1,039,895	1,600,605	Not Shown	19	45,489	1,329,361	1,889,270	Eliminated			19
One Cool Jacso Entertainment (天加一文化)	Wen Yechen (文邺辰) / (원예천) (Note: Wen Yechen was a contestant on Youth With You.)	23	1/4 stars	0/4 stars	56	57	53	165,935	56	Not Shown			Eliminated														56
FirstOne Entertainment (퍼스트원)	Winnie (Note: Full Name: Pattipong Kasemsan Na Ayutthaya (ปฏิพงษ์ เกษมสันต์ ณ อยุธยา)) (วินนี่) / (위니) (Note: Winnie is a member of NINE.i.)	25	1/4 stars	1/4 stars	77	73	Not Shown		80	Not Shown			Eliminated														80
JPark Company (제이파크컴퍼니)	Wumuti (Note: Full Name: Wúmùtí Tǔ'ěrxùn (吾木提·吐尔逊) Uyghur Full Name: Umut Tursun (أمۇت تۇرسۇن)) (吾木提) / (우무티) (Note: Wumuti was a member of SWIN-S and a contestant on Super Idol.)	24	2/4 stars	3/4 stars	49	51	50	179,719	43	23,170	324,127	521,445	42	219,507	34	Not Shown			Eliminated								34
Show City Times (少城时代)	Xuan Hao (宣淏) / (쉬안하오) (Note: Xuan Hao is a member of boy group DREAM4.)	28	1/4 stars	1/4 stars	33	41	44	204,748	54	23,549	180,042	336,550	Eliminated														54
Asia Star Entertainment (亚洲星空娱乐)	Yang Jun (杨钧) / (양쥔)	24	0/4 stars	0/4 stars	84	74	Not Shown		73	Not Shown			Eliminated														73
Individual Trainee (개인연습생)	Yuki (Note: Full Name: Miura Yuki (三浦由暉)) (由暉) / (유키)	22	0/4 stars	1/4 stars	36	40	43	215,353	53	40,511	126,471	341,689	Eliminated														53
Individual Trainee (개인연습생)	Yutaka (Note: Full Name: Nozaki Yutaka (野嵜豊)) (豊) / (유타카)	24	0/4 stars	1/4 stars	57	54	55	150,761	64	Not Shown			Eliminated														64
Individual Trainee (개인연습생)	Yuto (Note: Full Name: Takano Yūto (高野佑都)) (佑都) / (유토)	19	2/4 stars	2/4 stars	69	86	Not Shown		90	Not Shown			Eliminated														90
Yuehua Entertainment (위에화)	Zhang Hao (章昊) / (장하오)	23	4/4 stars	4/4 stars	7	7	Not Shown		5	594,480	2,259,107	5,636,185	4	2,673,322	2	561,860	2,599,059	6,128,945	Not Shown	2	329,902	1,835,261	4,342,882	Not Shown	1	1,998,154	1
WELL Entertainment (文尔娱乐)	Zhang Shuaibo (张帅博) / (장슈아이보)	21	1/4 stars	1/4 stars	22	32	Not Shown		36	100,017	226,367	732,400	18	645,683	23	199,937	290,028	1,277,094	Not Shown	28	Not Shown			Eliminated			28

=== Prior to Boys Planet ===
K-Group
G-Group

== Star Level Test (Episode 1–2) ==
Key

All star	4/4 stars
3 star	3/4 stars
2 star	2/4 stars
1 star	1/4 stars
No star	0/4 stars

The Star Level Test involves the contestants rating their own skills out of four stars by placing stickers on their name tags, before being re-assessed by the show's mentors through performances.

Bold team numbers are teams whose performances were partially or entirely unaired on broadcast. (Note: Full versions of the unaired performances were posted to YouTube by Mnet on February 2 (Episode 1) and February 9, 2023 (Episode 2).)

Star Level Test (1st evaluation results)
Performance			Group	Company/Region	Contestant	Self assessment	Screening level	Performance			Group	Company/Region	Contestant	Self assessment	Screening level
#	Original artist(s)	Song	Group	Company/Region	Contestant	Self assessment	Screening level	#	Original artist(s)	Song	Group	Company/Region	Contestant	Self assessment	Screening level
Episode 1								Episode 2							
1	Verivery	"G.B.T.B." (Go Beyond the Barrier)	K	Jellyfish Entertainment	Han Yu-seop	4/4 stars	3/4 stars	22	Jessi	"Nunu Nana"	K	Redstart ENM	Choi Woo-jin	4/4 stars	3/4 stars
1	Verivery	"G.B.T.B." (Go Beyond the Barrier)	K	Jellyfish Entertainment	Jang Yeo-jun	4/4 stars	3/4 stars	22	Jessi	"Nunu Nana"	K	Redstart ENM	Hong Keon-hee	4/4 stars	3/4 stars
1	Verivery	"G.B.T.B." (Go Beyond the Barrier)	K	Jellyfish Entertainment	Park Gun-wook	4/4 stars	3/4 stars	22	Jessi	"Nunu Nana"	K	Redstart ENM	Kum Jun-hyeon	4/4 stars	4/4 stars
1	Verivery	"G.B.T.B." (Go Beyond the Barrier)	K	Jellyfish Entertainment	Park Hyun-been	4/4 stars	3/4 stars	22	Jessi	"Nunu Nana"	K	Redstart ENM	Kim Min-seoung	4/4 stars	4/4 stars
2	NCT Dream	"Glitch Mode" (버퍼링)	G	Wake One Entertainment	Anthonny	2/4 stars	3/4 stars	23	Bastarz	"Conduct Zero" (품행제로)	G	Osaka, Japan	Hiroto	4/4 stars	2/4 stars
2	NCT Dream	"Glitch Mode" (버퍼링)	G	Wake One Entertainment	Haruto	3/4 stars	4/4 stars	23	Bastarz	"Conduct Zero" (품행제로)	G	Osaka, Japan	Kei	4/4 stars	2/4 stars
2	NCT Dream	"Glitch Mode" (버퍼링)	G	Wake One Entertainment	Min	3/4 stars	3/4 stars	23	Bastarz	"Conduct Zero" (품행제로)	G	Osaka, Japan	Keita	4/4 stars	4/4 stars
3	SuperM	"Tiger Inside" (호랑이)	G	Taipei	Chen Kuanjui	4/4 stars	4/4 stars	23	Bastarz	"Conduct Zero" (품행제로)	G	Osaka, Japan	Yuto	4/4 stars	2/4 stars
3	SuperM	"Tiger Inside" (호랑이)	G	Taipei	Chen Renyou	3/4 stars	2/4 stars	24	The Boyz	"Reveal"	G	Shanghai, China	Cai Jinxin	1/4 stars	0/4 stars
3	SuperM	"Tiger Inside" (호랑이)	G	Taipei	Dong Dong	3/4 stars	1/4 stars	24	The Boyz	"Reveal"	G	Shanghai, China	Ma Jingxiang	3/4 stars	2/4 stars
3	SuperM	"Tiger Inside" (호랑이)	G	Taipei	Qiu Shengyang	2/4 stars	2/4 stars	24	The Boyz	"Reveal"	G	Shanghai, China	Tao Yuan	2/4 stars	1/4 stars
4	Exo	"Ko Ko Bop"	G	Thailand	Nice	4/4 stars	0/4 stars	24	The Boyz	"Reveal"	G	Shanghai, China	Zhang Shuaibo	2/4 stars	1/4 stars
4	Exo	"Ko Ko Bop"	G	Thailand	Winnie	4/4 stars	1/4 stars	25	TVXQ	"Mirotic" (주문)	K	Individual Trainees	Jung Hwan-rok	4/4 stars	2/4 stars
5	Stray Kids	"God's Menu" (神메뉴)	G	Canton, China	Chen Liang	4/4 stars	2/4 stars	25	TVXQ	"Mirotic" (주문)	K	Individual Trainees	Jeong I-chan	4/4 stars	2/4 stars
5	Stray Kids	"God's Menu" (神메뉴)	G	Canton, China	Feng Junlan	4/4 stars	2/4 stars	25	TVXQ	"Mirotic" (주문)	K	Individual Trainees	Kim Ji-woong	4/4 stars	3/4 stars
5	Stray Kids	"God's Menu" (神메뉴)	G	Canton, China	Lin Shiyuan	4/4 stars	1/4 stars	25	TVXQ	"Mirotic" (주문)	K	Individual Trainees	Lee Seung-hwan	4/4 stars	2/4 stars
5	Stray Kids	"God's Menu" (神메뉴)	G	Canton, China	Xuan Hao	4/4 stars	1/4 stars	25	TVXQ	"Mirotic" (주문)	K	Individual Trainees	Yoon Jong-woo	4/4 stars	3/4 stars
6	SHINee	"View"	G	Vietnam	Cong	3/4 stars	1/4 stars	26	Rain	"Instead of Saying Goodbye" (안녕이란 말 대신)	G	Saitama, Japan	Takuto	3/4 stars	0/4 stars
6	SHINee	"View"	G	Vietnam	Dang Hong Hai	3/4 stars	2/4 stars	26	Rain	"Instead of Saying Goodbye" (안녕이란 말 대신)	G	Saitama, Japan	Takuto	3/4 stars	0/4 stars
7	Crush	"Rush Hour"	G	USA	Jay	3/4 stars	4/4 stars	27	Shinee	"Replay" (누난 너무 예뻐)	K	143 Entertainment	Lee Da-eul	1/4 stars	2/4 stars
7	Crush	"Rush Hour"	G	USA	Na Kamden	3/4 stars	3/4 stars	27	Shinee	"Replay" (누난 너무 예뻐)	K	143 Entertainment	Lim Jun-seo	1/4 stars	2/4 stars
8	NCT 127	"Kick It" (영웅)	G	Yuehua Entertainment	Brian	4/4 stars	3/4 stars	28	Stray Kids	Maniac	G	Hyogo, Japan	Haru	4/4 stars	2/4 stars
8	NCT 127	"Kick It" (영웅)	G	Yuehua Entertainment	Ollie	4/4 stars	3/4 stars	28	Stray Kids	Maniac	G	Hyogo, Japan	Riku	4/4 stars	1/4 stars
8	NCT 127	"Kick It" (영웅)	G	Yuehua Entertainment	Ricky	4/4 stars	3/4 stars	29	Baekhyun	"UN Village"	G	Xinjiang, China	Wumuti	4/4 stars	2/4 stars
8	NCT 127	"Kick It" (영웅)	G	Yuehua Entertainment	Zhang Hao	4/4 stars	4/4 stars	29	Baekhyun	"UN Village"	G	Xinjiang, China	Wumuti	4/4 stars	2/4 stars
9	NCT 127	"Kick It" (영웅)	K	Yuehua Entertainment	Han Yu-jin	4/4 stars	4/4 stars	30	iKon	"Love Scenario" (사랑을 했다)	K	OUI Entertainment	Choi Seung-hun	2/4 stars	1/4 stars
9	NCT 127	"Kick It" (영웅)	K	Yuehua Entertainment	Ji Yun-seo	4/4 stars	4/4 stars	30	iKon	"Love Scenario" (사랑을 했다)	K	OUI Entertainment	Jeon Ho-young	1/4 stars	2/4 stars
9	NCT 127	"Kick It" (영웅)	K	Yuehua Entertainment	Kim Gyu-vin	4/4 stars	4/4 stars	31	Got7	"Lullaby"	K	Individual Trainees	Jo Eun-woo	2/4 stars	1/4 stars
9	NCT 127	"Kick It" (영웅)	K	Yuehua Entertainment	Yoo Seung-eon	4/4 stars	4/4 stars	31	Got7	"Lullaby"	K	Individual Trainees	Jung Ho-jin	2/4 stars	1/4 stars
10	2PM	"My House" (우리집)	K	Cube Entertainment	Bak Do-ha	1/4 stars	0/4 stars	31	Got7	"Lullaby"	K	Individual Trainees	Kim Min-hyuk	3/4 stars	2/4 stars
10	2PM	"My House" (우리집)	K	Cube Entertainment	Bak Do-ha	1/4 stars	0/4 stars	31	Got7	"Lullaby"	K	Individual Trainees	Park Gwan-young	3/4 stars	2/4 stars
11	2PM	"My House" (우리집)	K	CABIN74	Jung Min-gyu	1/4 stars	0/4 stars	32	Ateez	"The Real" (Heung version; 멋 (흥:興 Ver.))	K	Wake One Entertainment	Kim Tae-rae	4/4 stars	3/4 stars
11	2PM	"My House" (우리집)	K	CABIN74	Jung Min-gyu	1/4 stars	0/4 stars	32	Ateez	"The Real" (Heung version; 멋 (흥:興 Ver.))	K	Wake One Entertainment	Lee Jeong-hyeon	4/4 stars	3/4 stars
12	Seventeen	"Hot"	G	Sichuan, China	Wang Yanhong	2/4 stars	0/4 stars	32	Ateez	"The Real" (Heung version; 멋 (흥:興 Ver.))	K	Wake One Entertainment	Mun Jung-hyun	4/4 stars	3/4 stars
12	Seventeen	"Hot"	G	Sichuan, China	Yang Jun	2/4 stars	0/4 stars	32	Ateez	"The Real" (Heung version; 멋 (흥:興 Ver.))	K	Wake One Entertainment	Park Han-bin	4/4 stars	4/4 stars
13	Taemin	"Criminal"	K	Great M Entertainment	Lee Dong-gun	3/4 stars	1/4 stars	32	Ateez	"The Real" (Heung version; 멋 (흥:興 Ver.))	K	Wake One Entertainment	Park Min-seok	4/4 stars	2/4 stars
13	Taemin	"Criminal"	K	Great M Entertainment	Lee Dong-gun	3/4 stars	1/4 stars	33	Blackpink	"Shut Down"	K	Cube Entertainment	Lee Hoe-taek	3/4 stars	4/4 stars
14	Taemin	"Criminal"	K	Allart Entertainment	Jeon Woo-seok	4/4 stars	0/4 stars	33	Blackpink	"Shut Down"	K	Cube Entertainment	Lee Hoe-taek	3/4 stars	4/4 stars
14	Taemin	"Criminal"	K	Allart Entertainment	Jeon Woo-seok	4/4 stars	0/4 stars	34	Monsta X	"Gambler"	K	LM Entertainment	Lee Ye-dam	2/4 stars	4/4 stars
15	Exo	"Call Me Baby"	G	Beijing, China	Chen Jianyu	4/4 stars	1/4 stars	34	Monsta X	"Gambler"	K	LM Entertainment	Lee Ye-dam	2/4 stars	4/4 stars
15	Exo	"Call Me Baby"	G	Beijing, China	Chen Yugeng	4/4 stars	1/4 stars	35	Lay Zhang	"Veil"	G	Henan, China	Wang Zihao	2/4 stars	3/4 stars
15	Exo	"Call Me Baby"	G	Beijing, China	Krystian	4/4 stars	2/4 stars	35	Lay Zhang	"Veil"	G	Henan, China	Wang Zihao	2/4 stars	3/4 stars
15	Exo	"Call Me Baby"	G	Beijing, China	Wen Yechen	4/4 stars	1/4 stars	36	The Boyz	"Bloom Bloom"	K	Wake One Entertainment	Cha Woong-ki	3/4 stars	1/4 stars
16	Golden Child	"DamDaDi" (담다디)	K	Woollim Entertainment	Jang Min-seo	1/4 stars	0/4 stars	36	The Boyz	"Bloom Bloom"	K	Wake One Entertainment	Oh Sung-min	3/4 stars	2/4 stars
16	Golden Child	"DamDaDi" (담다디)	K	Woollim Entertainment	Jung Se-yun	1/4 stars	0/4 stars	37	Moonbin & Sanha	"Who"	K	TOP Media	Lee Dong-yeol	3/4 stars	2/4 stars
17	Kai	"Mmmh"	K	FNC Entertainment	Choi Ji-ho	3/4 stars	2/4 stars	37	Moonbin & Sanha	"Who"	K	TOP Media	Lee Hwan-hee	3/4 stars	3/4 stars
17	Kai	"Mmmh"	K	FNC Entertainment	Choi Ji-ho	3/4 stars	2/4 stars	38	Zico	"Freak" (괴짜)	K	H1ghr Music	Han Seo-bin	4/4 stars	4/4 stars
18	TXT	"Crown" (어느 날 머리에서 뿔이 자랐다)	G	Aichi, Japan	Osuke	2/4 stars	1/4 stars	38	Zico	"Freak" (괴짜)	K	H1ghr Music	Park Ji-hoo	4/4 stars	4/4 stars
18	TXT	"Crown" (어느 날 머리에서 뿔이 자랐다)	G	Aichi, Japan	Yuki	2/4 stars	0/4 stars	39	NewJeans	"Attention"	K	FirstOne Entertainment	Jang Ji-ho	2/4 stars	2/4 stars
19	Jay Park	"All I Wanna Do" (feat. Hoody and Loco) (Note: Seok Matthew performed the Korean version of the song.)	G	Canada	Seok Matthew	3/4 stars	3/4 stars	39	NewJeans	"Attention"	K	FirstOne Entertainment	Seo Won	3/4 stars	3/4 stars
19	Jay Park	"All I Wanna Do" (feat. Hoody and Loco)	G	Canada	Seok Matthew	3/4 stars	3/4 stars	40	Unknown		K	Rain Company	Yeom Tae-gyun	4/4 stars	2/4 stars
20	ONF	"Beautiful Beautiful"	K	Studio Gl1de	Sung Han-bin	3/4 stars	3/4 stars	40	Unknown		K	Rain Company	Yeom Tae-gyun	4/4 stars	2/4 stars
21	Pentagon	"Shine" (빛나리)	G	Tokyo, Japan	Ichika	1/4 stars	1/4 stars								
21	Pentagon	"Shine" (빛나리)	G	Tokyo, Japan	Itsuki	2/4 stars	0/4 stars								
21	Pentagon	"Shine" (빛나리)	G	Tokyo, Japan	Ouju	3/4 stars	0/4 stars								
21	Pentagon	"Shine" (빛나리)	G	Tokyo, Japan	Hyo (Note: Hyo, Toui, and Yutaka were originally scheduled to perform "Shine" by Pentagon with Ichika, Itsuki, and Ouju. Although they appear in the practice video, they were absent from the final recording for unknown reasons.)	N/A	0/4 stars								
21	Pentagon	"Shine" (빛나리)	G	Tokyo, Japan	Toui	N/A	0/4 stars								
21	Pentagon	"Shine" (빛나리)	G	Tokyo, Japan	Yutaka	N/A	0/4 stars								

== Signal Song Test (Episode 2–3) ==
Key

Same position	star level maintained
▲	star level upgraded
▼	star level downgraded

The top row indicates the initial level assigned after the Star Level Test, while the first column indicates the new level after the re-assessment.

Signal Song Test (2nd evaluation results)
Before After		All star	3 star	2 star	1 star	No star
All star	K	Kum Jun-hyeon; Lee Ye-dam; Park Han-bin	Kim Tae-rae ▲; Mun Jung-hyun ▲; Park Gun-wook ▲; Seo Won ▲; Sung Han-bin ▲	—N/a		
All star	G	Haruto; Jay; Keita; Zhang Hao	Seok Matthew ▲; Wang Zihao ▲	—N/a		
3 star	K	Han Seo-bin ▼; Han Yu-jin ▼; Ji Yun-seo ▼; Kim Gyu-vin ▼; Kim Min-seoung ▼; Lee Hoe-taek ▼; Park Ji-hoo ▼; Yoo Seung-eon ▼	Hong Keon-hee; Kim Ji-woong; Lee Jeong-hyeon; Park Hyun-been	~~Jung Hwan-rok~~ ▲; Kim Min-hyuk ▲; Lee Seung-hwan ▲; Oh Sung-min ▲; ~~Yeom Tae-gyun~~ ▲	—N/a	—N/a
3 star	G	Chen Kuanjui ▼	Anthonny; Min; Na Kamden	Dang Hong Hai ▲; Wumuti ▲	Cong ▲	—N/a
2 star	K	—N/a	Han Yu-seop ▼; Jang Yeo-jun ▼	Choi Ji-ho; Jang Ji-ho; Jeong I-chan; Park Gwan-young	Cha Woong-ki ▲; Lee Dong-gun ▲	Jeon Woo-seok ▲
2 star	G	—N/a	Ricky ▼	Feng Junlan; Haru; Hiroto; Kei; Krystian; Yuto	Osuke ▲; Riku ▲	Hyo ▲; Itsuki ▲; Ouju ▲
1 star	K	—N/a	Choi Woo-jin ▼; Lee Hwan-hee ▼; Yoon Jong-woo ▼	Jeon Ho-young ▼; Lee Dong-yeol ▼; Lim Jun-seo ▼; Park Min-seok ▼	Jung Ho-jin	~~Jang Min-seo~~ ▲
1 star	G	—N/a	Brian ▼	Chen Renyou ▼; Qiu Shengyang ▼	Chen Jianyu; Chen Yugeng; Dong Dong; Winnie; Xuan Hao; Zhang Shuaibo	Takuto ▲; Toui ▲; Yuki ▲; Yutaka ▲
No star	K	—N/a	—N/a	Lee Da-eul ▼	Choi Seung-hun ▼	Bak Do-ha; Jung Min-gyu; Jung Se-yun
No star	G	—N/a	Ollie ▼	Chen Liang ▼; Ma Jingxiang ▼	Ichika ▼; Lin Shiyuan ▼; Wen Yechen ▼	Cai Jinxin; Nice; Wang Yanhong; Yang Jun

== K vs G Group Battle (Episode 3–4) ==
Color key

Winning Team
Leader
Killing Part
Leader and Killing Part

Bold denotes the contestant who picked the team members.

All members of the winning team from each battle will receive a benefit of 100,000 points. In addition, because K-Group won the group battle with an overall score of 3,615 points, the Korean contestants will receive an additional 10,000 points to their cumulative rank points for the first ranking announcement.

With 222 points, "Back Door" K-Team received the most points out of the 14 teams and got to perform on M Countdown on March 2, 2023. In addition, they filmed a performance video and further PR content that was posted on the Studio Choom YouTube channel on March 1.

K vs G Group Battle results
Performance			K-Group				G-Group			
Performance			Team	Points	Contestants		Team	Points	Contestants	
#	Original artist(s)	Song	Team	Points	Position	Name	Team	Points	Position	Name
1	Seventeen	"Very Nice" (아주 NICE)	530	248	Main Vocal	Yoo Seung-eon	242	30	Main Vocal	Cong
1	Seventeen	"Very Nice" (아주 NICE)	530	29	Sub Vocal 1	Mun Jung-hyun	242	3	Sub Vocal 1	Ichika
1	Seventeen	"Very Nice" (아주 NICE)	530	76	Sub Vocal 2	Seo Won	242	19	Sub Vocal 2	Ouju
1	Seventeen	"Very Nice" (아주 NICE)	530	79	Sub Vocal 3	**Cha Woong-ki**	242	21	Sub Vocal 3	Wen Yechen
1	Seventeen	"Very Nice" (아주 NICE)	530	10	Main Rapper	Jang Ji-ho	242	87	Main Rapper	Ma Jingxiang
1	Seventeen	"Very Nice" (아주 NICE)	530	49	Sub Rapper 1	Lee Dong-yeol	242	30	Sub Rapper 1	Yuki
1	Seventeen	"Very Nice" (아주 NICE)	530	39	Sub Rapper 2	Jung Min-gyu	242	53	Sub Rapper 2	**Hiroto**
2	Blackpink	"Kill This Love"	355	91	Main Vocal	**Lee Hwan-hee**	586	197	Main Vocal	Zhang Hao
2	Blackpink	"Kill This Love"	355	5	Sub Vocal 1	Han Yu-seop	586	72	Sub Vocal 1	Wang Zihao
2	Blackpink	"Kill This Love"	355	42	Sub Vocal 2	Jang Yeo-jun	586	121	Sub Vocal 2	Seok Matthew
2	Blackpink	"Kill This Love"	355	60	Main Rapper	Hong Keon-hee	586	151	Main Rapper	**Keita**
2	Blackpink	"Kill This Love"	355	158	Sub Rapper 1	Park Gun-wook	586	33	Sub Rapper 1	Chen Kuanjui
2	Blackpink	"Kill This Love"	355				586	12	Sub Rapper 2	Min
3	Wanna One	"Burn It Up" (활활)	517	142	Main Vocal	Park Gwan-young	325	74	Main Vocal	Chen Renyou
3	Wanna One	"Burn It Up" (활활)	517	160	Sub Vocal 1	Park Min-seok	325	28	Sub Vocal 1	**Yutaka**
3	Wanna One	"Burn It Up" (활활)	517	122	Sub Vocal 2	Jung Ho-jin	325	6	Sub Vocal 2	Riku
3	Wanna One	"Burn It Up" (활활)	517	N/A	Sub Vocal 3	~~Jung Hwan-rok~~	325	0	Sub Vocal 3	Qiu Shengyang
3	Wanna One	"Burn It Up" (활활)	517	41	Main Rapper	Jeon Ho-young	325	57	Main Rapper	Kei
3	Wanna One	"Burn It Up" (활활)	517	27	Sub Rapper 1	Jung Se-yun	325	46	Sub Rapper 1	Hyo
3	Wanna One	"Burn It Up" (활활)	517	26	Sub Rapper 2	Choi Seung-hun	325	115	Sub Rapper 2	Xuan Hao
4	BTS	"Danger"	486	29	Main Vocal	Jeong I-chan	286	27	Main Vocal	Yang Jun
4	BTS	"Danger"	486	N/A	Sub Vocal 1	Jeon Woo-seok	286	N/A	Sub Vocal 1	Itsuki
4	BTS	"Danger"	486	32	Sub Vocal 2	Lim Jun-seo	286	71	Sub Vocal 2	Chen Yugeng
4	BTS	"Danger"	486	N/A	Main Rapper	Choi Ji-ho	286	N/A	Main Rapper	Dong Dong
4	BTS	"Danger"	486	50	Sub Rapper 1	**Lee Da-eul**	286	82	Sub Rapper 1	Yuto
4	BTS	"Danger"	486	149	Sub Rapper 2	Lee Seung-hwan	286	22	Sub Rapper 2	Wang Yanhong
4	BTS	"Danger"	486	N/A	Sub Rapper 3	Kim Min-hyuk	286	N/A	Sub Rapper 3	Takuto
5	Stray Kids	"Back Door"	554	8	Main Vocal	Ji Yun-seo	205	6	Main Vocal	Feng Junlan
5	Stray Kids	"Back Door"	554	63	Sub Vocal 1	Kim Tae-rae	205	80	Sub Vocal 1	**Ricky**
5	Stray Kids	"Back Door"	554	122	Sub Vocal 2	Han Yu-jin	205	26	Sub Vocal 2	Brian
5	Stray Kids	"Back Door"	554	28	Main Rapper	Kim Min-seoung	205	27	Main Rapper	Chen Jianyu
5	Stray Kids	"Back Door"	554	21	Sub Rapper 1	Kum Jun-hyeon	205	8	Sub Rapper 1	Krystian
5	Stray Kids	"Back Door"	554	50	Sub Rapper 2	Yoon Jong-woo	205	38	Sub Rapper 2	Zhang Shuaibo
5	Stray Kids	"Back Door"	554	259	Sub Rapper 3	**Kim Ji-woong**	205	19	Sub Rapper 3	Na Kamden
6	NCT Dream	"Hot Sauce" (맛)	617	56	Main Vocal	**Lee Dong-gun**	233	10	Main Vocal	Toui
6	NCT Dream	"Hot Sauce" (맛)	617	253	Sub Vocal 1	Park Han-bin	233	60	Sub Vocal 1	Ollie
6	NCT Dream	"Hot Sauce" (맛)	617	30	Sub Vocal 2	Choi Woo-jin	233	6	Sub Vocal 2	**Nice**
6	NCT Dream	"Hot Sauce" (맛)	617	N/A	Sub Vocal 3	~~Jang Min-seo~~	233	10	Sub Vocal 3	Chen Liang
6	NCT Dream	"Hot Sauce" (맛)	617	107	Main Rapper	Park Hyun-been	233	12	Main Rapper	Lin Shiyuan
6	NCT Dream	"Hot Sauce" (맛)	617	29	Sub Rapper 1	Bak Do-ha	233	54	Sub Rapper 1	Cai Jinxin
6	NCT Dream	"Hot Sauce" (맛)	617	143	Sub Rapper 2	Park Ji-hoo	233	81	Sub Rapper 2	Osuke
7	Exo	"Love Me Right"	557	161	Main Vocal	**Lee Hoe-taek**	206	66	Main Vocal	Jay
7	Exo	"Love Me Right"	557	13	Sub Vocal 1	Lee Ye-dam	206	32	Sub Vocal 1	Anthonny
7	Exo	"Love Me Right"	557	138	Sub Vocal 2	Sung Han-bin	206	29	Sub Vocal 2	**Dang Hong Hai**
7	Exo	"Love Me Right"	557	82	Sub Vocal 3	Oh Sung-min	206	32	Sub Vocal 3	Wumuti
7	Exo	"Love Me Right"	557	100	Sub Vocal 4	Kim Gyu-vin	206	10	Sub Vocal 4	Haru
7	Exo	"Love Me Right"	557	17	Main Rapper	Han Seo-bin	206	12	Main Rapper	Winnie
7	Exo	"Love Me Right"	557	46	Sub Rapper 1	Lee Jeong-hyeon	206	25	Sub Rapper 1	Haruto

== Dual Position Battle (Episode 6–7) ==
Color key

Winning Team
Leader
Killing Part
Leader and Killing Part

For the Dual Position Battle, each contestant chose a song. However, trainees with a higher rank were allowed to remove lower-ranked trainees from a team once it had hit its capacity to free up a spot for themselves. The contestants that had been kicked out from a group then needed to join another song.

Each member of the team that scored highest in its respective category received a benefit of 100,000 points. Furthermore, Zhang Hao, Kim Gyu-vin, and Park Han-bin received an additional 150,000 points to their cumulative rank points for the second ranking announcement as they scored the highest within their winning team. The three winning teams, "Tomboy", "Love Killa", and "LAW", performed on M Countdown on March 23 and received a promotional banner on the Mnet Plus app.

Dual Position Battle results
Performance			Team		Result		Contestants	
#	Original artist(s)	Song	Name	Points	Rank	Points	Position	Name
Vocal & Rap
12	(G)I-dle	"Tomboy"	ACES	860	Undisclosed		Sub Rapper 2 Sub Vocal 2	Sung Han-bin
12	(G)I-dle	"Tomboy"	ACES	860	1	849	Sub Rapper 1 Sub Vocal 1	Zhang Hao
12	(G)I-dle	"Tomboy"	ACES	860	Undisclosed		Main Vocal; Sub Rapper 3	Lee Hoe-taek
12	(G)I-dle	"Tomboy"	ACES	860	Undisclosed		Main Rapper; Sub Vocal 3	Park Gun-wook
8	Be'O	"Limousine" (리무진)	999	719	Undisclosed		Main Vocal; Sub Rapper 2	Anthonny
8	Be'O	"Limousine" (리무진)	999	719	Undisclosed		Sub Vocal 1 Sub Rapper 1	Krystian
8	Be'O	"Limousine" (리무진)	999	719	1	795	Main Rapper; Sub Vocal 2	Park Ji-hoo
6	Infinite	"Man In Love" (남자가 사랑할때)	소년시대 (Boys' Generation)	752	1	740	Main Vocal; Sub Rapper 3	Kim Tae-rae
6	Infinite	"Man In Love" (남자가 사랑할때)	소년시대 (Boys' Generation)	752	Undisclosed		Sub Rapper 1 Sub Vocal 2	Jung Min-gyu
6	Infinite	"Man In Love" (남자가 사랑할때)	소년시대 (Boys' Generation)	752	Undisclosed		Sub Vocal 1 Sub Rapper 2	Lee Dong-yeol
6	Infinite	"Man In Love" (남자가 사랑할때)	소년시대 (Boys' Generation)	752	Undisclosed		Main Rapper; Sub Vocal 3	Choi Woo-jin
10	High4	"Not Spring, Love, or Cherry Blossoms (with IU)" (봄 사랑 벚꽃 말고)	사랑학개론 (Love 101)	617	3	387	Sub Vocal 1 Sub Rapper 1	Lee Da-eul
10	High4	"Not Spring, Love, or Cherry Blossoms (with IU)" (봄 사랑 벚꽃 말고)	사랑학개론 (Love 101)	617	Undisclosed		Main Rapper; Sub Vocal 2	Bak Do-ha
10	High4	"Not Spring, Love, or Cherry Blossoms (with IU)" (봄 사랑 벚꽃 말고)	사랑학개론 (Love 101)	617	1	730	Main Vocal; Sub Rapper 3	Jeong I-chan
Vocal & Dance
11	BTS	"Butterfly"	나비 나 (NABI NA)	664	1	696	Main Dancer; Sub Vocal 3	Chen Kuanjui
11	BTS	"Butterfly"	나비 나 (NABI NA)	664	4	491	Sub Vocal 2 Sub Dancer 2	Lim Jun-seo
11	BTS	"Butterfly"	나비 나 (NABI NA)	664	Undisclosed		Main Vocal; Sub Dancer 1	Cong
11	BTS	"Butterfly"	나비 나 (NABI NA)	664	Undisclosed		Sub Vocal 1 Sub Dancer 3	Brian
9	Twice	"Feel Special"	A정식 (A Course)	677	Undisclosed		Main Vocal; Sub Dancer 2	Cha Woong-ki
9	Twice	"Feel Special"	A정식 (A Course)	677	1	703	Sub Dancer 1 Sub Vocal 3	Zhang Shuaibo
9	Twice	"Feel Special"	A정식 (A Course)	677	Undisclosed		Main Dancer; Sub Vocal 1	Lee Dong-gun
9	Twice	"Feel Special"	A정식 (A Course)	677	Undisclosed		Sub Vocal 2 Sub Dancer 3	Cai Jinxin
4	Monsta X	"Love Killa"	D킬라 (DKilla)	840	Undisclosed		Main Vocal; Sub Dancer 2	Seok Matthew
4	Monsta X	"Love Killa"	D킬라 (DKilla)	840	Undisclosed		Sub Vocal 2 Sub Dancer 3	Kim Ji-woong
4	Monsta X	"Love Killa"	D킬라 (DKilla)	840	1	758	Main Dancer; Sub Vocal 3	Kim Gyu-vin
4	Monsta X	"Love Killa"	D킬라 (DKilla)	840	Undisclosed		Sub Vocal 1 Sub Dancer 1	Seo Won
3	Seventeen	"Home"	하얀 집 (White House)	716	Undisclosed		Main Vocal; Sub Dancer 4	Jay
3	Seventeen	"Home"	하얀 집 (White House)	716	Undisclosed		Sub Vocal 1 Sub Dancer 3	Yoo Seung-eon
3	Seventeen	"Home"	하얀 집 (White House)	716	5	580	Sub Vocal 3 Sub Dancer 1	Dang Hong Hai
3	Seventeen	"Home"	하얀 집 (White House)	716	1	660	Main Dancer; Sub Vocal 4	Yoon Jong-woo
3	Seventeen	"Home"	하얀 집 (White House)	716	Undisclosed		Sub Vocal 2 Sub Dancer 2	Ji Yun-seo
Rap & Dance
1	H1ghr Music	"Gang" (Note: Remix made by Jay Park, HAON, pH-1 and Sik-K of the song of the same name by Rain.) (깡)	한국 다람쥐 (Korean Chipmunk)	798	Undisclosed		Main Dancer; Sub Rapper 3	Kum Jun-hyeon
1	H1ghr Music	"Gang" (깡)	한국 다람쥐 (Korean Chipmunk)	798	1	700	Sub Dancer 1 Sub Rapper 2	Lee Seung-hwan
1	H1ghr Music	"Gang" (깡)	한국 다람쥐 (Korean Chipmunk)	798	Undisclosed		Sub Rapper 1 Sub Dancer 3	Mun Jung-hyun
1	H1ghr Music	"Gang" (깡)	한국 다람쥐 (Korean Chipmunk)	798	Undisclosed		Main Rapper; Sub Dancer 4	Lee Jeong-hyeon
1	H1ghr Music	"Gang" (깡)	한국 다람쥐 (Korean Chipmunk)	798	Undisclosed		Sub Rapper 4 Sub Dancer 2	Chen Jianyu
7	Crush	"Rush Hour (feat. J-Hope)"	어썸아워 (Awesome Hour)	742	1	757	Main Rapper; Main Dancer	Ricky
7	Crush	"Rush Hour (feat. J-Hope)"	어썸아워 (Awesome Hour)	742	5	569	Sub Rapper 2 Sub Dancer 3	Takuto
7	Crush	"Rush Hour (feat. J-Hope)"	어썸아워 (Awesome Hour)	742	Undisclosed		Sub Dancer 2 Sub Rapper 3	Hiroto
7	Crush	"Rush Hour (feat. J-Hope)"	어썸아워 (Awesome Hour)	742	Undisclosed		Sub Rapper 1 Sub Dancer 4	Ma Jingxiang
7	Crush	"Rush Hour (feat. J-Hope)"	어썸아워 (Awesome Hour)	742	Undisclosed		Sub Dancer 1 Sub Rapper 4	Oh Sung-min
5	Yoon Mi-rae	"LAW (feat. BIBI)"	수오전사 (Five Guardians)	849	Undisclosed		Sub Rapper 2 Sub Dancer 4	Han Yu-jin
5	Yoon Mi-rae	"LAW (feat. BIBI)"	수오전사 (Five Guardians)	849	1	757	Main Rapper; Sub Dancer 2	Park Han-bin
5	Yoon Mi-rae	"LAW (feat. BIBI)"	수오전사 (Five Guardians)	849	Undisclosed		Sub Dancer 3 Sub Rapper 4	Wang Zihao
5	Yoon Mi-rae	"LAW (feat. BIBI)"	수오전사 (Five Guardians)	849	Undisclosed		Main Dancer; Sub Rapper 1	Na Kamden
5	Yoon Mi-rae	"LAW (feat. BIBI)"	수오전사 (Five Guardians)	849	5	608	Sub Dancer 1 Sub Rapper 3	Lee Ye-dam
2	Jessi	"ZOOM"	사랑해ZOOM♥ (ZOOM in on love♥️)	813	1	736	Main Rapper; Sub Dancer 4	Keita
2	Jessi	"ZOOM"	사랑해ZOOM♥ (ZOOM in on love♥️)	813	Undisclosed		Main Dancer; Sub Rapper 1	Haruto
2	Jessi	"ZOOM"	사랑해ZOOM♥ (ZOOM in on love♥️)	813	Undisclosed		Sub Rapper 3 Sub Dancer 1	Ollie
2	Jessi	"ZOOM"	사랑해ZOOM♥ (ZOOM in on love♥️)	813	Undisclosed		Sub Rapper 2 Sub Dancer 3	Wumuti
2	Jessi	"ZOOM"	사랑해ZOOM♥ (ZOOM in on love♥️)	813	5	656	Sub Rapper 4 Sub Dancer 2	Park Hyun-been

== Artist Battle (Episode 9–10) ==
The Artist Battle songs were revealed at the start of Episode 8. Viewers voted on the Mnet Plus app who they wanted to perform the five songs that were showcased. Voting closed on March 10 at 10:00 (KST).

Each member of the "Over Me" team received a benefit of 200,000 points as they placed first. Additionally, Zhang Hao received another 200,000 points to his cumulative rank points for the third ranking announcement because he ranked first within the team. The entire group performed a special stage on M Countdown and held a mini fan meeting titled Planet Night Date: OVER ME (Korean: 플래닛 심야 데이트: OVER ME) on April 12, 2023.

Color key

Winning Team
Leader
Killing Part
Leader and Killing Part

Artist Battle results
Performance				Team		Result		Contestant	
#	Genre	Song	Production credit (Note: Some contestants participated in the rap making and choreography production.)	Name	Points	Rank	Points	Position	Name
1	Sentimental hip hop	"SuperCharger"	Lyrics & Composition: David Amber, August Rigo, Skylar Mones, danke; Choreography: nino; Rap making: Ollie, Takuto, Cha Woong-ki	나인티식스 (NINTYSIX)	470	Undisclosed		Main Vocal	Seo Won
1	Sentimental hip hop	"SuperCharger"	Lyrics & Composition: David Amber, August Rigo, Skylar Mones, danke; Choreography: nino; Rap making: Ollie, Takuto, Cha Woong-ki	나인티식스 (NINTYSIX)	470	1	852	Sub Vocal 1	Haruto
1	Sentimental hip hop	"SuperCharger"	Lyrics & Composition: David Amber, August Rigo, Skylar Mones, danke; Choreography: nino; Rap making: Ollie, Takuto, Cha Woong-ki	나인티식스 (NINTYSIX)	470	Undisclosed		Main Rapper	Cha Woong-ki
1	Sentimental hip hop	"SuperCharger"	Lyrics & Composition: David Amber, August Rigo, Skylar Mones, danke; Choreography: nino; Rap making: Ollie, Takuto, Cha Woong-ki	나인티식스 (NINTYSIX)	470	Undisclosed		Sub Rapper 1	Wang Zihao
1	Sentimental hip hop	"SuperCharger"	Lyrics & Composition: David Amber, August Rigo, Skylar Mones, danke; Choreography: nino; Rap making: Ollie, Takuto, Cha Woong-ki	나인티식스 (NINTYSIX)	470	Undisclosed		Sub Rapper 2	Ollie
1	Sentimental hip hop	"SuperCharger"	Lyrics & Composition: David Amber, August Rigo, Skylar Mones, danke; Choreography: nino; Rap making: Ollie, Takuto, Cha Woong-ki	나인티식스 (NINTYSIX)	470	6	448	Sub Rapper 3	Takuto
2	Funk pop	"En Garde" (준비, 시작!)	Lyrics & Composition: NATHAN, Daily, Ronnie Icon, KZ, ONE.KI, Rico Greene, Likey, yunji; Choreography: Choi Young-joon; Rap making: Park Gun-wook, Kim Gyu-vin	앙 버터 (En Butter)	597	Undisclosed		Main Vocal	Lee Hoe-taek
2	Funk pop	"En Garde" (준비, 시작!)	Lyrics & Composition: NATHAN, Daily, Ronnie Icon, KZ, ONE.KI, Rico Greene, Likey, yunji; Choreography: Choi Young-joon; Rap making: Park Gun-wook, Kim Gyu-vin	앙 버터 (En Butter)	597	Undisclosed		Sub Vocal 1	Lee Seung-hwan
2	Funk pop	"En Garde" (준비, 시작!)	Lyrics & Composition: NATHAN, Daily, Ronnie Icon, KZ, ONE.KI, Rico Greene, Likey, yunji; Choreography: Choi Young-joon; Rap making: Park Gun-wook, Kim Gyu-vin	앙 버터 (En Butter)	597	Undisclosed		Sub Vocal 2	Kum Jun-hyeon
2	Funk pop	"En Garde" (준비, 시작!)	Lyrics & Composition: NATHAN, Daily, Ronnie Icon, KZ, ONE.KI, Rico Greene, Likey, yunji; Choreography: Choi Young-joon; Rap making: Park Gun-wook, Kim Gyu-vin	앙 버터 (En Butter)	597	Undisclosed		Sub Vocal 3	Park Gun-wook
2	Funk pop	"En Garde" (준비, 시작!)	Lyrics & Composition: NATHAN, Daily, Ronnie Icon, KZ, ONE.KI, Rico Greene, Likey, yunji; Choreography: Choi Young-joon; Rap making: Park Gun-wook, Kim Gyu-vin	앙 버터 (En Butter)	597	1	748	Main Rapper	Kim Gyu-vin
2	Funk pop	"En Garde" (준비, 시작!)	Lyrics & Composition: NATHAN, Daily, Ronnie Icon, KZ, ONE.KI, Rico Greene, Likey, yunji; Choreography: Choi Young-joon; Rap making: Park Gun-wook, Kim Gyu-vin	앙 버터 (En Butter)	597	Undisclosed		Sub Rapper 1	Hiroto
3	Oriental pop	"Switch"	Lyrics & Composition: QSTNMRKS, Vince Nantes, Yuki, On Sam-wol (MUMW); Choreography: zdae.	꾹꾹이 (Gguggugi)	432	Undisclosed		Main Vocal	Kim Tae-rae
3	Oriental pop	"Switch"	Lyrics & Composition: QSTNMRKS, Vince Nantes, Yuki, On Sam-wol (MUMW); Choreography: zdae.	꾹꾹이 (Gguggugi)	432	1	741	Sub Vocal 1	Park Han-bin
3	Oriental pop	"Switch"	Lyrics & Composition: QSTNMRKS, Vince Nantes, Yuki, On Sam-wol (MUMW); Choreography: zdae.	꾹꾹이 (Gguggugi)	432	Undisclosed		Main Rapper	Na Kamden
3	Oriental pop	"Switch"	Lyrics & Composition: QSTNMRKS, Vince Nantes, Yuki, On Sam-wol (MUMW); Choreography: zdae.	꾹꾹이 (Gguggugi)	432	Undisclosed		Sub Rapper 1	Yoon Jong-woo
3	Oriental pop	"Switch"	Lyrics & Composition: QSTNMRKS, Vince Nantes, Yuki, On Sam-wol (MUMW); Choreography: zdae.	꾹꾹이 (Gguggugi)	432	6	402	Sub Rapper 2	Zhang Shuaibo
3	Oriental pop	"Switch"	Lyrics & Composition: QSTNMRKS, Vince Nantes, Yuki, On Sam-wol (MUMW); Choreography: zdae.	꾹꾹이 (Gguggugi)	432	Undisclosed		Sub Rapper 3	Keita
4	Newtro synthpop	"Say My Name"	Lyrics & Composition: FLUM3N, Boran, IRIS, Son Da-seul (MUMW); Choreography: s.hyun; Rap making: Han Yu-jin	Say Yes!	612	1	826	Main Vocal	Sung Han-bin
4	Newtro synthpop	"Say My Name"	Lyrics & Composition: FLUM3N, Boran, IRIS, Son Da-seul (MUMW); Choreography: s.hyun; Rap making: Han Yu-jin	Say Yes!	612	Undisclosed		Sub Vocal 1	Yoo Seung-eon
4	Newtro synthpop	"Say My Name"	Lyrics & Composition: FLUM3N, Boran, IRIS, Son Da-seul (MUMW); Choreography: s.hyun; Rap making: Han Yu-jin	Say Yes!	612	Undisclosed		Sub Vocal 2	Seok Matthew
4	Newtro synthpop	"Say My Name"	Lyrics & Composition: FLUM3N, Boran, IRIS, Son Da-seul (MUMW); Choreography: s.hyun; Rap making: Han Yu-jin	Say Yes!	612	Undisclosed		Main Rapper	Kim Ji-woong
4	Newtro synthpop	"Say My Name"	Lyrics & Composition: FLUM3N, Boran, IRIS, Son Da-seul (MUMW); Choreography: s.hyun; Rap making: Han Yu-jin	Say Yes!	612	Undisclosed		Sub Rapper 1	Han Yu-jin
5	R&B pop	"Over Me"	Lyrics & Composition: DINT (HIGHBRID), T-lack (HIGHBRID), Hertz (HIGHBRID), OSKAR (HIGHBRID), Cho Yu-ri, Kim Hye-jeong (makeumine works), Lee Mi-so; Choreography: bengal, Zhang Hao, Chen Kuanjui; Rap making: Lee Jeong-hyeon	Overdose	621	5	485	Main Vocal	Jay
5	R&B pop	"Over Me"	Lyrics & Composition: DINT (HIGHBRID), T-lack (HIGHBRID), Hertz (HIGHBRID), OSKAR (HIGHBRID), Cho Yu-ri, Kim Hye-jeong (makeumine works), Lee Mi-so; Choreography: bengal, Zhang Hao, Chen Kuanjui; Rap making: Lee Jeong-hyeon	Overdose	621	Undisclosed		Sub Vocal 1	Ricky
5	R&B pop	"Over Me"	Lyrics & Composition: DINT (HIGHBRID), T-lack (HIGHBRID), Hertz (HIGHBRID), OSKAR (HIGHBRID), Cho Yu-ri, Kim Hye-jeong (makeumine works), Lee Mi-so; Choreography: bengal, Zhang Hao, Chen Kuanjui; Rap making: Lee Jeong-hyeon	Overdose	621	Undisclosed		Sub Vocal 2	Lee Jeong-hyeon
5	R&B pop	"Over Me"	Lyrics & Composition: DINT (HIGHBRID), T-lack (HIGHBRID), Hertz (HIGHBRID), OSKAR (HIGHBRID), Cho Yu-ri, Kim Hye-jeong (makeumine works), Lee Mi-so; Choreography: bengal, Zhang Hao, Chen Kuanjui; Rap making: Lee Jeong-hyeon	Overdose	621	1	852	Sub Vocal 3	Zhang Hao
5	R&B pop	"Over Me"	Lyrics & Composition: DINT (HIGHBRID), T-lack (HIGHBRID), Hertz (HIGHBRID), OSKAR (HIGHBRID), Cho Yu-ri, Kim Hye-jeong (makeumine works), Lee Mi-so; Choreography: bengal, Zhang Hao, Chen Kuanjui; Rap making: Lee Jeong-hyeon	Overdose	621	Undisclosed		Sub Vocal 4	Chen Kuanjui

== Final TOP9 Battle (Episode 12) ==
The Final TOP9 Battle songs were revealed in the latter part of Episode 11.

Viewers voted for the trainees they thought suited the killing part of the two songs best by liking their video on the official Mnet K-Pop YouTube channel. The final number of likes was multiplied by 100, added to the number of views, and converted into score points, which determined the killing parts for the Final TOP9 Battle.

Color key

Leader
Killing Part

Final TOP9 Battle results
Performance			Contestant	
#	Producer	Song	Position	Name
1	Composition: Im Sooho, Naasim, Dr. Han, Chris Wahle, Ryan Lawrie; Lyrics: Kim Anna (ARTiffect); Choreography: z.dae	"Jelly Pop"	Main Vocal	Lee Hoe-taek
1	Composition: Im Sooho, Naasim, Dr. Han, Chris Wahle, Ryan Lawrie; Lyrics: Kim Anna (ARTiffect); Choreography: z.dae	"Jelly Pop"	Sub Vocal 1	Yoo Seung-eon
1	Composition: Im Sooho, Naasim, Dr. Han, Chris Wahle, Ryan Lawrie; Lyrics: Kim Anna (ARTiffect); Choreography: z.dae	"Jelly Pop"	Sub Vocal 2	Zhang Hao
1	Composition: Im Sooho, Naasim, Dr. Han, Chris Wahle, Ryan Lawrie; Lyrics: Kim Anna (ARTiffect); Choreography: z.dae	"Jelly Pop"	Sub Vocal 3	Park Gun-wook
1	Composition: Im Sooho, Naasim, Dr. Han, Chris Wahle, Ryan Lawrie; Lyrics: Kim Anna (ARTiffect); Choreography: z.dae	"Jelly Pop"	Sub Vocal 4	Kum Jun-hyeon
1	Composition: Im Sooho, Naasim, Dr. Han, Chris Wahle, Ryan Lawrie; Lyrics: Kim Anna (ARTiffect); Choreography: z.dae	"Jelly Pop"	Sub Vocal 5	Park Han-bin
1	Composition: Im Sooho, Naasim, Dr. Han, Chris Wahle, Ryan Lawrie; Lyrics: Kim Anna (ARTiffect); Choreography: z.dae	"Jelly Pop"	Sub Vocal 6	Jay
1	Composition: Im Sooho, Naasim, Dr. Han, Chris Wahle, Ryan Lawrie; Lyrics: Kim Anna (ARTiffect); Choreography: z.dae	"Jelly Pop"	Main Rapper	Na Kamden
1	Composition: Im Sooho, Naasim, Dr. Han, Chris Wahle, Ryan Lawrie; Lyrics: Kim Anna (ARTiffect); Choreography: z.dae	"Jelly Pop"	Sub Rapper 1	Seok Matthew
2	Composition: Alawn, Andy Love; Lyrics: RUM (MUMW), DAON (MUMW), Andy Love, Alawn; Choreography: Baek Koo-young	"Hot Summer"	Main Vocal	Sung Han-bin
2	Composition: Alawn, Andy Love; Lyrics: RUM (MUMW), DAON (MUMW), Andy Love, Alawn; Choreography: Baek Koo-young	"Hot Summer"	Sub Vocal 1	Kim Tae-rae
2	Composition: Alawn, Andy Love; Lyrics: RUM (MUMW), DAON (MUMW), Andy Love, Alawn; Choreography: Baek Koo-young	"Hot Summer"	Sub Vocal 2	Kim Ji-woong
2	Composition: Alawn, Andy Love; Lyrics: RUM (MUMW), DAON (MUMW), Andy Love, Alawn; Choreography: Baek Koo-young	"Hot Summer"	Sub Vocal 3	Han Yu-jin
2	Composition: Alawn, Andy Love; Lyrics: RUM (MUMW), DAON (MUMW), Andy Love, Alawn; Choreography: Baek Koo-young	"Hot Summer"	Sub Vocal 4	Ricky
2	Composition: Alawn, Andy Love; Lyrics: RUM (MUMW), DAON (MUMW), Andy Love, Alawn; Choreography: Baek Koo-young	"Hot Summer"	Sub Vocal 5	Lee Jeong-hyeon
2	Composition: Alawn, Andy Love; Lyrics: RUM (MUMW), DAON (MUMW), Andy Love, Alawn; Choreography: Baek Koo-young	"Hot Summer"	Sub Vocal 6	Kim Gyu-vin
2	Composition: Alawn, Andy Love; Lyrics: RUM (MUMW), DAON (MUMW), Andy Love, Alawn; Choreography: Baek Koo-young	"Hot Summer"	Main Rapper	Keita
2	Composition: Alawn, Andy Love; Lyrics: RUM (MUMW), DAON (MUMW), Andy Love, Alawn; Choreography: Baek Koo-young	"Hot Summer"	Sub Rapper 1	Yoon Jong-woo
