= 成功 =

成功 is an Asian word meaning "success".

It may refer to:

- Chenggong, Taitung, township in Taitung, Taiwan
- Chenggong Station, railway station in Taichung, Taiwan
- National Cheng Kung University, university in Tainan, Taiwan
- Nguyễn Thành Công (원성공; 阮成功), South Korean singer from Vietnam in Boys Planet
- ROCS Cheng Kung (PFG2-1101), lead ship of eight Cheng Kung-class guided-missile frigates
- Seikō, 2009 single by Japanese rapper Kreva
- Zheng Chenggong (鄭成功; 1624–1662), Southern Ming general

== See also ==
- Chenggong (disambiguation)
