= Under Nineteen =

2018 South Korean television series

- Genre: Variety
- Written by: Jeong In-hwan; Ko Young-min
- Directed by: Jeong Chang-young; Lim Kyung-sik
- Presented by: Kim So-hyun
- Country of origin: South Korea
- Original language: Korean
- No. of seasons: 1
- No. of episodes: 14

Production
- Producers: Lim Kyung-sik; Jung Chang-won
- Running time: 90 minutes 120 minutes (Finale)
- Production companies: MBC; MBK Entertainment

Original release
- Network: MBC TV
- Release: November 3, 2018 – February 9, 2019

Under Nineteen (Korean: 언더나인틴) was a survival show on Munhwa Broadcasting Corporation for trainees under the age of 19 years old. There were a total of 57 contestants competing to debut as a member of 1THE9. The trainees were put into groups that specialized in vocals, rapping, and performance. The show aired between November 3, 2018 and February 9, 2019.

== Concept ==
Under Nineteen introduces singers, rappers, dancers and also trainees with the ability to produce music and choreograph. Fifty-seven aspiring boy band members will come to compete for a spot to be in a new K-pop idol group. Once down to the final nineteen trainees, only nine of them will have the chance of being the next idol group. The winning group will sign a contract for 12 months and be managed by MBK Entertainment.

== Directors ==
- Kim So-hyun - Host & Official Supporter of the group
- Dynamic Duo - Rap Director, Gaeko & Choiza
- Crush - Vocal Director
- Solji - Vocal Director, member of EXID
- Eunhyuk - Performance Director, member of Super Junior
- Hwang Sang-hoon - Performance Director, SM Entertainment Performance Director & Choreographer for Super Junior, SHINee, EXO & NCT.

=== Special director and guests ===
- Sunday
- Yesung
- Yunho
- Don Spike
- Jaehyo, P.O, U-Kwon
- Ravi, Ken
- Hani, LE
- Leeteuk
- Shindong
- Yerin
- J-Hope
- Kai

== Contestants ==
Color key (In order of contestant's rank on the show)

Top 9
Contestants eliminated in the final episode
Contestants eliminated in the fourth round of eliminations
Contestants eliminated in the third round of eliminations
Contestants eliminated in the second round of eliminations
Contestants eliminated in the first round of eliminations
Contestants who left the show

57 contestants
Jeon Do-yum (전도염)	Jung Jin-sung (정진성)	Kim Tae-woo (김태우)	Shin Ye-chan (신예찬)	Jeong Taek-hyeon (정택현)
Yoo Yong-ha (유용하)	Park Sung-won (박성원)	Lee Seung-hwan (이승환)	Kim Jun-seo (김준서)	Kim Shi-hyun (김시현)
Suren (수런)	Kim Young-won (김영원)	Lee Sang-min (이상민)	Song Byeong-hee (송병희)	Lee Ye-chan (이예찬)
Bae Hyeon-jun (배현준)	Lee Jong-won (이종원)	Park Si-young (박시영)	Wumuti (우무티)	Jeon Chan-bin (전찬빈)
Kim Sung-ho (김성호)	Kang Jun-hyuck (강준혁)	Yoon Tae-kyung (윤태경)	Ji Jin-seok (지진석)	Bang Jun-hyuk (방준혁)
Kim Jung-woo (김정우)	Park Jin-oh (박진오)	Kim Young-seok (김영석)	Shin Chan-bin (신찬빈)	Lim Youn-seo (임윤서)
Lee Dong-joon (이동준)	Song Jae-won (송재원)	Min (민)	Oh Da-han (오다한)	Lim Hyeong-bin ( 임형빈 )
Son Jin-ha ( 손진하)	Lee Jae-eok (이재억)	Kim Kun (김건)	Christian (크리스티안)	Choi Soo-min (최수민)
Koo Han-seo (구한서)	Kim Kang-min (김강민)	Kim Ye-joon (김예준)	Nam Do-hyon (남도현)	Eddie (에디)
Jang Rui (장루이)	Jeong Won-beom (정원범)	Jung Hyun-jun (정현준)	Kosuke (코스케)	Kim Bin (김빈)
Kim Jun-jae (김준재)	Yoon Do-yeon (윤도연)	Lee Min-woo (이민우)	Lee Jun-hwan (이준환)	Chang Min-su (장민수)
Jay Chang (제이창)	Choi Yong-hun (최용훈)			

== Rankings ==
The top 9 contestants were determined by online and onsite voting, the results of which were announced at the end of each episode. The top 9 contestants at the final vote determined the final group.

Color key

New Top 9

#	Episode 6	Episode 9	Episode 10	Jan 9	Episode 12	Episode 13	Jan 30	Episode 14
1	Wumuti	Wumuti =	Jung Jin-sung ↑10	Jung Jin-sung =	Jeon Do-yum ↑2	Jeon Do-yum =	Jeon Do-yum =	Jeon Do-yum =
2	Kim Shi-hyun	Kim Sung-ho ↑18	Choi Soo-min ↑1	Choi Soo-min =	Jung Jin-sung ↓1	Jung Jin-sung =	Jung Jin-sung =	Jung Jin-sung =
3	Jeon Do-yum	Choi Soo-min ↑5	Wumuti ↓2	Jeon Do-yum ↑4	Shin Ye-chan ↑2	Wumuti ↑8	Kim Tae-woo ↑3	Kim Tae-woo =
4	Jung Jin-sung	Yoon Tae-kyung ↑6	Shin Ye-chan ↑2	Wumuti ↓1	Lee Seung-hwan ↑4	Yoo Yong-ha ↑4	Shin Ye-chan ↑1	Shin Ye-chan =
5	Shin Ye-chan	Jeon Do-yum ↓2	Jeong Taek-hyeon ↑13	Shin Ye-chan ↓1	Bang Jun-hyuk ↑4	Shin Ye-chan ↓2	Yoo Yong-ha ↓1	Jeong Taek-hyeon ↑4
6	Suren	Shin Ye-chan ↓1	Park Sung-won ↑1	Jeong Taek-hyeon ↓1	Park Sung-won ↑1	Kim Tae-woo ↑6	Kim Shi-hyun ↑1	Yoo Yong-ha ↓1
7	Ji Jin-seok	Park Sung-won ↑30	Jeon Do-yum ↓2	Park Sung-won ↓1	Jeong Taek-hyeon ↓1	Kim Shi-hyun ↑6	Lee Seung-hwan ↑1	Park Sung-won ↑1
8	Choi Soo-min	Lee Sang-min ↑26	Kim Sung-ho ↓6	Lee Seung-hwan ↑1	Yoo Yong-ha ↑5	Lee Seung-hwan ↓4	Park Sung-won ↑2	Lee Seung-hwan ↓1
9	Bang Jun-hyuk	Ji Jin-seok ↓2	Lee Seung-hwan ↑3	Bang Jun-hyuk ↑1	Ji Jin-seok ↑3	Jeong Taek-hyeon ↓2	Jeong Taek-hyeon =	Kim Jun-seo ↑2

=== Result ===
During the last episode aired on February 9, 2019, Kim So-hyun and Leeteuk announced the unit boy band's name: 1THE9 (원더나인).

#	Episode 14 (Total votes)		
#	Name	Votes	Company
1	Jeon Do-yum	678,953	Play M Entertainment
2	Jung Jin-sung	500,929	Play M Entertainment
3	Kim Tae-woo	399,509	A Team Entertainment
4	Shin Ye-chan	390,005	TOP Media
5	Jung Taek-hyeon	377,883	Management Air
6	Yoo Yong-ha	347,424	OUI Entertainment
7	Park Sung-won	342,430	A Team Entertainment
8	Lee Seung-hwan	325,754	Play M Entertainment
9	Kim Jun-seo	321,288	OUI Entertainment

== Missions ==
=== Theme Song Mission (Episode 3–5) ===
#	Team	Song	Votes
1	Performance	"We Are Young"	253
2	Vocal	"Go Tomorrow"	201
3	Rap	"Friends"	185

=== Position Mission (Episode 6–8) ===
Color key

- Leader
- Former leader

#	Team	Group	Original artist	Song	Contestant	Votes	Total votes
1	Vocal	A	BTS	"I Need U"	Kang Jun-hyuck	214	455
1	Vocal	A	BTS	"I Need U"	Kim Jung-woo	214	455
1	Vocal	A	BTS	"I Need U"	Lim Hyeong-bin	214	455
1	Vocal	A	BTS	"I Need U"	Jeon Chan-bin	214	455
1	Vocal	A	BTS	"I Need U"	Jung Jin-sung	214	455
1	Vocal	A	BTS	"I Need U"	Ji Jin-seok	214	455
1	Vocal	B	EXO	"Love Me Right"	Kim Kun	241	455
1	Vocal	B	EXO	"Love Me Right"	Kim Young-seok	241	455
1	Vocal	B	EXO	"Love Me Right"	Kim Young-won	241	455
1	Vocal	B	EXO	"Love Me Right"	Kim Tae-woo	241	455
1	Vocal	B	EXO	"Love Me Right"	Bae Hyeon-jun	241	455
1	Vocal	B	EXO	"Love Me Right"	Shin Ye-chan	241	455
1	Vocal	B	EXO	"Love Me Right"	Yoon Tae-kyung	241	455
1	Vocal	B	EXO	"Love Me Right"	Lee Dong-joon	241	455
1	Vocal	B	EXO	"Love Me Right"	Lee Jae-eok	241	455
1	Vocal	B	EXO	"Love Me Right"	Lim Youn-seo	241	455
2	Performance	A	Block B	"H.E.R"	Kim Kang-min	223	450
2	Performance	A	Block B	"H.E.R"	Park Si-young	223	450
2	Performance	A	Block B	"H.E.R"	Song Byeong-hee	223	450
2	Performance	A	Block B	"H.E.R"	Song Jae-won	223	450
2	Performance	A	Block B	"H.E.R"	Suren	223	450
2	Performance	A	Block B	"H.E.R"	Shin Chan-bin	223	450
2	Performance	A	Block B	"H.E.R"	Eddie	223	450
2	Performance	A	Block B	"H.E.R"	Oh Da-han	223	450
2	Performance	A	Block B	"H.E.R"	Lee Seung-hwan	223	450
2	Performance	A	Block B	"H.E.R"	Christian	223	450
2	Performance	B	VIXX	"Shangri-La"	Kim Shi-hyun	227	450
2	Performance	B	VIXX	"Shangri-La"	Kim Jun-seo	227	450
2	Performance	B	VIXX	"Shangri-La"	Min	227	450
2	Performance	B	VIXX	"Shangri-La"	Son Jin-ha	227	450
2	Performance	B	VIXX	"Shangri-La"	Wumuti	227	450
2	Performance	B	VIXX	"Shangri-La"	Lee Jong-won	227	450
2	Performance	B	VIXX	"Shangri-La"	Jeon Do-yum	227	450
2	Performance	B	VIXX	"Shangri-La"	Jeong Won-beom	227	450
2	Performance	B	VIXX	"Shangri-La"	Kosuke	227	450
3	Rap	A	Block B	"H.E.R"	Kim Sung-ho	236	437
3	Rap	A	Block B	"H.E.R"	Park Sung-won	236	437
3	Rap	A	Block B	"H.E.R"	Bang Jun-hyuk	236	437
3	Rap	A	Block B	"H.E.R"	Jang Rui	236	437
3	Rap	A	Block B	"H.E.R"	Jung Hyun-jun	236	437
3	Rap	A	Block B	"H.E.R"	Choi Soo-min	236	437
3	Rap	B	NCT U	"Boss"	Koo Han-seo	201	437
3	Rap	B	NCT U	"Boss"	Kim Ye-joon	201	437
3	Rap	B	NCT U	"Boss"	Nam Do-hyon	201	437
3	Rap	B	NCT U	"Boss"	Park Jin-oh	201	437
3	Rap	B	NCT U	"Boss"	Yoo Yong-ha	201	437
3	Rap	B	NCT U	"Boss"	Lee Sang-min	201	437
3	Rap	B	NCT U	"Boss"	Lee Ye-chan	201	437
3	Rap	B	NCT U	"Boss"	Jeong Taek-hyeon	201	437

=== Shuffle Mission (Episode 10–11) ===
Color key

Leader

Round	Team	Original artist	Special director	Song	Contestant	Votes
1	1	TVXQ		"Mirotic"	Lee Seung-hwan	289
1	1	TVXQ		"Mirotic"	Wumuti	289
1	1	TVXQ		"Mirotic"	Kim Tae-woo	289
1	1	TVXQ		"Mirotic"	Song Byeong-hee	289
1	1	TVXQ		"Mirotic"	Yoo Yong-ha	289
1	1	TVXQ		"Mirotic"	Lee Dong-jun	289
1	2	BTS	J-Hope	"Fake Love"	Shin Ye-chan	373
1	2	BTS	J-Hope	"Fake Love"	Jeon Do-yum	373
1	2	BTS	J-Hope	"Fake Love"	Yoon Tae-kyung	373
1	2	BTS	J-Hope	"Fake Love"	Kim Jun-seo	373
1	2	BTS	J-Hope	"Fake Love"	Lim Hyeong-bin	373
1	2	BTS	J-Hope	"Fake Love"	Lee Sang-min	373
1	2	BTS	J-Hope	"Fake Love"	Kang Jun-hyuk	373
2	3	INFINITE		"Be Mine"	Kim Shi-hyun	335
2	3	INFINITE		"Be Mine"	Kim Young-seok	335
2	3	INFINITE		"Be Mine"	Bae Hyun-jun	335
2	3	INFINITE		"Be Mine"	Taek-hyeon	335
2	3	INFINITE		"Be Mine"	Son Jin-ha	335
2	3	INFINITE		"Be Mine"	Lee Jae-eok	335
2	3	INFINITE		"Be Mine"	Min	335
2	4	Beast		"Fiction"	Shin Chan-bin	303
2	4	Beast		"Fiction"	Ji Jin-seok	303
2	4	Beast		"Fiction"	Choi Soo-min	303
2	4	Beast		"Fiction"	Jeon Chan-bin	303
2	4	Beast		"Fiction"	Lee Jongwon	303
2	4	Beast		"Fiction"	Kim Sung-ho	303
3	5	SHINee		"Sherlock"	Kim Young-won	174
3	5	SHINee		"Sherlock"	Lee Ye-chan	174
3	5	SHINee		"Sherlock"	Kim Kun	174
3	5	SHINee		"Sherlock"	Christian	174
3	5	SHINee		"Sherlock"	Lim Yoon-seo	174
3	5	SHINee		"Sherlock"	Park Jin-oh	174
3	5	SHINee		"Sherlock"	Oh Da-han	174
3	6	EXO	Kai	"Growl"	Song Jae-won	454
3	6	EXO	Kai	"Growl"	Jung Jin-sung	454
3	6	EXO	Kai	"Growl"	Bang Jun-hyuk	454
3	6	EXO	Kai	"Growl"	Kim Jung-woo	454
3	6	EXO	Kai	"Growl"	Park Si-young	454
3	6	EXO	Kai	"Growl"	Suren	454
3	6	EXO	Kai	"Growl"	Park Sung-won	454

=== Collaboration Mission (Episode 12) ===
Team	Original Artist	Song
Vocal	Crush	"Don't Forget"
Rap	Dynamic Duo	"Friday Night"
Performance	Super Junior	"U" & "Black Suit"

== Discography ==
=== Singles ===
Title	Year	Recorded by
Go Tomorrow	2018	Vocal Team
Friends	2018	Rap Team
We Are Young	2018	Performance Team
Like A Magic	2019	Team A
Shooting Star	2019	Team B

== Ratings ==
In the table below, the blue numbers represent the lowest ratings and the red numbers represent the highest ratings.

Ep.	Broadcast date	Average audience share	
Ep.	Broadcast date	AGB Nielsen	
Ep.	Broadcast date	Nationwide	Seoul
1	November 3, 2018	2.2%	NR
2	November 10, 2018	1.7%	NR
3	November 17, 2018	1.9%	NR
4	November 24, 2018	1.5%	NR
5	December 1, 2018	1.2%	NR
6	December 8, 2018	1.4%	NR
7	December 15, 2018	1.2%	NR
8	December 22, 2018	1.5%	NR
9	December 29, 2018	1.6%	NR
10	January 5, 2019	1.6%	NR
11	January 12, 2019	1.1%	NR
12	January 19, 2019	0.9%	NR
13	January 26, 2019	1.0%	NR
14	February 9, 2019	1.3%	NR

== Awards and nominations ==
Year	Award	Category	Recipients	Result	Ref.
2018	18th MBC Entertainment Awards	Excellence Award, Music/Talk Category (Female)	Kim So-hyun	Won	

== Aftermath ==
- 1the9 released their debut extended play (EP) XIX on April 13, 2019. After one and a half years of activities, 1the9 disbanded on August 8, 2020 following their contract expiration.
  - Jeon Do-yum signed an exclusive contract with Bluedot Entertainment and debuted as the members of Just B under the stage names DY and Bain on June 30, 2021.
  - Kim Tae-woo signed an exclusive contract with Keystone Entertainment and debuted as a member of BLANK2Y under the stage name Louis.
  - Shin Ye-chan signed an exclusive contract with Spire Entertainment and debuted as a member of Omega X on June 30, 2021.
  - Jeong Taek-hyeon is currently active as an actor.
  - Yoo Yong-ha and Kim Jun-seo debuted as the members of Oui Entertainment's boy group WEi.
    - Kim Jun-seo also participated in Mnet's survival show Boys II Planet, and made it into the final group, Alpha Drive One.
  - Park Sung-won signed an exclusive contract with RAIN Company and debuted as a member of Ciipher.
  - Lee Seung-hwan left Play M Entertainment and participated on SBS's reality survival show Loud. However, he was eliminated in the first round of the show. In 2021 Lee joined RBW but has since left. He later appeared as a contestant on the Mnet survival show Boys Planet, but he did not make it into the final group, Zerobaseone.
  - Jung Jin-sung left Play M Entertainment.

Other contestants
- Some trainees debuted with groups:
  - Song Jae-won signed an exclusive contract with Yuehua Entertainment and debuted as a member of their new boy group Tempest under the stage name Hwarang.
  - Park Si-young and Khael debuted as the members of DSP Media's new boy group Mirae on March 17, 2020.
  - Bang Jun-hyuk debuted as a member of TOP Media's new boy group MCND under the stage name Win on February 27, 2020.
  - Song Byeong-hee debuted, alongside ITHE9 member Jeon Do-yeom, in the group Just B on June 30, 2021 and adopted the stage name Bain.
  - Lee Ye-chan debuted in KQ's newest boy group Xikers on March 30, 2023.
  - Jungwoo debuted with his group Nine,i on March 30, 2022 under First One Entertainment
  - Christian debuted in a P-pop boy group VXON under the stage name C13
  - Jay Chang debuted in Armada Entertainment's boy group One Pact. He then also subsequently debuted in the project group B.D.U under Orca Music after winning Mnet's Build Up: Vocal Boy Group Survival.
  - Wumuti debuted in the vocal group Waterfire (band), a group that formed during the Mnet survival show Build Up: Vocal Boy Group Survival.
- Some contestants participated in other survival shows:
  - Jay Chang & Wumuti appeared as contestants on Mnet's survival shows, Boys Planet and Build Up: Vocal Boy Group Survival, with Jay Chang winning Build Up: Vocal Boy Group Survival and debuting in the project group B.D.U.
  - Song Byeong-hee (going by his stage name Bain) also competed on the Mnet survival show Build Up: Vocal Boy Group Survival.
  - Suren and Bang Jun-hyuk were contestants on Mnet's survival show Boys II Planet. Bank Jun-hyuk was eliminated in the fifth episode after ranking 50th, and Suren was eliminated in the eighth episode after ranking 28th.
    - Suren will be participating in the Boys II Planet spin-off show Planet C: Home Race He went onto debut in the winning group Modyssey, after ranking 5th.
  - Park Siyoung Left DSP Media, following the disbandment of Mirae on July 9, 2024
  - Park Siyoung will be participated in Upcoming Japanese survival show Produce 101 Japan Shinsekai.
