= B.D.U =

South Korean boy band

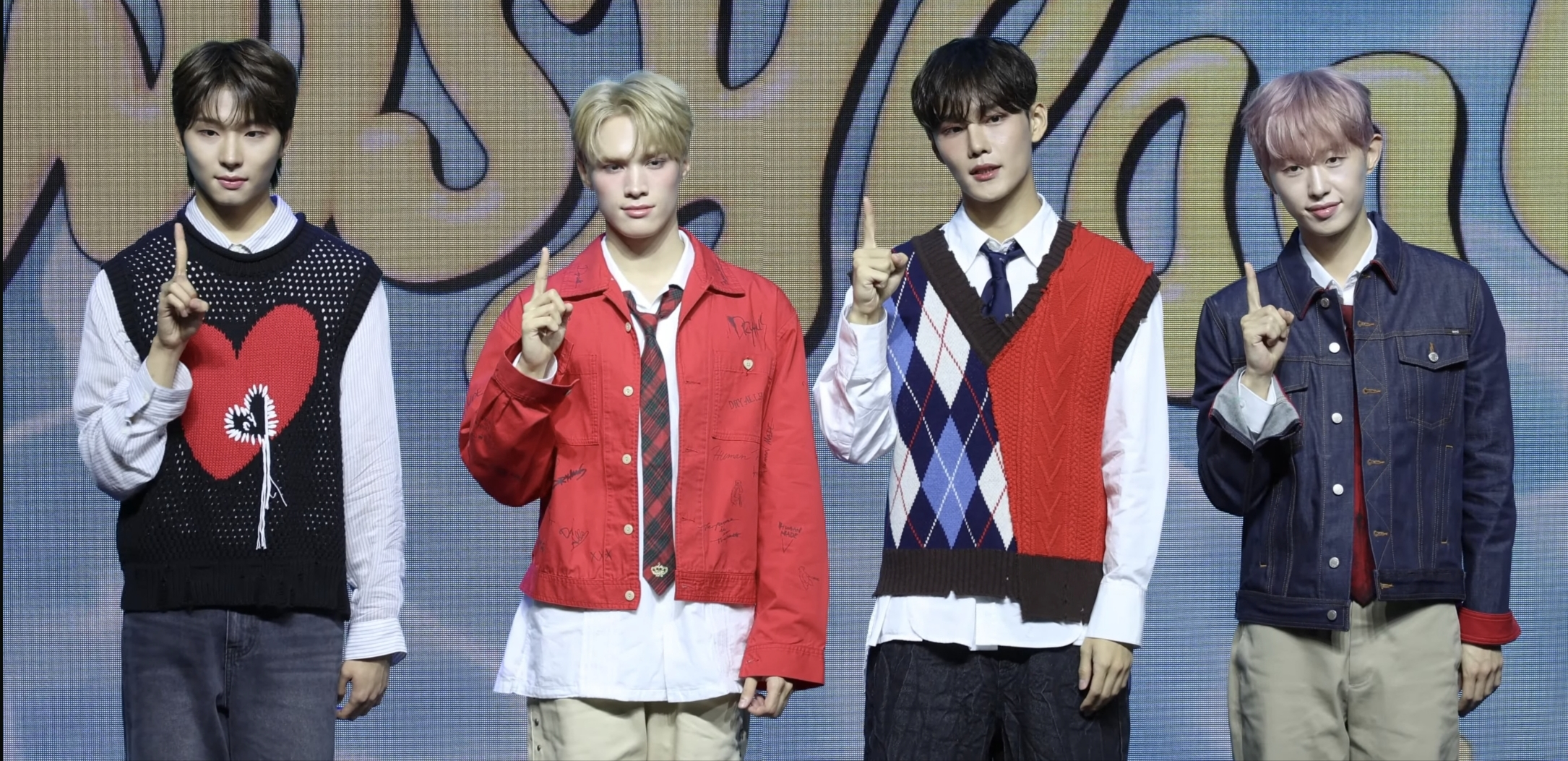
- B.D.U in June 2024; L–R: Kim Min-seo, Jay Chang, Seunghun, and Bitsaeon

Background information
- Also known as: Boys Define Universe
- Origin: Seoul, South Korea
- Genre: K-pop
- Years active: 2024–2026
- Label: Orca Music
- Members: Bitsaeon; Seunghun; Jay Chang; Kim Min-seo
- Website: artist.mnetplus.world/main/stg/bdu

B.D.U (Korean: 비디유; an abbreviation for Boys Define Universe) was a South Korean project vocal boy band formed through Mnet's reality competition program Build Up: Vocal Boy Group Survival and managed by Orca Music. The group consists of four members: Bitsaeon, Seunghun, Jay Chang, and Kim Min-seo. They debuted on June 26, 2024, with the extended play (EP) Wishpool. The quartet remained active for two years and disbanded on March 23, 2026

== Name ==
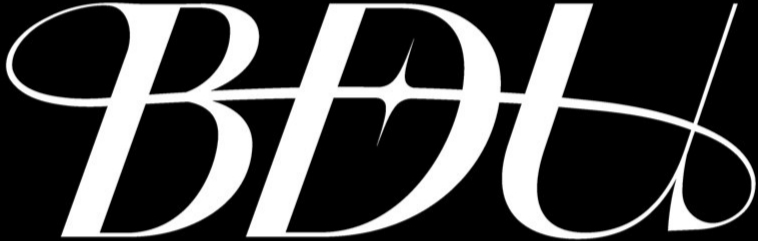
B.D.U official logo.

B.D.U is an abbreviation for Boys Define Universe, where the four members' originate a new universe from their different personas.

== History ==
=== Formation through Build Up: Vocal Boy Group' Survival and other activities ===
B.D.U was formed through Mnet's reality competition program Build Up: Vocal Boy Group Survival, which aired from January 26, to March 29, 2024. The show brought 40 contestants, consisting of current and former idol members, soloists, singer-songwriters, musical actors and individual trainees. Out of the pool of 40 contestants down to five groups with four members, only one group would make to debut. Team HunMinJayBit was announced as the eventual winner on the finale episode which was broadcast live on March 29, 2023, and they also received a ₩100 million cash prize.

Before appearing on the program, all the members had already been active in the entertainment industry. Bitsaeon is a member of M.O.N.T and was a contestants in Mix Nine (2018–2019) where he was eliminated on episode seven while his group placed sixth in the final episode of Peak Time (2023). Seunghun is a member of CIX and was a contestants in YG Treasure Box (2018). Jay Chang is a solo artist and a member of One Pact and was a contestant in Under Nineteen (2018–2019) where he was eliminated in the first round while in Boys Planet (2023) he placed at 10th position. Kim Min-seo was a contestant in The Origin – A, B, Or What? (2022).

=== 2024–present: Debut with Wishpool and world tour ===
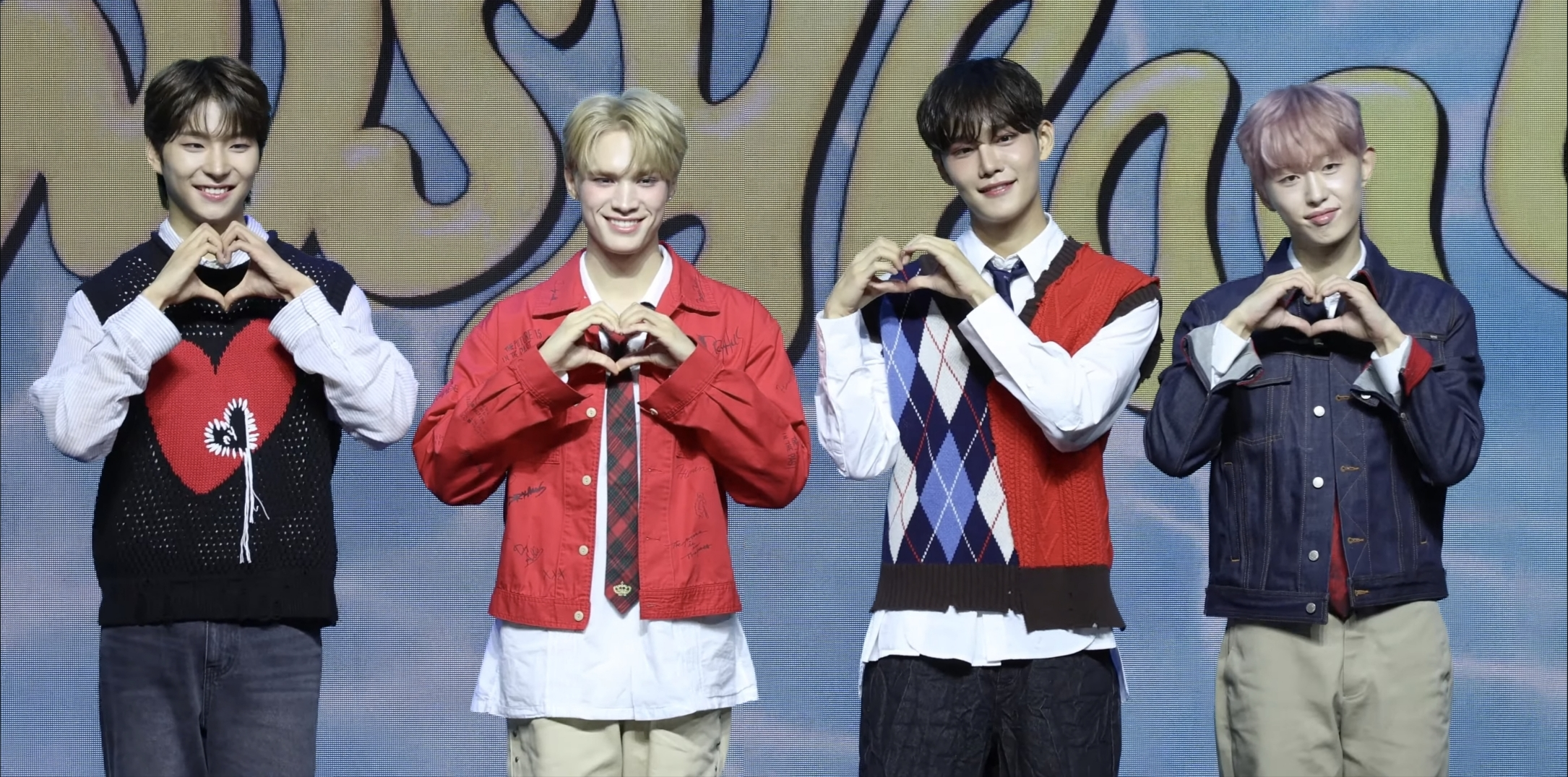
B.D.U debut showcase in June 2024

On June 10, Orca Music announced that B.D.U is set to release their debut EP Wishpool on June 26. The next day, the group announced that they will embark on a world tour titled "Tour for Wishpool: Flash & Light" on 24 cities across Americas and Europe. B.D.U officially debuted on June 26, with their first EP Wishpool along with their lead single "My One" and its music video. On the same day, they held a media showcase for the EP in the afternoon at Yes24 Wonderlock Hall in Changjeon-dong, Seodaemun District, Seoul.

== Members ==
- Bitsaeon
- Seunghun
- Jay Chang
- Kim Min-seo

== Discography ==
=== Extended plays ===
List of extended plays, showing selected details, selected chart positions, and sales figures
Title	Details	Peak chart positions	Sales
Title	Details	KOR	Sales
Wishpool	Released: June 26, 2024; Label: Orca Music; Formats: CD, digital download, streaming	13	KOR: 29,031

=== Singles ===
List of singles, showing year released, selected chart positions and name of the album
Title	Year	Peak chart positions	Album
Title	Year	KOR DL	Album
"My One"	2024	93	Wishpool
"Must Have Love" (2024 Version)	2024	—	Non-album singles
"Friends to Lovers"	2026	TBA	Non-album singles
"—" denotes a recording that did not chart or was not released in that territory

== Videography ==
=== Music videos ===
Song title	Year	Director(s)	Ref.
"My One"	2024	Choi Jae-ho	

== Filmography ==
=== Reality shows ===
Year	Title	Notes	Ref.
2024	Build Up: Vocal Boy Group Survival	Reality competition program determining B.D.U's members	

== Concerts ==
- Tour for Wishpool: Flash & Light
