= Waterfire =

Waterfire may refer to:

- WaterFire, an art installation by Barnaby Evans in Providence, Rhode Island
- Waterfire (band), a South Korean boy band
- Waterfire Saga, a book series from the Disney Publishing franchise based on mermaids
