= Waterfire (band) =

South Korean boy band

- Official logo

Background information
- Origin: Seoul, South Korea
- Genres: K-pop
- Years active: 2024
- Label: Waterfire Co., Ltd.
- Spinoff of: Build Up: Vocal Boy Group Survival
- Members: Sunyoul; Wumuti; Choi Su-hwan; Kang Ha-yoon

Waterfire(Korean: 워터파이어; stylized in all caps) is a South Korean boy band formed through Mnet's reality competition program Build Up: Vocal Boy Group Survival. The quartet comprises Sunyoul, Wumuti, Choi Su-hwan, and Kang Ha-yoon. They made their official debut on May 30, 2024, with the single album Possible.

== History ==
=== Formation through Build Up: Vocal Boy Group Survival and other activities ===
The quartet was formed through the reality competition program Build Up: Vocal Boy Group Survival, aired in the first quarter of 2024. Sunyoul, Wumuti, Choi Su-hwan, and Kang Ha-yoon each separately joined the program. Prior to the One Team Mission of the show, Sunyoul was previously hailed as the top tier among the contestants with the privilege to organize a four-member group. He recruited Kang Ha-yoon, Wumuti, and Choi Su-hwan as team members to form Waterfire. The group reached the finals and finished in third place on the show.

Before appearing on the program, the members had already been active in the entertainment industry. Sunyoul is a member of the boy group Up10tion and appeared as a contestant in King of Mask Singer and Mr. Trot Season 2. In 2015, Wumuti was among the winners of a Chinese survival reality show Super Idol, and debuted as a member of SWIN. He also previously joined reality competition programs Under Nineteen and Boys Planet. Choi Su-hwan was a contestant in 2019's Produce X 101 and debuted as a solo artist in 2021. Kang Ha-yoon was a former contestant for survival singing shows Loud and Kookmin Singer.

=== 2024–present: Debut with Possible ===
The members announced the beginning of their activities on April 15, 2024, as members of the project group Waterfire. On May 30, 2024, the group officially debuted upon the release of their single album Possible which shares the same title as its lead single, and appeared on Mnet's music show M Countdown for the first time.

On January 7, 2025, Wumuti debuted as leader of the group XLOV.

== Members ==
- Sunyoul (선율) – leader
- Wumuti (우무티)
- Choi Su-hwan (최수환)
- Kang Ha-yoon (강하윤)

== Discography ==
=== Single albums ===
List of single albums, with selected details, chart positions and sales
Title	Details	Peak positions	Sales
Title	Details	KOR	Sales
Possible	Released: May 30, 2024; Label: Waterfire Co., Ltd., Mound Media; Formats: PVC card, digital download, streaming; Track listing: 1. "Possible"; 2. "Possible" (Inst.)	—N/a	—N/a
"—" denotes releases that did not chart or were not released in that region.

=== Singles ===
List of singles, showing year released, and album name
Title	Year	Album
"Possible"	2024	Possible

=== Other appearances ===
List of appearances on other albums
Title	Year	Album
"Drama" (orig. song by Aespa)	2024	Build Up: Vocal Boy Group Survival, Part. 5 (One Team Mission)
"Someday" (어느 날)	2024	Build Up: Vocal Boy Group Survival (Semifinal)
"Now" (지금 이 순간)	2024	Build Up: Vocal Boy Group Survival (Final)

== Filmography ==
=== Television shows ===
Year	Title	Network	Role	Notes	Ref.
2024	Build Up: Vocal Boy Group Survival	Mnet and TvN	Contestant (individually, at first; but formed as a group during the show's One Team Mission)	Third Place	
