= Chenggong =

Chenggong may refer to several places:

- Chenggong County, in Kunming, Yunnan, China
- Chenggong, Taitung, township in Taitung, Taiwan
- Chenggong Station, a railway station in Taichung, Taiwan

== See also ==
- Duke Cheng (disambiguation)
