= Jay Chang =

American singer (born 2001)

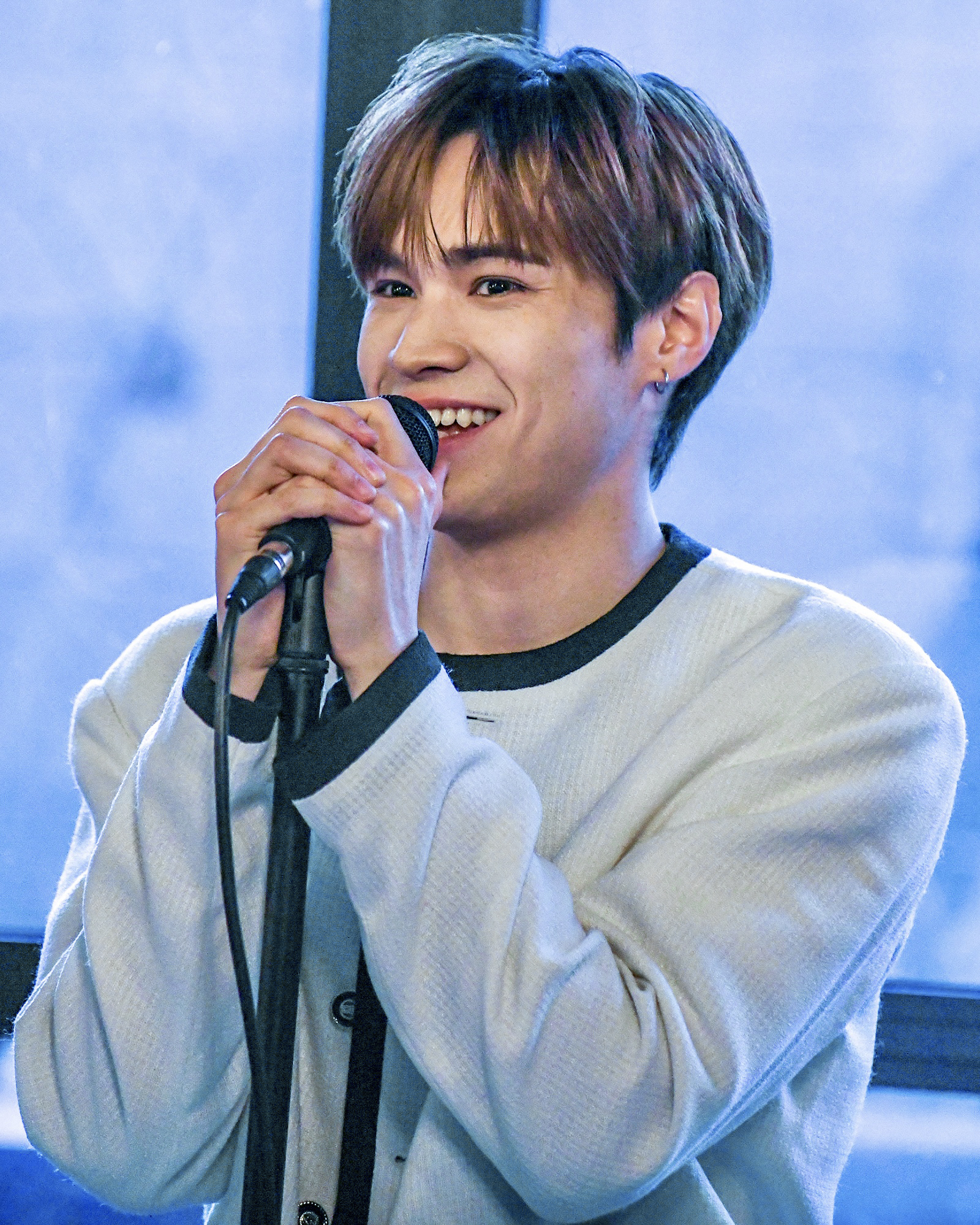
- Chang in March 2024
- Born: Jay Steven Kapossy; March 8, 2001 (age 25); Hasbrouck Heights, New Jersey, USA
- Occupation: Singer
- Musical career
- Genre: K-pop
- Instruments: Vocals; guitar; drums
- Years active: 2018; 2020–present
- Labels: FM; Armada (Note: As a member of One Pact only.)
- Member of: One Pact; B.D.U

Jay Steven Kapossy (born March 8, 2001), known professionally as Jay Chang (Korean: 제이창), is an American singer based in South Korea. He is a member of the South Korean boy band One Pact, formed by Armada Entertainment in November 2023, and is a member of the project group B.D.U, formed through the reality competition show Build Up: Vocal Boy Group Survival in March 2024.

He made his solo debut on November 23, 2020, with the single "Is You". He released his first extended play (EP) Late Night on October 17, 2023.

== Early life ==
Jay Chang was born and raised in Hasbrouck Heights, New Jersey, to a Filipino-Chinese mother and an Irish-Hungarian father. His father was a musician in the 1980s, and Jay grew up watching him perform on late-night shows, serving as his inspiration to enter the music industry.

He was introduced to K-pop as a teenager, when his friend shared a BTS music video online. He then attended a K-pop training academy in 2018.

== Career ==
=== 2018: Under Nineteen ===
In 2018, Jay was scouted by MBC to appear as a contestant on the survival program Under Nineteen where 57 other male K-pop trainees competed to find a place in the final 9-member boy group. Jay was eliminated in the first round of eliminations, finishing in 18th place.

=== 2020–present: Solo debut, Boys Planet, One Pact and B.D.U ===
Jay made his solo debut with his first single "Is You" on November 23, 2020.

In September 2022, Jay signed with FM Entertainment. He released the single "Liar" on September 30. In December, Jay was announced as a contestant on Mnet's reality competition show Boys Planet, representing FM. The show aired from February to April 2023, and aimed to create a 9-member boy group that would debut as Zerobaseone. He narrowly missed making it into final lineup by finishing in 10th place.

Jay release his first EP Late Night on October 17, 2023. His first showcase was held on the same day at IlchiArt Hall in Gangnam, Seoul.

On November 30, 2023, Jay debuted in the group One Pact under Armada Entertainment, a company led by Kangnam. The group is composed of previous Boys Planet contestants. They made their debut with the single "Must Be Nice".

In January 2024, Jay joined the reality music competition show Build Up: Vocal Boy Group Survival, where he and his team (HunMinJayBit) placed first, received a ₩100 million cash prize and will debut under the project group name B.D.U with a two-year contract.

In October 2024, FM announced that Jay would be releasing his second EP Neighborhood on November 22, and it will consists of four tracks that includes his self-composed songs and features One Pact's co-member Tag.

== Discography ==
=== Extended plays ===
List of extended plays, showing selected details, selected chart positions, and sales figures
Title	Details	Peak chart positions	Sales
Title	Details	KOR	Sales
Late Night	Released: October 17, 2023; Label: FM Entertainment; Formats: CD, digital download, streaming; Track listing: 1. "I'll Be There"; 2. "Rockstar"; 3. "Up to You"; 4. "Sunlight"; 5. "I'll Be There" (English version); 6. "Rockstar" (English version)	22	KOR: 6,949
Neighborhood	Released: November 22, 2024; Label: FM Entertainment; Formats: CD, digital download, streaming; Track listing: 1. "Paper Cut"; 2. "LaSalle Ave"; 3. "Four Seasons"; 4. "What You Need" (featuring Tag (One Pact)	44	KOR: 4,000

=== Singles ===
Title	Year	Album
"Is You"	2020	Non-album singles
"Liar"	2022	Non-album singles
"I'd Do Anything"	2023	Non-album singles
"I'll Be There"	2023	Late Night
"Rockstar"	2023	Late Night
"LaSalle Ave"	2024	Neighborhood
"Feel"	2026	Non-album single

=== Composition credits ===
All song credits are adapted from the Korea Music Copyright Association's database unless stated otherwise.

List of songs, showing year released, artist name, name of the album, and songwriting credits
Title	Year	Artist	Album	Lyricist	Composer
"Is You (English version)"	2020	Jay Chang	Non-album singles	Yes	No
"Liar"	2022	Jay Chang	Non-album singles	Yes	No
"I'd Do Anything"	2023	Jay Chang	Non-album singles	Yes	Yes
"I'll Be There"	2023	Jay Chang	Late Night	Yes	Yes
"Up to You"	2023	Jay Chang	Late Night	Yes	No
"Sunlight"	2023	Jay Chang	Late Night	Yes	Yes
"I'll Be There (English version)"	2023	Jay Chang	Late Night	Yes	Yes
"Rockstar (English version)"	2023	Jay Chang	Late Night	Yes	No
"Paper Cut"	2024	Jay Chang	Neighborhood	Yes	No
"LaSalle Ave"	2024	Jay Chang	Neighborhood	Yes	Yes
"Four Seasons"	2024	Jay Chang	Neighborhood	Yes	Yes

== Filmography ==
=== Television show ===
Year	Title	Role	Notes	Ref.
2018	Under Nineteen	Contestant	Eliminated in episode 6; Finished 18th place	
2023	Boys Planet	Contestant	Eliminated in episode 12; Finished 10th place	
2024	Build Up: Vocal Boy Group Survival	Contestant	Finished first place (with Seunghun, Kim Min-seo and Bitsaeon)	
2024	King of Mask Singer	Contestant	as "Blue-Haired Man" (ep. 474-475)	

=== Music video ===
Year	Song title	Director	Ref.
2022	"Liar"	SPNCR	
2023	"Rockstar"	Unknown	
2023	"I'll Be There"	Unknown	

== Concerts ==
=== Fanmeetings ===
- Jay Fanmeeting: The Reason (2023)
- Jay Chang Fanmeeting: Shine on Me in Taipei (2023)
- Jay Chang and Yoon Jong Woo Fanmeeting in Tokyo: The Beginning (2023)
