= One Pact =

South Korean boy band

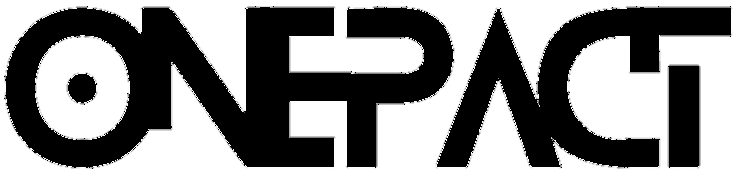
- Official logo

Background information
- Origin: Seoul, South Korea
- Genres: K-pop
- Years active: 2023–present
- Label: Armada
- Members: Jongwoo; Jay Chang; Seongmin; Tag; Yedam
- Website: onepact.bstage.in

One Pact (Korean: 원팩트; Japanese: ワンパクト; stylized in all caps) is a South Korean boy band formed and managed by Armada Ent. The group consists of 5 members: Jongwoo, Jay Chang, Seongmin, Tag, and Yedam. They debuted on November 30, 2023, with the extended play (EP) Moment.

== Name ==
One Pact is derived from two words: "one" and "impact", meaning "to unite together to create a big impact."

== History ==
=== 2023: Introduction and debut with Moment ===
On September 27, Armada Ent announced Jongwoo as the first member of the group.

In October 2023, Armada revealed Seongmin, Tag and Yedam as other members of the group from October 4–6, respectively. On October 10, Armada Ent announced the group's pre-debut tour entitled "2023 One Pact Fan on Tour 'The Pact'" in Japan and Thailand in November 2023. On October 18, Jay Chang introduced as the final member of the group after he released his first EP a day before. One Pact released the performance videos of pre-debut songs "G.O.A.T" and "Hot Stuff" (멋진 거) on their official YouTube account on October 24 and 27, respectively.

On November 1, Armada confirmed that One Pact would debut on the last day November. One Pact released their debut EP Moment along with its lead single "Must Be Nice" (좋겠다) and a music video on November 30. On the same day, One Pact held both a press showcase on the afternoon and fan showcase on the evening at Ilchi Art Hall in Gangnam, Seoul.

=== 2024–present: Paradoxx, "Until Now" and Fallin' ===
On May 12, Armada revealed the scheduler of One Pact's first single album Paradoxx to be released on June 7, 2024. It contains three tracks and member Tag participated in writing and producing all of the songs. The single album along with the lead single "Fxx Off" and its music video was released on June 7.

On August 16, One Pact released their second Japanese single "Until Now" (待ってたキミを) along with a special video.

On September 10, Aramda announced that One Pact would release their second EP Fallin' in October 2024. A week later, Armada confirmed the release date of One Pact's second EP to be October 18, after releasing the schedule on the group's social media accounts.

== Members ==
- Jongwoo (종우) – leader
- Jay Chang (제이창)
- Seongmin (성민)
- Tag (태그)
- Yedam (예담)

== Discography ==
=== Extended plays ===
List of extended plays with selected details, chart positions and sales
Title	Details	Peak chart positions		Sales
Title	Details	KOR	JPN	Sales
Moment	Released: November 30, 2023; Labels: Armada, Warner Music Korea; Formats: CD, digital download, streaming; Track listing: 1. "Hot Stuff" (멋진 거); 2. "Must Be Nice" (좋겠다); 3. "G.O.A.T"; 4. "Rush in 2 U"; 5. "Loading..." (진행중); 6. "Illusion"	3	19	KOR: 68,471; JPN: 2,042
Fallin'	Released: October 18, 2024; Labels: Armada, Warner Music Korea; Formats: CD, digital download, streaming; Track listing: 1. "At the Last Moment"; 2. "Deserved"; 3. "I Still Do"; 4. "As We Walk" (걷다보면); 5. "Next Life" (다음 생); 6. "My Dear"	13	—	KOR: 46,028
Pink Crush	Released: February 14, 2025; Labels: Armada, Warner Music Korea; Formats: CD, digital download, streaming; Track listing: 1. "&Heart"; 2. "Wild"; 3. "B2U"; 4. "Wait" (몇번의 하루); 5. "Confession" (고백); 6. "100!"; 7. "Never Stop"	8	—	KOR: 69,979
One Fact	Released: July 22, 2025; Labels: Armada, Warner Music Korea; Formats: CD, digital download, streaming; Track listing: 1. "Passout" (featuring Tag; Jongwoo solo); 2. "180928~" (Jay Chang solo); 3. "Signal" (Seongmin solo); 4. "Someone Else" (내가 아니더라도; Tag solo); 5. "Keyring" (Yedam solo); 6. "Yes, No, Maybe"; 7. "Blind"; 8. "Lucky"	5	—	KOR: 65,701
1'Only	Released: February 26, 2026; Labels: Armada, Warner Music Korea; Formats: CD, digital download, streaming	6	—	KOR: 51,740
"—" denotes a recording that did not chart or was not released in that territory.

=== Single albums ===
List of extended plays with selected details, chart positions and sales
Title	Details	Peak chart positions	Sales
Title	Details	KOR	Sales
Paradoxx	Released: June 7, 2024; Labels: Armada, Warner Music Korea; Formats: CD, digital download, streaming; Track listing: 1. "Fxx Off" (꺼져); 2. "Dejavu"; 3. "Period" (마침표)	6	KOR: 48,649

=== Singles ===
==== As lead artist ====
Title	Year	Peak chart positions	Album
Title	Year	KOR DL	Album
"Must Be Nice" (좋겠다)	2023	—	Moment
"Fxx Off" (꺼져)	2024	138	Paradoxx
"As We Walk" (걷다보면)	2024	—	Fallin'
"Deserved"	2024	—	Fallin'
"Confession" (고백)	2025	—	Pink Crush
"100!"	2025	62	Pink Crush
"Yes, No, Maybe"	2025	17	One Fact
"Sane"	2026	57	1'Only
"U So Hot"	2026	—	Tuned In
"—" denotes a recording that did not chart or was not released in that territory.

==== Japanese singles ====
List of Japanese singles, with showing year released and album name
Title	Year	Album
"Must Be Nice" (Japanese version)	2024	Non-album singles
"Until Now" (待ってたキミを)	2024	Non-album singles
"Everyday X-Mas"	2024	Non-album singles

== Videography ==
=== Music videos ===
Song title	Year	Director(s)	Notes	Ref.
"Must Be Nice"	2023	Lee Jae-wu	Debut music video	
"Fxx Off"	2024	Lee Jae-wu		
"Sane"	2026	Juli YL		

=== Other videos ===
Song title	Year	Director(s)	Notes	Ref.
"G.O.A.T"	2023	Unknown	Performance videos	
"Hot Stuff"	2023	Junu	Performance videos	
"Rush In 2 U"	2023	JW	Self Made Video	

== Concerts ==
Date	Title	City	Country	Venue	Attendance	Ref.
November 12, 2023	2023 One Pact Fancon Tour 'The Pact'	Bangkok	Thailand	Show DC, Ultra Arena Hall	Unknown	
November 17, 2023	2023 One Pact Fancon Tour 'The Pact'	Yokohama	Japan	Pacifico Yokohama National Convention Hall	Unknown	
