= Build Up: Vocal Boy Group Survival =

2024 South Korean reality competition show

- Also known as: Build Up
- Hangul: 빌드업: 보컬 보이그룹 서바이벌
- RR: Bildeueop: bokeol boigeurup seobaibeol
- MR: Pildŭŏp: pok'ŏl poigŭrup sŏbaibŏl
- Genre: Reality competition; Music competition
- Created by: Mnet
- Developed by: Shin Joon-bum (planning)
- Directed by: Ma Doo-shik; Jung Kyung-wook
- Creative director: Kim Hyun-min
- Presented by: Lee Da-hee
- Judges: Lee Seok-hoon; Seo Eun-kwang; Wendy; Solar; Baekho; Kim Jae-hwan
- Music by: Lim Hyun-gi
- Composer: Jang Jung-hee
- Country of origin: South Korea
- Original language: Korean
- No. of episodes: 10

Production
- Executive producer: Park Chan-wook
- Running time: 90 minutes
- Production companies: CJ ENM; Orca Music; Genie Music; Studio Take One (Note: A subsidiary of CJ ENM.)

Original release
- Network: Mnet; tvN
- Release: January 26 – March 29, 2024

Build Up: Vocal Boy Group Survival (Korean: 빌드업: 보컬 보이그룹 서바이벌) is a 2024 South Korean reality competition show created by Mnet. It aired on Mnet and tvN, and was broadcast live on Mnet K-pop YouTube channel from January 26, to March 29, 2024, every Friday at 22:10 (KST). It is also available for streaming on TVING in South Korea, and on Abema in Japan.

During the live broadcast of the finale episode, it was revealed that the winning team would debut as the project vocal group B.D.U (abbreviation for Boys Define Universe) and promote for two years. The eventual winner, Team HunMinJayBit, also received a ₩100 million cash prize.

== Concept ==
The 40 contestants are divided into four type of voice colors: Allround, Soul, Power, and Unique. Through a series of competitions, the goal is to create a quartet with a profound and unique voices. The contestants are anticipated to demonstrate their vocal prowess and offer a range of vocal performances with distinctive singing styles that set them apart from prior vocal groups.

The project vocal boy group will be active for two years.

== Promotion and broadcast ==
Promotional poster incorporating the host and judges of the show.

In December 2023, Mnet posted on their social media accounts the logo for their new program called Build Up: Vocal Boy Group Survival (빌드업: 보컬 보이그룹 서바이벌; or simply Build Up) and is scheduled to air in the first half of 2024.

It was announced that CJ ENM, Orca Music and Genie Music co-produced the show.

It was also planned that show would stream through major global and Japanese OTT platforms.

The premiere date of Build Up which is on January 26, 2024, was confirmed along with the official poster. It was broadcast both on Mnet and tvN. It was also livestream worldwide on Mnet official YouTube channel.

In March 2024, Mnet confirmed that the show would be available for streaming on Abema in Japan starting March 18.

=== Broadcast schedule ===
Season	Episodes		Originally released		Time slot
Season	Episodes		First released	Last released	Time slot
1	10	2	January 26, 2024	February 2, 2024	Friday at 22:10 (KST)
1	10	3	February 9, 2024	February 23, 2024	Friday at 22:40 (KST)
1	10	5	March 1, 2024	March 29, 2024	Friday at 22:10 (KST)

== Cast ==
=== Host ===
Lee Da-hee served as the show's host, who also hosted similar Mnet shows such as Queendom and Road to Kingdom.

=== Judges ===
Lee Seok-hoon, Baekho, Seo Eun-kwang, Solar, Wendy, and Kim Jae-hwan served as the panel judges, while Seungkwan and Lim Seul-ong served as the special judges of the show.

=== Producers ===
Pdogg, 1601, and PrismFilter were the producers of the semifinals new song of the show.

== Contestants ==
There are a total of 40 contestants participating in the competition, comprising current and former idol members, soloists, singer-songwriters, musical actors and individual trainees.

The English and Korean names of the contestants are presented in accordance with the official website.

Color key (In order of contestant's rank on the show)

Final members of B.D.U
Contestants eliminated in the finals
Contestants eliminated in the semifinals
Contestants eliminated in the fourth round
Contestants eliminated in the third round
Contestants eliminated in the second round

40 Contestants
Allround
Seunghun (승훈)	Bit Sae-on (빛새온)	Choi Su-hwan (최수환)	Geonu (이건우)
Hwang In-hyuk (황인혁)	Yeo One (여원)	Ji Yeon-woo (지연우)	Jang In-tae (장인태)
Jeong Yun-seo (정윤서)	Jeong In-seong (정인성)	Taehwan (태환)	Hong Seong-jun (홍성준)
Soul
Jay Chang (제이창)	Bain (배인)	Lee Dong-hun (이동훈)	Jung Soo-min (정수민)
Lee Min-wook (이민욱)	Lim Sang-hyun (임상현)	Park Ju-he (박주희)	Ma Jae-kyung (마재경)
Kim Seong-jeong (김성정)	Kang Seok-hwa (강석화)		
Power
Kim Min-seo (김민서)	Park Je-up (박제업)	Choi Ha-ram (최하람)	Lim Jun-hyuk (임준혁)
Yun In-hwan (윤인환)	Hyukjin (혁진)	Jo Hwan-ji (조환지)	
Unique
Sunyoul (선율)	Kang Ha-yoon (강하윤)	Jeon Woong (전웅)	Wumuti (우무티)
Kim Seo-hyung (김서형)	Lee Gwang-seok (이광석)	Taewoo (태우)	Neon (네온)
Hong Sung-won (홍성원)	Kwon Eui-bin (권의빈)	Lee Hwan-hee (이환희)	

== Ratings ==
Average TV viewership ratings (Nationwide)
Ep.	Original broadcast date	Average audience share (Nielsen Korea)	
Ep.	Original broadcast date	Mnet	tvN
1	January 26, 2024	N/A	0.539% (54th)
2	February 2, 2024	N/A	0.615% (49th)
3	February 9, 2024	N/A	0.357% (121st)
4	February 16, 2024	0.3%	0.255% (145th)
5	February 23, 2024	0.2%	0.25% (145th)
6	March 1, 2024	0.4%	0.412% (97th)
7	March 8, 2024	0.4%	0.386% (81st)
8	March 15, 2024	0.4%	0.384% (80th)
9	March 22, 2024	0.4%	0.368% (78th)
10	March 29, 2024	N/A	0.243% (171st)
Average		— (Note: Due to multiple unpublished ratings, the exact average rating is unknown.)	0.381%
In the table above, the blue numbers represent the lowest ratings and the red numbers represent the highest ratings.; N/A denotes ratings that were not published.; This program aired on a cable channel/pay TV which normally has a relatively smaller audience compared to free-to-air TV/public broadcasters (KBS, SBS, MBC, and EBS).

== Post-Competition ==
Genie Music announced that they plan to hold a tour titled "2024 Build Up Concert", with the 12 artists from the three top teams at the BEXCO in Busan on June 8, and at SK Handball Stadium in Seoul on June 15–16. They also plan to hold to tour in overseas regions such as Japan.
