= Sequence 01: Curiosity =

- Digital cover

EP by And2ble
- Released: May 26, 2026
- Studios: M-Lab; 821 Sound
- Length: 14:50
- Languages: Korean; English
- Labels: YH; Kakao

And2ble chronology
Sequence 01: Curiosity (2026)	Sequence 02: Attraction (2026)

Singles from Sequence 01: Curiousity
- 1. "Curious" Released: May 26, 2026

Sequence 01: Curiosity is the debut extended play (EP) by the South Korean boy group And2ble. It was released on May 26, 2026, by YH Entertainment and Kakao Entertainment. Throughout its five tracks, the EP blends elements of various genres, including electronic dance music (EDM), house, pop and R&B, while members Zhang Hao, Ricky, and Kim Gyu-vin contributed to the Korean-language lyrics of three songs. It marked the first release by its members after their respective departures from Zerobaseone (Zhang, Ricky, Kim, Han Yu-jin) and Evnne (Yoo Seung-eon).

In support of the EP, the group embarked on the Welcome to Qurious tour, which took place across cities in Asia from June–July. The sole single of Sequence 01: Curiosity, "Curious", was released simultaneously with the EP and was promoted by the group on South Korean music shows, followed by the track "Aura". The EP was released digitally on music download and streaming platforms, with compact disc (CD) editions issued in South Korea and Japan, with the latter being released by Sony Music Japan.

Commercially, Sequence 01: Curiosity peaked at number two on South Korea's Circle Album Chart and was certified 2× Platinum by the Korea Music Content Association for selling over 500,000 units. It has since sold over 600,000 units in South Korea. In Japan, it peaked at number four on the Oricon Albums Chart, selling over 14,000 units in its first week and more than 20,000 units overall. "Curious" charted on the Circle Digital Chart, peaking at number 65, while the remaining tracks charted on its component Circle Download Chart.

== Background ==
On December 8, 2025, Jellyfish Entertainment announced that Yoo Seung-eon and Ji Yun-seo would leave the boy group Evnne following the conclusion of their contracts with the company and return to their original agency, YH Entertainment. The group would continue activities as a five-member group from 2026, consisting of Keita, Park Han-bin, Lee Jeong-hyeon, Mun Jung-hyun, and Park Ji-hoo. Entertainment company WakeOne announced on February 12, 2026, that the boy group Zerobaseone would continue activities with five of its original nine members: Sung Han-bin, Kim Ji-woong, Kim Tae-rae, and Park Gun-wook. The remaining members, Zhang Hao, Ricky, Kim Gyu-vin, and Han Yu-jin, all of whom were signed to YH Entertainment, would pursue activities independently of the group. The announcement followed an initial two-month extension of the group's contract, with the nine-member lineup continuing activities until March, when they held their final concert at the KSPO Dome in Seoul.

On March 18, Ilgan Sports reported that the former Zerobaseone members Zhang Hao, Ricky, Kim Gyu-vin and Han Yu-jin would be part of YH Entertainment's then-upcoming boy group Andouble. YH Entertainment confirmed to Maeil Business that the four members were preparing for their debut, with further details to be announced later. The former Evnne member, Yoo Seung-eon, was later added to the group's lineup, with its agency confirming the news to Newsen on April 3. The group's scheduled debut date was also revealed to be May 26. The group's official name, And2ble, was unveiled on May 1, following the opening of its Instagram account, with other social media channels following on May 6. The title of the group's debut EP, Sequency 01: Curiosity, was announced on April 27.

== Release and promotion ==
And2ble (pictured) performing "Curious" at their debut show.

Sequence 01: Curiosity was released on May 26, 2026, on music download and streaming platforms by YH Entertainment under license to Kakao Entertainment, alongside its single "Curious". A physical release of the EP was issued on CD in South Korea the same day, with a release in Japan occurring on June 5 via Sony Music Japan.

=== Promotional tour ===
Welcome to Qurious
- Promotional tour by And2ble
- Location: Asia
- Associated album: Sequence 01: Curiosity
- Start date: June 19, 2026
- End date: July 26, 2026
- No. of shows: 10
- Producer: Company Z

And2ble embarked on a concert tour in promotion of Sequence 01: Curiosity titled Welcome to Qurious. Announced on April 30, it took place from July–August across four cities in Asia: Seoul, Yokohama, Kobe and Macau.

== Composition ==
Sequency 01: Curiosity features five tracks, with three of the group's members participating in the writing of lyrics, while its production remained largely outsourced, with most of the work being handled by outside collaborators. It features music production team the Stereotypes in the composition and arrangement of three tracks. The opener of the EP, "Curious", is an EDM song, featuring elements of synth pop and future house. Its lyrics were written by Ricky and Zhang Hao, alongside Lee Seu-ran. The lyrics of "Aura" were written by Lee, Ricky and Nevada, and the track features elements of pop-R&B, with synths, hushed vocals and a slower tempo. "Sugar Rush" is a dance-pop bubblegum track with lyrics written by Im Su-ran, Kim Gi-tae and Moon Ji-young about physical attraction, featuring guitar elements. "Bed" is an acoustic pop song, with lyrics written by Jeong-seon, Moon and Sam Carter, featuring the group singing in their falsetto register. The EP's closer and alternative pop song, "Happy &", had its lyrics written by BrotherSu and members Zhang and Kim Gyu-vin, with the group singing about the celebration of new beginnings.

== Critical reception ==
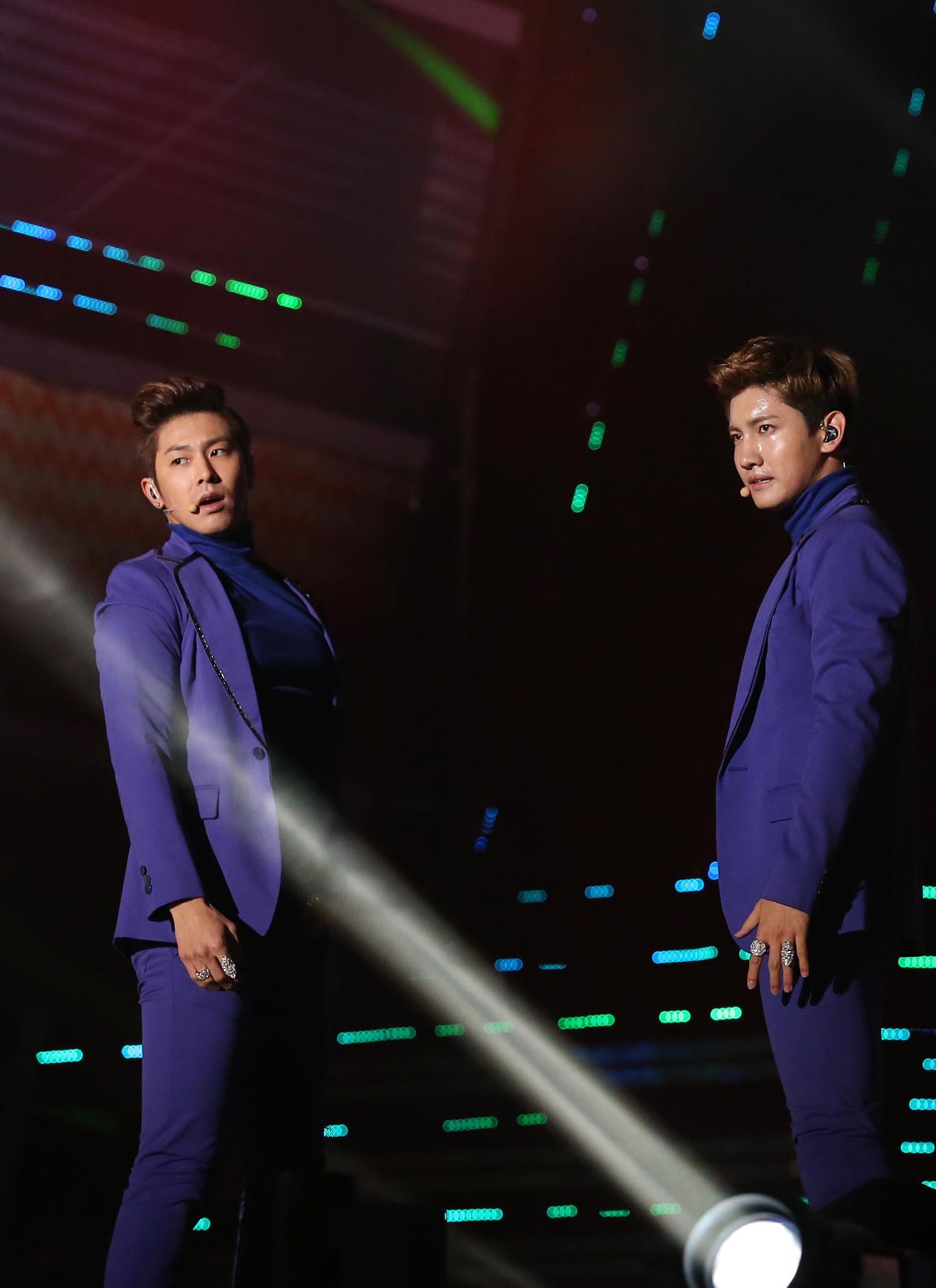
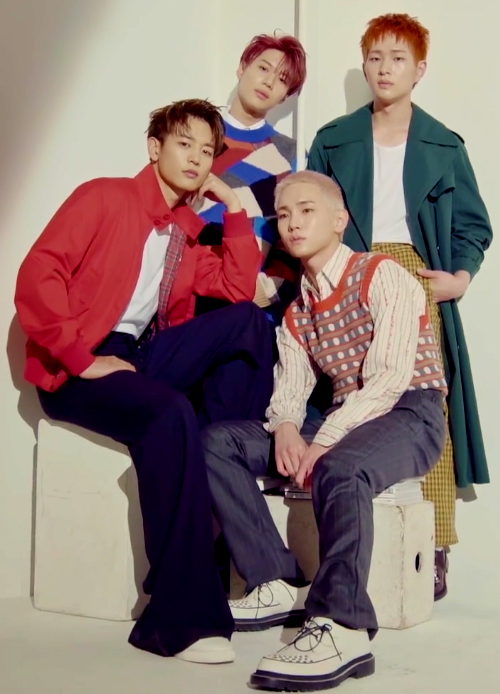
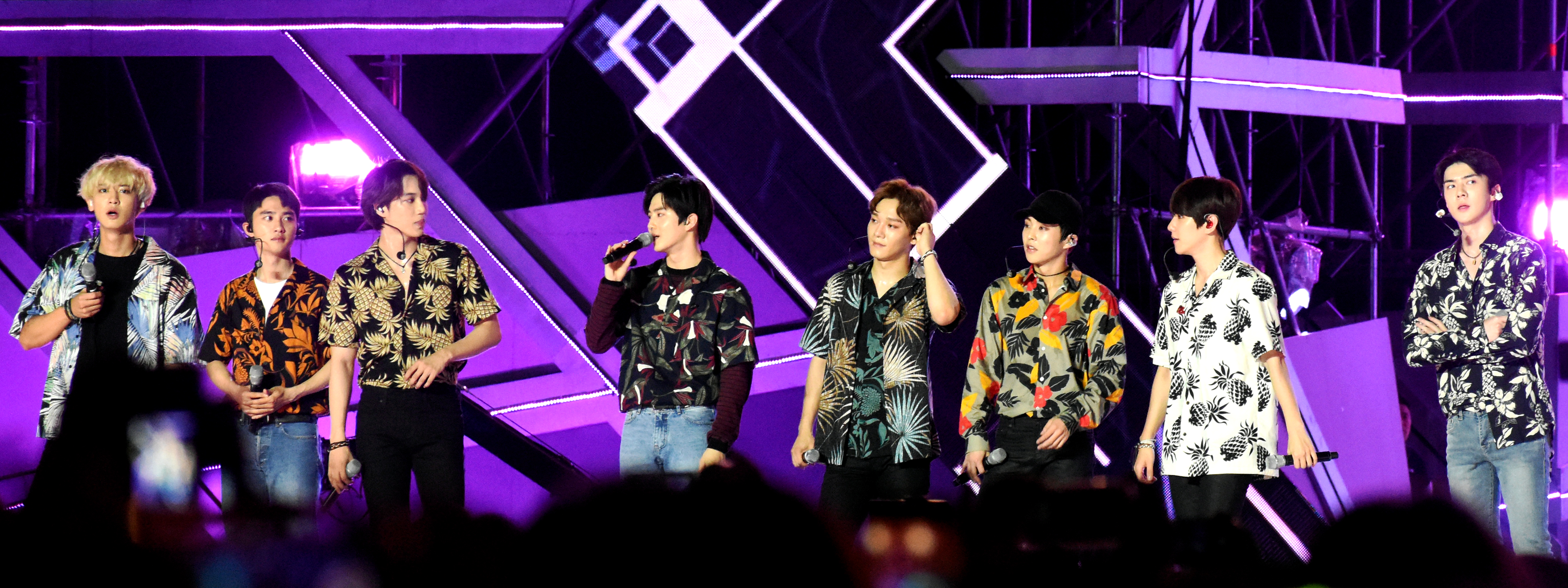
Clockwise from top left: The chorus of "Curious" was compared to fellow K-pop acts TVXQ, Shinee and Exo.

Writing for TV Daily, Kim Jin-seok described Sequence 01: Curiosity as a "captivating first step", praising its trendy and alluring mood, while Kim Han-gil highlighted the contrast in moods between the EP's songs. Kim Ji-ha described it as a "clever debut work". In a review of "Curious" for IZM, Shin Dong-gyu rated the song one and a half stars, comparing its chorus to those of other K-pop acts such as Shinee, Exo and TVXQ, calling the track's attempt at establishing their own identity as something "difficult to believe".

Nancy Jiang of Billboard Korea described the EP as reminiscent of K-pop's "third generation", and saying its sound "borders on reverence" for that era. Jiang also highlighted the member's individual skills, including Yoo Seung-eon's high vocal register, which was complemented by Zhang Hao's "warmer" tone. Ricky's R&B-leaning vocal delivery was also praised, alongside the smoother tones of Kim Gyu-vin and Han Yu-jin.

== Commercial performance ==
Two editions of Sequence 01: Curiosity placed on South Korea's Circle Album Chart: the standard edition debuted at number 2 with 471,090 units sold, while the Poca edition debuted at number 5 with 135,000. The standard edition also charted on the monthly chart in June–July 2026 at number 6 and 13, respectively, while the Poca edition charted in May and July at number 18 and 31, respectively. It also placed in the chart's 2026 first-half issue, with the standard edition at number 22 and the Poca edition at number 74, with each version selling 612,687 and 135,000 units, respectively. The album has been certified 2× Platinum by the Korea Music Content Association for selling over 500,000 certified units. Internationally, the album debuted at number 6 on Japan's Oricon Albums Chart, peaking at number 4 the following week. It also charted on its monthly issue, debuting at number 14 after selling 24,134 units.

The EP's single, "Curious", charted on South Korea's Circle Digital Chart, peaking at number 65. It also debuted at number 2 on the Circle BGM Chart and number 8 on its monthly edition during May. On the Circle Download Chart, all five tracks charted, with "Curious" debuting at number 2, followed by "Aura" at number 23, "Sugar Rush" at number 26, "Happy &" at number 29, and "Bed" at number 30. All five tracks also charted on the monthly edition in May, with "Curious" at number eight, "Aura" at number 162, "Sugar Rush" at number 188, "Happy &" at number 192, and "Bed" at number 194.

== Track listing ==
Sequence 01: Curiousity track listing
No.	Title	Lyrics	Music	Arrangement	Length
1.	"Curious"	Lee Seu-ran; Zhang Hao; Ricky	The Stereotypes; August Rigo; Kosmic	The Stereotypes	2:58
2.	"Aura"	Lee; Ricky; Nevada	Jack Brady; Jordan Roman; JT Roach; Anthony Watts; Mlite	The Wavys	3:12
3.	"Sugar Rush"	Im Su-ran; Kim Gi-tae; Moon Ji-young	The Stereotypes; Kameron Glasper; 9AM; Macy Marshburn; 72; Kosmic	The Stereotypes; 9AM	3:07
4.	"Bed"	Jeong-seon; Moon; Sam Carter	The Stereotypes; Eben Franckewitz; 9AM; Kosmic	The Stereotypes; 9AM	2:12
5.	"Happy &"	BrotherSu; Zhang; Kim Gyu-vin	John Mars; Matilda Thompson; Christoffer Thomas Collins; Mlite	Mars	3:21
Total length:					14:50

== Credits and personnel ==
The credits were adapted from the EP's liner notes and Apple Music.

=== Locations ===
- Digitally edited at:
  - MWF Hives (track 1)
  - 821 Sound (2, 5)
  - EFS (3)
- Mastered at 821 Sound Mastering
- Mixed at:
  - Normandy Studios (1)
  - Hop Cribs (1)
  - Alawn Music Studios (2, 5)
  - East Iris Studios (3)
  - GLAB Studios (4)
- Recorded at:
  - Studio M-Lab (1, 3–4)
  - 821 Sound (2, 5)

=== Musicians ===
- And2ble – vocals
- Sam Carter – background vocals, vocal direction
- August Rigo – background vocals (1)
- The Stereotypes – programming (1, 3–4)
- The Wavys – programming (2)
- 9AM – programming (3–4)
- John Mars – programming (5)

=== Technical ===
- Kim Tae-hyun – recording (1, 3–4)
- Choi Ja-yeon – recording (1, 3–4)
- Sam Carter – digital editing
- Lee Ji-hong – digital editing (1, 4)
- Woooooo0 – digital editing (1)
- Bob Horn – mixing (1)
- Jade Alysse Berry – mixing (1)
- Kwon Nam-woo – mastering
- Yoo Eun-jin – mastering assistance
- Kim Min-hee – recording, digital editing (2, 5)
- Alawn – mixing (2)
- Kim Jeong – digital editing (3)
- Jaime Veloz – mixing (3)
- Shin Bong-won – mixing (4)

== Charts ==
=== Weekly charts ===
Weekly chart performance
Chart (2026)	Peak position
Japanese Albums (Oricon)	4
South Korean Albums (Circle)	2

=== Monthly charts ===
Monthly chart performance
Chart (2026)	Peak position
Japanese Albums (Oricon)	14
South Korean Albums (Circle)	6

== Certifications and sales ==
Certifications and sales
Region	Certification	Certified units/sales
South Korea (KMCA)	2× Platinum	500,000^{^}
Japan (Oricon)	—N/a	24,134
^{^} Shipments figures based on certification alone.

== Release history ==
Release dates and formats
Region	Date	Format	Label	Ref.
South Korea	May 26, 2026	Compact disc	YH	
Various	May 26, 2026	Download; streaming	YH; Kakao	
Japan	June 5, 2026	Compact disc	Sony Music Japan	
