= Dong-ah Institute of Media and Arts =

Technical college in Anseong, South Korea

Coordinates: 37.0585643°N 127.3582311°E

Dong-Ah Institute of Media and Arts
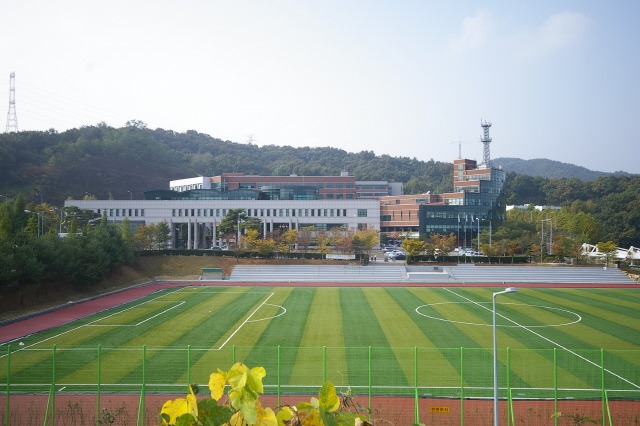
- Former name: Dong-Ah Broadcasting College
- Motto in English: Be the Shining Star in the Field of Media and Arts
- Type: Junior College
- Established: 1997
- Chairman: Won-suk Choi
- President: Yong H. Choi
- Location: Samjuk-myeon, Anseong City, Gyeonggi province, South Korea
- Website: www.dima.ac.kr/eng/

Korean name
- Hangul: 동아방송예술대학교
- Hanja: 東亞放送藝術大學校
- RR: Donga bangsong yesul daehakgyo
- MR: Tonga pangsong yesul taehakkyo

Dong-ah Institute of Media and Arts (Korean: 동아방송예술대학교; formerly known as Dong-Ah Broadcasting College) is a technical college in South Korea specialized in training professionals in the fields of media design, production, and communications. The campus is situated in Samjuk-myeon, Anseong City, Gyeonggi province, South Korea. The name has been changed to Dong-Ah Institute of Media and Arts as of January 15, 2007.

Dong-ah Institute of Media and Arts was ranked 171st (tied with Jeju National University and Kumoh National Institute of Technology) in Asia by QS Asian Universities Ranking in 2010.

== Academics ==
Associate Degree Programs (3-year program)

- School of Media Production
  - Department of New Media Content
  - Department of Digital Image Design
  - Department of Audio Production
    (Specialism: Recording Arts, Sound Post Production & Design, Live Sound)
  - Department of Scenography
- School of Content Creation
  - Department of Video Production
  - Department of Broadcast Content Production
  - Department of Broadcast Writing
  - Department of Film Art
  - Department of Advertising Creative
  - Department of Fashion Styling
  - Department of Entertainment Management
- School of Performing Arts
  - Department of Theatre
  - Department of Musical Theatre
  - Department of Acting for Screen
  - Department of K-pop Performance
- School of Applied Music
  - Department of Vocal Performance
    (Principal Study: Vocal Performance, Songwriting)
  - Department of Instrumental Performance
    (Principal Study: Jazz Piano, Guitar, Bass, Drum, Wind Instruments and Percussion)
  - Department of Composition
    (Specialism: Producing, Songwriting, Electronic Music, Toplining)
- School of Liberal Studies
  - Department of Broadcast Technology
    (Majors: Broadcast Production Technology, Broadcast System, Broadcast Sound Technology)
  - Department of Liberal Studies in Content Creation
    (A major exploration program for new students entering the School of Liberal Studies. In the second semester, students can enter one of six departments within the School of Content Creation.)
  - Department of Global K-Music Content (international students only)
- Multi Major Programs
  - Interdisciplinary Program : Combined Major
  - Interdisciplinary Program : Convergence Major
  - Student-Designed Major

Bachelor's Degree Programs for Advanced Major Courses
(1-year program after completing 3-year AA degree course)

- School of Broadcasting and Arts Production
  - Department of Broadcast Technology
  - Department of Media Content Production
  - Department of Broadcast Content Production
  - Department of Applied Music
  - Department of Audio Production
  - Department of Acting Arts
  - Department of K-pop Performance
  - Department of Arts and Culture Marketing

== History ==
The school was opened in 1997 as Dong-ah Broadcasting Specialized College. On January 15, 2007, the school was renamed Dong-ah Institute Of Media and Arts.

Dong-ah has a student-exchange program with Illinois State University where Korean students can graduate with a degree from an American University and ISU students can spend a semester or more abroad experiencing the Korean culture. Dong-ah also has a student-exchange program with California State University, Fullerton called the DIMA program and caters especially to Communications majors.

== Notable alumni ==
- Bae Woo-hee (Dal Shabet)
- Cho Seung-youn (UNIQ/X1)
- Cho Yoon-woo
- Ha Sung-woon (Wanna One/Hotshot)
- Heo Sol-ji (EXID)
- Hyuk (VIXX)
- Hoshi (Seventeen)
- Jang Dong-min
- JeA (Brown Eyed Girls)
- JR (NU'EST)
- Jun. K (2PM)
- Kim Kiri
- Kim Woo-seok (UP10TION/X1)
- Yoo Ki-hyun (Monsta X)
- Kwon Eun-bi
- Lee Chang-min (2AM and Homme)
- Lee Don-ku
- Lee Eun-gyeol
- Lee Hee-jin (Baby V.O.X)
- Lee Hong-bin (VIXX)
- Lee Jung
- Lee Kwang-soo
- Lee Yeon-doo
- Michelle Lee
- Nam Hyun-joon
- Noh Woo-jin
- Park Sung-hoon (actor)
- Park Sung-kwang
- Woohyun (Infinite)
- Song Yuvin (Myteen/B.O.Y)
- Sung Hanbin (ZEROBASEONE)
- Kim Jiwoong (ZEROBASEONE)
- Yang Yo-seob (Highlight)
- Yoo Se-yoon
- Zico (Block B)

== See also ==
- Education in South Korea
- List of colleges and universities in South Korea
