= Kim Ji-woong =

South Korean singer and actor (born 1998)

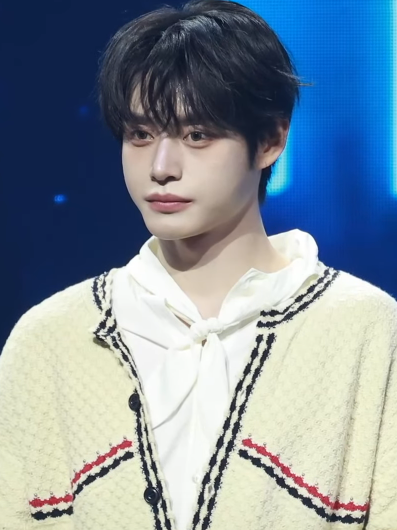
- Kim in February 2025
- Born: December 14, 1998 (age 27); North Gyeongsang Province, South Korea
- Other name: Jinam
- Occupations: Singer; actor
- Years active: 2016–present
- Agent: Nest Management
- Height: 180 cm (5 ft 11 in)
- Musical career
- Genre: K-pop
- Labels: NA Entertainment (Note: As a member of INX only.); Wake One (Note: As a member of Zerobaseone only.)
- Member of: Zerobaseone
- Formerly of: INX

Korean name
- Hangul: 김지웅
- RR: Gim Jiung
- MR: Kim Chiung

Signature
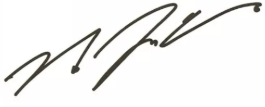

Kim Ji-woong (Korean: 김지웅; born December 14, 1998) is a South Korean singer and actor. Kim is best known for competing on the reality competition show Boys Planet where he ranked 8th in the final episode, earning him a spot in the South Korean boy band Zerobaseone. Prior to this, Kim was a member of the boy group INX under the name Jinam until their disbandment in 2017. He made his debut as an actor in the web series The Sweet Blood (2021), and is best known for his role in Kissable Lips (2022).

== Early life ==
Kim Ji-woong was born on December 14, 1998, in North Gyeongsang Province, South Korea. Kim's father was a member of the Republic of Korea Marine Corps. He has two brothers: an older brother, who is one year older than him, and a younger brother, who is ten years younger than him.

== Career ==
=== 2016–2018: Debut with INX, disbandment, and agency lawsuit ===
Kim made his debut as a singer in 2016 as a member of the South Korean boy group, INX, under the stage name Jinam. The group disbanded at the end of 2017 and in 2018, they filed a lawsuit against their agency asking for their exclusive contract to be terminated under claims of mistreatment. The Seoul District Court favored the group in the verdict, voiding the contract between them and their agency.

=== 2018–2020: Ateen, B.I.T, and Burn Up: Challenge to Billboard ===
After the disbandment of his previous group, Kim joined pre-debut boy group Ateen under the stage name "King". The group was supposed to promote in South Korea after releasing with the single "Boku wa Chotto Chigau" in Japan on September 1, 2018, but the plan never got realized. Six out of the ten members of the group sued the CEO of their company for sexual assault. The group disbanded in 2019 after the group won the lawsuit and their contract was terminated.

After the disbandment, Kim worked as a model in Vietnam, Taipei and China Fashion Week. Following this, Kim and fellow former Ateen members Segun, Joel and Rookie, joined the pre-debut group B.I.T. The group only promoted in Japan and disbanded in August 2020.

Following the disbandment of B.I.T, Kim participated in the 2020 reality survival show Burn Up: Challenge to Billboard. He won first in the male category and soon released the single "Sick of Love" together with Kim Min-jung, who placed first in the female category.

=== 2021–2025: Acting debut, Boys Planet, and debut with Zerobaseone ===
In 2021, Kim made his acting debut with his first leading role in Naver TV's web series The Sweet Blood, which is adapted from the webtoon The Sweet Girl.

In 2022, Kim acted in the BL web series Kissable Lips. Kim then acted in the web series Roommates of Poongduck 304 which is based on a novel by Noh Ga-jeong. The series gained a significant amount of attention and ranked 1st for the BL genre on the South Korean streaming service "Watcha." On December 29, Kim was unveiled as a contestant on Mnet's reality competition show Boys Planet.

On March 19, 2023, singer Holland announced on his social media accounts that Kim will be featured in the music video of his song titled "Number Boy" for his newest album of the same name which was released on March 30. On April 20, Kim placed 8th with a total of 1,338,984 points in the final episode of Boys Planet, allowing him to debut with the winning group, Zerobaseone. He re-debuted in July 2023 with their first mini album "Youth in the Shade."

In May, Kim played as Lee Ji-woong in the series The Good Bad Mother.

=== 2026–present: "Closer", "Sign", "Drive" ===
On July 14, 2026, it was announced that Kim Jiwoong will be releasing his first digital single "Closer", the same day at 12PM (KST).

On August 14, it was announced that Kim Jiwoong will be releasing his second digital single "Sign", the same day at 12PM (KST).

On September 4, JTBC Entertainment News reported that Kim Jiwoong had been cast as the lead in “Siren,” playing Do Yoon, a third-generation chaebol and police academy student, with filming set to begin soon. The drama follows his character as he teams up with an ace detective from an ordinary background to investigate various cases, and it is being developed as a multi-format project spanning film, mid-form, and short-form content. On September 14, it was announced that Kim Jiwoong will be releasing his third digital single "Drive", the same day at 12PM (KST).

== Other ventures ==
=== Endorsements and collaborations ===
Year	Brand	Category	Title(s)
2024–2025	Gucci	Italian fashion label	Friends of the House

=== Fashion ===
Kim worked as a model in Vietnam, Taipei and China Fashion Week. Jiwoong has appeared in various fashion magazines including BNT pictorial, CeCi China, Arena HOMME+, MEN Noblesse and Marie Claire Korea.

=== Philanthropy ===
Kim has participated in various philanthropic activities. In 2021, Jiwoong donated the worst fire incident in Turkey experienced in decades. In 2024 he donated to the Green Umbrella Children's Foundation, which supports children's dreams, protects them from rainstorms, and helps them reach their full potential. On March 27, 2025, he donated ₩10 million to wildfire victims to aid recovery efforts for communities affected by large-scale wildfires across Ulsan, North Gyeongsang, and South Gyeongsang. This was especially meaningful to him as it happened near his birthplace of Pohang. On August 19, 2025, also donated ₩10 million to the Hope Bridge Korea Disaster Relief Association to support victims of torrential rains and flooding in the greater Seoul area. On June 2, 2026, he donated ₩10 million to the Hope Bridge National Disaster Relief Association. The donation will go toward a program that helps the children celebrate special occasions.

== Discography ==
=== Singles ===
Year	Title	Album
2021	"Sick of Love" (with Kim Min-jeong)	Burn Up
2026	"Closer"	Non-album single
2026	"Sign"	Non-album single
2026	"Drive"	Non-album single

=== Soundtrack appearances ===
List of soundtrack appearances, showing year released, selected chart positions, and name of the album
Title	Year	Peak chart positions	Album
Title	Year	KOR	Album
"Dream of You" (with Yoon Seo-bin)	2022	—	Roommates of Poongduck 304 OST
"I'll be..." (그런사람)	2022	—	Roommates of Poongduck 304 OST
"Running" (달려가) (with Ricky, Kim Gyuvin and Han Yujin (Zerobaseone))	2025	—	I Am a Running Mate OST
"—" denotes a recording that did not chart or was not released in that territory.

=== Songwriting credits ===
List of songs, showing year released, artist name, and name of the album
Title	Year	Artist	Album	Lyricist	Ref.
"Say My Name"	2023	Boys Planet	Boys Planet - Artist Battle	Yes	
"내 곁에 (Stand by me)" (Note: A non-commercial song recorded by Kim to celebrate his 27th birthday)	2024	Himself	Non-album single	Yes	
"1214°C" (Note: A non-commercial song recorded by Kim to celebrate his 28th birthday)	2025	Himself	Non-album single	Yes	
"Closer"	2026	Himself	Non-album single	Yes	
"Sign"	2026	Himself	Non-album single	Yes	
"Drive"	2026	Himself	Non-album single	Yes	

== Filmography ==
=== Film ===
Year	Title	Role	Notes	Ref.
2022	Kissable Lips	Kim Jun-ho	Movie version	

=== Television series ===
Year	Title	Role	Notes	Ref.
2023	The Good Bad Mother	Lee Ji-woong	Guest Appearance (Ep. 5, 7, 8 & 11)	
2025	Surely Tomorrow	Oh Goon	Special Appearance (Ep. 3, 9 & 10)	

=== Web series ===
Year	Title	Role	Notes	Ref.
2021	The Sweet Blood	Yoon Chi-woo		
2022	Don't Lie, Rahee	Seol Ho-won		
2022	Kissable Lips	Kim Jun-ho		
2022	Convenience Store Junkies	Si-woo		
2022	Pro, Teen	Eun Ga-ram	Episode 5	
2022	Roommates of Poongduck 304	Ji Ho-jun		

=== Television shows ===
Year	Title	Role	Notes	Ref.
2020	Burn Up: Challenge to Billboard	Contestant	Winner	
2023	Boys Planet	Contestant	Finished eighth place as a member of Zerobaseone	
2023	Inkigayo	Special MC	on November 26, 2023	
2023	M Countdown	Special MC	with Sung Han-bin and Zhang Hao on August 3, 2023	
2025	Music Bank	Special MC	on September 12, 2025	

=== Web shows ===
Year	Title	Role	Notes	Ref.
2023	Boy Detective Kim Ji-woong	MC	12 episodes	

=== Music videos ===
Year	Title	Other performer(s) credited	Ref.
2014	"Shut Up U" (시끄러워U)	Wassup	
2021	"Into you" (빠져들겠어)	OnlyOneOf	
2021	"So what, if the flowers are pretty" (꽃이 예뻐봤자 뭐해)	Shin Yong-jae	
2022	"Beautiful Memories" (이별한 이유가 너무 아파)	Lim Han-byul	
2023	"Number Boy"	Holland	
2024	"내 곁에" (Stand by me)	None	
2025	"1214°C"	None	
2026	"Closer"	None	
2026	"Sign"	None	
2026	"Drive"	None	

== Awards and nominations ==
Name of the award ceremony, year presented, award category, nominee(s) of the award, and the result of the nomination
Award ceremony	Year	Category	Nominee(s) / Work(s)	Result	Ref.
Seoul International Drama Awards	2023	Outstanding Asian Star – Korea	Roommates of Poongduck 304	Nominated	
