= Han Yu-jin =

South Korean singer (born 2007)

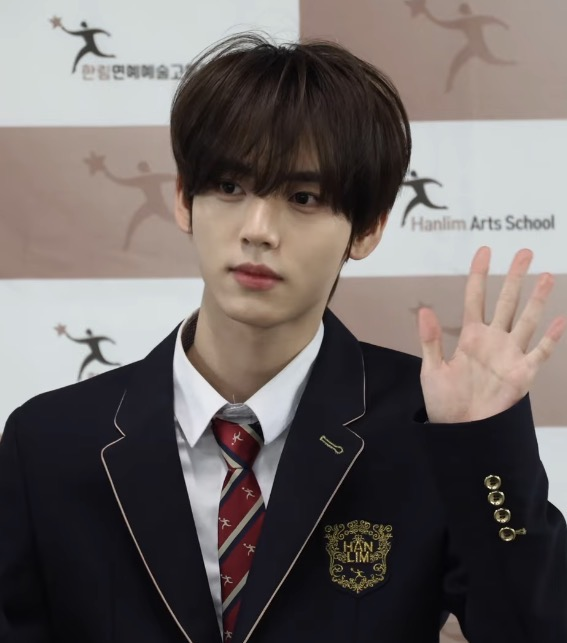
- Han in January 2026
- Born: March 20, 2007 (age 19); Daegu, South Korea
- Education: Hanlim Multi Art School
- Occupation: Singer
- Musical career
- Genre: K-pop
- Instrument: Vocals
- Years active: 2022–present
- Labels: YH; WakeOne (Note: As a member of Zerobaseone only.)
- Member of: And2ble
- Formerly of: Zerobaseone

Korean name
- Hangul: 한유진
- RR: Han Yujin
- MR: Han Yujin

Han Yu-jin (Korean: 한유진; born March 20, 2007) is a South Korean singer. He is a member of South Korean boy group And2ble under YH Entertainment and former member of project boy group Zerobaseone, having finished ninth in Mnet's boy group survival reality television show Boys Planet in 2023.

== Early life and education ==
Han was born on March 20, 2007, in Daegu, South Korea, but moved to Gwanggyo New Town, Gyeonggi-do, South Korea. He moved to Yongin, Gyeonggi-do when he was elementary school. Han attended Seongbok Elementary and Middle School.

In 2020, Han was recruited by YH Entertainment where he trained for 2 years & 3 months before joining the survival show Boys Planet.

Han took the Korean College Scholastic Ability Test (CSAT), before graduating from Hanlim Multi Art School on January 8, 2026, focusing on Practical Dance Department.

== Career ==
=== 2022–2026: Boys Planet and debut with Zerobaseone ===
On December 29, 2022, Han was revealed as a contestant on Mnet's reality survival show Boys Planet. The show aired from February 2 until its finale on April 20, 2023. Han represented YH Entertainment, he performed NCT 127's "Kick It" for his first evaluation and selection for which he was heavily appreciated by the panel and was the youngest contestant to receive an "all star" rating for his performance.

Han was credited as a songwriter for his performance of the battle round song "Say My Name" on Boys Planet, which was collectively performed by the sub-unit "Say Yes!". The song achieved notable commercial success, ranking at number 35 on the Melon Top 100 chart and number 19 on the Bugs chart, prior to their debut. Han is also listed as a songwriter with the Korea Music Copyright Association (KOMCA) under his birth name, for the same work.

Han was placed 9th with a total of 1,196,622 points in the final episode of Boys Planet, which led him to debut with, Zerobaseone. The group officially debuted under WakeOne Entertainment with the EP Youth in the Shade on July 10, 2023.

On April 4, 2024, Han was announced as the MC for SBS’ Inkigayo alongside Ive's Leeseo and actor Moon Seong-hyun. He stepped down from his role on September 15, 2025.

Han contributed vocals to the special OST, "Running" for the TVING drama, I Am a Running Mate, released on June 16, 2025, alongside Kim Gyu-vin, Ricky and Kim Ji-woong. Han also contributed to the OST Part 2, "Salvation", for the KBS2 TV drama, Twelve, which was released on September 6, 2025, alongside Park Gun-wook and Ricky.

On January 12, 2026, YH Entertainment released a statement announcing that Han would depart from Zerobaseone to continue his activities under the label following the expiration of his contract with WakeOne Entertainment, alongside his labelmates and fellow Zerobaseone members, Zhang Hao, Ricky, and Kim Gyu-vin. It was further stated that their contracts had been extended until March 15 to allow them to conclude their encore performances and final group activities. On March 15, the group held their final concert as a nine-piece ensemble, officially concluding Han's activities with Zerobaseone, along with Zhang Hao, Ricky, and Kim Gyu-vin.

=== 2026–present: Re-debut with And2ble ===
On March 18, 2026, it was reported that Han would debut in a new boy group called And2ble under YH Entertainment on May 26, 2026, with three former bandmates—Zhang Hao, Ricky, and Kim Gyu-vin—and former Evnne member Yoo Seung-eon.

== Other ventures ==
=== Endorsements ===
On March 18, 2024, Han appeared on the cover of the April, 2024 issue of Cosmopolitan Korea and was recognized as the youngest male cover model for the magazine.

In July 2024, Han was featured on the cover of CHIC Magazine.

Han appeared on the cover of Allure Korea in partnership with Barrie for their May 2025 issue. On April 12, 2025, Han was announced as a model for Barrie, a Scottish premium cashmere brand under Chanel's Métiers d'Art.

On September 28, 2025, Han was announced as the brand ambassador for the South Korean skincare brand, Bewants (stylized as, bewants).

On December 23, 2025, it was announced that Han would be featured on the cover of Allure Korea's 2026 January digital issue; he was featured with French brand Trudon for their perfume collection, "Medié".

=== Merchandise ===
On December 30, 2025, it was announced that the "Yujini Twenty Noah Lip Balm Set", a limited-edition official merchandise item, would be released to commemorate Han turning 20 under the Korean age system.

== Discography ==
=== Soundtrack appearances ===
List of soundtrack appearances, showing year released, selected chart positions, and name of the album
Title	Year	Peak chart positions	Album
Title	Year	KOR	Album
"Running" (with Kim Gyu-vin, Ricky, Kim Ji-woong)	2025	—	I Am a Running Mate OST
"Salvation" (with Park Gun-wook, Ricky)	2025	—	Twelve OST Part 2
"—" denotes a recording that did not chart or was not released in that territory.

=== Composition credits ===
All song credits are adapted from the Korea Music Copyright Association's database unless stated otherwise.

List of songs, showing year released, artist name, and name of the album
Title	Year	Artist	Album	Lyricist	Composer
"Say My Name"	2023	Say-Yes!	Boys Planet – Artist Battle EP	Yes	No

== Filmography ==
=== Television shows ===
Year	Title	Role	Note(s)	Ref.
2023	Boys Planet	Contestant	Finished 9th as a member of Zerobaseone	

=== Hosting ===
Year	Title	Role	Note(s)	Ref.
2024–2025	Inkigayo	MC	with Leeseo and Moon Seong-hyun	
2025	Inkigayo UNICON in Tokyo Dome	Special MC Day 1	with Yook Sung-jae and Sullyoon	
