= And2ble =

South Korean boy band

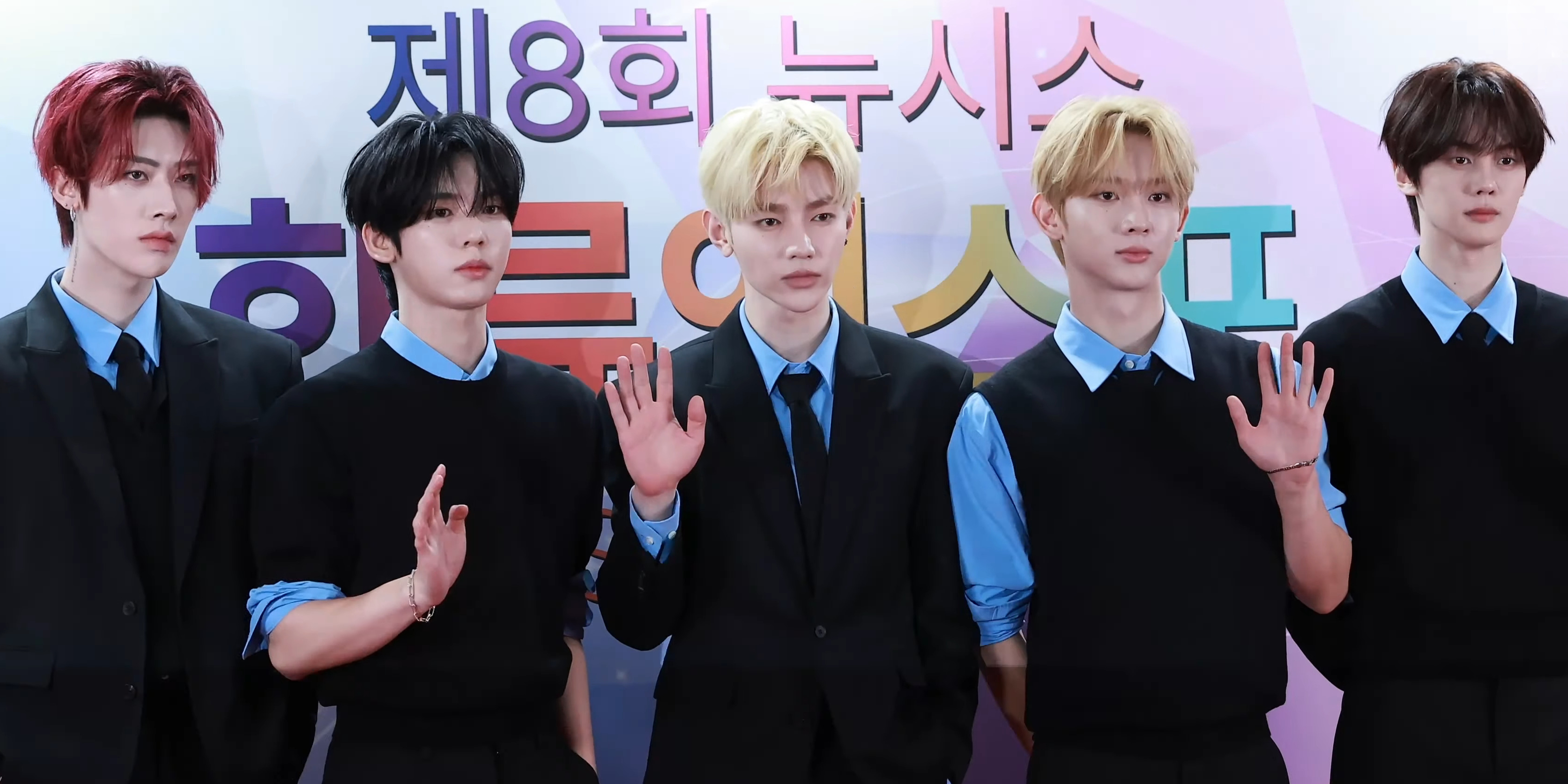
- And2ble in August 2026; L–R: Ricky, Han Yu-jin, Zhang Hao, Yoo Seung-eon, and Kim Gyu-vin

Background information
- Origin: Seoul, South Korea
- Genre: K-pop
- Years active: 2026–present
- Labels: YH; Epic Japan
- Members: Zhang Hao; Yoo Seung-eon; Ricky; Kim Gyu-vin; Han Yu-jin
- Website: and2ble.com

And2ble (Korean: 앤더블; pronounced "and double" and stylized in all caps) is a South Korean boy band formed and managed by YH Entertainment. The group consists of five members: Zhang Hao, Yoo Seung-eon, Ricky, Kim Gyu-vin, and Han Yu-jin. They debuted on May 26, 2026, with the extended play (EP) Sequence 01: Curiosity.

== History ==
=== 2023–2025: Pre-debut activities ===
The five members, representing YH Entertainment, participated in the reality competition series Boys Planet in 2023. After finishing in the top nine, Zhang Hao, Ricky, Kim Gyu-vin, and Han Yu-jin were named to the final lineup of the show's boy band Zerobaseone, and promoted as its members until March 10, 2026. Yoo Seung-eon finished 16th during the show's finale, but later debuted and promoted as a member of Evnne until December 8, 2025.

=== 2026–present: Formation and debut with Sequence 01: Curiosity ===
On March 18, 2026, YH Entertainment announced that Zhang Hao, Ricky, Kim Gyu-vin, and Han Yu-jin would debut in a new boy group called And2ble. The group name "And2ble" is a combination of "and" and "double". Yoo Seung-eon was later revealed as the final member.

On May 26, And2ble made their official debut with the extended play Sequence 01: Curiosity released under YH Entertainment. The EP was introduced by the agency as the opening chapter of the group's musical journey, exploring curiosity as a fundamental human emotion. Its lead track, "Curious"—an EDM-based song blending synth-pop and future house elements—carries a message about embracing change without fear, with members Zhang Hao and Ricky contributing to its lyrics. On June 2, the group secured their first music show trophy in 8 days since debut on The Show with "Curious". Sequence 01: Curiosity debuted with 731,673 album sales the first week, marking them as only second to Alpha Drive One for 2026 Biggest Debut Album Sales Weeks by a K-Pop Rookie Group. On June 26, it was announced that And2ble signed with Epic Records Japan ahead of the group's Japan debut. On October 27, the group released their second EP Sequence 02: Attraction, with the lead single "French Kissing".

== Members ==
- Zhang Hao (장하오) – leader
- Yoo Seung-eon (유승언)
- Ricky (리키)
- Kim Gyu-vin (김규빈)
- Han Yu-jin (한유진)

== Discography ==
=== Extended plays ===
List of extended plays, showing selected details, selected chart positions, and sales figures
Title	Details	Peak chart positions		Sales
Title	Details	KOR	JPN	Sales
Sequence 01: Curiosity	Released: May 26, 2026; Labels: YH Entertainment; Formats: CD, digital download, streaming	2	4	KOR: 606,090; JPN: 33,853
Sequence 02: Attraction	Released: October 27, 2026; Labels: YH Entertainment; Formats: CD, digital download, streaming	3	7	KOR: 682,730; JPN: 11,200

=== Singles ===
List of singles, showing year released, selected chart positions, and name of the album
Title	Year	Peak chart positions	Album
Title	Year	KOR	Album
"Curious"	2026	65	Sequence 01: Curiosity
"French Kissing"	2026	125	Sequence 02: Attraction

== Videography ==
=== Music videos ===
Title	Year	Director(s)	Ref.
"Curious"	2026	Lee Min-hee (Rigend Film)	
"French Kissing"	2026	Beomjin (Paranoid Paradigm)	

== Concert tours ==
Title	Date	Associated album(s)	Location	Shows	Setlist	Attendance	Ref.
Welcome to Qurious	June 19 – July 26, 2026	Sequence 01:Curiousity	South Korea, Japan, Taiwan	10	Setlist: 1. "Curious"; 2. "Aura"; 3. "Who" (Kim Gyu-vin solo); 4. "Gotta Go" (Ricky solo); 5. "Good Boy Gone Bad" (Zhang Hao solo); 6. "Serendipity" (Han Yu-jin solo); 7. "Eternity" (Yoo Seung-eon solo); 8. "Ditto" (Seoul) / "Kaijū no Hanauta" (Yokohama); 9. Invitation (Ricky, Han Yu-jin); 10. First (Zhang Hao, Yoo Seung-eon, Kim Gyu-vin); 11. Sugar Rush; 12. Bed; 13. Happy&		

== Accolades ==
=== Awards and nominations ===
Name of the award ceremony, year presented, category, nominee(s) of the award, and the result of the nomination
Award ceremony	Year	Category	Nominee(s)	Result	Ref.
Brand of the Year	2026	Seoul Metropolitan Council Chairman's Award	And2ble	Won	
K-World Dream Awards	2026	Artist Award	And2ble	Won	
K-World Dream Awards	2026	Super Rookie Award	And2ble	Won	
SPOTV K-Pop Awards	2026	Rookie Award	And2ble	Won	
SPOTV K-Pop Awards	2026	Bonsang	And2ble	Won	
TMElive International Music Awards	2026	Most Anticipated International Group	And2ble	Won	

=== State and cultural honors ===
Name of country or organization, year given, and name of honor
Country or organization	Year	Honor	Ref.
Newsis K-Expo Cultural Awards (Note: Co-sponsored by Korea's Ministry of Culture, Sports and Tourism, Ministry of Trade, Industry, and Energy, Korea Communications Commission, and Korea Creative Content Agency, it awards cultural icons and businesses that promote the sustainability of the Korean Wave and boost the industry's competitiveness.)	2026	Seoul Metropolitan Council Chairperson's Award	
Newsis K-Expo Cultural Awards	2026	Global Netizen Award	
