= TIOT =

South Korean boy band

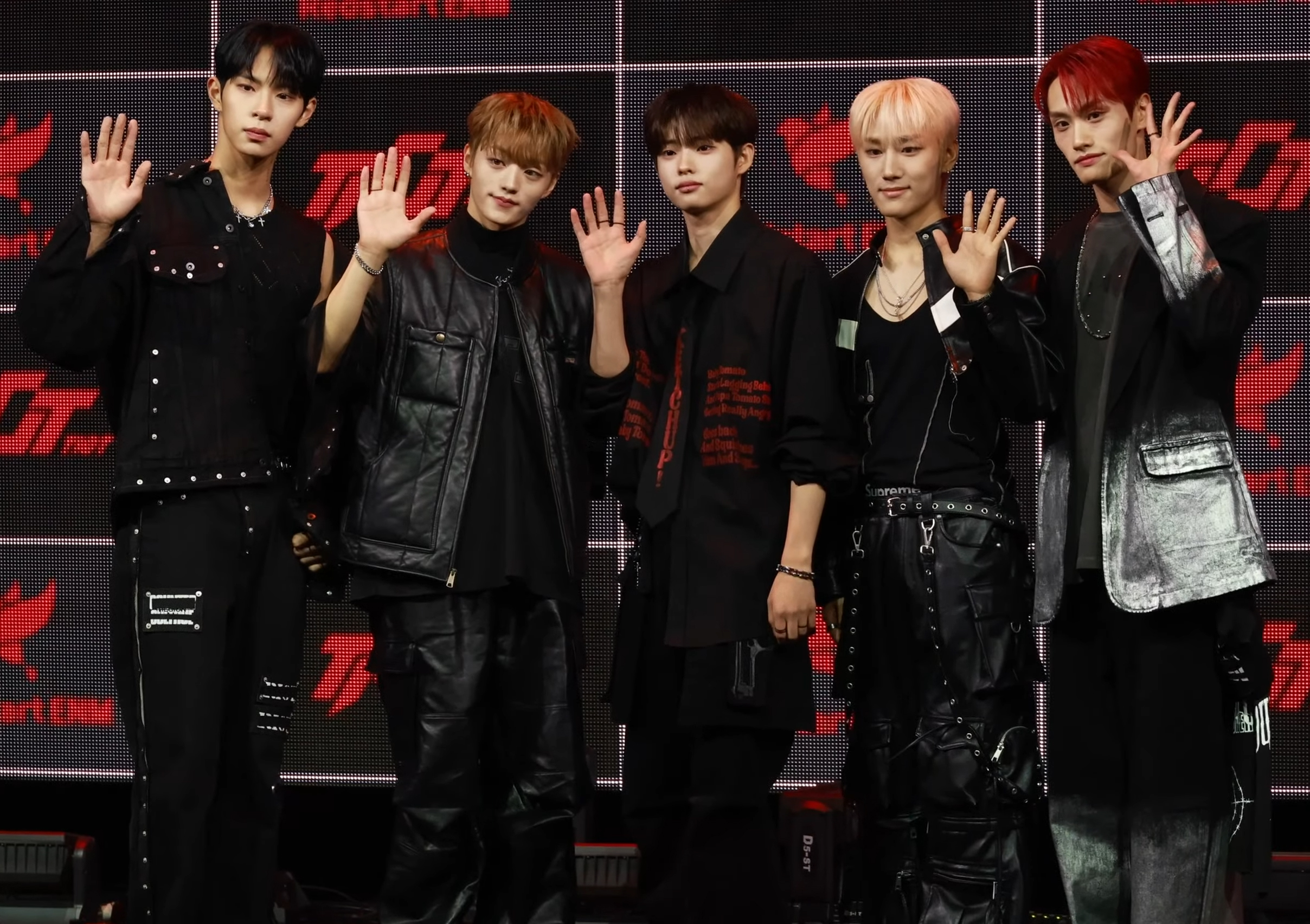
- TIOT in 2024

Background information
- Origin: Seoul, South Korea
- Genre: K-pop
- Years active: 2023–present
- Label: Redstart ENM
- Members: Kim Min-seoung; Kum Jun-hyeon; Hong Keon-hee; Choi Woo-jin; Shin Ye-chan

TIOT (Korean: 티아이오티; abbreviated as Time Is Our Turn) is a South Korean boy band formed and managed by Redstart Entertainment. The group consists of five members: Kim Min-seoung, Kum Jun-hyeon, Hong Keon-hee, Choi Woo-jin, and Shin Ye-chan. They debuted on April 22, 2024, with the EP Kick-Start.

== History ==
=== Pre-debut ===
==== Redstart Boys ====
In 2023, Min-seoung, Jun-hyeon, Keon-hee and Woo-jin participated in Boys Planet. They placed 58th, 14th, 84th, and 50th respectively. On June 10, under the name of Redstart Boys, they held their first fan meeting This Time Is Our Turn in Korea in Naksan Hall Auditorium, Hansung University, where they teased the release of a remake of Click-B's Undefeatable (백전무패). On June 19, Redstart Boys performed in the joint concert 2023 K-Pop Rookies Festa in Bangkok in MCC Hall, The Mall Ngamwongwan, Bangkok alongside other Boys Planet participants: Jay Chang, Yoon Jong-woo, Lee Hwanhee and Lee Dongyeol. Over June 24 and June 25, they held the Japan dates of their fan meeting, with the latter date being an additional show in response to overwhelming demand for tickets.

==== TIOT ====
On August 1, 2023, Redstart ENM revealed the group's official name to be TIOT, an abbreviation of 'Time Is Our Turn'. On August 23, they released their pre-debut album Frame the Blueprint: Prelude to Possibilities, of which The Boyz member Sunwoo participated in production. On September 5, TIOT received their first nomination for first place on a music show on SBS' The Show, where they ultimately came in third. On October 12 and 14, they held their Japan tour, Blueprint: TIOT in Zepp Osaka Bayside and Zepp Haneda respectively. On December 14, they released winter seasonal single "Find the Way". On December 30, TIOT's first fan concert 2023 TIOT Fancon: Find the Way was held at Sky Art Hall in Gangseo, Seoul. On January 9, 2024, Jun-hyeon released his first digital single WWW. On January 30, TIOT held the Japanese show for this concert, now titled 2024 TIOT Live: Find the Way, at Zepp Shinjuku.

=== 2024–present: Debut with Kick-Start ===
On April 22, 2024, TIOT debuted as a quintet, including new member and youngest in the group Shin Ye-chan, with the EP Kick-Start and lead track "Rock Thang", which Min-seoung and Jun-hyeon received writing credits for.

== Members ==
- Kim Min-seoung (김민성)
- Kum Jun-hyeon (금준현)
- Hong Keon-hee (홍건희)
- Choi Woo-jin (최우진)
- Shin Ye-chan (신예찬)

== Discography ==
=== Extended plays ===
List of extended plays, showing selected details, selected chart positions, and sales figures
Title	Details	Peak chart positions		Sales
Title	Details	KOR	JPN	Sales
Frame the Blueprint: Prelude to Possibilities	Released: August 23, 2023; Labels: Redstart ENM, Warner Music Korea; Formats: CD, digital download, streaming; Track listing: 1. "This Is Our Time"; 2. "Unbeatable" (백전무패); 3. "Bungee"; 4. "Surfing"; 5. "Starlight"	4	—	KOR: 72,983
Kick-Start	Released: April 22, 2024; Labels: Redstart ENM, Warner Music Korea; Formats: CD, digital download, streaming; Track listing: 1. "Goosebumps"; 2. "Rock Thang"; 3. "Moonrise" (간나요); 4. "Paradise"; 5. "Baby Shark" (아기상어)	6	30	KOR: 63,622; JPN: 841
Flex Line	Released: April 17, 2025; Labels: Redstart ENM, Warner Music Korea; Formats: CD, digital download, streaming; Track listing: 1. "Flex Line"; 2. "Always"; 3. "Sweet Magic"; 4. "Birthday"	6	—	KOR: 32,440
My Pride	Released: September 23, 2025; Labels: Redstart ENM, Warner Music Korea; Formats: CD, digital download, streaming; Track listing: 1. "I'm the One"; 2. "My Pride"; 3. "I Don't Wanna Wait (IDWW)"; 4. "Every Ten Minutes"	15	—	KOR: 28,442
"—" denotes a recording that did not chart or was not released in that territory.

=== Singles ===
List of singles, showing year released, selected chart positions, and name of the album
Title	Year	Peak chart positions	Album
Title	Year	KOR Down.	Album
"Unbeatable" (백전무패)	2023	146	Frame the Blueprint: Prelude to Possibilities
"Find the Way"	2023	—	Non-album single
"Rock Thang"	2024	—	Kick-Start
"The Long Season" (계절 긴 터널을 지나)	2024	—	Non-album singles
"Take It Slow"	2024	—	Non-album singles
"Flex Line"	2025	—	Flex Line
"My Pride"	2025	—	My Pride
"—" denotes a recording that did not chart or was not released in that territory.

== Awards and nominations ==
List of awards and nominations received by TIOT
Award ceremony	Year	Category	Nominee / Work	Result	Ref.
Seoul Music Awards	2022	Rookie Award	TIOT	Nominated	
