= Le'v =

Chinese singer

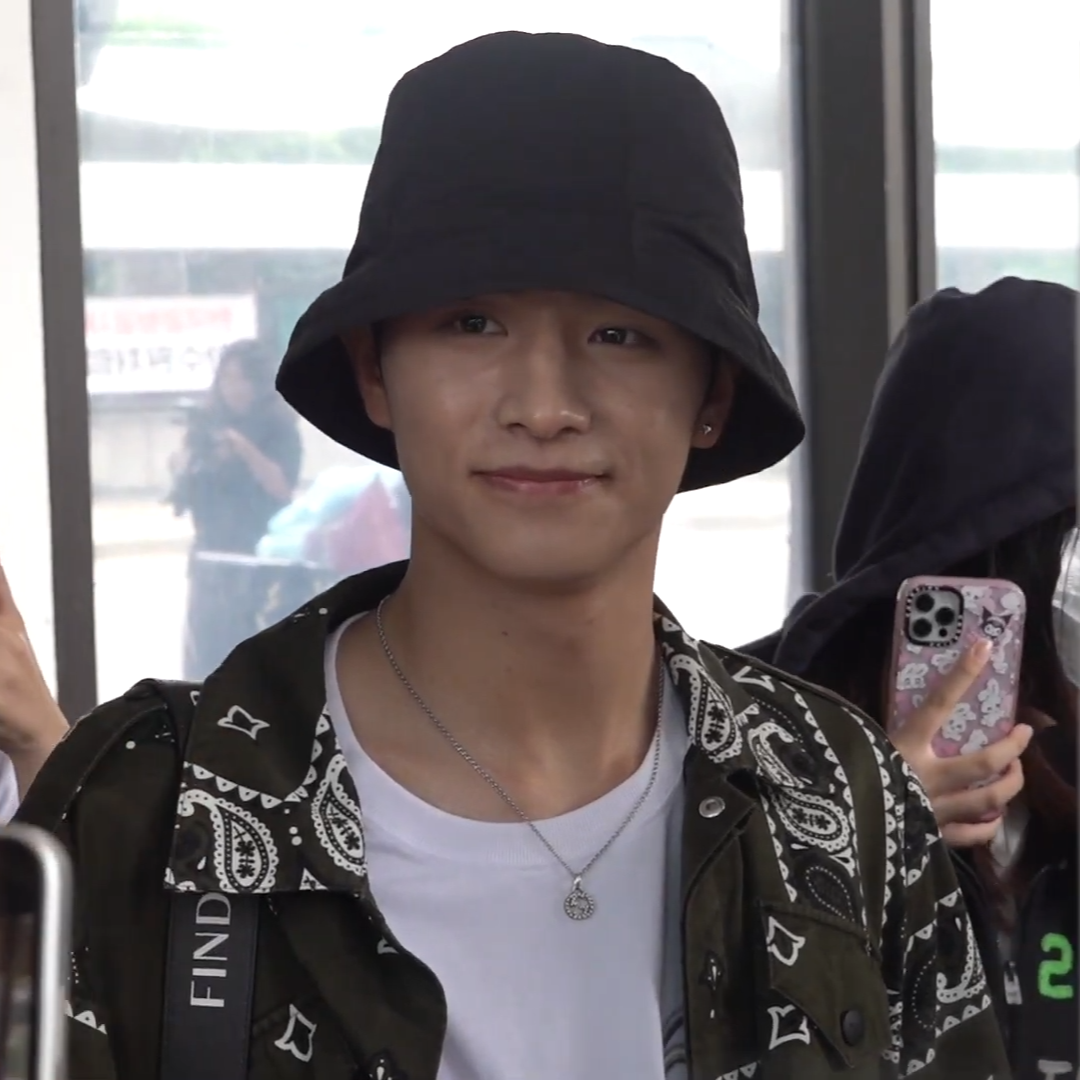
- Le'v in June 2023
- Born: Wang Zihao; March 6, 2001 (age 25); Zhumadian, Henan, China
- Occupation: Singer
- Height: 178 cm (5 ft 10 in)
- Musical career
- Genre: K-pop
- Instrument: Vocals
- Years active: 2023–present
- Label: Chromosome
- Website: lev.bstage.in lev-japan.jp

Chinese name
- Simplified Chinese: 王子浩
- Hanyu Pinyin: Wáng Zǐhào

Wang Zihao (Chinese: 王子浩; Korean: 왕즈하오; born March 6, 2001), known professionally as Le'v (Korean: 레비; Japanese: レビ; stylized in all caps), is a Chinese singer based in South Korea. He is best known for being a contestant on Mnet's reality competition show Boys Planet. He made his debut as a solo artist on August 18, 2023, with the extended play (EP) A.I.BAE.

== Career ==
=== 2022–present: Boys Planet and debut with A.I.BAE ===
On December 29, 2022, Wang was unveiled as a contestant on Mnet's reality competition show Boys Planet, representing his agency Chromosome Entertainment. The show aired from February 2 to April 20, 2023. He was eliminated on the eleventh episode of the show, finishing in nineteenth place. Wang and fellow Boys Planet contestant Hiroto held a Japanese fan meeting titled Lock Your Heart, Just Do It! in Tokyo at the Tokyo International Forum on June 10 and 11, and in Osaka at the Grand Cube Osaka on July 15 and 16.

On July 27, 2023, Chromosome Entertainment announced that Wang will be debuting in mid-August later that year, with the stage name Le'v. On August 1, the debut album is revealed to be an EP titled A.I.BAE, together with the release of the promotion schedule and concept photos. The EP was released on August 18, along with the lead single of the same name. Le'v held his first solo Japanese fan meeting titled Le'v the First Fanmeeting Time in Japan in Osaka at Zepp Namba on September 28 and in Tokyo at Zepp DiverCity on October 1.

== Discography ==
=== Extended plays ===
List of extended plays, showing selected details, selected chart positions, and sales figures
Title	Details	Peak chart positions	Sales
Title	Details	KOR	Sales
A.I.BAE	Released: August 18, 2023 (KOR); Label: Chromosome Entertainment; Formats: CD, digital download, streaming; Track listing: 1. "A.I.BAE" (Chinese ver.); 2. "A.I.BAE" (Korean ver.); 3. "Exchange ID" (交换ID) (Chinese ver.); 4. "Exchange ID" (Korean ver.)	12	KOR: 66,139
Quantum Leap (跃迁之脉)	Released: November 22, 2024 (JPN); Label: Chromosome Entertainment; Formats: Digital download, streaming; Track listing: 1. "新世界·碰撞" (Chinese ver.); 2. "新世界·誕生" (Japanese ver.); 3. "Butterfly" (蝶变) (Chinese ver.); 4. "Butterfly" (蝶变) (Japanese ver.); 5. "Ain't Got You"	—	
"—" denotes releases that did not chart or were not released in that region.

=== Singles ===
List of singles, showing year released, and name of the album
Title	Year	Album
"A.I.BAE"	2023	A.I.BAE
"Shinsekai·Tanjyou" (新世界·誕生)	2024	Quantum Leap
"4AM"	2026	Non-album singles
"Bu Fan" (不凡)	2026	Non-album singles

=== Promotional singles ===
List of promotional singles, showing year released, and additional notes
Title	Year	Notes
"You and I Knows" (你和我都懂)	2025	Theme for Perfect Singer 2
"Today's Us" (with Lay Zhang, R.E.D, Nouera's Fan and Lin, Alpha Drive One's Anxin and Arno, and Seeds)	2025	

== Videography ==
=== Music videos ===
Year	Title	Director	Length	Ref.
2023	"A.I.BAE"	Unknown	3:38	
2024	"Shinsekai·Tanjyou"	Unknown	3:08	

== Filmography ==
=== Television shows ===
Year	Title	Roles	Notes	Ref.
2023	Boys Planet	Contestant	Survival show; Finished 19th place	
2025	Perfect Singer 2	Contestant		

== Awards and nominations ==
Award ceremony	Year	Category	Result	Ref.
Weibo Music Awards	2023	Best New Singer Award	Won	
