= Ricky Shen =

Chinese singer (born 2004)

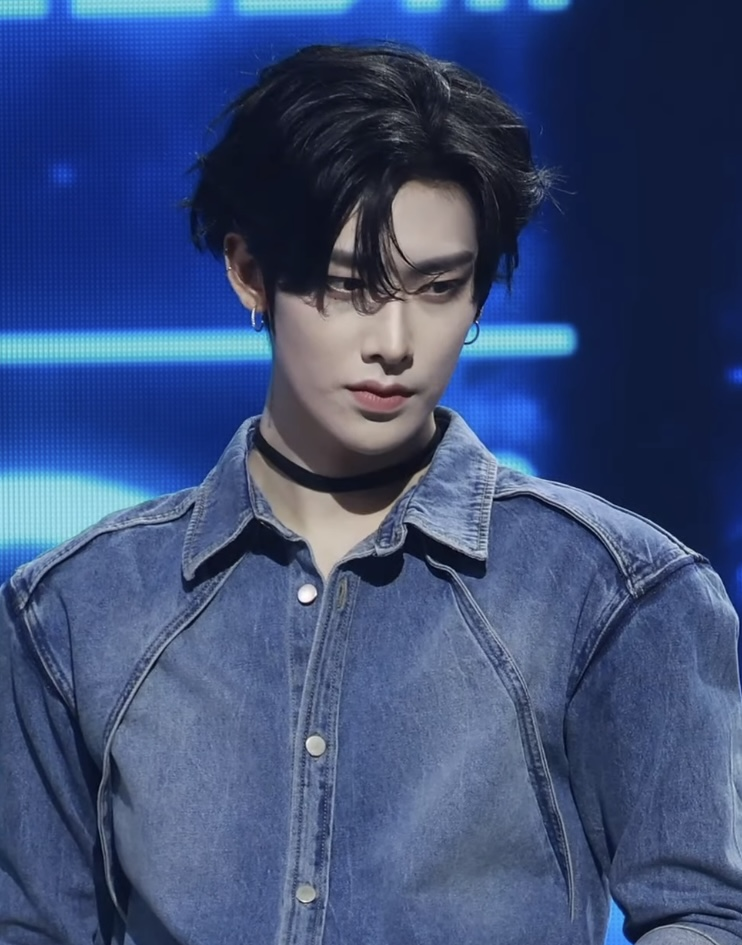
- Shen in 2025
- Born: Shen Quanrui; May 20, 2004 (age 22); Shanghai, China
- Education: Orange County School of the Arts
- Occupation: Singer
- Years active: 2022–present
- Musical career
- Genre: K-pop
- Instrument: Vocals
- Labels: YH; WakeOne (Note: As a member of Zerobaseone only); Lapone
- Member of: And2ble
- Formerly of: Zerobaseone

Chinese name
- Traditional Chinese: 沈泉銳
- Simplified Chinese: 沈泉锐
- Hanyu Pinyin: Shěn Quánruì

Shen Quanrui (Chinese: 沈泉锐; pinyin: Shěn Quánruì, born May 20, 2004), known professionally as Ricky Shen (Korean: 리키 셴) and also known mononymously as Ricky (Korean: 리키), is a Chinese singer based in South Korea. Signed under YH Entertainment, he was a member of the South Korean boy band Zerobaseone from its debut in July 2023 until his contract expired in March 2026. He re-debuted as a member of the boy group And2ble under YH Entertainment in 2026.

== Early life and education ==
Ricky was born on May 20, 2004, in Shanghai, China. He lived and studied in Los Angeles, California during his adolescence and attended Orange County School of the Arts, an experience he later discussed in interviews and local media pieces about his background.

At age nine, he attended Shanghai Yindu Artist College for acting and later trained at YH Entertainment for two years and two months prior to participating in Boys Planet.

== Career ==
=== 2022–2026: Boys Planet and debut with Zerobaseone ===
On December 29, 2022, Ricky was publicly revealed as one of the contestants on Mnet's reality competition show Boys Planet. During the show's premiere and early stages he participated in group and mission performances, representing YH Entertainment among the global trainees. On April 20, 2023, Ricky ranked 4th in the final episode with 1,572,089 points, earning a place in the final lineup of the project group Zerobaseone. The group officially debuted under WakeOne with the EP Youth in the Shade on July 10, 2023, launching their promotions as a nine-member project group.

In June 2024, Ricky appeared on the Chinese variety show Keep Running with fellow member Zhang Hao, marking one of his first Chinese television appearances since debuting with the group. He was then featured on the July cover of the magazine Madame Figaro Hommes China. In January 2025, Ricky appeared on beauty YouTuber Risabae's channel, gaining attention for his "webtoon-like" visuals in multiple Korean entertainment write-ups.

On January 12, 2026, YH Entertainment announced that Ricky would depart from Zerobaseone and continue his activities under YH Entertainment following the expiration of his contract with WakeOne Entertainment, alongside his labelmates and fellow Zerobaseone members Zhang Hao, Kim Gyu-vin, and Han Yu-jin. It was further stated that their contracts had been extended until March 15 to allow them to conclude their encore performances and final group activities. On March 15, the group held their final concert as a nine-piece ensemble, officially concluding Ricky's activities with Zerobaseone, along with Zhang Hao, Kim Gyu-vin, and Han Yu-jin.

=== 2026–present: Re-debut with And2ble ===
On May 26, 2026, Ricky re-debuted in the boy group And2ble under YH Entertainment with three former bandmates—Zhang Hao, Kim Gyu-vin, and Han Yu-jin—and former Evnne member Yoo Seung-eon.

== Other ventures ==
=== Endorsements ===
Ricky has been active in endorsement work and brand campaigns in Greater China and internationally. In October 2024, he was announced as an ambassador for the Chinese skincare brand Uniskin, and later, in October 2024, he was named ambassador for the Chinese personal care brand Kato-Kato according to Korean entertainment reports covering his commercial endorsements.

In July 2025, Urban Decay announced him as an ambassador.

On May 6, 2026, global skincare brand Ble de Fonty announced him as an ambassador.

Ricky has also been linked with international fashion and cosmetics brands through appearances and ambassador roles reported in fashion and entertainment press.

=== Fashion ===
Ricky attended Gucci's Ancora Celebration in Shanghai as a "Friend of the House" in March 2024, an appearance covered in fashion press and lifestyle outlets. He has also appeared in the cover of Madame Figaro China.

== Filmography ==
=== Television shows ===
| Year | Title | Role | Notes | Ref. |
|---|---|---|---|---|
| 2023 | Boys Planet | Contestant | Finished in 4th place | |
