= China Fashion Week =

Recurring fashion event in Beijing

- Genre: Clothing and fashion exhibitions
- Frequency: Semi-annually, twice a year
- Locations: Beijing, China
- Inaugurated: 1997
- Organiser: Mercedes-Benz Fashion Weeks worldwide
- Website: www.chinafashionweek.org.cn

China Fashion Week is an international fashion event held twice a year at various venues in Beijing, China. The event originated in 1997 and hosts professional contests, exhibitions, fashion forums and professional evaluations. The event showcases fashion collections from various designers, including ready-to-wear, accessories, styling and other new designs. The dates for Fashion Week, in March and October, are determined by the China Fashion Federation.

China Fashion Week was previously called "First China Fashion Week". When it first began, China Fashion Week was less critical of the seasonal concept of the event. Over the years as the event went on, the showing of “ready-to-wear” clothes and designer clothes were split into two sections. One section changed to March and the other to November.

To date, 959 fashion shows have been held in Beijing where over 3200 designers and models have contributed from countries such as Japan, Korea, Singapore, France, Italy, United States, Russia, Britain, Switzerland, Netherlands and Sweden.

== Fashion Awards ==
The China Fashion Week Fashion Awards consist of four award categories:

- Designer Awards—includes the "Best Fashion Designer" and "Top Ten Fashion Designer" awards.
- Fashion Model Awards—includes the "Best Fashion Model" and "Top Ten Fashion Model" awards.
- Fashion Elite Awards—includes the "Best Fashion Photographer", "Best Fashion Commentator" and "Best Stylist" awards.
- Brand Awards

== Previous Fashion Week Themes ==
- 2014 Pollution Chic—Fashion designers incorporated pollution-blocking masks into their designs and runway shows.
- 2013: Crazy Eye Makeup—China's most famous makeup artist, Mao Geping, created faux eyebrows made of unconventional materials as part of his MGPIN Collection. These materials included metallic pyramid studs, gold-plated and crystal-rope jewelry, and bronze trinkets resembling the innards of a grandfather clock.
- 2012: Tang Jing—(The Tang Dynasty): Spring/Summer Week in 2012 combined the past with the present to feature traditional Chinese embroidery and replicas of attire from the Tang Dynasty blended with modern Haute Couture designs. Models showed off long gowns in bright colors, some using techniques and styles often seen in the Tang Dynasty, AD 618 to AD 907.

== 2014 Sponsors ==
China National Garment Association (CNGA): Founded in 1991, CNGA is a self-regulated, non-profit organization engaged in China's garment industry and is China's first national trade association at the 4A level.

Mercedes-Benz:: In 2011, China International Fashion Week and luxury car brand leader. They established a strategic partnership. China International Fashion Week has listed China Fashion Week in Mercedes-Benz Fashion Weeks worldwide. In October 2014, the China International Fashion Week (Spring-Summer 2015) was held in Beijing.

== See also ==
- Berlin Fashion Week
- London Fashion Week
- Milan Fashion Week
- New York Fashion Week
- StyleHaul
