= Sung Han-bin =

South Korean singer (born 2001)

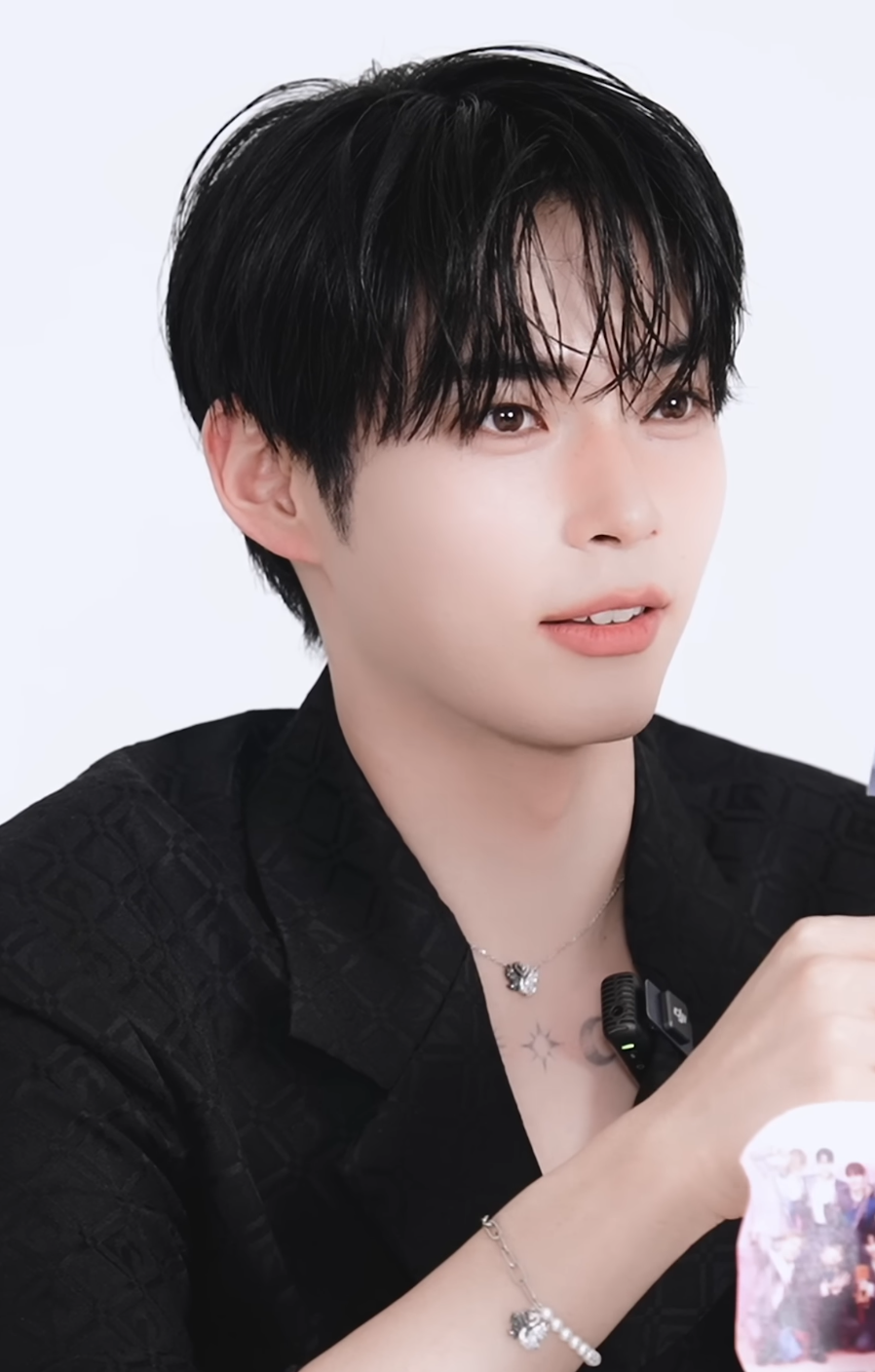
- Sung in May 2025
- Born: June 13, 2001 (age 25); Cheonan, South Korea
- Education: Dong-ah Institute of Media and Arts
- Occupations: Singer; dancer
- Musical career
- Genre: K-pop
- Instrument: Vocals
- Years active: 2022–present
- Labels: Studio Gl1de; The L1ve; WakeOne (Note: As a member of Zerobaseone only.); Lapone
- Member of: Zerobaseone

Korean name
- Hangul: 성한빈
- RR: Seong Hanbin
- MR: Sŏng Hanbin

Sung Han-bin (Korean: 성한빈; born June 13, 2001) is a South Korean singer and dancer. He is best known for competing on the Mnet reality competition show Boys Planet, where he ranked second in the final episode, making him a member of Zerobaseone.

== Early life and education ==
Sung was born on June 13, 2001, in Cheonan, South Chungcheong Province. He has a sister four years younger than him. With a background in street dance, Sung specializes in waacking and tutting, which he began participating in competitions for during high school. Prior to joining Studio GL1DE, Sung trained at Cube Entertainment. There, he developed a close friendship with fellow trainee Seok Matthew, who later competed alongside him on Boys Planet and debuted with Zerobaseone. During this period, he also worked at his mother's café and obtained a barista license.

Sung began his career as a backup dancer while still in high school. In 2018, he performed as part of a dance crew with Wanna One for their song "Boomerang" at the SBS Gayo Daejeon. The following year, he took the stage again as a backup dancer for BTS during their performance of "Dionysus" at the 2019 Mnet Asian Music Awards.

Sung graduated from Dong-ah Institute of Media and Arts on January 3, 2024.

== Career ==
=== 2022–present: Boys Planet and Zerobaseone ===
On December 29, 2022, Sung was revealed as a contestant on Mnet's reality competition show Boys Planet, where he also served as the center for K-Group in the performance of the show's theme song, "Here I Am". The program aired from February 2 to April 20, 2023. As a representative of both Studio Gl1de and The L1ve, Sung showcased a solo vocal and dance performance of ONF's "Beautiful Beautiful" for his initial evaluation.

On April 20, 2023, Sung placed second on Boys Planet with a total of 1,888,414 points, securing his debut in South Korean boy group Zerobaseone (abbreviated as ZB1). He was later chosen as the group's leader on May 11, 2023. Zerobaseone officially debuted under WakeOne Entertainment with the EP Youth in the Shade on July 10, 2023.

On September 1, 2023, Sung was announced as the new host of Mnet's M Countdown, joining existing host Miyeon. For his debut broadcast, he delivered a special stage performance of Taeyeon's "INVU".

Due to his distinctive background and extensive experience in tutting, Sung is widely referred to as "K-pop's First Tutting Idol." His prominence in this dance style has been credited with contributing to the growing incorporation of tutting in K-pop choreography. In July 2024, he was selected as "Artist of the Month" by Mnet's Studio Choom, a series that highlights performers recognized for their exceptional dance skills. As part of the feature, Sung released a dance performance emphasizing his tutting technique, accompanied by an original song titled "Bad Boy."

Since 2024, Sung has actively hosted a variety of events, including award shows, music festivals, and survival programs. He served as MC for individual days at both 2024 KCON Japan and KCON Hong Kong. Notably, he made history by becoming the first person to host all three days of the festival at 2025 KCON Japan. On June 6, 2024, he was named the new host for I-Land 2, which concluded with the debut of the seven-member girl group Izna. On March 26, 2025, Sung was also announced as the new host of Mnet's female dance crew competition show World of Street Woman Fighter. In addition to hosting, he recorded the show's opening theme song, titled "Champion."

On September 2, 2025, it was announced that after one year and eight months Sung would step down from his position on M Countdown along with co-host Myung Jae-hyun. His final broadcast was on September 4, during which Sung and Myung performed Lee Mujin's "청춘만화 (Coming of Age Story)" as their departing stage.

=== 2026–present: Continued activities and solo endeavors ===
In 2026, Zerobaseone entered a new phase of activities following the conclusion of its initial project period. After discussions between the members and their respective agencies, the group was reorganized as a five-member unit, with four members concluding their participation and pursuing separate activities. Alongside his continued activities with the group, Sung's individual activities came to be managed under The L1ve, which confirmed that he would promote concurrently as a member of Zerobaseone and through individual endeavors.

On February 20, 2026, Sung was announced as the first global ambassador for KCON. In this role, he represents the festival across its global events and promotional initiatives.

On September 7, it was announced that Sung would make his solo debut on October 12 with the EP Dead:Alive, with the lead single "Undead".

== Other ventures ==
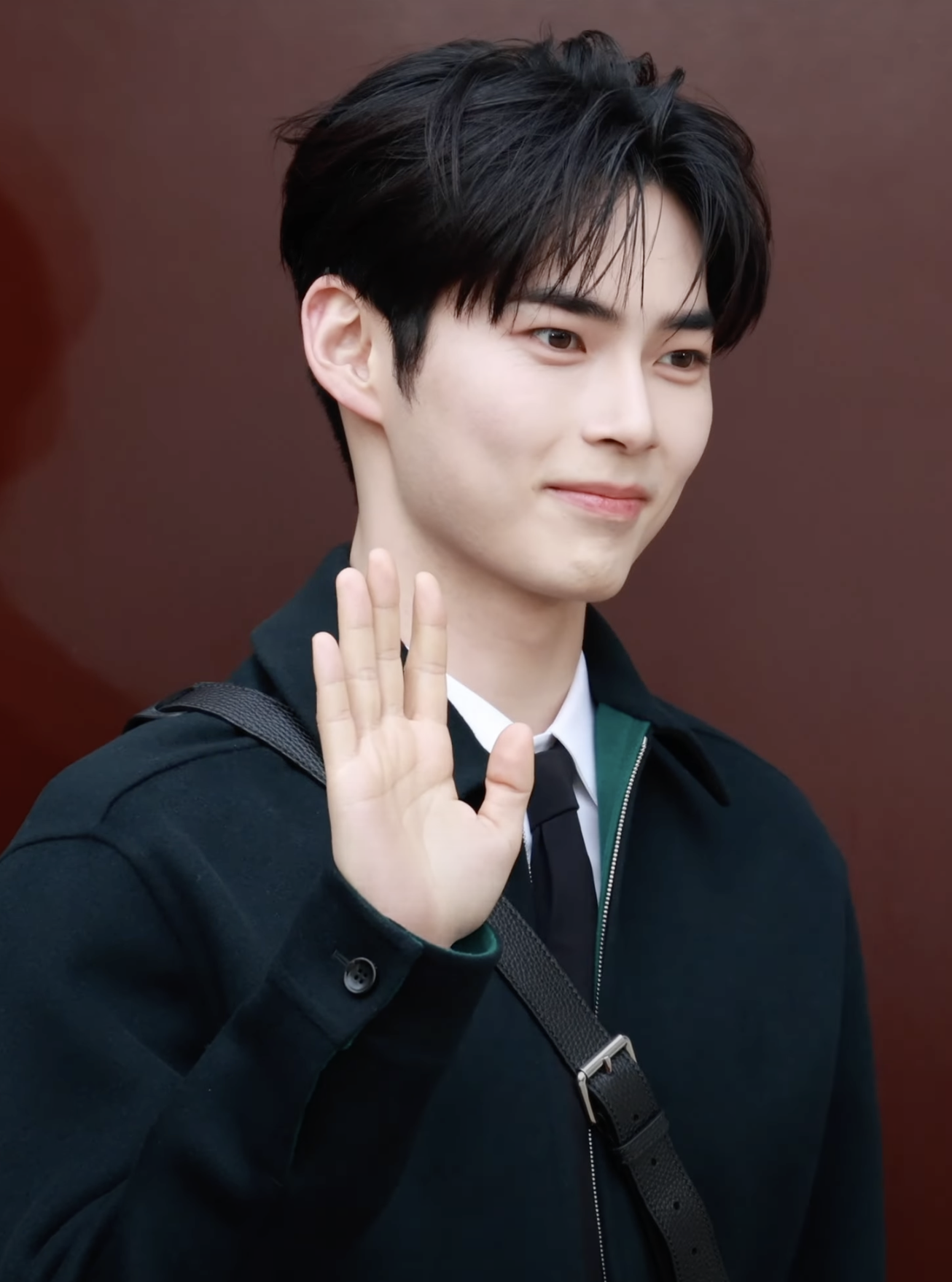
Sung at a pop-up event for Gucci in March 2024

Beyond his musical career with Zerobaseone, Sung has expanded his influence through a range of ventures, including brand endorsements, fashion collaborations, and philanthropic initiatives.

=== Endorsements and collaborations ===
Year	Brand	Category	Title(s)	Ref.
2024	Gucci	Italian fashion label	Friend of the House	
2025	Björk & Berries	Swedish botanical perfume brand	Muse	
2025	SNP	Korean clinical skincare brand	Brand Ambassador	
2025	Swarovski	Austrian jewelry brand	Global Brand Model	
2026	Swarovski	Austrian jewelry brand	Brand Ambassador	
2026	KCON	International music festival	Global Ambassador	
2026	Wonderbath	Lifestyle beauty brand	Brand Ambassador	
2026	Giverny	Korean cosmetic brand	Brand Ambassador	

Beginning in 2024, Sung has participated in multiple events hosted by both Gucci and Swarovski. In 2025, he collaborated with Björk & Berries on the South Korean launch of their "Ros" fragrance, which was released in special packaging to coincide with his birthday.

=== Fashion ===
Sung debuted as a runway model for Miss Gee Collection at Seoul Fashion Week in 2024 and returned in 2025 to open the show. He has also appeared on the covers of several fashion magazines, including Allure Korea, High Cut, Marie Claire Korea, and OK! China.

=== Philanthropy ===
Sung has participated in various philanthropic activities. In 2023 and 2024, he took part in the "Love Your W" campaign, a charity initiative organized by W Korea to raise awareness and funds for breast cancer treatment. In July 2026, Sung donated ₩100 million (US$74,611.5) to the Korean Committee for Good Neighbors to help the children freely dream their future without giving up due to economic difficulties.

== Discography ==
=== Extended plays ===
List of extended plays, showing selected details, selected chart positions, and sales figures
Title	Details	Peak chart positions		Sales
Title	Details	KOR	JPN	Sales
Dead:Alive	Released: October 12, 2026; Label: The L1ve; Formats: CD, digital download, streaming	6	45	KOR: 130,786; JPN: 871

=== Singles ===
List of singles, showing year released, and name of the album
Title	Year	Peak chart positions	Album
Title	Year	KOR	Album
"Bad Boy"	2024	—	Non-album single (Note: Original song for Sung Han-bin's July 2024 Artist of the Month performance.)
"Undead"	2026	23	Dead:Alive
"—" denotes releases that did not chart or were not released in that region.

=== Soundtrack appearances ===
List of soundtrack appearances, showing year released, selected chart positions, and name of the album
Title	Year	Peak chart positions	Album
Title	Year	KOR	Album
"Luv Luv Luv" (with Jo Yu-ri)	2023	— (Note: "Luv Luv Luv" did not enter the Circle Digital Chart, but peaked at number 46 on the Circle Download Chart.)	My Lovely Liar OST Part 5
"Champion"	2025	108	World of Street Woman Fighter OST
"You Are Spring" (너란 봄)	2026	103	Spring Fever OST
"—" denotes releases that did not chart or were not released in that region.

== Videography ==
=== Music videos ===
Title	Year	Director(s)	Ref.
"Undead"	2026	Cho Gi-seok	

=== Other videos ===
Title	Year	Director(s)	Notes	Ref.
"Killin' Me"	2026	Jan' Qui	Performance video	

== Filmography ==
=== Television shows ===
Year	Title	Role	Note(s)	Ref.
2023	Boys Planet	Contestant	Finished second place as a member of Zerobaseone	
2024	I-Land 2: N/a	Storyteller	Part 2	
2025	World of Street Woman Fighter	Host	Season 5	
2025	Boys II Planet	Special Mentor		
2026	Street World Fighter: Director's War	Host		

=== Web shows ===
Year	Title	Role	Ref.
2023	Blossom with Love	Panelist	

=== Hosting ===
Year	Title	Note(s)	Ref.
2023	M Countdown in France		
2023	8th Asia Artist Awards	with Kang Daniel and Jang Won-young	
2023–2025	M Countdown	with Miyeon (2023), Sohee (2024–2025), and Myung Jae-hyun (2024–2025)	
2024	2024 KCON Japan	with Park Gun-wook (Day 2)	
2024	2024 KCON Hong Kong	with Zhang Hao (Day 2)	
2024	9th Asia Artist Awards	with Jang Won-young and Ryu Jun-yeol	
2025	Mnet 30th Chart Show	with Miyeon, Shuhua, Leeteuk, and Joohoney	
2025	2025 KCON Japan	with Park Gun-wook (Day 1), Myung Jae-hyun (Day 2), and Bang Jee-min (Day 3)	
2025	2025 KCON Los Angeles	with Seok Matthew (Day 1), Ricky (Day 2), and Zhang Hao (Day 3)	
2026	2026 KCON Japan	Storyteller	
2026	ACON 2026		
2026	11th Asia Artist Awards	with Jang Won-young and Ji Chang-wook	
