= Boys Planet =

2023 South Korean reality competition show

- Genre: Reality competition
- Created by: Mnet
- Directed by: Kim Shin-young; Go Jeong-gyeong
- Presented by: Hwang Min-hyun; Sunmi; Yeo Jin-goo; Lee Min-hyuk; Key; Jo Kwon; Jeon Somi; Kim Jae-hwan
- Music by: Park Seung-seon; Kim Jong-woo
- Opening theme: "Here I Am" by Boys Planet contestants
- Ending theme: "Not Alone" by Boys Planet finalists
- Country of origin: South Korea
- Original language: Korean
- No. of episodes: 12 (list of episodes)

Production
- Executive producer: Park Chan-wook
- Producer: Shin Joon-bum
- Running time: 121–172 minutes
- Production companies: CJ ENM; NCSoft; Studio Take One (Note: A subsidiary of CJ ENM)

Original release
- Network: Mnet
- Release: February 2 – April 20, 2023

Related
- Girls Planet 999 (2021); Boys II Planet (2025)

Boys Planet

Chinese name
- Traditional Chinese: 少年星球
- Simplified Chinese: 少年星球
Transcriptions
Standard Mandarin
- Hanyu Pinyin: Shàonián Xīngqiú

Korean name
- Hangul: 보이즈 플래닛
Transcriptions
- Revised Romanization: Boiseu Peullaenit
- McCune–Reischauer: Poijŭ P'ŭllaenit

Japanese name
- Kana: ボーイズプラネット
Transcriptions
- Romanization: Bōizu Puranetto
- Nihon-shiki: Bôizu Puranetto

Boys Planet (Korean: 보이즈 플래닛) is a 2023 South Korean reality competition show created by Mnet. It aired on Mnet from February 2, 2023, to April 20, 2023, every Thursday at 20:50 (KST). Out of thousands of applicants, 98 contestants from various backgrounds were selected for the show. They were then equally split into two groups: K-Group and G-Group. In the finale on April 20, 2023, which was broadcast live, the show announced the final nine members who would debut as Zerobaseone (abbreviated as ZB1).

The show serves as a sequel to Girls Planet 999, this time featuring all male contestants.

== Concept and format ==
Boys Planet used a space theme: the two groups of contestants, K-Group and G-Group, acted as "planets" and the show's hosts were dubbed "Star Masters". Under the guidance of seven "Masters", contestants had to go through several rounds of evaluation, during which they had to show off their skills in singing, dancing, and rapping. After each round, the audience, known as "Star Creators", voted for their favorite trainees, determining the final debut line-up.

While its predecessor, Girls Planet 999, limited applications to South Korea, Japan, China, and Taiwan, the regions were expanded this season to allow for international participation.

Trainees were cast through two rounds of applications, the first lasting from December 11, 2021, to February 11, 2022, and the second from June 27, 2022, to August 21. The final contestants were chosen regardless of nationality, affiliation with an agency, or prior experience and professional history as a singer. Ultimately, 98 contestants were selected from 84 countries and regions, including South Korea, other parts of Asia, Europe, North and South America, and the Middle East, and 229 management agencies. The aim of the competition was to debut a new nine-member K-pop boy group consisting of trainees from all around the globe, making them the first 5th generation K-pop group.

=== Voting system ===
The Mnet Plus mobile app was the official platform used for voting and accessing content related to the contestants. Unlike Girls Planet 999, where viewers had to separately cast votes for each regional group, the votes were allocated to individual contestants and equally split between the two regional groups (K-Group and G-Group). The voting system was audited by Samil PwC, an external agency, to ensure transparency and fairness in voting-related processes from aggregation to the results.

== Promotion and broadcast ==
On December 11, 2021, during the 2021 Mnet Asian Music Awards, Mnet revealed that they would release a male version of Girls Planet 999 called Boys Planet in 2022. However, due to production issues, the air date was later pushed back to early 2023.

On November 28, Mnet announced that it would unveil the first teaser video for Boys Planet at the 2022 MAMA Awards. The show's premiere date of February 2, 2023, was confirmed through a teaser photo released on December 21, 2022.

The theme song, "Here I Am" (Korean: 난 빛나) was released on December 29, 2022, accompanied by a performance of the song on M Countdown, revealing Sung Han-bin of K-Group and Zhang Hao of G-Group as the centers of their respective groups. The contestants' profiles were released the same day. The following day, a special preview episode titled Boys Planet: Star Is Born was broadcast, featuring dance masters Baek Koo-young and Choi Young-joon, former Wanna One members Yoon Ji-sung and Kim Jae-hwan, former Iz*One members Kwon Eun-bi and Choi Ye-na, as well as all current members of Kep1er.

The show was simultaneously broadcast through Mnet and TVING in South Korea; AbemaTV and Mnet Japan in Japan; AfreecaTV in Vietnam, Thailand, and Indonesia; tvN Asia in Southeast Asia; and was available for streaming on Viki and Viu in selected regions, and through Mnet's YouTube channel, Mnet K-Pop, in the rest of the world.

On March 27, 2023, it was confirmed that the Boys Planet contestants would be part of the line-up at KCON Japan 2023 on May 12. A press conference for the remaining 28 contestants was held at CJ ENM Center on March 29. A special episode entitled Pajama Party in Planet Camp (Korean: 파자마 파티 in Planet Camp) was aired on April 15, 2023, at 20:00 KST.

The finale was held live at Jamsil Arena on April 20, 2023, with an audience of about 6,000 people. Additionally, the episode was broadcast live on YouTube and at eleven CJ CGV theaters across South Korea, with tickets for the theatrical screenings selling out in two minutes.

=== Broadcast schedule ===
| Season | Episodes | | Originally released | | Time slot |
| Season | Episodes | | First released | Last released | Time slot |
|---|---|---|---|---|---|
| 1 | 12 | 2 | February 2, 2023 | February 9, 2023 | Thursday at 20:00 (KST) |
| 1 | 12 | 10 | February 16, 2023 | April 20, 2023 | Thursday at 20:50 (KST) |

== Cast ==
Instead of having one host present the show for its entire run, it was presented by "Star Masters", which rotated with each round. Star Masters were usually experienced celebrities, who could give advice to and guide the trainees.

The first round was presented by former NU'EST and Wanna One member Hwang Min-hyun as the first Star Master, with Sunmi temporarily joining him as the second Star Master in episode 2. Actor Yeo Jin-goo hosted a special episode titled 1st Survivor Announcement Ceremony (Korean: 1차 생존자 발표식) as the third Star Master on February 24, 2023, as well as episode 5. Minhyuk of BtoB joined the show as the fourth Star Master for the second mission and as the host of the 2nd Survivor Announcement Ceremony (Korean: 2차 생존자 발표식). Shinee's Key joined the show as the fifth Star Master for the third mission. In episode 10, 2AM's Jo Kwon became the sixth Star Master for a special "Musical Star Test". Jeon Somi hosted the 3rd Survivor Announcement Ceremony (Korean: 3차 생존자 발표식) as the seventh Star Master on April 7, 2023, and also appeared in episode 11. Soloist and former Wanna One member Kim Jae-hwan served as the eighth Star Master for the final mission. Hwang Min-hyun reprised his role as a Star Master for the show's finale.

The rest of the mentors, also dubbed as "masters", were:

- Dance Masters:
  - Baek Koo-young (백구영)
  - Choi Young-joon (최영준)
  - Lip J (립제이)
- Vocal Masters:
  - Heo Sol-ji (허솔지)
  - Lee Seok-hoon (이석훈)
  - Lim Han-byul (임한별)
- Rap Masters:
  - pH-1 (피에이치원)
  - Lil Boi (Ep. 3–4) (릴보이)
  - Bobby (Ep. 6–7) (바비)

== Contestants ==
There were a total of 98 contestants participating in the competition. 49 were Korean, while the other 49 were from Canada, China, Japan, Taiwan, Thailand, the United States, and Vietnam.

The English names of contestants are presented in accordance with the official website.

Color key (In order of contestant's group rank on the show)

| Final members of Zerobaseone |
| Contestants eliminated in the final episode |
| Contestants eliminated in the third elimination round |
| Contestants eliminated in the second elimination round |
| Contestants eliminated in the first elimination round |
| Contestants that left the show |

98 Contestants
K-Group (South Korea)
| Sung Han-bin (성한빈) | Park Gun-wook (박건욱) | Kim Tae-rae (김태래) | Kim Gyu-vin (김규빈) | Kim Ji-woong (김지웅) |
| Han Yu-jin (한유진) | Park Han-bin (박한빈) | Lee Hoe-taek (이회택) | Kum Jun-hyeon (금준현) | Lee Jeong-hyeon (이정현) |
| Yoo Seung-eon (유승언) | Yoon Jong-woo (윤종우) | Cha Woong-ki (차웅기) | Lee Seung-hwan (이승환) | Seo Won (서원) |
| Mun Jung-hyun (문정현) | Park Ji-hoo (박지후) | Oh Sung-min (오성민) | Lee Ye-dam (이예담) | Jung Min-gyu (정민규) |
| Lim Jun-seo (임준서) | Ji Yun-seo (지윤서) | Lee Dong-yeol (이동열) | Park Do-ha (박도하) | Lee Da-eul (이다을) |
| Park Hyun-bin (박현빈) | Jeong I-chan (정이찬) | Choi Woo-jin (최우진) | Lee Dong-gun (이동건) | Lee Hwan-hee (이환희) |
| Choi Ji-ho (최지호) | Choi Seung-hun (최승훈) | Kim Min-seoung (김민성) | Han Seo-bin (한서빈) | Park Min-seok (박민석) |
| Jang Yeo-jun (장여준) | Jang Ji-ho (장지호) | Jung Ho-jin (정호진) | Jeon Woo-seok (전우석) | Park Gwan-young (박관영) |
| Jeon Ho-young (전호영) | Jung Se-yun (정세윤) | Kim Min-hyuk (김민혁) | Hong Keon-hee (홍건희) | Han Yu-seop (한유섭) |
| Jang Min-seo (장민서) | Jung Hwan-rok (정환록) | Jo Eun-woo (조은우) | Yeom Tae-gyun (염태균) | |
G-Group (Canada, China, Japan, Taiwan, Thailand, U.S., Vietnam)
| Zhang Hao (章昊/장하오) | Seok Matthew (석매튜) | Ricky (沈泉锐/리키) | Jay (제이) | Keita (佳汰/케이타) |
| Na Kamden (나캠든) | Wang Zihao (王子浩/왕즈하오) | Hiroto (大翔/히로토) | Haruto (晴翔/하루토) | Chen Kuanjui (陳冠叡/천관루이) |
| Ollie (刘天跃/올리) | Takuto (拓斗/타쿠토) | Zhang Shuaibo (张帅博/장슈아이보) | Ma Jingxiang (马靖翔/마징시앙) | Cai Jinxin (蔡锦昕/차이진신) |
| Anthonny (アントニー/안토니) | Wumuti (أمۇت/우무티) | Brian (何廷威/브라이언) | Chen Jianyu (陈建宇/천지안위) | Dang Hong Hai (Đặng Hồng Hải/당홍하이) |
| Cong (Công/콩) | Krystian (王南钧/크리스티안) | Yuki (由暉/유키) | Xuan Hao (宣淏/슈안하오) | Wen Yechen (文邺辰/웬예천) |
| Min (มิน/민) | Yutaka (豊/유타카) | Haru (暖琉/하루) | Chen Renyou (陳任佑/천런유) | Chen Liang (陈梁/천량) |
| Ouju (桜樹/오쥬) | Yang Jun (杨钧/양쥔) | Ichika (一翔/이치카) | Wang Yanhong (王颜宏/왕얀홍) | Nice (ไนซ์/나이스) |
| Dong Dong (东东/동동) | Winnie (วินนี่/위니) | Qiu Shengyang (邱勝揚/치우성양) | Chen Yugeng (陈誉庚/천위겅) | Osuke (央修/오스케) |
| Hyo (飛燿/효) | Kei (敬/케이) | Itsuki (樹/이츠키) | Toui (透唯/토우이) | Yuto (佑都/유토) |
| Riku (陸/리쿠) | Lin Shiyuan (林士元/린스위안) | Feng Junlan (冯俊岚/펑쥔란) | Tao Yuan (陶源/타오위안) | |

== Ranking ==
=== Top 9 ===
The top 9 contestants were chosen through popularity online voting through the Mnet Plus mobile app and audience live voting, as shown at the end of each episode.

Color key

| New Top 9 (Note: Indicates contestants who had never placed in the Top 9 in any prior elimination rounds or ranking announcements.) |
| Returned to Top 9 (Note: Indicates contestants who had placed in the Top 9 in a prior elimination round or ranking announcement, then had placed out of it, and then had come back) |

List of Top 9 contestants
| # | Ep. 1 | Ep. 2 | Ep. 5 | Ep. 6 | Ep. 8 | Ep. 11 | Ep. 12 |
|---|---|---|---|---|---|---|---|
| 1 | Sung Han-bin | Sung Han-bin | Sung Han-bin | Sung Han-bin | Sung Han-bin | Sung Han-bin | Zhang Hao (▲1) |
| 2 | Kim Ji-woong | Han Yu-jin (▲1) | Seok Matthew (▲3) | Han Yu-jin (▲2) | Zhang Hao (▲2) | Zhang Hao | Sung Han-bin (▼1) |
| 3 | Han Yu-jin | Kim Ji-woong (▼1) | Kim Ji-woong | Seok Matthew (▼1) | Han Yu-jin (▼1) | Kim Ji-woong (▲2) | Seok Matthew (▲6) |
| 4 | Lee Da-eul | Kim Gyu-vin (▲1) | Han Yu-jin (▼2) | Zhang Hao (▲1) | Seok Matthew (▼1) | Kim Tae-rae (▲3) | Ricky (▲4) |
| 5 | Kim Gyu-vin | Seok Matthew (▲27) | Zhang Hao (▲2) | Kim Ji-woong (▼2) | Kim Ji-woong | Han Yu-jin (▼2) | Park Gun-wook (▲7) |
| 6 | Lee Hoe-taek | Lee Hoe-taek | Kim Gyu-vin (▼2) | Kim Gyu-vin | Kim Gyu-vin | Keita (▲2) | Kim Tae-rae (▼2) |
| 7 | Zhang Hao | Zhang Hao | Lee Hoe-taek (▼1) | Kim Tae-rae (▲4) | Kim Tae-rae | Kim Gyu-vin (▼1) | Kim Gyu-vin |
| 8 | Anthonny | Jay (▲22) | Keita (▲6) | Keita | Keita | Ricky (▲6) | Kim Ji-woong (▼5) |
| 9 | Kim Tae-rae | Lee Da-eul (▼5) | Jay (▼1) | Jay | Park Gun-wook (▲2) | Seok Matthew (▼5) | Han Yu-jin (▼4) |

=== First voting period ===
Boys Planet 1st Global Top 9 contestants.

The first voting period took place from February 2 to 24, 2023.

Star Creators voted for nine boys regardless of their group. In total, 52,434,522 votes from 176 countries were recorded. Roughly 11.9 million of these votes were cast by Koreans, while 40.5 million came from global viewers.

Eliminations were based on individual total points.

Color key

| Top 9 |

1st Survival Announcement results
| Rank | Contestants | Group | Votes | | Points (Note: Points were calculated using this formula: [Number of Korean Votes × (Overall Total Votes ÷ Total Korean Votes)] + [Number of International Votes × (Overall Total Votes ÷ Total International Votes)].) | Rank | Contestants | Group | Votes | | Points |
| Rank | Contestants | Group | Korean | Global | Points | Rank | Contestants | Group | Korean | Global | Points |
|---|---|---|---|---|---|---|---|---|---|---|---|
| 1 | Sung Han-bin | K | 1,043,564 | 2,818,836 | 8,343,418 | 27 | Jung Min-gyu | K | 153,454 | 208,559 | 1,054,053 |
| 2 | Seok Matthew | G | 838,865 | 2,470,738 | 6,983,610 | 28 | Ollie | G | 57,483 | 616,473 | 1,050,683 |
| 3 | Kim Ji-woong | K | 848,515 | 2,400,044 | 6,944,462 | 29 | Wang Zihao | G | 31,866 | 617,231 | 1,039,147 |
| 4 | Han Yu-jin | K | 924,664 | 1,997,419 | 6,757,634 | 30 | Lim Jun-seo | K | 154,069 | 174,791 | 1,016,985 |
| 5 | Zhang Hao | G | 594,480 | 2,259,107 | 5,636,185 | 31 | Na Kamden | G | 135,650 | 283,288 | 962,611 |
| 6 | Kim Gyu-vin | K | 783,359 | 1,514,108 | 5,511,180 | 32 | Ma Jingxiang | G | 118,148 | 250,791 | 843,660 |
| 7 | Lee Hoe-taek | K | 478,834 | 1,742,488 | 4,469,324 | 33 | Dang Hong Hai | G | 55,615 | 414,962 | 781,564 |
| 8 | Keita | G | 311,495 | 2,038,551 | 4,107,663 | 34 | Oh Sung-min | K | 96,616 | 174,879 | 760,796 |
| 9 | Jay | G | 343,093 | 1,988,046 | 4,081,057 | 35 | Cong | G | 67,052 | 355,367 | 754,636 |
| 10 | Park Gun-wook | K | 424,712 | 1,431,312 | 3,728,699 | 36 | Zhang Shuaibo | G | 100,017 | 226,367 | 732,400 |
| 11 | Kim Tae-rae | K | 572,660 | 686,987 | 3,514,786 | 37 | Krystian | G | 18,023 | 489,839 | 713,399 |
| 12 | Ricky | G | 121,057 | 1,228,473 | 2,122,327 | 38 | Yoon Jong-woo | K | 72,487 | 204,190 | 692,766 |
| 13 | Lee Da-eul | K | 268,805 | 627,749 | 2,103,468 | 39 | Lee Jeong-hyeon | K | 84,968 | 149,181 | 676,361 |
| 14 | Kum Jun-hyeon | K | 260,720 | 495,016 | 1,896,096 | 40 | Lee Dong-yeol | K | 66,411 | 202,621 | 664,047 |
| 15 | Takuto | G | 223,223 | 696,749 | 1,882,600 | 41 | Brian | G | 91,794 | 178,290 | 634,033 |
| 16 | Haruto | G | 89,646 | 1,058,396 | 1,764,148 | 42 | Lee Ye-dam | K | 54,356 | 219,178 | 632,536 |
| 17 | Yoo Seung-eon | K | 256,031 | 348,099 | 1,689,228 | 43 | Wumuti | G | 23,170 | 324,127 | 521,445 |
| 18 | Seo Won | K | 181,959 | 583,003 | 1,664,080 | 44 | Park Ji-hoo | K | 66,861 | 87,145 | 516,507 |
| 19 | Anthonny | G | 69,905 | 1,002,268 | 1,604,766 | 45 | Chen Jianyu | G | 47,722 | 230,991 | 508,693 |
| 20 | Lee Seung-hwan | K | 137,004 | 662,583 | 1,569,664 | 46 | Lee Hwan-hee | K | 63,688 | 168,531 | 507,947 |
| 21 | Hiroto | G | 95,458 | 743,432 | 1,381,864 | 47 | Ji Yun-seo | K | 49,239 | 78,759 | 428,248 |
| 22 | Park Han-bin | K | 151,471 | 426,785 | 1,327,899 | 48 | Lee Dong-gun | K | 13,200 | 169,339 | 387,236 |
| 23 | Mun Jung-hyun | K | 173,899 | 209,832 | 1,145,501 | 49 | Park Hyun-been | K | 39,237 | 72,877 | 376,700 |
| 24 | Bak Do-ha | K | 120,784 | 385,881 | 1,140,151 | 50 | Cai Jinxin | G | 61,109 | 82,301 | 374,970 |
| 25 | Cha Woong-ki | K | 136,790 | 329,584 | 1,137,561 | 51 | Choi Woo-jin | K | 20,040 | 100,778 | 368,077 |
| 26 | Chen Kuanjui | G | 50,877 | 538,204 | 1,059,856 | 52 | Jeong I-chan | K | 11,527 | 142,653 | 345,335 |

=== Second voting period ===
Boys Planet 2nd Global Top 9 contestants.

The second voting period took place from March 2 to 17, 2023.

Star Creators voted for six boys regardless of their group. In total, 47,586,404 votes from 178 countries were recorded. Roughly 10.5 million of these votes were cast by Koreans, while 37 million came from global viewers.

Eliminations were based on individual total points.

Color key

| Top 9 |

2nd Survival Announcement results
| Rank | Contestants | Group | Votes | | Points | Rank | Contestants | Group | Votes | | Points |
| Rank | Contestants | Group | Korean | Global | Points | Rank | Contestants | Group | Korean | Global | Points |
|---|---|---|---|---|---|---|---|---|---|---|---|
| 1 | Sung Han-bin | K | 864,631 | 2,360,757 | 7,043,213 | 15 | Yoon Jong-woo | K | 258,264 | 849,578 | 2,259,317 |
| 2 | Zhang Hao | G | 561,860 | 2,599,059 | 6,128,945 | 16 | Haruto | G | 77,203 | 1,440,154 | 2,198,036 |
| 3 | Han Yu-jin | K | 789,745 | 1,847,342 | 6,045,275 | 17 | Yoo Seung-eon | K | 300,794 | 452,115 | 1,941,578 |
| 4 | Seok Matthew | G | 529,478 | 2,583,500 | 5,812,430 | 18 | Seo Won | K | 160,956 | 620,298 | 1,624,641 |
| 5 | Kim Ji-woong | K | 686,209 | 1,983,266 | 5,751,211 | 19 | Wang Zihao | G | 36,624 | 1,039,895 | 1,600,605 |
| 6 | Kim Gyu-vin | K | 694,761 | 1,319,888 | 5,088,364 | 20 | Na Kamden | G | 200,211 | 390,565 | 1,507,389 |
| 7 | Kim Tae-rae | K | 716,438 | 1,206,278 | 4,790,626 | 21 | Lee Seung-hwan | K | 152,061 | 609,652 | 1,470,722 |
| 8 | Keita | G | 202,889 | 2,599,031 | 4,254,415 | 22 | Chen Kuanjui | G | 80,491 | 738,761 | 1,312,569 |
| 9 | Park Gun-wook | K | 338,834 | 1,242,684 | 3,228,542 | 23 | Zhang Shuaibo | G | 199,937 | 290,028 | 1,277,094 |
| 10 | Kum Jun-hyeon | K | 466,902 | 746,044 | 3,070,589 | 24 | Lee Jeong-hyeon | K | 185,150 | 270,625 | 1,185,270 |
| 11 | Lee Hoe-taek | K | 328,217 | 1,145,640 | 3,055,925 | 25 | Takuto | G | 127,763 | 465,513 | 1,175,739 |
| 12 | Jay | G | 137,997 | 1,751,677 | 2,872,951 | 26 | Cha Woong-ki | K | 126,418 | 416,876 | 1,107,219 |
| 13 | Park Han-bin | K | 319,978 | 795,702 | 2,719,441 | 27 | Ollie | G | 61,620 | 636,467 | 1,095,860 |
| 14 | Ricky | G | 233,522 | 1,215,285 | 2,616,791 | 28 | Hiroto | G | 78,994 | 560,757 | 1,077,299 |

=== Third voting period ===
Boys Planet 3rd Global Top 9 contestants.

The third voting period took place from March 23 to April 7, 2023.

Star Creators voted for three boys regardless of their group. In total, 31,750,293 votes from 182 countries were recorded. Roughly 6.35 million of these votes were cast by Koreans, while 25.4 million came from global viewers.

Eliminations were based on individual total points.

Color key

| Top 9 |

3rd Survival Announcement results
| Rank | Contestants | Group | Votes | | Points | Rank | Contestants | Group | Votes | | Points |
| Rank | Contestants | Group | Korean | Global | Points | Rank | Contestants | Group | Korean | Global | Points |
|---|---|---|---|---|---|---|---|---|---|---|---|
| 1 | Sung Han-bin | K | 641,077 | 1,748,576 | 5,389,363 | 10 | Lee Hoe-taek | K | 263,565 | 871,805 | 2,406,896 |
| 2 | Zhang Hao | G | 329,902 | 1,835,261 | 4,342,882 | 11 | Park Han-bin | K | 277,403 | 783,470 | 2,365,604 |
| 3 | Kim Ji-woong | K | 385,631 | 1,287,173 | 3,536,122 | 12 | Park Gun-wook | K | 227,208 | 954,454 | 2,329,809 |
| 4 | Kim Tae-rae | K | 483,920 | 881,110 | 3,519,583 | 13 | Jay | G | 62,829 | 1,400,608 | 2,264,984 |
| 5 | Han Yu-jin | K | 397,884 | 1,210,430 | 3,501,402 | 14 | Yoo Seung-eon | K | 329,368 | 477,070 | 2,242,196 |
| 6 | Keita | G | 94,012 | 2,079,095 | 3,069,047 | 15 | Yoon Jong-woo | K | 211,875 | 908,368 | 2,194,327 |
| 7 | Kim Gyu-vin | K | 407,240 | 785,674 | 3,017,119 | 16 | Kum Jun-hyeon | K | 293,395 | 577,185 | 2,187,613 |
| 8 | Ricky | G | 251,118 | 1,117,293 | 2,851,613 | 17 | Lee Jeong-hyeon | K | 260,595 | 431,541 | 2,041,636 |
| 9 | Seok Matthew | G | 207,736 | 1,343,815 | 2,718,044 | 18 | Na Kamden | G | 298,261 | 426,049 | 2,022,976 |

=== Result ===
Boys Planet Final Top 9 contestants.

The finale was held and broadcast live on April 20, 2023. Hwang Min-hyun announced that the name of the newly formed boy group would be Zerobaseone; abbreviated as ZB1.

Star Creators voted for one contestant regardless of his group. In total, 9,398,916 votes from 184 countries were recorded, comprising 8,177,501 votes cast from the first voting period, which took place from April 13 to April 19, 2023, and 1,221,415 votes cast during the second voting period, which was held live during the finale and where all votes were doubled.

Finale results
| Rank | Name | Group | Points | Company |
|---|---|---|---|---|
| 1 | Zhang Hao | G | 1,998,154 | Yuehua Entertainment |
| 2 | Sung Han-bin | K | 1,888,414 | Studio Gl1de |
| 3 | Seok Matthew | G | 1,702,174 | MNH Entertainment |
| 4 | Ricky | G | 1,572,089 | Yuehua Entertainment |
| 5 | Park Gun-wook | K | 1,386,039 | Jellyfish Entertainment |
| 6 | Kim Tae-rae | K | 1,349,595 | Wake One Entertainment |
| 7 | Kim Gyu-vin | K | 1,346,105 | Yuehua Entertainment |
| 8 | Kim Ji-woong | K | 1,338,984 | Nest Management |
| 9 | Han Yu-jin | K | 1,196,622 | Yuehua Entertainment |

== Episodes ==
| No. | Title | Original release date | South Korea viewers (millions) |
|---|---|---|---|
| 1 | "Hello, It's Me"; Transliteration: "Annyeong Na-ya" (Korean: 안녕 나야) | February 2, 2023 | N/A |
The episode begins with the first Star Master, Hwang Min-hyun, explaining the show's concept, followed by the show's contestants being introduced to the "Star Level Test". The Star Level Test involves the contestants rating their own skills out of four stars by placing stickers on their name tags, before being re-assessed by the show's mentors (known as Vocal, Dance, and Rap Masters) through performances. As a bonus, the group with the most stars following the Star Level Test earns the right to preview the show's theme song "Here I Am" a day earlier than the other group.
| 2 | "Here I Am"; Transliteration: "Nan Bitna" (Korean: 난 빛나) | February 9, 2023 | N/A |
The episode begins with the contestants reacting to the show's first episode alongside the second Star Master, Sunmi. The episode then proceeds with the continuation of the Star Level Test. In the end, the K-Group wins with 119 stars over G-Group's 98 stars. After moving into the dormitory (dubbed as "Planet Camp"), the contestants are introduced to the show's theme song "Here I Am" (난 빛나) and the accompanying "Signal Song Test". The Signal Song Test re-evaluates the contestants' star levels based on their performance of the theme song. The contestants practice the theme song with the help of the show's Masters.
| 3 | "Turn on the Light"; Transliteration: "Bureul Kyeojwo" (Korean: 불을 켜줘) | February 16, 2023 | 0.240 |
After the Signal Song Test is over, the trainees vote for a center to represent each group for the final "Here I Am" stage. Sung Han-bin is chosen as the center for K-Group and takes on the overall Killing Part, while Zhang Hao wins the center position for G-Group. The next day, Star Master Hwang Min-hyun announces their first mission: the "K vs. G Group Battle". The trainees with the most views for their signal song fancams get to pick their team members in order of popularity. Lee Hoe-taek and Dang Hong Hai ranked highest in their respective groups and get to choose first. Each of the seven mission songs will then be performed live by one team of each group and a live audience gets to vote individually for each team member. The winning group receives a benefit of 10,000 points and the team with the overall highest score gets a special stage on M Countdown.
| 4 | "SHOWTIME" | February 23, 2023 | 0.218 |
The K vs G Group Battle continues as the remaining nine teams rehearse and perform their respective songs. At the end of the performances, it is revealed that K-Group won the battle, and will therefore receive the 10,000 points benefit for the first ranking announcement. The winning team of the special performance on M Countdown is revealed to be the "Back Door" K-Group team (composed of Ji Yun-seo, Kim Tae-rae, Han Yu-jin, Kim Min-seong, Kum Jun-hyeon, Yoon Jong-woo, and Kim Ji-woong).
| 5 | "You and I"; Transliteration: "Neowa Na" (Korean: 너와 나) | March 2, 2023 | 0.204 |
The 1st Survival Announcement begins with the third Star Master Yeo Jin-goo as the host. Trainees ranked 12th to 51st are announced first before the Top 11 are revealed, starting from the bottom. Jay, Kim Tae-rae, and Park Gun-wook are announced as potential candidates for 9th place, with Jay ultimately securing the spot. Then, the top three contestants are unveiled: Sung Han-bin remains in first place with 8,343,418 points, followed by Seok Matthew with 6,983,610 points, and Kim Ji-woong in third place with 6,944,462 points. Lastly, Jeong I-chan manages to place 52nd and therefore remains in the competition. The episode ends with a preview of the next mission, called the "Dual Position Battle".
| 6 | "Take My Hand"; Transliteration: "Nae Soneul Jab-a" (Korean: 내 손을 잡아) | March 9, 2023 | 0.206 |
The trainees gather in the auditorium and the fourth Star Master Minhyuk reveals and explains the second mission. The Dual Position Battle starts and each contestant has to choose one of the twelve songs divided into the three categories "Vocal & Rap", "Vocal & Dance", and "Rap & Dance". Once a team hits its maximum number of members, higher-ranked trainees can replace lower-ranking trainees from the group to free up a spot for themselves. Contestants are urged to include a creative element in their performances, might it be changing parts of the choreography or writing new lyrics themselves. The winning team for each category will receive a point benefit, a special stage on M Countdown, and a promotional banner on the Mnet Plus app. The performances begin, with the "Gang" team performing first. The episode ends with the "Tomboy" team about to perform. The five songs created for the next mission, the "Artist Battle", are revealed and viewers get to choose each team's members through the Mnet Plus app.
| 7 | "Two is Better"; Transliteration: "Dul-i Deo Johjanh-a" (Korean: 둘이 더 좋잖아) | March 16, 2023 | 0.236 |
The remaining eight performances for the Dual Position Mission are revealed. Then the winning team for each category is announced: the "Tomboy" team places first in the Vocal & Rap category, the "Love Killa" team wins in the Vocal & Dance category, and the "LAW" team in the Rap & Dance category, securing 100,000 points for each member and a special M Countdown stage for the entire team. The highest-ranked members of each team, Zhang Hao, Kim Gyu-vin, and Park Han-bin, respectively, receive an additional 150,000 points on top of that.
| 8 | "As Much As I Dreamed"; Transliteration: "Kkumkkwowassdeon Mankeum" (Korean: 꿈꿔왔던 만큼) | March 23, 2023 | 0.278 |
Fifth Star Master Key explains the third mission to the contestants. All of the trainees are shown practicing for the song they got voted into by the audience but only the ones that remain after the second elimination will get to perform them. Then, the 2nd Survival Announcement begins. Trainees ranked 12th to 27th are announced first before the Top 11 are revealed, starting from the bottom. Lee Hoe-taek, Park Gun-wook, and Kum Jun-hyeon are announced as potential candidates for ninth place, with Park Gun-wook ultimately securing the spot. Then, the top three contestants are unveiled: Sung Han-bin ranks first once again with 7,043,213 points, followed by Zhang Hao with 6,128,945 points, and Han Yu-jin with 6,045,275 points. Lastly, Hiroto manages to remain in the competition by placing 28th.
| 9 | "Started to Realize"; Transliteration: "Jagakhagi Sijakhan" (Korean: 자각하기 시작한) | March 30, 2023 | 0.241 |
After the second elimination, the remaining contestants have to re-adjust their Artist Battle teams to fit the intended total of members. Every team that has too many members left needs to vote out a certain amount of trainees, who then have to switch teams to fill the empty spots. The new teams are then shown practicing and preparing for their performances. In a special intermittent segment, the contestants get to perform their respective songs for their families and friends. Then, the first two performances, "SuperCharger" and "En Garde", are shown. The episode ends with the "Say My Name" team about to perform.
| 10 | "Nonstop Mindset"; Transliteration: "Ma-eum-eun Nonstop" (Korean: 마음은 Nonstop) | April 6, 2023 | 0.260 |
The remaining three performances for the Artist Battle, "Switch", "Say My Name", and "Over Me", are shown. After the performances, the winner is announced to be the "Over Me" team with a total of 621 points, thus winning the 200,000 points benefit, M Countdown special stage, and a mini fan meeting. With 852 points, Zhang Hao ranks first within the team and receives an additional benefit. The Star Creators are then reminded that only 18 contestants will make it to the final round and that voting will close in under 12 hours.
| 11 | "At a Higher Place"; Transliteration: "Deo Nop-eun Gos-eseo" (Korean: 더 높은 곳에서) | April 13, 2023 | 0.325 |
The 3rd Survival Announcement begins, hosted by the sixth Star Master Jeon Somi. Trainees ranked 11th to 17th are announced first before the Top 10 are revealed. Lee Hoe-taek and Seok Matthew are announced as potential candidates for 9th place, with Seok Matthew ultimately securing the spot. Then, the top three contestants are unveiled: Sung Han-bin once again ranks first with 5,389,363 points, followed by Zhang Hao with 4,342,882 points, and Kim Ji-woong with 3,536,122 points. Lastly, Na Kamden manages to place 18th and is therefore able to compete in the finale. We are then introduced to the seventh Star Master, Kim Jae-hwan, who announces the two songs for the final mission, "Jelly Pop" and "Hot Summer". While choosing which songs to perform, the higher-ranked trainees can push out lower-ranked trainees from the song or position they want for themselves. For this mission, the Star Creators get to decide the killing part. The episode ends with Sung Han-bin and Seok Matthew being announced as the temporary killing parts for "Hot Summer" and "Jelly Pop", respectively.
| 12 | "I Shine"; Transliteration: "Nan Bich-na" (Korean: 난 빛나) | April 20, 2023 | 0.338 |
The episode begins with a memorial title card for Astro's Moonbin, who had died a day before the broadcast. It then proceeds showing the final 18 contestants performing the theme song again, after which Star Master Hwang Min-hyun announces that the debut group's name is Zerobaseone (Korean: 제로베이스원; abbreviated as ZB1), and the second half of the final voting period is opened. The trainees are then shown practicing for their final stages and it is revealed that Zhang Hao replaced Seok Matthew as their team's killing part, while Sung Han-bin retained his position. "Jelly Pop" is performed, followed by "Hot Summer", after which the live voting is closed. Then, the trainees get on stage to perform their final song titled "Not Alone". Finally, the votes are tallied and the final members of the debut group are announced, starting from rank 8: Kim Ji-woong becomes the first official member of ZB1, followed by Kim Gyu-vin, Kim Tae-rae, Park Gun-wook, Ricky, and Seok Matthew. Sung and Zhang goes to the stage as candidates for first place, with Zhang ultimately overtaking Sung's rank for the first time and becomes the center of the debut group and also the first foreigner to win first place on any Mnet survival show. Lastly, Han Yu-jin is announced as the final member.

== Discography ==
=== Extended plays ===
List of extended plays, with selected chart positions and sales
| Title | Details | Peak chart positions | | | Sales |
| Title | Details | KOR | JPN Hot | JPN Comb. | Sales |
|---|---|---|---|---|---|
| Boys Planet – Artist Battle | Released: April 6, 2023; Label: Stone Music Entertainment; Formats: Digital download, streaming; Track list: 1. Switch; 2. SuperCharger; 3. Over Me; 4. Say My Name; 5. En Garde (준비, 시작!) | — | 6 | 12 | JPN: 2,481 (Dig.) |
| Boys Planet – Final TOP9 Battle | Released: April 21, 2023; Label: Stone Music Entertainment; Formats: Digital download, streaming; Track list: 1. Jelly Pop; 2. Hot Summer; 3. Not Alone | — | — | 31 | |

=== Singles ===
List of singles, showing year released, selected chart positions, and name of the album
| Title | Year | Peak chart positions | | Album |
| Title | Year | KOR | JPN Hot | Album |
|---|---|---|---|---|
| "Here I Am" (난 빛나) | 2023 | — (Note: "Here I Am" did not enter the Circle Digital Chart, but appeared at number 199 on the component Download chart.) | — | Non-album single |
| "Switch" | 2023 | — (Note: "Switch" did not enter the Circle Digital Chart, but appeared at number 65 on the component Download chart.) | — | Boys Planet – Artist Battle |
| "SuperCharger" | 2023 | — (Note: "SuperCharger" did not enter the Circle Digital Chart, but appeared at number 78 on the component Download chart.) | — | Boys Planet – Artist Battle |
| "Over Me" | 2023 | 179 | — (Note: "Over Me" did not enter Billboard Japan Hot 100 but peaked at number 87 on Billboard Japan Streaming Songs chart.) | Boys Planet – Artist Battle |
| "Say My Name" | 2023 | 58 | 77 | Boys Planet – Artist Battle |
| "En Garde" (준비, 시작!) | 2023 | 185 | — | Boys Planet – Artist Battle |
| "Jelly Pop" | 2023 | 162 | 99 | Boys Planet – Final TOP9 Battle |
| "Hot Summer" | 2023 | — (Note: "Hot Summer" did not enter the Circle Digital Chart, but appeared at number 113 on the component Download chart.) | — (Note: "Hot Summer" did not enter Billboard Japan Hot 100, but peaked at number 75 on the component Billboard Japan Download Songs chart.) | Boys Planet – Final TOP9 Battle |
| "Not Alone" | 2023 | — (Note: "Not Alone" did not enter the Circle Digital Chart, but appeared at number 123 on the component Download chart.) | — (Note: "Not Alone" did not enter Billboard Japan Hot 100, but peaked at number 77 on the component Billboard Japan Download Songs chart.) | Boys Planet – Final TOP9 Battle |
"—" denotes a recording that did not chart or was not released in that region.

== Viewership ==
Boys Planet : South Korea viewers per episode (thousands)

| Season | Episode number | | | | | | | | | | | | Average |
| Season | 1 | 2 | 3 | 4 | 5 | 6 | 7 | 8 | 9 | 10 | 11 | 12 | Average |
|---|---|---|---|---|---|---|---|---|---|---|---|---|---|
| 1 | N/A | N/A | 240 | 218 | 204 | 206 | 236 | 278 | 241 | 260 | 325 | 338 | 255 |

Source: Audience measurement performed nationwide by Nielsen Korea. (Note: The average viewership was calculated based on the published data. The exact average viewership is unknown due to multiple viewership ratings missing.)

Average TV viewership ratings
| Ep. | Original broadcast date | Average audience share (Nielsen Korea) | |
| Ep. | Original broadcast date | Nationwide | Seoul |
|---|---|---|---|
| 1 | February 2, 2023 | 0.379% (88th) | N/A |
| 2 | February 9, 2023 | 0.586% (51st) | N/A |
| 3 | February 16, 2023 | 0.821% (27th) | 1.195% (8th) |
| 4 | February 23, 2023 | 0.772% (27th) | 1% (NR) |
| 5 | March 2, 2023 | 0.803% (23rd) | 1% (NR) |
| 6 | March 9, 2023 | 0.724% (25th) | 1.067% (9th) |
| 7 | March 16, 2023 | 0.890% (21st) | 1.115% (7th) |
| 8 | March 23, 2023 | 0.884% (19th) | 1.110% (9th) |
| 9 | March 30, 2023 | 0.865% (17th) | 1.232% (9th) |
| 10 | April 6, 2023 | 0.878% (23rd) | 1.1% (NR) |
| 11 | April 13, 2023 | 1.000% (14th) | 1.396% (7th) |
| 12 | April 20, 2023 | 1.210% (6th) | 1.657% (4th) |
| Average | | 0.818% | 1.187% (Note: This average rating was calculated based on the published ratings. The exact average rating is unknown due to multiple ratings missing.) |
| Special | December 30, 2022 | N/A | N/A |
In the table below, the blue numbers represent the lowest ratings and the red numbers represent the highest ratings.; N/A denotes ratings that were not published.; NR denotes that the show did not rank in the top 10 daily programs on that date.; This show aired on a cable channel/pay TV which normally has a relatively smaller audience compared to free-to-air TV/public broadcasters (KBS, SBS, MBC and EBS).

== Awards and nominations ==
Name of the award ceremony, year presented, category, nominee of the award, and the result of the nomination
| Award ceremony | Year | Category | Nominee / Work | Result | Ref. |
|---|---|---|---|---|---|
| Asian Academy Creative Awards | 2023 | Best Music or Dance Programme (National Winners – Korea) | Boys Planet | Won | |

== Post-Competition ==
The final group, Zerobaseone, is managed by WakeOne. The group debuted on July 10, 2023, with the EP Youth in the Shade. Since then, they have released one studio album, seven EPs (five in Korean and two in Japanese) and two singles (one in Korean and one in Japanese). In February 2026, it was announced that the group would continue as a five-member ensemble with Kim Ji-woong, Sung Han-bin, Seok Matthew, Kim Tae-rae, and Park Gun-wook.

- Zhang Hao (1st), Ricky (4th), Kim Gyu-vin (7th), and Han Yu-jin (9th) left the group on March 15, 2026 following the expiration of their contracts and returned to YH Entertainment.
Other contestants, other activities
- Some contestants returned to their original groups:
  - Keita (12th) and Yeom Tae-gyun (left) returned to Ciipher.
    - Yeom Tae-gyun left the group on August 9, 2023.
  - Lee Hoe-taek (13th) returned to Pentagon. He made his solo debut on January 16, 2024, with his first mini album, Whu Is Me : Complex.
  - Seo Won (25th), Jang Ji-ho (63rd), and Winnie (80th) returned to Nine.i.
    - Winnie left the group on January 28, 2024, and signed with Thai Entertainment Company APLAN in March 2024.
    - Seo Won left the group on June 13, 2025. He joined PA Entertainment in January 2026.
  - Ma Jingxiang (30th) returned to Midsummer Cubs. He later announced in a hand-written letter in February 2024 that he was no longer pursuing a career of being an idol. However, he joined the survival show Project 7 where he ranked 1st and made his debut in the final group Close Your Eyes.
  - Lee Dong-yeol (44th) and Lee Hwan-hee (left) returned to Up10tion.
  - Xuan Hao (54th) returned to DREAM4.
  - Kei (87th) returned to EDAMAME BEANS.
    - The group disbanded on August 13, 2023.
  - Feng Junlan (93rd) returned to ECAT.
  - Jung Hwan-rok (left) returned to withus.
- Some contestants left their companies or joined new ones:
  - Jay (10th) signed an exclusive contract with FM Entertainment.
  - Cha Woong-ki (20th), Haruto (22nd), Anthonny (32nd), Oh Sungmin (35th), Min (59th) and Park Min-seok (61st) left Wake One Entertainment.
    - Haruto and Anthonny joined YY Entertainment.
    - Park Minseok joined Beat Interactive.
    - Min joined Thai Entertainment company APLAN in March 2024.
  - Lee Seunghwan (24th) joined Inyeon Entertainment and changed his stage name to ONLEE.
  - Park Ji-hoo (33rd) and Han Seo-bin (60th) left H1ghr Music.
    - Park Ji-hoo joined Wake One Entertainment.
  - Lee Ye-dam (36th) left LM Entertainment.
  - Brian (37th) left Yuehua Entertainment and joined FNC Entertainment.
  - Jung Min-gyu (38th) left CABIN74 and signed with Fantagio.
  - Lim Jun-seo (40th) and Lee Da-eul (47th) left 143 Entertainment.
  - Dang Hong Hai (42nd) left Fantagio and joined Dongyo Entertainment.
  - Cong (43rd) joined Mustation Entertainment and changed his stage name to "CongB".
  - Lee Dong-yeol (44th) and Lee Hwan-hee (left) left TOP Media.
    - Both Lee Dong-yeol and Lee Hwan-hee joined PA Entertainment.
  - Krystian (45th) joined Tencent Music Entertainment.
  - Park Hyunbeen (48th) left Jellyfish Ent. He later joined Mystic Story.
  - Wang Yanhong (77th) left ASE Family.
  - Kei (87th) left Stardust Promotion. He later joined BMSG.
  - Itsuki (88th) left MLD Entertainment.
  - Yuto (90th) joined YY Entertainment.
  - Yoo Seung-eon (16th) returned to YH Entertainment.
- Some contestants will debut or debuted in new boy groups or released music as solo artists:
  - Jay (10th) debuted as a soloist on October 17, 2023, with the mini album Late Night.
  - Jay (10th), Yoon Jong-woo (18th), Oh Sung-min (35th), Lee Ye-dam (36th) and Yeom Tae-gyun (left) became members of new project group One Pact under Armada Entertainment and debuted November 30, 2023.
  - Park Hanbin (11th), Keita (12th), Lee Jeong-hyeon (15th), Yoo Seung-eon (16th), Mun Jung-hyun (29th), Park Ji-hoo (33rd) and Ji Yun-seo (41st) were due to debut in Jellyfish's boy group, Blit in 2023. On August 9, 2023, Jellyfish Entertainment renamed the group to Evnne. They debuted with the EP 'Target: Me' with the title track 'Trouble' on September 19, 2023.On December 8, Jellyfish announced that members Yoo Seung-eon (16th) and Ji Yun-seo (41st) will leave the group after the expiry of their contracts with the company on December 31.
  - Kum Jun-hyeon (14th), Choi Woo-jin (50th), Kim Min-seoung (58th) and Hong Keon-hee (84th) pre-debuted in Redstart ENM's boy group Tiot on August 28, 2023. The group released a pre-debut single titled "Undefeated", a remake of the same song by Click-B, on August 23, 2023. They are set to officially debut on April 22, 2024.
  - Na Kamden (17th), Brian (37th) and Choi Jiho (55th) debuted in FNC Entertainment's new 7-member boy group, Ampers&One on November 15, 2023, with their first single album Ampersand One.
  - Wang Zihao (19th) debuted as a solo artist on August 18, 2023, under the stage name "Le'v" with the EP and single titled "A.I.BAE".
  - Hiroto (21st) was slated to debut in RBW's new boy group NXD, they were set to debut in November 2023, though the debut was postponed. On October 31, 2024, RBW announced that Hiroto had departed from NXD.
  - Haruto (22nd), Takuto (27th), Anthonny (32nd) and Yuto (90th) debuted in YY's new boy group, TOZ, with their first mini album "Flare" on September 27, 2023.
  - Chen Kuanjui (23rd), Wumuti (34th) and Haru (66th) along with new teammate Hyun debuted as the kpop group Xlov on January 7, 2025, with their first single album I'mma Be.
  - Lee Seunghwan (24th) as ONLEE debuted on the September 9, 2023, with the song "Be With You".
  - Zhang Shuaibo (28th) released a single titled "With You" on May 16, 2023.
  - Dang Hong Hai (42nd) became a member of NEWKIES, a trainee group within Dongyo Entertainment, and is expected to make his debut.
  - Cong (43rd) as CongB released his pre-debut song "Em đợi anh lâu chưa ?" on December 16, 2023. He will reportedly make his solo debut in December 2025 with his first EP "CongBDay"
  - Lee Dongyeol (44th) and Lee Hwan-hee (left the show for health reasons) will make their solo debuts before the end of 2023.
  - Park Hyunbeen (48th) will make his debut in Mystic Story's new group ARrC under the new stage name Hyunmin.
  - Jeong I-chan (49th), who already debuted as a soloist prior to the airing of the show, released his second solo single album titled Strange on July 12, 2023.
  - Park Minseok (62nd) joined Beat Interactive's trainee boy group temporarily named New Beat, and later renamed to HinLove.
  - Hojin (65th and Riku (91st) will debut sometime in 2024 in Japanese-Korean boy group KJRGL, formerly known as the pre-debut trainee group House Of Trainees (HOT).
  - Qiu Shengyang (81st) debuted in Tpop's new boy group, Opensi on June 26, 2023, with the single "A Little Love".
  - Chen Yugeng (82nd) will debut as a soloist on August 15, 2023, with the EP List.
- Some contestants left the idol industry or further expanded their careers in the acting/entertainment industry:
  - Lee Hoe-taek (13th) joined the mentor cast for the Chinese-Korean survival show Starlight Boys in which fellow contestants Cong (43rd; as CongB) and Lee Daeul (47th) competed in.
  - Cha Woong-ki (20th) since leaving WakeOne and becoming an independent idol has been confirmed to appear in Hwacha's novel drama adaptation Love For Loves Sake, filming commenced in Autumn of 2023 and aired Jan 24, 2024 – Feb 1, 2024. He is also confirmed to appear as an actor in soloist iaaa's MV for her song "Our Season", due to be released on April 7, 2024.
  - Jung Min-gyu (38th) left the idol industry to continue his career as an actor. He will participate as an actor in the BL reality show Boy's Voice.
  - Chen Jianyu (39th) will continue his acting career by starring as Prince Shen Lan in C-Drama 君面似桃花.
  - Bak Do-ha (46th) was officially announced as an actor under Cube Entertainment with an Actor Profile added to their website on September 26, 2023.
  - Min (59th) and Winnie (80th) since joining APLAN Entertainment have been confirmed to guest star in Thai BL drama "Battle of the Writers". They later started training to become two members of Aplan's first as-yet unnamed Tpop group.
  - Jeon Ho-young (71st) left the idol industry to continue his career as an actor under the stage name Nam Dan-woo under Oui Entertainment.
- Some contestants participated in other survival shows:
  - Jay Chang (10th), Wumuti (34th) and Lee Hwanhee (left) participated in Korean vocal survival show Build Up: Vocal Boy Group Survival. Hwanhee was later eliminated, whilst Wumuti and Jay Chang made it to the final where they joined teams Waterfire and HunMinJayBit respectively. Jay went on to win the show in team HunMinJayBit alongside teammates Minseo, Mont's Bitsaeon, and CIX' Seunghun, and the team will rebrand and debut as B.D.U (Boys Define Universe), a 2-year project group. Due to high interest post-show, it was announced that team Waterfire would also debut as a project group with Wumuti joining teammates Choi Suhwan, Kang Hayoon, and UP10TION's Sunyoul for a May 2024 debut
  - Cha Woong-ki (20th) appeared on the June 25, 2023, broadcast of King of Mask Singer.
  - Cha Woong-ki (20th) and Zhang Shuaibo (28th) participated in the Korean survival show Universe League. Both went on to debut in the winning group AHOF under F&F Entertainment, after ranking in 8th and 3rd place, respectively.
  - Seo Won (25th), Cai Jinxin (31st), Dang Honghai (42nd), Krystian (45th), and Xuan Hao (54th) participated in Korean survival show Boys II Planet. Cai Jinxin, Krystian, and Xuan Hao were all eliminated in the second episode after ranking 81st, 86th, and 82nd respectively, and Seo Won and Dang Honghai were both eliminated in the eighth episode after ranking 39th and 46th respectively.
    - Dang Honghai (42nd) participated in the Boys II Planet spin-off show Planet C: Home Race. He was eliminated in the final episode, after ranking 9th.
  - Ollie (26th), Chen Liang (70th) (under the stage name Felix), Wang Yanhong (77th) (under the stage name Dale) and Lin Shiyuan (92nd) (under the stage name One) appeared as contestants on Youku & TVB's Hong Kong survival show Asia Super Young.. Ollie and Chen Liang went onto debut in the winning group Loong9 under Yuehua Entertainment, in 1st and 9th place, respectively.
  - Ma Jingxiang (30th), Jang Yeojun (62nd), and Jung Seyun (74th) participated on Korean survival show Project 7. Ma Jingxiang and Jang Yeojun went onto debut in the winning group Close Your Eyes under Uncore, in 1st and 6th place, respectively.
  - Cai Jinxin (31st) participated in Tencent Video and Wajijwa Entertainment's show The Next Stage 2023. He was eliminated on episode 3.
  - Lee Yedam (36th) participated in dance survival show Show King Night. He was later eliminated.
  - Cong (43rd; as CongB) and Lee Daeul (47th) participated in the Chinese-Korean survival show Starlight Boys in which fellow contestant Lee Hoe-taek (13th) joined the mentor cast. Cong was eliminated in the final round, while Lee Daeul placed 9th and joined the final debut group "Polarix".
  - Cong (as CongB) participated in the Vietnamese survival show Anh Trai "Say Hi" 2025. He was eliminated in the final round but received the Best Performer Award.
  - Yang Jun (73rd) participated in Tencent Video and Wajijwa Entertainment's show My Youth. He was eliminated on episode 8.
  - Dong Dong (79th) and Feng Junlan (93rd; as Ricky) participated in Chuang Asia: Season 2. Feng Junlan was eliminated in the sixth episode after ranking 49th, and Dong Dong was eliminated in the final episode after ranking 11th.
  - Osuke (83rd) will participate in the Japanese survival show Produce 101 Japan Shinsekai.
  - Han Yuseop (85th) participated in the Korean survival show Make Mate 1, with fellow contestant Lee Hoe-taek (13th) being part of the special judge cast. Han Yuseop ended the show in 7th place and debuted in the group Nouera on February 26, 2025.
  - Hyo (86th) participated in SBS's Korean survival show B:My Boys, with fellow contestant Lee Hoe-taek (13th) being part of the master cast. Hyo is set to debut as a member the winning group YUHZ under Pinnacle Entertainment, after ranking 1st place on the show.
