= 2026 SPOTV K-pop Awards =

2026 South Korean award ceremony

- Official poster
- Date: September 6, 2026
- Location: KINTEX, Goyang
- Country: South Korea
- Presented by: SPOTV and BIGC
- Hosted by: Jang Sung-kyu; Tsuki; Han Yu-jin
- Website: www.bigc.im/spotv_awards

Television/radio coverage
- Network: SPOTV Plus; SPOTV2; Daum

The 2026 SPOTV K-pop Awards, also known as 2026 SKA, was an award ceremony organized by SPOTV and BIGC, held at KINTEX in Goyang on September 6, 2026. It recognized the best artists and recordings, based mainly on Circle Music Chart data from 2026, votes from K-pop fans worldwide, and judges' scores. The ceremony was hosted by Jang Sung-kyu, Tsuki and Han Yu-jin.

It was broadcast live on SPOTV Plus, SPOTV2 and Daum in South Korea.

In August 2026, it was announced that the Circle Chart Music Awards rebranded as SPOTV K-pop Awards.

== Winners and nominees ==
Winners and nominees are listed in alphabetical order.

=== Main awards ===
Main Awards
Best Album of the Year	Best Artist of the Year
BTS – Arirang	AKMU
Best Song of the Year	Artist of the Year (Bonsang Awards)
KiiiKiii – "404 (New Era)"	AKMU; Alpha Drive One; And2ble; BTS; NCT Wish; KiiiKiii; Kiss of Life
Rookie of the Year
Alpha Drive One; And2ble

=== Other awards ===
Other Categories	Winner
Casanello Best Performer	Billlie
Daum Best Female Solo Artist	Yena
Daum Best Male Solo Artist	D.O.
Best Creative Producer	Jung Hae-chang (YH Entertainment)
SPOTV Ambassador	Rescene
SPOTV Ground Performance	KickFlip
Best Female Group	Kiss of Life
Best Male Group	KickFlip
Best Genre – Trot Male Artist	Seongri
Best Genre – Trot Female Artist	Jeon Yu-jin
Best Genre – Rock/Indie Artist	Hanroro
Global Connect	Rescene, Modyssey, 82Major
Global New Wave	Cosmosy, Pow, Xikers
Next Generation	Close Your Eyes, Idid

=== Popularity awards ===
Categories	Winner
BIGC X coogoong Global Fan Choice Best Spotlight	Ricky
BIGC X coogoong Global Fan Choice OST	Zhang Hao – "Refresh!" (To the Moon)
BIGC X coogoong Global Fan Choice Iconic	Zhang Hao
BIGC X coogoong Global Fan Choice Band	Day6
BIGC X coogoong Global Fan Choice Trot	Lee Chan-won
BIGC X coogoong Global Fan Choice K-Pop	Nana (Unis)
