= I Wanna Know (Zhang Hao song) =

Single by Zhang Hao

from the album Exchange 3 OST Part 4
- Language: Korean; English
- Released: January 19, 2024
- Studio: CSMUSIC& Studios (Seoul); GCA Studios (Seoul)
- Genre: Pop; Dance
- Length: 2:44
- Label: CJ ENM
- Composers: Star Wars (Galactika); And1 (Galactika); Athena (Galactika)
- Lyricists: friday. (Galactika); Ogi (Galactika)
- Producers: Kim Jeong-ha; Yoon Min-ah; Yang Yoon-seung

Zhang Hao singles chronology
"I Wanna Know" (2024)	"Refresh!" (2025)

Music video
- "I Wanna Know" on YouTube

"I Wanna Know" is a song recorded by Chinese singer Zhang Hao, serving as an original soundtrack (OST) for the 2023 South Korean television program Exchange 3. The song was released digitally through Stone Music Entertainment on January 19, 2024, as Zhang Hao's first solo original soundtrack.

== Background, release and promotion ==
"I Wanna Know" was first featured as a snippet at the beginning of Exchange 3's episode three, aired on January 5, 2024. It was next featured in the following week's episode during the dating show participants' first dates. The track was later confirmed to release on January 19 to digital music and streaming platforms, alongside the accompanying music video which includes scenes from the series and shots of Zhang Hao performing the song in a recording studio. "I Wanna Know" was performed exclusively on Mnet's M Countdown on February 1.

== Lyrics and composition ==
"I Wanna Know" is a dance song written by Friday and Ogi, and composed by Star Wars, And1, and Athena of music production group Galactika. The song expresses the excitement of wanting to know every little thing about the other person with acoustic guitar and piano lines. The song is composed in the key F Major, and is 180 beats per minute with a running time of 2 minutes and 44 seconds.

== Commercial performance ==
Upon its release, "I Wanna Know" entered South Korea's Circle Digital Chart at number 80 in the chart issue dated January 14 to 20, 2024. It also topped the iTunes charts of 25 countries/regions, including Spain and Indonesia, which made the song debut at number 1 on iTunes' Worldwide Song Chart. On Circle's component charts, the song landed at number 1 on the Download Chart, and number 160 on the BGM Chart. "I Wanna Know" also peaked at number 9 on Billboard's World Digital Song Sales, and number 27 on Billboard Japan's Download Song Chart. The song was noted as the longest charting Kpop song on the Tencent Music Chart in 2024, having charted for 37 weeks and tied with "Fate" by I-dle.

== Awards and nominations ==
Name of the award ceremony, year presented, category, nominee of the award, and the result of the nomination
Award ceremony	Year	Category	Result	Ref.
Blue Dragon Series Awards	2024	OST Popularity Award	Won	
Newsis K-Expo Cultural Awards	2025	Global Netizen Award – OST	Won	

== Track listing ==
Digital download and streaming
No.	Title	Length
1.	"I Wanna Know"	2:44
2.	"I Wanna Know" (Instrumental ver.)	2:44
Total length:		5:28

== Credits and personnel ==
Credits adapted from YouTube.

Personnel

- Zhang Hao – vocals
- friday. (Galactika) – lyricist
- Ogi (Galactika) – lyricist
- Star Wars (Galactika) – composer
- And1 (Galactika) – composer, arranger, piano
- Athena (Galactika) – composer, arranger, piano
- Isntoff – guitar
- On Seong-yoon – recorder
- Uhm Se-hyeon – recorder
- Gu Jeong-phil – mixer
- Kwon Nam-oo – masterer
- Kim Jeong-ha – producer
- Yoon Min-ah – producer
- Yang Yoon-seung- producer

Recording and management

- Recorded at CSMUSIC& Studios and GCA Studios
- Mixed at KLANG studio
- Mastered at 821 Sound Mastering
- Produced at CJ ENM

== Charts ==
=== Weekly charts ===
Weekly chart performance for "I Wanna Know"
Chart (2024)	Peak position
South Korea Digital Chart (Circle Chart)	80
South Korea Download Chart (Circle Chart)	1
US World Digital Song Sales (Billboard)	9
Japan Download Songs (Billboard Japan)	27
China Korean Songs Chart (Tencent Music)	10

=== Monthly charts ===
Monthly chart performance for "I Wanna Know"
Chart (2024)	Peak position
South Korea Download Chart (Circle Chart)	6

=== Yearly charts ===
Yearly chart performance for "I Wanna Know"
Chart	Peak position
South Korea Download Chart (Circle Chart)	176

== Release history ==
Release dates and formats for "I Wanna Know"
Region	Date	Format	Label	Ref.
Various	January 19, 2024	Digital download; streaming	Stone	
