= SPOTV K-pop Awards =

South Korean music awards ceremony

- Official logo
- Awarded for: Commercial performance of songs and albums
- Country: South Korea
- Presented by: Korea Music Content Association (2012–24); SPOTV (2026-present); BIGC (2026-present)
- Formerly called: Gaon Chart K-pop Awards (2012–16); Gaon Chart Music Awards (2017–21); Circle Chart Music Awards (2022–24)
- First award: February 22, 2012; 14 years ago
- Website: www.circlemusicawards.co.kr

The SPOTV K-pop Awards, formerly known as the Circle Chart Music Awards or Gaon Chart Music Awards, is a music awards ceremony that is presented annually in South Korea by the Korea Music Content Association primarily based on the commercial performance of the songs and albums based on the national music record chart Circle Chart.

Since 2017, the awarding ceremony has been broadcast live worldwide via Mnet and V Live. In addition to the Gaon Chart being rebranded to the Circle Chart on July 7, 2022, it was announced the Gaon Chart Music Awards would be renamed to the Circle Chart Music Awards. Since 2026, it was rebranded to the SPOTV K-pop Awards.

== Host venues ==
Circle Chart Music Awards logo

=== As Gaon Chart K-pop Awards ===
Year	Date	Host city	Venue	Host
2011	February 22, 2012	Seoul	Blue Square Samsung Card Hall	Taeyeon and Joo Young-hoon
2012	February 13, 2013	Seoul	Olympic Hall	Gain and Joo Young-hoon
2013	February 12, 2014	Seoul	Olympic Gymnastics Arena	Yuri and Oh Sang-jin
2014	January 28, 2015	Seoul	Olympic Gymnastics Arena	Leeteuk and Hyeri
2015	February 17, 2016	Seoul	Olympic Hall	Leeteuk and Yura

=== As Gaon Chart Music Awards ===
Year	Date	Host city	Venue	Host	Ref.
2016	February 22, 2017	Seoul	Jamsil Arena	Leeteuk and Solar	
2017	February 14, 2018	Seoul	Jamsil Arena	Leeteuk and Dahyun	
2018	January 23, 2019	Seoul	Jamsil Arena	Kim Jong-kook and Nancy	
2019	January 8, 2020	Seoul	Jamsil Arena	Leeteuk and Lia	
2020	January 13, 2021	Seoul	CJ E&M Center	Leeteuk, Lia, Jaejae and Joo Young-hoon	
2021	January 27, 2022	Seoul	Jamsil Arena	Jaejae, Doyoung and Sieun	

=== As Circle Chart Music Awards ===
Year	Date	Host city	Venue	Host	Ref.
2022	February 18, 2023	Seoul	KSPO Dome	Doyoung and Miyeon	
2023	January 10, 2024	Busan	Busan Exhibition and Convention Center	Leeteuk, Sieun and Seok Matthew	

=== As SPOTV K-pop Awards ===
Year	Date	Host city	Venue	Host	Ref.
2026	September 6, 2026	Goyang	Korea International Exhibition Center	Jang Sung-kyu, Tsuki, and Han Yu-jin	

== Awards ==
=== Artist of the Year – Physical ===
==== Current format ====
List of winners (2023–present)
Edition	Year	Winners					Ref.
13th	2023	Jungkook	NCT Dream	Seventeen	Stray Kids	TXT	

==== Previous format ====
List of winners (2011–2022)
Edition	Year	Winners				Ref.
Edition	Year	1st Quarter	2nd Quarter	3rd Quarter	4th Quarter	Ref.
1st	2011	TVXQ	Beast	Super Junior	Girls' Generation	
2nd	2012	BigBang	Girls' Generation-TTS	Super Junior	TVXQ	
3rd	2013	Girls' Generation	Cho Yong-pil	Exo		
4th	2014	TVXQ	Exo	Super Junior		
5th	2015	Exo		Super Junior	Exo	
6th	2016	Got7	Exo		BTS	
7th	2017	BTS	Seventeen	BTS	Wanna One	
8th	2018	Wanna One	BTS		Exo	
9th	2019	Seventeen	BTS	Seventeen	Exo	
10th	2020	BTS	Baekhyun	Seventeen	BTS	
11th	2021	Iz*One	NCT Dream	BTS	NCT 127	
12th	2022	NCT	Seventeen	BTS	Stray Kids	

=== Artist of the Year – Digital Music ===
==== Current format ====
List of winners (2023–present)
Edition	Year	Winners			Ref.
Edition	Year	Global Streaming	Digital	Streaming Unique Listeners	Ref.
13th	2023	(G)I-dle			
13th	2023	Ive			
13th	2023	NewJeans			
13th	2023	Jungkook		Aespa	
13th	2023	Jisoo	Le Sserafim		

==== Previous format ====
List of winners (2019–2022)
Edition	Year	Winners												Ref.
Edition	Year	December	January	February	March	April	May	June	July	August	September	October	November	Ref.
9th	2019	Ben	MC the Max	Hwasa	Taeyeon	Bolbbalgan4	Davichi	Jang Hye-jin & Yoon Min-soo	Ben	Sunmi	AKMU	MC Mong	IU	
10th	2020	Red Velvet	Zico	BTS	MC the Max	Oh My Girl	IU	Blackpink	Zico	BTS	Chungha & Christopher	Blackpink	BTS	
11th	2021	Taeyeon	IU	Shinee	IU	Kang Daniel	BTS	Brave Girls	BTS	Red Velvet	Coldplay & BTS	IU	Twice	
12th	2022	Ive	Kep1er	Taeyeon	(G)I-dle	Ive	Le Sserafim	BTS	Aespa	Blackpink		Le Sserafim	Itzy	

List of winners (2011–2018)
Edition	Year	Winners												Ref.
Edition	Year	January	February	March	April	May	June	July	August	September	October	November	December	Ref.
1st	2011	Secret	IU	K.will	BigBang	2NE1	Secret	T-ara	Leessang	Davichi	Lee Seung-gi	Wonder Girls	IU	
2nd	2012	T-ara	BigBang		Busker Busker	Girls' Generation-TTS	Wonder Girls	2NE1	Psy	Jung Eun-ji & Seo In-guk	Gain	Lee Hi	Lee Seung-gi	
3rd	2013	Girls' Generation	Sistar19	Davichi	Psy	4Minute	Sistar	Dynamic Duo	San E	Soyou & Mad Clown	IU	Miss A	Seo In-guk & Zia	
4th	2014	Girl's Day	Soyou & Junggigo	2NE1	AKMU	g.o.d	Taeyang	San E & Raina	Park Bo-ram	Sistar	Kim Dong-ryool	MC Mong	Apink	
5th	2015	Mad Clown	Naul	MC Mong	Miss A	BigBang				iKon	Taeyeon	Zico	Psy	
6th	2016	GFriend	Mamamoo	Jang Beom-june	Twice	Urban Zakapa	Sistar	Wonder Girls	Blackpink	Im Chang-jung	Twice	Blackpink	BigBang	
7th	2017	AKMU	Twice	IU		Psy	G-Dragon	Exo	Sunmi	Sechs Kies	Epik High	Wanna One	Twice	
8th	2018	iKon	Roy Kim	BigBang	Twice	Bolbbalgan4	Blackpink	Twice	Red Velvet	Im Chang-jung	IU	Jennie	Lovelyz	

=== New Artist of the Year ===
==== Current format ====
List of winners (2023–present)
Edition	Year	Winners			Ref.
Edition	Year	Global Streaming	Streaming Unique Listeners	Album	Ref.
13th	2023	Babymonster	Riize	Zerobaseone	

==== Previous format ====
List of winners (2011–2022)
Edition	Year	Winners				Ref.
Edition	Year	Male Group	Female Group	Male Solo	Female Solo	Ref.
1st	2011	B1A4	Apink	Huh Gak	Kim Bo kyung	
2nd	2012	B.A.P	Hello Venus	John Park	Ailee	
3rd	2013	BTS	Ladies' Code	Jung Joon-young	Lim Kim	
4th	2014	Winner	Mamamoo	—	—	
5th	2015	iKon	GFriend	—	—	
6th	2016	NCT 127	Blackpink	—	—	
7th	2017	Wanna One	Weki Meki	Woo Won-jae	—	
8th	2018	Stray Kids	(G)I-dle & Iz*One	Haon	—	
9th	2019	TXT	Itzy	—	—	
10th	2020	Enhypen	Aespa	—	—	
11th	2021	—	—	Lee Mu-jin & Lee Chan-won	—	
12th	2022	Tempest	NewJeans & Ive	—	—	

=== Discovery of the Year ===
Edition	Year	Winners (Category)							Ref.
Edition	Year	Hip-Hop	Indie	R&B	Ballad	Trot	Group	J-Pop	Ref.
1st	2011	—	The Koxx	Noel	—	—	Girl's Day	—	
2nd	2012	Double K	3rd Line Butterfly	—	—	Apink	—	—	
3rd	2013	—	Rose Motel	—	—	—	—	—	
4th	2014	Epik High	—	Red Velvet	—	—	Lovelyz	—	
5th	2015	Song Min-ho	Hyukoh	Zion.T	—	Lee Ae Ran	—	—	
6th	2016	BewhY	Bolbbalgan4	Dean	Han Dong-geun	—	—	—	
7th	2017	Changmo	MeloMance	Heize	Hwang Chi-yeul	—	—	—	
8th	2018	—	—	Punch	Ben	—	Stray Kids	—	
9th	2019	—	—	—	Kassy	—	N.Flying	—	
10th	2020	—	—	—	—	Young Tak	—	—	
11th	2021	Homies	—	—	—	—	STAYC	—	
12th	2022	Be'O	—	—	—	—	—	—	
13th	2023	—	—	—	Parc Jae-jung	Lee Chan-won	—	imase	

=== Music Steady Seller of the Year ===
Edition	Year	Winner	Song	Ref.
3rd	2013	Girl's Day	"Expectation"	
4th	2014	Soyou & Junggigo	"Some"	
5th	2015	Naul	"You in The Same Time"	
6th	2016	MC the Max	"No Matter Where"	
7th	2017	IU	"Through the Night"	
8th	2018	iKon	"Love Scenario"	
9th	2019	Paul Kim	"Me After You"	
10th	2020	IU	"Blueming"	
11th	2021	BTS	"Dynamite"	
12th	2022	Lim Young-woong	"Love Always Runs Away"	
13th	2023	NewJeans	"Hype Boy"	

=== Retail Album of the Year ===
Edition	Year	Winner	Album	Ref.
9th	2019	BTS	Map of the Soul: Persona	
10th	2020	BTS	Map of the Soul: 7	
11th	2021	BTS	Butter	
12th	2022	BTS	Proof	
13th	2023	Seventeen	FML	

=== Top Kit Seller of the Year ===
Edition	Year	Winner	Album	Ref.
9th	2019	Exo	Obsession	
10th	2020	NCT	NCT 2020 Resonance Pt. 1	
11th	2021	NCT Dream	Hot Sauce	
12th	2022	NCT	Universe	
13th	2023	Seventeen	—N/a	

=== Popular Singer of the Year ===
Edition	Year	Winner	Song	Ref.
3rd	2013	Roy Kim & Jung Joon-young	"Becoming Dust"	
4th	2014	Im Chang-jung	"A Glass of Soju"	
5th	2015	So Chan Whee	"Tears"	
6th	2016	MC the Max	"No Matter Where"	
7th	2017	Yoon Jong-shin	"Like It"	
8th	2018	Jang Deok Cheol	"Good Old Days"	
9th	2019	Lim Jae-hyun	"If There Was Practice in Love"	
10th	2020	Hwang in-wook	"Phocha"	
11th	2021	Standing Egg	"Old Song"	

=== Overseas Music Awards ===
Edition	Year	Winner	Song	Ref.
1st	2011	Maroon 5 feat. Christina Aguilera	"Moves like Jagger"	
2nd	2012	Maroon 5	"Payphone"	
3rd	2013	DJ Gollum	"The Bad Touch"	
4th	2014	Maroon 5	"Maps"	
5th	2015	Adele	"Hello"	
6th	2016	Maroon 5	"Don't Wanna Know"	
7th	2017	Ed Sheeran	"Shape of You"	
8th	2018	Camila Cabello	"Havana"	
9th	2019	Anne-Marie	"2002"	
11th	2021	Justin Bieber feat. Daniel Caesar & Giveon	"Peaches"	
12th	2022	The Kid Laroi & Justin Bieber	"Stay"	
13th	2023	Charlie Puth	"Dangerously"	

=== Composer/Lyricist of the Year ===
Edition	Year	Winners		Ref.
Edition	Year	Composer	Lyricist	Ref.
1st	2011	Yoon Sang	Kim Eana	
2nd	2012	Teddy	Kim Eana	
3rd	2013	Duble Sidekick	Kim Eana	
4th	2014	Min Yeon-jae	Kim Do-hoon	
5th	2015	Black Eyed Pilseung	Kim Eana	
6th	2016	Black Eyed Pilseung	Jo Yoon-kyung	
7th	2017	Pdogg	IU	
8th	2018	Teddy	Seo Ji-eum	
9th	2019	Black Eyed Pilseung	Min Yeon-jae	
10th	2020	Pop Time	IU	
11th	2021	Ryan S. Jhun	IU	
12th	2022	Ryan S. Jhun	Seo Ji-eum	
13th	2023	250	Gigi	

=== Performers of the Year ===
Edition	Year	Winners		Ref.
Edition	Year	Chorus	Musical Instrument	Ref.
1st	2011	Kim Hyun-a	Kang Soo-ho	
2nd	2012	Kim Hyo-soo	Shin Hyun-kwon	
3rd	2013	Gil Eun-kyung	Tommy Kim	
4th	2014	Kang Tae-woo	Jang-hyeok	
5th	2015	Lee Tae-yoon	Kang Sung-ho	
6th	2016	Kim Ryeong	Lee Seong-yeol & Choi Tae-wan	
7th	2017	Kang Tae-woo	Lee Seung-yeob	
8th	2018	Jun Jae Hee	Kim Mi-jung & Shin Sang-won	
9th	2019	Joo Chan Yang	Choi Hun	
10th	2020	KREEZE	Jung Jae-pil (Young)	
11th	2021	Kim Yeon Seo	Jung Jae-pil (Young)	
12th	2022	Bae Soo-jung	Choi In-sung	
13th	2023	Perrie	Hareem	

=== Style of the Year ===
Edition	Year	Winners		Ref.
Edition	Year	Choreographer	Stylist	Ref.
1st	2011	Prepix	Seo Soo-kyung	
2nd	2012	Lee Ju-sun	Song Jeong-ok	
3rd	2013	Yama & Hot Chicks	Jung Bo-yoon	
4th	2014	Choreography Team DQ	Park Seo-hyun, Choi Ji-hyang	
5th	2015	Yama & Hot Chicks	Ji Eunie	
6th	2016	Son Sung Deuk	Choi Hee Sun	
7th	2017	Lia Kim	Kim Ye-jin, Choi Kyung-won	
8th	2018	Son Sung Deuk	Ji Eunie	
9th	2019	Choi Ri An	Choi Hee Sun	
10th	2020	Son Sung Deuk	Kim Bal-ko & Park Min-hee	
11th	2021	Son Sung Deuk	Kim Wook	
12th	2022	Kim Eun-ju & Kim Young-hoo	Park Min-hee	
13th	2023	Park So-yeon	Kim Hye-soo	

=== Record Production of the Year ===
Edition	Year	Winner	Record	Ref.
7th	2017	Fave Entertainment	IU – "Through the Night"	
8th	2018	iKon	iKon – "Love Scenario"	
9th	2019	MNH Entertainment	Chungha – "Gotta Go"	
10th	2020	Ambition Musik	Changmo – "Meteor"	
11th	2021	EDAM Entertainment	IU – "Lilac"	
12th	2022	Cube Entertainment	(G)I-dle – I Never Die	

=== Social Hot Star of the Year ===
Edition	Year	Winner	Ref.
9th	2019	BTS	
10th	2020	Blackpink	
11th	2021	BTS	
12th	2022	BTS	
13th	2023	Blackpink	

=== Hot Performance of the Year ===
Edition	Year	Winner	Ref.
3rd	2013	Apink	
4th	2014	AOA	
5th	2015	Red Velvet	
5th	2015	VIXX	
6th	2016	Seventeen	
6th	2016	Infinite	
7th	2017	NU'EST W	
7th	2017	Got7	
8th	2018	Seventeen	
9th	2019	NCT Dream	
9th	2019	Chungha	
10th	2020	Iz*One	
10th	2020	Stray Kids	
11th	2021	Oh My Girl	
11th	2021	The Boyz	
12th	2022	Enhypen	

=== World K-pop Star ===
Edition	Year	Winner	Ref.
3rd	2013	2NE1	
4th	2014	Kara	
5th	2015	BTS	
6th	2016	Shinee	
7th	2017	Got7	
8th	2018	Seventeen	
9th	2019	Monsta X	
10th	2020	NCT	
11th	2021	Stray Kids	
12th	2022	Tomorrow X Together	
13th	2023	NCT Dream	

=== World K-Pop Rookie ===
Edition	Year	Winners		Ref.
3rd	2013	B.A.P	—	
4th	2014	BTS	—	
5th	2015	Seventeen	AOA	
7th	2017	—	Blackpink	
8th	2018	The Boyz	Momoland	
9th	2019	Stray Kids	(G)I-dle	
10th	2020	Ateez	Itzy	
11th	2021	Enhypen	Aespa	
12th	2022	STAYC		

=== International Rising Star of the Year ===
Edition	Year	Winner	Ref.
6th	2016	Charlie Puth	
7th	2017	Shawn Mendes	
9th	2019	Billie Eilish	
10th	2020	Tones and I	
11th	2021	Kid Laroi	
12th	2022	Gayle	

=== Mubeat Choice Award ===
Edition	Year	Winners		Ref.
Edition	Year	Male	Female	Ref.
10th	2020	Lim Young-woong	Blackpink	
11th	2021	BTS	Lisa	
12th	2022	Lim Young-woong	Blackpink	
13th	2023	Lim Young-woong	NiziU	

=== Mobile Vote Popularity Award ===
Edition	Year	Winner	Ref.
3rd	2013	Exo	
4th	2014	Exo	
5th	2015	Exo	
6th	2016	Sehun	
6th	2016	Exo	
7th	2017	Taeyeon	
7th	2017	Wanna One	
13th	2023	Zhang Hao	

== Discontinued awards ==
=== K-pop Contribution Award / Lifetime Achievement Award ===
Edition	Year	Winner	Ref.
1st	2011	Lee Soo-man	
2nd	2012	Hong Seung-sung	
3rd	2013	Cho Yong-pil	
4th	2014	Shin Hae-chul	
6th	2016	Sechs Kies	
7th	2017	Yoon Jong-shin	
8th	2018	BTS	
10th	2020	Lee Soo-man	

=== Special awards ===
Edition	Year	Awards	Winner	Ref.
1st	2011	Oricon Special Award	Girls' Generation	
2nd	2012	Hallyu Special Award	CNBLUE	
4th	2014	Weibo Kpop Star Award	Super Junior	
5th	2015	Weibo Kpop Star Award	Sehun	
5th	2015	Most Influential Group of Asia	Big Bang	
6th	2016	V Live Global Popularity Award	BTS	

=== Technical Award ===
Edition	Year	Winner	Ref.
1st	2011	Ko Seung-wook	

=== Hot Trend Award ===
Edition	Year	Winners		Ref.
2nd	2012	Apink	—	
3rd	2013	Crayon Pop	—	
4th	2014	Block B	EXID	
5th	2015	B.A.P	Baek A Yeon	

=== Producer of the Year ===
Edition	Year	Winner	Ref.
1st	2011	Kim Kwang-soo (Core Contents Media)	
2nd	2012	Yang Hyun-suk (YG Entertainment)	
3rd	2013	Yang Hyun-suk (YG Entertainment)	
4th	2014	Kim Shi-dae (Starship Entertainment)	
5th	2015	Yang Hyun-suk (YG Entertainment)	
6th	2016	Bang Si-hyuk (Big Hit Entertainment)	

=== New Media Platform ===
Edition	Year	Winners	Ref.
1st	2011	Daum	
1st	2011	YouTube	
3rd	2013	Bugs!	
4th	2014	Kakao Music	

=== Music Distribution ===
Edition	Year	Winners		Ref.
Edition	Year	Online	Offline	Ref.
2nd	2012	LOEN Entertainment	KMP Holdings	
3rd	2013	CJ E&M Music		
4th	2014	Universal Music		

=== Sound Engineer of the Year ===
Edition	Year	Winners	Ref.
1st	2011	Ko Seung-wook	
2nd	2012	Jeon Hoon	
3rd	2013	Jo Joon-sung	

== Most awards ==
The following artists (arranged in alphanumeric order) has received three or more awards.

=== Overall ===
Awards	Artist
32	BTS
16	Exo
16	IU
14	Blackpink
12	Seventeen

=== Artist of the Year – Physical ===
Awards	Artist
10	BTS
10	Exo
6	Seventeen
5	Super Junior
3	TVXQ

=== Artist of the Year – Digital ===
Awards	Artist
11	IU
9	BigBang
7	Blackpink
7	BTS
7	Twice
