= Zhang Hao (singer) =

Chinese singer (born 2000)

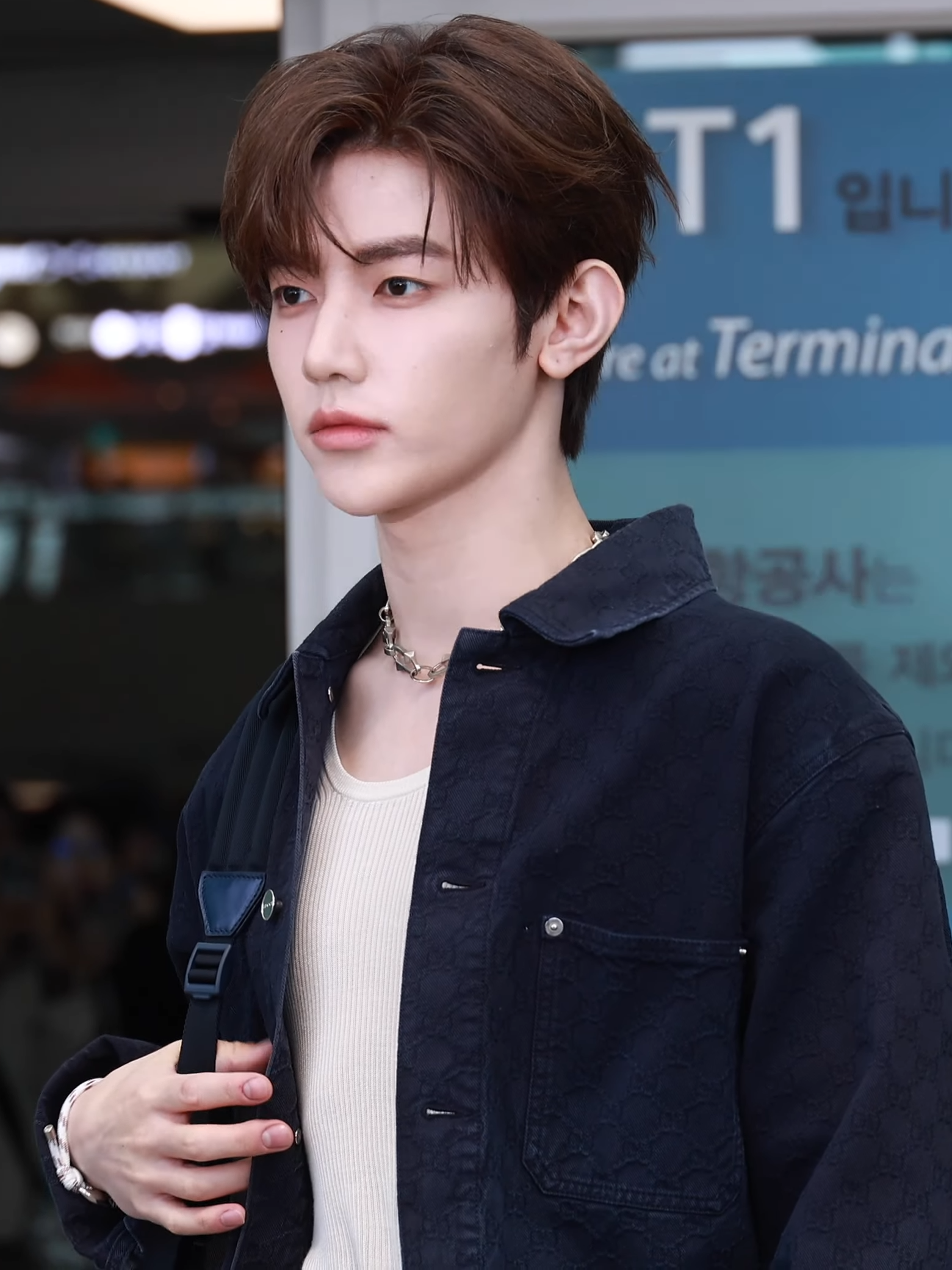
- Zhang in May 2025
- Born: July 25, 2000 (age 26); Nanping, Fujian, China
- Education: Fujian Normal University (BA)
- Occupation: Singer
- Years active: 2022–present
- Musical career
- Origin: South Korea
- Genre: K-pop
- Instruments: Vocals; violin
- Labels: YH; WakeOne (Note: As a member of Zerobaseone only.); Lapone
- Member of: And2ble
- Formerly of: Zerobaseone

Chinese name
- Chinese: 章昊
- Hanyu Pinyin: Zhāng Hào
- Hokkien POJ: Chông Hō

Zhang Hao (Chinese: 章昊; Korean: 장하오; born July 25, 2000) is a Chinese singer based in South Korea and signed under YH Entertainment. He was a member of the South Korean boy band Zerobaseone from its debut in July 2023 until his contract expired in March 2026. He re-debuted as a member of the boy group And2ble under YH Entertainment in 2026.

Zhang finished first in the reality competition show Boys Planet and is noted for being the first foreign contestant to place first in a South Korean idol survival show.

== Early life and education ==
Zhang Hao was born on July 25, 2000 in Nanping, Fujian, China. He originally followed the science academic track in school and consistently ranked among the top 10 in his middle and high school classes. After high school, he was admitted to the geology department at China University of Geosciences, a Project 211 university that, according to U.S. News & World Report, ranked first globally in geosciences. He later stated that his main interest in high school was music, which led him to retake the college entrance exam.

In January 2018, Zhang participated in the national college entrance exam for arts students and ranked first in his home province of Fujian. He then enrolled in musicology at Fujian Normal University and graduated in 2024. While in university, he obtained his teaching certificate to teach music to secondary school students. He played the violin, cello, viola, and piano and performed with the school orchestra.

In 2021, Zhang was recruited by YH Entertainment and trained for 15 months before joining the survival show Boys Planet.

== Career ==
=== 2022–2026: Boys Planet and debut with Zerobaseone ===
On December 29, 2022, Zhang was unveiled as a contestant on Mnet's reality competition show Boys Planet, and the center of G-Group in the performance of Boys Planet theme song "Here I Am" (난 빛나), which was broadcast on Mnet's M Countdown. The show aired from February 2 to April 20, 2023. Zhang was one of eight trainees representing YH Entertainment, and performed NCT 127's "Kick It" for his first star evaluation on the show.

On April 20, 2023, he placed 1st on Boys Planet with a total of 1,988,154 points, securing his debut as the center of South Korean boy band Zerobaseone (ZB1). The group officially debuted under WakeOne Entertainment with the EP Youth in the Shade on July 10, 2023. Zhang's solo track "Always" was also included in the EP, credited under the group's name. Later, he performed the song solo during the group's first world tour Timeless World and at the 2024 Music Bank Global Festival in Japan.

Beyond group activities, Zhang showcased his violin skills on multiple occasions. On October 21, 2023, Zhang performed g.o.d's "Road" on the violin in Knowing Bros episode 405. In the 87th episode of LeeMujin Service released on November 7, 2023, he performed BTS' "Dynamite" and Ive's "Either Way" on the violin in duet with host Lee Mujin on guitar. On November 28, 2023, he performed Boys Planet theme song "Here I Am" on the violin during the opening performance of the 2023 MAMA Awards.

On January 19, 2024, Zhang's first original soundtrack "I Wanna Know" was released for South Korean dating show Exchange 3. The song debuted atop the weekly Circle Download Chart in the chart issue dated January 14 to 20 and ranked at number 6 on the monthly Circle Download Chart issue dated January 2024. It also topped the iTunes charts of 25 countries and regions, including Spain and Indonesia, which made the song debut at number 1 on iTunes' Worldwide Song Chart. Zhang performed the song at M Countdown on February 1. Later, the song won the OST Popularity Awards at the 3rd Blue Dragon Series Awards and Zhang was noted as the first ever non-Korean artist to win at the Blue Dragon Series Awards. The song remained on the Tencent Music Chart for 37 weeks, becoming its longest-charting K-pop song of 2024 alongside "Fate" by I-dle. In August 2025, the song received the Global Netizen Award in the OST category at the 2025 Newsis K-Expo Cultural Awards.

Zhang also began gaining recognition in the fashion industry through magazines. On January 26, 2024, he made his solo cover artist debut on L'Officiel China's February 2024 Issue with a pictorial titled "Zhang Hao's Languid Winter". He then featured with group member Han Yu-jin on the April 2024 cover of Cosmopolitan Korea, and was recognized as the magazine's first foreign male cover model.

In June 2024, Zhang made his first appearance on Chinese television through the variety show Keep Running. In February 2025, Zhang joined JTBC's pilot program Knowing International High School as a main cast member starting from episode 3. Through his appearances on various entertainment programs, including SBS's What an Idol, Jang Do-yeon's Salon Drip, and MBC's Omniscient Interfering View, Zhang was described by Ilgan Sports as an emerging 'blue chip' in the entertainment industry. Zhang also served as an MC for the reality show I'm Sunny Thank You.

On May 29, 2025, Zhang was announced to make his acting debut in the MBC television series To the Moon. He appeared as Wei Lin, the Chinese boyfriend of Jo Aram's character. Zhang released an OST titled "Refresh!" for the drama on September 26, 2025. The song debuted at number 16 on Oricon's Daily Digital Singles Chart, and number 1 on the weekly Circle Download Chart in the chart issue dated September 21 to 27. The song also reached number 4 on US Billboard's World Digital Song Sales. In August, Zhang performed a cover of Trouble Maker's "Now" with I-dle member Yuqi at the 2025 KCON LA, a duet known for its bold and sultry choreography. Media coverage highlighted the performance for its high-quality execution and daring staging, as co-ed moments are relatively rare in modern K-pop. In September 2025, Zhang Hao made his Netflix debut as a recurring guest on TEO's travel reality show Getaway and Go with Jangdobari.

Zhang released an original soundtrack titled "For Whom Does Beauty Bloom" (红颜为谁开) as the ending theme of Bilibili animation series The Gate of Mystical Realm on November 26, 2025. He subsequently released "Coming for You" for the Chinese drama Shine on Me on December 25.

On January 12, 2026, YH Entertainment released a statement announcing that Zhang would depart from Zerobaseone to continue his activities under the label following the expiration of his contract with WakeOne Entertainment, alongside his labelmates and fellow Zerobaseone members, Ricky, Kim Gyu-vin, and Han Yu-jin. It was further stated that their contracts had been extended until March 15 to allow them to conclude their encore performances and final group activities. On March 15, the group held their final concert as a nine-piece ensemble, officially concluding Zhang's activities with Zerobaseone, along with Ricky, Kim Gyu-vin, and Han Yu-jin.

=== 2026–present: Re-debut with And2ble ===
On May 26, 2026, Zhang re-debuted as the leader of the boy group And2ble under YH Entertainment. A five-member group, And2ble includes three of Zhang's former bandmates—Ricky, Kim Gyu-vin, and Han Yu-jin—and the former Evnne member Yoo Seung-eon.

== Other ventures ==
Beyond his musical career with Zerobaseone, Zhang has expanded his influence through a range of ventures, including brand endorsements, fashion collaborations, and philanthropic initiatives.

=== Brand ambassadorships and endorsements ===
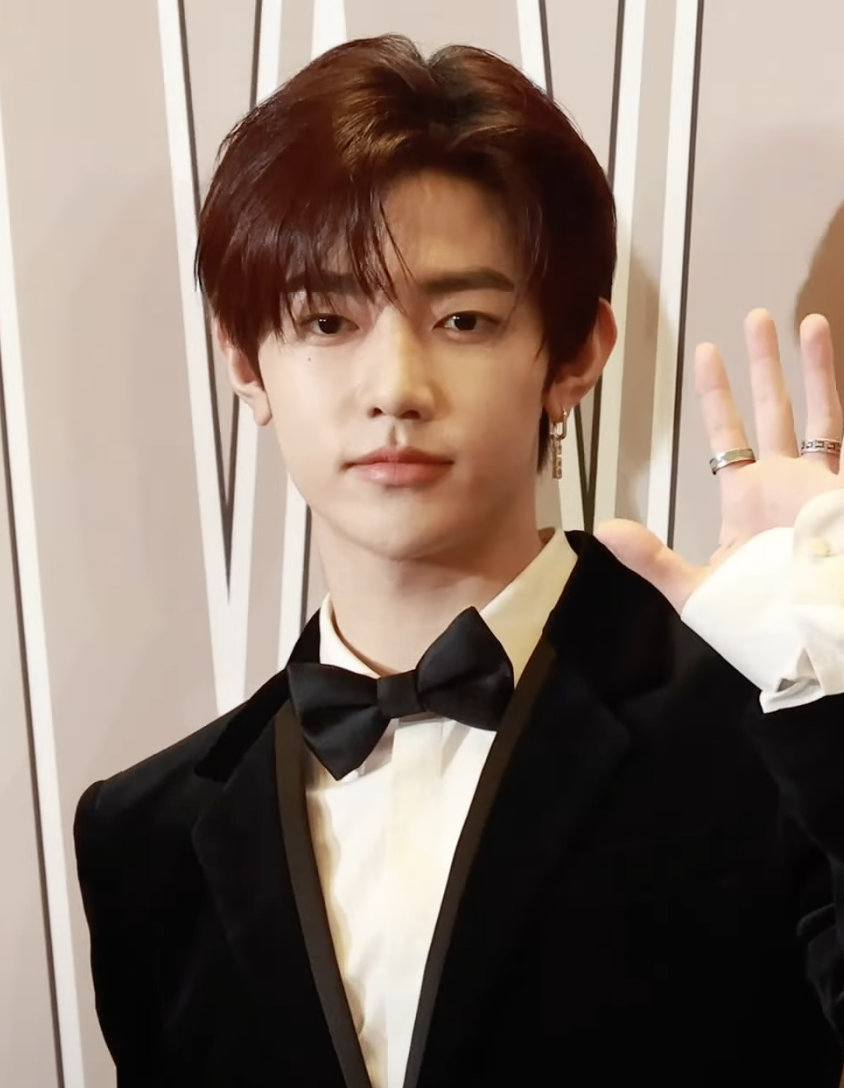
Zhang in October 2024 for W Korea's "Love Your W" event

In June 2024, Zhang was announced as the Chinese spokesperson of British hair care brand Tangle Teezer. It was reported that he plans to sequentially introduce various contents with the brand in the China region. In July, Zhang became the youth spokesperson of Thai cosmetics brand Mistine. In October, he was introduced as the spokesperson of Chinese personal care brand Kustie, as well as the spokesperson of American skin care brand Olay for its skin and lotion products. In Zhang's second year of debut, various entertainment media reported that he has begun to solidify himself as a representative of K-pop in 2024 and as a 'blue chip in the advertising world' regardless of field.

In March 2025, Zhang was named the new brand ambassador for Fila Fusion. In the same month, he served as the face of Fila Fusion's collaborative collection with Italian motorcycle manufacturer Ducati. In May, Zhang became the base makeup spokesperson of 3CE by Stylenanda, a South Korean beauty brand owned by L'Oréal. In September, Zhang was announced as the new brand spokesperson of American body and skin care brand Vaseline. In January 2026, Chinese beauty brand Kans named Zhang as its spokesperson for the Asia-Pacific region.

==== Fashion ====
Zhang is a Friend of the House for Italian luxury fashion brand Gucci, and has attended several of the brand's events, including Gucci's Ancora Celebration in Shanghai, Gucci Cultural Month Exhibition in Seoul, and Gucci Cruise 2026 fashion show in Florence.

Zhang has also appeared on the covers of several fashion magazines, including Dazed Korea, L'Officiel China, Cosmopolitan Korea, Y Magazine Noblesse, Madame Figaro China, SuperElle China, V magazine China, and Elle Korea. He also featured in the "Book in Book" section of the July 2026 issue of Singles Korea.

==== List of endorsements ====
- 2024 – Gucci (friend of house)
- 2024 – Tangle Teezer (brand spokesperson)
- 2024 – Mistine (brand spokesperson)
- 2024 – Kustie (brand spokesperson)
- 2024 – Olay (brand spokesperson)
- 2025 – Fila Fusion (brand ambassador)
- 2025 – 3CE by Stylenanda (brand spokesperson)
- 2025 – Vaseline (brand spokesperson)
- 2026 – Kans (Asia-Pacific brand spokesperson)
- 2026 – INTO YOU (Asia-Pacific brand spokesperson)
- 2026 – Pantene (brand spokesperson)
- 2026 – AHC (Brand spokesperson)

=== Philanthropy ===
Zhang has been involved in various philanthropic initiatives, both individually and as a member of Zerobaseone. In 2023 and 2024, he participated in the "Love Your W" campaign, a charity event for breast cancer awareness and treatment funding held by W Korea. On November 28, 2025, the Fosun Foundation of China announced that Zhang had donated to aid the Hong Kong fire relief effort following the 2025 Tai Po apartment complex fire.

== Discography ==
=== Soundtrack appearances ===
List of soundtrack appearances, showing year released, selected chart positions, and name of the album
Title	Year	Peak chart positions				Album
Title	Year	KOR	JPN DL	US World	CHN	Album
"I Wanna Know"	2024	80	27	9	—	Exchange 3 OST Part 4
"Refresh!"	2025	71	28	4	—	To the Moon OST Part 3
"For Whom Does Beauty Bloom" (红颜为谁开)	2025	—	—	—	18	The Gate of Mystical Realm ED
"Coming for You"	2025	—	—	—	14	Shine on Me OST
"同往"	2026	—	—	—	9	Where the Mask Ends OST
"—" denotes a recording that did not chart or was not released in that territory.

=== Other charted songs ===
List of other charted songs, showing year released, selected chart positions, and name of the album
Title	Year	Peak chart positions	Album
Title	Year	KOR DL	Album
"Always" (Note: Credited under Zerobaseone but is a solo performed by Zhang.)	2023	23	Youth in the Shade

=== Songwriting credits ===
All song credits are adapted from KOMCA, unless stated otherwise.

Year	Song Title	Artist	Album	Lyrics	
Year	Song Title	Artist	Album	Credited	With
2026	"Curious"	And2ble	Sequence 01: Curiosity	Yes	Lee Seu-ran, Ricky
2026	"Happy &"	And2ble	Sequence 01: Curiosity	Yes	Kim Gyu-vin, Brother Su

== Filmography ==
=== Television series ===
Year	Title	Role	Notes	Ref.
2025	To the Moon	Wei Lin	Special appearance	

=== Television shows ===
Year	Title	Role	Notes	Ref.
2023	Boys Planet	Contestant	Finished in first place	
2025	Knowing International High School	Cast member	From episode 3	
2025	Boys II Planet	Special mentor		
2025	I'm Sunny Thank You	MC		

=== Web shows ===
Year	Title	Role	Notes	Ref.
2023–2024	HaoHao's Good Times	MC	8 episodes	

=== Hosting ===
Year	Show	Note(s)	Ref.
2023	M Countdown	with Kim Ji-woong and Sung Han-bin on August 3	
2024	2024 KCON Hong Kong	with Sung Han-bin on March 31 (Day 2)	
2024	Music Bank	with Hong Eun-chae and Jo of Dxmon on May 24	
2024	Show! Music Core in Japan	with Choi Min-ho and Seok Matthew on June 29 (Day 1)	
2024	Music Bank	with Hong Eun-chae and Kim Tae-rae on September 6	
2025	2025 KCON LA	with Sung Han-bin on August 3 (Day 3)	
2025	M Countdown	with Sung Han-bin on August 21	
2026	Show! Music Core in Macau	Canceled	
2026	Inkigayo	with Han Yu-jin on May 28	
2026	Inkigayo	with Han Yu-jin on July 5	
2026	Show! Music Core	with Kim Gyu-vin and Yoo Seung-eon on July 18	

== Awards and nominations ==
Name of the award ceremony, year presented, category, nominee of the award, and the result of the nomination
Award ceremony	Year	Category	Nominee / Work	Result	Ref.
Blue Dragon Series Awards	2024	OST Popularity Award	"I Wanna Know" (Exchange 3)	Won	
Circle Chart Music Awards	2024	Viaje Global Popularity Award	Zhang Hao	Won	
D Awards	2025	UPICK Global Choice – Boy	Zhang Hao	Won	
Global Fan's Choice Awards (Note: GFCA is a global awards ceremony co-hosted by SPOTV News and global fandom platform Stardom.)	2026	Best OST of the Year	"Refresh!" (To the Moon)	Won	
Korean Wave Entertainment Awards	2026	Best OST	"Refresh!" (To the Moon)	Won	
K-World Dream Awards	2024	Global UPICK Choice	Zhang Hao	Won	
Newsis K-Expo Cultural Awards (Note: Established in 2019 and co-sponsored by Korea's Ministry of Culture, Sports and Tourism, Ministry of Foreign Affairs, Korea Creative Content Agency, Seoul Metropolitan Council, and the Seoul Tourism Organization, it awards cultural icons, businesses, and individuals who have contributed greatly to Hallyu, the Korean wave.)	2025	Global Netizen Award (OST)	"I Wanna Know" (Exchange 3)	Won	
Newsis K-Expo Cultural Awards	2026	Global Netizen Award (OST)	"Refresh!" (To the Moon)	Won	
SPOTV K-Pop Awards	2026	OST Award	"Refresh!" (To the Moon)	Won	
SPOTV K-Pop Awards	2026	Best Iconic Award	Zhang Hao	Won	
Weibo Awards	2026	Trending Singer of the Year	Zhang Hao	Won	
