= Exchange (TV program) =

South Korean reality series

- Season 4 promotional poster
- Hangul: 환승연애
- Lit.: Transit Love
- RR: Hwanseungyeonae
- MR: Hwansŭngyŏnae
- Genre: Reality show; Dating show
- Country of origin: South Korea
- Original language: Korean
- No. of seasons: 4
- No. of episodes: 76

Production
- Executive producer: Park Sang-hyuk
- Production company: CJ ENM

Original release
- Network: TVING
- Release: June 25, 2021 – present

Related
- EXchange: Another Beginning

Exchange (Korean: 환승연애; RR: Hwanseungyeonae; stylized as EXchange) also known as its Korean title literal meaning Transit Love, is an original South Korean dating reality show that airs every Wednesday on TVING, an OTT service in Korea. The series comprises four seasons. The first season aired in 2021, followed by the second season in 2022, the third season in 2023, and the fourth season in 2025.

== Overview ==
The reality show is about ex-couples that have broken up because of various reasons, gather to reunite with an ex-lover or find a new person. The show featured ten single men and women, who are brought together to live for weeks at a time, go on dates and get to know each other without knowing who each other's X (Note: X is a term for ex-lover in this show) is. The participants of this show are not strangers, but rather pairs of ex-lovers. Four pairs of ex-couples live under one roof, some of whom are hoping to reunite with their former flames and some who are ready to find romance with the other participants.

The main focus of the production team was the chat room system where the participant can choose a person they like and send them a message for each round. In addition, text messages saying "X chose you" and "No" started with a point that X's existence should be differentiated.

== Production ==
=== Development ===
For the season 1, Producer Park Sang-hyuk, who directed Strong Heart and Roommate on SBS and Island Musketeers, Seoul Mate, and Snail Hotel on Olive and tvN, is the head producer of Na Young-seok's division, and has produced everything from Grandpas Over Flowers to Youth Over Flowers, Three Meals a Day, Youn's Kitchen, etc.

Producer Lee Jin-ju, who was with Summer Vacation, took charge of directing for season 1 and season 2.

After Producer Lee Jin-ju moved to JTBC, Producer Kim In-ha took charge of the directing process for season 3 and season 4.

Complete Production Credit

All production credits were adapted from TVING Official website unless otherwise stated.

Season 1

- Park Sang-hyuk (producer)
- Lee Jin-ju (producing director)
- Choi Mi-rae
- Lee Hee-seon
- Kim Seul-gi
- Lee Seung-hwan
- Shin Hae-won
- Park Hyung-won
- Choi Yu-jin
- Lee Gwan-ui
- Jung Ji-won
- Jeon Yeong-sin
- Yeom Mi-ran (writer)
- Woo Ji-hoon (writer)
- Jung Ji-yeon (writer)

Season 2

- Lee Jin-ju (producing director)
- Jin Bo-mi
- Yeom Mi-ran (writer)
- Woo Ji-hoon (writer)
- Jung Ji-yeon (writer)
- Kim Hye-mi (writer)
- Kim Dan-bi (writer)

Season 3

- Kim In-ha (producing director)
- Lee In-sun (writer)
- Kang Dong-seok (writer)
- Kang Gwi-young (writer)

== Popularity ==
On December 15, 2021 TVING announced that it analyzed the total number of video on demand (VOD) users (UV) data for TVing users from December 2020 to December 2021 and selected a total of 15 contents (nine programs and six movies) by genre and preference. TVing's original "Exchange" topped weekly viewership for 10 consecutive weeks recorded to be the highest contribution to TVing's paid subscription, and was selected as 2021 entertainment show.

Although TVING did not reveal the exact number of views of "Exchange," it is undeniable that it is drawing high attention. It has become a hot topic in 43 videos including the full version of the show in a month since the first episode was released on June 26, surpassing 10.52 million, 4867 views. On top of that, the cast's Instagram and other social media are also booming. Not only is the number of YouTube subscribers increasing, but the number of Instagram followers has doubled, raising interest in individual cast members.

The biggest contributor to increasing the accessibility of TVING is definitely Exchange. It was promoted as a domestic original content that could captivate Korean viewers in the OTT market. Exchange captivated people in their 20s and 30s who are more active in watching TV, and it became an opportunity to promote TVING to the public and a representative program. As a result, TVING's paid subscribers and MAU (number of monthly users) rose sharply. In August, when EXchange was airing, MAU reached an all-time high of 3.87 million, and TVING usage rates soared in the third quarter. It was a result of the success that followed the syndrome of excessive immersion and proof of viewing on social media by people in their 20s and 30s.

== Move in rules ==
- You cannot reveal X or mention it directly.
- Any expression of feelings or skinship, except confession, is permitted.
- On the first day, your age and occupation are not revealed.
- You cannot share each other's SNS or contact information.
- Cleaning and meal duties are handled in a rotation of 2 people (1 male, 1 female).
- Residents eat together every evening.

== Fixed panelist ==
- Simon Dominic (Season 1-4)
- Lee Yong-jin (Season 1-4)
- Kim Ye-won (Season 1-4)
- Yura (Season 1-4)
- BamBam (Season 2) (Note: Fixed panelist from S2 Ep. 10 until S2 Ep. 20)

== Participants ==
Male participants
Female participants

=== Season 1 ===
Name	Birth year	Occupation	Notes	Ref.
Lee Hye-seon	1995	Graphic Designer		
Yoon Jeong-gwon	2001	Cafe Staff, Instagram Influencer		
Kim Bo-hyun	1995	Freelancer model and YouTuber (graduated from Sejong University's Department of Computer Engineering)		
Seon Ho-min	1992	Semiconductor technology sales representative (graduated from Sejong University's Department of Electronic Engineering)		
Go Min-yeong	1997	English instructor (studied English Language and Literature from Ewha Womans University)		
Lee Joo-hwey	1994	Game company employee (graduated from Yonsei University)		
Coco Lee	1991	Singer & Reporter (ex Blady and CocoSori member)		
Kwak Min-jae	1991	Restaurant manager		
Jeong Hye-im	1993	Model and YouTuber	Joined from Ep. 8 (Round 8)	
Lee Sang-woo	1995	Eyewear brand CEO	Joined from Ep. 10 (Round 15)	

Ex-Couples' Dating Timeline

Dating Timeline
Couple	Dating Timeline	Time of break-up before the show
Lee Hyeseon & Yoon Jeong-gwon	May 20, 2020 – October 8, 2020 (4 months and 18 days)	6 months
Kim Bo-hyun & Seon Ho-min	September 2017 – February 2021 (3 years and 5 months)	3 months
Go Min-young & Lee Joo-hwey	November 2018 – March 2019 (4 months and 28 days)	2 years
Coco Lee & Kwak Min-jae	May 25, 2009 – May 10, 2010 (1 year)	11 years
Jeong Hye-im & Lee Sang-woo	1 month	

Daily Text Message and Confession Result

Male participants
Female participants
Did not send text message
Quit the house for a while
Text message was not revealed
Choose each other

Text Message History
Participants	Round																			
Participants	1	2	3	4	5	6	7	8	9	10	11	12	13, 14	15	16	17	18	19	20	21
Lee Hye-seon	Yoon Jeong-gwon	Seon Ho-min	Yoon Jeong-gwon	Lee Joo-hwey	Lee Joo-hwey	Lee Joo-hwey								Lee Joo-hwey	Lee Joo-hwey		Lee Joo-hwey	Lee Joo-hwey		(Note: D-Day of Confession)
Yoon Jeong-gwon	Lee Hye-seon	Go Min-young	Go Min-young	Coco Lee	Go Min-young	Go Min-young		Go Min-young	Go Min-young	Go Min-young	Go Min-young	Go Min-young		Jeong Hye-im	Jeong Hye-im	Go Min-young	Go Min-young	Go Min-young		(Note: D-Day of Confession)
Kim Bo-hyun	Yoon Jeong-gwon	Yoon Jeong-gwon	Kwak Min-jae	Kwak Min-jae	Yoon Jeong-gwon			Kwak Min-jae	Kwak Min-jae		Kwak Min-jae	Kwak Min-jae		Kwak Min-jae	Kwak Min-jae			Kwak Min-jae		(Note: D-Day of Confession)
Seon Ho-min	Lee Hye-seon	Lee Hye-seon	Coco Lee	Go Min-young	Lee Hye-seon	Kim Bo-hyun		Jeong Hye-im	Jeong Hye-im	Jeong Hye-im	Coco Lee	Jeong Hye-im		Coco Lee	Jeong Hye-im			Kim Bo-hyun		(Note: D-Day of Confession)
Go Min-yeong	Lee Joo-hwey	Kwak Min-jae	Kwak Min-jae	Seon Ho-min	Yoon Jeong-gwon	Yoon Jeong-gwon		Yoon Jeong-gwon	Yoon Jeong-gwon	Lee Joo-hwey	Lee Joo-hwey	Lee Joo-hwey		Lee Joo-hwey	Lee Joo-hwey	Lee Joo-hwey	Lee Joo-hwey	Lee Joo-hwey		(Note: D-Day of Confession)
Lee Joo-hwey	Go Min-yeong	Go Min-yeong	Go Min-yeong	Lee Hye-seon	Go Min-yeong	Go Min-yeong		Go Min-yeong	Go Min-yeong		Go Min-yeong	Go Min-yeong		Go Min-yeong	Go Min-yeong	Go Min-yeong	Go Min-yeong	Go Min-yeong		(Note: D-Day of Confession)
Coco Lee	Yoon Jeong-gwon	Yoon Jeong-gwon	Yoon Jeong-gwon	Yoon Jeong-gwon	Lee Joo-hwey	Lee Joo-hwey		Lee Joo-hwey	Lee Joo-hwey	Kwak Min-jae	Lee Joo-hwey	Lee Joo-hwey		Lee Sang-woo	Lee Sang-woo		Kwak Min-jae	Kwak Min-jae		(Note: D-Day of Confession)
Kwak Min-jae	Kim Bo-hyun	Go Min-young	Kim Bo-hyun	Kim Bo-hyun	Kim Bo-hyun	Kim Bo-hyun		Kim Bo-hyun	Kim Bo-hyun	Kim Bo-hyun	Kim Bo-hyun	Kim Bo-hyun		Kim Bo-hyun	Kim Bo-hyun	Kim Bo-hyun		Kim Bo-hyun		(Note: D-Day of Confession)
Jeong Hye-im	(Note: Did not join in the House yet)							Kwak Min-jae	Seon Ho-min		Yoon Jeong-gwon	Yoon Jeong-gwon		Kwak Mn-jae	Seon Ho-min		Lee Sang-woo	Kwak Min-jae		(Note: D-Day of Confession)
Lee Sang-woo														Go Min-young	Go Min-young		Jeong Hye-im	Jeong Hye-im		(Note: D-Day of Confession)

Confession Result
Participants			Label
Kim Bo-hyun	↔	Kwak Min-jae	New
Go Min-young	↔	Lee Joo-hwey	Ex
Lee Hye-seon	→	Lee Joo-hwey	New
Yoon Jeong-gwon	→	Go Min-young	New
Jeong Hye-im	→	Kwak Min-jae	New
Coco Lee	→	Kwak Min-jae	Ex
Seon Ho-min	→	Kim Bo-hyun	Ex
Lee Sang-woo	→	Jeong Hye-im	Ex

=== Season 2 ===
Name	Birth year	Occupation	Notes	Ref.
Park Wonbin	1997	College student (attending the Department of Physical Education at Chung-Ang University)		
Kim Ji-soo	1997	English instructor (graduated from Chung-Ang University's Department of English Education)		
Kim Tae-i	1996	Brand editor & Barista		
Lee Ji-yeon	2001	College student (studied hotel management department at Kyunghee University)		
Jeong Gyu-min	1994	Video designer (graduated from Kookmin University College of Physical Education)		
Sung Hae-eun	1994	Flight attendant for Korean Air (graduated from Induk University Department of Social Welfare)	Joined from Ep. 5 (Round 4)	
Nam Hee-doo	1997	Ice Hockey athlete (graduated from Yonsei University's Department of Physical Education)	Joined from Ep. 6 (Round 5)	
Lee Na-yeon	1996	Sports Announcer (graduated from Yonsei University's Department of Sports Applications Industry)		
Jeong Hyun-gyu	1998	College student (Attending Department of Physical Education at Seoul National University)	Joined from Ep 15 (Round 14)	
Park Na-eon	1998	University student (Attending Department of Law at Hongik University)	Joined from Ep. 13 (Round 12)	
Seon Min-gi	1994	Visual Director	Voluntarily left the show in Episode 5 (Round 4)	
Choi Yi-hyun	1994	Makeup Artist & Model	Evicted in Episode 4 (Round 2) for violating the rules	

Ex-Couples' Dating Timeline

Dating Timeline
Couple	Dating Timeline	Time of break-up before the show
Sung Hae-eun & Jeong Gyu-min	January 2014 – February 2020; December 2020 – February 2021 (6 years and 4 months)	1 year and 3 months
Lee Na-yeon & Nam Hee-doo	January 2018 – September 2018; July 2019 – July 2020; January 2021 – December 2021 (2 years and 7 months)	5 months
Kim Ji-soo & Park Won-bin	August 3, 2017 – December 30, 2018 (1 year and 4 months)	3 years and 4 months
Lee Ji-yeon & Kim Tae-i	April 19, 2020 – November 7, 2020 (6 months and 18 days)	1 year and 6 months
Park Na-eon & Jung Hyun-gyu	April 2018 – November 2018; April 2019 – November 2019 (1 year and 4 months)	2 years and 5 months
Choi Yi-hyun & Jeon Min-gi	August 27, 2018 – November 30, 2019 (1 year and 3 months)	2 years and 7 months

Daily Text Message and Confession Result

Male participants
Female participants
Did not send text message
Quit the house
Text message was not revealed
Choose each other

Text Message History
Participants	Round																	
Participants	1	2	3	4	5	6	7	8	9	10	11	12	13	14	15	16	17	18
Park Won-bin	Lee Na-yeon	Lee Na-yeon		Lee Na-yeon	Lee Ji-yeon	Sung Hae-eun	Kim Ji-soo	Lee Ji-yeon	Sung Hae-eun	Kim Ji-soo	Kim Ji-soo	Lee Na-yeon	Kim Ji-soo	Lee Ji-yeon	Sung Hae-eun	Kim Ji-soo	Kim Ji-soo	Kim Ji-soo
Kim Ji-soo	Kim Tae-i	Jeong Gyu-min		Jeong Gyu-min		Jeong Gyu-min	Jeong Gyu-min	Jeong Gyu-min	Jeong Kyu-min	Park Won-bin	Park Won-bin	Nam Hee-doo	Park Won-bin	Kim Tae-i	Nam Hee-doo	Nam Hee-doo	Jeong Kyu-min	Jeong Gyu-min
Kim Tae-i	Choi Yi-hyun	Choi Yi-hyun		Lee Ji-yeon		Lee Na-yeon	Lee Na-yeon	Lee Ji-yeon	Lee Na-yeon	Kim Ji-soo	Lee Ji-yeon	Park Na-eon	Park Na-eon	Park Na-eon	Park Na-eon	Park Na-eon	Park Na-eon	Park Na-eon
Lee Ji-yeon	Jeong Gyu-min	Jeong Gyu-min	Jeong Gyu-min	Jeong Gyu-min	Park Won-bin	Kim Tae-i	Kim Tae-i	Kim Tae-i	Nam Hee-doo	Nam Hee-doo	Nam Hee-doo	Nam Hee-doo	Kim Tae-i	Kim Tae-i	Kim Tae-i	Kim Tae-i	Nam Hee-doo	Kim Tae-i
Jeong Gyu-min	Lee Ji-yeon	Kim Ji-soo		Kim Ji-soo	Lee Na-yeon	Lee Na-yeon	Kim Ji-soo	Kim Ji-soo	Lee Na-yeon	Lee Na-yeon	Lee Na-yeon	Lee Na-yeon	Lee Na-yeon	Lee Na-yeon	Lee Na-yeon	Park Na-eon	Park Na-eon	Kim Ji-soo
Sung Hae-eun				Jeong Gyu-min	Jeong Gyu-min	Jeong Gyu-min	Jeong Gyu-min	Jeong Gyu-min	Park Won-bin	Jeong Gyu-min	Jeong Gyu-min	Jeong Gyu-min	Jeong Gyu-min	Jeong Gyu-min	Jeong Hyun-gyu	Jeong Hyun-gyu	Jeong Hyun-gyu	Jeong Hyun-gyu
Nam Hee-doo					Sung Hae-eun	Lee Na-yeon	Lee Ji-yeon	Lee Na-yeon	Lee Ji-yeon	Lee Ji-yeon	Lee Na-yeon	Lee Ji-yeon	Lee Ji-yeon	Lee Na-yeon	Kim Ji-soo	Lee Na-yeon	Lee Na-yeon	Lee Na-yeon
Lee Na-yeon	Park Won-bin	Park Won-bin		Kim Tae-i	Jeong Gyu-min	Jeong Gyu-min	Kim Tae-i	Nam Hee-doo	Jeong Gyu-min	Jeong Gyu-min	Nam Hee-doo	Jeong Gyu-min	Jeong Gyu-min	Nam Hee-doo	Jeong Gyu-min	Nam Hee-doo	Nam Hee-doo	Nam Hee-doo
Jeong Hyun-gyu														Sung Hae-eun	Sung Hae-eun	Sung Hae-eun	Sung Hae-eun	Sung Hae-eun
Park Na-eon												Kim Tae-i	Kim Tae-i	Kim Tae-i	Kim Tae-i	Kim Tae-i	Kim Tae-i	Kim Tae-i
Seon Min-gi	Choi Yi-hyun	Choi Yi-hyun		Kim Ji-soo	voluntarily left the show													
Choi Yi-hyun	Seon Min-gi	Seon Min-gi	evicted from the house for violating rules															

Confession Result
Participants			Label
Park Na-eon	↔	Kim Tae-i	New
Sung Hae-eun	↔	Jeong Hyung-gyu	New
Lee Na-yeon	↔	Nam Hee-doo	Ex
Park Won-bin	→	Kim Ji-soo	Ex
Kim Ji-soo	→	Jeong Gyu-min	New
Jeong Gyu-min	→	Lee Na-yeon	New
Lee Ji-yeon	→	Nam Hee-doo	New

=== Season 3 ===
Name	Birth year	Occupation	Notes	Ref.
Jo Hwi-hyun	1999	College student (studied media studies department at Korea University)		
Lee Hye-won	1997	English instructor & aspiring diplomat for a foreign fashion company (graduated from Korea University)		
Seo Dong-jin	1992	CEO of a food manufacturing company		
Song Da-hye	1993	Former member of Bestie (studied Drama Studies from Dongguk University)		
Lee Ju-won	1994	Music Producer		
Lee Seo-kyung	1993	Dental hygienist		
Choi Chang-jin	1991	Architectural module startup strategic planner (graduated from Pennsylvania State University)	Joined from Episode 8	
Lee Yu-jung	1998	Fashion & Beauty CF Model (graduated from Inha Technical College's Department of Aviation)		
Kim Kwang-tae	1997	Imported Food Sales Manager (graduated from Kyunghee University's Department of Child and Family Studies)		
Kong Sang-jeong	1996	Short track starter referee, Senior specialized exercise healthcare, and a 2014 Winter Olympics gold medalist (graduated from Korea University)	Joined from Episode 6	
Seo Min-hyung	1996	Resident surgeon (graduated from Chung-Ang University's College of Medicine)	Joined from Episode 12	
Lee Jong-eun	1993	Internal medicine and pediatrics doctor (graduated from Yonsei University and Kyunghee University)	Joined from Episode 12	

Ex-Couples' Dating Timeline

Dating Timeline
Couple	Dating Timeline	Time of break-up before the show
Lee Hye-won & Jo Hwi-hyun	March 24, 2022 – August 24, 2022 (5 months)	1 year and 2 months
Song Da-hye & Seo Dong-jin	December 18, 2010 – July 2014; August 2014 – September 2018; December 2018 – June 19, 2023 (13 years)	4 months
Lee Seo-kyung & Lee Ju-won	June 7, 2020 – May 12, 2022; October 26, 2022 – May 16, 2023 (2 years and 6 months)	6 months
Lee Yu-jung & Choi Chang-jin	July 24, 2022 – June 7, 2023 (11 months)	5 months
Kong Sang-jeong & Seo Min-hyung	June 22, 2023 – September 12, 2023 (3 months)	1 month
Lee Jong-eun & Kim Kwangtae	May 2, 2022 – November 11, 2022 (6 months)	11 months

Daily Text Message, Official Dates and Confession Result

Male participants
Female participants
Did not send text message
Quit the house for a while
Text message was not revealed
Choose each other

Text Message History
Participants	Seoul Round									Jeju Round					
Participants	1	2	3	4	5	6	7	8	9	1	2	3	4	5	6
Jo Hwi-hyun	Lee Hye-won	Lee Yu-jung	Lee Yu-jung	Lee Hye-won	Lee Hye-won	Gong Sang-jong	Lee Seo-kyung	Lee Yu-jung	Lee Hye-won	Lee Seo-kyung	Lee Seo-kyung	Kong Sang-jeong	Lee Hye-won	Lee Seo-kyung	Lee Hye-won
Lee Hye-won	Kim Gwang-tae	Jo Hwi-hyun	Jo Hwi-hyun	Jo Hwi-hyun	Lee Ju-won	Jo Hwi-hyun	Jo Hwi-hyun	Seo Dong-jin	Seo Dong-jin	Seo Dong-jin	Seo Dong-jin	Seo Dong-jin	Seo Dong-jin	Seo Dong-jin	Seo Dong-jin
Seo Dong-jin		Lee Yu-jung	Lee Hye-won	Lee Yu-jung	Lee Yu-jung	Lee Seo-kyung	Lee Hye-won	Lee Yu-jung	Song Da-hye	Lee Hye-won	Song Da-hye	Lee Hye-won	Lee Hye-won	Lee Jong-eun	Lee Hye-won
Song Da-hye	Seo Dong-jin	Seo Dong-jin	Seo Dong-jin	Seo Dong-jin	Seo Dong-jin	Seo Dong-jin	Choi Chang-jin	Choi Chang-jin	Seo Dong-jin	Choi Chang-jin	Choi Chang-jin	Choi Chang-jin	Choi Chang-jin	Choi Chang-jin	Choi Chang-jin
Lee Ju-won	Lee Seo-kyung	Lee Seo-kyung	Lee Yu-jung	Gong Sang-jong	Lee Yu-jung	Lee Yu-jung	Lee Seo-kyung	Lee Yu-jung	Lee Yu-jung	Lee Yu-jung	Lee Yu-jung	Lee Yu-jung	Lee Yu-jung	Lee Seo-kyung	Lee Yu-jung
Lee Seo-kyung	Kim Gwang-tae	Kim Gwang-tae	Kim Gwang-tae	Kim Gwang-tae	Lee Ju-won	Kim Gwang-tae	Seo Dong-jin	Jo Hwi-hyun	Lee Ju-won	Kim Gwang-tae	Seo Min-hyung	Seo Dong-jin	Jo Hwi-hyun	Jo Hwi-hyun	Kim Gwang-tae
Choi Chang-jin						Song Da-hye	Lee Yu-jung	Song Da-hye	Lee Yu-jung	Song Da-hye	Lee Yu-jung	Lee Yu-jung	Lee Yu-jung	Lee Yu-jung	Lee Yu-jung
Lee Yu-jung	Kim Gwang-tae	Kim Gwang-tae	Lee Ju-won	Lee Ju-won	Lee Ju-won	Lee Ju-won	Lee Ju-won	Lee Ju-won	Lee Ju-won	Lee Ju-won	Lee Ju-won	Lee Ju-won	Choi Chang-jin	Choi Chang-jin	Lee Ju-won
Kim Gwang-tae		Song Da-hye	Lee Seo-kyung	Lee Seo-kyung	Lee Seo-kyung	Lee Yu-jung	Lee Yu-jung	Lee Yu-jung	Lee Yu-jung	Lee Yu-jung	Lee Yu-jung	Lee Yu-jung	Lee Seo-kyung	Lee Seo-kyung	Lee Seo-kyung
Lee Jong-eun										Kim Gwang-tae	Seo Dong-jin	Choi Chang-jin	Seo Dong-jin	Lee Ju-won	Lee Ju-won
Seo Min-hyung										Kong Sang-jeong	Lee Seo-kyung	Kong Sang-jeong	Kong Sang-jeong	Kong Sang-jeong	Kong Sang-jeong
Gong Sang-jeong				Lee Ju-won	Jo Hwi-hyun	Jo Hwi-hyun	Jo Hwi-hyun	Kim Gwang-tae	Choi Chang-jin	Jo Hwi-hyun	Seo Min-hyung	Jo Hwi-hyun	Seo Min-hyung	Seo Min-hyung	Seo Min-hyung

Official Dates
Round	Date	Participants		
Round 3	X Memories Date	Lee Hye-won	→	Seo Dong-jin
Round 3	X Memories Date	Song Da-hye	→	Lee Ju-won
Round 3	X Memories Date	Lee Seo-kyung	→	Kim Gwang-tae
Round 3	X Memories Date	Lee Yu-jung	→	Jo Hwi-hyun
Round 4	New Tenant Designated Date	Kong Sang-jeong	→	Lee Ju-won
Round 6 Round 7	Man Pick Date	Jo Hwi-hyun	→	Lee Seo-kyung
Round 6 Round 7	Man Pick Date	Seo Dong-jin	→	Lee Seo-kyung
Round 6 Round 7	Man Pick Date	Lee Ju-won	→	Lee Yu-jung
Round 6 Round 7	Man Pick Date	Kim Gwang-tae	→	Lee Seo-kyung
Round 7	New Tenant Designated Date	Choi Chang-jin	→	Song Da-hye
Jeju Round 1	Jeju Island Woman Pick Date	Lee Hye-won	↔	Seo Dong-jin
Jeju Round 1	Jeju Island Woman Pick Date	Song Da-hye	↔	Choi Chang-jin
Jeju Round 1	Jeju Island Woman Pick Date	Lee Yu-jung	↔	Lee Ju-won
Jeju Round 1	Jeju Island Woman Pick Date	Lee Seo-kyung	→	Seo Dong-jin
Jeju Round 1	Jeju Island Woman Pick Date	Kong Sang-jeong	→	Choi Chang-jin
Jeju Round 2	New Tenant Designated Date	Seo Min-hyung	→	Lee Seo-kyung
Jeju Round 2	New Tenant Designated Date	Lee Jong-eun	→	Seo Dong-jin
Jeju Round 3	Man X Pick Date (The male participants pick the date partner for their own X)	Lee Hye-won (Jo Hwi-hyun)	→	Seo Dong-jin
Jeju Round 3	Man X Pick Date (The male participants pick the date partner for their own X)	Song Da-hye (Seo Dong-jin)	→	Choi Chang-jin
Jeju Round 3	Man X Pick Date (The male participants pick the date partner for their own X)	Lee Seo-kyung (Lee Ju-won)	→	Seo Dong-jin
Jeju Round 3	Man X Pick Date (The male participants pick the date partner for their own X)	Lee Yu-jung (Choi Chang-jin)	→	Lee Ju-won
Jeju Round 3	Man X Pick Date (The male participants pick the date partner for their own X)	Kong Sang-jeong (Seo Min-hyung)	→	Jo Hwi-hyun
Jeju Round 3	Man X Pick Date (The male participants pick the date partner for their own X)	Lee Jong-eun (Kim Gwang-tae)	→	Choi Chang-jin
Jeju Round 4	Woman X Pick Date (The female participants pick the date partner for their own X)	Jo Hwi-hyun (Lee Hye-won)	→	Song Da-hye
Jeju Round 4	Woman X Pick Date (The female participants pick the date partner for their own X)	Seo Dong-jin (Song Da-hye)	→	Lee Jong-eun
Jeju Round 4	Woman X Pick Date (The female participants pick the date partner for their own X)	Lee Ju-won (Lee Seo-kyung)	→	Lee Jong-eun
Jeju Round 4	Woman X Pick Date (The female participants pick the date partner for their own X)	Choi Chang-jin (Lee Yu-jung)	→	Song Da-hye
Jeju Round 4	Woman X Pick Date (The female participants pick the date partner for their own X)	Seo Min-hyung (Kong Sang-jeong)	→	Lee Jong-eun
Jeju Round 4	Woman X Pick Date (The female participants pick the date partner for their own X)	Kim Gwang-tae (Lee Jong-eun)	→	Lee Yu-jung
Jeju Round 6	Two-way Pick Date	Jo Hwi-hyun	↔	Lee Seo-kyung
Jeju Round 6	Two-way Pick Date	Seo Dong-jin	↔	Lee Hye-won
Jeju Round 6	Two-way Pick Date	Song Da-hye	→	Choi Chang-jin
Jeju Round 6	Two-way Pick Date	Lee Ju-won	→	Song Da-hye
Jeju Round 6	Two-way Pick Date	Choi Chang-jin	→	Lee Seo-kyung
Jeju Round 6	Two-way Pick Date	Lee Yu-jung	→	Lee Ju-won
Jeju Round 6	Two-way Pick Date	Seo Min-hyung	→	Lee Yu-jung
Jeju Round 6	Two-way Pick Date	Kong Sang-jeong	→	Lee Ju-won
Jeju Round 6	Two-way Pick Date	Kim Gwang-tae	→	Lee Seo-kyung
Jeju Round 6	Two-way Pick Date	Lee Jong-eun	→	Lee Ju-won
Jeju Round 7	X Date	Jo Hwi-hyun	↔	Lee Hye-won
Jeju Round 7	X Date	Seo Dong-jin	↔	Song Da-hye
Jeju Round 7	X Date	Lee Ju-won	↔	Lee Seo-kyung
Jeju Round 7	X Date	Choi Chang-jin	↔	Lee Yu-jung
Jeju Round 7	X Date	Seo Min-hyung	↔	Kong Sang-jeong
Jeju Round 7	X Date	Kim Gwang-tae	↔	Lee Jong-eun
Jeju Round ?	Two-way Pick Date	Seo Dong-jin	↔	Lee Hye-won
Jeju Round ?	Two-way Pick Date	Lee Ju-won	↔	Lee Yu-jung
Jeju Round ?	Two-way Pick Date	Choi Chang-jin	↔	Song Da-hye
Jeju Round ?	Two-way Pick Date	Kim Gwang-tae	↔	Lee Seo-kyung
Jeju Round ?	Two-way Pick Date	Jo Hwi-hyun	→	
Jeju Round ?	Two-way Pick Date	Seo Min-hyng	→	
Jeju Round ?	Two-way Pick Date	Kong Sang-jeong	→	
Jeju Round ?	Two-way Pick Date	Lee Jong-eun	→	

Confession Result
Participants			Label
Seo Min-hyung	↔	Kong Sang-jeong	Ex
Seo Dong-jin	↔	Lee Hye-won	New
Choi Chang-jin	↔	Lee Yu-jung	Ex
Jo Hwi-hyun	→	Lee Hye-won	Ex
Song Da-hye	→	Choi Chang-jin	New
Lee Ju-won	→	Lee Yu-jung	New
Lee Seo-kyung	→	Lee Ju-won	Ex
Kim Gwang-tae	→	Lee Seo-kyung	New
Lee Jong-eun	→	Lee Ju-won	New

=== Season 4 ===
Name	Birth year	Occupation	Notes	Ref.
Jo Yoo-sik	2000	Contemporary dancer (graduated from School of Dance in Korea National University of Arts)		
Kwak Min-kyung	2001	Graduate student and dancer (attending Department of Arts Management in Sungkyunkwan University and graduated from Dankook University's Department of Dance)		
Kim Woo-jin	1996	Restaurant owner		
Hong Ji-yeon	1998	Web designer (studied industrial design)		
Jung Won-kyu	1993	Oriental Medicine Doctor (graduated from Daegu Haany University's Oriental Medicine)		
Park Ji-hyun	1998	Acting Instructor (graduated from School of Drama in Korea National University of Arts)		
Lee Jae-hyung	1999	Barista (studied Robotics Engineering)	Joined the show in Episode 7	
Choi Yun-nyeong	2000	Fashion Brand employee (graduated from Department of Visual and Fashion Design in Gachon University)		
Seong Baek-hyun	1998	Actor		
Park Hyun-ji	1997	Flight attendant for Korean Air (graduated from Inha Technical College's Department of Aviation)	Joined the show in Episode 4	
Shin Seung-yong	1992	Dermatologist (graduated from Seoul National University)	Joined the show in Episode 12	

Ex-Couples' Dating Timeline

Dating Timeline
Couple	Dating Timeline	Time of break-up before the show
Jo Yoo-sik & Kwak Min-kyung	July 29, 2017 - January 8, 2025 (7 years and 5 months)	5 months
Seong Baek-hyun & Park Hyun-ji	December 2018 - December 2020 (2 years)	4 years and 6 months
Kim Woo-jin & Hong Ji-yeon	March 3, 2024 - March 17, 2025 (1 year and 14 days)	3 months
Jung Won-kyu & Park Ji-hyun	August 2023 - June 2024 (10 months)	1 year
Lee Jae-hyung & Choi Yun-nyeong	March 14, 2018 - April 7, 2019 (1 year and 24 days)	6 years
Shin Seung-yong & Park Hyun-ji	January 2023 - September 2024 (1 year and 8 months)	9 months

Daily Text Messages, Official Dates and Confession Result

Male participants
Female participants
Did not send text message
Quit the house for a while
Text message was not revealed
Choose each other

Text Message History
Participants	Seoul Round									Japan Round			
Participants	1	2	3	4	5	6	7	8	9	1	2	3	4
Kwak Min-kyung	Kim Woo-jin	Seong Baek-hyun	Jung Won-kyu	Kim Woo-jin	Lee Jae-hyung	Jung Won-kyu	Kim Woo-jin	Jo Yoo-sik	Jo Yoo-sik	Kim Woo-jin	Kim Woo-jin	Jung Won-kyu	Jo Yoo-sik
Jo Yoo-sik	Kwak Min-kyung	Park Ji-hyun	Park Ji-hyun	Park Hyun-ji	Park Ji-hyun	Park Ji-hyun	Park Hyun-ji	Park Hyun-ji	Park Hyun-ji	Park Hyun-ji	Park Hyun-ji	Park Hyun-ji	Park Hyun-ji
Choi Yun-nyeong	Kim Woo-jin	Kim Woo-jin	Seong Baek-hyun	Seong Baek-hyun	Seong Baek-hyun	Seong Baek-hyun	Seong Baek-hyun	Seong Baek-hyun	Seong Baek-hyun	Seong Baek-hyun	Seong Baek-hyun	Seong Baek-hyun	Seong Baek-hyun
Kim Woo-jin		Choi Yun-nyeong	Park Ji-hyun	Kwak Min-kyung	Hong Ji-yeon	Hong Ji-yeon	Kwak Min-kyung	Hong Ji-yeon	Hong Ji-yeon	Hong Ji-yeon	Hong Ji-yeon	Hong Ji-yeon	Hong Ji-yeon
Hong Ji-yeon	Jung Won-kyu	Jung Won-kyu	Jung Won-kyu	Jung Won-kyu	Jung Won-kyu	Jung Won-kyu	Jung Won-kyu	Jung Won-kyu	Jung Won-kyu	Kim Woo-jin	Jung Won-kyu	Kim Woo-jin	Kim Woo-jin
Jung Won-kyu		Hong Ji-yeon	Kwak Min-kyung	Hong Ji-yeon	Hong Ji-yeon	Hong Ji-yeon	Hong Ji-yeon	Hong Ji-yeon	Park Ji-hyun	Hong Ji-yeon	Park Ji-hyun	Park Ji-hyun	Park Ji-hyun
Park Ji-hyun	Jo Yoo-sik	Jo Yoo-sik	Seong Baek-hyun	Jo Yoo-sik	Jo Yoo-sik	Jo Yoo-sik	Jo Yoo-sik	Lee Jae-hyung	Shin Seung-yong	Shin Seung-yong	Jo Yoo-sik	Jung Won-kyu	Jung Won-kyu
Seong Baek-hyun	Choi Yun-nyeong	Choi Yun-nyeong	Choi Yun-nyeong	Choi Yun-nyeong	Choi Yun-nyeong	Choi Yun-nyeong	Choi Yun-nyeong	Choi Yun-nyeong	Choi Yun-nyeong	Choi Yun-nyeong	Choi Yun-nyeong	Choi Yun-nyeong	Choi Yun-nyeong
Park Hyun-ji			Jo Yoo-sik	Jo Yoo-sik	Jo Yoo-sik	Jo Yoo-sik	Jo Yoo-sik	Jo Yoo-sik	Jo Yoo-sik	Jo Yoo-sik	Jo Yoo-sik	Jo Yoo-sik	Jo Yoo-sik
Lee Jae-hyung					Kwak Min-kyung	Park Ji-hyun	Park Ji-hyun	Park Ji-hyun	Park Ji-hyun	Park Hyun-ji	Park Hyun-ji	Park Hyun-ji	Park Hyun-ji
Shin Seung-yong									Park Hyun-ji	Park Ji-hyun	Park Hyun-ji	Park Hyun-ji	Park Hyun-ji

Official Dates
Round	Date	Participants		
Round 2	Date a Woman (The women gets to ask one of the male cast for a date in secret.)	Kwak Min-kyung	→	Seong Baek-hyun
Round 2	Date a Woman (The women gets to ask one of the male cast for a date in secret.)	Park Ji-hyun	→	Jo Yoo-sik
Round 2	Date a Woman (The women gets to ask one of the male cast for a date in secret.)	Hong Ji-yeon	→	Jung Won-kyu
Round 2	Date a Woman (The women gets to ask one of the male cast for a date in secret.)	Choi Yun-nyeong	→	Kim Woo-jin
Round 3	New Tenant Designated Date (The production team sets a date between the new tenant and her possible ideal type according to her X.)	Park Hyun-ji	→	Jo Yoo-sik
Round 5	New Tenant Designated Date (The new tenant enters a Chat Room and selects his date.)	Lee Jae-hyung	→	Kwak Min-kyung
Round 7	Keyword Date (The men would select their date based on they keywords they heard in the Talking Room.)	Jung Won-kyu	→	Choi Yun-nyeong
Round 7	Keyword Date (The men would select their date based on they keywords they heard in the Talking Room.)	Seong Baek-hyun	→	Hong Ji-yeon
Round 7	Keyword Date (The men would select their date based on they keywords they heard in the Talking Room.)	Lee Jae-hyung	→	Park Ji-hyun
Round 7	Keyword Date (The men would select their date based on they keywords they heard in the Talking Room.)	Kim Woo-jin	→	Kwak Min-kyung
Round 7	Keyword Date (The men would select their date based on they keywords they heard in the Talking Room.)	Jo Yoo-sik	→	Park Hyun-ji
Round 8	New Tenant Designated Date (The new tenant gets to ask a date with one female cast.)	Shin Seung-yong	→	Choi Yun-nyeong
Japan Round 1	Bye Jeju, Hello Japan Date (The women gets to pick their date in flight to Japan. If a man gets chosen twice, he is given the decision to pick.)	Park Hyun-ji	↔	Jo Yoo-sik
Japan Round 1	Bye Jeju, Hello Japan Date (The women gets to pick their date in flight to Japan. If a man gets chosen twice, he is given the decision to pick.)	Choi Yun-nyeong	↔	Seong Baek-hyun
Japan Round 1	Bye Jeju, Hello Japan Date (The women gets to pick their date in flight to Japan. If a man gets chosen twice, he is given the decision to pick.)	Hong Ji-yeon	↔	Jung Won-kyu
Japan Round 1	Bye Jeju, Hello Japan Date (The women gets to pick their date in flight to Japan. If a man gets chosen twice, he is given the decision to pick.)	Park Ji-hyun	↔	Shin Seung-yong
Japan Round 1	Bye Jeju, Hello Japan Date (The women gets to pick their date in flight to Japan. If a man gets chosen twice, he is given the decision to pick.)	Kwak Min-kyung	→	Shin Seung-yong
Japan Round 2	Man X Pick Date (The male participants pick the date partner for their own X)	Kwak Min-kyung (Jo Yoo-sik)	→	Kim Woo-jin
Japan Round 2	Man X Pick Date (The male participants pick the date partner for their own X)	Park Hyun-ji (Seong Baek-hyun & Shin Seung-yong)	→	Jo Yoo-sik
Japan Round 2	Man X Pick Date (The male participants pick the date partner for their own X)	Hong Ji-yeon (Kim Woo-jin)	→	Jung Won-kyu
Japan Round 2	Man X Pick Date (The male participants pick the date partner for their own X)	Park Ji-hyun (Jung Won-kyu)	→	Jo Yoo-sik
Japan Round 2	Man X Pick Date (The male participants pick the date partner for their own X)	Choi Yun-nyeong (Lee Jae-hyung)	→	Seong Baek-hyun
Japan Round 3	Woman X Pick Date (The female participants pick the date partner for their own X)	Jung Won-kyu (Park Ji-hyun)	→	Kwak Min-kyung
Japan Round 3	Woman X Pick Date (The female participants pick the date partner for their own X)	Seong Baek-hyun (Park Hyun-ji)	→	Choi Yun-nyeong
Japan Round 3	Woman X Pick Date (The female participants pick the date partner for their own X)	Shin Seung-yong (Park Hyun-ji)	→	Park Ji-hyun
Japan Round 3	Woman X Pick Date (The female participants pick the date partner for their own X)	Lee Jae-hyung (Choi Yun-nyeong)	→	Park Hyun-ji
Japan Round 3	Woman X Pick Date (The female participants pick the date partner for their own X)	Kim Woo-jin (Hong Ji-yeon)	→	Choi Yun-nyeong
Japan Round 3	Woman X Pick Date (The female participants pick the date partner for their own X)	Jo Yoo-sik (Kwak Min-kyung)	→	Choi Yun-nyeong
Japan Round 5	Two-Way Pick Date (The cast can only go on a date if they chose each other.)			
Japan Round 5	Two-Way Pick Date (The cast can only go on a date if they chose each other.)	Park Ji-hyun	↔	Lee Jae-hyung
Japan Round 5	Two-Way Pick Date (The cast can only go on a date if they chose each other.)	Hong Ji-yeon	↔	Jung Won-kyu
Japan Round 5	Two-Way Pick Date (The cast can only go on a date if they chose each other.)	Choi Yun-nyeong	↔	Seong Baek-hyun
Japan Round 5	Two-Way Pick Date (The cast can only go on a date if they chose each other.)	Park Hyun-ji	↔	Jo Yoo-sik
Japan Round 5	Two-Way Pick Date (The cast can only go on a date if they chose each other.)	Kwak Min-kyung	→	Kim Woo-jin
Japan Round 5	Two-Way Pick Date (The cast can only go on a date if they chose each other.)	Kim Woo-jin	→	Choi Yun-nyeong
Japan Round 5	Two-Way Pick Date (The cast can only go on a date if they chose each other.)	Shin Seung-yong	→	Kwak Min-kyung
Japan Round 6	X Date (The cast goes on a date with their X.)			
Japan Round 6	X Date (The cast goes on a date with their X.)	Jo Yoo-sik	↔	Kwak Min-kyung
Japan Round 6	X Date (The cast goes on a date with their X.)	Seong Baek-hyun	↔	Park Hyun-ji
Japan Round 6	X Date (The cast goes on a date with their X.)	Shin Seung-yong	↔	Park Hyun-ji
Japan Round 6	X Date (The cast goes on a date with their X.)	Kim Woo-jin	↔	Hong Ji-yeon
Japan Round 6	X Date (The cast goes on a date with their X.)	Jung Won-kyu	↔	Park Ji-hyun
Japan Round 6	X Date (The cast goes on a date with their X.)	Lee Jae-hyung	↔	Choi Yun-nyeong
Japan Round 6	Secret Date (The cast can go on a secret date after their X Date if they chose each other.)			
Japan Round 6	Secret Date (The cast can go on a secret date after their X Date if they chose each other.)	Jo Yoo-sik	↔	Park Hyun-ji
Japan Round 6	Secret Date (The cast can go on a secret date after their X Date if they chose each other.)	Seong Baek-hyun	↔	Choi Yun-nyeong
Japan Round 6	Secret Date (The cast can go on a secret date after their X Date if they chose each other.)	Shin Seung-yong	↔	Kwak Min-kyung
Japan Round 6	Secret Date (The cast can go on a secret date after their X Date if they chose each other.)	Jung Won-kyu	→	Choi Yun-nyeong
Japan Round 6	Secret Date (The cast can go on a secret date after their X Date if they chose each other.)	Kim Woo-jin	→	Choi Yun-nyeong
Japan Round 6	Secret Date (The cast can go on a secret date after their X Date if they chose each other.)	Lee Jae-hyung	→	
Japan Round 6	Secret Date (The cast can go on a secret date after their X Date if they chose each other.)	Park Ji-hyun	→	
Japan Round 6	Secret Date (The cast can go on a secret date after their X Date if they chose each other.)	Hong Ji-yeon	→	

Confession Result
Participants			Label
Kim Woo-jin	↔	Hong Ji-yeon	EX
Jung Won-kyu	↔	Park Ji-hyun	EX
Seong Baek-hyun	↔	Choi Yun-nyeong	NEW
Jo Yoo-sik	↔	Park Hyun-ji	NEW
Lee Jae-hyung	→	Park Ji-hyun	NEW
Shin Seung-yong	→	Park Hyun-ji	EX
Kwak Min-kyung	→	Jo Yoo-sik	EX

== Aftermath ==
As of October 2026, Season 3's Choi Chang-jin & Lee Yu-jung, and Season 4's Hong Ji-yeon & Kim Woo-jin remained dating.

In May 2025, Sung Hae-eun and Jeong Hyun-gyu who continued to date after the show as the series' only transfer couple has reportedly broken up.

On February 20, 2026, Season 1's Ko Min-young and Lee Ju-hwi announced their engagement. On April 17, 2026, Season 3's Seo Min-hyung and Kong Sang-jeong announced their engagement and got married on September 20, 2026.

As of July 2024, two exes from Season 3— Song Da-hye & Seo Dong-jin and Lee Seo-kyung & Lee Ju-won — who did not pick each other on the show decided to date outside the show.

In November 2025, Jeong Hye-im from Season 1 announced her engagement to a non-celebrity and got married on October 2026. On October 9, 2026, Lee Jong-eun from Season 3 announced her engagement to Lee Min-soo, the director of Resident Playbook and Spooky in Love and got married in November 2026.

As of October 2026, Season 2's Lee Na-yeon and Nam Heedo and Season 3's Lee Seo-kyung and Lee Ju-won are rumored to have broken up.

On May 8, 2026, Season 4's Shin Seung-yong and Kwak Min-kyung announced that they are dating.

== Episode list ==
Season	Episodes	Originally released	
Season	Episodes	First released	Last released
1	15	June 25, 2021	October 1, 2021
2	20	July 15, 2022	October 28, 2022
3	20	December 29, 2023	April 19, 2024
4	22	October 1, 2025	January 28, 2026

No. overall	No. in season	Title	Guest	Running Time	Original release date	Ref.
Season 1
1	1	"Can I live in the same house with my ex-lover?" (Korean: 헤어진 연인과 한 집에 살 수 있습니까?)	Juyeon	88 minutes	June 25, 2021	
2	2	"Can you release a new song about your ex-lover" (Korean: 전 연인의 새로운 시작을 음원해줄 수 있습니까)	Juyeon	74 minutes	July 2, 2021	
3	3	"The Moment I Realized the Breakup" (Korean: 이별을 실감한 순간)	Woodz	61 minutes	July 9, 2021	
4	4	"How to Send a Past Lover" (Korean: 지나간 연인을 보내는 방법)	Woodz	63 minutes	July 16, 2021	
5	5	"Is Jealousy Love too?" (Korean: 질투도 사랑일까?)	Woodz	78 minutes	July 23, 2021	
6	6	"The Real Reason of Our Breakup" (Korean: 우리가 헤어진 진짜 이유)	Kwon Hyun-bin	81 minutes	July 30, 2021	
7	7	"We're All Someone's X" (Korean: 우리는 모두 누군가의 X였다)	Kwon Hyun-bin	111 minutes	August 6, 2021	
8	8	"Someone is Curious About Your X" (Korean: 누군가 당신의 X를 궁금해합니다)	Chani	143 minutes	August 13, 2021	
9	9	"Can We Become Friends?" (Korean: 우리가 친구가 될 수 있을까?)	Gim Yoon-ju	100 minutes	August 20, 2021	
10	10	"It's About Time"	Gim Yoon-ju	127 minutes	August 27, 2021	
11	11	"Cross the Line" (Korean: 선을 넘다)	Woodz	164 minutes	September 3, 2021	
12	12	"Gaps and Cracks" (Korean: 틈과 균열)	Woodz	142 minutes	September 10, 2021	
13	13	"Truth Game" (Korean: 진실게임)	Gim Yoon-ju	162 minutes	September 17, 2021	
14	14	"Last Timing" (Korean: 마지막 타이밍)	Gim Yoon-ju	118 minutes	September 24, 2021	
15	15	"Confession" (Korean: 고백)	Gim Yoon-ju	129 minutes	October 1, 2021	
Season 2
16	1	"Long Time no See, First Time to Meet You" (Korean: 오랜만, 처음 뵙겠습니다)	BamBam	95 minutes	July 15, 2022	
17	2	"Introducing My X" (Korean: 내 X를 소개합니다)	BamBam	70 minutes	July 15, 2022	
18	3	"Who are You?" (Korean: 당신은 누구신가요?)	BamBam	88 minutes	July 22, 2022	
19	4	"Surprise Party" (Korean: 서프라이즈 파티)	Kang Seung-sik	89 minutes	July 29, 2022	
20	5	"Your X Chose You" (Korean: 당신의 X는 당신을 선택했습니다)	Kang Seung-sik	98 minutes	July 29, 2022	
21	6	"There is My X Inside" (Korean: 이 안에 내 X가 있다)	Kang Seung-sik	106 minutes	August 5, 2022	
22	7	"Story that Only I don't Know" (Korean: 나만 몰랐던 이야기)	J.YOU	109 minutes	August 12, 2022	
23	8	"Date Result" (Korean: 데이트의 결말)	J.YOU	79 minutes	August 12, 2022	
24	9	"Ways to Protect X" (Korean: X를 지키는 방법)	J.YOU	76 minutes	August 19, 2022	
25	10	"Secret Date" (Korean: 비밀데이트)	— (Note: BamBam became a fixed panelist therefore no guest invited)	132 minutes	August 26, 2022	
26	11	"Face One's Memory" (Korean: 기억을 마주하다)	—	132 minutes	September 2, 2022	
27	12	"X is Waiting for You" (Korean: X가 당신을 기다리고 있습니다)	—	97 minutes	September 9, 2022	
28	13	"Secret Conversation" (Korean: 비밀 대화)	—	112 minutes	September 9, 2022	
29	14	"Realization" (Korean: 각성)	—	128 minutes	September 16, 2022	
30	15	"Uncomfortable" (Korean: 불편)	Gray (Note: BamBam absent due to schedule therefore Gray was invited as Guest)	188 minutes	September 23, 2022	
31	16	"There's No Secret" (Korean: 비밀은 없다)	Gray	147 minutes	September 30, 2022	
32	17	"Hold Hands" (Korean: 손을 잡다)	—	179 minutes	October 7, 2022	
33	18	"Regrets" (Korean: 미련)	—	120 minutes	October 14, 2022	
34	19	"Last Date" (Korean: 마지막 데이트)	—	168 minutes	October 21, 2022	
35	20	"Confession" (Korean: 고백)	—	175 minutes	October 28, 2022	
Season 3
36	1	"Again, Start" (Korean: 다시, 시작)	Ryeoun	126 minutes	December 29, 2023	
All participants came to the Exchange House. At last, it revealed that Lee Hye-won and Cho Hwi-hyun are an ex-couple.
37	2	"Story that Only Two of Us Know" (Korean: 둘 만 알던 이야기)	Ryeoun	97 minutes	January 5, 2024	
The arrival of X Introduction letter.
38	3	"Such a Long Farewell" (Korean: 이토록 오랜 이별)	Chani	102 minutes	January 5, 2024	
The four men in the show select a picture of a place quite memorable to them. The women in the house choose one of those pictures to determine with whom they will be going on a date the next day.
39	4	"A Piece of Memory" (Korean: 추억의 한 조각)	Chani	122 minutes	January 12, 2024	
All eight participants prepare for their very first date after coming to the dating reality show.
40	5	"Baby, I'm Sorry" (Korean: 자기야 미안해)	Kim Min-kyu	130 minutes	January 19, 2024	
41	6	"What Will You Do Tomorrow?" (Korean: 내일 뭐해?)	Kim Min-kyu	124 minutes	January 26, 2024	TBA
42	7	"About My X" (Korean: 나의 X에 대하여)	Seok Matthew of Zerobaseone	120 minutes	February 2, 2024	
43	8	"He Will Come No Matter What" (Korean: 무조건 온다)	Seok Matthew	147 minutes	February 2, 2024	
44	9	"Two Meanings" (Korean: 두 가지 의미)	Yuju	151 minutes	February 9, 2024	
45	10	"X Or New"	Kim Yo-han	135 minutes	February 16, 2024	
46	11	"We Still Don't Know Each Other" (Korean: 우린 아직도 서로를 모른다)	Kim Yohan	130 minutes	February 23, 2024	
47	12	"Place that You Left" (Korean: 네가 떠난 자리)	Lim Seul-ong	130 minutes	March 1, 2024	
48	13	"I Know X" (Korean: X를 알다)	Lim Seul-ong	93 minutes	March 1, 2024	
49	14	"Talk to Me" (Korean: 나랑 얘기 좀 해)	Bona	131 minutes	March 8, 2024	
50	15	"Our Time is Still Frozen on That Day" (Korean: 우리의 시간은 아직 그날에 멈춰있다)	Kim Min-kyu	194 minutes	March 15, 2024	TBA
51	16	"The Person who Made Your Heart Flutter Today" (Korean: 오늘 당신을 설레게 한 사람)	Kim Min-kyu	136 minutes	March 22, 2024	
52	17	"The Untold Story" (Korean: 말하지 못한 이야기)	Kim Yohan	125 minutes	March 29, 2024	TBA
53	18	"Things I Knew After Broke Up" (Korean: 이별 후에 알게 된 것들)	Kim Yohan	157 minutes	April 5, 2024	
54	19	"Perhaps It's the Last Moment" (Korean: 어쩌면 마지막 순간)	Yoo Yeon-seok	179 minutes	April 12, 2024	
55	20	"Again, Start" (Korean: 다시, 시작)	Yoo Yeon-seok	161 minutes	April 19, 2024	
Season 4
56	1	"Please Take Care of Them" (Korean: 잘 부탁드립니다, 그를)	Nam Yoon-su	113 minutes	October 1, 2025	TBA
Seong Baek-hyun, Choi Yun-nyeong, Kim Woo-jin, Kwak Min-kyung, Hong Ji-yeon, Jung Won-kyu, Park Ji-hyun, and Jo Yoo-sik enter the house. The cast reads introduction letters written by their exes aloud. The women get to ask the men for a date in secret.
57	2	"I Put the Breakup in the Closet" (Korean: 이별을 옷장에 넣어두었다)	Nam Yoon-su	97 minutes	October 1, 2025	TBA
The cast receives farewell packages from their exes, which must be opened in secret. The EX chat room for women opens.
58	3	"Bittersweet Time" (Korean: 달콤 쌉싸르한 시간)	Myung Jae-hyun and Sungho of BoyNextDoor	114 minutes	October 8, 2025	TBA
Jo Yoo-sik and Kwak Min-kyung are revealed to be exes. The cast members go on their first dates.
59	4	"As I Passed By without Noticing" (Korean: 무심코 지나갈 무렵)	Myung Jae-hyun and Sungho	140 minutes	October 8, 2025	TBA
Jung Won-kyu and Kwak Min-kyung go on an unofficial date. (Note: Unofficial date is a date that is not prompted by the production team.) Jo Yoo-sik goes on a date with the new tenant, Park Hyun-ji, before she enters the house. Seong Baek-hyun, Kim Woo-jin, Park Ji-hyun, Hong Ji-yeon, and Choi Yun-nyeong go bowling.
60	5	"Restless Night" (Korean: 소란한밤)	Mingyu and S.Coups of Seventeen	92 minutes	October 15, 2025	TBA
Seong Baek-hyun and Park Hyun-ji are revealed to be exes.
61	6	"The Speed of the Breakup Depends on the Person" (Korean: 이별의 속도는 다르게 호른다)	Dawn	101 minutes	October 22, 2025	TBA
Kim Woo-jin and Kwak Min-kyung, Jo Yoo-sik and Park Hyun-ji, and Jung Won-kyu and Hong Ji-yeon each go on unofficial dates . The cast reveals their occupations.
62	7	"The Door Opens" (Korean: 문이 열)	Dawn	114 minutes	October 22, 2025	TBA
Chatting room opens. Kwak Min-kyung is chosen by the new tenant, Lee Jae-hyung, for a date. Seong Baek-hyun and Choi Yun-nyeong go on an unofficial date . Park Ji-hyun and Jung Won-kyu and Kim Woo-jin and Hong Ji-yeon are revealed to be exes.
63	8	"Insincere Love" (Korean: 진심아닌사랑)	Roy Kim	120 minutes	October 29, 2025	TBA
Lee Jae-hyung enters the house. The talking room opens. Jung Won-kyu and Park Ji-hyun's preliminary meeting and past is revealed.
64	9	"Easy to Misunderstand, but Hard to Understand" (Korean: 오해는 쉽고 이해는 어렵다)	pH-1	110 minutes	November 5, 2025	TBA
The men get to choose their dates based on keywords given in the talking room.
65	10	"Our Night Shines Brighter than the Day" (Korean: 우리의 밤은 낮보다 반짝인다)	Lee Min-hyuk	117 minutes	November 12, 2025	TBA
The cast reveals their ages. X Room is opened and a new rule is imposed: only one of the exes gets to enter the X Room; if both of them want to enter, they have to talk to each other and decide who gets to enter. Jo Yoo-sik enters the X Room.
66	11	"You, Back Then" (Korean: 그때, 그대)	Lee Min-hyuk	125 minutes	November 19, 2025	TBA
Jung Won-kyu, Kim Woo-jin, Park Hyun-ji, and Lee Jae-hyung explore their respective X rooms. Lee Jae-hyung and Choi Yun-nyeong are revealed to be exes.
67	12	"A Different Time" (Korean: 또 다른 시간)	Kwak Si-yang	127 minutes	November 26, 2025	TBA
Shin Seung-yong enters the house and selects Choi Yun-nyeong as his first date. Jo Yoo-sik and Park Hyun-ji go on a date . The cast gets notified that they are flying to Japan, and the women get to pick who they want to travel and go on a date with. Shin Seung-yong is revealed to be Park Hyun-ji's second ex in the house.
68	13	"Leaving This Night in Seoul" (Korean: 이밤, 서울에 남기다)	Kwak Si-yang	95 minutes	December 3, 2025	TBA
The cast spends their last day in Seoul and fly to Japan.
69	14	"X's X" (Korean: X의 X)	Kwak Si-yang	90 minutes	December 3, 2025	TBA
The exes are revealed to everyone. Shin Seung-yong and Park Hyun-ji's preliminary meeting and past is revealed.
70	15	"Time I Thought I Had Forgotten" (Korean: 잊은 줄 알았던 시간)	Noh Sang-hyun	121 minutes	December 10, 2025	TBA
The men get to choose their ex's date for the next day.
71	16	"The Breakup Lingering in my Throat" (Korean: 묵 끝에 이별이 걸리다)	Noh Sang-hyun	129 minutes	December 17, 2025	TBA
The women get to choose their ex's date for the next day.
72	17	"How to Hold Onto You" (Korean: 너를 붙잡는 방법)	Loco and Code Kunst	105 minutes	December 24, 2025	TBA
The cast go on their designated dates.
73	18	"A Sleepless Night, and the Rain Falls" (Korean: 잠 못 드는 밤 비는 내리고)	Loco and Code Kunst	111 minutes	December 31, 2025	TBA
Jo Yoo-sik and Park Hyun-ji go on a date . The two-way pick date creates more tension between exes.
74	19	"A Summer Night of Regret" (Korean: 여름밤, 후회)	Zerobaseone's Zhang Hao and Sung Han-bin	107 minutes	January 7, 2026	TBA
Park Ji-hyun and Lee Jae-hyung, Park Hyun-ji and Jo Yoo-sik, Hong Ji-yeon and Jung Won-kyu, and Choi Yun-nyeong and Seong Baek-hyun went on a date. Later in the evening, the Truth Game was held.
75	20	"So... this is goodbye, then" (Korean: 안녕이라, 그래)	Kim Yo-han	129 minutes	January 14, 2026	TBA
The exes went on their X dates. After their dates with their X, Jo Yoo-sik and Park Hyun-ji and Seong Baek-hyun and Choi Yun-nyeong went on secret dates.
76	21	"Again, Never Again" (Korean: 다시, 다신)	Jennie Kim	121 minutes	January 21, 2026	TBA
The final selection day.
77	22	"Untold Stories" (Korean: 못다 한 이야기)	-	62 minutes	January 28, 2026	TBA
Clips such as Seong Baek-hyun and Hong Ji-yeon's keyword date, Seong Baek-hyun's impersonating Park Ji-hyun, the men's reaction to Park Hyun-ji's entrance, the story behind Kim Woo-jin's age, etc. were shown.

== Spin-off ==
=== EXchange: Another Beginning ===
A spin-off series titled "EXchange: Another Beginning" was released on January 22, 2025, featuring several members from all three seasons.

Participants of EXchange: Another Beginning
Name	Birth year	Occupation	Notes	Ref.
Lee Hye-seon	1995	Graphic Designer	From Season 1. Ex-girlfriend of Yoon Jeong-gwon.	
Kwak Min-jae	1991	Restaurant manager	From Season 1. Ex-boyfriend of Coco Lee.	
Jeong Hye-im	1993	Model and YouTuber	From Season 1. Ex-girlfriend of Lee Sang-woo.	
Jeong Gyu-min	1994	Video designer (graduated from Kookmin University College of Physical Education)	From Season 2. Ex-boyfriend of Sung Hae-eun.	
Lee Ji-yeon	2001	College student (studied hotel management department at Kyunghee University)	From Season 2. Ex-girlfriend of Kim Tae-i.	
Park Na-eon	1998	University student (studied Law at Hongik University)	From Season 2. Ex-girlfriend of Jung Hyun-gyu.	
Jo Hwi-hyun	1999	College student (studied media studies department at Korea University)	From Season 3. Ex-boyfriend of Lee Hye-won.	
Kim Kwang-tae	1997	Imported Food Sales Manager (graduated from Kyunghee University Department of Child and Family Studies)	From Season 3. Ex-boyfriend of Lee Jong-eun.	
Park Ji-yeon	1999		Friend of Lee Ji-yeon from Season 2.	
Lee Kwan-woo	1991	Body Profile Studio Owner	Friend of Jo Hwi-hyun from Season 3.	

Results

Results
Participants
Park Na-eon	↔	Jo Hwi-hyun
Park Ji-yeon	↔	Kim Kwang-tae
Jeong Hye-im	↔	Jeong Gyu-min
Lee Ji-yeon	→	Kwak Min-jae
Kwak Min-jae	→	Jeong Hye-im
Lee Kwan-woo	→	Lee Hye-seon
Lee Hye-seon	→	gave up

== Original soundtrack ==
The following are the songs included in the original soundtrack (OST) single album, and the sorting criteria are in order of release

Season	Part	Release Date	Song Title	Artist	Ref.
Season 1	Part.1	July 2, 2021	"Sun or Suck" (해가 될까)	Woodz	
Season 1	Part.2	September 3, 2021	"Thank You"	Ha Sung-woon	
Season 2	Part.1	July 29, 2022	"What If"	Kang Seung-sik	
Season 2	Part.2	September 2, 2022	"The Only One Have to Forget" (잊어야 하는 그대)	Wheein	
Season 2	Part.3 갈등 Conflict	September 23, 2022	"In My Spot" (제자리)	Kim Yejoon	
Season 2	Part.3 갈등 Conflict	September 23, 2022	"All a Lie"	eSNa	
Season 2	Part.4 다시, 설렘 Again, heart flutters	September 24, 2022	"Timing" (타이밍)	KOYO	
Season 2	Part.4 다시, 설렘 Again, heart flutters	September 24, 2022	"My World, My First" (내 세상이 내 처음이)	Jungtune	
Season 2	Part.5	September 30, 2022	"Rewind"	Lee Hae-in	
Season 3	Part.1	January 5, 2024	"On my mind" (예고 없이)	Paul Blanco, Heize	
Season 3	Part.2	January 12, 2024	"Love Remnants" (미련하다)	Roy Kim	
Season 3	Part.3	January 14, 2024	"Pause"	Eddie and the Bricks	
Season 3	Part.3	January 14, 2024	"Together" (머무르)	onthedal	
Season 3	Part.3	January 14, 2024	"Sunset"	soo	
Season 3	Part.3	January 14, 2024	"They sing for us"	Luca minor	
Season 3	Part.4	January 19, 2024	"I Wanna Know"	Zhang Hao	
Season 3	Part.5	January 26, 2024	"Last Minute" (뻐끔)	Choi Yu-ree	
Season 3	Part 6	February 2, 2024	"We're Done" (우리 헤어지자) (Female ver.)	Dew	
Season 3	Part 6	February 2, 2024	"We're Done" (우리 헤어지자) (Male ver.)	4Bout	
Season 3	Part 6	February 2, 2024	"Competitor"	Choi Jung-in	
Season 3	Part 6	February 2, 2024	"Unpredictable"	ABOPF	
Season 3	Part 6	February 2, 2024	"Word"	Inni	
Season 3	Part 6	February 2, 2024	"Everything"	Inni	
Season 3	Part 6	February 2, 2024	"Decision"	Choi Jung-in	
Season 3	Part 6	February 2, 2024	"Cloud"	Yoon Chae-young	
Season 3	Part 6	February 2, 2024	"Tiki Taka"	Park Jung-eun	
Season 3	Part 6	February 2, 2024	"My Ex-Girlfriend"	Shin Hyun-pill	
Season 3	Part 6	February 2, 2024	"In Between"	Yoon Chae-young	
Season 3	Part 6	February 2, 2024	"Honey"	Kim Yeon-jeong	
Season 3	Part 6	February 2, 2024	"Rookie"	Park Jung-eun	
Season 3	Part 6	February 2, 2024	"We're Done" (우리 헤어지자) (Pf ver.)	Choi Jung-in, Kim Yeon-jeong	
Season 3	Part 6	February 2, 2024	"We're Done" (우리 헤어지자) (Lo-Fi ver.)	Choi Jung-in, Shin Young-pill	
Season 3	Part.7	March 1, 2024	"Let the Star Shine Us Again" (이별이 다시 우릴 비춰주길)	Lee Sung-kyung, Lim Seul-ong	
Season 3	Part.8	March 8, 2024	"All Blue"	Heon Seo	
Season 3	Part.8	March 8, 2024	How We Do? (어차피 만날 것 같아)	Shirt	
Season 4	Part.1	October 1, 2025	"Ruin My Life"	BoyNextDoor	
Season 4	Part.2	October 15, 2025	"Love on the Canvas"	Sohee	
Season 4	Part.3	October 24, 2025	"As You Wish"	Shownu	
Season 4	Part.4	October 29, 2025	"A Day" (하루)	Suzy	
Season 4	Part.5	November 5, 2025	"Slow Burning Fire"	Hwang So-yoon	
Season 4	Part.6	November 12, 2025	"Still Here"	Doyoung	
Season 4	Part.7	November 20, 2025	"Remember"	Yura	
Season 4	Part.8	November 27, 2025	"Velvet Trigger"	Jay B	
Season 4	Part.9	December 10, 2025	"'thinkin bout u"	HAAN and Chan	
Season 4	Part.9	December 10, 2025	"Dream Again"	HYNGSN	
Season 4	Part.10	January 8, 2026	"Even if we fight, can you just remember this? Make eye contact, hold each other's hands, and try not to hurt each other with a low voice and pretty tone"	Minsu	

=== Peak chart appearance ===
List of charted soundtracks, title, year, peak chart positions, artist, and album
Title	Year	Peak	Artist	Album
Title	Year	KOR	Artist	Album
"Love Remnants" (미련하다; Miryeonhada)	2024	— (Note: "Love Remnants" did not enter the Circle Digital Chart, but peaked at number 77 on the Download Chart.)	Roy Kim	Exchange 3 Part.2 OST
"I Wanna Know"	2024	80	Zhang Hao	Exchange 3 Part.4 OST
"Let the Star Shine Us Again"	2024	— (Note: "Let the Star Shine Us Again" did not enter the Circle Digital Chart but peaked at number 93 on the Download Chart and peaked at number 163 on the BGM Chart.)	Lee Sung-kyung & Lim Seul-ong	Exchange 3 Part.7 OST
"Ruin My Life"	2025	— (Note: "Ruin My Life" did not enter Circle Digital Chart but peaked at number 68 on the Download Chart.)	BoyNextDoor	Exchange 4 Part.1 OST
"Love on the Canvas"	2025	127	Sohee	Exchange 4 Part.2 OST
"A Day"	2025	— (Note: "A Day" did not enter Circle Digital Chart but peaked at number 42 on the Download Chart.)	Suzy	Exchange 4 Part.4 OST

== Awards and nominations ==
List of Awards & nominations, showing the name of the award ceremony, year presented, category, nominee of the award, and the result of the nomination
Award ceremony	Year	Category	Nominee / work	Result	Ref.
Blue Dragon Series Awards	2022	Best Entertainment Program	EXchange	Won	
Blue Dragon Series Awards	2022	Best Male Entertainer	Lee Yong-jin	Nominated	
Blue Dragon Series Awards	2022	Best Female Entertainer	Yura	Nominated	
Blue Dragon Series Awards	2023	Best Entertainment Program	EXchange 2	Nominated	
Blue Dragon Series Awards	2023	Best Female Entertainer	Yura	Nominated	
Blue Dragon Series Awards	2023	Best New Male Entertainer	BamBam	Nominated	
Blue Dragon Series Awards	2024	OST Popularity Award	Zhang Hao - "I Wanna Know"	Won	
Newsis K-Expo Cultural Awards	2025	Global Netizen Award – OST	Zhang Hao - "I Wanna Know"	Won	

== Citation ==
=== Notes ===
Notes about the show

Notes about the soundtrack
