= I'm Sunny Thank You =

South Korean television program

- Promotional poster
- Korean: 아임써니땡큐
- Genre: Reality television; Travel documentary
- Created by: Kim Young-jin
- Written by: Yoo Ji-hye; Oh Yu-mi; Choi Go-eun; Yoon Ha-na; Park Hyung-wook; Son Ji-a; Lee Si-woo; Jo Min-ju; Lee Ji-seon
- Presented by: Kim Seong-joo; Kang So-ra; Yuqi; Zhang Hao; Cao Lu; Patricia Yiombi
- Starring: Kang So-ra; Kim Bo-mi; Kim Min-young; Lee Eun-ji
- Original language: Korean
- No. of episodes: 6

Production
- Executive producer: An Su-yeong
- Producers: Kim Jun-hyeon; Lim Chan
- Production location: China
- Production company: Munhwa Broadcasting Corporation

Original release
- Network: MBC TV
- Release: July 5 – August 9, 2025

Related
- Sunny

I'm Sunny Thank You is a South Korean television program, distributed and syndicated by MBC on Saturdays at 08:40 pm (KST), premiered on July 5, 2025. The program featured the actresses from the 2011 film Sunny.

== Background and overview ==
I'm Sunny Thank You is a travel documentary featuring the actresses from the 2011 comedy-drama film Sunny. The show highlighted the 14-year friendship of the actresses when overcoming hardships and adversities during their friendship trip with the theme of "the reunion of best friends who are now living their own lives."

== Production ==
=== Casting ===
In June 2025, the production team revealed that seven actresses from Sunny decided to appear on the show without hesitation. Kim Seong-joo, Kang So-ra, Yuqi, and Zhang Hao was officially revealed as the MC of the show on June 24.

== Cast ==
=== Cast member ===
- Kang So-ra
- Kim Bo-mi
- Kim Min-young
- Lee Eun-ji

=== MC ===
- Kim Seong-joo
- Kang So-ra
- Yuqi
- Zhang Hao
- Cao Lu
- Patricia Yiombi

== Episode ==
No.	Title	Original release date	Ref.
1	"Sunnyz's Exciting Travel Begins!"; Transliteration: "sseonijeu-eui dugundugun yeohaeng sijak!" (Korean: 써니즈의 두근두근 여행 시작!)	July 5, 2025	
The Sunny cast member (Kang So-ra, Park Jin-joo, Nam Bo-ra, Kim Bo-mi, Kim Min-young, Shim Eun-kyung) reunited at a cafe and met Lee Eun-ji. After that, Kang So-ra, Kim Bo-mi, Kim Min-young, and Lee Eun-ji set off on their trip to China together with excitement.
2	"Sunnyz's Traditional Cultural Experience"; Transliteration: "sseonijeu-eui jeontong munhwa cheheomgi" (Korean: 써니즈의 전통 문화 체험기)	July 12, 2025	TBA
3	"Sunnyz Enjoying a Staycation, Eating on Camera at the Pool"; Transliteration: "hokangseu-reul jeulgireo on seonijeu, suyeongjang-eseo peolchyeoji-neun kamera meokbang" (Korean: 호캉스를 즐기러 온 써니즈, 수영장에서 펼쳐지는 카메라 먹방)	July 19, 2025	TBA
4	"Sora's packed schedule, Sunnyz' winning!" Transliteration: "sora-ga kkwakkkwak chaeun iljeong, ssseonijeu igyeonae!" (Korean: 소라가 꽉꽉 채운 일정, 써니즈 이겨내!)	July 26, 2025	TBA
5	"Sunnyz Wide-eyed Aerial Acrobatics, a Feat only Seen on Beidi Mountain"; Transliteration: "bokjesan-eseoman bolsu gongjunggokyeye nun-i hwidunggeurejin sseonijeu" (Korean: 북제산에서만 볼수 있는 공중곡예예 눈이 휘둥그레진 써니즈)	August 2, 2025	TBA
6	"A Tumultuous Final Journey! Sunnyz, I Can't Let You Go Even If I Die..."; Transliteration: "jwachungu-deul majimak yeohaeng! sseonijeu, jukeodo mot bonae..." (Korean: 좌충우돌 마지막 여행! 써니즈, 죽어도 못 보내...)	August 9, 2025	TBA

== Ratings ==
Average TV viewership ratings
Ep.	Original broadcast date	Average audience share (Nielsen Korea)	
Ep.	Original broadcast date	Nationwide	Seoul
1	July 5, 2025	2.3%	2.5%
2	July 12, 2025	1.9%	—
3	July 19, 2025	1.8%	—
4	July 26, 2025	1.5%	—
5	August 2, 2025	1.6%	—
6	August 9, 2025	1,8%	—
Average		1,8%	—
In the table above, the blue numbers represent the lowest ratings and the red numbers represent the highest ratings.
