= Tangle Teezer =

British hair care product company

Tangle Teezer is a British company that manufactures hair care products, most notably hairbrushes. It was founded by Shaun Pulfrey, a hairdresser, and its first product was launched in 2007. The first product, a detangling hairbrush named"The Original" received the Queen's Award for Innovation in 2012, and International Trade in 2014, as well as reaching the Sunday Times Fast Track 100 in 2013 and 2016.

== History ==
Tangle Teezer was founded by its inventor Shaun Pulfrey, who started his career as a hair colorist in 1978. He has worked at Pierre Alexandre, Toni&Guy, Nicky Clarke, and Richard Ward salons throughout his career.

In 2003, Pulfrey began to research and develop his idea for a detangling hairbrush.

In 2005 Pulfrey remortgaged his flat in Brixton, London for six months' worth of capital (£25,000) to finance the product launch.

In May 2005, Pulfrey published I Wanna Be Blonde, a book about hair coloring techniques.

Pulfrey appeared on Dragons’ Den in 2007. He pitched "The Original" detangling hairbrush to Peter Jones, Duncan Bannatyne, James Caan and Deborah Meaden. Pulfrey offered 15% of Tangle Teezer for £80,000 but was rejected. Jones labeled the brushes ‘hair-brained’, Caan said they were a ‘waste of time,’ and Bannatyne said he wanted to ‘pull [his] hair out.’ However, when the episode aired, the Tangle Teezer website crashed due to a high volume of traffic, with 1,500 orders placed.

In 2008, Boots began stocking the brushes, and by 2009 sales had reached £500,000.

In 2011, sales hit £2.2 million, further growing to £28.6 million in March 2016, having expanded into 70 international markets.

In July 2021, Pulfrey sold a majority stake in Tangle Teezer to Mayfair Equity Partners for approximately £70 million.
