= Refresh! =

2025 single by Zhang Hao

Single by Zhang Hao

from the album To the Moon OST Part 3
- Language: Korean; English
- Released: September 26, 2025
- Studio: Tone Studio (Seoul)
- Genre: Dance; disco funk
- Length: 2:38
- Label: Stone Music Entertainment
- Composer: Han Jae-wan
- Lyricists: Han Jae-wan; Sehwa
- Producers: Kim Jeong-ha; Yoon Min-ah; Im Ga-won

Zhang Hao singles chronology
"I Wanna Know" (2024)	"Refresh!" (2025)

Music video
- "Refresh!" on YouTube

"Refresh!" is a song recorded by Chinese singer Zhang Hao, serving as an original soundtrack (OST) for the 2025 South Korean television series To the Moon. The song was released digitally through Stone Music Entertainment on September 26, 2025, as Zhang Hao's second solo original soundtrack.

== Background, release and promotion ==
"Refresh!" was first featured as a snippet at the middle of To the Moon's episode one, aired on September 19, 2025. The track was later confirmed to release on September 26 to digital music and streaming platforms, alongside the accompanying music video which includes scenes from the series and shots of Zhang Hao performing the song in a recording studio.

== Lyrics and composition ==
"Refresh!" is an upbeat song written by Han Jae-wan and Sehwa. The song expresses the bright collaborations of the main characters from the drama To the Moon with brass and funky guitar to incorporate the disco funk style. The song is composed in the key A Major, and is 115 beats per minute with a running time of 2 minutes and 37 seconds.

== Commercial performance ==
Upon its release, "Refresh!" entered Japan's Oricon Daily Digital Singles Chart at number 16. It also entered South Korea's Circle Digital Chart at number 71 issue dated September 21 to 27, Billboard's World Digital Song Sales at number 4, and Billboard Japan's Download Song Chart at number 28. On Circle's component charts, the song landed at number 1 on the Download Chart, and number 97 on the BGM Chart.

== Track listing ==
Digital download and streaming
No.	Title	Length
1.	"Refresh!"	2:37
2.	"Refresh!" (instrumental)	2:37
Total length:		5:14

== Credits and personnel ==
Credits adapted from Melon.

Personnel

- Zhang Hao – lead vocals
- Han Jae-wan – songwriter, composer, arrangement, synth, bass, drum, backing vocals, vocal directing, digital editing
- Sehwa – songwriter
- Yoo Ji-hoon – guitar
- Woo Sung-joon – backing vocals
- Moon Jung-hwan – recording
- UncleJoe – mixing
- Park Joon – mastering
- Kim Jung-ha – producing
- Yoon Min-ah – producing
- Im Ga-won – producing

Location

- TONE Studio Seoul – recording
- JoeLab – mixing
- SoundMAX – mastering
- CJ ENM – producing

== Charts ==
=== Weekly charts ===
Weekly chart performance for "Refresh!"
Chart (2025)	Peak position
South Korea (Circle)	71
US World Digital Song Sales (Billboard)	4

=== Monthly charts ===
Monthly chart performance for "Refresh!"
Chart (2025)	Peak position
South Korea Download Chart (Circle)	11

== Release history ==
Release dates and formats for "Refresh!"
Region	Date	Format	Label	Ref.
Various	September 26, 2025	Digital download; streaming	Stone	
