= To the Moon (TV series) =

2025 South Korean television series

- Promotional poster
- Also known as: Let's Go to the Moon
- Hangul: 달까지 가자
- RR: Dalkkaji gaja
- MR: Talkkaji kaja
- Genre: Workplace; Romantic comedy; Slice of life
- Based on: Let's Go to the Moon by Jang Ryu-jin
- Written by: Na Yoon-chae
- Directed by: Jeong-hoon; Oh Da-young
- Starring: Lee Sun-bin; Ra Mi-ran; Jo Aram; Kim Young-dae
- Music by: muii; Kim Jeong-ha
- Country of origin: South Korea
- Original language: Korean
- No. of episodes: 12

Production
- Running time: 70 minutes
- Production company: Bon Factory

Original release
- Network: MBC TV
- Release: September 19 – October 31, 2025

To the Moon (Korean: 달까지 가자) is a 2025 South Korean romantic comedy television series starring Lee Sun-bin, Ra Mi-ran, Jo Aram, and Kim Young-dae. It was adapted from a novel with the same name written by Jang Ryu-jin. It aired on MBC TV from September 19, to October 31, 2025, every Friday and Saturday at 21:50 (KST).

The series is available for streaming on Viu in selected regions.

== Synopsis ==
The series features three women, who are office workers from poor families, dream of making a fortune in life through coin investment.

== Cast ==
=== Main ===
- Lee Sun-bin as Jung Da-hae

A non-public bond employee of Maronje's public relations marketing team.

- Ra Mi-ran as Kang Eun-sang

A non-public bond employee of the sales team who only tries to make money.

- Jo Aram as Kim Ji-song

A loyal accounting team non-public bond employee.

- Kim Young-dae as Ham Ji-woo / Dr. Ham

Director of the big data TF team.

=== Supporting ===
==== Marron Confectionery Marketing Team ====
- Eum Moon-suk as Go Dae-yeong
- Hong Seung-hee as Jeong Da-hee
- Bin Chan-wook as Kim Tae-soo
- Joo Kwang-hyun as Lee Seung-jae
- Seo Ji-soo as Park Ji-won
- Lee Jae-seong as Yoon Jun-seo

==== Marron Confectionery Accounting Team ====
- Cha Si-won as Song Dae-hyeop
- Ahn Dong-goo as Oh Dong-gyu
- Oh Seung-ah as Jo Soo-jin
- Shin Hee-chul as Yoon Tae-young
- Kim Yeon-kyo as Kim Hye-rin
- Choi Ji-hye as Kim Eun-jin

==== Marron Confectionery Sales Team ====
- Kim Gwang-sik as Cheon Dong-il
- Go Han-min as Kang Sung-tae

=== Others ===
- Kim Mi-kyung as Lee Jeong-im
- Seo Hyun-chul as Jeong Yong-jik
- Lee Sang-jin as Byun Joo-man
- Zhang Hao as Wei Lin
- Ka Soo-yoo as Kim Ji-sang

=== Guest appearances ===
- Kang Tae-oh
- Roh Jeong-eui
- Kang Hye-won
- Jung Eun-ji

== Production ==
=== Development ===
To the Moon was adapted from a South Korean novel 달까지 가자; lit. 'Let's Go to the Moon' by Jang Ryu-jin that was released on April 17, 2021.

On January 8, 2025, MBC announced the list of dramas that will air in 2025 including To the Moon. The drama was directed by Oh Da-young who directed drama Oh My Ladylord in 2021. Director Oh said that this drama highlighted the friendship, solidarity, and struggles of three women from poor families living in this era in the office.

=== Casting ===
In October 2024, Ra Mi-ran, Lee Sun-bin, Kim Young-dae and Jo Aram was reported to receive the casting offers. Ra Mi-ran and Jo Aram was reported to positively review the offer, meanwhile Lee Sun-bin and Kim Young-dae haven't decide anything yet.

=== Filming ===
In May 2025, Kim Young-dae's agency, Outer Universe, stated that Kim was in the middle of filming for To the Moon as Ham Ji-woo.

=== Promotion ===
On June 30, the three actresses started a live broadcast on social media and personally introduced various parts of the filming drama set that served as the main background of To the Moon.

== Original soundtrack ==
=== Part 1 ===
Released on September 19, 2025
No.	Title	Artist	Length
1.	"Alone" (혼자)	Lee Chang-sub	3:54
2.	"Alone" (혼자; Inst.)		3:54
Total length:			7:48

=== Part 2 ===
Released on September 20, 2025
No.	Title	Artist	Length
1.	"To the Moon" (달까지 가자)	Ahn Ye-eun	3:00
2.	"To the Moon" (달까지 가자; Inst.)		3:00
Total length:			6:00

=== Part 3 ===
Released on September 26, 2025
No.	Title	Artist	Length
1.	"Refresh!"	Zhang Hao	2:37
2.	"Refresh!" (Inst.)		2:37
Total length:			5:14

=== Part 4 ===
Released on October 10, 2025
No.	Title	Artist	Length
1.	"Your Smile, My Happiness" (니가 웃는게 좋아)	Doko	3:24
2.	"Break of Dawn" (기다림의 끝)	Yuseol	3:28
3.	"Why why"	Yunjin	2:38
4.	"Your Smile, My Happiness" (기다림의 끝; Inst.)		3:24
5.	"Break of Dawn" (기다림의 끝; Inst.)		3:28
6.	"Why why" (Inst.)		2:38
Total length:			19:02

=== Part 5 ===
Released on October 17, 2025
No.	Title	Artist	Length
1.	"Together" (함께)	Lee Sun-bin, Ra Mi-ran, Jo Aram	3:34
2.	"Together" (함께; Inst.)		3:34
Total length:			7:08

=== Part 6 ===
Released on October 24, 2025
No.	Title	Artist	Length
1.	"alright"	Kim Young-dae, Lee Sun-bin	3:44
2.	"alright" (Inst.)		3:44
Total length:			7:28

=== Ham Ji-woo Special ===
==== Part 1: Shooting Star ====
Released on September 27, 2025
No.	Title	Artist	Length
1.	"Shooting Star" (별똥별)	Kim Young-dae	3:28
2.	"Galilei Galileo" (갈릴레이 갈릴레오)	Kim Young-dae	3:20
3.	"Galilei Galileo" (갈릴레이 갈릴레오; Feat. Oak Tree Kids)	Yun Soyee, Oak Tree Kids	3:21
4.	"Shooting Star" (기다림의 끝; Inst.)		3:28
5.	"Galilei Galileo" (갈릴레이 갈릴레오; Inst.)		3:20
6.	"Galilei Galileo" (갈릴레이 갈릴레오; Feat. Oak Tree Kids; Inst.)		3:21
Total length:			20:19

==== Part 2: Haze ====
Released on October 3, 2025
No.	Title	Artist	Length
1.	"Haze" (아지랑이)	Kim Young-dae	2:58
2.	"Your Songbox" (넌 나의 실로폰)	Kim Young-dae	3:23
3.	"Haze" (아지랑이; Inst.)		2:58
4.	"Your Songbox" (넌 나의 실로폰; Inst.)		3:23
Total length:			12:42

=== Full Edition ===
Released on October 26, 2025
No.	Title	Lyrics	Music	Artist	Length
1.	"To the Moon"	Ahn Ye-eun	Ahn Ye-eun, Moon Jung-uk	Ahn Ye-eun	3:00
2.	"Alone"	Sora	Park Woo-sang (LOGOS), Yoo Ji-hoon	Lee Chang-sub	3:54
3.	"Refresh!"	Han Jae-wan, Sehwa	Han Jae-wan	Zhang Hao	2:37
4.	"Break of Dawn"	Moon Jung-uk, Choi Min-young	Moon Jung-uk, Choi Min-young	Yuseol	3:28
5.	"Your Smile, My Happiness"	Doko	Doko, Sa Seung-ho(Winter City)	Doko	3:24
6.	"Why why"	8hoop, Kim min	8hoop, Kim min	Hwang Yun-jin	2:38
7.	"Together"	Kim Jung-ha	Kim Jung-ha, Moon Jung-uk	Lee Sun-bin, Ra Mi-ran, Jo Aram	3:34
8.	"Shooting Star"	8hoop, Kim min	Kim min, 8hoop	Kim Young-dae	3:28
9.	"Galilei Galileo"	AllThou, Kinsha	AllThou, Young2Beat, Shitoko, Lee Aram	Kim Young-dae	3:20
10.	"Galilei Galileo" (Feat Oak Tree Kids)	AllThou, Kinsha	AllThou, Young2Beat, Shitoko, Lee Aram	Yun Soyee	3:21
11.	"Haze"	Park Woo Sang (LOGOS)	Park Woo Sang (LOGOS), Seo9 (LOGOS)	Kim Young-dae	2:58
12.	"Your Songbox"	Doko	Doko	Kim Young-dae	3:23
13.	"alright"	muii	muii	Kim Young-dae, Lee Sun-bin	3:44
14.	"Title of To the Moon"		Kim Jung-ha, muii	Kim Jung-ha, muii	0:35
15.	"Persona"		muii	muii	1:01
16.	"Green Bottles"		Kim Yu-hyeon	Kim Yu-hyeon	1:49
17.	"Binggle"		Dennis Chang	Dennis Chang	1:38
18.	"One picture"		Mond	Mond	1:25
19.	"No Worry"		Kim Yu-hyeon	Kim Yu-hyeon	1:30
20.	"Wobbly"		Moon Jung-uk	Moon Jung-uk	1:46
21.	"Kedal"		Dennis Chang	Dennis Chang	2:00
22.	"Deal With The Devil"		Moon Jung-uk	Moon Jung-uk	1:28
23.	"I'm The Best"		Dennis Chang	Dennis Chang	1:34
24.	"Cuckoo"		Moon Jung-uk	Moon Jung-uk	1:40
25.	"New Word"		Kim Yu-hyeon	Kim Yu-hyeon	2:19
26.	"Last Moment"		Mond	Mond	1:58
27.	"So Be It"		Kim Yu-hyeon	Kim Yu-hyeon	1:46
28.	"Realized"		Moon Jung-uk	Moon Jung-uk	2:30
29.	"Sweet Habit"		Han Jae-wan	Han Jae-wan	1:28
30.	"Inner Whisper"		Moon Jung-uk	Moon Jung-uk	1:51
31.	"Nice Shot"		Han Jae-wan	Han Jae-wan	1:02
32.	"Goofy"		Moon Jung-uk	Moon Jung-uk	1:32
33.	"Say My Name"		Dennis Chang	Dennis Chang	1:42
34.	"Nitty Gritty"		Mond	Mond	1:15
35.	"Simple Monkey"		Han Jae-wan	Han Jae-wan	1:15
36.	"Lonely Moon"		Han Jae-wan	Han Jae-wan	1:49
37.	"Oh-Ho-Ra"		Moon Jung-uk	Moon Jung-uk	1:29
38.	"Run Run"		Han Jae-wan	Han Jae-wan	1:48
39.	"Flutter"		Moon Jung-uk	Moon Jung-uk	1:21
40.	"Low Virus"		Han Jae-wan	Han Jae-wan	1:30
41.	"Far Moon"		Kim Yu-hyeon	Kim Yu-hyeon	1:59
42.	"Solitude"		muii	muii	2:31
43.	"All by Myself"		muii	muii	1:32
44.	"Stop it"		Mond	Mond	1:32
45.	"My Daughter"		muii	muii	1:44
46.	"JamJam"		Han Jae-wan	Han Jae-wan	1:14
47.	"Whatever"		Kim Yu-hyeon	Kim Yu-hyeon	1:49
48.	"Complete"		Moon Jung-uk	Moon Jung-uk	1:52
Total length:					1:39:13

== Viewership ==
To the Moon : South Korea viewers per episode (thousands)

Season	Episode number											
Season	1	2	3	4	5	6	7	8	9	10	11	12
1	570	N/A	N/A	N/A	N/A	N/A	486	N/A	N/A	N/A	N/A	N/A

Source: Audience measurement performed nationwide by Nielsen Media Research.

Average TV viewership ratings
Ep.	Original broadcast date	Average audience share (Nielsen Korea)	
Ep.	Original broadcast date	Nationwide	Seoul
1	September 19, 2025	2.8% (18th)	2.7% (18th)
2	September 20, 2025	1.7% (31st)	—N/a
3	September 26, 2025	2.1% (21st)	—N/a
4	September 27, 2025	1.2% (39th)	—N/a
5	October 3, 2025	2.0% (27th)	—N/a
6	October 4, 2025	2.1% (27th)	—N/a
7	October 10, 2025	2.5% (18th)	2.7% (16th)
8	October 11, 2025	1.4% (45th)	—N/a
9	October 17, 2025	1.9% (25th)	—N/a
10	October 18, 2025	1.2% (41st)	—N/a
11	October 25, 2025	1.4% (38th)	—N/a
12	October 31, 2025	2.1% (23rd)	2.1% (19th)
Average		1.9%	— (Note: Due to multiple unpublished ratings, the exact average rating is unknown.)
In the table above, the blue numbers represent the lowest ratings and the red numbers represent the highest ratings.
