= Newsis =

South Korean news agency

Newsis News Agency
- Country: Republic of Korea
- First air date: September 6, 2001
- Availability: Global
- Founded: September 2001
- Headquarters: 12 Floor 173 Toegye-ro, Jung-gu, Seoul, South Korea
- Official website: newsis.com
- Language: Korean

Newsis News Agency (Korean: 뉴시스통신사) or Newsis is a privately owned news agency in South Korea. Prior to the launch of Newsis, the Yonhap News Agency was the only news agency in South Korea. It was launched in September 2001. Newsis' news is only available in Korean.

The newspaper had a predecessor, News Syndicate Korea (뉴스신디케이트 코리아) that was founded in 1995. It took a legal battle that lasted several years to receive permission to register as a telecommunications company. Once permission was granted in June 2001, Newsis was founded.
