= Idol Radio =

South Korean radio show

- Running time: 60-100 minutes
- Country of origin: South Korea
- Language: Korean
- Home station: MBC Standard FM
- Original release: Pilot: July 23, 2018 – July 29, 2018; Regular (season 1): October 8, 2018 - September 25, 2020; Regular (season 2): August 9, 2021 - August 25, 2022; Regular (season 3): September 12, 2022 - February 14, 2024; Regular (season 4): February 19, 2024 - present
- Website: https://www.imbc.com/broad/radio/fm/idolradio/index.html

Idol Radio (Korean: 아이돌 라디오) is a South Korean radio show created by MBC Radio specially for idols. It is listenable through MBC Standard FM and currently watchable live through the radio show's YouTube channel, with replays available on the same channel. Formerly they are viewable via Naver V Live, Universe, MBC Radio's official YouTube channel, and online portal BIGC.

== History ==
=== Season 1 ===
Pilot episodes from July 23, 2018, to July 29, 2018, were aired at 00:05 (KST) for weekday shows and at 00:00 (KST) for weekend shows. Starting September 27, 2018, broadcasting started at 21:00 (KST) on V Live for weekdays only, while broadcasts on MBC Standard FM started on October 8, 2018, airing at 00:00 (KST) every day.

Starting April 1, 2019, the broadcast on MBC Standard FM would start at 01:00 (KST) every day, while the show is accessible via V Live at 21:00 (KST) every day.

Beginning May 11, 2020, the broadcast on MBC Standard FM would start at 00:00 (KST) every day.

From May 18, 2020, the new permanent DJs were Got7's Youngjae and Day6's Young K. From August 17, the show only aired on weekdays. Season 1 ended on September 25, 2020, with Season 2 expected to come.

=== Season 2 ===
Idol Radio announced its Planet opening on Universe on July 26, 2021.

Season 2 began from August 9 through Universe, with Monsta X members Joohoney and Hyungwon as the DJs for the season until episode 104. This was followed by casting special DJs for the remainder of the season. The season would also air through MBC Radio every Friday and Saturday at 02:00 (KST).

The last episode for Season 2 on Universe was aired on August 25, 2022.

=== Season 3 ===
Season 3 began on September 12, 2022, with Ateez members Hongjoong and Yunho the DJs for the season until episode 132. Subsequently, special DJs were cast for the remainder of the season. The season ended on February 14, 2024.

=== Season 4 ===
Season 4 began on February 19, 2024, with The Boyz member Sunwoo the DJ for the season.

On January 15, 2025, it was announced that The Boyz member Eric would join Sunwoo as permanent DJ starting from Episode 90, with Eric hosting the Monday shows and Sunwoo hosting the Wednesday shows.

== Airtime ==
Network	Air date	Airtime
Naver V Live	September 27, 2018 - August 2, 2020	Everyday at 21:00 (KST)
YouTube	August 3, 2020 - August 16, 2020	Everyday at 21:00 (KST)
YouTube	August 17, 2020 - September 25, 2020	Mondays to Fridays at 21:00 (KST)
YouTube	February 8, 2023 – June 24, 2026	Mondays and Wednesdays at 21:00 (KST)
YouTube	July 1, 2026 – present	Wednesdays (Note: Occasionally on Mondays or Tuesdays) at 21:00 (KST)
MBC Standard FM 95.9 MHz	October 8, 2018 – March 31, 2019	Everyday at 00:00 - 01:00 (KST)
MBC Standard FM 95.9 MHz	April 1, 2019 - May 10, 2020	Everyday at 01:00 - 02:00 (KST)
MBC Standard FM 95.9 MHz	May 11 - August 16, 2020	Everyday at 00:00 - 01:00 (KST)
MBC Standard FM 95.9 MHz	August 17 - September 25, 2020	Mondays to Fridays at 00:00 - 01:00 (KST)
MBC Standard FM 95.9 MHz	August 13, 2021 – August 27, 2022; September 12, 2022 – November 18, 2023	Fridays and Saturdays at 02:00 - 03:00 (KST)
MBC FM4U 91.9 MHz	November 25, 2023 – present	Saturdays at 00:00 - 02:00 (KST)
Universe	August 9, 2021 – August 25, 2022	Mondays (Note: Occasionally on Tuesdays) and Thursdays at 20:00 (KST)
Universe	September 12, 2022 – February 6, 2023	Mondays and Wednesdays at 21:00 (KST)
BIGC	February 19 – December 16, 2024	Mondays and Wednesdays at 21:00 (KST)

== DJ ==
=== Current ===
==== Season 4 ====
- Sunwoo (The Boyz) (Episode 1-present) (Note: Originally the host of both Monday and Wednesday shows, Sunwoo would only host the Wednesday shows (or the second show of every week) starting Episode 93.)
- Eric (The Boyz) (Episode 90-present) (Note: Eric would only host the Monday shows (or the first show of every week) starting Episode 90.)

=== Former ===
==== Season 1 ====
- Seo Eun-kwang (BtoB) (Episodes 1-6)
- Jung Il-hoon (BtoB) (Episodes 7-363)
- Youngjae (Got7) (Episodes 594-714)
- Young K (Day6) (Episodes 594-714)

==== Season 2 ====
- Joohoney (Monsta X) (Episode 1-104)
- Hyungwon (Monsta X) (Episode 2-104)

==== Season 3 ====
- Hongjoong (Ateez) (Episode 1-132)
- Yunho (Ateez) (Episode 1-132)

== Episodes (Pilot) ==
List of episodes (episode 0.5-6)

Note: The broadcast dates stated were based on the schedule in MBC Standard FM; the remarks section would list down the date of recording if it had been pre-recorded. Usually, on weekdays, the episodes were available to watch or listen live on Naver V Live before the official broadcast on MBC Standard FM.

Episode #	Episode Title	Guest(s)	Broadcast Date	Remark(s)
—N/a		Yook Sung-jae (BtoB); Day6; ONF	July 7, 2018	Launching of Idol Radio (only on broadcast through V Live)
0.5	Gold Axe Silver Axe (금도끼 은도끼)	Golden Child	July 29, 2018	Recorded on July 12, 2018
0.7	IdolLand Night Time Opening (아이돌랜드 야간개장)	Momoland	July 29, 2018	Recorded on July 17, 2018
1	Petition by Fans (덕민청원)	Apink (Park Cho-rong, Yoon Bo-mi); BtoB (Im Hyun-sik, Peniel)	July 23, 2018	
2	We Are The Strongest Idols (우리는 최강 아이돌)	Youngjae (B.A.P); Kwon Hyun-bin	July 24, 2018	Special voice appearance by Ken (VIXX) through phone
3	SummerFriend (여름친구)	GFriend	July 25, 2018	GFriend member Umji is absent
4	Our Midnight is Hotter Than Day (우리의 자정은 낮보다 뜨겁다)	Seventeen	July 26, 2018	Seventeen members Jun and The8 are absent
5	Unexpected Call (뜻밖의 콜)	Gugudan SeMiNa	July 27, 2018	Special voice appearance by JeA (Brown Eyed Girls) through phone
6	A Handsome Kid Beside A Handsome Kid Beside A Handsome Kid (잘생긴 애 옆에 잘생긴 애 옆에 잘생긴 애)	The Boyz	July 28, 2018	Recorded on July 27, 2018

== Episodes (Regular 2018) ==
List of episodes (episode 7-90)

Note: The broadcast dates stated were based on the schedule in MBC Standard FM; the remarks section would list down the date of recording if it had been pre-recorded. Usually, on weekdays, the episodes were available to watch or listen live on Naver V Live before the official broadcast on MBC Standard FM.

Episode #	Episode Title	Guest(s)	Broadcast Date	Remark(s)
7	Sangam World Fireworks Festival (상암세계불꽃축제)	Oh My Girl	October 13, 2018	Recorded on September 27, 2018
8	10 Plus 4 Equals Gwiyomi (10 더하기 4는 귀요미)	Pentagon	October 14, 2018	Recorded on October 4, 2018
9	Welcome! World Wide Idol	iKon	October 8, 2018	
10	Things Are Going As Planned (계획대로 되고 있어)	NoJamBot	October 9, 2018	
11	The Sound of Idol Music	Loona	October 10, 2018	
12	Idol Music Show! King of Coin Singers (아이돌 뮤직쇼! 동전가왕)	Jinho (Pentagon); Inseong (SF9); Rothy	October 11, 2018	Surprise appearance by Sandeul (B1A4)
13	Wild Rose Boys (들장미소년)	Moonbin (Astro); Hwiyoung (SF9); Younghoon (The Boyz)	October 12, 2018	
14	Would You Like Something to Drink? (우주 라이크 섬띵 투 드링크?)	WJSN	October 15, 2018	WJSN members Xuanyi, Cheng Xiao and Meiqi are absent
15	We Will Protect You Snuper (지켜줄게 스누퍼)	Snuper	October 16, 2018	
16	Beautiful Crush	Weki Meki	October 17, 2018	
17	Idol Music Show! King of Coin Singers (아이돌 뮤직쇼! 동전가왕)	Dreamcatcher	October 18, 2018	
18	Popcorn View (팝콘각)	Lee Hong-gi (F.T. Island)	October 19, 2018	
19	—N/a	—N/a	October 20, 2018	Recorded on October 17, 2018, only listenable
20	—N/a	Seo Ji-eum (Lyricist)	October 21, 2018	Recorded on October 17, 2018, only listenable
21	FROMIS9 Post Season (FROMIS9 포스트시즌)	fromis 9	October 22, 2018	
22	MBC×MXM (엠엑스엠엑스엠)	MXM	October 23, 2018	
23	Idol Music Show! King of Coin Singers (아이돌 뮤직쇼! 동전가왕)	Noir	October 24, 2018	
24	Hello It's Me~ How Have You Been Out There~ (여보세요 나야~ 거기 잘 지내니~)	Monsta X	October 25, 2018	Surprise appearance by Sandeul (B1A4)
25	Wild Rose Boys (들장미소년)	Moonbin (Astro); Hwiyoung (SF9); Younghoon (The Boyz)	October 26, 2018	
26	Idol Radio Hot Chart (아이돌라디오 핫차트 '아핫')	—N/a	October 27, 2018	Recorded on October 24, 2018, only listenable
27	Idol Makers (아이돌 메이커스)	Lia Kim (Dancer)	October 28, 2018	Recorded on October 24, 2018, only listenable
28	'Genie' Are You Busy? (바빠'지니'?)	Golden Child	October 29, 2018	Special voice appearance by Roy Kim through phone
29	Sixth Sense (식스센스)	April	October 30, 2018	
30	Hallo! Stray Kids	Stray Kids	October 31, 2018	
31	Triple Prodigies (트리플 신동)	Kim Dong-han; Samuel; Sohee (Elris)	November 1, 2018	Special DJ: Shindong (Super Junior)
32	Wild Rose Boys (들장미소년)	Moonbin (Astro); Hwiyoung (SF9); Younghoon (The Boyz)	November 2, 2018	Recorded on October 31, 2018
33	Idol Radio Hot Chart (아이돌라디오 핫차트 '아핫')	—N/a	November 3, 2018	Recorded on October 31, 2018, only listenable
34	Idol Makers (아이돌 메이커스)	Hong Yoon-jung, Ryu So-ra (Producers of 'Monthly Idol')	November 4, 2018	Recorded on October 31, 2018, only listenable
35	JBJ 95.9	JBJ95	November 5, 2018	
36	How Is It Here? (여기 어떤가요)	Jung Eun-ji (Apink)	November 6, 2018	
37	Idol Music Show! King of Coin Singers (아이돌 뮤직쇼! 동전가왕)	Seunghee (Oh My Girl); Jinho (Pentagon); Joochan (Golden Child)	November 7, 2018	
38	Monthly Jung Il-hoon November Issue (월간 정일훈 11월호)	—N/a	November 8, 2018	Special voice appearances by BtoB except Seo Eun-kwang through phone
39	Wild Rose Boys (들장미소년)	Moonbin (Astro); Hwiyoung (SF9); Hyunjin (Stray Kids)	November 9, 2018	
40	Idol Radio Hot Chart (아이돌라디오 핫차트 '아핫')	—N/a	November 10, 2018	Only listenable
41	Idol Makers (아이돌 메이커스)	Hui (Pentagon)	November 11, 2018	Only listenable
42	Very Cute Little Cuties (뽀뽀뽀-뽀시래기뽀짝뽀짝)	Yoon San-ha (Astro); Yoo Seon-ho; Lee Eui-woong (Hyeongseop X Euiwoong); Seungmin (Stray Kids)	November 12, 2018	
43	Idol Music Show! King of Coin Singers (아이돌 뮤직쇼! 동전가왕)	Jinsol (April); New (The Boyz); Chuu (Loona)	November 13, 2018	Special voice appearance by Jung Seung-hwan through phone
44	Mapo-gu Treasure Box (마포구 보물상자)	Ateez	November 14, 2018	
45	P.P.F.B (Note: Past Present Future always BtoB) (예.지.앞.비)	BtoB	November 15, 2018	
46	Wild Rose Boys (들장미소년)	Moonbin (Astro); Hwiyoung (SF9); Younghoon (The Boyz)	November 16, 2018	Recorded on November 14, 2018
47	Idol Radio Hot Chart (아이돌라디오 핫차트 '아핫')	—N/a	November 17, 2018	Only listenable
48	Idol Makers (아이돌 메이커스)	Seo Yong-bae (Songwriter)	November 18, 2018	Only listenable
49	BtoB Music Show! King of Coin Singers (비투비 뮤직쇼! 동전가왕)	BtoB	November 19, 2018	Recorded on November 15, 2018; BtoB member Seo Eun-kwang is absent
50	Idol Music Show! King of Coin Singers (아이돌 뮤직쇼! 동전가왕)	Baek A-yeon; Yeonjung (WJSN)	November 20, 2018	
51	We're Going to See You Today (오늘 만나러 갑니다)	Seven O'Clock	November 21, 2018	
52	GuguDanjjak (구구단짝)	Gugudan	November 22, 2018	
53	Wild Rose Boys (들장미소년)	Moonbin (Astro); Hwiyoung (SF9); Younghoon (The Boyz)	November 23, 2018	Recorded on November 21, 2018
54	Idol Radio Hot Chart (아이돌라디오 핫차트 '아핫')	—N/a	November 24, 2018	Only listenable
55	Idol Makers (아이돌 메이커스)	Shin Hee-won (MV Director)	November 25, 2018	Only listenable
56	FTTS's Immortal Songs (플투의 명곡)	Fly to the Sky	November 26, 2018	Special guest appearances by Seven O'Clock and Voisper
57	I127 (IDOLRADIO 127)	NCT 127	November 27, 2018	
58	Let's Go! EXID	EXID	November 28, 2018	
59	Idol Music Show! Show Me The Coin (아이돌뮤직쇼! 쇼미더코인)	D-Crunch	November 29, 2018	
60	Weekly BtoB Special! Wild Rose Brothers (주간 비투비 특집! 들장미형제)	Peniel (BtoB); Moonbin, Yoon San-ha (Astro)	November 30, 2018	Recorded on November 28, 2018
61	Idol Radio Hot Chart (아이돌라디오 핫차트 '아핫')	—N/a	December 1, 2018	Only listenable
62	Idol Makers (아이돌 메이커스)	Heo Hang (PD of Show! Music Core)	December 2, 2018	Only listenable
63	What Should We Fill It With (무엇을 채워야 하나)	DreamNote	December 3, 2018	
64	Idol Music Show! King of Coin Singers (아이돌 뮤직쇼! 동전가왕)	Jinho (Pentagon); Inseong (SF9); Joochan (Golden Child)	December 4, 2018	
65	At The Radish Field~ (무 밭에서~)	Mamamoo	December 5, 2018	
66	Weekly BtoB Special: Im Hyun-sik Pick Who Rushed in a Hurry! (주간비투비 특집 급식픽! (급하게 달려온 임현식 Pick!))	Im Hyun-sik (BtoB); Voisper	December 6, 2018	
67	Introducing The Friends of the Wild Roses! ('들.친.소' 들장미의 친구를 소개합니다!)	SF9 (Hwiyoung, Yoo Tae-yang); The Boyz (Younghoon, Juyeon)	December 7, 2018	Recorded on December 5, 2018
68	Idol Radio Hot Chart (아이돌라디오 핫차트 '아핫')	—N/a	December 8, 2018	Only listenable
69	Idol Makers (아이돌 메이커스)	Joker (Music producer)	December 9, 2018	Only listenable
70	Come in and Find Us (찾아오세요)	Lovelyz	December 10, 2018	Lovelyz member Seo Ji-soo is absent
71	Thanks Yubin (Thanks 유빈)	Yubin	December 11, 2018	Special voice appearance by Hyerim through phone
72	Year End Special: <Song the guest> (송년 특집 <송 the guest>)	—N/a	December 12, 2018	Only listenable
73	Big Hit Rose (대박의 장미)	Up10tion	December 13, 2018	
74	Wild Rose Boys (들장미소년)	Moonbin (Astro); Hwiyoung (SF9); Younghoon (The Boyz)	December 14, 2018	Recorded on December 12, 2018
75	Idol Radio Hot Chart (아이돌라디오 핫차트 '아핫')	—N/a	December 15, 2018	Only listenable
76	Idol Makers (아이돌 메이커스)	EDEN (Producer, singer-songwriter)	December 16, 2018	Only listenable
77	Boyz' Generation (소년시대)	The Boyz	December 17, 2018	
78	Where Should We Go Mr Ilhoon (어디로 가야 하죠 일훈씨)	14U	December 18, 2018	
79	Boni Hooni (보니후니)	Hyeongseop X Euiwoong; Dylan (D-Crunch); Rachel (April); Baek Ji-heon (fromis_9)	December 19, 2018	
80	Miracles in December (12월의 기적)	EXO (Suho, Chen)	December 20, 2018	
81	Wild Rose Boys (들장미소년)	Moonbin (Astro); Hwiyoung (SF9); Younghoon (The Boyz)	December 21, 2018	Recorded on December 12, 2018
82	Idol Radio Hot Chart (아이돌라디오 핫차트 '아핫')	—N/a	December 22, 2018	Only listenable
83	Idol Makers (아이돌 메이커스)	Rie (Photographer)	December 23, 2018	Only listenable
84	Yogiyo For This Christmas! (올해 크리스마스는 요기요!)	Lee Chang-sub (BtoB)	December 24, 2018	
85	Christmas Special: Jingle-dol (크리스마스 특집 '징글돌')	—N/a	December 25, 2018	Only listenable
86	Million Dollar Babies (밀리언달러 베이비즈)	Winner	December 26, 2018	
87	Korea-China Special <Idol Radio> (한중 스페셜 <우상전대(偶像电台)>)	NEX7 (Li Quanzhe, Huang Xinchun)	December 27, 2018	
88	Wild Rose Boys (들장미소년)	Moonbin (Astro); Hwiyoung (SF9); Younghoon (The Boyz)	December 28, 2018	Recorded on December 26, 2018
89	Idol Radio Hot Chart Year End Evaluation (아이돌라디오 핫차트 '아핫! 연.말.결.산')	—N/a	December 29, 2018	Only listenable
90	King of Coin Singers BEST! (동전가왕 BEST!)	—N/a	December 30, 2018	Only listenable
—	No broadcast on December 31 due to New Year's Eve			

== Episodes (Jan-Mar 2019) ==
List of episodes (episode 91-180)

Note: The broadcast dates stated were based on the schedule in MBC Standard FM; the remarks section would list down the date of recording if it had been pre-recorded. Usually, on weekdays, the episodes were available to watch or listen live on Naver V Live before the official broadcast on MBC Standard FM.

Episode #	Episode Title	Guest(s)	Broadcast Date	Remark(s)
91	New Year Special: Idol A to Z (BTS) (새해특집 '아이돌 AtoZ' - 방탄소년단 편)	—N/a	January 1, 2019	Only listenable Idol groups stated are not involved in the radio show
92	New Year Special: Idol A to Z (EXO) (새해특집 '아이돌 AtoZ' - EXO 편)	—N/a	January 2, 2019	Only listenable Idol groups stated are not involved in the radio show
93	New Year Special: Idol A to Z (Blackpink) (새해특집 '아이돌 AtoZ' - 블랙핑크 편)	—N/a	January 3, 2019	Only listenable Idol groups stated are not involved in the radio show
94	New Year Special: Idol A to Z (Wanna One) (새해특집 '아이돌 AtoZ' - 워너원 편)	—N/a	January 4, 2019	Only listenable Idol groups stated are not involved in the radio show
95	New Year Special: Idol A to Z (Twice) (새해특집 '아이돌 AtoZ' - 트와이스 편)	—N/a	January 5, 2019	Only listenable Idol groups stated are not involved in the radio show
96	New Year Special: Idol A to Z (BtoB) (새해특집 '아이돌 AtoZ' - 비투비 편)	—N/a	January 6, 2019	Only listenable Idol groups stated are not involved in the radio show
97	I Am My Own Lord Throughout Heaven and Chungha (천상청하 유아독존)	Chungha	January 7, 2019	
98	Kiss The Idol Radio (키스 더 아이돌라디오)	Ryeowook (Super Junior)	January 8, 2019	
99	Ujung Girls (우정소녀)	WJSN	January 9, 2019	WJSN members Xuanyi, Cheng Xiao and Meiqi are absent
100	Idol Radio X ISAC: The Dance in Rhythm (아이돌라디오X아육대:리듬 속의 그 춤을)	JooE (Momoland); Shuhua ((G)I-DLE); ZN (Laboum); Yukyung (Elris)	January 10, 2019	
101	Wild Rose Boys (들장미소년)	Hwiyoung (SF9); Younghoon (The Boyz); Hyunjin (Stray Kids)	January 11, 2019	Recorded on January 9, 2019; Special voice appearance by Chani (SF9) through phone
102	Idol Radio Hot Chart (아이돌라디오 핫차트 '아핫')	—N/a	January 12, 2019	Only listenable
103	Idol Makers (아이돌 메이커스)	Bae Soo-jeong (A&R)	January 13, 2019	Only listenable
104	Identity Is Valkyrie (Discover The Identities) (정체를 Valkyrie(발키리))	Oneus	January 14, 2019	
105	★Celebrate★ Hundred Ilhoon (★경축★ 백일훈)	—N/a	January 15, 2019	
106	I Am A Natural Person (나는 자연인이다)	Nature	January 16, 2019	Special voice appearance by Lee Seung-yoon through phone
107	YATAZONE (야타존)	Lee Min-hyuk (BtoB)	January 17, 2019	
108	Idol Radio X ISAC: 'Run.Run' (아이돌라디오X아육대 '뛰.뛰')	The Boyz (Younghoon, Q); Sunyoul (Up10tion); Y (Golden Child); Hyojin (ONF)	January 18, 2019	Recorded on January 16, 2019
109	Idol Radio Hot Chart (아이돌라디오 핫차트 '아핫')	—N/a	January 19, 2019	Only listenable
110	Idol Makers (아이돌 메이커스)	Jo In-ok (Studio Onsil CEO; Album and goods designer)	January 20, 2019	Only listenable
111	Hyomin, GO (효민, GO)	Hyomin (T-ara)	January 21, 2019	
112	Don't Leave This Man (이 남자를 떠나지마)	Son Ho-young (g.o.d)	January 22, 2019	
113	Isn't This GFriend~ (우리, 여자친구 아이가~)	GFriend	January 23, 2019	GFriend member Yerin left midway due to other schedules
114	Tonight (Message Me) (Tonight(문자해))	Astro	January 24, 2019	
115	Idol Radio X ISAC: Broadcast Shooter! (Don't Miss It!) (아이돌라디오X아육대 본.방.사.수!)	Moonbin (Astro); Jeup (Imfact); E-Tion (ONF); Jibeom (Golden Child)	January 25, 2019	Recorded on January 23, 2019
116	Idol Radio Hot Chart (아이돌라디오 핫차트 '아핫')	—N/a	January 26, 2019	Only listenable
117	Idol Makers (아이돌 메이커스)	Park Kyung (Block B)	January 27, 2019	Only listenable
118	Tall People Are Good (큰 사람이 좋다)	KNK	January 28, 2019	
119	Ask Anything (무엇이든 물어보세요)	Cherry Bullet	January 29, 2019	
120	Comeback Doodoom-CLC (컴백 두둠칯)	CLC	January 30, 2019	
121	I Wanna Know Taehyun (I Wanna Know 태현)	Roh Tae-hyun (Hotshot)	January 31, 2019	
122	Wild Rose Boys (들장미소년)	Younghoon (The Boyz); Hongseok (Pentagon); Hyunjin (Stray Kids)	February 1, 2019	Recorded on January 30, 2019
123	Idol Radio Hot Chart (아이돌라디오 핫차트 '아핫')	—N/a	February 2, 2019	Only listenable
124	Idol Makers (아이돌 메이커스)	Na Jae-hee (Lighting director, formerly of Show! Music Core)	February 3, 2019	Only listenable
125	Lunar New Year Special: King of Coin Singers (설 특집 <동전가왕>)	Jeup (Imfact); SuA (Dreamcatcher); Jongho (Ateez); Seoho (Oneus)	February 4, 2019	
126	Looking For Our Parents' Idols~ (우리 엄마 아빠의 아이돌을 찾아서~)	Jinho (Pentagon)	February 5, 2019	Only listenable
127	SayTEEZ (세이티즈)	Ateez	February 6, 2019	
128	Way Back Home (집으로 가는 길)	Seventeen (Seungkwan, Vernon, Dino)	February 7, 2019	
129	Wild Rose Boys (들장미소년)	Jibeom (Golden Child); Stray Kids (Hyunjin, Lee Know)	February 8, 2019	Recorded on February 6, 2019
130	Idol Radio Hot Chart (아이돌라디오 핫차트 '아핫')	—N/a	February 9, 2019	Only listenable
131	Idol Makers (아이돌 메이커스)	Im Chan (PD of Show! Music Core and 2019 Lunar New Year Idol Star Athletics Championships)	February 10, 2019	Only listenable
132	Idol Radio X Under Nineteen (아이돌라디오 X 언더나인틴)	1the9	February 11, 2019	
133	Day 1 From Today (오늘부터 1일)	ONF	February 12, 2019	
134	PIRI Is Good (Feeling Good) (PIRI 좋다 (FEEL이 좋다))	Dreamcatcher	February 13, 2019	
135	Valentine Boys (발렌타이 보이)	Yoon San-ha (Astro); Yoo Seon-ho	February 14, 2019	
136	Wild Rose Boys (들장미소년)	Moonbin, MJ (Astro); Hwiyoung (SF9); Lee Seung-hyub (N.Flying)	February 15, 2019	Recorded on February 13, 2019
137	Idol Radio Hot Chart (아이돌라디오 핫차트 '아핫')	—N/a	February 16, 2019	Only listenable
138	Idol Makers (아이돌 메이커스)	Hwang Sang-hoon (Performance director)	February 17, 2019	Only listenable
139	Dae Jang Geum Is Listening (대장금이 들고 있다)	Flavor	February 18, 2019	
140	Idol Music Show! King of Coin Singers (아이돌 뮤직쇼! 동전가왕)	Rockhyun (100%); Ji Su-yeon (Weki Meki); Golden Child (Jangjun, Tag)	February 19, 2019	
141	Star Is Born (스타 이즈 본)	TREI	February 20, 2019	
142	A Sumptuous Feast (진수성찬)	Yoon Ji-sung	February 21, 2019	Special voice appearance by Changbin (Stray Kids) through pre-recorded voice message
143	Wild Rose Boys (들장미소년)	Peniel (BtoB); Q (The Boyz); Jibeom (Golden Child)	February 22, 2019	Recorded on February 20, 2019
144	Idol Radio Hot Chart (아이돌라디오 핫차트 '아핫')	—N/a	February 23, 2019	Only listenable
145	Idol Makers (아이돌 메이커스)	Babylon	February 24, 2019	Only listenable
146	Songpa-gu Sangam-dong (송파구 상암동)	SF9	February 25, 2019	
147	Swamp Room (늪방)	Monsta X	February 26, 2019	
148	I-DLE Radio (아이들 라디오)	(G)I-DLE	February 27, 2019	
149	I'll Tell Them It Was Great (오.꼭.말. (오졌다고 꼭 말해줘야지))	Ha Sung-woon	February 28, 2019	
150	Wild Rose Boys (들장미소년)	Younghoon (The Boyz); Jibeom (Golden Child); Yoo Seon-ho	March 1, 2019	Recorded on February 27, 2019
151	Idol Radio Hot Chart (아이돌라디오 핫차트 '아핫')	—N/a	March 2, 2019	Only listenable
152	Idol Makers (아이돌 메이커스)	Lee Kyul (Vocal coach)	March 3, 2019	Only listenable
153	Pit-A-Khun (두쿤두쿤)	Nichkhun (2PM)	March 4, 2019	
154	8979	Hyomin (T-ara); Raina (After School)	March 5, 2019	
155	Please Fly Higher (더 높이 날아가줘)	Loona	March 6, 2019	
156	Infinite~ News! (무한~뉴스!)	Jang Dong-woo (Infinite)	March 7, 2019	
157	Wild Rose Boys (들장미소년)	Moonbin (Astro); Younghoon (The Boyz); Hyunjin (Stray Kids)	March 8, 2019	Recorded on March 6, 2019
158	Idol Radio Hot Chart (아이돌라디오 핫차트 '아핫')	—N/a	March 9, 2019	Only listenable
159	Idol Makers (아이돌 메이커스)	VISHOP (Music video director)	March 10, 2019	Only listenable
160	Wingardium Raviosa (윙 가르다음 라비오우사)	Ravi (VIXX)	March 11, 2019	
161	Idol Music Show! King of Coin Singers (아이돌 뮤직쇼! 동전가왕)	Jinho (Pentagon); A Train To Autumn	March 12, 2019	
162	Today Is WooLin Day (오늘은 우린이날)	Wooseok x Kuanlin	March 13, 2019	
163	Garden in the Night (밤의 가든)	GWSN	March 14, 2019	
164	Wild Rose Boys (들장미소년)	Moonbin (Astro); The Boyz (Younghoon, Eric)	March 15, 2019	Recorded on March 13, 2019
165	Idol Radio Hot Chart (아이돌라디오 핫차트 '아핫')	—N/a	March 16, 2019	Only listenable
166	Idol Makers (아이돌 메이커스)	LE (EXID)	March 17, 2019	Only listenable
167	400%	100%	March 18, 2019	
168	Idol Music Show! King of Coin Singers (아이돌 뮤직쇼! 동전가왕)	Mamamoo	March 19, 2019	Mamamoo member Hwasa is absent
169	Give You The Garden (가든을 줄게)	Bolbbalgan4	March 20, 2019	There is no live recording at 21:00 (KST)
170	Music Special - Idol Playlist (뮤직스페셜-아이돌 플레이리스트)	Im Hyun-sik (BtoB)	March 21, 2019	Only listenable
171	Music Special - Idol Playlist (뮤직스페셜-아이돌 플레이리스트)	Chungha	March 22, 2019	Only listenable
172	Idol Radio Hot Chart (아이돌라디오 핫차트 '아핫')	—N/a	March 23, 2019	Only listenable
173	Idol Makers (아이돌 메이커스)	Choi Hyun-joon (V.O.S) (Composer, producer)	March 24, 2019	Only listenable
174	Sangam Dry Sauna (상암 불가마)	Momoland	March 25, 2019	
175	Be An Idol Sewoon (아이돌하세운)	Jeong Se-woon	March 26, 2019	
176	Ulssu Wednesday~! (얼수~!)	Pentagon	March 27, 2019	
177	MIROH of Love (사랑의 미로)	Stray Kids	March 28, 2019	
178	1+1x1+1=Gwiyomi (1+1x1+1=귀요미)	TXT	March 29, 2019	
179	Idol Radio Hot Chart (아이돌라디오 핫차트 '아핫')	—N/a	March 30, 2019	Only listenable
180	Idol Makers (아이돌 메이커스)	Hwang Hyun (Monotree) (Composer)	March 31, 2019	Only listenable

== Episodes (Apr-Jun 2019) ==
List of episodes (episode 181-271)

Note: The broadcast dates stated were based on the schedule in MBC Standard FM; the remarks section would list down the date of recording if it had been pre-recorded. Usually, on weekdays, the episodes were available to watch or listen live on Naver V Live before the official broadcast on MBC Standard FM.

Episode #	Episode Title	Guest(s)	Broadcast Date	Remark(s)
181	WOOWA Awesome (우와앙ㅋ굴ㅋ)	DIA	April 1, 2019	DIA member Jenny is absent
182	Idol Music Show! King of Coin Singers (아이돌 뮤직쇼! 동전가왕)	Heo Young-saeng (SS501); Rockhyun (100%); Yeonjung (WJSN)	April 2, 2019	
183	White Night (백야)	Everglow	April 3, 2019	
184	Check! KARD (체크! 카드)	KARD	April 4, 2019	
185	Wild Rose Boys (들장미소년)	Younghoon (The Boyz); Kim Dong-han; Jeon Do-yum (1the9)	April 5, 2019	Recorded on April 1, 2019
186	Idol Radio Hot Chart (아이돌라디오 핫차트 '아핫')	—N/a	April 6, 2019	Only listenable
187	Idol Makers (아이돌 메이커스)	Cho Yoon-kyung (Lyricist)	April 7, 2019	Only listenable
188	959595 Show (959595쇼)	JBJ95	April 8, 2019	
189	VIBE From The TEAM (팀에서 나오는 바이브)	1Team	April 9, 2019	
190	HyunUp (Current Job Is) Idol (현업 아이돌)	Jung Dae-hyun; Moon Jong-up	April 10, 2019	
191	Korea-China Special <Idol Radio> (한중 스페셜 <우상전대(偶像电台)>)	NEX7 (Huang Minghao, Bi Wenjun, Ding Zeren, Li Quanzhe, Huang Xinchun)	April 11, 2019	
192	Wild Rose Boys (들장미소년)	Hwiyoung (SF9); Younghoon (The Boyz); Hongseok (Pentagon)	April 12, 2019	Recorded on April 8, 2019
193	Idol Radio Hot Chart (아이돌라디오 핫차트 '아핫')	—N/a	April 13, 2019	Only listenable
194	Idol Makers (아이돌 메이커스)	Cha Hyun-seung (Dancer); Peniel (BtoB)	April 14, 2019	Only listenable
195	Idol Radio 'S.C.S' (Idol Radio 'Short-term Cram School') (아이돌 라디오 '단.속.반' (아이돌 라디오 '단기 속성 특강반'))	1the9	April 15, 2019	
196	Idol Playlist (아이돌 플레이리스트)	Jeong Se-woon	April 16, 2019	Only listenable
197	D&E Are Danger (디앤이가 땡겨 (Danger))	Super Junior-D&E	April 17, 2019	
198	I Am The Radio DJ (라디오 디제이입니다)	—N/a	April 18, 2019	Special DJ: Ha Sung-woon; Special guest appearances by JBJ95; Special voice appearances by Ong Seong-wu and Bae Jin-young through phone
199	Wild Rose Boys (들장미소년)	Hwiyoung (SF9); Younghoon (The Boyz); Hyunjin (Stray Kids)	April 19, 2019	Recorded on April 15, 2019
200	Idol Radio Hot Chart (아이돌라디오 핫차트 '아핫')	—N/a	April 20, 2019	Only listenable
201	Idol Makers (아이돌 메이커스)	Jung Yoon-kyung (Stylist)	April 21, 2019	Only listenable
202	Idol Radio 'S.C.S' (Idol Radio 'Short-term Cram School') (아이돌 라디오 '단.속.반' (아이돌 라디오 '단기 속성 특강반'))	1the9	April 22, 2019	
203	Closeup Mode (접사 모드)	Bvndit	April 23, 2019	
204	Spring Special: Oguogu Idol Radio Oh Ah~ (봄특집 오구오구 아이돌 라디오 오아~)	Pentagon (Jinho, Hui); Astro (Moonbin, MJ)	April 24, 2019	Special celebration of Ilhoon's 200 days on Idol Radio + Spring Special open broadcast Filmed at Yeouido Eland Cruise; Live broadcast started at 19:30 (KST) instead of the normal 21:00 (KST); Radio broadcast on this day 01:00 (KST) will be Idol Playlist - Jung Il-hoon Edition; Radio broadcast of this episode will be on April 26, 2019
205	AmoLoong Fati (아모룽파티)	SuA (Dreamcatcher); Seoho (Oneus); Haeyoon (Cherry Bullet); Kim Jun-tae (TREI)	April 25, 2019	
206	Idol Playlist - Jung Il-hoon Edition (아이돌 플레이리스트 - 정일훈편)	—N/a	April 26, 2019	Only listenable
207	Idol Radio Hot Chart (아이돌라디오 핫차트 '아핫')	—N/a	April 27, 2019	Only listenable
208	Idol Makers (아이돌 메이커스)	Kwon Tae-eun (Music director)	April 28, 2019	Only listenable
209	N.Plugged Live (엔플러그드 라이브)	N.Flying	April 29, 2019	
210	Nice To Meet You, Please Take Care Of Us (만반잘부)	HashTag	April 30, 2019	
211	Okey DONGKI Yo (오키동키요)	Dongkiz	May 1, 2019	
212	Youngjae (Genius) Discovery Team (영재 발굴단)	Yoo Young-jae	May 2, 2019	
213	Very Cute Little Cuties (뽀뽀뽀-뽀시래기뽀짝뽀짝)	Yoon San-ha (Astro); Ahn Hyeong-seop (Hyeongseop X Euiwoong); Yoo Seon-ho; Park Sung-won (1the9)	May 3, 2019	Recorded on April 29, 2019
214	Idol Radio Hot Chart (아이돌라디오 핫차트 '아핫')	—N/a	May 4, 2019	Only listenable
215	Idol Makers (아이돌 메이커스)	Im Ji-hoon (Singer, father of Im Hyun-sik (BtoB)); Im Hyun-sik (BtoB)	May 5, 2019	Only listenable
216	Again Bloom (또 Bloom)	The Boyz	May 6, 2019	
217	The Red Shoes (분홍신)	Stephanie; Kim Dong-han	May 7, 2019	
218	Trot Idols (트로트 아이돌)	J.Seph (KARD); Song Ga-in, Jeong Mi-ae, Hong Ja, Jeong Da-kyung, Kim Na-hee (Miss Trot)	May 8, 2019	
219	1 Garden 1 Eric Nam (1가든 1에릭남)	Eric Nam	May 9, 2019	
220	Wild Rose Boys (들장미소년)	Younghoon (The Boyz); Yan An (Pentagon); Yoon San-ha (Astro)	May 10, 2019	Recorded on May 6, 2019
221	Idol Radio Hot Chart (아이돌라디오 핫차트 '아핫')	—N/a	May 11, 2019	Only listenable
222	Idol Makers (아이돌 메이커스)	MuGungHwa SoNyeo (Photographer)	May 12, 2019	Only listenable
223	Spring Is Woohyun by Chance (우현이, 봄)	Nam Woo-hyun (Infinite)	May 13, 2019	
224	Idol with A Story (사연 있는 아이돌)	Jung Jin-sung (1the9)	May 14, 2019	Special guest appearances by 1the9 (Yoo Yong-ha & Kim Tae-woo)
225	Night Time Self-Studying Session (야간타율학습)	Weki Meki	May 15, 2019	
226	High Kick Through The Garden (가든 뚫고 하이킥)	EXID	May 16, 2019	
227	Wild Rose Boys (들장미소년)	Astro (Moonbin, Yoon San-ha); The Boyz (Younghoon, Q)	May 17, 2019	Recorded on May 13, 2019
228	Idol Radio Hot Chart (아이돌라디오 핫차트 '아핫')	—N/a	May 18, 2019	Only listenable
229	Idol Makers (아이돌 메이커스)	Bae Yoon-jeong (Choreographer)	May 19, 2019	Only listenable
230	Your Song Is (너의 노래는)	Ladies' Code	May 20, 2019	
231	Amazing Foreigners (대단한 외국인)	Minnie ((G)I-DLE); Kenta (JBJ95); Aurora (Nature); Daniel Lindemann	May 21, 2019	
232	People We're Thankful For (고마운 분들)	Oh My Girl	May 22, 2019	
233	6-Star Garden (6성급 가든)	AB6IX	May 23, 2019	
234	Wild Rose Boys (들장미소년)	Hwiyoung (SF9); Yoon San-ha (Astro); Kim Tae-woo (1the9)	May 24, 2019	Recorded on May 20, 2019
235	Idol Radio Hot Chart (아이돌라디오 핫차트 '아핫')	—N/a	May 25, 2019	Only listenable
236	Idol Makers (아이돌 메이커스)	Shin You-me (Vocal trainer for Produce 101 Season 2 and Produce X 101)	May 26, 2019	Only listenable
237	WINterview (윈터뷰)	Winner	May 27, 2019	
238	People of the Same Age Bracket (동년배들)	Lovelyz	May 28, 2019	
239	Produce 10 (프로듀스 10)	Cherry Bullet	May 29, 2019	
240	MEssion Clear (미션 클리어)	CLC	May 30, 2019	
241	Wild Rose Boys (들장미소년)	Yoon San-ha (Astro); Younghoon (The Boyz); Hyunjin (Stray Kids)	May 31, 2019	Recorded on May 27, 2019
242	Idol Radio Hot Chart (아이돌라디오 핫차트 '아핫')	—N/a	June 1, 2019	Only listenable
243	Idol Makers (아이돌 메이커스)	Cheetah	June 2, 2019	Only listenable
244	Idol Music Show! King of Coin Singers (아이돌 뮤직쇼! 동전가왕)	New (The Boyz); Rothy; Lim Ji-min	June 3, 2019	
245	ONE (Want) Us~? (원해요~?)	Oneus	June 4, 2019	
246	Do.You.Understand? (아.시.겠.어.요?)	WJSN	June 5, 2019	WJSN members Xuanyi, Cheng Xiao and Meiqi are absent
247	Clap (빡쑤)	Teen Top	June 6, 2019	
248	Wild Rose Boys (들장미소년)	Hwiyoung (SF9); Younghoon (The Boyz); Yoon San-ha (Astro)	June 7, 2019	Recorded on June 3, 2019
249	Idol Radio Hot Chart (아이돌라디오 핫차트 '아핫')	—N/a	June 8, 2019	Only listenable
250	Idol Makers (아이돌 메이커스)	Lee Seok-hoon (SG Wannabe)	June 9, 2019	Only listenable
251	Idol Playlist Special (아이돌 플레이리스트 특집)	Hyunjin (Stray Kids)	June 10, 2019	Only listenable
252	Idol Playlist Special (아이돌 플레이리스트 특집)	Moonbin (Astro)	June 11, 2019	Only listenable
253	Idol Playlist Special (아이돌 플레이리스트 특집)	Younghoon, Hyunjae (The Boyz)	June 12, 2019	Only listenable
254	Idol Playlist Special (아이돌 플레이리스트 특집)	Hwiyoung (SF9)	June 13, 2019	Only listenable
255	Idol Playlist Special (아이돌 플레이리스트 특집)	GFriend (Eunha, Umji)	June 14, 2019	Only listenable
256	Idol Playlist Special (아이돌 플레이리스트 특집)	Kenta (JBJ95)	June 15, 2019	Only listenable
257	Idol Playlist Special (아이돌 플레이리스트 특집)	Park Cho-rong (Apink)	June 16, 2019	Only listenable
258	I'm Somi, 19 Years Old (난 소미쓰 19살인디)	Jeon Somi	June 17, 2019	
259	Ah Really? (아 정말요?)	SF9	June 18, 2019	
260	Fun Fun Radio (펀펀라디오)	fromis 9	June 19, 2019	
261	Write A Poem (시를 쓰시오)	Stray Kids	June 20, 2019	
262	Black Rose Girls (흑장미소녀)	Younghoon (The Boyz); Dayoung (WJSN); Yeeun (CLC); Stephanie	June 21, 2019	Recorded on June 17, 2019
263	Idol Radio Hot Chart (아이돌라디오 핫차트 '아핫')	—N/a	June 22, 2019	Only listenable
264	Idol Makers (아이돌 메이커스)	HIGHQUALITYFISH (Music video director)	June 23, 2019	Only listenable
265	Big Wave	Ateez	June 24, 2019	
266	Idol Blue-White Match (아이돌 청백전)	Noir; D-Crunch	June 25, 2019	
267	Invincible Chungha (청하불패)	Chungha	June 26, 2019	
268	ReVel Grand Park (레벨대공원)	Red Velvet	June 27, 2019	
269	Wild Rose Boys (들장미소년)	Younghoon (The Boyz); Hyunjin (Stray Kids); Chani (SF9)	June 28, 2019	Recorded on June 24, 2019
270	Idol Radio Hot Chart (아이돌라디오 핫차트 '아핫')	—N/a	June 29, 2019	Only listenable
271	Idol Makers (아이돌 메이커스)	Ryan S. Jhun	June 30, 2019	Only listenable

== Episodes (Jul-Sep 2019) ==
List of episodes (episode 272-363)

Note: The broadcast dates stated were based on the schedule in MBC Standard FM; the remarks section would list down the date of recording if it had been pre-recorded. Usually, on weekdays, the episodes were available to watch or listen live on Naver V Live before the official broadcast on MBC Standard FM.

Episode #	Episode Title	Guest(s)	Broadcast Date	Remark(s)
272	Our I-DLE (우리 아이들)	(G)I-DLE	July 1, 2019	
273	Vocal Cords Magic (성대 매직)	Yesung (Super Junior)	July 2, 2019	
274	Idol Music Show! King of Coin Singers (아이돌 뮤직쇼! 동전가왕)	Inseong (SF9); Yeonjung (WJSN); Park Ji-min (15&)	July 3, 2019	
275	Amazing Thursday (놀라운 목요일)	Heo Young-saeng (SS501); JeA (Brown Eyed Girls)	July 4, 2019	
276	Wild Rose Boys (들장미소년)	Lee Sung-jong (Infinite); Lee Seung-hyub (N.Flying); Kim Dong-han	July 5, 2019	Recorded on July 1, 2019
277	Idol Radio Hot Chart (아이돌라디오 핫차트 '아핫')	—N/a	July 6, 2019	Only listenable
278	Idol Makers (아이돌 메이커스)	Ham Kyung-sik (Make-up artist)	July 7, 2019	Only listenable
279	Idol Only (아이돌온리)	OnlyOneOf	July 8, 2019	
280	7979	—N/a	July 9, 2019	
281	Wednesday Night Fever	GFriend	July 10, 2019	
282	K-Pop Blue Chip (가요계 블루칩)	Ha Sung-woon (Hotshot)	July 11, 2019	
283	White Clover Boys (토끼풀소년)	Kenta (JBJ95); Dylan (D-Crunch); Hwanwoong (Oneus); Jaechan (Dongkiz)	July 12, 2019	Recorded on July 8, 2019
284	Idol Radio Hot Chart (아이돌라디오 핫차트 '아핫')	—N/a	July 13, 2019	Only listenable
285	Idol Makers (아이돌 메이커스)	Hong Sung-woo (Public performance director)	July 14, 2019	Only listenable
286	Healing Camp (힐링캠프)	Nature	July 15, 2019	
287	Pretty 95 (예쁘구오)	Yook Sung-jae (BtoB); Kwangmin	July 16, 2019	Special voice appearance by Ricky (Teen Top) through phone
288	Idol Music Show! King of Coin Singers (아이돌 뮤직쇼! 동전가왕)	MJ (Astro); Park Ji-min (15&); Yeonjung (WJSN)	July 17, 2019	
289	Approach Right Now (지금근접)	Pentagon	July 18, 2019	
290	Wild Rose Boys (들장미소년)	Hwiyoung (SF9); Kim Dong-han; Kim Jun-seo (1the9)	July 19, 2019	Recorded on July 15, 2019
291	Idol Radio Hot Chart (아이돌라디오 핫차트 '아핫')	—N/a	July 20, 2019	Only listenable
292	Idol Makers (아이돌 메이커스)	Han Eun-young (Stage director)	July 21, 2019	Only listenable
293	Tall Sweethearts (큰자기들)	KNK	July 22, 2019	
294	At The Line of Life and Death (사활을 걸고)	VAV	July 23, 2019	
295	Believe And Listen To DAY (믿듣데이)	Day6	July 24, 2019	
296	Norazo And People Who Can Play (노라조라노라조)	Norazo; Astro (MJ, Jinjin); KARD (BM, J.Seph); Weki Meki (Ji Su-yeon, Elly)	July 25, 2019	
297	Wild Rose Boys (들장미소년)	Kim Dong-han; JBJ95; Roh Tae-hyun (Hotshot)	July 26, 2019	Recorded on July 22, 2019
298	Idol Radio Hot Chart (아이돌라디오 핫차트 '아핫')	—N/a	July 27, 2019	Only listenable
299	Idol Makers (아이돌 메이커스)	JQ (Lyricist)	July 28, 2019	Only listenable
300	Secret Garden (시크릿 가든)	CIX	July 29, 2019	
301	Strong.DONG.1 (Note: The Strong Dongkiz And 1TEAM) (강.동.원)	1Team; Dongkiz	July 30, 2019	
302	Idol Music Show! King of Coin Singers (아이돌 뮤직쇼! 동전가왕)	Sandeul (B1A4); MJ (Astro); Elkie (CLC)	July 31, 2019	
303	A Midsummer Night's Dream (한여름 밤의 꿈)	GWSN	August 1, 2019	
304	Wild Rose Boys (들장미소년)	Hwiyoung (SF9); Younghoon (The Boyz); Lim Young-min (AB6IX)	August 2, 2019	Recorded on July 29, 2019
305	Idol Radio Hot Chart (아이돌라디오 핫차트 '아핫')	—N/a	August 3, 2019	Only listenable
306	Idol Makers (아이돌 메이커스)	Min Yeon-jae (Lyricist)	August 4, 2019	Only listenable
307	Thanks For The 'Wake Up' ('깨워'줘서 고마워)	D1ce	August 5, 2019	
308	Pentagon Music Show! King of Coin Singers (펜타곤 뮤직쇼! 동전가왕)	Pentagon	August 6, 2019	Special DJs: Pentagon (Hui, Kino); Pentagon member Hongseok is absent
309	Veriety	Verivery	August 7, 2019	
310	Kkungkkungtta (꿍꿍따)	JBJ95	August 8, 2019	
311	Wild Rose Boys (들장미소년)	Hwiyoung (SF9); Younghoon (The Boyz); Kim Tae-woo (1the9)	August 9, 2019	Recorded on August 5, 2019
312	Idol Radio Hot Chart (아이돌라디오 핫차트 '아핫')	—N/a	August 10, 2019	Only listenable
313	Idol Makers (아이돌 메이커스)	Park Woo-sang (Composer)	August 11, 2019	Only listenable
314	Boom Boom with Loongie (룽이와 붐붐)	NCT Dream	August 12, 2019	NCT Dream members Renjun and Haechan are absent
315	Freeze Unfreeze! (얼음 땡!)	Rocket Punch	August 13, 2019	
316	Idol Music Show! King of Coin Singers (아이돌 뮤직쇼! 동전가왕)	MJ (Astro); NC.A; Yeonho (Verivery)	August 14, 2019	
317	Hurray For Official Debut (정식 데뷔 만세)	Fanatics	August 15, 2019	
318	Wild Rose Boys (들장미소년)	Hwiyoung (SF9); Younghoon (The Boyz); Yoon San-ha (Astro)	August 16, 2019	Recorded on August 12, 2019
319	Idol Radio Hot Chart (아이돌라디오 핫차트 '아핫')	—N/a	August 17, 2019	Only listenable
320	Idol Makers (아이돌 메이커스)	Kwon Jae-seung (Choreographer)	August 18, 2019	Only listenable
321	I Like You, Again (널 좋아해, 또)	Kim Jin-woo (Winner)	August 19, 2019	Special voice appearance by Kang Seung-yoon (Winner) through phone
322	Weki Meki Music Show! King of Coin Singers (위키미키 뮤직쇼! 동전가왕)	Weki Meki	August 20, 2019	
323	Confident ITZY (Have Confidence) (자신있지)	Itzy	August 21, 2019	The V Live broadcast started at 20:00 (KST) for this episode
324	This World 10TION (이 세상 텐션)	UP10TION	August 22, 2019	UP10TION members Lee Jin-hyuk and Wooshin are absent
325	Wild Rose Boys (들장미소년)	Hwiyoung (SF9); Younghoon (The Boyz); Hyunsuk (CIX)	August 23, 2019	Recorded on August 19, 2019
326	Idol Radio Hot Chart (아이돌라디오 핫차트 '아핫')	—N/a	August 24, 2019	Only listenable
327	Idol Makers (아이돌 메이커스)	Kiggen	August 25, 2019	Only listenable
328	Idol Music Show! King of Coin Singers (아이돌 뮤직쇼! 동전가왕)	April (Chaekyung, Jinsol); DIA (Jueun, Eunchae); GWSN (Anne, Lena); Bvndit (Yiyeon, Seungeun)	August 26, 2019	
329	Another Oh Ha-young (또 오하영)	Oh Ha-young (Apink)	August 27, 2019	
330	Here Comes A Duo (나와듀오)	Kim Kook-heon; Song Yuvin	August 28, 2019	
331	Sangam Boyz Sports Festival (상암소년체전)	The Boyz	August 29, 2019	The Boyz member Hwall is absent
332	Wild Rose Boys (들장미소년)	Hwiyoung (SF9); Yoon San-ha (Astro); Yoo Yong-ha (1the9)	August 30, 2019	Recorded on August 26, 2019
333	Idol Radio Hot Chart (아이돌라디오 핫차트 '아핫')	—N/a	August 31, 2019	Only listenable
334	Idol Makers (아이돌 메이커스)	Moon Kim (Music producer)	September 1, 2019	Only listenable
335	The Irony Of Fate (Saeong X1-MA) (새옹_지마)	Choi Byung-chan; Lee Se-jin; Yuri	September 2, 2019	
336	Genie (GobBin) (도깨빈)	Kwon Hyun-bin	September 3, 2019	
337	Idol Music Show! King of Coin Singers (아이돌 뮤직쇼! 동전가왕)	WJSN (Dawon, Dayoung); SF9 (Youngbin, Jaeyoon); D1ce (Woo Jin-young, Kim Hyun-soo)	September 4, 2019	
338	X1_It (엑스원_잇)	X1	September 5, 2019	
339	Wild Rose Boys (들장미소년)	Hwiyoung (SF9); Yoon San-ha (Astro); Kim Dong-han	September 6, 2019	Recorded on September 2, 2019
340	Idol Radio Hot Chart (아이돌라디오 핫차트 '아핫')	—N/a	September 7, 2019	Only listenable
341	Idol Makers (아이돌 메이커스)	Kim Eana	September 8, 2019	Only listenable
342	The Devil Wears Black (악마는 블랙을 입는다)	CLC	September 9, 2019	
343	This Edition is the Growth Edition (이번 판은 성장판)	Celeb Five	September 10, 2019	Celeb Five member Ahn Young-mi left midway due to other schedules Special guest appearance by Hyojung (Oh My Girl)
344	RAdios (라디오스)	Everglow	September 11, 2019	Everglow members Mia and Aisha are absent
345	Idol Music Show! King of Coin Singers (아이돌 뮤직쇼! 동전가왕)	MJ (Astro); Lena (GWSN); Mill, Yoojung (OnlyOneOf)	September 12, 2019	
346	Wild Rose Boys (들장미소년)	Hwiyoung (SF9); Younghoon (The Boyz); Yoon San-ha (Astro); Hyunsuk (CIX)	September 13, 2019	Recorded on September 9, 2019
347	Idol Radio Hot Chart (아이돌라디오 핫차트 '아핫')	—N/a	September 14, 2019	Only listenable
348	Idol Makers (아이돌 메이커스)	Seo Yoon (Hair designer)	September 15, 2019	Only listenable
349	Idol Playlist Special (아이돌 플레이리스트 특집)	MJ (Astro)	September 16, 2019	Only listenable
350	Idol Playlist Special (아이돌 플레이리스트 특집)	Yeonjung (WJSN)	September 17, 2019	Only listenable
351	Idol Playlist Special (아이돌 플레이리스트 특집)	New, Q (The Boyz)	September 18, 2019	Only listenable
352	Idol Playlist Special (아이돌 플레이리스트 특집)	Hyojung (Oh My Girl)	September 19, 2019	Only listenable
353	Idol Playlist Special (아이돌 플레이리스트 특집)	Young K (Day6)	September 20, 2019	Only listenable
354	Idol Playlist Special (아이돌 플레이리스트 특집)	Miyeon, Minnie ((G)I-DLE)	September 21, 2019	Only listenable
355	Idol Playlist Special (아이돌 플레이리스트 특집)	Peniel (BtoB)	September 22, 2019	Only listenable
356	Good Night~ (잘자요~)	Dreamcatcher	September 23, 2019	
357	What Planet (Did) You Prepare For Us Today? (오늘 뭐 준비행성?)	Onewe	September 24, 2019	
358	TEEN TEEN Three (틴틴쓰리)	Teen Teen	September 25, 2019	
359	Jung Il-hoon's Night Note (정일훈의 밤쪽지)	—N/a	September 26, 2019	
360	Wild Rose Boys (들장미소년)	Hwiyoung (SF9); Younghoon (The Boyz); Kim Dong-han	September 27, 2019	Recorded on September 23, 2019
361	Idol Radio Hot Chart (아이돌라디오 핫차트 '아핫')	—N/a	September 28, 2019	
362	Idol Makers (아이돌 메이커스)	—N/a	September 29, 2019	Only listenable
363	Our Radio (우리들의 라디오)	Im Hyun-sik, Peniel (BtoB); Hwiyoung (SF9); Younghoon (The Boyz); Sandeul (B1A4)	September 30, 2019	Last episode with Jung Il-hoon as DJ; Special voice appearance by Yook Sung-jae (BtoB) through phone

== Episodes (Oct-Dec 2019) ==
List of episodes (episode 364-455)

Note: The broadcast dates stated were based on the schedule in MBC Standard FM; the remarks section would list down the date of recording if it had been pre-recorded. Usually, on weekdays, the episodes were available to watch or listen live on Naver V Live before the official broadcast on MBC Standard FM.
Note 2: After Jung Il-hoon had stepped down as the show's radio DJ, special DJ(s) would be in for every episode.

Episode #	Episode Title	Guest(s)	Special DJ(s)	Broadcast Date	Remark(s)
364	#IdolRadio (#아이돌라디오)	HashTag	Pentagon (Jinho, Hui)	October 1, 2019	
365	Extraordinary Idol Radio (어쩌다 아이돌 라디오)	Rowoon (SF9); Naeun (April); Kim Hye-yoon; Kim Young-dae	Rowoon (SF9); Naeun (April)	October 2, 2019	Special voice appearance by Chani (SF9) through phone
366	Pentagon Class (펜타곤 클라쓰)	Pentagon	Jinho, Hui (Pentagon)	October 3, 2019	
367	Idol Playlist (아이돌 플레이리스트)	—N/a	Pentagon (Jinho, Hui)	October 4, 2019	Only listenable
368	Idol Radio Hot Chart (아이돌라디오 핫차트 '아핫')	—N/a	Pentagon (Jinho, Hui)	October 5, 2019	Only listenable
369	Idol Playlist (아이돌 플레이리스트)	—N/a	Naeun (April)	October 6, 2019	Only listenable
370	Sewoon Is Here DAY (세운이 왔DAY)	Jeong Se-woon	Pentagon (Jinho, Hui)	October 7, 2019	
371	Time For ONF (온앤오프 캘 무렵)	ONF	Oh My Girl (Hyojung, Seunghee)	October 8, 2019	Surprise appearance by Sandeul (B1A4)
372	God of Thunder, Zico (천둥의 신 지코)	Zico (Block B)	Oh My Girl (Hyojung, Seunghee)	October 9, 2019	
373	SKZ Awards (스키즈 어워즈)	Stray Kids	Stray Kids (Bang Chan, Hyunjin)	October 10, 2019	
374	Wild Rose Boys (들장미소년)	Kim Jae-hyun (N.Flying); Hwanwoong (Oneus)	SF9 (Hwiyoung, Taeyang)	October 11, 2019	Recorded on October 7, 2019
375	Idol Radio Hot Chart (아이돌라디오 핫차트 '아핫')	—N/a	Oh My Girl (Hyojung, Seunghee)	October 12, 2019	Only listenable
376	Idol Playlist (아이돌 플레이리스트)	—N/a	Oh My Girl (Hyojung, Seunghee)	October 13, 2019	Only listenable
377	I Got A Sense of It (감 잡았스)	AB6IX	Oh My Girl (Hyojung, Seunghee)	October 14, 2019	
378	Open Up, Ateez (열려라 에이티즈)	Ateez	AOA (Jimin, Chanmi)	October 15, 2019	Ateez member Mingi is absent
379	Solo DEZ-VOUS (솔로 데부)	Im Hyun-sik (BtoB)	Oh My Girl (Hyojung, Seunghee)	October 16, 2019	
—	Super-dol Returns (슈퍼돌 리턴즈)	Super Junior	Oh My Girl (Hyojung, Seunghee)	—	Broadcast of this episode, originally for October 17, 2019, has been cancelled
380	Idol Music Show! King of Coin Singers (아이돌 뮤직쇼! 동전가왕)	D1ce (Woo Jin-young, Park Woo-dam); Purplebeck (Yeowool, Mini); Jung Dae-hyun	Oh My Girl (Hyojung, Seunghee)	October 17, 2019	
381	Immortal Masterpieces: Paul Kim Is Singing (불후의 띵곡, 폴킴을 노래하다)	Paul Kim; Peakboy; Sunyoul (UP10TION); April (Chaekyung, Jinsol)	Kim Kookheon x Song Yuvin	October 18, 2019	Recorded on October 14, 2019; V Live broadcast of this episode started at 20:00 (KST)
382	Idol Radio Hot Chart (아이돌라디오 핫차트 '아핫')	—N/a	Oh My Girl (Hyojung, Seunghee)	October 19, 2019	Only listenable
383	Idol Playlist (아이돌 플레이리스트)	Peakboy	Oh My Girl (Hyojung, Seunghee)	October 20, 2019	Only listenable
384	ARGON-AIR	Argon	Apink (Park Cho-rong, Oh Ha-young)	October 21, 2019	
385	Oneus Let's Go~ (원어스 가즈아~)	Oneus	Apink (Park Cho-rong, Oh Ha-young)	October 22, 2019	
386	Kei-Pop Youngjae (K-Pop Genius) (케이팝 영재)	Kei (Lovelyz); Yoo Young-jae	Apink (Park Cho-rong, Oh Ha-young)	October 23, 2019	
387	T.S.L.F (Note: Thank You, Sorry, Love You, Forever) (고.미.사.영)	Jang Woo-hyuk (H.O.T.)	AOA (Jimin, Chanmi)	October 24, 2019	
388	Wild Rose Boys (들장미소년)	Q (The Boyz); Hyunsuk (CIX)	Hwiyoung (SF9); Younghoon (The Boyz)	October 25, 2019	Recorded on October 21, 2019
389	Idol Radio Hot Chart (아이돌라디오 핫차트 '아핫')	—N/a	Apink (Park Cho-rong, Oh Ha-young)	October 26, 2019	Only listenable
390	Idol Playlist (아이돌 플레이리스트)	AB6IX	Lee Dae-hwi (AB6IX)	October 27, 2019	Only listenable
391	Please Look After Idol Radio (아.부.해)	Day6	Young K (Day6)	October 28, 2019	
392	SNL (Saturday Night Live)	Saturday	NCT 127 (Johnny, Doyoung)	October 29, 2019	
393	Welcome Halloween (웰컴 할로윈)	1the9	NCT 127 (Johnny, Doyoung)	October 30, 2019	
394	Ready, Action! (레디, 액션!)	Yubin	WJSN (Dayoung, Yeonjung)	October 31, 2019	
395	Real Rabbit Boys (찐토끼소년)	Yoon San-ha (Astro); Hyunsuk (CIX)	NCT 127 (Johnny, Doyoung)	November 1, 2019	Recorded on October 28, 2019
396	Idol Radio Hot Chart (아이돌라디오 핫차트 '아핫')	—N/a	NCT 127 (Johnny, Doyoung)	November 2, 2019	Only listenable
397	Idol Playlist (아이돌 플레이리스트)	Day6	Young K (Day6)	November 3, 2019	Only listenable
398	Boys of Korea	BDC	Lovelyz (Yoo Ji-ae, Ryu Su-jeong)	November 4, 2019	
399	Wild Rose Boys (들장미소년)	Sanggyun (JBJ95); Jeong Se-woon	Hwiyoung (SF9); Younghoon (The Boyz)	November 5, 2019	Recorded on November 4, 2019
400	N.Flying Good Job (엔플라잉 굿잡)	N.Flying	N.Flying (Lee Seung-hyub, Kim Jae-hyun)	November 6, 2019	
401	Do you know Idol Radio? (Do you know 아이돌라디오?)	New Hope Club	N.Flying (Cha Hun, Kim Jae-hyun)	November 7, 2019	
402	Magical Garden (마법의 가든)	TXT	Taehyun (TXT)	November 8, 2019	
403	Idol Radio Hot Chart (아이돌라디오 핫차트 '아핫')	—N/a	Lovelyz (Yoo Ji-ae, Ryu Su-jeong)	November 9, 2019	Only listenable
404	Idol Playlist (아이돌 플레이리스트)	N.Flying	Yoo Hwe-seung (N.Flying)	November 10, 2019	Only listenable
405	Baby Sun (아기태양신)	Lee Jin-hyuk (UP10TION)	Kang Seung-yoon (Winner)	November 11, 2019	
406	VIC Event (VIC 이벤트)	Victon	Kang Seung-yoon (Winner)	November 12, 2019	
407	Fun Is a Dumb (Bonus) (재미는 덤)	Bvndit	Kang Seung-yoon (Winner)	November 13, 2019	
408	Dream of Rainbow (드림 오브 레인보우)	Rainbow	Kang Seung-yoon (Winner)	November 14, 2019	
409	Wild Rose Boys (들장미소년)	Benji (B.I.G); Kim Tae-woo (1the9)	Hwiyoung (SF9); Younghoon (The Boyz)	November 15, 2019	Recorded on November 11, 2019
410	Idol Radio Hot Chart (아이돌라디오 핫차트 '아핫')	—N/a	Kang Seung-yoon (Winner)	November 16, 2019	Only listenable
411	Idol Playlist (아이돌 플레이리스트)	Victon	Victon (Kang Seung-sik, Choi Byung-chan)	November 17, 2019	Only listenable
412	Elris in Idol Land (아이돌 나라의 엘리스)	Elris	Mina (Gugudan)	November 18, 2019	
413	Sangam Dongkiz (상암동키즈)	Dongkiz	Mina (Gugudan)	November 19, 2019	Dongkiz member Kyoungyoon is absent
414	Right Now It's CIX Generation (지금은 CIX세대)	CIX	Mina (Gugudan)	November 20, 2019	
415	Hip Queen (힙퀸)	Mamamoo	Mamamoo (Solar, Moonbyul)	November 21, 2019	
416	Idol Music Show! King of Coin Singers (아이돌 뮤직쇼! 동전가왕)	Seven O'Clock (Taeyoung, Andy); Saturday (Haneul, Yuki); 1Team (Rubin, Jinwoo)	Mina (Gugudan)	November 22, 2019	Recorded on November 18, 2019
417	Idol Radio Hot Chart (아이돌라디오 핫차트 '아핫')	—N/a	Mina (Gugudan)	November 23, 2019	Only listenable
418	Idol Playlist (아이돌 플레이리스트)	CIX	CIX (BX, Bae Jin-young)	November 24, 2019	Only listenable
419	The Adventures of A.C.E (에이스의 모험)	A.C.E	Mina (Gugudan)	November 25, 2019	
420	As You Wish~ (이루리라~)	WJSN	Mina (Gugudan)	November 26, 2019	WJSN members Xuanyi, Cheng Xiao and Meiqi are absent
421	Astro Fatale (별둥파탈)	Astro	Mina (Gugudan)	November 27, 2019	Astro members Cha Eun-woo and Moonbin are absent
422	GolCha Wannabe (골차워너비)	Golden Child	Mina (Gugudan)	November 28, 2019	
423	Idol Music Show! King of Coin Singers (아이돌 뮤직쇼! 동전가왕)	Hwanhee (UP10TION); Hinapia (Eunwoo, Yaebin); K-Tigers Zero (Na Tae-joo, Jung Yoon-ji)	Mina (Gugudan)	November 29, 2019	Recorded on November 25, 2019
424	Idol Radio Hot Chart (아이돌라디오 핫차트 '아핫')	—N/a	Mina (Gugudan)	November 30, 2019	Only listenable
425	Idol Playlist (아이돌 플레이리스트)	Golden Child	Golden Child (Jangjun, Joochan)	December 1, 2019	Only listenable
426	Unlock The Charms (매력잠금해제)	OnlyOneOf	Teen Top (Niel, Ricky)	December 2, 2019	
427	Come See AOA (맴보러와요)	AOA	AOA (Jimin, Seolhyun)	December 3, 2019	Special guest appearances by Epik High
428	Two-Lu-man Show (투루먼쇼)	Luri; Blue.D	Victon (Kang Seung-sik, Choi Byung-chan)	December 4, 2019	
429	I'm A Shining Solo (빛이 나는 솔로)	U-Kwon (Block B); Sungmin (Super Junior)	Victon (Choi Byung-chan, Jung Su-bin)	December 5, 2019	
430	Idol Music Show! King of Coin Singers (아이돌 뮤직쇼! 동전가왕)	UP10TION (Sunyoul, Hwanhee); April (Chaewon, Jinsol)	Teen Top (Niel, Ricky)	December 6, 2019	Recorded on December 2, 2019; Special guest appearances by Rose Finger
—	—	Kang Daniel	Not Announced	—	Broadcast of this episode, originally for December 7, 2019, has been cancelled
431	Idol Radio Hot Chart (아이돌라디오 핫차트 '아핫')	—N/a	Victon (Kang Seung-sik, Choi Byung-chan)	December 7, 2019	Only listenable
432	Idol Playlist (아이돌 플레이리스트)	—N/a	UP10TION (Sunyoul, Hwanhee)	December 8, 2019	Only listenable
433	God Sejeong (갓세정)	Sejeong (Gugudan)	Teen Top (Niel, Ricky)	December 9, 2019	
434	Save~ Jihoon! (지훈이를 저~장!)	Park Ji-hoon	Teen Top (Niel, Ricky)	December 10, 2019	
435	QUEENNAPIA (퀸나피아)	Hinapia	Teen Top (Niel, Ricky)	December 11, 2019	
436	Reasonable Combination (일리 있는 조합)	Lee Jun-young (U-KISS); Lim Ji-min	Teen Top (Niel, Ricky)	December 12, 2019	
437	Unconditionally Minkyu (무조건 민규)	Kim Min-kyu	Teen Top (Niel, Ricky)	December 13, 2019	Recorded on December 9, 2019
438	Idol Radio Hot Chart (아이돌라디오 핫차트 '아핫')	—N/a	Teen Top (Niel, Ricky)	December 14, 2019	Only listenable
439	Idol Playlist (아이돌 플레이리스트)	—N/a	Sejeong (Gugudan)	December 15, 2019	Only listenable
440	YuBaek is the JinRi (Truth) (유백이 진리)	JxR	Jeong Se-woon	December 16, 2019	
441	Wide Finger (Widely Blossomed) (활짝 핑거)	Rose Finger	Jeong Se-woon	December 17, 2019	
442	Wednesday Is Pro Idol (수요일은 프로아이돌)	Kim Jae-hwan	Jeong Se-woon	December 18, 2019	
443	Only JBJ95 (온리젭꿍)	JBJ95	Jeong Se-woon	December 19, 2019	
444	Idol Music Show! King of Coin Singers (아이돌 뮤직쇼! 동전가왕)	Elris (Bella, Sohee); Nature (Sohee, Chaebin)	MJ (Astro); Jeong Se-woon	December 20, 2019	Recorded on December 16, 2019
445	Idol Radio Hot Chart (아이돌라디오 핫차트 '아핫')	—N/a	Jeong Se-woon	December 21, 2019	Only listenable
446	Idol Playlist (아이돌 플레이리스트)	—N/a	JBJ95	December 22, 2019	Only listenable
447	HoooW Warning (호우경보)	HoooW (Note: Sub-unit of g.o.d that consists of Son Ho-young and Kim Tae-woo)	Teen Top (Niel, Ricky)	December 23, 2019	
448	Auspicious Dream of Christmas (크리스마스의 길몽)	Hyeongseop X Euiwoong; BDC	Teen Top (Niel, Ricky)	December 24, 2019	
449	Welcome to NATURE WORLD	Nature	Teen Top (Niel, Ricky)	December 25, 2019	
450	Idol.I.G (아이돌이지)	B.I.G	Teen Top (Niel, Ricky)	December 26, 2019	B.I.G member J-Hoon is absent
451	Idol Dinner Show! King of Coin Singers (아이돌 디너쇼! 동전가왕)	Hyelin (EXID); Shuhua ((G)I-DLE); Keonhee (Oneus); Luri	Teen Top (Niel, Ricky)	December 27, 2019	Recorded on December 23, 2019
452	Idol Radio Hot Chart (아이돌라디오 핫차트 '아핫')	—N/a	Teen Top (Niel, Ricky)	December 28, 2019	Only listenable
453	Idol Playlist (아이돌 플레이리스트)	—N/a	Hyeongseop X Euiwoong	December 29, 2019	Only listenable
454	Wish List	Limitless	Teen Top (Niel, Ricky)	December 30, 2019	
455	Idol Radio 2019 Year End Summary (아이돌라디오 2019 연말정산)	—N/a	Teen Top (Niel, Ricky)	December 31, 2019	Only listenable

== Episodes (Jan-Mar 2020) ==
List of episodes (episode 456-546)

Note: The broadcast dates stated were based on the schedule in MBC Standard FM; the remarks section would list down the date of recording if it had been pre-recorded. Usually, on weekdays, the episodes were available to watch or listen live on Naver V Live before the official broadcast on MBC Standard FM.
Note 2: After Jung Il-hoon had stepped down as the show's radio DJ, special DJ(s) would be in for every episode.

Episode #	Episode Title	Guest(s)	Special DJ(s)	Broadcast Date	Remark(s)
456	Thumbs Up (엄지척)	Momoland	Teen Top (Niel, Ricky)	January 1, 2020	
457	Journey To Atlantis (상상플러스)	Laboum	Teen Top (Niel, Ricky)	January 2, 2020	
458	Idol Music Show! King of Coin Dancers (아이돌 뮤직쇼! 동전춤왕)	Baek Jin (JxR); Yaebin (HINAPIA); Hangyeom (Seven O'Clock); Yoojung (OnlyOneOf)	Teen Top (Niel, Ricky)	January 3, 2020	Recorded on December 30, 2019
459	Idol Radio Hot Chart (아이돌라디오 핫차트 '아핫')	—N/a	Teen Top (Niel, Ricky)	January 4, 2020	Only listenable
460	Idol Playlist (아이돌 플레이리스트)	Momoland	Jane, JooE (Momoland)	January 5, 2020	Only listenable
461	Good Boy (굿보이)	B.O.Y	Lovelyz (Yoo Ji-ae, Ryu Su-jeong)	January 6, 2020	
462	ONF Music Show! King of Random Hat Singers (온앤오프 뮤직쇼! 복소가왕)	ONF	Lovelyz (Yoo Ji-ae, Ryu Su-jeong)	January 7, 2020	
463	Great Men in the Zone (이 구역의 위인들)	We in the Zone	Lovelyz (Ryu Su-jeong, Jeong Ye-in)	January 8, 2020	
464	The Answer is Ateez (정답은 에이티즈)	Ateez	Ateez (Hongjoong, Mingi)	January 9, 2020	
465	Idol Music Show! Show Me The Coin (아이돌 뮤직쇼! 쇼미더코인)	Wyatt (ONF); Hongjoong (Ateez); BX (CIX)	Jimin (AOA)	January 10, 2020	Recorded on January 6, 2020
466	Idol Radio Hot Chart (아이돌라디오 핫차트 '아핫')	—N/a	Lovelyz (Ryu Su-jeong, Jeong Ye-in)	January 11, 2020	Only listenable
467	Idol Playlist (아이돌 플레이리스트)	EDEN	Ateez (Hongjoong, Mingi)	January 12, 2020	Only listenable
468	Verivery Good (베리베리굿)	Verivery	Verivery (Gyehyeon, Kangmin)	January 13, 2020	Verivery member Minchan is absent
469	Cheeky Go Go (발칙하게 고고)	ENOi	SF9 (Inseong, Hwiyoung)	January 14, 2020	
470	Ateez Music Show! King of Random Hat Singers (에이티즈 뮤직쇼! 복소가왕)	Ateez	Ateez (Hongjoong, Jongho)	January 15, 2020	
471	Dream's Page (꿈의 페이지)	DreamNote	Ateez (Hongjoong, Yunho)	January 16, 2020	
472	Idol Music Show! King of Coin Singers (아이돌 뮤직쇼! 동전가왕)	ONF (Hyojin, E-Tion); Oneus (Seoho, Keonhee)	Ateez (San, Wooyoung)	January 17, 2020	Recorded on January 13, 2020
473	Idol Radio Hot Chart (아이돌라디오 핫차트 '아핫')	—N/a	Ateez (Seonghwa, Yeosang)	January 18, 2020	Only listenable
474	Idol Playlist (아이돌 플레이리스트)	Verivery	Verivery (Dongheon, Kangmin)	January 19, 2020	Only listenable
475	CIX Music Show! King of Random Hat Singers (CIX 뮤직쇼! 복소가왕)	CIX	CIX (BX, Bae Jin-young)	January 20, 2020	
476	Good9 (굿나인)	SF9	SF9 (Rowoon, Chani)	January 21, 2020	
477	Chorus of Angels (천사들의 합창)	ANS	CIX (BX, Seunghun)	January 22, 2020	
478	Idol Music Show! King of Coin Singers (아이돌 뮤직쇼! 동전가왕)	Kim Dong-han; Jang Dae-hyeon; Laboum (Soyeon, Haein); GWSN (Anne, Lena)	CIX (BX, Bae Jin-young)	January 23, 2020	Recorded on January 20, 2020
479	Lunar New Year Special 'Rat Songs For Lunar New Year' (설특집 '설날엔 이노래쥐')	—N/a	SF9 (Rowoon, Zuho)	January 24, 2020	Only listenable
480	Lunar New Year Special 'Rat Songs For Lunar New Year' (설특집 '설날엔 이노래쥐')	—N/a	Seunghee (Oh My Girl)	January 25, 2020	Only listenable
481	Lunar New Year Special 'Rat Songs For Lunar New Year' (설특집 '설날엔 이노래쥐')	—N/a	Soobin (WJSN)	January 26, 2020	Only listenable
482	Lunar New Year Special 'Rat Songs For Lunar New Year' (설특집 '설날엔 이노래쥐')	—N/a	Chanmi (AOA)	January 27, 2020	Only listenable
483	Rookies' Fighting Spirits (신인들의 두지)	2Z	CLC (Seungyeon, Eunbin)	January 28, 2020	
484	CLC Music Show! King of Random Hat Singers (CLC 뮤직쇼! 복소가왕)	CLC	CLC (Seungyeon, Eunbin)	January 29, 2020	CLC member Elkie is absent
485	Idol Music Show! King of Coin Singers (아이돌 뮤직쇼! 동전가왕)	Oneus; Onewe	Xion (Oneus); Dongmyeong (Onewe)	January 30, 2020	
486	Super-dol Returns (슈퍼돌 리턴즈)	Super Junior (Shindong, Eunhyuk, Donghae, Ryeowook)	AOA (Jimin, Chanmi)	January 31, 2020	
487	Idol Radio Hot Chart (아이돌라디오 핫차트 '아핫')	—N/a	CLC (Seungyeon, Eunbin)	February 1, 2020	Only listenable
488	Idol Playlist (아이돌 플레이리스트)	Ateez	Ateez (San, Mingi)	February 2, 2020	Only listenable
489	Hip Hop Music Show! Show Me The Coin (힙합뮤직쇼! 쇼미더코인)	Mommy Son; Changmo; Rhythm Power	Jimin (AOA)	February 3, 2020	
490	Idol Music Show! King of Coin Singers (아이돌 뮤직쇼! 동전가왕)	Yezi; Siyeon (Dreamcatcher); Blue.D	Oh My Girl (Seunghee, Binnie)	February 4, 2020	
491	Nun Nu Nan Na For The Debut (데뷔해서 눈누난나)	Cignature	Rainbow (Go Woo-ri, Kim Ji-sook)	February 5, 2020	
492	Live or Die by Sechs Kies (젝생젝사)	Sechs Kies	Rainbow (Go Woo-ri, Kim Ji-sook)	February 6, 2020	
493	GF Festival (GF 페스티벌)	GFriend	GFriend (Sowon, Yerin)	February 7, 2020	
494	Idol Radio Hot Chart (아이돌라디오 핫차트 '아핫')	—N/a	Rainbow (Go Woo-ri, Kim Ji-sook)	February 8, 2020	Only listenable
495	Idol Playlist (아이돌 플레이리스트)	SF9 (Inseong, Dawon, Taeyang, Hwiyoung, Chani)	SF9 (Youngbin, Jaeyoon)	February 9, 2020	Only listenable
496	Loona is Here (이달소 왔쏘왔쏘)	Loona	Oh My Girl (Seunghee, Binnie)	February 10, 2020	
497	iKONTACT (아이콘택트)	iKON	iKON (Jinhwan, Donghyuk)	February 11, 2020	
498	C.B.A.C (Note: Cherry Bullet Athletics Championships) (체.육.대)	Cherry Bullet	Oh My Girl (Seunghee, Binnie)	February 12, 2020	
499	Temptation of Wolves (늑대의 유혹)	The Boyz	The Boyz (Younghoon, Hyunjae)	February 13, 2020	
500	Idol Music Show! King of Coin Singers (아이돌 뮤직쇼! 동전가왕)	Block B (Jaehyo, U-Kwon); N.Flying (Kim Jae-hyun, Seo Dong-sung); WJSN (Soobin, Dayoung)	Oh My Girl (Seunghee, Binnie)	February 14, 2020	Recorded on February 10, 2020
501	Idol Radio Hot Chart (아이돌라디오 핫차트 '아핫')	—N/a	Oh My Girl (Seunghee, Binnie)	February 15, 2020	Only listenable
502	Idol Playlist (아이돌 플레이리스트)	Loona (Hyunjin, Go Won, Choerry)	Loona (Yves, Heejin)	February 16, 2020	Only listenable
503	Hidden KARD (히든카드)	KARD	Rainbow (Go Woo-ri, Kim Ji-sook)	February 17, 2020	
504	Handsome & Dandy (핸섬 앤 댄디)	H&D	Rainbow (Go Woo-ri, Kim Ji-sook)	February 18, 2020	
505	Romantic Dr. BeBe (낭만 닥터 베베)	Pentagon	Pentagon (Jinho, Hui)	February 19, 2020	
506	Sangam-dong Fire Punch (상암동 불주먹)	Rocket Punch	Lovelyz (Ryu Su-jeong, Jeong Ye-in)	February 20, 2020	Rocket Punch member Yunkyoung is absent
507	Idol Music Show! King of Coin Dancers (아이돌 뮤직쇼! 동전춤왕)	Nature (Haru, Loha); Bvndit (Simyeong, Seungeun); ANS (Raon, Bian)	Chanmi (AOA)	February 21, 2020	Recorded on February 17, 2020
508	Idol Radio Hot Chart (아이돌라디오 핫차트 '아핫')	—N/a	Rainbow (Go Woo-ri, Kim Ji-sook)	February 22, 2020	Only listenable
509	Idol Playlist (아이돌 플레이리스트)	iKON	iKON (Jinhwan, Donghyuk)	February 23, 2020	Only listenable
510	Sound of Magic (사운드 오브 매직)	D.COY	Day6 (Young K, Wonpil)	February 24, 2020	
511	Dazzling (눈이 부시게)	Weki Meki	Day6 (Young K, Wonpil)	February 25, 2020	
512	The Birth of Superb-dols (짱돌의 탄생)	DKB	Day6 (Young K, Wonpil)	February 26, 2020	
513	Dream of Me~ (내꿈꿔~)	Dreamcatcher	Day6 (Wonpil, Dowoon)	February 27, 2020	Dreamcatcher member Handong is absent
514	Idol Music Show! King of Coin Dancers (아이돌 뮤직쇼! 동전춤왕)	Feeldog; Euijin (Bigflo); Lee Jun-young (U-KISS)	Chanmi (AOA)	February 28, 2020	Recorded on February 27, 2020
515	Idol Radio Hot Chart (아이돌라디오 핫차트 '아핫')	—N/a	Day6 (Young K, Wonpil)	February 29, 2020	Only listenable
516	Idol Playlist (아이돌 플레이리스트)	Pentagon	Pentagon (Jinho, Hui)	March 1, 2020	Only listenable
517	Unite Together To Rise (뭉쳐야 난다)	MCND	iKON (Yunhyeong, Donghyuk)	March 2, 2020	
518	Lucky Seven (럭키세븐)	Elris	iKON (Yunhyeong, Donghyuk)	March 3, 2020	
519	Kids Turning Into Queens (퀸이 된 아이)	3YE	iKON (Yunhyeong, Donghyuk)	March 4, 2020	
520	Sangam-dong Class (상암동 클라쓰)	Kwon Hyun-bin; Yezi	iKON (Yunhyeong, Donghyuk)	March 5, 2020	
521	Idol Music Show! King of Coin Singers (아이돌 뮤직쇼! 동전가왕)	DIA (Yebin, Eunchae); A.C.E (Jun, Donghun); DreamNote (Lara, Miso)	iKON (Yunhyeong, Donghyuk)	March 6, 2020	Recorded on March 2, 2020
522	Idol Radio Hot Chart (아이돌라디오 핫차트 '아핫')	—N/a	iKON (Yunhyeong, Donghyuk)	March 7, 2020	Only listenable
523	Idol Playlist (아이돌 플레이리스트)	—N/a	iKON (Yunhyeong, Donghyuk)	March 8, 2020	Only listenable
524	The Starry Night (별이 빛나는 밤에)	Astro (JinJin, Moonbin, Rocky, Yoon San-ha)	AOA (Jimin, Chanmi)	March 9, 2020	
525	Mr. Idol (Mr. 아이돌)	Lee Yi-kyung; Roh Ji-hoon	Weki Meki (Choi Yoo-jung, Kim Do-yeon)	March 10, 2020	
526	Purple Rain-gers (퍼플레인저)	Purple Rain	Weki Meki (Choi Yoo-jung, Kim Do-yeon)	March 11, 2020	
527	ITZY MIDZY? (Do You Believe in ITZY?) (있지 믿지?)	Itzy	Rainbow (Go Woo-ri, Kim Ji-sook)	March 12, 2020	
528	Idol Music Show! King of Coin Singers (아이돌 뮤직쇼! 동전가왕)	Cherry Bullet (Jiwon, Chaerin); DKB (D1, Junseo, Harry June); Cignature (Sunn, Belle)	AOA (Jimin, Chanmi)	March 13, 2020	Recorded on March 9, 2020
529	Idol Radio Hot Chart (아이돌라디오 핫차트 '아핫')	—N/a	Weki Meki (Choi Yoo-jung, Kim Do-yeon)	March 14, 2020	Only listenable
530	Idol Playlist (아이돌 플레이리스트)	—N/a	Weki Meki (Choi Yoo-jung, Kim Do-yeon)	March 15, 2020	Only listenable
531	Leader Plus Maknae Equals Gwiyomi (리더하기 막내는 귀요미)	DIA (Huihyeon, Eunchae); Momoland (Hyebin, Nancy); ENOi (Laon, Gun)	Kang Seung-yoon (Winner)	March 16, 2020	
532	VIC Feature (빅피처)	Victon	Kang Seung-yoon (Winner)	March 17, 2020	Victon member Choi Byung-chan is absent
533	Dancing Fate (댄싱연분)	J Black; Mmary	Kang Seung-yoon (Winner)	March 18, 2020	
534	Heart Lupin (하트루팡)	Dongkiz	Kang Seung-yoon (Winner)	March 19, 2020	
535	Idol Music Show! Loona Show! (아이돌 뮤직쇼! 이달쇼!)	Loona	Loona (Yves, Heejin)	March 20, 2020	Recorded on March 17, 2020
536	Idol Radio Hot Chart (아이돌라디오 핫차트 '아핫')	—N/a	Kang Seung-yoon (Winner)	March 21, 2020	Only listenable
537	Idol Playlist (아이돌 플레이리스트)	Victon	Victon (Han Seung-woo, Kang Seung-sik)	March 22, 2020	Only listenable Victon member Choi Byung-chan is absent
538	Together Haeyoung (함께 해영)	Son Ho-young (g.o.d); Yang Seung-ho; Hyoeun; Heo Gyu	Kang Seung-yoon (Winner)	March 23, 2020	
539	Dancing Queen (댄싱퀸)	Lia Kim; Minny Park; Tina Boo	Hongjoong, San (Ateez)	March 24, 2020	
540	Widow's Cruse of Charm (매력이 화수분)	Sejeong (Gugudan)	Kang Seung-yoon (Winner)	March 25, 2020	
541	STAY with me	Stray Kids	Kang Seung-yoon (Winner)	March 26, 2020	
542	Idol Music Show! King of Coin Singers! (아이돌 뮤직쇼! 동전가왕!)	Weki Meki	Weki Meki (Choi Yoo-jung, Kim Do-yeon)	March 27, 2020	Recorded on March 26, 2020
543	Idol Radio Hot Chart (아이돌라디오 핫차트 '아핫')	—N/a	Kang Seung-yoon (Winner)	March 28, 2020	Only listenable
544	Idol Playlist (아이돌 플레이리스트)	Stray Kids	Stray Kids (Bang Chan, Han)	March 29, 2020	Only listenable
545	My Love 2U (내 사랑 투유)	Kang Daniel	Kang Seung-yoon (Winner)	March 30, 2020	
546	AB6IX Playlist (슬기로운 예삐생활)	AB6IX	AB6IX (Park Woo-jin, Lee Dae-hwi)	March 31, 2020	

== Episodes (Apr-Jun 2020) ==
List of episodes (episode 547-637)

Note: The broadcast dates stated were based on the schedule in MBC Standard FM; the remarks section would list down the date of recording if it had been pre-recorded. Usually, on weekdays, the episodes were available to watch or listen live on Naver V Live before the official broadcast on MBC Standard FM.
Note 2: After Jung Il-hoon had stepped down as the show's radio DJ, special DJ(s) would be in for every episode until May 17, 2020.
Note 3: Youngjae (Got7) and Young K (Day6) would be the new permanent DJs beginning May 18, 2020.

Episode #	Episode Title	Guest(s)	Special DJ(s)	Broadcast Date	Remark(s)
547	The Girls Who Cried Wolf (양치기 소녀들)	Favorite	AB6IX (Park Woo-jin, Lee Dae-hwi)	April 1, 2020	
548	Let's Go Easy (쉽게 가자)	Oneus	Oneus (Leedo, Keonhee)	April 2, 2020	
549	Idol Music Show! King of Coin Singers! (아이돌 뮤직쇼! 동전가왕!)	Dreamcatcher	Dreamcatcher (Sua, Siyeon)	April 3, 2020	Recorded on April 1, 2020; Dreamcatcher member Handong is absent
550	Idol Radio Hot Chart (아이돌라디오 핫차트 '아핫')	—N/a	AB6IX (Park Woo-jin, Lee Dae-hwi)	April 4, 2020	Only listenable
551	Idol Playlist (아이돌 플레이리스트)	AB6IX	AB6IX (Jeon Woong, Kim Dong-hyun)	April 5, 2020	Only listenable
552	It's Show Time	Spectrum	AB6IX (Kim Dong-hyun, Lee Dae-hwi)	April 6, 2020	
553	Happy Brand New Day (해피 브랜뉴데이)	Gree; Kanto; Yenjamin	AB6IX (Kim Dong-hyun, Lee Dae-hwi)	April 7, 2020	
554	Come Here OO (이리오오)	TOO	AB6IX (Lim Young-min, Park Woo-jin)	April 8, 2020	
555	ASSArabia (아싸라비아)	Cignature	AB6IX (Lim Young-min, Park Woo-jin)	April 9, 2020	
556	Idol Music Show! ANS Night Show (아이돌 뮤직쇼! ANS Night Show)	ANS	AB6IX (Lim Young-min, Park Woo-jin)	April 10, 2020	Recorded on April 8, 2020
557	Idol Radio Hot Chart (아이돌라디오 핫차트 '아핫')	—N/a	AB6IX (Lim Young-min, Park Woo-jin)	April 11, 2020	Only listenable
558	Idol Playlist (아이돌 플레이리스트)	Gree; Kanto; Yenjamin	AB6IX (Kim Dong-hyun, Lee Dae-hwi)	April 12, 2020	Only listenable
559	Remember The Members (이멤버 리멤버)	—N/a	Winner (Song Min-ho, Kang Seung-yoon)	April 13, 2020	
560	Good at Everything (다 잘하기)	K-Tigers Zero	WJSN (Exy, Soobin)	April 14, 2020	
561	Idol Playlist (아이돌 플레이리스트)	—N/a	Winner (Song Min-ho, Kang Seung-yoon)	April 15, 2020	Only listenable
562	Trump KARD (비장의 카드)	KARD	J.Seph (KARD)	April 16, 2020	
563	Idol Music Show! King of Cosmic Singers (아이돌 뮤직쇼! 우주 가왕)	WJSN (Seola, Eunseo, Yeoreum, Dayoung)	WJSN (Exy, Soobin)	April 17, 2020	Recorded on April 14, 2020
564	Idol Radio Hot Chart (아이돌라디오 핫차트 '아핫')	—N/a	Victon (Han Seung-woo, Jung Su-bin)	April 18, 2020	Only listenable
565	Idol Playlist (아이돌 플레이리스트)	—N/a	Victon (Han Seung-woo, Jung Su-bin)	April 19, 2020	Only listenable
566	Kind Girls (친절한 소녀들)	Girlkind	SF9 (Inseong, Youngbin)	April 20, 2020	
567	Apink's Only Pandas (핑순이만 판다)	Apink	Apink (Park Cho-rong, Yoon Bo-mi)	April 21, 2020	
568	Cravity Debut Party (크래비티 데뷔파티)	Cravity	WJSN (Exy, Soobin)	April 22, 2020	
569	Charms Over The Limit (매력이 한도초과)	H&D	SF9 (Inseong, Jaeyoon)	April 23, 2020	
570	Idol Music Show! King of Coin Singers (아이돌 뮤직쇼! 동전가왕)	DKB	SF9 (Inseong, Jaeyoon)	April 24, 2020	Recorded on April 23, 2020
571	Idol Radio Hot Chart (아이돌라디오 핫차트 '아핫')	Got7	Got7 (JB, Yugyeom)	April 25, 2020	Only listenable Broadcasts started at 20:00 (KST)
572	Idol Playlist (아이돌 플레이리스트)	Got7	Got7 (JB, Youngjae)	April 26, 2020	Only listenable Broadcasts started at 20:00 (KST)
573	Genre is Noir (장르는 노와르)	Noir	WJSN (Exy, Soobin)	April 27, 2020	
574	Oh My Got7 (오마이갓세븐)	Got7	Got7 (JB, Youngjae)	April 28, 2020	
575	LALA Land (라라랜드)	April	April (Naeun, Jinsol)	April 29, 2020	
576	Idol Playlist (아이돌 플레이리스트)	Cravity	Cravity (Hyeongjun, Seongmin)	April 30, 2020	Only listenable
577	Idol Music Show! King of Coin Singers (아이돌 뮤직쇼! 동전가왕)	Hinapia	WJSN (Exy, Soobin)	May 1, 2020	Recorded on April 27, 2020
578	Idol Radio Hot Chart (아이돌라디오 핫차트 '아핫')	—N/a	April (Chaewon, Yena)	May 2, 2020	Only listenable
579	Idol Playlist (아이돌 플레이리스트)	—N/a	H&D	May 3, 2020	Only listenable
580	Fantastic Girl (판타스틱 걸)	Fanatics	Chanmi (AOA)	May 4, 2020	
581	We've Done Great! (우리들은 잘한다!)	A.C.E; Dongkiz	Chan (A.C.E); Jonghyeong (Dongkiz)	May 5, 2020	
582	Destroy The Garden (가든 뿌셔)	GWSN	Youngjae (Got7); Young K (Day6)	May 6, 2020	
583	Found Them! Human Vitamins (찾았다! 인간 비타민)	Oh My Girl	Oh My Girl (Seunghee, Binnie)	May 7, 2020	
584	Trot Music Show! King of Coin Singers (트로트 뮤직쇼! 동전가왕)	Song Ga-in; Jeong Mi-ae; Hong Ja; Jung Da-kyung; Sook Haeng; Kim So-yoo	Cho Seung-hee	May 8, 2020	Recorded on May 4, 2020
585	Idol Radio Hot Chart (아이돌라디오 핫차트 '아핫')	—N/a	Youngjae (Got7); Young K (Day6)	May 9, 2020	Only listenable
586	Idol Playlist (아이돌 플레이리스트)	—N/a	Youngjae (Got7); Young K (Day6)	May 10, 2020	Only listenable
587	Omniscient Solo View (전지적솔로시점)	Dalsooobin; Ha Jin; Natty	WJSN (Exy, Soobin)	May 11, 2020	
588	Ridin' Towards Dream (드림을 향해 Ridin')	NCT Dream	WJSN (Exy, Soobin)	May 12, 2020	
589	Yo~ DJ 'Hype' This Party (요~디제이'흥'디스파뤼)	Hyoyeon (Girls' Generation); Raiden; DJ Pumkin; DJ Wegun	WJSN (Exy, Soobin)	May 13, 2020	
590	Wow! It's 'woo!ah!'! (우와! '우아!'다!)	woo!ah!	WJSN (Exy, Soobin)	May 14, 2020	
591	Elris Music Show! King of Coin Singers (엘리스 뮤직쇼! 동전가왕)	Elris	WJSN (Exy, Soobin)	May 15, 2020	Recorded on May 14, 2020
592	Idol Radio Hot Chart (아이돌라디오 핫차트 '아핫')	—N/a	WJSN (Exy, Soobin)	May 16, 2020	Only listenable
593	Idol Playlist (아이돌 플레이리스트)	—N/a	WJSN (Exy, Soobin)	May 17, 2020	Only listenable

Episode #	Episode Title	Guest(s)	Broadcast Date	Remark(s)
594	Please Take Care of Our DJs (DJ를 부탁해)	Got7 (Jinyoung, BamBam); Day6 (Wonpil, Dowoon)	May 18, 2020	First episode with Youngjae (Got7) and Young K (Day6) as permanent DJs
595	The World of the Bands (밴드의 세계)	Lucy	May 19, 2020	
596	Law of the Jungle (정글의 법칙)	Bvndit	May 20, 2020	
597	Idol Singer-songwriters (아이돌 싱어송라이터)	Ahn Ji-young (Bolbbalgan4); Ryu Su-jeong (Lovelyz); Jeong Se-woon	May 21, 2020	
598	Oh! My OnlyOne (오! 나의 온리원)	OnlyOneOf	May 22, 2020	Recorded on May 20, 2020
599	Idol Radio Hot Chart (아이돌라디오 핫차트 '아핫')	—N/a	May 23, 2020	Only listenable
600	Idol Playlist (아이돌 플레이리스트)	Ahn Ji-young (Bolbbalgan4); Ryu Su-jeong (Lovelyz); Jeong Se-woon	May 24, 2020	Only listenable
601	Secret Who Dis? (시크릿 Who Dis?)	Secret Number	May 25, 2020	
602	Come Out Golden Child~! (금둥이 나와라 뚝딱~!)	Golden Child (Y, Jangjun, Seungmin, Joochan)	May 26, 2020	
603	Crunch My Heart (내 심장 크런치)	D-Crunch	May 27, 2020	
604	The Night with the Red Moon (붉은달이 뜨는 밤)	Kim Woo-seok (UP10TION)	May 28, 2020	
605	Girls Be Ambitious! (걸스 비 엠비셔스!)	Yubin; Minzy; Stella Jang	May 29, 2020	Recorded on May 26, 2020
606	Idol Radio Hot Chart (아이돌라디오 핫차트 '아핫')	—N/a	May 30, 2020	Only listenable
607	Idol Playlist (아이돌 플레이리스트)	Kim Woo-seok (UP10TION)	May 31, 2020	Only listenable
608	Onewe is Here~♬ (원위가 왔어요~♬)	Onewe	June 1, 2020	
609	Still DKB (오늘도 여전히 DKB)	DKB	June 2, 2020	
610	2Z! Over.Flowing.Fighting.Spirit. (2Z! 투.지.넘.침.)	2Z	June 3, 2020	
611	Montasia Island (몬타지아 아일랜드)	Monsta X	June 4, 2020	
612	Colorfull Square	Redsquare	June 5, 2020	Recorded on June 1, 2020
613	Idol Radio Hot Chart (아이돌라디오 핫차트 '아핫')	—N/a	June 6, 2020	Only listenable
614	Idol Playlist (아이돌 플레이리스트)	Golden Child (Y, Jangjun, Seungmin, Joochan)	June 7, 2020	Only listenable
615	Mayday x2! Victon Please Save Me... (메이데이x2! 빅톤 살려주시술...)	Victon	June 8, 2020	
616	Dance With The Solutions (솔루션스와 함께 춤을)	The Solutions	June 9, 2020	
617	Sing For Us Duos~ (노래해 듀오~)	Keembo; B.O.Y; H&D	June 10, 2020	
618	Hug U... with Fancy Lighting♥ (화려한 조명으로... 감싸줄게요♥)	DIA	June 11, 2020	DIA members Chaeyeon and Somyi are absent
619	HashTag Work# (해시태그 워크#)	HashTag	June 12, 2020	Recorded on June 10, 2020
620	Idol Radio Hot Chart (아이돌라디오 핫차트 '아핫')	—N/a	June 13, 2020	Only listenable
621	Waiting For Young~♥ (기달영~♥)	—N/a	June 14, 2020	Only listenable
622	Oh Really? It's N.Flying? (아 진짜요? 엔플라잉이요?)	N.Flying	June 15, 2020	
623	We Are~ 9 Days Into Our Debut! (우리는~ 데뷔 9일차예요!)	Super Junior-K.R.Y.	June 16, 2020	Broadcast started at 20:00 (KST)
624	Fly Towards Space Butterfly (우주로 날아 BUTTERFLY)	Cosmic Girls	June 17, 2020	Cosmic Girls members Xuanyi, Cheng Xiao and Meiqi are absent
625	Hardship (GO Live) End! God's Menu Release! (GO生 끝! 神메뉴 출시!)	Stray Kids	June 18, 2020	
626	Please Show Support For D1CE (디원스 많.관.부)	D1ce	June 19, 2020	Recorded on June 17, 2020
627	Idol Radio Hot Chart (아이돌라디오 핫차트 '아핫')	—N/a	June 20, 2020	Only listenable
628	Idol Playlist (아이돌 플레이리스트)	N.Flying	June 21, 2020	Only listenable
629	Weki Meki Spirit! (윜밐스피릿!)	Weki Meki	June 22, 2020	
630	Idol Music Show! King of Coin Singers (아이돌 뮤직쇼! 동전가왕)	Kim Dong-han, Kim Yo-han, Jang Dae-hyeon, Kang Seok-hwa (OUI Boys)	June 23, 2020	
631	We Did E'Last~ (엘라스트 했어요~)	E'Last	June 24, 2020	
632	DIVE Above the Clouds (구름위로 DIVE)	Cravity	June 25, 2020	
633	Girls Girls Girls	JeA (Brown Eyed Girls); Baek A-yeon; Nada	June 26, 2020	Recorded on June 22, 2020
634	Idol Playlist (아이돌 플레이리스트)	Kim Dong-han, Kim Yo-han, Jang Dae-hyeon, Kang Seok-hwa (OUI Boys)	June 27, 2020	Only listenable
635	Waiting For Young~♥ (기달영~♥)	—N/a	June 28, 2020	Only listenable
636	Glorious Return (금의환향)	Golden Child	June 29, 2020	
637	We Are Young★	—N/a	June 30, 2020	Special voice appearance by JB (Got7) through phone

== Episodes (Jul-Sep 2020) ==
List of episodes (episode 638-714)

Note: The broadcast dates stated were based on the schedule in MBC Standard FM; the remarks section would list down the date of recording if it had been pre-recorded. Usually, on weekdays, the episodes were available to watch or listen live on Naver V Live before the official broadcast on MBC Standard FM.

Episode #	Episode Title	Guest(s)	Broadcast Date	Remark(s)
638	Mystery Nature (미스터리 네이처)	Nature	July 1, 2020	Nature members Aurora, Loha and Sunshine are absent
639	Love.Me.Harder.Bedlam (파.란.난.장)	Cho Seung-youn; Lee Jin-hyuk (UP10TION)	July 2, 2020	
640	Idol Music Show! King of Coin Dancers (아이돌 뮤직쇼! 동전춤왕)	DreamNote (Youi, Lara); ANS (Raon, Bian) woo!ah! (Nana, Minseo)	July 3, 2020	Recorded on June 29, 2020
641	Idol Radio Hot Chart (아이돌라디오 핫차트 '아핫')	—N/a	July 4, 2020	Only listenable
642	Idol Playlist (아이돌 플레이리스트)	Lee Jin-hyuk (UP10TION)	July 5, 2020	Only listenable
643	Answer.Set.AB6IX (답.정.예삐)	AB6IX	July 6, 2020	
644	Special Weeekly (스페셜 위클리)	Weeekly	July 7, 2020	
645	Open Your Eyes	3YE	July 8, 2020	
646	SF9 Makes Me Dance (셒구가 나를 춤추게 해)	SF9	July 9, 2020	
647	Bad Girl Good Girl	Solji (EXID); Cheetah; Jamie	July 10, 2020	Recorded on July 8, 2020
648	Waiting For Young~♥ (기달영~♥)	—N/a	July 11, 2020	Only listenable
649	Idol Playlist (아이돌 플레이리스트)	Solji (EXID); Jamie	July 12, 2020	Only listenable
650	Here Again, Nice To See You (또왔스 잘왔스)	Oneus	July 13, 2020	
651	Summer Boys White Paper (여름소년백서)	Moon Si-eon; Ha Hyun-sang (Hoppipolla); Dongkiz I:KAN (Note: Sub-unit of Dongkiz that consists of members Munik and Jaechan)	July 14, 2020	
652	Going to Be The Best Girl Group! (꼭 걸그룹 짱이 될 거야!)	CSVC (Note: Special project group that consists of Cheeze, Stella Jang, Lovey and Park Moonchi)	July 15, 2020	
653	TOO Special	TOO	July 16, 2020	
654	Idol Playlist (아이돌 플레이리스트)	AB6IX	July 17, 2020	Only listenable
655	Idol Radio Hot Chart (아이돌라디오 핫차트 '아핫')	—N/a	July 18, 2020	Only listenable
656	Idol Playlist (아이돌 플레이리스트)	CSVC	July 19, 2020	Only listenable
657	1THE-ful-9 (원더풀나인)	1the9	July 20, 2020	
658	Million Volts-dols (백만볼트돌)	Verivery	July 21, 2020	
659	Identified as Talents! (정체는 실력자!)	Voisper; XRO	July 22, 2020	
660	Se- Hi! (세- 하!)	Lee Hi; Jeong Se-woon	July 23, 2020	
661	Chemi Approve? (케미 ㅇㅈ?)	Choi Yoo-jung (Weki Meki); Lee Young-ji	July 24, 2020	Recorded on July 23, 2020
662	Waiting For Young~♥ (기달영~♥)	—N/a	July 25, 2020	Only listenable
663	Idol Playlist (아이돌 플레이리스트)	1the9	July 26, 2020	Only listenable
664	D.COY Inside (디코이 인사이드)	D.COY	July 27, 2020	
665	Dancing King (춤신춤왕)	Kasper; Koosung Jung	July 28, 2020	
666	Waiting for SOMI	Jeon So-mi	July 29, 2020	
667	Paradise in Soul (파라다이스 인 서울)	Eric Nam; Yukika	July 30, 2020	Recorded on July 28, 2020
668	(Hyo)seong(Ji)eun is Honored ((효)성(지)은이 망극)	Jun Hyo-seong; Song Ji-eun	July 31, 2020	Recorded on July 30, 2020; Broadcast started at 22:00 (KST)
669	Idol Radio Hot Chart (아이돌라디오 핫차트 '아핫')	—N/a	August 1, 2020	Only listenable
670	Waiting For Young~♥ (기달영~♥)	—N/a	August 2, 2020	Only listenable
671	Monday to Saturday (먼데이 투 세러데이)	Saturday	August 3, 2020	
672	TrendTEEZ's Generation (대세티즈의 시대)	Ateez	August 4, 2020	
673	Garden Summer Break (가든 썸머 브레이크)	Daybreak	August 5, 2020	
674	April is A+ (에이프릴은 A+임)	April	August 6, 2020	
675	Famous Songs Found By Chance (어쩌가 발견한 명곡)	—N/a	August 7, 2020	Only listenable
676	Idol Radio Hot Chart (아이돌라디오 핫차트 '아핫')	—N/a	August 8, 2020	Only listenable
677	Idol Playlist (아이돌 플레이리스트)	Ateez	August 9, 2020	Only listenable
678	Juicy Explosion (과즙이 팡팡)	Rocket Punch	August 10, 2020	
679	Teyoko! AhHa! (Oh My Summer) (태요코! 아하!)	Koyote	August 11, 2020	
680	Aloha! Cherry Bullet (알로하! 체리블렛)	Cherry Bullet	August 12, 2020	
681	Asteroid B813 (소행성 B813)	ONF	August 13, 2020	
682	Idol Playlist (아이돌 플레이리스트)	Daybreak	August 14, 2020	Only listenable
683	Idol Radio Hot Chart (아이돌라디오 핫차트 '아핫')	—N/a	August 15, 2020	Only listenable
684	Famous Songs Found By Chance (어쩌가 발견한 명곡)	—N/a	August 16, 2020	Only listenable
685	Idol Playlist (아이돌 플레이리스트)	April	August 17, 2020	Only listenable
686	Not Shy Between Us (우리 사이 Not shy)	Itzy	August 18, 2020	
687	Idol Playlist (아이돌 플레이리스트)	Cherry Bullet	August 19, 2020	Only listenable
688	MCND Destroy The Earth! (엠쎈디 지구뿌셔!)	MCND	August 20, 2020	
689	Waiting For Young~♥ (기달영~♥)	—N/a	August 21, 2020	Only listenable
690	Idol Playlist (아이돌 플레이리스트)	Lucy	August 24, 2020	Only listenable
691	Docking to Jaehwan (재환이에게 도킹 중)	Kim Jae-hwan	August 25, 2020	
692	No Us No Life (어스 없이 사나 마나)	Oneus	August 26, 2020	
693	Famous Songs Found By Chance (어쩌가 발견한 명곡)	—N/a	August 27, 2020	Only listenable
694	Idol Radio Hot Chart (아이돌라디오 핫차트 '아핫')	—N/a	August 28, 2020	Only listenable
695	Congratulations! Debut 'KangWonDo' (축! 데뷔 '강원도')	Day6 (Even of Day)	August 31, 2020	
696	Idol Playlist (아이돌 플레이리스트)	MCND	September 1, 2020	Only listenable
697	Idol Playlist (아이돌 플레이리스트)	Kim Jae-hwan	September 2, 2020	Only listenable
698	Come Join Me, All My Friends! (친구들 모여라!)	Lunarsolar	September 3, 2020	
699	Idol Radio Hot Chart (아이돌라디오 핫차트 '아핫')	—N/a	September 4, 2020	Only listenable
700	HE is legend	Jang Woo-hyuk (H.O.T.)	September 7, 2020	
701	Meet at 1 Relationship (1로 만난 사이)	Jamie; YooA (Oh My Girl); Lee Eun-sang	September 8, 2020	
702	Waiting For Young~♥ (기달영~♥)	—N/a	September 9, 2020	Only listenable
703	Idol Playlist (아이돌 플레이리스트)	Oneus	September 10, 2020	Only listenable
704	Famous Songs Found By Chance (어쩌가 발견한 명곡)	—N/a	September 11, 2020	Only listenable
705	Idol Playlist (아이돌 플레이리스트)	Day6 (Even of Day)	September 14, 2020	Only listenable
706	Famous Songs Found By Chance (어쩌가 발견한 명곡)	—N/a	September 15, 2020	Only listenable
707	How to Sanha Without Bin (빈이 없이 어떻게 산하)	Moonbin & Sanha (Astro)	September 16, 2020	
708	Memorise The Spell (주문을 외워 줘)	Lovelyz	September 17, 2020	
709	Idol Playlist (아이돌 플레이리스트)	—N/a	September 18, 2020	Only listenable
710	Idol Playlist (아이돌 플레이리스트)	B.O.Y	September 21, 2020	Only listenable
711	Famous Songs Found By Chance (어쩌가 발견한 명곡)	—N/a	September 22, 2020	Only listenable
712	Waiting For Young~♥ (기달영~♥)	—N/a	September 23, 2020	Only listenable
713	Treasure Number 1 (보물 1호)	Treasure	September 24, 2020	
714	Forever Young	—N/a	September 25, 2020	Final episode of Season 1

== Episodes (Season 2 - 2021) ==
List of episodes (Season 2 episode 1-42)

Note: Ha Sung-woon and Jeong Se-woon temporarily stood in as special DJs from episodes 35 until 43 due to Joohoney and Hyungwon's promotional activities with Monsta X in the United States.

Episode #	Episode Title	Guest(s)	Broadcast Date	Remark(s)
1	Jooheon TenTenTen DJ X Ten Bursting (주헌쿵야 텐텐텐 DJ 엑스텐 터짐)	Monsta X (Minhyuk, Kihyun, I.M)	August 9, 2021	DJ Hyungwon is absent
2	Ra Pam Pam Heartbeat Warning (Ra Pam Pam 심장박동 주의보)	Golden Child	August 12, 2021	
3	Weeekly Holiday	Weeekly	August 16, 2021	Weeekly member Shin Ji-yoon is absent
4	Welcome to TBZ Land (Welcome to 덥즈랜드)	The Boyz (Younghoon, Hyunjae, Kevin, Q, Eric)	August 19, 2021	
5	Summer Was Popping♡ (여름 쏙~이었다♡)	ONF	August 23, 2021	
6	Wave That Comes From The Real~ (찐에서 나오는 WAVE~)	CIX	August 26, 2021	
7	Came, Enjoyed, Laughed (왔노라, 즐겼노라, 빵빵 터졌노라)	Cravity	August 30, 2021	
8	Welcome, Comeback for the First Time? (어서 와, 컴백은 처음이지?)	Mirae	September 2, 2021	
9	After Sweet-night~♡ (애프터 꿀나잇~♡)	Astro (MJ, Jinjin, Yoon San-ha)	September 6, 2021	
10	Remove Sunglasses, Love Filter Installation Complete (색안경 빼고 애정 필터 장착 완료)	STAYC	September 9, 2021	
11	PurKi VS PurKi (퍼키 VS 퍼키)	Purple Kiss	September 13, 2021	Broadcast started at 20:30 (KST)
12	Stanning Number T-1419 (입덕 번호 T-1419)	T1419	September 16, 2021	Changed from original guests MCND due to unforeseen circumstances
13	Romantic Honey Center (사랑의 꿀센터)	WJSN (Soobin, Dayoung); Jeong Se-woon; Cravity (Jungmo, Woobin)	September 20, 2021	
14	OMEGA X-FILE	Omega X	September 23, 2021	
15	Idol Radio Autumn Music Festival (아이돌라디오 가을 음악회)	Lee So-jung; Kim Min-seok (MeloMance); Jeong Se-woon	September 27, 2021	
16	Real Love's Blindness (찐 사랑의 콩깍지)	Ciipher	September 30, 2021	
17	WEi Doljanchi (위아이 돌잔치)	WEi	October 4, 2021	
18	NIK Trespass! NIKNIK Now Let's Go In~ (니크침입! 닠닠 자 들어갑니다~)	NIK	October 7, 2021	
19	WAYB ON THE STAGE	WAYB (no:ze, Dolla, Ansso, Lee Su, Gyuri An)	October 11, 2021	
20	Idol Radio Rock Mint Choco Festival (아돌락 민초 페스티벌)	N.Flying (Cha Hun, Kim Jae-hyun, Seo Dong-sung)	October 14, 2021	
21	I Am SOLO (나는 SOLO)	Cho Seung-youn; Jo Yu-ri	October 18, 2021	Special DJs: Kwon Eun-bi, Lee Jang-jun (Golden Child)
22	Dal-DJ is BACK (달디 is BACK)	Youngjae (Got7)	October 21, 2021	
23	Stanning Fairies Special.zip (입덕 요정 특.zip)	Lola (Pixy); Hyeongshin (Hot Issue); Hyunbin (Tri.be); Yeju (Ichillin')	October 25, 2021	
24	Deep Stanning School Ogu-warts (Deep덕학교 오구와트)	AB6IX	October 28, 2021	
25	Work Work-shop (Work Work샵)	Lee Jin-hyuk (UP10TION)	November 1, 2021	
26	Fire Thursday (불타는 목요일)	Secret Number	November 4, 2021	Secret Number member Denise is absent
27	TBZ's Cells (덥즈의 세포들)	The Boyz (Sangyeon, Hyunjae, Ju Hak-nyeon)	November 8, 2021	
28	Midnight GHOST Talk (심야GHOST회)	DreamNote	November 11, 2021	
29	GguGgu Day (꾸꾸데이)	Han Yo-han	November 15, 2021	
30	Dolha Handsome Boys (돌하미남)	Oneus	November 18, 2021	
31	Mon-chelin Guide (몬슐랭가이드)	Monsta X (Minhyuk, Kihyun, I.M)	November 23, 2021	Broadcast started at 20:30 (KST); Hyungwon is absent
32	WKMK Night ☆ (윜밐 Night ☆)	Weki Meki	November 25, 2021	Weki Meki member Kim Do-yeon is absent
33	A Good World (사이 좋은 월드)	B.I.G	November 29, 2021	
34	Boy Maestro (소년 마에스트로)	Ghost9	December 2, 2021	
35	Very Lucky (Woon Woon) Day (운운한 날)	—N/a	December 6, 2021	Special DJs: Ha Sung-woon, Jeong Se-woon
36	♡I-Lo-VE♡ (♡I러VE♡)	IVE	December 9, 2021	Special DJs: Ha Sung-woon, Jeong Se-woon
37	SF9 View Relationship (셒각관계)	SF9 (Youngbin, Jaeyoon, Zuho)	December 13, 2021	Special DJs: Ha Sung-woon, Jeong Se-woon
38	The World's Best Ateez Bragging Contest (천하 제일 에이티즈 자랑 대회)	Ateez	December 16, 2021	Special DJs: Ha Sung-woon, Jeong Se-woon
39	Idol Radio's Pirate (아이돌라디'호'의 해적)	Everglow	December 21, 2021	Special DJs: Ha Sung-woon, Jeong Se-woon
40	Snowy Billlie Night	Billlie	December 23, 2021	Special DJs: Ha Sung-woon, Jeong Se-woon
41	Idol Radio Winter Music Festival (아이돌라디오 겨울음악회)	Golden Child (Y, Hong Joo-chan); Weeekly (Monday, Park So-eun)	December 27, 2021	Special DJs: Ha Sung-woon, Jeong Se-woon
42	Rookie Party (루키 Party)	Purple Kiss (Ireh, Chaein); Mirae (Son Dong-pyo, Park Si-young); Omega X (Hangyeom, Yechan)	December 30, 2021	Special DJs: Ha Sung-woon, Jeong Se-woon

== Episodes (Season 2 - 2022) ==
List of episodes (Season 2 episode 43-110)

Note 1: Due to Joohoney and Hyungwon's promotional activities with Monsta X in the United States, Japan and Germany, special DJs would stand in for them from episode 81 to 98.
Note 2: After Joohoney and Hyungwon have stepped down as the show's radio DJs on episode 104, special DJ(s) would be in for every episode.

Episode #	Episode Title	Guest(s)	Broadcast Date	Remark(s)
43	Year of the Tiger with "Wild Idol" (호랑이의 해 ‘야생돌’과 함께)	TAN	January 3, 2022	Special DJs: Ha Sung-woon, Jeong Se-woon
44	Idol Radio PoPo Awards (아이돌라디오 포포 어워즈)	—N/a	January 6, 2022	
45	Kep1er Has Come-DADA (케플러가 왔DADA)	Kep1er	January 10, 2022	
46	Best Friends Harmony (짝꿍 하모니)	P1Harmony	January 13, 2022	
47	Chocome VS ChaeGgulDJs 'Idol Radio War' (쪼꼬미 VS 채꿀디 '아이돌라디워(War)')	WJSN Chocome	January 17, 2022	
48	Idol Radio Dark Heroes (아이돌라디오에 다크히어로의)	Drippin	January 20, 2022	
49	Victon's Time (빅톤의 시간)	Victon	January 24, 2022	Victon member Han Seung-woo is absent
50	SOLO Queendom (SOLO 퀸덤)	Jeong Ye-in; Yuju; Choi Ye-na	January 27, 2022	
51	If We're Together With JinJin & Rocky (진진 라키와 함께라면)	Jinjin & Rocky	January 31, 2022	
52	Interaction Kings (소통왕즈)	AB6IX (Jeon Woong, Kim Dong-hyun); CIX (BX, Yonghee)	February 3, 2022	
53	Jamie's Party (제이미's Party)	Jamie	February 7, 2022	
54	One And OnlyOneOf (원앤온리원오브)	OnlyOneOf	February 10, 2022	
55	Valentine DRAMARAMA (발렌타인 DRAMARAMA)	P1Harmony (Theo, Jiung); Mirae (Lee Jun-hyuk, Lien); TAN (Jooan, Jiseong)	February 14, 2022	
56	VIVIZ Is The Light♡ (VIVIZ가 빛이지♡)	Viviz	February 17, 2022	
57	Apink is 12 Years Old (에이핑크는 열두 살)	Apink	February 21, 2022	
58	RUN 2 STAYC	STAYC	February 24, 2022	
59	Treasure's Power JIKJIN (트레저의 파워 직진)	Treasure	February 28, 2022	
60	Tempest Stanning Watch (폭풍 입덕 주의보)	Tempest	March 3, 2022	
61	Cherry Bullet In Space (체리블렛 In Space)	Cherry Bullet	March 7, 2022	
62	The Day When Eunbi Comes Down (은비가 내리는 날)	Kwon Eun-bi	March 10, 2022	
63	Weeekly-ality (위클리-얼리티)	Weeekly	March 14, 2022	Weeekly member Shin Ji-yoon is absent
64	Let's Only Walk On The TAN TAN Boulevard (TAN TAN 대로만 걷자)	TAN	March 17, 2022	
65	♥Lovey Dovey♥ (♥알콩딴콩♥)	Moonbin & Sanha	March 21, 2022	
66	With God of K-POP (K-POP의 신과 함께)	Kihyun (Monsta X)	March 24, 2022	
67	CravityGO (크래비티GO)	Cravity	March 28, 2022	
68	Oh My Real Love	Oh My Girl	March 31, 2022	Oh My Girl member YooA is absent
69	Spring That PurKi Likes (퍼키를 좋아하나 봄♡)	Purple Kiss	April 5, 2022	
70	First WEi (First 위아이)	WEi	April 7, 2022	
71	Introduce Me Good People (좋은 사람 있으면 소개시켜줘)	D-Crunch (Hyunwook, Hyunoh); Kingdom (Dann, Mujin); NINE.i (Eden, Vahn)	April 11, 2022	
72	Blue and Beautiful Hyungwon's Poem (푸르고 아름다운 형원의 시)	—N/a	April 14, 2022	Changed from original guests Epex due to unforeseen circumstances
73	Genre is Dreamcatcher (장르가 드림캐쳐)	Dreamcatcher	April 18, 2022	
74	Hold the Breath, LOVED IVE (숨 참고 LOVED IVE)	IVE	April 21, 2022	
75	DKZ Sick (DKZ 앓이)	DKZ	April 25, 2022	
76	Fantastic Verivery and Where to Find Them (신비한 베리베리 사전)	Verivery	April 28, 2022	
77	Love, That's Hyungwon & Joohoney (사랑, 그것은 ‘형원&주헌’)	—N/a	May 2, 2022	
78	CLASS:y's Day (클라씨의 날)	CLASS:y	May 5, 2022	
79	YOUNI-BIRTH Day	Younite	May 9, 2022	Broadcast started at 20:20 (KST)
80	We Are E'LaST B (우리는 엘라ST B)	E'Last (Romin, Won Hyuk, Wonjun); Just B (Bain, Lim Ji-min, DY)	May 12, 2022	
81	WOODZverse!	—N/a	May 16, 2022	Special DJ: Woodz
82	Here is your Garden	Jeong Se-woon	May 19, 2022	Special DJ: Woodz
83	Come At Us, Moons (달님들 다 드루와)	Oneus	May 23, 2022	Special DJs: Woodz, Jeon Woong (AB6IX)
84	AB6IX is Three Years Old ♡ (예삐는 세 살♡)	AB6IX	May 26, 2022	Special DJs: Woodz, Jeon Woong (AB6IX)
85	HAPPY Z-Jjang DJs DAY (HAPPY 즈짱디 DAY)	—N/a	May 30, 2022	Special DJs: Woodz, Jaechan (DKZ)
86	Return of BVNDIT	Bvndit	June 2, 2022	Special DJs: Woodz, Jaechan (DKZ)
87	THX to TNX	TNX	June 6, 2022	Special DJs: Woodz, Son Dong-pyo (Mirae)
88	woo!ah! So Sweet (우아 So Sweet)	Woo!ah!	June 9, 2022	Special DJs: Woodz, Son Dong-pyo (Mirae)
89	Chaos of Chemi (케미의 Chaos)	Victon	June 13, 2022	Special DJs: Woodz, Kim Yo-han (WEi)
90	DooDoomChit Doo-DOOMCHITA (두둠칫 두둠치타)	Secret Number	June 16, 2022	Special DJs: Woodz, Hangyul (BAE173)
91	ZERO Sum Chemi (ZERO 썸 케미)	Drippin	June 20, 2022	Special DJs: Woodz, Junho (Drippin)
92	A Midsummer Night's Loona (한여름 밤의 이달소)	Loona	June 23, 2022	Special DJs: Choi Ye-na, Heejin (Loona)
93	Soulmate (소울메이트)	—N/a	June 27, 2022	Special DJs: Choi Ye-na, Jo Yu-ri
94	DolRa Girls (돌라걸스)	bugAboo (Choyeon, Eunchae, Cyan); Lapillus (Chanty, Shana, Seowon)	June 30, 2022	Special DJ: Choi Ye-na
95	PLAY Some (PLAY 썸)	Omega X	July 5, 2022	Special DJs: N.Flying (Yoo Hwe-seung, Seo Dong-sung)
96	People Who Ordered LOVEADE (LOVEADE 시키신 분)	Viviz	July 7, 2022	Special DJs: N.Flying (Cha Hun, Kim Jae-hyun)
97	Summer Music Festival (여름 음악회)	Purple Kiss (Na Go-eun, Swan); Kim Young-heum; Lee Byeong-chan	July 11, 2022	Special DJs: Kim Jae-hwan, Jeong Se-woon
98	QueenJSN (Queen주소녀)	WJSN	July 14, 2022	Special DJs: Kim Jae-hwan, Jeong Se-woon
99	ChaeGgulDJs COME BACK (채꿀디 COME BACK)	—N/a	July 18, 2022	
100	100 Out of 100 (100점 만점에 100점)	ChoBom	July 21, 2022	
101	Handsome Party (잘생김 파티)	SF9 (Jaeyoon, Yoo Tae-yang, Hwiyoung)	July 26, 2022	
102	WE NEED STAYC	STAYC	July 28, 2022	
103	P to the 1 to the Harmony (피 to the 원 to the 하모니)	P1Harmony	August 2, 2022	
104	Not ChaeGgulDJs' Farewell But Two Stars (채꿀디와 이별 아닌 두 개의 ⭐)	—N/a	August 4, 2022	Last episode for Joohoney and Hyungwon as DJs
105	Time With JAM (Had A Fun Time) (JAM 있는 시간)	JO1 (Junki Kono, Ren Kawashiri, Shion Tsurubo, Takumi Kawanishi)	August 9, 2022	Special DJs: Pentagon (Yuto, Kino)
106	Ateez World of Dreams and Fantasies (꿈과 환상의 에이티즈 월드)	Ateez	August 11, 2022	Special DJs: Ateez (Hongjoong, San)
107	Hey Jigumis!!!! (지구미야!!!!)	Choi Ye-na	August 16, 2022	Special DJ: Choi Sung-min
108	The Beginning ATBO	ATBO	August 18, 2022	Special DJ: Jay B (Got7)
109	Password 458 (비밀번호 458)	CIX	August 23, 2022	Special DJs: CIX (Bae Jin-young, Hyunsuk)
110	7272 CSR (7272 첫사랑)	CSR	August 25, 2022	Special DJ: Kwon Eun-bi; Final episode of Season 2

== Episodes (Season 3 - 2022) ==
List of episodes (Season 3 episode 1-32)

Note: In episodes that Hongjoong and/or Yunho did not appear, special DJ(s) would stand in for them, as listed in the remarks section.

Episode #	Episode Title	Guest(s)	Broadcast Date	Remark(s)
1	We Are DaengJjoongDJs! We're Gonna Be Great DJs! (우린 댕쭝디! 멋진 디제이가 될 거야!)	—N/a	September 12, 2022	
2	Oneus are Six Stars⭐⭐⭐⭐⭐⭐ (원어스는 별이 여섯개⭐⭐⭐⭐⭐⭐)	Oneus	September 13, 2022	
3	Bling Bling Shining Tempest (블링블링 샤이닝 템페스트)	Tempest	September 19, 2022	
4	Ready Action Rocket Punch (Ready Action 로켓펀치)	Rocket Punch	September 21, 2022	
5	♡Love~Pirates Squad♡ (♡사랑해~적단♡)	Younite (Eunho, Hyungseok); TNX (Choi Tae-hun, Oh Sung-jun); ATBO (Ryu Jun-min, Jeong Seung-hwan)	September 26, 2022	Pre-recorded on September 21, 2022 at 18:00 (KST)
6	GRATATA That's Right! (GRATATA 그라췌!)	Lapillus	September 28, 2022	
7	Mirae is the Future!!! (미래소년이 미래다!!!)	Mirae	October 3, 2022	Broadcast began at 21:30 (KST)
8	Let's Cravity Party! (Let's 크래비티 Party!)	Cravity	October 5, 2022	
9	The Best Jamie with The Best Adora (짱 제이미 있는 짱 아도라)	Jamie; Adora	October 10, 2022	
10	LOVE is TAN	TAN	October 12, 2022	
11	☆Hello~ Treasure☆ (☆안녕~ 트레저☆)	Treasure	October 17, 2022	
12	Save Us Dreamcatcher♡ (구해줘요 드림캐쳐♡)	Dreamcatcher	October 18, 2022	Pre-recorded on October 12, 2022 at 18:00 (KST)
13	DKZ Has Appeared!!! (DKZ가 나타났다!!!)	DKZ	October 24, 2022	Broadcast began at 19:30 (KST)
14	☆Shine LimeLight!☆ (☆빛나라 라임라잇!☆)	LimeLight	October 26, 2022	
15	♡Love Pirates Squad♡ ver. Handsome Party♡ (♡사랑해적단 ver.잘생김파티♡)	Drippin (Kim Min-seo, Cha Jun-ho); P1Harmony (Keeho, Intak); TAN (Jooan, Taehoon)	November 7, 2022	The episode was originally scheduled for October 31, 2022, but it would instead be privately recorded on the scheduled date and then released on the broadcast date
16	Would Have Fallen for Younite (유나이트에게 반할걸)	Younite	November 8, 2022	Special DJs: AB6IX (Jeon Woong, Kim Dong-hyun)
17	Come Here~ Play with Epex! (이리 오너라~ 이펙스랑 놀자!)	Epex	November 9, 2022	Special DJs: CIX (BX, Yonghee); The episode was originally scheduled for November 2, 2022, but it would instead be privately recorded on the scheduled date and then released on the broadcast date
18	The Whole World is Paying Attention To Us (전 세계가 우릴 주목해)	TripleS Acid Angel from Asia	November 10, 2022	Special DJs: Seunghee (Oh My Girl), Lee Chae-yeon
—N/a	Idol Radio Live in Tokyo (아이돌라디오 라이브 인 도쿄)	Youngjae (Got7); Monsta X (Hyungwon, Joohoney); Astro (Jinjin, Moonbin, Rocky, Yoon San-ha); Golden Child; STAYC; INI	November 12, 2022	Pre-recorded on October 20, 2022
19	Flower Love You ATBO♡ (ATBO 화랑해♡)	ATBO	November 14, 2022	Special DJs: Seunghee (Oh My Girl), Lee Chae-yeon
20	Drippin is One♡ (드리핀은 하나♡)	Drippin	November 16, 2022	Special DJs: Golden Child (Lee Jang-jun, Hong Joo-chan)
21	woo!ah! Wow LAND (우아와우LAND)	Woo!ah!	November 21, 2022	Special DJ: Jo Yu-ri
22	Trendz's A to Z (트렌드지의 A to Z)	Trendz	November 24, 2022	Special DJs: SF9 (Zuho, Yoo Tae-yang)
23	Turtle♡Rabbit (거북이♡토끼)	Kim Jong-hyeon	November 28, 2022	Special DJ: Ren
24	The Miracle of 1415 Days (1415일의 기적)	Verivery	November 30, 2022	Special DJs: Verivery (Dongheon, Kangmin)
25	Idols Who Swallowed The Sun (태양을 삼킨 아이돌)	P1Harmony	December 5, 2022	Special DJs: P1Harmony (Jiung, Intak)
26	December's Gift (12월의 선물)	Tempest	December 7, 2022	Special DJ: Lew (Tempest)
27	Sing Song Live Song (싱송생송)	Stella Jang; Jeong Ye-in; Adora	December 12, 2022	Special DJ: Eden
28	One Mouth Boy Only Want You (한입 Boy 너만 원해)	Maddox; Mingyu (DKZ); Won Hyuk (E'Last); Bain (Just B)	December 14, 2022	Special DJ: Eden
29	DaengJjoongDJ is Back! To the DolRang Position! (댕쭝디 is Back! 돌랑이들 위치로!)	—N/a	December 21, 2022	Broadcast began at 19:30 (KST)
30	n.SSign Constellation (엔싸인 별자리)	n.SSign	December 22, 2022	Broadcast began at 18:30 (KST)
31	♡Love Pirates Squad♡ ver. Heartthrob Party♡ (♡사랑해적단 ver.설렘파티♡)	Drippin (Kim Min-seo, Cha Jun-ho); P1Harmony (Keeho, Intak); TAN (Jooan, Taehoon)	December 27, 2022	
32	ATEEZ Present	Ateez	December 29, 2022	

== Episodes (Season 3 - 2023) ==
List of episodes (Season 3 episode 33-132)

Note: In episodes that Hongjoong and/or Yunho did not appear, special DJ(s) would stand in for them, special DJ(s) would stand in for them, as listed in the remarks section.

Episode #	Episode Title	Guest(s)	Broadcast Date	Remark(s)
33	♡Love Pirates Squad♡ ver. Candy Boy♡ (♡사랑해적단 ver.캔디보이♡)	DKZ (Mingyu, Giseok); The New Six (Jang Hyun-soo, Oh Sung-jun); ATBO (Oh Jun-seok, Seok Rak-won)	January 3, 2023	
34	TO1 and TOgether (TO1과 TOgether)	TO1	January 4, 2023	
35	ILY:1 Fairytale (아일리원 동화)	ILY:1	January 9, 2023	
36	Flower Fragrance Spreads Hundred Miles, Monsta X Fragrance Spreads Ten Thousand Miles (화향백리 몬향만리)	Monsta X (Minhyuk, Hyungwon)	January 11, 2023	
37	Roses That Blossom in Idol Radio (아이돌라디오에 피어난 장미)	H1-Key	January 16, 2023	
38	SF9's Alibi (셒구의 알리바이)	SF9 (Jaeyoon, Yoo Tae-yang)	January 18, 2023	Broadcast began at 21:30 (KST); Originally together with SF9 member Zuho as guest, he would be absent due to health reasons
39	Cignature YA YA (시그니처 YA YA)	Cignature	January 23, 2023	
40	♡Love Pirates 99 Squad (♡사랑해적 99단)	U (ONF); Golden Child (Kim Dong-hyun, Hong Joo-chan); Lee Hyeop (Drippin)	January 25, 2023	
41	From Now It's 8TURN's Time (이제부터 8TURN(에잇턴)의 시간)	8Turn	January 30, 2023	Broadcast began at 21:30 (KST)
42	♡Love Pirates Photocard Squad♡ (♡사랑해적 포카단♡)	J.You (TO1); Won Hyuk (E'Last); Lee Jun-hyuk (Mirae)	February 1, 2023	Pre-recorded on January 25, 2023 at 18:00 (KST)
43	Viviz One Year Old PARTY (비비지 한 살 PARTY)	Viviz	February 6, 2023	
44	2016.03.02	—N/a	February 8, 2023	Beginning this episode, due to the closing of Universe, viewable streaming would only be available on the MBC Radio official YouTube channel
45	Young&Pretty&Hip	Tri.be	February 14, 2023	Special DJs: N.Flying (Kim Jae-hyun, Yoo Hwe-seung); Tri.be member Jinha is absent Broadcast began at 22:00 (KST)
46	STAYC-topia	STAYC	February 15, 2023	Special DJ: Jaeyoon (SF9)
47	Rising STAR	TripleS (Note: As of the date of the broadcast, the full group consisted of Yoon Seo-yeon, Jeong Hye-rin, Lee Ji-woo, Kim Chae-yeon, Kim Yoo-yeon, Kim Soo-min, Kim Na-kyoung, Gong Yu-bin, Kaede, Seo Da-hyun, Kotone and Kwak Yeon-ji. However, Kotone and Kwak Yeon-ji did not appear in this broadcast.)	February 20, 2023	Special DJs: SF9 (Zuho, Yoo Tae-yang)
48	Love is TNX	TNX	February 22, 2023	Special DJs: SF9 (Zuho, Yoo Tae-yang); TNX member Junhyeok is absent
49	K-POP's Top Tier (K-POP의 Top Tier)	Park Woo-jin (AB6IX)	February 27, 2023	Special DJ: Yoon Ji-sung
50	☆Siren Order☆	Purple Kiss	March 1, 2023	Special DJs: Oneus (Leedo, Keonhee)
51	OnlyOneOf drift	OnlyOneOf	March 6, 2023	Special DJs: Oneus (Leedo, Keonhee)
52	Cherry Bullet Birthday Cafe (Cherry Bullet 생카)	Cherry Bullet	March 8, 2023	Special DJs: Oneus (Leedo, Keonhee); Cherry Bullet member Yuju is absent
53	DaengJjoongDJs School Opening Ceremony (댕쭝디 개학식)	—N/a	March 13, 2023	
Special	IDOL RADIO LIVE IN JAPAN special	iKon	March 15, 2023	Broadcast began at 18:00 (KST)
54	You make me feel so CRAVITY	Cravity	March 15, 2023	
55	Super Star Golden Bell (슈퍼 스타 골든벨)	Nicole (Kara); Kim Jae-hwan	March 20, 2023	
56	Old Friends	Ateez (Seonghwa, Mingi)	March 22, 2023	
56	Bravo~ Cool Fifty! (브라보~ 멋지다 핍티!)	Fifty Fifty	March 27, 2023	Broadcast began at 19:00 (KST)
57-58	Idol Radio Live in Japan	iKon; Astro (Moonbin & Sanha); Viviz; Oneus n.SSign; LimeLight	April 1–2, 2023	
59	Go Thrill Go E'Last (Go Thrill Go 엘라스트)	E'Last	April 3, 2023	Pre-recorded on March 27, 2023 at 22:00 (KST)
60	Best Rookies xikers Arrive (짱신인 xikers 등장)	Xikers	April 5, 2023	Pre-recorded on April 5, 2023 at 16:00 (KST)
61	I Kep1er You	Kep1er	April 10, 2023	
62	Billlie LOVE	Billlie	April 12, 2023	Broadcast began at 21:30 (KST)
63	Lemonade Rolled by DreamNote (드림노트가 말아준 레모네이드)	DreamNote	April 17, 2023	
64	Idols of the Storm (폭풍의 아이돌)	Tempest	April 19, 2023	
65	K-POP's Rising Light (Gikwang) (K-POP의 기광)	Lee Gi-kwang (Highlight)	April 24, 2023	Broadcast would be proceeded privately
66	K-POP's Scene Stealer (K-POP의 신스틸러)	Drippin	April 26, 2023	
67	The Day EPEX Comes To Idol Radio (EPEX가 아돌라 오는 날)	Epex	May 1, 2023	Broadcast would be proceeded privately
68	Homecoming Day	Young K (Day6)	May 3, 2023	Broadcast would be proceeded privately Special guest appearances by H1-Key (Seoi, Yel) and Youngjae (Got7)
69	Idol Radio Heroes (아이돌라디오 히어로즈)	Xdinary Heroes	May 8, 2023	Special DJ: Young K (Day6)
70	♡Ye-Chae-Bbang♡ (♡예채빵♡)	Ryu Su-jeong; Jang Ye-eun; Lee Chae-yeon	May 10, 2023	Special DJ: Young K (Day6)
71	Thank You VERIVERY Much (땡큐 VERIVERY 머치)	Verivery	May 15, 2023	Special DJ: Young K (Day6)
72	Oneus in My Head (내 머릿속의 원어스)	Oneus	May 17, 2023	Special DJ: Young K (Day6)
73	K-POP's New Wind (K-POP의 새로운 바람)	The Wind	May 22, 2023	Broadcast began at 20:30 (KST)
74	We Are UNITBO (우리는 UNITBO)	Younite; ATBO	May 24, 2023	
75	Dreamcatcher Should Show Us What They Saw❤️ (드림캐쳐가 본때를 보여줘야지❤️)	Dreamcatcher	May 29, 2023	Broadcast began at 21:30 (KST)
76	❤️HwiWoongHwiWoong❤️ (❤️휘웅휘웅❤️)	AB6IX (Jeon Woong, Lee Dae-hwi)	May 31, 2023	Changed from original guest Lee Mi-joo due to her testing positive for COVID-19
77	Trust and Listen to Credit KARD (믿고 듣는 신용 KARD)	Kard	June 5, 2023	
78	Idol Radio Bosses' Favourite Employees Recruitment (돌라 상사 최애사원 모집)	Nine to Six; Secret Number (Dita, Minji)	June 7, 2023	
79	INI I.L.Y❣️	INI	June 12, 2023	
80	Catch! Heartuping💗 (캐치! 하튜핑💗)	P1Harmony (Theo, Keeho, Intak); The New Six (Woo Kyung-jun, Choi Tae-hun, Eun Hwi)	June 14, 2023	
81	🌙Be The Light (🌙빛이 되어줘)	Lun8	June 19, 2023	Broadcast started at 20:00 (KST)
82	A Different Kind of Spicy ATEEZ Vibe (좀 다른 Spicy ATEEZ Vibe)	Ateez	June 21, 2023	
83	The Genre is Kang Daniel (장르가 바로 강다니엘)	Kang Daniel	June 26, 2023	Broadcast would be proceeded privately
84	Ready To 🐶🐱Gain (Ready To 🐶🐱이득)	Ren; Kim Jae-hwan	June 28, 2023	
85	WEi 1000 Days Party💗 (위아이 1000일 PARTY💗)	WEi	July 3, 2023	
86	Login Plave (Login 플레이브)	Plave (Noah, Yejun, Hamin)	July 5, 2023	Broadcast would be proceeded privately
87	You (T5)? (너 (T5)야?)	Treasure T5	July 10, 2023	
88	I'm Koyote 25 Years Old, Friends With DaengJjoong DJs☺ (나 코요태 25살, 댕쭝디와 칭구칭긔☺)	Koyote	July 12, 2023	
89	HashTag We Missed You So Much↗ (해시태그 여러분 너무 보고 싶었어↗)	HashTag	July 17, 2023	
90	Idol Playlist <Hongjoong> (아이돌 플레이리스트 <홍중>편)	—N/a	July 23, 2023	Only listenable
91	🌺ZB1 Flowers Have Bloomed💐 (🌺제베원 꽃이 피었습니다💐)	Zerobaseone	July 25, 2023	
92	Shownu X Hyungwon's Door Breach (셔누X형원의 문짝단속🚪)	Shownu X Hyungwon (Monsta X)	July 26, 2023	Broadcast would be proceeded privately
93	Idol Music Show! King of Coin Singers (아이돌 뮤직쇼! 동전가왕)	Chunji (Teen Top); Mingyu (DKZ); Swan (Purple Kiss)	July 31, 2023	Broadcast would be proceeded privately
94	Idol Playlist <Yunho> (아이돌 플레이리스트 <윤호>편)	—N/a	August 6, 2023	Only listenable
95	Song Requests maketh Idol Radio (신청곡 maketh 아돌라)	—N/a	August 7, 2023	
96	Can Hear Oh My Girl~💙 (오마이걸이 들려~💙)	Oh My Girl (Seunghee, Yubin, Arin)	August 9, 2023	
97	Don't Be A Chicken Just Do xikers (쫄지마 그냥 Do xikers)	Xikers	August 14, 2023	Special DJ: Moonbyul (Mamamoo); Xikers member Junghoon is absent
98	No Doubt 'BONA BONA' (보나마나 'BONA BONA')	Treasure	August 16, 2023	Special DJ: Moonbyul (Mamamoo)
99	🚕Starry Night Midnight TAXI🚕 (🚕별이 빛나는 밤의 심야TAXI🚕)	Jo Yu-ri	August 21, 2023	Special DJ: Moonbyul (Mamamoo)
100	Unbeli-Bubble🫧 Hexagon! Bae.Park.Lee.Yoon.Sim.Jang! (언빌리Bubble🫧 육각형! 배.박.이.윤.심.장!)	STAYC	August 23, 2023	Special DJ: Moonbyul (Mamamoo)
101	KIOF Music Show! King of Coin Singers (키오프 뮤직쇼! 동전가왕)	Kiss of Life	August 28, 2023	Special DJ: Moonbyul (Mamamoo)
102	All MY EVERGLOW (올 MY EVERGLOW)	Everglow	August 30, 2023	Special DJ: Moonbyul (Mamamoo)
103	Rocket Punch, It's BOOM!!👊 (로켓펀치, BOOM이에요!!👊)	Rocket Punch	September 4, 2023	Special DJ: Moonbyul (Mamamoo)
104	Seoul's Eleven Heaven👼🏻 (서울의 일레븐 헤븐👼🏻)	Purple Kiss; H1-Key	September 6, 2023	Special DJ: Moonbyul (Mamamoo)
105	The Only Boy Next Door🏡 (나만 없어 옆집 소년🏡)	BoyNextDoor	September 11, 2023	
106	✨Idol Radio Concert✨ Trial LUCY ver. (✨아돌라콘✨체험판 LUCY ver.)	Lucy	September 13, 2023	
107	✨Idol Radio Concert✨ Trial Kim Jae-joong ver. (✨아돌라콘✨체험판 김재중 ver.)	Kim Jae-joong	September 18, 2023	Pre-recorded on September 12, 2023 at 18:00 (KST)
108	Idol Playlist <IDOL RADIO LIVE IN SEOUL> (아이돌 플레이리스트 <IDOL RADIO LIVE IN SEOUL>편)	—N/a	September 24, 2023	
109	Idol Playlist <Chuseok> (아이돌 플레이리스트 <추석>편)	—N/a	September 30, 2023	
110	Idol Playlist <Chuseok> (아이돌 플레이리스트 <추석>편)	—N/a	October 1, 2023	
111	Only Focus On Cravity Tonight (크래비티에게만 집중해 Tonight)	Cravity	October 4, 2023	
112	ONF Comeback Start, A Very Big Start (온앤오프 컴백 시작, 엄청 크게 시작)	ONF	October 5, 2023	
113	The Boys in Full Metal Jackets (풀 메탈 재킷을 걸친 소년들)	Epex	October 9, 2023	
114	Welcome, First Time on Idol Radio? (어서와 아돌라는 처음이지?)	Evnne	October 11, 2023	
115	🍂Idol Radio Black Agents: Code Name Autumn🍂 (🍂아돌라 블랙요원 : 코드명 가을🍂)	Moon Jong-up; Jaechan (DKZ); Woono (Younite)	October 16, 2023	Pre-recorded on October 9, 2023 at 18:00 (KST)
116	Loossemble's Newtopia (루셈블의 뉴토피아)	Loossemble	October 18, 2023	Pre-recorded on October 11, 2023 at 18:00 (KST)
117	Idol Radio and INI are One🌼 (아돌라와 INI는 하나🌼)	INI (Masaya Kimura, Xu Fengfan, Shogo Tajima, Hiromu Takatsuka, Takumi Ozaki)	October 23, 2023	Special DJ: Kim Jae-hwan
118	Heaven (Extreme Rock) is Also Rock! (극락도 ROCK이다!)	Xdinary Heroes	October 25, 2023	Special DJ: Jihoon (Treasure)
119	I Don't Care If You're An Alien (네가 외계인이든 간에 상관 안 해)	Plave	October 30, 2023	Broadcast would be proceeded privately
120	Epik High Time Just Like Any Other Day (여느 날과 다를 것 없는 Epik High Time)	Epik High	November 2, 2023	
121	Can you feel my GolCha beat? (Can you feel my 골차 beat?)	Golden Child	November 6, 2023	Special DJs: Golden Child (Lee Dae-yeol, Hong Joo-chan)
122	Idol Radio Calls Weeekly (Vroom Vroom)🚘💨 (아돌라가 위클리를 부름부름🚘💨)	Weeekly	November 2, 2023	Special DJ: Kim Jae-hwan
123	VIVIZ VS VIVIZ	Viviz	November 13, 2023	
124	Idol Radio's Melting Point: Zerobaseone (아돌라의 녹는 점 : 제로베이스원)	Zerobaseone	November 15, 2023	Broadcast would be proceeded privately
125	My Heart's Colour is WHIB 🤍🖤 (내 심장의 색깔은 WHIB 🤍🖤)	WHIB	November 20, 2023	
126	Jjong Dieter PICK! Dreamcatcher OOTD First Reveal! (쭝디터 PICK! 드림캐쳐 OOTD 최초공개!)	Dreamcatcher	November 22, 2023	Broadcast would be proceeded privately
127	—N/a	—N/a	December 2, 2023	Only listenable
128	—N/a	—N/a	December 2, 2023	Only listenable
—N/a	Idol Radio Live in Tokyo Special	—N/a	December 4, 2023	
129	We Invite You to MCND, A Country of Dreams and Fantasies 💌🎟️ (꿈과 환상의 나라 MCND로 초대합니다💌🎟️)	MCND	December 6, 2023	
130	Pro DJs DdaengJjoong, Crazy Form Ateez in the Moon? (PRO 디제이 댕쭝디가, 달나라에선 폼 미친 에이티즈?)	—N/a	December 11, 2023	
131	Idol Radio Wishlist is LUCY🎁 (아돌라 위시리스트는 LUCY🎁)	Lucy	December 18, 2023	
—N/a	Idol Radio Live in Seoul Special	—N/a	December 25, 2023	
132	We Are DaengJjoongDJs! We Have Become Great DJs! (우린 댕쭝디! 멋진 디제이가 됐어!)	—N/a	December 27, 2023	Last episode for Hongjoong and Yunho as DJs

== Episodes (Season 3 - 2024) ==
List of episodes (Season 3 episode 133-146)

Note: After Hongjoong and Yunho have stepped down as the show's radio DJs on episode 132, special DJ(s) would be in for every episode.

Episode #	Episode Title	Guest(s)	Broadcast Date	Remark(s)
133	STUNNING 2024 Together with 8TURN (8TURN과 함께 하는 STUNNING 2024)	8Turn	January 1, 2024	Special DJs: ONF (E-Tion, Seungjun)
134	Jong-hyeon's New Season (종현이의 새로운 계절)	Kim Jong-hyeon	January 3, 2024	Special DJs: ONF (E-Tion, Seungjun)
135	Recruiting New Club Members (동아리 신입회원 모집)	DKZ	January 8, 2024	Special DJs: SF9 (Youngbin, Inseong)
136	Bibora's Blessing Come Down ☔️ (비보라의 축복이 내려와앙 ☔️)	SF9	January 10, 2024	Special DJs: SF9 (Youngbin, Inseong); SF9 member Jaeyoon is absent
137	The Link of B1A4 and Idol Radio (B1A4와 아돌라의 연결고리)	B1A4 (CNU, Sandeul)	January 15, 2024	Special DJs: SF9 (Youngbin, Zuho)
138	Singer-songwri-dols' Hmm BOP SHOW (싱어송라이돌의 흠뻑 SHOW)	Hui (Pentagon); Jeong Se-woon	January 17, 2024	Special DJs: SF9 (Youngbin, Zuho)
139	Some TA-DA! with LIMELIGHT (LIMELIGHT과 썸TA-DA!)	LimeLight	January 22, 2024	Special DJ: DK (iKon)
140	Yena Jigumina (Even Now) SeolA Pretty 🐱🐥💕 (예나지금이나 설아름다워🐱🐥💕)	SeolA (WJSN); Choi Ye-na	January 24, 2024	Special DJ: DK (iKon)
141	Think About H1-KEY Whether I Sit or Stand😍 (앉으나 서나 H1-KEY 생각😍)	H1-Key	January 29, 2024	Special DJs: ONF (E-Tion, Seungjun)
142	This is EVNNE! (이게 EVNNE 이지예!)	Evnne	January 31, 2024	Special DJs: ONF (E-Tion, Seungjun)
143	Welcome JD1, First Time on Idol Radio? (JD1 어서와, 아돌라는 처음이지?)	JD1 (Jeong Dong-won)	February 5, 2024	Special DJs: Cravity (Jungmo, Minhee)
144	This is P1Harmony's Looking Good (Killin' It) (이게 바로 P1Harmony의 때깔)	P1Harmony	February 7, 2024	Special DJs: Cravity (Jungmo, Seongmin)
145	Vanner is_Bursting the Jackpot_in Idol Radio (아돌라에서_배너가_잭팟터트림)	Vanner	February 12, 2024	Special DJ: Cravity (Jungmo, Wonjin)
146	This is Year 2024's 'Trendz' (이게 바로 2024년 ‘트렌드지’)	Trendz	February 14, 2024	Special DJ: Cravity (Jungmo, Wonjin); Final episode of Season 3

== Episodes (Season 4 - 2024) ==
List of episodes (Season 4 episode 1-85)

Note: In episodes that Sunwoo did not appear, special DJ(s) would stand in for him, as listed in the remarks section.

Episode #	Episode Title	Guest(s)	Broadcast Date	Remark(s)
1	Sunwoo, You're My Only Photosynthesis (선우, 넌 나만의 광합성)	—N/a	February 19, 2024	
2	21st Century Muse, Moonbyul (21세기 뮤즈, 문별)	Moonbyul (Mamamoo)	February 21, 2024	
3	What High Teen is The Wind Rolling (더윈드가 말아주는 하이틴 어떤디)	The Wind	February 26, 2024	The Wind member An Chan-won is absent
4	Tri.be💎Only Walks On💎Diamond Road (트라이비💎다이아몬드💎길만 걸어)	Tri.be	February 28, 2024	
5	If DolRang Had Said 'Love You Cravity'? Then They Won't Appear on Idol Radio with 'Love or Die' (돌랑이가 '크래비티 사랑해' 했잖아? 그럼 'Love or Die'로 아돌라 안 나왔어)	Cravity (Serim, Allen, Wonjin, Hyeongjun, Taeyoung, Seongmin)	March 4, 2024	
6	Virtual Idol, But your IDOL (버추얼 아이돌, But your IDOL)	Plave	March 6, 2024	
7	Ddun DJ's Counselling Center 'Ddun Got Concerns?' (떤디의 고민상담소 '고민있떤?')	—N/a	March 11, 2024	
8	xikers Don't Stop (xikers는 멈추지 않아)	Xikers	March 13, 2024	Xikers member Junghoon is absent
9	Follow Me to the Rooftop to Meet YooA! (유아 만나러 옥땅으로 따라와!)	YooA (Oh My Girl)	March 18, 2024	Special DJ: Jun. K (2PM)
10	Tempest's Voyage to Idol Radio (아돌라를 향한 템페스트의 항해)	Tempest	March 20, 2024	Tempest member Hwarang is absent
11	It's Dawn, X:IN Please Raise Your Heads (날이 밝았습니다 X:IN은 고개를 들어주세요)	X:IN	March 25, 2024	
12	TAN's Growth Diary (TAN의 성장일기)	TAN	April 1, 2024	
13	The Boyz Appeared on The B's Birthday... (더비 생일에 더보이즈의 등장이라...)	The Boyz (Hyunjae, Q, Eric)	April 3, 2024	
14	DRIPPIN Stanning Maze, There is No Exit (DRIPPIN 입덕 미로, 나가시는 출구는 없습니다)	Drippin	April 8, 2024	Drippin member Joo Chang-uk is absent
15	Idol Radio Truck Has a Broken Heart After Seeing Ampers&One~🛻 (앰퍼샌드원 보고 심장이 고장 난 아돌라 트럭~🛻)	Ampers&One	April 11, 2024	Special DJs: DKZ (Jaechan, Jonghyeong)
16	Bye, My ONF (안녕, 나의 온앤오프)	ONF	April 15, 2024	
17	KIOF Princesses, You've Been Waiting, We'll Serve You Properly🤵 (키오프 공주님들, 기다리고 있었습니다 제대로 모시겠습니다🤵)	Kiss of Life	April 17, 2024	
18	Hey~ I'll Order Young Posse in XXL Size🙋‍♂️ (저기요~ 영파씨 XXL 사이즈로 주문할게요🙋‍♂️)	Young Posse	April 22, 2024	
19	If You Collect Earth🌎Fire🔥Wind🌪 It's #BoyNextDoor🚪 (땅🌎불🔥바람🌪을 모으면 #보이넥스트도어🚪)	BoyNextDoor	April 24, 2024	
20	Idol Radio is ✨ Super Attracted✨ to Illit🧲 (아돌라는 ✨아일릿✨에게 Super 이끌림🧲)	Illit	April 29, 2024	
21	It's Been A While with Younite... A Year (Hanhae) or Two (유나이트와 함께한 지 어느덧... 한해 두해)	Younite	May 1, 2024	Special DJ: Hanhae
22	What Kind of Combination is Sunwoo & Jihoon?😎 (선우&지훈 이 조합 어떤디?😎)	Jihoon (Treasure)	May 6, 2024	
23	Spring Day Mini Concert with Onewe🌸 (원위와 함께하는 봄날의 미니콘서트🌸)	Onewe	May 8, 2024	
24	96 Chemi Camp in Idol Radio (96케미캠프 in 아돌라)	Lee Jin-hyuk; Kim Jae-hwan	May 13, 2024	
25	Hey, You Guys are T? (야, 너희 T야?)	TOZ; TIOT	May 15, 2024	Special DJs: ONF (E-Tion, Seungjun)
26	Teacher Ddun and Twelve Disciples🏫 (떤 교생쌤과 열두 제자🏫)	TripleS (Yoon Seo-yeon, Lee Ji-woo, Kim Soo-min, Kim Na-kyoung, Seo Da-hyun, Kotone, Kwak Yeon-ji, Xinyu, Lynn, Joobin, Kim Chae-won, Jiyeon)	May 20, 2024	
27	Paradise K-pop Experience with La Poem🎙️ (라포엠이 말아주는 극락 케이팝 체험🎙️)	La Poem	May 22, 2024	
28	All Generations Gather Under Oneus!!🫡 (원어스 밑으로 전 세대 집합!!🫡)	Oneus	May 27, 2024	Special DJ: ONF (E-Tion, Seungjun)
29	Beep Beep! This is JD1's Error🚨 (삐빅! JD1의 오류입니다🚨)	JD1 (Jeong Dong-won)	May 29, 2024	
30	Dxmon... To Meet DolRang❤️‍🔥 (다이몬... 돌랑이를 만나다❤️‍🔥)	Dxmon	June 3, 2024	Special DJ: New (The Boyz)
31	Archery Minjok, Ordering X10!💘 (양궁의 민족, X10 주문!💘)	MCND	June 5, 2024	
32	[Breaking News] King Kong 🦍Appeared on🦍 Idol Radio🚨 ([속보] 아돌라에 🦍킹콩🦍 출몰🚨)	Treasure	June 10, 2024	
33	'Shooting Star' That is More Thrilling🍦Than 31 Types of Ice Cream (31가지 아이스크림🍦보다 짜릿한 ‘슈팅스타’)	Kep1er	June 12, 2024	
34	5th Generation Power Idol Kim Jun-su Appears on Idol Radio👼🏻 (5세대 파워아이돌 김준수 아돌라 등장👼🏻)	XIA	June 17, 2024	Special DJs: Cravity (Jungmo, Wonjin)
35	Zombie Walking Over the Chilly Idol Radio🧟‍♀ (오싹한 아돌라 위로 좀비가 걸어 다닙니다🧟‍♀)	Everglow	June 19, 2024	Special DJ: Ju Hak-nyeon (The Boyz)
36	Badder Love is also Love💚 (Badder Love도 Love다💚)	Evnne	June 24, 2024	
37	Let It Burn D-DAY❤️‍🔥 (뜨거워지자 D-DAY❤️‍🔥)	H1-Key	June 26, 2024	
38	Every Day We Spent Together is a Glorious Day✨ (우리가 함께 한 모든 날이 Glorious Day✨)	Kim Jae-joong	July 1, 2024	Special DJ: Ju Hak-nyeon (The Boyz)
39	Hip Hop's Dad Epik High, Idol Radio's Child Kim Sun-woo (힙합의 애비 에픽하이, 아돌라의 애기 김선우)	Epik High	July 3, 2024	
40	Not Freeze Tag But STAYC C.I.T! (얼음땡 말고 스테이씨 치.아.땡!)	STAYC	July 8, 2024	Special DJs: ONF (E-Tion, Seungjun)
41	She's a Vampire But She's a Hot Girl (뱀파이어지만 핫걸입니다)	Lee Chae-yeon	July 10, 2024	Special DJs: ONF (E-Tion, Seungjun)
—	Idol Radio Super Rookies Vol.1	H1-Key; Ampers&One	July 15, 2024	Pre-recorded on May 4, 2024
42	Ddun DJ Vacation Ceremony - Idol Radio is Open as Usual (떤디 방학식 - 아돌라 정상영업합니다)	—N/a	July 17, 2024	
43	Monday to Sunday Lights On with Weeekly!💡 (월화수목금토일 위클리와 Lights On!💡)	Weeekly	July 22, 2024	Special DJs: ONF (E-Tion, Seungjun)
44	[Breaking] Goblins (Shock) Appeared at Sangam [News] 😈 ([속] 상암에 도깨비 출몰 [보] 😈)	All(H)Ours	July 24, 2024	Special DJs: ONF (E-Tion, Seungjun)
45	Salute! Sergeant Ha is Ordered to Comeback 🫡 (충성! 하병장 컴백을 명 받았습니다🫡)	Ha Sung-woon	July 29, 2024	Special DJs: ONF (E-Tion, Seungjun)
46	GungDJSsuriDJ's Lucky Seven 🍀 Happy 7th Anniversary to ONF 🥳 (궁디쓰리디의 럭키세븐🍀 온앤오프 7주년 축하해🥳)	—N/a	July 31, 2024	Special DJs: ONF (E-Tion, Seungjun); Originally with U (ONF) as guest, he would be absent due to health reasons, and the episode would proceed with only the DJs
47	Our Password is SUPER ROOKIES😉 (우리의 암호는 SUPER ROOKIES😉)	Pow	August 5, 2024	Special DJs: Tempest (Hanbin, Lew)
48	Handsome + Handsome = The CrewOne (잘생김 + 잘생김 = 더크루원)	The CrewOne (Note: Project boy group that consists of all ATBO members and all Just B members (minus Siwoo))	August 7, 2024	Special DJs: Cravity (Jungmo, Wonjin)
49	What Perfume to Use in the Summer? Scent of Rescene🌿 (여름에 향수 뭐 쓰세요? 리센느 향이요🌿)	Rescene	August 12, 2024	Special DJs: Cravity (Jungmo, Wonjin)
50	We Are Handsome Tomatoz🍅 (우리는 멋쟁이 토마토즈🍅)	—N/a	August 14, 2024	Special DJs: Cravity (Jungmo, Wonjin)
51	Reply 2012🚨 (응답하라 2012🚨)	Bang & Jung & Yoo & Moon	August 19, 2024	Special DJs: B1A4 (CNU, Sandeul)
52	Comeback Grand Feast in Idol Radio🎊 (컴백 대잔치 in 아돌라🎊)	Drippin	August 21, 2024	Special DJ: Moonbyul (Mamamoo)
53	Broken Hearts Club (BHC), SF9's Comeback (뽀개진 심장 클럽 (BHC), SF9의 컴백)	SF9	August 26, 2024	Special DJs: Cravity (Jungmo, Wonjin); SF9 members Jaeyoon, Dawon and Zuho are absent
—	Idol Radio X LuckyFes24	Kang Ji-young (Kara); Xdinary Heroes; Kiss of Life; N.SSign	August 28, 2024	Pre-recorded on July 14–15, 2024
54	Our Own Classified Story, Girls' Night🌙 (우리만의 기밀 이야기, 걸스나잇🌙)	Oh My Girl (Mimi, Seunghee, Yubin)	September 2, 2024	Special DJs: TripleS (Yoon Seo-yeon, Lee Ji-woo)
55	ARrC? We're Babies~🐣 (아크? 아가라고요~🐣)	ARrC	September 4, 2024	Special DJs: TripleS (Kim Na-kyoung, Nien)
56	Run 🚐OFF ROAD🚐 with Onewe (원위랑 🚐OFF ROAD🚐를 달려)	Onewe	September 9, 2024	Special DJs: TripleS (Yoon Seo-yeon, Lee Ji-woo)
57	Idol Radio's Current Location (Witch) is, xikers Over💖 (아돌라 현재 위치는, 싸이커스다 오바💖)	Xikers	September 11, 2024	Special DJs: TripleS (Yoon Seo-yeon, Lee Ji-woo)
58	Chuseok Special! Foreign Idols' Confessions (추석 특집! 외국인 아이돌의 고백)	Aria (X:IN); Yorch (Pow); Brian (Ampers&One); Ayako (Genblue)	September 16, 2024	Special DJ: Keita (Evnne)
59	Parents Can Watch (Not Dangerous) When Together with BoyNextDoor (보넥도와 함께라면 부모님 관람가능)	BoyNextDoor	September 18, 2024	Special DJs: BoyNextDoor (Sungho, Riwoo)
60	B1Harmony (비원하모니)	P1Harmony	September 23, 2024	Special DJs: B1A4 (CNU, Sandeul)
61	ROAD TO IDOL RADIO	Younite	September 25, 2024	Special DJs: B1A4 (CNU, Sandeul)
62	TIOT Comeback Check! (TIOT 컴백 Check!)	TIOT	October 2, 2024	Special DJ: Keita (Evnne)
63	It's Me FIFTY FIFTY🖤 (나야 FIFTY FIFTY🖤)	Fifty Fifty	October 7, 2024	
64	Ddun DJ's School Opening Ceremony🏫 (떤디의 개학식🏫)	—N/a	October 9, 2024	
65	Wind High School Dance Club (바람고 댄스동아리)	The Wind	October 14, 2024	Special DJ: Q (The Boyz)
66	Made in MADEIN	Madein	October 16, 2024	
67	🍬Billlie's Remembrance Candy Shop Opens!🍬 (🍬Billlie의 기억사탕 가게 오픈!🍬)	Billlie	October 21, 2024	
68	Idol's Fundamentals, Kim Jae-joong & Kim Jun-su (JX) (아이돌의 근본, 김재중&김준수 (JX))	JX (Kim Jae-joong, Kim Jun-su)	October 23, 2024	
69	High-performance (Performante) Dance Dimension is Here🖐 (고성능 댄스 디멘션이 온다🖐)	TripleS Visionary Vision	October 28, 2024	Special DJs: TripleS (Kim Yoo-yeon, Kim Na-kyoung)
70	Ddun DJ and 10 Pax Ddun Friends' Gathering👥👥👥👥👥 (떤디와 10인의 떤프모임👥👥👥👥👥)	The Boyz	October 30, 2024	
71	AMPERS&ONE + DolRang = Idol Radio (AMPERS&ONE + 돌랑이 = 아이돌라디오)	Ampers&One	November 4, 2024	Special Co-DJ: Jihoon (Treasure)
72	🗣GPT! Who is DolRang's Unrequited Love? 💬STAYC (🗣GPT! 돌랑이의 짝사랑은 누구야? 💬STAYC)	STAYC	November 6, 2024	Special Co-DJ: Jihoon (Treasure)
73	Shhh 🤫 VIVIZ Appears with Force 😎 (쉿 🤫 VIVIZ 힘차게 등장 😎)	Viviz	November 11, 2024	
74	Kep1er is Running Towards Here at the Speed of TIPI-TAP ┗(^o^)┓三 (Kep1er가 TIPI-TAP하는 속도로 달려왔습니다 ┗(^o^)┓三)	Kep1er	November 13, 2024	Kep1er member Seo Young-eun is absent
75	Live Craftsmen' Special : Stealing DolRang's Heart (라이브 장인 특 : 돌랑이 마음 훔침)	Jamie; Bang Ye-dam; Kik5o	November 18, 2024	Special DJ: Kevin (The Boyz)
76	Let's Introduce, DolRang's New boyfriend (시켜줘, 돌랑이의 New boyfriend)	Pow	November 20, 2024	
77	Meovv is Walking Over the Solidly Frozen Idol Radio🐈 (꽁꽁 얼어붙은 아돌라 위로 미야오가 걸어다닙니다🐈)	Meovv	November 25, 2024	
78	Hold the ZOOM BADVILLAIN 😈 (숨 참고 BADVILLAIN 😈)	Badvillain	November 27, 2024	
79	WHO DAT GIRL IS? Izna! (WHO DAT GIRL IS? 이즈나!)	Izna	December 2, 2024	Special DJs: Oneus (Seoho, Keonhee)
80	🎅🏻Ddun-ta Claus' Surprise Attack🎅🏻 (🎅🏻떤타클로스의 습격🎅🏻)	—N/a	December 4, 2024	
81	Youths' Holiday Party🥳 (청춘들의 홀리데이 파티🥳)	Epex	December 9, 2024	Epex member Keum is absent
82	WayV's Frequency is 91.9 Mhz (WayV의 Frequency 는 91.9 MHz)	WayV	December 11, 2024	WayV member Winwin is absent
83	Idol Radio's a T? Yeah, Cravity~ (아돌라 T야? 응, 크래비티~)	Cravity	December 16, 2024	
84	K-POP Treasure No. 82 ✨82MAJOR✨ (K-POP 보물 제82호 ✨82MAJOR✨)	82Major	December 18, 2024	
85	Let's Get It with NOWADAYS📢 (NOWADAYS와 렛츠기릿📢)	Nowadays	December 23, 2024	
—	Idol Radio Super Rookies Vol.2	All(H)Ours; Pow	December 25, 2024	Pre-recorded on August 25, 2024
—	2024 Idol Radio Year-end Settlement (2024 아이돌라디오 연말결산)	—N/a	December 30, 2024	Cancelled in light of the Jeju Air Flight 2216 accident

== Episodes (Season 4 - 2025) ==
List of episodes (Season 4 episode 86-185)

Note: Eric (The Boyz) has joined the official DJ lineup beginning episode 90, with Eric hosting the Monday shows (or first show of the week) and Sunwoo hosting the Wednesday shows (or second show of the week).
Note 2: In episodes that Sunwoo or Eric did not appear, special DJ(s) would stand in for them when applicable, as listed in the remarks section.
Note 3: No shows on March 3 and 5 in lieu of the "Idol Radio Live in Macau" concert held on March 1–2.
Note 4: No show on December 8 in lieu of the "Super Vibe Korea" concert held on December 6–7.
Note 5: No shows on December 29 and 31 due to construction works around the studio.

Episode #	Episode Title	Guest(s)	Broadcast Date	Remark(s)
—	Idol Radio Live in Tokyo - Shining Moments	Kang Ji-young (Kara); Yesung (Super Junior); Onew (Shinee); Taisei Fukumoto; Moonbyul (Mamamoo); Ballistik Boyz from Exile Tribe; Mave: Octpath	January 5, 2025	Pre-recorded on September 28, 2024
86	Happy New Year! and Happy like CLASS:y 🥳 (해피뉴이어! and 해피 like CLASS:y 🥳)	Classy	January 6, 2025	Special DJs: Oneus (Seoho, Xion); Classy member Chaewon is absent
87	🎊 Congratulations All Adult Members Group BND 🎊 (🎊 축 전원 성인 그룹 보넥도 🎊)	BoyNextDoor	January 8, 2025	
88	DolRang's Monday Blues Remedy, Roommate Main Vocalz💊💛 (돌랑이의 월요병 치료제, 룸메보즈💊💛)	—N/a	January 13, 2025	Special DJs: Oneus (Seoho, Keonhee)
89	Shining Lights with the Dazzling Shining Oneus (눈부시게 빛나는 원어스와 Shining Lights)	Oneus	January 15, 2025	
90	Starting Pitcher Eric, Gets a Shutout at Idol Radio! ⚾ (선발투수 에릭, 아돌라에서 완봉승을 거둡니다! ⚾)	—N/a	January 20, 2025	First episode with Eric (The Boyz) as permanent DJ; Special guest appearance by Younghoon (The Boyz)
91	BB Girls Seniors! Get Close with Eric Junior🍚🩷 (브브걸 선배님! 에릭 후배랑 친해져요🍚🩷)	BB Girls	January 22, 2025	Eric stood in for Sunwoo as DJ, who is absent
92	KickFlip💙Become the Pillar of JYP‼️ (킥플립💙JYP의 기둥이 되거라‼️)	KickFlip	January 27, 2025	Special DJ: Ju Hak-nyeon (The Boyz)
93	2024 Idol Radio Year-end Settlement (2024 아이돌라디오 연말결산)	—N/a	January 30, 2025	Broadcast would begin at 14:00 (KST)
94	Sangam-dong ‘CIX’ Thunderstorm Alert⚡🌀 (상암동 ‘CIX’ 천둥번개주의보⚡🌀)	CIX	February 3, 2025	
95	[Scoop] Plave Asterum Server Has Been Hacked! ([특종] 플레이브 아스테룸 서버 해킹당함!)	Plave	February 5, 2025	Broadcast would be proceeded privately
96	Eric DJ's Real.Friend.Introduction✨Introducing Mark Hyung (에디의 찐.친.소✨마크 형을 소개합니다💚)	Mark (Got7)	February 10, 2025	
97	Ddun DJ & All(H)Ours Rock Festival (a.k.a Doljanchi🪨🎉) (떤디&올아워즈 Rock Festival (a.k.a 돌잔치🪨🎉))	All(H)Ours	February 12, 2025	
98	Rescene's Growth Diary✍💕 (리센느의 성장일지✍💕)	Rescene	February 17, 2025	Special DJs: P1Harmony (Jiung, Intak)
99	Evnne's Comeback is Ripening Evnne-ly (이븐의 컴백이 이븐하게 익었군요)	Evnne	February 19, 2025	Special DJs: Evnne (Keita, Ji Yun-seo); Evnne member Yoo Seung-eon is absent
100	Welcome to Idol Radio Stranger🚪 (아돌라에 방문을 환영하오 낯선이여🚪)	ONF	February 24, 2025	Special DJs: ONF (E-Tion, Seungjun)
101	My Heart Keeps Going Towards Madein💖 Run and See🏃‍♀ (마음이 자꾸만 메이딘에게💖 달려가 보래🏃‍♀)	Madein (Mashiro, MiU, Suhye, Nagomi)	February 26, 2025	
102	Eric DJ's Counselling Center, 'Ssohn Got Concerns?'🤓 (에디의 고민 상담소, ‘고민있쏜?’🤓)	—N/a	March 10, 2025	
103	DolRang's Spring is Treasure🌼 (돌랑이의 봄은 트레저🌼)	Treasure	March 12, 2025	
104	Even DolRang Shouts SAY MY NAME‼️ (돌랑이도 외쳐 SAY MY NAME‼️)	Say My Name	March 17, 2025	Special DJs: ONF (E-Tion, Seungjun)
105	Handsome is Ctrl+C+VVV=The Boyz🕶️ (잘생김을 Ctrl+C+VVV=더보이즈🕶️)	The Boyz	March 19, 2025	Sunwoo and Eric would co-host this episode The Boyz member Sangyeon is absent
106	Break Through Worries and BEBE with STAYC💖 (걱정 뚫고 짱테이씨와 BEBE💖)	STAYC	March 24, 2025	
107	It's Rude, But My Heart is Pure Love for Onewe💕 (무례하긴, 원위를 향한 마음은 순애야💕)	Onewe	March 26, 2025	
108	XDZ Boom is Here🤘✨ (엑디즈 붐은 온다🤘✨)	Xdinary Heroes	March 31, 2025	
109	A Clear LOVE LINE Between Idol Radio and NiziU〰️💖 (아돌라와 니쥬 사이 선명한 LOVE LINE〰️💖)	NiziU	April 2, 2025	
110	🎉Idol Radio Congratulates KiiiKiii on their Debut🎉 (🎉아돌라는 키키의 데뷔를 축하해🎉)	KiiiKiii	April 7, 2025	
111	Only One Prince The Wind Idol Radio Visit🎇 (온리원 왕자님 더윈드 아돌라 행차🎇)	The Wind	April 9, 2025	
112	Izna and Idol Radio's SECRET SIGN ✍️ (이즈나와 아돌라만의 SECRET SIGN ✍️)	Izna	April 14, 2025	Izna member Yoon Ji-yoon is absent
113	Tempest's Appearance Makes DolRang's Heart Unfreeze 🧊❤️‍🔥 (템자들의 등장에 돌랑이 심장 언프리즈 🧊❤️‍🔥)	Tempest	April 16, 2025	Special DJs: Cravity (Jungmo, Wonjin)
114	With Ampers&One‼️ Idol Radio Corporation 🌆 🌸Spring Season Workshop🌸 (앰퍼샌드원과 함께하는‼️ 돌라상사 🌆 🌸춘계워크숍🌸)	Ampers&One	April 21, 2025	
115	What You Looking At (Takeover)? 👀 We're 82Major! (뭘 봐? 👀우리 82메이저야!)	82Major	April 23, 2025	
116	Hey DolRang, Love CHUU🫶💕 (돌랑아, CHUU랑해🫶💕)	Chuu	April 28, 2025	
117	HITGS' Debut Diary Written Together with Idol Radio✍️💕 (아돌라와 함께 쓰는 힛지스의 데뷔 일지✍️💕)	HITGS	April 30, 2025	Special DJs: Cravity (Jungmo, Wonjin)
118	Today is Children's Day, if'eye' World!🧒👧 (오늘은 어린이 날, 이프‘아이’세상!🧒👧)	Ifeye	May 5, 2025	Special DJ: Younghoon (The Boyz)
119	My Heart is Fifty Fifty! Pookie Pookie❤️❣️ (심장이 핖티핖티! Pookie Pookie❤️❣️)	Fifty Fifty	May 7, 2025	Fifty Fifty member Keena is absent
120	[Exclusive] P1Harmony 'On Strike"? Shocking!🫢 ([단독] 피원하모니 ‘파업’? 충격!🫢)	P1Harmony	May 12, 2025	Special DJ: Kevin (The Boyz)
121	Dosirak is also Rock, Younite Rock Steady is also Rock🤟🏻 (도시락도 락이고 유나이트 Rock Steady도 락이다🤟🏻)	Younite	May 14, 2025	Special DJ: Kevin (The Boyz)
122	Attention‼️X:IN Makes💥Sudden.Appearance.on.Idol.Radio💥 (Attention‼️엑신 아돌라💥전.격.출.연💥)	X:IN	May 19, 2025	
123	'Wake Up' (Are You Alive), It's tripleS...! 😎 ('깨어' 나세요, 트리플에스여...! 😎)	TripleS (Yoon Seo-yeon, Kim Chae-yeon, Kim Na-kyoung, Gong Yu-bin, Seo Da-hyun, Kotone, Park So-hyun, Xinyu, Mayu, Joobin, Kim Chae-won, Sullin)	May 21, 2025	
124	Jae-Jjang+Jjong-Bear+Idol Radio = Happiness💖 (재짱+쫑곰+아돌라 = 행복💖)	DKZ (Jaechan, Jonghyeong)	May 26, 2025	
125	🍅The Good Brothers Who Raided the Tomatoz Garden (🍅토마토즈 텃밭을 습격한 의좋은 형제들)	Cravity (Allen, Minhee, Taeyoung, Seongmin)	May 28, 2025	Special DJs: Cravity (Jungmo, Wonjin)
126	9 Years of Experience, New Employees UAU's Attitudes = Perfect🔥 (경력 9년차, 신입사원 유아유의 에티튜드 = 완벽🔥)	UAU	June 2, 2025	
127	Flip now! Idol Radio's Today is Kickflip🧊 (Flip now! 아돌라의 오늘 하루는 킥플립🧊)	KickFlip	June 4, 2025	
128	[Idol Radio Summer Festival] Performance D-Day❗ ([아돌라 썸머 페스티벌] 공연 D-Day❗)	Jung Seung-hwan; Jeong Se-woon; Lee Mu-jin	June 9, 2025	
129	Lips Hips Kiss😘 Dance Dance Dance with KIOF💃 (립스 힙스 키스😘 키오프와 댄스 댄스 댄스 💃)	Kiss of Life	June 11, 2025	
130	Be The One! The Time When Idol Radio and Double 0ne Become One🎉 (Be The One! 더블원과 아돌라가 하나가 된 시간🎉)	Double 0ne (Note: Project boy group that consists of all BAE173 members (minus J-Min and Hangyul) and Fantasy Boys members Kang Min-seo, Lee Han-bin, Ling Qi, Hikaru and Hong Sung-min)	June 16, 2025	
131	🚨BEEP!🚨What To Do? I Think My Heart is Broken Because of Izna,, (🚨BEEP!🚨어떡하죠? 이즈나 때문에 내 심장이 고장났나봐,,)	Izna	June 18, 2025	Special DJs: Evnne (Lee Jeong-hyeon, Yoo Seung-eon); Izna member Yoon Ji-yoon is absent Broadcast would begin at 21:30 (KST)
132	Heartbeat Thump Thump‼️Idol Radio is Now Focusing on Uspeer‼️ (심장 소린 쿵쿵‼️아돌라는 지금 유스피어에 집중‼️)	Uspeer	June 23, 2025	Special DJs: Kiss of Life (Julie, Belle)
133	Meeting of Kiiras and Idol Radio🫶 Tingling⚡ (키라스와 아돌라의 만남🫶 찌릿찌릿해⚡)	Kiiras	June 25, 2025	Special DJs: Evnne (Lee Jeong-hyeon, Mun Jung-hyun)
134	🍇Cravity Grape Farm Opening Ceremony 🍇🎊 (🍇크래비티네 포도 농장 개업식 🍇🎊)	Cravity	June 30, 2025	
135	Oneus x Idol Radio = Harulala😇 (원어스 x 아돌라 = 하룰라라😇)	Oneus	July 2, 2025	Oneus member Seoho is absent
136	AHOF, Let's Rendezvous at Idol Radio🥰 (아홉, 아돌라에서 만나기로 해🥰)	AHOF	July 7, 2025	
137	Illit Makes Idol Radio Sweet and Sour... 😘❣️ (아일릿은 아돌라를 새콤달콤하게 해... 😘❣️)	Illit	July 9, 2025	
138	🦋Idol Radio La La Loves Viviz🦋 (🦋 아돌La La Loves 비비지 🦋)	Viviz	July 14, 2025	
139	❄️Snowing Heavily in Idol Radio #CYE is Coming Down Now This Moment❄️👻 (❄️아돌라에 펑펑 #클유아 가 내려와 지금 이 순간❄️👻)	Close Your Eyes	July 16, 2025	
140	BDC is Good ✌️What Do You Want Me to Do✌️ (BDC가 좋은데 ✌️어쩌라고요✌️)	Baby Dont Cry	July 21, 2025	
141	It's Embarrassing to Run Away, But You Can Go to Youngjae💚 (도망치는 건 부끄럽지만 영재한테는 가도 됨💚)	Youngjae (Got7)	July 23, 2025	Special DJ: New (The Boyz)
142	🚨Nowz = State of Excessive Wild Beauty🚨 (🚨나우즈 = 야성미 과잉 상태🚨)	Nowz	July 28, 2025	Special DJs: Evnne (Keita, Park Han-bin)
143	Hyunjae & Juyeon are the Presents🎁From Heaven (현재&주연은 선물입니다🎁하늘이 내려준)	The Boyz (Hyunjae, Juyeon)	July 30, 2025	Sunwoo and Eric would co-host this episode
144	[Breaking News] WL Union All Out Dispatch on Idol Radio! ([속보] WL유니언 아돌라 전격 출동!)	Jang Dong-woo (Infinite); Ryu Su-jeong	August 4, 2025	Special DJs: Lee Jang-jun (Golden Child), Lee Mi-joo
145	Idol Radio Likes Evnne... How Can I Do?❣️ (아돌라는 이븐이 좋은데... How Can I Do?❣️)	Evnne	August 6, 2025	Special DJs: Evnne (Lee Jeong-hyeon, Yoo Seung-eon)
146	Drowning with Idol Radio in 'I Love You' by SMN 🏊 (세마넴이 만든 ‘사랑해’ 에서 아돌라와 어푸어푸🏊)	Say My Name	August 11, 2025	Special DJs: TripleS (Yoon Seo-yeon, Kim Chae-yeon)
147	Romance of a Summer Night that Idol Radio and Dragon Pony Share🎸 (아돌라와 드래곤포니가 함께 쓰는 여름밤의 낭만🎸)	Dragon Pony	August 13, 2025	
148	Happy that ✨Idntt✨ and Idol Radio Meet💖 (✨아이덴티티✨와 아돌라의 만남 기쁘다💖)	Idntt (Note: As of the date of the broadcast, the full group consisted of members of the group's sub-unit unevermet: Kim Do-hun, Kim Hee-ju, Choi Tae-in, Lee Jae-young, Kim Ju-ho, Nam Ji-woon and Lee Hwan-hee.)	August 18, 2025	Idntt member Hwangbo Mingyeol is absent
149	AtHeart's Wingbeats, the Butterfly Effect that Will Happen in Idol Radio🦋 (앳하트의 날갯짓, 아돌라에서 일어날 나비효과🦋)	AtHeart	August 20, 2025	AtHeart member Aurora is absent
150	🚨When the Limitless Ampers&One Comes to Idol Radio, a Jam Concert is Born🚨 (🚨한계 없는 앰퍼샌드원이 아돌라에 오면, 잼컨이 탄생한다🚨)	Ampers&One	August 26, 2025	
151	Kep1er Brand Iron Taste is Really Good..🖤 (케플러 표 쇠맛 이거 많이 좋은 거였네..🖤)	Kep1er	August 27, 2025	Eric stood in for Sunwoo as DJ, who is absent Kep1er member Seo Young-eun is absent
152	This is In A Minute's Way This is how we do 🕐 (이게 인어미닛 방식이야 This is how we do 🕐)	In A Minute	September 2, 2025	
153	Even If It Collides, Even If It Breaks Idol Radio Will Be with 8Turn💘 (부딪힌다 해도, 부서진다 해도 아돌라는 에잇턴에게💘)	8Turn	September 3, 2025	Special DJ: Q (The Boyz)
154	We Miss You, Eric DJ! 🐶 Always remember, Eric DJ Loves DolRang♥️ (보고싶어, 에디! 🐶 Always remember, 에디 Loves 돌랑이♥️)	—N/a	September 8, 2025	
155	All the Time Spent with All(H)Ours and Idol Radio is Good💖 (올아워즈와 아돌라가 함께한 모든 시간이 좋았다💖)	All(H)Ours	September 10, 2025	Special DJ: New (The Boyz)
156	The Protagonists are Badvillain! 🎬Genre is THRILLER‼️ (주인공은 배드빌런! 🎬장르는 THRILLER‼️)	Badvillain	September 15, 2025	Special DJs: Artms (Heejin, Jinsoul)
157	X:IN's RRRUN Can't Be Stopped by Anything🏃‍♀️ (웬만해선 엑신의 RRRUN을 막을 수 없다🏃‍♀️)	X:IN	September 17, 2025	Special DJs: Cravity (Wonjin, Hyeongjun)
158	Band AxMxP First Idol Radio Entrance! Popcorn Preparation Required🍿 (밴드 에이엠피 첫 아돌라 입성! 팝콘 준비 필수🍿)	AxMxP	September 22, 2025	Special DJs: Onewe (Yonghoon, Dongmyeong)
159	Go Go💪 Idol Radio Cheerful Sports Day 🎊 (으쌰으쌰 💪아돌라 명랑 운동회 🎊)	Lun8; TIOT	September 24, 2025	Special DJ: Lee Jang-jun (Golden Child)
160	Protagonists of Youth Comic KickFlip's Appearance on Idol Radio..❣️ (아돌라에 청춘만화 주인공 킥플립의 등장이라..❣️)	KickFlip	September 29, 2025	KickFlip member Amaru is absent
161	Idid! Why Are You So Radiant (Chan-Ran) in Your Way? It's Dazzling✨ (아이딧! 왜 제멋대로 찬란한 거야? 눈부시잖아✨)	Idid	October 1, 2025	
162	Eric's Idol Playlist (에릭의 아이돌 플레이리스트)	—N/a	October 11, 2025	Only listenable
163	Idol Radio📢 Ddun DJ and DolRang, Do Whatever You Want❣️ (아돌라📢 떤디랑 돌랑이, 하고 싶은 거 다 해❣️)	—N/a	October 9, 2025	
164	Idol Radio is HAPPY When with HITGS☘️ (아돌라는 힛지스랑 있으면 HAPPY해☘️)	HITGS	October 13, 2025	
165	Mamma Mia🚨Izna time that is More Cinematic than a Movie! (Mamma Mia🚨영화보다 더 영화같은 이즈나 time!)	Izna	October 15, 2025	
166	Love is Onewe💕 Your First 1st Place💕 Can't be Forgotten Right🎵 (사랑은요 원위💕 당신의 첫 1위💕 절대로 잊지 못하죠🎵)	Onewe	October 20, 2025	
167	Heart Thumps💗TWS Has Confessed to DolRang! (심장이 쿵💗투어스가 돌랑이한테 고백한대!)	TWS	October 22, 2025	
168	[Eric and Jinyoung] Pretty Boys' Friendship Blooming in Idol Radio❣️ ([에릭과 진영] 아돌라에서 피어난 미남들의 우정❣️)	Bae Jin-young	October 27, 2025	
169	Ready, Camera! BND's movie Unfolding in Idol Radio🎬 (Ready, Camera! 아돌라에서 펼쳐지는 보넥도의 movie🎬)	BoyNextDoor	October 29, 2025	
170	82M✨ You are Idol Radio's Trophy...❤🏆 (에투메✨ 네가 아돌라 트로피다...❤🏆)	82Major	November 3, 2025	
171	DKB : dance with me Idol Radio : Yes😘 (다크비 : dance with me 아돌라 : 녜😘)	DKB	November 5, 2025	Special DJs: DKB (D1, Heechan); DKB member Lune is absent
172	Friend of Idol Radio Come Out. They're Here. ARrC Has Arrived☆ (아돌라 친구 나와라. 나왔다. 아크 등장☆)	ARrC	November 10, 2025	
173	🎊HaNuLiz Powerful Idol Radio Debut🎊 (🎊하누리즈 힘차게 아돌라 데뷔🎊)	Chuei Liyu; Jang Han-eum; Kang Woo-jin	November 12, 2025	
174	Idol Radio's ☃️WISH All Winter: Be Happy with INI (아돌라의 올 겨울 ☃️WISH: INI랑 행복하기)	INI	November 13, 2025	Special DJs: Evnne (Keita, Lee Jeong-hyeon)
175	Even If the World Falls Apart, Even If the Sun Breaks I Want to be Kang Seung-yoon💗 (세상이 무너진대도, 태양이 부서진대도 강승윤 할래💗)	Kang Seung-yoon (Winner)	November 17, 2025	
176	DolRang Likes Idol Radio with AHOF💗 (돌랑이는 아홉과의 아돌라를 좋아해💗)	AHOF	November 18, 2025	Special DJs: AHOF (Seo Jeong-woo, Cha Woong-ki); AHOF member Chih En is absent
177	Idol Radio Only Follows CYE's Heart⚒️ (아돌라는 오직 클유아의 맘을 따르지⚒️)	Close Your Eyes	November 19, 2025	Special DJ: Jeon Min-wook (Close Your Eyes)
178	Lucky Fifty Fifty! Appears on Idol Radio✌️✊✋ (행운의 피프티피프티! 아돌라에 등장✌️✊✋)	Fifty Fifty	November 24, 2025	Fifty Fifty member Hana is absent
179	Idol Radio Can't Stop Cravity Like Lemonade🍋 (아돌라는 크래비티를 멈출 수 없어 Like Lemonade🍋)	Cravity	November 26, 2025	
180	Idol Radio with msnz = SSS Grade Combination❤️ (아돌라 with 미소녀즈 = SSS급 조합❤️)	TripleS (Yoon Seo-yeon, Jeong Hye-rin, Gong Yu-bin, Seo Da-hyun, Park So-hyun, Xinyu, Jeong Ha-yeon, Sullin)	December 1, 2025	
181	Start of December✨ Very Very Good Verivery💘 (12월의 시작✨ 베리베리하다 베리베리한💘)	Verivery	December 3, 2025	Verivery members Hoyoung and Minchan are absent
182	The Brightest in the Entire Universe ✨YOU✨Chuei Liyu (온 우주에서 제일 빛나는 ✨YOU✨최립우)	Chuei Liyu	December 10, 2025	
183	A Midwinter ICE LUV STORY with NTX💌 (NTX와 함께 쓰는 한겨울의 ICE LUV STORY💌)	NTX	December 15, 2025	
184	XLOV Who Showed Love, Came to Pick Up DolRang♥️ (사랑을 보여준 XLOV, 돌랑이를 데리러 왔어♥️)	Xlov	December 17, 2025	Special DJs: SF9 (Inseong, Youngbin)
185	Birthday Boy 🎂Eric DJ Birthday Party 🎂 (벌쓰데이뽀이 🎂에디 생일 파티 🎂)	—N/a	December 22, 2025	

== Episodes (Season 4 - 2026) ==
List of episodes (Season 4 episode 186-present)

Note: In episodes that Sunwoo or Eric did not appear, special DJ(s) would stand in for them when applicable, as listed in the remarks section.
Note 2: Beginning July 1, there would be only one episode every week.
Note 3: No show on September 23.
Note 4: No shows on November 4 and 11 due to construction works around the studio.

Episode #	Episode Title	Guest(s)	Broadcast Date	Remark(s)
186	It's Okay If the World is Not Like a Movie! If H1-Key is Here🎬 (세상은 영화 같지 않아도 괜찮아! 하이키가 있다면🎬)	H1-Key	January 5, 2026	
187	Girls' Night on ATTENT!ON to the SayMyName Girls🌙 (세이마이네임 소녀들에게 ATTENT!ON 하는 걸스나잇🌙)	Say My Name	January 7, 2026	Special DJs: Fifty Fifty (Keena, Chanelle Moon)
188	Idntt~ Could You Explain What 'Pretty Boy Swag" is? 👥 yesweare (아덴이들~ 'Pretty Boy Swag'이 뭔지 설명해 줄 수 있어? 👥 yesweare)	Idntt (Note: As of the date of the broadcast, the full group consisted of members of the group's sub-units Uneverm8t and Yesw8are. Only the unit Yesw8are would appear in this episode.)	January 12, 2026	
189	It's LNGSHOT 4SHO!!! Lngshot's Idol Radio Debut Show🎉 (It's LNGSHOT 4SHO!!! 롱샷 의 아돌라 데뷔쇼🎉)	Lngshot	January 14, 2026	
190	This is 00z's Friendship❣️ A Bustling Eric DJ's 1st Anniversary Party🥳 (이게 바로 빵빵즈의 우정❣️ 복작복작 에디 1주년 파티🥳)	Yoon San-ha (Astro); Jongho (Ateez); Choi Bo-min	January 19, 2026	
191	Alpha Drive One and Idol Radio's First Meeting, Heart Thumping Chapter One💞 (알파드라이브원과 아돌라의 첫 만남, 두근거리는 챕터원💞)	Alpha Drive One	January 21, 2026	Special DJs: Alpha Drive One (Junseo, Leo)
192	The Rookie Singer Who Grows in Idol Radio! The Voice of Inseong🎙️ (아돌라 속에서 커지는 신!인가수 인성 의 목소리🎙️)	Inseong (SF9)	January 26, 2026	
193	Idol Radio and Oneus Together Grenade Grenade Grenade💣 (아돌라랑 원어스 랑 다같이 Grenade Grenade Grenade💣)	Oneus	January 28, 2026	Special DJ: Keonhee (Oneus); Oneus member Seoho is absent
194	[Breaking News] Whib, Landed in Idol Radio with Unwavering Momentum💥 ([속보] 휘브, 흔들림 없는 기세로 아돌라에 상륙💥)	WHIB	February 2, 2026	
195	KiiiKiii: Catch Me if You Can🧢 Idol Radio: Let's Go Together~!💕 (키키:나잡아봐라🧢 아돌라:가취가욥~!💕)	KiiiKiii	February 4, 2026	
196	✈️The City that Young Posse Arrived with their VISA = Idol Radio (✈️영파씨가 VISA 들고 도착한 도시 = 아돌라)	Young Posse	February 9, 2026	
197	Hey DolRang, Do You Want to Meet Billlie at the Cloud Palace?☁️🏰 (돌랑아, 빌리랑 구름 궁전에서 만날래?☁️🏰)	Billlie	February 11, 2026	
198	Happy 🐰Liyu🐰 New Year! - Idol Radio (새해 🐰립우🐰 많이 받으세요! - 아돌라)	—N/a	February 18, 2026	Special DJ: Chuei Liyu
199	Eric's Idol Playlist (에릭의 아이돌 플레이리스트)	—N/a	February 21, 2026	Only listenable
200	The Love! bomb! in Idol Radio = Pow💥 (아돌라 맘속의 Love! bomb! = 파우💥)	Pow	February 23, 2026	
201	We Can Love Each Other Like There's No Tomorrow❤️ (우린 내일이 없듯이 사랑할 수도❤️)	—N/a	February 25, 2026	
202	The Night Has Come. DolRangs Please Raise Your Heads and Check on 8Turn😉 (밤이 되었습니다. 돌랑이들은 고개를 들어 에잇턴을 확인해주세요😉)	8Turn	March 2, 2026	
203	Today's Idol Radio Entry CODE 🗝️ Everglow💜 (오늘의 아돌라 입장 CODE 🗝️ 에버글로우💜)	Everglow	March 4, 2026	
204	It's Catch The Young Appearance at Idol Radio High School... It's Going to be a Storm🌪️ (아돌라고에 캐치더영의 등장이라.. 폭풍이 몰아치겠군🌪️)	Catch The Young	March 9, 2026	
205	What Day is Today? The Day When Tunexx Appears on Idol Radio for the First Time in Their Lives📅⏰ (오늘은 무슨 날? 튜넥스가 난생처음 아돌라에 나오는 날📅⏰)	Tunexx	March 11, 2026	
206	🚨[Warning] Agent Nouera, We're Off The Designated Mission For a While. (🚨[경고] 에이전트 누에라, 설계된 임무에서 잠시 벗어납니다.)	Nouera	March 16, 2026	
207	Thank You Idol Radio for Saving P1Harmony🙏 (피원하모니 아돌라를 구해주셔서 감사합니다🙏)	P1Harmony	March 18, 2026	
208	Early 01 Daehwi Appears! The Day of Organising the 00z Family Tree ✨ (빠른 01 대휘 등장! 빵빵즈 족보 정리의 날 ✨)	Lee Dae-hwi (AB6IX)	March 23, 2026	Special Co-DJ: Bae Jin-young
209	🦋 AtHeart is Turning the World Upside Down 🦋 (🦋 앳하트는 세상을 뒤집는 중 🦋)	AtHeart	March 26, 2026	AtHeart member Aurora is absent
210	Idol Radio's Ending Today is 🍒Love BDC🍒 (오늘 아돌라의 엔딩은 🍒베돈크 사랑해🍒)	Baby Dont Cry	March 30, 2026	Special DJs: Kiss of Life (Natty, Belle)
211	Con🎊Debut on Idol Radio as Rookie Singer Kangmin🎊Grats (경🎊신인가수 강민으로 아돌라 데뷔🎊축)	Kangmin (Verivery)	April 1, 2026	
212	It's the Perfect Day for DEAD MAN WALKING😈 With All(H)Ours❣️ (DEAD MAN WALKING 하기 딱 좋은 날이야😈 올아워즈와 함께❣️)	All(H)Ours	April 6, 2026	
213	🔥Santos Bravos' Hot Idol Radio Challenge🔥 (🔥산토스 브라보스의 뜨거운 아돌라 도전기🔥)	Santos Bravos	April 8, 2026	
214	Idol Radio Debut D-DAY🥳 Hello We Are KEYVITUP! (아돌라 데뷔 D-DAY🥳 안녕하세요 KEYVITUP입니다!)	Keyvitup	April 13, 2026	
215	Today's Idol Radio❣️ Endless Handsome Men Blessings…🖤 (오늘의 아돌라❣️ 미남들의 축복이 끝이 없네…🖤)	Jang Han-eum	April 15, 2026	Special DJs: WHIB (Kim Jun-min, Leejeong)
216	[Emergency] Looking for DolRang to Defy Fate with Plave(1/♾) ([긴급] 플레이브랑 운명을 거슬러 볼 돌랑이 구함(1/♾))	Plave	April 16, 2026	Broadcast would be proceeded privately
217	Met God-pers&One Young Masters at the Idol Radio Marketplace✨ (아돌라 저잣거리에서 만난 갓퍼샌드원 도령들✨)	Ampers&One	April 20, 2026	Special DJ: Lee Dae-hwi (AB6IX)
218	Coming on Idol Radio? This is Why Idol Radio Goes Crazy Over KickFlip😉 (아돌라 온다고? 이러니까 아돌라가 킥플립한테 돌아버리지😉)	KickFlip	April 22, 2026	Special DJ: Lee Dae-hwi (AB6IX)
219	With INI, DolRang's Heart Rate Skyrockets💗 (INI와 함께라면 돌랑이 심박수 급상승💗)	INI	April 27, 2026	Special DJ: Dongheon (Verivery)
220	🖤Come Here You've Waited for So Long? CYE Will Put an End to It💥 (🖤이리와 많이 기다렸지? 클유아가 종말해줄게💥)	Close Your Eyes	April 29, 2026	
221	'Hello' Naze Has Debuted Today ('안녕하세요' 네이즈 오늘 데뷔했습니다)	Naze	May 4, 2026	
222	Nexz Has Finally Appeared on Idol Radio~Mmchk🤭 (넥스지 드디어 아돌라 나왔음~츠크🤭)	Nexz	May 6, 2026	
223	A Rookie Group that Came to Put an Exclamation Mark on the World! Unchild🐸 (세상에 느낌표를 찍으러 온 신인 그룹! 언차일드🐸)	Unchild	May 11, 2026	
224	Idol Radio Calls Love TWS💙 (아돌라는 사랑을 투어스라 부르지💙)	TWS	May 13, 2026	
225	Hurry Up and Show 82M's Sign to Idol Radio💓 (어서 아돌라에게 보여줘 에투메의 Sign💓)	82Major	May 18, 2026	
226	Evnne Spitting Out (Backtalk) Unspoken Voices💥 (이븐이 뱉어낸 거침없는 목소리💥)	Evnne	May 20, 2026	
227	Woo Eh Woo Eh Oh♡ Woo Eh Woo Eh Oh♡ with Flare U and Idol Radio (플레어 유랑 아돌라랑 같이 우에우에오♡ 우에우에오♡)	Flare U	May 27, 2026	
228	Eric DJ + Yoon San-ha = Site of Too Many Handsome Men🫶 (에디 + 윤산하 = 미남 과다 현장🫶)	Yoon San-ha (Astro)	June 1, 2026	
229	Did You And2ble? Have You And2ble? I'm Asking If You And2ble?!!💥 (앤더블 했니? 앤더블 했어? 앤더블 했냐고?!!💥)	And2ble	June 3, 2026	
230	Idol Radio Already Likes This. Treasure's If I If I If I If I🤷🤷🤷 (아돌라는 이미 이걸 좋아해요. 트레저의 이파이파이파이파🤷🤷🤷)	Treasure	June 8, 2026	
231	Xlov, You Just Stabbed DolRang's Heart✨ (엑스러브, 넌 지금 돌랑이의 심장을 찔렀어✨)	Xlov	June 10, 2026	
232	[Idol Radio World Cup] The Appearances of Ten Heads of Xikers✨ ([아돌라 월드컵] 열 개의 머릴 맞댄 싸이커스의 등장✨)	Xikers	June 16, 2026	
233	Let's Promote Extensively #Jacob_SoloDebut_SlowDancing (크게 홍보합니다 #제이콥_솔로데뷔_슬로우댄싱)	Jacob (The Boyz)	June 17, 2026	
234	Warning⚠️ Epex Would Make Everyone 'Resonate'. (경고⚠️ 이펙스가 여러분을 '울림'니다.)	Epex	June 22, 2026	
235	The Time to Find Izna and Idol Radio's Own Rhythm🎧 (이즈나와 아돌라만의 리듬을 찾아가는 시간🎧)	Izna	June 24, 2026	
236	[Exclusive] 'Secret' Comeback After 12 Years🍨 Shocking Appearance at Idol Radio💖 ([속보] '시크릿' 12년만의 컴백🍨 아돌라 전격 출연💖)	Secret	July 1, 2026	
237	Focus💛 H2H Appears Tang on Idol Radio🍋 (집중💛 아돌라에 하투하 나옵니탱🍋)	Hearts2Hearts	July 8, 2026	
238	Anyone Who Likes Rescene?! You Too? Me Too? Idol Radio Too🩷 (리센느 좋아하는 사람?! 너도? 나도? 아돌라도🩷)	Rescene	July 15, 2026	
239	The Story of Vayonn's Beginning🍏 MUAH! (베이온의 첫 시작 이야기🍏 MUAH!)	Vayonn	July 22, 2026	
240	Hello?👟 Are You Saying Lun8 is Appearing on Idol Radio❓ (여보세요?👟 루네이트 아돌라 출연이라고요❓)	Lun8	July 29, 2026	Lun8 member Dohyun is absent
241	This Summer, Idol Radio Seeps into Pow🍉 (올여름, 아돌라는 파우에게 스며들어 가🍉)	Pow	August 5, 2026	
242	A SWEAT Summer Created by the Sun Named KIOF☀️ (키오프라는 태양이 만든 SWEAT한 여름☀️)	Kiss of Life	August 12, 2026	
243	DEBUT D-DAY🎂 OURBIRTHDAY First Radio‼️ (DEBUT D-DAY🎂 OURBIRTHDAY 첫 라디오‼️)	Ourbirthday	August 19, 2026	
244	KiiiKiii's Summer Bursts Idol Radio🌴 (키키의 여름은 아돌라를 터뜨려🌴)	KiiiKiii	August 24, 2026	
245	[Saucin' Statement] Nexz Saucin' is the Trend These Days🥫 ([쏘씬 발언] 요즘 대세는 넥스지 쏘씬🥫)	Nexz	September 1, 2026	Special DJ: Ryujin (Itzy)
246	Idol Radio is Now in Tunexx MODE 🩵 (아돌라는 지금 튜넥스 MODE 🩵)	Tunexx	September 2, 2026	
247	No Matter What Verivery Does, Idol Radio Says 'Don't Panic!'💥 (베리베리가 뭘 해도 아돌라는 'Don't Panic!'💥)	Verivery	September 9, 2026	Verivery members Hoyoung and Minchan are absent
248	🎊To The Boyz — Love You Stay Healthy Congratulations🎊 (🎊더보이즈 덩어리 사랑해 건강해 축하해🎊)	The Boyz	September 16, 2026	Sunwoo and Eric would co-host this episode Broadcast began at 23:30 (KST)
249	Daily:Direction's Idol Radio DAY📅 (데일리:디렉션의 아돌라DAY📅)	Daily:Direction	September 30, 2026	
250	NiziU are S-s-s-s-sour grapes🍇 Idol Radio L-o-v-e-s NiziU🫶 (니쥬는 S-s-s-s-sour grapes🍇 아돌라는 니쥬 사-사-사-사-사랑해🫶)	NiziU	October 7, 2026	NiziU member Rio is absent
251	CYE is Perfect Fit for Idol Radio🎼 (클유아는 아돌라에 딱 Fit 해🎼)	Close Your Eyes	October 14, 2026	
252	📁 The Incomplete Emotions Sung by Yuju (📁 유주가 노래하는 미완의 감정)	Yuju	October 19, 2026	Broadcast began at 14:00 (KST)
253	Modyssey Idol Radio First Ride Day! Hop On Without Fear!!🏁 (모디세이 아돌라 첫 탑승데이! 겁 없이 올라타!!🏁)	Modyssey	October 21, 2026	
254	BE BOYS HERE! BBS are Here on Idol Radio🔥 (BE BOYS HERE! 삡즈 아돌라 나왔어요🔥)	Be Boys	October 27, 2026	
255	The Gates of Heaven Opened After Meeting And2ble🪽 Oohlala~💋 (앤더블 만나고 천국의 문 열렸다🪽 울랄라~💋)	And2ble	October 28, 2026	
256	Unchild is Participating in Idol Radio Ting Ting🐸 (언차일드 아돌라 출전합니다 팅팅🐸)	Unchild	November 18, 2026	Special DJs: STAYC (Sumin, Isa); Unchild member Heekie is absent Broadcast would be held in MBC's regular radio studio due to construction works around the MBC Garden Studio
257	TBA	Ampers&One	November 25, 2026	

== Concerts ==
=== Idol Radio Live in Tokyo (2022, 2024) ===
On October 14, 2022, MBC Radio announced that Idol Radio would be holding the offline concert titled "Idol Radio Live in Tokyo" at the Tokyo Garden Theater on October 20. Got7's Youngjae, and Monsta X's Joohoney and Hyungwon hosted the show. The lineup consisted of Astro (Jinjin, Rocky, Moonbin, Yoon San-ha), Golden Child, STAYC, and INI, with individual stages by Youngjae and Joohoney. The concert lasted for three hours, with an audience of 7,000 people. After the show, the keyword 'Idol Radio' rose to number six on Japan's Yahoo! trend rankings.

The second Idol Radio Live in Tokyo, titled "Idol Radio Live in Tokyo - Shining Moments", was held at the Tokyo Garden Theater on September 28, 2024, with Kang Ji-young of Kara as the host. The concert would be held in two timeslots, one at the Day timeslot which began at 14:00 (JST), and one at the Night timeslot which began at 19:00 (JST). The lineup consisted of Yesung (Super Junior), Onew (Shinee), Taisei Fukumoto and Moonbyul (Mamamoo), with Mave: and Octpath in only the Day timeslot and Ballistik Boyz from Exile Tribe in only the Night timeslot. DreamNote was announced to be the opening act for both timeslots.

=== MBC Idol Radio Live in Japan (2023) ===
On February 25, 2023, MBC Radio announced that Idol Radio would be holding the offline concert titled "MBC Idol Radio Live in Japan" at the Makuhari Messe on April 1–2. The lineup consisted of iKon, Moonbin & Sanha (Astro), Viviz, Oneus, LimeLight and N.SSign.

=== Idol Radio Live in Seoul (2023) ===
On June 21, 2023, MBC Radio announced that Idol Radio would be holding the offline concert titled "Idol Radio Live in Seoul" at the Seoul World Cup Stadium on September 23. The lineup consisted of Apink, Oh My Girl, Young K (Day6), iKon, ONF, Ateez, Lucy, Lee Seung-yoon, Nmixx, Plave and Evnne, with Kim Jae-joong as the concert's special guest.

=== Idol Radio Live in Yokohama (2024) ===
On January 30, 2024, MBC Radio announced that Idol Radio would be holding the offline concert titled "Idol Radio Live in Yokohama" at the K-Arena Yokohama on March 26, with Sunwoo of The Boyz as the host. The lineup consisted of Kyuhyun (Super Junior), 2PM (Jun. K, Nichkhun), The Boyz, INI (Hiromu Takatsuka, Kyosuke Fujimaki, Takumi Ozaki), Kep1er, ATBO, KyoungSeo and Ai Tomioka.

=== Idol Radio Super Rookies (2024) ===
MBC and Interactive Media Mix (IMX) collaborated to hold the K-pop showcase project titled "Idol Radio Super Rookies", which is a showcase for upcoming rookies. The first volume was held on May 4, 2024, at the Zepp DiverCity in Tokyo, with H1-Key and Ampers&One in the performing lineup.

The second volume was held on August 25, 2024, at the Zepp DiverCity in Tokyo, with All(H)Ours and Pow in the performing lineup.

=== Idol Radio Live in Macau (2025) ===
On February 4, 2025, MBC Radio announced that Idol Radio would be holding the offline concert titled "Idol Radio Live in Macau" at the Venetian Arena on March 1–2, with The Boyz's Sunwoo and Eric as the hosts. The lineup consisted of Highlight (Lee Gi-kwang, Son Dong-woon), The Boyz, P1Harmony and Izna. Izna member Yoon Ji-yoon was absent due to hiatus.

=== Idol Radio Special - Super Vibe Korea (2025) ===
On October 3, 2025, MBC Radio announced that Idol Radio would be holding the special offline concert titled "Super Vibe Korea" at the Inspire Arena on December 6–7, with The Boyz's Sunwoo and Eric as the hosts. The Day 1 lineup consists of Gray, Camo, M1nu, and 82Major, while the Day 2 lineup consists of E Sens, Lil Boi (Geeks), AXN, and DKB, with DJ Soda and The Boyz also performing on both days. Timbaland, Trey Songz, Mims and Milli were initially named in the performing lineup, however on November 17, it was announced that due to unavoidable circumstances, their performances have been canceled.

=== Idol Radio Live in Kuala Lumpur (2026) ===
Idol Radio held the offline concert titled "Idol Radio Live in Kuala Lumpur" at the Inspire Live Arena in Kuala Lumpur on October 3, 2026. The lineup consisted of Kiss of Life, 82Major and WHIB, with special guest Ismail Izzani. The concert was hosted by Kiss of Life members Julie and Belle.
