= 2018 in South Korean music =

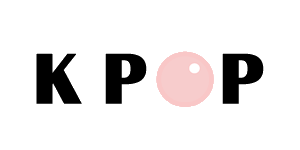
K-POP music logo

The following is a list of notable events and releases that happened in 2018 in music in South Korea.

== Notable achievements and events ==
- January 10–11 – IU and BTS win the digital and album daesangs, respectively, at the 32nd Golden Disc Awards.
- February 25 – CL and Exo headline the 2018 Winter Olympics closing ceremony at the Pyeongchang Olympic Stadium, serving as representatives of K-pop at the event.
- February 28 – At the annual Korean Music Awards, BTS, Kang Tae-gu, and Hyukoh win the grand prizes.
- April 1 and 3 – The Spring is Coming Korean cultural diplomacy concert takes place in Pyongyang, North Korea, which featured performances from various South Korean musicians including Cho Yong-pil, Red Velvet, Lee Sun-hee, Baek Ji-young, and Seohyun.
- April 20 – The Korea Music Content Association launches new certification system for albums, downloads, and streaming in South Korea.
- May 27 – Love Yourself: Tear by BTS becomes the first K-pop album to top the Billboard 200, as well as the highest-charting album by any Asian act.
- May 28 – Twice's "Wake Me Up" becomes the first single by a foreign female artist to be certified double platinum by the Recording Industry Association of Japan (RIAJ).
- May 29 – BTS's "Fake Love" becomes the first K-pop song to enter the top-ten on the Billboard Hot 100, and the 17th non-English song to do so in the chart's history.
- June 16 – "Ddu-Du Ddu-Du" by Blackpink records 36.2 million views on YouTube video within 24 hours, setting a new record by a Korean act.
- June 25 – Blackpink's "Ddu-Du Ddu-Du" and Square Up simultaneously become the highest-charting song and album by a K-pop girl group in the US at the time.
- August 8 – Red Velvet's "Power Up" become the first ever song by an SM Entertainment artist to achieve Perfect All-Kill on the iChart.
- October 24 – The 9th government-run Korean Popular Culture and Arts Awards take place. Kim Min-ki, Jo Dong-jin, Gim Jeong-taek, and BTS are awarded with the Order of Cultural Merit; BTS were the youngest recipients of the honor in South Korean history. Yoon Sang is awarded with the Presidential Commendation and Kang San-ae and Choi Jin-hee receive the Prime Mister's Commendation.
- November 5 – Twice become the fastest K-pop girl group to reach 20 million views on YouTube with "Yes or Yes", doing so in 10 hours and 27 minutes.
- November 9 – "Mic Drop" (Steve Aoki remix) is certified platinum by the RIAA, making BTS the first Korean group with a platinum-certified single in the US.
- November 12 – Exo becomes the first group to surpass 10 million total album sales in South Korea.
- December 1 – At the annual Melon Music Awards, iKon and BTS win the grand prizes.
- December 10, 12, 14 – The 2018 Mnet Asian Music Awards are held in South Korea, Japan, Hong Kong over the course of a week. BTS and Twice receive the grand prizes at the ceremony.
- According to Forbes, "the South Korean music market experienced a 17.9% increase in revenue growth in 2018, and it was described as 'shifting from 'potential' to 'power' player'" on the global stage.

== Award shows and festivals ==
=== Award ceremonies ===
2018 music award ceremonies in South Korea
Date	Event	Host
January 10–11	32nd Golden Disc Awards	Ilgan Sports and JTBC Plus
January 25	27th Seoul Music Awards	Sports Seoul
February 28	6th Korean Music Awards	Korean Music Awards Committee
October 24	9th Korean Popular Culture and Arts Awards	Korea Creative Content Agency
November 6	1st Genie Music Awards	MBC Plus and Genie Music
November 28	3rd Asia Artist Awards	Money Today, StarNews and MTN
December 1	10th Melon Music Awards	Kakao M
December 10, 12, 14	20th Mnet Asian Music Awards	CJ E&M (Mnet)

=== Festivals ===
2018 televised music festivals in South Korea
Date	Event	Host
October 2–3	Asia Song Festival	Korea Foundation for International Culture Exchange
December 25	SBS Gayo Daejeon	Seoul Broadcasting System (SBS)
December 28	KBS Song Festival	Korean Broadcasting System (KBS)
December 31	MBC Gayo Daejejeon	Munhwa Broadcasting Corporation (MBC)

== Debuting and disbanding in 2018 ==
=== Debuting groups ===
- Ateez
- D-Crunch
- DreamNote
- Fanatics - Flavor
- Forestella
- Fromis 9
- (G)I-dle
- Girlkind
- Gugudan SeMiNa
- GWSN
- Honey Popcorn
- Iz*One
- JBJ95
- Loona
- Maywish
- Nature
- NeonPunch
- Noir
- NTB
- Oh!GG
- Pristin V
- Saturday
- Spectrum
- Stray Kids
- Target
- UNB
- Uni.T
- W24
- We Girls
- WJMK

=== Solo debuts ===
- Ash Island
- Elkie
- Haon
- Ha Hyun-woo
- Holland
- Hoya
- Hynn
- Jennie
- J-Hope
- Jin Longguo
- Jung Il-hoon
- Katie
- Key
- Kim Dong-han
- Lee Chang-sub
- Leo
- Mino
- Moonbyul
- Onew
- Zior Park
- Sohee
- Sori
- Son Dong-woon
- Sooyoung
- twlv
- Vinxen
- Wheein
- Yoo Seon-ho
- Youra
- Yubin
- Yuju
- Yuri

=== Disbandments ===
- Drunken Tiger
- Fiestar
- Homme
- JBJ
- Kiha & The Faces
- Melody Day
- Mr.Mr
- NU'EST W
- NRG
- Rainz
- SSAW
- Stellar
- Tahiti
- The East Light
- Triple H
- Trouble Maker
- Uni.T

== Releases in 2018 ==
=== First quarter ===
==== January ====
Date	Album	Artist(s)	Genre(s)	Ref
1	Play in Nature Part.3 Snow Flake	Kim Kyu-jong	Ballad	
2	Who Am I	TRCNG	Dance	
3	Great!	Momoland	Dance, Pop	
3	Dream of Paradise	Kriesha Chu	Dance, Ballad	
3	The Hottest: N.Flying	N.Flying	Rock	
5	R.ebirth 2016	Ravi	Hip hop	
8	Top Seed	Infinite	Dance, Ballad	
8	Re:Montage	Block B	Ballad, Dance	
8	Mixtape	Stray Kids	Dance, Hip hop	
9	Secret Garden	Oh My Girl	Dance	
10	Match Up	MXM	Hip hop	
11	Reply	Kim Dong-ryul	Ballad	
15	Bye	Jang Wooyoung	Folk, Dance	
16	Seasons	The Barberettes	Folk	
17	Offset	Chungha	Dance, Ballad	
17	True Colors	JBJ	Dance, Ballad	
19	Trapart	Sik-K	Hip hop	
19	Prison Playbook OST	Various artists	OST	
22	Nirvana	Ravi	Hip hop	
22	Two Cops OST	Various artists	OST, Ballad	
23	Poet Artist	Jonghyun	R&B, Dance	
23	Shake You Up	Rainz	Dance	
24	To. Heart	Fromis 9	Dance	
24	After	Jeong Se-woon	R&B, Ballad	
24	Alive	Target	Dance	
24	Black Knight: The Man Who Guards Me OST	Various artists	OST, Ballad	
25	Return	iKon	Hip hop	
25	&10	Davichi	Ballad	
26	3	Jo Jung-chi	Folk	
26	Monthly Project 2017 Yoon Jong-shin	Yoon Jong-shin	Ballad, R&B	
29	Faces of Love	Suzy	Ballad, R&B	
29	Spotlight	VAV	Dance, Ballad	
29	Miracle	Golden Child	Dance, Ballad	
29	The Perfect Red Velvet	Red Velvet	R&B, Pop	
30	Go Won	Go Won (Loona)	Dance	
30	Rain or Shine OST	Various artists	OST, Ballad	
30	Jugglers OST	Various artists	OST, Ballad	
31	Tunnel	Paul Kim	R&B, Ballad	

==== February ====
Date	Album	Artist(s)	Genre(s)	Ref
1	Don't Be Pretty	14U	Dance	
1	Act. 4 Cait Sith	Gugudan	Dance	
3	Money Flower OST	Various artists	OST, Ballad	
4	Bad Guys 2 OST	Various artists	OST, Pop-rap	
5	Director's Cut	Seventeen	Dance, Ballad	
8	Baby Funk	Naul	Neo soul, Funk	
12	Mi Amor	CocoSori	Pop, Dance	
13	Golden Slumber OST	Various artists	OST, Ballad	
19	Back	Yang Yo-seob	R&B, Ballad	
19	Spring Again	Jung Seung-hwan	Ballad	
20	One Shot, Two Shot	BoA	Dance, Hip hop	
21	Lucky	Weki Meki	Dance	
22	Black Dress	CLC	Dance, Electronica	
26	10 Stories	Kim Sung-kyu	Rock, Ballad	
26	Mamma Mia!	SF9	Dance, Ballad	
27	Dream Your Dream	Cosmic Girls	Dance	
27	The Second	Take	Ballad	
28	28 Identity	Cheetah	Hip hop	

==== March ====
Date	Album	Artist(s)	Genre(s)	Ref
2	Hope World	J-Hope	Hip hop	
2	Identity	Sleepy	Hip hop	
2	Fountain	Jooyoung	R&B	
3	A Korean Odyssey OST	Various artists	OST, Ballad	
7	Yellow Flower	Mamamoo	Ballad, R&B	
7	4 the Youth	Justhis & Paloalto	Hip hop, Rap	
8	Wish & Wind	Heize	Hip hop, R&B	
8	Big Wave	Jung Il-hoon	Hip hop	
8	Singing Dancing	W24	Rock	
12	Eyes on You	Got7	Dance, R&B	
12	The Blue	April	Dance	
13	Only Human	Junoflo	Hip hop	
14	Evolution	Forestella	Ballad	
14	NCT 2018 Empathy	NCT	Dance, Hip hop	
14	Portrait	Peakboy	Hip hop	
14	Made in Bangkok	Skull	Pop-rap, Reggae	
15	Invitation	UP10TION	Dance, Ballad	
17	Begin Again	Jo Kwan-woo	Ballad	
19	0+1=1 (I Promise You)	Wanna One	Dance, Ballad	
20	Misty OST	Various artists	OST, Ballad	
21	Bibidi Babidi Boo	Honey Popcorn	Dance	
22	Into the Light	Solid	R&B	
22	Return OST	Various artists	OST, Rock	
26	The Connect: Dejavu	Monsta X	Hip hop	
26	I Am Not	Stray Kids	Hip hop	
28	New Chapter No. 1: The Chance of Love	TVXQ	Dance, Ballad	
28	One	Samuel	Dance, R&B	
28	Shower	Hoya	R&B, Dance	
28	Sound Doctrine	Naul	Neo soul, R&B	
29	Fiancée^{1}	Jung Joon-young	Ballad	
29	Parkjiyoon 20th Anniversary Photo&Live Album	Park Ji-yoon	Ballad	
30	Olivia Hye	Olivia Hye (Loona)	Electronic	

=== Second quarter ===
==== April ====
Date	Album	Artist(s)	Genre(s)	Ref
1	People Said Break It Up	Gavy NJ	Ballad	
2	Positive	Pentagon	Pop-rap, Ballad	
2	Banana Allergy Monkey	Oh My Girl Banhana	Dance, Ballad	
2	Lady^{1}	EXID	Dance	
3	The Start	The Boyz	Dance, R&B	
3	Do Worry Be Happy	Primary, Anda	Electronica	
4	Everyday	Winner	Ballad, Hip hop	
5	Foundation Vol.4	Basick	Pop-rap	
6	Light	Microdot	Pop-rap	
7	Boyhood	UNB	Dance, Ballad	
8	Dream; Fly	Heo Young-saeng	R&B, Ballad	
9	What Is Love?	Twice	Dance, Bubblegum	
9	Twenty's Noir	Noir	Dance, R&B	
9	The Book of John: Part.1	JK Kim Dong-wook	Ballad	
10	Color of Dream	Hyeongseop X Euiwoong	Ballad, Dance	
10	Blooming Days	Exo-CBX	Dance, Pop	
10	4.10 MHz	Youngjun	Ballad	
11	Honestly	Eric Nam	Dance, Ballad	
11	Spring, Seonho	Yoo Seon-ho	Ballad	
11	The Bright Sky	Lee Chang-min	Ballad, R&B	
12	Replay	Super Junior	Dance	
12	Telescope	Reddy	Hip hop	
16	Void	The Rose	Pop rock	
17	Eau de VIXX	VIXX	Dance, R&B	
17	New Moon	JBJ	Dance, Hip hop	
19	Miracle^{1}	Apink	Ballad	
19	Play in Nature	Kim Kyu-jong	Ballad	
19	Snapshot	IN2IT	Dance	
23	Heal	Lovelyz	Dance, Ballad	
23	Evergreen OST	Various artists	OST, Ballad	
24	Be Myself	Hwang Chi-yeul	Ballad	
24	Blossom	Snuper	Dance, Synthpop	
24	Solar Sensitivity Part.6	Solar	Folk, Ballad	
30	Time for the Moon Night	GFriend	Dance, Ballad	

==== May ====
Date	Album	Artist(s)	Genre(s)	Ref
1	Angel	IZ	Rock, Dance	
2	I Am	(G)I-dle	Dance, Ballad	
8	Zero	Cross Gene	Dance, R&B	
8	Seoul Night	Teen Top	Dance, Ballad	
8	Recipe	Ben	Ballad, R&B	
9	Goodbye 20's	Yong Jun-hyung	Dance, R&B	
9	367	Baechigi	Pop-rap	
9	Be Born	Spectrum	Dance	
9	Long Way	Peppertones	Indie pop, Alternative rock	
9	Smelting	Vinxen	Hip hop	
10	Love Loves To Love Love	Favorite	Dance	
10	Forever Yours	Kim Yeon-woo	Ballad, R&B	
10	Escape The Era	Dreamcatcher	Dance, Rock	
15	Repetition	Kanto	Hip hop	
16	How Are You?	N.Flying	Pop rock	
18	Line	Uni.T	Dance, Ballad	
18	Love Yourself: Tear	BTS	Pop-rap, Dance	
21	Goødevil	Ja Mezz	Hip hop	
23	Time of Sorrow^{1}	Victon	Dance	
23	Love Story^{1}	TST	Dance	
24	Re;mind	J'Kyun	Hip hop	
24	Love Flutters	The East Light	Dance,	
24	Red Diary Page.2	Bolbbalgan4	Indie rock	
25	Bonnie N Clyde	24K	Dance, R&B	
28	The Story of Light EP.1	Shinee	Dance, Electronica	
28	Bingle Bangle	AOA	Dance	
28	Like a V	Pristin V	Dance	
28	Dramatic	NTB	Dance	
30	20	South Club	Indie rock	
30	Beauty & the Beat	Loona yyxy	Dance, Ballad	
30	Teenager	Samuel	Dance, R&B	
30	Le Dernier Amour	Lee Sun-hee	Ballad	
31	24: How to Find True Love and Happiness	Hyukoh	Indie rock	

==== June ====
Date	Album	Artist(s)	Genre(s)	Ref
4	1÷x=1 (Undivided)	Wanna One	Dance, Ballad	
5	To. Day	Fromis 9	Dance	
7	You Complete Me	ONF	Dance, Ballad	
7	A.C.E Adventures in Wonderland	Ace	Dance, Hip hop	
11	The Story of Light EP.2	Shinee	Electronica, Dance	
11	Dnsg	Changmo	Pop-rap	
12	Grapes	Busters	Dance, Hip hop	
14	[Present]	Woo Jin-young, Kim Hyun-soo	Dance	
15	Square Up	Blackpink	Dance, Trap	
15	Darkroom	Simon Dominic	Pop-rap	
15	Moolood Gang Tape	Superbee, twlv	Hip hop	
18	This Is Us	BtoB	Ballad, Dance	
18	Something New	Taeyeon	R&B, Dance	
18	Trigger (EP)	Lee Joo-min	K-pop	
19	D-Day	Kim Dong-han	Dance	
20	Something in the Rain OST	Various artists	OST	
22	Jaurim	Jaurim	Alternative rock, Pop	
25	Who, You	NU'EST W	Dance, Ballad	
25	The Story of Light EP.3	Shinee	R&B, Ballad	
26	Fun to the World	Momoland	Dance, Pop, Electropop	
26	Shoot Me: Youth Part 1	Day6	Pop rock	
26	K1tchen	Ravi	Hip hop	
26	Jinah Restaurant Full Course	Lee Jin-ah	Jazz, Jazz rap	
27	Moonlight	NeonPunch	Dance	
28	Summer Dream	Elris	Dance	
28	Black Heart	UNB	Dance, Ballad	
28	The Seasons Revolve - Summer^{1}	Jun Jin	Ballad	
29	Moolood Gang Tape II	Superbee, twlv	Hip hop	

=== Third quarter ===
==== July ====
Date	Album	Artist(s)	Genre(s)	Ref
2	One & Six	Apink	Dance, Ballad	
3	The Fairy Tale	MeloMance	Ballad, Indie folk	
3	Teen Top Story: 8pisode	Teen Top	Dance, Ballad	
4	Goldenness	Golden Child	Dance, Ballad	
5	Gemini 2	Yoon Mi-rae	Neo soul, Pop-rap	
9	Summer Nights	Twice	Dance	
9	Is It True^{1}	Target	Dance	
10	F;uzzle	Myteen	Dance, R&B	
10	SeMiNa	Gugudan SeMiNa	Dance	
10	About Time OST	Various artists	OST, Ballad	
11	The Color of Seenroot	Seenroot	Contemporary folk	
13	Wonderlost	Crush	R&B	
16	Red Moon	Mamamoo	Dance, R&B	
16	You Make My Day	Seventeen	Dance, Hip hop	
16	Electric Jungle	Galaxy Express	Rock	
17	Summer Grooves	Paloalto	Hip-hop, Rap	
18	Blooming Blue	Chung Ha	Dance, Ballad	
18	Retro Futurism	Triple H	Hip hop, Dance	
19	Sunny Summer	GFriend	Dance	
20	The Great Seungri	Seungri	Dance, R&B	
22	Hightechnology	Giriboy	Pop-rap	
23	Another	Jeong Se-woon	R&B, Ballad	
24	Rise Up	Astro	Dance, Ballad	
25	Ride on the Wind	Kard	Dance, Hip hop	
26	What If	F.T. Island	Pop rock	
26	Into the Night Fever	IN2IT	Dance	
27	Between Us	Laboum	Dance	
31	Canvas	Leo	Dance, R&B	
31	Sensuous	SF9	Dance	
31	Thinking About You	Microdot	Pop-rap	

==== August ====
Date	Album	Artist(s)	Genre(s)	Ref
1	Bank Robber	Villain	Hip hop, R&B	
2	New Kids: Continue	iKon	Dance, Ballad	
3	Girls and Flowers	Nature	Dance	
5	Contents ½	twlv	R&B, hip hop	
6	Summer Magic	Red Velvet	Pop, R&B, Swing	
6	I Am Who	Stray Kids	Hip hop	
6	0806	D-Crunch	Hip hop	
9	Summer Ade	DIA	Dance, Ballad	
11	Goodbye to Goodbye OST	Various artists	OST, Ballad	
14	More Than Ever	MXM	Hip hop, Ballad	
15	Kim Hyung-suk with Friends Pop & Pop Collaboration #1 Ken (VIXX) x Bicha^{1}	Ken	Ballad	
16	'Bout You	Super Junior-D&E	Dance, Hip hop	
16	Free Travel	Berry Good	Dance, Ballad	
18	Emphasize	Bigflo	Dance, Hip hop	
20	[+ +]	Loona	Dance	
20	UP10TION 2018 Special Photo Edition	UP10TION	Dance	
22	Kim Sung-kyu 1st Solo Concert Live 'Shine'	Kim Sung-kyu	Rock, Ballad	
24	Love Yourself: Answer	BTS	Hip hop	
28	Heart	Shinhwa	Dance, R&B	
29	Friday n Night	Jin Longguo	R&B, Ballad	
31	On Air	We Girls	Dance-pop	

==== September ====
Date	Album	Artist(s)	Genre(s)	Ref
3	Sunshine	100%	Dance, Ballad	
3	Second Write..	Nam Woo-hyun	Ballad, Pop rock	
3	We Go Up	NCT Dream	Hip hop, Dance	
4	Warning	Sunmi	Dance, R&B	
4	Jiminxjamie	Park Ji-min	R&B, Dance	
4	Touch^{1}	Sori	Dance, Tropical	
4	Take Off	GreatGuys	Dance	
5	The Park in the Night Part One	GWSN	Dance, Ballad	
5	Travel: Noah	Haon	Pop-rap	
5	Lil’ Touch	Oh!GG	Dance, Ballad	
5	The Sphere	The Boyz	Dance	
5	I'm Alright	WoongSan	Jazz	
7	Glow Forever	The Quiett	Pop-rap	
10	Remember Me	Oh My Girl	Dance, Ballad	
10	Thumbs Up!	Pentagon	Pop-rap, Ballad	
10	The Story of Light - Epilogue	Shinee	Dance, R&B	
10	Muse on Music	Lovelyz	Instrumental	
12	Unity	Samuel Seo	Neo soul, Funk	
13	V	Humming Urban Stereo	EDM, R&B	
13	Miracle	Duetto	Crossover	
13	Crossroad	Jung Dong-ha	Ballad	
17	Present: You	Got7	Dance, Hip hop	
17	Gangnam Beauty OST	Various artists	OST, Ballad	
18	Begin With The End	Uni.T	Dance, Ballad	
18	The Big Dipper	Lucente	Dance, EDM	
19	WJ Please?	Cosmic Girls	Dance, Ballad	
19	There Has Never Been a Day I Haven't Loved You	Im Chang-jung	Ballad, Electronic	
20	Alone In The City	Dreamcatcher	Pop rock, Dance	
20	Say Yes	S.I.S	Dance, Ballad	
22	Science Fiction Music	Giriboy	Pop-rap	
28	Ending Credit.	Boys Republic	Ballad	

=== Fourth quarter ===
==== October ====
Date	Album	Artist(s)	Genre(s)	Ref
1	New Kids: The Final	iKon	Ballad, Dance	
1	R	Park Won	Ballad	
1	Mr. Sunshine OST	Various artists	OST, Ballad	
2	Topgun	Noir	Hip hop, Dance	
3	Caelo	Babylon	R&B	
4	The First Scene	Yuri	Dance, Ballad	
4	Words in the Mind	Epitone Project	Ballad	
4	Re:Fresh	Soyou	Dance, R&B	
4	Dawn	The Rose	Pop rock	
6	#7	Seven O'Clock	Dance, Hip hop	
8	One More Time	Super Junior	Dance, Latin pop	
8	You in My Eyes	Snuper	Dance, Hip hop	
10	About Me	Vibe	Ballad	
10	From.9	Fromis 9	Dance	
11	Kiss, Kicks	Weki Meki	Dance, Ballad	
11	Miles Apart	Eddy Kim	Neo soul, Folk	
12	Regular-Irregular	NCT 127	Hip hop, Latin pop	
12	Remodeling	Crying Nut	Punk rock	
15	Zzz	Zion.T	Pop-rap, R&B	
16	The Ruby	April	Dance	
17	Hyehwa	Jung Eun-ji	Ballad	
17	D-Night	Kim Dong-han	Dance	
17	Artist	Soya	Dance, Hip hop	
18	Do n Do	Lee Hong-gi	Synth-pop, EDM	
22	I Am You	Stray Kids	Dance, Hip hop	
22	Between Us	Lee Moon-sae	Ballad, R&B	
22	Take.1 Are You There?	Monsta X	Hip hop, Dance	
23	Mono	RM	Hip hop, Trip hop	
24	Woman	BoA	Dance, R&B	
24	Wish	Golden Child	Dance, R&B	
24	Contact Information	South Club	Modern rock	
24	Treasure EP.1: All to Zero	Ateez	Dance, Hip hop	
25	#10	Lyn	Ballad, R&B	
28	Ithaca	Ha Hyun-woo	Pop rock, Ballad	
29	Color*Iz	Iz*One	Dance, Ballad	
30	Swamp of Despair	Black6ix	Dance, Hip hop	
30	Compass (N.E.W.S)	14U	Dance	
30	Home	JBJ95	Dance	
30	Aliens	Sultan of the Disco	R&B	
31	100 Days My Prince OST	Various artists	OST, Ballad	

==== November ====
Date	Album	Artist(s)	Genre(s)	Ref
1	Mono	Kiha & The Faces	Indie pop	
1	Paradise^{1}	TST	Dance, Hip hop	
2	Don't Mess Up My Tempo	Exo	Dance, R&B	
4	Timeless Moment	Spectrum	Dance, Ballad	
5	Yes or Yes	Twice	Dance, Ballad	
5	Star	Noel	Ballad	
6	Act. 5 New Action	Gugudan	Dance	
6	想像;Mood Indigo	K.Will	Ballad, R&B	
7	Dreamlike	DreamNote	Dance	
12	M1112 (4colors)	D-Crunch	Hip hop	
12	Hour Moment	BtoB	Ballad, R&B	
12	Solo^{1}	Jennie	Hip hop, Dance	
13	I	Fly to the Sky	Ballad, R&B	
13	Bazzaya	Chae Yeon	Dance, Ballad	
14	X: Rebirth of Tiger JK	Drunken Tiger	Hip hop	
14	Let's Part	Nell	Alternative rock	
15	Early Flowering	Hotshot	Dance, Ballad	
15	Inner	Kim Na-young	Ballad, R&B	
15	My Secret Terrius OST	Various artists	OST	
16	The Third Charm OST	Various artists	OST, Ballad	
18	Player OST	Various artists	OST, Rock	
19	1¹¹=1 (Power of Destiny)	Wanna One	Dance, Ballad	
20	Outro	Highlight	Dance, Ballad	
20	Wishes	Voisper	Ballad, R&B	
21	I Love You^{1}	EXID	Dance	
21	Dear Me	Baek A-yeon	Ballad	
22	Sun And Moon	Sam Kim	Neo soul, Ballad	
22	Af	Woo Won-jae	Hip hop	
22	Some & Love	Nature	Dance	
23	Regulate	NCT 127	Pop-rap, Dance	
26	XX	Mino	Hip hop, R&B	
26	Sanctuary	Lovelyz	Dance, Ballad	
26	Wake,N	NU'EST W	Dance, Hip hop	
26	Face	Key	R&B, EDM	
26	Matrimonial Chaos OST	Various artists	OST, Ballad	
27	05	Urban Zakapa	Ballad, R&B	
29	Blue;s	Mamamoo	R&B, Ballad	
29	The Only	The Boyz	Dance	
30	RBB	Red Velvet	Pop	

==== December ====
Date	Album	Artist(s)	Genre(s)	Ref
3	Present: You & Me	Got7	Pop-rap, Ballad	
5	Retro	Jung Key	Ballad, R&B	
5	Voice	Onew	Ballad	
5	I'm Yours	Laboum	Ballad, Dance	
6	Laberinto	Up10tion	Dance, Hip hop	
7	180°	Ben	Ballad	
10	Remember Us: Youth Part 2	Day6	Pop rock, Alternative rock	
11	Mark	Lee Chang-sub	Ballad, Alternative rock	
11	Maze Garden	Crucial Star	Hip hop	
12	The Year of "Yes"	Twice	Dance, Ballad	
13	Love Shot	Exo	Dance, R&B	
14	15	Buzz	Pop rock, Ballad	
14	Snail Mail^{1}	Younha	Ballad	
19	Millions^{1}	Winner	Dance, Hip hop	
24	A'ndy to Z^{1}	Andy	Ballad	
26	New Chapter No. 2: The Truth of Love	TVXQ	Dance, R&B	
27	Boycold 2	Vinxen	Hip hop	

== Deaths ==
- Maeng Yu-na (aged 29), singer
- Seo Min-woo (aged 33), singer (100%)

== See also ==
- 2018 in South Korea
- List of South Korean films of 2018
- List of Gaon Album Chart number ones of 2018
- List of Gaon Digital Chart number ones of 2018

== Notes ==
- ^{1}The following was released as a single but charted on the Gaon Album Chart.
