= M0527 =

EP by D-Crunch
- Released: May 27, 2019
- Genre: Hip hop
- Length: 16:51
- Language: Korean
- Label: All-S Company
- Producers: Lee Jong-seok (exec.), High Season

D-Crunch chronology
M1112 (4colors) (2018)	M0527 (2019)	Across the Universe (2020)

Singles from M0527
- 1. "Are You Ready?" Released: May 27, 2019

M0527 is the second mini-album by South Korean idol group D-Crunch. It was released on May 27, 2019, by All-S Company and distributed by Kakao M. The album and lead single "Are You Ready?" were concurrently released. D-Crunch promoted the song by performing on music chart programs across various television networks. M0527 peaked at number 46 on South Korea's national Gaon Album Chart.

== Background and composition ==
In contrast to its previous releases which concentrated on choreography and live performances, M0527 was conceived to illustrate D-Crunch's musical identity. "Are You Ready?" is described as an "intense" hip-hop track with a "delightful and comical charm".

== Release and promotion ==
All-S Company shared a group concept photo of D-Crunch via social media on May 13, 2019, which initiated a 14-day countdown to the release of M0527. It presented D-Crunch with "radiant smiles" while wearing white and red clothing, which reflects the "bright" ambience of the single. Two days later, a second picture was posted showing the nonet on a running track. Individual profile images of all nine members, in addition to a third group photo, were simultaneously published on May 23. A highlight medley of the record was also shared. A music video teaser for "Are You Ready?" was published on the subsequent day.

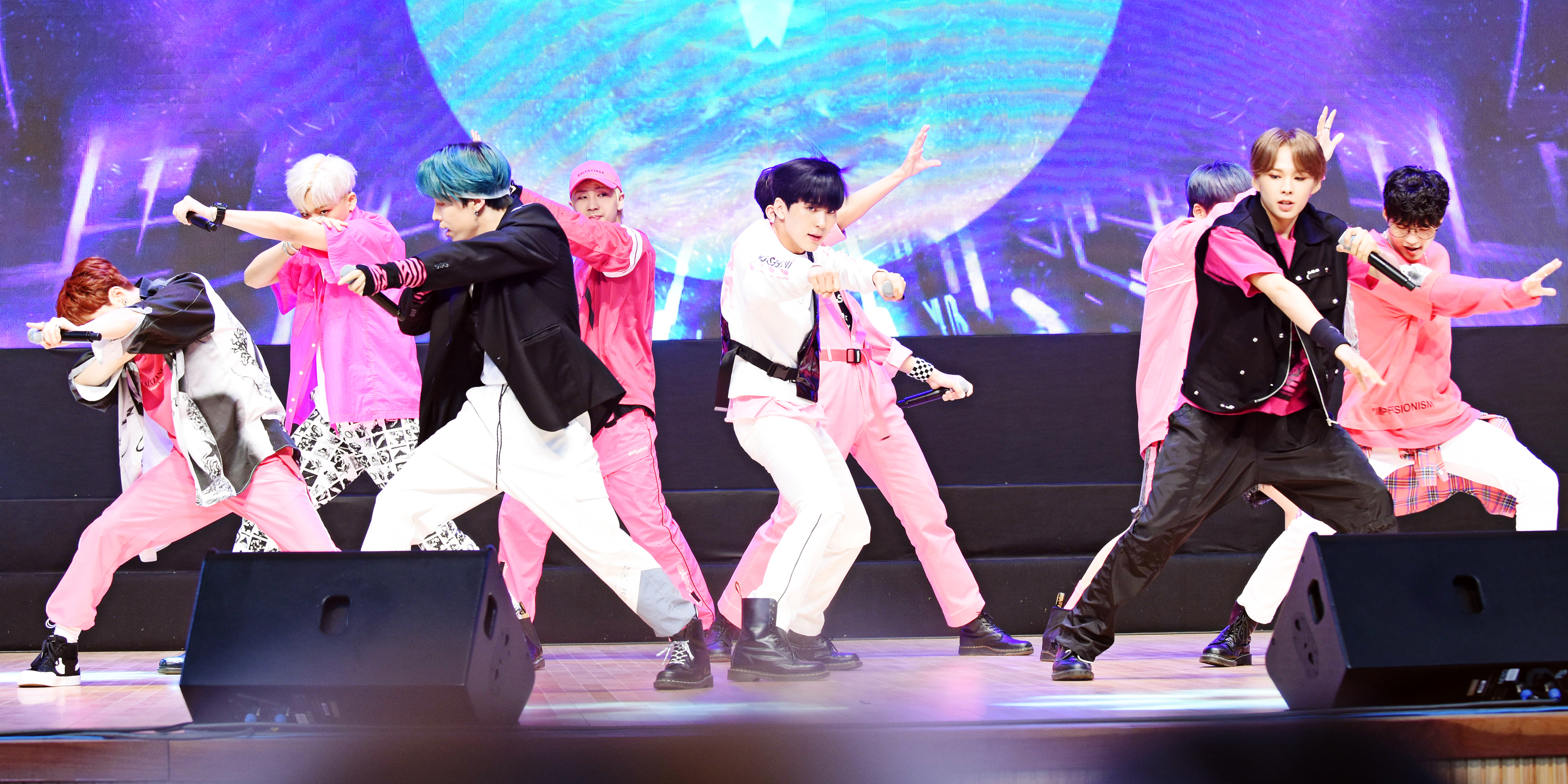
D-Crunch performing "Are You Ready?" at the 20th Night with Poetry & Music in Suwon, June 2019

D-Crunch traveled to Japan to take part in KCON 2019 for three consecutive days starting on May 17. The group performed the album track "Panorama" for the first time ahead of the release of the mini-album during the Show:Kai showcase on the opening day of the convention.

M0527 and the music video for "Are You Ready?" were simultaneously released on May 27. D-Crunch began promoting the single the following day by performing it on SBS MTV's music chart show The Show. The group made additional performances on Mnet's M Countdown MBC Every 1's Show Champion, and Munhwa Broadcasting Corporation's Show! Music Core. D-Crunch attended the 2019 Face of Asia model competition and performed the single. D-Crunch made an appearance on MBC Standard FM's radio show Idol Radio along with boy group Noir. The two groups competed against each other through dancing, singing, and rapping. Promotions for the record were completed on July 10, 2019.

== Critical reception ==
M0527 received favorable reviews from all four critics from TV Daily. Kim Ye-na characterized the mini-album as "gushing with powerful energy", with Kim Ji-ha describing "Are You Ready?" as an "addictive" single. Oh Ji-won deemed the record trendy and Kim Han-kil felt that the songs allowed listeners to look forward to live performances.

== Commercial performance ==
On the chart dated May 26 – June 1, 2019, M0527 debuted at number 46 on South Korea's national Gaon Album Chart.

== Track listing ==
M0527
No.	Title	Lyrics	Music	Arrangement	Length
1.	"Panorama"	G.I.G, Duble Sidekick, Yoske, Alive Knob, Ha Jin-kyu, Bu11$EyE	G.I.G, Duble Sidekick, Yoske, Alive Knob, Ha Jin-kyu, Bu11$EyE	Yoske, Alive Knob, Ha Jin-kyu, Bu11$EyE	3:16
2.	"Are You Ready?" (작당모의; Jakdangmoeui)	G.I.G, High Season, Dubbly	G.I.G, High Season, Dubbly	High Season, Dubbly	3:24
3.	"Love Race"	G.I.G, High Season	G.I.G, High Season, Dubbly, Melody Workshop	High Season, Dubbly, Melody Workshop	3:03
4.	"Love Letter" (행복한데; Haengbokhande)	G.I.G, High Season, Chanyoung, Jungseung, Dylan	G.I.G, High Season, Melody Workshop	High Season, Melody Workshop	3:44
5.	"Are You Ready?" (작당모의; Jakdangmoeui) (Inst.)		G.I.G, Duble Sidekick, Yoske, Alive Knob, Ha Jin-kyu, Bu11$EyE	Yoske, Alive Knob, Ha Jin-kyu, Bu11$EyE	3:24
Total length:					16:51

== Credits ==
Credits adapted from the mini-album's liner notes.

- Alive Knob – arranger, lyricist, composer
- Baek Ji-a – make-up artist
- Bu11$EyE – arranger, lyricist, composer
- Chanyoung – lyricist, choreographer
- Dubbly – arranger, lyricist, composer
- Duble Sidekick – lyricist, composer
- DDDD – jacket design
- Dylan – lyricist
- G.I.G – lyricist, composer, music director
- Ha Jin-kyu – arranger, lyricist, composer
- High Season – arranger, lyricist, composer, music director, record producer
- Hyunoh – choreographer
- Jang Gi-hyeon – photographer
- Jang Se-hwan – manufacture
- Jin Su-min – hair designer
- Jungseung – lyricist
- Kim Hyeon-sung – photographer
- Kim Ji-yeong – stylist
- Lee Jong-seok – executive producer
- Lee Woo-yong – video contents
- Melody Workshop – arranger, composer
- Na Sang-cheon – marketing director
- Nana School – choreographer
- O.V – choreographer
- Park Sang-mu – photographer
- Seok Jae-ki – video contents
- Yoske – arranger, lyricist, composer

== Chart ==
Chart (2019)	Peak position
South Korean Albums (Gaon)	46
