= Daydream (D-Crunch EP) =

2021 mini-album by D-Crunch

EP by D-Crunch
- Released: April 6, 2021
- Genre: Dance
- Length: 18:01
- Language: Korean
- Label: Ai Grand Korea

D-Crunch chronology
Across the Universe (2020)	Daydream (2021)	Addiction (2022)

Singles from Daydream
- 1. "My Name" Released: April 6, 2021

Daydream (stylized in all caps) is the fourth mini-album by South Korean idol group D-Crunch. It was released on April 6, 2021, by Ai Grand Korea and distributed by Kakao M. It marks the group's first record following the departure of vocalist Hyunwoo. A dance and ballad album, its concept revolves around its three themes: "Memory", "Nightmare", and "Daydream".

Following a series of photo and video teasers, Daydream and its lead single "My Name" were concurrently released. D-Crunch promoted the song by performing on music chart programs across various television networks. Two of the group's members were diagnosed with COVID-19 shortly after the album was issued, which forced D-Crunch to cease promotions. The mini-album peaked at number 74 on South Korea's national Gaon Album Chart.

== Background and composition ==
On December 28, 2020, Ai Grand Korea announced that vocalist Hyunwoo, who had halted promotions with D-Crunch due to an ongoing back injury three months earlier, would leave the group. He cited his health as the reason for his departure. Conceptually, Daydream revolves around three themes: "Memory", signifying the longing to return to reminiscent happy moments; "Nightmare", denying the inescapable reality of being abandoned; and "Daydream", expressing the fulfillment of a desire which is only possible in a dream. The album comprises dance music and balladry. Its music conveys dreaming and a rising moon during the day. The dreams present fantasies, illusions, daydreams, and idle dreams, which the dreamer cannot be awoken from.

Daydream opens with "My Name", a future bass-dance track. Its lyrics describe the rebirth of a person who has their named called out by a loved one. "Time to Go to You" is a ballad in which the narrator yearns for the younger self. A pop track, the lyrics of "Childlike" search to recapture the innocence of youth. The mini-album closes with the ballad "Sandcastle", a farewell to a disintegrating sandcastle being swept away by the waves of the ocean.

== Release and promotion ==
Rappers Hyunho and Dylan were cast in MBC Dramanet's web drama Time to Be Together 1:11, which began airing in March 2021. Music from Daydream was played as background music throughout its ten episodes. On March 22, Ai Grand Korea announced the release of Daydream and released a "Nightmare"-themed teaser image showcasing the group wearing black-and-white suits under crimson-colored lighting. "Memory"-themed concept images for each group member donning casual wear were uploaded two days later. Individual "Nightmare" photos of the members were published on March 26. Respective photos of the members wearing white outfits showing the "Daydream" versions were unveiled on March 29. Two days later, group portraits of all three concepts were posted by D-Crunch's agency. Two music video teasers for the lead single "My Name" were uploaded on April 1 and 2. A day ahead of the album's release, a Daydream highlight medley was shared across social networking services.

Daydream and the music video for "My Name" were simultaneously released on April 6. A performance version music video followed one week later. D-Crunch began promoting the lead single on weekly music chart shows on the day of the album's release. They performed the song on SBS MTV's The Show, MBC Every 1's Show Champion, and Mnet's M Countdown. Vocalist Hyunwook and rapper O.V experienced cold-like symptoms amidst promotions and were diagnosed with COVID-19 on April 24. The pair were placed in quarantine; the remaining six members tested negative for the virus and D-Crunch immediately completed promotions for the album.

== Critical reception and commercial performance ==
Daydream received favorable reviews from both critics from TV Daily. Kim Ji-ha wrote that the tone of each member was charming, while Kim Han-kil expressed being able to feel the record's "powerful" energy. On the chart dated April 4–10, 2021, Daydream debuted at number 74 on South Korea's national Gaon Album Chart.

== Track listing ==
Daydream
No.	Title	Lyrics	Music	Arrangement	Length
1.	"My Name"	Bull$EyE, Boytoy, Ondin, Disko, O.V	Bull$EyE, Boytoy, Ondin, Disko	Bull$EyE, Boytoy, Ondin, Disko	3:49
2.	"Time to Go to You" (너에게 가는 시간; Neoege Ganeun Sigan)	Bull$EyE	Bull$EyE, Mind182	Mind182	3:45
3.	"Childlike"	Inner Child	Inner Child, Lee Tae-hun	Lee Tae-hun	3:22
4.	"Sandcastle" (모래성; Moraeseong)	Inner Child	Inner Child, Mystery	Mystery	3:16
5.	"Myname" (Inst.)		Bull$EyE, Boytoy, Ondin, Disko	Bull$EyE, Boytoy, Ondin, Disko	3:49
Total length:					18:01

== Chart ==
Chart (2021)	Peak position
South Korean Albums (Gaon)	74
