= Across the Universe (EP) =

2020 mini-album by D-Crunch

EP by D-Crunch
- Released: October 20, 2020
- Length: 18:28
- Language: Korean
- Label: Ai Grand Korea

D-Crunch chronology
M0527 (2019)	Across the Universe (2020)	Daydream (2021)

Singles from Across the Universe
- 1. "Across the Universe" Released: October 20, 2020

Across the Universe (Korean: 비상; Hanja: 飛上; RR: Bisang) is the third mini-album by South Korean idol group D-Crunch. It was released on October 20, 2020, by Ai Grand Korea and distributed by Kakao M. Upon the expiration of the group's contract with their former agency All-S Company at the beginning of the year, D-Crunch signed with Ai Grand Korea. While preparing music for the project, vocalist Hyunwoo suspended his activities with the group due to a back injury that had worsened.

Following a series of photo and video teasers, Across the Universe and its lead single with the same name were concurrently released. Despite his absence, Hyunwoo contributed vocals to two song recordings on the project. D-Crunch promoted the song as an eight-member group by performing on music chart programs across various television networks. The mini-album peaked at number 44 on South Korea's national Gaon Album Chart and shifted over 1,800 units domestically since its release.

== Background and music structure ==
In early 2020, D-Crunch terminated their exclusive contract with All-S Company and signed with Ai Grand Korea. The group released the trap song "Pierrot" through the new agency on May 22. While preparing new music for D-Crunch's upcoming project, an ongoing back injury vocalist Hyunwoo had sustained began to worsen. It was decided that he would halt activities to recuperate and the group would release their forthcoming mini-album with the remaining eight members.

"Across the Universe" is a hybrid trap song with a strong sound. Minhyuk, a rapper of the group, described it as "intense and sexy". It was composed by Kim Do-hyun and Jared Lee Gosselin, who make up the production duo Dvrko, and Bad Luck. Lee Shin-seong and G.I.G (a songwriting team composed of Hyunwook, O.V, and Hyunoh) penned the song lyrics. D-Crunch provides "sweet" vocals over a "beautiful" melody on the pop number "One Word". "H.A.G.Y (Have a Good Young)" delivers hopeful lyrics over an upbeat rhythm. A soft rock track, "Flower Cup" expresses D-Crunch's gratitude towards their fans. Hyunwoo's vocals were included in the two latter song recordings.

== Release and promotion ==
Ai Grand Korea shared a group concept photo of D-Crunch via social media on October 6, 2020, the first with an eight-member lineup. Profile images of each group member were released for the following two days in two batches with O.V, Hyunho, Jungseung, and Chanyoung in the first, and Hyunhoh, Minhyuk, Dylan, and Hyunwook in the second. Eight individual concept films for the members were uploaded on October 13. This was followed by two music video teasers on the subsequent days. A highlight medley was published the day before the mini-album's release.

Across the Universe and its lead single of the same name were simultaneously released on October 20. The music video for the track was directed by Kim Jong-wan. D-Crunch began promoting "Across the Universe" on weekly music chart shows that same day. They performed the single on SBS MTV's The Show, MBC Every 1's Show Champion, and Mnet's M Countdown. D-Crunch also appeared on Mokkoji Korea, where the performed the single and "Stealer".

== Critical reception and commercial performance ==
Across the Universe received favorable reviews from both critics from TV Daily. Kim Ji-ha commended D-Crunch for their vocals and the musical diversity throughout the record, while Oh Ji-won expressed shock over the immense power yet enjoyable title track.

On the chart dated October 18–24, 2020, Across the Universe debuted at number 44 on South Korea's national Gaon Album Chart. By the end of the month, the mini-album shifted 1,871 units domestically.

== Track listing ==
Across the Universe
No.	Title	Lyrics	Music	Arrangement	Length
1.	"Across the Universe" (비상; 飛上; Bisang)	Lee Shin-seong, G.I.G	Kim Do-hyun, Jared Lee Gosselin, Bad Luck	Kim Do-hyun, Jared Lee Gosselin	3:50
2.	"One Word" (한마디; Hanmadi)	ZigZag Note, Moon Sang-seon, moonc	ZigZag Note, Moon Sang-seon, moonc	ZigZag Note, Moon Sang-seon	4:14
3.	"H.A.G.Y (Have a Good Young)"	ZigZag Note, moonc	ZigZag Note, moonc	ZigZag Note	3:10
4.	"Flower Cup" (꽃받침; Kkotbatchim)	moonc, G.I.G	moonc, blacksheep	moonc, blacksheep	3:24
5.	"Across the Universe" (비상; 飛上; Bisang) (Inst.)		Kim Do-hyun, Jared Lee Gosselin, Bad Luck	Kim Do-hyun, Jared Lee Gosselin	3:50
Total length:					18:28

== Chart ==
Chart (2020)	Peak position
South Korean Albums (Gaon)	44
