= Voice + Whisper =

EP by Voisper
- Released: November 18, 2016
- Recorded: 2016
- Studio: Evermore Studios (Seoul)
- Genre: R&B
- Length: 31:18
- Language: Korean
- Label: Evermore Music
- Producer: Lee Dal-won (exec.); Kwon Gi-wook; Hong Yong-cheol

Voisper chronology
Voice + Whisper (2016)	Wishes (2018)

Singles from Voice + Whisper
- 1. "In Your Voice" Released: March 2, 2016; 2. "Summer Cold" Released: June 17, 2016; 3. "Heart" Released: October 6, 2016; 4. "Learn to Love" Released: November 18, 2016

Voice + Whisper is the debut mini-album by South Korean vocal group Voisper. It was released on November 18, 2016, by Evermore Music and distributed by LOEN Entertainment. A string of singles—"In Your Voice", "Summer Cold", and "Heart"—preceded its release. Voice + Whisper and the lead track "Learn to Love" were simultaneously released. Voisper promoted the record through music chart programs across various television networks. The mini-album peaked at number 61 on South Korea's national Gaon Album Chart.

== Background ==
Recording and mixing for Voice + Whisper took place in Seoul at Evermore Studios, except "On & On" which was mixed in Los Angeles at Earthtones Studios. The record was mastered at Sterling Sound in New York City.

== Music structure ==
Voice + Whisper opens with "On & On", a dance number which incorporates modern rock and electronic music into its sound. "Learn to Love" is an "emotional" ballad which conveys the sorrow upon the separation of two lovers. "Heart" is an R&B song with a "dramatic" composition; compromising a "sentimental" piano, the track progresses with an "intense" drum beat and synthesizer. It serves as the narrator's monologue upon separating from his partner. "Summer Cold" incorporates acoustic guitar and piano over an orchestra. The song is about a "terrible" breakup and the feeling that follows, which is compared to having a cold on a hot day. "In Your Voice" is an R&B ballad which consists of a "dreamlike" melody coupled by a "sweet" piano and "powerful" drums. It is a medium-tempo track in which the lyrics tell the "romance of first love".

== Release and promotion ==
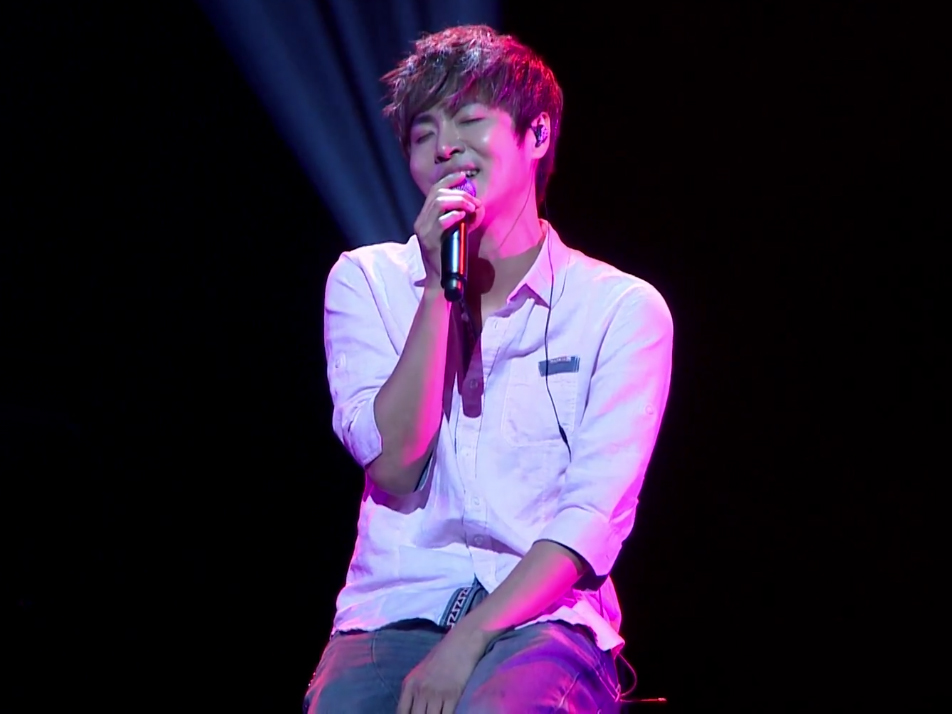
Voisper appeared at a concert by Jung Dong-ha (pictured in 2017), where the quartet performed "In Your Voice"

Prior its digital distribution, Voisper performed "In Your Voice" beginning on February 23 on SBS MTV's music program The Show, MBC Music's Show Champion, MBC's Show! Music Core, and SBS's Inkigayo. A music video teaser for the song was uploaded on February 26, with the full version being released on March 2. The group continued to promote the song on Mnet's M Countdown and KBS2's Music Bank. Voisper also performed "In Your Voice" for the video platform JuseTV. The quartet sang the song while appearing on KBS Cool FM's Yoo Ji-won's Rooftop Radio, SBS Power FM's Cultwo Show, and MBC FM4U's Kim Shin-young's Hope Song at Noon. Voisper also made a guest appearance on labelmate Jung Dong-ha's Dream concert in Seongnam, where they performed "In Your Voice".

On June 8, 2016, an image teaser was publicized for Voisper's upcoming release. A music video teaser for "Summer Cold" followed one week later; the full version was uploaded on June 17, where actors Jeon Yeo-been and Jang Woo-young play the onscreen couple. A promotional poster for the song showcasing Jeon was posted throughout Seoul, including in Daehangno, Hongdae, Sinchon, Nowon, and Konkuk University. Voisper sang "Summer Cold" for the video platform JuseTV. Voisper promoted "Summer Cold" by performing the single on SBS MTV's The Show and MBC Music's Show Champion. The group also performed the song on the Floating Stage in Yeouido.

A photo teaser signaling the release of "Heart" was published on October 4. Released two days later, the track marked the pre-release for Voisper + Whisper and Voisper's third single. Voisper also performed "Heart" for the video platform JuseTV.

Promotion for Voice + Whisper was initiated on November 9 with the release of teaser photos for each member. On November 11, four music video stills were published, followed by a video teaser five days later. The mini-album and lead single "Learn to Love" were concurrently released on November 18. Later that day, Voisper held an album showcase at the Ilchi Art Hall in the Gangnam District of Seoul.

== Critical reception ==
Kim Seong-dae of MyDaily complimented Voisper's vocals, noting the group's "sweet" harmonies since its debut single "In Your Voice". Writing for TV Daily, Kim Ji-ha lauded the members' individual vocals as well as their harmony as a group. Kim Han-gil echoed the sentiment, expressing that the record "boasts perfect harmonies".

== Commercial performance ==
On the chart dated November 20 – 26, 2016, Voice + Whisper debuted at number 61 on South Korea's national Gaon Album Chart.

== Track listing ==
Track listing
No.	Title	Lyrics	Music	Arrangement	Length
1.	"On & On"	1sagain	Donnie J	Donnie J	3:41
2.	"Learn to Love" (어쩌니; Eojjeoni)	Yoon Sa-ra	Gi Hyeon-seok, Baek Hyeon-su, joon6	Gi Hyeon-seok, Baek Hyeon-su, joon6	3:55
3.	"Like the Moon and Stars"	Kim Kang-san, 1sagain	Kim Kang-san, Park Dong-il	Park Dong-il, Choi Ga-ram	4:25
4.	"Heart" (넌 지금 어디에; Neon Jigeum Eodie) (featuring Jeon Mi-ri)	Kang Han, 1sagain	Donnie J	Donnie J	3:54
5.	"Summer Cold" (여름감기; Eojjeoni)	Kang Han	Kim Ji-hu, Song Jin-seok	Kim Ji-hu, Song Jin-seok	3:47
6.	"In Your Voice" (그대 목소리로 말해줘; Geudae Moksoriro Malhaejwo)	Kang Han	Donnie J	Donnie J	3:54
7.	"Learn to Love" (어쩌니; Eojjeoni) (Inst.)		Gi Hyeon-seok, Baek Hyeon-su, joon6	Gi Hyeon-seok, Baek Hyeon-su, joon6	3:55
8.	"Summer Cold" (여름감기; Eojjeoni) (Inst.)		Kim Ji-hu, Song Jin-seok	Kim Ji-hu, Song Jin-seok	3:47
Total length:					31:18

== Credits ==
Credits adapted from the mini-album's liner notes.

- 1sagain – lyricist
- Amy J – intro narration ("In Your Voice")
- Arania – printing
- Baek Hyeon-su – arranger, composer
- Choi Ga-ram – arranger
- Choi Hun – bass
- Choi Jin-a – stylist
- Choi Ji-hun – project supervisor
- Claudio Cueni – mixing engineer
- Dae-yeong at Style Floor – make-up
- Dan-bi at Style Floor – hair
- Donnie J – arranger, chorus arrangement, composer, piano, synthesizer
- Gi Hyeon-seok – arranger, composer
- Hong Yong-cheol – co-producer, mixing engineer, recording engineer
- Hwang Hyeon-jo – administration
- Im Seok-jin at Zany Bros – music video director
- Jang Ji-won – piano
- joon6 – arranger, composer, piano
- Jung Sang-hyeon – drums
- Kang Han – chorus arrangement, lyricist
- Kim Hyeon-cheol – management
- Kim Ik-gyeom – promotion
- Kim Ji-hu – arranger, composer
- Kim Jong-gak – project supervisor
- Kim Kang-san – composer, lyricist
- Kim Seong-dae – management
- Kwon Da-som – A&R
- Kwon Gi-wook – producer
- Joe LaPorta – mastering engineer
- lllayer – design
- Lee Geun-hyeon – guitar
- Lee Dal-won – executive producer
- Lee Hun-gu – photography
- Lee Jae-min – project planning
- Lee Seong-ryeol – guitar
- Lee Woo-hyeon – assistant engineer
- Park Dong-il – composer, arranger, piano
- Park Go-eun – marketing
- Park Sang-hyeop – assistant engineer
- Park Sun-cheol – bass
- Ryu Jeong-su – management
- Seon-hee at Style Floor – hair
- Shin Min – strings arrangement
- Shin Seok-cheol – drums
- Song Jin-seok – arranger, composer, strings arrangement
- Yoon Sa-ra – lyricist
- Yoong String – strings

== Charts ==
Weekly
Chart (2016)	Peak position
Gaon Album Chart	61
