= Maywish =

South Korean girl group

- Origin: Seoul, South Korea
- Genre: K-pop
- Years active: 2018–2019
- Label: J9 Entertainment
- Members: Anna; Jelly; HyoIn; SoEun

Maywish (Korean: 메이위시) is a South Korean girl group under J9 Entertainment. The group consist of four members: Anna, Jelly, HyoIn and SoEun. They debuted with their first single album Hello on October 17, 2018.

== History ==
On October 17, 2018, Maywish released their first single album Hello. On November 20, 2018, they performed their debut stage on SBS M's music show The Show. On December 19, 2018, Maywish won the "Best Dance Award" at the 2018 Green Earth G-Show Music Award.

== Members ==
- Anna (안나)
- Jelly (제령)
- HyoIn (효인)
- SoEun (소은)

== Discography ==
=== Single albums ===
Title	Album details
Hello	Released: October 17, 2018; Label: J9 Entertainment, Ogam Entertainment; Format: CD, digital download; Track listing: 1. Hello; 2. Hello (Inst.)
SRR	Released May 12, 2019; Label: J9 Entertainment; Format: Digital download

=== Singles ===
Title	Year	Album
"Hello"	2018	Hello
"SRR"	2019	SRR

== Filmography ==
=== Music videos ===
Year	Title
2018	"Hello"

=== Reality shows ===
Year	Network	Title	Role
2018	YouTube	Maywish Diary	Themselves

== Awards and nominations ==
=== Green Earth G-Show Music Award ===
Year	Nominee / work	Award	Result
2018	Maywish	Best Dance Award	Won
