= Saturday (group) =

South Korean girl group

- Origin: Seoul, South Korea
- Genres: K-pop
- Years active: 2018–2024
- Labels: SD Entertainment, Yoonso Group
- Past members: Juyeon; Chaewon; Chohee; Sion; Sunha; Haneul; Yuki; Ayeon; Minseo

Saturday (세러데이) is a South Korean girl group formed by SD Entertainment in 2018. The group debuted on July 18, 2018, with MMook JJi BBa., the group's last known lineup consists of Yuki, Ayeon and Minseo. In 2022, the building of SD Entertainment shut down, and in 2023 the group moved to Yoonso Group. As of 2024, it is not confirmed whether they disbanded or not.

== Members ==
=== Former ===
- Yuki (유키)
- Ayeon (아연)
- Minseo (민서)
- Chaewon (채원)
- Chohee (초희)
- Sion (시온)
- Sunha (선하)
- Haneul (하늘)
- Juyeon (주연)

== Discography ==
=== Single albums ===
Title	Album details	Peak chart positions	Sales
Title	Album details	KOR	Sales
MMook JJi BBa (묵찌빠)	Released: July 18, 2018; Label: SD Entertainment, Genie Music; Formats: CD, digital download	—	—N/a
Follow Saturday	Released: February 13, 2019; Label: SD Entertainment, Kakao M; Formats: CD, digital download	—	—N/a
IKYK	Released: September 19, 2019; Label: SD Entertainment, YG Plus; Formats: CD, digital download	31	KOR: 2,340
D.B.D.B.DIB	Released: August 3, 2020; Label: SD Entertainment; Formats: CD, digital download	26	KOR: 2,899
Only You	Released: January 22, 2021; Label: SD Entertainment; Formats: CD, digital download	40	KOR: 2,631
Find Summer	Released: July 25, 2023; Label: Yoonso Group; Formats: CD, digital download	–	—N/a

=== Singles ===
Title	Year	Peak chart positions	Sales (download)	Album
Title	Year	KOR	Sales (download)	Album
"MMook JJi BBa" (묵찌빠)	2018	—	—N/a	MMook JJi BBa (묵찌빠)
"In Your Eyes"	2018	—	—N/a	To Sunday Christmas
"WiFi" (와이파이)	2019	—	—N/a	Follow Saturday
"Gwiyomi Song (Saturday)" (귀요미송 (세러데이))	2019	—	—N/a	To Sunday Gwiyomi
"BByong" (뿅)	2019	—	—N/a	IKYK
"D.B.D.B.DIB"	2020	—	—N/a	D.B.D.B.DIB
"Only You"	2021	—	—N/a	Only You
"Stay" (있을게)	2023	—	—N/a	Find Summer
"—" denotes releases that did not chart or were not released in that region.

=== OSTs ===
Title	Year	Peak chart positions	Sales (download)	Album
Title	Year	KOR	Sales (download)	Album
"Little Star (Vocal Haneul, Yuki)"	2020	—	—N/a	Love Tampering Season 3 OST
"First Meeting" (첫 만남)	2021	—	—N/a	Love Tampering 2021 OST
"Come to Me" (첫다가와 줘)	2021	—	—N/a	Fragrant Coincidence OST Part.2
"—" denotes releases that did not chart or were not released in that region.
