= We Girls =

South Korean girl group

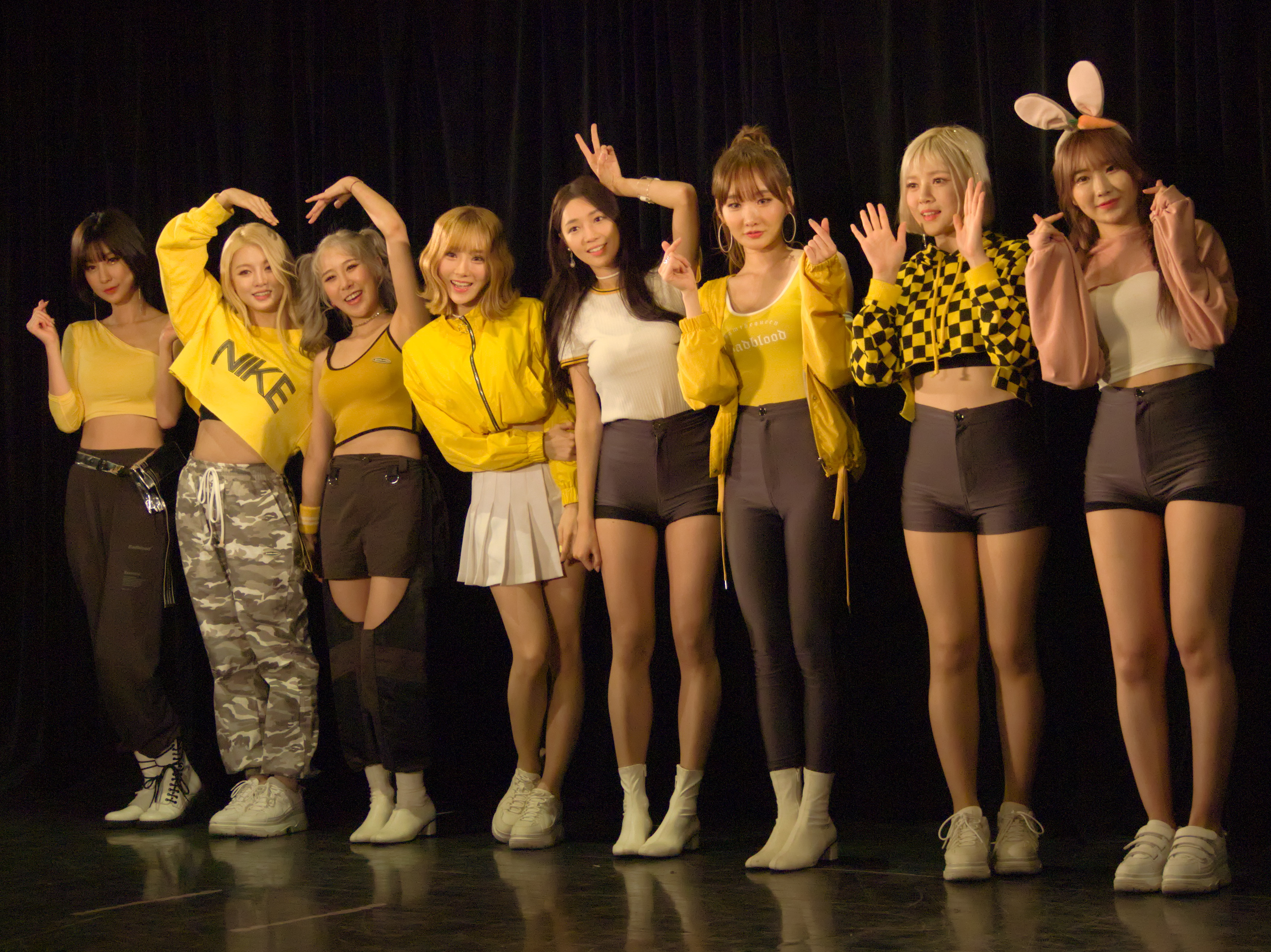
- We Girls in November 2018

Background information
- Origin: Seoul, South Korea
- Genre: K-pop
- Years active: 2018–2022
- Label: Aftermoon Entertainment
- Past members: see Members
- Website: aftermoonkorea.com/wegirls/

We Girls (Korean: 위걸스), also stylized WeGirls, was a South Korean girl group formed by Aftermoon Entertainment in Seoul, South Korea. The group debuted on August 31, 2018, with On Air. The group disbanded in early 2022 following over a year of inactivity.

== History ==
=== Formation and line-up changes ===
We Girls were announced through a crowdfunding website called Makestar on October 31, 2017. The Makestar participants were able to vote on which of the girls would be the leader of the group. The initial lineup consisted of nine members: Jaina, Hyeni, Yehana, Woori, Vivian, Julie, Hal Park, Lina, & Suha.

In 2017 and 2018, the group went through several lineup changes as Jaina, Woori, Vivian, Julie, Lina, and Suha left the group. A new member Cindy was added, but she also left the group. New members E.You, EunA, Ellie, JungA, & Nina were added, bringing the total number of members to six.

=== Debut and member changes ===
We Girls debuted on August 31, 2018, with the extended play On Air, consisting of three tracks" We Go", "On Air" and "SelfieGram". The mini-album was produced by House Rulez. The album reached 43 on the Gaon chart. On October 9, they released a single called "Girls Wings Fly", which was a version of "On Air" for their fan group Wings.

In February 2019 Hal announced her departure from the group to focus on her acting career, while Hyeni left the group in June of that year without giving a reason as to why, in October 2019 the group released their second EP Ride.

The group promoted their EP at KSTAGEO in Tokyo from November 2–4.

In December 2019, it was announced that EunA had also left the group.

=== Members changes and disbandment ===
On July 13, 2020, We Girls announced on their Instagram that Ellie and Nina had left the group after their contracts had expired, and they were looking for new members. Soon afterwards they announced the new members via their initials - "D", then "A", "Y", "S", "R", and lastly "K". "K" was revealed to be former Bulldok member Kimi, and "D" was Do Hayoon. "Y" and "R" were revealed as Yerim and Rhai, but no information about these members was given beyond their names, while "A" and "S" were never officially announced. Former Midnight member Byeoljji was also revealed to be joining the group.

Shortly afterwards, the group's social media abruptly went silent, with their only posts being about Yehana's solo debut in 2021.

In March 2022, Yehana confirmed to fans via her Instagram that the group had disbanded.

== Members ==
Final line-up

- Yehana (예하나)
- Han JungA (한정아)
- Kimi (키미)
- Byeoljji (별찌)
- Do Hayoon (도하윤)
- Rhai (라이)
- Yerim (예림)

Former members

- Ellie (엘리)
- Nina (니나)
- HaL (하엘)
- Hyeni (혜니)
- EunA (은아)
- E.You (이유)

== Discography ==
=== Extended plays ===
Title	Album details	Peak chart positions	Sales
Title	Album details	KOR	Sales
On Air	Released: August 31, 2018; Label: Aftermoon Entertainment, Soribada; Formats: CD, digital download	43	KOR: 704
Ride	Released: September 6, 2019; Label: Aftermoon Entertainment, NHN Bugs; Formats: CD, digital download	48	KOR: 343

=== Singles ===
- "On Air" (2018)
- "Girls Wings Fly" (2018)
- "Ride" (2019)

== Awards ==
=== KY Star Awards ===
Year	Recipient	Award name	Date	Ref.
2018	"위걸스 (We Girls)"	아이돌 유망주 부문 (Rising Star Award)	November 26	
