= Wishes (Voisper album) =

Studio album by Voisper
- Released: November 20, 2018
- Recorded: 2017–2018
- Genre: R&B
- Length: 45:59
- Language: Korean
- Label: Evermore Music

Voisper chronology
Voice + Whisper (2016)	Wishes (2018)	The Finale (2021)

Singles from Wishes
- 1. "Goodbye to Goodbye" Released: November 20, 2018

Wishes is the first studio album by South Korean vocal group Voisper. It was released on November 20, 2018, by Evermore Music and distributed by NHN Bugs. The quartet worked on the album for a year; a series of a singles were released between the album's development, two of which—"Missing U" and "I Believe"—were included on the physical disc as the final two tracks.

Wishes and its lead single "Goodbye to Goodbye" were concurrently released. Voisper held a showcase for the album and the group began promoting the record by performing on music chart programs across various television networks.

== Background and recording ==
In crafting Wishes, Kangsan wanted to demonstrate the distinction in Voisper's maturity between its formation in high school to the members' ages as they approach their mid-20s. The album was conceived and completed within the span of one year, exceeding the anticipated completion timeline by three to four months. Various tracks were re-recorded to "improve their completeness". In revising the track "Break Up", Daegwang sang in a higher tone than originally intended. Kwangho made the effort to sing in numerous vocal tones throughout the album. Leading up to the recording of "Greetings", Choonggi came down with a cold, which he attributes to being able to deliver a vocal performance better suited for the song's sentiment.

== Music structure ==
An R&B album, Wishes incorporates pop, pop rock, and soul pop into its sound. Lyrically, the album's themes revolve around experiences of youth: life and memories, love and partings, and dreams and hopes. The record opens with "Ordinary Words", a love story with "warm and appealingly heavy" vocals. It is followed by "Goodbye to Goodbye", a ballad that consists of "strong harmonies". A song about pursuing one's passion and the "positive energy" from the weather, "Fine Day" incorporates elements of rock music. "Left Hand, Right Hand" is an R&B ballad. "Break Up" deals with bearing the feelings of ending a relationship.

In "Greetings", the narrator laments the occasional desire to contact a former partner. Written by members Kangsan and Choonggi, the former stated that the track describes the "bitter feelings" which stem from the situation. "Memory" is an R&B ballad. A song targeting couples, "Christmas Talk" is a "tender" love song with "sweet" vocals for the Christmas season. "Reminiscence Collection" utilizes a "trendy" arrangement and "Can't Let the Curtain Fall" delivers a message of hope. Kangsan sought to pen a song with relatable lyrics. The album closes with a pair of mid-tempo R&B tracks; "I Believe" is a "soulful" song influenced by Motown and "Missing U" is about "warm recollections" of a former love.

== Release and promotion ==
Preceding the release of the album, "Missing U" and "I Believe" were digitally distributed as stand-alone singles in January and August 2018, respectively. Having debuted two years and eight months earlier, Wishes was reported as Voisper's first studio album on November 7. A portrait of the quartet and individual members were published alongside the announcement. A lyric teaser image for each member of the group was published two days later. "Goodbye to Goodbye" was revealed as the lead single. A highlight medley of the album tracks was shared on November 14. A music video teaser for "Goodbye to Goodbye" was uploaded four days prior to the album's release date.

Hosted by MC Dingdong, Voisper held a showcase for Wishes one hour prior to its release at the Ilchi Art Hall in Cheongdam-dong, a ward in the Gangnam District of Seoul. The album and music video for "Goodbye to Goodbye" were simultaneously released on November 20. The group began promoting the single later that day by performing it on SBS MTV's music chart show The Show. Voisper made a followup performance on KBS2's Music Bank.

== Track listing ==
Track listing
No.	Title	Lyrics	Music	Arrangement	Length
1.	"Ordinary Words" (세상에서 가장 흔한 말; Sesangeseo Gajang Heunhal Mal)	Kiggen, Kim Jin-sol, Jung Shin-hae	Kim Jin-sol	Kiggen, Kim Jin-sol	4:05
2.	"Goodbye to Goodbye"	Lee Hyo-seok, Kang Han	Lee Hyo-seok	Reproject, Lee Hyo-seok	3:53
3.	"Fine Day" (날씨가 좋다; Nalssiga Jota)	Kang Han	ZigZagNote	ZigZagNote	3:25
4.	"Left Hand, Right Hand" (왼손, 오른손; Oenson, Oreunson)	Kang Han	Lee Hyo-seok	Song Seong-gyeong	3:59
5.	"Break Up"	Kim Cheon-il	Kim Cheon-il	Park Dong-il, Choi Ga-ram	3:59
6.	"Greetings" (작은 안부; Jageun Anbu)	Kim Kang-san, Min Choong-ki	Kim Kang-san, Min Choong-ki	Captain Planet	4:01
7.	"Memory" (기억; Gieok)	ZigZagNote	ZigZagNote	ZigZagNote	3:45
8.	"Christmas Talk"	Lee Shin-seong	Captain Planet	Captain Planet	3:16
9.	"Reminiscence Collection" (추억 Collection; Chueok Collection)	Gamdongis, ROZ, Seo Jae-ha	Gamdongis, ROZ, Seo Jae-ha	Gamdongis, ROZ, Seo Jae-ha	3:42
10.	"Can't Let the Curtain Fall" (가야만 해; Gayaman Hae)	Kim Kang-san, Lee Seung-eun, Aivan	Kim Kang-san	Park Dong-il, Choi Ga-ram	4:26
11.	"I Believe" (CD only)	Gamdongis, ROZ, Ki Hyeon-seok	Gamdongis, ROZ, Ki Hyeon-seok	Gamdongis, ROZ, Ki Hyeon-seok	3:49
12.	"Missing U" (꺼내보면; Kkeonaebomyeon) (CD only)	Gamdongis, ROZ, Ki Hyeon-seok	Gamdongis, ROZ, Ki Hyeon-seok	Gamdongis, ROZ, Ki Hyeon-seok	3:39
Total length:					45:59

== Charts ==
Chart (2018)	Peak position
Gaon Album Chart	85
