= NTB (band) =

2018–2021 South Korean boy band

- Also known as: Naughty Boys (2016-2017)
- Origin: Seoul, South Korea
- Genres: K-pop; Dance-pop
- Years active: 2018–2021; 2024—present
- Labels: High Choice Entertainment
- Members: L.Min; Seowoong; G.O
- Past members: Youngbo; Jaeha; Hyobin

NTB (Hangul: 엔티비) was a South Korean boy band formed by High Choice Entertainment in Seoul, South Korea. The group debuted on May 28, 2018 with Dramatic.

On February 28, 2021, High Choice announced that the group had disbanded following their last online fanmeeting, which was held on March 27, 2021.

On September 24, 2024, the group announced their reformation as a trio, consisting of G.O, L.Min and Sungwoong, for their concert Join Us in Japan.

On December 11, 2024, the members started teasing an NTB comeback with a track titled "Dopamine" on their Instagram accounts.

== Members ==
- L.Min (엘민)
- Seowoong (서웅)
- G.O (지오)
- Youngbo (영보)
- Jaeha (재하)
- Hyobin (효빈)

== Discography ==
=== Extended plays ===
Title	Album details	Peak chart positions	Sales
Title	Album details	KOR	Sales
Dramatic	Released: May 28, 2018; Label: High Choice Entertainment, Interpark Music; Formats: CD, digital download	16	KOR: 1,499

=== Singles ===
Title	Year	Album
Naughty Boys
"DanCin'derella/Step By Step" (Japanese)	2016	Non-album singles
"L.O.V.E" (Japanese)	2017	Non-album singles
NTB
"Dramatic"	2018	Dramatic
"Dopamine"	2025	Dopamine
"—" denotes releases that did not chart or were not released in that region.
