= Target (South Korean band) =

South Korean boy band

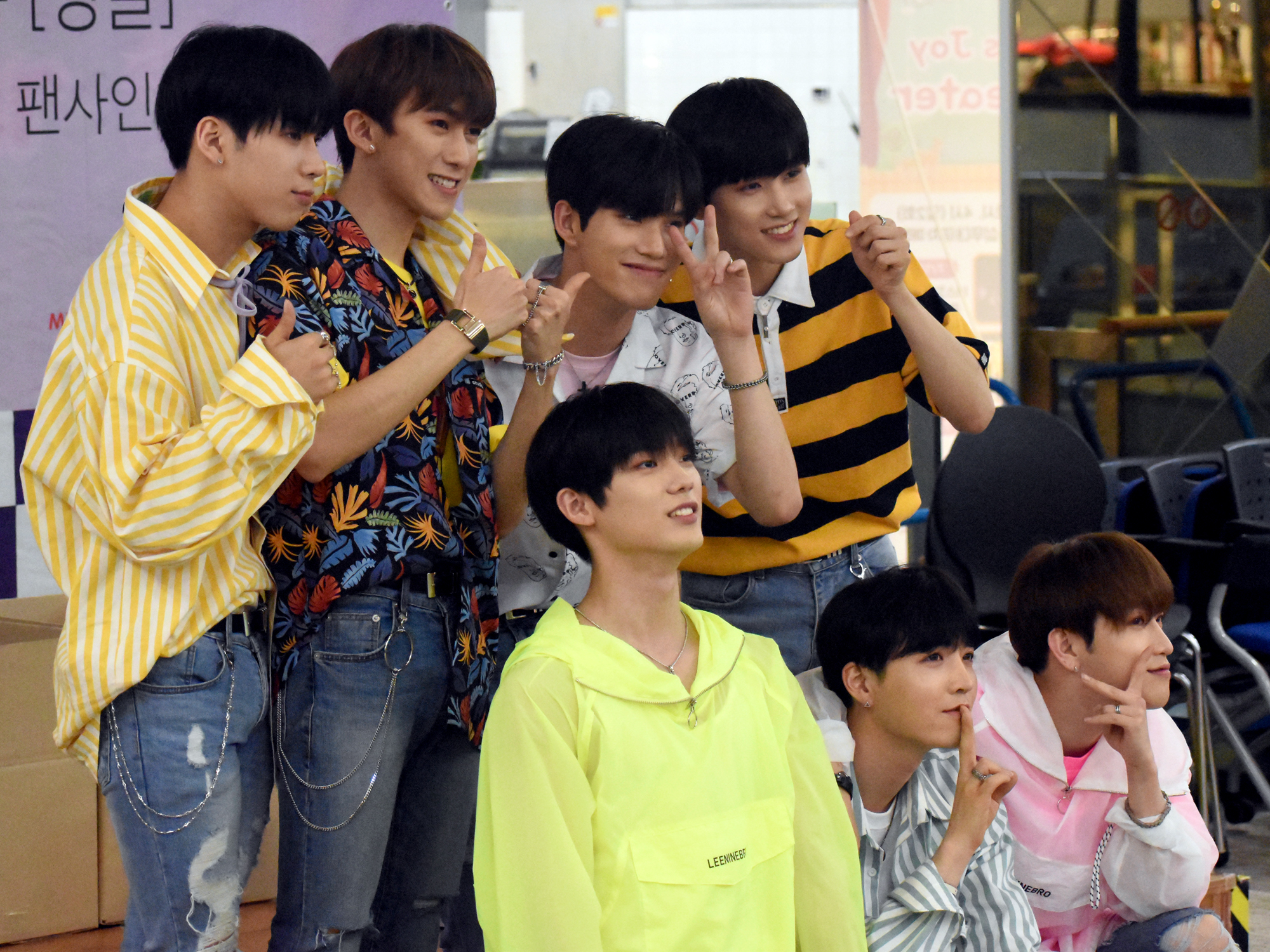
- Target at an autograph event at the Gimpo International Airport Lotte Mall, July 2018

Background information
- Origin: Seoul, South Korea
- Genres: K-pop; Dance-pop
- Years active: 2018–2020
- Label: JSL Company
- Members: G.I; Zeth; Hyun; Roi
- Past members: Seulchan; Boun; Woojin

Target (Korean: 타겟) is a South Korean boy band formed by JSL Company in Seoul, South Korea. The group consists of four members. They group debuted on January 24, 2018 with Alive.

== Members ==
Current Members

- G.I (지아이)
- Zeth (제스)
- Hyun (현)
- Roi (로이)

Former Members

- Seulchan (슬찬)
- Boun (바운)
- Woojin (우진)

== Discography ==
=== Extended plays ===
Title	Details	Peak chart positions	Sales
Title	Details	KOR	Sales
Alive	Released: January 24, 2018; Label: JSL Company, Music&NEW; Formats: CD, digital download	6	KOR: 11,336

=== Single albums ===
Title	Details	Peak chart positions	Sales
Title	Details	KOR	Sales
Please Love Me	Released: September 3, 2014; Label: JSL Company, Music&NEW; Formats: digital download	-	-
Block	Released: April 7, 2017; Label: JSL Company, Music&NEW; Formats: CD, digital download	-	-
Is It True	Released: July 9, 2018; Label: JSL Company, Music&NEW; Formats: CD, digital download	13	KOR: 4,791
Popeye (Japan)	Released: February 6, 2019; Label: JSL Company, Music&NEW; Formats: CD, digital download	-	-
M The M	Released: April 22, 2019; Label: JSL Company, Music&NEW; Formats: CD, digital download	34	KOR: 1,092
S the P : Story The Planet	Released: August 19, 2019; Label: JSL Company, Music&NEW; Formats: CD, digital download	47	-

=== Singles ===
Title	Year	Album
"Please Love Me" (pre-debut)	2014	Non-album single
"Awake"	2018	Alive
"Is It True"	2018	Is It True
"Beautiful"	2019	M The M
"Baby Come Back Home"	2019	S The P
Japanese
"Atsui Omoi"	2017	Block
"Popeye"	2019	Popeye
"—" denotes releases that did not chart or were not released in that region.
