= Voisper =

South Korean vocal group

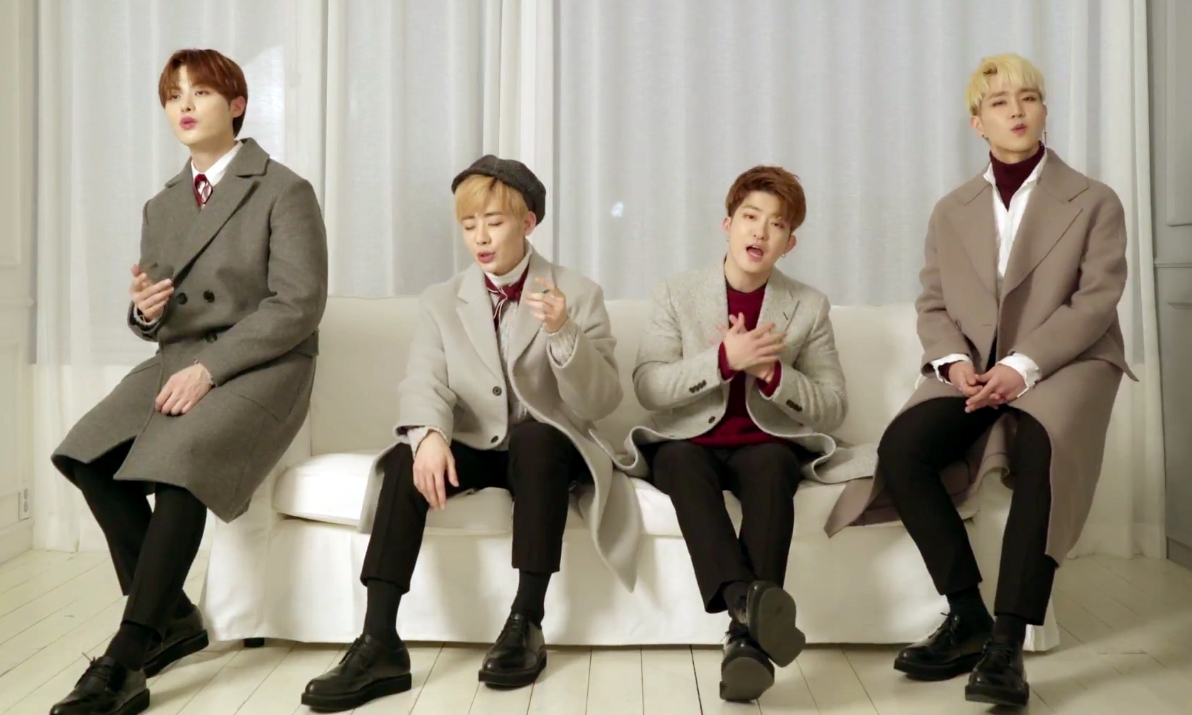
- Voisper in its live music video for "Missing U", 2018; L–R: Choonggi, Kwangho, Daegwang, Kangsan

Background information
- Also known as: North Incheon Nineteen
- Origin: Incheon, South Korea
- Genre: R&B
- Years active: 2016–2021
- Label: Evermore Music
- Past members: Daegwang; Kwangho; Kangsan; Choonggi
- Website: evermoremusic.co

Voisper (Korean: 보이스퍼; stylized in all caps) was a South Korean vocal group formed in Incheon. It consisted of vocalists Daegwang, Kwangho, Kangsan, and Choonggi, all of whom became friends in high school. After auditioning on Superstar K6 in 2014 as North Incheon Nineteen, the group was signed to Evermore Music the following January. A portmanteau of the words "voice" and "whisper", the quartet released its first mini-album Voice + Whisper in November 2016. The group disbanded of December 8, 2021 after releasing their last album The Finale.

== History ==
=== 2014–2016: Formation and debut ===
Friends since entering high school, Jung Dae-gwang, Jung Kwang-ho, Kim Kang-san, and Min Choong-gi came together during their second year. Kim proposed to make a group together, which the other three accepted. The quartet first appeared on the sixth season of Mnet's talent show series Superstar K under the name North Incheon Nineteen.

The ensemble signed a contract with Evermore Music in January 2015. To showcase its maturity since partaking in Superstar K, the group name was changed to Voisper. A portmanteau of the words "voice" and "whisper", its formation was announced on February 16, 2016, with a tentative debut towards the end of the month. The group made its first performance on SBS MTV's music program The Show on February 23, where it performed the debut single "In Your Voice". The song was made available on online music stores on March 2. Voisper released its second single "Summer Cold" on June 17. In precedence of its first mini-album, Voisper released its third single "Heart" on October 6. Voice + Whisper and the lead single "Learn to Love" were simultaneously released on November 18.

=== 2017–2021: Wishes, The Finale, and disbandment ===
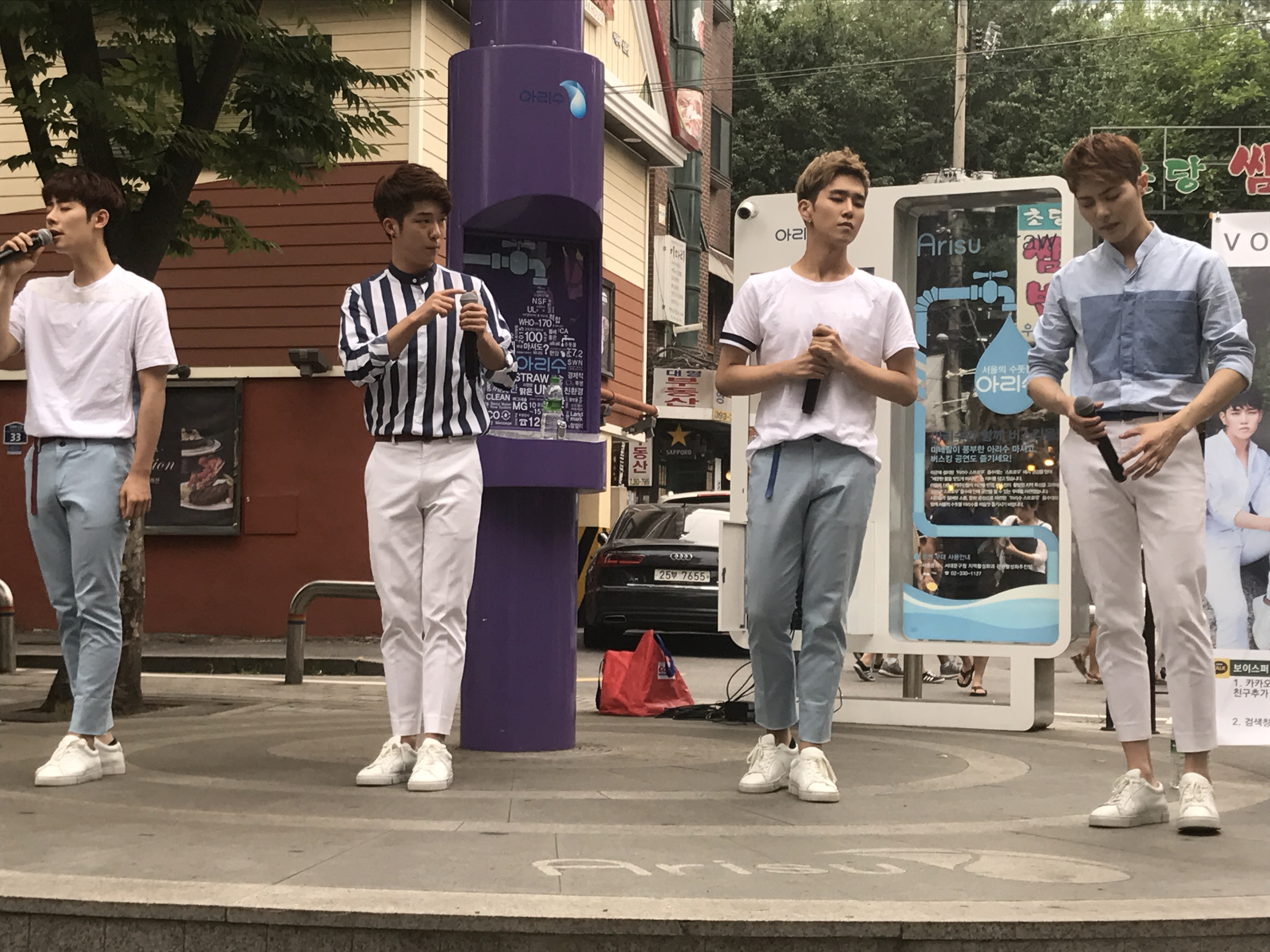
Voisper busking on Arisu Stage in Sinchon, 2017

Voisper participated in the music competition series Immortal Songs: Singing the Legend, making its first appearance covering Kim Jong-chan's "You're Crying Too" on February 25, 2017. They went on to appear on the show a total of seven times that year, winning first place for their performance with Jung Dongha on the June 24 episode and getting their first solo win on the October 28 episode.

On July 13, Voisper released its fourth single "Crush on You". It also included a remake of the 1987 song "Days Gone By" by Yoo Jae-ha. It was followed by the group's fifth single "Save As", released on October 29. Voisper also released "Let's Not Ask" on December 4, the first installment for the original soundtrack of television series Two Cops (2017). On January 6, 2018, Voisper released the single "Missing U". Voisper 1st Whisper, the group's first concert, was held at the Veloso venue in Hongdae, Seoul, on May 12. The quartet released its first studio album Wishes in November 2018.

Voisper disbanded after releasing their final album entitled The Finale on December 8.

== Musical style and influences ==
Voisper is primarily an R&B group, but has expressed its desire to showcase musical diversity. Its debut single "In Your Voice" is an R&B song that consists of a "dreamlike" melody, accompanied by a "sweet" piano and "powerful" drum. A ballad, the followup "Summer Cold" combines an acoustic guitar with a piano. On Voice + Whisper, the record opens with the dance track "On & On", which incorporates modern rock and electronic music into its sound. The quartet has cited Sweet Sorrow, Noel, and Brown Eyed Soul as role models. American boy group Boyz II Men, Jung Dong-ha, and Kim Bada were also highlighted as inspirations.

== Members ==
- Daegwang – leader, main vocalist
- Kwangho – main vocalist
- Kangsan – main vocalist
- Choonggi – main vocalist

== Discography ==
=== Albums ===
==== Studio albums ====
Title	Album details	Peak chart positions
Title	Album details	KOR
Wishes	Released: November 20, 2018; Label: Evermore Music; Format: CD, digital download	85

==== Extended plays ====
Title	Album details	Peak chart positions
Title	Album details	KOR
Voice + Whisper	Released: November 18, 2016; Label: Evermore Music; Format: CD, digital download	61
The Finale	Released: December 8, 2021; Label: Evermore Music; Format: CD, digital download	—

=== Singles ===
Title	Year	Album
"In Your Voice" (그대 목소리로 말해줘; Geudae moksoriro malhaejwo)	2016	Voice + Whisper
"Summer Cold" (여름감기; Yeoreumgamgi)	2016	Voice + Whisper
"Heart" (넌 지금 어디에; Neon jigeum eodie; 'Where Are You Now') (featuring Jeon Mi-ri)	2016	Voice + Whisper
"Learn to Love" (어쩌니; Eojjeoni)	2016	Voice + Whisper
"Crush on You" (반했나봐; Banhaennabwa)	2017	Non-album singles
"Save As" (다른 이름으로 저장하기; Dareun ireumeuro jeojanghagi)	2017	Non-album singles
"Missing U" (꺼내보면; Kkeonaebomyeon)	2018	Non-album singles
"I Believe"	2018	Non-album singles
"Goodbye to Goodbye"	2018	Wishes
"Lovesome" (우리 꼭 사귀는 것 같잖아요; Uri kkok sagwineun geot gatjanayo) (featuring Yoon Chae-kyung of April)	2019	Non-album singles
"Keep Going"	2020	Non-album singles
"The Day" (그날; Geunal)	2020	Non-album singles
"This Is the Day" (말할까봐; Malhalkkabwa)	2021	The Finale

=== Soundtrack appearances ===
Title	Year	Album
"Let's Not Ask" (묻지 말기로 해; mutji malgiro hae)	2017	Two Cops OST

=== Guest appearances ===
Title	Year	Other performer(s)	Album	Ref.
"Fly Again"	2016	Jung Dong-ha	Dream – Special Edition	
