= M1112 (4colors) =

EP by D-Crunch
- Released: November 12, 2018
- Genre: Hip hop
- Length: 20:35
- Language: Korean
- Label: All-S Company
- Producers: Lee Jong-seok (exec.), Playkid

D-Crunch chronology
0806 (2018)	M1112 (4colors) (2018)	M0527 (2019)

Singles from M1112 (4colors)
- 1. "Stealer" Released: November 12, 2018

M1112 (4colors) is the first mini-album by South Korean idol group D-Crunch. It was released on November 12, 2018, by All-S Company and distributed by Kakao M. The record compromises various hip hop songs, headed by lead single "Stealer".

M1112 (4colors) and "Stealer" were concurrently released. D-Crunch held a showcase for the album and the group began promoting the song by performing on music chart programs across various television networks. The single album peaked at number 39 on South Korea's national Gaon Album Chart, where it has shifted over 1,000 copies since its release.

== Background and music structure ==
M1112 (4colors) contains a spectrum of hip hop music, from "deep" to trendy. By early October 2018, D-Crunch had completed 80% of its first mini-album and was scheduled to be released the following month. O.V compared the record to rainbow rice cake due to the numerous "colors" found in the tracks. Hyunwook noted the contrast in style and concept from 0806.

M1112 (4colors) opens with "I Miss You", where the lyrics express D-Crunch's feelings to its fans. "Stealer" is a hip-hop song based in electronic dance music with an orchestra session. Conceptually, the song is about "thieves who steal everything". The lyrics assert the group's "ambitious message to head to the top". O.V characterized the song as "more explosive" than the group's debut single and predecessor "Palace", also describing it as "exceptional and intense". He implemented a siren sound to raise its "sense of urgency". Dylan called it an "upgrade" with more energy. "I'm OK" is a "warm" track for the autumn and winter seasons. Described as an "emotional healing song", the group looks back on its days as trainees and vocalist Hyunwook sings the climax is a high pitch. "Now" has a "refined groove".

== Release and promotion ==
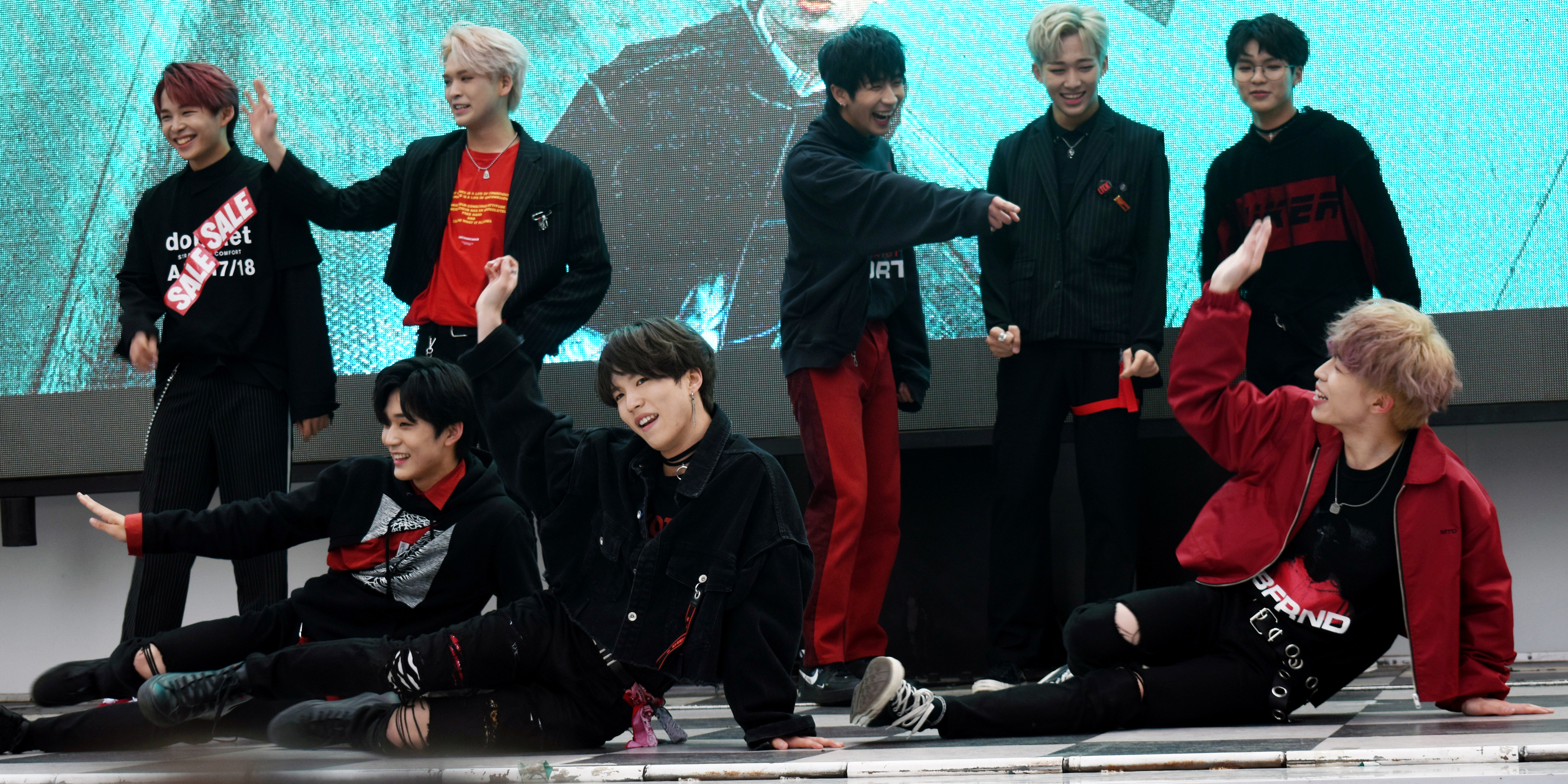
D-Crunch busking in Myeong-dong, November 18, 2018

On October 28, D-Crunch's first mini-album was announced through a video documenting each member in a recording studio. Beginning on October 31, black-and-white profile images of each group member were released for three consecutive days in batches of three: Hyunoh, Hyunwook, and Minhyuk; Hyunho, O.V, and Hyunwoo; and Chanyoung, Dylan, and Jungseung. A group concept photo, showing the members with "trendy" hair colors and donning street fashion in a green-lit room, was released on November 5. The color contrast between the profile and group photos signified D-Crunch's ability to "show its own colors and sounds" when together. Directed by Kim Jong-wan, a music video teaser for "Stealer" followed four days later.

M1112 (4colors) and the music video for "Stealer" were simultaneously released on November 12. Hosted by MC Dingdong, D-Crunch held a showcase for the mini-album at the Yes24 MUV Hall in the Mapo District in Seoul. D-Crunch began promoting "Stealer" the following day by performing it on SBS MTV's music chart show The Show. The group made additional performances on MBC Music's Show Champion, Munhwa Broadcasting Corporation's Show! Music Core, KBS2's Music Bank, Seoul Broadcasting System's (SBS) Inkigayo, and Mnet's M Countdown. The group performed "Stealer" as well as various cover songs and dances on MBC Standard FM's radio show Idol Radio. D-Crunch also promoted the mini-album by busking in Myeong-dong. On December 17, D-Crunch prepared autographed albums and made a surprise visit to Jinsun Girls' Middle School in Gangnam, where they performed "Stealer" and interacted with the students. Promotions for the record were completed on January 16, 2019.

== Commercial performance ==
On the chart dated November 11–17, 2018, M1112 (4colors) debuted at number 39 on South Korea's national Gaon Album Chart. By the end of the month, it shifted 1,487 units domestically.

== Track listing ==
Track listing
No.	Title	Lyrics	Music	Arrangement	Length
1.	"I Miss You" (보고싶게; Bogoshipge)	G.I.G	G.I.G, Playkid, Melody Workshop, Dubbly	Playkid, Melody Workshop, Dubbly	3:42
2.	"Stealer"	G.I.G	G.I.G, Renziee	Renziee	4:41
3.	"I'm OK"	G.I.G	G.I.G, Playkid, Melody Workshop	Playkid, Melody Workshop	4:05
4.	"Now" (지금; Jigeum)	G.I.G	G.I.G, Playkid, Dubbly	Playkid, Dubbly	3:26
5.	"Stealer"		G.I.G, Renziee	Renziee	4:41
Total length:					20:35

== Credits ==
Credits adapted from the mini-album's liner notes.

- Bae So-woon – fan marketing
- Baek Ji-a – make-up artist
- Chanyoung – choreographer
- Dubbly – composer, arranger
- G.I.G – lyricist, composer, music director
- Gi Sang-su – photographer
- Gyu-cheol – choreographer
- Hyeong-seop – choreographer
- Hyunoh – choreographer
- Jang Gi-hyeon – photographer
- Jang Se-hwan – manufacture
- Jang Se-jin – stylist
- Jeon Hyeon-kyeong – A&R
- Jin Su-min – hair designer
- Jung Hye-won – artist management
- Kim Ji-yeong – stylist
- Kim Yu-jeong – album design
- Lee Ha-jeong – stylist
- Lee Han-seon – stylist
- Lee Jong-seok – executive producer
- Lee Woo-yong – video contents
- Melody Workshop – composer, arranger
- Na Sang-cheon – marketing director
- O.V – choreographer
- Park Ga-eun – fan marketing
- Park Sang-mu – photographer
- Playkid – composer, arranger, record producer, music director
- Renziee – composer, arranger
- Seo Hee-ji – stylist
- Seo Hye-mi – PR & communications
- Seung-rae – choreographer
- Shin Jeong-woo – artist management
- Shin Seong-shik – artist management
- Yoon Heung-kwan – management director

== Chart ==
Chart (2018)	Peak position
Gaon Album Chart	39
