= NeonPunch =

South Korean girl group (2018–2020)

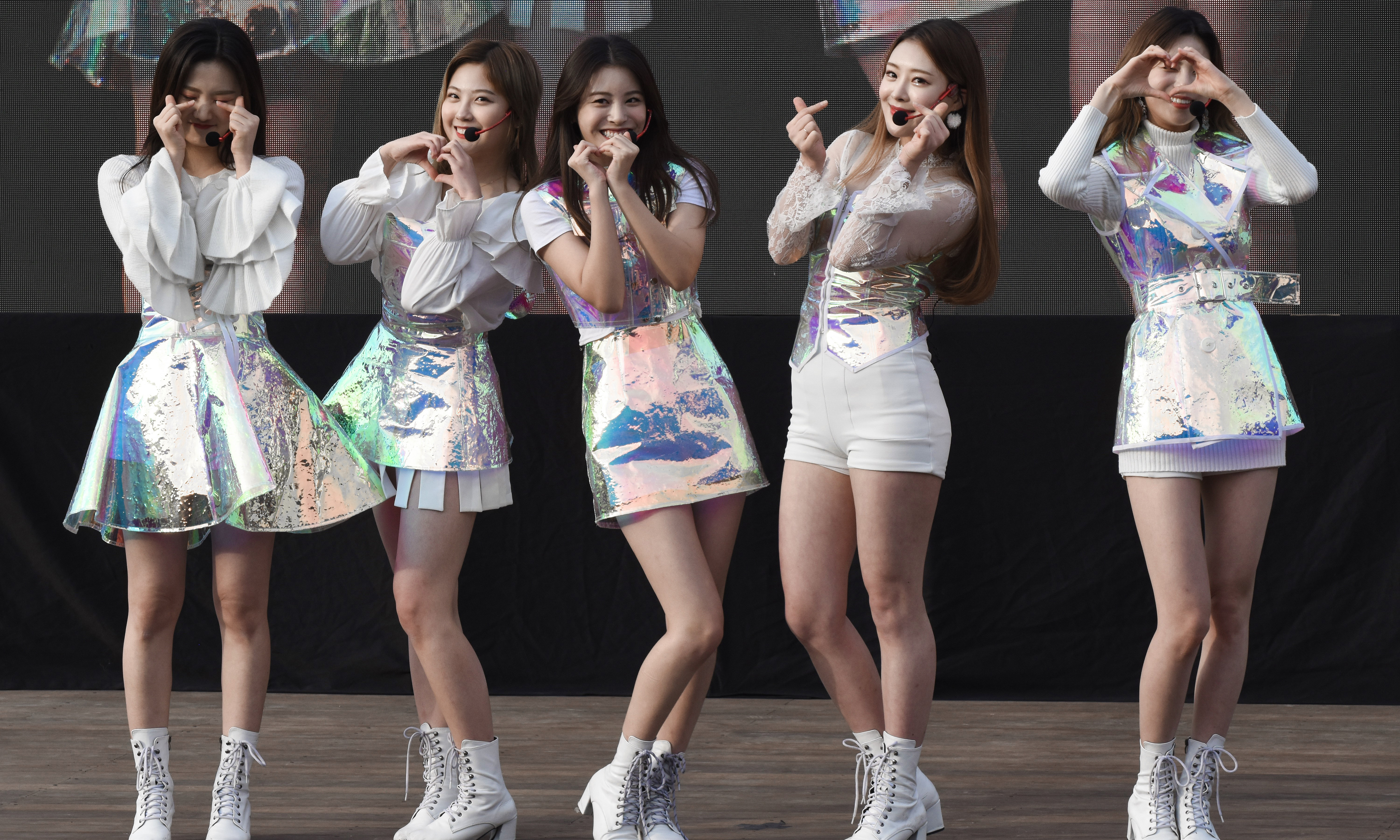
- NeonPunch performing at the 4th Happy Festival of Urban Kids, November 2019

Background information
- Origin: Seoul, South Korea
- Genres: K-pop
- Years active: 2018–2020
- Labels: A100
- Past members: Dayeon; Terry; Baekah; May; Iaan; Dohee
- Website: neon-punch.com

NeonPunch (Korean: 네온펀치) was a South Korean girl group formed by A100 Entertainment. The lineup originally consisted of Dayeon, Terry, Baekah, May, and Iaan, and they released their debut mini-album Moonlight on June 27, 2018. Terry left the group the following January and was replaced by Dohee. NeonPunch released their second and final mini-album Watch Out January 30, 2019, and disbanded on August 11, 2020.

== History ==
=== 2017–2018: Formation and debut ===
On February 7, 2017, A100 Entertainment announced that they would be doing their first girl group project via their YouTube channel and started uploading covers of the group. There was a various number of members throughout the project that were always masked and kept their identities a secret while they did the covers. The number of members changed until only five members remained and they formed the final line-up. On October 2, A100 announced that their girl group will be named NeonPunch and introduced the members through a teaser for their pre-debut reality show. The members were Dayeon, Hajeong, Baekah, Arang, and Iaan. NeonPunch auditioned for JTBC's reality show, Mix Nine, but only Baekah passed the audition stage and made it onto the show.

On April 13, 2018, A100 announced that NeonPunch would be the new model for Beauty brand DPC. The members of the group were Baekah, Dayeon, and Iaan with new members May and Terry. The group was stated to debut at the end of May. On May 8, A100 announced that the debut was postponed to June, and the five members Baekah, Dayeon, Iaan, May and Terry were confirmed as the final members of NeonPunch.

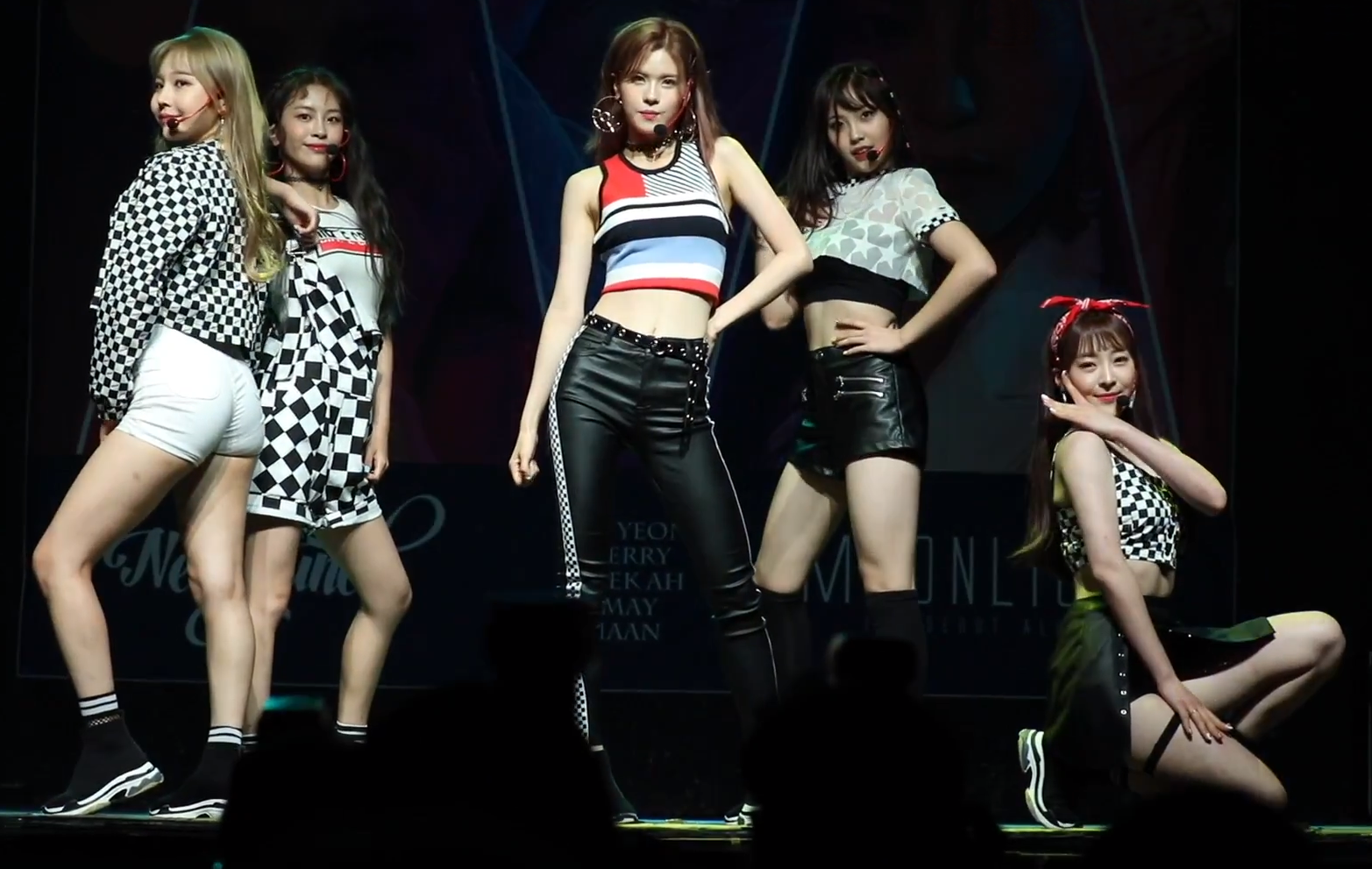
NeonPunch performing "Moonlight" in June 2018; from left: Terry, Iaan, Dayeon, May, Baekah

On June 27, 2018, NeonPunch released their first single album, Moonlight, along with the eponymous lead single. On June 30, they made their official debut stage on the music program MBC's Show! Music Core. On October 4, A100 announced that Terry had taken a break for personal reasons and had not explained anything further.

=== 2019–2020: Watch Out and disbandment ===
On January 16, 2019, A100 had revealed that Terry would permanently leave the group for health reasons. In her stead, new member Dohee joined the group prior to the group's January comeback. On January 30, NeonPunch released their second mini album Watch Out and its lead single "Tic Toc".

On August 11, 2020, A100 Entertainment announced that NeonPunch had disbanded, due in part to the label's financial hardships exacerbated by the ongoing COVID-19 pandemic. Shortly after, it was announced by the label that Dayeon, Baekah, and Iaan would be debuting as a trio named XUM on August 25. The debut was delayed to September 24, after one of their staff members had come into contact with someone who had COVID-19. The group XUM later disbanded on June 1, 2021.

== Members ==
- Dayeon (다연) – leader (2018–2020)
- Terry (테리) (2018–2019)
- Baekah (백아) (2018–2020)
- May (메이) (2018–2020)
- Iaan (이안) (2018–2020)
- Dohee (도희) (2019–2020)

== Discography ==
=== Extended plays ===
Title	Album details	Peak chart positions	Sales
Title	Album details	KOR	Sales
Moonlight	Released: June 27, 2018; Label: A100 Entertainment, Genie Music; Format: CD, digital download; Track listing: 1. Moonlight; 2. Moonlight (CHN Ver.); 3. Moon Light (Inst.)	37	—
Watch Out	Released: January 30, 2019; Label: A100 Entertainment, Genie Music; Format: CD, digital download; Track listing: 1. Watch Out (Intro); 2. Tic Toc; 3. Like it 4. Goodbye; 5. My Friends	45	KOR: 582

=== Singles ===
Title	Year	Album
"Moonlight"	2018	Moonlight
"Tic Toc"	2019	Watch Out

== Awards and nominations ==
Year	Nominee / work	Award	Result	Ref.
2019	NeonPunch	25th Korean Entertainment Arts Awards – Female Rookie of the Year Award	Won	
