= 0806 =

Debut single album by D-Crunch

Single album by D-Crunch
- Released: August 6, 2018
- Genre: Hip hop
- Length: 12:43
- Language: Korean
- Label: All-S Company; Kakao M
- Producer: Lee Jong-seok (exec.), Renziee

D-Crunch chronology
0806 (2018)	M1112 (4colors) (2018)

Singles from 0806
- 1. "Palace" Released: August 6, 2018

0806 is the debut single album by South Korean idol group D-Crunch, released on August 6, 2018 alongside its lead single "Palace" by All-S Company and distributed by Kakao M.

D-Crunch held a showcase for the album and the group began promoting the song by performing on music chart programs across various television networks. The single album peaked at number 46 on South Korea's national Circle Album Chart, where it has shifted over 1,000 copies since its release.

== Background and music structure ==
D-Crunch was created by Lee Jong-seok under All-S Company and formally announced as a nine-member hip-hop group on July 4, 2018. The group members contributed to the lyrics, composition, and rapping on its tracks, and were also involved in crafting the choreography of the songs. Comprising members O.V, Hyunwook, and Hyunoh, the songwriting team G.I.G provided the lyrics and composition to D-Crunch's debut single. To differentiate D-Crunch from other idol groups, O.V decided to debut with a "fierce" hip hop track to leave an impression on the general public. Recording for 0806 took place at All-S Studio; it was mixed and mastered at FoaL Sound.

The lead single "Palace" is a "cinematic" hip hop song which utilizes "heavy" sub-bass and a trap beat layered over an orchestra section. O.V stated that the track illustrates "dark and mischievous" hip hop. The lyrics deal with "breaking out of fear and thrill to take the first step into the world". The track "overflows with power" and "intense rapping" is employed. For its visual concept, D-Crunch sported all-black waterproof tech wear. In contrast to the single, the second track "I Want" showcases a "refreshing and cute charm". It was described as the "heart-changing song of busy contemporary men". D-Crunch included musically different songs to demonstrate its versatility. The single album's title of 0806 refers to the group's debut date.

== Release and promotion ==
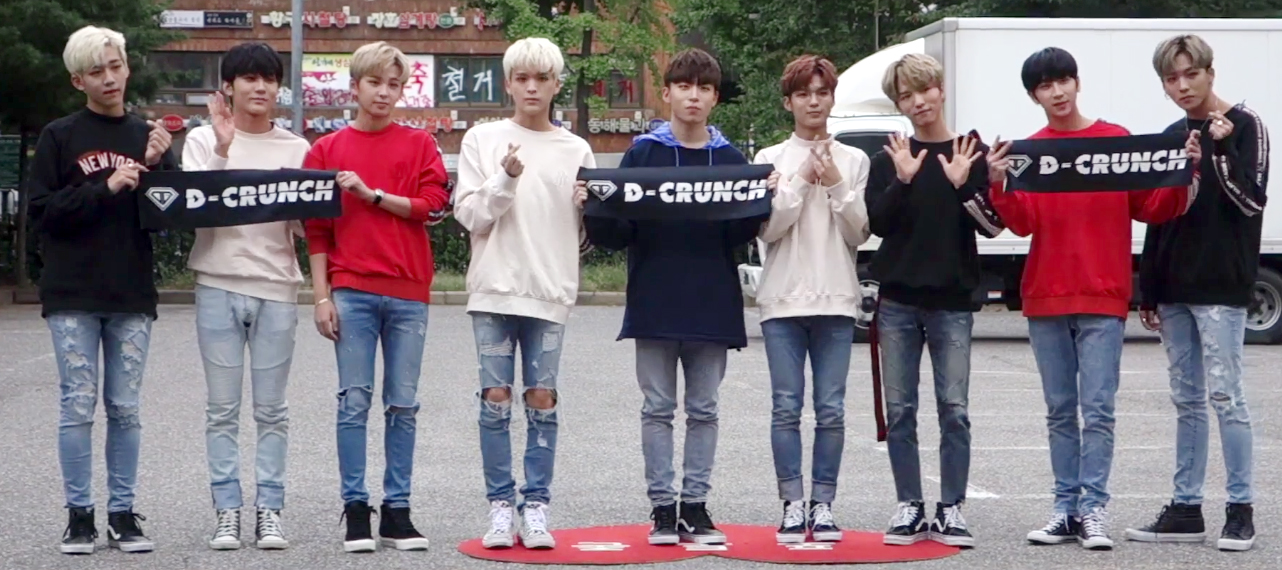
D-Crunch headed to Music Bank recording, September 14, 2018

Three weeks preceding D-Crunch's debut, a silhouette of the nonet against a red background was published. Beginning on July 23, profile images of each group member were released for three consecutive days in batches of three: Hyunwook, Hyunho, and Hyunwoo; Hyunoh, O.V, and Minhyuk; and Chanyoung, Dylan, Jungseung. An audio teaser of the lead single "Palace" was unveiled on July 26. Four days later, a teaser photo of D-Crunch was released. On August 1, a performance highlight video of "Palace", choreographed by the group, was shared. The single's music video teaser, directed by Lee Gi-baek, followed on the subsequent day.

0806 and the music video for "Palace" were simultaneously released on August 6. The group held a showcase for 0806 at the Shinsegae Mesa Hall in the Jung District of Seoul. D-Crunch began promoting "Palace" the following day by performing it on SBS MTV's music chart show The Show. The group made follow-up performances on Mnet's M Countdown, Seoul Broadcasting System's (SBS) Inkigayo, MBC Music's Show Champion, and KBS2's Music Bank. A choreography video of "I Want" was released on August 20. D-Crunch also promoted the single by busking in Hongdae in September. Promotions for the record were completed after six weeks.

== Critical reception and commercial performance ==
The Korean Broadcasting System banned the track "I Want" from syndication on its network after deeming it "unfit for broadcast". The company determined that the lyrics violated article 46 of broadcasting review regulations for mentioning a "specific" product brand.

On the chart dated August 5–11, 2018, 0806 debuted at number 46 on South Korea's national Circle Album Chart. The record charted for three weeks and shifted 1,105 units domestically by the end of the month.

== Track listing ==
Track listing
No.	Title	Lyrics	Music	Arrangement	Length
1.	"Palace"	Renziee, G.I.G	Renziee, G.I.G	Renziee	4:24
2.	"I Want"	G.I.G	Renziee, G.I.G	Renziee	3:55
3.	"Palace" (Inst.)		Renziee, G.I.G	Renziee	4:24
Total length:					12:43

== Credits ==
Credits adapted from the single album's liner notes.

- Bae So-woon – fan marketing
- Carry Diamond – rap director
- Chanyoung – choreographer
- Eun-tim – stylist
- Eun-jeong – make-up artist
- G.I.G – composer, lyricist, music director
- Ga-in – stylist
- Gyu-cheol – choreographer
- Hwang Yong-shik – photographer
- Hyeon-jeong – hair designer
- Hyeong-seop – choreographer
- Hyunoh – choreographer
- Jang Gi-hyeon – photographer
- Jang Se-hwan – manufacture
- Kim Han-sol – fan marketing
- Kim Yu-jeong – jacket design
- Lee Jong-seok – executive producer
- Na Sang-cheon – marketing director
- Nam Ho-cheol – A&R
- O.V – choreographer
- Park Sang-mu – photographer
- Park Shil-jang – stylist
- Renziee – arranger, composer, lyricist, music director, music producer
- Seo Hye-mi – media marketing
- Seung-rae – choreographer
- Shin Jeong-woo – artist management
- Shin Seong-shik – artist management
- Yoon Heung-kwan – management director

== Chart ==
Chart (2018)	Peak position
Circle Album Chart	46
