= D-Crunch =

South Korean vocal group

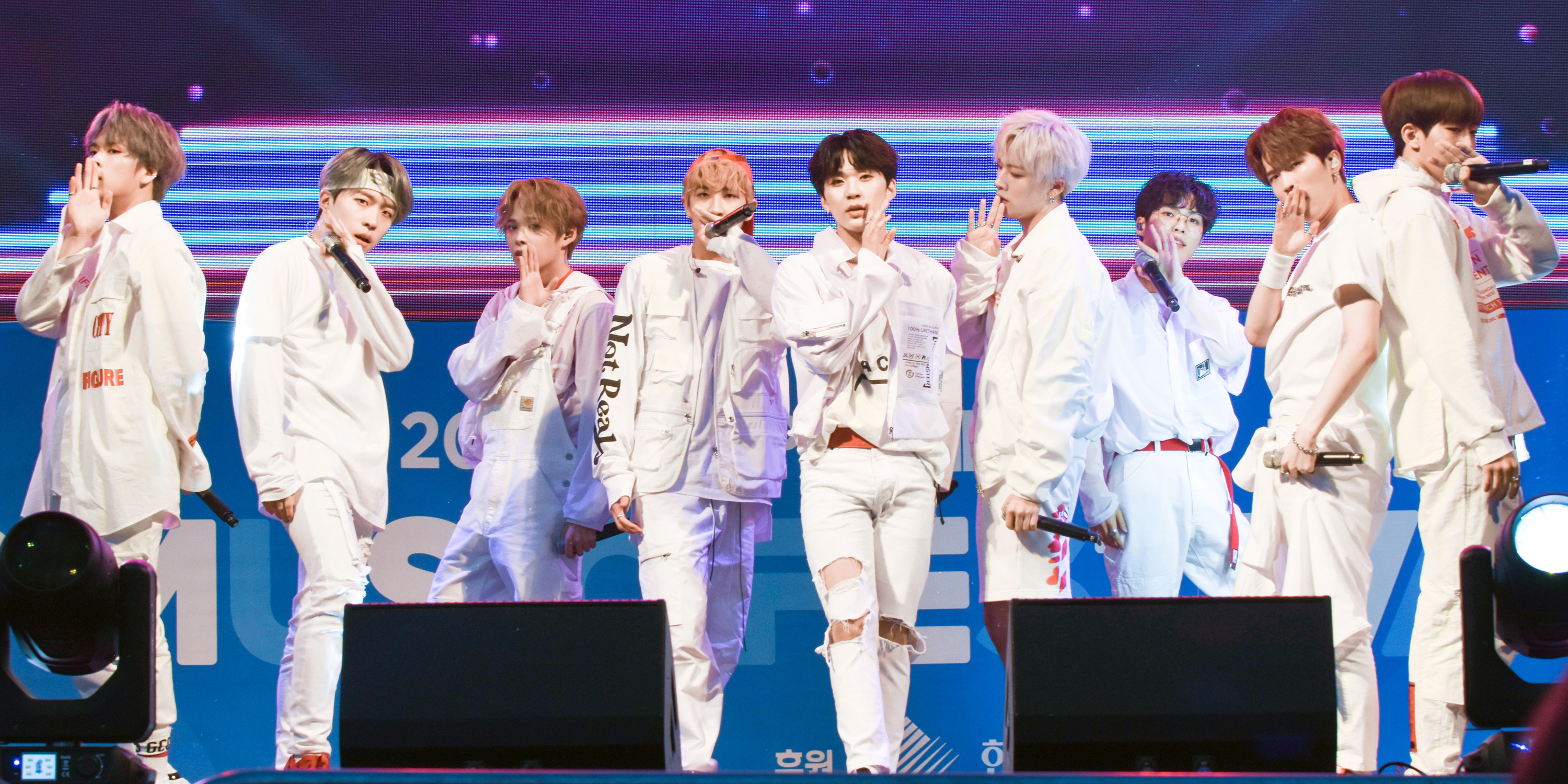
- D-Crunch performing at the K-pop Musical Festival at COEX, June 2019

Background information
- Origin: Seoul, South Korea
- Genres: K-pop, hip hop
- Years active: 2018–2022
- Labels: All-S Company, Ai Grand Korea
- Spinoffs: Geupsik-Dan
- Past members: Hyunwook; Hyunho; O.V; Hyunoh; Hyunwoo; Minhyuk; Chanyoung; Jungseung; Dylan
- Website: aigrandkorea.com

D-Crunch (Korean: 디크런치) was a South Korean idol group formed by All-S Company in Seoul. They debuted as a nine-member group with rappers Hyunho, O.V, Minhyuk, Chanyoung, Jungseung, and Dylan, and vocalists Hyunwook, Hyunoh, and Hyunwoo. The nonet released its debut single "Palace" from 0806 on August 6, 2018. Three months later, the group released its first mini-album M1112 (4colors) along with "Stealer". By the end of the year, D-Crunch received the Focus Award at the Asia Artist Awards. "Are You Ready?" from their second mini-album M0527 was released on May 27, 2019. In 2020, Hyunwoo halted promotions with the D-Crunch due to a back injury and ultimately left the group as a result. With the eight remaining members, D-Crunch released the mini-albums Across the Universe and Daydream henceforth. Minhyuk departed the group in November 2021, as did Dylan the following October. D-Crunch disbanded on November 9, 2022.

== History ==
=== 2018: Formation and debut ===
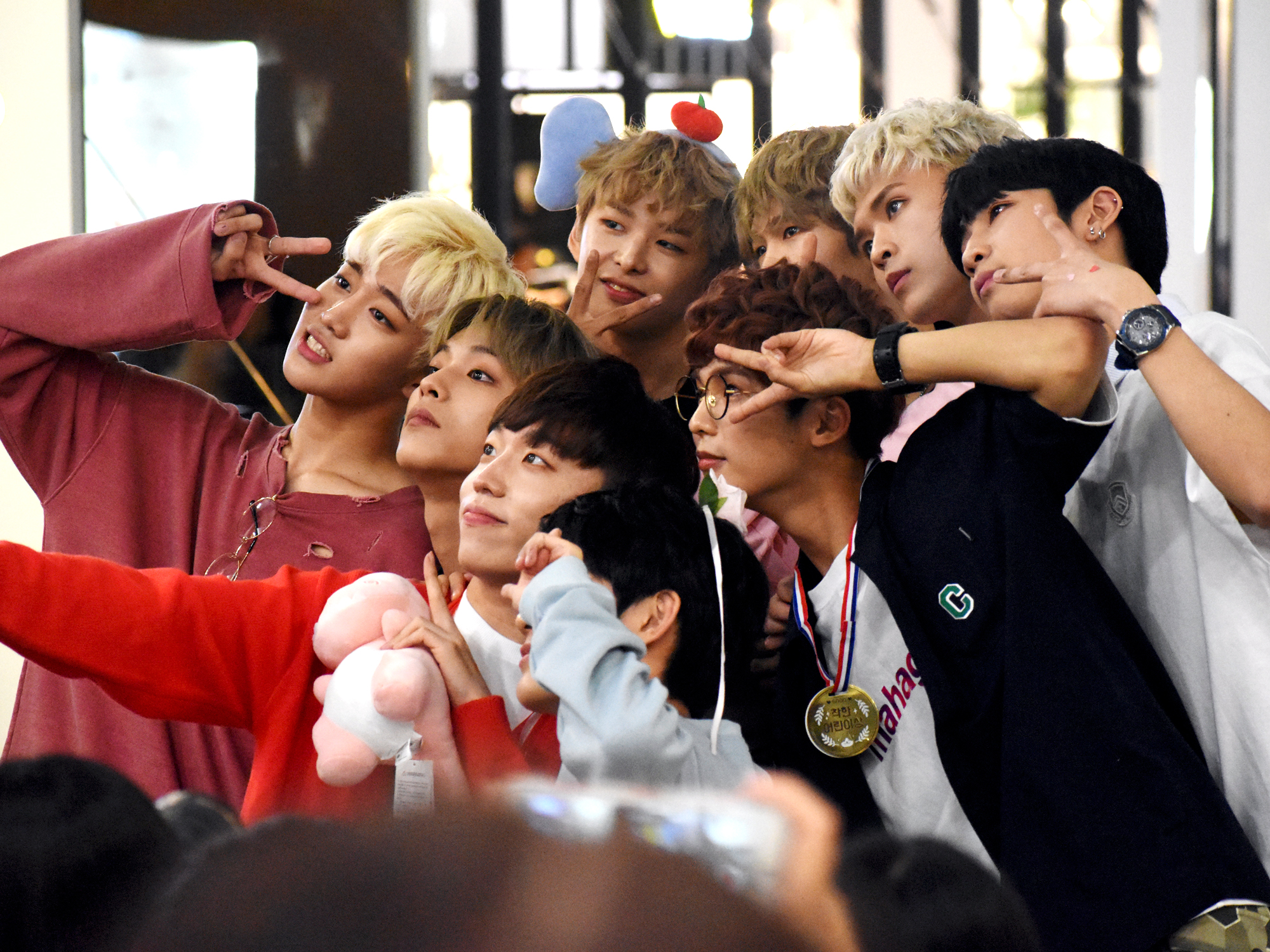
D-Crunch during an autograph event at Lotte Mall in Gimpo, August 2018

D-Crunch was formed under All-S company by Lee Jong-seok, producer of girl group Girl's Day. An abbreviation of Diamond-Crunch, it signifies their capability of breaking diamond with their "strong performance and powerful musicality". With a foundation in hip hop music, other considerations for their name included Hip Hop Force and Hip Hop Gangster. The group consists of six rappers (Hyunho, O.V, Minhyuk, Chanyoung, Jungseung, Dylan) and three vocalists (Hyunwook, Hyunoh, Hyunwoo). Hyunho and Jungseung were the first and final members added to the lineup, respectively. The members trained together for one year. The team is headed by leaders O.V and Hyunwook.

D-Crunch's forthcoming debut was first announced on July 4, 2018. Ahead of the group's launch, O.V, Chanyoung, Jungseung, and Dylan, in addition to All-S Company female trainees Hyungshin and Garam, debuted in the unit Geupsik-Dan with "Geupsik". D-Crunch released their debut single album 0806 and its lead single "Palace" on August 8. Their use of diamond imagery led to accusations of plagiarism of boy group Seventeen, which had employed the same element during its debut, utilizes Carat as its official fan club name, and likewise includes the phrase "boom boom" in its introductory greeting. D-Crunch denied the allegations. On November 12, the group followed up with its first mini-album M1112 (4colors) and "Stealer". D-Crunch won the Focus Award at the 2018 Asia Artist Awards, its first within four months after debuting.

=== 2019: M0527 and overseas promotion ===
D-Crunch was one among over one hundred applicants to audition for the 2019 K-pop Dream Star Audition in Japan. The group advanced into the final eight and performed at the Maihama Amphitheater on March 16. Voted by a panel of nine judges and the audience, D-Crunch accumulated the most points and was awarded the Grand Prix. As the prize winner, the band would receive up to ¥100,000,000 (US$911161.73) to cover promotion costs. D-Crunch traveled throughout Malaysia to embark on a promotional tour, which began with a press conference on March 22. They carried out six showcases and appeared on local radio and television broadcasts. In May, the group took part in the KCON 2019 Japan convention and helped promote tourism of South Korea by performing at the 2020 Daegu–North Gyeongsang Province Year of Tourism Road Campaign in Ho Chi Minh City.

D-Crunch released its second mini-album M0527 and the single "Are You Ready?" on May 27. The following month, they attended the 2019 Asia Model Awards, where they received the Rising Star Award. The band held a two-day showcase starting on July 27 at Ocean Center in the Pazundaung Township of Yangon, Myanmar. Preceding D-Crunch's entrance into the music market of Japan, they launched a two-week promotional campaign across Tokyo. The group held 16 promotional performances, including a showcase on September 20. They released a Japanese-language version of "Are You Ready?" on October 16 as their debut single in the country.

D-Crunch performed at the Korea Festival 2019 in United Arab Emirates on October 24, and traveled to Kuwait for the 40th Anniversary Concert of Korea-Kuwait Diplomatic Relations on October 27 hosted by the Ministry of Culture, Sports and Tourism. According to Chanyoung, the group modified its choreography to conform with Middle Eastern culture. Mohammed al-Jabri, the Minister of Mass Media and Information, canceled the latter performance shortly before it took place. D-Crunch apologized to the audience and the event was concluded. According to daily newspaper Al-Anba, the minister determined that D-Crunch's dances and attire "did not adhere to customs and traditions of the people of Kuwait".

=== 2020–2022: Across the Universe, Daydream, Addiction, and disbandment ===
In early 2020, D-Crunch terminated their exclusive contract with All-S Company and signed with Ai Grand Korea. The group established a funding project to produce a digital single with the service We X, which grants contributors rights to the song and shares to the revenue it produces. They released the song "Pierrot" with their new agency on May 22 via online music stores. A trap song, its lyrics describe living in "society's lies, oppression, and prejudice" and escaping to find one's "true self". In September, Hyunwoo ceased activities with D-Crunch to convalesce from an ongoing back injury, which worsened while preparing for their forthcoming album. D-Crunch continued as eight members and released their third mini-album Across the Universe and its title track on October 20. Hyunwoo ultimately left the group by the end of the year due to his injury.

D-Crunch released their fourth mini-album Daydream and its lead single "My Name" on April 6, 2021. Following Hyunwook and O.V's COVID-19 diagnosis amid the pandemic, the group halted promotions for the record. On November 9, Ai Grand Korea reported the departure of Minhyuk, who decided to leave the group after discussions with the agency. The company also announced the suspension of Dylan's activities due to the constant deterioration of his physical health and declining mental health from anxiety which began the previous month. On March 25, 2022, D-Crunch released their second single album Addiction. On October 21, 2022, D-Crunch announced the departure of member Dylan due to his continued anxiety disorder. Ai Grand Korea announced D-Crunch's disbandment on November 9.

== Musical style ==
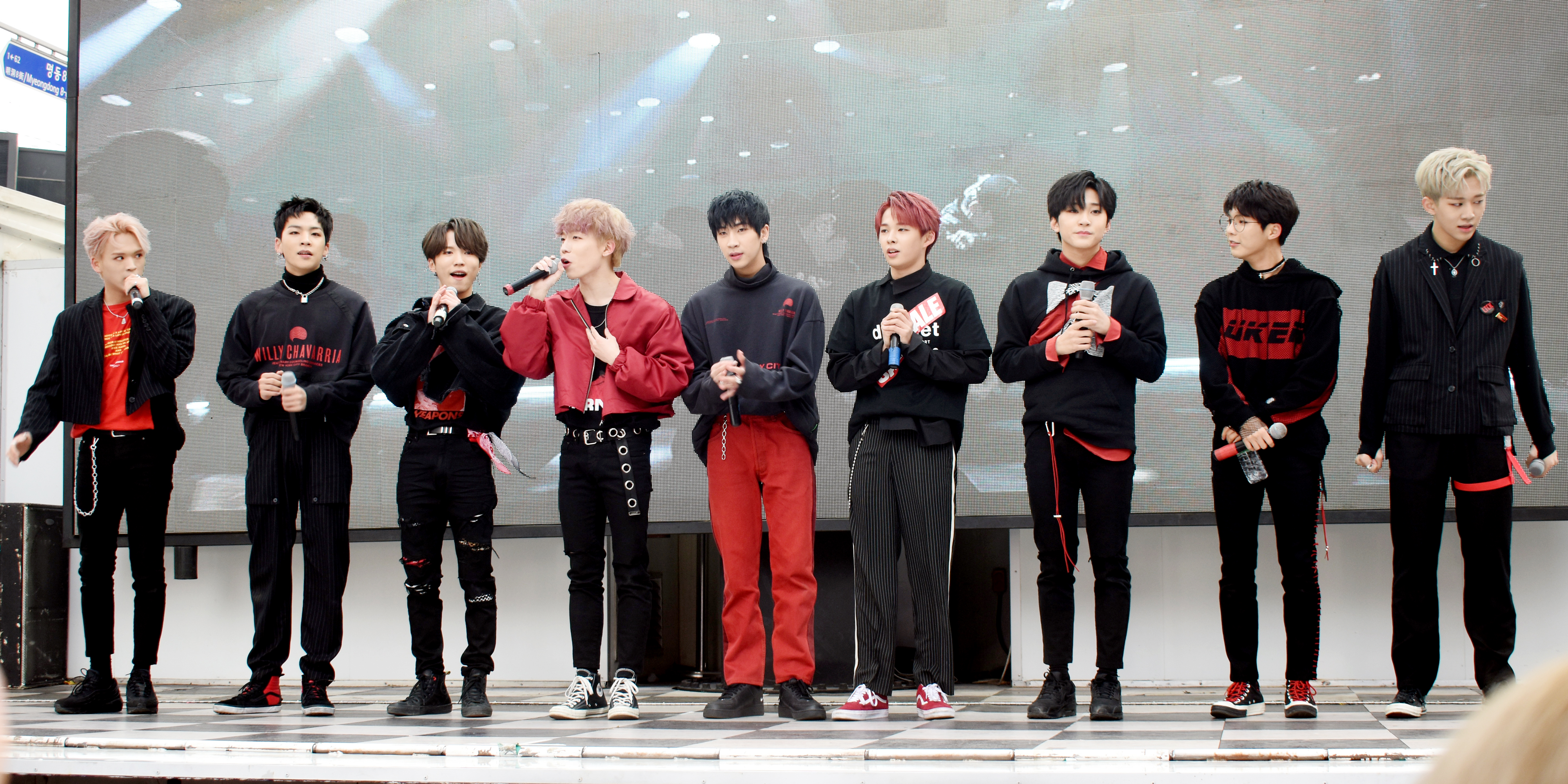
D-Crunch busking in Myeong-dong, November 2018

All members of D-Crunch participated in songwriting and choreography. They laid their music foundation in hip hop and try to "deliver a message" through their lyrics. G.I.G—an initialism for Good Thing Is Good Thing—is the songwriting team within the group which compromises Hyunwook, O.V, and Hyunoh. They shape D-Crunch's music direction. Each member supplied ideas to the songwriters, which are further developed to fit the group's style. Lee Jeong-yeon of The Dong-a Ilbo referred to them as the "singer-songwriter idol group". D-Crunch cited BTS as their role model.

== Philanthropy ==
D-Crunch held a domestic solo concert at the SAC Art Hall in the Samseong-dong neighborhood in Seoul on August 24, 2019, to mark their one-year anniversary since their debut. They partnered with Green Umbrella ChildFund and the entirety of the concert's proceeds were donated to the foundation. The group members explained that, in commemoration of their first year, they wanted to do "something meanginful with fans" and "help struggling children" with the revenue generated by the performance.

D-Crunch was among 18 vocalists from various genres that participated in a music video entitled "Crown for Korea". It was released on March 25, 2020, amidst the COVID-19 pandemic and was compared to the charity single "We Are the World". Speaking on the project, director Kwon Woo-ki expressed his intentions to "give courage to everyone living in this land that they would be crowned winners if they could keep their values and overcome this period". D-Crunch also partnered with the Gangnam District to produce content for a video series aimed to lift viewers out of "corona depression" by teaching them K-pop choreography. Entitled "K-pop Home Care", they provided dance instructions for Exo's "Tempo". D-Crunch also joined the Sports Doctors Relay Support Campaign and sent messages of encouragement to medical workers and citizens.

== Former members ==
List of members and roles.

- Hyunwook (현욱) – leader, main vocals
- Hyunho (현호) – rap
- O.V – leader, main rap
- Hyunoh (현오) – vocals
- Hyunwoo (현우) – vocals
- Minhyuk (민혁) – rap
- Chanyoung (찬영) – rap
- Jungseung (정승) – rap
- Dylan (딜란) – rap

== Discography ==
=== Albums ===
==== Extended plays ====
Title	Album details	Peak positions	Sales
Title	Album details	KOR	Sales
M1112 (4colors)	Released: November 12, 2018; Label: All-S Company, Kakao M; Formats: CD, digital download	39	KOR: 1,487
M0527	Released: May 27, 2019; Label: All-S Company; Formats: CD, digital download	46	—N/a
Across the Universe (비상; 飛上; Bisang)	Released: October 20, 2020; Label: Ai Grand Korea; Formats: CD, digital download	44	KOR: 1,871
Daydream	Released: April 6, 2021; Label: Ai Grand Korea; Formats: CD, digital download	74	—N/a

==== Single albums ====
Title	Album details	Peak positions	Sales
Title	Album details	KOR	Sales
0806	Released: August 6, 2018; Label: All-S Company, Kakao M; Formats: CD, digital download	46	KOR: 1,105
Addiction (중독; Jungdok)	Released: March 25, 2022; Label: Ai Grand Korea; Formats: CD, digital download	88	—N/a

=== Singles ===
Title	Year	Album
Korean
"Palace"	2018	0806
"Stealer"	2018	M1112 (4colors)
"Are You Ready?" (작당모의; Jakdangmoeui)	2019	M0527
"Pierrot" (삐에로; Ppiero)	2020	Non-album single
"Across the Universe" (비상; 飛上; Bisang)	2020	Across the Universe
"My Name"	2021	Daydream
"Addiction" (중독; Jungdok)	2022	Addiction
Japanese
"Are You Ready?" (Japanese ver.)	2019	Non-album single

=== Guest appearances ===
Title	Year	Release
"Promise U"	2020	Together Puppy Part.7

== Music videos ==
Title	Year	Director	Ref.
"Palace"	2018	Lee Gi-baek	
"Palace" (performance ver.)	2018	Lee Gi-baek	
"Stealer"	2018	Kim Jong-wan	
"Stealer" (flashlight ver.)	2018	Kim Jong-wan	
"Stealer" (container ver.)	2018	Kim Jong-wan	
"Stealer" (performance ver.)	2018	Kim Jong-wan	
"Are You Ready?"	2019		
"Are You Ready?" (performance ver.)	2019		
"Pierrot"	2020		
"Pierrot" (performance ver.)	2020		
"Across the Universe"	2020	Kim Jong-wan	
"Across the Universe" (performance ver.)	2020	Kim Jong-wan	
"My Name"	2021		
"My Name" (performance ver.)	2021		
"Addiction"	2022		
"Addiction" (performance ver.)	2022		

== Awards and nominations ==
Year	Nominee / work	Award	Result	Ref.
2018	D-Crunch	Asia Artist Awards – Focus Award	Won	
2019	D-Crunch	Asia Model Awards – Rising Star Award	Won	
2019	D-Crunch	Korea Culture Entertainment Awards – Rookie of the Year Award	Won	
