= Spectrum (group) =

K-pop group

- Origin: Seoul, South Korea
- Genres: K-pop; Dance-pop
- Years active: 2018–2020
- Label: WYNN
- Past members: Donggyu; Minjae; Jaehan; Hwarang; Villain; Eunjun; Dongyoon

Spectrum (스펙트럼) was a South Korean boy band formed by WYNN Entertainment. Their lineup at the time of their disbandment consisted of six members: Minjae, Jaehan, Hwarang, Villain, and Eunjun. Spectrum was originally a seven-piece group; member Dongyoon died on July 27, 2018, of undisclosed causes. They were planned to debut in October 2017, however, it was delayed due to their participation in Mix Nine. They officially debuted on May 10, 2018, with "Be Born". The group disbanded on July 10, 2020, due to the company's worsening situation caused by the COVID-19 pandemic in South Korea.

== Members ==
Former

- Dongyoon (동윤) - main rapper
- Minjae (민재) - leader, vocalist
- Donggyu (동규) - vocalist
- Jaehan (재한) - main vocalist
- Hwarang (화랑) - rapper
- Villain (빌런) - rapper
- Eunjun (은준) - vocalist

== Discography ==
=== Extended plays ===
Title	Album details	Peak chart positions	Sales
Title	Album details	KOR	Sales
Be Born	Released: May 9, 2018; Label: WYNN Entertainment, Genie Music; Formats: CD, digital download	41	N/A
Timeless Moment	Released: November 4, 2018; Label: WYNN Entertainment, Genie Music; Formats: CD, digital download	47	KOR: 1,023

=== Single albums ===
Title	Album details	Peak chart positions	Sales
Title	Album details	KOR	Sales
Refreshing Time	Released: April 29, 2019; Label: WYNN Entertainment, Genie Music; Formats: CD, digital download	42	KOR: 656
0325	Released: February 24, 2020; Label: WYNN Entertainment, Genie Music; Formats: CD, digital download	70	KOR: TBA

=== Digital singles ===
Title	Album details
Dear My	Released: September 6, 2018; Label: WYNN Entertainment, Genie Music; Formats: digital download

=== Singles ===
Title	Year	Album
"Light It Up"	2018	Be Born
"Dear My"	2018	Non-album singles
"What Do I Do"	2018	Timeless Moment
"After Party"	2019	Refreshing Time
"Showtime"	2020	0325
"—" denotes releases that did not chart or were not released in that region.
