= 14U =

South Korean boy band

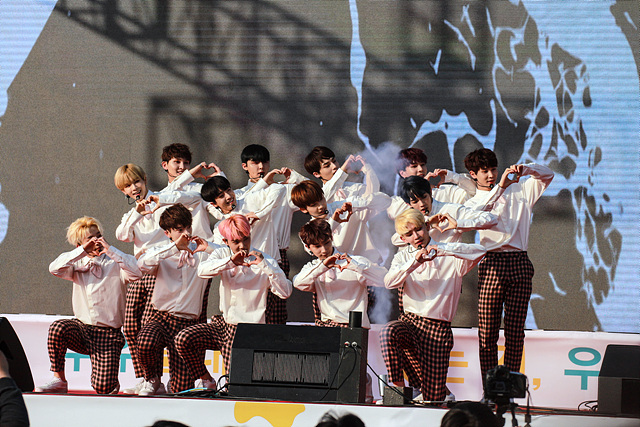

Background information
- Origin: Incheon, South Korea
- Genres: K-pop; Dance-pop
- Years active: 2017–2019
- Label: BG Entertainment
- Past members: E.Sol; Luha; Gohyeon; B.S.; Loudi; Eunjae; Woojoo; Dohyuk; Hyunwoong; Hero; Rio; Sejin; Gyeongtae; Gun; Doyool
- Website: www.baekgom-ent.com

14U (Korean: 원포유) was a South Korean boy band formed by BG Entertainment in Incheon, South Korea. The group debuted on July 22, 2017, with the single album VVV, and disbanded on May 10, 2019.

== Members ==
=== Past members ===
- E.Sol (이솔) – leader
- Luha (루하)
- Gohyeon (고현)
- B.S. (비에스)
- Loudi (로우디)
- Eunjae (은재)
- Woojoo (우주)
- Dohyuk (도혁)
- Hyunwoong (현웅)
- Hero (영웅)
- Rio (리오)
- Sejin (세진)
- Gyeongtae (경태)
- Gun (건)
- Doyool (도율)

== Discography ==
=== Single albums ===
Title	Singles details	Peak chart positions	Sales
Title	Singles details	KOR	Sales
VVV	Released: July 18, 2017; Label: BG Entertainment, Danal Entertainment; Formats: CD, digital download	—	
Don't Be Pretty (예뻐지지마)	Released: February 1, 2018; Label: BG Entertainment, Ogam Entertainment, Windmill Media; Formats: CD, digital download	41	KOR: 878
나침반 (N.E.W.S)	Released: October 26, 2018; Label: BG Entertainment, Ogam Entertainment, Windmill Media; Formats: CD, digital download	3	KOR: 26,884

=== Singles ===
Title	Year	Album
"VVV"	2017	VVV
"Don't Be Pretty"	2018	Don't Be Pretty
"N.E.W.S (Compass)"	2018	N.E.W.S (Compass)
