= Noir (band) =

South Korean boy band

- Origin: Seoul, South Korea
- Genres: K-pop; Dance-pop
- Years active: 2018–2023
- Labels: Luk Factory
- Members: Shin Seunghoon; Kim Yeonkuk; Lee Junyong; Kim Siheon; Ryu Hoyeon; Yang Siha; Kim Minhyuk; Kim Daewon
- Past members: Nam Yunsung
- Website: www.lukfactory.com/fp_artist_noir

Noir (Korean: 느와르) is a South Korean boy band formed by Luk Factory in Seoul. The group debuted on April 9, 2018, with the album Twenty's Noir. Their first official music video was for the track "Gangsta".

== Members ==
Adapted from the official website.

- Shin Seung-hoon (신승훈) – Leader, vocalist, rapper
- Kim Yeon-kuk (김연국) – Vocalist
- Lee Jun-yong (이준용) – Vocalist
- Kim Si-heon (김시헌) – Vocalist
- Ryu Ho-yeon (유호연) – Rapper, dancer
- Yang Si-ha (양시하) – Vocalist
- Kim Min-hyuk (김민혁) – Rapper, dancer
- Kim Dae-won (김대원) – Vocalist, dancer

== Former members ==
- Nam Yun-sung (남윤성) – Vocalist, rapper

== Discography ==
=== Extended plays ===
Title	Album details	Peak chart positions	Sales
Title	Album details	KOR	Sales
Twenty's Noir	Released: April 9, 2018; Label: Luk Factory, Genie Music; Formats: CD, digital download	36	KOR: 1,533
Topgun	Released: October 2, 2018; Label: Luk Factory, Genie Music; Formats: CD, digital download	30	KOR: 1,226
Abyss	Released: June 12, 2019; Label: Luk Factory, Genie Music; Formats: CD, digital download	38	KOR: 1,446
Up The Sky : 飛	Released: April 27, 2020; Label: Luk Factory, Genie Music; Formats: CD, digital download	24	KOR: 901

=== Singles ===
Title	Year	Peak chart positions		Album
Title	Year	KOR	JPN	Album
"Gangsta"	2018	—	—	Twenty's Noir
"Airplane Mode"	2018	—	—	Topgun
"Doom Doom"	2019	—	—	Abyss
"Lucifer"	2020	—	—	Up The Sky : 飛
"—" denotes releases that did not chart or were not released in that region.
