= 2019 in South Korean music =

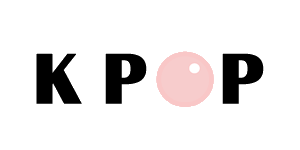
Korean pop music

The following is a list of notable events and releases that happened in 2019 in South Korean music.

== Debuting and disbanding in 2019 ==
=== Debuting groups ===
- 1Team
- 1the9
- 3YE
- AB6IX
- Ariaz
- Argon
- BDC
- Bvndit
- Cherry Bullet
- CIX
- D1CE
- ENOi
- Everglow
- Exo-SC
- Fanatics
- Hinapia
- Itzy
- Jus2
- Newkidd
- Oneus
- Onewe
- OnlyOneOf
- Purplebeck
- Rocket Punch
- Rolling Quartz
- SuperM
- Teen Teen
- TXT
- Vanner
- Verivery
- We in the Zone
- Wooseok x Kuanlin
- X1

=== Solo debuts ===
- Bae Jin-young
- Baekhyun
- Chen
- Ha Sung-woon
- Hwasa
- Hyuk
- Im Hyun-sik
- Jang Dae-hyeon
- Jang Dong-woo
- Jeon So-mi
- Jung Dae-hyun
- Kang Daniel
- Kang Min-kyung
- Kim Jin-woo
- Kim Ji-yeon
- Kim Jung-mo
- Kim Woo-sung
- Kwon Hyun-bin
- Lee Jin-hyuk
- Lee Jun-young
- Lee Min-hyuk
- Nichkhun
- Oh Ha-young
- Park Ji-hoon
- Roh Tae-hyun
- Ruann
- Sulli
- Sungmin
- U-Know
- U-Kwon
- Yoon Ji-sung
- Yoona
- Yukika
- Zelo

=== Disbandments ===
- 14U
- 15&
- A-Jax
- B.A.P
- Big Star
- Boyfriend
- CocoSori
- Drug Restaurant
- Good Day
- HALO
- Hello Venus
- Hi Suhyun
- Honeyst
- Kim Heechul & Kim Jungmo
- Myteen
- Nine Muses
- Pristin
- Pristin V
- Seenroot
- TraxX
- UNB
- Untouchable
- Wanna One
- Wassup

== Releases in 2019 ==
=== First quarter ===
==== January ====
Date	Album	Artist(s)	Genre(s)	Ref
1	Hello	Shaun	Electronic	
2	Drunk on Love	Ryeowook	Ballad, R&B	
2	XII	Chungha	Dance	
2	Circular	MC the Max	Ballad, Rock	
3	Day/Night	Rooftop Moonlight	Folk	
4	Going Up	M.O.N.T	Hip hop, Ballad	
7	Percent	Apink	Dance-pop, Ballad	
7	The New Kids	iKon	Hip hop, Dance-pop	
7	Lonely Night	KNK	Dance, Ballad	
8	WJ Stay?	Cosmic Girls	Dance, Ballad	
9	Light Us	Oneus	Hip hop, Dance	
9	Veri-Us	Verivery	Dance, Hip hop	
9	Statues	Junoflo	Hip hop	
10	Then & Now	g.o.d	Ballad, R&B	
10	White Night	Nemesis	Indie rock	
11	Monthly Project 2018 Yoon Jong-shin	Yoon Jong-shin	Ballad, R&B	
14	Time for Us	GFriend	Dance, Ballad	
15	Treasure EP.2: Zero to One	Ateez	Electronic, Dance	
15	Loca	Favorite	Dance	
15	Hutazone	Lee Min-hyuk	Dance	
16	All Light	Astro	Dance	
16	Dream of You	Punch	Ballad, R&B	
18	Another Day	Yoo Seung-jun	K-pop	
21	The Four Seasons	Hwang Chi-yeul	Ballad	
21	You Made My Dawn	Seventeen	Dance	
21	Let's Play Cherry Bullet	Cherry Bullet	Dance	
21	Memories of the Alhambra OST	Various artists	OST, Ballad	
24	Birthday	Roh Tae-hyun	Dance	
24	Only U	Imfact	Dance, Ballad	
25	Two	Junho	R&B, Ballad, Dance	
30	No.1	CLC	Dance	
30	Watch Out	Neon Punch	Electronic, Dance	

==== February ====
Date	Album	Artist(s)	Genre(s)	Ref
4	New Way	Kim Hyun-joong	Rock	
7	We Must Love	ONF	Dance, Hip hop	
7	Hello	Loco	Hip hop	
8	Reborn	Koyote	Dance, Hip hop	
11	Want	Taemin	R&B, Ballad, Dance	
11	IT'Z Different	ITZY	Pop, Dance	
12	Thirsty	The Black Skirts	Indie rock	
13	The End of Nightmare	Dreamcatcher	Rock, Dance	
14	V	Vanner	Hip hop	
18	Take.2 We Are Here	Monsta X	Hip hop, Dance	
18	Me	Nichkhun	R&B, Ballad	
19	X X	Loona	Dance	
19	Born	Trei	Pop, Dance, Hip hop, Trap, Rock, Funk	
20	Aside	Yoon Ji-sung	Ballad, Dance	
20	Allure	Hyomin	Dance, Ballad	
20	Narcissus	SF9	Dance, Hip hop	
26	I Made	(G)I-dle	Dance, R&B	
26	Fl1p	Sik-K	Hip hop	
27	Kang Min-kyung 1st Solo Album	Kang Min-kyung	Ballad	
27	Yearbook 2018	015B	Ballad, R&B	
28	My Moment	Ha Sung-woon	Dance, Ballad	

==== March ====
Date	Album	Artist(s)	Genre(s)	Ref
4	The Dream Chapter: Star	TXT	Dance, Ballad	
4	Bye	Jang Dong-woo	Dance, Hip hop	
4	I Wanna Be	Key	EDM, R&B	
4	The Crowned Clown OST	Various artists	OST, Ballad	
5	Focus	Jus2	R&B, Dance	
5	R.ook Book	Ravi	Hip hop	
6	Always Be Your Girl	S.I.S	Dance	
6	YOLO	HBY	Electronic, Trap	
8	Lots of Love	Hong Jin-young	Trot	
11	Sleepless in	Epik High	Alternative hip hop, Ballad	
11	9801	Wooseok x Kuanlin	Hip hop, Dance	
11	Master Key	Argon	Pop	
12	Dream:us	Dream Note	Dance	
13	The Park in the Night Part Two	GWSN	Dance, R&B	
13	Spring	Park Bom	R&B, Ballad	
13	Legend	Jannabi	Indie rock	
14	White Wind	Mamamoo	Dance, R&B	
14	Re:tro	100%	Hip hop, Dance	
15	Bangyongguk	Bang Yong-guk	Hip hop, R&B	
15	Blueline	twlv	R&B, hip hop	
17	Romance Is a Bonus Book OST	Various artists	OST, Ballad	
18	Arrival of Everglow	Everglow	Dance, Ballad	
18	Our Love is Great	Baek Ye-rin	R&B, Ballad	
18	My Lawyer, Mr. Jo 2: Crime and Punishment OST	Various artists	OST	
19	Plus Minus Zero	Jeong Se-woon	R&B, Ballad	
19	Thrilla Killa	VAV	Dance-pop, Hip hop	
19	She's Fine	Heize	R&B, Ballad	
19	Newtro	DIA	Dance	
20	Show Me	Momoland	Dance, Ballad	
22	Jumpin'	Suran	R&B	
24	Four Seasons	Taeyeon		
25	Clé 1: Miroh	Stray Kids	Hip hop, Dance	
26	O'Clock	Park Ji-hoon	R&B, Ballad	
26	Awake	JBJ95	Dance-pop, R&B	
27	Genie:us	Pentagon	Dance, Hip hop	
27	Hello!	1Team	Dance	
28	I'm a Mess	Bastarz	Neo soul, Dance	
28	Halo	PH-1	Hip hop	
28	Touch Your Heart OST	Various artists	OST, Ballad	
31	Holland	Holland	House	
31	The Lonely Bloom Stands Alone	Hynn	Ballad	

=== Second quarter ===
==== April ====
Date	Album	Artist(s)	Genre(s)	Ref
1	Heart*Iz	Iz*One	Dance, Ballad	
1	April, and a Flower	Chen	Ballad	
2	Puberty Book I Bom	Bolbbalgan4	Ballad, Indie pop	
5	Kill This Love	Blackpink	Dance, Hip hop	
5	Chapter2 "27"	Jung Dae-hyun	Ballad	
8	Far from the Madding City	Oohyo	Synth-pop, Indie rock	
10	This Time	Yongzoo	Ballad	
11	Us	Peakboy	R&B	
12	Map of the Soul: Persona	BTS	Dance, Hip hop	
12	Vague	Gree	Hip hop, New jack swing	
13	XIX	1the9	Hip hop, Dance, R&B	
13	Promise	KCM	Ballad	
14	Danger	Super Junior-D&E	Dance, Hip hop	
16	#Aeji #Passion	Hash Tag	Dance, Ballad	
18	Dear, My Universe	Jung Seung-hwan	Ballad	
19	Fancy	Youngjae	R&B	
22	Fancy You	Twice	Dance	
22	Act 1: The Orchestra	Son Dong-woon	Ballad	
22	M the M	Target	Dance-pop	
24	Veri-Able	Verivery	Dance, Ballad	
24	Spring Memories	N.Flying	Rock	
24	Dongkiz on the Block	Dongkiz	Dance	
25	Dear Diary	Yoon Ji-sung	Ballad	
25	Mind U	Mind U	Indie folk	
25	Newkidd	Newkidd	Dance-pop	
26	Hard to Say Goodbye	Bae Jin-young	R&B	
26	Skepticism	Yang Da-il	Ballad	
29	Bloom Bloom	The Boyz	Dance, Ballad	
29	Happily Ever After	NU'EST	Dance-pop	
29	Refreshing Time	Spectrum	Dance-pop, Hip hop	

==== May ====
Date	Album	Artist(s)	Genre(s)	Ref
1	D-Hours AM 7:03	Kim Dong-han	Dance-pop, Ballad	
2	Re: Blue Rose	Park Bom	Ballad, R&B	
4	The Moment I Loved	Jenyer	R&B	
7	A New Journey	Nam Woo-hyun	Ballad, Dance	
8	The Fifth Season	Oh My Girl	Dance, Ballad	
8	Yu Seung Woo 2	Yoo Seung-woo	Folk rock	
10	Some-	NC.A	Ballad, Dance-pop	
10	Dialogue on the Road	J Rabbit	Indie folk, Acoustic	
13	1/4	Onewe	Alternative rock; Ballad	
14	Lock End LOL	Weki Meki	Dance, Ballad	
15	We	Winner	Dance, Hip hop	
15	We	EXID	Dance, R&B	
17	Under Cover	A.C.E	Dance, Hip hop	
19	Plate	Cheeze	R&B, Ballad	
20	Spinning Top	Got7	Dance, Hip hop	
20	Once Upon a Time	Lovelyz	Dance, Ballad	
20	Another	Kim Jae-hwan	Ballad, Dance	
20	The Day We Meet Again	Kyuhyun	Ballad	
22	B Complete	AB6IX	Dance, Hip hop	
22	Love Adventure	Cherry Bullet	Dance-pop	
22	Log	Katie	R&B	
22	Mystique	Forestella	Classical crossover	
23	Re:IZ	IZ	Rock	
23	Gwichanist	Park Kyung	Dance	
23	Finger Heart	Roh Ji-hoon	Trot	
24	We Are Superhuman	NCT 127	Dance, Hip hop	
25	Fantastic	Berry Good	Dance	
27	M0527	D-Crunch	Hip hop	
27	We in the Zone	We in the Zone	Dance-pop, Hip hop	
28	Dot Point Jump	OnlyOneOf	Hip hop, Dance	
29	Raise Us	Oneus	Dance, R&B	
30	24°C	Lee Hi	Ballad, R&B	
30	A Walk to Remember	Yoona	Ballad, Acoustic	
30	Stand	Sunwoo Jung-a	R&B	
30	Her Private Life OST	Various artists	OST	

==== June ====
Date	Album	Artist(s)	Genre(s)	Ref
3	One Fine Day	Sandeul	Ballad	
4	For the Summer	Cosmic Girls	Dance, Bubblegum	
4	Fun Factory	Fromis 9	Dance	
4	Dear. N9ne	Teen Top	Dance, Ballad	
7	Moment	Heo Young-saeng	Ballad	
7	The Road Less Traveled	Jay Park	Hip hop	
10	Treasure EP.3: One to All	Ateez	Dance, Hip hop	
10	100 Years College Course	Giriboy	Hip hop	
12	True Colors	U-Know	Pop, Dance	
12	Abyss	Noir	Hip hop, R&B	
17	Muse	Leo	R&B, Ballad	
17	RPM	SF9	Dance	
18	Pink Magic	Yesung	Ballad, R&B	
19	Clé 2: Yellow Wood	Stray Kids	Hip hop, Dance	
19	The ReVe Festival: Day 1	Red Velvet	Pop	
21	Distance	Zelo	Hip hop, R&B	
24	Flourishing	Chungha	Dance, Ballad	
24	Crystal Ball	Purplebeck	Dance	
27	G1	Eun Ji-won	Hip hop	

=== Third quarter ===
==== July ====
Date	Album	Artist(s)	Genre(s)	Ref
1	Fever Season	GFriend	Dance	
1	A Song for You	Parc Jae-jung	Ballad	
2	Butterfly	Ailee	Ballad, R&B	
2	Stable Mindset	Younha	Ballad	
5	De-aeseohsta	Honey Popcorn	Dance	
7	We Don't Talk Together	Heize	R&B	
8	BXXX	Ha Sung-woon	Dance, Ballad	
10	City Lights	Baekhyun	R&B	
10	I'm So Pretty	Nature	Dance, Ballad	
10	Angel's Last Mission: Love OST	Various artists	OST, Ballad	
11	Just	1Team	Hip hop	
15	The Book of Us: Gravity	Day6	Pop rock	
15	KNK S/S Collection	KNK	Dance, Ballad	
17	Sum(me:r)	Pentagon	Hip hop	
17	The Wonder	Lena Park	R&B	
22	What a Life	Exo-SC	Hip hop	
22	Blockbuster	Dongkiz	Dance	
22	The Stranger	E Sens	Hip hop	
23	Hello Chapter 1: Hello, Stranger	CIX	Dance	
23	The Park in the Night Part Three	GWSN	Dance	
23	Give Me More	VAV	Dance, Latin pop	
25	Color on Me	Kang Daniel	Dance, R&B	
25	Wolf	Kim Woo-sung	R&B	
26	We Boom	NCT Dream	Dance, Hip hop	
26	Search: WWW OST	Various artists	OST, Ballad	
29	It'z Icy	Itzy	Dance	
31	Veri-Chill	Verivery	Dance	
31	Pinky Promise	Busters	Dance	

==== August ====
Date	Album	Artist(s)	Genre(s)	Ref
1	Wake Up: Roll the World	D1ce	Dance, Ballad	
1	Stay a Moment	W24	Rock	
5	Fall in Love	Oh My Girl	Dance, Ballad	
5	Rising	TRCNG	Dance, Hip hop	
6	Spark	JBJ95	Dance, R&B	
6	The Six	Fanatics	Dance, Ballad	
7	Pink Punch	Rocket Punch	Dance, Ballad	
13	Red	The Rose	Pop rock	
14	Heyday^{1}	Jinu	Dance	
19	Dimension	Viini	Hip hop	
19	Dreamlike	The Boyz	Dance	
19	Hush	Everglow	Dance	
19	s.s.t	Woo Hye-mi		
20	The ReVe Festival: Day 2	Red Velvet	Pop, R&B	
20	Yeah!sool	Kisum	Korean hip hop	
20	S the P	Target	Dance-pop	
21	Oh!	Oh Ha-young	Dance, Ballad	
21	From:IZ	IZ	Pop rock	
22	The Moment of Illusion	UP10TION	Dance, R&B	
24	Feel Good	Jang Dae-hyeon	Hip hop	
25	Awesome Up!	M.O.N.T	Dance	
25	Stunning	Sunwoo Jung-a	R&B	
27	Emergency: Quantum Leap	X1	Dance, Ballad	
29	Mono Diary	Jin Longguo	Contemporary R&B	
29	Nirvana II	Ravi	Hip hop	
29	2/4	Onewe	Alternative rock; Ballad	

==== September ====
Date	Album	Artist(s)	Genre(s)	Ref
4	Soar	Wheein	Ballad	
4	5cean: V	Vanner	Hip hop, Electronica	
6	Never Ending	Im Chang-jung	Ballad	
6	Love Alarm OST	Various artists	OST, Ballad, Rock, Indie folk	
6	Ride	We Girls	Dance, Ballad	
9	Zapping	F.T. Island	Pop rock	
9	At Eighteen OST	Various artists	OST, Ballad	
9	Room Service	GroovyRoom, Leellamarz	Hip hop	
10	Two Five	Bolbbalgan4	Ballad, Indie rock	
16	An Ode	Seventeen	Dance	
17	Sketch	Jung Dong-ha	Ballad	
18	Raid of Dream	Dreamcatcher	Rock, Ballad	
18	Very, On Top	Teen Teen	Dance	
19	Two of Us	Laboum	Dance, R&B	
19	Shape of Me	Kwon Jin-ah	Ballad	
19	IKYK	Saturday	Dance	
23	Feel Special	Twice	Dance	
24	Project A	Rhythm Power	Korean hip hop	
25	Sailing	AKMU	Folk-pop	
25	Rookie Historian Goo Hae-ryung OST	Various artists	OST, Ballad	
27	Not My Fault	Dress & Sogumm	R&B	
27	Someday	Soya	Ballad	
29	Be Melodramatic OST	Various artists	OST	
29	Love, Money & Dreams: The Album	Paloalto	Hip-hop, Rap	
30	Fly With Us	Oneus	Dance	
30	Thinking Part.1	Zico	Hip hop	
30	It's Soul Right	Brown Eyed Soul	R&B	

=== Fourth quarter ===
==== October ====
Date	Album	Artist(s)	Genre(s)	Ref
1	Dear My Dear	Chen	Ballad	
2	Day	Jeong Se-woon	Ballad	
2	Go Forward: Wide Dream	Argon	Dance	
3	Song Spring	Kim Jin-ho	Ballad	
4	SuperM	SuperM	Dance-pop, R&B	
4	Reminiscence	Baek Ji-young	Ballad	
7	6ixense	AB6IX	Dance, R&B	
7	Go Live	ONF	Dance	
7	Maum, Part. 1	Paul Kim	R&B	
8	Setlist	Shin Hye-sung	Ballad	
8	Treasure EP.Fin: All to Action	Ateez	Dance	
8	Over and Over	Kim Ji-yeon	Ballad	
9	We're Not Alone_Chapter1: It's You	GreatGuys	Dance	
10	Code#03 Set Me Free	Ladies' Code	Electropop, R&B	
10	Colors in Black	Nell	Indie rock	
10	Twilight State	YB	Rock	
11	Aight	Jung Dae-hyun	Dance	
13	Late Autumn	Heize	R&B	
14	Time Slip	Super Junior	Dance	
14	Rendez-vous	Im Hyun-sik	Alternative rock, Synth-pop	
15	Yaho	N.Flying	Pop rock	
15	Fall to Fly Pt.2	Lee Seung-hwan	Ballad, Pop rock	
17	Blah Blah	1the9	Dance	
17	Fly High	Fly to the Sky	Ballad, R&B	
21	The Table	NU'EST	Dance-pop, Ballad	
21	The Dream Chapter: Magic	TXT	Dance, R&B	
21	Poison	VAV	Dance-pop, Ballad	
21	Sobrightttttttt	Sogumm	R&B	
22	The Book of Us: Entropy	Day6	Pop rock	
22	O,on	Youngjae	Dance, Ballad	
23	C	Car, the Garden	Indie rock	
23	Cross	Winner	R&B, Hip hop	
24	Grand Opera	Ariaz	Dance	
25	Channel 8	MC Mong	Hip hop	
25	Nom Nom Nom	Sunny Hill	Dance-pop	
28	Follow: Find You	Monsta X	Hip hop	
28	Re_vive	Brown Eyed Girls	Dance-pop, Ballad	
28	Purpose	Taeyeon	Soul, R&B	
29	Under Cover: The Mad Squad	A.C.E	Hip hop	
29	Boys Da Capo	BDC	Dance	
29	Departure	Hoody	R&B	
30	Weeee!	We in the Zone	Dance	
30	Line Sun Goodness	OnlyOneOf	Dance-pop	
31	The Misfit	Samuel Seo	R&B	

==== November ====
Date	Album	Artist(s)	Genre(s)	Ref
4	Call My Name	Got7	Hip hop, R&B	
4	S.O.L	Lee Jin-hyuk	Hip hop	
4	Nostalgia	Victon	Dance-pop, Ballad	
4	Illusion	B.I.G	Dance-pop	
5	Be!	Bvndit	Dance, R&B	
6	One	1Team	Hip hop	
6	Festival	MeloMance	Indie folk, Ballad	
6	Alone	Kim Dong-jun	Ballad	
6	Dongky Town	Dongkiz	EDM, Ballad	
7	Harmonia	Forte di Quattro	Classical crossover	
8	Thinking Part.2	Zico	Hip hop, Ballad	
8	Limitless Part.1	Ravi	Korean hip hop	
9	4	Eluphant	Korean hip hop	
10	Dream Catcher	MFBTY	Korean hip hop, R&B	
10	To Love Only Once	Park Kyung	R&B	
11	PRVT 01	One	Hip hop	
12	Nature World: Code A	Nature	Dance, Ballad	
12	White Night	Seven O'Clock	Dance	
12	Bad Love	Hynn	Ballad	
14	Puzzle	In2It	Dance	
14	Reality in Black	Mamamoo	Dance, Ballad	
14	Over the Rainbow	Rainbow	K-pop	
15	New Day	Sweet Sorrow	Ballad	
15	Twice	South Club	Indie rock	
18	Love Poem	IU	Ballad, Pop rock	
18	Re-boot	Golden Child	Dance, Ballad	
19	As You Wish	Cosmic Girls	Dance, Ballad	
19	Hello Chapter 2: Hello, Strange Place	CIX	Dance, R&B	
20	Blue Flame	Astro	Dance, Ballad	
20	Goodbye My Twenties	DinDin	Korean hip hop	
21	When the Camellia Blooms OST	Various artists	OST	
22	Orgel	Sungmin	Ballad	
23	Limitless Part.2	Ravi	Korean hip hop	
26	New Moon	AOA	Dance	
26	Off Duty	Dynamic Duo	Hip hop	
26	The Tale of Nokdu OST	Various artists	OST, Ballad, Rock	
27	Obsession	Exo	Dance-pop, Hip hop	
28	Come	Newkidd	Dance-pop	
29	Memento	IZ	Pop rock	

==== December ====
Date	Album	Artist(s)	Genre(s)	Ref
2	Fatal Album III	Giriboy	Hip hop	
4	360	Park Ji-hoon	Dance, R&B	
5	From Midnight to Sunrise	Crush	R&B	
5	Gallery	Lee Jun-young	Dance, Hip hop	
9	Clé: Levanter	Stray Kids	Hip hop, Dance	
10	Every Letter I Sent You	Baek Ye-rin	R&B	
10	Chief of Staff 2: People who Make the World OST	Various artists	OST, Ballad	
11	Starry Night	BoA	R&B, Dance-pop	
11	Hate Everything	Golden	R&B	
12	Moment	Kim Jae-hwan	R&B	
12	Serenade	Sunwoo Jung-a	Alternative R&B, Electropop	
13	Yours, Sincerely	Kim Feel	Ballad	
18	Inner Space	Jang Jae-in	R&B, Ballad	
18	Winter Butterfly	Hyuk	Ballad	
19	For RAYS, Realize All Your Star	ENOi	Ballad, Dance	
23	The ReVe Festival: Finale	Red Velvet	Pop, R&B	
30	Thumbs Up	Momoland	Dance	

== Deaths ==
- Woo Hye-mi, aged 31. Singer
- Sulli, aged 25. Singer, actress and former member of f(x)
- Goo Hara, aged 28. Singer, actress and former member of Kara

== See also ==
- List of South Korean films of 2019
- List of Gaon Album Chart number ones of 2019
- List of Gaon Digital Chart number ones of 2019

== Notes ==
- ^{1}The following was released as a single but charted on the Gaon Album Chart.
