= List of Under Nineteen contestants =

Under Nineteen is a South Korean reality television show.

== Contestants ==
The spelling of names in English is according to the official website. The Korean contestants are presented in Eastern order (family name, given name). The age listed is according to the Korean age system at the start of the competition.

Color key

- Left the show
- Eliminated in Episode 6
- Eliminated in Episode 9
- Eliminated in Episode 12
- Eliminated in Episode 13
- Eliminated in Episode 14
- Final members of 1THE9

=== Vocal Team ===
Name		Age	Ranking																
Name		Age	Judge	Studio Audience & Online															
Name		Age	Ep.2	Ep.3	Ep.4	Episode 6		Ep.7	Episode 9		Ep.10	Jan 9	Episode 12		Episode 13		Jan 30	Episode 14	
English	Hangul	Age	#	#	#	#	Votes	#	#	Votes	#	#	#	Votes	#	Votes	#	#	Votes
Kang Jun-hyuck	강준혁	16	11	7	9	6	147,126	7	8	211,854	11	11	8	231,780	7	Unknown			
Kim Kun	김건	16	18	14	12	14	122,430	16	15	100,042	15	15	16	Unknown					
Kim Bin	김빈	18	6	8	10	17	Unknown												
Kim Young-seok	김영석	14	3	4	8	11	133,180	14	13	153,175	12	12	11	Unknown					
Kim Young-won	김영원	17	4	6	5	8	145,664	6	6	224,272	10	8	6	273,738	4	42,329	4		Unknown
Kim Jung-woo	김정우	18	7	3	7	12	127,188	13	11	166,602	9	10	10	228,632					
Kim Tae-woo	김태우	18	19	13	4	5	156,742	8	5	231,829	5	5	4	362,781	3	68,074	2	2	399,509
Bae Hyeon-jun	배현준	14	13	10	17	7	146,603	5	7	222,094	7	7	7	266,997	5	25,823	5		Unknown
Shin Ye-chan	신예찬	16	2	2	2	2	187,996	2	2	311,385	2	2	2	512,114	2	70,531	3	3	390,005
Yoon Do-yeon	윤도연	17	9	15	11	19	Unknown												
Yoon Tae-kyung	윤태경	16	16	9	15	4	171,191	1	1	326,120	4	4	5	309,426	8	Unknown			
Lee Dong-joon	이동준	18	17	19	18	15	122,108	11	14	143,469	8	9	13	Unknown					
Lee Jae-eok	이재억	17	12	12	6	9	135,778	15	16	89,480	16	16	15	Unknown					
Lim Youn-seo	임윤서	17	15	16	13	10	135,200	12	12	154,667	6	6	12	Unknown					
Lim Hyeong-bin	임형빈	16	8	17	14	16	121,060	9	10	175,054	13	13	14	Unknown					
Jeon Chan-bin	전찬빈	16	14	18	16	13	126,091	10	9	178,525	14	14	9	229,646	6	25,333			
Jung Jin-sung	정진성	15	5	1	1	1	203,940	3	4	263,028	1	1	1	550,906	1	99,448	1	1	500,929
Jay Chang	제이창	16	10	11	19	18	Unknown												
Ji Jin-seok	지진석	19	1	5	3	3	176,323	4	3	267,057	3	3	3	432,880					

=== Rap Team ===
Name		Age	Ranking																
Name		Age	Judge	Studio Audience & Online															
Name		Age	Ep.2	Ep.3	Ep.4	Episode 6		Ep.7	Episode 9		Ep.10	Jan 9	Episode 12		Episode 13		Jan 30	Episode 14	
English	Hangul	Age	#	#	#	#	Votes	#	#	Votes	#	#	#	Votes	#	Votes	#	#	Votes
Koo Han-seo	구한서	15	19	11	13	14	89,673	13	14	Unknown									
Kim Sung-ho	김성호	17	6	5	15	4	140,395	1	1	340,236	4	5	6	312,976	6	Unknown			
Kim Ye-joon	김예준	16	5	2	8	5	122,473	8	10	Unknown									
Kim Jun-jae	김준재	17	18	15	10	19	Unknown												
Nam Do-hyon	남도현	13	16	3	17	12	96,920	9	12	Unknown									
Park Sung-won	박성원	14	12	7	5	9	112,358	5	3	271,287	3	3	2	456,983	3	53,080	2	3	342,430
Park Jin-oh	박진오	16	3	10	6	10	99,762	12	9	168,710	8	8	8	228,516					
Bang Jun-hyuk	방준혁	13	9	1	1	2	172,678	3	5	265,657	5	4	1	Unknown					
Yoo Yong-ha	유용하	18	14	16	12	11	99,454	6	6	230,315	7	7	4	433,487	1	72,190	1	2	347,424
Lee Min-woo	이민우	16	10	18	14	16	Unknown												
Lee Sang-min	이상민	15	11	13	9	7	117,870	4	4	268,401	6	6	5	422,337	4	43,616	4		Unknown
Lee Ye-chan	이예찬	12	4	6	2	3	151,232	11	7	225,263	9	9	7	255,595	5	41,110	5		Unknown
Lee Jun-hwan	이준환	18	8	19	16	17	Unknown												
Jang Rui	장루이	17	7	14	18	13	93,947	14	13	Unknown									
Chang Min-su	장민수	16	15	9	11	18	Unknown												
Jeong Taek-hyeon	정택현	14	13	4	4	8	115,959	10	8	222,521	2	2	3	450,440	2	53,661	3	1	377,883
Jung Hyun-jun	정현준	17	2	8	7	6	121,630	7	11	Unknown									
Choi Soo-min	최수민	17	1	12	3	1	173,601	2	2	338,152	1	1							
Choi Yong-hun	최용훈	18	17	17	19	15	Unknown												

=== Performance Team ===
Name		Age	Ranking																
Name		Age	Judge	Studio Audience & Online															
Name		Age	Ep.2	Ep.3	Ep.4	Episode 6		Ep.7	Episode 9		Ep.10	Jan 9	Episode 12		Episode 13		Jan 30	Episode 14	
English	Hangul	Age	#	#	#	#	Votes	#	#	Votes	#	#	#	Votes	#	Votes	#	#	Votes
Kim Kang-min	김강민	16	12	6	6	9	135,529	17	18	Unknown									
Kim Shi-hyun	김시현	19	19	2	2	2	208,842	4	4	235,387	5	5	4	324,046	3	60,347	2	4	Unknown
Kim Jun-seo	김준서	16	16	5	5	5	168,313	8	7	183,674	7	7	6	288,860	5	46,066	5	3	321,288
Min	민	17	8	9	10	11	123,525	14	13	146,987	12	12	12	Unknown					
Park Si-young	박시영	14	17	10	9	10	133,118	7	6	184,432	9	8	8	275,153	8	31,990	9		Unknown
Son Jin-ha	손진하	16	3	15	16	15	93,008	10	15	139,785	14	15	14	Unknown					
Song Byeong-hee	송병희	16	6	7	7	8	141,905	13	8	181,335	4	4	5	313,020	7	34,790	6		Unknown
Song Jae-won	송재원	16	14	8	8	7	143,868	6	5	187,399	11	11	11	Unknown					
Suren	수런	13	2	4	4	4	177,299	12	12	159,084	10	10	9	250,358	6	42,721	4		Unknown
Shin Chan-bin	신찬빈	16	9	11	12	12	113,348	15	14	143,267	8	9	10	Unknown					
Eddie	에디	19	1	14	14	16	91,936	19	17	Unknown									
Oh Da-han	오다한	16	18	19	19	17	82,391	9	9	179,621	13	13	13	Unknown					
Wumuti	우무티	18	10	1	1	1	285,524	1	1	371,028	1	2	3	384,375	2	90,930	7		
Lee Seung-hwan	이승환	17	15	12	11	6	151,238	3	3	258,783	3	3	2	474,532	4	57,770	3	2	325,754
Lee Jong-won	이종원	13	5	16	15	13	106,310	5	10	172,810	6	6	7	282,527	9	27,496	8		Unknown
Jeon Do-yum	전도염	15	4	3	3	3	207,235	2	2	322,940	2	1	1	551,943	1	120,308	1	1	678,953
Jeong Won-beom	정원범	18	11	18	18	19	73,360	18	19	Unknown									
Kosuke	코스케	17	7	13	13	14	103,367	16	16	Unknown									
Christian	크리스티안	18	13	17	17	18	76,018	11	11	165,064	15	14	15	Unknown					

=== Overall ===
Color key

- Contestant finished in that week's top 9

Team	Name		Age	Studio Audience & Online Ranking												
Team	Name		Age	Episode 6		Episode 9		Ep.10	Jan 9	Episode 12		Episode 13		Jan 30	Episode 14	
Team	English	Hangul	Age	#	Votes	#	Votes	#	#	#	Votes	#	Votes	#	#	Votes
Vocal	Kang Jun-hyuck	강준혁	16	15	147,126	20	211,854	30	30	24	231,780	22	Unknown			
Vocal	Kim Kun	김건	16	30	122,430	39	100,042	36	37	38	Unknown					
Vocal	Kim Bin	김빈	18		Unknown											
Vocal	Kim Young-seok	김영석	14	24	133,180	34	153,175	31	31	28	Unknown					
Vocal	Kim Young-won	김영원	17	17	145,664	17	224,521	29	25	20	273,738	14	42,329	12		Unknown
Vocal	Kim Jung-woo	김정우	18	26	127,188	30	166,602	28	29	26	228,632					
Vocal	Kim Tae-woo	김태우	18	12	156,742	14	231,829	16	16	12	362,781	6	68,074	3	3	399,509
Vocal	Bae Hyeon-jun	배현준	14	16	146,603	19	222,094	24	24	21	266,997	19	25,823	16		Unknown
Vocal	Shin Ye-chan	신예찬	16	5	187,996	6	311,385	4	5	3	512,114	5	70,531	4	4	390,005
Vocal	Yoon Do-yeon	윤도연	17		Unknown											
Vocal	Yoon Tae-kyung	윤태경	16	10	171,191	4	326,120	14	14	16	309,426	23	Unknown			
Vocal	Lee Dong-joon	이동준	18	31	122,108	36	143,469	27	28	31	Unknown					
Vocal	Lee Jae-eok	이재억	17	21	135,778	40	89,480	39	40	37	Unknown					
Vocal	Lim Youn-seo	임윤서	17	23	135,200	33	154,667	20	21	30	Unknown					
Vocal	Lim Hyeong-bin	임형빈	16	33	121,060	27	175,054	32	32	35	Unknown					
Vocal	Jeon Chan-bin	전찬빈	16	27	126,091	26	178,525	33	33	25	229,646	20	25,333			
Vocal	Jung Jin-sung	정진성	15	4	203,940	11	263,028	1	1	2	550,906	2	99,448	2	2	500,929
Vocal	Jay Chang	제이창	16		Unknown											
Vocal	Ji Jin-seok	지진석	19	7	176,323	9	267,057	13	12	9	432,880					
Rap	Koo Han-seo	구한서	15	46	89,673		Unknown									
Rap	Kim Sung-ho	김성호	17	20	140,395	2	340,236	8	10	15	312,976	21	Unknown			
Rap	Kim Ye-joon	김예준	16	29	122,473		Unknown									
Rap	Kim Jun-jae	김준재	17		Unknown											
Rap	Nam Do-hyon	남도현	13	42	96,920		Unknown									
Rap	Park Sung-won	박성원	14	37	112,358	7	271,287	6	7	6	456,983	10	53,080	8	7	342,430
Rap	Park Jin-oh	박진오	16	40	99,762	29	168,710	19	19	27	228,516					
Rap	Bang Jun-hyuk	방준혁	13	9	172,678	10	265,657	10	9	5	Unknown					
Rap	Yoo Yong-ha	유용하	18	41	99,454	15	230,315	12	13	8	433,487	4	72,190	5	6	347,424
Rap	Lee Min-woo	이민우	16		Unknown											
Rap	Lee Sang-min	이상민	15	34	117,870	8	268,401	11	11	10	422,337	12	43,616	13		Unknown
Rap	Lee Ye-chan	이예찬	12	14	151,232	16	225,263	21	22	22	255,595	15	41,110	15		Unknown
Rap	Lee Jun-hwan	이준환	18		Unknown											
Rap	Jang Rui	장루이	17	43	93,947		Unknown									
Rap	Chang Min-su	장민수	16		Unknown											
Rap	Jeong Taek-hyeon	정택현	14	35	115,959	18	222,521	5	6	7	450,440	9	53,661	9	5	377,883
Rap	Jung Hyun-jun	정현준	17	32	121,630		Unknown									
Rap	Choi Soo-min	최수민	17	8	173,601	3	338,152	2	2							
Rap	Choi Yong-hun	최용훈	18		Unknown											
Performance	Kim Kang-min	김강민	16	22	135,529		Unknown									
Performance	Kim Shi-hyun	김시현	19	2	208,842	13	235,387	17	17	13	324,046	7	60,347	6	10	Unknown
Performance	Kim Jun-seo	김준서	16	11	168,313	23	183,674	22	20	17	288,860	11	46,066	11	9	321,288
Performance	Min	민	17	28	123,525	35	146,987	35	35	33	Unknown					
Performance	Park Si-young	박시영	14	25	133,118	22	184,432	25	23	19	275,153	17	31,990	19		Unknown
Performance	Son Jin-ha	손진하	16	44	93,008	38	139,785	38	39	36	Unknown					
Performance	Song Byeong-hee	송병희	16	19	141,905	24	181,335	15	15	14	313,020	16	34,790	14		Unknown
Performance	Song Jae-won	송재원	16	18	143,868	21	187,399	34	34	32	Unknown					
Performance	Suren	수런	13	6	177,299	32	159,084	26	27	23	250,358	13	42,721	10		Unknown
Performance	Shin Chan-bin	신찬빈	16	36	113,348	37	143,267	23	26	29	Unknown					
Performance	Eddie	에디	19	45	91,936		Unknown									
Performance	Oh Da-han	오다한	16	47	82,391	25	179,621	37	36	34	Unknown					
Performance	Wumuti	우무티	18	1	285,524	1	371,028	3	4	11	384,375	3	90,930	17		
Performance	Lee Seung-hwan	이승환	17	13	151,238	12	258,783	9	8	4	474,532	8	57,770	7	8	325,754
Performance	Lee Jong-won	이종원	13	38	106,310	28	172,810	18	18	18	282,527	18	27,496	18		Unknown
Performance	Jeon Do-yum	전도염	15	3	207,235	5	322,940	7	3	1	551,943	1	120,308	1	1	678,953
Performance	Jeong Won-beom	정원범	18	49	73,360		Unknown									
Performance	Kosuke	코스케	17	39	103,367		Unknown									
Performance	Christian	크리스티안	18	48	76,018	31	165,064	40	38	39	Unknown					

== Trivia ==
- Performance team member Kim Shi-hyun is a former Produce 101 Season 2 contestant & former member of South Korean music duo Longguo & Shihyun.
- Rap team member Chang Min-su & Performance team member Eddie are former contestant of Soompi's Rising Legend. Eddie is also a member of a dance cover group called The First Bite.
- Vocal Team's Kim Jung-woo & Performance team's Kosuke are members of a pre-debut boyband HNB from Happy Face Entertainment.
- Performance team's Wumuti is a member of SWIN-S.
- Performance team's Lee Seunghwan, Song Byunghee & Jeon Doyum and Vocal Team's Jung Jinsung and Lim Hyungbin are members of Starhill Boys.
- Rap Team's member Bang Junhyuk and Vocal Team's member Shin Yechan are trainees of Top Media Entertainment. Bang Junhyuk debuted in 2020 with the group MCND.
- Rap Team's member Lee Yechan and Vocal Team's member Kim Youngseok are trainees of KQ Entertainment.
- Rap Team's member Nam Do-hyun participated in Produce X 101 and ended up at 8th place, therefore becoming a member of the project boy group X1.X1 disbanded on January 6, 2020. Nam Do-Hyun then become a member of BAE173.
