= Dear Diary =

Dear Diary may refer to:

== Film and television ==
- Dear Diary (1993 film) or Caro diario, an Italian film directed by Nanni Moretti
- Dear Diary (1996 film), a failed U.S. TV pilot released as a short film in 1996
- "Dear Diary", an episode of the animated TV series Alvin and the Chipmunks
- "Dear Diary", an episode of the TV series Brandy & Mr. Whiskers
- "Dear Diary", an episode of the TV series ChuckleVision
- "Dear Diary", an episode of the TV series Get Smart
- "Dear Diary...", a 2020 episode of I Am Not Okay with This
- "Dear Diary" (Kate & Allie), a 1984 television episode
- "Dear Diary", an episode of the TV series LazyTown

== Music ==
=== Albums ===
- Dear Diary (Bonnie Pink album), 2010
- Dear Diary (Cha Cha album), 1999
- Dear Diary (FM Static album), 2009
- Dear Diary (Kid Courageous album), 2006
- Dear Diary (EP), by Yoon Ji-sung, 2019

=== Songs ===
- "Dear Diary" (The Moody Blues song)
- "Dear Diary" (Namie Amuro song)
- "Dear Diary" (Yeri song)
- "Dear Diary", by Britney Spears from Oops!... I Did It Again
- "Dear Diary", by Pink from Missundaztood
- "Dear Diary", by Róisín Murphy from Ruby Blue
- "Dear Diary", by Travis from The Invisible Band
- "Dear Diary", by Bring Me the Horizon from Post Human: Survival Horror
- "Dear Diary", by Kep1er from Kep1going On
- "Dear Diary", by Divinyls from "What a Life!"

== Literature ==
- Dear Diary, a novel by Jeanne Betancourt
- "Dear Diary", a 1954 science fiction short story by Richard Matheson

== See also ==
- Dear Diary, My Teen Angst Has a Body Count, an album by From First to Last
- Dear Darlin', a song by Olly Murs that is often misheard as Dear Diary
