= JBJ (band) =

South Korean boy group

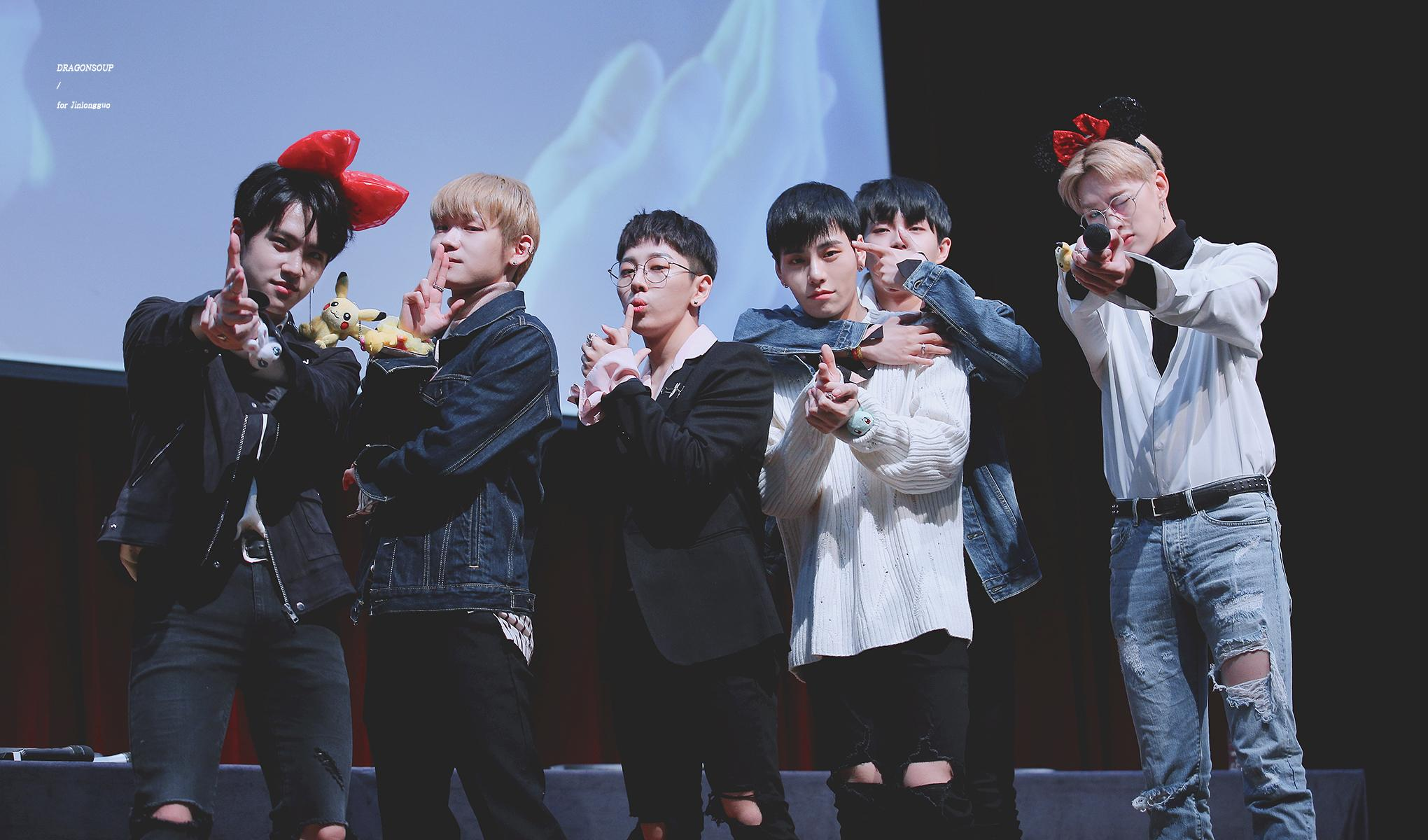
- JBJ in 2017; From left to right: Donghan, Kenta, Taehyun, Sanggyun, Longguo, Hyunbin

Background information
- Also known as: Just Be Joyful; Really Desirable Combination (Note: An accurate translation of "Joeongmal Baramjikan Johab" (Korean: 정말 바람직한 조합).)
- Origin: South Korea
- Genres: K-pop
- Years active: 2017–2018
- Labels: Fave; CJ E&M
- Past members: Roh Tae-hyun; Kenta Takada; Kim Sang-gyun; Jin Longguo; Kwon Hyun-bin; Kim Dong-han

JBJ (Korean: 제이비제이) was a South Korean boy band consisting of six members who previously participated in Mnet's 2017 survival show Produce 101 Season 2. The group was managed by Fave Entertainment, while CJ E&M oversaw the group's release production. They officially debuted on October 18, 2017. They held their final concert on April 22, 2018, and disbanded on April 30, 2018.

== History ==
=== Pre-debut ===
Produce 101 Season 2 premiered on Mnet in April 2017, where 101 male trainees from various South Korean entertainment companies competed to debut in an 11-member boy group that would promote exclusively for a year and a half under YMC Entertainment. The show ended on June 16, forming the project group Wanna One. On the same day, the show's fans had named Kenta Takada of Star Road Entertainment, Jin Longguo of Choon Entertainment, Kim Sang-gyun of Hunus Entertainment, and Kim Tae-dong of The Vibe Label (later known as Major Nine), as eliminated trainees whom they would like to debut together as a project group equivalent to Produce 101's I.B.I. (Note: Excerpt: "이런 가운데 남자판 아이비아이(I.B.I)는 벌써 나온 듯 하다. 국민 프로듀서 사이에서 '켄콜태균'이라는 조합이 큰 인기를 얻고 있다. 3차 순위 발표식 당시 아깝게 방출된 타카다 켄타(스타로드), 김용국(춘엔터), 김태동(더바이브), 김상균(후너스)을 일컫는 말이다. 이들의 데뷔까지 바라는 국민 프로듀서가 많다." Rough translation: Members of the possible male equivalent of I.B.I has also been chosen. The fans of the show refers to them as "Kenkoltaegyun", which consists of Kenta (Star Road), Jin Longguo (Choon), Kim Taedong (Vibe) and Kim Sanggyun (Hunus). The fans hope to see them debut as a group.) The fans tentatively named the group "JBJ", which stands for the Korean phrase 정말 바람직한 조합, meaning "A Really Desirable Combination", and "Just Be Joyful". (Note: Excerpt: "시즌2에도 이런 조합이 있다. 국민 프로듀서들은 타카다 켄타, 김용국, 김태동, 김상균에게 JBJ(Just Be Joyful의 약자)이라는 애칭까지 붙여줬다.") Later on, Roh Tae-hyun of Ardor & Able (later known as Star Crew Entertainment), Kim Dong-han of Oui Entertainment, and Kwon Hyun-bin of YGKPlus were soon added into the fan-imagined group after the Instagram photo that Taehyun posted had received positive feedback from fans.

Discussions to officially form and debut JBJ began around early July 2017 between the seven tentative members and their respective agencies. CJ E&M and LOEN Entertainment also participated in the discussions as the intended management companies of the group's releases and activities, respectively. Fave Entertainment, LOEN Entertainment's in-house label, was tasked to be the group's official agency. On July 25, the trainees and the companies had reached an agreement. It was reported that the group's contract would last seven months, but LOEN Entertainment expressed that they are open for any discussions to extend the group's contract. JBJ was tentatively scheduled for debut on September 10 with all seven members, but was later confirmed for debut on October 18 without Kim Tae-dong.

Kim Tae-dong's participation in the group was not confirmed because of an ongoing conflict with his agency, The Vibe Label. On July 27, Kim Tae-dong had sent his agency certification of contents and requested for his contract be terminated. Since then, the involved parties, including CJ E&M and LOEN Entertainment, had numerous meetings to resolve the conflict but, as of September 7, had yet to reach an agreement. After more than a year of inactivity, during which he was unable to promote as an official member of JBJ, he has returned to the agency, now called Major 9 Entertainment.

=== Debut with Fantasy ===
The group's first reality show, Just be Joyful JBJ, began airing on September 27, 2017, on Mnet M2 Channel.

JBJ released their debut extended play Fantasy on October 18, 2017, with the title song "Fantasy". They also held a debut showcase at Korea University's Hwajung Gymnasium on the same day. On October 19, JBJ made their official debut stage on the music program M Countdown with performing title song "Fantasy" along with song "Say My Name".

On October 19, it was announced that JBJ would hold fan meetings all across Asia, starting in Japan (Tokyo and Osaka) on November 23 and 26 respectively.

On December 21, it was confirmed that JBJ's new album was set to be released in January 2018 and also announced that JBJ would hold their first solo concert titled JBJ 1st Concert [Really Desirable Concert] from February 3 to 4, 2018. The two-day concert was held in Olympic Park's Olympic Hall. It was reported that the 7,000 available tickets sold out in under a minute.

=== True Colors ===
On January 3, 2018, JBJ announced the new extended play titled True Colors and also revealed the tracklist of the EP, followed by six individual teaser image of each members over the next six days. One day later, four teaser images of the group's was revealed. Two days later, the music video teaser for the lead single "My Flower" was released and the EP spoiler video was released three days later.

Following by the release of True Colors on January 17, JBJ held a comeback showcase titled Joyful Colors in Yes24 Live Hall the same day.

On January 18, Fave Entertainment announced that JBJ's fanmeetings across Asia had been concluded and finished in the Philippines on January 14.

JBJ received their first music program trophy with "My Flower" on the January 26 episode of Music Bank.

=== Possible contract extension ===
Originally, JBJ was set to disband in April 2018. However, all six members expressed interest in extending their contracts, there had been discussion over a possible extension of their contracts. On February 22, Fave Entertainment and all of the members' agencies had officially been discussing the possibility of a contract extension until December 2018. On March 14, Fave Entertainment confirmed that JBJ's seven-month promotions would be concluded with the expiration of the management contract on April 30, as the companies decided not to extend the contracts. The members would still actively promote until the end of their contracts.

=== Last activities ===
On March 15, 2018, JBJ confirmed that they would be releasing their last single "New Moon" on April 17, and also announced plans to hold a domestic concert and fanmeeting before the official disbandment date of April 30. On March 19, JBJ announced details on the final solo concert, titled JBJ Really Desirable Concert [Epilogue], which would take place in Seoul from April 21 to 22, 2018, as an extension of their first concert Really Desirable Concert in February. The two-day concert was held in at the Olympic Handball Gymnasium.

JBJ released their final album New Moon on April 17. The album included three new tracks in addition to all the songs from Fantasy and True Colors.

On April 22, JBJ concluded their final concert JBJ Really Desirable Concert [Epilogue] as their last performance.

The group officially disbanded on April 30, 2018, following their contract expiration with Fave Entertainment.

== Members ==
Adapted from their Naver profile.

- Roh Tae-hyun (노태현, former member of Hotshot)
- Kenta Takada (타카다 켄타/髙田健太, member of JBJ95)
- Kim Sang-gyun (김상균, former member of Topp Dogg, member of JBJ95)
- Jin Longguo (김용국/金龙国, member of Longguo & Shihyun, now a soloist)
- Kwon Hyun-bin (권현빈, known as VIINI, now a soloist, actor and model)
- Kim Dong-han (김동한, soloist, member of WEi)

== Discography ==
=== Compilations ===
Title	Album details	Peak chart positions		Sales
Title	Album details	KOR	JPN	Sales
New Moon	Released: April 17, 2018; Label: CJ E&M Music (Stone Music Entertainment), Fave Entertainment; Formats: CD, digital download, streaming; Track listing: 1. J.B.J. (Intro); 2. Fantasy; 3. Say My Name; 4. 오늘부터 (Ride With Me); 5. 꿈을 꾼 듯 (As If in a Dream); 6. 예뻐 (CD Only); 7. True Colors; 8. On My Mind; 9. 꽃이야 (My Flower); 10. Moonlight; 11. Wonderful Day; 12. 매일 (Everyday); 13. 매일 (Everyday) (Love Ver.) (CD Only); 14. 부를게 (Call Your Name); 15. ☆☆ (Be Joyful); 16. Just Be Stars	2	19	KOR: 59,959+; JPN: 6,680

=== Extended plays ===
Title	Album details	Peak chart positions			Sales
Title	Album details	KOR	JPN	US World	Sales
Fantasy	Released: October 18, 2017; Label: CJ E&M Music (Stone Music Entertainment), Fave Entertainment; Formats: CD, digital download, streaming; Track listing: 1. J.B.J. (Intro); 2. Fantasy; 3. Say My Name; 4. Ride With Me (오늘부터); 5. As If in a Dream (꿈을 꾼 듯); 6. 예뻐 (CD Only)	3	15	15	KOR: 137,859+; JPN: 8,893
True Colors	Released: January 17, 2018; Label: CJ E&M Music (Stone Music Entertainment), Fave Entertainment; Formats: CD, digital download, streaming; Track listing: 1. True Colors; 2. On My Mind; 3. My Flower (꽃이야); 4. Moonlight; 5. Wonderful Day; 6. Everyday (매일); 7. Everyday (매일) [Love ver.] (CD Only)	1	5	8	KOR: 123,034+; JPN: 22,715

=== Singles ===
Title	Year	Peak chart positions			Sales	Album
Title	Year	KOR	KOR Hot	US World	Sales	Album
"Fantasy"	2017	23	58	14	KOR: 80,075+	Fantasy
"My Flower" (꽃이야)	2018	20	9	—	—N/a	True Colors
"Call Your Name" (부를게)	2018	87	—	—	—N/a	New Moon
"—" denotes releases that did not chart or were not released in that region.

== Filmography ==
=== Television ===
- Produce 101 Season 2 (Mnet, 2017)
- Just Be Joyful (Mnet, 2017)

== Concerts ==
=== Headlining ===
==== Korea ====
- JBJ 1st Concert [Really Desirable Concert] (2018)
- JBJ Really Desirable Concert [Epilogue] (2018)

==== Japan ====
- 2018 JBJ Japan Tokyo Valentine Live

==== Asia ====
- JBJ 1st Concert [Joyful Days] (2018)
  - Thailand (March 31, 2018)
  - Indonesia (April 7, 2018)
  - Japan
    - Tokyo (April 10, 2018)
    - Osaka (April 11 & 12, 2018)

== Awards and nominations ==
=== Asia Artist Awards ===
Year	Nominee / work	Award	Result
2017	JBJ	Popularity Award	Nominated
2017	JBJ	Rising Star Award	Won

=== Gaon Chart Music Awards ===
Year	Nominee / work	Award	Result
2018	FANTASY	New Artist of the Year (Album)	Nominated

=== Golden Disc Awards ===
Year	Nominee / work	Award	Result
2018	JBJ	New Artist of the Year	Nominated
2018	JBJ	Global Popularity Award	Nominated

=== Korean Culture and Entertainment Awards ===
Year	Nominee / work	Award	Result
2017	JBJ	Kpop Singer Award	Won

=== Seoul Music Awards ===
Year	Nominee / work	Award	Result
2018	JBJ	New Artist Award	Nominated
2018	JBJ	Popularity Award	Nominated
2018	JBJ	Hallyu Special Award	Nominated

=== V Live Awards ===
Year	Nominee / work	Award	Result
2018	JBJ	Global Rookie Top 5	Won

=== Korean Entertainment Arts Awards ===
Year	Nominee / work	Award	Result
2018	JBJ	Best Rookie Group (Male)	Won
