= XIX (EP) =

EP by 1the9
- Released: April 13, 2019
- Recorded: February – March 2019
- Genre: K-pop
- Language: Korean
- Label: MBK Entertainment

Singles from XIX
- 1. "Spotlight" Released: April 13, 2019

XIX is the debut extended play by South Korean boy group 1the9, a project group created through the 2018 MBC survival show, Under Nineteen, composed of nine trainees from different entertainment companies that will promote for 12 months under MBK Entertainment. The album was released digitally on April 13, 2019, by MBK Entertainment.

== Background and release ==
On February 9, the finalists in survival show Under Nineteen were revealed and the group immediately started preparations for their debut, starting with arranging their own version of the song "Like a Magic" (which was first released as one of the final song for 9 of the Top 19 finalists), performing on Show! Music Core as a warm-up for their group sound. "Like a Magic" did not end up being officially released with the final line up and on the EP, "Domino", a song produced in seven days by Crush was released with a music video as a promotional single. Lead single "Spotlight" was later released in three different music video versions.

== Promotion ==
Prior to their debut, the group began promotions through their reality show Wonderland, which premiered on March 22, 2019, on the cable channel MBC. A series of individual teasers was released per member before the debut timeline was announced. The first set of concept photos were later released.

== Track listing ==
No.	Title	Lyrics	Music	Arrangement	Length
1.	"Domino" (featuring Crush) (produced by Crush, Gxxd)	Crush, Hangzoo	Crush, Gxxd	Crush, Gxxd, Kwon Se-young	3:29
2.	"Spotlight"	danke	Ryan S. Jhun, Scott Russell Stoddart, Kyler Nico	Ryan S. Jhun, Scott Russell Stoddart, Kyler Nico	3:11
3.	"The Story" (우리들의 이야기, urideul-ui iyagi)	TENTEN	TENTEN	TENTEN	4:07
4.	"R.N.R.H. (Right Now Right Here)"	TENTEN	TENTEN	TENTEN	3:25
5.	"Gravity"	TENTEN	TENTEN	TENTEN	3:25
6.	"Domino" (featuring Crush) (produced by Crush, Gxxd) (instrumental)		Crush, Gxxd	Crush, Gxxd, 권세영	3:29
7.	"Spotlight" (instrumental)		Ryan S. Jhun, Scott Russell Stoddart, Kyler Nico	Ryan S. Jhun, Scott Russell Stoddart, Kyler Nico	3:11

== Charts ==
Chart (2019)	Peak position
South Korean Albums (Gaon)	7
