= 1Team =

South Korean boy group

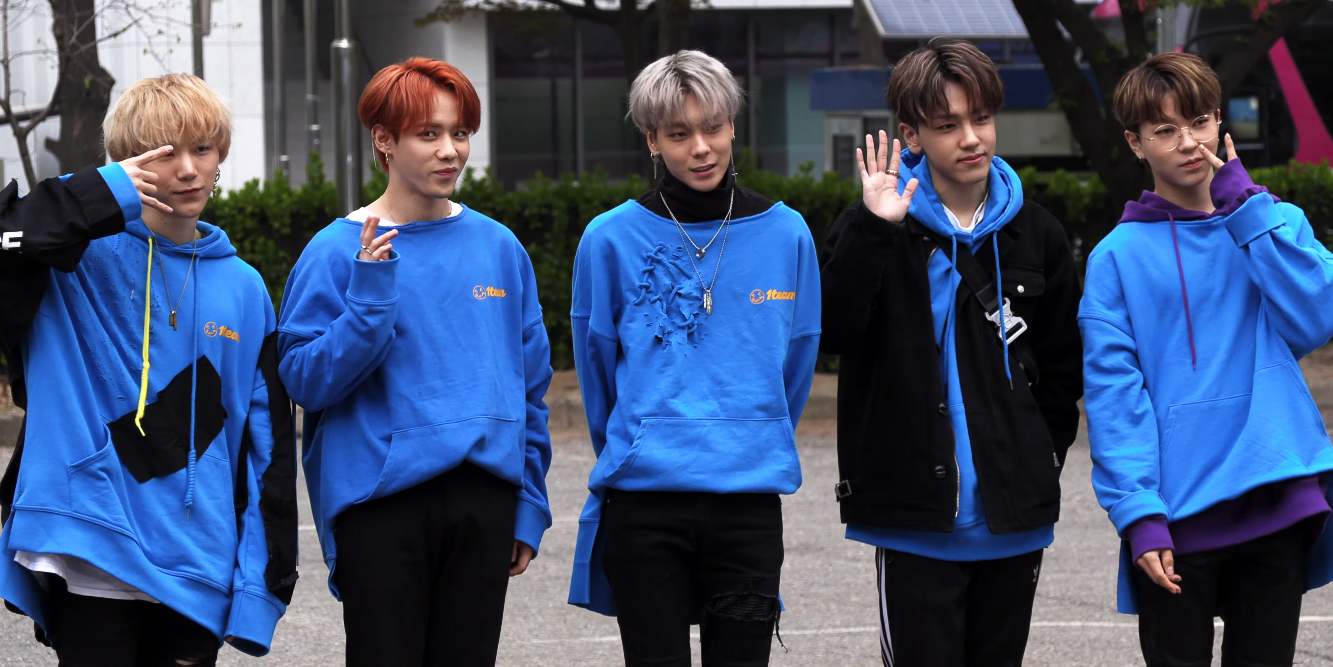
- 1Team in April 2019

Background information
- Origin: Seoul, South Korea
- Genres: K-pop; hip hop; R&B
- Years active: 2019–2020
- Labels: Live Works Company
- Past members: BC; Rubin; Jinwoo; Jehyun; Junghoon
- Website: www.lworks.co.kr/1TEAM/

1Team (Korean: 원팀, pronounced as: "One Team") was a South Korean boy band formed by Live Works Company in 2019. The name of the group means "Unique individuals become new as one". The group consisted of 5 members. They debuted on March 27, 2019 with the mini album Hello! and debut song "Vibe". Members Rubin and BC earlier appeared in shows Boys24 and Mix Nine.

On March 10, 2021, the group was confirmed to be disbanding after their final group activities on March 14, and that the members' contracts would be terminated.

== Career ==
=== Pre-debut Careers ===
The group was originally temporarily named team LWZ before debut.

== Members ==
- Rubin (루빈) – leader, vocalist
- BC (비씨) – rapper
- Jinwoo (진우) – vocalist
- Jehyun (제현) – vocalist
- Junghoon (정훈) – rapper

== Discography ==
=== Extended plays ===
Title	Album details	Peak chart positions	Sales
Title	Album details	KOR	Sales
Hello!	Released: March 27, 2019; Label: Live Works Company, Kakao M; Formats: CD, digital download, streaming	23	KOR: 4,343
Just	Released: July 11, 2019; Label: Live Works Company, Kakao M; Formats: CD, digital download, streaming	21	KOR: 4,953
One	Released: November 6, 2019; Label: Live Works Company, Kakao M; Formats: CD, digital download, streaming	17	KOR: 5,647

=== Singles ===
Title	Year	Peak chart positions	Album
Title	Year	KOR	Album
"Vibe (습관적 Vibe)"	2019	—	Hello!
"Rolling Rolling" (롤링롤링)	2019	—	Just
"Make This"	2019	—	One
"Ullaeli Kkollaeli" (얼레리꼴레리)	2020	—	Non-album single

== Filmography ==
YouTube
Date	Show	Note
2018	Interview With LWZ	5 Episodes
2019	Hello! 1Team TV	8 Episodes
2019	1Team Trip	6 Episodes
2019	1Team TV Season 2	9 Episodes
2020	1Team TV Tour Vlog	8 Episodes
2020	1Team TV 1gram	15 Episodes

== Concerts & Tours ==
- 2019: Debut Showcase: Hello! 1Team
- 2019: The 1st Fan-Con Just
- 2019: 1Team Fan-Con
- 2020: 1Team U.S Tour: Hello! Just One
