= Purplebeck =

South Korean girl group

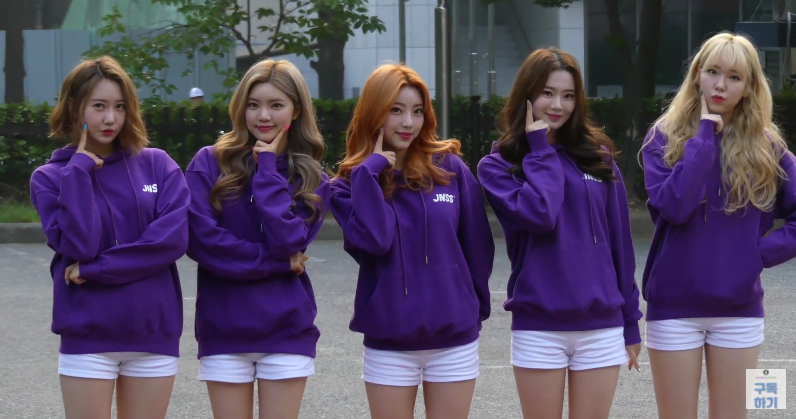
- Purplebeck From L-R: Seyeon, Yerim, Yeowool, Mini, Layeon (Former)

Background information
- Origin: South Korea
- Genres: K-pop
- Years active: 2019–2023
- Label: Majesty Entertainment
- Members: Yeowool; Yerim; Mini; Seyeon
- Past members: Layeon
- Website: http://majestyena.com/purplebeck/

Purplebeck (Korean: 퍼플백), sometimes written as Purple Beck, was a South Korean girl group formed by Majesty Entertainment. They made their debut on June 24, 2019, with the extended play, Crystal Ball. The group currently consists of four members: Yeowool, Yerim, Mini, and Seyeon. Layeon left the group in July 2021.

== Discography ==
=== Extended plays ===
| Title | Album details | Peak chart positions | Sales |
| Title | Album details | KOR | Sales |
|---|---|---|---|
| Starry Night | Released: March 21, 2020; Label: Majesty Entertainment; Format: CD, digital download; Track listing: 1. Starry Night; 2. VALENTi; 3. Tearful (그렁그렁); 4. Mare; 5. VALENTi (Instrumental); 6. Tearful (Instrumental); 7. Mare (Instrumental) | 25 | KOR: 1,200 |

=== Single albums ===
| Title | Album details | Peak chart positions | Sales |
| Title | Album details | KOR | Sales |
|---|---|---|---|
| Crystal Ball | Released: June 24, 2019; Label: Majesty Entertainment; Format: CD, digital download; Track listing: 1. Intro; 2. Crystal Ball; 3. Holiday (노는 날); 4. Outro; 5. Crystal Ball (Instrumental); 6. Holiday (Instrumental) | 54 | KOR: 500 |
| Dream Line | Released: September 30, 2019; Label: Majesty Entertainment; Format: CD, digital download; Track listing: 1. Dream Line; 2. Dream Line (Acoustic); 3. Dream Line (Instrumental) | 26 | KOR: 876 |

== Members ==
=== Current ===
- Yeowool (여울)
- Yerim (예림)
- Mini (민이)
- Seyeon (세연)

=== Former ===
- Layeon (라연)
