= Kei (singer) =

South Korean singer (born 1995)

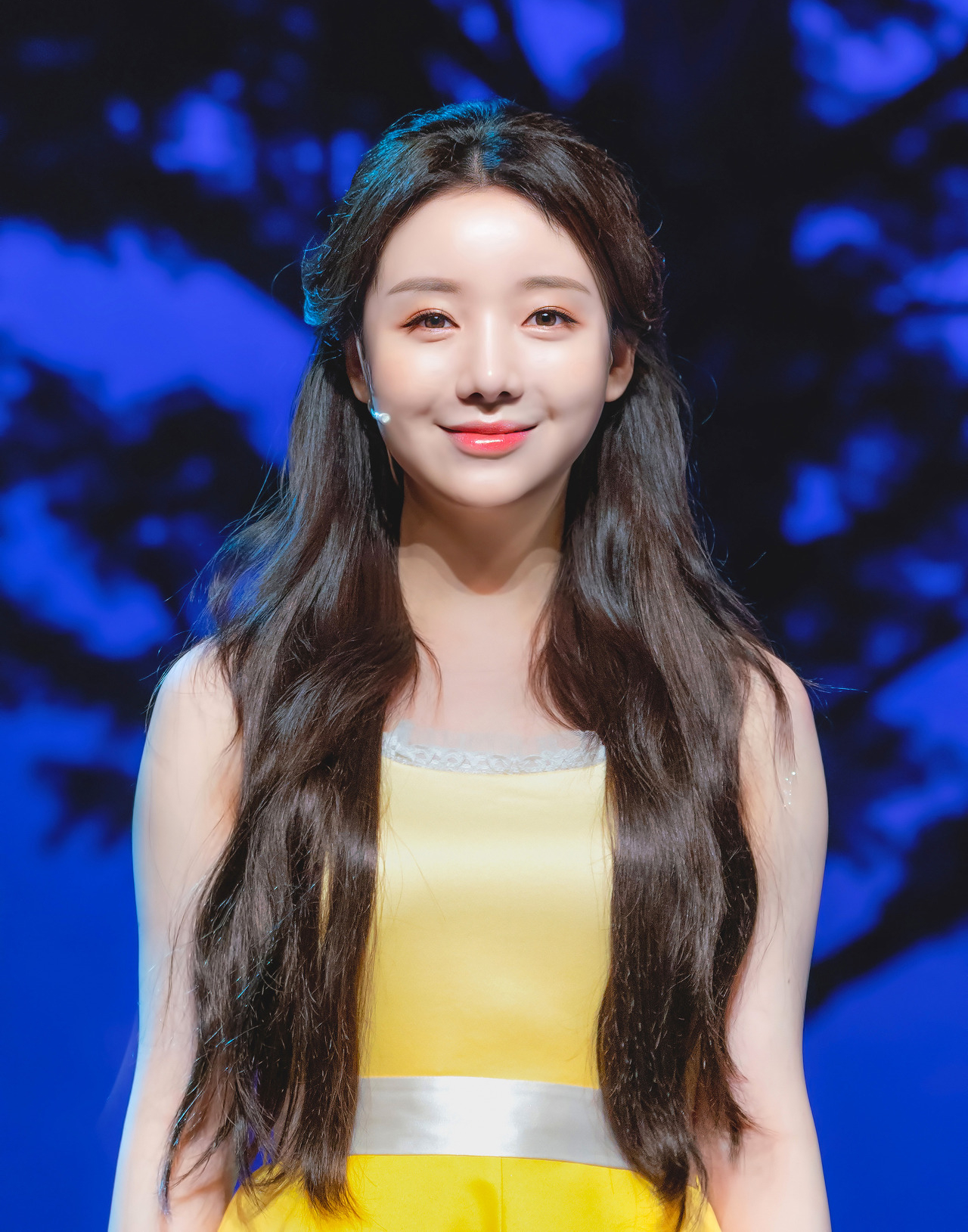
- Kei in 2021
- Born: Kim Ji-yeon; March 20, 1995 (age 31); Bupyeong District, Incheon, South Korea
- Education: Incheon Youngsun High School
- Occupations: Singer; musical actress
- Agent: A2Z
- Musical career
- Genre: K-pop
- Years active: 2014–present
- Labels: Woollim; Apple Monster (Note: As a member of El7z Up only.); DG
- Member of: Lovelyz; El7z Up

Korean name
- Hangul: 김지연
- Hanja: 金志姸
- RR: Gim Jiyeon
- MR: Kim Chiyŏn

Kim Ji-yeon (Korean: 김지연; born March 20, 1995), known professionally as Kei (케이), is a South Korean singer and musical actress. She rose to fame as a member of South Korean girl group Lovelyz in November 2014. Kei officially made her solo debut with the EP, Over and Over on October 8, 2019. On November 16, 2021, she left Woollim Entertainment, although she remains as a member of Lovelyz. She joined Palm Tree Island in January 2022 to focus on her musical career, before moving to A2Z Entertainment later that year. In 2023, Kei participated in Mnet reality competition show Queendom Puzzle, debuting with the resulting project supergroup El7z Up in September of that year.

== Biography ==
Kei was born Kim Ji-yeon on March 20, 1995, in Incheon, South Korea. She graduated from Incheon Youngsun High School.

== Career ==
=== 2014–2015: Debut with Lovelyz ===
In November 2014, Kei debuted as the main vocalist of girl group Lovelyz with the release of the debut studio album, Girls' Invasion. In December 2015, she recorded the song Love Is Like That for the drama Oh My Venus.

=== 2016–2018: Solo activities ===
She was a contestant for JTBC's main vocal competition Girls Spirit in 2016, and was cast for a lead role in the web drama Matching! Boys Archery Club in the same year. On September 1, she released the collaborative song "Y". On October 26, she released a collaboration with The Solutions titled Beautiful as a part of HIGHGRND label project PLAYGRND.

In 2017, she made appearances on a variety of shows. She appeared on King of Mask Singer as the contestant "Agiley Mouse Jerry" for episodes 107–108. She also went on Duet Song Festival covering Kim Tae-yeon's song "I". Other shows she guested on was Running Man and Idol National Singing Competition.

On June 8, 2018, it was announced that Kei would be the new MC for Music Bank alongside actor Choi Won-myeong, starting from June 15.

=== 2019–present: Solo debut, departure from Woollim, musical project and EL7ZUP ===
In 2019, she released the extended play (EP) Over and Over, under her real name Kim Ji-yeon. The album and the lead single "I Go" music video were released on October 8.

On November 1, 2021, Woollim Entertainment announced that Kei would not renew her contract and she left the company on November 16, 2021.

On January 10, 2022, it was confirmed that Kei signed with Palm Tree Island, signaling her debut as a full time musical actress.

In May 2022, Kei released a ballad, R&B project's 11th single 'Star Road' featuring KozyPop, which will be released on May 29, 2022.

In July 2022 it was announced that Kei would hold a fan meeting Kei from Kei on August 20, 2022, it marks her first solo fan meeting since debut and as well as her first in-person fan meeting after debuting as a full time musical actress.

In December 2022, Kei signed with A2Z Entertainment (Pop Music), with the intention of releasing a solo music album.

On May 26, 2023, Kei was confirmed to have joined the Mnet competition show Queendom Puzzle. She consistently ranked in the Top 7 as the show progressed and ultimately finished in 4th place, allowing her to debut with the winning group El7z Up.

On December 19, 2024, Kei released "Winter Garden".

== Discography ==
=== Extended plays ===
Title	Details	Peak chart positions	Sales
Title	Details	KOR	Sales
Over and Over	Released: October 8, 2019; Label: Woollim Entertainment, Kakao M; Formats: CD, digital download, streaming	7	KOR: 14,480

=== Singles ===
==== As lead artist ====
Title	Year	Peak chart positions	Album
Title	Year	KOR	Album
"I Go"	2019	— (Note: "I Go" did not enter Gaon Digital Chart, but debuted and peaked at number 113 on Gaon Download Chart.)	Over and Over
"Winter Garden"	2024	—	Non-album single
"—" denotes releases that did not chart or were not released in that region.

==== Collaborations ====
Title	Year	Peak chart positions	Sales (DL)	Album
Title	Year	KOR	Sales (DL)	Album
"Y" (with Myundo featuring Bumzu)	2016	49	KOR: 97,428	Non album-singles
"Beautiful" (with The Solutions)	2016	—	—N/a	Non album-singles
"Wanna Date" (연애하고 싶어) (with Hong Dae-kwang)	2017	—	—N/a	Story About: Some, One Month Eps 5
"—" denotes releases that did not chart or were not released in that region.

=== Soundtrack appearances ===
Title	Year	Peak chart positions	Sales (DL)	Album
Title	Year	KOR	Sales (DL)	Album
"Love Moves On" (사랑은 그렇게)	2015	—	—N/a	Oh My Venus OST Part 6
"Tingle" (찌릿찌릿)	2016	—	—N/a	Lucky Romance OST Part 1
"Star and Sun" (별과 해)	2017	—	KOR: 18,134	The Emperor: Owner of the Mask OST Part 4
"These Days You & I" (요즘 너 요즘 나)	2018	—	—N/a	Queen of Mystery 2 OST Part 2
"Let's Pray"	2018	—	—N/a	Rich Man OST Part 3
"If I Convey My Heart" (마음을 전하면)	2018	—	—N/a	The Last Empress OST Part 3
"My Absolute Boyfriend" (초능력 나의 그대)	2019	—	—N/a	My Absolute Boyfriend OST Part 4
"Ride Or Die" (with Joohoney (Monsta X))	2020	—	—N/a	Run On OST Part 2
"Good-Bye Days" (with Wonpil (Day6))	2021	—	—N/a	Midnight Sun OST Part 2
"Good-Bye Days" (with Baekho (NU'EST))	2021	—	—N/a	Midnight Sun OST Part 3
"Good-Bye Days" (with Onew (Shinee))	2021	— (Note: "Good-Bye Days" did not enter Gaon Digital Chart, but debuted and peaked at number 117 on Gaon Download Chart.)	—N/a	Midnight Sun OST Part 4
"Will My Day Ever Come" (그런 날이 오게 될까?)	2021	— (Note: "Good-Bye Days" did not enter Gaon Digital Chart, but debuted and peaked at number 122 on Gaon Download Chart.)	—N/a	Midnight Sun OST Part 5
"Good-Bye Days" (with Youngjae (Got7))	2021	—	—N/a	Midnight Sun OST Part 5
"A Fairy Tale" (동화 속 이야기)	2021	—	—N/a	Starting Point of Dating OST Part 2
"As I Become Your Wind – Noi Theme" (나 그대의 바람 되어)	2021	—	—N/a	Blade & Soul 2 - I Become Your Wind OST
"As I Become Your Wind – Noi Theme (Acoustic Ver.)" (나 그대의 바람 되어 - 노이 테마 (Acoustic Ver.))	2021	—	—N/a	Blade & Soul 2 - Pieces of Memory OST
"Just Stay" (이렇게 그대로)	2021	—	—N/a	History of The Bible OST
"Love Song" (연가 (戀歌))	2023	— (Note: "Love Song" did not enter the Circle Digital Chart, but peaked at number 49 on the Download Chart.)	—N/a	Tale of the Nine Tailed 1938 OST Part 2
"Wind Song" (바람의 노래)	2023	—	—N/a	Tale of the Nine Tailed 1938 OST Part 4
"Summer Love Blues" (썸머러브블루스)	2023	— (Note: "Summer Love Blues" did not enter the Circle Digital Chart, but peaked at number 79 on the Download Chart.)	—N/a	Summer, Lovemachine, Blues OST
"Bye" (안녕)	2023	—	—N/a	A Time Called You OST Part 2
"Falling" (스며드는 중)	2024	—	—N/a	Dreaming of Freaking Fairytale OST Part 1
"—" denotes releases that did not chart or were not released in that region.

== Filmography ==
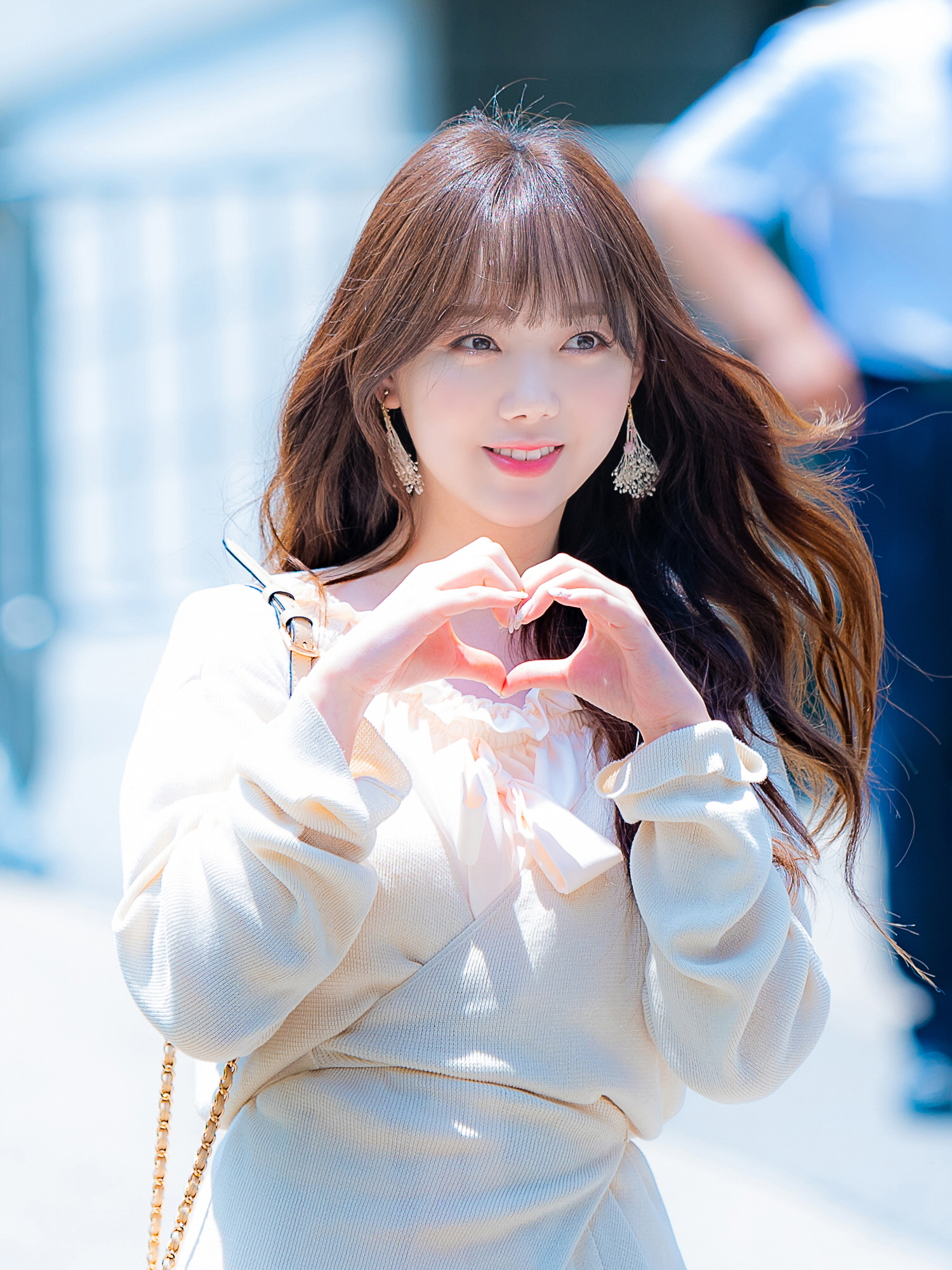
Kei going to work for her MC position at Music Bank, August 15, 2018.

=== Web series ===
Year	Title	Role	Notes	Ref.
2016	Matching! Boys Archery Club	Hong Shi-ah		
2021	ONAIR - Secret Contract	Cameo	Sitcom	

=== Web shows ===
Year	Title	Role	Notes	Ref.
2022	Idol Lyricist Idol	Main Cast	with Exy	

=== Television shows ===
Year	Title	Role	Ref.
2023	Queendom Puzzle	Contestant	

== Theatre ==
Year	Title	Role	Ref.
2017	At The Age of Thirty	Okhee	
2021	Midnight Sun	Seo Haena	
2022	Xcalibur	Guinevere	
2022	Death Note	Amane Misa	
2022	ONAIR	DJ	

== Awards and nominations ==
Name of the award ceremony, year presented, category, nominee of the award, and the result of the nomination
Award ceremony	Year	Category	Nominee / Work	Result	Ref.
KBS Entertainment Awards	2018	Best New Actress in Talk & Show	Music Bank	Won	
