= We in the Zone =

South Korean boyband (2019–2021)

- Origin: Seoul, South Korea
- Genres: K-pop; hip hop
- Years active: 2019–2021
- Labels: Choon
- Spinoffs: Jooan X Eson
- Past members: Min; Kyeongheon; Eson; Jooan; Shihyun

We in the Zone (Hangul: 위인더존) was a South Korean boy band formed in Seoul in 2019 under Choon Entertainment. The group was composed of five members: Min, Kyeongheon, Eson, Jooan, and Shihyun. They debuted on May 27, 2019 with their self-titled mini album.

== History ==
=== Pre-debut ===
Shihyun participated in the Mnet survival series Produce 101 Season 2 in 2017. He left the show before its official airing for medical reasons. He later debuted in the duo group Longguo & Shihyun with the album the.the.the, which would in turn quietly disband. Shihyun released "Sweet Potato X 100" with Kim So-hee. He later participated in MBC survival show Under Nineteen in 2018, placing tenth in the final episode.

During late 2018, Choon Entertainment announced a new boy group by the name of WITZ. The group consisted of Eson, Jooan, and Kyeongheon. Eson and Jooan both released mixtapes. WITZ released dance covers on their YouTube channel.

In April, it was announced that WITZ would be debuting with the additional members Shihyun and Min.

=== 2019–2021: Debut, We in the Zone, Min's and Kyungheon's departure, and disbandment ===
The group originally announced the debut date to be May 29, but was later changed to the 27th of the month. Leading up to the release of the album, the group revealed album prologues for each member. On May 27, 2019, the group debuted with their self-titled mini album with a few self-produced songs. They held their debut show case at Hongdae Hana Tour V Hall in Seoul, performing a number of songs off of the album including their title track "Let's Get Loud".

On October 23, Min left the group and terminated his contract for personal reasons.

On January 15, 2021, Kyeongheon announced via Instagram he would be leaving the group. Kyeongheon also revealed on Instagram that the members have terminated their contracts with Choon Entertainment.

== Former members ==
- Min (민)
- Kyeongheon (경헌)
- Eson (이슨)
- Jooan (주안)
- Shihyun (시현)

== Discography ==
=== Extended plays ===
Title	Album details	Peak chart positions	Sales
Title	Album details	KOR	Sales
We in the Zone	Released: May 27, 2019; Label: Choon Entertainment; Formats: CD, digital download	17	KOR: 8,830
Weeee!	Released: October 30, 2019; Label: Choon Entertainment; Formats: CD, digital download	13	KOR: 8,327

=== Singles ===
Title	Year	Peak positions	Sales	Album
Title	Year	KOR	Sales	Album
"Let's Get Loud"	2019	—	—N/a	We in the Zone
"Wish List"	2019	—	—N/a	Non-album single
"Loveade"	2019	—	—N/a	Weeee!
"Be Your Star"	2020	—	—N/a	Non-album single
"You Bought YSL Tint" (라고 말해도)	2020	—	—N/a	Non-album single
"—" denotes items that did not chart or were not released in that area.
