= Yoon Ji-sung =

South Korean singer

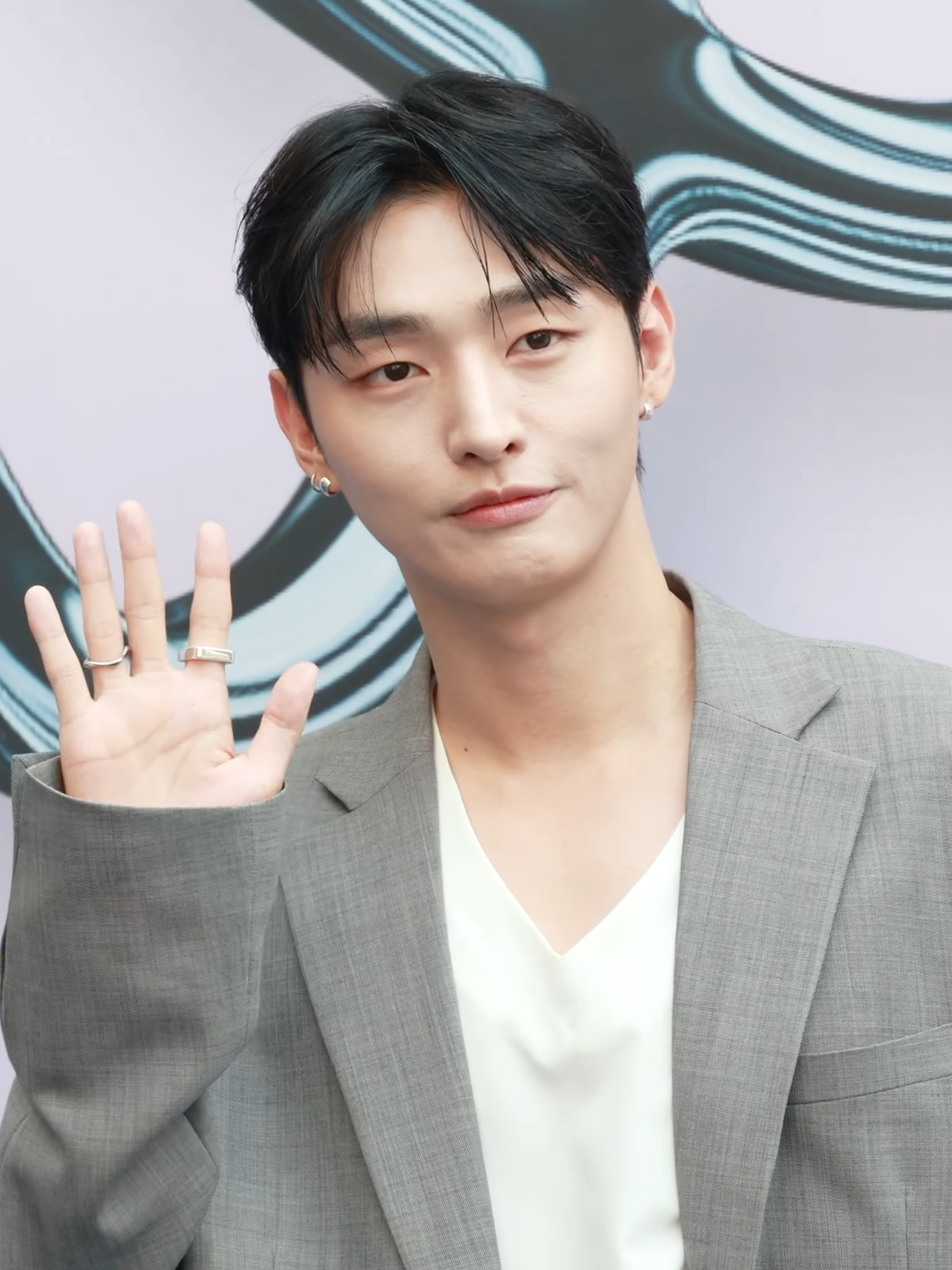
- Yoon in September 2024
- Born: March 8, 1991 (age 35); Wonju, Gangwon Province, South Korea
- Education: National High School of Traditional Arts, Seoul, South Korea; Myongji University; Dongguk University
- Occupations: Singer; actor
- Years active: 2017–present
- Musical career
- Genre: K-pop
- Instrument: Vocals
- Labels: DG; LM; MMO; YMC (Note: As a member of Wanna One only.); Swing; Billions
- Formerly of: Wanna One

Korean name
- Hangul: 윤지성
- Hanja: 尹智聖
- RR: Yun Jiseong
- MR: Yun Chisŏng

Signature
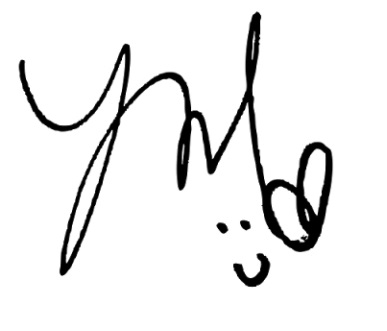

Yoon Ji-sung (Korean: 윤지성; born March 8, 1991) is a South Korean singer and actor. He is best known for finishing eighth in the second series of Produce 101 and is the former leader of South Korean boy group Wanna One. Following Wanna One's disbandment, Yoon established his career as a solo artist with the release of his first extended play Aside on February 20, 2019.

== Career ==
=== Early life and pre-debut ===
Yoon Ji-sung was born as Yoon Byeong-ok (윤병옥) in Wonju, South Korea.

=== 2017–2019: Produce 101 and Wanna One ===
In April 2017, Yoon, alongside Kang Daniel, Kim Jae-han, Joo Jin-woo and Choi Tae-woong participated in Produce 101 Season 2 as trainees of MMO Entertainment. Yoon placed eighth in the show's final episode and made his debut with Wanna One during Wanna One Premier Show-Con on August 7, 2017, at the Gocheok Sky Dome with the debut mini-album 1X1=1 (To Be One).

Yoon actively promoted with Wanna One until its official disbandment on December 31, 2018 and continued to appear with the group until its final concert series Therefore, held at the Gocheok Sky Dome from January 24 to 27, 2019.

=== 2019–present: Solo debut and military service ===
In January 2019, Yoon was cast as the male lead in the musical The Days.

He then released his first EP Aside on February 20, 2019 before embarking on his first fan meeting tour of the same name in Seoul, Macau, Taipei, Tokyo, Osaka and Bangkok.

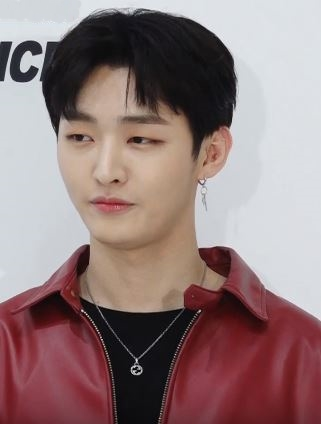
Yoon in April 2019

On April 25, 2019, Yoon released a special album, Dear Diary, and subsequently held special fan meetings in Tokyo, Osaka and Seoul.

He released the digital single "Winter Flower" on May 19, 2019, as a gift for his fans, after his enlistment as an active-duty soldier on May 14, 2019. The song was composed by and gifted to Yoon by Korean indie singer Coffee Boy.

During his enlistment, Yoon was cast in the military musical Return: The Promise of the Day. He was expected to be discharged from the military on December 13, 2020, but he was discharged early from the military due to COVID-19 protocol on November 20, 2020.

Yoon returned with his second EP Temperature of Love on April 15, 2021.

On April 6, 2022, it was announced that Yoon had signed an exclusive contract with DG Entertainment. He released his third EP Miro on April 27, 2022.

Yoon's first solo concert Miro: Prologue was held on May 14 and 15 at the COEX Artium.

On November 21, 2022, DG Entertainment announced that Yoon would be releasing "December 24th", a winter single, through various online music sites on December 5 and holding an offline fan concert on December 24.

On June 27, 2024, DG Entertainment announced that the company and Yoon have agreed to terminate their contract as of June 26, 2024. On November 1, Yoon signed an exclusive contract with Billions.

== Discography ==
=== Extended plays ===
List of extended plays, with selected chart positions and sales
Title	EP details	Peak chart positions	Sales
Title	EP details	KOR	Sales
Aside	Released: February 20, 2019; Label: LM Entertainment; Formats: CD, digital download, streaming; Track listing: 1. "Clover"; 2. "In the Rain"; 3. "Who Are You" (또 웃기만 해); 4. "Why Not Me?" (왜 내가 아닌지); 5. "You... Like the Wind" (바람 같은 너) (feat. Changbin); 6. "Slow" (쉼표)	2	KOR: 46,873
Dear Diary	Released: April 25, 2019; Label: LM Entertainment; Formats: CD, digital download, streaming	4	KOR: 21,674
Temperature of Love	Released: April 15, 2021; Label: LM Entertainment; Formats: CD, digital download, streaming; Track listing: 1. "Night Walk" (밤을 핑계 삼아); 2. "Love Song"; 3. "Love Counseling" (고민상담); 4. "Sunday Moon"; 5. "I Hope" (괜찮아지기를 바라요)	8	KOR: 29,712
Miro	Released: April 27, 2022; Label: DG Entertainment; Formats: CD, digital download, streaming; Track listing: 1. "ToDogToDog" (with Bero); 2. "Bloom; 3. "Summer Drive" (feat. Jonghyun); 4. "Florescence" (걷는다); 5. "Sleep"	17	KOR: 9,887

=== Singles ===
Title	Year	Peak chart positions		Album
Title	Year	KOR	KOR Hot	Album
"In the Rain"	2019	140	96	Aside
"I'll Be There" (너의 페이지)	2019	— (Note: "I'll Be There" did not enter the Gaon Digital Chart, but appeared at number 83 on the component Download chart.)	—	Dear Diary
"Winter Flower" (동,화 (冬,花))	2019	—	—	Non-album single
"Love Song"	2021	— (Note: "Love Song" did not enter the Gaon Digital Chart, but appeared at number 83 on the component Download chart.)	—	Temperature of Love
"Bloom"	2022	— (Note: "Bloom" did not enter the Gaon Digital Chart, but appeared at number 110 on the component Download chart.)	—	Miro
"—" denotes items that did not chart or were not released in that region.

=== Soundtrack appearances ===
Title	Year	Peak chart positions		Album
Title	Year	KOR	KOR Hot	Album
"My Tree" (나무)	2021	— (Note: "My Tree" did not enter the Gaon Digital Chart, but appeared at number 189 on the component Download chart.)	—	How to Be Thirty OST Part 2
"—" denotes items that did not chart or were not released in that region.

== Theatre ==
Production	Role	Venue	Dates	Ref.
The Days	Kang Moo-young	Interpark Hall, Blue Square	February 22 – May 6, 2019	
Return: The Promise of the Day	Choi Woo-joo	Woori Art Hall, Olympic Park	October 22 – December 1, 2019	
Return: The Promise of the Day	Choi Woo-joo	Korean Provincial Tour	January 17 – February 2, 2020	
Return: The Promise of the Day	Past Seungho	Woori Art Hall, Olympic Park	June 4 – July 12, 2020	
Return: The Promise of the Day	Past Seungho	Online broadcast	September 25 – 26, 2020	
Something Rotten!	Shakespeare	Universal Arts Center	December 23, 2021 – January 9, 2022	

== Filmography ==
=== Television series ===
Year	Title	Role	Notes	Ref.
2021	Let Me Be Your Knight	Kim Yoo-chan		

=== Web series ===
Year	Title	Role	Ref.
2025	Thundercloud Rainstorm	Lee Il-jo	

=== Television shows ===
Year	Title	Role	Notes
2017	Produce 101 (season 2)	Contestant	Finished 8th
2019	King of Mask Singer	Contestant	Ep. 185–186
2021	Crazy Recipe Adventure	Contestant	Ep. 4
2022	My House Sangjeon	Cast Member	

=== Web shows ===
Year	Title	Role	Ref.
2021	Adola School	Teacher	

== Awards and nominations ==
Year	Award	Category	Nominated work(s)	Result	Ref.
2019	Stagetalk Audience Choice Awards	Rookie Musical Actor	The Days, Return	Nominated	
