= Jin Longguo =

Chinese singer (born 1996)

- 金龙国
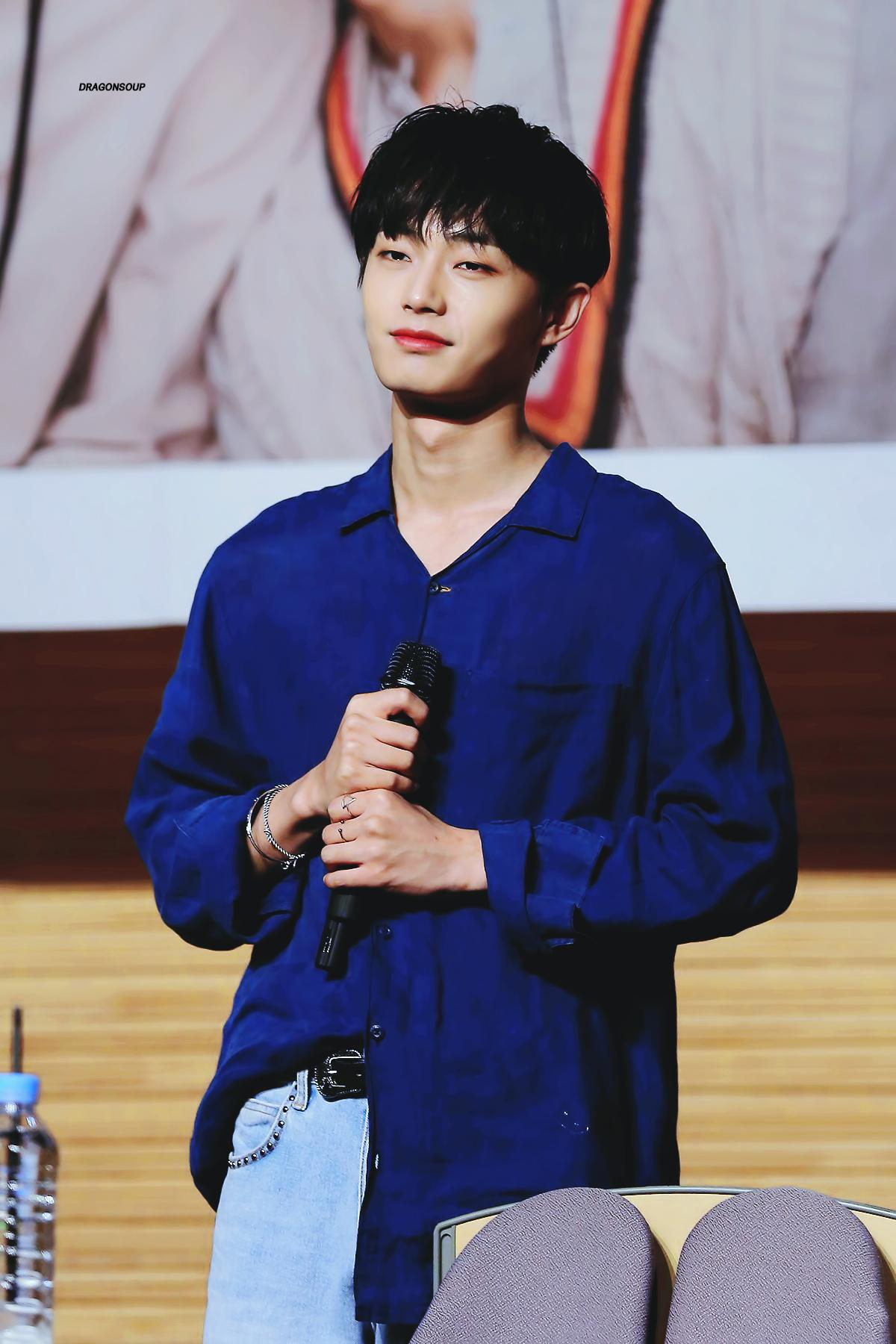
- Longguo in 2017
- Born: March 2, 1996 (age 30); Helong, Yanbian Korean Autonomous Prefecture, Jilin, China
- Other names: Kim Yong-guk
- Occupation: Singer
- Years active: 2017–present
- Musical career
- Origin: Seoul, South Korea
- Genres: K-pop; R&B
- Instrument: Vocal
- Labels: Choon; Fave
- Formerly of: JBJ; Longguo & Shihyun

Chinese name
- Simplified Chinese: 金龙国
- Traditional Chinese: 金龍國
Transcriptions
Standard Mandarin
- Hanyu Pinyin: Jīn Lóngguó

Korean name
- Hangul: 김용국
- Hanja: 金龍國
- RR: Gim Yongguk
- MR: Kim Yongguk

Jin Longguo (Chinese: 金龙国; Korean: 김용국; born March 2, 1996) is a Chinese singer based in South Korea. He is best known for being a member of the South Korean project boy band JBJ, and for finishing 21st in the survival show Produce 101 Season 2.

== Life and career ==
Jin Longguo was born in Helong, Jilin, China, on March 2, 1996, to a family of the ethnic Korean minority in China. He is a descendant of the Gimhae Kim clan.

Jin made his solo debut on June 13, 2018, with "Clover" featuring Yoon Mirae and made a comeback on August 29, 2019, with "Irresistible."

On November 11, 2018, Jin posted a picture of a handwritten letter denying dating rumors with Sonamoo's Nahyun and explaining the controversy of one of his cats: his old cat was put up for adoption but ran away. When found, his ear had been clipped, to show he was considered a stray and was recently sterilized, implying mistreatment from Jin. His appearances on The Show were cancelled. The same day, more controversies arose after Jin's private Instagram was hacked and its contents released, with claims of bullying other JBJ members, misogyny, and disrespect towards fans. Jin wrote an apology letter in response.

== Discography ==
=== Extended plays ===
| Title | Album details | Peak chart positions | Sales |
| Title | Album details | KOR | Sales |
|---|---|---|---|
| Friday n Night | Released: August 29, 2018; Label: Choon Entertainment, NHN Entertainment; Formats: CD, digital download | 4 | KOR: 24,273 |
| Mono Diary | Released: August 29, 2019; Label: Choon Entertainment; Formats: CD, digital download, streaming | 27 | KOR: 6,256 |

== See also ==
- Produce 101 (season 2)
