= ENOi =

South Korean boy band

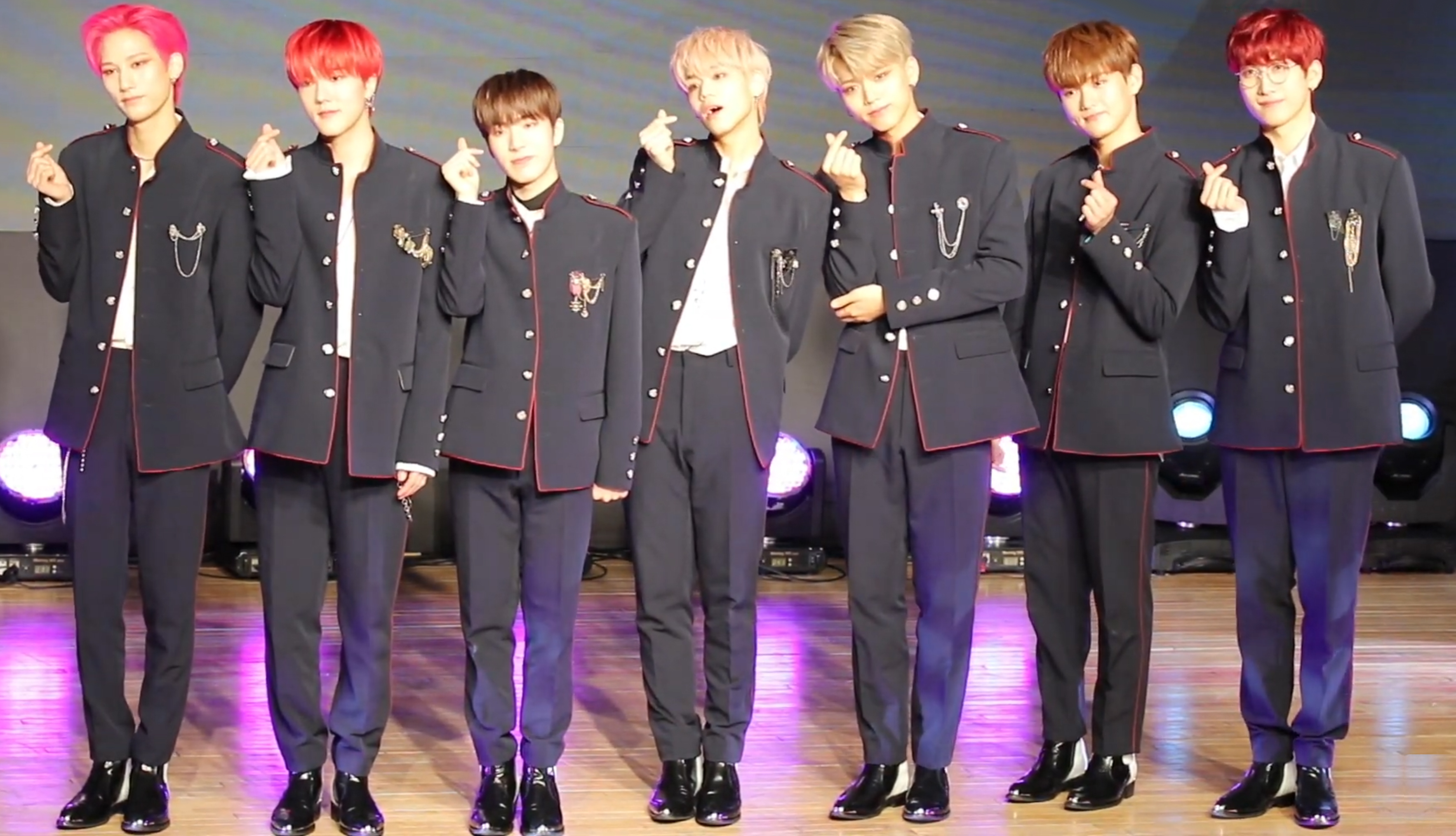
- ENOi in January 2020

Background information
- Origin: Seoul, South Korea
- Genres: K-pop
- Years active: 2019–2021
- Labels: KiTheWhale
- Past members: Laon; Dojin; Hamin; Avin; Jinwoo; J-kid; Gun
- Website: www.kithewhale.com

ENOi (Korean: 이엔오아이) was a seven member South Korean boy band formed by KiTheWhale in 2019. The group debuted on April 19, 2019, with "Bloom". They disbanded on January 22, 2021.

== Former members ==
- Laon (라온) - leader, vocalist
- Dojin (도진) - rapper
- Hamin (하민) - vocalist
- Avin (어빈) - vocalist
- Jinwoo (진우) - vocalist
- J-kid (제이키드) - vocalist
- Gun (건) - rapper

== Discography ==
=== Special albums ===
Title	Details	Peak chart positions	Sales
Title	Details	KOR	Sales
For RAYS, Realize All Your Star	Released: December 19, 2019; Label: KiTheWhale, Sound Republica; Formats: CD, digital download	79	KOR: 472
W.A.Y (雨)	Released: August 6, 2020; Label: KiTheWhale, Kakao M; Formats: CD, digital download	35	KOR: 5,779

=== Extended plays ===
Title	Details	Peak chart positions	Sales
Title	Details	KOR	Sales
Red in the Apple	Released: January 12, 2020; Label: KiTheWhale, Kakao M; Formats: CD, digital download	49	KOR: 1,818

=== Singles ===
Title	Year	Album
"Bloom"	2019	Non-album singles
"Starlight"	2019	For RAYS, Realize All Your Star
"Cheeky"	2020	Red In The Apple
"W.A.Y (Where Are You)"	2020	W.A.Y
"—" denotes releases that did not chart or were not released in that region.
