= Over and Over (EP) =

EP by Kim Ji Yeon
- Released: October 8, 2019
- Recorded: 2019
- Genre: K-pop; R&B
- Length: 20:59
- Language: Korean
- Label: Woollim; Kakao M
- Producer: Lee Jung-yeop (exec.)

Singles from Over and Over
- 1. "I Go" Released: October 8, 2019

Music video
- "I Go" on YouTube

Over and Over is the debut extended play by South Korean singer Kim Ji-yeon (also known as Kei). It was released on October 8, 2019 by Woollim Entertainment and distributed by Kakao M. The EP contains six tracks, including the lead single "I Go".

== Background and release ==
On September 27, 2019, Woollim Entertainment announced Kei would make her solo debut with the extended play "Over and Over", under her real name Kim Ji-yeon. The album and the lead single "I Go" music video were released on October 8.

== Composition ==
The lead single "I Go" was composed by Junzo and TAK and written by Junzo and ARRAN. It is a song with "a beautiful piano melody and hopeful sounds of string instruments."

== Track listing ==
No.	Title	Lyrics	Music	Arrangement	Length
1.	"Back in the Day"		Junzo; TAK	Junzo; TAK	1:17
2.	"I Go"	Junzo; ARRAN	Junzo; TAK	Junzo; TAK; Jung Dong-hwan	4:26
3.	"Dreaming"	SEION	SEION	SEION	3:55
4.	"Paper Moon" (종이달)	STAINBOYS; Jessica Oh	STAINBOYS; Jungjin	STAINBOYS	3:36
5.	"Cry"	Park Ji-yeon; Issue Maker; Yanghwan; ZigZagNote	Park Ji-yeon; Issue Maker; Yanghwan; ZigZagNote	Park Ji-yeon; Issue Maker; Yanghwan; ZigZagNote	3:26
6.	"Rain" (이 비) (雨)	Stardust; Choi Moon-suk	Stardust; Choi Moon-suk	Stardust	4:15
Total length:					20:59
