= Kenta Sanggyun =

South Korean musical duo

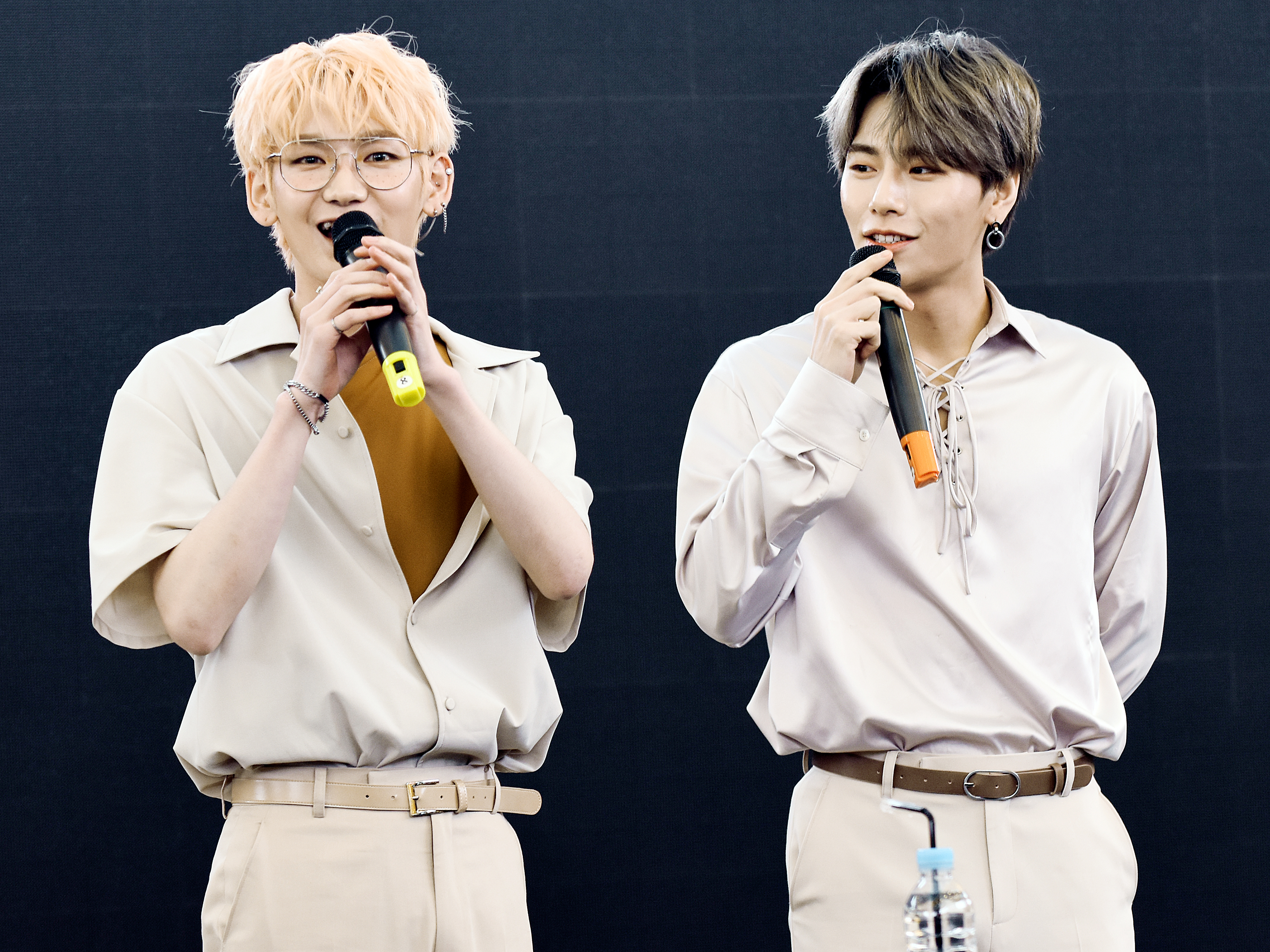
- Kenta Sanggyun at Starfield in Goyang, March 2019

Background information
- Also known as: JBJ95
- Origin: Seoul, South Korea
- Genres: K-pop; Dance-pop
- Years active: 2018–present
- Labels: Star Road; Kenta Sanggyun
- Members: Kenta; Sanggyun
- Website: www.jbj95.com

Kenta Sanggyun (stylized as KENTA • SANGGYUN; formerly JBJ95) is a South Korean duo consisting of Kenta Takada and Kim Sang-gyun. They debuted on October 30, 2018, with the single Home.

== History ==
=== 2018: Formation and debut ===
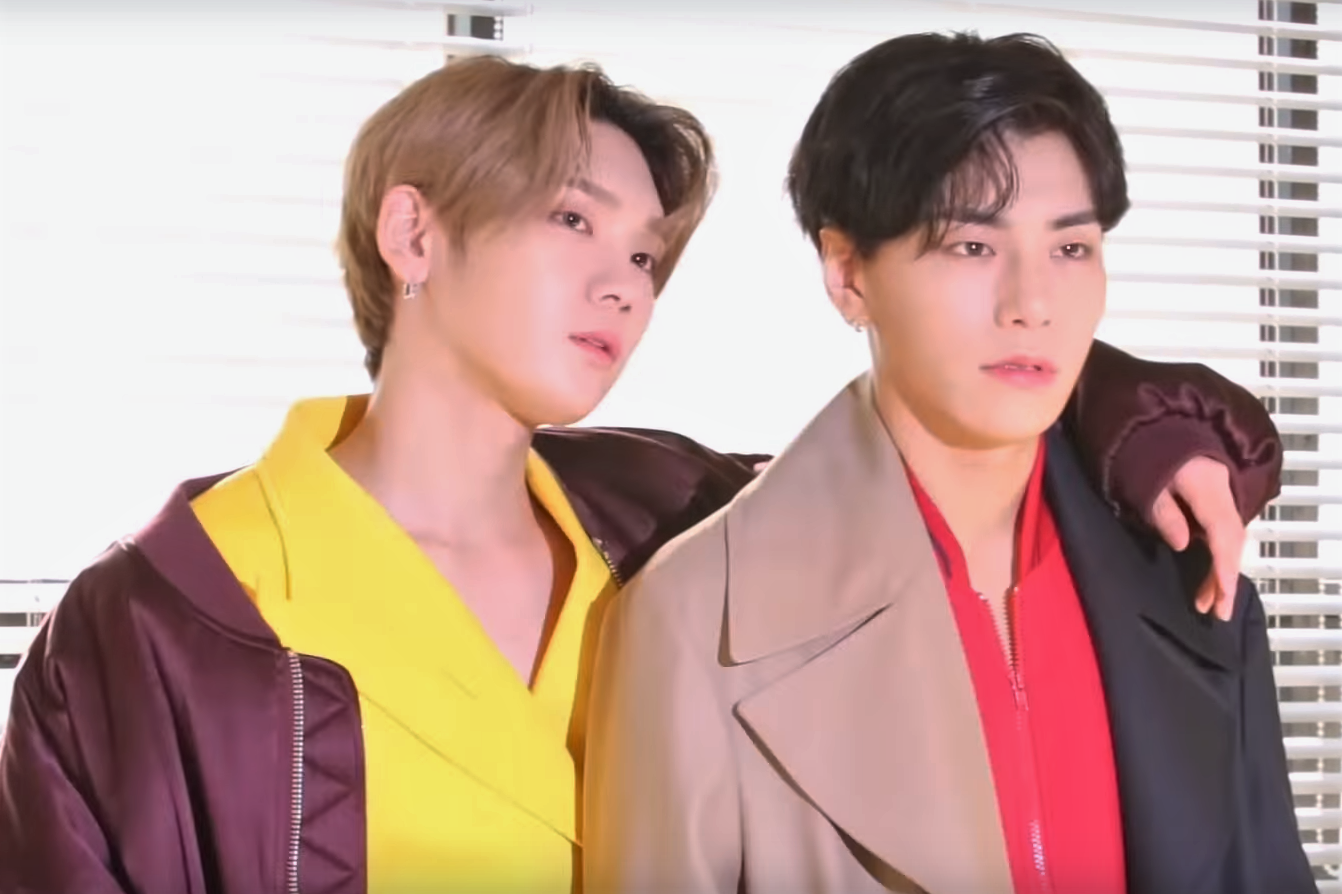
JBJ95 in October 2018

Shortly after JBJ disbanded, it was revealed that Sanggyun and Kenta would continue to collaborate, starring together in a web drama produced jointly by Star Road Entertainment and SBS called Barefoot Diva (Korean: 맨발의 디바). Both Sanggyun and Kenta also released a song called Picture for the Barefoot Diva: OST album.

During a joint fan-meeting held in Seoul on July 7, 2018, Sanggyun and Kenta announced that they would be forming a permanent duo, with its name yet to be decided. On August 17, the duo officially revealed their name, JBJ95, a title which commemorates JBJ while also referring to their mutual birth year of 1995.

JBJ95 held their debut showcase on October 30, 2018, following the release of their first EP entitled Home.

=== 2019–2020: Awake, Spark, digital single "Only One", and Jasmin ===
On March 10, 2019, it was announced that Sanggyun had exited Hunus Entertainment and signed an exclusive contract with Star Road Entertainment, making JBJ95 exclusively managed by Star Road. Their second EP, Awake, was released on March 26, 2019, at a Seoul Showcase. Following promotions for the EP, it was announced that Sanggyun was cast in an upcoming KBS drama called Let Me Hear Your Song, set to broadcast in July 2019.

On August 6, 2019, JBJ95 released their third EP, Spark, with the title track of the same name. They released a digital single "Only One" on December 6, 2019.

On October 28, 2020, JBJ95 released their fourth EP, Jasmin, with the title track of the same name.

=== 2021–present: Lawsuit, Japan activities, Love Countdown, "Miracle" ===
On April 14, 2021, JBJ95 announced that they would be filing a lawsuit against Star Road Entertainment to terminate their contracts, citing lack of management and payment issues.

In August 2022, the duo began promoting in Japan under the name KENTA・SANGGYUN after opening a new Twitter account to announce their upcoming Japan mini concert, KENTA・SANGGYUN Mini Concert in Japan 「Dear My Friend -夕暮れの交差点で君と会う-」, to be held November 2022.

On October 24, 2022, it was confirmed that the duo had won their lawsuit to terminate their exclusive contracts with Star Road Entertainment.

On October 28, 2022, they released the lyric video for the song "Dreams".

On August 19, 2024, they announced that they will be holding their 6th Anniversary Fancon "Frequency" in Japan on October 20. Additionally, they will be releasing a new song.

On October 15, 2024, they announced their first EP Love Countdown, set to be released on October 16 under name Kenta Sanggyun.

On December 31, 2024, they released the special digital single "Miracle".

On March 6, 2025, they will release their first EP Hello From The Other Side.

== Members ==
- Kenta Takada (타카다 켄타/髙田健太) – vocals
- Kim Sang-gyun (김상균) – rap

== Discography ==
=== EPs ===
Title	Details	Peak chart positions	Sales
Title	Details	KOR	Sales
Love Countdown	Released: October 16, 2024; Label: Kenta Sanggyun; Formats: CD, digital download, streaming; Track listing: 1. "Love Countdown"; 2. "Spirit/Kiai (氣合; 기합)"; 3. "Dreams"; 4. "Love Countdown (Sped-Up Ver.)"		

=== Mini albums ===
Title	Details	Peak chart positions	Sales
Title	Details	KOR	Sales
Home	Released: October 30, 2018; Label: Star Road Entertainment; Formats: CD, digital download, streaming; Track listing: 1. "Love Dive"; 2. "Home"; 3. "Stay" (됐어); 4. "Thinkin' About You" (생각나); 5. "Before the Show" (거울 앞에); 6. "In Dreams" (꿈에서); 7. "Tonight" (오늘밤); 8. "Home" (Instrumental)	3	KOR: 54,236
Awake	Released: March 26, 2019; Label: Star Road Entertainment; Formats: CD, digital download, streaming; Track listing: 1. "Friend Zone"; 2. "Awake"; 3. "Who Am I" (좋아해); 4. "Milky Way"; 5. "Leave It to Me"; 6. "Lookin 4 Love"	3	KOR: 46,171
Spark	Released: August 6, 2019; Label: Star Road Entertainment; Formats: CD, digital download, streaming; Track listing: 1. "In the Morning" (아침이면); 2. "Unreal" (응원법); 3. "Spark" (불꽃처럼); 4. "Hey, Summer"; 5. "Crush"	3	KOR: 31,915
Jasmin	Released: October 28, 2020; Label: Star Road Entertainment; Formats: CD, digital download, streaming; Track listing: 1. "Shadubidu"; 2. "Jasmin"; 3. "Tell Me" (대답해); 4. "Seoulite"; 5. "Only One"	14	KOR: 19,935

=== Singles ===
Title	Year	Peak chart positions			Album
Title	Year	KOR	KOR Hot	US World	Album
JBJ95
"Home"	2018	—	—	—	Home
"Awake"	2019	—	—	—	Awake
"Spark" (불꽃처럼)	2019	—	—	—	Spark
"Only One"	2019	—	—	—	Jasmin
"Jasmin"	2020	—	—	—	Jasmin
KENTA • SANGGYUN
"Love Countdown"	2024	—	—	—	Love Countdown
"Miracle"	2024	—	—	—	Non-album singles
"Hello From The Other Side"	2025	—	—	—	Hello From The Other Side
"—" denotes releases that did not chart or were not released in that region.

== Soundtrack appearances ==
Title	Year	Album	Ref.
"I laugh, again" ( 자꾸 웃음이나)	2018	Perfume OST (Part 4)	

== Filmography ==
- Produce 101 (season 2) (2017) - Contestants
- Barefoot Diva (2018) - Sang-gyun as Lee Joon-kyung; Kenta as Haru
- My Neighbor, Charles (Ep. 163, 2018) - Kenta and Sanggyun, documentary and interview
- "I Wanna Hear Your Song" (2019) - Sang-gyun as Moon Jae-hyeong
- "Idol Recipe" (2021) - Kenta as Reddy
