= Argon (band) =

South Korean boy band

- Origin: Seoul, South Korea
- Genres: K-pop
- Years active: 2019–2021
- Labels: MSH Entertainment
- Past members: Kain; Haneul; Roel; Yeoun; Gon; Jaeun

Argon (Korean: 아르곤; stylized as ARGON) was a six-member boy band from South Korea. The group made their debut on March 11, 2019, with the release of their first single album Master Key, and its lead single of the same name.

== History ==
=== Pre-debut ===
In 2016, Jaeun made his debut as a member of the boy band INX, using the stage name Win. INX released their debut digital single in 2016, and an album in April 2017 before filing a lawsuit against their agency. The group won the lawsuit in June 2018 and their contracts were terminated.

Kain previously worked as a backing dancer for BTS and has stated that he wanted to become a singer after touring with the group.

=== 2019—present: Debut ===
Argon's name is taken from the colourless chemical element Argon, meaning that the group is "not limited to a single color" and they can "absorb multiple genres". The name is also an acronym for "Art Go On", meaning that "art continues".

Argon released their first single album, Master Key, through various platforms on March 11, 2019. They held their debut showcase at the Ilji Art Hall in Gangnam the same day. The single album charted at number 70 on the Gaon Album Chart. On April 28, the group held their Argon 2019 1st Japan Live 'Masterkey' showcase in Tokyo, Japan, which kicked off a three-month Japanese promotional period for Master Key.

The group released their first extended play, titled Go Forward: Wide Dream, on October 2, 2019. The EP was fronted by its lead single, "Give Me Dat", and entered the Gaon Album Chart at number 54. The lyrics of "Give Me Dat" tell of the group's wishes to "rise to the top".

== Members ==
List of members and their positions, adapted from MSH Entertainment.

- Kain (카인) — Leader, rapper
- Haneul (하늘) — Rapper, vocalist
- Roel (로엘) — Vocalist
- Yeoun (여운) — Vocalist
- Gon (곤) — Vocalist
- Jaeun (재운) — Rapper

== Discography ==
=== Extended plays ===
Title	Album details	Peak chart positions	Sales
Title	Album details	KOR	Sales
Go Forward: Wide Dream	Released: October 2, 2019; Label: MSH Entertainment; Formats: CD, digital download, streaming	54	KOR: 483

=== Single albums ===
Title	Album details	Peak chart positions	Sales
Title	Album details	KOR	Sales
Master Key	Released: March 11, 2019; Label: MSH Entertainment; Formats: CD, digital download, streaming	70	KOR: 539

=== Singles ===
Title	Year	Peak chart positions	Sales (DL)	Album
Title	Year	KOR	Sales (DL)	Album
"Master Key"	2019	—	—N/a	Master Key
"Give Me Dat"	2019	—	—N/a	Go Forward: Wide Dream
"—" denotes releases that did not chart.
