= Dear Diary (EP) =

EP by Yoon Ji-sung
- Released: April 25, 2019
- Genres: K-pop; ballad
- Length: 17:26
- Label: LM

Yoon Ji-sung chronology
| Aside (2019) | Dear Diary (2019) | Temperature of Love (2021) |

Dear Diary is the second extended play by South Korean singer Yoon Ji-sung. The album was released digitally and physically on April 25, 2019 by LM Entertainment. The album contains five tracks, including the lead single "I'll be there".

== Background ==
On April 15, the album trailer was released, followed by the tracklist, concept photos and music video teasers. A highlight medley was also released on Yoon's VLIVE channel and YouTube account, leading up to the full release of the album on April 25. On May 14, the epilogue for the album was released on YouTube as a parting gift to fans before Yoon's military enlistment that day.

== Track listing ==
| No. | Title | Lyrics | Music | Arranged | Length |
|---|---|---|---|---|---|
| 1. | "옆에도 눈이 달렸어 (Side, Eye, Moon)" | 도나 (DONNA) | 도나 (DONNA); CuzD | CuzD | 2:58 |
| 2. | "너의 페이지 (I'll be there)" | 손고은 (MonoTree) | 손고은 (MonoTree); 임단우 | 손고은 (MonoTree) | 3:16 |
| 3. | "나의 하루 (End of the Day)" | Moon Kim; 정윤 (CHUNGYOON) | Moon Kim; 정윤 (CHUNGYOON) | 정윤 (CHUNGYOON); Moon Kim | 3:35 |
| 4. | "배웅 (Hi, Spring)" | 어깨깡패 (Clef Crew) | 어깨깡패 (Clef Crew) | 어깨깡패 (Clef Crew) | 3:39 |
| 5. | "기적 (Miracle)" | KZ; 전다운; Who's H | KZ; 전다운; Who's H | KZ; 전다운; Who's H | 3:56 |
| Total length: | | | | | 17:24 |

== Charts ==
| Chart (2019) | Peak position |
|---|---|
| South Korean Albums (Gaon) | 4 |

== Sales ==
| Chart | Sales |
|---|---|
| Korea (Gaon) | 23,428 |
