= Longguo & Shihyun =

2017–2018 South Korean musical duo

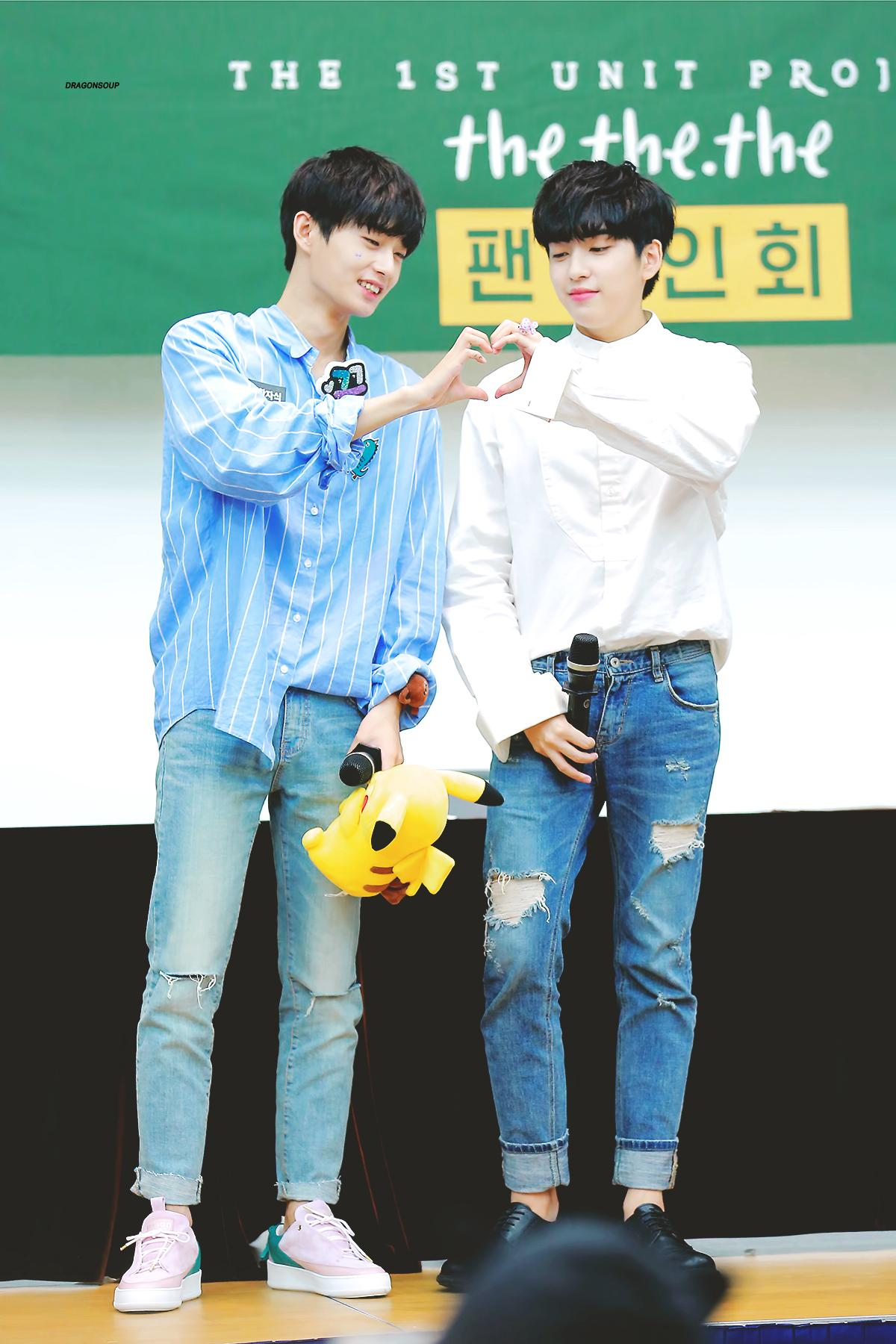

Background information
- Origin: Seoul, South Korea
- Genres: K-pop; electronica
- Years active: 2017–2018
- Labels: Choon
- Past members: Longguo; Shihyun

Longguo & Shihyun (Korean: 용국 & 시현) is a South Korean duo formed by Choon Entertainment in Seoul, South Korea. The duo previously participated in Produce 101 Season 2. They debuted on July 31, 2017, with the single "the.the.the". Longguo was a member of fan-made project boy group JBJ, having signed a seven-month contract with the label Fave Entertainment.

== Members ==
- Longguo (용국)
- Shihyun (시현)

== Discography ==
=== Extended plays ===
Title	Album details	Peak chart positions	Sales
Title	Album details	KOR	Sales
the.the.the	Released: July 31, 2017; Label: Choon Entertainment, NHN Entertainment; Formats: CD, digital download, streaming; Track listing: 1. Stay Here; 2. the.the.the 3. Love Taste; 4. Wonderland	5	KOR: 33,550

=== Singles ===
Title	Year	Peak chart positions	Sales (DL)	Album
Title	Year	KOR	Sales (DL)	Album
"the.the.the"	2017	—	KOR: 22,667	the.the.the
"—" denotes releases that did not chart.

== Awards and nominations ==
=== Golden Disc Awards ===
Year	Nominee / work	Award	Result
2018	Longguo & Shihyun	New Artist of the Year	Nominated
2018	Longguo & Shihyun	Global Popularity Award	Nominated
