= 1the9 =

South Korean boy band

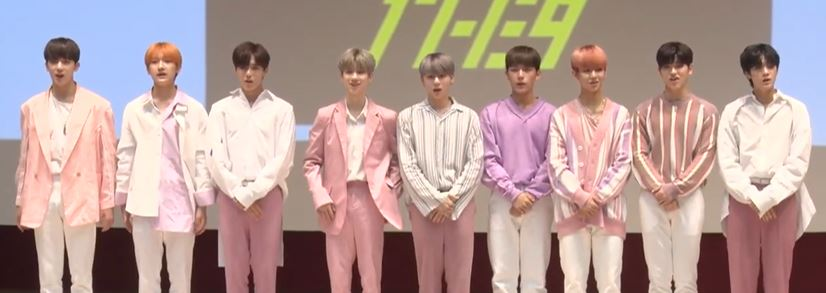
- 1the9 in April 2019; From left to right: Yechan, Sungwon, Junseo, Doyum, Taewoo, Taekhyeon, Jinsung, Seunghwan, and Yongha.

Background information
- Origin: Seoul, South Korea
- Genres: K-pop
- Years active: 2019–2020
- Label: PocketDol Studio
- Past members: Yoo Yong-ha; Kim Tae-woo; Lee Seung-hwan; Shin Ye-chan; Kim Jun-seo; Jeon Do-yum; Jung Jin-sung; Jeong Taek-hyeon; Park Sung-won

1the9 (Korean: 원더나인, stylized as 1THE9, pronounced as "Wonder Nine") was a South Korean boy band formed through the 2018 survival competition Under Nineteen. The group was composed of 9 members: Yoo Yong-ha, Kim Tae-woo, Lee Seung-hwan, Shin Ye-chan, Kim Jun-seo, Jeon Do-yum, Jung Jin-sung, Jeong Taek-hyeon and Park Sung-won. The group's debuting members were announced on February 9, 2019 and was initially slated to be promoting under PocketDol Studio for 12 months. After delays surrounding the COVID-19 pandemic, the group disbanded in August 2020.

== History ==
=== Pre-debut: Under Nineteen ===
1THE9 was formed through the 'survival' competition series Under Nineteen, which aired on MBC from November 3, 2018 until February 9, 2019. Out of an initial 57 trainees participating, the final 9 were chosen by the audience voting and announced via live television broadcast.

During the final broadcast the final members were ranked and marked to debut by votes from the fans. It was announced that the final lineup would do a V Live to thank the fans two hours after the show as well as their name. It was later announced that vocal team director Crush would be writing and producing the groups debuting single.

Although their official debut is scheduled for April, they will be participating in "Under Nineteen's Final Concert" on February 23, 2019 performing songs from the show with the other contestants. Since the show, the members have performed the single "Like a Magic" on music shows and has used it as a pre-debut promotion single.

=== 2019: XIX and Blah Blah ===
On February 22, 2019, it was announced that their official debut was set for April 12 with a concert later on in the month with their Japan debut. It was also announced that a reality show for the group will begin airing on March 22. Their Japan debut was put on hold due to MBK wanting to focus on promotions in South Korean first.

A series of individual teasers was released per member before the debut timeline was announced. On April 5 the debut timeline started and the name of the album was revealed to be XIX with the title track being "Spotlight". A pre-debut track "Domino" featuring Crush was released on April 7 leading up to their official debut on April 13. 1THE9 began promoting the album with "Spotlight" on various music shows.

On April 17, they held their debut stage through a V Live special for an hour and thirty minutes. They performed 3 songs, played games, and announced the fandom name and color to be Wonderland and Lime Punch, respectively.

On October 3, 2019, it was announced that they would return with their second mini-album Blah Blah on October 17.

=== 2020: Turn Over, Good Bye 1the9 and disbandment ===
On July 6, 2020, it was announced that they would release their third mini-album Turn Over on July 16.

On July 27, 2020, it was confirmed that the group would officially disband on August 8. Before their disbandment, the group released their final EP Good Bye 1the9 on August 5.

== Members ==
- Yoo Yong-ha (유용하) - leader
- Kim Tae-woo (김태우)
- Lee Seung-hwan (이승환)
- Shin Ye-chan (신예찬)
- Kim Jun-seo (김준서)
- Jeon Do-yeom (전도염)
- Jung Jin-sung (정진성)
- Jeong Taek-hyeon (정택현)
- Park Sung-won (박성원)

== Filmography ==
=== Television ===
Year	Network	Program	Ref.
2018–2019	MBC	Under Nineteen	
2019	MBC	Wonderland	

=== Radio ===
Year	Network	Program
2019	MBC	Idol Radio
2019	MBC FM4U	Kim Shin Young's Noon Song of Hope

== Discography ==
=== Extended plays ===
Title	Details	Peak chart position	Sales
Title	Details	KOR	Sales
XIX	Released: April 13, 2019; Label: PocketDol Studio, Kakao M; Formats: CD, digital download, streaming	7	KOR: 20,706
Blah Blah	Released: October 17, 2019; Label: PocketDol Studio, Kakao M; Formats: CD, digital download, streaming	15	KOR: 13,454
Turn Over	Released: July 16, 2020; Label: PocketDol Studio, Kakao M; Formats: CD, digital download, streaming	23	KOR: 11,920
Good Bye 1the9	Released: August 5, 2020; Label: PocketDol Studio, Kakao M; Formats: CD, digital download, streaming	24	KOR: 7,500

=== Singles ===
Title	Year	Peak chart positions		Album
Title	Year	KOR	JPN	Album
"Spotlight"	2019	—	—	XIX
"Blah"	2019	—	—	Blah Blah
"Bad Guy"	2020	—	—	Turn Over
"Count"	2020	—	—	Good Bye 1THE9

== Concert tours ==
- Under Nineteen Final Concert
