= Produce 101 season 1 =

Girl group survival reality show

Produce 101
- Season 1
- Promotional poster
- No. of episodes: 11

Release
- Original network: Mnet
- Original release: January 22 – April 1, 2016

Season chronology
- Next → Season 2

Produce 101 (Korean: 프로듀스 101) is a reality competition show created by Mnet. It premiered on January 22, 2016, at 22:00 KST and aired every Friday.

It is the first season of the South Korean version of the franchise of the same name. The second season premiered on April 7, 2017, this time featuring all male contestants.

== Concept and format ==
Produce 101 was a large-scale girl group unit project produced by CJ ENM and Signal Entertainment Group for Mnet. The show was produced in collaboration with 46 entertainment companies from both inside and outside of South Korea. At about four billion won (approximately $3.33 million), it had the second-largest budget out of all Mnet TV programs at the time.

The show's concept hinged on audience participation: the viewers got to choose the final group's members, concept, debut song, and name. Out of the 101 contestants, they could select eleven girls to debut. The resulting unit would release their debut extended play under Stone Music Entertainment and promote together for a year. The group would be co-managed by YMC Entertainment. After their contract period ended, the members were allowed to join any girl groups or projects that their agencies were planning.

== Promotions and broadcast ==
On December 17, 2015, 98 out of the 101 contestants were unveiled for the first time on Episode 453 of M Countdown, where they performed the show's theme song "Pick Me". The stage was presented by actor and singer Jang Keun-suk. From December 18 to 25, 2015, the participants were revealed via the official website, Facebook, Instagram, and Naver TV Cast. Each girl was introduced through a written profile, photos, and videos.

On January 21, 2016, a production presentation for the show was held at the 63 Convention Center in Yeouido, Seoul. The event was attended by the contestants, the presenter Jang Keun-suk, and the five vocal, dance, and rap mentors, namely Brown Eyed Girls' JeA, Kim Sung-eun, Kahi, Bae Yoon-jung, and Cheetah.

The trainees moved into the dorms on December 5, 2015. The stages for the first group mission were held at the CJ E&M studio in Ilsan on December 27, 2015.

In Japan, the first episode of Produce 101 aired on Mnet Japan on April 3, 2016, with the remaining episodes airing every Friday starting from April 8. In the Asia and North America regions, the show premiered on May 4, 2016, and was then broadcast through Channel M every Wednesday starting from May 11.

== Cast ==
The show was presented by actor and singer Jang Keun-suk.

The rest of the mentors, who were tasked with training the contestants in various categories, were:

- Vocal Trainers:
  - JeA
  - Kim Sung-eun
- Dance Trainers:
  - Kahi
  - Bae Yoon-jung
- Rap Trainer:
  - Cheetah
- Fitness Trainer:
  - Ray Yang

== Contestants ==
Color key (In order of contestant's rank on the show)

Final members of I.O.I
Contestants eliminated in the final episode
Contestants eliminated in the third elimination round
Contestants eliminated in the second elimination round
Contestants eliminated in the first elimination round
Contestants that left the show

101 contestants
Jeon So-mi (전소미)	Kim Se-jeong (김세정)	Choi Yoo-jung (최유정)	Kim Chung-ha (김청하)	Kim So-hye (김소혜)
Zhou Jieqiong (주결경)	Jung Chae-yeon (정채연)	Kim Do-yeon (김도연)	Kang Mi-na (강미나)	Lim Na-young (임나영)
Yoo Yeon-jung (유연정)	Han Hye-ri (한혜리)	Lee Su-hyun (이수현)	Kim Na-young (김나영)	Kim So-hee (김소희)
Yoon Chae-kyung (윤채경)	Lee Hae-in (이해인)	Park So-yeon (박소연)	Ki Hui-hyeon (기희현)	Jeon So-yeon (전소연)
Jung Eun-woo (정은우)	Kang Si-ra (강시라)	Ng Sze Kai (응 씨 카이)	Kim Dani (김다니)	Park Si-yeon (박시연)
Huh Chan-mi (허찬미)	Hwang In-sun (황인선)	Seong Hye-min (성혜민)	Kang Yae-bin (강예빈)	Kim Seo-kyoung (김서경)
Lee Soo-min (이수민)	An Ye-seul (안예슬)	Kim Hyung-eun (김형은)	Kim Ju-na (김주나)	Kwon Eun-bin (권은빈)
Kang Si-won (강시원)	Yoon Seo-hyung (윤서형)	Park Hae-young (박해영)	Hwang Soo-yeon (황수연)	Kim Si-hyeon (김시현)
Cho Shi-yoon (조시윤)	Kim Min-kyeung (김민경)	Park Se-hee (박세희)	Kim Min-ji (김민지)	Kim Min-jung (김민정)
Chu Ye-jin (추예진)	Jung Hae-rim (정해림)	Kang Gyeong-won (강경원)	Oh Seo-jung (오서정)	Kim Tae-ha (김태하)
Park Ha-yi (박하이)	Park Ga-eul (박가을)	Yu Su-a (유수아)	Lee Jin-hee (이진희)	Risa Ariyoshi (아리요시 리사)
Hwang A-young (황아영)	Lim Jung-min (임정민)	Kim Yeon-kyung (김연경)	Lee Yoon-seo (이윤서)	Shim Chae-eun (심채은)
Kang Si-hyeon (강시현)	Kim Da-jeong (김다정)	Ahn Yu-mi (안유미)	Kim Si-hyun (김시현)	Seo Hye-lin (서혜린)
Hwang Ri-yu (황리유)	Hwang Se-young (황세영)	Kim Ji-sung (김지성)	Kim Su-hyeon (김수현)	Choi Eun-bin (최은빈)
Park Min-ji (박민지)	Ham Ye-ji (함예지)	Kim Mi-so (김미소)	Kim Woo-jung (김우정)	Heo Saem (허샘)
Han Ji-yeon (한지연)	Shiori Niwa (니와 시오리)	Pyun Kang-yoon (편강윤)	Lee Su-hyun (이수현)	Kim Hong-eun (김홍은)
Kim Do-hee (김도희)	Kim Seol-a (김설아)	Oh Han-areum (오한아름)	Kim Yun-ji (김윤지)	Lee Seo-jeong (이서정)
Kim Ja-yeon (김자연)	Lee Chae-lin (이채린)	Choi Yu-bin (최유빈)	Katherine Lee (캐서린 리)	Shin Hye-hyeon (신혜현)
Nam Su-jin (남수진)	Kim Sol-ee (김솔이)	Lee Se-heun (이세흔)	Bang Joon-hee (방준희)	Yun Yu-dam (윤유담)
Kim Bo-seon (김보선)	Moon Hyun-ju (문현주)	Ma Eun-jin (마은진)	Lim Hyo-sun (임효선)	Im Kyung-ha (임경하)
Kim Ha-yun (김하윤)				

== Ranking ==
The top 11 contestants were chosen through popularity online voting via the official website and the audience's live voting, the results of which were shown at the end of each episode.

Color key

New Top 11 (Note: Indicates contestants who had never placed in the Top 10 in any prior elimination rounds or ranking announcements.)

List of Top 11 contestants
#	Episode 1	Episode 2	Episode 3	Episode 5	Episode 6	Episode 8	Episode 10	Episode 11
1	Jeon So-mi	Jeon So-mi	Jeon So-mi	Kim Se-jeong (▲1)	Kim Se-jeong	Kim Se-jeong	Jeon So-mi (▲4)	Jeon So-mi
2	Kim Se-jeong	Kim Se-jeong	Kim Se-jeong	Jeon So-mi (▼1)	Choi Yoo-jung (▲1)	Choi Yoo-jung	Kim Se-jeong (▼1)	Kim Se-jeong
3	Zhou Jieqiong	Kang Mi-na (▲5)	Kang Mi-na	Choi Yoo-jung (▲5)	Kang Mi-na (▲2)	Kang Mi-na	Choi Yoo-jung (▼1)	Choi Yoo-jung
4	Jung Chae-yeon	Zhou Jieqiong (▼1)	Kim Dani (▲2)	Zhou Jieqiong (▲2)	Jeon So-mi (▼2)	Jeon So-mi	Kim So-hye (▲4)	Kim Chung-ha (▲1)
5	Jung Eun-woo	Kim Na-young (▲4)	Ki Hui-hyeon (▲1)	Kang Mi-na (▼2)	Kim Na-young (▲4)	Kim Na-young	Kim Chung-ha (▲8)	Kim So-hye (▼1)
6	Ki Hui-hyeon	Kim Dani (▲1)	Zhou Jieqiong (▼3)	Ki Hui-hyeon (▼1)	Zhou Jieqiong (▼2)	Zhou Jieqiong	Kim So-hee (▲16)	Zhou Jieqiong (▲13)
7	Kim Dani	Huh Chan-mi (▲9)	Kim Na-young (▼2)	Kim Dani (▼3)	Kim So-hye (▲4)	Kim Do-yeon (▲1)	Yoon Chae-kyung (▲8)	Jung Chae-yeon (▲5)
8	Kang Mi-na	Jung Chae-yeon (▼4)	Choi Yoo-jung (▲5)	Jung Chae-yeon (▲2)	Kim Do-yeon (▲5)	Kim So-hye (▼1)	Han Hye-ri (▲8)	Kim Do-yeon (▲3)
9	Kim Na-young	Ki Hui-hyeon (▼3)	Huh Chan-mi (▼2)	Kim Na-young (▼2)	Yoo Yeon-jung (▲3)	Jung Chae-yeon (▲1)	Lim Na-young (▲2)	Kang Mi-na (▲9)
10	Kwon Eun-bin	Kwon Eun-bin	Jung Chae-yeon (▼2)	Jeon So-yeon (▲1)	Jung Chae-yeon (▼2)	Yoo Yeon-jung (▼1)	Yoo Yeon-jung	Lim Na-young (▼1)
11	Choi Yoo-jung	Jeon So-yeon (▲12)	Jeon So-yeon	Kim So-hye (▲5)	Lim Na-young (▲13)	Lim Na-young	Kim Do-yeon (▼4)	Yoo Yeon-jung (▼1)

=== First voting period ===
The first voting period took place from January 22 to February 13, 2016. Viewers were allowed to vote for eleven contestants daily.

Eliminations were based on individual total points.

1st Voting Period results
Rank	Episode 1 (Online votes)	Episode 2 (Online votes)	Episode 3 (Online votes)	Episode 4 (Live votes)		Episode 5 (Total votes)	
Rank	Episode 1 (Online votes)	Episode 2 (Online votes)	Episode 3 (Online votes)	Name	Votes	Name	Votes
1	Jeon So-mi	Jeon So-mi	Jeon So-mi	Kim Se-jeong	1,204	Kim Se-jeong	559,694
2	Kim Se-jeong	Kim Se-jeong	Kim Se-jeong	Hwang Soo-yeon	1,180	Jeon So-mi	528,772
3	Zhou Jieqiong	Kang Mi-na	Kang Mi-na	Lim Na-young	1,160	Choi Yoojung	392,773
4	Jung Chae-yeon	Zhou Jieqiong	Kim Dani	Kim Ju-na	1,137	Zhou Jieqiong	387,537
5	Jung Eun-woo	Kim Na-young	Ki Hui-hyeon	Kim Do-yeon	1,125	Kang Mi-na	376,977
6	Ki Hui-hyeon	Kim Dani	Zhou Jieqiong	Jeon So-mi	1,118	Ki Hui-hyeon	294,540
7	Kim Dani	Huh Chan-mi	Kim Na-young	Kim Min-kyeung	1,117	Kim Dani	273,930
8	Kang Mi-na	Jung Chae-yeon	Choi Yoo-jung	Kang Yae-bin	1,100	Jung Chae-yeon	251,469
9	Kim Na-young	Ki Hui-hyeon	Huh Chan-mi	Park Si-yeon	1,097	Kim Na-young	250,552
10	Kwon Eun-bin	Kwon Eun-bin	Jung Chae-yeon	Kim Si-hyeon	1,088	Jeon So-yeon	230,395
11	Choi Yoo-jung	Jeon So-yeon	Jeon So-yeon	Park Min-ji	1,087	Kim So-hye	227,670

Notes
- On Episode 4, an additional 1000 points are given to the girls of the winning teams.
- The ranking for Episode 5 is the result of combining the girls' online votes and live votes from the previous episode.

=== Second voting period ===
The second voting period took place from February 20 to March 5, 2016. Viewers were allowed to vote for eleven contestants daily.

Eliminations were based on individual total points.

2nd Voting Period results
Rank	Episode 6 (Online votes)	Episode 8 (Total votes)		
Rank	Episode 6 (Online votes)	Name	Votes	
Rank	1	Kim Se-jeong	Kim Se-jeong	1,473,687
2	Choi Yoo-jung	Choi Yoo-jung	1,286,447	
3	Kang Mi-na	Kang Mi-na	1,212,720	
4	Jeon So-mi	Jeon So-mi	1,201,490	
5	Kim Na-young	Kim Na-young	931,084	
6	Zhou Jieqiong	Zhou Jieqiong	885,556	
7	Kim So-hye	Kim Do-yeon	841,749	
8	Kim Do-yeon	Kim So-hye	833,101	
9	Yoo Yeon-jung	Jung Chae-yeon	696,808	
10	Jung Chae-yeon	Yoo Yeon-jung	684,660	
11	Lim Na-young	Lim Na-young	665,898	

Note
- The ranking for Episodes 7 and 9 were not shown due to the second and third elimination.

=== Third voting period ===
The third voting period took place from March 11 to March 19, 2016. At first, it was announced that the voting limit would be decreased from eleven to seven, and was later lowered again to five. Once voting opened, however, viewers were only allowed to select one contestant daily.

Eliminations were based on individual total points.

3rd Voting Period results
Rank	Episode 10 (Total votes)	
Rank	Name	Votes
1	Jeon So-mi	380,783
2	Kim Se-jeong	131,612
3	Choi Yoo-jung	128,004
4	Kim So-hye	93,189
5	Kim Chung-ha	89,323
6	Kim So-hee	54,538
7	Yoon Chae-kyung	53,255
8	Han Hye-ri	49,379
9	Lim Na-young	48,110
10	Yoo Yeon-jung	45,985
11	Kim Do-yeon	44,873

=== Result ===
During the last episode, which aired on April 1, 2016, presenter Jang Keun-suk announced the girl group's name: I.O.I (Korean: 아이오아이).

Final members of I.O.I
Rank	Episode 11 (Total votes)		
Rank	Name	Votes	Company
1	Jeon So-mi	858,333	JYP
2	Kim Se-jeong	525,352	Jellyfish
3	Choi Yoo-jung	438,778	Fantagio
4	Kim Chung-ha	403,633	MNH
5	Kim So-hye	229,732	RedLine
6	Zhou Jieqiong	218,338	Pledis
7	Jung Chae-yeon	215,338	MBK
8	Kim Do-yeon	200,069	Fantagio
9	Kang Mi-na	173,762	Jellyfish
10	Lim Na-young	138,726	Pledis
11	Yoo Yeon-jung	136,780	Starship

== Episodes ==
No.	Title	Original release date
1	"Episode 1"	January 22, 2016
The contestants enter the studio where 101 seats are arranged in a pyramid, with the seat for the number one trainee at the top. The trainees are grouped together by their agencies and introduced. Every contestant then gets to choose one of the seats according to which rank they expect themselves to achieve. Afterward, they are asked to perform with their group, and each individual trainee is judged by the mentors based on their overall talent and assigned a class; A being the highest and F the lowest. At the end of the episode, the first ranking is shown with JYP Entertainment's Jeon So-mi in first place.
2	"Episode 2"	January 29, 2016
After each trainee has been assigned a grade, presenter Jang Keun-suk announces that they will be performing the signal song "Pick Me" on M Countdown. The A group trainees will receive the most screen time, while the F group trainees will merely serve as backup dancers. They are informed that they will have three days to practice, after which they will be re-evaluated and re-assigned their final grades by the mentors. At the end of the episode, the girls are given their new grades and asked to move to their respective new practice rooms.
3	"Episode 3"	February 5, 2016
The girls rehearse for the "Pick Me" stage in their new groups and Fantagio's Choi Yoo-jung is chosen as the center. After the performance, the next evaluation is announced: the Group Battle. The trainees will form twenty teams and perform one out of ten girl group debut songs in front of a live audience, with two rivaling teams competing against each other with the same song. Each trainee will get voted on separately by the live audience and the members' combined scores will determine the winning group, which will receive a benefit. The live votes will also be added to their online votes before the first elimination. Then, the A group trainees compete for their preferred song through a race and are given the privilege to pick the remaining members of their teams. Once the teams are formed, the trainees are shown rehearsing for their stages. The episode ends with the "Into the New World" team's performance.
4	"Episode 4"	February 12, 2016
The second half of the performances are shown. MBK Entertainment's Kim Dani and Clear Company's Ma Eun-jin both get sick and the latter is forced to leave the show due to health concerns. After the last performance, the girls are shown their rankings based on their individual live votes and the 1,000-point benefit.Jellyfish Entertainment's Kim Se-jeong places first overall with 1204 points.
5	"Episode 5"	February 19, 2016
For this episode, Shin Bora, Heo Young-ji and Block B's Park Kyung appeared as special panelists. In between announcements of each girl's ranking during the first elimination, events leading up to the elimination are shown. Just after arriving at the dorms, the girls are taken to get flu shot. Weeks after, they were weighed and asked to do a series of exercises with the help of trainer Ray Yang. Some girls were put on a strict diet in order to lose weight. The trainees were also tricked into participating in a 'hidden camera'. The first is a consideration test to see who would be willing to help a staff struggling with two heavy packs of water bottles. The second is to see whether the participants would clean up the floor of a waiting room with coke spilling over. The third is a $30,000 camera which a staff pretends to break during a fake interview. The staff tells each trainee that she might get fired, and some girls take responsibility, pretending it was them who broke it. The 97 trainees choose the 'top visual'. Pledis Entertainment's Zhou Jieqiong takes first place while Jung Chae-yeon, Kim Do-yeon, Kim Se-jeong, Kim Ji-sung, Seo Hye-lin, Park Si-yeon, Kwon Eun-bean, Ki Heui-hyeon (Cathy), Lee Su-hyun, and Jeon So-mi takes 2nd to 11th place respectively. Jang Keun-suk then announces the top 20 trainees with Kim Se-jeong coming in 1st for the first ranking evaluation, and finally the 61st and last trainee, Happy Face Entertainment's Hwang A-young, who was saved from elimination.
6	"Episode 6"	February 26, 2016
Jang Keun-suk once again met up with the trainees to announce the next challenge. The trainees are tasked to perform live in groups based on positions they want to debut in: vocal, dance, or rap. There are six songs for vocals (Big Bang's "Monster", EXO's "Call Me Baby", Huh Gak and John Park's "My Best", GFriend's "Me Gustas Tu", Zion.T's "Yanghwa BRDG", and Tashannie's "Day by Day"), four songs for Dance (EXO's "Growl", Jessie J, Ariana Grande and Nicki Minaj's "Bang Bang", Destiny's Child's "Say My Name", and Sunmi's "Full Moon") and three songs for Rap (Verbal Jint's "You Look Happy", SMTM4's "Turtle Ship", and IKON's "Rhythm Ta"). Each song has a member limit and would be picked by each trainee based on their ranks, in which case Jellyfish Entertainment's Kim Se-jeong would have the privilege of choosing the song she wants to perform first and Happy Face Entertainment's Hwang A-young would automatically be placed in the empty slot. Jang Keun-suk also announced that only 35 trainees will remain in the next round and the winner from each category will receive 100,000 votes. The vocal teams are the first to perform and after each performance, they are ranked in their groups first and then overall in the category. Kim Se-jeong emerged as the winner in the vocal category.
7	"Episode 7"	March 4, 2016
The groups competing in the dance and rap category perform the respective songs and rehearsals for the groups are shown, with the "Bang Bang" group, composed of Choi Yoo-jung, Jeon So-mi, Kim Do-yeon, Kim Chung-ha, Kim Danielle, Kwon Eun-bean, and Kim Seo-kyung, receiving the show's first-ever encore call. Kconic Entertainment's Kim Hyeong-eun emerged the winner in the rap category, and Jellyfish Entertainment's Kang Mi-na emerged the winner in the dance category.
8	"Episode 8"	March 11, 2016
The girls are given an English lesson by trainer Lee Si-won through imitating and watching scenes of rapper Jessi on Unpretty Rapstar. Through a video recording, Jang Keun-suk then announces the beginning of the next evaluation prior to the second round of eliminations, meaning that all 61 girls that have survived so far will continue to practice for the performances, but not all of them may get to perform. The evaluation is revealed to be a concept evaluation, and the girls are given five original songs to choose from - EDM song "24 Hours" (produced by DJ Koo and Maximite, who previously produced "Pick Me"), girl crush pop song "Fingertips" (produced by Ryan Jhun), hip hop song "Don't Matter" (produced by San E), trap pop song "Yum-Yum" (produced by iDR), and girlish pop song "In the Same Place"(produced by B1A4's Jin-young) - with the winning team to receive a benefit of 150,000 votes. The girls choose their teams based on their category and individual ranking from the last evaluation. However, as only 14 people can be on one team (twice the amount that will be on the team after the elimination occurs), the first girl to have chosen a concept is given the right to kick out any extras, thus forcing them to choose another song. After practicing for the new songs, the girls undergo the second elimination, beginning with rank 34 up to 1, with Kim Se-jeong once again taking first place. Jang Keun-suk then announces the 35th and last trainee, SS Entertainment's Lee Su-hyun, who was saved from elimination.
9	"Episode 9"	March 18, 2016
Following eliminations, the teams are reorganized; groups with more than 7 members voted on whom to send to groups with less than 7 members. Jang Keun-suk announces that the evaluation will have an audience of 3000, far more than the 1000 they've had in previous evaluations. The girls resume practice, reassigning parts and meeting with the producers to record studio versions of their songs. On the day of the performances, several eliminated trainees are shown in the audience in support of the other girls. Both the "Yum-Yum" team (composed of Choi Yoo-jung, Jeon So-mi, Jung Chae-yeon, Kim Danielle, Park Si-yeon, Park So-yeon and Heo Chan-mi) and the "In the Same Place" team (composed of Kim Do-yeon, Kim So-hye, Yoo Yeon-jung, Yoon Chae-kyung, Han Hye-ri, Kim So-hee and Kang Si-ra) receive encore calls, but by a small margin of 30 audience votes, "In the Same Place" ultimately takes the win and the 150,000 vote benefit.
10	"Episode 10"	March 25, 2016
Amidst the eliminations, the girls undergo various lessons (make-up and speech), attend a therapy session to share about their current feelings, and participate in a question relay. They are also asked to pick the 5 most popular trainees amongst them, with Pledis Entertainment's Zhou Jieqiong taking 1st place and Kim Do-yeon, Jeon So-mi, Kim Chung-ha, and Lee Su-hyun taking 2nd to 5th place, respectively. At the elimination, Jang Keun-suk reveals that only 22 trainees will advance to the final stage. The girls are also shocked to discover huge differences in the rankings as a result of the new voting system and the 150,000 vote benefit from the concept evaluation, with various girls previously ranking within the top 11 falling near the bottom. With ranks 21 to 3 revealed, Kim Se-jeong and Jeon So-mi are called up as the contenders for 1st, with Jeon So-mi revealed to have won by a landslide. The contenders for 22nd place are then called up: Chorokbaem Juna's Ng Sze Kai and SS Entertainment's Lee Su-hyun. Lee Su-hyun once again barely survives being eliminated. With the top 22 confirmed, Jang Keun-suk announces the next and final mission: the debut song evaluation. He introduces "CRUSH" (produced by Ryan Jhun, who previously produced "Fingertips") as the final line-up's debut song. He explains that they will be split into two teams of 11, each team composed of one main vocal, eight sub vocals, and two rappers, with only Jeon So-mi's position as center confirmed due to having ranked 1st. The girls choose their positions beginning with rank 22 up to 1, with the higher ranked girls being given the advantage of replacing the lower ranked girls and bumping them into another position. After positions are confirmed, the girls begin practicing the choreography and memorizing the lyrics in preparation for the final stage.
11	"Episode 11"	April 1, 2016
The episode begins showing the girls' audition tapes, as well as their final confessional interviews. An announcement is then made that viewers will now be able to send SMS votes for one girl only, which will be added to the online votes in order to determine the final line-up. Throughout the episode, the trainee currently ranked 11th is revealed every now and then to encourage people to vote. The debut evaluation starts off with the eliminated trainees joining the top 22 for a performance of "PICK ME". Jang Keun-suk then reveals that the debut group, named I.O.I (아이오아이), will debut with a "unique" concept. The episode then flashes back to the guerilla concert held by the top 22 girls, where they performed their songs from the concept evaluation and eliminated trainee, Show Works' Hwang In-sun, acted as the MC. A high-five event had been held with the first 500 people that arrived at the concert, with Kim Se-jeong receiving the most high-fives. The episode cuts to the girls recording "When the Cherry Blossoms Fade" (produced by B1A4's Jin-young who previously produced "In the Same Place"), which they perform at the evaluation. The girls are then shown preparing for their debut song, during which they surprise the trainers with thank you video messages, cake, and flowers. After the performance of "CRUSH", the episode cuts to the girls interviewing one another, undergoing group photoshoots, and finally, reading letters they had written to themselves from earlier episodes. Voting soon comes to a close, and ranking announcements begin. Lim Na-young, Kang Mi-na, Kim Do-yeon, Jung Chae-yeon, Zhou Jieqiong, Kim So-hye, Kim Chung-ha, and Choi Yoo-jung are announced as 10th to 3rd place, respectively, confirming them for debut. Again, Jeon So-mi and Kim Se-jeong are called up as contenders for 1st, and again, Jeon So-mi takes the win, confirming her position as I.O.I's center. The contenders for 11th, Star Empire Entertainment's Han Hye-ri and Starship Entertainment's Yoo Yeon-jung, are then announced with Yoo Yeon-jung ultimately being revealed to be I.O.I's final member.

== Controversy ==
Controversy arose after Ilgan Sports leaked the contract terms between CJ E&M and the Produce 101 trainees' agencies to the public on February 16, 2016. According to the contract, the agencies and trainees are prohibited from legal action against manipulated edits made on the show and from revealing unreleased information. While the agencies share music production costs, trainees will not receive payment for participating in the show and CJ E&M will take half of any profits from Produce 101 music releases, with the agencies of members featured in the release sharing the remainder.

An affiliate of the show stated that "it [was] regrettable that the contents of the contract were revealed" and emphasized that the terms outlined in the contract are "legally common" and "made to protect the editorial rights of producers and to prevent any spoilers of the show."

== Discography ==
=== Extended plays ===
List of extended plays, with selected chart positions and sales
Title	Details	Peak chart positions	Sales
Title	Details	KOR	Sales
35 Girls 5 Concepts	Released: March 19, 2016; Label: Stone Music Entertainment; Formats: Digital download, streaming; Track list: 1. 24 Hours (24시간); 2. Fingertips; 3. Don't Matter; 4. Yum-Yum (얌얌); 5. In the Same Place (같은 곳에서)	—N/a	

=== Singles ===
List of singles, with selected chart positions
Title	Year	Peak chart positions	Sales	Album
Title	Year	KOR	Sales	Album
"Pick Me"	2015	9	KOR: 893,723	Non-album single
"24 Hours" (24시간)	2016	44	KOR: 204,742	35 Girls 5 Concepts
"Fingertips"	2016	21	KOR: 394,446	35 Girls 5 Concepts
"Don't Matter"	2016	30	KOR: 253,613	35 Girls 5 Concepts
"Yum-Yum" (얌얌)	2016	14	KOR: 579,478	35 Girls 5 Concepts
"In the Same Place" (같은 곳에서)	2016	8	KOR: 807,282	35 Girls 5 Concepts
"—" denotes releases that did not chart or were not released in that territory.

== Viewership ==
Average TV viewership ratings
Ep.	Original broadcast date	Average audience share		
Ep.	Original broadcast date	Nielsen Korea		TNmS
Ep.	Original broadcast date	Nationwide	Seoul	Nationwide
1	January 22, 2016	1.042% (28th)	N/A	0.50%
2	January 29, 2016	1.561% (8th)	N/A	1.10%
3	February 5, 2016	1.777% (5th)	N/A	1.50%
4	February 12, 2016	3.306% (3rd)	2.75%	3.00%
5	February 19, 2016	3.475% (3rd)	3.36%	3.60%
6	February 26, 2016	3.406% (3rd)	3.12%	3.60%
7	March 4, 2016	3.781% (3rd)	4.03%	3.40%
8	March 11, 2016	3.664% (3rd)	4.78%	3.00%
9	March 18, 2016	2.976% (3rd)	3.17%	3.10%
10	March 25, 2016	3.692% (2nd)	4.77%	4.10%
11	April 1, 2016	4.383% (1st)	4.94%	3.70%
Average		3.01%	—	2.70%
In the table below, the blue numbers represent the lowest ratings and the red numbers represent the highest ratings.; N/A denotes rating that was not released.; NR denotes that the show did not rank in the top 10 daily programs on that date.; This show aired on a cable channel/pay TV which normally has a relatively smaller audience compared to free-to-air TV/public broadcasters (KBS, SBS, MBC, and EBS).

== Vote manipulation investigation ==
In July 2019, during the final episode of the Produce 101 series' fourth season, Produce X 101, several viewers suspected that the total votes were manipulated after noticing numerical patterns. On August 1, 2019, 272 viewers filed a lawsuit against Mnet, as their on-site text voting service charged ₩100 per vote. On November 18, 2020, the court revealed that the show was manipulated within trainees in the 1st round of voting for Kim Suh-yeon and Seo Hye-Lin, who passed the 1st Elimination. Mnet had changed their ranks to eliminate them. It is not known what their true rank was supposed to be when they were eliminated.
