= List of Produce 101 contestants =

Produce 101 was a 2016 South Korean reality television show where trainees compete to debut in a girl group.

== Contestants ==
On the third episode, which aired on February 5, 2016, it was revealed that three trainees had left the show: Kim Ha-yun (101 Doors), Yim Kyung-ha (Astory Entertainment) and Lim Hyo-sun (CMG Chorok Stars). Ma Eun-jin of Clear Company join and left the show on the fourth episode for health reasons.

English names are according to the official website.

Age is shown according to Korean age system.

Color key

- Final members of I.O.I
- Eliminated in the final episode
- Eliminated in the third elimination round
- Eliminated in the second elimination round
- Eliminated in the first elimination round
- Left the show
- Top 11 for the episode

List of Produce 101 contestants
Company	Name	Age (Note: As of Episode 1 (January 22, 2016).)	Judges' evaluation		Ranking												
Company	Name	Age	Judges' evaluation		Ep. 1	Ep. 2	Ep. 3	Episode 5		Ep. 6	Episode 8		Episode 10		Episode 11		Final
Company	Name	Age	1	2	#	#	#	#	Votes	#	#	Votes	#	Votes	#	Votes	Final
Individual Trainee (개인 연습생)	Kang Si-won (강시원)	21	F	C	46	45	39	39	56,224	29	36	206,504	Eliminated				36
Individual Trainee (개인 연습생)	Kim Min-jung (김민정) (Note: Kim Se-jeong, Park So-yeon, Yim Kyung-ha, and Kim Min-jung were contestants on K-pop Star 2.)	15	D	F	29	34	43	51	39,033	39	45	127,877	Eliminated				45
Individual Trainee (개인 연습생)	Kim Seo-kyoung (김서경)	18	B	A	34	43	45	30	72,474	22	27	300,125	30	6,871	Eliminated		30
Individual Trainee (개인 연습생)	Kim Si-hyeon (김시현)	18	F	D	22	30	36	35	60,090	37	40	150,271	Eliminated				40
Individual Trainee (개인 연습생)	Seong Hye-min (성혜민)	28	D	F	39	51	53	55	33,641	25	24	329,366	28	7,129	Eliminated		28
&August Entertainment (앤어거스트)	Yoon Seo-hyung (윤서형)	22	F	D	58	25	22	29	73,558	35	37	187,021	Eliminated				37
101 DOORS	Kim Ha-yun (김하윤)	23	F	N/A	93	56	Left the show										101
2able Company (투에이블 컴퍼니)	Park Hae-young (박해영)	19	A	B	97	81	79	43	47,662	38	38	172,797	Eliminated				38
Astory Entertainment (애스토리)	Park Ga-eul (박가을)	18	B	C	87	100	75	46	41,873	51	52	103,784	Eliminated				52
Astory Entertainment (애스토리)	Yim Kyung-ha (임경하)	20	A	N/A	88	48	Left the show										100
Blessing Entertainment (블레싱)	Kim Do-hee (김도희)	20	F	F	48	68	70	81	21,485	Eliminated							81
Blessing Entertainment (블레싱)	Kim Sol-ee (김솔이)	20	F	F	98	95	96	92	19,899	Eliminated							92
Blessing Entertainment (블레싱)	Bang Joon-hee (방준희)	21	F	C	73	88	97	94	18,579	Eliminated							94
Blessing Entertainment (블레싱)	Ahn Yu-mi (안유미)	20	D	F	92	98	90	63	27,793	Eliminated							63
Blessing Entertainment (블레싱)	Oh Han-areum (오한아름)	19	F	F	66	85	92	83	21,245	Eliminated							83
Cani Star Entertainment (케니스타)	Park Ha-yi (박하이)	29	F	D	43	50	50	54	34,459	45	51	106,057	Eliminated				51
Chorokbaem Juna (초록뱀주나)	Ng Sze Kai (응 씨 카이) (Note: Ng Sze Kai was a member of the Hong Konger girl group As One under the stage name Shin.)	23	B	B	53	52	19	17	176,067	21	28	298,495	23	14,138	Eliminated		23
Chungchun Music (청춘뮤직)	Kang Si-ra (강시라) (Note: Kang Si-ra was a contestant on JTBC's Hidden Singer 3, where she impersonated Girls' Generation's Taeyeon.)	26	B	B	42	60	62	59	29,703	61	29	290,109	16	26,526	22	40,759	22
Clear Company (클리어 컴퍼니)	Ma Eun-jin (마은진) (Note: Ma Eun-jin was set to debut in the girl group Playback but withdrew due to rumors that she used to be a sasaeng.)	20	F	F	65	36	Left the show										98
CMG Chorok Stars (CMG초록별)	Lim Hyo-sun (임효선) (Note: Lim Hyo-sun was a member of Kiwi Band under the stage name Ellie and is currently a member of H.U.B.)	19	D	F	54	38	Left the show										99
Cube Entertainment (큐브엔터테인먼트)	Kwon Eun-bin (권은빈) (Note: Kwon Eun-bin was announced as a member of CLC during her time on the show and eventually debuted with the group.)	17	A	D	10	10	12	16	179,721	15	25	310,972	35	2,353	Eliminated		35
Cube Entertainment (큐브엔터테인먼트)	Lee Yoon-seo (이윤서)	15	F	B	18	21	29	38	56,821	58	59	73,702	Eliminated				59
Cube Entertainment (큐브엔터테인먼트)	Jeon So-yeon (전소연)	19	A	A	23	11	11	10	230,395	18	19	372,952	20	19,045	20	78,058	20
DSP Media (DSP 미디어)	Yoon Chae-kyung (윤채경) (Note: Yoon Chae-kyung and Cho Shi-yoon were members of Puretty and appeared in the reality show Kara Project.)	21	D	C	15	14	15	21	149,977	20	15	460,700	7	53,255	16	128,454	16
DSP Media (DSP 미디어)	Cho Shi-yoon (조시윤) (Note: Cho Shi-yoon appeared in a supporting role in the 2014 drama Seonam Girls High School Investigators.)	21	D	D	21	15	17	27	102,110	41	41	146,681	Eliminated				41
Duble Kick Company (더블킥 컴퍼니)	Huh Chan-mi (허찬미) (Note: Huh Chan-mi was a member of Coed School and F-ve Dolls.)	25	A	B	16	7	9	15	184,926	28	33	249,026	26	8,571	Eliminated		26
ECUBE Media (이큐브 미디어)	Kim Seol-a (김설아) (Note: Kim Seol-a was a contestant on Superstar K6 and MBC's Birth of a Great Star 3.)	26	D	F	91	80	86	82	21,394	Eliminated							82
Fantagio (판타지오)	Kim Do-yeon (김도연)	18	B	A	28	22	14	13	203,007	8	7	841,749	11	44,873	8	200,069	8
Fantagio (판타지오)	Lee Soo-min (이수민)	18	F	A	89	87	77	45	43,932	46	34	243,513	31	6,749	Eliminated		31
Fantagio (판타지오)	Jung Hae-rim (정해림)	19	C	C	47	57	54	44	43,960	44	47	119,148	Eliminated				47
Fantagio (판타지오)	Choi Yoo-jung (최유정)	18	D	A	11	13	8	3	392,773	2	2	1,286,447	3	128,004	3	438,778	3
Fantagio (판타지오)	Chu Ye-jin (추예진)	16	F	F	36	37	42	50	41,048	47	46	126,296	Eliminated				46
FM Entertainment (FM 엔터테인먼트)	Yun Yu-dam (윤유담)	20	B	D	79	99	76	95	18,206	Eliminated							95
Happy Face Entertainment (해피페이스)	Kim Shi-hyun (김시현)	18	F	B	57	71	69	64	27,656	Eliminated							64
Happy Face Entertainment (해피페이스)	Kim Woo-jung (김우정)	25	B	C	67	90	82	74	23,795	Eliminated							74
Happy Face Entertainment (해피페이스)	Kim Ja-yeon (김자연)	26	F	D	99	97	84	86	20,932	Eliminated							86
Happy Face Entertainment (해피페이스)	Kim Ji-sung (김지성)	21	D	B	77	84	66	68	26,566	Eliminated							68
Happy Face Entertainment (해피페이스)	Kim Hong-eun (김홍은)	18	C	F	80	91	80	80	21,598	Eliminated							80
Happy Face Entertainment (해피페이스)	Lee Su-hyeon (이수현)	21	D	B	71	89	94	79	21,762	Eliminated							79
Happy Face Entertainment (해피페이스)	Hwang Soo-yeon (황수연)	25	B	C	69	63	56	56	30,858	36	39	158,248	Eliminated				39
Happy Face Entertainment (해피페이스)	Hwang A-young (황아영)	22	D	D	81	70	64	61	28,223	53	56	89,095	Eliminated				56
Hello Music Entertainment (안녕뮤직)	Kim Da-jeong (김다정)	22	D	C	45	61	59	62	28,000	Eliminated							62
Jellyfish Entertainment (젤리피쉬)	Kang Mi-na (강미나)	18	A	A	8	3	3	5	376,977	3	3	1,212,720	18	21,646	9	173,762	9
Jellyfish Entertainment (젤리피쉬)	Kim Na-young (김나영)	22	A	A	9	5	7	9	250,552	5	5	931,084	15	28,167	14	133,247	14
Jellyfish Entertainment (젤리피쉬)	Kim Se-jeong (김세정)	21	A	A	2	2	2	1	559,694	1	1	1,473,685	2	131,612	2	525,352	2
JYP Entertainment (JYP 엔터테인먼트)	Jeon So-mi (전소미) (Note: Jeon So-mi was a contestant on JYP Entertainment and Mnet's Sixteen.)	16	A	B	1	1	1	2	528,772	4	4	1,201,490	1	380,783	1	858,333	1
Kconic Entertainment (케이코닉 엔터테인먼트)	Kim Min-ji (김민지) (Note: Kim Min-ji was a member of Scarlet under the stage name Kimi. She was also a Leader'S member under the stage name Habin.)	24	D	F	44	44	38	34	63,132	43	44	133,093	Eliminated				44
Kconic Entertainment (케이코닉 엔터테인먼트)	Kim Hyeong-eun (김형은)	23	C	B	35	49	41	37	59,191	32	23	332,712	33	4,538	Eliminated		33
Kconic Entertainment (케이코닉 엔터테인먼트)	Park Se-hee (박세희) (Note: Park Se-hee is the sister of Topp Dogg's P-Goon.)	24	C	F	60	58	48	49	41,203	52	43	133,442	Eliminated				43
Kconic Entertainment (케이코닉 엔터테인먼트)	Lee Jin-hee (이진희) (Note: Lee Jin-hee is the cousin of K-pop Star 4 runner-up Lee Jin-ah.)	26	D	F	83	65	46	47	41,286	54	54	99,712	Eliminated				54
LOEN Entertainment (로엔)	Park So-yeon (박소연)	18	A	A	30	26	21	20	156,148	26	30	289,217	17	23,575	18	100,001	18
LOUDers Entertainment (라우더스 엔터테인먼트)	Kim Bo-seon (김보선) (Note: Kim Bo-seon was a member of A.N.D.S.)	23	D	D	84	79	83	96	18,034	Eliminated							96
LOUDers Entertainment (라우더스 엔터테인먼트)	Lee Seo-jeong (이서정)	17	F	D	100	96	95	85	21,018	Eliminated							85
LOUDers Entertainment (라우더스 엔터테인먼트)	Hwang Se-young (황세영)	23	C	D	78	59	57	67	26,981	Eliminated							67
MNH Entertainment (M&H 엔터테인먼트)	Kim Chung-ha (김청하)	21	A	A	37	39	23	14	193,820	13	13	462,668	5	89,323	4	403,633	4
MNH Entertainment (M&H 엔터테인먼트)	Oh Seo-jung (오서정) (Note: Oh Seo-jung was a contestant on Superstar K4.)	22	B	A	51	42	31	41	51,381	49	49	117,986	Eliminated				49
M2 Project	Pyun Kang-yoon (편강윤) (Note: Pyun Kang-yoon was one of the original members of Blady.)	25	F	F	95	75	68	78	21,908	Eliminated							78
Magic Fresh Company (매직프레쉬 컴퍼니)	Nam Su-jin (남수진)	22	C	C	82	76	81	91	20,189	Eliminated							91
Magic Fresh Company (매직프레쉬 컴퍼니)	Park Min-ji (박민지)	18	B	A	70	82	85	71	24,772	Eliminated							71
MAJESTY	Shiori Niwa (니와 시오리)	23	D	B	68	69	71	77	23,045	Eliminated							77
MAJESTY	An Ye-seul (안예슬) (Note: An Ye-seul was a contestant on Superstar K4.)	22	B	B	38	41	30	25	106,322	34	26	301,814	32	6,046	Eliminated		32
MBK Entertainment (MBK 엔터테인먼트)	Ki Hui-hyeon (기희현) (Note: Ki Hui-hyeon (under the stage name Cathy) and Jung Chae-yeon are members of DIA.)	23	C	A	6	9	5	6	294,540	12	12	481,070	13	35,118	19	98,849	19
MBK Entertainment (MBK 엔터테인먼트)	Kim Dani (김다니) (Note: Kim Dani was the youngest member of T-ara and was supposed to debut with T-ara N4 but never did.)	18	B	A	7	6	4	7	273,930	14	18	419,427	24	12,581	Eliminated		24
MBK Entertainment (MBK 엔터테인먼트)	Jung Chae-yeon (정채연)	20	C	C	4	8	10	8	251,469	10	9	696,808	12	43,820	7	215,338	7
Midas Entertainment (마이다스 엔터테인먼트)	Kim Yeon-kyeong (김연경)	21	B	C	75	83	88	52	38,506	60	58	74,668	Eliminated				58
Midas Entertainment (마이다스 엔터테인먼트)	Shin Hye-hyeon (신혜현)	18	F	C	85	86	93	90	20,752	Eliminated							90
Midas Entertainment (마이다스 엔터테인먼트)	Lee Chae-lin (이채린)	18	D	D	74	93	91	87	20,868	Eliminated							87
Midas Entertainment (마이다스 엔터테인먼트)	Choi Yu-bin (최유빈)	18	C	D	56	67	74	88	20,829	Eliminated							88
Midas Entertainment (마이다스 엔터테인먼트)	Katherine Lee (캐서린 리)	16	D	F	72	73	73	89	20,807	Eliminated							89
Midas Entertainment (마이다스 엔터테인먼트)	Han Ji-yeon (한지연)	22	D	F	55	55	58	76	23,566	Eliminated							76
MJ Entertainment (MJ 엔터테인먼트)	Kim Mi-so (김미소)	17	D	C	52	74	63	73	24,114	Eliminated							73
MJ Entertainment (MJ 엔터테인먼트)	Yu Su-a (유수아)	20	A	D	64	78	65	57	30,609	48	53	100,141	Eliminated				53
MJ Entertainment (MJ 엔터테인먼트)	Heo Sa-em (허샘)	24	C	F	61	66	67	75	23,722	Eliminated							75
Music K Entertainment (뮤직케이 엔터테인먼트)	Kim Ju-na (김주나) (Note: Kim Ju-na is the half-sister of actor Kim Soo-hyun.)	23	C	F	76	24	20	19	161,825	24	21	371,978	34	3,450	Eliminated		34
Music Works (뮤직웍스)	Kim So-hee (김소희)	22	C	C	13	17	24	23	109,501	30	22	363,818	6	54,538	15	128,527	15
Mystic Entertainment (미스틱)	Kim Su-hyun (김수현)	17	C	D	41	47	47	69	26,139	Eliminated							69
Next Level Entertainment (넥스트레벨 엔터테인먼트)	Lee Se-heun (이세흔)	18	B	C	86	92	89	93	18,731	Eliminated							93
Nextar Entertainment (넥스타)	Moon Hyun-ju (문현주)	19	F	F	59	101	87	97	16,736	Eliminated							97
Nextar Entertainment (넥스타)	Choi Eun-bin (최은빈) (Note: Choi Eun-bin appeared as a rapper on the T-ara song "First Love" for Nextar Entertainment's "Cho Young-soo All-Star Signature Project". She was credited under the stage name EB.)	24	C	C	90	77	72	70	25,659	Eliminated							70
NH Media (NH미디어)	Hwang Ri-yu (황리유)	19	F	F	96	64	61	66	27,042	Eliminated							66
Pledis Entertainment (플레디스 엔터테인먼트)	Gang Gyeong-won (강경원)	20	C	D	49	40	37	31	71,200	42	48	118,171	Eliminated				48
Pledis Entertainment (플레디스 엔터테인먼트)	Kang Yae-bin (강예빈)	19	A	A	20	20	26	28	88,277	27	32	250,556	29	6,879	Eliminated		29
Pledis Entertainment (플레디스 엔터테인먼트)	Kim Min-kyeung (김민경)	20	F	B	26	29	32	42	50,652	40	42	141,623	Eliminated				42
Pledis Entertainment (플레디스 엔터테인먼트)	Park Si-yeon (박시연)	17	B	B	27	33	40	26	105,963	17	20	372,295	25	11,009	Eliminated		25
Pledis Entertainment (플레디스 엔터테인먼트)	Lim Na-young (임나영)	22	B	A	32	31	33	24	107,785	11	11	665,898	9	48,110	10	138,726	10
Pledis Entertainment (플레디스 엔터테인먼트)	Jung Eun-woo (정은우) (Note: Jung Eun-woo was a contestant on Superstar K4 and The Voice Kids.)	19	D	B	5	12	13	18	175,904	16	17	438,879	21	14,986	21	42,461	21
Pledis Entertainment (플레디스 엔터테인먼트)	Zhou Jieqiong (주결경)	19	A	A	3	4	6	4	387,537	6	6	885,556	19	19,252	6	218,338	6
RedLine Entertainment (레드라인 엔터테인먼트)	Kim So-hye (김소혜) (Note: Kim So-hye appeared in the music videos for The Ark's "The Light" and Jinlin Wang's "Goodbye School". She also made a cameo appearance in the 2015 South Korean web drama Flatterer on Naver TV Cast.)	18	F	F	24	18	16	11	227,670	7	8	833,101	4	94,189	5	229,732	5
Show Works (쇼웍스)	Hwang In-sun (황인선) (Note: Hwang In-sun was a member of Smile.G.)	30	D	C	50	28	28	36	59,736	31	31	256,387	27	8,114	Eliminated		27
SS Entertainment (SS 엔터테인먼트)	Seo Hye-lin (서혜린)	22	F	D	25	32	44	65	27,333	Eliminated							65
SS Entertainment (SS 엔터테인먼트)	Lee Su-hyun (이수현)	21	D	A	14	23	25	32	65,610	33	35	228,806	22	14,613	13	133,900	13
SS Entertainment (SS 엔터테인먼트)	Lee Hae-in (이해인)	23	C	A	19	27	34	40	52,494	19	14	461,050	14	31,059	17	116,566	17
Star Empire Entertainment (스타제국)	Kang Si-hyeon (강시현)	19	C	F	33	53	52	60	29,124	59	61	65,368	Eliminated				61
Star Empire Entertainment (스타제국)	Kim Yun-ji (김윤지)	21	C	B	94	94	78	84	21,206	Eliminated							84
Star Empire Entertainment (스타제국)	Han Hye-ri (한혜리)	20	C	D	12	16	18	22	125,095	23	16	450,768	8	49,379	12	134,128	12
Star Planet Co. (스타플레닛)	Ham Ye-ji (함예지) (Note: Ham Ye-ji was a member of Blady.)	23	D	F	101	62	60	72	24,485	Eliminated							72
Starship Entertainment (스타쉽)	Kim Tae-ha (김태하) (Note: Kim Tae-ha is the cousin of singer Kim Jun-su and was a contestant on Superstar K1.)	19	B	D	17	19	27	33	64,149	55	50	117,208	Eliminated				50
Starship Entertainment (스타쉽)	Shim Chae-eun (심채은)	18	C	F	40	46	51	58	30,347	57	60	72,460	Eliminated				60
Starship Entertainment (스타쉽)	Yoo Yeon-jung (유연정)	18	B	A	63	54	55	12	214,691	9	10	684,660	10	45,985	11	136,780	11
Tipping Entertainment (티핑 엔터테인먼트)	Risa Ariyoshi (리사 아리요시) / (有吉りさ)	24	F	F	62	72	49	48	41,244	50	55	95,712	Eliminated				55
YAMA&HOTCHICKS Entertainment (야마앤핫칙스)	Lim Jung-min (임정민)	17	B	B	31	35	35	53	36,760	56	57	88,074	Eliminated				57

== Group Battle (Episodes 3–4) ==
In the group battle evaluation, trainees from various agencies will compete against other groups in groups of five.

Color key

- Winning team
- Leader
- Center
- Leader and center

Group Battle results
Performance			Team		Contestants				
#	Artist	Song	#	Votes	Position	Name	Votes	Votes with bonus	Rank
1	Apink	"I Don't Know" (몰라요)	1	235	Main Vocal	Hwang A-young	28	28	81
1	Apink	"I Don't Know" (몰라요)	1	235	Vocal 1	Zhou Jieqiong	98	98	50
1	Apink	"I Don't Know" (몰라요)	1	235	Vocal 2	Seo Hye-lin	28	28	81
1	Apink	"I Don't Know" (몰라요)	1	235	Vocal 3	Jung Hae-rim	36	36	69
1	Apink	"I Don't Know" (몰라요)	1	235	Vocal 4	Kwon Eun-bin	45	45	61
1	Apink	"I Don't Know" (몰라요)	2	267	Main Vocal	Park Si-yeon	97	1097	9
1	Apink	"I Don't Know" (몰라요)	2	267	Vocal 1	Kim Su-hyun	61	1061	22
1	Apink	"I Don't Know" (몰라요)	2	267	Vocal 2	Kim Tae-ha	14	1014	48
1	Apink	"I Don't Know" (몰라요)	2	267	Vocal 3	Kang Mi-na	55	1055	26
1	Apink	"I Don't Know" (몰라요)	2	267	Vocal 4	Lee Su-hyeon	40	1040	29
2	Sistar	"Push Push" (푸시푸시)	1	218	Main Vocal	An Ye-seul	37	1037	31
2	Sistar	"Push Push" (푸시푸시)	1	218	Vocal 1	Kim So-hee	69	1069	16
2	Sistar	"Push Push" (푸시푸시)	1	218	Vocal 2	Kim Seol-a	21	1021	43
2	Sistar	"Push Push" (푸시푸시)	1	218	Rapper 1	Lee Chae-lin	19	1019	46
2	Sistar	"Push Push" (푸시푸시)	1	218	Rapper 2	Jeon So-yeon	72	1072	15
2	Sistar	"Push Push" (푸시푸시)	2	184	Main Vocal	Kang Si-ra	22	22	88
2	Sistar	"Push Push" (푸시푸시)	2	184	Vocal 1	Nam Su-jin	26	26	84
2	Sistar	"Push Push" (푸시푸시)	2	184	Vocal 2	Kim Chung-ha	36	36	69
2	Sistar	"Push Push" (푸시푸시)	2	184	Rapper 1	Ng Sze Kai	56	56	56
2	Sistar	"Push Push" (푸시푸시)	2	184	Rapper 2	Ahn Yu-mi	44	44	63
3	2NE1	"Fire"	1	138	Main vocal	Kim Yeon-kyeong	31	31	77
3	2NE1	"Fire"	1	138	Vocal 1	Heo Sa-em	20	20	90
3	2NE1	"Fire"	1	138	Vocal 2	Kim Shi-hyun	45	45	61
3	2NE1	"Fire"	1	138	Vocal 3	Shiori Niwa	9	9	97
3	2NE1	"Fire"	1	138	Rapper	Lee Soo-min	33	33	74
3	2NE1	"Fire"	2	397	Main Vocal	Kim Ju-na	137	1137	4
3	2NE1	"Fire"	2	397	Vocal 1	Kim Min-ji	66	1066	20
3	2NE1	"Fire"	2	397	Vocal 2	Kim Si-hyeon	88	1088	10
3	2NE1	"Fire"	2	397	Vocal 3	Park Ga-eul	32	1032	35
3	2NE1	"Fire"	2	397	Rapper	Park So-yeon	74	1074	13
4	Girls' Generation	"Into the New World" (다시 만난 세계)	1	158	Main Vocal	Yoo Yeon-jung	67	67	55
4	Girls' Generation	"Into the New World" (다시 만난 세계)	1	158	Vocal 1	Park Hae-young	26	26	84
4	Girls' Generation	"Into the New World" (다시 만난 세계)	1	158	Vocal 2	Yoon Chae-kyung	30	30	79
4	Girls' Generation	"Into the New World" (다시 만난 세계)	1	158	Vocal 3	Cho Shi-yoon	16	16	94
4	Girls' Generation	"Into the New World" (다시 만난 세계)	1	158	Vocal 4	Gang Gyeong-won	19	19	91
4	Girls' Generation	"Into the New World" (다시 만난 세계)	2	259	Main Vocal	Huh Chan-mi	36	1036	32
4	Girls' Generation	"Into the New World" (다시 만난 세계)	2	259	Vocal 1	Ki Hui-hyeon	28	1028	39
4	Girls' Generation	"Into the New World" (다시 만난 세계)	2	259	Vocal 2	Jeon So-mi	118	1118	6
4	Girls' Generation	"Into the New World" (다시 만난 세계)	2	259	Vocal 3	Jung Chae-yeon	43	1043	27
4	Girls' Generation	"Into the New World" (다시 만난 세계)	2	259	Vocal 4	Jung Eun-woo	34	1034	34
5	4Minute	"Hot Issue"	1	372	Main Rapper	Hwang Soo-yeon	180	1180	2
5	4Minute	"Hot Issue"	1	372	Rapper 1	Yu Su-a	26	1026	40
5	4Minute	"Hot Issue"	1	372	Rapper 2	Han Hye-ri	69	1069	16
5	4Minute	"Hot Issue"	1	372	Vocal 1	Lee Su-hyun	68	1068	18
5	4Minute	"Hot Issue"	1	372	Vocal 2	Kim Hong-eun	29	1029	38
5	4Minute	"Hot Issue"	2	221	Main Rapper	Kim Bo-seon	31	31	77
5	4Minute	"Hot Issue"	2	221	Rapper 1	Chu Ye-jin	33	33	74
5	4Minute	"Hot Issue"	2	221	Rapper 2	Choi Yoo-jung	101	101	49
5	4Minute	"Hot Issue"	2	221	Vocal 1	Kim Mi-so	13	13	96
5	4Minute	"Hot Issue"	2	221	Vocal 2	Lee Yoon-seo	43	43	64
6	After School	"AH"	1	257	Main Vocal	Kim Ja-yeon	23	1023	42
6	After School	"AH"	1	257	Vocal 1	Kang Si-won	58	1058	24
6	After School	"AH"	1	257	Vocal 2	Lim Na-young	160	1160	3
6	After School	"AH"	1	257	Rapper	Hwang Ri-yu	16	1016	47
6	After School	"AH"	2	173	Main Vocal	Shin Hye-hyeon	27	27	83
6	After School	"AH"	2	173	Vocal 1	Kim Seo-kyoung	50	50	59
6	After School	"AH"	2	173	Vocal 2	Risa Ariyoshi	42	42	66
6	After School	"AH"	2	173	Rapper	Kim Do-hee	54	54	57
7	Miss A	"Bad Girl Good Girl"	1	209	Main Vocal	Oh Seo-jung	19	19	91
7	Miss A	"Bad Girl Good Girl"	1	209	Vocal 1	Choi Eun-bin	48	48	60
7	Miss A	"Bad Girl Good Girl"	1	209	Vocal 2	Kim Hyeong-eun	89	89	51
7	Miss A	"Bad Girl Good Girl"	1	209	Vocal 3	Lim Jung-min	34	34	72
7	Miss A	"Bad Girl Good Girl"	1	209	Vocal 4	Lee Se-heun	19	19	91
7	Miss A	"Bad Girl Good Girl"	2	426	Main Vocal	Kim Min-kyeung	117	1117	7
7	Miss A	"Bad Girl Good Girl"	2	426	Vocal 1	Kim Woo-jung	73	1073	14
7	Miss A	"Bad Girl Good Girl"	2	426	Vocal 2	Kim Da-jeong	56	1056	25
7	Miss A	"Bad Girl Good Girl"	2	426	Vocal 3	Kim Ji-sung	80	1080	12
7	Miss A	"Bad Girl Good Girl"	2	426	Vocal 4	Kang Yae-bin	100	1100	8
8	Kara	"Break It"	1	210	Main Vocal	Kim Na-young	82	82	53
8	Kara	"Break It"	1	210	Vocal 1	Bang Joon-hee	25	25	86
8	Kara	"Break It"	1	210	Vocal 2	Oh Han-areum	16	16	94
8	Kara	"Break It"	1	210	Vocal 3	Yun Yu-dam	36	36	69
8	Kara	"Break It"	1	210	Vocal 4	Yoon Seo-hyung	51	51	58
8	Kara	"Break It"	2	211	Main Vocal	Park Min-ji	87	1087	11
8	Kara	"Break It"	2	211	Vocal 1	Hwang In-sun	38	1038	30
8	Kara	"Break It"	2	211	Vocal 2	Han Ji-yeon	41	1041	28
8	Kara	"Break It"	2	211	Vocal 3	Kim Sol-ee	24	1024	41
8	Kara	"Break It"	2	211	Vocal 4	Pyun Kang-yoon	21	1021	43
10	f(x)	"LA chA TA" (라차타)	1	240	Main Vocal	Hwang Se-young	39	39	67
10	f(x)	"LA chA TA" (라차타)	1	240	Vocal 1	Lee Jin-hee	43	43	64
10	f(x)	"LA chA TA" (라차타)	1	240	Vocal 2	Kim Dani	87	87	52
10	f(x)	"LA chA TA" (라차타)	1	240	Vocal 3	Kim Min-jung	37	37	68
10	f(x)	"LA chA TA" (라차타)	1	240	Rapper	Park Se-hee	34	34	72
10	f(x)	"LA chA TA" (라차타)	2	314	Main Vocal	Ma Eun-jin			
10	f(x)	"LA chA TA" (라차타)	2	314	Vocal 1	Kim Do-yeon	125	1125	5
10	f(x)	"LA chA TA" (라차타)	2	314	Vocal 2	Seong Hye-min	68	1068	18
10	f(x)	"LA chA TA" (라차타)	2	314	Vocal 3	Kim Yun-ji	59	1059	23
10	f(x)	"LA chA TA" (라차타)	2	314	Rapper	Shim Chae-eun	62	1062	21
10	Wonder Girls	"Irony"	1	323	Main Vocal	Kim Se-jeong	204	1204	1
10	Wonder Girls	"Irony"	1	323	Vocal 1	Kim So-hye	32	1032	35
10	Wonder Girls	"Irony"	1	323	Vocal 2	Choi Yu-bin	21	1021	43
10	Wonder Girls	"Irony"	1	323	Rapper 1	Ham Ye-ji	30	1030	37
10	Wonder Girls	"Irony"	1	323	Rapper 2	Park Ha-yi	36	1036	32
10	Wonder Girls	"Irony"	2	183	Main Vocal	Lee Hae-in	77	77	54
10	Wonder Girls	"Irony"	2	183	Vocal 1	Kang Si-hyeon	32	32	76
10	Wonder Girls	"Irony"	2	183	Vocal 2	Moon Hyun-ju	22	22	88
10	Wonder Girls	"Irony"	2	183	Rapper 1	Katherine Lee	29	29	80
10	Wonder Girls	"Irony"	2	183	Rapper 2	Lee Seo-jeong	23	23	87

== Position Evaluation (Episodes 6–7) ==
Position evaluation is to show one's specialty, that is, one's position in a girl group, among three things: vocal, dance, and rap.

Color key

- Winning team
- Leader
- Center
- Leader and center

Position Evaluation results
Performance			Name	Ranking				
#	Artist	Song	Name	Team	Votes	Vocal	Dance	Rap
Vocal
1	Big Bang	"Monster"	Huh Chan-mi	2	149	12		
1	Big Bang	"Monster"	Gang Gyeong-won	5	78	23		
1	Big Bang	"Monster"	Lee Su-hyun	4	127	16		
1	Big Bang	"Monster"	Kim Min-kyeung	3	144	13		
1	Big Bang	"Monster"	Lee Soo-min	1	164	9		
1	Big Bang	"Monster"	Lee Jin-hee	6	36	27		
2	Tashannie	"Day By Day"	Kim Ju-na	2	187	8		
2	Tashannie	"Day By Day"	Yoo Yeon-jung	1	317	3		
2	Tashannie	"Day By Day"	Cho Shi-yoon	6	23	29		
2	Tashannie	"Day By Day"	Yoon Seo-hyeung	5	34	28		
2	Tashannie	"Day By Day"	Risa Ariyoshi	4	45	26		
2	Tashannie	"Day By Day"	Chu Ye-jin	3	84	21		
3	Exo	"Call Me Baby"	Jung Eun-woo	2	288	5		
3	Exo	"Call Me Baby"	Kim So-hee	3	189	6		
3	Exo	"Call Me Baby"	An Ye-seul	1	292	4		
4	GFriend	"Me Gustas Tu"	Kim Tae-ha	5	81	22		
4	GFriend	"Me Gustas Tu"	Han Hye-ri	2	164	9		
4	GFriend	"Me Gustas Tu"	Park Si-yeon	1	189	6		
4	GFriend	"Me Gustas Tu"	Lee Hae-in	3	162	11		
4	GFriend	"Me Gustas Tu"	Jung Hae-rim	4	90	19		
5	John Park with Huh Gak	"My Best"	Kang Si-ra	1	337	2		
5	John Park with Huh Gak	"My Best"	Hwang In-sun	3	131	15		
5	John Park with Huh Gak	"My Best"	Park Se-hee	4	100	18		
5	John Park with Huh Gak	"My Best"	Kim Yeon-kyeong	5	53	25		
5	John Park with Huh Gak	"My Best"	Seong Hye-min	2	142	14		
6	Zion.T	"Yanghwa Bridge"	Kim Se-jeong	1	406	1		
6	Zion.T	"Yanghwa Bridge"	Kim Na-young	2	104	17		
6	Zion.T	"Yanghwa Bridge"	Yoon Chae-kyoung	3	90	19		
6	Zion.T	"Yanghwa Bridge"	Oh Seo-jung	4	67	24		
Dance
8	Exo	"Growl"	Park So-yeon	1	190		6	
8	Exo	"Growl"	Park Hae-young	2	91		10	
8	Exo	"Growl"	Park Ga-eul	6	51		15	
8	Exo	"Growl"	Kim Min-jung	7	29		19	
8	Exo	"Growl"	Lim Jung-min	5	60		14	
8	Exo	"Growl"	Park Ha-yi	4	62		13	
8	Exo	"Growl"	Yu Su-a	3	84		11	
10	Sunmi	"Full Moon"	Zhou Jieqiong	2	204		3	
10	Sunmi	"Full Moon"	Jung Chae-yeon	3	139		8	
10	Sunmi	"Full Moon"	Kim So-hye	1	225		2	
12	Destiny's Child	"Say My Name"	Lim Na-young	2	192		4	
12	Destiny's Child	"Say My Name"	Kang Mi-na	1	269		1	
12	Destiny's Child	"Say My Name"	Kim Si-hyeon	4	42		17	
12	Destiny's Child	"Say My Name"	Lee Yoon-seo	5	26		20	
12	Destiny's Child	"Say My Name"	Kang Si-won	3	44		16	
13	Jessie J, Ariana Grande, Nicki Minaj	"Bang Bang"	Jeon So-mi	2	189		7	
13	Jessie J, Ariana Grande, Nicki Minaj	"Bang Bang"	Choi Yoo-jung	1	191		5	
13	Jessie J, Ariana Grande, Nicki Minaj	"Bang Bang"	Kim Dani	7	19		22	
13	Jessie J, Ariana Grande, Nicki Minaj	"Bang Bang"	Kim Do-yeon	3	101		9	
13	Jessie J, Ariana Grande, Nicki Minaj	"Bang Bang"	Kim Chung-ha	4	70		12	
13	Jessie J, Ariana Grande, Nicki Minaj	"Bang Bang"	Kwon Eun-bin	6	25		21	
13	Jessie J, Ariana Grande, Nicki Minaj	"Bang Bang"	Kim Seo-kyoung	5	41		18	
Rap
7	iKON	"Rhythm Ta"	Ki Hui-hyeon	2	233			4
7	iKON	"Rhythm Ta"	Ng Sze Kai	1	256			3
7	iKON	"Rhythm Ta"	Kang Si-hyeon	3	131			8
9	Verbal Jint	"You Look Good"	Hwang A-young	2	139			5
9	Verbal Jint	"You Look Good"	Kim Min-ji	3	129			9
9	Verbal Jint	"You Look Good"	Kim Hyeong-eun	1	318			1
11	Show Me the Money 4	"Turtle Ship"	Jeon So-yeon	1	287			2
11	Show Me the Money 4	"Turtle Ship"	Kang Yae-bin	3	134			7
11	Show Me the Money 4	"Turtle Ship"	Hwang Soo-yeon	2	139			5
11	Show Me the Money 4	"Turtle Ship"	Shim Chae-eun	4	59			10

== Concept Evaluation (Episode 9) ==
Concept evaluation will be conducted after watching a total of five teams of seven people for each song, and the winning team will have 150,000 votes.

Color key

- Winning team
- Leader
- Center
- Leader and center
- went to the final stage
- Eliminated

Concept Evaluation results
Performance				Team		Contestant	
#	Concept	Song	Production credits	Name	Votes	Position	Name
1	EDM	"24 Hours" (24시간)	Lyrics by: Midas-T; Composed by: Midas-T; Arranged by: DJ KOO, DJ Maximite	Make Some Noise	159	Main Vocal	Hwang In-sun
1	EDM	"24 Hours" (24시간)	Lyrics by: Midas-T; Composed by: Midas-T; Arranged by: DJ KOO, DJ Maximite	Make Some Noise	159	Vocal	Kang Mi-na
1	EDM	"24 Hours" (24시간)	Lyrics by: Midas-T; Composed by: Midas-T; Arranged by: DJ KOO, DJ Maximite	Make Some Noise	159	Vocal	Kim Na-young
1	EDM	"24 Hours" (24시간)	Lyrics by: Midas-T; Composed by: Midas-T; Arranged by: DJ KOO, DJ Maximite	Make Some Noise	159	Vocal	Kang Yae-bin
1	EDM	"24 Hours" (24시간)	Lyrics by: Midas-T; Composed by: Midas-T; Arranged by: DJ KOO, DJ Maximite	Make Some Noise	159	Vocal	Zhou Jieqiong
1	EDM	"24 Hours" (24시간)	Lyrics by: Midas-T; Composed by: Midas-T; Arranged by: DJ KOO, DJ Maximite	Make Some Noise	159	Vocal	Seong Hye-min
1	EDM	"24 Hours" (24시간)	Lyrics by: Midas-T; Composed by: Midas-T; Arranged by: DJ KOO, DJ Maximite	Make Some Noise	159	Vocal	Lee Soo-min
2	Girl Crush Pop	"Fingertips"	Lyrics by: Seo Ji-eun; Composed by: Ryan S. Jhun, Greg Bonnick, Hayden Chapman, Kristy Lee Peters, Melanie Joy Fontana, Michel Sebastian Maximilian Schulz; Arranged by: Ryan S. Jhun, Greg Bonnick, Hayden Chapman, Kristy Lee Peters, Melanie Joy Fontana, Michel Sebastian Maximilian Schulz	Pinkrush	288	Main Vocal	An Ye-seul
2	Girl Crush Pop	"Fingertips"	Lyrics by: Seo Ji-eun; Composed by: Ryan S. Jhun, Greg Bonnick, Hayden Chapman, Kristy Lee Peters, Melanie Joy Fontana, Michel Sebastian Maximilian Schulz; Arranged by: Ryan S. Jhun, Greg Bonnick, Hayden Chapman, Kristy Lee Peters, Melanie Joy Fontana, Michel Sebastian Maximilian Schulz	Pinkrush	288	Vocal	Kim Se-jeong
2	Girl Crush Pop	"Fingertips"	Lyrics by: Seo Ji-eun; Composed by: Ryan S. Jhun, Greg Bonnick, Hayden Chapman, Kristy Lee Peters, Melanie Joy Fontana, Michel Sebastian Maximilian Schulz; Arranged by: Ryan S. Jhun, Greg Bonnick, Hayden Chapman, Kristy Lee Peters, Melanie Joy Fontana, Michel Sebastian Maximilian Schulz	Pinkrush	288	Vocal	Kim Chung-ha
2	Girl Crush Pop	"Fingertips"	Lyrics by: Seo Ji-eun; Composed by: Ryan S. Jhun, Greg Bonnick, Hayden Chapman, Kristy Lee Peters, Melanie Joy Fontana, Michel Sebastian Maximilian Schulz; Arranged by: Ryan S. Jhun, Greg Bonnick, Hayden Chapman, Kristy Lee Peters, Melanie Joy Fontana, Michel Sebastian Maximilian Schulz	Pinkrush	288	Vocal	Ng Sze Kai
2	Girl Crush Pop	"Fingertips"	Lyrics by: Seo Ji-eun; Composed by: Ryan S. Jhun, Greg Bonnick, Hayden Chapman, Kristy Lee Peters, Melanie Joy Fontana, Michel Sebastian Maximilian Schulz; Arranged by: Ryan S. Jhun, Greg Bonnick, Hayden Chapman, Kristy Lee Peters, Melanie Joy Fontana, Michel Sebastian Maximilian Schulz	Pinkrush	288	Vocal	Jung Eun-woo
2	Girl Crush Pop	"Fingertips"	Lyrics by: Seo Ji-eun; Composed by: Ryan S. Jhun, Greg Bonnick, Hayden Chapman, Kristy Lee Peters, Melanie Joy Fontana, Michel Sebastian Maximilian Schulz; Arranged by: Ryan S. Jhun, Greg Bonnick, Hayden Chapman, Kristy Lee Peters, Melanie Joy Fontana, Michel Sebastian Maximilian Schulz	Pinkrush	288	Rapper	Ki Hui-hyeon
2	Girl Crush Pop	"Fingertips"	Lyrics by: Seo Ji-eun; Composed by: Ryan S. Jhun, Greg Bonnick, Hayden Chapman, Kristy Lee Peters, Melanie Joy Fontana, Michel Sebastian Maximilian Schulz; Arranged by: Ryan S. Jhun, Greg Bonnick, Hayden Chapman, Kristy Lee Peters, Melanie Joy Fontana, Michel Sebastian Maximilian Schulz	Pinkrush	288	Rapper	Lim Na-young
3	Hip Hop	"Don't Matter"	Lyrics by: San E, 9999; Composed by: San E, 9999; Arranged by: 9999	화려강산 (Hwaryeogangsan)	163	Main Vocal	Kim Ju-na
3	Hip Hop	"Don't Matter"	Lyrics by: San E, 9999; Composed by: San E, 9999; Arranged by: 9999	화려강산 (Hwaryeogangsan)	163	Vocal	Lee Su-hyun
3	Hip Hop	"Don't Matter"	Lyrics by: San E, 9999; Composed by: San E, 9999; Arranged by: 9999	화려강산 (Hwaryeogangsan)	163	Vocal	Kim Seo-kyoung
3	Hip Hop	"Don't Matter"	Lyrics by: San E, 9999; Composed by: San E, 9999; Arranged by: 9999	화려강산 (Hwaryeogangsan)	163	Vocal	Lee Hae-in
3	Hip Hop	"Don't Matter"	Lyrics by: San E, 9999; Composed by: San E, 9999; Arranged by: 9999	화려강산 (Hwaryeogangsan)	163	Vocal	Kwon Eun-bin
3	Hip Hop	"Don't Matter"	Lyrics by: San E, 9999; Composed by: San E, 9999; Arranged by: 9999	화려강산 (Hwaryeogangsan)	163	Vocal	Kim Hyeong-eun
3	Hip Hop	"Don't Matter"	Lyrics by: San E, 9999; Composed by: San E, 9999; Arranged by: 9999	화려강산 (Hwaryeogangsan)	163	Rapper	Jeon So-yeon
4	Trap Pop	"Yum-Yum" (얌얌)	Lyrics by: Seo Ji-eun; Composed by: DR, Ryan S. Jhun, Daniel Durn, Katrine Klith Andersen, Melanie Joy Fontana, Michel Sebastian Maximilian Schulz, SPACE ONE; Arranged by: DR, Ryan S. Jhun, Daniel Durn, Katrine Klith Andersen, Melanie Joy Fontana, Michel Sebastian Maximilian Schulz, SPACE ONE	7 go up	588	Main Vocal	Huh Chan-mi
4	Trap Pop	"Yum-Yum" (얌얌)	Lyrics by: Seo Ji-eun; Composed by: DR, Ryan S. Jhun, Daniel Durn, Katrine Klith Andersen, Melanie Joy Fontana, Michel Sebastian Maximilian Schulz, SPACE ONE; Arranged by: DR, Ryan S. Jhun, Daniel Durn, Katrine Klith Andersen, Melanie Joy Fontana, Michel Sebastian Maximilian Schulz, SPACE ONE	7 go up	588	Vocal	Park Si-yeon
4	Trap Pop	"Yum-Yum" (얌얌)	Lyrics by: Seo Ji-eun; Composed by: DR, Ryan S. Jhun, Daniel Durn, Katrine Klith Andersen, Melanie Joy Fontana, Michel Sebastian Maximilian Schulz, SPACE ONE; Arranged by: DR, Ryan S. Jhun, Daniel Durn, Katrine Klith Andersen, Melanie Joy Fontana, Michel Sebastian Maximilian Schulz, SPACE ONE	7 go up	588	Vocal	Jung Chae-yeon
4	Trap Pop	"Yum-Yum" (얌얌)	Lyrics by: Seo Ji-eun; Composed by: DR, Ryan S. Jhun, Daniel Durn, Katrine Klith Andersen, Melanie Joy Fontana, Michel Sebastian Maximilian Schulz, SPACE ONE; Arranged by: DR, Ryan S. Jhun, Daniel Durn, Katrine Klith Andersen, Melanie Joy Fontana, Michel Sebastian Maximilian Schulz, SPACE ONE	7 go up	588	Vocal	Choi Yoo-jung
4	Trap Pop	"Yum-Yum" (얌얌)	Lyrics by: Seo Ji-eun; Composed by: DR, Ryan S. Jhun, Daniel Durn, Katrine Klith Andersen, Melanie Joy Fontana, Michel Sebastian Maximilian Schulz, SPACE ONE; Arranged by: DR, Ryan S. Jhun, Daniel Durn, Katrine Klith Andersen, Melanie Joy Fontana, Michel Sebastian Maximilian Schulz, SPACE ONE	7 go up	588	Vocal	Jeon So-mi
4	Trap Pop	"Yum-Yum" (얌얌)	Lyrics by: Seo Ji-eun; Composed by: DR, Ryan S. Jhun, Daniel Durn, Katrine Klith Andersen, Melanie Joy Fontana, Michel Sebastian Maximilian Schulz, SPACE ONE; Arranged by: DR, Ryan S. Jhun, Daniel Durn, Katrine Klith Andersen, Melanie Joy Fontana, Michel Sebastian Maximilian Schulz, SPACE ONE	7 go up	588	Rapper	Park So-yeon
4	Trap Pop	"Yum-Yum" (얌얌)	Lyrics by: Seo Ji-eun; Composed by: DR, Ryan S. Jhun, Daniel Durn, Katrine Klith Andersen, Melanie Joy Fontana, Michel Sebastian Maximilian Schulz, SPACE ONE; Arranged by: DR, Ryan S. Jhun, Daniel Durn, Katrine Klith Andersen, Melanie Joy Fontana, Michel Sebastian Maximilian Schulz, SPACE ONE	7 go up	588	Rapper	Kim Dani
5	Girlish Pop	"In The Same Place" (같은 곳에서)	Lyrics by: Jinyoung (B1A4); Composed by: Jinyoung (B1A4); Arranged by: Jinyoung (B1A4), Command Freaks, Maxx Song, Ahn Seong-chan	소녀온탑 (Sonyeo Ontab)	618	Main Vocal	Yoo Yeon-jung
5	Girlish Pop	"In The Same Place" (같은 곳에서)	Lyrics by: Jinyoung (B1A4); Composed by: Jinyoung (B1A4); Arranged by: Jinyoung (B1A4), Command Freaks, Maxx Song, Ahn Seong-chan	소녀온탑 (Sonyeo Ontab)	618	Vocal	Kim Do-yeon
5	Girlish Pop	"In The Same Place" (같은 곳에서)	Lyrics by: Jinyoung (B1A4); Composed by: Jinyoung (B1A4); Arranged by: Jinyoung (B1A4), Command Freaks, Maxx Song, Ahn Seong-chan	소녀온탑 (Sonyeo Ontab)	618	Vocal	Kim So-hee
5	Girlish Pop	"In The Same Place" (같은 곳에서)	Lyrics by: Jinyoung (B1A4); Composed by: Jinyoung (B1A4); Arranged by: Jinyoung (B1A4), Command Freaks, Maxx Song, Ahn Seong-chan	소녀온탑 (Sonyeo Ontab)	618	Vocal	Kang Si-ra
5	Girlish Pop	"In The Same Place" (같은 곳에서)	Lyrics by: Jinyoung (B1A4); Composed by: Jinyoung (B1A4); Arranged by: Jinyoung (B1A4), Command Freaks, Maxx Song, Ahn Seong-chan	소녀온탑 (Sonyeo Ontab)	618	Vocal	Han Hye-ri
5	Girlish Pop	"In The Same Place" (같은 곳에서)	Lyrics by: Jinyoung (B1A4); Composed by: Jinyoung (B1A4); Arranged by: Jinyoung (B1A4), Command Freaks, Maxx Song, Ahn Seong-chan	소녀온탑 (Sonyeo Ontab)	618	Vocal	Yoon Chae-kyung
5	Girlish Pop	"In The Same Place" (같은 곳에서)	Lyrics by: Jinyoung (B1A4); Composed by: Jinyoung (B1A4); Arranged by: Jinyoung (B1A4), Command Freaks, Maxx Song, Ahn Seong-chan	소녀온탑 (Sonyeo Ontab)	618	Vocal	Kim So-hye

== Debut Evaluation (Episode 11) ==
Color key

- Center

Debut Evaluation results
Performance			Contestant	
Producer	Song	Position	Name (Team White)	Name (Team Black)
Ryan S. Jhun	"CRUSH"	Main Vocal	Kim Se-jeong	Yoo Yeon-jung
Ryan S. Jhun	"CRUSH"	Vocal 1	Jeon So-mi	Jung Eun-woo
Ryan S. Jhun	"CRUSH"	Vocal 2	Kim Chung-ha	Kim So-hee
Ryan S. Jhun	"CRUSH"	Vocal 3	Zhou Jieqiong	Jung Chae-yeon
Ryan S. Jhun	"CRUSH"	Vocal 4	Kang Si-ra	Kang Mi-na
Ryan S. Jhun	"CRUSH"	Vocal 5	Kim Na-young	Lee Hae-in
Ryan S. Jhun	"CRUSH"	Vocal 6	Choi Yoo-jung	Yun Chae-kyoung
Ryan S. Jhun	"CRUSH"	Vocal 7	Han Hye-ri	Kim Do-yeon
Ryan S. Jhun	"CRUSH"	Vocal 8	Kim So-hye	Lee Su-hyun
Ryan S. Jhun	"CRUSH"	Rapper 1	Jeon So-yeon	Ki Hui-hyeon
Ryan S. Jhun	"CRUSH"	Rapper 2	Lim Na-young	Park So-yeon
