= Sunny Wong =

Sunny Wong may refer to:

- Sunny Wong (choreographer) (born 1967), Hong Kong choreographer
- Sunny Wong (racing driver) (born 1978), Hong Kong racing driver

== See also ==
- Sunny Wang (born 1982), Taiwanese American actor and model
