= Chloe So =

Hong Kong actress, singer and model

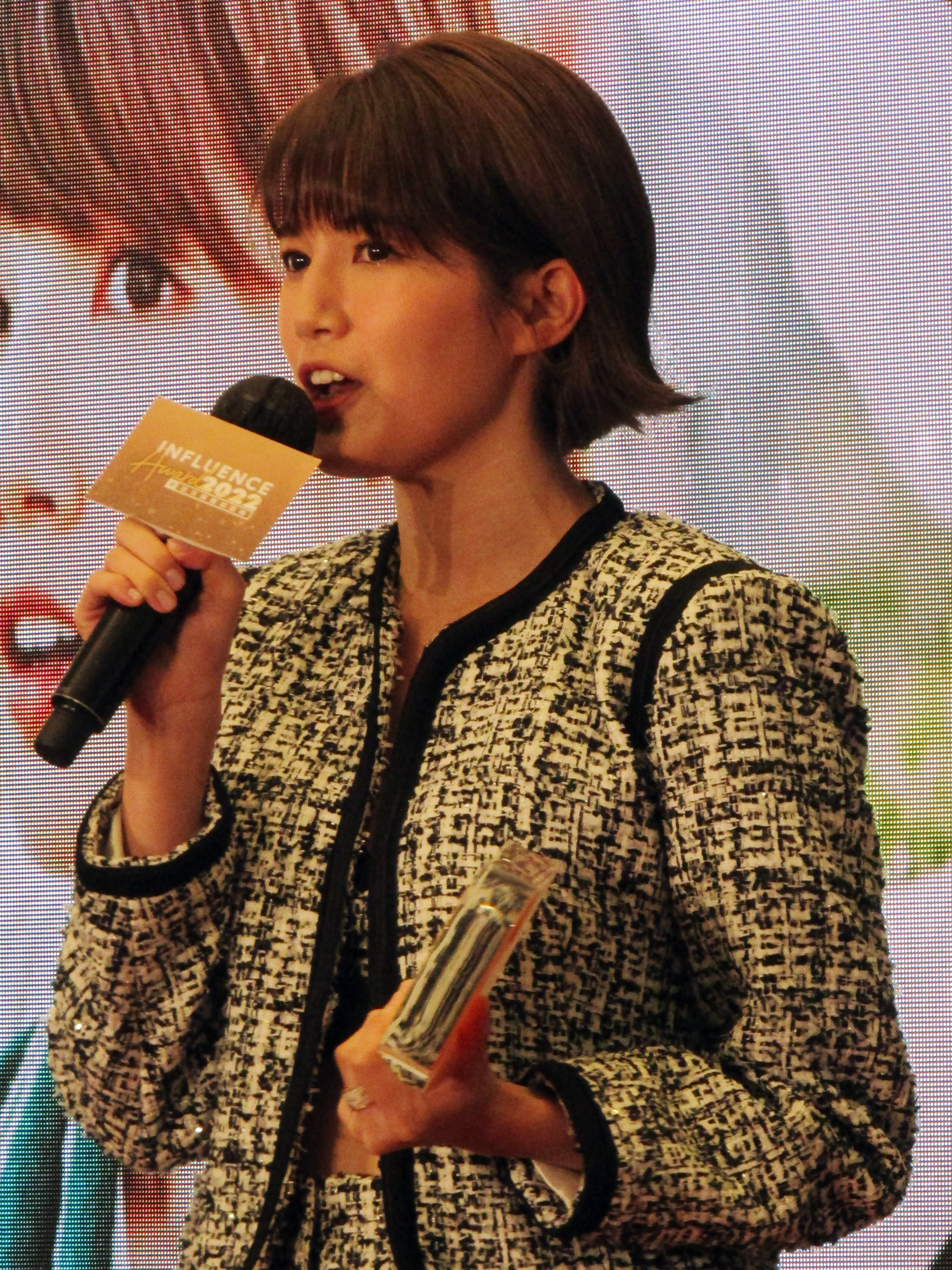
- So in 2023
- Born: So Ka Man (蘇嘉汶); April 6, 1994 (age 32); British Hong Kong
- Education: Lung Kong World Federation School Limited Lau Wong Fat Secondary School
- Occupation: Actress
- Years active: 2011–present
- Notable work: Life After Death as Keung Tsz Yau
- Relatives: 1 older brother
- Website: 蘇皓兒 CHLOE « 太陽娛樂文化有限公司

Chloe So (Chinese: 蘇皓兒, born 6 April 1994) is a Hong Kong actress, singer and model. She is an artist under the brand Sun Entertainment.

== Biography ==
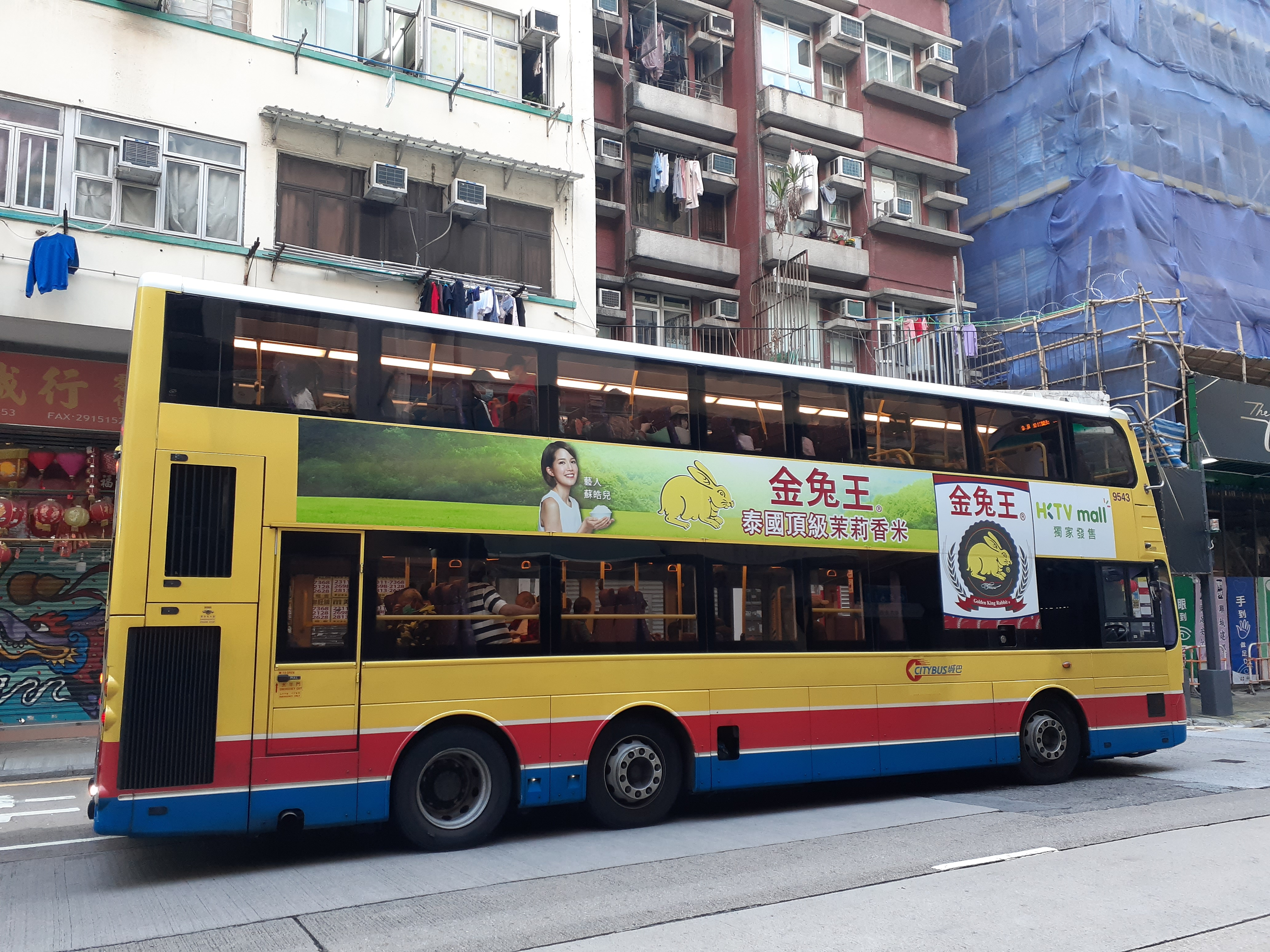
The Print Ads of Golden King Rabbit, Thailand's original thai hom Mali jasmine rice, taken in February, 2021

Chloe So grew up in Tai Kok Tsui, an older neighbourhood in Hong Kong, she had an average relation with her family. She studied in Lung Kong World Federation School Limited Lau Wong Fat Secondary School. In 2008, she participated the 12th Yes! Student Model Election, and entered the final round-of-20s. The reason of her participation in that Election is that being a model is her dream job and she hopes that she can be on photos that will be published on magazines. While she was still studying, she also became a part-time model on Magazines with her friend, Z. Koo.

In 2011, she signed a model contract with Sun Entertainment. In 2015 she signed a singer contract with Sun Entertainment, she was chosen in the talent show held in Commercial Radio Program Tricky (Chinese: 好出奇) to become a member of girl group As One along with three other members, Kayan Chan (Kayan), Yuen Ching Chan (Tania) and Ng Shi Kai (Shin) to go to Korea to get training and officially start the musical career, becoming the second vocal.

When the girl group disbanded in December 2017, she continued her work as a model while starting to become an actor. Her first work is a ViuTV drama, Margaret and David series: Ex while learning how to improve her acting with Sammy Lam, Yau Chung Wai and Kearen Pang. In Spring 2018, she was chosen in the vintage ad of a lemon tea brand, she was noticed by netizens because she look like Vivian Chow, the actor in the original ad. In 2020, she played as the protagonist's daughter, Keung Tsz Yau in TVB drama, Life After Death. Her look stands out and people noticed her. She joined Shaw Brothers that year until July 2022.

== Discography ==
- 2018: "精靈寶可夢點點名" (Pokémon HK Cartoon Theme Song)

== Filmography ==
=== Drama ===
Broadcast	Name	Character
ViuTV
2017	Backup Memory	Sister (Episode 1)
2017	Margaret and David series: Ex (Special)	Kayan (Episode 2)
Tencent Video
2019	Triggerred "Heavenly King" (Online Drama)	Yihan Qiu
TVB
2020	Life After Death	Keung Tsz-Yau
2022	Barrack O'Karma 2	
Not broadcast	OPM	Tsui Ying
hmvod
2020	A Perfect Day For Arsenide (Online Drama)	Tiffany (Unit "Flower Planting Guide")
2020	A Perfect Day For Arsenide (Online Drama)	Miko (Unit "Sunday Morning")
Viu
2024	The Divination Gossip Club	Tracy

=== Television shows ===
Year	Title	Network	Role
2023	Japan Bike Tour Let's Go Cycling	ViuTV	Host

=== Films ===
Premiere	Name	Character
2019	Beyond the Dream	Librarian
2021	Sugar St. Studio	Ying
2021	Showbiz Spy	Ha Yat Kwai
2022	Love Suddenly	Silver

=== Music video appearances ===
Year	Name	Singer
2015	"Candy Ball"	As One
2016	"Hey Ya!"	As One
2016	"捨·得"	Alex Fong
2017	"再見舊城"	3Think
2018	"Sol #4" (Song for advertisement of a Lemon Tea brand)	Dear Jane
2018	"？"	Justin Lo
2020	"原始心態"	James Ng
2020	"人馬座"	Happy Live
2020	"遠在眼前"	Jay Fung
2020	"視像見"	Oscar Tao

=== Other ===
- 2018: Arm Channel TV, The Crush in My Dream - Emilia
