= Han Hye-ri =

South Korean singer and actress (born 1997)

- 한혜리
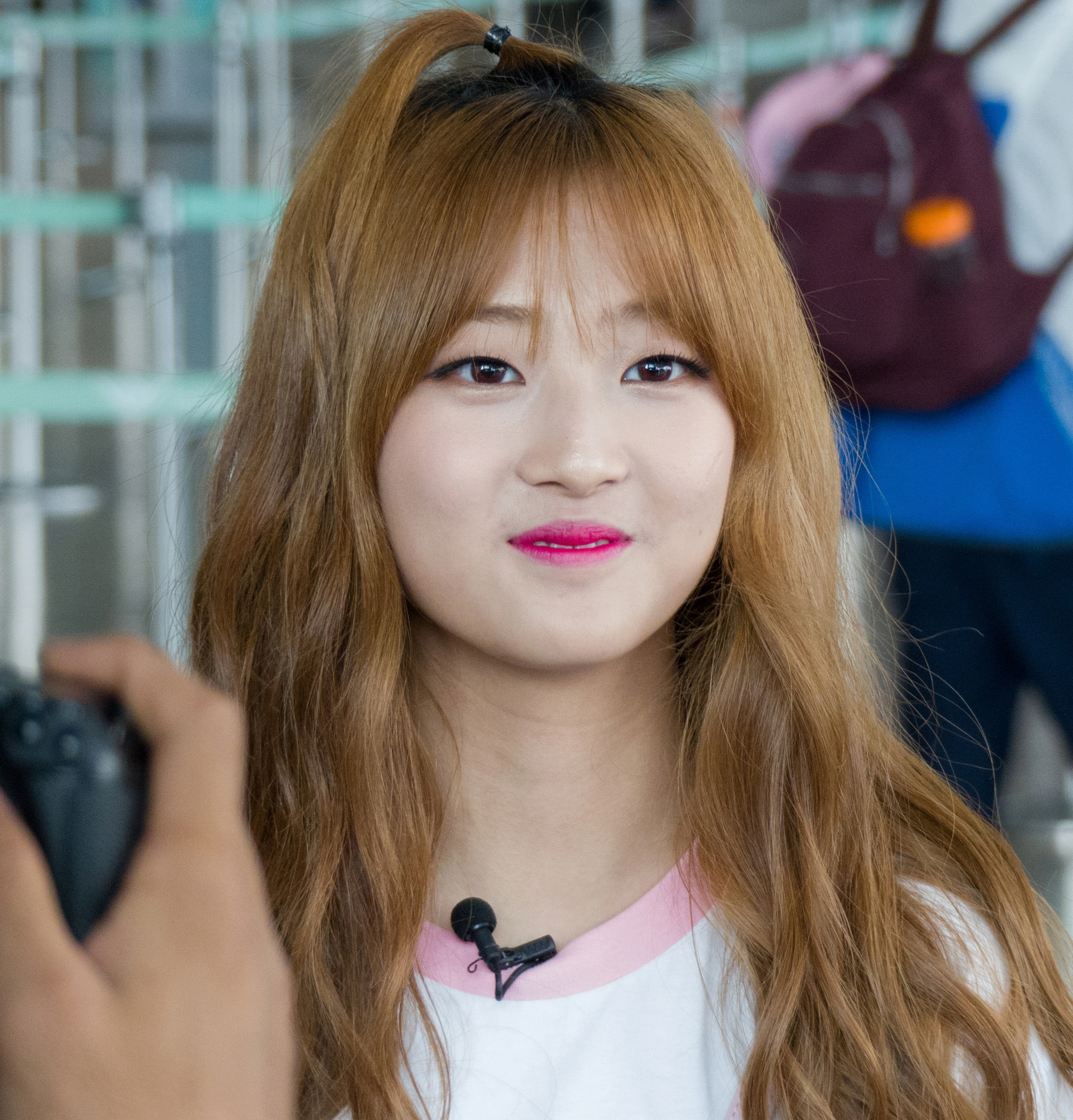
- Han at Incheon Airport in September 2016
- Born: Han Hye-ri; August 24, 1997 (age 29); Gwangmyeong, South Korea
- Education: Paekche Institute of the Arts
- Occupations: Singer; actress
- Musical career
- Genre: K-pop
- Instrument: Vocals
- Years active: 2016–present
- Labels: Star Empire; N.A
- Formerly of: I.B.I

- Han Hye-ri
- Hangul: 한혜리
- Hanja: 韓慧里
- RR: Han Hyeri
- MR: Han Hyeri

Han Hye-ri (Korean: 한혜리; born August 24, 1997) is a South Korean singer and actress. She is known as a former contestant of Produce 101 and as a member of the girl group I.B.I.

== Early life ==
Han Hye-ri was born on August 24, 1997, in Gwangmyeong, South Korea. She graduated from Sinseo High School and is currently on leave of absence from studies at Paekche Institute of the Arts.

== Career ==
=== 2016: Produce 101 and I.B.I ===
In 2016, Han represented Star Empire Entertainment on Produce 101, a show where the final 11 contestants formed the girl group I.O.I. In the final episode, she was ranked in 12th place. Despite not making the final group, she went on to receive offers to appear in several commercials and became a cosmetic spokesmodel for Delight18. In May, Star Empire Entertainment announced that she would be debuting as a member of the group OMZM.

In August 2016, she joined LOEN Entertainment's project group IBI. The group released the digital single "Molae Molae" (몰래몰래) on August 18. On August 19, I.B.I held a guerrilla concert 'Run to You' at Dongdaemun Design Plaza. On September 22, I.B.I travelled to Bangkok to film their reality show Hello I.B.I.

=== 2017: Acting debut and departure from Star Empire Entertainment ===
In 2017, Han played Yeri in the drama The Idolmaster KR. On January 3, she signed a contract as an artist with Star Empire, but she left the agency on July 25.

On December 22, 2017, she posted pictures of her modeling with MOREBME on Instagram.

== Discography ==
=== Singles ===
Year	Title	Peak chart positions	Sales	Album
Year	Title	KOR	Sales	Album
2015	"Pick Me" (as Produce 101)	9	KOR: 829,671+	Non-album single
2016	"At the Same Place" (같은 곳에서) (as Girls on Top)	8	KOR: 717,008+	35 Girls 5 Concepts
2017	"Super Girl Magic" (as Red Queen)	—	—	The IDOLM@STER.KR, Pt. 2
2017	"Acacia" (as Red Queen)	—	—	The IDOLM@STER.KR, Pt. 2
2017	"Attention" (as Red Queen)	—	—	The IDOLM@STER.KR, Pt. 2
2018	"Good Night" (as featuring artist)	—	—	Love Tape by MJ (SunnySide)

== Filmography ==
=== Television ===
==== Drama ====
Year	Title	Role
2017	The Idolmaster KR	Yeri

==== Reality ====
Year	Title	Episode(s)
2016	Produce 101	Ep. 1–11
2016	Giboutique	Ep. 5
2016	Idol Intern King	Ep. 1–20
2016	The God of Music 2	Ep. 9
2016	Lan Cable Friends I.O.I	Ep. 2
2016	Idol Cooking King	
2016	Hello I.B.I	Ep. 1–6
2017	Golden Tambourine	Ep. 6
2017	Mix Nine	Ep. 3
