= Candy Ball =

Single by As One
- Released: 3 November 2015
- Genre: Pop
- Length: 9:18
- Label: Chrok Baem Juna; CJ E&M
- Songwriters: Maybee, Iggy, Seo Young Bae

As One singles chronology
"Candy Ball" (2015)	"Hey Ya" (2016)

Music video
- "As One - 《Candy Ball》Official Music Video" on YouTube

"Candy Ball" (Korean: 캔디볼) is the first Korean digital single (sixth overall) by Hong Kong girl group As One. The digital single was released on July 13, 2015, by Chrok Baem Juna.

== History ==
The song was produced by well-known producer Iggy and Seo Youngbae.

== Promotion ==
The song made its debut performance by the group on SBS MTV's The Show on July 14, 2015.

== Track listing ==
Korean Digital
No.	Title	Lyrics	Music	Length
1.	"Candy Ball" (캔디볼)	Maybee	Iggy, Seo Young Bae	03:06
2.	"Candy Ball (Inst.)" (캔디볼 (Inst.))		Iggy, Seo Young Bae	03:06
Total length:				06:12

International Digital
No.	Title	Lyrics	Music	Length
1.	"Candy Ball (Korea Version)l" (캔디볼)	Maybee	Iggy, Seo Young Bae	03:06
2.	"Candy Ball (Cantonese Version)" (Candy Ball)	Dorcas Tsang	Iggy, Seo Young Bae	03:06
3.	"Candy Ball (Music Only)"		Iggy, Seo Young Bae	03:06
Total length:				09:18

== Chart performance ==
=== Single charts ===
'Candy Ball'

Chart (2015)	Peak position	Sales
South Korean Gaon Weekly Singles Chart	-	3,817+ (digital downloads only)
South Korean Gaon Weekly Download Chart	356	3,817+ (digital downloads only)

=== Music charts ===
Ranking On Music Charts
Album	Song	903	RTHK	997	TVB	Mnet 《M! Countdown	Others
2015
	Candy Ball	3	6	5	3	36	音樂先鋒榜：10
