= Hwang In-sun =

South Korean singer (born 1987)

- 황인선
- Born: January 31, 1987 (age 38); Seoul, South Korea
- Occupation: Singer
- Musical career
- Genres: K-pop
- Instrument: Vocals
- Years active: 2011–present
- Labels: Show Works

Korean name
- Hangul: 황인선
- RR: Hwang Inseon
- MR: Hwang Insŏn

Hwang In-sun (Korean: 황인선; born January 13, 1987) is a South Korean singer and television personality who appeared on Produce 101 and Society Game.

== Discography ==
=== Singles ===
Title	Year	Album
"DoBiDoBob" (as Smile.G)	2014	Non-album single
"Sarangae"	2015	Non-album single
"Emoticon"	2016	Non-album single
"Hwang Ya"	2017	Non-album single
"Rainbow"	2017	Non-album single
"Dead Clock (feat. Outsider)"	2018	Hwang in Sun The Ballade Part.1
"It's Mine"	2018	non-album single
"Day of Marriage" (시집가는 날) (Feat. Sujin)	2018	Day of Marriage
"Can You Hear My Song Now" (이젠 내노래가 들리나요)	2018	Hwang in Sun The Ballade Part.3
"My Love Key" (내사랑 돌쇠)	2020	non-album single
"Beotigogae"	2021	non-album single

=== Soundtrack appearances ===
Title	Year	Album
Hey, Losers (with Kim Shi Hyuk)	2018	Coffee, Do Me a Favor OST Part 7

=== Other appearances ===
Title	Year	Peak chart positions	Sales	Album
Title	Year	KOR	Sales	Album
"Pick Me" (with Produce 101 cast)	2015	9	KOR: 893,723+	Non-album single
"24 Hours" (with Make Some Noise)	2016	44	KOR: 204,742	35 Girls 5 Concepts
"Don't Give Up" (as 101)	2016			Digital Single

== Filmography ==
=== Television ===
Year	Program	Network	Roles	Notes/Ref.
2016	Produce 101	Mnet	Contestant	
2016	Plan Man	tagTV, TRENDY	Cast	ep. 7-9
2016	Society Game	tvN	Contestant	
2019	Miss Trot	TV Chosun	Contestant	
2020	King of Mask Singer	MBC	Contestant	as "Half-half Chicken" (episode 251)

=== Film ===
Year	Title	Role	Notes
2021	이번엔 잘 되겠지	주연	
