= 35 Girls 5 Concepts =

Extended play

EP by Produce 101 contestants
- Released: March 19, 2016
- Genres: K-pop; dance-pop; EDM; hip hop
- Length: 17:05
- Language: Korean
- Label: CJ E&M

35 Girls 5 Concepts is an EP by contestants of the South Korean survival show Produce 101. It was released online as a digital album on March 19, 2016 by CJ E&M.

== Background ==
Produce 101 is a South Korean survival show that aired on Mnet from January to April in 2016 where 101 female trainees from various entertainment companies competed to debut in an 11-member girl group which would promote for a year under YMC Entertainment.

On the 8th episode, the remaining trainees were given 5 new songs from 5 different producers, each a different genre. They were tasked to perform these songs live in front of an audience of 3000. The EDM song "24 Hours" was produced by DJ KOO and Maximite (Also the producers of "Pick Me"). The girl crush pop song "Fingertips" was produced by Ryan Jhun, the hip hop song "Don't Matter" was produced by San E, the trap pop song "Yum-Yum" was produced by iDR, and the girlish pop song "In the Same Place" was produced by B1A4's Jin-young, who also produced one of the songs in the finale "When the Cherry Blossoms Fade" which was eventually included in the show's product girl group, I.O.I's debut album Chrysalis.

== Commercial reception ==
All five songs on the album charted in the top 50 of the Gaon Digital Chart. "같은 곳에서 (In the Same Place)" peaked at #8, "Yum-Yum" (얌얌) at #14, "Fingertips" at #21, "Don't Matter" at #30 and "24 Hours" at #41.

== Track listing ==
No.	Title	Lyrics	Music	Arrangement	Length
1.	"24 Hours" (Make Some Noise)	Midas.T	Midas.T	DJ KOO, Maximite	3:58
2.	"Fingertips" (Pinkrush)	Seo Ji-eum	Ryan S. Jhun, LDN Noise, Kristy Lee Peters, Melanie Joy Fontana, Michel Sebastian Maximilian Schulz	Ryan S. Jhun, LDN Noise, Kristy Lee Peters, Melanie Joy Fontana, Michel Sebastian Maximilian Schulz	3:28
3.	"Don't Matter" (Splendid Rivers & Mountains (화려강산))	San E, 9999	San E, 9999	9999	3:19
4.	"Yum-Yum (얌얌)" (7 go up (Note: The group's original name was Macaroon Honey Dduk (마카롱 꿀떡).))	Seo Ji-eum	Denzil "DR" Remedios, Ryan S. Jhun, Space One, (Note: Space One is the pen name of Kim Jang-hyun, former member of Sunny Hill.) Daniel Durn, Katrine Klith Andersen, Melanie Joy Fontana, Michel Sebastian Maximilian Schulz	DR, Ryan S. Jhun, Space One, Daniel Durn, Katrine Klith Andersen, Melanie Joy Fontana, Michel Sebastian Maximilian Schulz	3:13
5.	"같은 곳에서 (In the Same Place)" (Girls on Top (소녀온탑))	Jung Jin-young	Jung Jin-young	Jung Jin-young, Command Freaks	3:07
Total length:					17:05
