= Lung Kong World Federation School Limited Lau Wong Fat Secondary School =

Co-ed aided school in Hong Kong

- 世界龍岡學校劉皇發中學
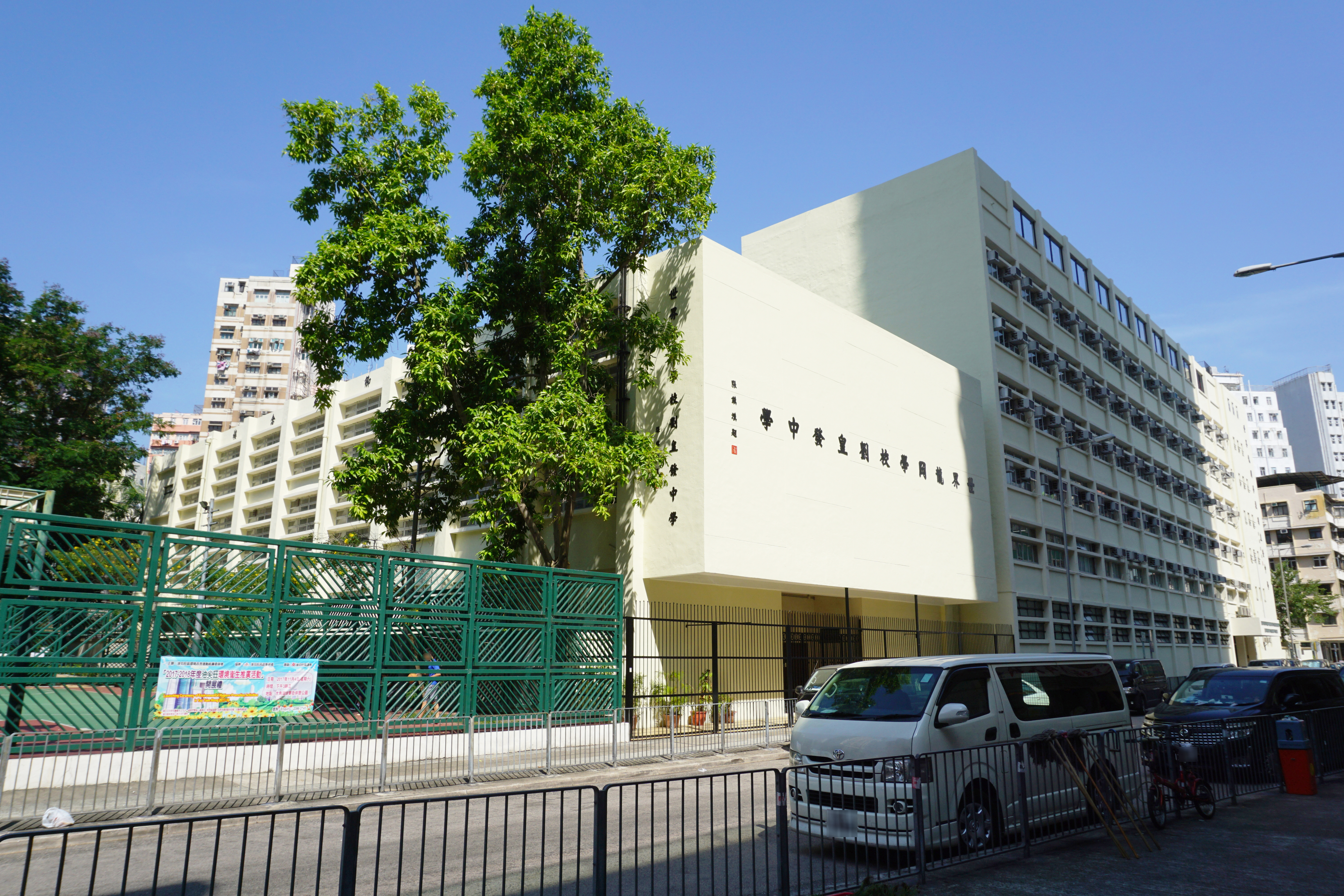

Location
- 66 Sycamore Street, Tai Kok Tsui, Kowloon; Hong Kong
- Coordinates: 22°19′33″N 114°9′45″E

Information
- School type: Aided, Co-ed
- Motto: Loyalty, Righteousness, Benevolence and Courage (忠、義、仁、勇)
- Established: 1977; 49 years ago
- School district: Yau Tsim Mong
- President: Mr. Cheung Hung-chiu
- Principal: Ms. Florence Ho
- Teaching staff: 56
- Grades: Secondary 1 to 6
- Enrollment: approx. 700
- Classes: 24
- Campus size: about 4,650 square metre
- Sponsoring Body: Lung Kong World Federation School (Hong Kong) Limited
- Website: http://www.lwfss.edu.hk/

Lung Kong World Federation School Limited Lau Wong Fat Secondary School
- Traditional Chinese: 世界龍岡學校劉皇發中學
- Simplified Chinese: 世界龙冈学校刘皇发中学
Transcriptions
Standard Mandarin
- Hanyu Pinyin: Shìjiè Lóng Gāng Xuéxiào Liú Huángfā Zhōngxué
Yue: Cantonese
- Jyutping: sai3 gaai3 lung4 gong1 hok6 haau6 lau4 wong4 faat3 zung1 hok6

Lung Kong World Federation School Limited Lau Wong Fat Secondary School (Chinese: 世界龍岡學校劉皇發中學, abbr. LWFSS) is a co-educational secondary school aided by the Education Bureau. It was established in 1977 by the Lung Kong Clans, named after Lau Wong-fat.

== School Motto ==
The School Motto, "Loyalty, Righteousness, Benevolence and Courage (忠、義、仁、勇)", bears the characteristics of historical figures Liu Bei, Guan Yu, Zhang Fei and Zhao Yun of the Three Kingdoms period. It acquires students with the upright qualities of prudence, moral sense and persistence, so that they may have a fulfilling life.

== Subjects Offered in the 2018/2019 School Year ==
S.1 - S.3	Chinese as the medium of instruction	Chinese Language, Mathematics*, Science*, Geography*, Chinese History, History*, Liberal Studies*, Computer Literacy*, Music*, P.E.*, Home Economics (S.1-S.2)*, Visual Arts*, Putonghua, Business Fundamentals (S.3)*
S.1 - S.3	English as the medium of instruction	English Language
S.1 - S.3	Adopt different medium of instruction by class or by group / school-based curriculum	Mathematics, Science, Geography, History, Computer Literacy, Music, Visual Arts, P.E., Business Fundamentals
S.4 - S.6	Chinese as the medium of instruction	Chinese Language, Liberal Studies, Chinese History, ICT, Visual Arts, P.E., Aesthetic Development
S.4 - S.6	English as the medium of instruction	English Language, Physics, Chemistry
S.4 - S.6	Adopt different medium of instruction by class or by group / school-based curriculum	Mathematics, Economics, BAFS, Biology, History, Geography

== Houses ==
- North House (忠社) (Red)
- South House (義社) (Blue)
- East House (仁社) (Green)
- West House (勇社) (Yellow)

== Public transportation to school ==
- Buses: 2, 2A, 2A, 36B, 212, 118
- MTR: Prince Edward station Exit C2 or D

== Notable alumni ==
- Antonio Lam Hin-Chung (林衍聰), a Hong Kong professional fencer.

== Affiliated schools ==
- LKWFSL Wong Yiu Nam Primary School Chinese: 世界龍岡學校黃耀南小學
- LKWFS Ltd. Lau Tak Yung Memorial Primary School Chinese: 世界龍岡學校劉德容紀念小學
- LKWFSL Chu Sui Lan Anglo-Chinese Kindergarten Chinese: 世界龍岡學校朱瑞蘭(中英文)幼稚園

== See also ==
- Education in Hong Kong
- List of secondary schools in Hong Kong
