= Ariaz =

South Korean girl group

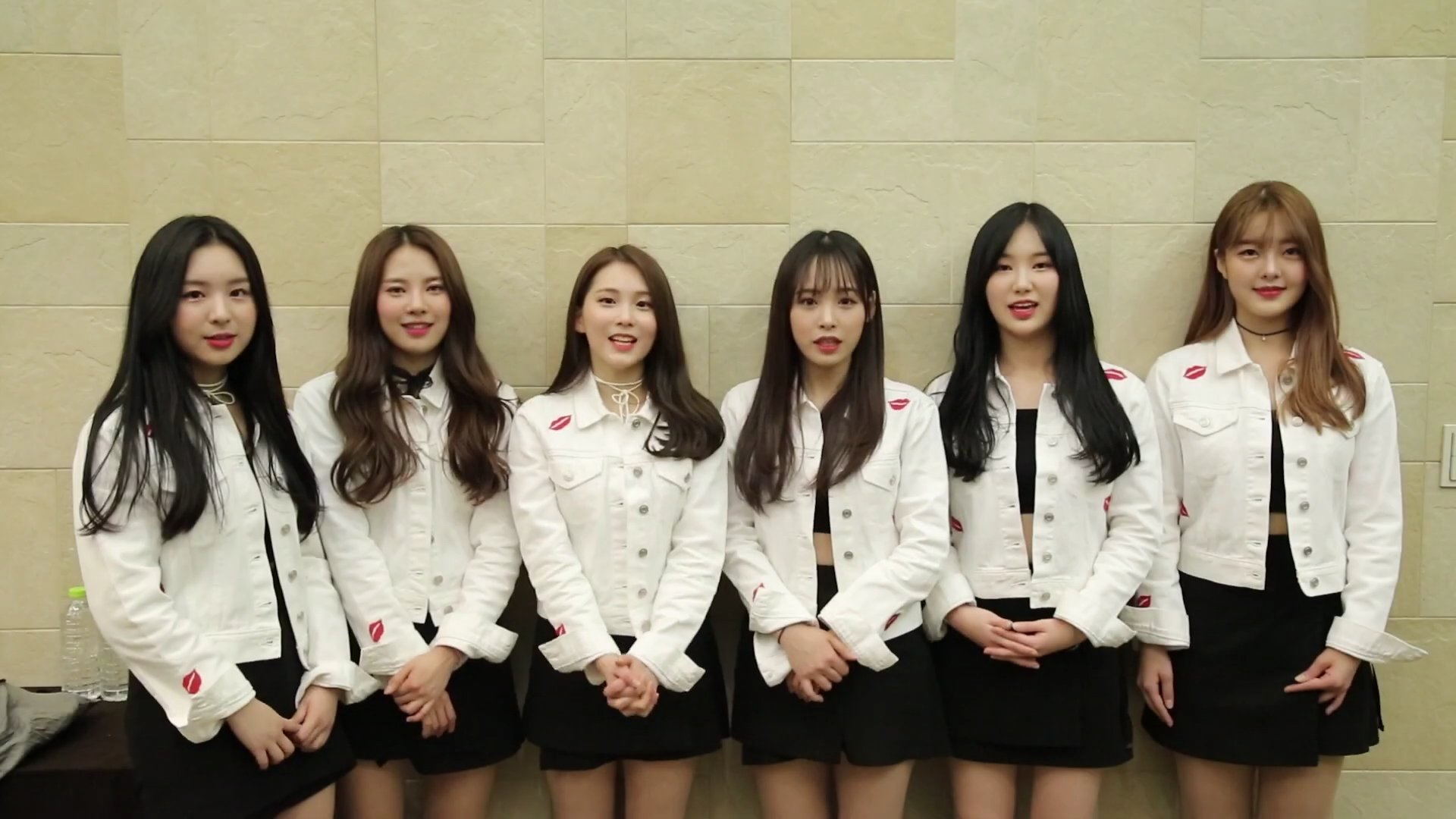
- Ariaz in December 2019; From left to right: Jueun, Sihyeon, Yunji, Dawon, Yeori, Hyogyeong

Background information
- Origin: Seoul, South Korea
- Genres: K-pop; R&B; dance
- Years active: 2019–2024
- Label: Rising Star
- Past members: Yunji; Yeori; Hyogyeong; Jueun; Sihyeon; Dawon
- Website: Official fancafe

Ariaz (Korean: 아리아즈; stylized in all caps) was a South Korean girl group formed by Rising Star Entertainment, a subsidiary label of Star Empire Entertainment in 2019. The group made its official debut on October 24, 2019, with their first EP Grand Opera. As of 2024 the group has disbanded. Its final lineup consisted of members Dawon and Sihyeon. The other members parted ways with the company earlier in their careers.

== History ==
=== Pre-debut ===
Prior to the group's debut, various members already had some experience in the entertainment industry. Yunji had appeared in the fifth season of the survival series Superstar K in 2013, and later appeared in the first season of reality television talent show Produce 101 in 2015 along with future band-mate Sihyeon. Yunji and Sihyeon were set to debut in the girl group OMZM with other members, however, the group's debut was postponed and their fancafe was later temporarily closed. Sihyeon sang "Wonderful Day (오늘 같은 날)" for the soundtrack of the drama Fantastic in 2016.

Prior to Ariaz, Hyogyeong had released numerous songs as a soloist, including some using the stage name Mugayeong (머가영). Hyogyeong also represented Star Empire Entertainment in the survival reality show Mix Nine in 2017. Yunji, Sihyeon, Hyogyeong and Yeori had been backup dancers before their debut, for groups such as Jewelry, ZE:A, Nine Muses and Imfact. Dawon appeared in an episode of episode of I Can See Your Voice in early 2019, performing I.O.I's song "Downpour" along with Hong Juhyeon and Im Doyeon.

The group was briefly known as Empire Girls (Korean: 엠파이어 걸스) prior to their debut. A three-episode variety show, Empire Girls at the MT, aired before their debut. The show was a bonding experience for the members, and showcased their teamwork.

=== 2019–2021: Debut with Grand Opera and digital single remakes ===
On September 16, 2019, Rising Star Entertainment, a subsidiary of Star Empire Entertainment, released a statement to announce that Empire Girls would be debuting under the name Ariaz in October.

Various teasers were released for the EP, and Grand Opera was released on October 24, 2019, along with its lead single "Moonlight Aria" and its accompanying music video. The EP is the first in a trilogy the group aims to release. Their debut showcase was held the same day at the Ilji Art Hall in Gangnam, Seoul.

On June 26, 2021, the group released the new digital single "I Like You", a remake from the girl group Jewelry's hit single "I Really Like You".

On September 30, 2021, the group released the digital single "Hot & Cold (2021)", another from Jewelry's hit single "Hot & Cold".

=== 2022–present: Members departure ===
On April 10, 2022, Rising Star Entertainment announced that Yunji, Yeori and Hyogyeong have terminated their contracts with them and left the group. On the same day, Jueun posted on Instagram confirming that she has left the group.

== Members ==
- Yunji (윤지)
- Yeori (여리)
- Hyogyeong (효경)
- Jueun (주은)
- Dawon (다원)
- Sihyeon (시현)

== Discography ==
=== Extended plays ===
Title	Details	Peak chart positions	Sales
Title	Details	KOR	Sales
Grand Opera	Released: October 24, 2019; Label: Rising Star Entertainment; Formats: CD, digital download; Track listing: 1. "Assemble #1"; 2. "Ouch!"; 3. "Moonlight Aria" ("까만 밤의 아리아"); 4. "Drama"; 5. "Where U R" (Yunji X Dawon Aria)	33	KOR: 1,028

=== Singles ===
Title	Year	Album
"Moonlight Aria" (까만 밤의 아리아)	2019	Grand Opera
"I Like You" (니가 참 좋아)	2021	Non-album singles
"Hot & Cold (2021)"	2021	Non-album singles
