= As One (girl group) =

Hong Kong girl group (2012–2016)

- Origin: Hong Kong
- Genres: Cantopop, K-pop
- Years active: 2012–2016
- Labels: (Hong Kong) Sun Entertainment Culture (South Korea) Chorokbaem Juna E&M, CJ E&M Music
- Past members: Shin; Nata; Oli; Elfa; Chloe; Kayan

As One (Korean: 에즈 원; stylized as AS ONE and in South Korea as AS1 to avoid confusion with the South Korean musical duo of the same name) was a Hong Kong Cantopop girl group formed by Sun Entertainment Culture and choreographer Sunny Wong.

The meaning behind the group's name is based on the concept of unity, with the members united together "as one". The group was consisted of four members; Shin, Oli, Elfa and Nata. The group promoted as a quartet for two years until Oli's departure in August 2014 to pursue her studies. Subsequently, two new members (Chloe and Kayan) joined the group in March 2015 after emerging as champions of a scouting audition. Elfa announced her temporary hiatus from the group in May 2015 due to sustained injuries. As of 15 May 2015, As One is promoting as a quartet with Shin, Nata, Chloe and Kayan.

They were trained in South Korea and made a comeback in 2015. Shin participated in South Korea Mnet's survival show Produce 101 in 2016; during this time, the group continued with three members.

== Members ==
Members
Stage Name		Birth Name			Birthdate	Nationality	Debut in group	Position
Stage Name	Hangul	Hanzi	Hangul	Latin Characters	Birthdate	Nationality	Debut in group	Position
Chloe	클로이	蘇皓兒	소호아	So Ho Yee	6 April 1994 (age 32); Hong Kong	Hong Kong	24 July 2015; 14 July 2015	Vocalist, Visual
Chloe	클로이	蘇皓兒	소호아	Chloe So	6 April 1994 (age 32); Hong Kong	Hong Kong	24 July 2015; 14 July 2015	Vocalist, Visual
Kayan (renamed as "Kira Chan")	카얀	陳嘉茵(renamed as "陳葦璇")	진가인	Chan Ka Yan	10 November 1995 (age 31); Hong Kong	Hong Kong	24 July 2015; 14 July 2015	Main Vocalist, Lead Dancer
Former Members						Hong Kong		
Oli	올리	黃佳宜	황가의	Huang Jia Yi	13 November 1993 (age 33); China	China	25 June 2012	Vocalist, Visual
Oli	올리	黃佳宜	황가의	Oli Huang	13 November 1993 (age 33); China	China	25 June 2012	Vocalist, Visual
Elfa	엘파	邱念恩	구념은	Yau Nim Yan	5 May 1993 (age 33); Hong Kong	Hong Kong	25 June 2012	Lead Dancer, Vocalist
Elfa	엘파	邱念恩	구념은	Francesca Yau	5 May 1993 (age 33); Hong Kong	Hong Kong	25 June 2012	Lead Dancer, Vocalist
Nata (renamed as "Tania Chan")	나타	陳苑澄	진원징	Chan Yuen Ching	29 October 1994 (age 32); Hong Kong	Hong Kong	25 June 2012; 14 July 2015	Main Dancer, Lead Vocalist
Shin	신	吳思佳	응씨카이(오사가)	Ng Sze Kai	2 June 1994 (age 32); China	Hong Kong	25 June 2012; 14 July 2015	Leader, Main Rapper, Lead Vocalist, Face of Group
Shin	신	吳思佳	응씨카이(오사가)	Katarina Ng	2 June 1994 (age 32); China	Hong Kong	25 June 2012; 14 July 2015	Leader, Main Rapper, Lead Vocalist, Face of Group

=== Timeline ===
Member	2012	2013		2014				2015				2016		2017	
Member	2012	MAY	JUN	JAN	FEB	JUL	AUG	APR	MAY	NOV	DEC	MAR	APR	FEB	JUL
Oli															
Elfa															
Nata															
Shin															
Chloe															
Kayan															

== Discography ==
Extended Plays

- 2013: AsOnE

Cantonese Singles

- 2012: "Catch Me Up"
- 2013: "Red Hot Hits 2013"
- 2013: "4Ever"
- 2014: "Be With U"
- 2014: "New Girl"
- 2015: "Candy Ball"
- 2016: "Hey ya"

Korean Singles

- 2015: "캔디볼 (Candy Ball)"

Other Songs

- 2014: "Let's Goal"

== Chart performance ==
Peak
Album	Song	903	RTHK	997	TVB	Notes
2012
AsOnE	"Catch Me Up"	9	–	6	6	Debut single
AsOnE	"Red Hot Hits 2013"	–	–	–	–	Medley：火熱動感La La La／熱力節拍Wou Bom Ba／打開天空
2013
AsOnE	"4EVER"	13	18	3	6	Alternative Version: EVER & EVER Remix
2014
	"Be With U"	–	–	5	5	
	"New Girl"	14	–	3	9	The 3-member era (Without Oli)
2015
	"Candy Ball"	3	6	5	3	The new 4-member era (Shin, Chloe, Nata, KaYan)
2016
	"Hey Ya"	9	7	2	5	DBC: 8

Total of number one singles
903	RTHK	997	TVB	Notes
0	0	0	0	All Kill counts：0

(*) Still charting

== Music videos ==
Year of Release	Song	Music Video	Members
2012	Catch Me Up	Catch Me Up Music Video on YouTube	Shin, Nata, Oli, Elfa
2013	Red Hot Hits 2013	Red Hot Hits 2013 Music Video on YouTube	Shin, Nata, Oli, Elfa
2013	4EVER	4EVER Music Video on YouTube	Shin, Nata, Oli, Elfa
2014	Let's GoalHong Kong Pegasus FC Cheering song	Let's Goal Music Video on YouTube	Shin, Nata, Elfa
2014	Be With U	Be With U Music Video on YouTube	Shin, Nata, Oli, Elfa
2014	New Girl	New Girl Music Video on YouTube	Shin, Nata, Elfa
2015	캔디볼	캔디볼 Music Video on YouTube	Shin, Nata, Chloe, Kayan
2015	Candy Ball	Candy Ball Music Video on YouTube	Shin, Nata, Chloe, Kayan
2016	헤이야	헤이야 Music Video on YouTube	Shin, Nata, Chloe, Kayan
2016	Hey Ya!	Hey Ya! Music Video on YouTube	Shin, Nata, Chloe, Kayan

== Books ==
- 2014: "Girls' Anecdotes"

== Endorsements ==
Year	Endorsements	Members
2013	Blue Girl Beer	All
2013	So Drink	All
2013	Mask House	All
2013–2015	SANTAI Eco Fishery	All

== Awards ==
Year	Award	Category	Result	Ref.
2013	IFPI Hong Kong Top Sales Music Award	Best Sales (Local New Group)	Won	
2013	Metro Radio Music Awards	Best Rookie Group	Won	
2013	The 9th Music King Awards	Best Rookie Group	Won	
2014	Metro Radio Music Awards	Best Group	Won	
2014	The 10th Music King Awards	Most Improved Group (Hong Kong)	Won	
