= Lunarsolar =

2020–2022 South Korean girl group

- Origin: Seoul, South Korea
- Genres: K-pop
- Years active: 2020–2022
- Labels: JPlanet; Teichiku
- Past members: Eseo; Taeryeong; Jian; Yuuri
- Website: jplanetentertainment.com/lunarsolar/

Lunarsolar (stylized in all-caps; Korean: 루나솔라) was a four-member South Korean girl group formed by JPlanet Entertainment. The group debuted on September 2, 2020, with their single album Solar: Flare. On May 22, 2022, JPlanet Entertainment announced the disbandment of the group, following the termination of the members' contracts.

== History ==
=== Pre-debut ===
Before joining JPlanet Entertainment, 3 out of 4 members were previously involved in the music industry. Previously, Taeryeong was a contestant on Produce 101 but she was eliminated and ranked at 57th place. She also was a participant in Mix Nine but she was eliminated and placed at 46th place. She was seen performing with girl group A-Daily in October 2018, but she was never announced as an official member of the group. She was also part of ONO Entertainment's pre-debut girl group Blackmamba.

Jian was a former member of girl group S.E.T with the stage name TaeE and participated in The Unit: Idol Rebooting Project but was eliminated and placed at 61st place.

Yuuri was a member of Japanese girl group I'S9 in 2013, until she left (or "graduated") in November 2015. In 2017, she joined a Co-ed Jpop group IsTaR and left in 2018.

In 2018, JPlanet Entertainment announced Rookie Planet, a project to promote their trainees (or "rookies") to the world before their official debut. They often posted dance covers, vocal covers, and reaction videos. The members were revealed within a 1 year period, starting with Jieun (who later became Jian), Taeryeong, Hyeonjeong (who later became Eseo), Yuuri, and Sujin. Sujin left sometime in early 2020. On March 27, 2020, Jian appeared on I Can See Your Voice 7, as well as being a cover muse for the YouTube channel MUPLY.

=== 2020–2021: Debut with Solar : Flare, Solar : Rise and Christmas is You ===
On July 13, 2020, JPlanet Entertainment announced that they would debut their first girl group and subsequently released the logo image. They released "identity photos" in the order of Jian, Yuuri, Eseo, and Taeryeong starting on July 13, 2020, and ending on July 16, 2020. They released 'Lunar' versions and 'Solar' versions of the identity photos.

The group debuted on September 2, 2020, with their single album Solar : Flare, alongside the music video for their title track "Oh Ya Ya Ya" and had their debut stage on MCountdown on September 3, 2020.

The group released their second single album Solar : Rise, and its title track "Dadada" on April 7, 2021. The group announced on the same day that they were planning to make their debut in the Japanese music industry and signed a contract with label Teichiku Entertainment for future Japanese activities regarding music and management. They are the first artist to sign under the partnership between Teichiku and VICLIP, which was announced on December 24, 2019. The group also opened their official Japanese website ahead of their Japanese debut.

The group released their third single album Christmas is You on December 8, 2021.

=== 2022: Disbandment and Do You Wanna Get Down ===
On May 22, 2022, it was revealed that Lunarsolar was to disband, as the members' contracts with JPlanet Entertainment were terminated.

Before their disbandment, the group released a final single titled "Do You Wanna Get Down" on May 23, 2022.

== Former members ==
- Eseo (이서)
- Taeryeong (태령)
- Jian (지안)
- Yuuri (유우리)

== Discography ==
=== Single albums ===
Title	Details	Peak chart positions	Sales
Title	Details	KOR	Sales
Solar : Flare	Released: September 2, 2020; Label: JPlanet Entertainment; Formats: CD, digital download, streaming; Track listing: 1. Oh Ya Ya Ya (노는 게 제일 좋아); 2. Oh Ya Ya Ya (노는 게 제일 좋아) (Inst.)	40	KOR: 4,360
Solar : Rise	Released: April 7, 2021; Label: JPlanet Entertainment; Formats: CD, digital download, streaming; Track listing: 1. Dadada; 2. Bom Bi Di Bom; 3. Lonely; 4. Dadada (Inst.); 5. Bom Bi Di Bom (Inst.); 6. Lonely (Inst.)	48	—
Christmas is You	Released: December 8, 2021; Label: JPlanet Entertainment; Formats: Digital download, streaming; Track listing: 1. Christmas is You; 2. Christmas is You (Inst.)	—	—
Do You Wanna Get Down	Released: May 23, 2022; Label: JPlanet Entertainment; Formats: Digital download, streaming; Track listing: 1. Do You Wanna Get Down; 2. Do You Wanna Get Down (Inst.)	—	—

=== Singles ===
Title	Year	Peak chart positions	Album
Title	Year	KOR	Album
"Oh Ya Ya Ya" (노는 게 제일 좋아)	2020	—	Solar: Flare
"Dadada"	2021	— (Note: "Dadada" did not enter Gaon Digital Chart, but debuted and peaked at number 130 on Gaon Download Chart.)	Solar: Rise
"Christmas is You"	2021	—	Christmas is You
"Do You Wanna Get Down"	2022	—	Do You Wanna Get Down

== Filmography ==
=== Music videos ===
Title	Year	Director(s)
"Oh Ya Ya Ya"	2020	VISHOP at VIKINGS LEAGUE
"Dadada"	2021	Shin Hee-won
"Christmas Is You"	2021	Unknown
"Do You Wanna Get Down"	2022	Unknown

== Awards and nominations ==
Award Ceremony	Year	Category	Nominee(s)	Result	Ref.
Korea First Brand Awards	2021	New Female Artist Award	Lunarsolar	Nominated	
Asia Artist Awards	2021	Female Idol Popularity Award	Lunarsolar	Nominated	
