= HashTag (group) =

South Korean girl group

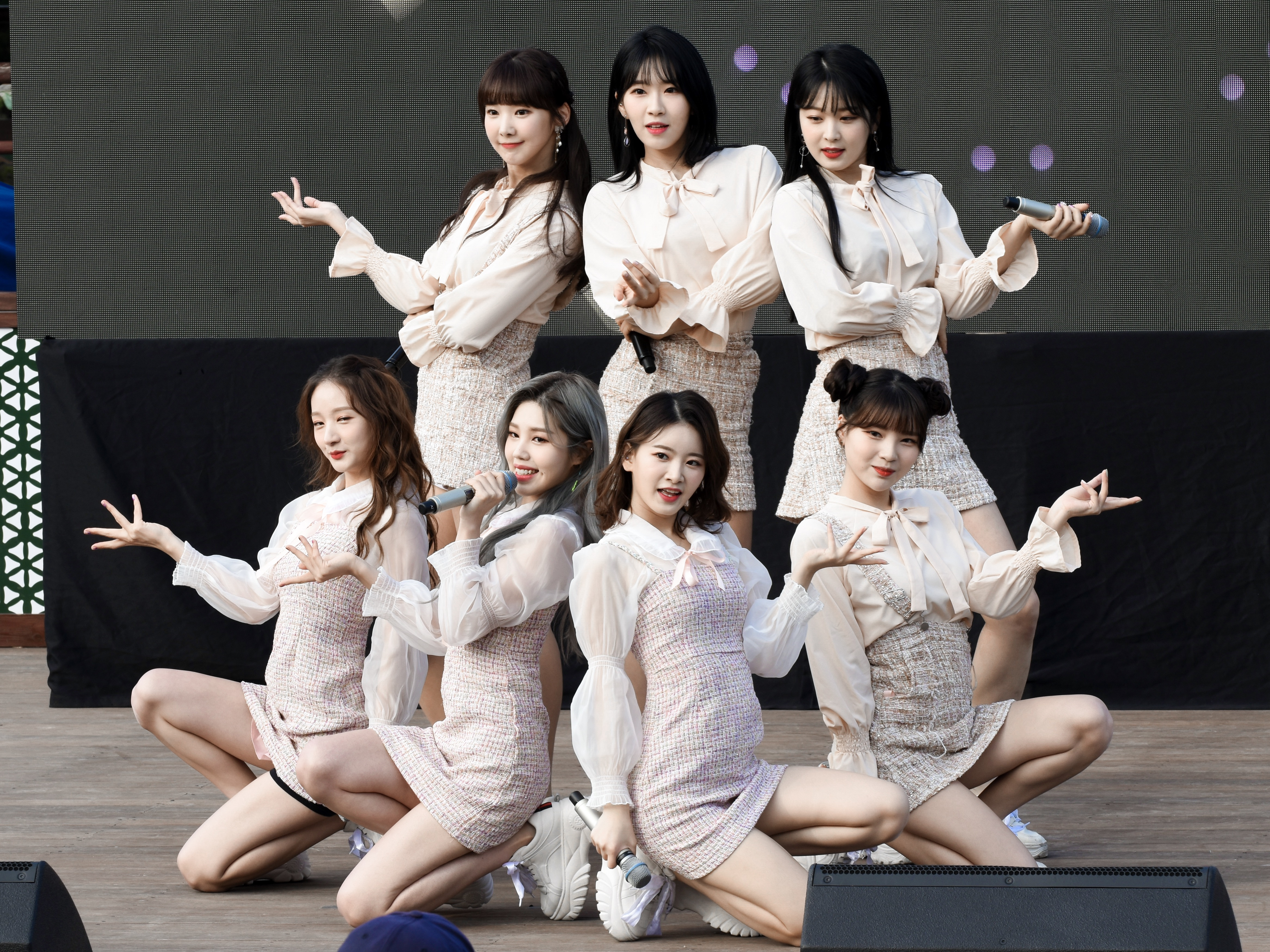
- HashTag performing at the 4th Happy Festival of Urban Kids, November 2019

Background information
- Origin: Seoul, South Korea
- Genres: K-pop; Dance
- Years active: 2017–2024
- Labels: Luk Factory
- Past members: Hyunji; Sua; Seungmin; Subin; Sojin; Dajeong; Aeji
- Website: HashTag Official Homepage

HashTag (Korean: 해시태그), stylized as haShtag or HASHTAG, was a South Korean girl group formed by Luk Factory and produced by Kan Mi-youn. The group debuted on October 11, 2017, with The girl next door., and disbanded on October 12, 2024.

== History ==
=== Pre-debut ===
Dajeong competed in season 1 of Produce 101 as a trainee of Hello Music Entertainment. She was eliminated in episode 5, with her final ranking being 62nd.

=== 2017: Debut with The girl next door ===
On September 8, 2017 former Baby V.O.X member Kan Mi-youn confirmed that she will be producing a seven-member girl group named HashTag and will debut in October. On October 11, the group's debut EP The girl next door was released. The group started album promotions through a showcase on October 10, then made their broadcast debut on October 13, through Music Bank.

=== 2018: Sub-unit Purple ===
On September 18, 2018 members Dajeong, Seungmin and Subin debuted as the project trio Purple (퍼플) with the digital single Maemmaeya.

=== 2019: #Aeji #paSsion and My Style ===
The group had a comeback on April 16, 2019 with their 2nd mini album #Aeji #paSsion.

The group came back on October 1, 2019 with their 1st digital single My Style.

=== 2023–2024: Line-up changes, Diamond and disbandment ===
On March 21, 2023, Luk Factory announced the departures of Dajeong and Aeji, and that the group will continue as 5 members.

Hashtag released the digital single Diamond on June 12.

On October 12, 2024, Hashtag announced their disbandment, as five of the members contracts expired.

== Former members ==
- Hyunji (Korean: 현지)
- Sua (수아)
- Seungmin (승민)
- Subin (수빈)
- Sojin (소진)
- Dajeong (다정) — Leader
- Aeji (애지)

== Discography ==
=== Extended plays ===
Title	Album details	Peak chart positions	Sales
Title	Album details	KOR	Sales
The girl next door	Released: October 11, 2017; Label: Luk Factory, Genie Music; Format: CD, digital download; Track listing: 1. Intro; 2. Hue (ㅇㅇ); 3. Like That (그런거); 4. Hz; 5. When It Rains (비가 내리면); 6. Hue (ㅇㅇ) inst.	41	KOR: 1,068+
#Aeji #paSsion	Released: April 16, 2019; Label: Luk Factory, Genie Music; Format: CD, digital download; Track listing: 1. Intro; 2. Freesm; 3. Love Game; 4. Hello This Night (안녕이밤); 5. Freesm inst.	53	KOR: 598

=== Singles ===
Title	Year	Album
"Hue (ㅇㅇ)"	2017	The girl next door
"Maemmaeya" (맴매야 (I 씐나)) (as PURPLE)	2018	Non-album single
"Freesm"	2019	#Aeji #paSsion
"My Style" (어때보여)	2019	Non-album single
"Diamond"	2023	Non-album single

== Filmography ==
=== Music videos ===
Title	Year	Notes
"Hue (ㅇㅇ)"	2017	
"Maemmaeya" (맴매야 (I 씐나)) (as PURPLE)	2018	
"Freesm"	2019	
"Diamond"	2023	Performance version
