= Kang Si-ra =

South Korean singer (born 1991)

- 강시라
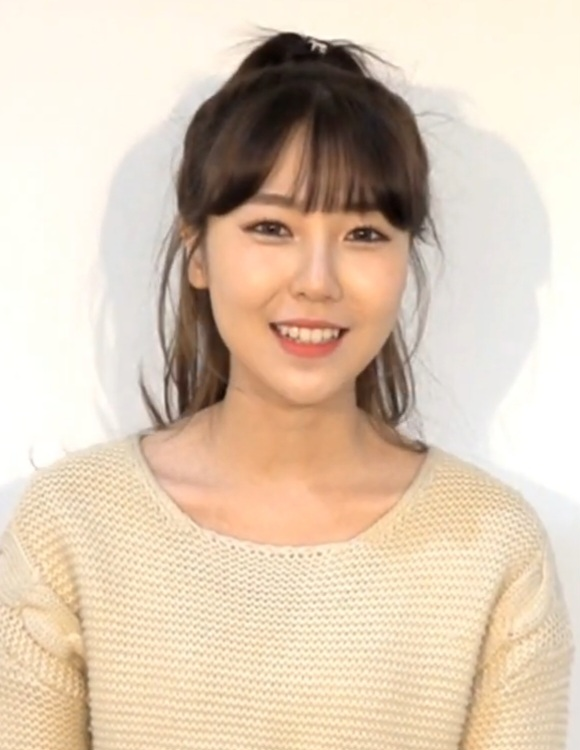
- Kang Si-ra in 2018
- Born: June 13, 1991 (age 34); Daejeon, South Korea
- Occupation: Singer
- Musical career
- Genres: K-pop; Ballad
- Instrument: Vocals
- Years active: 2016–present
- Labels: Chungchun Music

Korean name
- Hangul: 강시라
- RR: Gang Sira
- MR: Kang Sira

Kang Si-ra (Korean: 강시라; born June 13, 1991), is a South Korean singer. She was a contestant on Produce 101. She released her first EP, Sira, on January 19, 2017.

== Discography ==
=== Extended plays ===
Title	Album details	Peak chart positions	Sales
Title	Album details	KOR	Sales
Sira	Released: January 19, 2017; Label: Chungchun Music, CJ E&M; Formats: CD, digital download	52	—

=== Singles ===
Title	Year	Peak chart positions	Sales (DL)	Album
Title	Year	KOR	Sales (DL)	Album
"Don't Wanna Forget" (못 잊어)	2017	—	—	Sira
"—" denotes releases that did not chart.

=== Soundtrack appearances ===
Year	Title	Album
2017	"Because Of You" (니가 있기에)	Duel OST
