= Sunny Wong (choreographer) =

Hong Kong choreographer

- Born: Wong Kwok Wing (黃國榮); November 4, 1967 (age 58); Hong Kong
- Occupations: Choreographer, Dancer
- Years active: 1987–present
- Spouse: Angela Hung (m. 2009)
- Career
- Current group: Sunny Unit; Sunny Wong Dance School - HK
- Dances: influences from Michael Jackson
- Website: Sunny Wong Mini-Blog

Sunny Wong Kwok-wing (born November 4, 1967) is a Hong Kong choreographer from the 1980s to the present. He has been in the dancing industry for over 30 years. He then started Sunny Wong Dance School in 2007 in order to train new age dancers. As the principal of the school, he put much effort on organizing courses for the teenagers and kids.

== Biography ==
Sunny Wong is a renown choreographer in Hong Kong, providing stage performance suggestions to most of the concerts in Hong Kong. He works with pop-stars like Aaron Kwok, Andy Lau, Kelly Chan, Hacken Lee, and Alan Tam.

== Career ==
=== Early years ===
In 1984 at the age of 17, Wong joined a dancer training course at TVB, where his talent for dancing was immediately recognized. He also met the singer Aaron Kwok, who became the Cantopop Four Heavenly Kings (四大天王)., in the training course. Later on, after Aaron Kwok came back from Taiwan, Kwok invited Wong to be the choreographer of MTV. They started their lifelong cooperation.
