= Blady =

South Korean girl group

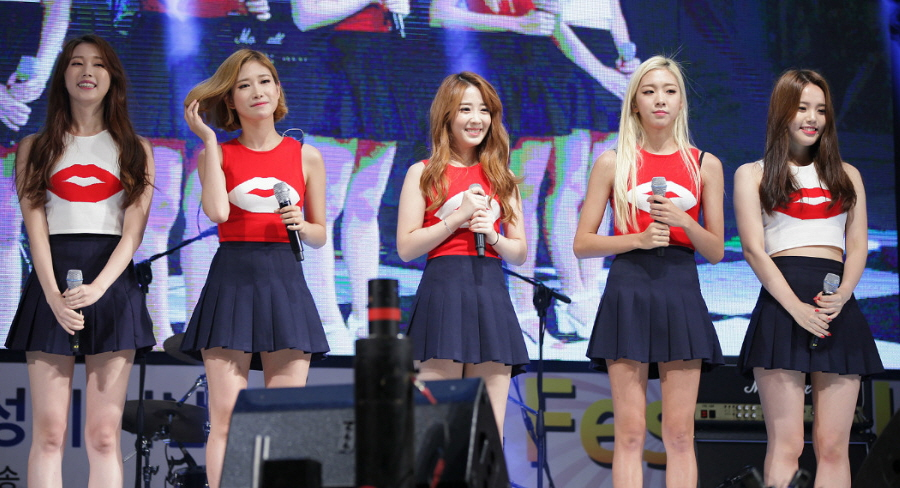
- Left to right: Dayeong, Gabin, Giru, Tina, and Yeeun.

Background information
- Origin: Seoul, South Korea
- Genres: K-pop
- Years active: 2011–2017
- Labels: SY6; Star Planet
- Past members: Tina; Giru; Dayeong; Yeeun; Gabin; Darae; Bunhong; Sunyeong; Nahyun; Coco; Kangyoon; Yeji; Soojin
- Website: cafe.naver.com/blady

Blady (Korean: 블레이디) was a five-member South Korean girl group originally formed by SY6 Entertainment and later produced by Star Planet. The group released the pre-debut retro-inspired single "찌릿찌릿 (Spark Spark)" on May 16, 2011 and their title track "미친 날 (Crazy Day)" on July 27, 2011.

== History ==
=== 2011: Debut, "Spark Spark", and "Crazy Day" ===
In 2011, Blady made their debut with four members: Darae, Bunhong, Sunyeong and Kangyoon. The group released the pre-debut single "찌릿찌릿 (Spark Spark)", on May 16, 2011. As early rookies they received praises from hit composer Shinsadong Tiger, who's known for producing for Beast and 4minute, as he saw in their training process that their "passion and skills" stood above many other girl groups debuting at the time. He went on to say, "In anticipation for their debut, the members have been sleeping three hours a night in order to devote everything else to their rehearsals."

Their official title track, titled "미친 날 (Crazy Day)", was released on July 27, 2011. The music video for "Crazy Day" was shot in 3D in the Maldives by director Young Man Kang. The clip also featured dance moves choreographed by Main Spirit who has also worked with Lee Hyori and Bada.

At the end of their debuting year, the girls took home the 2011 19th Republic of Korea Culture Entertainment Awards Idol Music Rookie of the Year award. Also, SY6 added a new member, Nahyun.

=== 2013–2014: Line-up changes, "Blood Type B Girl", and Blady Soul ===
Despite rumors of disbandment in 2012 and early 2013, Blady released a single "B형 여자 (Blood Type B Girl)" on November 18, 2013. The group returned with five members, Kangyoon being the only first generation member to return. Thus, she was promoted to leader status in the group. This comeback saw the addition of new members Coco, Tina, Yeji and Soojin.

The single release of "B형 여자 (Blood Type B Girl)" also saw a new remixed version of "미친 날 (Crazy Day)" titled "Bring Bring" with a stronger hip hop and rock flavor than its predecessor. "B형 여자 (Blood Type B Girl)" is a collaboration between renowned producer C-Luv (who has produced for Rain, MBLAQ and Kim Hyun Joong) and songwriter Stay Tuned. The song features a funky urban electronic beat and draws inspiration from the fact that all the members of Blady have blood type B.

Blady Soul was the first special unit to come from Blady, consisting of members Yeji and Soojin. The duo released a digital single, "떠나가지마 (Please Don't Leave Me)", to commemorate White Day. The song garnered attention for its smooth R&B style in contrast to Blady's normal bubblegum-pop style.

In late 2014, it was revealed that members Coco, Kangyoon, and Yeji had left the group.

=== 2015–2017: Line-up changes, Renovation, "Secret Number" and disbandment ===
In March 2015, it was revealed that member Soojin had also left Blady. Not long after, Star Planet announced that the group would be making another comeback as a five-member group. Along with Tina, there would be four new members, Giru, Dayeong, Yeeun, and Gabin, added to Blady's lineup.

A showcase was held on March 9, 2015 in Seoul to kick off promotions for their mini album 'Renovation'. On March 30, 2015, Blady released their music video for "Come to Me", the title track for Renovation, featuring the new lineup.

On July 27, 2015, Blady released a special summer single entitled "Secret Number(비밀열쇠)". The first version of the music video was released the same day on both Blady's and 1THEK's official YouTube channels, and the second version was released on October 19 of the same year. Blady began promotions for "Secret Number(비밀열쇠)" the following week the song was released.

Member Giru released a solo project single, Blady Solo Part.1 - Spring Love Scent (봄 사랑향기) ft Unplugboy (언플러그보이), on April 29, 2016.

On October 20, 2017, the members all made farewell posts on Instagram, saying the group had disbanded.

== Members ==
=== Former ===
- Darae (다래)
- Bunhong (분홍)
- Sunyeong (선영)
- Nahyun (나현)
- Coco (코코)
- Kangyoon (강윤)
- Yeji (예지)
- Soojin (수진)
- Gabin (가빈)
- Dayeong (다영)
- Giru (기루)
- Tina (티나)
- Ye-eun (예은)

== Discography ==
=== Extended plays ===
Title	Album details	Peak chart positions	Sales
Title	Album details	KOR	Sales
리노베이션 (Renovation)	Released: March 31, 2015; Label: SY6 Entertainment/Star Planet; Format: CD, digital download	25	KOR: 653

=== Singles ===
Title	Year	Peak chart positions	Album
Title	Year	KOR	Album
"Spark Spark (찌릿찌릿)"	2011	—	Non-album single
"Crazy Day (미친날)"	2011	138	Blady 1st Time Crazy Day
"Blood Type B Girl (B형여자)"	2013	181	Blady's 2nd Single Album B형여자
"Please Don't Leave Me (떠나가지마)" (as Blady Soul)	2014	—	Non-album single
"Secret Number (비밀열쇠)"	2015	—	Non-album single
"Spring Love Fragrance (봄 사랑향기) "	2016	—	Blady Solo Part.1 - Giru
"—" denotes releases that did not chart or were not released in that region.

== Music videos ==
Year	Title
2011	"미친날 (Crazy Day)"
2011	"미친날 (Crazy Day)" second version
2013	"B형여자 (Blood Type B Girl)"
2013	"B형여자 (Blood Type B Girl)" flash mob ver.
2015	"다가와 (Come Closer)"
2015	"다가와 (Come Closer)" long take dance ver. black
2015	"Secret Number (비밀열쇠)"
2015	"Secret Number (비밀열쇠)" second version

== Awards ==
- 2011 19th Republic of Korea Culture Entertainment Awards Idol Music Rookie of the Year
