= Pick Me (song) =

2015 song by contestants of Produce 101

Single by Produce 101 contestants
- Released: December 17, 2015
- Recorded: 2015
- Genre: K-pop; dance-pop; electropop; EDM
- Length: 3:46
- Label: CJ E&M
- Songwriter: Midas-T
- Producers: DJ KOO; Maximite

Music video
- "Pick Me" on YouTube

"Pick Me" is a song by the contestants of Produce 101. It was released online as a digital single on December 17, 2015, by CJ E&M, along with a music video. It was unveiled for the first time on Episode 453 of M! Countdown that same day. The group was presented by Jang Keun-suk, and 98 out of 101 members showcased their talents through the song.

The song was used in the South Korean legislative elections for the National Assembly.

== Composition ==
"Pick Me" is an electronic dance music song, written by veteran composer Kim Chang-hwan under the pen name Midas-T, and composed by DJ Koo from K-pop legend duo CLON and Maximite.

== Commercial performance ==
"Pick Me" debuted at number 45 on the Gaon Digital Chart, on the chart issue dated February 2–13, 2016, as a hot track. In its second week, the song climbed to number 24. In its third week, the song peaked at number 9.

The song entered at number 30 for the month of February 2016 and peaked at number 13 for the month of March.

The song placed at number 53 for the 2016 year-end chart, with 893,723 downloads sold and 38,956,800 streams.

== Charts ==
Chart	Peak position	Sales
Gaon Digital Chart	9	893,723
