= We Will Eat Well =

2016 South Korean television series

- Promotional poster
- Also known as: Girls Who Eat Well
- Hangul: 잘 먹겠습니다
- RR: Jal meokgetseumnida
- MR: Chal mŏkkessŭmnida
- Genre: Variety
- Presented by: Moon Hee-joon; Jo Se-ho; Yang Se-hyung
- Country of origin: South Korea
- Original language: Korean
- No. of seasons: 1
- No. of episodes: 26

Production
- Production locations: Seoul, South Korea
- Production company: GO Production

Original release
- Network: JTBC
- Release: June 29, 2016 – February 2, 2017

We Will Eat Well is a South Korean television program. It was transformed into a food talk show, rather than its initial concept of a girl group "muk-bang" competition (eating broadcast).

== Hosts/MCs ==
- Moon Hee-joon (June 29, 2016–February 2, 2017)
- Jo Se-ho (June 29, 2016–February 2, 2017)
- Yang Se-hyung (June 29, 2016–February 2, 2017)

== Controversy ==
Girls Who Eat Well originally was a "muk-bang" show in which members of different girl groups would compete by eating a variety of foods in order to earn the title of the best girl group eater. The format was criticized by viewers uncomfortable watching girl group members be judged on their eating. The show aired two episodes before it was renamed to We Will Eat Well and became a food talk show.

== List of episodes ==
=== Girls Who Eat Well ===
Episode	Air date	Featured guests	Notes
1	June 29, 2016	Dahyun, Tzuyu (Twice), Seulgi (Red Velvet), Jun Hyoseong (Secret), Kyungri (9MUSES), Namjoo (Apink), Jiho (Oh My Girl) and Mina (I.O.I, Gugudan)	
2	July 6, 2016	Dahyun, Tzuyu (Twice), Seulgi (Red Velvet), Jun Hyoseong (Secret), Kyungri (9MUSES), Namjoo (Apink), Jiho (Oh My Girl) and Mina (I.O.I, Gugudan)	Program renamed to We Will Eat Well

=== We Will Eat Well ===
Episode	Air date	Featured guests	Notes
1	July 23, 2016	Jeongyeon, Momo (Twice), Jinwoon (2AM) and Mina (I.O.I, Gugudan)	
2	July 30, 2016	Bomi (Apink), Jiho (Oh My Girl), Luna (f(x))	
3	August 6, 2016	Jinwoon (2AM), Lee Soo-min, Kim So-hee, Yoon Chae-kyung (I.B.I (band))	C.I.V.A. (The God of Music 2 cast)
4	August 13, 2016	Kim Young-chul, Sam Okyere, Guillaume Patry, Alberto Mondi	
5	August 20, 2016	Kim So-hye, Jeon So-mi (I.O.I), Moon Se-yoon, Tei	
6	August 27, 2016	Kim Tae-woo (g.o.d), Nahyun (Sonamoo), Hyun Joo-yup	
7	September 3, 2016	Moon Se-yoon, Jeong Jun-ha, Hong Jin-young, Kim Poong	
8	September 10, 2016	Moon Se-yoon, Jeong Jun-ha, Hong Jin-young, Kim Poong	
9	September 17, 2016	Kim Shin-young, Song Jae-hee, Yang Jeong-won, Kim Kiri	
10	September 24, 2016	Lee Younbok, Henry (Super Junior-M), Zhang Yu'an, Abhishek Gupta	
11	October 1, 2016	Kim Sook, Hwang Sukjeong, Sunwoo Sun, Jang Do-yeon	
12	October 8, 2016	Kim Wonhyo & Sim Jinhae, Kang Sung Jin & Lee Hyun Young, Lee Chun-soo & Shim Hae	
13	October 15, 2016	Choi Hyun-seok, Oh Se-deuk, Chung Ho-young, Lee Won-il	
14	October 22, 2016	Kim Joo-hee, Oh Sang-jin, Han Suk-joon, Moon Ji-ae	
15	October 29, 2016	Tony An, Bada, Joon Park, Kim Sang Hyuk	
16	November 5, 2016	Wheesung, Kang Kyun-sung (Noel), Sandeul (B1A4), Alex (Clazziquai)	
17	December 1, 2016	Seo In-young, Yoon Jung-soo, Oh Nami, Cao Lu	
18	December 8, 2016	Lee Guk-joo, Solji (EXID), Son Hoyoung, Sleepy (Untouchable)	
19	December 15, 2016	Kim Ga-yeon, Kim Mi-ryeo, Narsha, Kim Soo-young	
20	December 22, 2016	Kim Kwang-kyu, Jo Woo-jong, Kim Ki-bang, Heo Kyung-hwan	
21	December 29, 2016	Oh Nami, Kim Mi-ryeo	
22	January 5, 2017	Lee Hye-jung, Park Joon-myeon, Park Soo-hong, Park So-hyun	
23	January 12, 2017	JeA (Brown Eyed Girls), Jinyoung (B1A4), Baro (B1A4), Kim Se-jeong (gugudan)	
24	January 19, 2017	Robert Holley, Julian Quintart, Tyler Rasch, Ji Sang-ryeol	
25	January 26, 2017	Kim Il-jung, Lee Jun-hyeok, Hong Ji-min, Jang Youngran	
26	February 2, 2017	Kim Jong-min, Lee Si-eon, Ye Jung-hwa, Choi Soo-young	
