= List of programs broadcast by JTBC =

This is a partial listing of programs broadcast by the South Korean cable television channel JTBC.

Key

On-air Upcoming

== Award shows ==
- Baeksang Arts Awards (2012–present)
- Golden Disc Awards (2007–present)

== Dramas ==
=== Monday–Friday ===
List of Monday to Friday dramas, showing the premiere date, finale date and timeslot
English title	Korean title	Premiere date	Finale date	Timeslot
When Women Powder Twice	여자가 두번 화장할 때	December 5, 2011	March 7, 2012	22:10
Living Among the Rich	청담동 살아요	December 5, 2011	August 3, 2012	20:05
Flower of Revenge	가시꽃	February 4, 2013	August 1, 2013	20:10
Can't Stand Anymore	더 이상은 못 참아	August 5, 2013	January 9, 2014	20:15
The Noblesse	귀부인	January 13, 2014	July 4, 2014	20:15

=== Monday–Tuesday ===
List of Monday & Tuesday dramas, showing the premiere date, finale date and timeslot
English title	Korean title	Premiere date	Finale date	Timeslot
Padam Padam	빠담빠담... 그와 그녀의 심장박동소리	December 5, 2011	February 7, 2012	20:45
Syndrome	신드롬	February 13, 2012	April 17, 2012	20:45
Happy Ending	해피 엔딩	April 23, 2012	July 16, 2012	20:45
Can We Get Married?	우리가 결혼할 수 있을까	October 29, 2012	January 1, 2013	23:00
Heartless City	무정도시	May 27, 2013	July 30, 2013	21:50
Love in Her Bag	그녀의 신화	August 5, 2013	October 8, 2013	21:50
Your Neighbor's Wife	네 이웃의 아내	October 14, 2013	December 24, 2013	21:45
Can We Fall in Love, Again?	우리가 사랑할 수 있을까	January 6, 2014	March 11, 2014	21:45
Secret Affair	밀회	March 17, 2014	May 13, 2014	21:50
Steal Heart	유나의 거리	May 19, 2014	November 11, 2014	21:50
Rain or Shine	그냥 사랑하는 사이	December 11, 2017	January 30, 2018	23:00
Welcome to Waikiki	으라차차 와이키키	February 5, 2018	April 17, 2018	23:00
Ms. Hammurabi	미스 함무라비	May 21, 2018	July 16, 2018	23:00
Life	라이프	July 23, 2018	September 11, 2018	23:00
The Beauty Inside	뷰티 인사이드	October 1, 2018	November 20, 2018	21:30
Clean with Passion for Now	일단 뜨겁게 청소하라!!	November 26, 2018	February 4, 2019	21:30
The Light in Your Eyes	눈이 부시게	February 11, 2019	March 19, 2019	21:30
Welcome to Waikiki 2	으라차차 와이키키 2	March 25, 2019	May 14, 2019	21:30
The Wind Blows	바람이 분다	May 27, 2019	July 16, 2019	21:30
At Eighteen	열여덟의 순간	July 22, 2019	September 10, 2019	21:30
Flower Crew: Joseon Marriage Agency	꽃파당: 조선혼담공작소	September 16, 2019	November 5, 2019	21:30
Chief of Staff 2	보좌관	November 11, 2019	December 10, 2019	21:30
Diary of a Prosecutor	검사내전	December 16, 2019	February 11, 2020	21:30
When the Weather Is Fine	날씨가 좋으면 찾아가겠어요	February 24, 2020	April 21, 2020	21:30
Sweet Munchies	야식남녀	May 25, 2020	June 30, 2020	21:30
The Good Detective	모범형사	July 6, 2020	August 25, 2020	21:30
18 Again	18 어게인	September 21, 2020	November 10, 2020	21:35
She Would Never Know	선배, 그 립스틱 바르지 마요	January 18, 2021	March 9, 2021	21:00
Idol: The Coup	아이돌: 더 쿠데타	November 8, 2021	December 14, 2021	23:00
The One and Only	한 사람만	December 20, 2021	February 8, 2022	23:00

=== Tuesday ===
List of Tuesday dramas, showing the premiere date, finale date and timeslot
English title	Korean title	Premiere date	Finale date	Timeslot
Schoolgirl Detectives	선암여고 탐정단	December 16, 2014	March 17, 2015 (Note: The time slot was changed to Wednesday on February 4, 2015.)	23:00
Live On	라이브온	November 17, 2020	January 12, 2021	21:30

=== Wednesday ===
List of Wednesday dramas, showing the premiere date, finale date and timeslot
English title	Korean title	Premiere date	Finale date	Timeslot
Family by Choice	조립식 가족	October 9, 2024	November 27, 2024	20:50

=== Wednesday–Thursday ===
List of Wednesday & Thursday dramas, showing the premiere date, finale date and timeslot
English title	Korean title	Premiere date	Finale date	Timeslot
Kimchi Family	발효가족	December 7, 2011	February 23, 2012	20:45
How Long I've Kissed	아내의 자격	February 29, 2012	April 19, 2012	20:45
Love Again	러브 어게인	April 25, 2012	June 14, 2012	20:45
To My Beloved	친애하는 당신에게	June 27, 2012	August 16, 2012	20:45
Mystic Pop-up Bar	쌍갑포차	May 20, 2020	June 25, 2020	21:30
Was It Love?	우리, 사랑했을까	July 8, 2020	September 2, 2020	21:30
Private Lives	사생활	October 7, 2020	November 26, 2020	21:30
Run On	런 온	December 16, 2020	February 4, 2021	21:00
Sisyphus: The Myth	시지프스: the myth	February 17, 2021	April 8, 2021	21:00
Law School	로스쿨	April 14, 2021	June 9, 2021	21:00
Monthly Magazine Home	월간 집	June 16, 2021	August 5, 2021	20:50
Reflection of You	너를 닮은 사람	October 13, 2021	December 2, 2021	22:30
Artificial City	공작도시	December 8, 2021	February 10, 2022	22:30
Thirty-Nine	서른, 아홉	February 16, 2022	March 31, 2022	22:30
Green Mothers' Club	그린마더스클럽	April 6, 2022	May 26, 2022	22:30
Insider	인사이더	June 8, 2022	July 28, 2022	22:30
The Interest of Love	사랑의 이해	December 21, 2022	February 9, 2023	22:30
The Good Bad Mother	나쁜엄마	April 26, 2023	June 8, 2023	22:30
Miraculous Brothers	기적의 형제	June 28, 2023	August 17, 2023	22:30
Destined with You	이 연애는 불가항력	August 23, 2023	October 12, 2023	22:30
Queen of Divorce	끝내주는 해결사	January 31, 2024	March 7, 2024	20:50
Frankly Speaking	비밀은 없어	May 1, 2024	June 6, 2024	20:50
My Sweet Mobster	놀아주는 여자	June 12, 2024	August 1, 2024	20:50

=== Friday–Saturday ===
List of Friday & Saturday dramas, showing the premiere date, finale date and timeslot
English title	Korean title	Premiere date	Finale date	Timeslot
More Than a Maid	하녀들	January 23, 2015	March 28, 2015	21:45
Beating Again	순정에 반하다	April 3, 2015	May 23, 2015	21:45
This Is My Love	사랑하는 은동아	May 29, 2015	July 18, 2015	20:40
Last	라스트	July 24, 2015	September 12, 2015	20:30
D-Day	디데이	September 18, 2015	November 21, 2015	20:30
Madame Antoine: The Love Therapist	마담 앙트완	January 22, 2016	March 12, 2016	20:30
My Horrible Boss	욱씨남정기	March 18, 2016	May 7, 2016	20:30
Secret Healer	마녀보감	May 13, 2016	July 16, 2016	20:30
Hello, My Twenties!	청춘시대	July 22, 2016	August 27, 2016	20:30
Fantastic	판타스틱	September 2, 2016	October 22, 2016	20:30
Listen to Love	이번 주, 아내가 바람을 핍니다	October 28, 2016	December 3, 2016	20:30
Solomon's Perjury	솔로몬의 위증	December 16, 2016	January 28, 2017	20:30
Strong Girl Bong-soon	힘쎈여자 도봉순	February 24, 2017	April 15, 2017	23:00
Man to Man	맨투맨	April 21, 2017	June 10, 2017	23:00
The Lady in Dignity	품위있는 그녀	June 16, 2017	August 19, 2017	23:00
Hello, My Twenties! 2	청춘시대 2	August 25, 2017	October 7, 2017	23:00
The Package	더 패키지	October 13, 2017	November 18, 2017	23:00
Untouchable	언터처블	November 24, 2017	January 20, 2018	23:00
Misty	미스티	February 2, 2018	March 24, 2018	23:00
Something in the Rain	밥 잘 사주는 예쁜 누나	March 30, 2018	May 19, 2018	23:00
Sketch	스케치	May 25, 2018	July 14, 2018	23:00
Gangnam Beauty	내 아이디는 강남미인	July 27, 2018	September 15, 2018	23:00
The Third Charm	제3의 매력	September 28, 2018	November 17, 2018	23:00
Sky Castle	SKY 캐슬	November 23, 2018	February 1, 2019	22:50
Legal High	리갈하이	February 8, 2019	March 30, 2019	23:00
Beautiful World	아름다운 세상	April 5, 2019	May 25, 2019	23:00
Chief of Staff	보좌관	June 14, 2019	July 13, 2019	23:00
Be Melodramatic	멜로가 체질	August 9, 2019	September 28, 2019	22:50
My Country: The New Age	나의 나라	October 4, 2019	November 23, 2019	22:50
Chocolate	초콜릿	November 29, 2019	January 18, 2020	22:50
Itaewon Class	이태원 클라쓰	January 31, 2020	March 21, 2020	22:50
The World of the Married	부부의 세계	March 27, 2020	May 16, 2020	22:50
Graceful Friends	우아한 친구들	July 10, 2020	September 5, 2020	22:50
More Than Friends	경우의 수	September 25, 2020	November 28, 2020	22:50
Hush	허쉬	December 11, 2020	February 6, 2021	22:50
Beyond Evil	괴물	February 19, 2021	April 10, 2021	23:00
Undercover	언더커버	April 23, 2021	June 12, 2021	23:00

=== Friday–Sunday ===
List of Friday to Sunday dramas, showing the premiere date, finale date and timeslot
English title	Korean title	Premiere date	Finale date	Timeslot
Reborn Rich	재벌집 막내아들	November 18, 2022	December 25, 2022	22:30

=== Friday ===
List of Friday dramas, showing the premiere date, finale date and timeslot
English title	Korean title	Premiere date	Finale date	Timeslot
The Nice Guy	착한 사나이	July 18, 2025	August 29, 2025	20:50
My Youth	마이 유스	September 5, 2025	October 17, 2025	20:50
Love Me	러브 미	December 19, 2025	January 23, 2026	20:50
Still Shining	샤이닝	March 6, 2026	April 3, 2026	20:50

=== Saturday ===
List of Saturday dramas, showing the premiere date, finale date and timeslot
English title	Korean title	Premiere date	Finale date	Timeslot
Monster	몬스터	March 31, 2012	March 31, 2012	24:00
Nevertheless	알고있지만	June 19, 2021	August 21, 2021	23:00

=== Saturday–Sunday ===
List of Saturday & Sunday dramas, showing the premiere date, finale date and timeslot
English title	Korean title	Premiere date	Finale date	Timeslot
Insu, the Queen Mother	인수대비	December 3, 2011	June 24, 2012	20:55
My Kids Give Me a Headache	무자식 상팔자	October 27, 2012	March 17, 2013	20:50
The End of the World	세계의 끝	March 16, 2013	May 5, 2013	21:55
Blooded Palace: The War of Flowers	궁중잔혹사 – 꽃들의 전쟁	March 23, 2013	September 8, 2013	20:45
The Eldest	맏이	September 14, 2013	March 16, 2014	20:45
12 Years Promise	달래 된, 장국: 12년만의 재회	March 22, 2014	June 29, 2014	20:45
Songgot: The Piercer	송곳	October 24, 2015	November 29, 2015	21:40
Lost	인간실격	September 4, 2021	October 24, 2021	22:30
Inspector Koo	구경이	October 30, 2021	December 12, 2021	22:30
Snowdrop	설강화	December 18, 2021	January 30, 2022	22:30
Forecasting Love and Weather	기상청 사람들: 사내연애 잔혹사 편	February 12, 2022	April 3, 2022	22:40
My Liberation Notes	나의 해방일지	April 9, 2022	May 29, 2022	22:30
Cleaning Up	클리닝 업	June 3, 2022	July 24, 2022	22:30
The Good Detective 2	모범형사	July 30, 2022	September 18, 2022	22:30
The Empire	디 엠파이어: 법의 제국	September 24, 2022	November 13, 2022	22:30
Agency	대행사	January 7, 2023	February 26, 2023	22:30
Divorce Attorney Shin	신성한, 이혼	March 4, 2023	April 9, 2023	22:30
Doctor Cha	닥터 차정숙	April 15, 2023	June 4, 2023	22:30
King the Land	킹더랜드	June 17, 2023	August 6, 2023	22:30
Behind Your Touch	힙하게	August 12, 2023	October 1, 2023	22:30
Strong Girl Nam-soon	힘쎈여자 강남순	October 7, 2023	November 26, 2023	22:30
Welcome to Samdal-ri	웰컴투 삼달리	December 2, 2023	January 21, 2024	22:30
Doctor Slump	닥터슬럼프	January 27, 2024	March 17, 2024	22:30
Hide	하이드	March 23, 2024	April 28, 2024	22:30
The Atypical Family	히어로는 아닙니다만	May 4, 2024	June 9, 2024	22:30
Miss Night and Day	낮과 밤이 다른 그녀	June 15, 2024	August 4, 2024	22:30
Romance in the House	가족X멜로	August 10, 2024	September 15, 2024	22:30
A Virtuous Business	정숙한 세일즈	October 12, 2024	November 17, 2024	22:30
The Tale of Lady Ok	옥씨부인전	November 30, 2024	January 26, 2025	22:30
The Art of Negotiation	협상의 기술	March 8, 2025	April 13, 2025	22:30
Heavenly Ever After	천국보다 아름다운	April 19, 2025	May 25, 2025	22:40 (Saturday); 22:30 (Sunday)
Good Boy	굿보이	May 31, 2025	July 20, 2025	22:40 (Saturday); 22:30 (Sunday)
Beyond the Bar	에스콰이어: 변호사를 꿈꾸는 변호사들	August 2, 2025	September 7, 2025	22:40 (Saturday); 22:30 (Sunday)
A Hundred Memories	백번의 추억	September 13, 2025	October 19, 2025	22:40 (Saturday); 22:30 (Sunday)
The Dream Life of Mr. Kim	서울 자가에 대기업 다니는 김 부장 이야기	October 25, 2025	November 30, 2025	22:40 (Saturday); 22:30 (Sunday)
Surely Tomorrow	경도를 기다리며	December 6, 2025	January 11, 2026	22:40 (Saturday); 22:30 (Sunday)
The Practical Guide to Love	미혼남녀의 효율적 만남	February 28, 2026	March 29, 2026	22:40 (Saturday); 22:30 (Sunday)
We Are All Trying Here	모두가 자신의 무가치함과 싸우고 있다	April 18, 2026	May 24, 2026	22:40 (Saturday); 22:30 (Sunday)
Reborn Rookie	신입사원 강회장	May 30, 2026	July 5, 2026	22:40 (Saturday); 22:30 (Sunday)
The Apartment Job	아파트	July 11, 2026	August 16, 2026	22:40 (Saturday); 22:30 (Sunday)
Flower Crew: Joseon Marriage Agency	꽃파당: 조선혼담공작소	August 22, 2026 (Re-air)	September 13, 2026	22:40 (Saturday); 22:30 (Sunday)
Salon De Nabi	날아올라라 나비	September 19, 2026	October 18, 2026	22:40 (Saturday); 22:30 (Sunday)
Final Table	파이널 테이블	October 24, 2026	—N/a	22:40 (Saturday); 22:30 (Sunday)
Sacred Jewel	신의 구슬	December 5, 2026	—N/a	22:40 (Saturday); 22:30 (Sunday)

=== Special ===
- Drama Festa (October 2, 2017 – present)

== News/current affairs programming ==
=== Current ===
Title	Premiere date
Newsroom Now	April 16, 2018
Sangam-Dong Class	November 14, 2022
After News 5	July 17, 2023
JTBC Newsroom	September 22, 2014
Lee Kyu-yeon's Spotlight	May 31, 2015
Political Desk	April 7, 2014
Scandal Supervisor	September 22, 2014
Ssulzun Live	June 7, 2021
Footage vs Footage Korea	August 12, 2021
A Week Ahead Korea	2022, based on 'Itogi Nedeli'
JTBC News Morning&	September 16, 2013

== Variety shows ==
=== Current ===
Title	Korean title	Premiere date	Season(s)
Talk Pawon 25 O'Clock	톡파원 25시	February 2, 2022	1
Love War	연애전쟁	June 23, 2026	1
Divorce Camp	이혼숙려캠프	April 4, 2024	1
Knowing Bros	아는 형님	December 5, 2015	1
Please Take Care of My Refrigerator	냉장고를 부탁해	November 17, 2014	5

=== Former ===
Title	Korean title	Premiere date	Finale date	Season(s)
100 People, 100 Songs	백인백곡 끝까지 간다	October 31, 2014	September 27, 2015	1
Actors' Association	배우반상회	January 23, 2024	May 25, 2024	1
A Divine Move	신의 한 수	August 29, 2012	October 30, 2013	1
A Man Who Satisfies 99 Women	99인의 여자를 만족시키는 남자	February 23, 2014	May 4, 2014	1
Age Doesn't Matter	내 나이가 어때서	September 1, 2015	October 13, 2015	1
Battle of Marriage	결혼전쟁	November 6, 2012	December 21, 2012	1
Battle of Tongues	썰전	February 21, 2013	March 17, 2019	1
Beauty Up	뷰티룸	October 19, 2012	January 4, 2013	1
Before It's Too Late ShalaShala	늦기 전에 어학연수 샬라샬라	February 5, 2025	April 12, 2025	1
Begin Again	비긴어게인	June 25, 2017	August 9, 2020	4
Big Star Little Star	빅 스타 리틀 스타	July 19, 2014	August 9, 2014	1
Camping Club	캠핑클럽	July 14, 2019	September 29, 2019	1
Cantabile	칸타빌레	December 4, 2011	December 19, 2012	1
Carefree Travellers	뭉쳐야 뜬다	November 19, 2016	February 9, 2019	2
A Clean Sweep	최강야구	June 6, 2022	February 23, 2026	4
Code: Secret Room	코드 - 비밀의 방	January 1, 2016	March 25, 2016	1
Come See Me	날 보러와요	October 30, 2018	January 15, 2019	1
Cook Representative	셰프 원정대 - 쿡가대표	February 17, 2016	August 10, 2016	1
Cool Kids	요즘애들	December 2, 2018	May 12, 2019	1
Crime Scene	크라임씬	May 10, 2014	July 14, 2017	3
Dating Alone	나홀로 연애중	February 1, 2015	April 18, 2015	1
Delivery Song – Mysterious Record Shop	배달가요 - 신비한 레코드샵	January 22, 2021	March 26, 2021	1
Do the Right Thing	착하게 살자	January 19, 2018	March 16, 2018	1
Duel! Paeng Bong Paeng Bong	대결! 팽봉팽봉	April 19, 2025	June 28, 2025	1
Don't be the First One!	1호가 될 순 없어	May 20, 2020	August 28, 2025	2
Extreme Tour	극한투어	September 22, 2024	November 10, 2024	1
Family Fang!	패밀리팡	January 3, 2013	January 24, 2013	1
Famous Singers and Street Judges	유명가수와 길거리 심사단	March 6, 2024	May 15, 2024	1
Flying Ari	날아라 병아리	March 22, 2026	May 10, 2026	1
Five Cranky Brothers	괴팍한 5형제	October 31, 2019	February 6, 2020	1
Foxies' Secret Trip	여우비행 인 뉴욕	November 27, 2014	December 25, 2014	1
Game of the Rooms	헌집줄게 새집다오	December 10, 2015	July 28, 2016	1
Gamsung Camping	갬성캠핑	October 13, 2020	January 8, 2021	1
Girl Spirit	걸스피릿	July 19, 2016	September 27, 2016	1
Girls on Fire	걸스 온 파이어	April 16, 2024	June 25, 2024	1
Grand Buda-guest		June 3, 2019	August 5, 2019	1
Great Marriage	대단한 시집	September 25, 2013	February 19, 2014	1
Half-Moon Friends	반달친구	April 23, 2016	July 16, 2016	1
Hello I.B.I	헬로아이비아이	October 8, 2016	November 12, 2016	1
Hidden Singer	히든 싱어	December 21, 2012	June 16, 2026	8
Hitmaker	히트메이커	May 6, 2016	May 20, 2016	1
Hot Singers	뜨거운 씽어즈	March 14, 2022	May 30, 2022	1
Hot Stuffs to Shop	남자의 그 물건	January 11, 2013	May 27, 2013	1
Hurry Up and Talk	어서 말을 해	August 13, 2019	October 22, 2019	2
Hyori's Homestay	효리네 민박	June 25, 2017	May 20, 2018	2
I Can't Do It Alone	혼자는 못 해	January 13, 2026	March 17, 2026	1
I Have Fallen For You	너에게 반했음	July 6, 2018	May 3, 2018	1
Idol Room	아이돌룸	May 12, 2018	February 11, 2020	1
iKon Picnic	교칙의반 수학여행	November 5, 2017	December 20, 2017	1
Imaginary Dating Battle	상상연애대전	December 8, 2012	February 26, 2013	1
Italy Squid House	이태리 오징어순대집	December 2, 2019	January 21, 2020	1
Kim Gook-jin's Visi the Spot	김국진의 현장박치기	August 16, 2012	May 28, 2013	1
Knowing International High School	아는 외고	February 11, 2025	March 4, 2025	1
Last Love	끝사랑	August 15, 2024	November 7, 2024	1
Let's Eat Dinner Together	한끼줍쇼	October 19, 2016	February 26, 2020	1
Let's Get It	해볼라고	February 1, 2019	April 5, 2019	1
Long Live Independence	독립만세	February 22, 2021	May 17, 2021	1
Let's Play Basketball	뭉쳐야 쏜다	February 7, 2021	July 18, 2021	1
Love of 7.7 Billion	77억의 사랑	February 10, 2020	April 27, 2020	1
Made in U	메이드 인 유	February 4, 2011	February 11, 2011	1
Manners of Taste	양식의 양식	December 1, 2019	February 9, 2020	1
Mari & Me	마리와 나	December 16, 2015	April 6, 2016	1
Match Made in Heaven		July 10, 2019	November 13, 2019	1
The Match with Doctors	닥터의 승부	December 16, 2011	August 30, 2015	1
Mimi Shop	미미샵	April 25, 2018	October 3, 2018	1
Miracle Korea	미라클 코리아	February 11, 2013	May 31, 2013	1
Mix Nine	믹스나인	October 29, 2017	January 26, 2018	1
Movieroom	방구석1열	May 4, 2018	January 23, 2022	2
Music on Top	뮤직온탑	December 8, 2011	March 14, 2012	1
Music Universe K-909	뮤직 유니버스 K-909	September 24, 2022	July 22, 2023	2
My House	우리집	February 23, 2015	May 11, 2015	1
My Mad Beauty Diary	마이 매드 뷰티 다이어리	April 26, 2018	August 30, 2018	1
My Name Is Gabriel	My name is 가브리엘	June 21, 2024	October 4, 2024	1
My Sibling's Romance	연애남매	March 1, 2024	June 14, 2024	1
Naughty Boys	신동엽 김병만의 개구쟁이	December 11, 2011	May 24, 2012	1
New Festa	뉴페스타	June 7, 2022	August 16, 2022	1
Night Goblin	밤도깨비	July 30, 2017	March 18, 2018	1
No Way Home	노 웨이 홈	February 23, 2024	May 10, 2024	1
Normal Family	가장 보통의 가족	April 25, 2020	June 27, 2020	1
The Night of Hate Comments	악플의 밤	June 21, 2019	October 11, 2019	1
Night with an Enemy	적과의 동침	September 16, 2013	November 18, 2013	1
Non-Summit	비정상회담	July 7, 2014	December 4, 2017	1
Oh! Happy Day	오! 해피데이	February 20, 2012	June 21, 2012	1
One Meal Show	한끼합쇼	July 10, 2025	August 26, 2025	1
Patti Kim Show	패티김쇼	September 29, 2012	February 3, 2013	1
Paws in Paradise	집 나가면 개호강	May 25, 2025	July 27, 2025	1
Peak Time	피크타임	February 15, 2023	April 19, 2023	1
Perfect on Paper	이론상 완벽한 남자	November 10, 2017	January 12, 2018	1
Petkage	펫키지	August 26, 2021	October 18, 2021	1
Phantom Singer	팬텀싱어	November 11, 2016	July 3, 2020	3
Project 7	프로젝트7	October 18, 2024	December 27, 2024	1
Project Proposal	비밀기획단	September 22, 2019	October 6, 2019	1
Quizz 100	백만장자 엘리베이터	November 30, 2014		1
R U Next?	알유넥스트?	June 30, 2024	September 1, 2024	1
River Odyssey	리버 오디세이	December 3, 2011	February 19, 2012	1
Review 4 Cut	리뷰네컷	September 2, 2024	September 9, 2024	1
The Road to Riches – Money Talks	돈길만 걸어요 - 정산회담	February 11, 2020	April 28, 2020	1
There Is No House for Us in Seoul	서울엔 우리집이 없다	October 14, 2020	April 21, 2021	1
Same Day Delivery, Our Home	당일배송 우리집	December 16, 2025	February 3, 2026	1
Sea of Hope	바라던 바다	June 29, 2021	September 14, 2021	1
Secret Dating	비밀연애	December 3, 2014	January 28, 2015	1
Secret Garden of Miss Koreas	미스코리아 비밀의 화원	July 14, 2013	October 27, 2013	1
Shinhwa Broadcasting	신화방송	March 17, 2012	January 19, 2014	2
Shock the Globe	쇼킹 70억	November 6, 2012	July 5, 2013	1
Shopping Family	연쇄 쇼핑가족	August 22, 2015	October 21, 2015	1
Showdown	쇼다운	March 18, 2022	May 27, 2022	1
Sing Again	싱어게인 - 무명가수전	November 16, 2020	January 6, 2026	4
Single's Inferno	솔로지옥	December 18, 2021	January 10, 2023	2
Sitcom - Royal Villa	시트콩 로얄빌라	July 15, 2013	September 9, 2013	1
Sky Muscle	위대한 운동장 - SKY 머슬	February 23, 2019	March 16, 2019	1
Solo Wars	솔로워즈	July 15, 2016	September 16, 2016	1
Stage K	스테이지 K	April 7, 2019	June 23, 2019	1
Stick Together	찰떡콤비	June 16, 2019	September 8, 2019	1
Story Hunter	스토리 헌터	December 9, 2011	February 11, 2012	1
Strangers		December 2, 2017	March 31, 2018	1
Street Alcohol Fighter	술트리트 파이터	November 11, 2021	November 17, 2022	2
Street Food Vendor	길바닥 밥장사	April 8, 2025	June 24, 2025	1
Street Messenger	말하는대로	September 21, 2016	March 8, 2017	1
Superband	슈퍼밴드	April 12, 2019	July 12, 2019	1
Surprise! Dream Project	깜.놀! 드림 프로젝트	December 4, 2011	January 21, 2012	1
Talk Hero	토크히어로	September 14, 2016	September 16, 2016	1
The Gentlemen's League	뭉쳐야 찬다	June 13, 2019	February 1, 2026	4
The Second World	두 번째 세계	August 30, 2022	November 8, 2022	1
Three Men's Real Living Info	세 남자의 저녁	December 5, 2011	March 27, 2012	1
Traveler	트래블러	February 21, 2019	April 18, 2020	2
Travelling Market	유랑마켓	February 16, 2020	August 9, 2020	1
Tribe of Hip Hop	힙합의 민족	April 1, 2016	January 17, 2017	2
Two Houses	대놓고 두집살림	October 21, 2025	December 9, 2025	1
Two Yoo Project Sugar Man	투유 프로젝트 – 슈가맨	August 19, 2015	March 6, 2020	3
Veteran	위대한배태랑	June 1, 2020	September 14, 2020	1
We Will Eat Well	잘 먹겠습니다	July 23, 2016	February 2, 2017	1
Welcome Back to School	학교 다녀오겠습니다	July 12, 2014	November 3, 2015	1
Where Is My Friend's Home	내 친구의 집은 어디인가	February 7, 2015	April 29, 2016	1
Witch Hunt	마녀사냥	August 2, 2013	December 18, 2015	1
With Boss	보스와의 동침	July 26, 2014	October 17, 2014	1
With You	님과 함께	January 27, 2014	September 26, 2017	2
Wonderful Korea	원더풀 코리아	December 9, 2011	December 24, 2011	1
Yang Se-chan's Ten	양세찬의 텐	December 21, 2016	March 30, 2017	2
Yes Man	예스맨	January 17, 2026	March 21, 2026	1

== See also ==
- List of programs broadcast by Arirang TV
- List of programs broadcast by the Korean Broadcasting System
- List of programs broadcast by MBC TV
- List of programs broadcast by Seoul Broadcasting System
- List of Shinhwa Broadcast episodes
- List of programs broadcast by tvN (South Korean TV channel)
