= The God of Music 2 =

- Genre: Mockumentary
- Country of origin: South Korea
- Original language: Korean
- No. of seasons: 1
- No. of episodes: 10

Production
- Production location: South Korea
- Camera setup: Multi-camera
- Running time: 46–48 minutes

Original release
- Network: Mnet
- Release: May 5 – July 7, 2016

The God of Music 2 (Korean: 음악의 신 2) is a South Korean mockumentary TV show.

== Cast ==
- Lee Sang-min (Roo'ra)
- Tak Jae-hoon (Country Kko Kko)
- Kim Ga-eun
- Baek Young-kwang
- Kim Ji-hyang
- Muzie
- Jinyoung (B1A4)
- Park Kyung-ri (9Muses, 9Muses A and NASTY NASTY)
- Lee Soo-min
- Kim So-hee (I.B.I and NATURE)
- Yoon Chae-kyung (Puretty, I.B.I and April)
- Lee Su-hyun
- Lee Hae-in (I.B.I)
- Sleepy
- DinDin

== C.I.V.A ==
C.I.V.A
- Origin: South Korea
- Genres: K-pop; dance-pop
- Years active: 2016
- Labels: Sony Music (Distribution)
- Members: Lee Soo-min; Kim So-hee; Yoon Chae-kyung

C.I.V.A (Korean: 씨아이브이에이) is a girl group created through The God of Music 2. So named because the group strives to be better than Diva, "so they put C instead of D there". However, the name has to be spelled out because pronouncing it as a single word sounds like a curse word in Korean.

=== Discography ===
Title	Year	Peak chart positions		Sales	Album
Title	Year	KOR Gaon	US World	Sales	Album
"Why" (feat. Miryo)	2016	—N/a	—N/a	—N/a	Non-album single
