= Julian Quintart =

Belgian-born South Korea-based television personality

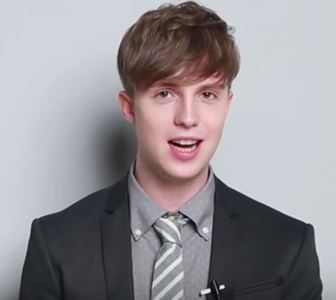
- Julian Quintart
- Born: 24 August 1987 (age 38); Sur la Heid, Belgium
- Occupations: Television personality, music producer, disk jockey, model, actor, singer
- Years active: 2006-present
- Spouse: Unknown (m. 2025)
- Website: Julian Quintart on X Julian Quintart on Instagram

Julian Quintart (born 24 August 1987) is a Belgian, living and performing in South Korea, as a television personality, record producer, disk jockey, model, actor and singer. He was a cast member in the talk show Non-Summit.

== Early life ==
Quintart arrived in South Korea, from his home in Aywaille, Belgium, when he was seventeen, as a student with Rotary Youth Exchange. He said that a camera crew was, coincidentally, at the airport when he arrived, and questioned him about being in South Korea. He immersed himself in the culture and learned more of the language. From there, he went on to appear on TV and was able to move into acting. He called it an exciting time, during which he was able to have many experiences that other foreigners could never have, such as going to North Korea, attending a training camp for the South Korean Army, making kimchi the traditional way, and cycling across South Korea. About his learning to speak Korean, in just a few years, he said, "We didn't study Korean to get a high score in school. We just felt the need to communicate clearly with Korean people, which naturally led us to learn the language with great interest."

== Career ==
=== 2006-2019 ===
He has been called a "Jack of all trades". He's been on TV, appearing in SBS Way to Eat Well and Live Well and KBS Star Golden Bell, on dramas, including Sky High, and has performed on Inkigayo. He's been in the movies Papa and My Tutor Friend 2, has held concerts, modeled, been a DJ and music producer. He was a member of the boy band Bonjour in 2006. He has been a DJ in Itaewon, where he started, years ago, with his friend and fellow DJ Yann Cavaille.

In his acting debut, in 2007, on the SBS Friday drama Sky High, he played a supporting role as Daniel, an American who grew up in New York and could speak a little Korean. In an interview with The Korea Times, he said he did not want to make his role a stereotype of foreigners living in Korea. "He (Daniel) is not typical because he can speak some Korean. I think most foreigners' roles in the dramas are like Dennis Oh and Daniel Henney, who seem very cold. But my character shows another image of foreigners, as cute and cheerful." Also, in 2007, he played another supporting role, in the film My Tutor Friend 2.

From July 2014 to June 2015, Julian took part of the Non Summit show. The show features a panel of non-Korean men, living in South Korea, who debate various topics and "Korean culture, through foreigners' eyes", in a talk show format, in Korean. Julian speaks Korean fluently.

In February 2015, Julian visited his home country and family in Belgium as part of the TV program "My Friends Home". His mother prepared some dishes for the visiting performers.

In September 2014, his musical duo, Yann & Julian, was selected to appear at Global Gathering Korea on 4 October.

On 23 May 2015, as a DJ, Julian did the opening of the Kpop Festival: Dream Concert 2015 at Seoul World Cup Stadium

In January 2016, Julian started a project with the European Community Asia, a project to help save the planet in everyday life : LOUD FOR EARTH. He asked people to send videos on how they save energy in their everyday lives. This is related to the COP 21 world meeting for climate.

In winter 2016, Julian did some volunteer work. He brought charcoal to some old and poor people with the help of some fans.

Julian participated in the radio program The QUBE with Fabien Yoon. They invited some foreigners living in South Korea to join them and asked them questions about music, history, and sports. They also got to know them better.

In December 2016, Julian received the title "Ambassadeur du Pays de Liège" in his home country of Belgium. The ceremony took place at the chocolate factory of Jean-Philippe Darcis in Verviers. There is a chocolate museum in the factory. Julian was represented by his parents but sent a video showing how he lived in South Korea.

In May 2017, Julian participated with other performers in a charity ride,500 km, from Busan to Seoul to raise money for the Purme Foundation Nexon Children's Rehabilitation Hospital. The ride was called Cycle for Life Korea. A Belgian singer from Ghent, Sioen, also took part in this event.

In July 2017, Julian appeared in a video for the Seoul tourist office

In May 2019, Julian was on the cover of his mother's cookbook of European recipes. There are also some stories about Julian, his family and some travels his parents took through Europe and Morocco and Algeria as they crossed the Sahara Desert. Julian appeared in some TV and radio shows with his mother and also his father to promote the cookbook. This cookbook is in Korean, published by Dasanbooks.

From April to June 2019, Julian was on a TV show with the Korean actor Hong Seok-cheon. Together they aimed to revitalize an area of the district of Itaewon. As part of the show, they liaised and consulted with shopkeepers and politicians to improve street lighting and decoration and held a musical show in the streets.

=== 2019-present ===
In December 2020, 19 foreigners including Julian, were named Honorary Citizens of Seoul.

In January 2022 Julian and other foreigners debuted a new show on JTBC about foreigners living in Seoul. called Talkpawon. In it, he and others visit other countries and document their experiences for the audience.

In June 2023 Julian opened NONOSHOP, a zero waste and zero meat shop in Itaewon.

== Personal life ==
Julian is known for lectures across South Korea on corporate and individual impacts on the environment. He also promotes veganism. He has held beach and Han river cleanings with his group "Volunteer Korea".

On October 11, 2025, Quintart married his non-celebrity girlfriend, a Korean woman five years younger than him.

== Filmography ==
=== Television series ===
Year	Title	Network	Notes
2006–2007	Secret Sensei	Mnet	
7 April 2007	Star Golden Bell	KBS	cameo
2007	Sky High	SBS	
23 May 2012	Korea Today	Arirang	The Beauty of Hanok According to Julian Quintart
30 May 2012	Korea Today	Arirang	Hiking in Korea, a Unique Experience
7 July 2014 – 29 June 2015	Non-Summit	JTBC	cast
2014	Hidden Singer	JTBC	cameo
8 August 2014	I Live Alone	MBC	guest in Fabien's part
30 August 2014	SNL Korea	tvN	S5 Ep.22
10 October 2014	I Live Alone	MBC	guest in Fabien's part
29 October 2014	Get It Beauty	OnStyle	guest
14 October 2014 – 8 November 2014	Off to School	JTBC	cast in High School Attached to the Education College of Inha University's part
6 November 2014	Happy Together	KBS	guest
7 November 2014	True Live Show	Story On	guest
17 January 2015	Super Junior-M Guest House	JTBC	guest with Fabien
7 February 2015 – 11 April 2015	Where Is My Friend's Home	JTBC	cast
14 February 2015	2015 Tasty Road	O'live	guest
16 February 2015 – 14 May 2015	I Can See Your Voice	Mnet	cast
23 February 2015 – 11 May 2015	My House	JTBC	MC
22 March 2015	Let's Go! Dream Team Season 2	KBS	guest
9 April 2015 – 18 April 2015	Match Made in Heaven	MBC	EP 4–5, cast
30 April 2015	A Girl Who Sees Smells	SBS	cameo
3 June 2015 – 23 June 2015	Our Neighborhood Arts and Physical Education	KBS	cast (Bicycle)
10 June 2015	Finding Genius	SBS	guest
24 June 2015	Wed Food Talk	tvN	guest
27 June 2015	Star King	SBS	EP 418, guest with his family
3 July 2015 – 31 July 2015	창업스타	SBS	EP 1–4, guest
22 October 2015 –	I Can See Your Voice 2	Mnet	cast
2 December 2015	Star King 2	SBS	EP1, guest
25 July 2016 – 16 October 2016	Real Men	MBC	cast member, Navy NCO special

=== Music videos ===
Year	Title	Artist	Notes
08/2013	Mutation (뮤테숑)	DarooStar (feat. JawSoul & D'nox)	Actor: Julian Quintart
09/2013	Request	INFINITE (인피니트)	

=== Film ===
Year	Title	Role	Notes
2007	My Tutor Friend 2	George	
2012	Papa		
2012	Miss Cherry's Love Puzzle	Sam	
