= List of Pretty Rhythm: Dear My Future episodes =

- No. of episodes: 51

Release
- Original network: TV Tokyo
- Original release: April 7, 2012 – March 30, 2013

Season chronology
- ← Previous; Pretty Rhythm: Aurora Dream Next → Pretty Rhythm: Rainbow Live

Pretty Rhythm: Dear My Future is an anime television series produced by Tatsunoko Production. It is the second season of Pretty Rhythm and a sequel to the 2011 series, Pretty Rhythm: Aurora Dream, which is based on the Japanese arcade game of the same name by Takara Tomy. The story takes place a few years after Aurora Dream and follows a budding idol, Mia Ageha, as she hopes to become a Prism Star just like the previous protagonist, Aira Harune. The series aired on TV Tokyo from April 7, 2012, to March 30, 2013, replacing Pretty Rhythm: Aurora Dream in its initial timeslot, and was succeeded by Pretty Rhythm: Rainbow Live.

The opening theme songs are "Dear My Future: Mirai no Jibun e (Dear My Future ～未来の自分へ～; lit. 'Dear My Future: To My Future Self')" by Prizmmy for episodes 1–13, "Brand New World" by Prizmmy for episodes 14–26, "Life is Just a Miracle: Ikiteiru tte Subarashii (Life is Just a Miracle ～生きてるって素晴らしい～; lit. 'Live is Just a Miracle: Being Alive is Wonderful')" by Prizmmy (the voice actresses as its characters), and "Pump It Up!" by Prizmmy. The ending theme songs are "My Transform" by Prizmmy for episodes 1–13, "Check it Love" by Puretty for episodes 14–26, "Body Rock" by Prizmmy, and "Shuwa Shuwa Baby" by Puretty. As a cross-promotion for Avex Entertainment's other groups, "Lolita, Strawberry in Summer" by Tokyo Girls' Style and "EZ Do Dance" by Dream5 was featured in episode 11, with both groups making cameos.

A live-action variety show segment titled "Pretty Rhythm Studio" appeared in every episode, hosted by MC Kensaku, the real-life members of Prizmmy, and a new set of trainees from Avex Dance Master known as Prism Mates. In the Korean dub of the series, the "Charming School at Prism Stone" (프리즘스톤과 함께하는 차밍스쿨) live-action skits aired instead of "Pretty Rhythm Studio", with the real-life members of Puretty starring in them.

== Episode list ==
=== Pretty Rhythm: Dear My Future ===
No.	Title	Original release date
1	"Hello, My Future"; Transliteration: "Harō Mai Fyūchā" (Japanese: ハローマイフューチャー)	April 7, 2012
Mia Ageha interrupts MARS' Prism Show to challenge Aira Harune. Jun Takigawa offers to let her join Pretty Top on the condition that she gets Penguin Teacher's permission. As Mia gets acquainted with Pretty Top School's trainees, Reina Miyama, Karin Shijimi, and Ayami Ōruri, she challenges Aira to a duel. Despite failing her Prism Jump, Penguin Teacher is impressed by her potential and allows her to join, awarding her and the other trainees their own Pair Charms. MC Kensaku introduces Prizmmy and each member announces her future dream. MC Kensaku also announces that the Pretty Rhythm Dream Challenge 2012, a modeling event that took place on March 30, 2012, won the Guinness World Record of having the most models on the catwalk at a single event.
2	"A Shining Crown For You"; Transliteration: "Anata ni Kirameku Kuraun o" (Japanese: あなたにきらめく王冠を)	April 14, 2012
For training, Mia, Reina, Karin, and Ayami are sent to observe MARs' shows. Dear Crown, a new store, opens next to Prism Stone's new shop at VenusFort, with its designer, Yun-su, taking interest in Aira. At MARs' show, Yun-su gives Aira a crown, while Sho gives her a Prism Stone, declaring him as his rival. Mia, who is irritated at Aira's fame despite her ditzy personality, challenges her directly on stage and performs the Prism Jump "Twinkling Future Star" for the first time. MC Kensaku has Prizmmy explain their future goals. To commemorate Prism Stone and Dear Crown's grand opening in VenusFort, Mia and Reina model outfits from the two brands.
3	"Get! My Fan Call"; Transliteration: "Getto! Mai Fan Kōru" (Japanese: ゲット！マイファンコール)	April 21, 2012
Kyoko Asechi allows Mia, Reina, Karin, and Ayami debut on the condition they receive enough Fan Calls from supporters. However, Reina, Karin, and Ayami do not feel that Mia honors their efforts, causing her to seek advice from her childhood friend Hye-in. During MARs' show, Reina, Karin, and Ayami realize that despite voting for themselves, Mia has also given each of them a Fan Call, appreciating their talents. Penguin Teacher and Yamada record and upload their reconciliation to their blog, causing thousands of Fan Calls to flood in. The four perform and officially debut as Prizmmy. Afterwards, Mia discovers Hye-in is now studying at Pretty Top School as an international student from South Korea. Mia and Karin compete against Reina and Ayami to see who can make the most Prism Stones with the Prism Stone Maker. Reina and Ayami lose and are punished to explain the plot of Dear My Future before a balloon pops.
4	"The Hearts' Revolution: Prism Act!"; Transliteration: "Hāto no Kakumei: Purizumu Akuto!" (Japanese: ハートの革命・プリズムアクト！)	April 28, 2012
Prizmmy learns about Prism Acts through Hye-in, while Karin is asked to be the group's center during their next performance. Under pressure, Karin falters during practice, causing Shi-yoon, another international student, to cheer her up. During Prizmmy's show, Karin successfully performs "Heartful Splash", "Crystal Splash", and "Fun Fun Heart Dive", earning the most Fan Calls and going through a Prism Act Tunnel. Mion performs "Shining Oasis Traveler" as a Prism Act to demonstrate what it is. Prizmmy holds a free-style dance battle, and Reina wins. The other three are punished to describe the arcade game while wearing mustaches.
5	"First Love!? My Prince"; Transliteration: "Hatsukoi!? Mai Purinsu" (Japanese: 初恋！？マイ☆プリンス)	May 5, 2012
Reina falls in love with Itsuki Harune, Aira's brother, and later meets Jae-eun, another international student from South Korea. Reina and Jae-eun become fast friends; however, Jae-eun has also fallen in love with Itsuki and wants Reina to help her write a love letter to him. Reina cannot bring herself to do so, causing Jae-eun to be upset. Aira advises her to be true to herself, allowing Reina to perform "Heart-pounding Experience", earn the most Fan Calls, and enter the Prism Act Tunnel during Prizmmy's Prism Show. Afterwards, she and Jae-eun reconcile. Mia and Reina compete to create the best outfit with MC Kensaku and the Prism Mates judging. Reina wins, and as punishment, Mia must announce new updates to the Dear My Future arcade game before a balloon pops. Reina is announced as a new playable character beginning May 10, 2012.
6	"The Note-Taking Ban Bothers Me!"; Transliteration: "Memo Memo Kinshi wa Komaru no desu!" (Japanese: メモメモ禁止は困るのです！)	May 12, 2012
After Mia forbids Ayami from taking notes, they meet Chae-kyoung, another international student from South Korea. Chae-kyoung becomes fascinated with Ayami's notes and spends the day with her. Kyoko asks Prizmmy to design their own outfits for their next show, and despite Ayami's lack of confidence, Chae-kyoung helps her design a black cat outfit, which is then made into a Surprise Prism Stone. During the show, Ayami performs "Lovely Rainbow" and "Miss Fairy Girl", earning the most Fan Calls and entering the Prism Act Tunnel. Karin and Ayami compete to create the best outfit with MC Kensaku and the Prism Mates judging. Karin wins, and as punishment, Ayami must announce new updates to the Dear My Future arcade game before a balloon pops. Surprise Prism Stones are introduced into the game.
7	"The Struggle to Become the Leader! Prizmmy's Elections"; Transliteration: "Rīdā Sōdatsu! Prizmmy Sōsenkyo" (Japanese: リーダー争奪！Prizmmy☆総選挙)	May 19, 2012
Kyoko decides that the member who receives the most Fan Calls at Prizmmy's next show will become the group's leader, and each member is forced to broadcast their daily activities on their blog. Aira helps Mia choose an outfit for her next Prism Show, but she is unable to choose a particular image, as Mia is able to wear multiple styles. During Prizmmy's Prism Show, Mia wins the highest total of Fan Calls, making her Prizmmy's leader. However, remembering Aira's advice, she decides that the team is well-balanced enough to not have a leader. Prizmmy plays a hidden box game where they must guess the item inside a box while touching it, and Mia wins. Afterwards, they introduce merchandise featuring the Pair Charms.
8	"The Last Member Hates Wasting Time!"; Transliteration: "Rasuto Menbā wa Muda ga Okirai!" (Japanese: ラストメンバーはムダがお嫌い！)	May 26, 2012
Prizmmy is entered into the Stand Up Girls event. Meanwhile, So-min, the final international student, is frustrated that Prizmmy and the other Korean students are not using their time efficiently to train. Kyoko punishes Prizmmy and the Korean students to cleaning Pretty Top School's basement as a result of Mia and So-min's argument, where they find a DVD recording of MARs at the previous Prism Queen Cup. The girls bond over their admiration of MARs, and during Prizmmy's show, So-min secretly comes to enjoy their performance despite their lack of skill. Among the documents the students uncover, Jun is horrified to discover notes on the Grateful Symphonia. Prizmmy plays a quiz game, where Mia wins. Afterwards, they tell the audience how to perform "Twinkling Future Star" in the arcade game.
9	"A Trembling Heart! A Battle Between Handsome Designers"; Transliteration: "Yureru Hāto! Ikemen Dezainā Taiketsu" (Japanese: 揺れるハート！イケメンデザイナー対決)	June 2, 2012
Kyoko decides to hold a fashion event for Prism Stone and Dear Crown, where Sho will design Prizmmy's outfits and Yun-su will design the Korean students' outfits. However, Sho is facing a slump after Aira expresses interest in modeling for Dear Crown. Mia attempts to motivate Sho by having him see Aira wearing Yun-su's design, but it makes him more frustrated. After Mia confronts him, Sho finishes his design. Aira models his design at the show, stating that she believes she is unable to meet Yun-su's expectations of being his "goddess" muse. Footage from Prizmmy's fashion show at VenusFort in Odaiba is broadcast.
10	"Mia Withdraws?! A Serious Battle with Aira"; Transliteration: "Mia Dattai!? Aira to Gachi Batoru" (Japanese: みあ脱退！？あいらとガチバトル)	June 9, 2012
Mia is furious at Aira and plans on quitting Pretty Top School. Kyoko allows her to do so on the condition she beats Aira in a Prism Show duel. The rest of Prizmmy decide that they will perform with Mia and quit together if they win. During the Prism Show, Aira performs the Prism Act "Smile Happy Girls". Mia falls during her performance, but with the help of the other members, she enters the Prism Act Tunnel. Aira wins the duel with 10584 points, but Kyoko gives Mia the freedom to choose her path. Mia decides to stay out of wanting to make the audience smile, like Aira. Prizmmy splits into two teams to play charades, with Reina and Ayami winning. The two announce a design content for the series.
11	"Heart-pounding Hot Springs Training Camp with MARs"; Transliteration: "MARs to Doki-doki Onsen Gasshuku" (Japanese: MARsとドキドキ♥温泉合宿)	June 16, 2012
Kyoko wins a trip to the hot springs and brings MARs, Prizmmy, and the Korean students with her as a training camp. Hye-in feels uneasy over how she and the Korean students have yet to debut and decides to challenge Prizmmy for the opportunity to perform at the inn's stage. Mi-sil, the president of the Korean students' agency, intervenes, and Hye-in realizes that despite their individual skills, they cannot surpass Prizmmy because they lack teamwork. MARs instead beats Prizmmy and performs on stage, where Rizumu performs the Prism Act "Aurora Memorial". MC Kensaku holds a t-shirt design competition where the members of Prizmmy must design a shirt for him. Reina wins, and the rest of the members announce that the Starting Symphonia Boots are available in the arcade game while wearing their own t-shirt designs.
12	"Stand Up! My Girls' Soul!"; Transliteration: "Sutando Appu! Mai Gāruzu Souru!" (Japanese: スタンドアップ！マイガールズソウル！)	June 23, 2012
The Stand Up Girls tournament begins, but all of Prizmmy except for Mia are worried after Mia tells the media they will be the first performance in event history to include a Prism Act in their routine. Mia urges them to be confident in their skills by observing how hardworking the Korean students are. Together, Prizmmy performs with the Prism Act "Miracle Idol Wake-up", earning the highest amount of Fan Calls and winning the Starting Symphonia Boots. Meanwhile, Yun-su and Jun become concerned about the Grateful Symphonia taking place. The Pretty Rhythm Studio holds their own Stand Up Girls tournament by playing the arcade game, with the winner earning 10 points in addition to her cumulative score. Mia wins the tournament.
13	"The Perfume that Holds the Day of the Future!"; Transliteration: "Pafyūmu Matou Unmei no Hi!" (Japanese: パフュームまとう運命の日！)	June 30, 2012
Kyoko decides to hold a celebration event for Prizmmy. Yun-su is in a slump after seeing the Starting Symphonia Boots up close, but inspired by Aira and perfume, he finishes his latest design. After Mi-sil and Vivi, a new Pair Charm, acknowledge the Korean students' skill, the girls hold a surprise debut performance after Prizmmy as Puretty. Puretty, wearing Yun-su's design and perfume, perform the Prism Act "Night Flower Fever". As per Mia's request for winning the tournament, she gets to eat a chocolate cake with chocolate molded into one of the Starting Symphonia Boots.
14	"Puretty: A Turbulent P-nation"; Transliteration: "Puretty: Haran no P-nation" (Japanese: PURETTY 波乱のP-nation)	July 7, 2012
Pretty Top School is holding P-nation, a series of nationwide concerts featuring all artists in their agency. Kyoko decides to make Puretty the closing act. Nervous, they seek advice from Serenon, who help them train through comedy routines. When So-min disapproves, Serenon shows Puretty a strong performance through the Prism Act "Manzai Princess", where Kaname appears with them. Puretty realize that they had been focusing too much instead of having fun and put on an enjoyable performance. Footage from Prizmmy meeting Puretty at their Japanese debut showcase is broadcast.
15	"Rose Heartbeat: My Secret Prince"; Transliteration: "Bara no Tokimeki: Himitsu no Ōjisama" (Japanese: バラのときめき♥ヒミツの王子様)	July 14, 2012
While Prizmmy and Puretty are assigned to include an element of surprise in their next Prism Show, Mia meets Itsuki after he finds her missing smartphone and becomes invested in making him passionate after seeing how level-headed he is. Itsuki regains interest in Prism Shows, and Prizmmy decides to include him in their next Prism Show as their element of surprise. During the show, Puretty reveals their surprise as a diamond-encrusted Dear Crown sign, and afterwards, Prizmmy performs with Itsuki appearing as a masked special guest. Mio from the Japan Street Dance Association teaches Prizmmy two hip-hop dance moves, the Popcorn and the Up-and-Down, which they integrate into the choreography for "Dear My Future (Mirai no Jibun e)". Afterwards, Prizmmy and MC Kensaku announce the upcoming Kiratto Entertainment Challenge 2012 while doing the Popcorn.
16	"Self-Study with Magical Mion!"; Transliteration: "Majikaru Mion de Jiyū Kenkyū!" (Japanese: マジカルみおんDE自由研究！)	July 21, 2012
Prizmmy and Puretty attend a live filming of Magical Mion for their self-research report assigned as summer homework. Because most of the cast are unable to arrive on time, Prizmmy is cast as the villains, while Puretty is cast as the victims. The episode is finished early, and Mion suggests Puretty perform a Prism Show to fill time. Throughout this, Hye-in asks Yun-su about the Symphonia Series and learns it leads up to a Prism Act called the Grateful Symphonia. The members of Prizmmy have a girls' talk session over lunch, where they discuss each other's annoying habits.
17	"Champion of Zoo, Shi-yoon"; Transliteration: "Dōbutsuen no Ōja, Shi-yun" (Japanese: 動物園の王者、シユン)	July 28, 2012
Prizmmy and Puretty are asked to work part-time at a local zoo for the day, which is going out of business. As they clean up the zoo, the members of Puretty continue to argue over their ideas, while Shi-yoon learns that the zoo's main attraction, the lion, has lost interest in performing and that has caused the other animals to lose morale. After Shi-yoon forces them to put aside their differences, Puretty performs a Prism Show, with Shi-yoon refreshing the lion with the Prism Jump "King of the Jungle". Puretty makes a guest appearance at the Pretty Rhythm Studio and perform "Check it Love". Afterwards, the members announce that Puretty has been added as playable characters in the arcade game beginning with season 10.
18	"Summer Vacance! Summer-colored Mermaid"; Transliteration: "Samā Bakansu! Natsuiro Māmeido" (Japanese: サマーバカンス！夏色マーメイド)	August 4, 2012
Prizmmy and Puretty are assigned to perform a Prism Show at an island resort, which will also include a synchronized swimming routine. However, Hye-in, Shi-yoon, and Jae-eun do not know how to swim, so Prizmmy teaches them. Meanwhile, So-min is reluctant to swim because of childhood trauma. With Yun-su and the other Puretty members' support, Puretty successfully performs the Prism Show, with So-min performing the Prism Jump "Pink Dolphin Venus". The Pretty Rhythm Studio's own Summer Festival takes place, with the first round being giant Jenga, which Prizmmy wins.
19	"The Summer Festival Begins! Puretty Go! Go! Go!"; Transliteration: "Samā Fesu Kaimaku! Puretty Go! Go! Go!" (Japanese: サマーフェス開幕！PURETTY Go! Go! Go!)	August 11, 2012
The first round of the Symphonia Selection Prism Summer Festival starts in Kobe, where Prizmmy and Puretty must race in giant robots and compete in several obstacles. Prizmmy and Puretty both tie in the race. However, Puretty's Prism Show earns more Fan Calls and they win the first round.
20	"The Last Note is the Scent of Passion"; Transliteration: "Rasuto Nōto wa Jōnetsu no Kaori" (Japanese: ラストノートは情熱の香り)	August 18, 2012
The second round of the Summer Festival continues on a cruise ship at Yokohama, where Prizmmy and Puretty must go on a scavenger hunt to find as many Prism Stones as they can for Sho and Yun-su to coordinate their Prism Show outfits. While Prizmmy keeps falling into traps, they manage to find only one Prism Stone, whereas Puretty accumulates a large amount. However, Yun-su is too preoccupied with his feelings for Aira, costing Puretty their victory, while Sho presents a new perfume to Prizmmy, which excites them and allows them to win the second round. Prizmmy and Puretty have a dance contest and they both tie with one point each.
21	"Fluttering Hearts, Awakening of Symphonia"; Transliteration: "Habataki no Kokoro, Shinfonia no Mezame" (Japanese: 羽ばたきの心、シンフォニアの目覚め)	August 25, 2012
The final round of the Summer Festival takes place in Nagoya, where Prizmmy and Puretty will put on a final Prism Show. Hye-in becomes unconfident and believes she has no unique traits, but after Mia reaffirms her of her positive points, Hye-in performs "Golden Star Illusion" and a Prism Act by herself during Puretty's Prism Show. Prizmmy wins Best Team, earning the Fluttering Symphonia Top, while Hye-in wins MVP, earning the Awakening Symphonia Dress. Prizmmy and Puretty's dance contest continues, and Prizmmy wins the overall competition, earning a giant Mimmy plushie.
22	"Heart Shuffle with Big Love"; Transliteration: "Biggu Rabu de Hāto o Shaffuru" (Japanese: ビッグラブでハートをシャッフル)	September 1, 2012
Prizmmy meets Yong-hwa, a popular Prism Star from Puretty's company. Yong-hwa takes interest in Reina, especially when she discovers that Itsuki and Aira have a close relationship. Prizmmy encourages her to compete against Aira for Itsuki by inviting them to their Prism Show. With assistance from Yong-hwa, Reina performs three Prism Jumps. In the end, Prizmmy discovers Itsuki and Aira are siblings, while Yong-hwa decides to recruit Itsuki as his partner. Footage of Prizmmy interviewing contestants at the 2012 Kiratto Entertainment Challenge is broadcast.
23	"Silver Screen Celebrity Story"; Transliteration: "Ginmaku Sereburitī Sutōrī" (Japanese: 銀幕セレブリティーストーリー)	September 8, 2012
Prizmmy and Puretty audition for a film project. Chae-kyoung passes the audition, but she is expected to follow her mother's footsteps in acting and forced to quit her Prism Star career. Yong-hwa helps her realize being a Prism Star is more important to her and returns for Puretty's Prism Show. Mio from the Japanese Street Dance Association teaches Prizmmy the paddabre, which they incorporate into the choreography for "Brand New World".
24	"Treasure Found! The Charms' Great Adventure!"; Transliteration: "Otakara Getto da! Chamu no Daibōken!" (Japanese: お宝ゲットだ！チャムの大冒険！)	September 15, 2012
After receiving a mysterious map, the Pair Charms lead Prizmmy and Puretty into the Prism Stone Maker in the Prism Show World to find the map's treasure. After landing in the Clothes Kingdom, the Pair Charms work together to save Prizmmy and Puretty, who have been captured by the king. Once they are freed, the girls defeat the king with their Prism Jumps and uncover a rare Prism Stone containing the Courageous Symphonia Skirt. Prizmmy hangs out with Puretty in Harajuku.
25	"Being Cheerful is No. 1! Prism Cooking"; Transliteration: "Genki ga Ichiban! Purizumu Kukkingu" (Japanese: 元気が一番！プリズム・クッキング)	September 22, 2012
Kyoko falls ill after overworking herself. Prizmmy and Puretty visit her apartment to make her food while she rests, but they end up causing a disaster. Don Bomby offers Prizmmy porridge that he made under the promise that they do not reveal that he made it. While Prizmmy and Puretty perform their Prism Shows, Kyoko learns from her mother, Kei, that her estranged father is Kintaro Asechi, a famous fashion designer who had forced her to become a Prism Star. The second part of Prizmmy showing Puretty around Harajuku is broadcast.
26	"Black and White Wedding"; Transliteration: "Shiro to Kuro no U~edingu" (Japanese: 白と黒のウェディング)	September 29, 2012
During Prizmmy and Puretty's Prism Show, Kei shows Jun two Pure Prism Stones containing the Pure White Wedding Dress and the Romantic Night Wedding Dress. She reveals to him that Kintaro Asechi chose Yun-su and Chae-kyoung's mother, Myeong-ja, and herself as his muses in order to create Prism Acts, which combine Prism Jumps with acting; however, his pursuit in creating the Grateful Symphonia, the ultimate Prism Act, has corrupted him and caused him to hurt them both. Meanwhile, Kyoko finds the notes on the Grateful Symphonia, and Don Bomby persuades her to enter Prizmmy and Puretty into a trio tournament called the Road to Symphonia. Prizmmy has a girls' talk session where they compare themselves to their animated counterparts.
27	"Shall We Dance with the New Team?"; Transliteration: "Shin Chīmu de Sharu U~i Dansu?" (Japanese: 新チームでシャル ウィ ダンス？)	October 6, 2012
Kyoko splits Prizmmy and Puretty into three trio teams for the Road to Symphonia, where they will write lyrics for their own songs and pick costume designs from Sho and Yun-su. Team A, consisting of Reina, Ayami, and Jae-eun, meet an elderly man named Hifumi Yanagi, who wants to perform a Prism Act to celebrate his 50th wedding anniversary with his wife, a former Prism Star named Yukie. Team A chooses both Sho and Yun-su's designs and performs the Prism Act "Shall We Dance?" using the two as inspiration. Afterwards, they decide to name their group Sprouts. Prizmmy announces the winner of the Kirakira Design Contest that took place on the official website in June 2012, while Mia models the winning design.
28	"Rizumu's Confession, Words of Love are..." Transliteration: "Rizumu no Kokuhaku, Ai no Kotoba wa..." (Japanese: りずむの告白 愛の言葉は......)	October 13, 2012
Rizumu reaches her 18th birthday and plans to announce her marriage to Hibiki. She asks Team B, consisting of Karin, Hye-in, and Shi-yoon, to inform Kanon, Hibiki's sister. After several attempts, Kanon reveals that Hibiki had already told her. Inspired, Team B plans their concept around the theme of gratitude and names their group, P&P. During Rizumu and Hibiki's announcement, P&P perform the Prism Act "We Love You! Thank You For Your Kiss-Kiss Love!" to ease the audience's ire and celebrate their marriage. Meanwhile, Sho is upset that P&P had chosen Yun-su's design. Prizmmy plays a Giant Gacha game, where they must coordinate a random wig from the gacha machine in 30 seconds. The Prism Mates and stylist Sei Shoko will choose the winner. Reina and Karin both have a turn.
29	"Dedicated to a Muse I Love You"; Transliteration: "Myūzu ni Sasagu I Love You" (Japanese: 女神にささぐI LOVE YOU)	October 20, 2012
Team C, consisting of Mia, So-min, and Chae-kyoung, have not completed their lyrics, but they decide to have Sho and Yun-su design their outfits first. Jun learns that Yun-su is motivated to be a designer in order to help restore hope in his mother, Myeong-ja. Meanwhile, Aira and Sho's relationship has not progressed, but after Aira's visit to Dear Crown, Yun-su realizes he is in love with her. When the designs are presented to Team C, Yun-su reveals that his design is for Aira, and he confesses his feelings for her. The second part of the Giant Gacha game takes place, with Ayami and Mia having a turn. Mia wins the competition.
30	"Halloween Outfits are a Love-Mix Concerto"; Transliteration: "Harowin Cōde wa Rabu Mikkusu Concheruto" (Japanese: ハロウィンコーデはラブミックスコンチェルト)	October 27, 2012
Yong-hwa and Itsuki will be debuting as the Prism Star duo Love-Mix through a Halloween event, featuring a concept where people can confess their feelings in costume. Reina is overwhelmed with embarrassment at the prospect of confessing to Itsuki and hides in one of Love-Mix's props; however, Love-Mix calms her and appears with her on stage. Puretty sends a video message to the Pretty Rhythm Studio from Seoul, South Korea, revealing their individual talents and training schedule.
31	"Cheer! Yeah!x2, Let Your Dreams Blossom!"; Transliteration: "Cheer! Yeah!x2 Yume o Sakasechae!" (Japanese: Cheer! Yeah!×2 夢を咲かせちゃえ！)	November 3, 2012
While writing their lyrics, Team C meet a girl named Yumemi, who asks to train as their apprentice to become a Prism Star, when in reality, she wants to be an astronomist. Mia makes a bet with her to pursue her dreams actively by challenging Aira to a duel. Team C writes their lyrics based on the concept of finding their dreams and name their group "Cosmos". Cosmos wins the duel. The members of Prizmmy have a Prism Stone decorating contest, with Deco & Deco grand prix winner Kayo Sanno as judge. Karin wins.
32	"Let the Wind Blow! Into the Prism Heart"; Transliteration: "Kaze yo Fuke! Purizumu no Hāto ni" (Japanese: 風よ吹け！プリズムのハートに)	November 10, 2012
Kyoko sends the three shuffle teams to other parts of the world to spread the popularity of Prism Shows. P&P travel to Wind Village at the request of Shiono and Mahiro, two rivals who do not get along; however, Karin, Shi-yoon, and Pretty Top intern Hiromi convince them they can also be friends. Meanwhile, through his Symphonia dress design, Don Bomby brainwashes Hye-in for her to attempt the Prism Act "Grateful Symphonia" during P&P's Prism Show. Upon discovering the Door to Symphonia leads to hell, Hye-in is rescued by her friends before she is dragged in. As P & P depart from Wind Village, Hiromi decides to stay to help Shiono and Mahiro build their Prism Star careers.
33	"Paku Paku Restaurant of Love"; Transliteration: "Koi no Paku Paku Resutoran" (Japanese: 恋のパクパクレストラン)	November 17, 2012
Sprouts encounter Ken Shiotani, whose omelette restaurant is facing closure from a decline in customers driven away from his constant arguments with his waitress and childhood friend, Kurumi. They help Shiotani realize he is in love with Kurumi and help repair their relationship with a Prism Show, performing the Prism Act "Shall We Love and Propose?". The Prism Show draws in customers, while Shiotani and Kurumi decide to get married. Footage of Prizmmy and MC Kensaku at the finals of the Kiratto Entertainment Challenge 2012 is broadcast, where they reveal the four finalists.
34	"Dance, Dance Teacher"; Transliteration: "Odore, Dansu Tīchā" (Japanese: 踊れダンスティーチャー)	November 24, 2012
Kyoko overspends Pretty Top's budget, leaving Cosmos to train at home. Mia decides to perform at her elementary school, but her first grade teacher, Sumiko Dan, rejects her request out of being embarrassed she cannot dance. After several failed attempts to teach her, Mia reminds Ms. Dan that she inspired her to work hard. Cosmos puts on a Prism Show encouraging her to have fun and not focus on being the best. Mio teaches Prizmmy how to do the Shamrock, which they incorporate into the choreography for "Body Rock". Afterwards, MC Kensaku and Prizmmy announce updates to the arcade game while doing the Shamrock.
35	"So-min's Heart-Throbbing Heartbreak"; Transliteration: "So-min no Tokimeki Hātobureiku" (Japanese: ソミンのときめきハートブレイク)	December 1, 2012
So-min learns that Yun-su is in love with Aira. Mia encourages So-min to confess to him, and they do so with a Prism Show, performing the Prism Act "Exciting Heartbeat Memorial." After learning Don Bomby brought up the Road to Symphonia to Kyoko, Jun investigates to find out his identity is fake. While Aira must choose between Sho and Yun-su's designs for MARs' outfits for the Crystal High Heel Cup, Don Bomby approaches her and brainwashes her with his design. At Pretty Top's press conference, Aira declares that MARs is withdrawing from the Crystal High Heel Cup to enter the Road to Symphonia, causing Serenon with K to do the same. Prizmmy is separated into two teams to play a claw crane game, where one person will give directions, and the other person will be managing the controls behind her while under a coat. Mia and Karin win.
36	"Maiden Contest of the Road to Symphonia"; Transliteration: "Otome no Kyōen Rōdo tu Shinfonia" (Japanese: 乙女の競演 ロードトゥシンフォニア)	December 8, 2012
The Road to Symphonia begins, and Ayami is worried about making mistakes. Kaname encourages her to confide in her friends and inspires her through the Prism Act "Super Heroine Time" during Serenon with K's performance. Ayami decides to tell Reina and Jae-eun, who reaffirm their support for each other. Together, Sprouts performs the Prism Act "One Way Road". Behind-the-scenes footage of Prizmmy performing at the Japanese Street Dance Association is broadcast.
37	"Aira's Decision"; Transliteration: "Aira no Ketsudan" (Japanese: あいらの決断)	December 15, 2012
P&P perform next with the Prism Act "Coelecanth El Dorado" for the Road to Symphonia, inspired by focusing on their own styles. Cosmos share lunches with each other and find their own tastes mesh well, inspiring the Prism Act "Amusement Lunch Park" for their Prism Show. When MARs appears, everyone discovers in horror that Aira has chosen Don Bomby's designs as their outfits and is wearing the Mysterious Symphonia Dress and Dreamy Symphonia Pumps. The four finalists from the Kiratto Entertainment Challenge 2012 perform on the show, with entries judged by Mio, Shoko Sei, and the anime's producer, Yosuke Takabayashi.
38	"Metamorphosis of Dream and Mystery"; Transliteration: "Yume to Shinpi no Metamorufōze" (Japanese: 夢と神秘のメタモルフォーゼ)	December 22, 2012
MARs performs "Que Sera Sera" and Aira enters the Door to Symphonia, performing the Prism Act "Road to Symphonia" and dazzling the audience. MARs wins, and Don Bomby reveals his true identity as Kintaro Asechi, who plans to eliminate Prism Show tournaments in order to focus on developing Prism Acts. Aira, who is fully brainwashed by the Symphonia outfits, declares that MARs will no longer be participating in the Prism Queen Cup and the three sign contracts with Kintaro's company, the Symphonia Foundation. As Kintaro takes them away, Aira returns both Sho and Yun-su's Prism Stones. Momona Aoki is announced as the grand prix winner and she is inaugurated as the newest member of Prism Mates.
39	"Captive Princess"; Transliteration: "Chinmoku no Purinsesu" (Japanese: 沈黙のプリンセス)	January 5, 2013
Kintaro announces he is holding another tournament titled the Sky High Symphonia, which is open to any Prism Star, and if any Prism Star earns more Fan Calls than MARs, then he will allow them to return to Pretty Top. However, failure to do so will result in becoming part of the Symphonia Foundation. Kei reveals that Kintaro plans to use all the Prism Stars he collects to force them into performing "Grateful Symphonia", having been possessed by the Prism Act itself. In spite of the risks, Serenon with K decide to enter but fail to rescue Aira during their Prism Act, and they are taken away by the Symphonia Foundation.
40	"Secret of the Birth of Symphonia"; Transliteration: "Shinfonia Tanjō no Himitsu" (Japanese: シンフォニア誕生の秘密)	January 12, 2013
Love-Mix performs next, but they fail and are taken away by the Symphonia Foundation. In order to investigate Kintaro, Kyoko, Jun, Yun-su, and Sho visit Myeong-ja in Korea. Mi-sil wants Puretty to stay in Korea, but Puretty is adamant about saving their friends. At Puretty's performance in the Dear Princess Arena, they perform "Shuwa Shuwa Baby" and the Prism Act "We Love Prism Shows", convincing Mi-sil to let them return. After Yun-su learns that the Symphonia series were created out of anger, he and Sho realize that in order to save Aira, they must recreate the Symphonia series. Prizmmy has a nail art contest with results judged by nail artist Riko Nakahiro, and Reina wins. MC Kensaku then announces that the winner of this tournament will be receiving a solo song on their next CD.
41	"Pretty Remake of Friendship"; Transliteration: "Yūjō no Puritī Rimeiku" (Japanese: 友情のプリティーリメイク)	January 19, 2013
Kyoko refuses to let Prizmmy and Puretty enter the Sky High Symphonia. Prizmmy throws a surprise party celebrating Pretty Top's 8th anniversary and convinces Kyoko to allow them to participate. Sho and Yun-su remake Prizmmy's Symphonia outfits, but only Mia's outfit has not changed. Nevertheless, they perform the Prism Act "Road to Symphonia" and approach Aira, but Aira wants to go further through the Symphonia. Failing to rescue her, Prizmmy loses by a slight margin and they are taken away by the Symphonia Foundation. The Pretty Rhythm Studio holds a duo tournament for Prizmmy, who are divided into two teams. Each member must draw an item they must wear while playing the game. Karin and Mia win, and they are awarded the Prism Stones for the Passionate Symphonia Dress and the Starry Sky Symphonia Dress.
42	"Go to the End of the Universe! Sky High"; Transliteration: "Uchū no Hate e Go! Sukai Hai" (Japanese: 宇宙の果てへ Go！スカイハイ)	January 26, 2013
With only Mia's hint, Puretty searches for clues in the planetarium. Sho and Yun-su remake Symphonia outfits for Puretty, but like Mia, only Hye-in's outfit hasn't changed. Nevertheless, during their Prism Show, they enter the Door to Symphonia and realize they must take Aira beyond the realm and heal her with their new outfits. As Puretty goes further, they perform the Prism Act "Sky High Symphonia", which Aira had failed to master. They win the Sky High Symphonia and free the rest of Pretty Top. Puretty sends another video message introducing shops at Myeong-dong and show off outfits they put together. Afterwards, Prizmmy announces that season 13 is beginning in the arcade game, and the Prism Stones for Passionate Symphonia Dress and Starry Sky Symphonia Dress are now available.
43	"Stand Up Star!"; Transliteration: "Tachiagaru Sutā!" (Japanese: 立ち上がるスター！)	February 2, 2013
Kintaro goes in to shock after losing the Sky High Symphonia, but he reveals that the Prism Show industry is corrupt and confesses that he rigged Kyoko's Prism Show career so that she would become the Prism Queen. Pretty Top loses all their Fan Calls and reputation, and Kyoko announces she will be retiring. Prizmmy and Puretty decide to hold a free Prism Show at a church to win back their audience. Despite a cold reception at first, Prizmmy and Puretty perform "Sky High Symphonia" together, interesting people in Prism Shows again. Prizmmy has a contest where they must design a large hair bow and the winner will have their design created. The contest is judged by Kazumi Kurata, a designer from Prism Stone. Ayami wins.
44	"Passion Revolution"; Transliteration: "Jōnetsu Reboryūshon" (Japanese: 情熱レボリューション)	February 9, 2013
Kyoko decides to complete Kintaro's dream of performing "Grateful Symphonia" to save him and the future of Prism Shows. To do so, she holds the Grateful Symphonia tournament, where the Prism Star who gets the most Fan Calls will hold the center dance position. Prizmmy and MARs compete in the first round, and during the performance, Mia's Passionate Symphonia Dress awakens and she performs the Prism Act "Passionate Symphonia", winning the most Fan Calls. After Ayami wins the previous contest, Prizmmy visits Kazumi Kurata for a design consultation. Later, Kurata gifts the bows to all the members.
45	"The Prelude of the Starry Skies"; Transliteration: "Hoshizora no Pureryūdo" (Japanese: 星空のプレリュード)	February 16, 2013
After receiving Kintaro's notes, Kyoko requests Sho and Yun-su to create the missing ending to "Grateful Symphonia." Hye-in is overcome with frustration that her Symphonia dress has not changed. Serena and Kanon choose Kaname as their center candidate and support her during their performance, allowing her to perform "Rainbow Rising". After Mi-sil confronts Puretty, the rest of Puretty announce that they will support Hye-in as their center candidate. During their performance, Hye-in's Starry Sky Symphonia Dress awakens and she performs the Prism Act "Starry Sky Symphonia", winning the most Fan Calls. Puretty sends another video message to the Pretty Rhythm Studio, which reveals their daily life and favorite juice stand in Hongdae.
46	"Aim for the Center! Rivals are Friends?"; Transliteration: "Sentā Sōdatsu! Raibaru wa Tomodachi?" (Japanese: センター争奪!ライバルは友達?)	February 23, 2013
Kyoko learns about Jun's past. Mia and Hye-in realize they cannot choose between their friendship or rivalry as they prepare for the finals of the Grateful Symphonia. As both reflect on their childhood memories, they come to the realization that they will support each other regardless. During their Prism Show, they both perform a Prism Act recalling their early friendship, ending with "Passionate Starry Sky Symphonia". Neither girl receives Fan Calls because the audience cannot choose, so Kyoko decides to have the Goddess of Prism Shows to choose one when they perform "Grateful Symphonia". Prizmmy has a tablecloth-pulling contest, where they must pull a tablecloth off a desk without causing any items to drop. Karin, Reina, and Ayami win.
47	"Mia's Selfish Unprecedented Uproar Canceled at Last Minute"; Transliteration: "Wagamama Mia Zendaimimon no Dotakyan Sōdō" (Japanese: ワガママみあ 前代未聞のドタキャン騒動)	March 2, 2013
Everyone travels to Buenos Aires to perform at the rink blessed by the Goddess of Prism Shows. However, when Mia realizes Puretty will be returning to South Korea after "Grateful Symphonia", she runs away to avoid facing the truth. While Prizmmy and Puretty search for her, they each recall the times they spent with each other. After finding Mia, Hye-in assures that they will always be friends. Prizmmy has a contest on seeing who can blow the most party horns. Karin wins. Afterwards, they announce that the Grateful Symphonia Tournament is taking place in the arcade game and the Starry Sky Symphonia Dress is offered as a prize.
48	"The Curtain Opens! Grateful Symphonia"; Transliteration: "Kaien! Gureitofuru Shinfonia" (Japanese: 開演！ グレイトフルシンフォニア)	March 9, 2013
"Grateful Symphonia" begins, with it shown worldwide in the skies. In the first scene, "Awakening Symphonia", Mia and Hye-in are led to a battle between the Devil and Angel (Serena and Kanon), with Kaname asking them to decide which one of them is correct. Mia and Hye-in decide both are wrong, and Serenon with K perform the Prism Act "Brave Venus Birthday" to honor their courage. In the second scene, "Road to Symphonia", Mia and Hye-in meet three goddess (MARs), but two knights (Sho and Yun-su) settle their duel over Aira. When Aira falls off the stage, Sho sacrifices himself to save her, allowing them to profess their love and perform "Infinite Hug Eternal". Prizmmy has a contest where the person last hanging from a bar will receive a point, and Karin wins. MC Kensaku also announces that the solo song will be performed on March 23, 2013 at Tokyo Big Sight.
49	"Tomorrow Will be Lost"; Transliteration: "Ushinawareru Ashita" (Japanese: 失われる明日)	March 16, 2013
During the third scene, "Fluttering Symphonia", Yun-su brings Mia and Hye-in to the ocean, where they are joined by Puretty. Mia and Hye-in are brought to the skies, where Prizmmy launches them into the universe. However, Kintaro intervenes. The rest of Prizmmy sacrifice themselves to allow Mia and Hye-in to push past. As the final scene begins, Mia and Hye-in approach to the Door of Symphonia, where the first person who enters will be given the center dance position. Kintaro appears, revealing that he has captured all of the Prism Stars in "Grateful Symphonia". Prizmmy will perform their own choreography for the solo song in front of five judges: the anime's producers, Yosuke Takabayashi and Miwa Takahashi, choreographer Kayo, Prism Stone's designer Kazumi Kurata, and Takara Tomy executive Shinichiro Ōba. Karin and Mia each perform first.
50	"The Future Me is No. 1!"; Transliteration: "Mirai no Watashi ga Itchibān!" (Japanese: 未来の私がいっちばーん!！)	March 23, 2013
With Mia shocked over her friends, Kintaro confronts her over how she hurt her friends in her quest to be the best, and that he will end Prism Shows. Mia and Hye-in break free, but when Kintaro closes the Door to Symphonia, Mia flings Hye-in through the doors while she stays to lead everyone to their futures, including Kintaro. Everyone around the world sends Fan Calls to Mia, allowing her to free her friends and break the Door to Symphonia to reach Hye-in. The Goddess gives both Mia and Hye-in the center position, splitting the Eternal Symphonia Crown into two. Together, all groups end with the Prism Act "Dear My Future", covering the world in flowers and helping everyone realize their dreams. Reina and Ayami each show their choreography. Mia receives 1 vote, Reina receives 3 votes, and Ayami receives 1 vote. Karin wins the overall contest and she is thus given the solo song.
51	"Dear My Future"; Transliteration: "Dia Mai Fyūchā" (Japanese: ディアマイフューチャー)	March 30, 2013
After "Grateful Symphonia", Prizmmy and Puretty spend the last two days together before Puretty returns to Korea. Meanwhile, during Rizumu and Hibiki's wedding ceremony, everyone announces their plans: Aira and Sho travel to New York to study fashion; Mion becomes Pretty Top's CEO; Serenon travel around Japan as comedians; Kaname searches for her biological parents; Yun-su and Yong-hwa travel to Europe; Kyoko and Jun get engaged. Prizmmy sees Puretty off at the airport, recalling the past year they spent together. Pretty Rhythm Studio has a closing ceremony with past footage played to Karin's solo song, "Tear Smile", along with a video message from Puretty.

=== "Charming School With Prism Stone" ===
In the South Korean dub of the series, "Pretty Rhythm Studio" was replaced by a series of live-action skits titled "Charming School With Prism Stone" (Korean: 프리즘스톤과 함께하는 차밍스쿨), which starred the members of Puretty.

No.	Title	Original release date
1	"Introduction of the Members of Puretty and the Charming School Corner"; Transliteration: "Pyuliti Membeo Mich Chaming Seukul Koneo ui Sogae" (Korean: 퓨리티 멤버 및 차밍스쿨 코너의 소개)	February 13, 2013
Puretty introduces themselves, with each member having a specific role: Hye-in is in charge of beauty, Chae-kyung is in charge of hairstyling, Shi-yoon is in charge of fashion, So-min is in charge of dance, Jae-eun is in charge of health.
