= Something About 1% (2016 TV series) =

2016 South Korean television series

- Promotional poster
- Also known as: 1% of Anything; One Percent of Anything; Something About One Percent
- Hangul: 1%의 어떤 것
- RR: 1%ui eotteon geot
- MR: 1%ŭi ŏttŏn kŏt
- Genre: Comedy; Romance
- Based on: Something About 1% by Hyun Go-woon
- Written by: Hyun Go-woon
- Directed by: Kang Cheol-woo
- Starring: Ha Seok-jin; Jeon So-min
- Country of origin: South Korea
- Original language: Korean
- No. of episodes: 16

Production
- Production location: South Korea
- Running time: 40 minutes Wednesdays to Thursdays at 21:00 (KST)
- Production companies: Godin Media; IHQ Inc.

Original release
- Network: Dramax (Note: Dramax is a cable TV channel owned by IHQ Inc., which also co-produced this drama series.)
- Release: October 5 – November 24, 2016

Related
- Something About 1% (2003)

Something About 1 Percent (Korean: 1%의 어떤 것; lit. 1% of Something) is a 2016 South Korean television series starring Ha Seok-jin and Jeon So-min. It is based on the novel of the same title, which was previously made into a 2003 television series. It was broadcast in South Korea, China, Japan and the United States. The drama was first aired on September 30, 2016 on Oksusu, a mobile broadcasting app owned by SK Telecom. The drama then was scheduled to air on Dramax on Wednesdays to Thursdays at 21:00 beginning October 5, 2016.

== Plot ==
Lee Jae-in (Ha Seok-jin) is the ruthless heir of a wealthy family who has to get married in order to inherit his grandfather's fortune. Lee Jae-in engages in a six-month contract for a pretend relationship with Kim Da-hyun (Jeon So-min) an elementary school teacher chosen for him by his grandfather, the head of the family. The teacher doesn't realize, and the heir doesn't know, that the grandfather was the person the teacher had rescued when he collapsed outside her school. So the pair get off to a rough start when the heir insists on dating and the teacher thinks he is a marriage scammer. It takes a while but 'One Percent of Anything' is a romance drama about what happens when the pair discover their pretend relationship has gotten too real.

== Cast ==
=== Main cast ===
- Ha Seok-jin as Lee Jae-in, a third generation chaebol heir who currently runs the SH hotel. He is arrogant and has a filthy mouth which brings him to clash constantly with his grandfather. He is strict and workaholic which earns him the wrath of Da-hyun, but after he falls in love with Da-hyun
- Jeon So-min as Kim Da-hyun, a simple school teacher who loves her job and is a kind lady. She unknowingly saves Jae-in's grandfather after which he includes her in his will in an attempt to teach Jae-in the morals of life, but after falls in love with Lee Jae-in.

=== Supporting cast ===
==== Jae-in's family ====
- Joo Jin-mo as Lee Gyu-chul (Jae-in's grandfather), the chairman of the prestigious SH group who wants his grandson to learn the morals of a life instead of being a workaholic
- Lee Kan-hee as Kang Se-hee (Jae-in's mother). She adopted Jae-in after his father died in an accident. She loves him as her own and is supportive of his decisions
- Lee Hae-in as Soo-jung (Jae-in's half-sister) - She often runs away from home and finds herself falling for Ji-su.
- Kim Hyung-min as Min Tae-ha (Jae-in's cousin)
- Kim Min-sang as Min Hyuk-joo (Tae-ha's father)
- Kim Si-young as Lee Soo-yeong (Tae-ha's mother)

==== People around Jae-in ====
- Kim Sun-hyuk as Park Hyung-joon
- Seo Eun-chae as Han Joo-hee

==== Da-hyun's family ====
- Lee Sang-hoon as Kim Jin-man (Da-hyun's father)
- Lee Young-sook as Jung Mi-jung (Da-hyun's mother)

==== People around Da-hyun ====
- Baek Seung-heon as Ji-su
- Im Do-yoon as Jung Hyun-jin
- Choi Sung-jae as Jung Sun-woo (Hyun-jin's half-brother)

==== SH Alpensia Hotel Staff ====
- Jo Jae-ryong as Kang Dong-suk
- Park Jin-joo as Han Yoo-kyung
- Kim Doo-hee as Choi Chang-soo

== Original soundtrack ==
=== Part 1 ===
No.	Title	Artists	Length
1.	"I Want You Bad"	Lee Hae-in, Baek Seung-heon	2:40
2.	"364 Days Of Dream"	Na Yoon Kwon	3:34
3.	"Love Therapy"	Na Yoon Kwon, Han Yeri	4:18
4.	"Nothing is Easy"	Kim So Hyun	3:41

== Ratings ==
In the table below, the blue numbers represent the lowest ratings and the red numbers represent the highest ratings.

Ep.	Title	Date	AGB Nielsen (Nationwide)
1	From Destiny to Fate: 1 Percent Chance of Love (인연에서 운명까지: 사랑 확률 1%)	October 5, 2016	—N/a
2	Match Point. I Don't Play Losing Games (매치포인트. 지는 게임은 안 합니다.)	October 6, 2016	0.529%
3	A Problematic Man; 'This is cheating, you know.' (문제적 남자; 이러는 건 반칙인데요.)	October 12, 2016	0.713%
4	Business Relationship; 'You'd Better Not Fall For Me!' (사업적 관계; 그러니까, 나한테 반하지 말아요.)	October 13, 2016	0.766%
5	Just Like Everyone Else; 'Starting To Do Things I've Never Done' (남들처럼; 한 번도 안 해본 일들의 시작)	October 19, 2016	0.624%
6	Just Like Everyone Else - Spending Time Together In Our Busy Lives (남들처럼 - 바쁜 일상의 시간을 나누다.)	October 20, 2016	0.826%
7	The Meaning of a Gift - From a Mere Memory to a Treasured One (선물의 뜻 - 기억이 추억으로 채워지는)	October 26, 2016	1.287%
8	A Confession of Sorts: "Stay here. At my house. By my side." (어떤 고백: 여기 있어. 우리 집에, 내 옆에.)	October 27, 2016	0.936%
9	Jealousy Is An Unexpected Emotion I've Never Felt Before (질투라는 건, 한 번도 느껴보지 못한 의외의 감정)	November 2, 2016	0.897%
10	Hate-Love - 'Should I Spare Them?' (미운 정: 그러니까 이 남자를 살려둬야 하는 걸까?)	November 3, 2016	0.868%
11	Do You Want to See This Though Until The End, Even Though It May Be Hard? (취중진담, 우리 힘들어도, 끝까지 가볼래?)	November 9, 2016	0.496%
12	Her Absence - It Feels Like My Heart is Going to Disappear (그녀의 부재 - 심장이 사라질 것 같은)	November 10, 2016	0.790%
13	The End of The Contract - Don't Meet A Good Person (계약의 끝 - 좋은 사람 만나지 마요)	November 16, 2016	0.848%
14	A Lie - 'Will time really heal me?' (거짓말 - 시간이 약이 될까요?)	November 17, 2016	0.751%
15	I Love You - The True Feelings That He Revealed Too Late (사랑해 - 너무 늦은 그 남자의 진심)	November 23, 2016	0.760%
16	One Percent of Luck - The Person Who Makes Me Perfect (1%의 행운 - 나를 완벽하게 하는 사람)	November 24, 2016	1.254%
Average			0.823%

Note: This drama airs on a cable channel/pay TV which normally has a relatively smaller audience compared to free-to-air TV/public broadcasters (KBS, SBS, MBC & EBS).

== Production ==
Filming began on June 6, 2016 and finished on August 16, 2016.
