= Lee Hae-in (singer) =

South Korean singer (born 1994)

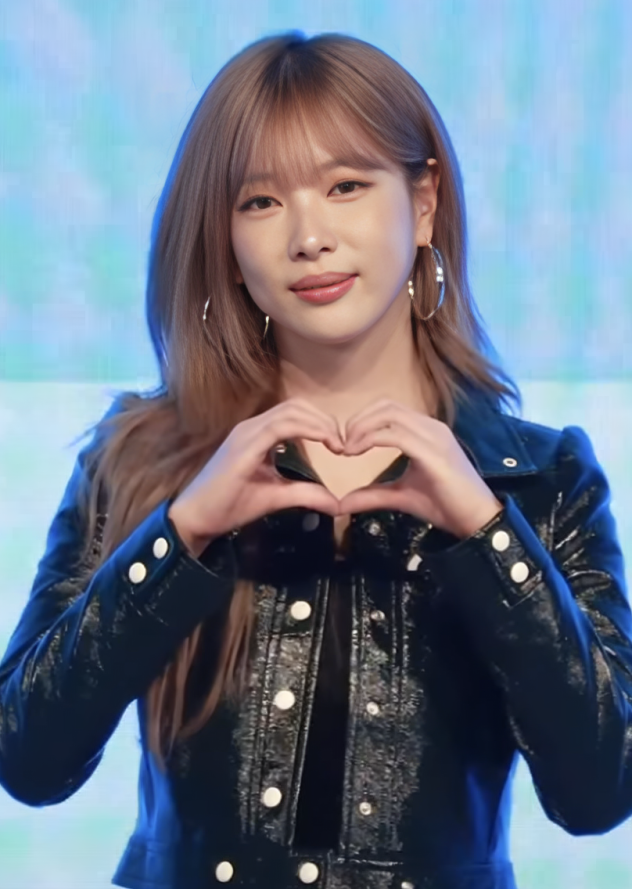
- Lee in October 2024
- Born: July 4, 1994 (age 32); Masan, South Gyeongsang Province, South Korea
- Occupations: Singer; actress; creative director
- Years active: 2016–present
- Musical career
- Genre: K-pop
- Instrument: Vocals
- Labels: Elephant Media; LOEN Entertainment; S2 Entertainment; DOD

Korean name
- Hangul: 이해인
- RR: I Haein
- MR: I Haein

Lee Hae-in (Korean: 이해인; born July 4, 1994) is a South Korean creative director, singer, lyricist and actress. She is a former member of the project group I.B.I.

She debuted as a soloist on November 17, 2020 with the release of "Santa Lullaby (We Used To Sing)".

She is also known for being a former contestant on the reality survival shows Produce 101 and Idol School.

She was the creative director of the girl group Kiss of Life. In December 2024, she signed a contract with DOD and will manage the group, Close Your Eyes.

== Career ==
=== 2016: Produce 101 and I.B.I ===
In early 2016, Lee participated in Mnet's reality show Produce 101. However, in the final episode, she was eliminated with her final rank being 17th place.

On August 18, she debuted in the project girl group I.B.I with the release of their debut digital single, "Molae Molae". The group was made up of popular eliminated Produce 101 contestants. I.B.I disbanded in late 2016 without any comebacks.

=== 2017–2019: Idol School ===
On March 26, 2017, Lee revealed that she had left HYWY Entertainment due to panic disorder.

In 2019, following the Mnet vote manipulation investigation, Lee's father alleged through her fan site that CJ ENM suggested during her audition that she sign with their subsidiary agency to ensure that she would be able to debut after elimination, and she had done so out of fear of not being accepted into Idol School. However, after being eliminated, CJ ENM did not follow up and she was unable to sign contracts with other agencies. In response, CJ ENM issued an apology. Following the news, Lee revealed on Instagram and on PD Note the poor conditions she and other contestants worked under.

=== 2020–2021: New agency and solo debut ===
On July 2, 2020, Lee revealed that she is currently preparing for her debut in the second half of 2020 under The Groove Company. On November 6, 2020, it was revealed her agency was merged with Gom Pictures and Supermoon Pictures to form Big Ocean ENM.

Lee made her official solo debut with the release of her first digital single, "Santa Lullaby (We Used To Sing)", which was released on November 27, 2020.

On December 3, 2021, it was revealed that Lee has left Big Ocean ENM after the termination of her contract, and her Twitter account would be closed subsequently on December 31.

=== 2022–present: New career, DOD ===
On May 12, 2023, it was revealed that Lee is the creative director for S2 Entertainment's newest girl group Kiss of Life, where Thai entertainer and fellow Idol School contestant Natty also would be in the group as a member. Lee expressed gratitude for being part of the project and thanks everyone for their support.

In December 20, 2024, she signed an exclusive contract with DOD.

On January 22, 2025, it was revealed that Lee has not been involved in the production for Kiss of Life since November 2024 and has since stepped down from her position following her departure from S2 Entertainment. She is currently the executive producer for Close Your Eyes.

On January 7, 2026, it was reported that Lee, along with former Warner Music Korea board member Jay Kim, founded a new K-pop agency named AMA, short for All My Anecdotes.

== Discography ==
=== Singles ===
List of singles as lead artist, showing year released and album name
| Title | Year | Album |
|---|---|---|
| "I Want You Bad" (with Baek Seung-heon) | 2016 | Something About 1% OST |
| "Permeate" (스르륵) | 2016 | Weightlifting Fairy Kim Bok-joo OST |
| "Santa Lullaby (We Used to Sing)" | 2020 | Non-album single |
| "It's Love" (사랑인거야) | 2022 | It's Beautiful Now OST |
| "Rewind" | 2022 | Exchange2 OST |
| "Lean On Me" (내게 기대) | 2022 | Mental Coach Jegal OST |

==== As a featured artist ====
List of singles as featured artist, showing year released and album name
| Title | Year | Album |
|---|---|---|
| "겨울 고백 (Jelly Christmas 2013) as Little Sister (with VIXX, Sung Si-kyung, Park Hyo-shin, Seo In-guk) | 2013 | Jelly Christmas |

== Filmography ==
=== Television shows ===
| Year | Title | Role | Ref. |
|---|---|---|---|
| 2016 | Produce 101 | Contestant | |
| 2016 | The God of Music 2 | Cast member | |
| 2017 | Idol School | Contestant | |
| 2024 | Project 7 | Director | |

=== Television series ===
| Year | Title | Role | Ref. |
|---|---|---|---|
| 2016 | Something About 1% | Soo-jung | |
| 2017 | My Secret Romance | Jang Eun-bi | |
