= Kim So-hee (singer, born 1995) =

South Korean singer (born 1995)

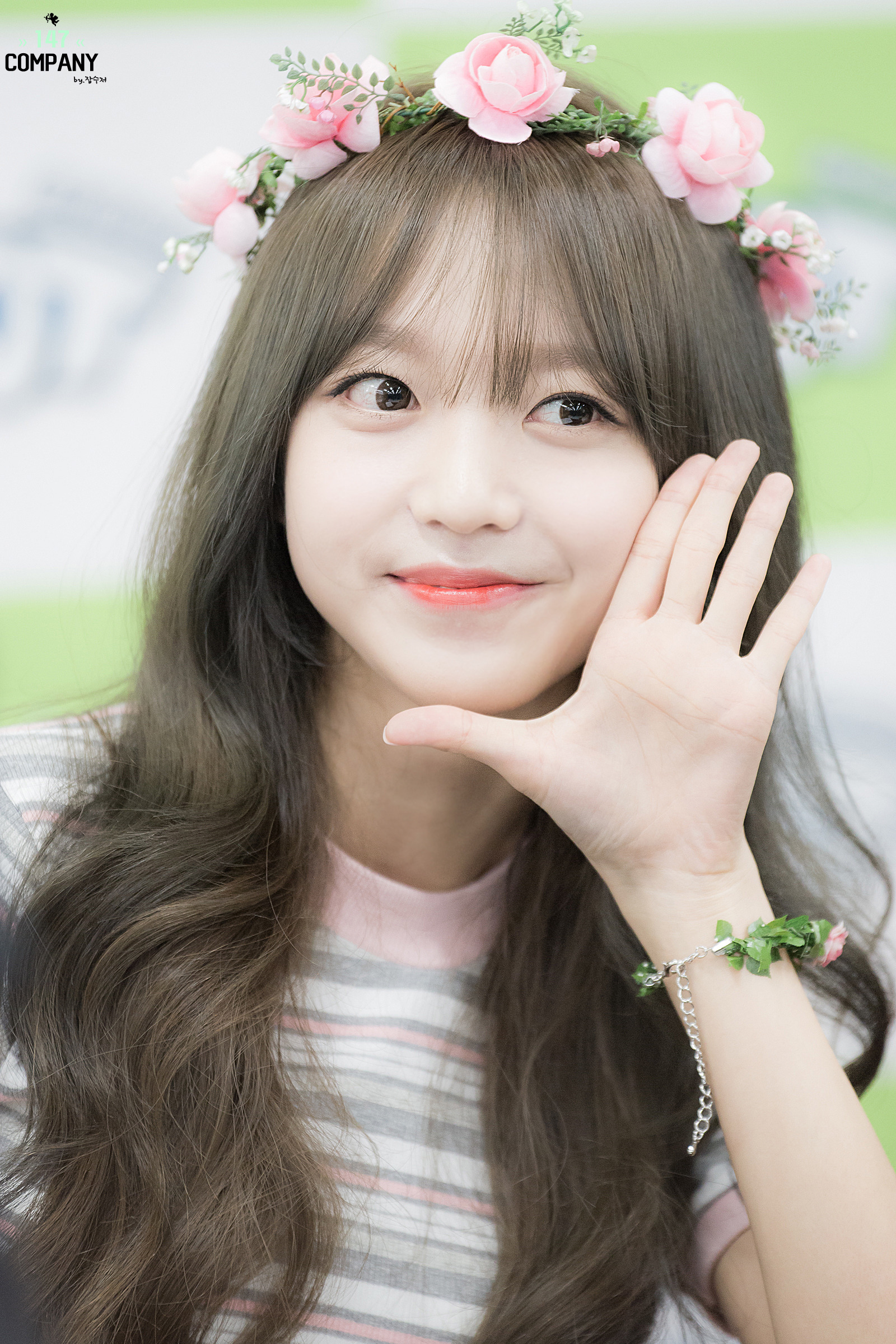
- Sohee in July 2016
- Born: Kim So-hee; January 20, 1995 (age 30); Busan, South Korea
- Occupation: Singer
- Musical career
- Genres: K-pop
- Years active: 2016–present
- Labels: n.CH; Music Works; Kakao M
- Member of: Atlantis Kitsune
- Formerly of: I.B.I; Nature

Korean name
- Hangul: 김소희
- Hanja: 金昭希
- RR: Gim Sohui
- MR: Kim Sohŭi

Kim So-hee (Korean: 김소희; born January 20, 1995) is a South Korean singer. She is known for having been a member of girl group Nature, a contestant of the first season of Produce 101 and a member of the project girl group I.B.I. Kim debuted as a soloist on November 8, 2017, with the EP The Fillette. After a two-year hiatus, Kim left Music Works and joined n.Ch Entertainment in July 2019.

== Career ==
=== 2016–2018: Produce 101 and career beginnings ===
On July 7, 2016, So-hee debuted as a member of CIVA, a project girl group formed in the Mnet mockumentary show The God of Music 2, with a remake of "Why?" by Diva.

On August 18, 2016, So-hee became part of another project girl group, IBI, which consists of eliminated contestants from Produce 101 (season 1) and was managed by Kakao M (formerly LOEN Entertainment).

On April 10, 2017, it was announced that So-hee was one of the cast members in KBS TV reality show Idol Drama Operation Team. The show invited 7 girl group members to create their very own Korean drama series by becoming accredited scriptwriters as well as acting in the series as fictional versions of themselves. The drama they were working on was called Let's Only Walk The Flower Road, an autobiographical drama. The first episode of the drama was broadcast on May 29 via Naver TV Cast, V Live and YouTube before being aired on KBS N and KBS World on June 10. It aired daily for 8 episodes until July 3. Ten days after the end of the drama series, Girls Next Door – the girl group of 7 members made their official debut on Music Bank on July 14, 2017.

On November 8, 2017, So-hee made her official debut as a soloist with extended play The Fillette and its lead single "Sobok Sobok" featuring Yezi of Fiestar.

=== 2019–present: Agency changes, Nature, Trot Girls Japan ===
On October 8, 2019, she signed an exclusive contract with n.CH Entertainment, and was announced to have joined the girl group Nature. She made her debut with the group on November 12, with the mini album NATURE World: Code A.

In December 2023, Sohee appeared as a contestant in the Japanese trot survival show TROT GIRLS JAPAN. She eventually was one of the nine finalists representing Japan and thus giving her a chance to advance forth to the follow-up survival show Korea VS Japan Trot. However, she ultimately did not join the sequel and hence dropped out of the final competition.

Four months later, on April 27, 2024, n.CH Entertainment announced that NATURE has disbanded after agreeing to terminate their contracts. Sohee was the only member to renew with the company and will continue as a singer and actress.

Kim debuted as one half of the trot duo Atlantis Kitsune on August 9, 2024.

== Influences ==
On November 8, 2017, during the interview of the showcase for her mini album The Fillette, So-hee described her admiration for senior female solo artist IU. She said, "My role model is IU. She [has a good] voice, vocal skills, and is all around good at everything, so I have been practicing with her as my role model." She continued, "I want to emulate her innocence, look in her eyes, singing abilities, and steady vocals even when she's dancing on stage."

== Discography ==
=== Extended plays ===
Title	Album details	Peak chart positions	Sales
Title	Album details	KOR	Sales
The Fillette	Released: November 8, 2017; Label: The Music Works, Genie Music; Format: CD, digital download	16	KOR: 3,764

=== Singles ===
Title	Year	Peak chart positions	Sales	Album
Title	Year	KOR	Sales	Album
"Sobok Sobok" (소복소복) (feat. Yezi of Fiestar)	2017	—	—	The Fillette
"Sweet Potato x 100" (고구마 x 100개) (with Kim Shi-hyun)	2017	—	—	Non-album single
Soundtrack appearances
"Coincidence" (우연한 일들) (with Song Yuvin)	2016	—	—	Hey Ghost, Let's Fight OST Part 3
"Navigation"	2016	—	—	Shopping King Louie OST Part 1
"Will You Love Me" (with Gilgu Bonggu (GB9))	2017	—	—	Good Manager OST Part 4
"Oh!My God!"	2017	—	—	Reunited Worlds OST Part 5
"Falling You" (with Tae-il of Block B)	2017	—	—	Meloholic OST Part 3
"Dreaming Place" (꿈꾸는 그곳)	2018	—	—	Underdog OST
"Just the Way We Love" (우리 사랑 이대로) (with Go Eun-sung)	2018	—	—	King of Mask Singer: Episode 155
"Like You" (좋다) (with So Soo-bin)	2020	—	—	Crash Landing on You OST Part 9
"—" denotes releases that did not chart or were not released in that region.

== Filmography ==
=== Television shows ===
Year	Title	Role	Note
2016	Produce 101 (season 1)	Contestant 15th	
2016	The God of Music 2	Regular cast	
2016	Hello I.B.I	Regular cast	
2017	Doing as One Pleases	Cast	
2017	Kim Min Jung's Beauty Crush	Host	
2017	Delicious Map Season 3	Host	
2017	Produce 101 (season 2)	Special Host	episode 5
2017	Idol Drama Operation Team	Regular cast	
2018	Delicious Map Season 4	Host	
2018	Weekly Beauty Claire	Host	
2018	Gourmet Idols	Host	
2018	King of Mask Singer	Contestant as Jewelry Sauna	episode 155
2018	Show Pretty	Host	
2022	Queen of Wrestling	Participant	

== Awards ==
Year	Award	Category	Result
2017	25th Korean Culture Entertainment Awards	Korean Performing Arts & Newcomer Award	Won
