= Kim Mi-ryeo =

South Korean entertainer (born 1982)

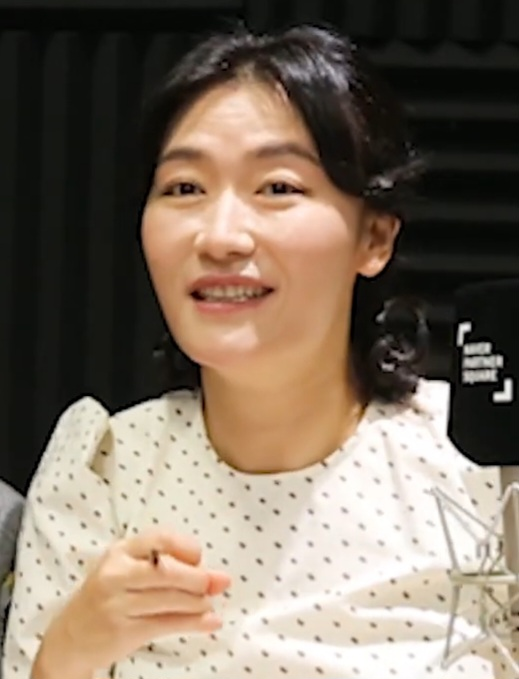
- Kim in 2020
- Born: June 13, 1982 (age 43)

Comedy career
- Medium: Television

Korean name
- Hangul: 김미려
- RR: Gim Miryeo
- MR: Kim Miryŏ

Kim Mi-ryeo (Korean: 김미려; born June 13, 1982) is a South Korean comedian and singer. She gained recognition in 2006 playing the titular madame in "Madame", a sketch that was a part of the MBC comedy program Gag Ya.

== Career ==
Kim first entered the entertainment industry after meeting Kim Tae-gyun of the comedy duo Cultwo by chance, after which she told him her aspiration to become a comedian. In 2006, she participated in the musical project Hi-Bwa alongside Cultwo, with her face covered by a helmet; at the time, her identity was not known, but on May 7, 2006, she revealed her face for the first time on the game show X-Man. The same year, she became a cast member of MBC's comedy program Gag Ya. In the sketch "Madame", she played "a vain, yet funny wife of a rich man"; the sketch is credited for popularizing the program and raising its viewer ratings. Riding off the act's popularity, she appeared in series such as the sitcom Rainbow Romance, as well as entertainment programs like Show! Music Core and the Sunday Sunday Night segment "Baby Face Club". At the end of 2006, she won Best Newcomer in the Comedy category at the MBC Entertainment Awards, and was selected as Comedian of the Year in a survey conducted by Sports Hankook. "Madame" ended on March 19, 2007. A month later, she was named Best Female Variety Performer at the 43rd Baeksang Arts Awards.

On June 11, 2007, it was announced that Kim would debut as a singer, planning to release a single in August that year. With this announcement came the launch of a reality show called Miryeo Is Frustrated, which was to depict the comedian's process of becoming a singer. During this period, she also starred in the musical Sister Soul, an adaptation of Sister Act. After performing with Koo Jun-yup in a club on August 10, 2007, she made her official singing debut during the Mnet 20's Choice Awards, on August 21.

== Filmography ==
=== Television series ===
| Year | Title | Role | Notes | Ref. |
|---|---|---|---|---|
| 2006 | Rainbow Romance | | Cameo | |
| 2007 | High Kick! | Min-jung's high school classmate | Cameo | |
| 2007–2008 | The King and I | Tansilne | | |
| 2008 | 여사부일체 | Kang Yu-mi | Main role | |
| 2010 | OB & GY | Mun-yeong | | |
| 2012 | Glass Mask | | | |
| 2012 | I Need a Fairy | Fortune teller | Cameo | |
| 2013 | I Can Hear Your Voice | Department store worker | Cameo | |
| 2015 | High Society | | Cameo | |
| 2015 | Love of Eve | Fortune teller | Cameo | |
| 2015 | The Return of Hwang Geum-bok | Manager Jin | | |
| 2018 | Yeonnam-dong 539 | Mi-ryeo | Special appearance | |
| 2020 | Kkondae Intern | | Cameo | |
| 2022 | Fanletter, Please! | | | |
