= Lee Soo-min (actress, born 1984) =

South Korean actress (born 1984)

Lee Soo-Min
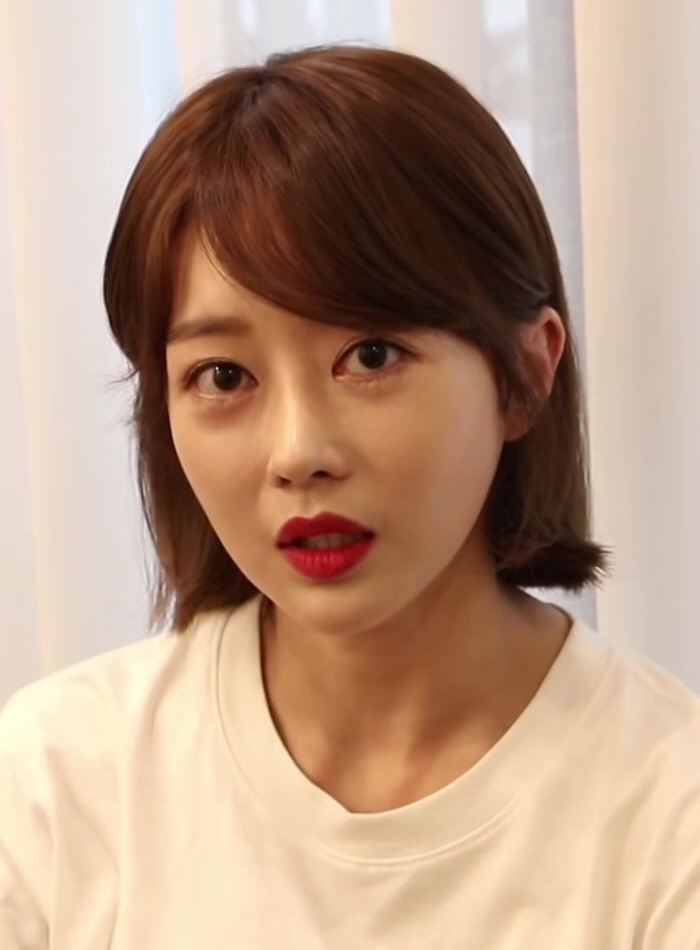
- Lee in 2016
- Born: October 5, 1984 (age 42); Seoul, South Korea
- Occupations: Actress; singer; television personality
- Years active: 2006, 2011, 2016–present
- Agent: Fly-Up Entertainment

Korean name
- Hangul: 이수민
- RR: I Sumin
- MR: I Sumin

Lee Soo-min (Korean: 이수민; born October 5, 1984) is a South Korean actress. She is best known as a cast on the TV show The God of Music 2 and Saturday Night Live Korea. She was also the leader and rapper for the mockumentary group C.I.V.A.

== Filmography ==
=== Film ===
Year	Title	Role	Notes	Ref.
TBA	4:44 Seconds		Filming	

=== Television show ===
Year	Title	Role	Notes	Ref.
2012	The God of Music	Cast		
2016	The God of Music 2	Cast		
2016	Saturday Night Live Korea	Cast	Season 8, Episodes 1–17	
2017	Singing Battle – Victory	Contestant	Episodes 14–15	
