= Nature (group) =

South Korean girl group

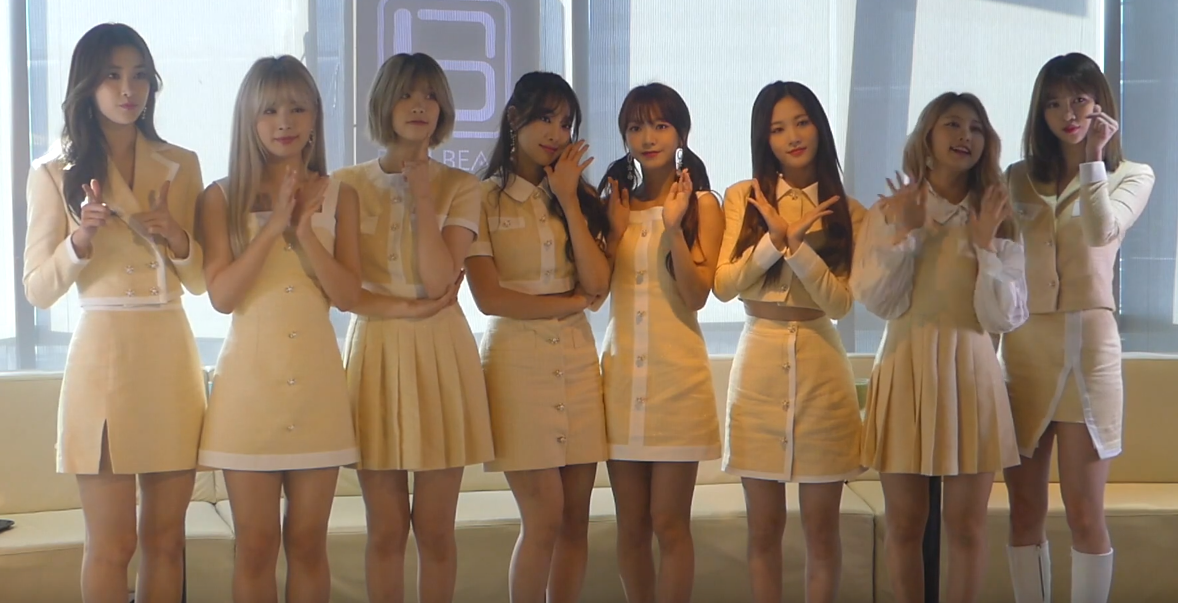
- Nature in 2020. From left to right: Uchae, Lu, Sunshine, Saebom, Sohee, Chaebin, Haru, Loha

Background information
- Origin: Seoul, South Korea
- Genres: K-pop
- Years active: 2018–2024
- Labels: n.CH; Mainbase
- Past members: Gaga; Sohee; Saebom; Aurora; Lu; Chaebin; Haru; Loha; Uchae; Sunshine
- Website: nchworld.com/page/at04

Nature (Korean: 네이처; stylized in all caps) was a South Korean girl group formed in 2018 by n.CH Entertainment. The group consisted of nine members: Sohee, Saebom, Aurora, Lu, Chaebin, Haru, Loha, Uchae, and Sunshine. Nature debuted on August 3, 2018 with the single album Girls and Flowers.

One of the group's original members, Yeolmae, departed from the group prior to its debut. In November of 2018, Loha joined as a member, followed by Kim So-hee in October of 2019. After five years of activity, Nature officially disbanded on April 27, 2024.

== History ==
=== 2018: Debut, line-up changes, and further releases ===
In June 2018, n.CH Entertainment, a South Korean talent management and television production company founded and headed by former SM Entertainment executive Jung Chang-hwan, announced that it would launch its own all-girl group, Nature, in August of that year.

Nature made their debut on August 3 with the single album Girls and Flowers and its lead single, "Allegro Cantabile." The music video featured the nine members, including former member Yeolmae who had departed from the group quietly before Nature's debut. The songs were re-recorded to only feature the current 8 members, and the music video was re-structured to only include close-ups of the current members; Yeolmae was only present in the dance choreography segments.

The lead single "Allegro Cantabile" was a remake of the opening to Nodame Cantabile, a popular anime, which had been previously recorded by Suemitsu & the Suemith. The group went on to perform the song through busking performances, as well as on various music shows including MBC TV, Music Bank, Inkigayo, Arirang TV, and Mnet. On August 24, the group released a dance practice of "Allegro Cantabile." Nature then won their first award, New Artist of the Year, on August 30 at the Soribada Best K-Music Awards. On September 3, a month after its release, the group announced through Facebook that the "Allegro Cantabile" music video had reached over 2 million views on YouTube.

In the end of August, Nature began the Pop Cover Project, a series where the girls vocally covered popular pop songs and performed dance sequences to them. The project ultimately consisted of five covers. The first video was released on August 28, a cover of "Walk Like An Egyptian" by The Bangles. The second video was released on September 8, a cover "My Sharona" by The Knack. The third video was released on September 13, a cover of "Shut Up and Let Me Go" by The Ting Tings. The fourth video was released on September 17, a cover of "Rhythm Nation" by Janet Jackson. The last video was released on September 20, a cover of "Kiss" by Prince.

On November 4, a new member named Loha was introduced on V Live as part of the group. The next day, the group began teasing their upcoming second single album, Some & Love, which was released with the lead single "Some (You'll Be Mine)" on November 22. A performance version of the music video was released on December 3.

=== 2019–2020: I'm So Pretty, line up changes, Nature World: Code A, Japanese debut and Nature World: Code M ===
On January 15, Nature released a music video for the B-side track "Dream About You" from their second single, Some & Love. The video featured the group donning blue tutus in a dream-like environment and was the first time the group incorporated an object into their choreography: a magic star wand. A performance version of the music video was released on January 25.

On June 24, it was confirmed that Nature would make their comeback on July 10 with their first mini-album, I'm So Pretty. Member Gaga was not involved due her hiatus being undertaken in order to focus on her studies. The music video for I'm So Pretty was released on July 10. A performance version of the music video was released on July 24.

On October 8, former Produce 101 contestant and soloist Kim So-hee was introduced as a new member following her signing with n.CH Entertainment. It was also confirmed that Gaga had fully departed from the group to focus on her studies. n.CH Entertainment additionally confirmed that the group was preparing for a comeback in November. It was later confirmed that the group would make their comeback on November 12 with their second mini-album Nature World: Code A; member Aurora would not be involved due to her participation in the third season of the Chinese audition show Idol Producer. The music video for the title track "Oopsie (My Bad)" was released on November 12.

Nature made their Japanese debut on February 12, 2020 after having signed with Pony Canyon; their first release was a Japanese version of "I'm So Pretty".

On June 1, Nature was confirmed to make their comeback on June 17 with their third single album Nature World: Code M. Nature remained seven-member of the group, as Loha went on hiatus for health reasons and Aurora was still in China. On June 15, ahead of the single album's release, it was announced that Sunshine would not be a part of upcoming promotions due to a leg injury, leading Nature to be promoted as a six-member group. On June 17, Sunshine attended the single album's showcase.

=== 2022–2024: Nature World: Code W and disbandment ===
On January 13, 2022, through their mockumentary series, NATURE Can't Go Down Like This, Nature was revealed to be working on the upcoming special album Rica Rica, scheduled for released on January 24; it marked their first release in a year and six months. On January 21, n.CH Entertainment confirmed that the choreography of the title track would be inspired by the Ivory Coast's Jaouli dance. The special album was released digitally on January 24. Only seven members were featured in the music video, as Loha was on hiatus due to a leg injury; however, she still participated in the album's recording and joined in later promotions. Sunshine remained absent for the rest of Nature's career.

On October 17, n.CH announced that the group would release their third mini-album, NATURE World: Code W, on November 2. On October 31, n.CH announced the mini-album would be postponed to November 6 due to the aftermath of Seoul Halloween crowd crush. The album consisted of five tracks, including the lead single "Limbo" and the previously released "Rica Rica." Lu did not participate in promotions due to health issues.

In December 2023, Nature's contract with Japanese label Pony Canyon was terminated, with their Japanese website and mailing service also being terminated. Their Japanese website and mailing services officially shut down on December 27, 2023. Nature disbanded on April 27, 2024.

== Members ==
- Sohee (소희)
- Saebom (새봄)
- Aurora (오로라)
- Chaebin (채빈)
- Haru (하루)
- Loha (로하)
- Uchae (유채)
- Sunshine (선샤인)
- Lu (루)
- Gaga (가가)

== Discography ==
=== Extended plays ===
Title	Album details	Peak chart positions	Sales
Title	Album details	KOR	Sales
I'm So Pretty	Released: July 10, 2019; Label: n.CH Entertainment, Stone Music Entertainment; Formats: CD, digital download; Track listing: 1. "I'm So Pretty" (내가 좀 예뻐; naega jom yeppeo; lit: I'm Pretty); 2. "Shut Up!"; 3. "Race" (달리기; dalligi; lit: Running); 4. "I Wish" (행운을 빌어요; haeng-uneul bireoyo; lit: Good Luck); 5. "A Little Star"	13	KOR: 7,951
Nature World: Code A	Released: November 12, 2019; Label: n.CH Entertainment, Stone Music Entertainment; Formats: CD, digital download; Track listing: 1. "Oopsie (My Bad)"; 2. "Bing Bing" (빙빙; lit: Round and Round); 3. "What's Up"; 4. "Drinkin'"; 5. "My Sun, My Moon, My Star" (해달별; hae-dal-byeol; lit: Sun, Moon, Star)	9	KOR: 12,335
Nature World: Code W	Released: November 6, 2022; Label: n.CH Entertainment, Stone Music Entertainment; Formats: CD, digital download; Track listing: 1. "Limbo" (넘어와; lit: Come Over); 2. "I'm Done" (덤덤해; lit: Calm); 3. "You Right" (인정; lit: Acknowledged); 4. "Rica Rica"; 5. "Rainbow"	46	KOR: 3,466

=== Single albums ===
Title	Album details	Peak chart positions	Sales
Title	Album details	KOR	Sales
Girls and Flowers (기분 좋아)	Released: August 3, 2018; Label: n.CH Entertainment, Stone Music Entertainment; Formats: CD, digital download; Track listing: 1. "Girls and Flowers" (기분 좋아; gibun joha; lit: Good Mood); 2. "Allegro Cantabile" (너의 곁으로; neoui gyeoteuro; lit: By Your Side); 3. "Girls and Flowers" (Inst.); 4. "Allegro Cantabile" (Inst.)	34	KOR: 1,041
Some & Love (썸 & 러브)	Released: November 22, 2018; Label: n.CH Entertainment, Stone Music Entertainment; Formats: CD, digital download; Track listing: 1. "Some (You'll Be Mine)" (썸; sseom; lit: Something); 2. "Dream About U" (꿈꿨어; kkumkkwosseo; lit: I Was Dreaming); 3. "La Historia" (별자리; byeoljari; lit: Constellation)	39	KOR: 1,121
Nature World: Code M	Released: June 17, 2020; Label: n.CH Entertainment, Stone Music Entertainment; Formats: CD, digital download; Track listing: 1. "Girls" (어린애; eorin-ae; lit: Child); 2. "Dive"; 3. "B.B.B (Never Say Good-Bye)"	22	KOR: 7,272
Rica Rica	Released: January 24, 2022; Label: n.CH Entertainment, Stone Music Entertainment; Formats: Digital download; Track listing: 1. "Rica Rica"; 2. "Dear Leaf" (버팀목; beotimmog; lit: Crutch)	—	—N/a

=== Singles ===
Title	Year	Peak chart positions		Sales (Note: Sales figures for tracks are based on digital downloads, except noted.)	Album
Title	Year	KOR	JPN	Sales	Album
"Allegro Cantabile" (기분 좋아)	2018	—	—	—N/a	Girls and Flowers
"Some (You'll Be Mine)" (썸)	2018	—	—	—N/a	Some & Love
"Dream About U" (꿈꿨어)	2019	—	—	—N/a	Some & Love
"I'm So Pretty" (내가 좀 예뻐) (Note: "I'm So Pretty (Japanese ver.)" was released on February 12, 2020 as Nature's first Japanese single.)	2019	— (Note: "I'm So Pretty" did not enter the Gaon Digital Chart, but appeared at number 91 on BGM component chart.)	21	JPN: 3,601(Phy.)	I'm So Pretty
"Oopsie (My Bad)"	2019	— (Note: "Oopsie (My Bad)" did not enter the Gaon Digital Chart, but appeared at number 81 on BGM component chart.)	—	—N/a	Nature World: Code A
"Girls" (어린애)	2020	—	—	—N/a	Nature World: Code M
"Rica Rica"	2022	— (Note: "Rica Rica" did not enter the Gaon Digital Chart, but appeared at number 89 on Download component chart.)	—	—N/a	Rica Rica
"Starry Night"	2022	— (Note: "Starry Night" did not enter the Gaon Digital Chart, but appeared at number 83 on Download component chart.)	—	—N/a	Trip: Tape #02
"Limbo!" (넘어와)	2022	— (Note: "Limbo!" did not enter the Circle Digital Chart, but appeared at number 79 on Download component chart.)	—	—N/a	Nature World: Code W
"—" denotes releases that did not chart or were not released in that region.

=== OSTs ===
Title	Year	Album
"Hey Jude"	2019	Spring Turns to Spring
"Oh My Gosh" (소녀의 세계)	2020	The World of My 17
"Delivery" or "Closer to You"	2021	Delivery
"Fly High"	2023	Sound Candy

== Videography ==
=== Music videos ===
Title	Year	Director	Ref.
"Allegro Cantabile"	2018	Hong Won-Ki (Zanybros)	
"Some (You'll Be Mine)"	2018	Vikings League	
"Dream About U"	2019	Hong Won-Ki (Zanybros)	
"Oopsie (My Bad)"	2019	Vishop (Vikings League)	
"I'm So Pretty (Japanese ver.)"	2020	Vishop (Vikings League)	
"Oh my gosh"	2020	Unknown	
"Girls"	2020	Minjun Lee, Hayoung Lee (MOSWANTD)	
"Girls (Uncensored Ver.)"	2020	Minjun Lee, Hayoung Lee (MOSWANTD)	
"Rica Rica"	2022	Unknown	
"Limbo!"	2022	Unknown	

== Filmography ==
=== Reality shows ===
Year	Title	Note(s)	Ref.
2019	Nature's Natural Reality - We'll Make You Feel Better	Gaga is absent	
2020	Nature LeaFresh	Aurora is absent	
2022	Nature Can't Go Down Like This	Sunshine is absent	

== Awards and nominations ==
=== Asia Artist Awards ===
Year	Nominee / work	Award	Result
2021	Nature	Female Idol Group Popularity Award	Nominated

=== Genie Music Awards ===
Year	Nominee / work	Award	Result
2019	Nature	The Top Artist	Nominated
2019	Nature	The Female New Artist	Nominated
2019	Nature	Genie Music Popularity Award	Nominated
2019	Nature	Global Popularity Award	Nominated

=== Mnet Asian Music Awards ===
Year	Nominee / work	Award	Result
2018	Nature	Best New Female Artist	Nominated
2018	Nature	Artist of the Year	Nominated

=== Soribada Best K-Music Awards ===
Year	Nominee / work	Award	Result
2018	Nature	New Artist of the Year	Won
2019	Nature	Bonsang Award	Nominated
2019	Nature	Music Star Award	Won
2019	Nature	Popularity Award (Female)	Nominated
2020	Nature	New K-wave Rising Star Award	Won
