= Sur la Heid =

Human settlement in Aywaille, Belgium

- Hamlet
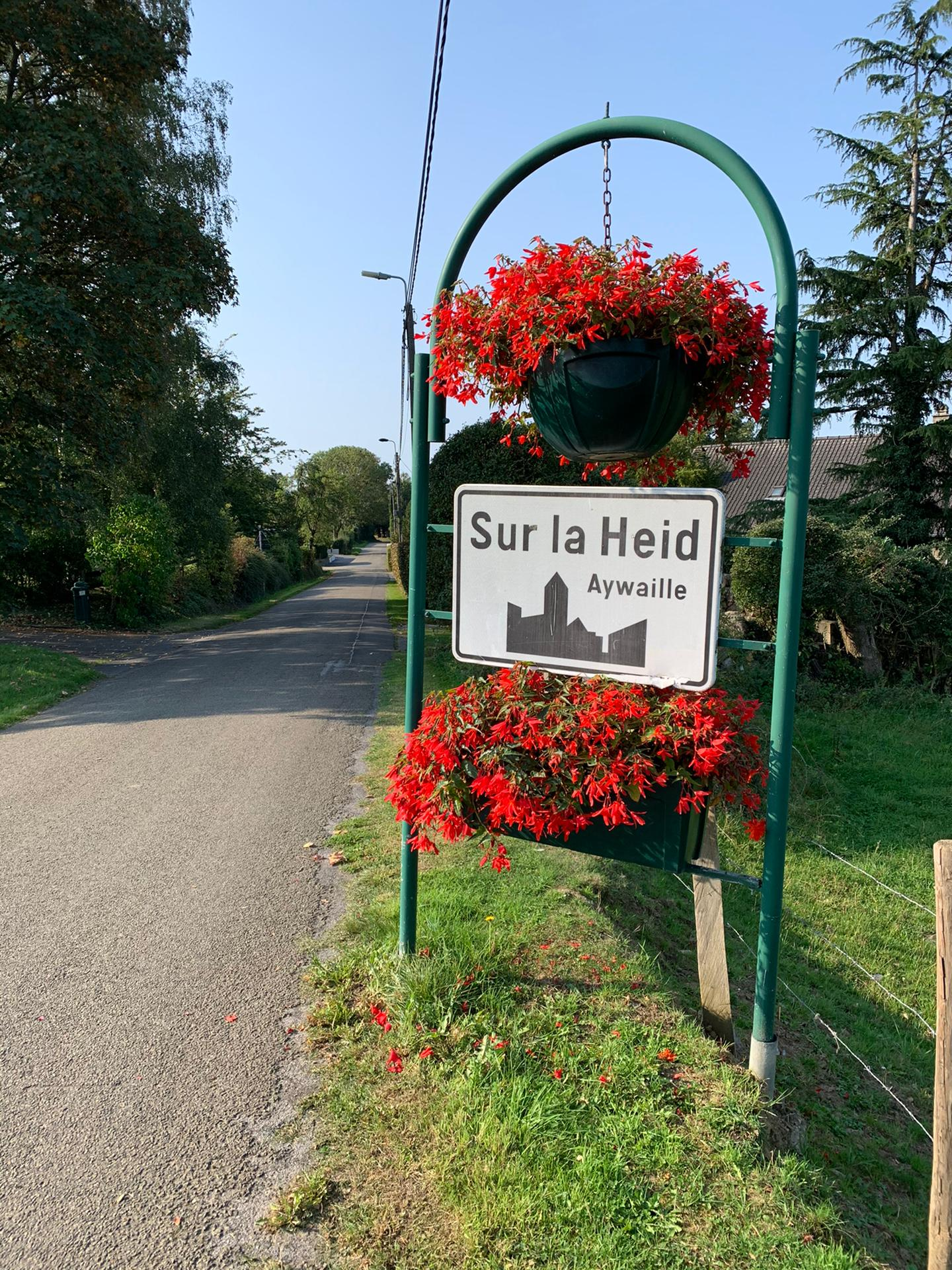
- Picture of the entrance sign

- Location in Belgium
- Coordinates: 50°28′52″N 5°41′19″E
- Country: Belgium
- Region: Wallonia
- Province: Liège
- Municipality: Aywaille
- Postal code: 4920

Sur la Heid is a hamlet of Wallonia in the municipality and district of Aywaille, located in the province of Liège, Belgium.

== Local area ==
Sur la Heid is in the Wallonia region of Belgium. It is located above the Heid des Gattes nature reserve, and overlooks the village of Aywaille and the Amblève river.

Sur la Heid is near the bike climb La Redoute, famous from the cycling race Liège–Bastogne–Liège. Many cyclists use the crossroads in the hamlet.

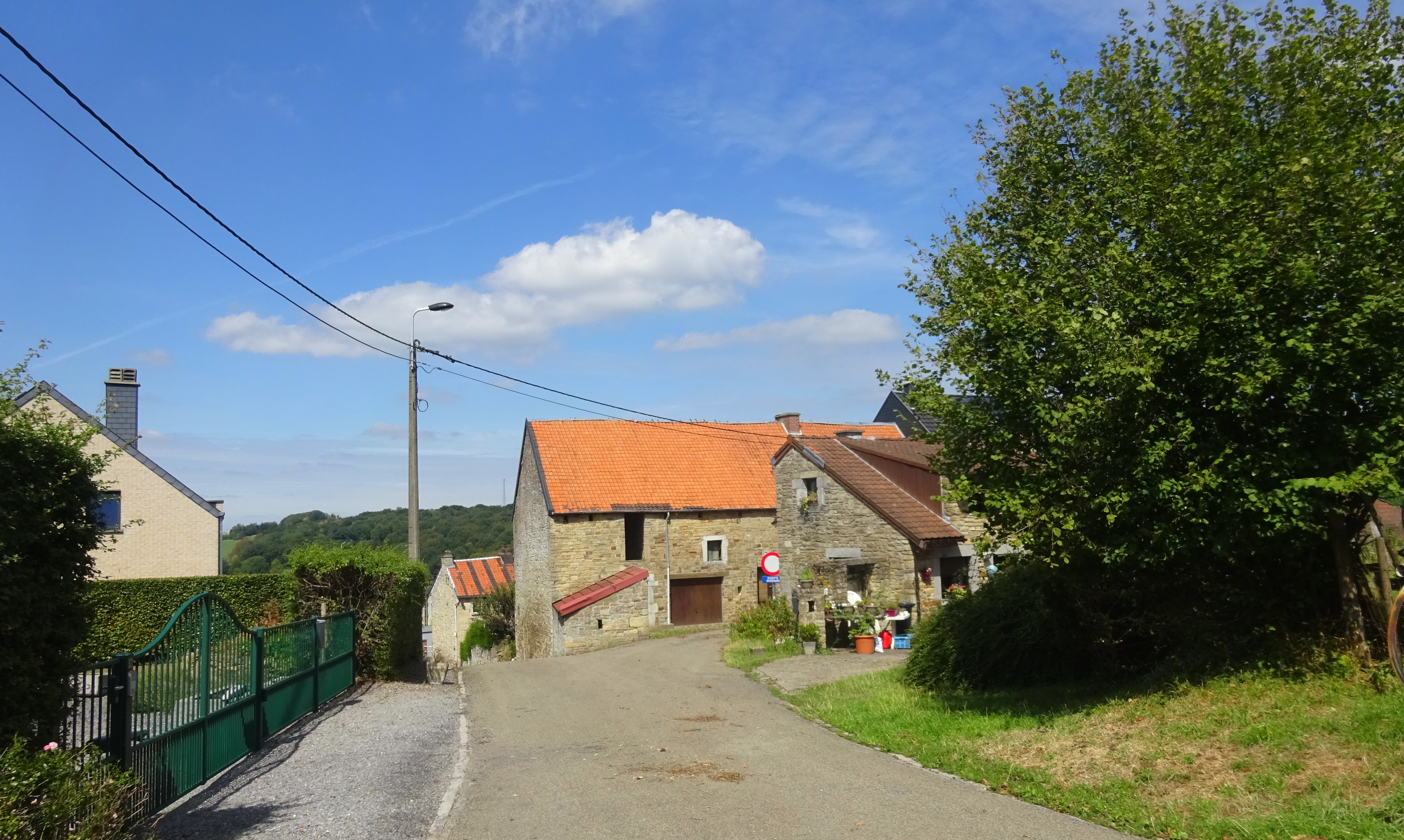

== Economy ==
Since 2004, the Gite Cocoon cottage has hosted tourists and travelers from all over the world.

The beer Elfique originated and was brewed in the hamlet from 2005 until 2018.

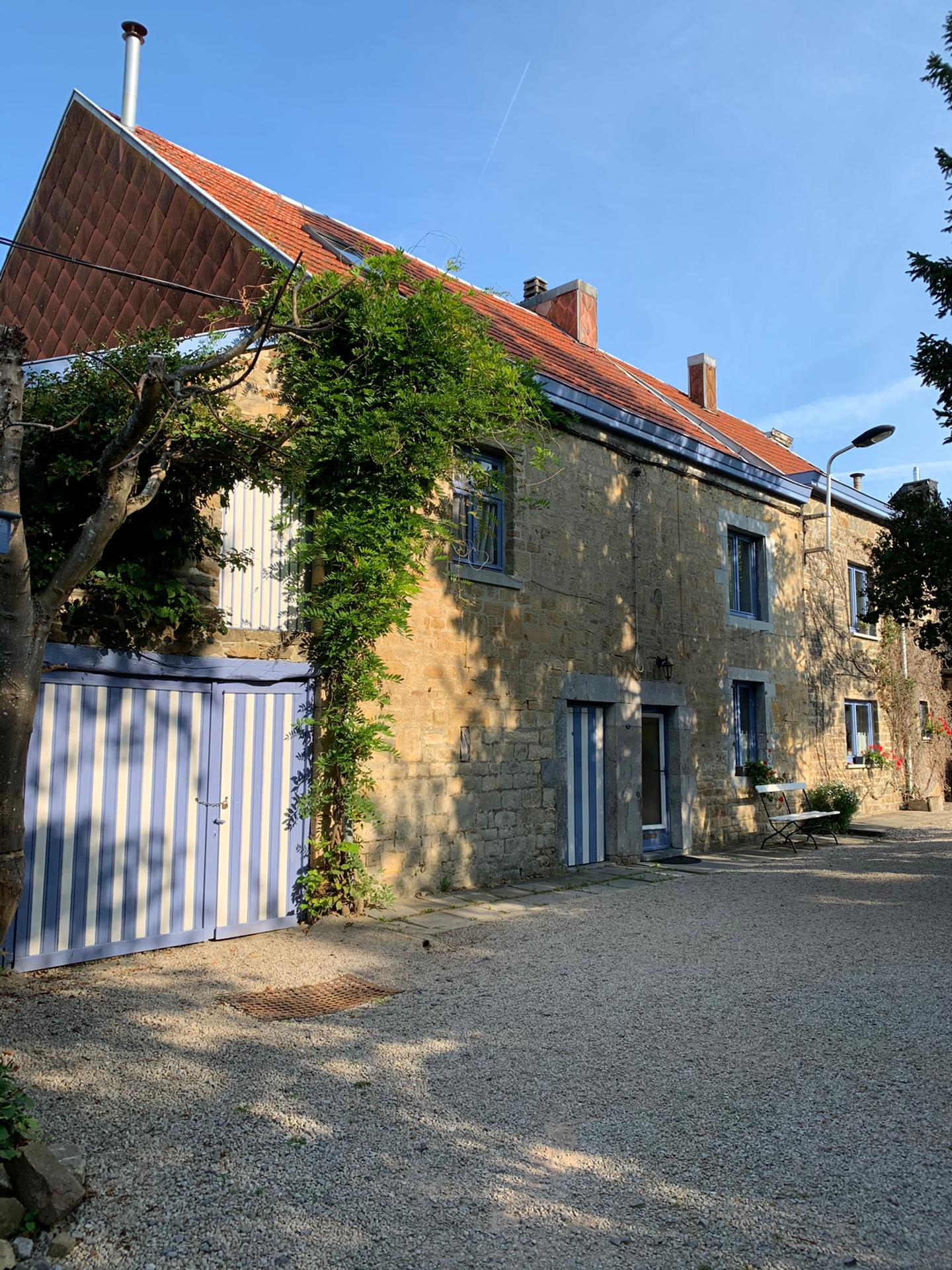
Photo du Gite Cocoon
