= My House (2015 TV program) =

- Starring: Lee Sang-min; Lee Ji-ae; Julian Quintart; Kim Ye-won
- Country of origin: South Korea
- Original language: Korean
- No. of seasons: 1
- No. of episodes: 11

Production
- Production location: South Korea
- Running time: 60 minutes

Original release
- Network: JTBC
- Release: February 23 – May 11, 2015

My House (Korean: 우리집) is a 2015 South Korean television program starring Lee Sang-min, Lee Ji-ae, Julian Quintart and Kim Ye-won. It airs on JTBC on Tuesday at 0:30 beginning February 23, 2015.

== Cast ==
- Lee Sang-min
- Lee Ji-ae
- Julian Quintart
- Kim Ye-won
