= I.B.I (group) =

South Korean girl group

- Origin: Seoul, South Korea
- Genres: K-pop
- Years active: 2016
- Labels: LOEN
- Past members: Lee Hae-in; Kim So-hee; Yoon Chae-kyung; Lee Su-hyun; Han Hye-ri

I.B.I (Korean: 아이비아이; also stylized as IBI) was a South Korean girl group consisting of five members who previously participated in Mnet's 2016 survival show Produce 101. The group formed and debuted under LOEN Entertainment in 2016 with the single "Molae Molae" (몰래몰래).

The name I.B.I comes from the Korean phrase il-ban-in (일반인), meaning "normal people", but also stands for "I Believe It". The group promotes under LOEN Entertainment, while the members of I.B.I remain under their respective agencies.

== History ==
=== Pre-debut: Produce 101 ===
The first season of the "survival" show Produce 101 aired on Mnet from January–April 2016, with 101 female trainees from different agencies competing. While the final eleven trainees went on to form the girl group I.O.I, contestants Lee Hae-in (formerly SS Entertainment), Kim So-hee (Music Works), Yoon Chae-kyung (formerly DSP Media), Lee Su-hyun (HYWY Entertainment, formerly SS Entertainment) and Han Hye-ri (formerly Star Empire Entertainment) ranked 17th, 15th, 16th, 13th and 12th respectively in the final episode. LOEN Entertainment then formed the group of runner-up contestants, I.B.I.

The members of I.B.I (with the exception of Yoon Chae-kyung) appeared on the second episode of I.O.I's reality TV show LAN Cable Friend in June 2016.

LOEN Entertainment began promoting I.B.I with a series of YouTube videos of the I.B.I members (individually and as a group) singing their favorite song live. A webtoon series titled 'I.B.I's Debut Story' drawn by the popular webtoon artist Omyo was also released around the same time, in five parts depicting each member's debut story.

=== 2016: Debut with Molae Molae ===
I.B.I released their digital single album Molae Molae (몰래몰래) on August 18, 2016. On the same day, the group held their debut showcase and their debut stage on M! Countdown.

On August 19, 2016, I.B.I performed on Music Bank. They also held a guerrilla concert 'Run to You' on the very same day at Dongdaemun Design Plaza, performing their title song "Molae Molae", as well as singles from Produce 101 such as "When the Cherry Blossom Fade" and "Pick Me".

I.B.I flew to Thailand on 22 September 2016 to film their six-episode reality show, Hello I.B.I., which aired 8 October–12 November 2016.

== Discography ==
=== Singles ===
| Title | Details | Peak chart position | Sales (Digital Download) | Album |
| Title | Details | KOR | Sales (Digital Download) | Album |
|---|---|---|---|---|
| "Molae Molae" (몰래몰래) | Released: August 18, 2016; Label: LOEN Entertainment; Format: Digital download | 51 | KOR: 50,634+ | Molae Molae (몰래몰래) |

== Filmography ==
=== Television show ===
| Year | Title | Channel | Note(s) |
|---|---|---|---|
| 2016 | Hello I.B.I | JTBC | Reality show |

=== Music videos ===
| Year | Title | Length | Notes |
|---|---|---|---|
| 2016 | "Molae Molae" (몰래몰래) | 4:05 | Producer: K.I.D, Composer: ZigZag Note |
