= Ahn Jun-won =

South Korean actor (born 1999)

- Born: February 3, 1999 (age 27); South Korea
- Occupation: Actor
- Years active: 2023–present
- Agent: MEGAMETA
- Height: 1.85 m (6 ft 1 in)
- Website: megametaent.com

Ahn Jun-won (Korean: 안준원; born 3 February 1999) is a South Korean actor from the ASTEON project under MegaMeta Entertainment. He was a contestant in survival show, Project 7 in 2024.

== Career ==
In 2023, Ahn starred in the web series, Find My Secret Santa.

In October 2024, Ahn participated as a contestant in JTBC boy group reality competition survival show, Project 7 as a trainee. He advanced to the final episode as one of the last 21 trainees but was eliminated and did not make the debut lineup.

In 2025, On February 11, Ahn was announced to be the host of the web show, Music Camp. On February 19, He signed an exclusive contract with Megameta and plans to work as a global idol-actor through diverse activities in acting, singing, and dancing.

In September he joined Asteon, an actor group along with Yang Jun-beom and Nam-minsu. He appeared in the season 2 of Vigloo's hit series, The Bedmate Game: Sharehouse. In December, he starred in the Wavve and Rakuten Viki Original drama, Will You Be My Manager? as a lead actor.

== Filmography ==
=== Web series ===
Year	Title	Role	Notes	Ref.
2023	Find My Secret Santa	Seo Ji-sung		
2024	Peak Season	Ahn Jun-won		
2024	Cohabitation 101	Kim Jang-chun		
2025	The Bedmate Game: Sharehouse	Nam Ji-hyuk		
2025	Will You Be My Manager?	Gu Eun-ho		

=== Television shows ===
Year	Title	Role	Notes	Ref.
2024	Project 7	Contestant		
