= Lim Nam-kyu =

South Korean luger (born 1989)

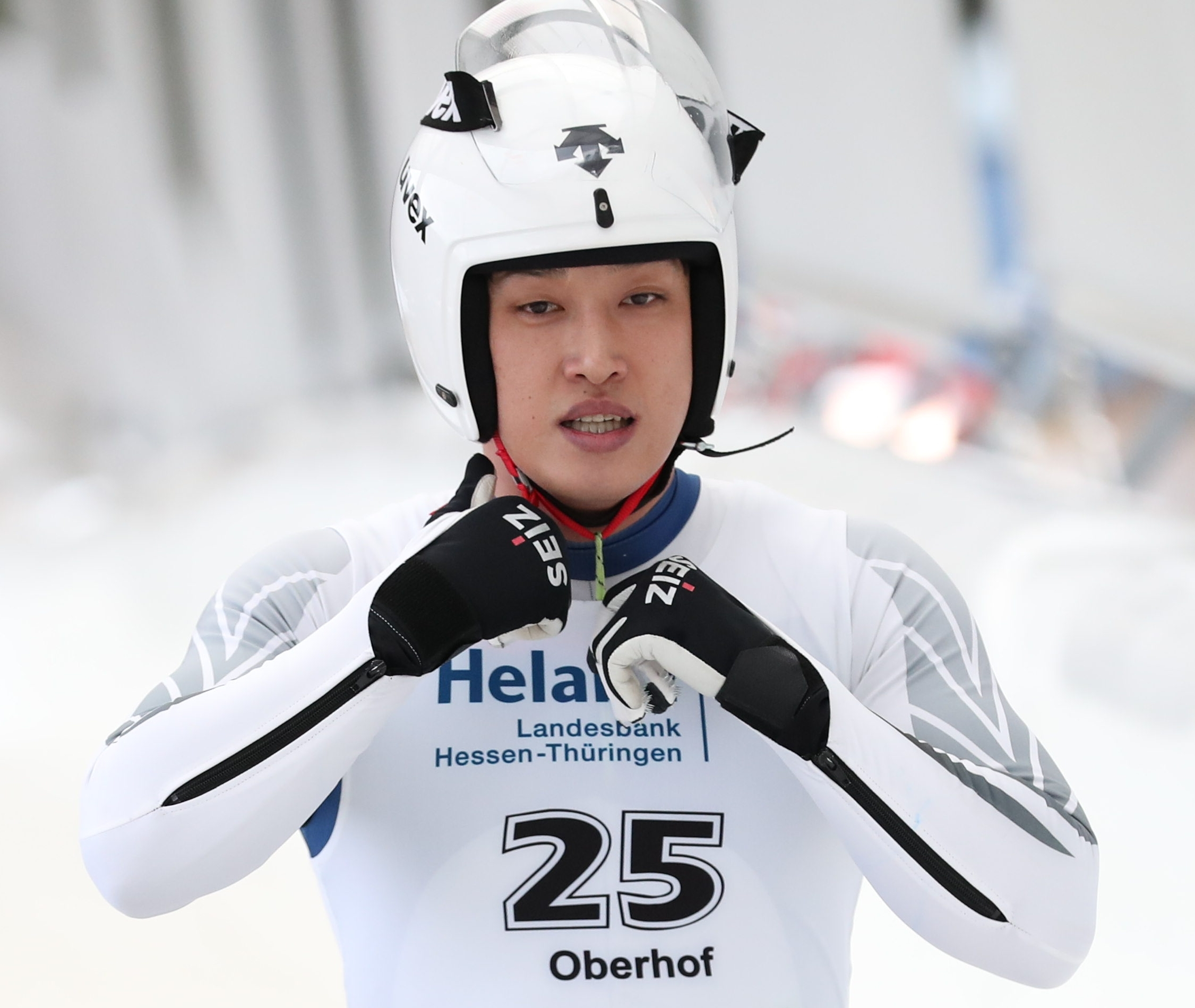
- Lim in 2020

Personal information
- Nationality: South Korean
- Born: 1 September 1989 (age 36) Seoul, South Korea
- Education: Yong In University
- Height: 1.78 m (5 ft 10 in)
- Weight: 87 kg (192 lb)

Sport
- Country: South Korea
- Sport: Luge
- Event: Singles
- Coached by: Steffen Sartor (GER)

Korean name
- Hangul: 임남규
- RR: Im Namgyu
- MR: Im Namgyu

Lim Nam-kyu (Korean: 임남규; (born 1 September 1989) is a South Korean luger. Lim is competing at the 2018 Winter Olympics and 2022 Winter Olympics for South Korea.

== Biography ==
Lim was born on September 1, 1989 in Gangdong District, Seoul, South Korea.

Lim was a former soccer player who played from middle school until his first year of college. He was a classmate with soccer player Choi Jung-han at Eonnam High School, which was famous for soccer school in Seoul, and played on the same team until he transferred.

== Career ==
Lim began playing luge at the age of 25. After finishing his mandatory military service in 2014, he was studying in college when he took part in a national luge selection test because he wanted to experience the Taereung Athletes Village. There was no luge stadium, the test was based on physical fitness. He thought he was too old to be selected but he ranked first in the test and was chosen to join the team.

Lim was coached by Steffen Sartor and Robert Fegg, and despite having only 4 years of experience, he was selected to represent the national team for the 2018 Winter Olympics in Pyeongchang. He finished 30th in Men's Singles.

In 2019, Lim retired as an athlete and became a coach for the national team. Ahead of the 2022 Winter Olympics in Beijing, the Korean Luge Federation requested his return to competition because of a shortage of eligible athletes. After consideration, he decided to return to competition.

In December 2021, while preparing for the 2021–22 Luge World Cup in Germany, Lim suffered a deep shin injury during training. He stayed in the hospital for two days before returning to South Korea to recover. Learning that strong performances in the remaining events could secure Olympic qualification, he decided to resume competition just three days later, traveling to Latvia on crutches. He completed the remaining events and earned qualification for his second consecutive Olympics.

Lim participated in 2022 Winter Olympics at Beijing and finished 33rd out of 34 in Men's Singles. Despite having recently suffered a serious injury, he completed the competition and received widespread encouragement and support from the public.

In 2022, Lim was appointed as a luge national team coach under the head coach Wolfgang Staudinger.

== Filmography ==
=== Television shows ===
Year	Title	Network	Role	Notes	Ref.
2022–2023	The Gentlemen's League 2	JTBC/Netflix	Regular Member	a.k.a (Let's Play Soccer 2)	
2023–2025	The Gentlemen's League 3	JTBC/Netflix	Regular Member	a.k.a (Let's Play Soccer 3)	
2025–present	The Gentlemen's League 4	JTBC	Regular Member	a.k.a (Let's Play Soccer 4)	
