= Project 7 =

South Korean television program

- Promotional poster
- Hangul: 프로젝트7
- RR: Peurojekteu7
- MR: P'ŭrojekt'ŭ7
- Genre: Reality competition
- Created by: JTBC
- Directed by: Ma Gun-young; Chae Sung-wook
- Presented by: Lee Soo-hyuk
- Judges: Ryan S. Jhun; Lee Hae-in; Ha Sung-woon; Ryu D; Bada Lee
- Country of origin: South Korea
- Original language: Korean
- No. of episodes: 12

Production
- Production companies: Studio Slam; SLL

Original release
- Network: JTBC
- Release: October 18 – December 27, 2024

Project 7 (Korean: 프로젝트7) is a 2024 South Korean boy group reality competition survival show created by JTBC. It followed the process of creating a new global boy group. It premiered on JTBC on October 18, 2024, and aired every Friday at 20:50 (KST). The show ended on December 27, 2024, with the formation of a seven-member boy group named Close Your Eyes.

== Production and Background ==
The program was co-directed by Ma Gun-young and Chae Sung-wook. It was co-produced by Studio Slam and SLL.

On April 20, 2024, JTBC revealed teasers inviting any male to apply for the show. The program will be produced by the creators of Sing Again and will air in the second half of 2024.

The theme song, "Run (Up To You)" (달려(Up To You)) was released on September 24, 2024, accompanied by a performance of the song the next day by the 100 contestants.

Lee Soo-hyuk, was recruited as Project 7 host. The panel also includes Lee Hae-in, Ha Sung-woon, Bada Lee, Hi-Hat Entertainment performance director Ryu D, as well as prominent songwriter and producer Ryan S. Jhun.

== Cast ==
- MC: Lee Soo-hyuk
- Music Special Director: Ryan Jhun
- Creative Special Director: Lee Hae-In
- Dance Special Directors: Bada Lee and Ryu D
- Vocal Special Director: Ha Sung-woon
- Zero Setting Special Directors: Miyeon, Shin Yoomi, Hui, Lee Dae-hwi, Nam Woo-hyun, Moonbyul, and Yoo Hwe-seung
- Position Match Special Director: Moonbyul

== Episodes ==
- Episode 1 (October 18, 2024)
- Episode 2 (October 18, 2024)
- Episode 3 (October 25, 2024)
- Episode 4 (November 1, 2024)
- Episode 5 (November 8, 2024)
- Episode 6 (November 15, 2024)
- Episode 7 (November 22, 2024)
- Episode 8 (November 29, 2024)
- Episode 9 (December 6, 2024)
- Episode 10 (December 13, 2024)
- Episode 11 (December 20, 2024)
- Episode 12 (December 27, 2024)

== Contestants ==
There were a total of 200 contestants involved with the show, but 100 contestants, who made it past the Zero Setting Project, have enough data to record. The English names of all the contestants are presented in accordance with the official website.

Color key

Final members of Close Your Eyes
Contestants eliminated in the final episode (Ep. 12)
Contestants eliminated at the third assembly ceremony (Ep. 11)
Contestants eliminated at the second assembly ceremony (Ep. 8)
Contestants eliminated at the first assembly ceremony (Ep. 5)
Contestants that left the show

Top 100 Project 7 contestants
Ma Jingxiang (마징시앙)	Sakurada Kenshin (櫻田健真) / (사쿠라다 켄신)	Jeon Min-wook (전민욱)	Seo Kyoung-bae (서경배)	Song Seung-ho (송승호)
Jang Yeo-jun (장여준)	Kim Sung-min (김성민)	Kim Si-hun (김시훈)	Nam Ji-woon (남지운)	Kang Hyun-woo (강현우)
Kim Hyun-woo (김현우)	Yi Chen (亦辰) / (이첸)	Kim Jeong-min (김정민)	Woo Ha-joon (우하준)	Bing Hua (秉桦) / (빙화)
Ahn Jun-won (안준원)	Yoo Young-seo (유영서)	Jung Se-yun (정세윤)	Andy (アンディ) / (앤디)	Lynn Lynn (林林) / (린린)
Park Jun-seo (박준서)	Kang Min-seo (강민서)	Lee Han-bin (이한빈)	Fong Atilla (方玉亨) / (팡아틸라)	Kim Joo-hyun (김주현)
Abe Yura (安部结蘭) / (아베 유라)	Lee Gun-woo (이건우)	Chae Hee-ju (채희주)	Kwon Yong-hyun (권용현)	Oh Tae-hwan (오태환)
Wu Chenyu (吴宸宇) / (우첸유)	Kim Joon-woo (김준우)	Yu Ji-ahn (유지안)	Shin Jae-won (신재원)	Asaka Kotaro (浅香孝太郎) / (아사카 코타로)
Kim Tae-yu (김태유)	Fukuyama Sota (福山颯大) / (후쿠야마 소타)	Ha Seok-hee (하석희)	Seo Jin-won (서진원)	Jung Seung-won (정승원)
Oh Seung-chan (오승찬)	Park Jun-woo (박준우)	Lee Ji-hoon (이지훈)	Kim Hyun-jae (김현재)	Yeom Ye-chan (염예찬)
Yoo Hee-do (유희도)	Kwon Ye-ung (권예웅)	Aom (ออม) / (어엄)	Cho Hyo-jin (조효진)	Kim Do-hun (김도훈)
Kang Wang-seok (강왕석)	Kwon Yang-woo (권양우)	Kim Young-hoon (김영훈)	Song Hyung-seok (송형석)	Im Si-u (임시우)
Kim Ji-min (김지민)	Baek Ji-ho (백지호)	Choi Ju-young (최주영)	Sviat (Святослав) / (스비아트)	Obayashi Yusei (大林悠成) / (오바야시 유우세)
Ok Chang-hyeon (옥창현)	Hou Guanyi (侯冠一) / (허우관이)	Petch (เพชร) / (펫)	Lee Eun-suh (이은서)	Kang Ji-min (강지민)
Santa (แซนต้า) / (산타)	Ayalon Adam (アヤロン・アダム) / (아야론 아담)	Jeong Deun-haesol (정든해솔)	Park Chan-yong (박찬용)	Oh Young-woong (오영웅)
Lee Yu-jun (이유준)	Yoo Hyeon-seung (유현승)	Yang Ju-ho (양주호)	Lin Weichen (林唯辰) / (린웨이천)	Zhang Jinglong (张景龙) / (장경용)
Kim Eun-ho (김은호)	Kim Dan-u (김단우)	Kim Tae-sung (김태성)	Kim Min-jun (김민준)	Kang Hee-min (강희민)
Kim Sung-jun (김성준)	Ko Min-sung (고민성)	Kim Yoon-sue (김윤수)	Kim Si-yul (김시율)	Tsujii Ryoma (辻井稜眞) / (츠지이 료마)
Lee No-yul (이노율)	Jang Hyeon-seok (장현석)	Manabe Jin (真鍋仁) / (마나베 진)	Lee Ju-chan (이주찬)	Choi Byung-hoon (최병훈)
Yoon Ju-han (윤주한)	Jang In-jae (장인재)	Kim Jeong-yun (김정윤)	Yamaguchi Satoshi (山口悟史) / (야마구치 사토시)	Kim Ji-hwan (김지환)
Lee Do-kyeong (이도경)	Lim Hyun-woo (임현우)	Lee Hyo-bin (이효빈)	Lee Jun-seon (이준선)	Jung Jo-han (高浚涵) / (정요한)

== Voting & Survival Announcements ==
=== Voting ===
The voting process for Project 7 is done through the official website and the Weverse app as the primary platforms to vote for the contestants.

=== Top 7 ===
The top seven contestants were determined through popularity with online voting and audience live voting, and the results are shown at the end of most episodes.

Color key

New to the Top 7 (Note: Indicates contestants who had never placed in the Top 7 in any prior elimination rounds or ranking announcements.)
Returned to Top 7 (Note: Indicates contestants who had placed in the Top 7 in a prior elimination round or ranking announcement, then had placed out of it, and then had come back)

Top 7 Contestants After Each Ranking Announcement
#	Ep. 2	Ep. 3	Ep. 5	Ep. 6	Ep. 8	Ep. 11	Ep. 12
1	Jeon Minwook	Jeon Minwook	Jeon Minwook	Sakurada Kenshin (▲1)	Jeon Minwook (▲1)	Sakurada Kenshin (▲1)	Ma Jingxiang (▲4)
2	Sakurada Kenshin	Sakurada Kenshin	Sakurada Kenshin	Jeon Minwook (▼1)	Sakurada Kenshin (▼1)	Seo Kyoungbae (▲1)	Sakurada Kenshin (▼1)
3	Kim Sihun	Kim Sihun	Kim Sungmin (▲2)	Seo Kyoungbae (▲4)	Seo Kyoungbae	Jeon Minwook (▼2)	Jeon Minwook
4	Kim Sungmin	Ma Jingxiang (▲1)	Kim Sihun (▼1)	Jang Yeojun (▲2)	Jang Yeojun	Kim Sungmin (▲2)	Seo Kyoungbae (▼2)
5	Ma Jingxiang	Kim Sungmin (▼1)	Ma Jingxiang (▼1)	Kim Sungmin (▼2)	Song Seungho (▲1)	Ma Jingxiang (▲2)	Song Seungho (▲1)
6	Kang Minseo	Jang Yeojun (▲9)	Jang Yeojun	Song Seungho (▲8)	Kim Sungmin (▼1)	Song Seungho (▼1)	Jang Yeojun (▲1)
7	Kang Hyunwoo	Seo Kyoungbae (▲12)	Seo Kyoungbae	Nam Jiwoon (▲5)	Ma Jingxiang (▲1)	Jang Yeojun (▼3)	Kim Sungmin (▼3)

=== 1st Assembly Ceremony ===
The first voting period for the 1st Assembly Ceremony took place from October 18 to November 2, 2024. The fans, named World Assemblers, voted for their top seven contestants. Alongside voting for their top 7, World Assemblers would also vote for 14 contestants, to assemble a unit, which seemed to foreshadow performances together. Regarding eliminations, the top 70 trainees who received the most points, calculated through votes received through Korea and through the rest of the world, got to continue onto the next round and the bottom 30 trainees got officially eliminated. During the ceremony, 1, 3, 7, or 9-10 contestants would be called up at a time (69–61, 60–51, etc. 10–8, 7–1, 70) and then they would find out which unit they would be a part of, which are labeled A1 down to A5. Color key

Top 7

1st Assembly Ceremony (Episode 5)
Rank	Contestants	Points				Unit	Rank	Contestants	Points				Unit
Rank	Contestants	Votes		Benefit Points	Total (Note: Points were calculated using this formula: (Number of Korean Votes) + (Number of Global Votes) + (Any bonus points from winning benefits, either team or individual))	Unit	Rank	Contestants	Votes		Benefit Points	Total	Unit
Rank	Contestants	Korean	Global	Benefit Points	Total	Unit	Rank	Contestants	Korean	Global	Benefit Points	Total	Unit
1	Jeon Minwook	2,413,947	1,746,093	100,000	4,260,040	A3	36	Asaka Kotaro	168,161	207,342	0	375,503	A1
2	Sakurada Kenshin	2,154,793	1,988,001	20,000	4,162,794	A2	37	Oh Seungchan	311,612	54,226	0	365,838	A2
3	Kim Sungmin	1,647,115	917,289	0	2,564,404	A2	38	Park Junwoo	271,142	64,834	20,000	355,976	A1
4	Kim Sihun	1,443,091	1,078,012	0	2,521,103	A3	39	Oh Taehwan	287,948	55,685	0	343,633	A4
5	Ma Jingxiang	1,661,670	819,854	0	2,481,524	A2	40	Seo Jinwon	226,484	105,123	0	331,607	A2
6	Jang Yeojun	977,033	1,221,266	20,000	2,218,299	A3	41	Ha Seokhee	215,961	81,992	20,000	317,953	A1
7	Seo Kyoungbae	1,183,885	1,013,381	0	2,197,266	A3	42	Ok Changhyeon	268,105	25,783	0	293,888	A5
8	Kang Hyunwoo	875,676	826,260	0	1,701,936	A3	43	Chae Heeju	144,707	124,509	20,000	289,216	A1
9	Binghua	867,770	811,113	20,000	1,698,883	A3	44	Song Hyungseok	218,945	65,335	0	284,280	A1
10	Kang Minseo	1,137,447	498,574	0	1,636,021	A3	45	Kim Younghoon	77,113	202,977	0	280,090	A1
11	Yichen	938,187	669,047	0	1,607,234	A4	46	Petch	141,147	107,468	20,000	268,615	A4
12	Nam Jiwoon	1,158,074	439,722	0	1,597,796	A4	47	Lee Gunwoo	199,888	47,021	20,000	266,909	A1
13	Fong Atilla	582,702	998,129	0	1,580,831	A2	48	Lynn Lynn	127,116	114,502	20,000	261,618	A4
14	Song Seungho	999,650	557,468	0	1,557,118	A3	49	Yeom Yechan	151,356	104,170	0	255,526	A2
15	Ahn Jun-won	653,118	536,650	0	1,189,768	A4	50	Ayalon Adam	119,786	127,644	0	247,430	A1
16	Kim Hyunwoo	619,454	529,463	0	1,148,917	A2	51	Wu Chenyu	151,146	72,853	20,000	243,999	A5
17	Jung Seyun	587,571	543,847	0	1,131,418	A3	52	Choi Juyoung	174,025	63,275	0	237,300	A4
18	Park Junseo	571,446	361,397	120,000	1,052,843	A3	53	Kim Taeyu	119,263	97,258	20,000	236,521	A4
19	Andy	258,786	727,593	0	986,379	A4	54	Oh Youngwoong	189,522	33,517	0	223,039	A5
20	Kwon Yonghyun	643,956	304,094	0	948,050	A1	55	Baek Jiho	113,975	104,830	0	218,805	A1
21	Abe Yura	361,087	559,022	0	920,109	A3	56	Kang Jimin	181,250	35,545	0	216,795	A5
22	Yoo Youngseo	536,263	260,828	120,000	917,091	A4	57	Jung Seungwon	181,145	35,261	0	216,406	A5
23	Fukuyama Sota	460,193	283,814	0	744,007	A4	58	Cho Hyojin	146,696	50,495	0	197,191	A5
24	Woo Hajoon	508,150	103,009	0	611,159	A2	59	Obayashi Yusei	112,247	62,828	20,000	195,075	A5
25	Shin Jaewon	337,160	226,918	0	564,078	A2	60	Im Siu	157,010	36,069	0	193,079	A3
26	Kim Joohyun	395,535	146,547	0	542,082	A1	61	Kim Joonwoo	147,168	43,108	0	190,276	A5
27	Kim Hyunjae	285,278	253,911	0	539,189	A1	62	Jeong Deunhaesol	121,985	42,187	20,000	184,172	A4
28	Sviat	278,000	209,773	0	487,773	A2	63	Lee Eunsuh	130,048	32,315	20,000	182,363	A5
29	Lee Hanbin	300,670	174,543	0	475,213	A2	64	Kim Jimin	110,205	66,185	0	176,390	A5
30	Kim Dohun	155,387	300,100	0	455,487	A1	65	Kang Wangseok	121,409	54,109	0	175,518	A5
31	Yoo Heedo	308,994	116,454	20,000	445,448	A3	66	Lee Jihoon	119,053	56,201	0	175,254	A5
32	Kwon Yangwoo	249,572	159,305	0	408,877	A4	67	Park Chanyong	122,614	31,172	20,000	173,786	A3
33	Santa	179,208	203,647	20,000	402,855	A2	68	Aom	85,756	82,571	0	168,327	A5
34	Kim Jeongmin	253,656	132,578	0	386,234	A2	69	Hou Guanyi	113,032	52,537	0	165,569	A4
35	Yu Jiahn	196,485	159,120	20,000	375,605	A1	70	Kwon Yeung	104,237	40,885	20,000	165,122	A5

=== 2nd Assembly Ceremony ===
The second voting period for the 2nd Assembly Ceremony took place from November 8 to November 23, 2024. The World Assemblers voted for their top seven contestants. Alongside voting for their top seven, World Assemblers would also assemble five units of seven contestants for each of the new songs introduced, each having their own concept; Neo/Urban (Breaking News), Old School/Retro (KOOL-AID), Fresh/Cool (Merry-Go-Round), Sexy/Bad (Trigger), & Nostalgic/Sentimental (Time After Time). Regarding eliminations, the top half (35) of the contestants who received the most votes got to continue onto the next round and the bottom half (35) of the contestants got officially eliminated. During the ceremony, each pair of opposing teams from the Rival Match, starting from its A1, then 5, 2, 4, and 3, would be called up to find out who is safe from elimination from each unit, excluding the Top 9 contestants, and 35th place contestant. The safe contestants would move to their ranking's seat in the stands for the time being. After ranks 10-34 were confirmed, the 35th place contestant was revealed, through the four candidate method, and then the Top 9 were revealed starting from 9th, then 7th and 8th, and then 6th down to 3rd, and finally 1st and 2nd. After the ceremony, and the eliminated contestants had left, Lee Soohyuk would call up each contestant, in rank order, and give them a number from 1–5, corresponding to 5 different rooms, which would determine each contestant's Assembly for the next mission. Color key

Top 7

2nd Assembly Ceremony (Episode 8)
Rank	Contestants	Points					Assembly	Rank	Contestants	Points					Assembly
Rank	Contestants	Votes			Benefit Points	Overall Total (Note: Points were calculated using this formula: (Number of Korean Votes) + (Number of Global Votes) + (Any bonus points from individual benefits))	Assembly	Rank	Contestants	Votes			Benefit Points	Overall Total	Assembly
Rank	Contestants	Korean	Global	Total	Benefit Points	Overall Total	Assembly	Rank	Contestants	Korean	Global	Total	Benefit Points	Overall Total	Assembly
1	Jeon Minwook	2,010,216	1,315,938	3,326,154	70,000	3,396,154	A1	19	Abe Yura	386,711	601,342	988,053	20,000	1,008,053	A5
2	Sakurada Kenshin	1,899,207	1,424,329	3,323,536	70,000	3,393,536	A2	20	Woo Hajoon	792,978	167,304	960,282	-20,000	940,282	A4
3	Seo Kyoungbae	1,343,267	1,193,437	2,536,704	60,000	2,596,704	A2	21	Jung Seyun	492,367	441,995	934,362	-60,000	874,362	A2
4	Jang Yeojun	1,256,570	1,245,725	2,502,295	40,000	2,542,295	A1	22	Fong Atilla	341,059	551,025	892,048	-50,000	842,048	A3
5	Song Seungho	1,241,031	753,478	1,994,509	50,000	2,044,509	A2	23	Kwon Yonghyun	497,721	225,122	722,843	70,000	792,843	A5
6	Kim Sungmin	1,279,621	684,056	1,963,677	50,000	2,013,677	A2	24	Lee Hanbin	433,182	259,466	719,648	30,000	722,648	A4
7	Ma Jingxiang	1,225,342	517,713	1,743,055	-10,000	1,733,055	A1	25	Kim Jeongmin	399,649	194,999	594,648	40,000	634,648	A3
8	Nam Jiwoon	1,256,794	409,318	1,666,112	60,000	1,726,112	A2	26	Shin Jaewon	325,072	194,051	519,123	10,000	529,123	A4
9	Kim Sihun	874,098	758,673	1,632,771	-20,000	1,612,771	A3	27	Oh Taehwan	410,281	109,209	519,490	-10,000	509,490	A4
10	Ahn Jun-won	862,424	544,986	1,407,410	20,000	1,427,410	A5	28	Asaka Kotaro	211,460	232,276	443,736	40,000	483,736	A5
11	Binghua	749,110	642,938	1,392,048	30,000	1,422,048	A4	29	Kim Joohyun	362,918	121,057	483,975	-10,000	473,975	A3
12	Yichen	737,213	541,709	1,278,922	50,000	1,328,922	A1	30	Kim Joonwoo	355,334	125,395	480,729	-10,000	470,729	A3
13	Kim Hyunwoo	667,544	563,295	1,230,839	60,000	1,290,839	A1	31	Chae Heeju	262,392	153,664	416,056	50,000	466,056	A3
14	Kang Hyunwoo	669,774	602,882	1,272,656	10,000	1,282,656	A5	32	Lee Gunwoo	347,750	129,172	476,922	-20,000	456,922	A3
15	Kang Minseo	848,073	422,141	1,270,214	-30,000	1,240,214	A5	33	Yu Jiahn	243,432	152,041	395,473	60,000	455,473	A5
16	Yoo Youngseo	719,070	443,575	1,162,645	70,000	1,232,645	A4	34	Wu Chenyu	190,716	194,547	385,263	60,000	445,263	A4
17	Park Junseo	611,704	509,155	1,120,859	-10,000	1,110,859	A1	35	Lynn Lynn	198,002	195,239	393,241	40,000	433,241	A1
18	Andy	316,670	695,000	1,011,670	30,000	1,041,670	A2	–	—N/a						

=== 3rd Assembly Ceremony ===
The third voting period for the 3rd Assembly Ceremony took place from November 29 to December 13, 2024. The World Assemblers voted for their top three contestants. Alongside voting for their top three, World Assemblers would also assemble three units of seven contestants for each of the new songs introduced for the finale; Psycho, Act Up, & Antidote. Regarding eliminations, the top 21 trainees who received the most votes got to continue onto the next round and the bottom 14 trainees got officially eliminated. During the ceremony, each team from the Originals Match, starting from its A4, then 5, 3, 1, and 2, would be called up to find out who is safe from elimination from each unit, excluding the Top 9 contestants, and the 21st place contestant. The safe contestants would move to their ranking's seat in the stands for the time being. After ranks 10-20 were confirmed, the Top 9 were revealed, starting from 9th, then 7th and 8th, and then 6th down to 3rd, and finally 1st and 2nd, and then the 21st place contestant was revealed, through the four candidate method. Color key

Top 7
Psycho
Act Up
Antidote

3rd Assembly Ceremony (Episode 11)
Rank	Contestants	Points					Unit	Rank	Contestants	Points					Unit
Rank	Contestants	Votes			Benefit Points	Total	Unit	Rank	Contestants	Votes			Benefit Points	Total	Unit
Rank	Contestants	Korean	Global	Total	Benefit Points	Total	Unit	Rank	Contestants	Korean	Global	Total	Benefit Points	Total	Unit
1	Sakurada Kenshin	1,685,345	1,525,283	3,210,628	321,063	3,531,691	Psycho	12	Binghua	514,044	427,780	941,824	0	941,824	Antidote
2	Seo Kyoungbae	1,334,653	1,558,976	2,893,629	289,363	3,182,992	Antidote	13	Yichen	497,446	397,458	894,904	0	894,904	Act Up
3	Jeon Minwook	1,808,821	1,270,116	3,078,937	0	3,078,937	Psycho	14	Yoo Youngseo	549,771	339,915	889,686	0	889,686	Antidote
4	Kim Sungmin	1,180,510	776,284	1,956,794	195,679	2,152,473	Antidote	15	Andy	286,626	495,013	781,639	78,164	859,803	Act Up
5	Ma Jingxiang	1,450,842	634,736	2,085,578	50,000	2,135,578	Act Up	16	Lynn Lynn	479,633	311,290	790,923	0	790,923	Act Up
6	Song Seungho	1,069,382	725,280	1,794,662	229,466	2,024,128	Psycho	17	Kang Hyunwoo	427,510	359,687	787,197	0	787,197	Psycho
7	Jang Yeojun	974,447	901,431	1,875,878	0	1,875,878	Psycho	18	Kim Jeongmin	511,109	217,089	728,198	50,000	778,198	Psycho
8	Kim Sihun	1,041,954	774,383	1,816,337	0	1,816,337	Antidote	19	Jung Seyun	431,356	258,411	689,767	68,977	758,744	Act Up
9	Nam Jiwoon	1,131,322	328,294	1,459,616	145,962	1,605,578	Antidote	20	Park Junseo	409,191	348,312	757,503	0	757,503	Act Up
10	Woo Hajoon	1,034,161	153,593	1,187,754	50,000	1,237,754	Antidote	21	Kim Hyunwoo	449,978	289,336	739,314	0	739,314	Psycho
11	Ahn Jun-won	698,145	325,564	1,023,709	50,000	1,073,709	Act Up	–	—N/a						

=== 4th Global Vote ===
The fourth voting period for the final episode took place from December 20 to December 17, 2024. The World Assemblers voted for their top one contestant. As we have known from the beginning of the show, 7 contestants will debut, and this decides it all. The top 7 contestant will debut, and the bottom 14 will be officially eliminated. During the Final Live, World Assemblers would get another chance to vote for their top contestant, and each vote cast would count for two votes towards the selected contestant. Alongside voting for one contestant, World Assemblers would also assemble their ideal debut group, selecting seven contestants as their ideal final lineup. During the final ceremony, the contestants ranks were revealed, starting from 6th down to 3rd, then 1st and 2nd, and then finally the 7th and final member. Color Key

Top 7

Final Results
Rank	Contestants	Points								Total (Note: Points were calculated using this formula: (4th Global Votes) + (Final Live Global Votes) + (Director's Benefits))
Rank	Contestants	4th Global Vote			Live Vote + Director's Benefit					Total
Rank	Contestants	Domestic	Global	Total	Domestic (Note: Calculated through this formula: (Live Bias Votes) + (Live Assemble Votes))	Global	Total	Director Benefit	Total	Total
1	Ma Jingxiang	2,991,238	644,874	3,636,112	1,532,848	810,568	2,343,416	25,000	2,368,416	6,004,528
2	Sakurada Kenshin	411,466	1,108,546	1,520,012	1,676,670	1,911,116	3,587,786	0	3,587,786	5,107,798
3	Jeon Minwook	278,687	1,090,557	1,369,244	1,993,548	1,691,170	3,684,718	0	3,684,718	5,053,962
4	Seo Kyoungbae	511,185	771,974	1,283,159	1,451,092	1,551,222	3,002,314	0	3,002,314	4,285,473
5	Song Seungho	551,908	557,198	1,109,106	1,693,424	1,276,002	2,969,426	50,000	3,019,426	4,128,532
6	Jang Yeojun	455,726	753,352	1,209,078	1,331,336	1,486,824	2,818,160	0	2,818,160	4,027,238
7	Kim Sungmin	399,356	618,575	1,017,931	1,444,926	1,143,796	2,588,722	50,000	2,638,722	3,656,653

== Discography ==
The theme song "Run (Up To You)" was recorded and performed by the contestants. It was released on September 26, 2024, on digital music platforms.

=== Singles ===
List of singles, showing year released, and name of the album
Title	Year	Album
"Run (Up To You)" (달려)	2024	Project 7 - Run (Up To You)
"Run (Up To You) - Piano Version" (달려)	2024	Project 7 - Run (Up To You) [Piano Version]
"Breaking News"	2024	Project 7 - Originals Match
"Kool-Aid"	2024	Project 7 - Originals Match
"Merry-Go-Round"	2024	Project 7 - Originals Match
"Trigger"	2024	Project 7 - Originals Match
"Time After Time"	2024	Project 7 - Originals Match
"Psycho"	2024	Project 7 - Final
"Act Up"	2024	Project 7 - Final
"Antidote"	2024	Project 7 - Final
"Everywhere" (어제 오늘 내일에)	2024	Project 7 - Final

== Ratings ==
Average TV viewership ratings (Nationwide)
Ep.	Original broadcast date	Average audience share (Nielsen Korea)
1	October 18, 2024	0.595% (42nd)
2	October 18, 2024	0.595% (58th)
3	October 25, 2024	0.302% (54th)
4	November 1, 2024	0.405% (53th)
5	November 8, 2024	0.311% (54th)
6	November 15, 2024	0.325% (57th)
7	November 22, 2024	0.408% (42nd)
8	November 29, 2024	0.283% (55th)
9	December 6, 2024	0.223% (48th)
10	December 13, 2024	0.402% (52nd)
11	December 20, 2024	0.292% (55th)
12	December 28, 2024	0.236% (57th)
Average		0.365%
In the table above, the blue numbers represent the lowest ratings and the red numbers represent the highest ratings.; This show aired on a cable channel/pay TV which normally has a relatively smaller audience compared to free-to-air TV/public broadcasters (KBS, SBS, MBC, and EBS).

== Aftermath ==
The final group, Close Your Eyes will be active for 3 years and is managed by UNCORE. The group debuted on April 2, 2025, with the mini album 'ETERNALT'.

Other contestants, other activities
- Some contestants returned to their original groups:
  - Kim Hyun-woo (11th), Yoo Young-seo (17th), and Park Jun-seo (21st) returned to BAE173.
    - On June 30, 2026, All 3 of the members departed from PocketDol
  - Kang Min-seo (22nd) and Lee Han-bin (23rd) returned to Fantasy Boys.
    - They both sued PocketDol Studios for settlement issues such as failure to provide data and non-payment, problems with the company's finances and operations, and the breakdown of trust due to non-fulfillment of contractual obligations, on November 19, 2025.
    - Kang Min-seo & Lee Han-bin departed from PocketDol and Fantasy Boys after the lawsuit on May 14, 2026.
  - Chae Hee-ju (28th), Lee No-yul (86th), and Choi Byung-hoon (90th) returned to CMDM.
  - Wu Chenyu (31st) and Manabe Jin (88th) returned to SW:C.
    - Wu Chenyu left the group and the company, DNA Entertainment on February 7, 2025, due to health reasons.
  - Yu Ji-ahn (33rd) returned to Skye.
    - The group went on an indefinite hiatus on November 25, 2025.
  - Kim Tae-yu (36th) returned to ABLUE.
  - Hou Guanyi (62nd) returned to Youtove.
  - Kim Tae-sung (78th) returned to K-Tigers Zero.
- Some contestants left their companies or joined new ones:
  - Kim Si-hun (8th) joined Eighty6 on June 22, 2025.
  - Nam Ji-woon (9th) joined Modhaus.
  - Yichen (12th) joined WakeOne Entertainment.
  - Woo Ha-joon (14th) joined YM Entertainment on January 18, 2025.
    - He left the company on September 2, 2025, after their plans to debut their boy group, Unname fell through. He later joined IST Entertainment, but then left in the first half of 2026.
  - Binghua (15th) signed with RND Company.
  - Ahn Jun-won (16th) signed with Megameta on February 19, 2025.
  - Lynn Lynn (20th) joined IX Entertainment.
  - Oh Tae-hwan (30th) joined iNKODE Enterainment.
  - Kim Joon-woo (32nd) joined Hiver Lab Entertainment on January 4, 2025.
    - He seemingly left the company in the first half of 2026.
  - Kang Wang-seok (51st), who left MyPlan Entertainment, and Yamaguchi Satoshi (94th) both joined DND ENS.
  - Song Hyung-seok (54th) left SHORTT and joined Studio Blossom.
  - Kim Ji-min (56th) and Yang Ju-ho (73rd) have both seemingly left Biscuit Entertainment, after their old group, HAWW silently disbanded in 2024.
  - Ok Chang-hyeon (61st) joined CTD Entertainment on January 24, 2025.
    - He seems to have left the company around the end of April 2025.
  - Santa joined Mine Media Production.
    - He later left the company on April 23, 2026.
  - Ayalon Adam (67th) joined BMSG.
  - Park Chan-yong (69th) joined JUST FOCUS Media.
  - Kang Hee-min (80th) left ICE Entertainment and joined Wannabe Entertainment.
    - He seemingly later left the company in December 2025.
  - Lee Ju-chan (89th) joined Nature Space.
    - He later left the company alongside Kwon Ye-ung (47th) and Cho Hyo-jin (49th).
- Some contestants will debut or debuted in new boy groups, released music as solo artists, or released music under their groups:
  - Kim Si-hun (8th) who already debuted as a soloist prior to the airing of the show, released his second single 'Fly' on February 25, 2025.
  - Nam Ji-woon (9th) was revealed as Idntt's 7th member on July 18, 2025. He debuted as a member of Idntt's first sub unit, Uneverm8t with their first mini album Unevermet with the title tracks 'You Never Met', 'Storm', and 'BOYtude' on August 11, 2025.
  - Kang Hyun-woo (10th) debuted as a soloist with his first digital single 'Serena-Day' with a title track of the same name on May 22, 2025.
  - The contestants from BAE173 and Fantasy Boys debuted as members of PocketDol Studio's new project boy group, Double 0ne with their first mini album Xpert with the title track 'On the Rocks with Kiss' on June 12, 2025.
  - Kim Hyun-woo (11th), Yoo Young-seo (17th), and Park Jun-seo (21st), as members of BAE173, released their first full-length album New Chapter: Desear with the title track 'Turned Up' on October 14, 2025, following the two pre-releases "One Day' and 'What's Wrong?'
  - Ahn Jun-won (16th) was confirmed to be a member of Megameta's predebut actor-idol boy group, Asteon on April 1, 2025.
  - Andy (19th) was added to the lineup of Mystic Story's debuted boy group, ARrC on January 30, 2025. He debuted as a member of ARrC with their second extended play (EP) Nu Kidz: Out the Box with the title track 'Nu Kidz' on February 18, 2025.
    - The group later officially disbanded on June 22, 2026.
  - Kang Min-seo (22nd) and Lee Han-bin (23rd), as members of Fantasy Boys, released their fourth mini album Undeniable with a title track of the same name on March 20, 2025.
  - Chae Hee-ju (28th), Lee No-yul (86th), and Choi Byung-hoon (90th), as members of CMDM, released their second digital single Decalcomanie on May 8, 2025.
  - Oh Tae-hwan (30th) debuted as a member of one of iNKODE Entertainment's new boy groups, KEYVITUP with a self-titled EP, with the title tracks 'Keyvitup' and 'Legendary' on April 8, 2026.
  - Kim Joon-woo (32nd) debuted as a soloist under the stage name Doha with the single album 'Dream In My Bag' with the title track 'Zipper' on July 15, 2025, following the pre-release 'That's me'.
  - Oh Seung-chan (41st), as a member of Conti Inc's new boy group, X_ON released their pre-release digital single Night's Dream on June 28, 2026.
  - Yeom Ye-chan (45th) is a member of Choco Entertainment's trainee group ChoCo1. They released a company mini album, ChoCo La Familia with the title tracks 'Gimme' and 'Frenzy' on February 24, 2026.
  - Yoo Hee-do (46th) who already debuted as a soloist under the stage name HeeDo prior to the airing of the show, released his second single 'Nadu' on April 22, 2025.
  - Kwon Ye-ung (47th), Cho Hyo-jin (49th), and Lee Ju-chan (89th) debuted as members of Nature Space's new boy group, XONIX with their first digital single Private on June 16, 2025.
    - The group silently disbanded in late 2025.
    - Cho Hyo-jin, under the stage name owoon, debuted as a soloist with his first extended play (EP) Painkiller with the title track 'Favorite Depression' on February 13, 2026, following the pre-release 'Bet Me'.
  - Kang Wang-seok (51st), Manabe Jin (88th), and Yamaguchi Satoshi (94th) debuted as members of DNA Entertainment and DND ENS' boy group, SW:C with their first single album 'Sweet Day' with the title track 'Candy House' on April 20, 2025.
  - Kim Young-hoon (53rd) debuted as a soloist under the stage name Lue Younghoon with his first single album 'Untold Story' with a title track of the same name on February 12, 2025.
  - Song Hyung-seok (54th) debuted as a member of Studio Blossom's new boy group, ZENITH with their first digital single Crosspoint with a title track of the same name on May 21, 2026.
  - Ok Chang-hyeon (61st) was confirmed to be a member of CTD Entertainment's predebut boy group, CTD Rookies on February 9, 2025.
    - On April 28, 2025, CTD Entertainment released a statement saying they planned to pause the preparations for CTD Rookies' debut, and by then, it seemed like Ok Chang-hyeon had left the group and the company.
  - Park Chan-yong (69th) debuted as a member of JUST FOCUS Media's new boy group, GENUS with their first digital single Sugar Rush on April 27, 2026.
  - Kang Hee-min (80th) was a predebut member of Wannabe Entertainment's new boy group, EION but he left the group and the company in December 2025.
- Some contestants left the idol industry or further expanded their careers in the acting, modeling, or entertainment industry:
  - Ahn Jun-won (16th) became MC for Gogosing's variety show Music Camp, which aired weekly from February 12 to February 26, 2025, featuring Project 7 trainees every episode, with bonus episodes in March and April.
  - Kwon Yang-woo (52nd) was officially introduced as a model under KPLUS on February 12, 2025.
  - Santa (66th) started his career as an actor with a supporting role in Thai GL drama "ClaireBell".
  - Tsujii Ryoma (85th) continued his career as a backup dancer, dancing for groups such as n.SSign, One Pact, and Zerobaseone.
- Some contestants participated in other survival shows:
  - Yichen (12th), Binghua (15th; as Xie Binghua), Lynn Lynn (20th; as Zhao Guangxu), and Yeom Ye-chan (45th) participated in Mnet's Korean survival show Boys II Planet. Binghua was eliminated in the second episode after ranking 85th, and Yichen, Lynn Lynn, and Yeom Ye-chan were all eliminated in the eighth episode after ranking 42nd, 34th, and 40th respectively.
    - Yichen, Binghua, and Lynn Lynn participated in Mnet's spin-off show of Boys II Planet; Planet C: Home Race. Binghua was eliminated in the third episode after ranking 14th, and Yichen and Lynn Lynn debuted as members of the winning boy group Modyssey under Onecead, after ranking 6th and 4th, respectively.
  - Abe Yura (26th), Asaka Kotaro (35th), Aom (48th), Obayashi Yusei (60th), and Yoo Hyeonseung (72nd), are currently participating in Lemino's Japanese survival show Produce 101 Japan Shinsekai.
    - Abe Yura is set to debut as a member of the winning boy group KO1KEYZ under Lapone Entertainment, after ranking 8th.
    - Yoo Hyeon-seung was eliminated in the final episode after ranking 17th.
    - Asaka Kotaro and Obayashi Yusei were eliminated in the tenth episode after ranking 26th and 32nd respectively.
    - Aom was eliminated in the fifth episode after ranking 81st.
  - Shin Jae-won (34th) participated in JTBC's Korean singing reality survival show Sing Again 4. He was eliminated in the third episode, after ranking between 41st and 81st.
  - Ayalon Adam (67th) participated in BMSG's Japanese audition show The Last Piece. He debuted as a member of the winning Japanese boy group STARGLOW under BMSG, after ranking in the show's top 5.
