= Will You Be My Manager? =

2025 South Korean series

- Promotional poster
- Hangul: 되어줄래? 나의 매니저
- RR: Doeeojullae? Naui maenijeo
- MR: Toeŏjullae? Naŭi maenijŏ
- Genre: Youth; Romantic; Coming of Age
- Written by: Kim Seo-ha
- Directed by: Kim Young-sam
- Starring: Kanon Nonomura; Ahn Jun-won; Yoon Do-jin; Yang Jun-beom; Nam Min-su
- Country of origin: South Korea
- Original language: Korean
- No. of seasons: 1
- No. of episodes: 6

Production
- Executive producer: Na Byung-jun
- Production location: South Korea
- Running time: 25 minutes
- Production companies: MEGAMETA; Apollo Pictures

Original release
- Network: Wavve; Rakuten Viki
- Release: 12 December – 26 December 2025

Will You Be My Manager? (Korean: 되어줄래? 나의 매니저; RR: Doeeojullae? Naui maenijeo) is a South Korean television series directed by Kim Young-sam and written by Kim Seo-ha. The drama stars Kanon Nonomura, Ahn Jun-won, Yoon Do-jin, Yang Jun-beom, and Nam Min-su. It premiered on December 12, 2025, simultaneously on Wavve in selected regions and globally on Rakuten Viki.

== Synopsis ==
Hana Hirose, a Japanese exchange student who dreams of becoming the manager of a popular pop group that hides a secret, transfers to the management major of Segi Arts High School, South Korea's only arts high school, and becomes involved with four handsome students from the acting major.

== Cast ==
=== Main ===
- Kanon Nonomura as Hana Hirose

A Japanese exchange student with a secret.

- Ahn Jun-won as Gu Eun-ho

A confident, cool child actor from 10-million-viewer films, ranked first in the acting major.

- Yoon Do-jin as Cheon Si-woo

A warm-hearted man whose style contrasts with his best friend, Gu Eun-ho.

- Yang Jun-beom as Kim Ba-reun

Hana Hirose's cousin with a charming, puppy-like charm.

- Nam Min-su as Nam Min-soo

A free-spirited man who can be lazy in the backseat but springs to life when the dopamine kicks in.

- Han Ji-an as Shin Ji-ah

A class president, Kim Ba-reun's girlfriend.

=== Supporting ===
- Do Ji-woo as Gu Leader
- Ahn Hyun-ji as Song Bit-na
- Ryu Ye-eun as Kim Seul-gi
- Woo Ri-ye as Homeroom Teacher
- Go Dong-eun as Ji-ho
- Lee Min-joo as Yoo-jin
- Yoo Min-jae as Kyung-joon
- Kang Yong-seok as Jung-hoon

== Episodes ==
No.	Title	Directed by	Written by	Original release date
1	"Hello, Hana-chan"; Transliteration: "Annyeong hanajjang" (Korean: 안녕 하나(花)짱)	Kim Young-sam	Kim Seo-ha	December 12, 2025
2	"Blossoming"; Transliteration: "Gaehwa" (Korean: 개화(開花))	Kim Young-sam	Kim Seo-ha	December 12, 2025
3	"Full Bloom"; Transliteration: "Mangae" (Korean: 만개(滿開))	Kim Young-sam	Kim Seo-ha	December 19, 2025
4	"Falling Flowers"; Transliteration: "Nakwa" (Korean: 낙화(落花))	Kim Young-sam	Kim Seo-ha	December 19, 2025
5	"Budding Leaves"; Transliteration: "Sinnok" (Korean: 신록(新綠))	Kim Young-sam	Kim Seo-ha	December 26, 2025
6	"Autumn's Harvest"; Transliteration: "Yeoreumui yeolmae" (Korean: 여름의 열매(夏の実))	Kim Young-sam	Kim Seo-ha	December 26, 2025

== Production ==
=== Development ===
The drama was planned by Megameta with the CEO, Na Byung-jun was executive producer.

It produced by Apollo Pictures, a production company known for producing several hit dramas, including Sign, Secret Healer, and The Secret Romantic Guesthouse.

=== Casting ===
On September 19, 2025, MANTANWEB was reported that Kanon will be the lead role of the drama.

== Reception ==
=== Audience viewership ===
Will You Be My Manager? was ranked in the top 5 in Europe, the Middle East, and Southeast Asia in terms of viewership in its first week on Rakuten Viki, and entered the top 10 in the Americas, Oceania, and India.
