= ARrC =

South Korean boy band

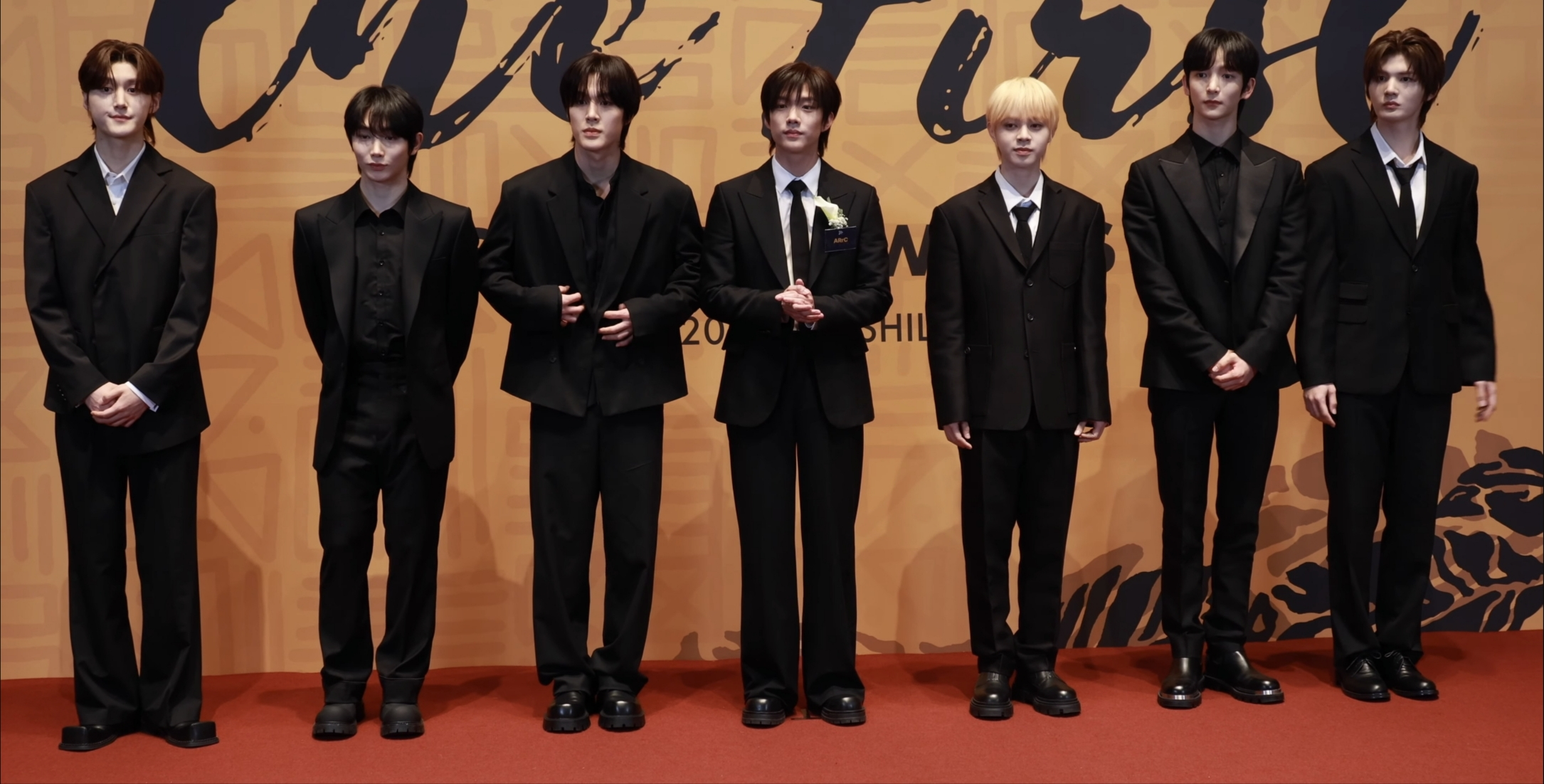
- ARrC in January 2025; L–R: Rioto, Ziwoo (former), Choi Han, Hyunmin, Kien, Jibeen, Doha

Background information
- Origin: Seoul, South Korea
- Genres: K-pop; hip hop
- Years active: 2024–2026
- Label: Mystic Story
- Past members: Hyunmin; Kien; Ziwoo; Choi Han; Andy; Rioto; Doha; Jibeen
- Website: wearrc.com

ARrC (Korean: 아크; RR: Akeu; an abbreviation for Always Remember the real Connection) was a South Korean boy band formed and managed by Mystic Story. The group consists of seven members: Hyunmin, Kien, Choi Han, Andy, Rioto, Doha, and Jibeen. Former member Ziwoo left the group in January 2025. They debuted on August 19, 2024, with the extended play (EP) Ar^c. They disbanded on June 23, 2026.

== Name ==
The group's name, ARrC, stands for Always Remember the real Connection. It embodies the belief that a "true connection with each other" is a valuable principle that transcends time, space, and interpersonal differences. They also pledge to never forget this "connectivity" as they develop into musicians who can use their music to positively impact a large number of people worldwide.

== History ==
=== 2024: Introduction and debut with Ar^c ===
In July 2024, Mystic Story announced that they would be preparing to launch their first boy group composed of seven members from various countries, with the goal of debuting in mid-August. On July 8, Mystic Story opened the group's official social media accounts, revealing the logo motion and member's profile which are Jibeen, Doha, Kien, Rioto, Ziwoo, Choi Han, and Hyunmin. (Note: The names of the members are sorted according to their group's social media post.) Among the members, Hyunmin, who was known as a contestant under his real name Park Hyun-been in Mnet's survival competition series Boys Planet but eliminated and placed 48th in the overall rankings, and Ziwoo, who went viral in South Korea after singing Maktub and Goo Yoon-hee's "Marry Me" in the classroom and his classmate uploaded it on TikTok which garnered 8.2 million views. The next day Mystic Story announced the group's first reality show World of ARrC, which would be released simultaneously on Mnet and M2 YouTube channels on July 17, and was about them growing to become an idol by solving various quests ahead of their debut. On July 12, after ARrC continuously posting individual, unit, and group photos, where they become a hot topic and garnered more than 1.16 million views with the search keyword "ARrC" in Weibo and local media outlets are focusing on the news of the debut of the Vietnamese member Kien. ARrC then released two unreleased songs "Connected" and "Alien in Seoul" on July 16 and 19, respectively, and would be included in the group's second comeback album. On July 23, ARrC confirmed to debut with their first EP Ar^c (Note: Read as A-r-squared-c.) on August 19. In particular, the first single "Dummy" would be released on July 26, ahead of their debut.

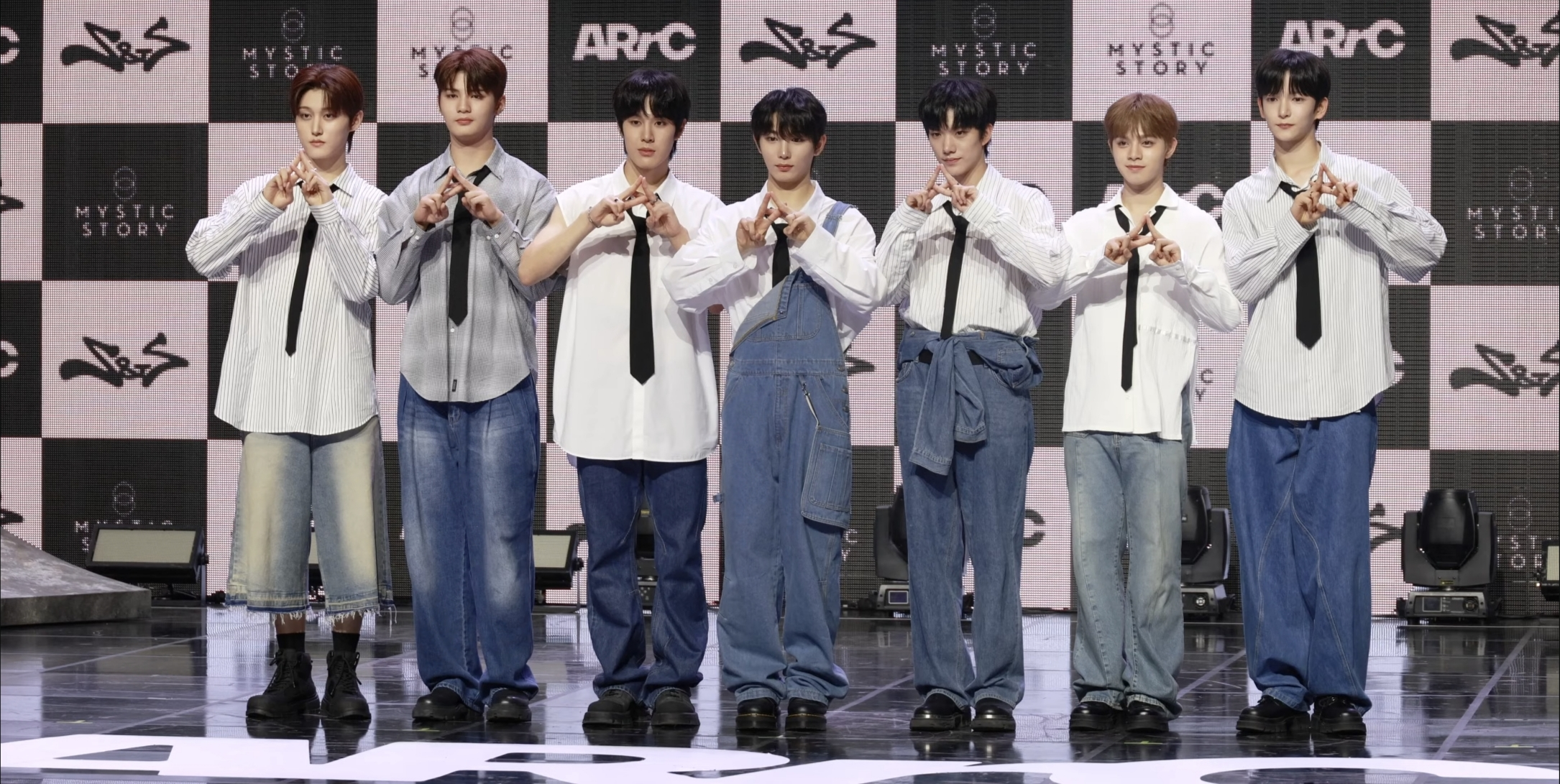
ARrC at their debut showcase in August 2024

In August 2024, ARrC announced "S&S (Sour and Sweet)" as the title track of their debut EP. The group held a global debut show titled ARrC Debut Show: The Real Connection on the day of their debut, where they would reveal the details of their debut EP and stages of the tracks, as well as the debut celebration party. It was broadcast simultaneously on Mnet and M2 YouTube channels.

=== 2025–2026: Ziwoo's departure, Addition of Andy and Nu Kidz: Out the Box, disbandment ===
On January 22, 2025, Mystic Story announced on ARrC's Weverse account that Ziwoo has left the group due to personal reasons. Nine days later, Mystic announced the addition of Andy to the group, who took part in JTBC's survival competition Project 7. In addition, ARrC is preparing to release a new album.

On February 4, 2025, Mystic Story released four various logo teasers that represent the members' places of origin and announced the group's second EP titled Nu Kidz: Out the Box to be released on February 18. The next day, they released a logo sequence and promotional scheduler for the EP. On February 7, ARrC announce "Nu Kidz" as the title track for their second EP.

== Past members ==
- Hyunmin (현민)
- Kien (끼엔)
- Ziwoo (지우)
- Choi Han (최한)
- Andy (앤디)
- Rioto (리오토)
- Doha (도하)
- Jibeen (지빈)

== Discography ==
=== Extended plays ===
List of extended plays, showing selected details, selected chart positions, and sales figures
Title	Details	Peak chart positions	Sales
Title	Details	KOR	Sales
Ar^c	Released: August 19, 2024; Label: Mystic Story; Formats: CD, digital download, streaming; Track listing: 1. "S&S (Sour and Sweet)"; 2. "Light Up"; 3. "Shadow"; 4. "Duality"; 5. "Dummy" (Nu Skull Mix)	10	KOR: 19,204
Nu Kidz: Out the Box	Released: February 18, 2025; Label: Mystic Story; Formats: CD, digital download, streaming; Track listing: 1. "Nu Kidz"; 2. "Loop.dll"; 3. "Accident ~ At the Studio"; 4. "Alien in Seoul"; 5. "Connected"	5	KOR: 20,993
Hope	Released: July 16, 2025; Label: Mystic Story; Formats: CD, digital download, streaming; Track listing: 1. "Awesome"; 2. "Dawns"; 3. "Kick Back"; 4. "Vitamin I"; 5. "Night Life"	27	KOR: 19,004

=== Single albums ===
List of single albums, showing selected details, selected chart positions, and sales figures
Title	Album Details	Peak chart positions	Sales
Title	Album Details	KOR	Sales
Ctrl+Alt+Skiid	Released: November 3, 2025; Label: Mystic Story; Formats: Digital download, streaming	16	KOR: 8,981

=== Singles ===
List of singles, showing year released, selected chart positions, and name of the album
Title	Year	Peak chart positions	Album
Title	Year	KOR Down.	Album
"Dummy"	2024	—	Non-album single
"S&S (Sour and Sweet)"	2024	79	Ar^c
"Nu Kidz"	2025	160	Nu Kidz: Out the Box
"Awesome"	2025	—	Hope
"Skiid"	2025	—	Ctrl+Alt+Skiid
"—" denotes a recording that did not chart or was not released in that territory

=== Other songs ===
List of other songs, showing year released, selected chart positions, and name of the album
Title	Year	Peak chart positions	Album
Title	Year	KOR Down.	Album
"Light Up"	2024	108	Ar^c
"Shadow"	2024	109	Ar^c
"Duality"	2024	110	Ar^c
"Dummy (Nu Skull Mix)"	2024	107	Ar^c

== Videography ==
=== Music videos ===
Music video appearances
Song title	Year	Director(s)	Ref.
"Dummy"	2024	Novv Kim (Novv)	
"S&S (Sour and Sweet)"	2024	Novv Kim (Novv)	
"Nu Kidz"	2025	Mingyu Kang (Gew)	

== Filmography ==
=== Reality shows ===
Reality show appearances
Year	Title	Notes	Ref.
2024	World of ARrC	Pre-debut reality show	
