= Close Your Eyes (group) =

South Korean boy band

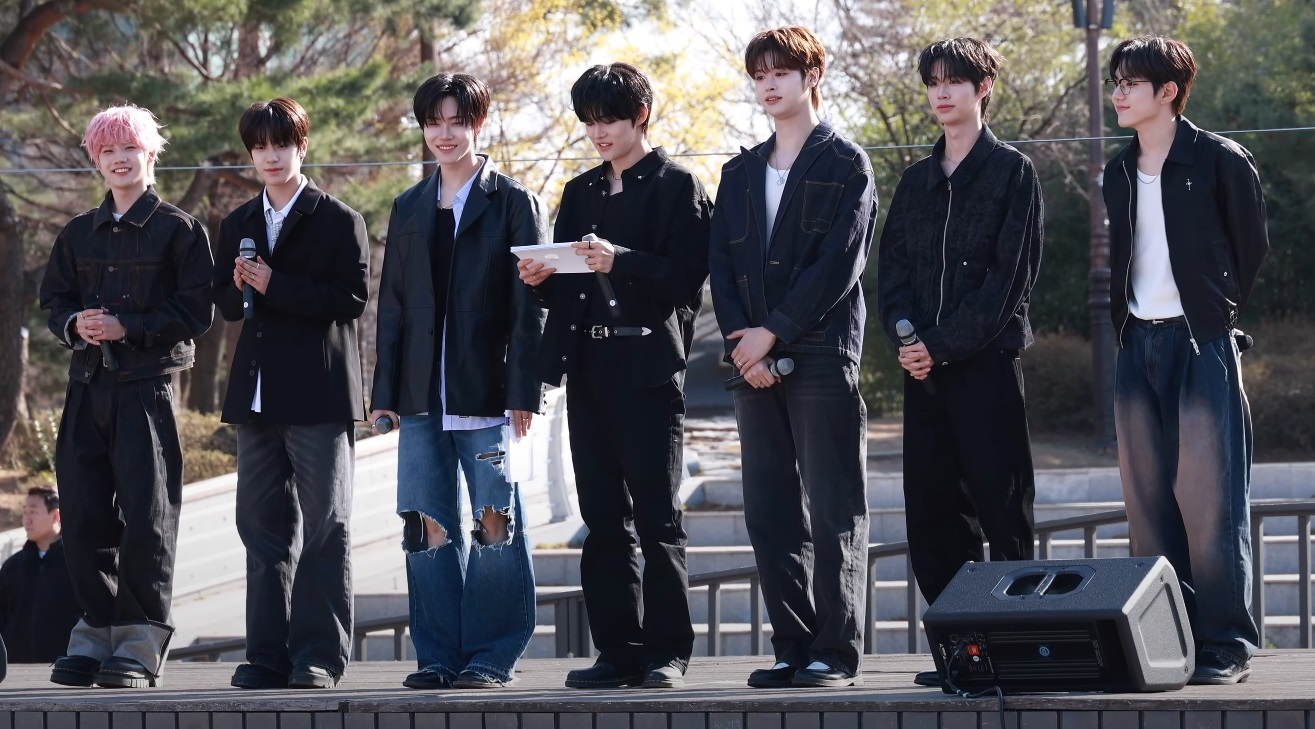
- Close Your Eyes in March 2025; L–R: Kenshin, Seungho, Yeojun, Minwook, Jingxiang, Sungmin, and Kyoungbae

Background information
- Also known as: CYE
- Origin: Seoul, South Korea
- Genre: K-pop
- Years active: 2025–present
- Label: Uncore
- Members: Jeon Min-wook; Ma Jingxiang; Jang Yeo-jun; Kim Sung-min; Song Seung-ho; Kenshin; Seo Kyoung-bae
- Website: Official website

Close Your Eyes (Korean: 클로즈 유어 아이즈; stylized in all caps) is a South Korean boy group formed through JTBC's survival show Project 7 and managed by Uncore. The group consists of seven members: Minwook, Jingxiang, Yeojun, Sungmin, Seungho, Kenshin, and Kyoungbae. They debuted on April 2, 2025, with the extended play (EP) Eternalt.

== History ==
=== Formation through Project 7 and other activities ===
Close Your Eyes was formed through JTBC's reality competition series Project 7, which aired from October 18 to December 27, 2024. The show brought 98 contestants from around the world, primarily in South Korea, China, Hong Kong, Taiwan, Japan, Thailand, Ukraine, the United States, and Australia, to compete and to debut in a multinational boy group. Out of a pool of 200 contestants, only the top seven would make the final lineup. All members were announced in the finale episode, which was broadcast live on December 27, and they'll be active for three years after debut under Uncore, a new label which jointly formed by SLL and YG Plus.

Before appearing on the program, several members had already been active in the entertainment industry. Jeon Min-wook made his debut in the PocketDol Studio boy group BAE173 on November 19, 2020. In 2021, Jang Yeo-jun participated in the MBC survival show Extreme Debut: Wild Idol but was eliminated in the third episode. In 2023, Ma Jingxiang and Yeojun took part in the Mnet reality competition show Boys Planet. Yeojun was eliminated in the fifth episode after ranking 62nd. Subsequently, Ma Jingxiang ranked at 30th place and was eliminated in the eighth episode.

On December 3, the 39th Golden Disc Awards, which took place on January 4–5, 2025, at Mizuho PayPay Dome Fukuoka announced that the 7 members chosen through Project 7 would be part of the show line-up and would perform on the first day of the award show. They performed "Time After Time", one of the original songs from Project 7.

=== 2025: Debut with Eternalt, "Closer Moments", Snowy Summer, Blackout, and "Beyond Your Eyes" ===
On January 21, 2025, it was revealed that they had done their first magazine photoshoot with Cosmopolitan Korea, confirming their debut set for April, which was later confirmed by JTBC.

On March 5, it was announced that they would make their official debut on April 2, with the mini album Eternalt, alongside its lead single "All My Poetry" (내 안의 모든 시와 소설은), with member Minwook credited as a lyricist and composer. The group held a showcase to commemorate their debut and the mini album's release. "All My Poetry" earned Close Your Eyes their first music show trophy 6 days after debut on SBS's The Show on April 8, followed by an additional win on KBS2's Music Bank on April 11.

On April 17, Uncore announced the start of the group's first fanmeeting "Closer Moments" with stops in Seoul, Yokohama, Osaka, Hong Kong, and Taipei in May and June.

On June 21, it was announced that the group's second mini album Snowy Summer would be released on July 9, alongside its similarly titled lead single. "Snowy Summer" earned its first music show trophy on SBS's The Show on July 15, followed by additional wins on MBC M's Show Champion on July 16, and KBS2's Music Bank on July 18.

On October 14, Uncore announced that Close Your Eyes member Kenshin would be temporarily suspending group activities after a visit to the hospital diagnosed him with shingles. The agency stated that they would do its best for the artist's speedy recovery. Close Your Eyes will continue its activities as a six-member group.

On October 22, it was announced that the group's third mini album Blackout would be released on November 11, alongside its lead single "X", with member Minwook credited as a lyricist once more, following the pre-release single "SOB" on October 30. The group held a comeback showcase to commemorate the mini album's release, where member Kenshin, who had previously been on hiatus, made his return to the group, after a period of rest and recovery. "X" earned its first music show trophy on MBC M's Show Champion on November 19.

On December 4, Uncore announced the start of the group's first tour "Beyond Your Eyes" with stops in Seoul, Tokyo, Nagoya, and Osaka in January and February.

=== 2026–present: Overexposed, 256th Note, and "Born An Idol, Want To Date Closer" ===
On February 3, 2026, J&B Entertainment Canada announced that they had signed a contract with the group to bring them to Canada, as part of their "Beyond Your Eyes" tour, with stops in Toronto, Montreal, and Vancouver in May.

On February 19, Uncore announced that Close Your Eyes member Jang Yeo-jun would be taking a temporary hiatus from group activities after a visit to the hospital diagnosed him with rhabdomyolysis. The agency stated that they would provide the utmost care so that the artist may recover. Close Your Eyes will continue its activities as a six-member group for the time being. He resumed daily life and group activities on February 16, after a week-long period of rest and recovery.

On April 9, it was announced that the group's first digital single Overexposed would be released on April 21, alongside its lead single "Pose", with members Minwook and Yeojun credited as lyricists. The two were also credited on the digital single's second track "What If I Miss Love?".

On May 15, right before their "Beyond Your Eyes" tour dates in Canada, J&B Entertainment announced more tour dates for the US, which included stops in Atlanta, Phoenix, Los Angeles, Dallas, Orlando, Chicago, and New York, plus an additionnal stop in Toronto, scheduled for October and November.

On September 7, it was announced that the group's fourth mini album 256th Note would be released on September 30, alongside its lead single "Drop That!", with members Minwook and Seungho credited as lyricists, following the pre-release single "Open Your Eyes" on September 18, which featured members Minwook and Kenshin credited as lyricists. The mini album features 7 tracks, with member Minwook credited as a lyricist on "Baby Bossa Nova", and "Fool For You" alongside members Yeojun and Seungho, and members Sungmin and Kenshin credited as lyricists on "Vibe Check". Meanwhile, all the members were credited as lyricists on the final track "Eternity". "Drop That!" earned its first music show trophy on KBS2's Music Bank on October 9.

On October 12, Uncore announced the start of the group's first fan concert "Born An Idol, Want To Date Closer" with stops in Seoul and Tokyo in November.

== Members ==
- Jeon Min-wook (전민욱)
- Ma Jingxiang (마징시앙)
- Jang Yeo-jun (장여준)
- Kim Sung-min (김성민)
- Song Seung-ho (송승호)
- Kenshin (켄신)
- Seo Kyoung-bae (서경배)

== Discography ==
=== Extended plays ===
List of extended plays, showing selected details, selected chart positions, sales figures, and certifications
Title	Details	Peak chart positions		Sales	Certifications
Title	Details	KOR	JPN	Sales	Certifications
Eternalt	Released: April 2, 2025; Label: Uncore; Formats: CD, digital download, streaming; Track listing: 1. "Close Your Eyes"; 2. "Subtitled"; 3. "All My Poetry"; 4. "How To Dance " 5. "Laid Back"; 6. "To The Woods"; 7. "Stay 4 Good"; 8. "Upside Down"	4	24	KOR: 328,412; JPN: 1,249	
Snowy Summer	Released: July 9, 2025; Label: Uncore; Formats: CD, digital download, streaming; Track listing: 1. "Paint Candy"; 2. "Snowy Summer"; 3. "You"; 4. "Bubble Tea"	5	17	KOR: 203,078; JPN: 3,902	
Blackout	Released: November 11, 2025; Label: Uncore; Formats: CD, digital download, streaming; Track listing: 1. "X"; 2. "SOB"; 3. "Chic"; 4. "2.0"; 5. "Who's Dat? (Jane Doe)"; 6. "X" (English version)	2	—	KOR: 559,210	KMCA: 2× Platinum
256th Note	Released: September 30, 2026; Label: Uncore; Formats: CD, digital download, streaming; Track listing: 1. "Open Your Eyes"; 2. "Drop That!"; 3. "Vibe Check"; 4. "Slowly Bleed"; 5. "Fool for You"; 6. "Baby Bossa Nova"; 7. "Eternity"	1	—	KOR: 633,800	

=== Singles ===
List of singles, showing year released, selected chart positions, and name of the album
Title	Year	Peak chart positions		Album
Title	Year	KOR	KOR DL	Album
"All My Poetry" (내 안의 모든 시와 소설은)	2025	—	3	Eternalt
"Snowy Summer"	2025	184	5	Snowy Summer
"SOB" (featuring Imanbek)	2025	—	69	Blackout
"X"	2025	—	8	Blackout
"Pose" (Note: Digital single: Overexposed)	2026	—	101	Non-album single
"Open Your Eyes"	2026	—	100	256th Note
"Drop That!"	2026	—	11	256th Note
"—" denotes a recording that did not chart.

=== Soundtrack appearances ===
List of soundtrack appearances
Title	Year	Album
"I Got It"	2026	The Judge Returns OST
"Waiting for You"	2026	The Practical Guide to Love OST
"I'm Runnin'"	2026	Reborn Rookie OST

=== Other charted songs ===
List of other charted songs, showing year released, selected chart positions, and name of the album
Title	Year	Peak chart positions	Album
Title	Year	KOR DL	Album
"Close Your Eyes"	2025	65	Eternalt
"Subtitled" (너를 남은 이 영화에 너의 가사가 자막이 돼)	2025	63	Eternalt
"How To Dance" (빗속에서 춤추는 법)	2025	67	Eternalt
"Laid Back" (못 본 척)	2025	76	Eternalt
"To The Woods"	2025	66	Eternalt
"Stay 4 Good"	2025	78	Eternalt
"Upside Down" (사과가 하늘로 떨어진 날)	2025	75	Eternalt
"Paint Candy"	2025	85	Snowy Summer
"You" (ㅠ)	2025	86	Snowy Summer
"Bubble Tea" (왼손에는 버블티)	2025	87	Snowy Summer
"Chic"	2025	80	Blackout
"2.0"	2025	81	Blackout
"Who's Dat? (Jane Doe)"	2025	82	Blackout
"X (English Ver.)"	2025	85	Blackout
"What If I Miss Love?"	2026	117	Non-album singles
"Pose (Spanish Ver.)"	2026	—	Non-album singles
"Vibe Check"	2026	96	256th Note
"Slowly Bleed"	2026	94	256th Note
"Fool for You"	2026	95	256th Note
"Baby Bossa Nova" (featuring Joo Hyelyn)	2026	92	256th Note
"Eternity"	2026	99	256th Note
"—" denotes a recording that did not chart.

== Videography ==
=== Music videos ===
Title	Year	Director(s)	Ref.
"All My Poetry"	2025	Shin Hee-won	
"Snowy Summer"	2025	Shin Hee-won	
"SOB" (featuring Imanbek)	2025	Kim Joo-hyung	
"X"	2025	Yun Joo-yeong	
"Pose"	2026	Shin Hee-won	
"Open Your Eyes"	2026	Jan Lee	
"Drop That!"	2026	Jan Lee	

=== Other videos ===
Title	Year	Director(s)	Notes	Ref.
"All My Poetry"	2025	—	Performance video	
"To The Woods"	2025	S.JIN, FJ Film	Performance video	
"Upside Down"	2025	S.JIN, FJ Film	Performance video	
"Paint Candy"	2025	Yun Jooyeong (Earthluk)	Performance video	
"Snowy Summer"	2025	—	Performance video	
"You" (ㅠ)	2025	S.JIN	Live clip	
"X"	2025	—	Performance video	
"SOB"	2025	Bico Lim	Performance video	
"Pose (Spanish Ver.)"	2026	—	Special clip	

== Live performances ==
=== Concerts and tours ===
Date	City	Country	Venue	Performed song(s)	Ref.
Close Your Eyes 1st Fanmeeting [Closer Moments]
May 24, 2025	Seoul	South Korea	BlueSquare SOL Travel Hall	"Run to You" (Project 7 cover); "Upside Down"; "Siren" (Riize cover); "To The Woods"; "All My Poetry"; "How To Dance"; "Hard to Say" (Karencici cover) (Note: This cover was only performed at the Taipei stop.); "Stay 4 Good"	
May 25, 2025	Seoul	South Korea	BlueSquare SOL Travel Hall	"Run to You" (Project 7 cover); "Upside Down"; "Siren" (Riize cover); "To The Woods"; "All My Poetry"; "How To Dance"; "Hard to Say" (Karencici cover); "Stay 4 Good"	
June 1, 2025	Yokohama	Japan	Pacifico Yokohama	"Run to You" (Project 7 cover); "Upside Down"; "Siren" (Riize cover); "To The Woods"; "All My Poetry"; "How To Dance"; "Hard to Say" (Karencici cover); "Stay 4 Good"	
June 14, 2025	Osaka	Japan	Minoh Theatre for Performing Arts	"Run to You" (Project 7 cover); "Upside Down"; "Siren" (Riize cover); "To The Woods"; "All My Poetry"; "How To Dance"; "Hard to Say" (Karencici cover); "Stay 4 Good"	
June 21, 2025	Hong Kong		AXA Dreamland	"Run to You" (Project 7 cover); "Upside Down"; "Siren" (Riize cover); "To The Woods"; "All My Poetry"; "How To Dance"; "Hard to Say" (Karencici cover); "Stay 4 Good"	
June 28, 2025	Taipei	Taiwan	Taipei International Convention Center	"Run to You" (Project 7 cover); "Upside Down"; "Siren" (Riize cover); "To The Woods"; "All My Poetry"; "How To Dance"; "Hard to Say" (Karencici cover); "Stay 4 Good"	
Close Your Eyes 1st Tour [Beyond Your Eyes] (Note: The stops on March 28 in Kuala Lumpur, Malaysia and August 28 and 30 in Surabaya/Jakarta, Indonesia were cancelled due to local circumstances and safety considerations, respectively.)
January 31, 2026	Seoul	South Korea	Olympic Hall	"Close Your Eyes"; "X"; "2.0"; "To The Woods"; "Who's Dat? (Jane Doe)"; "Nameless (John Doe)" (Note: Unreleased song, Jeon Min-wook, Ma Jingxiang, Jang Yeo-jun, Kim Sung-min); "Lemonade" (Note: Unreleased song, Song Seung-ho, Kenshin, Seo Kyoung-bae); "Best Life" (Note: Unreleased song); "Paint Candy"; "All My Poetry"; "How To Dance"; "Upside Down"; "Snowy Summer"; "Bubble Tea"; "You"; "Laid Back"; "Chic"; "SOB"; "Stay 4 Good"; "Subtitled"	
February 1, 2026	Seoul	South Korea	Olympic Hall	"Close Your Eyes"; "X"; "2.0"; "To The Woods"; "Who's Dat? (Jane Doe)"; "Nameless (John Doe)"; "Lemonade"; "Best Life"; "Paint Candy"; "All My Poetry"; "How To Dance"; "Upside Down"; "Snowy Summer"; "Bubble Tea"; "You"; "Laid Back"; "Chic"; "SOB"; "Stay 4 Good"; "Subtitled"	
February 10, 2026	Tokyo	Japan	Zepp Divercity	"Close Your Eyes"; "X"; "2.0"; "To The Woods"; "Who's Dat? (Jane Doe)"; "Nameless (John Doe)"; "Lemonade"; "Best Life"; "Paint Candy"; "All My Poetry"; "How To Dance"; "Upside Down"; "Snowy Summer"; "Bubble Tea"; "You"; "Laid Back"; "Chic"; "SOB"; "Stay 4 Good"; "Subtitled"	
February 11, 2026	Tokyo	Japan	Zepp Divercity	"Close Your Eyes"; "X"; "2.0"; "To The Woods"; "Who's Dat? (Jane Doe)"; "Nameless (John Doe)"; "Lemonade"; "Best Life"; "Paint Candy"; "All My Poetry"; "How To Dance"; "Upside Down"; "Snowy Summer"; "Bubble Tea"; "You"; "Laid Back"; "Chic"; "SOB"; "Stay 4 Good"; "Subtitled"	
February 13, 2026	Nagoya	Japan	Zepp Nagoya	"Close Your Eyes"; "X"; "2.0"; "To The Woods"; "Who's Dat? (Jane Doe)"; "Nameless (John Doe)"; "Lemonade"; "Best Life"; "Paint Candy"; "All My Poetry"; "How To Dance"; "Upside Down"; "Snowy Summer"; "Bubble Tea"; "You"; "Laid Back"; "Chic"; "SOB"; "Stay 4 Good"; "Subtitled"	
February 15, 2026	Osaka	Japan	Zepp Osaka Bayside	"Close Your Eyes"; "X"; "2.0"; "To The Woods"; "Who's Dat? (Jane Doe)"; "Nameless (John Doe)"; "Lemonade"; "Best Life"; "Paint Candy"; "All My Poetry"; "How To Dance"; "Upside Down"; "Snowy Summer"; "Bubble Tea"; "You"; "Laid Back"; "Chic"; "SOB"; "Stay 4 Good"; "Subtitled"	
April 11, 2026	Moscow	Russia	VK Stadium	"Close Your Eyes"; "X"; "2.0"; "To The Woods"; "Who's Dat? (Jane Doe)"; "Nameless (John Doe)"; "Lemonade"; "Best Life"; "Paint Candy"; "All My Poetry"; "How To Dance"; "Upside Down"; "Snowy Summer"; "Bubble Tea"; "You"; "Laid Back"; "Chic"; "SOB"; "Stay 4 Good"; "Subtitled"	
May 22, 2026	Toronto	Canada	Bluma Appel Theatre	"Close Your Eyes"; "X"; "2.0"; "Pose"; "To The Woods"; "Who's Dat? (Jane Doe)"; "Nameless (John Doe)"; "Lemonade"; "Best Life"; "Paint Candy"; "All My Poetry"; "How To Dance" (Note: How To Dance was not performed at the Montreal and Vancouver stops in May.); "Upside Down"; "Snowy Summer"; "What If I Miss Love?"; "Bubble Tea"; "You"; "Laid Back" (Note: Upside Down, Snowy Summer, What If I Miss Love?, You, and Laid Back were only performed at the Hong Kong and Macau stops.); "Chic"; "SOB"; "Stay 4 Good"; "Subtitled"	
May 24, 2026	Montreal	Canada	Rialto Theatre	"Close Your Eyes"; "X"; "2.0"; "Pose"; "To The Woods"; "Who's Dat? (Jane Doe)"; "Nameless (John Doe)"; "Lemonade"; "Best Life"; "Paint Candy"; "All My Poetry"; "How To Dance"; "Upside Down"; "Snowy Summer"; "What If I Miss Love?"; "Bubble Tea"; "You"; "Laid Back"; "Chic"; "SOB"; "Stay 4 Good"; "Subtitled"	
May 26, 2026	Vancouver	Canada	River Rock Theatre	"Close Your Eyes"; "X"; "2.0"; "Pose"; "To The Woods"; "Who's Dat? (Jane Doe)"; "Nameless (John Doe)"; "Lemonade"; "Best Life"; "Paint Candy"; "All My Poetry"; "How To Dance"; "Upside Down"; "Snowy Summer"; "What If I Miss Love?"; "Bubble Tea"; "You"; "Laid Back"; "Chic"; "SOB"; "Stay 4 Good"; "Subtitled"	
May 30, 2026	Hong Kong		AsiaWorld–Expo	"Close Your Eyes"; "X"; "2.0"; "Pose"; "To The Woods"; "Who's Dat? (Jane Doe)"; "Nameless (John Doe)"; "Lemonade"; "Best Life"; "Paint Candy"; "All My Poetry"; "How To Dance"; "Upside Down"; "Snowy Summer"; "What If I Miss Love?"; "Bubble Tea"; "You"; "Laid Back"; "Chic"; "SOB"; "Stay 4 Good"; "Subtitled"	
September 12, 2026	Macau		Broadway Theatre, Broadway Macau	"Close Your Eyes"; "X"; "2.0"; "Pose"; "To The Woods"; "Who's Dat? (Jane Doe)"; "Nameless (John Doe)"; "Lemonade"; "Best Life"; "Paint Candy"; "All My Poetry"; "How To Dance"; "Upside Down"; "Snowy Summer"; "What If I Miss Love?"; "Bubble Tea"; "You"; "Laid Back"; "Chic"; "SOB"; "Stay 4 Good"; "Subtitled"	
October 21, 2026	Atlanta	United States	Variety Playhouse	"Close Your Eyes"; "X"; "2.0"; "Pose"; "To The Woods"; "Open Your Eyes"; "All My Poetry"; "How To Dance"; "Upside Down"; "Snowy Summer"; "What If I Miss Love?"; "Bubble Tea"; "You"; "Laid Back"; "Chic"; "SOB"; "Drop That!"; "Stay 4 Good"; "Subtitled"	
October 23, 2026	Phoenix	United States	Higley Center for the Performing Arts	"Close Your Eyes"; "X"; "2.0"; "Pose"; "To The Woods"; "Open Your Eyes"; "All My Poetry"; "How To Dance"; "Upside Down"; "Snowy Summer"; "What If I Miss Love?"; "Bubble Tea"; "You"; "Laid Back"; "Chic"; "SOB"; "Drop That!"; "Stay 4 Good"; "Subtitled"	
October 25, 2026	Los Angeles	United States	The Vermont Hollywood	"Close Your Eyes"; "X"; "2.0"; "Pose"; "To The Woods"; "Open Your Eyes"; "All My Poetry"; "How To Dance"; "Upside Down"; "Snowy Summer"; "What If I Miss Love?"; "Bubble Tea"; "You"; "Laid Back"; "Chic"; "SOB"; "Drop That!"; "Stay 4 Good"; "Subtitled"	
October 27, 2026	Dallas	United States	South Side Music Hall	"Close Your Eyes"; "X"; "2.0"; "Pose"; "To The Woods"; "Open Your Eyes"; "All My Poetry"; "How To Dance"; "Upside Down"; "Snowy Summer"; "What If I Miss Love?"; "Bubble Tea"; "You"; "Laid Back"; "Chic"; "SOB"; "Drop That!"; "Stay 4 Good"; "Subtitled"	
October 29, 2026	Orlando	United States	The Plaza Live	"Close Your Eyes"; "X"; "2.0"; "Pose"; "To The Woods"; "Open Your Eyes"; "All My Poetry"; "How To Dance"; "Upside Down"; "Snowy Summer"; "What If I Miss Love?"; "Bubble Tea"; "You"; "Laid Back"; "Chic"; "SOB"; "Drop That!"; "Stay 4 Good"; "Subtitled"	
October 31, 2026	Chicago	United States	Athenaeum Center	"Close Your Eyes"; "X"; "2.0"; "Pose"; "To The Woods"; "Open Your Eyes"; "All My Poetry"; "How To Dance"; "Upside Down"; "Snowy Summer"; "What If I Miss Love?"; "Bubble Tea"; "You"; "Laid Back"; "Chic"; "SOB"; "Drop That!"; "Stay 4 Good"; "Subtitled"	
November 2, 2026	New York	United States	Melrose Ballroom	"Close Your Eyes"; "X"; "2.0"; "Pose"; "To The Woods"; "Open Your Eyes"; "All My Poetry"; "How To Dance"; "Upside Down"; "Snowy Summer"; "What If I Miss Love?"; "Bubble Tea"; "You"; "Laid Back"; "Chic"; "SOB"; "Drop That!"; "Stay 4 Good"; "Subtitled"	
November 4, 2026	Toronto	Canada	Phoenix Concert Theatre	"Close Your Eyes"; "X"; "2.0"; "Pose"; "To The Woods"; "Open Your Eyes"; "All My Poetry"; "How To Dance"; "Upside Down"; "Snowy Summer"; "What If I Miss Love?"; "Bubble Tea"; "You"; "Laid Back"; "Chic"; "SOB"; "Drop That!"; "Stay 4 Good"; "Subtitled"	
2026 Close Your Eyes Fancon <Born An Idol, Want To Date Closer>
November 20, 2026	Seoul	South Korea	COEX Artium Woori Bank Hall	"Open Your Eyes"; "Drop That!"; "X"; "2.0"; "Twinkle Twinkle" (Girl's Day cover); "Mr." (Kara cover); "Snowy Summer"; "To The Woods"; "Run to You" (Project 7 cover); "Best Life"; "Laid Back"; "All My Poetry"; "Upside Down"; "You"; "Paint Candy"; "Slowly Bleed"; "How To Dance"	
November 21, 2026	Seoul	South Korea	COEX Artium Woori Bank Hall	"Open Your Eyes"; "Drop That!"; "X"; "2.0"; "Twinkle Twinkle" (Girl's Day cover); "Mr." (Kara cover); "Snowy Summer"; "To The Woods"; "Run to You" (Project 7 cover); "Best Life"; "Laid Back"; "All My Poetry"; "Upside Down"; "You"; "Paint Candy"; "Slowly Bleed"; "How To Dance"	
November 22, 2026	Seoul	South Korea	COEX Artium Woori Bank Hall	"Open Your Eyes"; "Drop That!"; "X"; "2.0"; "Twinkle Twinkle" (Girl's Day cover); "Mr." (Kara cover); "Snowy Summer"; "To The Woods"; "Run to You" (Project 7 cover); "Best Life"; "Laid Back"; "All My Poetry"; "Upside Down"; "You"; "Paint Candy"; "Slowly Bleed"; "How To Dance"	
November 28, 2026	Tokyo	Japan	Shinjuku Bunka Center		

=== Music festivals ===
Event	Date	Location (Note: Venue, City, Country)	Performed song(s)	Ref.
2025 SBS Gayo Daejeon Summer	July 27, 2025	KINTEX, Goyang, South Korea	"Paint Candy"	
Ulsan Summer Festival 2025	August 4, 2025	Ulsan Stadium, Ulsan, South Korea	"Paint Candy"	
The Performance Zero 2025	October 5, 2025	Zepp Haneda, Tokyo, Japan	"Snowy Summer"; "All My Poetry"; "You"; "To The Woods"; "Paint Candy"	
2025 KBS Song Festival	December 19, 2025	Songdo Convensia, Incheon, South Korea	"Fire" (BTS cover, (Note: Jeon Min-wook, Ma Jingxiang, Song Seung-ho, Seo Kyoung-bae) with AHOF (Note: Steven, Park Han, JL, and Park Ju-won)); "SOB"	
Inkigayo ON THE GO 2026	April 26, 2026	Paradise City, Incheon, South Korea	"Pose"	
ACON 2026	July 25, 2026	NTSU Arena, Taipei, Taiwan	"Intro"; "X"; "Pose"; "Overdose" (Exo cover); "Chic"; "SOB"; "Dangerous + Beat It + Thriller (Michael Jackson cover, (Note: Jang Yeo-jun, Song Seung-ho, Seo Kyoung-bae) with Nexz (Note: Tomoya, Yu, and Haru))	
NOL Festival 2026	October 17, 2026	KINTEX, Goyang, South Korea	"Drop That!"; "Open Your Eyes"; "SOB"	

=== Awards shows ===
Event	Date	Venue	Performed song(s)	Ref.
39th Golden Disc Awards	January 5, 2025	Mizuho PayPay Dome, Fukuoka, Japan	"Time After Time" (Project 7 cover)	
TMElive International Music Awards 2025	August 22, 2025	Galaxy Arena, Macau, China	"Paint Candy"; "All My Poetry'"; "To The Woods"; "Snowy Summer"	
The Fact Music Awards 2025	September 20, 2025	Macao Outdoor Performance Venue, Macau, China	"Hot" (Seventeen cover); "Paint Candy"; "Outro Performance" (with AHOF)	
TikTok Awards 2025	October 25, 2025	Korea University, Seoul, South Korea	"Close Your Eyes"; "To The Woods"; "How to Dance	
2025 Korea Grand Music Awards	November 15, 2025	Inspire Arena, Incheon, South Korea	"X"; "SOB" (KGMA ver.); "Boy In Luv" (BTS cover)	
40th Golden Disc Awards	January 10, 2026	Taipei Dome, Taipei, Taiwan	"Close Your Eyes" (Intro); "X"; "SOB"; "Lies" (BigBang cover)	
35th Seoul Music Awards	June 20, 2026	Inspire Arena, Incheon, South Korea	"Intro"; "Pose"; "X"; "Overdose" (Exo cover); "We Are The Future" (H.O.T. cover, (Note: Jeon Min-wook, Kenshin, Seo Kyoung-bae) with Idid (Note: Jang Yong-hoon, Kim Min-jae, and Baek Jun-hyuk) and Idntt (Note: Towa, Kim Seong-jun and Han Ye-joon))	
2026 SPOTV K-Pop Awards	September 6, 2026	KINTEX, Goyang, South Korea	"Intro" (Note: Kenshin); "SOB"; "Dance Break"	
The Fact Music Awards 2026	September 19, 2026	Busan Asiad Main Stadium, Busan, South Korea	"Beat It Up" (NCT Dream cover); "Open Your Eyes"; "Drop That!" (D.B Ver.)	
2026 Korea Grand Music Awards	November 7, 2026	Gocheok Sky Dome, Seoul, South Korea	"Intro"; "Drop That!; "No Doubt" (Enhypen cover)	
11th Asia Artist Awards	December 6, 2026	Kaohsiung National Stadium, Kaohsiung, Taiwan	TBA	

== Filmography ==
=== Television shows ===
Year	Title	Notes	Ref.
2024	Project 7	Reality competition show determining Close Your Eyes members	

=== Web shows ===
Year	Title	Notes	Ref.
2025	Close to Close Your Eyes	Reality show	

== Awards and nominations ==
Name of the award ceremony, year presented, award category, nominee(s) and the result of the award
Award ceremony	Year	Category	Nominee/work	Result	Ref.
D Awards	2026	Dreams Silver Label	Close Your Eyes	Won	
Golden Disc Awards	2025	Golden Choice	Close Your Eyes	Won	
Golden Disc Awards	2025	Most Popular Artist – Male	Close Your Eyes	Nominated	
Golden Disc Awards	2025	Rookie Artist of the Year	Close Your Eyes	Nominated	
Hanteo Music Awards	2025	Best Popular Artist	Close Your Eyes	Nominated	
Hanteo Music Awards	2025	Best Global Popular Artist	Close Your Eyes	Nominated	
Hanteo Music Awards	2025	Best Continent Artist – Africa	Close Your Eyes	Nominated	
Hanteo Music Awards	2025	Best Continent Artist – Asia	Close Your Eyes	Nominated	
Hanteo Music Awards	2025	Best Continent Artist – Europe	Close Your Eyes	Nominated	
Hanteo Music Awards	2025	Best Continent Artist – North America	Close Your Eyes	Nominated	
Hanteo Music Awards	2025	Best Continent Artist – Oceania	Close Your Eyes	Nominated	
Hanteo Music Awards	2025	Best Continent Artist – South America	Close Your Eyes	Nominated	
Hanteo Music Awards	2025	Rookie of the Year	Close Your Eyes	Nominated	
Hanteo Music Awards	2025	WhosFandom Award	Close Your Eyes	Nominated	
K-World Dream Awards	2025	New Vision	Close Your Eyes	Won	
MAMA Awards	2025	Artist of the Year	Close Your Eyes	Nominated	
MAMA Awards	2025	Best New Artist	Close Your Eyes	Nominated	
MAMA Awards	2025	Fans' Choice Top 10 – Male	Close Your Eyes	Nominated	
