= The Gentlemen's League =

South Korean TV program

- Season 4 Promotional poster
- Hangul: 뭉쳐야 찬다
- RR: Mungcheoya chanda
- MR: Mungch'ŏya ch'anda
- Genre: Reality television Variety show Soccer
- Written by: Mo Eun-seol (Season 4)
- Directed by: Sung Si-kyung (Season 4)
- Starring: Kim Sung-joo; Kim Young-man; Ahn Jung-hwan; Kim Nam-il; Lee Dong-gook; Koo Ja-cheol
- Country of origin: South Korea
- Original language: Korean
- No. of seasons: 4
- No. of episodes: 298

Production
- Running time: 90-120 minutes
- Production companies: Studio Ah Yeah JoongAng Co., Ltd.

Original release
- Network: JTBC
- Release: June 13, 2019 – February 1, 2026

The Gentlemen's League (Korean: 뭉쳐야 찬다; RR: Mungcheoya chanda), also known as Let's Play Soccer, is a South Korean television entertainment program produced by Studio Ah Yeah JoongAng broadcast on JTBC every Sunday.

The first season premiered on June 13, 2019, until January 31, 2021, airing at 19:40 (KST). The second season aired from August 8, 2021, to September 3, 2023, at 20:20 (KST). The third season premiered on October 8, 2023, until February 2, 2025, at 19:10 (KST). The fourth season premiered on April 6, 2025, and has been airing at 19:10 (KST) until February 1, 2026.

The show was also made available on Netflix from Season 2 to Season 3.

== Synopsis ==
Season 1

The Legends soccer team was formed mainly from retired professional athletes, each a legend in their respective field, to challenge younger teams.

Season 2

The team reformed and included current or retired athletes from unpopular sports outside of soccer to train and challenge the best amateur soccer teams from each region in South Korea.

Season 3

The team organized A-match competitions against countries strong in amateur soccer, traveling to compete in Germany, Netherlands, and Japan. Afterwards, the team was reformed by adding non-athlete members and conquest against the top 100 amateur soccer teams in South Korea.

Season 4

They established their own league, called the Fantasy League, consisting of four teams managed by former professional soccer players and coaches, including Ahn Jung-hwan, Park Hang-seo, Kim Nam-il, and Lee Dong-gook. The teams competed for the top position in the league to win World Cup 2026 tickets.

== Cast ==
=== Host ===
The host presents the program and also provides match commentary, with Cho Won-hee contributing commentary in Seasons 2–3. Managers contributing commentary in Season 4.

Name	Season 1	Season 2	Season 3	Season 4
Host
Kim Sung-joo	All episodes			
Kim Yong-man	All episodes			
Jung Hyung-don	All episodes	Ep. 1–5		
Manager / Coach
Ahn Jung-hwan	All episodes			All episodes
Lee Dong-gook		All episodes		All episodes
Cho Won-hee		Ep. 30–108	All episodes	All episodes
Kim Nam-il			Ep. 8–66	All episodes
Park Hang-seo			Ep. 1–2, 15–17	Ep. 1–26
Koo Ja-cheol				Ep. 29–42

=== Players ===
==== Season 1 ====
The team consists of former athletes who are legends in their respective sports, with Ahn Jung-hwan serving as the team's manager.

Eeojjeoda FC
Number	Position	Name	Occupation	Notes
2		Ha Tae-kwon	Badminton	
3		Lee Hyung-taik	Tennis	
5		Jin Jong-oh	Shooting	
7		Yeo Hong-chul	Gymnastics	
8		Kim Dong-hyun	MMA/Martial Arts	
9		Choi Byung-chul	Fencing	
10		Yang Joon-hyuk	Baseball	
11		Park Tae-hwan	Swimming	
18		Kim Byung-hyun	Baseball	
19		Kim Yong-man	Entertainment	
25		Kim Yo-han	Volleyball	
28		Kim Sung-joo	Entertainment	
41		Lee Bong-ju	Track and Field	
45		Lee Yong-dae	Badminton	
49		Lee Man-ki	Ssireum	
55		Sim Kwon-ho	Wrestling	
77		Lee Dae-hoon	Taekwondo	
88		Kim Jae-yup	Judo	
89		Mo Tae-bum	Ice Skating	
90		Heo Jae	Basketball	
99		Jung Hyung-don	Entertainment	

==== Season 2 ====
The team consists of current or former athletes from unpopular sports outside of soccer, with Ahn Jung-hwan as a manager and Lee Dong-gook as a head coach. Cho Won-hee joined as a defensive coach in episode 30.

Eeojjeoda Avengers
Number	Position	Name	Occupation	Notes
1	CB	Kim Tae-sul	Basketball	
3	GK	Lee Hyung-taik	Tennis	
4	CB	Lee Jang-kun	Kabaddi	
5	GK	Kim Yo-han	Volleyball	
6	WFW	Lee Ji-hwan	Karate	
7	FW	Yoon Dong-sik	Judo	Withdrew from the show due to injury.
7	WFW	Lee Jun-yi	Rugby	
8	GK	Kim Dong-hyun	MMA / Martial arts	
9	WB	Cho Won-woo	Yachting	
10	WB	Mo Tae-bum	Speed skating	
11	FW	Park Tae-hwan	Swimming	
12	FW	Kim Hyeon-woo	Wrestling	
14	WFW	Jang Jeong-min	Rugby	
15	CB	Andre Jin	Rugby	
19	FW	Kim Yong-sik	Taekwondo	
20	MF	Heo Min-ho	Triathlon	
21	MF	Kim Jun-ho	Fencing	
22	FW	Lim Nam-kyu	Luge	
23	GK	Han Geon-gyu	Rugby	
63	MF	Kang Chil-ku	Ski jumping	
77	MF	Lee Dae-hoon	Taekwondo	
79	CB	Park Je-un	Nordic combined	
88	MF	Park Jun-yong	MMA / Martial arts	
92	WB	Kim Jun-hyeon	Skeleton	
99	FW	Ryoo Eun-gyoo	Lacrosse	

==== Season 3 ====
The team consists of current or former athletes from unpopular sports outside of soccer, with Ahn Jung-hwan as a manager and Cho Won-hee as a coach. Kim Nam-il joined as a special coach in episode 8 and officially became a permanent member as a head coach. The team reformed by adding non-athlete members in episode 36.

Eeojjeoda Avengers (Episode 1-35)
Number	Position	Name	Occupation	Notes
3	DF	Sim Jae-bok	Handball	
4	DF	Lee Jang-kun	Kabaddi	
7	FW	Lee Jun-yi	Rugby	
8	GK	Kim Dong-hyun	MMA / Martial arts	
9	DF	Cho Won-woo	Yachting	
10	DF	Mo Tae-bum	Speed skating	
12	FW	Kim Hyeon-woo	Wrestling	
14	FW	Jang Jeong-min	Rugby	
20	MF, DF	Heo Min-ho	Triathlon	Captain (Episode 13–35)
21	MF	Kim Jun-ho	Fencing	
22	FW	Lim Nam-kyu	Luge	
23	GK	Han Geon-gyu	Rugby	
55	DF	Kang Hyun-seok	Lacrosse	
58	DF	Nam Hee-doo	Ice hockey	
66	DF	Seong Jin-soo	Modern pentathlon	
77	MF	Lee Dae-hoon	Taekwondo	
79	DF	Park Je-un	Nordic combined	
88	DF	Park Jun-yong	MMA / Martial arts	
94	MF	Kim Tae-hun	Taekwondo	
99	FW	Ryoo Eun-gyoo	Lacrosse	
Eeojjeoda New Avengers (Episode 36-66)
1	GK	Bang Tae-hoon	Idol	
3	MF, DF	Heo Min-ho	Triathlon	
5	DF	Hong Beom-seok	Influencer	
7	DF	Ma Sun-ho	Bodybuilder	
8	GK	Kim Dong-hyun	MMA / Martial arts	
9	FW	Lee Seok-chan	Model	
10	MF	Kim Jae-hwan	Singer	
11	FW	Jung Dae-jin	Sports model	
13	DF	Woodie Gochild	Singer	
15	FW	Kwak Beom	Comedian	
18	FW	Lee Jun-yi	Rugby	
19	DF	Yang Jun-beom	Actor	Captain (Episode 41–66)
20	FW	Choi Guevara	Model	
22	FW	Lim Nam-kyu	Luge	
24	MF	Han Seung-woo	Singer	
28	MF	Nam Woo-hyun	Singer	
29	GK	Cha Joo-wan	Actor	
31	DF	Cho Jin-se	Comedian	
34	MF	Kim Jin-jja	Creator	
42	DF	Choi Jong-woo	Influencer	
55	DF	Kang Hyun-seok	Lacrosse	
77	MF	Lee Dae-hoon	Taekwondo	
99	FW	Ryoo Eun-gyoo	Lacrosse	

==== Season 4 ====
They compete in the league, called the Fantasy League. They are divided into four teams, FC Hwantasystar, SSakssuri United, Lion Hearts FC, and FC Captain (former FC Papaclaus) through a player draft system.

FC Hwantasystar

- Manager : Ahn Jung-hwan
- Coach : Cho Won-hee

FC Hwantasystar
Number	Position	Name	Occupation	Notes
1	GK	Bang Tae-hoon	Idol	
4	DF	Han Hyun-min	Model	
5	DF	Hong Beom-seok	Creator	
7	MF	Khan	Rapper	
8	MF	Ma Sun-ho	Creator	
9	FW	Jung Seung-hwan	Singer	
10	FW	Choi Guevara	Model	
11	FW	Modern Tarzan	Creator	
14	MF	Cha Seo-won	Actor	
16	DF	Oh Jae-hyun	Model	
23	DF	Kang Ri-han	Model, Actor	
26	FW	Seunghoon	Idol	
27	DF	Ha Jun	Actor	
52	GK	Lee Seok-ki	Model, Actor	
77	DF	Lee Dae-hoon	Former Taekwondo National team	
99	FW	Ryoo Eun-gyoo	Lacrosse National team	Captain
100	FW	Kwon Hwa-un	Actor	

Ssakssuri United

- Manager : Kim Nam-il
- Coach : Lee Tae-woo

Ssakssuri United
Number	Position	Name	Occupation	Notes
2	DF	Roh Yoon-ha	Rapper	
3	DF	Lee Jong-hyun	Actor	
4	DF	Kim Su-gyeom	Actor	
5	DF	Lee Ho-yeon	Model	
6	MF	Won Hyuk	Idol	
7	FW	Serim	Idol	
8	DF	Han Seung-woo	Idol	
9	FW	Bang Ye-dam	Singer	
10	FW	Park Seung-hoon	Model	
11	MF	Yoon Sang-hyun	Actor	
13	FW	Baek Seung-ryeol	Band	
14	MF	Cheon Ju-an	Actor	
15	FW	Kwak Beom	Comedian	
18	GK	Roh Ji-hoon	Singer	
19	DF	Cho Won-woo	Sailing National team	
19	MF	Kim Ru-i	Actor	
66	DF	Choi Ung-hee	Band	
77	FW	Kim Kang-min	Actor	
88	FW	Lee Ji-hoon	Actor	Captain
00	GK	Lee Ji-han	Actor, Model	

Lion Hearts FC

- Manager : Lee Dong-gook
- Coach : Cho Sung-hwan

Lion Hearts FC
Number	Position	Name	Occupation	Notes
1	GK	Song Ha-bin	Comedian	
3	DF	Han Eun-seong	Actor	
4	DF	Lee Jang-kun	Kabaddi National team	
5	DF	Kang Hyun-seok	Lacrosse National team	
7	MF	Nam Woo-hyun	Idol	
8	MF	Baek Sung-hyun	Actor	
9	FW	Xiumin	Idol	
10	MF	Choi Han-bin	Idol	
14	MF	Hikari	Idol	
18	MF	Moon Ji-hoo	Actor	
20	FW	Lee Sin-ki	Actor	
23	FW	Lee Yong-woo	Influencer	
34	MF	Kim Jin-jja	Creator	Captain
38	DF	Agent H	Creator	
40	MF	Choi Jong-woo	Influencer	
77	FW	MJ	Idol	

FC Captain

The team was originally named FC Papaclaus, managed by Park Hang-seo with Park Sung-bae serving as the coach. In Episode 26, it was reported that Park Hang-seo resigned due to conflicting schedules. Koo Ja-cheol took over the team and renamed it to FC Captain.

- Manager : Koo Ja-cheol
- Coach : Lee Seul-gi

FC Captain
Number	Position	Name	Occupation	Notes
4	DF	Heo Min-ho	Triathlete	
5	DF	Cha Sun-woo	Actor	
7	FW	Kaogaii	Rapper	
8	MF	Lee Chan-hyeong	Actor	Captain
9	FW	Lee Seok-chan	Model	
10	FW	Lim Nam-kyu	Former Luge National Team	
12	DF	Hui	Idol	Withdrew from the show due to injury.
13	DF	Cho Jin-se	Comedian	Withdrew from the show due to injury.
19	DF	Yang Jun-beom	Actor	
20	FW	Shin Hyun-soo	Actor	
23	MF	Wootae	Dancer	
29	GK	Cha Joo-wan	Actor	
31	FW	Seo Eun-kwang	Idol	
31	MF	Shin Woo-jae	Artist	
36	MF	Choi Nak-ta	Singer	
77	MF	Ha Sung-woon	Idol	
88	DF	Horseking	Creator	
96	DF	Lee Seung-chan	Model	

== Episodes ==
=== Series overview ===
Season	Episodes	Originally aired		Time Slot (KST)
Season	Episodes	First aired	Last aired	Time Slot (KST)
1	82	June 13, 2019	January 31, 2021	Sunday 19:40
2	108	August 8, 2021	September 3, 2023	Sunday 20:20
3	66	October 8, 2023	February 2, 2025	Sunday at 19:10
4	42	April 6, 2025	February 1, 2026	Sunday at 19:10
