= Park Je-un =

South Korean Nordic combined skier (born 1993)

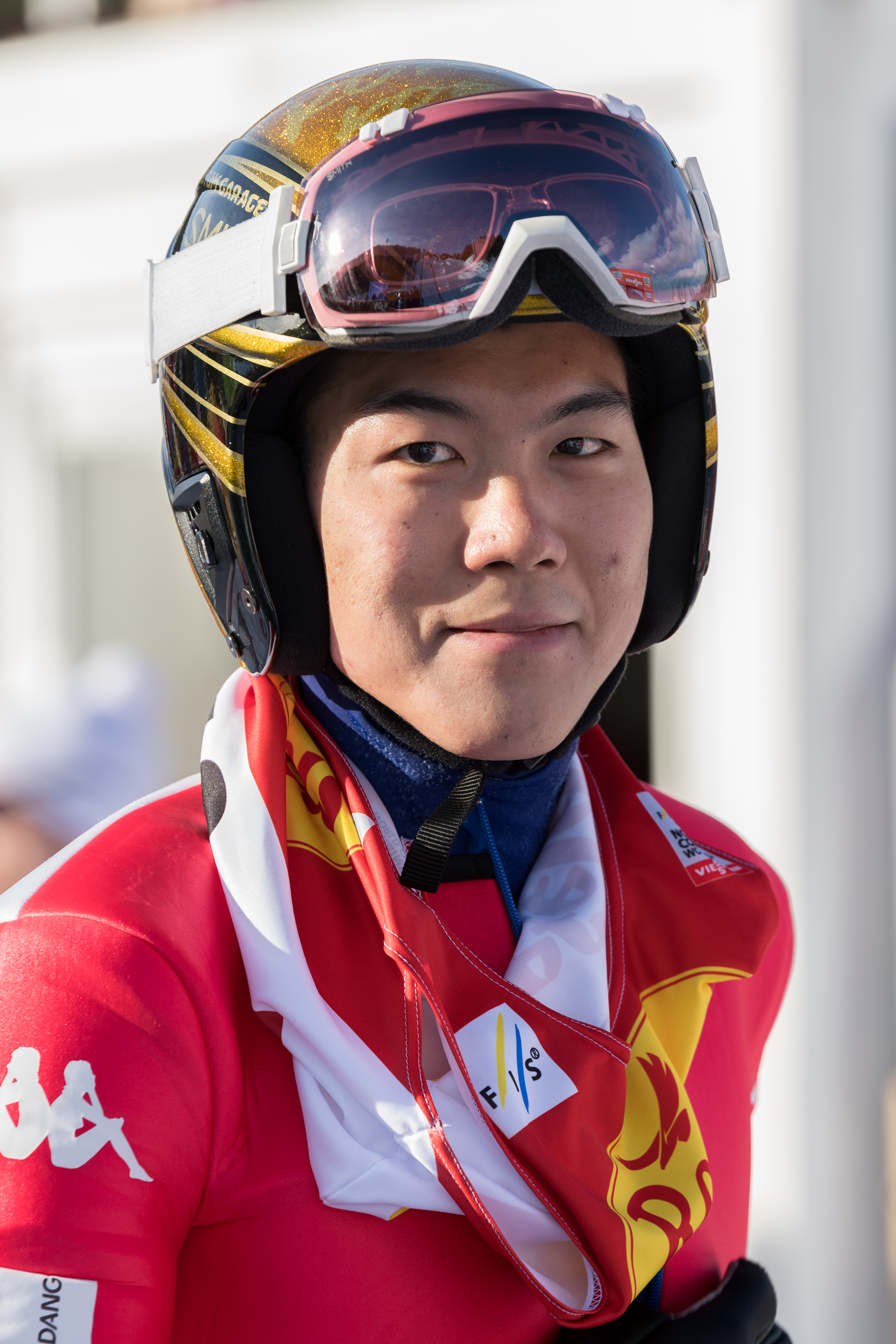
- Park Je-un in 2018

Personal information
- Native name: 박제언
- Born: 11 March 1993 (age 32)

Sport
- Country: South Korea
- Sport: Nordic combined skiing

Park Je-un (Korean: 박제언; born 11 March 1993) is a South Korean Nordic combined skier who competes internationally.

He competed at the 2018 Winter Olympics.

== Filmography ==
=== Television show ===
Year	Title	Network	Role	Notes	Ref.
2022–2023	The Gentlemen's League	JTBC/Netflix	Cast member	Season 2	
2023-2024	The Gentlemen's League	JTBC/Netflix	Cast member	Season 3	
