= Robert Fegg =

German luger (born 1978)

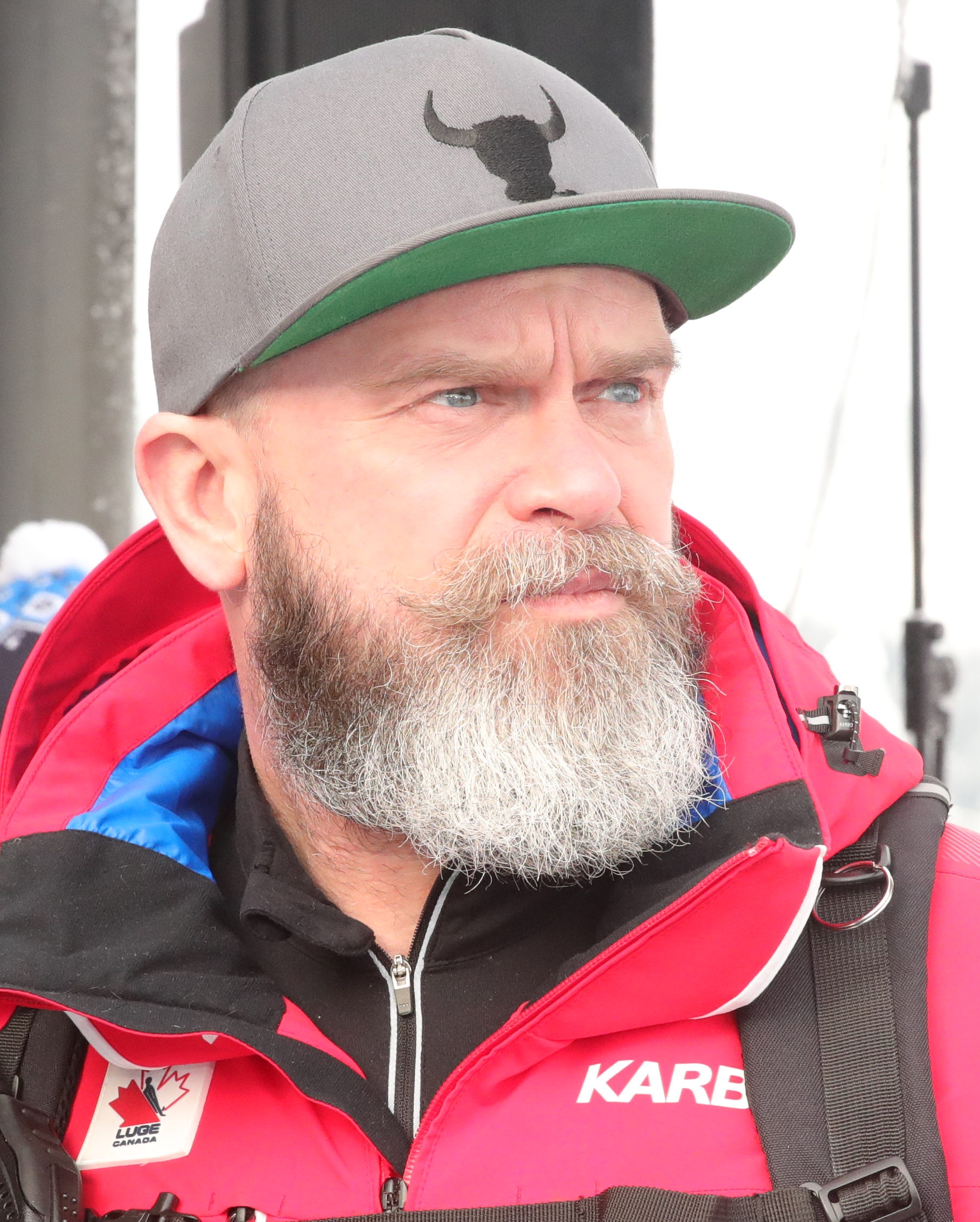
- Fegg in 2023

Medal record

Luge

Representing Germany

World Championships
Silver medal – second place	1999 Königssee	Mixed team

Robert Fegg (born 26 October 1978) is a German luger who competed from 1997 to 2001. He won a silver medal in the mixed team event at the 1999 FIL World Luge Championships in Königssee, Germany. In 1997, he won the gold medal at the Junior World Luge Championship in Oberhof (Germany) in singles and team event. In 1998, he won the gold medal at the Junior World Luge Championship in Sigulda (Latvia) in the team event and silver medal in singles event.

As of 2003 until 2014, Fegg was a coach on the Canadian national luge team. In 2014, Fegg coached the Korean luge team until 2018. In 2018, Fegg began coaching the United States junior luge team, and in 2020 was promoted to head coach of the United States senior luge team.
