= Yang Jun-beom =

South Korean actor (born 2005)

- Born: January 30, 2005 (age 20)
- Education: Dankook University
- Occupations: Actor; Model
- Years active: 2023–present
- Agent: MEGAMETA
- Height: 1.87 m (6 ft 2 in)
- Website: megametaent.com

Yang Jun-beom (Korean: 양준범; born January 30, 2005) is a South Korean actor and model. He is from the ASTEON project under MegaMeta Entertainment.

== Early life and education ==
Yang was a soccer player who played from 4th grade in elementary school to 1st grade in high school. He played for Suwon Samsung Bluewings U12 and Seongnam FC U15.

Yang studies in the Department of Performance and Film at Dankook University.

== Career ==
In 2023, Yang was introduced as a member of the ASTEON project.

In 2024, Yang made his first TV appearance on the JTBC football program The Gentlemen's League Season 3 and was selected as the team captain. He continued appearing in Season 4 in 2025.

In December 2025, Yang will make his acting debut in the web drama Will You Be My Manager?, which will premiere on Wavve and Rakuten Viki.

== Filmography ==
=== Web series ===
Year	Title	Role	Notes	Ref.
2025	Will You Be My Manager?	Kim Ba-reun		

=== Television shows ===
Year	Title	Role	Notes	Ref.
2024	The Gentlemen's League 3	Cast member		
2025	The Gentlemen's League 4	Cast member		
