= Feelin's =

Feelin's or Feelins or Feelins' or Feelin or variant, may refer to:

== Albums ==
- Feelin's (Sonny Stitt album) (Roost, 1962)
- Feelin's (Teddy Edwards album) (Muse, 1975)
- Feelins' (album), a 1975 album by Conway Twitty and Loretta Lynn

== Songs ==
- "Feelins'", a 1975 song by Conway Twitty and Loretta Lynn, the title track off the eponymous album Feelins'
- "Feelin's", a 1962 song by Sonny Stitt, the title track off the eponymous album Feelin's (Sonny Stitt album)
- "Feelins", a 1975 song by Betty Davis off the album Nasty Gal (album)
- "Feelins", a 2017 single by PnB Rock off the album Catch These Vibes; see PnB Rock discography
- "Feelin'", a 1991 song by The La's off their eponymous album The La's
- "Da Feelin'", a 2007 song by Dizzee Rascal off the album Maths + English

== See also ==
- "Feelin' the Feelin'" (song), 1986 song by The Bellamy Brothers
- Feelings (disambiguation)
- Feeling (disambiguation)
- Feelin' It (disambiguation)
- Feelin' You (disambiguation)
- Feelin' Myself (disambiguation)
- Feelin' Alright
