= Wave (WEi EP) =

- Digital cover

EP by WEi
- Released: February 14, 2024
- Length: 8:32
- Language: Japanese
- Label: Oui Entertainment; KISS Entertainment

WEi chronology
Love Pt. 3: Eternally (2023)	Wave (2024)	The Feelings (2025)

Singles from Wave
- 1. "Fake Love" Released: February 14, 2024

Wave is the second Japanese extended play by South Korean boy group WEi. It was released by Oui Entertainment on February 14, 2024, and contains three tracks, including the lead single "Fake Love".

== Background and release ==
On January 18, 2024, Oui Entertainment announced that WEi would release their second Japanese EP Wave on February 14. Member Yohan did not be participate in the album promotions due to schedule conflicts. On January 29, the track list was released, with "Fake Love" announced as the lead single. Music video teasers for the lead single were released on February 5 and February 12, respectively. On February 9, the highlight medley video was released.

== Composition ==
Wave consists of three tracks and is described as an album filled with various stories of love in which the members express their feelings of wounded, heartbreaking, unconditional, and sad love with their charming voices. The title track "Fake Love" uses WEi's distinctive vocals, a witty electric guitary sound, and straightforward lyrics that convey the pain of parting and regretting your past self who was deeply in love with a beloved lover. The second track "All Mine" is a love song about a romance that bloomed from an unforgettable adolescent crush. The third track "Without U" expresses an anxious heart towards love using an acoustic guitar and sweet vocals.

== Promotion ==
Following the release of Wave, WEi held events over 24 days which included live concerts, talk shows, fan meetings, and autograph sessions to commemorate their album release.

== Track listing ==
Wave track listing
No.	Title	Lyrics	Music	Arrangement	Length
1.	"Fake Love" (偽物)	CiELO (CIELOGROOVE); Moode (CIELOGROOVE)	CiELO (CIELOGROOVE); Moode (CIELOGROOVE)	CiELO (CIELOGROOVE)	2:30
2.	"All Mine"	KIMURA YUI	Mark Angelico Thomson; Joe Chen; Phil Schwan	Joe Chen; Phil Schwan	3:18
3.	"Without U" (怖いんだ)	Jang Dae-hyeon; RYVNG (Stupid Squad); OH Hyoungseok (Stupid Squad); Maynine (Stupid Squad); h.toyosaki	Jang Dae-hyeon; RYVNG (Stupid Squad); OH Hyoungseok (Stupid Squad); Maynine (Stupid Squad)	Jang Dae-hyeon; RYVNG (Stupid Squad); OH Hyoungseok (Stupid Squad); Maynine (Stupid Squad); h.toyosaki	2:31
Total length:					8:32

== Charts ==
=== Weekly charts ===
Weekly chart performance for Wave
Chart (2024)	Peak position
Japanese Albums (Oricon)	20
Japanese Combined Albums (Oricon)	33
Japanese Hot Albums (Billboard Japan)	13

=== Monthly charts ===
Monthly chart performance for Wave
Chart (2024)	Position
Japanese Albums (Oricon)	49

== Release history ==
Region	Date	Format	Label
Various	February 14, 2024	CD	Oui Entertainment; KISS Entertainment
Various	February 14, 2024	Digital download; streaming	Oui Entertainment; KISS Entertainment
