= Identity: First Sight =

- Digital cover

EP by WEi
- Released: October 5, 2020
- Recorded: 2020
- Length: 17:08
- Language: Korean
- Labels: Oui Entertainment; Kakao M

WEi chronology
Identity: First Sight (2020)	Identity: Challenge (2021)

Singles from Identity: First Sight
- 1. "Twilight" Released: October 5, 2020

Identity: First Sight is the debut extended play by South Korean boy group WEi. It was released by Oui Entertainment on October 5, 2020 and contains five tracks, including the lead single "Twilight".

== Background and release ==
On June 17, 2020, Oui Entertainment announced it would be debuting a new boy group. On September 11, it was announced the group would release their debut extended play Identity: First Sight on October 5. On September 25, the track list was released, with "Twilight" announced as the lead single. Four days later, the highlight medley video was released. Music video teasers for the lead single were released on September 28 and October 4, respectively.

== Composition ==
Identity: First Sight consists of five tracks that incorporates various genres. The lead single "Twilight" is a pop music song with an alternative R&B element. The second track "Doremifa" is an upbeat love song of the futurepop genre based on a New jack swing rhythm. The third track "Timeless" is described as a warm and sentimental fan song. The fourth track "Hug You" is a future dance song that features the harmonious vocals of the members. The fifth track "Fuze" is a EDM genre song produced by member Jang Dae-hyeon.

== Promotion ==
Following the release of Identity: First Sight, WEi held an online showcase on the same date to introduce the extended play and communicate with their fans. The group performed "Twilight" and "Fuze" during the showcase. The group's promotions for the song "Twilight" began on October 8, 2020, on Mnet's M Countdown. The B-side track "Fuze" was also performed during the group's first week of promotions. "Timeless" was performed on MBC M's Show Champion on October 21 and "Doremifa" was performed on January 12, 2021 to celebrate the group's 100 day anniversary since debut.

== Track listing ==
Identity: First Sight track listing
No.	Title	Lyrics	Music	Arrangement	Length
1.	"Twilight"	Hui; Flow Blow; Jang Dae-hyeon	Flow Blow; Hui	Flow Blow	3:20
2.	"Doremifa"	Cho Yuri (Jam Factory); Jang Dae-hyeon; Kim Yo-han	Young Chance; PUFF; Kwon Deok Geun	PUFF; Kwon Deok Geun	3:24
3.	"Timeless"	OUOW; Jang Dae-hyeon; Yoo Yong-ha	OUOW	OUOW	3:35
4.	"Hug You"	VENDORS; Jang Dae-hyeon; Kim Dong-han; Kim Jun-seo	VENDORS	VENDORS	3:31
5.	"Fuze" (도화선 Prod. by Jang Dae-hyeon)	Jang Dae-hyeon; RYVNG (Stupid Squad); Maynine (Stupid Squad); Kang Seok-hwa	Jang Dae-hyeon; RYVNG (Stupid Squad); Maynine (Stupid Squad)	Jang Dae-hyeon; RYVNG (Stupid Squad); Maynine (Stupid Squad)	3:15
Total length:					17:08

== Charts ==
=== Weekly charts ===
Weekly chart performance for Identity: First Sight
Chart (2022)	Peak position
South Korean Albums (Gaon)	3

=== Monthly charts ===
Monthly chart performance for Identity: First Sight
Chart (2022)	Peak position
South Korean Albums (Gaon)	15

== Release history ==
Region	Date	Format	Label
Various	October 5, 2020	CD	Oui Entertainment; Kakao M
Various	October 5, 2020	Digital download; streaming	Oui Entertainment; Kakao M
