= Identity: Action =

- Digital cover

EP by WEi
- Released: June 9, 2021
- Recorded: 2021
- Length: 16:43
- Language: Korean
- Labels: Oui Entertainment; Kakao Entertainment

WEi chronology
Identity: Challenge (2021)	Identity: Action (2021)	Love Pt. 1: First Love (2022)

Singles from Identity: Action
- 1. "Bye Bye Bye" Released: June 9, 2021

Identity: Action is the third extended play by South Korean boy group WEi. It was released by Oui Entertainment on June 9, 2021 and contains five tracks, including the lead single "Bye Bye Bye".

== Background and release ==
On May 24, 2021, it was announced the group would release their third extended play Identity: Action on June 9. On June 2, the track list was released, with "Bye Bye Bye" announced as the lead single. The next day, the highlight medley video was released. Music video teasers for the lead single were released on June 5 and June 8, respectively.

== Composition ==
Identity: Action consists of five tracks and is described as being a bright and refreshing summer album that illuminates the group's growth while also being the last album in the group's Identity trilogy. The lead single "Bye Bye Bye" is a described as refreshing with a cool beat and addictive hook melody which expresses the desire to find your true self by doing what you want to do and escaping from worries and restraints. The second track "White Light" is a modern pop music song that expresses the desire to give everything to the person they love like a white hole in space. The third track "Waitin'" is described as sweet and captivating trendy hip-hop song with trap music rhythm about seducing the one you love while telling them to run away because you're dangerous. The fourth track "Ocean" is described as fast-paced and refreshing atmosphere that uses expressions to compare someone to the sea. The fifth track "RUi" is ballad composed by member Jang Dae-hyeon and described as containing the group's feelings for their fans with the meaning of the fans will be the ones who open the way for the group.

== Promotion ==
Following the release of Identity: Action, WEi held an online showcase on the same date to introduce the extended play and communicate with their fans. The group performed "Bye Bye Bye", "Waitin'", and "RUi" during the showcase. The group's promotions for the song "Bye Bye Bye" began on June 10, 2021, on Mnet's M Countdown. The B-side track "Waitin'" was also performed during the group's promotions. A special music video featuring "Ocean" was released on July 31 to celebrate the group's 300 day anniversary since debut.

== Track listing ==
Identity: Action track listing
No.	Title	Lyrics	Music	Arrangement	Length
1.	"Bye Bye Bye" (모 아님 도 Prod. Jang Daehyeon)	MosPick; Jang Dae-hyeon; Yoo Yong-ha; Kim Yo-han	MosPick	MosPick	3:25
2.	"White Light"	Cho Yuri; Jomalxne	Moon Hanmiru (220VOLT); Jomalxne; Saimon; Brian Cho	Brian Cho; Saimon	3:25
3.	"Waitin'"	$UN; Lee Yumi; rudbeckia	STAINBOYS; $UN; Park Jae Hyung	STAINBOYS	3:06
4.	"Ocean"	MosPick; Jang Dae-heyon; Yoo Yong-ha; Kim Yo-han	MosPick	MosPick	3:31
5.	"RUi" (16번째 별)	Jang Dae-hyeon; Kang Seok-hwa; RYVNG (Stupid Squad); Maynine (Stupid Squad)	Jang Dae-hyeon; Stupid Squad (RYVNG, Oh Hyung Seok, Maynine)	Jang Dae-hyeon; Stupid Squad (RYVNG, Oh Hyung Seok, Maynine)	3:16
Total length:					16:43

== Charts ==
=== Weekly charts ===
Weekly chart performance for Identity: Action
Chart (2022)	Peak position
South Korean Albums (Gaon)	3
Japan Albums (Oricon)	20

=== Monthly charts ===
Monthly chart performance for Identity: Action
Chart (2022)	Peak position
South Korean Albums (Gaon)	13

== Release history ==
Region	Date	Format	Label
Various	June 9, 2021	CD	Oui Entertainment; Kakao Entertainment
Various	June 9, 2021	Digital download; streaming	Oui Entertainment; Kakao Entertainment
