= Youth (WEi EP) =

- Digital cover

EP by WEi
- Released: August 11, 2022
- Recorded: 2022
- Length: 9:55
- Language: Japanese
- Label: Oui Entertainment; Imx Inc

WEi chronology
Love Pt. 1: First Love (2022)	Youth (2022)	Love Pt. 2: Passion (2022)

Singles from Youth
- 1. "Maldives" Released: August 11, 2022

Youth is the first Japanese extended play by South Korean boy group WEi. It was released by Oui Entertainment on August 11, 2022, and contains three tracks, including the lead single "Maldives". This EP also includes Japanese versions of "Bye Bye Bye" and "RUi".

== Background and release ==
On July 4, 2022, Oui Entertainment announced that WEi would be making their Japanese debut with their first Japanese EP Youth to be released on August 11. On July 28, the track list was released, with "Maldives" announced as the lead single. Music video teasers for the lead single were released on August 1, August 5, August 6, and August 8, respectively. Prior to the album's official release, the music video for the lead single was released on August 10.

== Composition ==
Youth consists of three tracks and is described as an album filled with WEi's unique colors that capture the image of the word youth. It presents listeners with a dynamic everyday life by depicting the innocence that can only be felt and held in youth. The title track "Maldives" is a disco house genre song that depicts a brilliant moment of dreaming in an ideal place like the Maldives. The second track "Bye Bye Bye" is the Japanese version of the group's third single and depicts the courage and ambition of escaping from anxiety and restraints to set out in search of what you really want to do. The third track "RUi" is the Japanese version of the group's song by the same name and is a fan song expressing gratitude to the group's fans, RUi.

== Promotion ==
Following the release of Youth, WEi held a four-day event which included live concerts, talk shows, and autograph sessions to commemorate their Japan debut.

== Track listing ==
Identity: First Sight track listing
No.	Title	Lyrics	Music	Arrangement	Length
1.	"Maldives"	Sooyoon; Moon Kim	Moon Kim; Sooyoon; Stainboys	Stainboys	3:12
2.	"Bye Bye Bye" (Japanese version)	MosPick; Jang Dae-hyeon; Yoo Yong-ha; Kim Yo-han	MosPick	MosPick	3:28
3.	"Rui" (16番目の星; Japanese version)	Jang Dae-hyeon; Kang Seok-hwa; RYVNG (Stupid Squad); Maynine (Stupid Squad); Miki Taoka	Jang Dae-hyeon; Stupid Squad	Jang Dae-hyeon; Stupid Squad	3:15
Total length:					9:55

== Charts ==
=== Weekly charts ===
Weekly chart performance for Youth
Chart (2022)	Peak position
Japanese Albums (Oricon)	3
Japanese Combined Albums (Oricon)	3
Japanese Hot Albums (Billboard Japan)	44

=== Monthly charts ===
Monthly chart performance for Youth
Chart (2022)	Peak position
Japanese Albums (Oricon)	14

== Release history ==
Region	Date	Format	Label
Various	August 11, 2022	CD	Oui Entertainment; Imx Inc
Various	August 11, 2022	Digital download; streaming	Oui Entertainment; Imx Inc
