= List of Produce 101 season 2 contestants =

Produce 101 season 2 was a 2017 South Korean reality television show.

== Contestants ==
The spelling of name in English are according to the official website. The Korean contestants are presented in Eastern order (family name, given name). The age listed is according to the Korean age system at the start of the competition.

Color key

Left the show
Eliminated in Episode 5
Eliminated in Episode 8
Eliminated in Episode 10
Eliminated in Episode 11
Final members of Wanna One

Company	Name	Age	Judges evaluation		Ranking												
Company	Name	Age	Judges evaluation		Ep.1	Ep.2	Ep.3	Episode 5		Ep.6	Episode 8		Episode 10		Episode 11		Final
Company	Name	Age	1	2	#	#	#	#	Votes	#	#	Votes	#	Votes	#	Votes	Final
Individual Trainee (개인 연습생)	Kim Sang-bin (김상빈)	23	B	A	46	51	55	60	100,142	39	48	379,753	Eliminated				48
Individual Trainee (개인 연습생)	Kim Jae-hwan (김재환)^{1}	22	B	B	27	18	18	16	569,969	7	9	1,822,842	13	255,776	4	1,051,735	4
Individual Trainee (개인 연습생)	Kim Chan (김찬)	22	D	F	39	40	56	82	69,967	Eliminated							82
Individual Trainee (개인 연습생)	Lee In-soo (이인수)^{2}	22	C	B	33	30	43	57	105,599	56	57	256,851	Eliminated				57
Individual Trainee (개인 연습생)	Choi Dong-ha (최동하)	22	C	B	38	35	51	63	88,032	Eliminated							63
2able Company (투에이블 컴퍼니)	Ju Won-tak (주원탁)^{3}	22	B	C	92	83	94	62	88,474	Eliminated							62
2Y Entertainment	Lee Ki-won (이기원)	22	D	D	63	65	58	58	103,065	46	53	318,579	Eliminated				53
Ardor and Able (아더앤에이블)	Roh Tae-hyun (노태현)^{4}	25	A	A	61	48	24	26	353,043	32	21	945,314	25	143,523	Eliminated		25
Ardor and Able (아더앤에이블)	Ha Sung-woon (하성운)^{4}	24	A	A	34	28	23	21	459,912	27	25	838,649	3	413,654	11	790,302	11
Banana Entertainment (바나나)	Yoon Yong-bin (윤용빈)^{5}	23	C	D	80	73	67	73	77,030	Eliminated							73
Blessing Entertainment (블레싱)	Yu Jin-won (유진원)	21	C	F	79	87	70	75	76,303	Eliminated							75
Blessing Entertainment (블레싱)	Im Woo-hyeok (임우혁)	24	C	C	49	53	57	66	86,710	Eliminated							66
Brand New Music (브랜뉴뮤직)	Kim Dong-hyun (김동현)	20	B	B	42	46	35	39	163,092	41	29	821,551	28	125,155	Eliminated		28
Brand New Music (브랜뉴뮤직)	Park Woo-jin (박우진)	19	A	A	72	75	38	24	403,690	16	14	1,386,889	6	372,493	6	937,379	6
Brand New Music (브랜뉴뮤직)	Lee Dae-hwi (이대휘)	17	A	A	3	3	2	7	809,484	10	4	2,095,314	10	325,990	3	1,102,005	3
Brand New Music (브랜뉴뮤직)	Lim Young-min (임영민)	23	B	A	24	27	31	27	312,983	12	5	2,011,798	17	197,721	15	654,505	15
Brave Entertainment (브레이브 엔터테인먼트)	Kim Samuel (김사무엘)^{6}	16	A	A	6	2	3	2	863,861	17	16	1,306,508	5	378,491	18	391,529	18
C2K Entertainment	Kim Seong-lee (김성리)^{7}	24	B	A	69	60	53	46	133,494	51	47	395,013	Eliminated				47
C9 Entertainment	Bae Jin-young (배진영)	18	C	F	5	12	10	12	667,298	14	12	1,502,905	4	389,982	10	807,749	10
Choon Entertainment (춘)	Kim Shi-hyun (김시현) ^{31}	20	D	D	Left the Show												
Choon Entertainment (춘)	Jin Longguo (김용국) / (金龍國)	22	C	D	44	49	37	34	195,419	35	18	1,190,935	21	184,303	Eliminated		21
Cre.Ker Entertainment (크래커)	Joo Haknyeon (주학년)	19	F	F	4	8	6	10	700,391	9	10	1,619,176	18	197,194	19	349,040	19
CS Entertainment	Cho Jin-hyung (조진형)^{8}	22	D	B	85	92	75	72	77,924	Eliminated							72
Cube Entertainment	Lai Guanlin (라이관린) / (賴冠霖)	17	D	F	10	6	7	9	717,275	5	2	2,202,665	20	188,940	7	905,875	7
Cube Entertainment	Yoo Seon-ho (유선호)	16	F	F	22	16	15	15	575,027	11	13	1,502,513	16	209,168	17	551,745	17
FENT (에프이엔티)	Lee Jun-woo (이준우)	20	F	C	30	36	33	41	157,041	58	50	343,252	Eliminated				50
Fantagio (판타지오)	Ong Seong-wu (옹성우)	23	A	A	8	4	4	4	819,186	6	7	1,998,849	8	358,656	5	984,756	5
FNC Entertainment	Yoo Hoe-seung (유회승)	23	D	C	43	39	49	56	109,060	36	39	527,138	Eliminated				39
Gini Stars Entertainment (지니스타즈)	Kim Do-hyun (김도현)^{9}	26	C	C	86	69	86	92	64,157	Eliminated							92
Gini Stars Entertainment (지니스타즈)	Park Hee-seok (박희석)^{9}	26	D	C	89	66	87	86	68,008	Eliminated							86
Gini Stars Entertainment (지니스타즈)	Wang Min-hyeok (왕민혁)^{10}	24	D	D	98	85	98	89	66,475	Eliminated							89
GNI Entertainment (지엔아이)	Jeong Si-hyun (정시현)	27	F	F	48	56	62	77	74,829	Eliminated							77
GON Entertainment	Hong Eun-ki (홍은기)	21	C	D	29	31	41	36	176,813	38	38	557,008	Eliminated				38
Hanahreum Company (한아름 컴퍼니)	Kim Tae-min (김태민)^{11}	23	F	F	26	33	30	32	260,391	37	Left the Show						59
HF Music Company (HF뮤직컴퍼니)	Park Woo-dam (박우담)	23	C	D	59	57	68	55	112,521	21	28	826,392	35	31,975	Eliminated		35
HF Music Company (HF뮤직컴퍼니)	Woo Jin-young (우진영)	21	C	A	55	50	45	42	153,419	40	40	522,149	Eliminated				40
HF Music Company (HF뮤직컴퍼니)	Jeong Won-cheol (정원철)^{2}	22	F	B	81	72	85	95	57,775	Eliminated							95
HF Music Company (HF뮤직컴퍼니)	Jo Yong-geun (조용근)	23	F	C	65	59	71	93	61,660	Eliminated							93
HIM Entertainment	Park Sung-woo (박성우)	30	F	F	12	13	17	22	452,876	31	37	562,716	Eliminated				37
Hunus Entertainment (후너스)	Kim Sang-gyun (김상균)^{12}	23	F	D	47	38	47	43	152,329	23	27	830,779	26	140,890	Eliminated		26
I.One Entertainment (아이원)	Kim Yeon-kuk (김연국)	23	F	D	97	91	92	76	75,768	Eliminated							76
I.One Entertainment (아이원)	Nam Yoon-sung (남윤성)^{31}	22	F	C	Left the Show												
I.One Entertainment (아이원)	Ryu Ho-yeon (유호연)	20	F	C	96	95	93	87	67,707	Eliminated							87
I.One Entertainment (아이원)	Choi Hee-soo (최희수)	21	F	F	68	79	79	96	55,959	Eliminated							96
IMX	Cho Gyu-min (조규민)	25	F	D	94	89	97	88	67,359	Eliminated							88
IT Entertainment	Lee Seo-kyu (이서규)^{13}	20	F	D	91	43	50	69	80,052	Eliminated							69
IT Entertainment	Han Min-ho (한민호)^{13}	21	D	C	84	96	82	74	77,000	Eliminated							74
Jellyfish Entertainment (젤리피쉬)	Yun Hee-seok (윤희석)	21	F	B	25	26	32	30	264,133	45	46	408,503	Eliminated				46
K-Tigers (K타이거즈)	Byun Hyun-min (변현민)	19	F	C	52	70	73	52	116,449	44	45	419,381	Eliminated				45
Kiwi Media Group (키위 미디어 그룹)	Kim Dong-bin (김동빈)	17	F	F	40	37	25	33	237,033	59	58	256,770	Eliminated				58
Maroo Entertainment (마루기획)	Kwon Hyeop (권협)	20	D	C	41	41	52	65	86,745	Eliminated							65
Maroo Entertainment (마루기획)	Park Ji-hoon (박지훈)	19	C	B	1	1	1	1	1,044,197	3	3	2,181,840	2	630,198	2	1,136,014	2
Maroo Entertainment (마루기획)	Han Jong-youn (한종연)^{14}	20	B	A	Left the Show												
Media Line (미디어라인)	Lee Woo-jin (이우진)^{15}	15	B	A	20	22	21	18	511,463	22	26	836,127	34	47,796	Eliminated		34
MMO Entertainment	Kang Daniel (강다니엘)	22	B	A	23	23	12	5	817,245	2	8	1,978,847	1	828,148	1	1,578,837	1
MMO Entertainment	Kim Jae-han (김재한)^{16}	23	C	C	83	64	72	81	71,281	Eliminated							81
MMO Entertainment	Yoon Ji-sung (윤지성)	27	F	D	35	19	9	3	844,829	13	15	1,372,652	9	333,974	8	902,098	8
MMO Entertainment	Joo Jin-woo (주진우)	25	F	F	77	80	77	45	141,432	42	41	496,934	Eliminated				41
MMO Entertainment	Choi Tae-woong (최태웅)	24	C	D	76	71	65	71	78,323	Eliminated							71
Namoo Actors (나무엑터스)	Lee Yoo-jin (이유진)^{17}	26	D	C	58	42	48	48	130,509	50	54	316,255	Eliminated				54
Narda Entertainment (나르다)	Kim Tae-woo (김태우)^{18}	25	F	D	28	34	44	38	167,726	49	49	367,727	Eliminated				49
ONO Entertainment (오앤오)	Jang Moon-bok (장문복)^{19}	23	F	F	2	5	8	14	597,046	26	32	745,093	27	130,324	Eliminated		27
Oui Entertainment (위)	Kim Dong-han (김동한)	20	D	B	57	78	78	37	175,107	34	35	629,883	29	120,594	Eliminated		29
Oui Entertainment (위)	Jang Daehyeon (장대현)	21	B	D	51	54	66	83	69,146	Eliminated							83
Oui Entertainment (위)	Jo Sung-wook (조성욱)	22	F	F	87	97	90	91	64,374	Eliminated							91
Pan Entertainment (팬)	Lee Ji-han (이지한)	20	F	B	90	74	88	98	51,123	Eliminated							98
Pledis Entertainment (플레디스)	Kang Dong-ho (강동호)^{20}	23	D	D	19	14	20	20	472,132	8	11	1,585,712	12	314,807	13	755,436	13 (Note: Kang Dong-ho was revealed to have been rigged out of Wanna One. His original rank is unknown.)
Pledis Entertainment (플레디스)	Kim Jong-hyun (김종현)^{20}	23	D	B	15	11	13	8	752,149	1	1	2,795,491	7	367,052	14	704,148	14
Pledis Entertainment (플레디스)	Choi Min-ki (최민기)^{20}	23	D	F	14	15	19	19	476,249	18	20	1,102,561	15	217,734	20	297,106	20
Pledis Entertainment (플레디스)	Hwang Min-hyun (황민현)^{20}	23	C	D	11	9	16	11	680,322	4	6	2,004,207	11	315,650	9	862,719	9
Rainbow Bridge World (RBW)	Son Dong-myeong (손동명)^{21}	19	D	F	53	61	69	68	84,469	Eliminated							68
Rainbow Bridge World (RBW)	Yeo Hwan-woong (여환웅)	20	B	B	32	32	39	49	126,568	54	42	472,798	Eliminated				42
Rainbow Bridge World (RBW)	Lee Gun-min (이건민)	22	D	F	56	81	83	94	60,404	Eliminated							94
Rainbow Bridge World (RBW)	Lee Keon-hee (이건희)	20	D	D	17	24	27	29	269,787	29	30	799,975	33	50,148	Eliminated		33
Rainbow Bridge World (RBW)	Choi Jae-woo (최재우)	21	C	B	74	94	80	97	52,711	Eliminated							97
S How Entertainment (에스하우)	Kim Nam-hyung (김남형)^{22}	25	A	A	75	58	46	54	112,841	47	52	328,569	Eliminated				52
S How Entertainment (에스하우)	Jeong Dong-su (정동수)^{22}	27	B	C	60	52	36	35	180,209	30	36	587,830	Eliminated				36
Star Road Entertainment (스타로드)	Kenta Takada (타카다 켄타) / (高田健太)	23	C	B	21	25	29	28	287,263	24	31	783,860	24	146,716	Eliminated		24
Starship Entertainment (스타쉽)	Lee Gwang-hyun (이광현)^{23}	20	B	C	45	47	40	44	145,251	43	44	442,392	Eliminated				44
Starship Entertainment (스타쉽)	Jung Se-woon (정세운)^{24}	21	B	B	13	17	11	13	634,134	15	17	1,284,267	19	196,223	12	769,859	12
STL Entertainment (에스티엘)	Choi Jun-young (최준영)^{25}	22	B	C	82	98	81	90	66,443	Eliminated							90
The Jackie Chan Group Korea (더잭키찬그룹코리아)	Kim Chan-yul (김찬율)^{26}	26	F	F	93	90	96	78	73,320	Eliminated							78
The Jackie Chan Group Korea (더잭키찬그룹코리아)	Choi Ha-don (최하돈)^{26}	25	D	F	73	86	91	85	68,009	Eliminated							85
The Vibe Label (더바이브레이블)	Kim Tae-dong (김태동)^{27}	21	F	A	37	45	28	25	359,771	28	22	877,168	30	110,091	Eliminated		30
The Vibe Label (더바이브레이블)	Seong Hyun-woo (성현우)	22	C	B	54	67	84	61	99,983	Eliminated							61
The Vibe Label (더바이브레이블)	Yoon Jae-chan (윤재찬)	19	B	C	67	55	60	59	101,243	52	55	277,022	Eliminated				55
The Vibe Label (더바이브레이블)	Ha Minho (하민호)^{28}	20	B	C	50	63	63	47	132,056	Left the Show							60
Total Set (토탈셋)	Yoo Kyoung-mok (유경목)^{29}	24	D	C	78	62	74	84	68,265	Eliminated							84
Wayz Company (웨이즈 컴퍼니)	Jeong Joong-ji (정중지)	26	F	F	64	77	59	64	86,864	Eliminated							64
WH Creative	Seo Sung-hyuk (서성혁)	19	D	D	95	88	95	51	120,808	19	24	844,163	31	54,415	Eliminated		31
Widmay (위드메이)	Kim Ye-hyeon (김예현)	19	F	C	71	93	34	40	159,576	55	33	691,611	32	53,277	Eliminated		32
Wings Entertainment (윙즈)	Kim Yong-jin (김용진)^{3}	21	D	F	88	84	61	53	114,426	53	56	261,354	Eliminated				56
YGKPlus (YG케이플러스)	Kwon Hyun-bin (권현빈)	21	F	F	16	20	22	23	408,701	33	34	645,510	22	160,693	Eliminated		22
YGKPlus (YG케이플러스)	Kim Hyeon-woo (김현우)	20	F	C	66	82	89	70	79,305	Eliminated							70
YGKPlus (YG케이플러스)	Lee Hoo-lim (이후림)	26	D	B	62	68	76	80	72,260	Eliminated							80
YGKPlus (YG케이플러스)	Jeong Hyo-jun (정효준)	26	F	F	36	44	54	67	85,218	Eliminated							67
Yuehua Entertainment (위에화)	Ahn Hyeong-seop (안형섭)	19	D	A	7	7	5	6	810,639	20	19	1,171,439	14	254,984	16	609,085	16
Yuehua Entertainment (위에화)	Lee Eui-woong (이의웅)^{30}	17	C	D	9	10	14	17	520,973	25	23	855,494	23	156,572	Eliminated		23
Yuehua Entertainment (위에화)	Justin (저스틴) / (黄明昊)	14	C	D	18	21	26	31	261,653	48	43	458,650	Eliminated				43
Yuehua Entertainment (위에화)	Zhu Zhengting (정정) / (朱正廷)	20	C	D	31	29	42	50	122,552	57	51	330,058	Eliminated				51
Yuehua Entertainment (위에화)	Choi Seung-hyeok (최승혁)	19	D	D	70	76	64	79	72,983	Eliminated							79

== Group Battle Performances (Episodes 3–4) ==
Color key

- Winner
- Leader
- Center
- Leader and center

Performance			Team		Contestant				
#	Artist	Song	#	Votes	Position	Name	Votes	Votes with bonus	Rank
1	2PM	"10 out of 10"	1	357 (avg:59.5)	Main vocal	Yoon Jae-chan	51	51	69
1	2PM	"10 out of 10"	1	357 (avg:59.5)	Sub vocal 1	Lee Hoolim	25	25	85
1	2PM	"10 out of 10"	1	357 (avg:59.5)	Sub vocal 2	Kim Hyeon-woo	58	58	67
1	2PM	"10 out of 10"	1	357 (avg:59.5)	Sub vocal 3	Yoon Jisung	66	66	65
1	2PM	"10 out of 10"	1	357 (avg:59.5)	Rapper 1	Kim Taewoo	85	85	59
1	2PM	"10 out of 10"	1	357 (avg:59.5)	Rapper 2	**Kim Taemin**	72	72	63
1	2PM	"10 out of 10"	2	401 (avg:57.3)	Main vocal	Roh Taehyun	27	3027	42
1	2PM	"10 out of 10"	2	401 (avg:57.3)	Sub vocal 1	Yoon Yongbin	18	3018	46
1	2PM	"10 out of 10"	2	401 (avg:57.3)	Sub vocal 2	Hong Eunki	34	3034	36
1	2PM	"10 out of 10"	2	401 (avg:57.3)	Sub vocal 3	Byun Hyunmin	100	3100	15
1	2PM	"10 out of 10"	2	401 (avg:57.3)	Sub vocal 4	Ahn Hyeongseop	163	3163	3
1	2PM	"10 out of 10"	2	401 (avg:57.3)	Rapper 1	Park Woojin	31	3031	40
1	2PM	"10 out of 10"	2	401 (avg:57.3)	Rapper 2	**Choi Junyoung**	28	3028	41
2	EXO	"Call Me Baby"	1	380	Main vocal	Kim Sungri	24	3024	43
2	EXO	"Call Me Baby"	1	380	Sub vocal 1	Yun Heeseok	121	3121	8
2	EXO	"Call Me Baby"	1	380	Sub vocal 2	**Jeong Woncheol**	15	3015	48
2	EXO	"Call Me Baby"	1	380	Sub vocal 3	Kim Donghan	76	3076	21
2	EXO	"Call Me Baby"	1	380	Rapper 1	Jang Moonbok	123	3123	7
2	EXO	"Call Me Baby"	1	380	Rapper 2	Seong Hyunwoo	21	3021	44
2	EXO	"Call Me Baby"	2	353	Main vocal	Joo Jinwoo	70	70	64
2	EXO	"Call Me Baby"	2	353	Sub vocal 1	Lee Seokyu	31	31	77
2	EXO	"Call Me Baby"	2	353	Sub vocal 2	**Jeong Sihyun**	31	31	77
2	EXO	"Call Me Baby"	2	353	Sub vocal 3	Kim Dongbin	79	79	61
2	EXO	"Call Me Baby"	2	353	Rapper 1	Jang Daehyeon	100	100	54
2	EXO	"Call Me Baby"	2	353	Rapper 2	Han Minho	42	42	72
3	Shinee	"Replay"	1	467	Main vocal	Lee Keonhee	94	3094	17
3	Shinee	"Replay"	1	467	Sub vocal 1	Choi Min-ki	157	3157	4
3	Shinee	"Replay"	1	467	Sub vocal 2	Lee Gwanghyun	39	3039	34
3	Shinee	"Replay"	1	467	Sub vocal 3	Yeo Hwanwoong	52	3052	29
3	Shinee	"Replay"	1	467	Sub vocal 4	**Zhu Zhengting**	19	3019	45
3	Shinee	"Replay"	1	467	Sub vocal 5	Justin	106	3106	12
3	Shinee	"Replay"	2	391	Main vocal	**Kim Jaehan**	37	37	75
3	Shinee	"Replay"	2	391	Sub vocal 1	Yu Jinwon	123	123	51
3	Shinee	"Replay"	2	391	Sub vocal 2	Kim Sangkyun	109	109	52
3	Shinee	"Replay"	2	391	Sub vocal 3	Choi Taewoong	24	24	86
3	Shinee	"Replay"	2	391	Sub vocal 4	Ryu Hoyeon	16	16	90
3	Shinee	"Replay"	2	391	Sub vocal 5	Lee Junwoo	82	82	60
4	SEVENTEEN	"Mansae"	1*	624 (avg:124.8)	Main vocal	Park Woodam	270	3270	1
4	SEVENTEEN	"Mansae"	1*	624 (avg:124.8)	Sub vocal 1	Ju Wontak	103	3103	14
4	SEVENTEEN	"Mansae"	1*	624 (avg:124.8)	Sub vocal 3	**Kim Yeonkuk**	7	3007	48
4	SEVENTEEN	"Mansae"	1*	624 (avg:124.8)	Rapper 1	Woo Jinyoung	64	3064	27
4	SEVENTEEN	"Mansae"	1*	624 (avg:124.8)	Rapper 2	Kim Taedong	180	3180	2
4	SEVENTEEN	"Mansae"	2	151 (avg:25.2)	Main vocal	Kim Yongjin	22	22	88
4	SEVENTEEN	"Mansae"	2	151 (avg:25.2)	Sub vocal 1	Kim Chanyul	7	7	95
4	SEVENTEEN	"Mansae"	2	151 (avg:25.2)	Sub vocal 2	Jo Sungwook	51	51	69
4	SEVENTEEN	"Mansae"	2	151 (avg:25.2)	Sub vocal 3	Jeong Joongji	13	13	93
4	SEVENTEEN	"Mansae"	2	151 (avg:25.2)	Rapper 1	Choi HaDon	51	51	69
4	SEVENTEEN	"Mansae"	2	151 (avg:25.2)	Rapper 2	Cho Gyumin	7	7	95
5	Super Junior	"Sorry Sorry"	1	208	Main vocal	Choi Dongha	40	40	73
5	Super Junior	"Sorry Sorry"	1	208	Sub vocal 1	Kwon Hyeop	27	27	83
5	Super Junior	"Sorry Sorry"	1	208	Sub vocal 2	Yu Seonho	93	93	57
5	Super Junior	"Sorry Sorry"	1	208	Sub vocal 3	**Jo Yonggeun**	7	7	95
5	Super Junior	"Sorry Sorry"	1	208	Sub vocal 4	Kim Namhyung	10	10	94
5	Super Junior	"Sorry Sorry"	1	208	Sub vocal 5	Ha Minho	31	31	77
5	Super Junior	"Sorry Sorry"	2	522	Main vocal	Kim Jaehwan	75	3075	23
5	Super Junior	"Sorry Sorry"	2	522	Sub vocal 1	**Hwang Minhyun**	108	3108	11
5	Super Junior	"Sorry Sorry"	2	522	Sub vocal 2	Kang Daniel	33	3033	38
5	Super Junior	"Sorry Sorry"	2	522	Sub vocal 3	Kwon Hyunbin	142	3142	5
5	Super Junior	"Sorry Sorry"	2	522	Sub vocal 4	Ong Seongwu	97	3097	16
5	Super Junior	"Sorry Sorry"	2	522	Sub vocal 5	Kim Jonghyun	67	3067	25
6	Beast	"Shock"	1	280	Main vocal	Wang Minhyeok	15	15	91
6	Beast	"Shock"	1	280	Sub vocal 1	Seo Sunghyuk	23	23	87
6	Beast	"Shock"	1	280	Sub vocal 2	Son Dongmyeong	105	105	53
6	Beast	"Shock"	1	280	Sub vocal 3	Choi Seunghyeok	61	61	66
6	Beast	"Shock"	1	280	Rapper 1	**Kim Dohyun**	22	22	88
6	Beast	"Shock"	1	280	Rapper 2	Jeong Hyojun	54	54	68
6	Beast	"Shock"	2	384	Main vocal	Cho Jinhyung	68	3068	24
6	Beast	"Shock"	2	384	Sub vocal 1	Lee Kiwon	112	3112	10
6	Beast	"Shock"	2	384	Sub vocal 2	Yoo Kyoungmok	93	3093	18
6	Beast	"Shock"	2	384	Sub vocal 3	Park Heeseok	5	3005	50
6	Beast	"Shock"	2	384	Rapper 1	Im Woohyeok	61	3061	28
6	Beast	"Shock"	2	384	Rapper 2	**Jeong Dongsu**	45	3045	31
7	Infinite	"Be Mine"	1	330 (avg:55)	Main vocal	Yoo Hoeseung	37	37	75
7	Infinite	"Be Mine"	1	330 (avg:55)	Sub vocal 1	**Kim Chan**	96	96	56
7	Infinite	"Be Mine"	1	330 (avg:55)	Sub vocal 2	Choi Heesoo	28	28	82
7	Infinite	"Be Mine"	1	330 (avg:55)	Sub vocal 3	Lee Jihan	39	39	74
7	Infinite	"Be Mine"	1	330 (avg:55)	Rapper 1	Choi Jaewoo	99	99	55
7	Infinite	"Be Mine"	1	330 (avg:55)	Rapper 2	Kim Yehyeon	31	31	77
7	Infinite	"Be Mine"	2	438 (avg:62.6)	Main vocal	Lee Woojin	87	3087	20
7	Infinite	"Be Mine"	2	438 (avg:62.6)	Sub vocal 1	Kim Donghyun	45	3045	31
7	Infinite	"Be Mine"	2	438 (avg:62.6)	Sub vocal 2	Jung Sewoon	46	3046	30
7	Infinite	"Be Mine"	2	438 (avg:62.6)	Sub vocal 3	Park Sungwoo	76	3076	21
7	Infinite	"Be Mine"	2	438 (avg:62.6)	Rapper 1	Lim Youngmin	33	3033	38
7	Infinite	"Be Mine"	2	438 (avg:62.6)	Rapper 2	**Lee Yoo-jin**	18	3018	46
7	Infinite	"Be Mine"	2	438 (avg:62.6)	Rapper 3	Kenta Takada	133	3133	6
8	BTS	"Boy in Luv"	1	494 (avg:70.6)	Main rapper	Lee Euiwoong	44	3044	33
8	BTS	"Boy in Luv"	1	494 (avg:70.6)	Sub rapper 1	Kim Samuel	34	3034	36
8	BTS	"Boy in Luv"	1	494 (avg:70.6)	Sub rapper 2	Joo Haknyeon	93	3093	18
8	BTS	"Boy in Luv"	1	494 (avg:70.6)	Vocal 1	Ha Sungwoon	39	3039	34
8	BTS	"Boy in Luv"	1	494 (avg:70.6)	Vocal 2	**Lee Daehwi**	105	3105	13
8	BTS	"Boy in Luv"	1	494 (avg:70.6)	Vocal 3	Bae Jinyoung	66	3066	26
8	BTS	"Boy in Luv"	1	494 (avg:70.6)	Vocal 4	Park Jihoon	113	3113	9
8	BTS	"Boy in Luv"	2	243 (avg:40.5)	Main rapper	Kim Sangbin	6	6	98
8	BTS	"Boy in Luv"	2	243 (avg:40.5)	Sub rapper 1	Lai Guanlin	79	79	61
8	BTS	"Boy in Luv"	2	243 (avg:40.5)	Sub rapper 2	Lee Insoo	27	27	83
8	BTS	"Boy in Luv"	2	243 (avg:40.5)	Vocal 1	Kang Dongho	86	86	58
8	BTS	"Boy in Luv"	2	243 (avg:40.5)	Vocal 2	**Jin Longguo**	15	15	92
8	BTS	"Boy in Luv"	2	243 (avg:40.5)	Vocal 3	Lee Gunmin	30	30	81

- (*) denotes the team with the highest score who can perform on M Countdown.
- **Bold** denotes the person who picked the team members.

== Position Evaluation Performances (Episodes 6–7) ==
Color key

- Winner
- Leader
- Center
- Leader and center

Performance				Name	Ranking					
Position	#	Artist	Song	Name	Team	Votes	Votes with bonus	Vocal	Dance	Rap
Vocal	1	Jung Seung-hwan	If It Was You	Kim Sungri	2	583	583	11		
Vocal	1	Jung Seung-hwan	If It Was You	Jin Longguo	1	633	10,633	3		
Vocal	1	Jung Seung-hwan	If It Was You	Kim Yehyeon	4	470	470	17		
Vocal	1	Jung Seung-hwan	If It Was You	Joo Jinwoo	3	499	499	16		
Vocal	6	Blackpink	Playing with Fire	Kang Dongho	2	551	551	13		
Vocal	6	Blackpink	Playing with Fire	Lee Daehwi	3	546	546	14		
Vocal	6	Blackpink	Playing with Fire	Jung Sewoon	1	584	10,584	5		
Vocal	6	Blackpink	Playing with Fire	Choi Min-ki	4	427	427	19		
Vocal	7	BTS	Spring Day	Lee Woojin	2	629	629	8		
Vocal	7	BTS	Spring Day	Bae Jinyoung	4	501	501	15		
Vocal	7	BTS	Spring Day	Yu Seonho	1	642	10,642	2		
Vocal	7	BTS	Spring Day	Takada Kenta	3	567	567	12		
Vocal	7	BTS	Spring Day	Kim Yongjin	5	441	441	18		
Vocal	11	BoA	Amazing Kiss	Lee Keonhee	1	717	110,717	1		
Vocal	11	BoA	Amazing Kiss	Yun Heeseok	4	627	627	9		
Vocal	11	BoA	Amazing Kiss	Jeong Dongsu	2	709	709	6		
Vocal	11	BoA	Amazing Kiss	Seo Sunghyuk	3	636	636	7		
Vocal	12	I.O.I	Downpour	Kim Jaehwan	1	622	10,622	4		
Vocal	12	I.O.I	Downpour	Yoon Jisung	4	358	358	21		
Vocal	12	I.O.I	Downpour	Hwang Minhyun	2	621	621	10		
Vocal	12	I.O.I	Downpour	Ha Sungwoon	3	416	416	20		
Vocal	12	I.O.I	Downpour	Kwon Hyunbin	5	349	349	22		
Dance	2	Flo Rida	Right Round	Yeo Hwanwoong	3	548	548		6	
Dance	2	Flo Rida	Right Round	Joo Haknyeon	1	581	10,581		2	
Dance	2	Flo Rida	Right Round	Hong Eunki	2	566	566		5	
Dance	2	Flo Rida	Right Round	Byun Hyunmin	4	524	524		10	
Dance	2	Flo Rida	Right Round	Kim Namhyung	6	379	379		19	
Dance	2	Flo Rida	Right Round	Yoo Hoeseung	5	402	402		17	
Dance	4	Ed Sheeran	Shape of You	Roh Taehyun	1	621	110,621		1	
Dance	4	Ed Sheeran	Shape of You	Park Sungwoo	6	474	474		13	
Dance	4	Ed Sheeran	Shape of You	Kim Taedong	2	534	534		7	
Dance	4	Ed Sheeran	Shape of You	Justin	3	528	528		8	
Dance	4	Ed Sheeran	Shape of You	Kim Donghan	4	525	525		9	
Dance	4	Ed Sheeran	Shape of You	Lee Junwoo	5	521	521		11	
Dance	8	NSYNC	Pop	Zhu Zhengting	1	537	10,537		4	
Dance	8	NSYNC	Pop	Park Woodam	5	355	355		21	
Dance	8	NSYNC	Pop	Lee Insoo	4	377	377		20	
Dance	8	NSYNC	Pop	Lee Kiwon	2	415	415		15	
Dance	8	NSYNC	Pop	Yoon Jaechan	3	382	382		18	
Dance	8	NSYNC	Pop	Kim Sangbin	6	283	283		24	
Dance	13	Jason Derulo	Get Ugly	Kim Samuel	6	350	350		23	
Dance	13	Jason Derulo	Get Ugly	Park Jihoon	2	498	498		12	
Dance	13	Jason Derulo	Get Ugly	Ong Seongwu	3	419	419		14	
Dance	13	Jason Derulo	Get Ugly	Kang Daniel	5	355	355		21	
Dance	13	Jason Derulo	Get Ugly	Ahn Hyeongseop	4	413	413		16	
Dance	13	Jason Derulo	Get Ugly	Park Woojin	1	542	10,542		3	
Rap	3	Zico	Boys and Girls	Lim Youngmin	1	651	10,651			2
Rap	3	Zico	Boys and Girls	Kim Dongbin	3	271	271			13
Rap	3	Zico	Boys and Girls	Kim Donghyun	2	456	456			10
Rap	5	Song Min-ho	Fear	Lai Guanlin	2	642	642			5
Rap	5	Song Min-ho	Fear	Kim Jonghyun	1	665	110,665			1
Rap	5	Song Min-ho	Fear	Jang Moonbok	4	227	227			14
Rap	5	Song Min-ho	Fear	Kim Taemin	3	496	496			9
Rap	9	SMTM5	I'm Not The Person You Used To Know	Woo Jinyoung	2	584	584			6
Rap	9	SMTM5	I'm Not The Person You Used To Know	Lee Euiwoong	4	542	542			8
Rap	9	SMTM5	I'm Not The Person You Used To Know	Kim Sangkyun	3	563	563			7
Rap	9	SMTM5	I'm Not The Person You Used To Know	Ha Minho	1	585	10,585			3
Rap	10	iKON	Rhythm Ta	Lee Gwanghyun	1	673	10,673			4
Rap	10	iKON	Rhythm Ta	Kim Taewoo	2	447	447			11
Rap	10	iKON	Rhythm Ta	Lee Yoo-jin	3	432	432			12

== Concept Evaluation Performances (Episode 9) ==
Color key

- Winner
- Leader
- Center
- Leader and center

Performance					Contestant			
Concept	#	Producer	Song	Votes	Position	Name	Votes	Rank
Nu Disco	1	Veethoven, Oh Sung-hwan, ASHTRAY & KINGMAKER	Show Time	135	Main vocal	Park Woodam	2	34
Nu Disco	1	Veethoven, Oh Sung-hwan, ASHTRAY & KINGMAKER	Show Time	135	Sub vocal	Roh Taehyun	6	30
Nu Disco	1	Veethoven, Oh Sung-hwan, ASHTRAY & KINGMAKER	Show Time	135	Sub vocal	Kim Samuel	41	16
Nu Disco	1	Veethoven, Oh Sung-hwan, ASHTRAY & KINGMAKER	Show Time	135	Sub vocal	Lee Woojin	3	33
Nu Disco	1	Veethoven, Oh Sung-hwan, ASHTRAY & KINGMAKER	Show Time	135	Sub vocal	Ha Sungwoon	34	21
Nu Disco	1	Veethoven, Oh Sung-hwan, ASHTRAY & KINGMAKER	Show Time	135	Rapper	Kim Sangkyun	12	27
Nu Disco	1	Veethoven, Oh Sung-hwan, ASHTRAY & KINGMAKER	Show Time	135	Rapper	Yoon Jisung	37	18
Synth Pop/Funk	2	Hyuk Shin	I Know You Know	83	Main vocal	Seo Sunghyuk	4	31
Synth Pop/Funk	2	Hyuk Shin	I Know You Know	83	Sub vocal	Kim Donghyun	15	25
Synth Pop/Funk	2	Hyuk Shin	I Know You Know	83	Sub vocal	Kim Yehyeon	2	34
Synth Pop/Funk	2	Hyuk Shin	I Know You Know	83	Sub vocal	Kim Taedong	13	26
Synth Pop/Funk	2	Hyuk Shin	I Know You Know	83	Sub vocal	Kim Donghan	10	28
Synth Pop/Funk	2	Hyuk Shin	I Know You Know	83	Rapper	Kwon Hyunbin	35	20
Synth Pop/Funk	2	Hyuk Shin	I Know You Know	83	Rapper	Jang Moonbok	4	31
Future EDM	3	Devine-Channel	Open up (열어줘)	552	Main vocal	Kang Dongho	78	6
Future EDM	3	Devine-Channel	Open up (열어줘)	552	Sub vocal	Kang Daniel	205	1
Future EDM	3	Devine-Channel	Open up (열어줘)	552	Sub vocal	Jin Longguo	58	10
Future EDM	3	Devine-Channel	Open up (열어줘)	552	Sub vocal	Joo Haknyeon	71	7
Future EDM	3	Devine-Channel	Open up (열어줘)	552	Sub vocal	Yu Seonho	59	9
Future EDM	3	Devine-Channel	Open up (열어줘)	552	Rapper	Takada Kenta	24	22
Future EDM	3	Devine-Channel	Open up (열어줘)	552	Rapper	Lim Youngmin	57	11
Hip Hop	4	Kiggen & ASSBRASS	Oh Little Girl	398	Main vocal	Jung Sewoon	36	19
Hip Hop	4	Kiggen & ASSBRASS	Oh Little Girl	398	Sub vocal	Lee Keonhee	7	29
Hip Hop	4	Kiggen & ASSBRASS	Oh Little Girl	398	Sub vocal	Ahn Hyeongseop	48	14
Hip Hop	4	Kiggen & ASSBRASS	Oh Little Girl	398	Sub vocal	Choi Min-ki	21	24
Hip Hop	4	Kiggen & ASSBRASS	Oh Little Girl	398	Sub vocal	Bae Jinyoung	82	5
Hip Hop	4	Kiggen & ASSBRASS	Oh Little Girl	398	Rapper	Park Jihoon	182	2
Hip Hop	4	Kiggen & ASSBRASS	Oh Little Girl	398	Rapper	Lee Euiwoong	22	23
Deep House	5	Triple H	NEVER	443	Main vocal	Kim Jaehwan	52	13
Deep House	5	Triple H	NEVER	443	Sub vocal	Kim Jonghyun	57	11
Deep House	5	Triple H	NEVER	443	Sub vocal	Hwang Minhyun	91	4
Deep House	5	Triple H	NEVER	443	Sub vocal	Ong Seongwu	40	17
Deep House	5	Triple H	NEVER	443	Sub vocal	Lee Daehwi	60	8
Deep House	5	Triple H	NEVER	443	Rapper	Lai Guanlin	48	14
Deep House	5	Triple H	NEVER	443	Rapper	Park Woojin	95	3

== Debut Evaluation Performances (Episode 11) ==
Color key

- Leader
- Center

Performance			Contestant	
#	Producer	Song	Position	Name
1	Ryan S. Jhun	Super Hot	Main vocal	Ha Sungwoon
1	Ryan S. Jhun	Super Hot	Sub vocal 1	Kim Samuel
1	Ryan S. Jhun	Super Hot	Sub vocal 2	Kang Dongho
1	Ryan S. Jhun	Super Hot	Sub vocal 3	Yoo Seonho
1	Ryan S. Jhun	Super Hot	Sub vocal 4	Ahn Hyungseob
1	Ryan S. Jhun	Super Hot	Sub vocal 5	Lee Daehwi
1	Ryan S. Jhun	Super Hot	Sub vocal 6	Choi Min-ki
1	Ryan S. Jhun	Super Hot	Rapper 1	Lim Youngmin
1	Ryan S. Jhun	Super Hot	Rapper 2	Kim Jonghyun
1	Ryan S. Jhun	Super Hot	Rapper 3	Lai Kuanlin
2	The Underdogs & Deez	Hands On Me	Main vocal	Kim Jaehwan
2	The Underdogs & Deez	Hands On Me	Sub vocal 1	Kang Daniel
2	The Underdogs & Deez	Hands On Me	Sub vocal 2	Ong Seongwu
2	The Underdogs & Deez	Hands On Me	Sub vocal 3	Bae Jinyoung
2	The Underdogs & Deez	Hands On Me	Sub vocal 4	Hwang Minhyun
2	The Underdogs & Deez	Hands On Me	Sub vocal 5	Jeong Sewoon
2	The Underdogs & Deez	Hands On Me	Sub vocal 6	Ju Haknyeon
2	The Underdogs & Deez	Hands On Me	Sub vocal 7	Yoon Jisung
2	The Underdogs & Deez	Hands On Me	Rapper 1	Park Woojin
2	The Underdogs & Deez	Hands On Me	Rapper 2	Park Jihoon

== Notes ==
- ^{1}Kim Jae-hwan was a contestant on the second season of competition show Korea's Got Talent.
  He won the SBS competition show Vocal War: God's Voice pilot but failed to obtain another victory in the second episode.
  He was also a member of the disbanded group ShelRock (셜록).
- ^{2}The individual trainee Lee In-soo (also known as Jaguar) and the HF Music Company trainee Jeong Won-cheol (also known as Ado) were members of the disbanded group A6P.
  Lee In-soo was also a contestant on competition show Boys24.
- ^{3}The 2able Company trainee Ju Won-Tak (also known as Roel) is a member of Underdog whereas the Wings Entertainment trainee Kim Yong-jin is a former member.
- ^{4}Noh Tae-hyun (also known as Kid Monster) and Ha Sung-woon are members of HOTSHOT.
- ^{5}Yoon Yong-bin was a participant on the 6th episode of the third season of music show I Can See Your Voice .
- ^{6}Arredondo Samuel (also known as Kim Samuel or Punch) was a member of the disbanded duo 1Punch and appeared in the reality web show Seventeen TV.
- ^{7}Kim Seong-lee was a member of the disbanded group K-BOYS and appeared on the 10th episode of the first season of music show I Can See Your Voice .
- ^{8}Cho Jin-hyung was a contestant on the MBC competition show Super Idol.
- ^{9}Kim Do-hyun (also known as Konan) and Park Hee-seok (also known as K-Bean) are members of the duo X10.
- ^{10}Wang Min-hyeok (also known as Rown) was a member of the disbanded group NPI (New Planet Icons).
- ^{11}After the release of episode 6, Kim Tae-min left the show due to an illness.
- ^{12}Kim Sang-kyun (also known as A-Tom) is a member of Topp Dogg.
- ^{13}Lee Seo-kyu and Han Min-ho (also known as EnL) are members of Pureboy.
- ^{14}Three weeks before the beginning of the broadcast (but after the release of the "Pick Me" MV where he appears), Han Jong-youn left the show because of a bullying scandal.
- ^{15}Lee Woo-jin is a member of TheEastLight. and a former The Voice Kids contestant.
- ^{16}Kim Jae-han (also known as J.Han) was a member of the disbanded group OneVoices.
- ^{17}Lee Yoo-jin is the son of famous actor Lee Hyo-jung.
- ^{18}Kim Tae-woo is a member of Rion Five.
- ^{19}Jang Moon-vok was a contestant on competition show Superstar K2.
- ^{20}Kang Dong-ho (also known as Baekho), Kim Jong-hyun (also known as JR), Choi Min-ki (also known as Ren) and Hwang Min-hyun are members of NU'EST.
- ^{21}Son Dong-myeong is a member of MAS (formerly known as MAS 0094).
- ^{22}Kim Nam-hyung (also known as Kino) and Jeong Dong-su (also known as Rio) are members of OFFROAD.
- ^{23}Lee Gwang-hyun was a contestant on competition show Boys24.
- ^{24}Jung Se-woon was a contestant on competition show K-pop Star 3 and made it to the Top10 as part of the singer-songwriter duo Something (formed during the Team mission).
- ^{25}Choi Jun-young (also known as Jooen) is a member of AFOS.
- ^{26}Kim Chan-yul (also known as Yul) and Choi Ha-don (also known as San-Cheong) are members of JJCC.
- ^{27}Kim Tae-dong was a contestant on competition show Boys24.
- ^{28}After the release of episode 5, Ha Min-ho left the show because of a sexual harassment scandal.
- ^{29}Yoo Kyoung-mok (also known as Yu A) is a former member of BoM (Blooming of our Music) and BTL.
- ^{30}Lee Eui-woong was a featured guest on the episode 265 of the variety show Hello Counselor.
- ^{31}Before the first episode was aired on April 7, 2017, it was revealed that two trainees had left the show: Kim Shi-hyun (Choon Entertainment) and Nam Yoon-sung (I.One Entertainment) due to health reasons.
