= The Feelings (EP) =

- Digital cover

EP by WEi
- Released: January 15, 2025
- Length: 13:37
- Language: Korean
- Label: Oui Entertainment; Kakao Entertainment

WEi chronology
Wave (2024)	The Feelings (2025)

Singles from The Feelings
- 1. "Not Enough" Released: January 15, 2025

The Feelings is the seventh extended play by South Korean boy group WEi. It was released on January 15, 2025, by Oui Entertainment and comprises five tracks, with "Not Enough" serving as the lead single.

== Background and release ==
On December 6, 2024, Oui Entertainment announced that WEi would release their seventh EP The Feelings on January 15, 2025. Member Yohan did not be participate in the album promotions due to schedule conflicts. On December 8, WEi announced plans to hold a showcase concert in Korea on the album's release date. On December 19, WEi announced they would be holding fan concerts in Taiwan on February 15 and 16. On December 25, WEi announced they would be holding concerts in Japan on February 1 and February 8. The promotion plan was postponed after the Jeju Air Flight 2216 airplane collision, leading the country to institute a period of mourning in response to the tragedy. On January 6, the track list was released, with "Not Enough" announced as the lead single. On January 7, the highlight medley video was released. Music video teasers for the lead single were released on January 13 and 14.

== Composition ==
The Feelings consists of five tracks and is described as an album that expresses various emotions related to love, such as confusion, excitement, frustration, and anxiety that youth can feel. The tracks "Fake Love" and "Without U" are Korean versions of the tracks from the group's Japanese EP Wave. The lead single "Not Enough" is an emo hip-hop genre with a shoegaze sound that expresses a confused heart of longing and fear in the midst of an endless wait with a dreamy and sad melody. It contains all the emotions that anyone can feel when they're in love, by expressing the desperation of love and confusion about feelings. The second track "143 ILY" expresses the member's love language in numbers. The third track "Fake Love" uses WEi's distinctive vocals, a witty electric guitar sound, and straightforward lyrics that convey the pain of parting and regretting your past self who was deeply in love with a beloved lover. The fourth track "Top Shape" confidently seduces another person with the R&B genre and stands out with its heavy 808 bass. The fifth track "Without U" expresses an anxious heart towards love using an acoustic guitar and sweet vocals.

== Promotion ==
Following the release of The Feelings, WEi held a media showcase and a showcase concert to introduce the extended play and communicate with their fans. The group performed all the tracks of the extended play while also performing previously released songs during the concert. The group's promotions for the song "Not Enough" began on January 17, 2025, on Mnet's M Countdown.

== Track listing ==
The Feelings track listing
No.	Title	Lyrics	Music	Arrangement	Length
1.	"Not Enough"	Jang Dae-hyeon; Ryan Shin	RYVNG (Stupid Squad); Jang Dae-hyeon; Ryan Shin; Maynine (Stupid Squad); Oh Hyeungseok (Stupid Squad)	RYVNG (Stupid Squad); Maynine (Stupid Squad); Oh Hyeungseok (Stupid Squad)	3:00
2.	"143 ILY"	SOOYOON	Moon Kim; Delarge; SOOYOON	Delarge; Moon Kim	2:51
3.	"Fake Love"	CiELO; Moode (CIELOGROOVE)	CiELO; Moode (CIELOGROOVE)	CiELO	2:30
4.	"Top Shape"	Samson; ZWOO; Chicok	Chicok; ZWOO; Samson; Jword; Su Hyuk; Nino	ZWOO; Chicok	2:45
5.	"Without U" (겁이나)	Jang Dae-hyeon; RYVNG (Stupid Squad); OH Hyeongseok (Stupid Squad); Maynine (Stupid Squad); h.toyosaki	Jang Dae-hyeon; RYVNG (Stupid Squad); OH Hyeongseok (Stupid Squad); Maynine (Stupid Squad)	Jang Dae-hyeon; RYVNG (Stupid Squad); OH Hyeongseok (Stupid Squad); Maynine (Stupid Squad); h.toyosaki	2:31
Total length:					13:37

== Charts ==
=== Weekly charts ===
Weekly chart performance for The Feelings
Chart (2025)	Peak position
South Korean Albums (Circle)	2

=== Monthly charts ===
Monthly chart performance for The Feelings
Chart (2025)	Position
South Korean Albums (Circle)	13

== Release history ==
Region	Date	Format	Label
Various	January 15, 2025	CD	Oui Entertainment; Kakao Entertainment
Various	January 15, 2025	Digital download; streaming	Oui Entertainment; Kakao Entertainment
