= Identity: Challenge =

- Digital cover

EP by WEi
- Released: February 24, 2021
- Recorded: 2021
- Length: 17:35
- Language: Korean
- Label: Oui Entertainment; Kakao M

WEi chronology
| Identity: First Sight (2020) | Identity: Challenge (2021) | Identity: Action (2021) |

Singles from Identity: Challenge
- 1. "All or Nothing" Released: February 24, 2021

Identity: Challenge is the second extended play by South Korean boy group WEi. It was released by Oui Entertainment on February 24, 2021 and contains five tracks, including the lead single "All or Nothing".

== Background and release ==
On February 7, 2021, it was announced the group would release their second extended play Identity: Challenge on February 24. On February 17, the track list was released, with "All or Nothing" announced as the lead single. The next day, the highlight medley video was released. Music video teasers for the lead single were released on February 20 and February 23, respectively.

== Composition ==
Identity: Challenge consists of five tracks about the group becoming one by overcoming challenges and trials. The lead single "All or Nothing" is a hybrid trap song produced by member Jang Dae-hyeon in order to show a strong and powerful performance. The second track "Breathing" is a future bass song that expresses the desire to approach someone who breathed life into them while they were in the dark and gave them hopes and dreams. The third track "Dancing in the Dark" is described as overcoming difficulties as if dancing in the dark and finding someone like a dream. The fourth track "Diffuser" is a sweet R&B song that expresses the desire to comfort and strengthen others by becoming a perfume and covering them warmly. The fifth track "Winter, Flower" is a R&B ballad, described as an emotional expression of gratitude towards their fans named RUi.

== Promotion ==
Following the release of Identity: Challenge, WEi held an online showcase on the same date to introduce the extended play and communicate with their fans. The group performed "All or Nothing" and "Diffuser" during the showcase. The group's promotions for the song "All or Nothing" began on February 25, 2021, on Mnet's M Countdown. The B-side track "Diffuser" was also performed during the group's promotions. "Winter, Flower" was performed on KBS2's You Hee-yeol's Sketchbook on March 5.

== Track listing ==
Identity: Challenge track listing
| No. | Title | Lyrics | Music | Arrangement | Length |
|---|---|---|---|---|---|
| 1. | "All or Nothing" (모 아님 도 Prod. Jang Daehyeon) | Jang Dae-hyeon; RYVNG (Stupid Squad); Maynine (Stupid Squad); Kang Seok-hwa; Kim Dong-han | Jang Dae-hyeon; RYVNG (Stupid Squad); Maynine (Stupid Squad) | Jang Dae-hyeon; RYVNG (Stupid Squad); Maynine (Stupid Squad) | 3:26 |
| 2. | "Breathing" | Kim Soo Yoon | STAINBOYS; Moon Kim; Kim Soo Yoon | STAINBOYS | 3:20 |
| 3. | "Dancing in the Dark" | YOSKE; ALIVE KNOB | YOSKE; ALIVE KNOB; SEAN OH | YOSKE; ALIVE KNOB; SEAN OH | 3:24 |
| 4. | "Diffuser" | OUOW; Kim Jun-seo | OUOW; Woojae | OUOW; Woojae | 3:19 |
| 5. | "Winter, Flower" (겨울, 꽃) | $UN; rudbeckia; Lee Yumi | $UN; STAINBOYS; Park Ji Eun | STAINBOYS; Park Ji Eun | 4:06 |
| Total length: | | | | | 17:35 |

== Charts ==
=== Weekly charts ===
Weekly chart performance for Identity: Challenge
| Chart (2022) | Peak position |
|---|---|
| South Korean Albums (Gaon) | 4 |
| Japan Albums (Oricon) | 21 |

=== Monthly charts ===
Monthly chart performance for Identity: Challenge
| Chart (2022) | Peak position |
|---|---|
| South Korean Albums (Gaon) | 9 |

== Release history ==
| Region | Date | Format | Label |
|---|---|---|---|
| Various | February 24, 2021 | CD | Oui Entertainment; Kakao M |
| Various | February 24, 2021 | Digital download; streaming | Oui Entertainment; Kakao M |
