= Feelings (disambiguation) =

Feelings may refer to:

- Feelings, the plural of feeling
- Emotion

== Books ==
- Feelings (Hyde book), a 1975 collection of writings by Evan X Hyde
- Feelings (Aliki book), a 1984 book by Aliki Brandenberg

== Film and television ==
- Feelings (1968 film), Soviet film
- Feelings (1974 film), British film directed by Gerry O'Hara
- Feelings (2003 film), French film
- "Feelings" (Our Girl), a 2014 television episode

== Music ==
=== Albums ===
- Feelings, Paul Anka album, 1975
- Feelings (Johnny Mathis album), 1975
- Feelings (Milt Jackson album), 1976
- Feelings (Ferrante & Teicher album), 1977
- Feelings (David Byrne album), 1997
- Feelings (The Grass Roots album), 1968
- The Feelings (EP), a 2025 EP by WEi

=== Songs ===
- "Feelings" (Hayley Kiyoko song), 2017
- "Feelings" (Lauv song), 2019
- "Feelings" (Maroon 5 song), 2015
- "Feelings" (Morris Albert song), 1975
- "Feelings" (The Grass Roots song), 1968
- "Feelings" (Zonke song), 2012
- "Feelings", by Miči, Frigid Armadillo, Sun-El Musician from Feelings, 2024
- "Feelings", by PinkPantheress from Heaven Knows, 2023
- "Feelings", by Stan Walker from All In, 2022

== See also ==
- Feeling (disambiguation)
- Feelin's (disambiguation)
- "Feelins'", a 1975 song by Conway Twitty and Loretta Lynn
- "Feelin'", a 1991 song by the La's
- The Feeling, a British band
- Mixed feelings, ambivalence
- No Hard Feelings (disambiguation)
- Hard Feelings (disambiguation)
