= Love Pt. 3: Eternally =

- Digital cover

EP by WEi
- Released: June 29, 2023
- Recorded: 2023
- Length: 16:49
- Language: Korean
- Labels: Oui Entertainment; Kakao Entertainment

WEi chronology
Love Pt. 2: Passion (2022)	Love Pt. 3: Eternally (2023)	Wave (2024)

Singles from Love Pt. 3: Eternally
- 1. "Overdrive" Released: June 29, 2023

Love Pt. 3: Eternally is the sixth extended play by South Korean boy group WEi. It was released by Oui Entertainment on June 29, 2023, and contains five tracks, including the lead single "Overdrive".

== Background and release ==
On May 31, 2023, it was announced the group would release their sixth extended play Love Pt. 2: Passion on June 29 while also holding a concert WEi Showcase Concert: Eternal Sunshine. On June 11, the track list was released, with "Overdrive" announced as the lead single. On June 15, the highlight medley video was released. Music video teasers for the lead single were released on June 23 and June 27, respectively.

== Composition ==
Love Pt. 3: Eternally consists of five tracks and as the last album in the group's Love trilogy, expresses a love that we should give to ourselves, rather than a love we give to others expressed in the previous albums. The lead single "Overdrive" is a song that combines a cool guitar sound with an exciting dance beat that expresses embarking on a journey at full speed and ultimately finding and loving oneself that resonates with the anxiety and worries of youth. The second track "Be Alright (chillin')" is a song with a Latin music groove with a guitar riff and moombahton beat that expresses a passionate mood when facing someone and looking into their eyes. The third track "Thriller" is a song with a heavy bass that expresses the thrill of falling for someone at an unknown depth. The fourth track "All Day With You" is a R&B song with a nostalgic 90s vibe along with a lofi hip hop groove. The fifth track "End Of The Day" is a song that brings warm and comforting emotions to someone who remembers the end of a hard day at work.

== Promotion ==
A day prior to the release of Love Pt. 3: Eternally, WEi held a showcase concert to introduce the extended play and communicate with their fans. The group performed all the tracks of the extended play while also performing previously released songs during the concert. The group's promotions for the song "Overdrive" began on June 29, 2023, on Mnet's M Countdown. The B-side track "Thriller" was also performed during the group's promotions. A special music video featuring "End of the Day" was released on July 1 to celebrate the group's 1000 day anniversary since debut. The group released their first English track, an English version of "Overdrive", on July 10.

== Track listing ==
Love Pt. 3: Eternally track listing
No.	Title	Lyrics	Music	Arrangement	Length
1.	"Overdrive" (질주)	OSKAR (HIGHBRID); HOW (HIGHBRID); Jang Dae-hyeon; Ninos Hanna; Ronnie Icon	T-lack (HIGHBRID); SIROO (HIGHBRID); OSKAR (HIGHBRID); Ninos Hanna; Ronnie Icon; Jang Dae-hyeon	T-lack (HIGHBRID); SIROO (HIGHBRID); OSKAR (HIGHBRID)	3:15
2.	"Be Alright (Chillin')"	MosPick; Moon Hanmiru (220volt); gxxdkelvin	MosPick; Moon Hanmiru (220volt)	MosPick	3:20
3.	"Thriller"	CiELO; JOOAN	CiELO; JOOAN; COUGAR	CiELO; COUGAR	3:06
4.	"All Day with You" (너의 행성)	Warmit (MonoTree)	G-high (MonoTree); Ra.D	G-high (MonoTree)	3:13
5.	"End of the Day" (하루 끝에)	Young Jay; Im Hyunsik; Lee Jae In (ZAYSTIN)	Lim Hyunsik (BTOB); Lee Jae In (ZAYSTIN; Han Sang Wook)	Lim Hyunsik (BTOB); Lee Jae In (ZAYSTIN; Han Sang Wook)	3:55
Total length:					16:49

== Charts ==
Chart performance for Love Pt. 3: Eternally
Chart (2023)	Peak position
Japanese Albums (Oricon)	33
South Korean Albums (Circle)	9

== Release history ==
Release history and formats for Love Pt. 3: Eternally
Region	Date	Format	Label
Various	June 29, 2023	CD	Oui Entertainment; Kakao Entertainment
Various	June 29, 2023	Digital download; streaming	Oui Entertainment; Kakao Entertainment
