= Love Pt. 2: Passion =

- Digital cover

EP by WEi
- Released: October 19, 2022
- Recorded: 2022
- Length: 20:23
- Language: Korean
- Labels: Oui Entertainment; Kakao Entertainment

WEi chronology
Youth (2022)	Love Pt. 2: Passion (2022)	Love Pt. 3: Eternally (2023)

Singles from Love Pt. 2: Passion
- 1. "Spray" Released: October 19, 2022

Love Pt. 2: Passion is the fifth extended play by South Korean boy group WEi. It was released by Oui Entertainment on October 19, 2022 and contains six tracks, including the lead single "Spray".

== Background and release ==
On October 6, 2022, it was announced the group would release their fifth extended play Love Pt. 2: Passion on October 19. On March 8, the track list was released, with "Spray" announced as the lead single. On October 14, the highlight medley video was released. Music video teasers for the lead single were released on October 17 and October 18, respectively.

== Composition ==
Love Pt. 2: Passion consists of six tracks and is described as expressing love with passion and confidence while depicting the growing pains of love experienced by youth. The opening track "Moonlight" is a love song with a charming disco funk bassline that expresses a love felt under a night sky. The lead single "Spray" is a song that declares you will be covered with their colors as if drawing graffiti on a canvas. The third track "Higher Ground" is a song which captures the passion of love. The fourth track "Rose" is a song that expresses the feelings of falling in love with one's charms that resemble a rose. The fifth track "Special Holiday" is a song which compares every day of life with someone you love to a special holiday. The sixth track "Umbrella" is a song which promises to always be by your side.

== Promotion ==
Following the release of Love Pt. 2: Passion, WEi held a media showcase and a fan showcase on the same date to introduce the extended play and communicate with their fans. The group performed "Spray", "Higher Ground", and "Moonlight" during the showcase. The group's promotions for the song "Spray" began on October 20, 2022, on Mnet's M Countdown. The B-side track "Higher Ground'" was also performed during the group's promotions. "Rose" was performed during the fan concert Merry RUi Day. A special music video featuring "Special Holiday" was released on December 12. "Moonlight" was performed on Arirang TV's Simply K-Pop on January 12, 2023.

== Track listing ==
Love Pt. 2: Passion track listing
No.	Title	Lyrics	Music	Arrangement	Length
1.	"Moonlight"	Junzo (NEWTYPE); Corbin (NEWTYPE); 1Take (NEWTYPE)	Junzo (NEWTYPE); Corbin (NEWTYPE); 1Take (NEWTYPE)	Junzo (NEWTYPE); Corbin (NEWTYPE); 1Take (NEWTYPE)	3:29
2.	"Spray"	OUOW; Jang Dae-hyeon	OUOW	OUOW	3:17
3.	"Higher Ground"	Yuki; Ulti; zomay; Kang Yeon Wook; Yoon Sang Cho; Yoon Ho Gi	Yuki; zomay; Ulti; Kang Yeon Wook; Yoon Sang Cho; Yoon Ho Gi	Yuki; Kang Yeon Wook; zomay; Yoon Sang Cho	3:11
4.	"Rose"	Kohway; Young Jay	Kohway; Jeon Jin; Young Jay	Jeon Jin	3:39
5.	"Special Holiday"	STAINBOYS; NU'MAKER	STAINBOYS; NU'MAKER	STAINBOYS	3:28
6.	"Umbrella" (우산)	YOSKE; Kim Mi Ryang (ALIVE KNOB)	YOSKE; KYUM LYK; Ovrlap; SOONG (ALIVE KNOB)	KYUM LYK; Ovrlap)	3:19
Total length:					20:23

== Charts ==
=== Weekly charts ===
Weekly chart performance for Love Pt. 2: Passion
Chart (2022–2023)	Peak position
Japanese Albums (Oricon)	36
South Korean Albums (Circle)	3

=== Monthly charts ===
Monthly chart performance for Love Pt. 2: Passion
Chart (2022)	Peak position
South Korean Albums (Circle)	10

=== Year-end charts ===
Year-end chart performance for Love Pt. 2: Passion
Chart (2022)	Position
South Korean Albums (Circle)	99

== Release history ==
Release history and formats for Love Pt. 2: Passion
Region	Date	Format	Label
Various	October 19, 2022	CD	Oui Entertainment; Kakao Entertainment
Various	October 19, 2022	Digital download; streaming	Oui Entertainment; Kakao Entertainment
