= WEi =

South Korean boy group

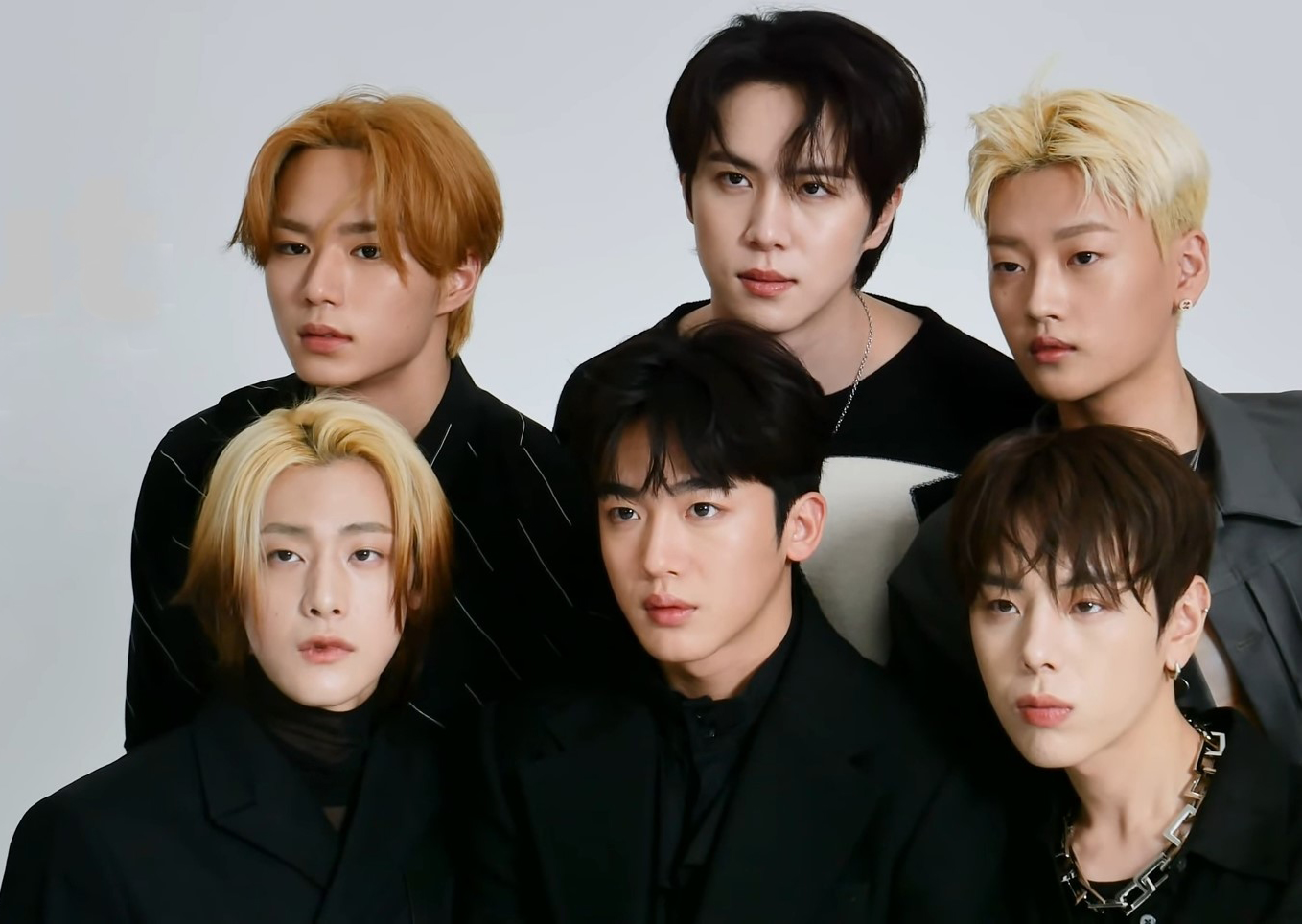
- WEi for Marie Claire Korea in 2022; Top, L–R: Kim Jun-seo, Kim Dong-han, Kang Seok-hwa; Bottom, L–R: Yoo Yong-ha, Kim Yo-han, Jang Dae-hyeon

Background information
- Origin: Seoul, South Korea
- Genre: K-pop
- Years active: 2020–present
- Label: Oui
- Members: Jang Dae-hyeon; Kim Dong-han; Yoo Yong-ha; Kim Yo-han; Kang Seok-hwa; Kim Jun-seo

WEi (Korean: 위아이; RR: Wi Ai; Japanese: ウィーアイ) is a South Korean boy band formed by Oui Entertainment. The group consists of six members: Jang Dae-hyeon, Kim Dong-han, Yoo Yong-ha, Kim Yo-han, Kang Seok-hwa, and Kim Jun-seo. The group made their debut on October 5, 2020, with their extended play Identity: First Sight.

== Name ==
The group's name, WEi, combines the words "We" and "I", meaning that we are one and will make music as one.

== History ==
=== Pre-debut ===
Jang Dae-hyeon and Kim Dong-han were contestants on the Mnet reality survival show Produce 101 Season 2. Kim Dong-han finished in 29th place, and Jang in 83rd place. After the show, Kim Dong-han debuted in JBJ, while Jang debuted in Rainz. Both groups were active for a period of time and each eventually disbanded in 2018. Kim Dong-han and Jang then made their solo debuts in June 2018 and July 2019, respectively.

Kang Seok-hwa was a YG Entertainment trainee who participated in YG Treasure Box, but did not make it into the show's final debut lineup.

Yoo Yong-ha and Kim Jun-seo were contestants in Under Nineteen and both became members of the debut lineup, finishing in 6th and 9th place, respectively. They debuted as members of 1the9 on April 13, 2019, and officially disbanded as a group on August 8, 2020.

Kim Yo-han and Kang were contestants in Produce X 101. Kim Yo-han represented Oui Entertainment, despite having only three months of training beforehand. Kang competed as an individual trainee and was eliminated after finishing in 35th place. He then signed with Oui a month later, under Kim Yo-han's recommendation. Kim Yo-han finished in 1st place, and debuted as a member and the center of X1 on August 27, 2019. However, X1 disbanded on January 6, 2020, due to the Mnet vote manipulation investigation.

=== 2020–2021: Debut with Identity series ===
The group was announced in May 2020 by Oui, through individual profile videos, under the temporary name OuiBoys. The group's name was later announced to be WEi. They debuted with their first EP Identity: First Sight on October 5, 2020, with the lead single "Twilight".

On February 24, 2021, WEi returned with their second EP Identity: Challenge and its lead single "All Or Nothing".

On June 9, WEi released their third EP Identity: Action and its lead single "Bye Bye Bye".

On October 1, WEi released the promotional single "Starry Night (Prod. Dress)" through Universe Music for the mobile application, Universe.

=== 2022–2023: Love series, world tours, and Japanese debut ===
On March 16, 2022, WEi released their fourth EP Love Pt. 1: First Love and its lead single "Too Bad".

On July 18, 2022, WEi announced their first world tour WEi World Tour: First Love in September 2022. The group visited 15 cities in 6 countries, including Thailand, Japan, the United States of America, Canada, Mexico, and Chile.

On August 11, 2022, WEi made their Japanese debut with the EP Youth and its lead single "Maldives".

On September 14, 2022, it was confirmed that WEi would make a new album in October. Their fifth EP Love Pt. 2: Passion and its lead single "Spray" was released on October 19.

On December 10 and 11, 2022, WEi held a two-day fan concert Merry RUi Day, along with releasing a special Christmas album Gift For You on December 13.

On February 27, 2023, WEi announced their second world tour WEi 2nd World Tour: Passion in April 2023. The group visited 10 cities in 5 countries, including Japan, England, Germany, the United States, and Mexico. Kim Yo-han did not take part in the tour due to his personal schedule.

On May 29, 2023, it was confirmed that WEi would release new music in June. The group released their sixth EP Love Pt. 3: Eternally and its lead single "Overdrive" on June 29, along with holding a concert Eternal Sunshine on the day prior.

=== 2024: Wave and Love2You ===
On January 18, 2024, it was confirmed that WEi would release their second Japanese EP Wave and its lead single "Fake Love" on February 14, along with holding two concerts titled The Wave in Japan. Kim Yo-han did not participate in the album promotions due to schedule conflicts.

On July 28, 2024, it was announced that WEi would release a digital single album Love2You on August 30. The comeback features all 6 members, however member Kim Yo-han could not participate in the song promotions.

On September 2, 2024, it was announced in a statement that member Jang Dae-hyeon was preparing for the mandatory military service. However, on October 2, 2024, the agency announced that the enlistment was postponed after a physical examination.

=== 2025: The Feelings, Kim Jun-seo's hiatus, and Wonderland ===
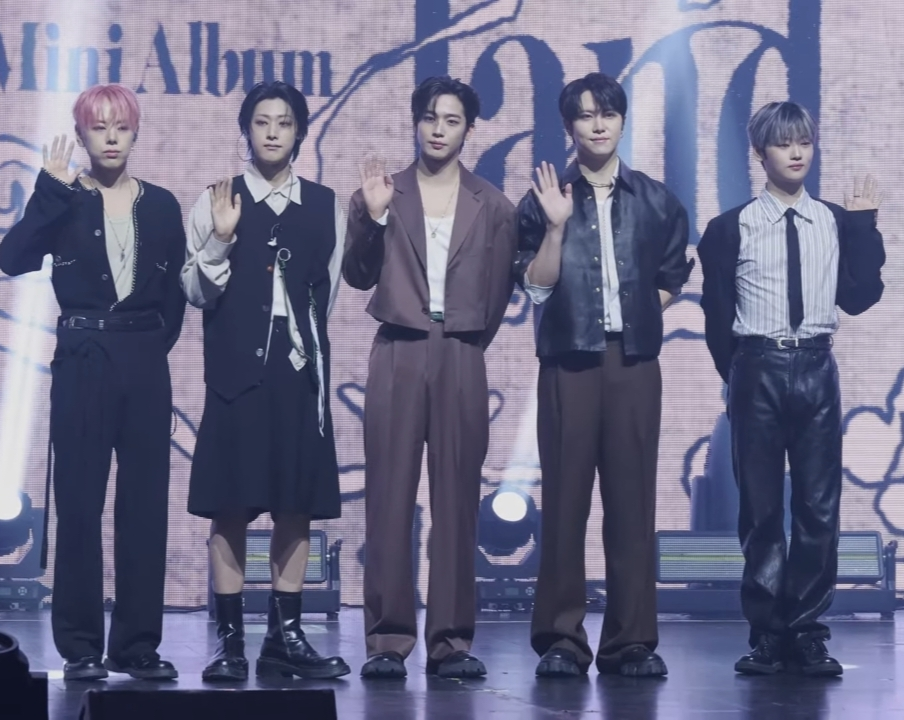
WEi at the showcase for Wonderland in October 2025

On January 15, 2025, WEi released their seventh EP The Feelings and its lead single "Not Enough", along with holding a showcase concert. Kim Yo-han could not participate in this comeback due to schedule conflicts.

On May 9, 2025, it was announced in a statement that member Kim Jun-seo would temporarily halt group activities. He was later revealed as a contestant on the show Boys II Planet. He finished the show in 8th place, and has been active as a member of the boy group Alpha Drive One since early 2026.

On August 22, 2025, it was confirmed that WEi would have another comeback in the second half of 2025, without member Kim Jun-seo because of his participation in Boys II Planet, and with member Kim Yo-han resuming musical activities with WEi. On October 1, 2025 it was announced that WEi would make a comeback on October 29, 2025 with their eighth EP Wonderland and its lead single "Home", along with holding a showcase concert. Kim Yo-han participated in all scheduled events to promote the album until December 8.

On November 19, 2025, it was announced in a statement that member Jang Dae-hyeon was scheduled to fulfill his mandatory military service in 2026; while no precise date of enlistment was communicated, it was stated that he would participate in Wonderland release events until January 2026.

=== 2026–present: Focus on individual activities, military enlistments, and contract expirations ===
On March 25, 2026, it was announced through a statement that all members of WEi would concentrate on individual activities in the near future, pursuing solo activities while continuing to promote under the name WEi. On March 27, the digital single "Save" was released to celebrate the 2000th day since debut.

On August 9, it was announced through a statement that member Kim Dong-han was scheduled to enlist as an active-duty soldier in the Army on September 7. On August 25, Oui Entertainment announced that the exclusive contracts of members Kim Dong-han and Yoo Yong-ha had ended upon expiration. On August 28, it was announced through a statement that member Yoo Yong-ha was scheduled to enlist as an active-duty soldier in the Army on September 28.

== Members ==
- Jang Dae-hyeon (장대현)
- Kim Dong-han (김동한)
- Yoo Yong-ha (유용하)
- Kim Yo-han (김요한)
- Kang Seok-hwa (강석화)
- Kim Jun-seo (김준서)

== Discography ==
=== Extended plays ===
==== Korean extended plays ====
List of extended plays, showing selected details, selected chart positions, and sales figures
Title	Details	Peak chart positions		Sales
Title	Details	KOR	JPN	Sales
Identity: First Sight	Released: October 5, 2020; Label: Oui Entertainment, Kakao M; Formats: CD, digital download, streaming	3	59	KOR: 67,501; JPN: 1,525
Identity: Challenge	Released: February 24, 2021; Label: Oui Entertainment, Kakao M; Formats: CD, digital download, streaming	4	21	KOR: 71,702; JPN: 4,797
Identity: Action	Released: June 9, 2021; Label: Oui Entertainment, Kakao Entertainment; Formats: CD, digital download, streaming	3	20	KOR: 89,890; JPN: 3,027
Love Pt. 1: First Love	Released: March 16, 2022; Label: Oui Entertainment, Kakao Entertainment; Formats: CD, digital download, streaming	5	39	KOR: 124,251; JPN: 1,699
Love Pt. 2: Passion	Released: October 19, 2022; Label: Oui Entertainment, Kakao Entertainment; Formats: CD, digital download, streaming	3	36	KOR: 140,158; JPN: 2,300
Love Pt. 3: Eternally	Released: June 29, 2023; Label: Oui Entertainment, Kakao Entertainment; Formats: CD, digital download, streaming	9	33	KOR: 132,734; JPN: 1,315
The Feelings	Released: January 15, 2025; Label: Oui Entertainment, Kakao Entertainment; Formats: CD, digital download, streaming	2	—	KOR: 56,733
Wonderland	Released: October 29, 2025; Label: Oui Entertainment, Kakao Entertainment; Formats: CD, digital download, streaming	10	—	KOR: 54,986
"—" denotes a recording that did not chart or was not released in that territory

==== Japanese extended plays ====
List of Japanese extended plays, showing selected details, selected chart positions, and sales figures
Title	Details	Peak chart positions		Sales
Title	Details	JPN	JPN Hot	Sales
Youth	Released: August 11, 2022; Label: Oui Entertainment, Imx Inc; Formats: CD, digital download, streaming	3	44	JPN: 22,127
Wave	Released: February 14, 2024; Label: Oui Entertainment, KISS Entertainment; Formats: CD, digital download, streaming	20	13	JPN: 4,888

=== Single albums ===
List of single albums and showing selected details
Title	Details
Gift for You	Released: December 13, 2022; Label: Oui Entertainment, Kakao Entertainment; Formats: CD, digital download, streaming
Love2You	Released: August 30, 2024; Label: Oui Entertainment, Kakao Entertainment; Formats: digital download, streaming

=== Singles ===
List of singles, showing year released, selected chart positions, and name of the album
Title	Year	Peak position	Album
Title	Year	KOR Down.	Album
Korean
"Twilight"	2020	18	Identity: First Sight
"All or Nothing" (모 아님 도)	2021	127	Identity: Challenge
"Bye Bye Bye"	2021	27	Identity: Action
"Starry Night" (Prod. Dress) (반 고흐의 밤) (Note: "Starry Night (Prod. Dress)" was released as a promotional single in collaboration with Universe.)	2021	—	Non-album single
"Too Bad"	2022	76	Love Pt.1: First Love
"Spray"	2022	147	Love Pt.2: Passion
"Gift for You"	2022	—	Gift for You
"Overdrive" (질주)	2023	42	Love Pt.3: Eternally
"Love2You"	2024	—	Non-album single
"Not Enough"	2025	77	The Feelings
"Home"	2025	127	Wonderland
"Save"	2026	—	Non-album single
Japanese
"Maldives"	2022	—	Youth
"Fake Love" (偽物)	2024	—	Wave
English
"Overdrive (English Ver.)"	2023	—	Non-album single
"—" denotes a recording that did not chart or was not released in that territory

== Videography ==
=== Music videos ===
Title	Year	Director(s)	Ref.
Korean
"Twilight"	2020	Hong Wonki, HYEYA (Zanybros)	
"All or Nothing" (모 아님 도) (Prod. Jang Daehyeon)	2021	Hong Wonki (Zanybros)	
"Bye Bye Bye"	2021	Lee Gi-baek (Tiger Cave Studio)	
"Starry Night" (반 고흐의 밤) (Prod. Dress)	2021	kinotaku	
"Too Bad"	2022	Ha Junghoon (SUSHIVISUAL)	
"Spray"	2022	HEADHEAD	
"Overdrive" (질주)	2023	Kim Joo Sun (Apple-Juice)	
Japanese
"Maldives"	2022	Kim Joo Sun (Apple-Juice)	

== Filmography ==
=== Web show ===
Year	Title	Notes	Ref.
2020–present	Oui Go Up	3 seasons	

== Concerts and tours ==
=== Headlining tour ===
- WEi World Tour [First Love] (2022)
- WEi 2nd World Tour [Passion] (2023)

=== Concert ===
Title	Date	Venue	Network
2022 WEi Concert [First Love]	April 16, 2022	KBS Arena	KAVECON
2022 WEi Concert [First Love]	April 17, 2022	KBS Arena	KAVECON
WEi Fan Concert [Merry RUi Day]	December 10, 2022	YES24 LIVE HALL	KAVECON; STAYG
WEi Fan Concert [Merry RUi Day]	December 11, 2022	YES24 LIVE HALL	KAVECON; STAYG
WEi Showcase Concert [Eternal Sunshine]	June 28, 2023	YES24 LIVE HALL	KAVECON; STAYG
2024 WEi Japan Concert [THE WAVE]	February 17, 2024	Matsushita IMP Hall	
2024 WEi Japan Concert [THE WAVE]	February 25, 2024	JAPAN PAVILION Hall A	
WEi Showcase Concert [The Feelings]	January 15, 2025	YES24 WANDERLOCH HALL	
2025 WEi Japan Concert [The Feelings]	February 8, 2025	SAKURA TOWN JAPAN PAVILION Hall A	
2025 WEi Fan Concert [The Feelings] in TAIPEI	February 15, 2025	CORNER MAX	
2025 WEi Fan Concert [The Feelings] in TAIPEI	February 16, 2025	CORNER MAX	
WEi Showcase Concert [Wonderland]	October 29, 2025	YES24 LIVE HALL	
2025 WEi Japan Concert [Wonderland]	November 22, 2025	SKY THEATER MBS	
2025 WEi Japan Concert [Wonderland]	November 30, 2025	SAKURA TOWN JAPAN PAVILION HALL A	

== Awards and nominations ==
Name of the award ceremony, year presented, category, nominee of the award, and the result of the nomination
Award ceremony	Year	Category	Nominee(s)/work(s)	Result	Ref.
APAN Music Awards	2020	APAN Choice New K-Pop Icon	WEi	Won	
Asia Artist Awards	2021	Male Idol Group Popularity Award	WEi	Nominated	
Asia Artist Awards	2021	U+ Idol Live Popularity Award	WEi	Nominated	
Brand Customer Loyalty Awards	2021	Best Male Rookie Award	WEi	Nominated	
Brand of the Year Awards	2021	Rookie Male Idol Award	WEi	Nominated	
Gaon Chart Music Awards	2021	New Artist of the Year - Physical	Identity : First Sight	Nominated	
Global Environment International Conference Awards	2022	Top Class Representative Person Award	WEi	Won	
Golden Disc Awards	2021	Rookie Artist of the Year	WEi	Nominated	
Hanteo Music Awards	2022	Emerging Artist	WEi	Won	
Korea First Brand Awards	2021	New Male Artist Award	WEi	Nominated	
Korea First Brand Awards	2022	Male Idol Rising Star Award	WEi	Nominated	
Korea First Brand Awards	2023	Male Idol Rising Star Award	WEi	Won	
Mnet Asian Music Awards	2020	Best New Male Artist	WEi	Nominated	
Mnet Asian Music Awards	2020	Artist of the Year	WEi	Nominated	
Mnet Asian Music Awards	2020	Worldwide Icon of the Year	WEi	Nominated	
MTV Europe Music Awards	2021	Best Korean Act	WEi	Nominated	
Seoul Music Awards	2021	Rookie of the Year	WEi	Nominated	
Seoul Music Awards	2021	K-wave Popularity Award	WEi	Nominated	
Seoul Music Awards	2021	Popularity Award	WEi	Nominated	
