= Produce 101 – Final =

EP by Produce 101 contestants
- Released: June 17, 2017
- Language: Korean
- Label: CJ E&M

Produce 101 – Final is an EP by contestants of the South Korean survival show Produce 101 Season 2. It was released online for download on June 17, 2017, by CJ E&M.

== Track listing ==
No.	Title	Length
1.	"Hands on Me"	4:11
2.	"Super Hot"	3:57
3.	"이 자리에" (Always)	4:01

== Sales ==
Title	Peak positions	Sales
"Hands on Me"	11	KOR: 201,738+
"Super Hot"	19	KOR: 162,786+
"Always" (이 자리에)	17	KOR: 175,951+
