= Love Pt. 1: First Love =

- Digital cover

EP by WEi
- Released: March 16, 2022
- Recorded: 2022
- Length: 20:51
- Language: Korean
- Label: Oui Entertainment; Kakao Entertainment

WEi chronology
Identity: Action (2021)	Love Pt. 1: First Love (2022)	Youth (2022)

Singles from Love Pt. 1: First Love
- 1. "Too Bad" Released: March 16, 2022

Love Pt. 1: First Love is the fourth extended play by South Korean boy group WEi. It was released by Oui Entertainment on March 16, 2022 and contains six tracks, including the lead single "Too Bad".

== Background and release ==
On February 28, 2022, it was announced the group would release their fourth extended play Love Pt. 1: First Love on June 9. On March 3, the track list was released, with "Too Bad" announced as the lead single. On March 11, the highlight medley video was released. Music video teasers for the lead single were released on March 8 and March 14, respectively.

== Composition ==
Love Pt. 1: First Love consists of six tracks and is described as telling the story of young people experiencing the clumsiness of first love while also marking the start of the group's Love trilogy. The opening track "Blossom" is a British rock genre with a trendy combination of electronic sounds and drums that compares the fluttering feelings of first love to flowers blooming. The lead single "Too Bad" is a described as a song with an addictive hook melody added over an attractive bass and exciting guitar riff that expresses the message of a fresh and shy confession of first love. The third track "Super Bumpy" is a sophisticated hip-hop beat and powerful synth that contains the feelings of a love that becomes stronger due to repeated difficulties and misunderstandings. The fourth track "Know Ya'" is described as a sexy and attractive alternative R&B-based pop house dance song that expresses the feelings of falling in love with each other more deeply. The fifth track "Bad Night" is described as a refreshing sound of stronger love and faith while using vintage acoustics. The sixth track "Bouquet" is an emotional ballad that expresses becoming a bouquet for the person you love.

== Promotion ==
Following the release of Love Pt. 1: First Love, WEi held a showcase on the same date to introduce the extended play and communicate with their fans. The group performed "Too Bad", "Super Bumpy", and "Bad Night" during the showcase. The group's promotions for the song "Too Bad" began on March 17, 2022, on Mnet's M Countdown. The B-side track "Super Bumpy'" was also performed during the group's promotions. A special music video featuring "Blossom" was released on April 4.

== Track listing ==
Love Pt. 1: First Love track listing
No.	Title	Lyrics	Music	Arrangement	Length
1.	"Blossom" (피어나)	Jang Dae-hyeon; RYVNG (Stupid Squad); Maynine (Stupid Squad)	Jang Dae-hyeon; RYVNG (Stupid Squad); Maynine (Stupid Squad)	Jang Dae-hyeon; Stupid Squad (RYVNG, Maynine, Oh Hyung Seok)	3:24
2.	"Too Bad"	Kim Min Goo; Kim Seung Soo; Jang Dae-hyeon	Kim Min Goo; Kim Seung Soo; Lee Dae Hee	Kim Min Goo; Kim Seung Soo	3:17
3.	"Super Bumpy"	MosPick; Young Chance; gxxdkelvin	MosPick; Young Chance; gxxdkelvin	MosPick	3:27
4.	"Know Ya"	Seo Ji Eun; Dante; Moon Kim	Moon Kim	Seo Ji Eun; Dante	3:23
5.	"Bad Night"	HOFF; KZ	KZ; Kim Tae Young; HOFF	KZ; Kim Tae Young	3:15
6.	"Bouquet" (꽃다발)	$ÜN; Lee Yu Mi; rudbeckia	STAINBOYS; $ÜN; Park Ji Eun	STAINBOYS; Park Ji Eun)	4:05
Total length:					20:51

== Charts ==
=== Weekly charts ===
Weekly chart performance for Love Pt. 1: First Love
Chart (2022)	Peak position
South Korean Albums (Gaon)	5
Japan Albums (Oricon)	39

=== Monthly charts ===
Monthly chart performance for Love Pt. 1: First Love
Chart (2022)	Peak position
South Korean Albums (Gaon)	12

== Release history ==
Region	Date	Format	Label
Various	March 16, 2022	CD	Oui Entertainment; Kakao Entertainment
Various	March 16, 2022	Digital download; streaming	Oui Entertainment; Kakao Entertainment
