= Feeling (disambiguation) =

Feeling is a conscious subjective experience of emotion.

The Feeling or Feeling may also refer to:

- The Feeling, an English rock band
  - The Feeling (album), 2016
- "The Feeling" (song), a song by DJ Fresh from the album Nextlevelism
- "The Feeling", a song by Kutless from the album To Know That You're Alive
- "The Feeling", a song by Justin Bieber from his album Purpose
- "The Feeling", a song by Joe Satriani from the album Flying in a Blue Dream
- "The Feeling", a song by Michael Fall from the 2013 album Turn on your radio
- "Feeling" (Ladipoe and Buju song), 2021
- "Feeling" (Yōko Oginome and Masatoshi Ono song), 1999
- "Feeling" (Elodie and Tiziano Ferro song), 2024
- Ehsaas: The Feeling, a 2001 Indian film by Mahesh Manjrekar

== See also ==
- Feelings (disambiguation)
- Feelin's (disambiguation)
