= Hard Feelings =

Hard Feelings may refer to:

== Music ==
=== Albums ===
- Hard Feelings (album), by Blessthefall, 2018
- Hard Feelings, by Julie Bergan, 2020
- Hard Feelings, by Major League, 2012

=== Songs ===
- "Hard Feelings/Loveless", by Lorde, 2017
- "Hard Feelings", by Fleetwood Mac from Behind the Mask, 1990
- "Hard Feelings", by Gucci Mane from Evil Genius, 2018
- "Hard Feelings", by Miquela, 2020
- "Hard Feelings", by Poppy from Am I a Girl?, 2018

== Other uses ==
- Hard Feelings (film), a 1982 Canadian drama film
- Hard Feelings, a 1982 play by Doug Lucie

== See also ==
- No Hard Feelings (disambiguation)
- Feelings (disambiguation)
