= Feelin' You =

Feelin' You may refer to:

- "Feelin' You" (Solange Knowles song)
- "Feelin' You" (Bright song)
- "Feelin' You", non-album single by 3LW

== See also ==
- "Munch (Feelin' U)", a 2022 song by Ice Spice
- "Feelin' U", a 2003 song by Shy FX
