= Feeling Myself =

Feeling Myself or Feelin' Myself may refer to:

- "Feeling Myself" (Nicki Minaj song), a 2014 song by Nicki Minaj
- "Feeling Myself", a song by Pusha T from Fear of God II: Let Us Pray, 2011
- "Feeling Myself", a song by Wolf Alice from Blue Weekend, 2021
- "Feelin' Myself" (Nipsey Hussle song), 2010
- "Feelin' Myself" (will.i.am song)", 2013
