= Feeling Alright (disambiguation) =

"Feelin' Alright?" is a 1968 song by Traffic, made famous by a 1969 version by Joe Cocker retitled "Feeling Alright".

Feeling Alright may also refer to:

- "Feelin' Alright" (Len song), 1999 song by Canadian alternative rock group Len
- Feelin' All Right, 1981 album by the New Riders of the Purple Sage
- Feeling Alright, an album by Masterboy
- "Feeling Alright", a song by Rebelution from the album Courage to Grow
- "Feeling Alright", a song by Kaiser Chiefs from the album Kaiser Chiefs' Easy Eighth Album
