= No Hard Feelings =

No Hard Feelings may refer to:

== Film and television ==
- No Hard Feelings (2020 film), a German drama film about a gay German man of Iranian descent
- No Hard Feelings (2023 film), a 2023 American sex comedy film starring Jennifer Lawrence
- No Hard Feelings (Alias), an episode of the TV series Alias

== Music ==
- No Hard Feelings (Dreezy album), 2016
- No Hard Feelings (The Beaches album), 2025
- No Hard Feelings (EP), an EP by Leigh-Anne
- No Hard Feelings, an EP by the Chainsmokers
- "No Hard Feelings" (song), a song by Old Dominion on the album Time, Tequila & Therapy
- "No Hard Feelings", a song by the Avett Brothers on the album True Sadness
- "No Hard Feelings", a song by Billy Woods on the album Aethiopes (2022)
- "No Hard Feelings", a song by the Bloodhound Gang on the album Hefty Fine
- "No Hard Feelings", a song by Saliva on the album Survival of the Sickest
- "No Hard Feelings", a song by Wolf Alice on the album Blue Weekend

== See also ==
- Hard Feelings (disambiguation)
