= Feelin' It =

Feelin' It or Feeling It may refer to:

== Music ==
=== Albums ===
- Feelin' It (album) by Jimmy McGriff, 2011

=== Songs ===
- "Feelin' It" (Jay-Z song)
- "Feelin' It" (Scotty McCreery song), 2014
- "Feelin' It", a song by Chuck Berry and the Steve Miller Band from the album Live at the Fillmore Auditorium, 1967
