= Rainz =

2017–2018 South Korean boy band

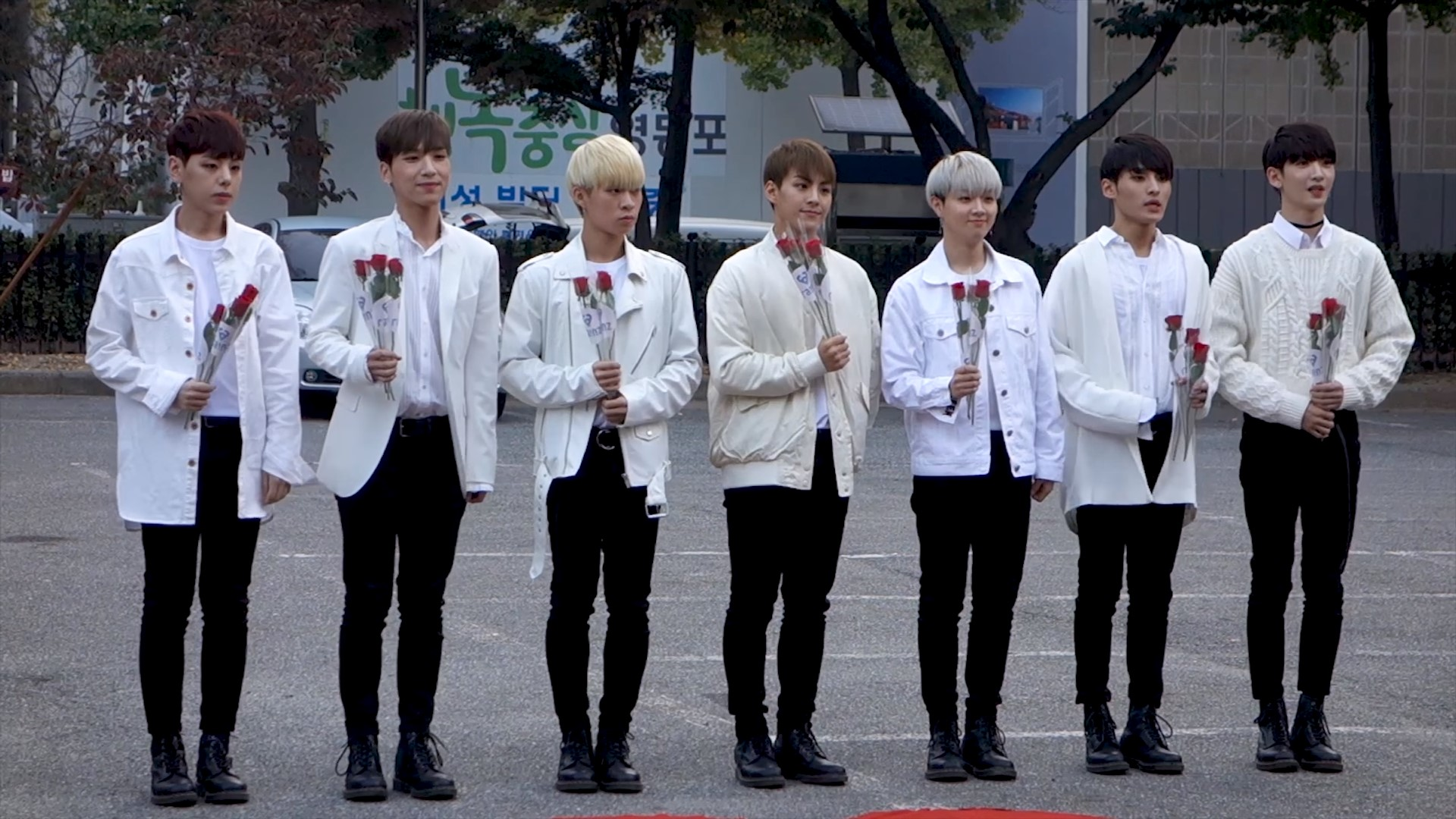

Background information
- Origin: Seoul, South Korea
- Genres: K-pop
- Years active: 2017–2018
- Labels: Kiss Entertainment
- Past members: Kim Seong-ri; Ju Won-tak; Lee Ki-won; Jang Dae-hyeon; Hong Eun-ki; Byun Hyun-min; Seo Sung-hyuk
- Website: rainz.co.kr

Rainz (Korean: 레인즈) was a South Korean boy band consisting of seven members who previously participated in Mnet's 2017 survival show Produce 101 Season 2. They debuted on October 12, 2017, with Sunshine. They officially disbanded after concluding their last group activities in Japan on October 28, 2018, and returned to their respective agencies.

== Members ==
- Kim Seong-ri (김성리)
- Ju Won-tak (주원탁)
- Lee Ki-won (이기원)
- Jang Dae-hyeon (장대현)
- Hong Eun-ki (홍은기)
- Byun Hyun-min (변현민)
- Seo Sung-hyuk (서성혁)

== Discography ==
=== Extended plays ===
Title	Album details	Peak chart positions	Sales
Title	Album details	KOR	Sales
Sunshine	Released: October 12, 2017; Label: Kiss Entertainment, Genie Music; Formats: CD, digital download, streaming; Track listing: 1. Juliette; 2. All Night Kinda Night; 3. Dilemma; 4. Rainy Day (톡톡)	9	KOR: 28,657+; JPN: 2,353+
Shake You Up	Released: January 23, 2018; Label: Kiss Entertainment, Genie Music; Formats: CD, digital download, streaming; Track listing: 1. Turn It Up; 2. Music Up; 3. Open Ur Heart; 4. Somebody; 5. Turn It Up (inst.)	5	KOR: 17,665; JPN: 4,454

=== Singles ===
Title	Year	Peak chart positions			Sales (Note: Korean-language singles are digital downloads while Japanese-language singles are physical units, except noted.)	Album
Title	Year	KOR	JPN	JPN Hot	Sales	Album
Korean
"Juliette"	2017	—	—	—	Undisclosed	Sunshine
"Music Up"	2018	—	—	—	Undisclosed	Shake You Up
"Turn It Up"	2018	—	—	—	Undisclosed	Shake You Up
Japanese
"Good" (好きなんて)	2018	—	9	16	JPN: 16,141	Non-album single
"Rainbow" (虹)	2018	—	3	8	JPN: 27,046	Non-album single
"—" denotes releases that did not chart.

=== Soundtrack appearances ===
Year	Title	Drama
2017	"Let It Go, Let It Be"	Hospital Ship OST
