= Kim Yo-han =

South Korean singer and actor (born 1999)

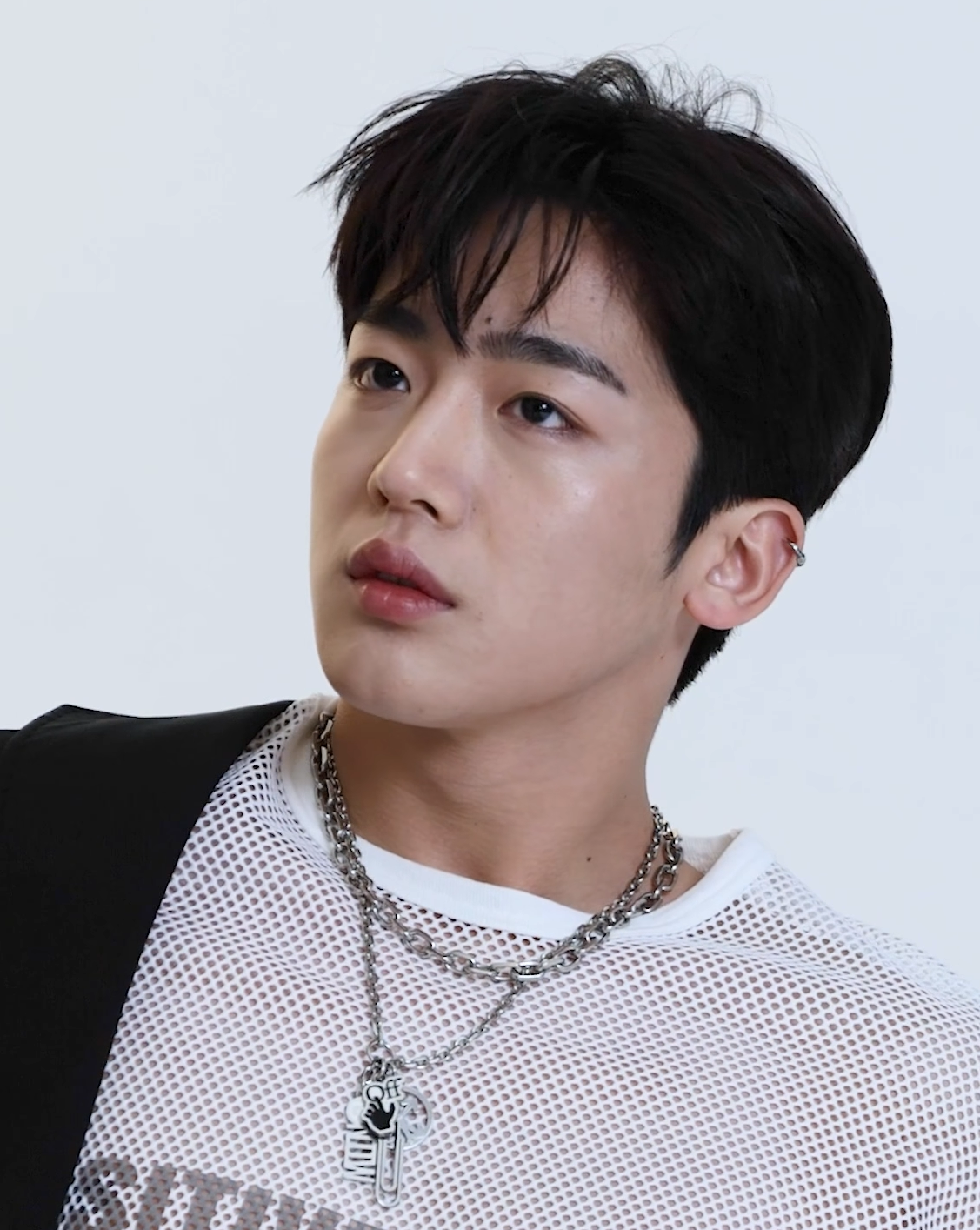
- Kim in March 2022
- Born: September 22, 1999 (age 27); Seoul, South Korea
- Education: Sangmyung University
- Occupations: Singer; actor
- Musical career
- Genre: K-pop
- Instrument: Vocals
- Years active: 2019–present
- Labels: Oui; Swing
- Member of: WEi
- Formerly of: X1
- Website: ouient.com/47

Korean name
- Hangul: 김요한
- RR: Gim Yohan
- MR: Kim Yohan

Kim Yo-han (Korean: 김요한, born September 22, 1999), also known by the mononym Yohan (요한), is a South Korean singer and actor. He is a member of the boy group WEi and a former member of boy group X1, finishing first on Produce X 101. He made his solo debut with the digital single "No More" on August 25, 2020. He made his acting debut in the romantic comedy A Love So Beautiful.

== Early life ==
Kim was born on September 22, 1999, in Jungnang District, Seoul, South Korea. He has two younger sisters. Prior to his debut, Kim was a national taekwondo athlete. He was a two-time champion at the National Youth Sports Festival.

== Career ==
=== 2019: Produce X 101 and X1 ===
In May 2019, Kim participated in the Mnet reality-survival program Produce X 101 despite having only three months of training. The original intention of the show was for the eleven winners of the program to form a boy group that would promote for 5 years under Swing Entertainment. Kim finished first in the competition, and debuted as a member and center of X1 on August 27, 2019, with its debut showcase held at Gocheok Sky Dome. However, X1 would later disband on January 6, 2020, due to allegations of vote-rigging in the show. On November 5, 2019, Ahn Joon-young, the producer of Produce X 101, was arrested, and he later admitted to manipulating the vote rankings.

=== 2020: Solo career and debut with WEi ===
Kim was in the talks to join the School series, School 2020. It was later confirmed in February 2020, with the show slated to air in August 2020. In April 2020, it was reported that the series had been cancelled by KBS due to casting controversy over the female lead role. On June 17, 2020, Oui Entertainment announced that they will be debuting a new boy group, tentatively called "OUIBOYZ", in the second half of the year. Kim is expected to be a part of this group, alongside label mates Kim Dong-han, Jang Dae-hyeon, and Kang Seok-hwa. On July 10, 2020, Oui Entertainment launched social media accounts for their new boy group called "WEi" which Kim has been confirmed to be a member of. They also released an image film for the logo. Kim was also announced as an MC for the first day of the 26th Dream Concert "CONNECT:D". On August 6, 2020, it was announced that Kim would be releasing a solo song, in the form of a digital single, on August 25, 2020, ahead of his future debut with WEi, titled "No More", produced by Zion. T. On October 5, 2020, Kim debuted with WEi with the mini album Identity: First Sight, with the title track "Twilight".

He also starred as the main lead in the K-drama "A Love So Beautiful", which is the remake of the C-drama of the same name, marking his acting debut. He also contributed to the OST by making a soundtrack appearance in "Recently", which was released on January 11, 2021.

=== 2021–present: Solo activities ===
On March 2, 2021, Kim became one of the hosts for SBS MTV's music program The Show alongside Ateez's Yeosang and Weeekly's Jihan. In 2021, Kim joins the cast of variety show Chick High Kick along with HaHa and Na Tae-joo. Later, Kim will be confirmed to join the KBS drama School 2021 with Jo Yi-hyun.

On January 10, 2022, Kim released his first solo mini album Illusion, with the title track "Dessert". In February 2022, Vanity Teen editor Aedan Juvet revealed Kim's debut magazine cover, making him the magazine's first K-pop artist to receive a digital cover feature.

On February 23, 2023, Kim released "Let's Love" with Chuu, which is part of Project Restless.

== Discography ==
=== Extended plays ===
Title	Details	Peak chart positions	Sales
Title	Details	KOR	Sales
Illusion	Released: January 10, 2022; Label: Oui Entertainment; Formats: CD, digital download, streaming	3	KOR: 55,194

=== Singles ===
==== As lead artist ====
Title	Year	Peak position	Album
Title	Year	KOR Down.	Album
"No More"	2020	8	Non-album single
"Dessert"	2022	9	Illusion
"Blue in You" (with CHEEZE)	2023	—	Non-album single
"—" denotes releases that did not chart or were not released in that region.

==== Promotional singles ====
Title	Year	Album
"I Believe" (with Bae Jin-young)	2020	Non-album singles
"World is One 2021" (with Chuu, Eric Bellinger)	2021	Non-album singles
"Let's Love" (with Chuu)	2023	Project Restless

=== Soundtrack appearances ===
Title	Year	Peak position	Album
Title	Year	KOR	Album
"Recently" (요즘 자꾸만)	2021	— (Note: "Recently" did not enter the Gaon Digital Chart, but peaked at number 12 and 147 on the Gaon Download Chart and Gaon BGM Chart, respectively.)	A Love So Beautiful OST
"My Destiny" (우연처럼)	2022	— (Note: "My Destiny" did not enter the Circle Digital Chart, but peaked at number 116 on the Circle BGM Chart.)	Love Catcher in Bali OST Part 3
"—" denotes releases that did not chart or were not released in that region.

=== Songwriting ===
All song credits are adapted from the Korea Music Copyright Association's database, unless otherwise noted.

Year	Song	Artist(s)	Album	Lyrics	
Year	Song	Artist(s)	Album	Credited	With
2020	"No More"	Himself	Non-album single	Yes	Zion.T, TAEO
2020	"DOREMIFA"	WEi	Identity: First Sight	Yes	Jo Yuri (Jam Factory), Jang Dae-hyeon
2021	"Bye Bye Bye"	WEi	Identity: Action	Yes	MosPick, Jang Dae-hyeon, Yoo Yong-ha
2021	"Ocean"	WEi	Identity: Action	Yes	MosPick, Jang Dae-hyeon, Yoo Yong-ha
2022	"DESSERT"	Himself	Illusion	Yes	STAINBOYS, NU'MAKER
2022	"Landing On You"	Himself	Illusion	Yes	OUOW
2022	"SELFISH"	Himself	Illusion	Yes	Royal Dive
2022	"Bye Bye Bye (Japanese Ver.)	WEi	Youth	Yes	MosPick, Jang Dae-hyeon, Yoo Yong-ha

== Filmography ==
=== Television series ===
Year	Title	Role	Notes	Ref.
2009	Queen Seondeok	Child	Extra	
2020	Zombie Detective	Skin cream CM model	Cameo (Episode 1)	
2021	Mouse	Brain transplant patient	Cameo (Episode 20)	
2021–2022	School 2021	Gong Ki-joon		
2025	The Winning Try	Yun Seong-jun		

=== Web series ===
Year	Title	Role	Ref.
2020	A Love So Beautiful	Cha Heon	
2025	Love.exe	Kang Min-hak	

=== Television shows ===
Year	Title	Role	Notes	Ref.
2019	Produce X 101	Contestant	Finished 1st	
2020	War of Music People	Cast member		
2020–2021	The People of Trot	Deputy manager		
2021	The Show	Host	with Yeosang, Jihan	
2021	Chick High Kick	Cast member		
2021	The Greater Ocean Territory of Korea	Host	with Jung Sung-hwa	
2022	Sports Golden Bell	Contestant	Chuseok Special	
2024	League of Universities	MC		
2024	Local Cool Place	Special MC		

=== Web shows ===
Year	Title	Role	Ref.
2022	Love Catcher in Bali	Host	

=== Radio shows ===
Year	Title	Role	Notes	Ref.
2022	Idol Radio	Temporary DJ	Season 2	

== Awards and nominations ==
Name of the award ceremony, year presented, category, nominee of the award, and the result of the nomination
Award ceremony	Year	Category	Nominee / Work	Result	Ref.
Blue Dragon Series Awards	2023	Best New Male Entertainer	Love Catcher in Bali	Nominated	
KBS Drama Awards	2021	Best New Actor	School 2021	Won	
KBS Drama Awards	2021	Best Couple Award	Kim Yo-han (with Cho Yi-hyun); School 2021	Won	
SBS Drama Awards	2025	Excellence Award, Actor in a Miniseries Humanity/Fantasy Drama	The Winning Try	Won	
