= Oui Entertainment =

South Korean entertainment company

- Native name: 위 엔터테인먼트
- Type: Private
- Industry: Music; Entertainment
- Genre: K-pop; Dance; R&B; Electropop
- Founded: June 26, 2017; 9 years ago
- Founder: Wee Myung-hee
- Headquarters: Jandari-ro 108 B1, Seogyo-dong, Mapo-gu, Seoul, South Korea
- Services: Music Production; Artists Management
- Website: ouient.com

Oui Entertainment (Korean: 위 엔터테인먼트) is a South Korean entertainment agency founded in 2017 by Wee Myung-hee. The label is home to artists such as its artists include WEi, Kim Dong-han, Jang Dae-hyeon and Kim Yo-han, Kim Jun-seo and also manages the actress Kim I-on.

== History ==
Founder Wee Myeong-hee has built a career in management and production in Shinchon Music, Pan Entertainment, and GnG Production, and served as a director of the Korean Entertainment Producers Association. After working at Pan Entertainment, she used her family name to create an agency with a name similar to it to produce Park Seon-ju's 4th album. As she moved to GnG Production as a producer, the operation was suspended for a while and then resumed operation in 2017.

On April 7, 2017, Kim Dong-han and Jang Dae-hyeon participated in the Mnet's survival variety show Produce 101 season 2, in which they ranked in the 29th and 83rd place. After the show, they respectively debuted in JBJ and RAINZ. After the disbandment of both groups, they started their solo careers.

On November 3, 2018, trainees Yoo Yong-ha and Kim Jun-seo took part in MBC TV's variety show Under Nineteen, through which they ended up being in the final lineup and they officially debuted in 1THE9 on April 13, 2019, After 17 months of activities, they disbanded in August 2020.

From May to July 2019, Kim Yo-han participated in the Mnet's survival variety show Produce X 101 and finished in first place. He made his official debut in X1 on August 27. The group was supposed to last for 5 years, but they disbanded on January 6, 2020 due to the Mnet voting manipulation scandal. He officially started his solo career on August 25, 2020.

In May 2020, Oui announced their first new boy group under the temporary name OUIBOYS. The group's name was later announced to be WEi and they debuted in October 2020.

In the end of 2021, it was announced that Oui will be managing the band CraXilver, which debuted in June 2022. In 2022, Oui announced that the group's contract with the company had ended.

== Artists ==
=== Recording artists ===
==== Groups ====
- WEi

==== Soloists ====
- Kim Dong-han
- Jang Dae-hyeon
- Kim Yo-han

=== Actors/actresses ===
- Choi Seung-hoon
- Kim Dong-han
- Kim I-on
- Kim Yo-han
- Nam Dan-woo
- Yoon Ga-I
- Kim Jun-seo

== Former artists ==
- Jo Sung-wook (2017–2021)
- Seol In-ah (2017–2022)
- CraXilver (2021–2022)
- Kim So-won (2022–2024)

== Discography ==
Year	Released	Title	Artist	Type
2018	June 19	D-Day	Kim Dong-han	Extended play
2018	October 17	D-Night	Kim Dong-han	Extended play
2019	May 1	D-Hours AM 7:03	Kim Dong-han	Extended play
2019	August 24	Feel Good	Jang Dae-hyeon	Single album
2020	August 25	No More	Kim Yo-han	Single
2020	October 5	Identity: First Sight	WEi	Extended play
2021	February 24	Identity: Challenge	WEi	Extended play
2021	June 9	Identity: Action	WEi	Extended play
2022	January 10	Illusion	Kim Yo-han	Extended play
2022	March 16	Love Pt.1: First Love	WEi	Extended play
2022	August 11	Youth	WEi	Japanese extended play
2022	October 19	Love Pt.2 : Passion	WEi	Extended Play
2022	December 13	Gift for You	WEi	Single album
2023	April 28	The Blue	Soopia	Single
2023	June 29	Love Pt.3 : Eternally	WEi	Extended play
2023	September 22	Blue in You (Duet With CHEEZE)	Kim Yo-han	Single
2024	February 14	Wave	WEi	Japanese extended play
2024	August 30	Love2You	WEi	Single album
