= Jang Dae-hyeon =

South Korean singer (born 1997)

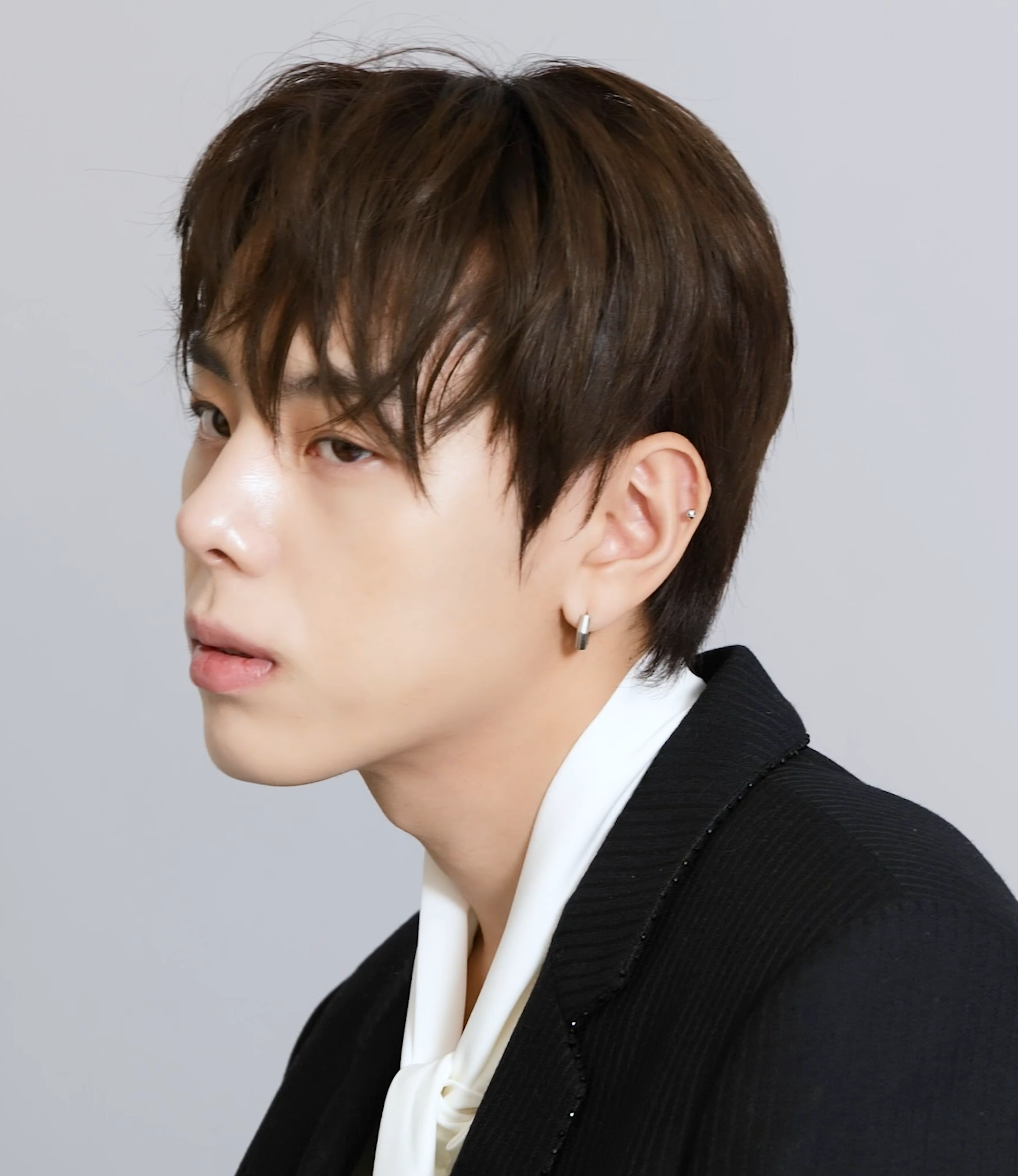
- Jang in March 2022
- Born: February 11, 1997 (age 29); Mapo District, Seoul, South Korea
- Occupations: Rapper; singer; songwriter
- Musical career
- Genres: K-pop
- Instrument: Vocals
- Years active: 2017–present
- Label: Oui
- Member of: WEi
- Formerly of: Rainz
- Website: Jang Daehyeon

Korean name
- Hangul: 장대현
- Hanja: 張大賢
- RR: Jang Daehyeon
- MR: Chang Taehyŏn

Jang Dae-hyeon (Korean: 장대현; born February 11, 1997), better known mononymously as Daehyeon, is a South Korean rapper, singer, and songwriter. He is known for his participation in the reality competition show Produce 101 Season 2. He is a former member of boy band Rainz and currently a member of South Korean boy band WEi. Jang released his debut single album Feel Good as a solo artist in August 2019.

== Career ==
=== 2017–2018: Produce 101 and Rainz ===
In April 2017, Jang participated in Mnet's reality competition show to form a temporary boy group, Produce 101 Season 2, representing Oui Entertainment with two other trainees. He was eliminated on episode 5, finishing in 83rd overall.

On August 25, 2017, Project Rainz, an association of several agencies including Oui Entertainment, confirmed that Jang would join the debut lineup of Rainz. The group debuted in October 2017 with their first extended play Sunshine. After releasing up to four EPs, they eventually disbanded on October 28, 2018.

=== 2019-present: Solo debut and WEi ===
On August 1, 2019, Oui Entertainment announced that Jang would make his debut as a solo artist with a single on August 24. After releasing some teaser photos, on August 24, Jang make his debut with the single album Feel Good which included two songs.

On June 6, 2020, Oui Entertainment confirmed that they would debut their first boy group in the second half of the year and Jang would join the lineup. On July 11, the boy group's name was revealed to be WEi. The group debuted on October 5 with their first EP, Identity: First Sight with "Twilight" as the lead single.

== Discography ==
=== Single albums ===
Title	Album details	Peak chart positions	Sales
Title	Album details	KOR	Sales
Feel Good	Released: August 24, 2019; Label: Oui, Stone Music; Format: CD, digital download, streaming; Track listing: 1. Feel Good; 2. So	56	KOR: 2,874

=== Singles ===
Title	Year	Album
"Feel Good"	2019	Feel Good

== Songwriting ==
All song credits are adapted from the Korea Music Copyright Association's database, unless otherwise noted.

Year	Song	Artist(s)	Album	Lyrics		Music		Arrangement	
Year	Song	Artist(s)	Album	Credited	With	Credited	With	Credited	With
2018	"Open Your Heart"	Rainz	Shake You Up	Yes	Oh Ye-jin, Lee Myu-jeu, Hwang Eun-bit, Byun Hyun-min	No	—N/a	No	—N/a
2019	"Feel Good"	Jang Dae-hyeon	Feel Good	Yes	—	No	—N/a	No	—N/a
2020	"Twilight"	WEi	Identity: First Sight	Yes	Hui, Flow Blow	No	—N/a	No	—N/a
2020	"Doremifa"	WEi	Identity: First Sight	Yes	Jo Yuri (Jam Factory), Kim Yo-han	No	—N/a	No	—N/a
2020	"Timeless" (꼬리별)	WEi	Identity: First Sight	Yes	OUOW, Yoo Yong-ha	No	—N/a	No	—N/a
2020	"Hug You" (안고 싶어)	WEi	Identity: First Sight	Yes	Vendors, Kim Dong-han, Kim Jun-seo	No	—N/a	No	—N/a
2020	"Fuze" (도화선)	WEi	Identity: First Sight	Yes	RYVNG (StupidSquad), Maynine (StupidSquad), Kang Seok-hwa	Yes	RYVNG (StupidSquad), Maynine (StupidSquad)	Yes	RYVNG (StupidSquad), Maynine (StupidSquad)
2021	"All or Nothing" (모 아님 도)	WEi	Identity: Challenge	Yes	RYVNG (StupidSquad), Maynine (StupidSquad), Kim Dong-han, Kang Seok-hwa	Yes	RYVNG (StupidSquad), Maynine (StupidSquad)	Yes	RYVNG (StupidSquad), Maynine (StupidSquad)
2021	"Ring Ring"	Rocket Punch	Ring Ring	No	—N/a	No	—N/a	Yes	RYVNG (StupidSquad), Maynine (StupidSquad)
2021	"Bye Bye Bye"	WEi	Identity: Action	Yes	MosPick, Yoo Yong-ha, Kim Yo-han	No	—N/a	No	—N/a
2021	"Ocean"	WEi	Identity: Action	Yes	MosPick, Yoo Yong-ha, Kim Yo-han	No	—N/a	No	—N/a
2021	"Rui" (16번째 별)	WEi	Identity: Action	Yes	Kang Seok-hwa, RYVNG (StupidSquad), Maynine (StupidSquad)	Yes	RYVNG (StupidSquad), Oh Hyeong-seok (StupidSquad), Maynine (StupidSquad)	Yes	RYVNG (StupidSquad), Oh Hyeong-seok (StupidSquad), Maynine (StupidSquad)

== Filmography ==
=== Television shows ===
Year	Title	Network	Role	Notes	Ref.
2017	Produce 101 Season 2	Mnet	Contestant	Finished at 83rd place	
