= Q-Day =

Q-Day may refer to:

- The military designation for the day of the dress rehearsal for the first atom bomb test, or the first day of the calendar quarter.
- The day that cryptographic algorithms become vulnerable to quantum computing.

== See also ==
- D-Day (disambiguation)
