= D-Day (disambiguation) =

D-Day was the day of the Normandy landings on 6 June 1944.

D-Day or D-day may also refer to:

== Designation of days ==
- D-Day (military term), the day on which a combat attack or operation is to be initiated
  - Economic D-Day, a term used by US President Donald Trump and Treasury Secretary Scott Bessent in August 2026 for a campaign of sanctions and economic isolation against Iran during the 2026 Iran war
- Decimal Day, the day when the United Kingdom and Ireland decimalised the pound

== Film and television ==
- Roommates (2006 South Korean film), or D-Day, a horror film
- D-Day (2013 film), an Indian Hindi-language action thriller film
- D-Day (TV series), a 2015 South Korean television series

== Gaming ==
- D-Day (board game), 1961
- D-Day (1984 video game)
- D-Day (ZX Spectrum video game)
- D-Day (2004 video game)
- Axis & Allies: D-Day, a 2004 strategy board-game
- Brothers in Arms: D-Day, a 2006 first-person shooter video game
- Dino D-Day, a 2011 multiplayer game with dinosaurs added to the war

== Literature ==
- D-Day: The Battle for Normandy, a 2009 non-fiction book by Antony Beevor
- "D-Day", a 1995 poem by Pól Ó Muiri
- Jour J (comics), a French comic book series

== Music ==
- D-Day (album), by Agust D, 2023
- D-Day (D-Lite EP), 2017
- D-Day (Kim Dong-han EP), 2018
- D-Day (song), a song by Agust D,
- "D-Day", a 1993 song by duo D-Day, of TommyD and Roger Sanchez
- "D-Days", a 1981 song by Hazel O'Connor
- "D-Day", a song by Blondie from the 2011 album Panic of Girls
- "D-Day", a song by King Gizzard & the Lizard Wizard from the 2017 album Sketches of Brunswick East
- D-Day: A Gangsta Grillz Mixtape, a 2022 compilation album by Dreamville

== See also ==
- Oklahoma D-Day, a scenario game of paintball
- D-Day Dodgers, Allied servicemen who fought in Italy during the Second World War, and a popular wartime song
- D-Day Daily Telegraph crossword security alarm
