= Chaos communications =

Chaos communications is an application of chaos theory which is aimed to provide security in the transmission of information performed through telecommunications technologies. For secure communications, one has to understand that the contents of the message transmitted are inaccessible to possible eavesdroppers.

In chaos communications security (i.e., privacy) is based on the complex dynamic behaviors provided by chaotic systems. Some properties of chaotic dynamics, such as complex behaviour, noise-like dynamics (pseudorandom noise) and spread spectrum, are used to encode data. On the other hand, chaos being a deterministic phenomenon, it is possible to decode data using this determinism. In practice, implementations of chaos communications devices resort to one of two chaotic phenomena: synchronization of chaos, or control of chaos.

To implement chaos communications using such properties of chaos, two chaotic oscillators are required a transmitter and receiver. At the transmitter, a message is added onto a chaotic signal and then, the message is masked in the chaotic signal. As it carries the information, the chaotic signal is also called chaotic carrier.

Synchronizing these oscillators is similar to synchronizing random neural nets in neural cryptography.

When chaos synchronization is used, a basic scheme of a communications device is made by two identical chaotic oscillators. One of them is used as the transmitter, and the other as the receiver. They are connected in a configuration where the transmitter drives the receiver in such a way that identical synchronization of chaos between the two oscillators is achieved. For the purpose of transmission of information, at the transmitter, a message is added as a small perturbation to the chaotic signal that drives the receiver. In this way, the message transmitted is masked by the chaotic signal. When the receiver synchronizes to the transmitter, the message is decoded by a subtraction between the signal sent by transmitter and its copy generated at the receiver by means of the synchronization of chaos mechanism. This works because, whilst the transmitter output contains the chaotic carrier plus the message, the receiver output is made only by a copy of the chaotic carrier without the message.

== Optical chaos communications ==
Optical chaos has been applied to high-speed fiber-optic networks to provide Physical layer security. In these systems, data is masked within a chaotic optical carrier—often generated by laser instabilities or spectral phase encoding—making the transmission indistinguishable from background noise to unauthorized observers.

Unlike lower-speed "chaos synchronization" experiments from the 1990s, modern implementations have demonstrated 100 Gbit/s coherent transmission over commercial fiber distances (e.g., 200 km) using standard DWDM infrastructure. Security analysis suggests that because the signal is buried under the noise floor (negative OSNR), it forces attackers to possess the exact optical key in real-time to recover any data, providing resilience against "Harvest now, decrypt later" attacks.
