= Kim Dong-han =

South Korean entertainer (born 1998)

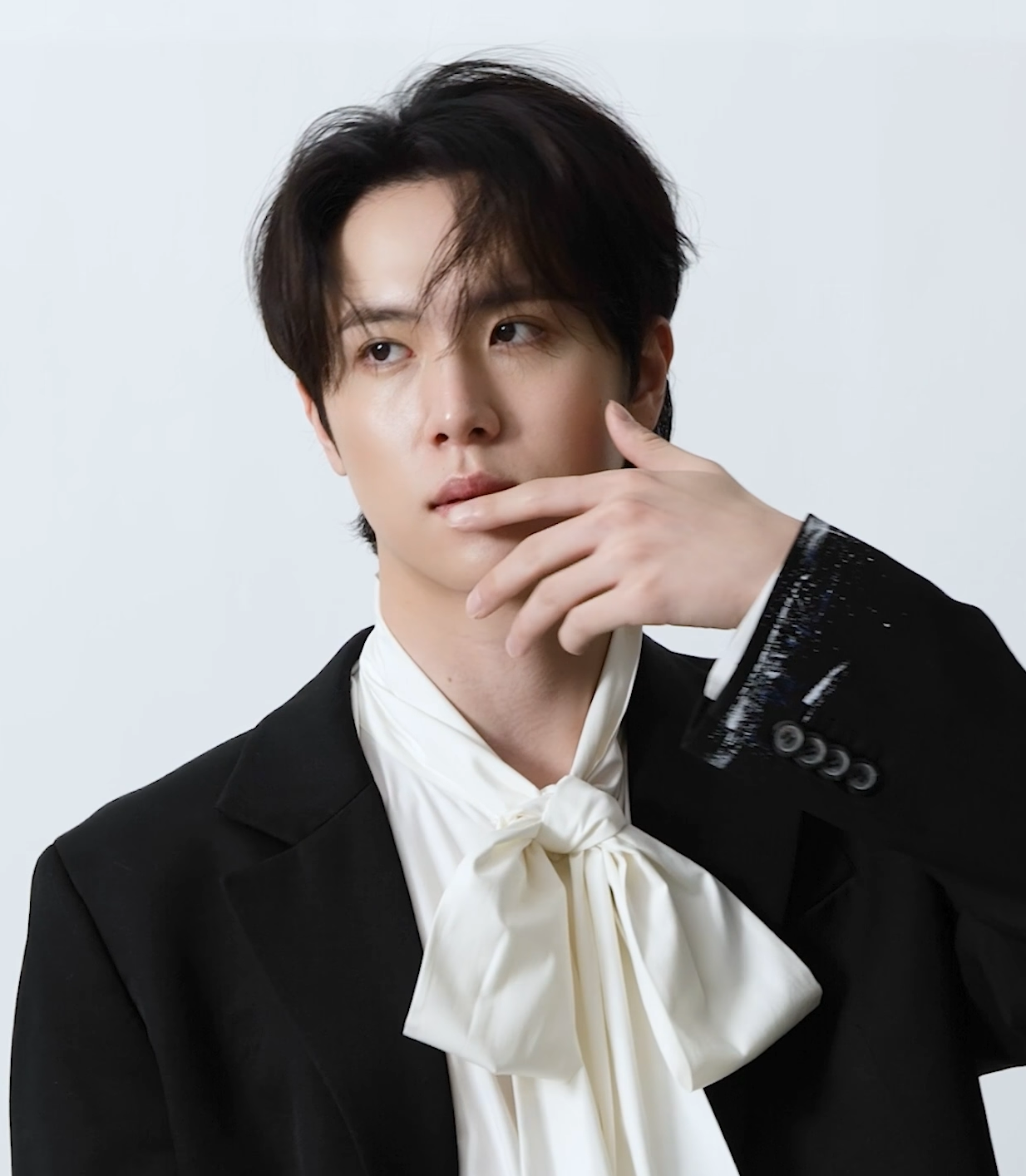
- Kim in March 2022
- Born: July 3, 1998 (age 28); Dalseo District, Daegu, South Korea
- Occupations: Singer; actor; songwriter
- Musical career
- Genres: K-pop; Alt hip hop; R&B
- Instrument: Vocals
- Years active: 2017–present
- Label: Oui
- Member of: WEi
- Formerly of: JBJ
- Website: Kim Donghan

Korean name
- Hangul: 김동한
- Hanja: 金東漢
- RR: Gim Donghan
- MR: Kim Tonghan

Kim Dong-han (Korean: 김동한; born July 3, 1998), also known mononymously as Donghan, is a South Korean singer, songwriter and actor. He first became known for competing in the reality survival show Produce 101 Season 2, and later debuted in the boy band JBJ. Kim made his solo debut with the release of his EP D-Day in June 2018. He is currently a member of South Korean boy band WEi.

== Early life ==
Kim was born on July 3, 1998, and was raised in Daegu, South Korea.

== Career ==
=== 2017–2018: Produce 101 and JBJ ===
Kim first became known in mid-2017, while competing in the reality survival show Produce 101 Season 2, a show designed to form a temporary boy group of 11 members, chosen by the public. Kim was eventually eliminated, finishing in 29th place and failing to become a member of Wanna One.

On the day of the Produce 101 finale, viewers of the show voted for eliminated contestants who they'd like to see in a project group, similar to Produce 101's I.B.I. JBJ debuted in October 2017 with the release of their first extended play Fantasy. The group released two EPs and a special album during their seven-month career. Members of the group had expressed interest in extending their original contact, however the group ultimately disbanded at the end of April 2018 with the expiration of their contract.

=== 2018–2019: Solo debut with D-Day and solo activities ===
Kim made his debut as a solo artist on June 19, 2018, with the release of his first EP D-Day, and its lead single "Sunset". The EP entered the Gaon Album Chart at number five. A week after debuted, on June 26, 2018, he scored his first music show win on SBS M's The Show.

Kim's second EP, titled D-Night, was released on October 17, 2018, with the lead single "Good Night Kiss".

A year later, on May 1, 2019, Kim released his third EP D-Hours AM 7:03, with the lead single "Focus".

On August 28, 2019, Kim made an appearance on I Can See Your Voice Thailand as a special artist. The following month, on September 17, 2019, Kim became a cast member on Law of the Jungle in Sunda Islands.

=== 2020–present: Continued solo success and debut with Wei ===
On January 26, Kim debuted as a theater actor on "Iron Mask", a musical theater based on The Man in the Iron Mask movie, alongside Sandeul and his fellow JBJ groupmate, Roh Tae-hyun.

On June 25, 2020, Oui Entertainment announced that Kim will be one of the main casts for a TikTok X tvN D Story's web series, Trap, which will be aired starting on July 15, 2020. This series is also remarked his debut as an actor.

After announcing that they will be debuting a new boy group, which Kim will be part of, back on June 17, on July 10, 2020, Oui Entertainment launched social media accounts for the group, WEi (위아이). The group debuted on October 5, 2020, with their first EP, Identity: First Sight, with "Twilight" as the lead single.

On November 6, 2025, the movie Replay, which marks Kim's big screen debut, was released.

== Personal life ==
On April 10, 2020, Kim underwent a tonsillectomy after experiencing discomfort in his tonsils, even after several continuous medical treatment at the hospital. He spent the following three-to-four weeks recovering from the surgery.

== Discography ==
=== Extended plays ===
Title	Album details	Peak chart positions	Sales
Title	Album details	KOR	Sales
D-Day	Released: June 19, 2018; Label: Oui, Kakao M; Formats: CD, digital download, streaming	5	KOR: 22,041
D-Night	Released: October 17, 2018; Label: Oui, Kakao M; Formats: CD, digital download, streaming	6	KOR: 19,247
D-Hours AM 7:03	Released: May 1, 2019; Label: Oui, Stone Music; Formats: CD, digital download, streaming	6	KOR: 17,407

=== Singles ===
==== As lead artist ====
Title	Year	Album
"Sunset"	2018	D-Day
"Good Night Kiss"	2018	D-Night
"Focus"	2019	D-Hours AM 7:03

==== Other releases ====
Title	Year	Peak chart positions	Album
Title	Year	KOR	Album
Promotional
"Shake It" (with Kang Seok-hwa)	2021	—	The Playlist Part 5
Soundtrack appearances
"If You Want and Want" (원하고 원하면)	2019	— (Note: "If You Want and Want" did not enter the Gaon Digital Chart, but peaked at number 20 on the Gaon BGM chart.)	Different Dreams OST
"One Two Three"	2022	—	Miracle OST
"—" denotes releases that did not chart or were not released in that region.

== Songwriting ==
All song credits are adapted from the Korea Music Copyright Association's database, unless otherwise noted.

Year	Song	Artist(s)	Album	Lyrics		Music	
Year	Song	Artist(s)	Album	Credited	With	Credited	With
2018	"Born"	Kim Dong-han	D-Night	Yes	OBROS2, OBROS, Zomay	Yes	OBROS2, OBROS, Zomay, 5$
2018	"Call My Name"	Kim Dong-han	D-Night	Yes	Moon Hanmiru, Korangi	No	—N/a
2018	"Good Night Kiss"	Kim Dong-han	D-Night	Yes	Robin, Kim Gyeong	No	—N/a
2018	"Tipsy"	Kim Dong-han	D-Night	Yes	Kang Eun-jong	No	—N/a
2019	"Bebe"	Kim Dong-han	D-Hours AM 7:03	Yes	Marco, Bipolar Boy	No	—N/a
2019	"Focus"	Kim Dong-han	D-Hours AM 7:03	Yes	MosPick	No	—N/a
2019	"Make Me So Crazy"	Kim Dong-han	D-Hours AM 7:03	Yes	MosPick	No	—N/a
2019	"Everyday"	Kim Dong-han	D-Hours AM 7:03	Yes	Rich Jang, Dono	No	—N/a
2019	"Idea"	Kim Dong-han	D-Hours AM 7:03	Yes	B.O, KZ, Taebongi	No	—N/a
2020	"Hug You" (안고 싶어)	WEi	Identity: First Sight	Yes	Vendors, Jang Dae-hyeon, Kim Jun-seo	No	—N/a
2021	"All or Nothing" (모 아님 도)	WEi	Identity: Challenge	Yes	Jang Dae-hyeon, RYVNG (StupidSquad), Maynine (StupidSquad), Kang Seok-hwa	No	—N/a

== Filmography ==
=== Web series ===
Year	Title	Role	Ref.
2020	Trap	Hyun Woo-jin	

=== Television shows ===
Year	Title	Role	Notes	Ref.
2017	Produce 101 Season 2	Contestant		
2018	Gourmet Idols	Main host		
2019	Battle Trip	Special MC	Ep. 145–146	
2019	Beauty Room	Host		
2019	Grandma Let's Go to School	Cast member		
2019	Law of the Jungle	Cast member	Ep. 383–387	
2020	Me ON Trot	Cast member		
2020–2021	People of Trot	Vice manager	with Kim Yo-han	

=== Web shows ===
Year	Title	Role	Notes	Ref.
2017	Drunken Ramblers	MC		
2019	Beauty Time	Co-Host	Season 1	
2020	Escape Idols	Cast member	Season 2	
2021	Double Trouble	Contestant		
2022	Idol Hit Song Festival	Contestant		

=== Hosting ===
Year	Title	Notes	Ref.
2022	28th Dream Concert	MC for the red carpet event; with So-hee and Kang Seok-hwa	

== Musical theaters ==
Year	Title	Role	Notes	Ref.
2020	Iron Mask	King Louis XIV/Philippe	BBCH Hall, Kwanglim Art Center	

== Concerts ==
=== Kim Dong Han Seoul Concert "Day & Night" (2019) ===
Date	City	Country	Venue	Ref.
January 26, 2019	Seoul	South Korea	Gyedang Hall, Sangmyung Art Center	
January 27, 2019	Seoul	South Korea	Gyedang Hall, Sangmyung Art Center	

=== Kim Dong Han Concert "D-NATION" (2020) ===
Date	City	Country	Venue	Ref.
February 15, 2020	Seoul	South Korea	Centennial Hall, Yonsei University	
February 16, 2020	Seoul	South Korea	Centennial Hall, Yonsei University	

== Awards and nominations ==
Name of the award ceremony, year presented, category, nominee of the award, and the result of the nomination
Award ceremony	Year	Category	Nominee / Work	Result	Ref.
APAN Music Awards	2020	Entertainer Award (Male)	Kim Dong-han	Nominated	
Genie Music Awards	2018	Genie Music Popularity Award	Kim Dong-han	Nominated	
Genie Music Awards	2018	The Male New Artist	Kim Dong-han	Nominated	
Genie Music Awards	2018	The Top Artist	Kim Dong-han	Nominated	
Golden Disc Awards	2019	Rookie Artist of the Year	Kim Dong-han	Nominated	
Mnet Asian Music Awards	2018	Artist of the Year	Kim Dong-han	Nominated	
Mnet Asian Music Awards	2018	Best New Male Artist	Kim Dong-han	Nominated	
Seoul Music Awards	2019	Hallyu Special Award	Kim Dong-han	Nominated	
Seoul Music Awards	2019	New Artist Award	Kim Dong-han	Nominated	
Seoul Music Awards	2019	Popularity Award	Kim Dong-han	Nominated	
