= D-Night =

Kim Dong-han EP

EP by Kim Dong-han
- Released: October 17, 2018
- Recorded: September 2018
- Venues: Seoul, South Korea
- Studio: Oui Studios
- Genre: Dance
- Length: 17:09
- Language: Korean
- Label: Oui Entertainment
- Producer: Wee Myeong-hee (exec.)

Kim Dong-han chronology
D-Day (2018)	D-Night (2018)	D-Hours AM 7:03 (2019)

Singles from D-Night
- 1. "Good Night Kiss" Released: October 17, 2018

D-Night is the second extended play by the South Korean singer Kim Dong-han. It was released on October 17, 2018, by Oui Entertainment and distributed by Kakao M. Upon completing promotions for his first mini-album, D-Day, Kim immediately began working on music for a new record. He contributed to songwriting for the first time.

Following a series of photo and video teasers, D-Night and its lead single, "Good Night Kiss", were concurrently released. Kim held a showcase for the mini-album and he promoted the song by performing it on music chart programs across various television networks. D-Night peaked at number six on South Korea's national Gaon Album Chart, selling over 19,000 units domestically since its release.

== Background and recording ==
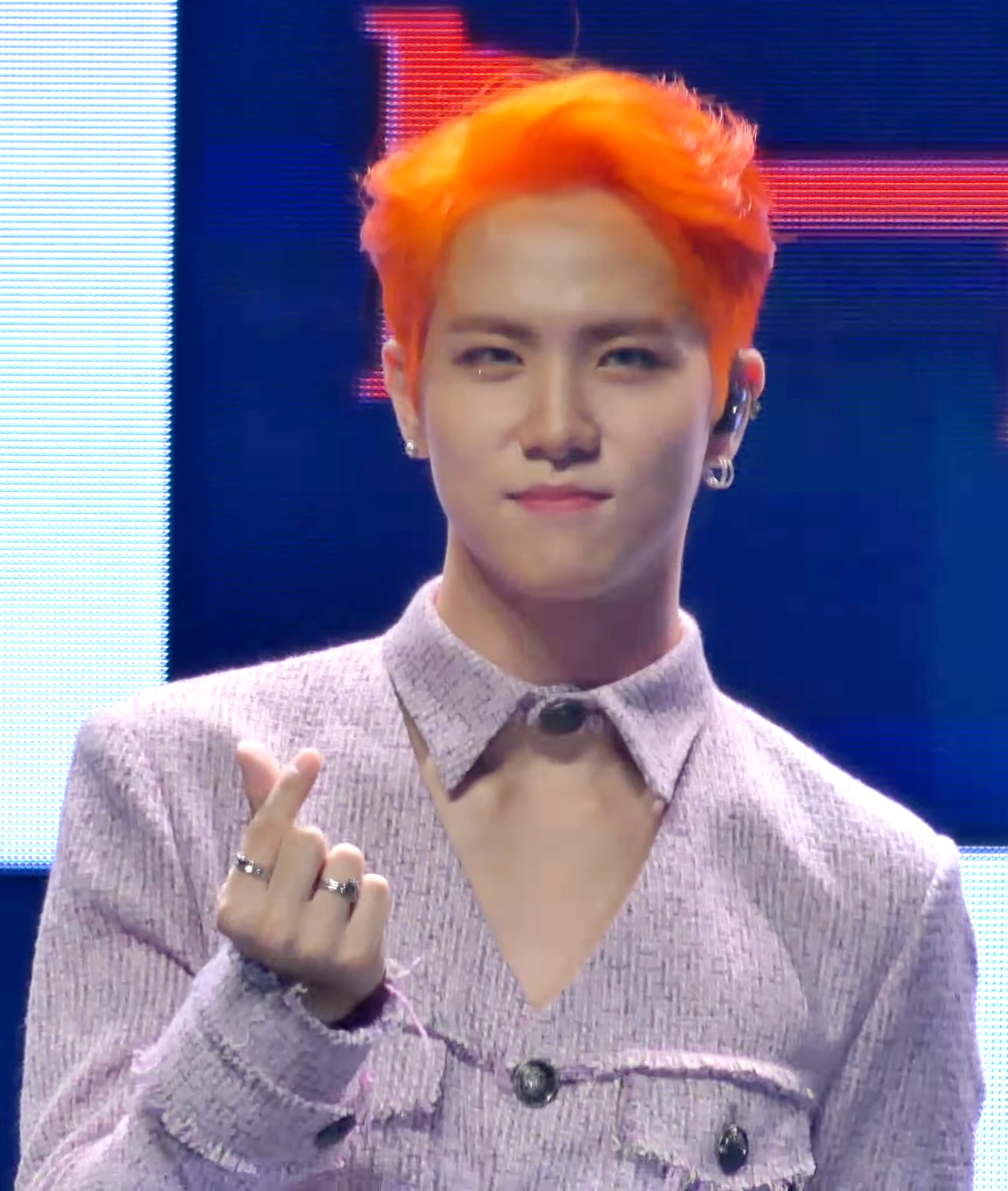
Kim dyed his hair orange to match D-Night's concept

After releasing his first solo mini-album D-Day in June 2018 and completing promotional activities, Kim told the entertainment website Newsen in a September interview that he was in the early stages of developing his second record. He spent approximately a month and a half recording for the album. An extension of the first, he contrasted the "daytime's intense sexiness" of his first album to the "cool and chill sexiness" of D-Night. The album titles paired together signify that "day + night = Dong-han's one day". Kim wanted to establish a rebellious impression during the album's development. It resulted in a dramatic change in song styles, outfits, dances and hairstyle.

Kim played several parts in crafting the album including writing lyrics and compositions and contributing to his choreography and concept. While conceptualizing the lead single, he decided to dye his hair orange and proposed the idea to his hair designer, who accepted the suggestion. Kim likened the color to autumn and thought it would give off a gangster aura. He supplied lyrics to four of the album tracks and assisted in one of its compositions, marking a transition from Korean idol to soloist to artist. Kim sought guidance from others while contributing to the songwriting on the tracks. Together with the record producers, they made revisions to the album's songs.

While writing "Born", Kim read the lyrics of other songs provided by the album's songwriters to gain an idea of how to express himself. He cited his lack of songwriting experience for taking this approach. He described the track as a "lovable and bubbly" song that was constructed in dedication to his fans. He crafted his first rap on "Call My Name". He noted that the lyrics were contrasted against the song's beat. "Good Night Kiss" was composed by Robin, who had previously co-written Wanna One's "I Promise You (I.P.U.)". Kim wrote a portion of the lyrics in the second verse of the song, where he also made his first contribution to a melody on the track. "Don't Go Yet" was given to Kim by a JBJ songwriter. He decided not to modify the track because he felt that the lyrics "were perfect" and "there was nothing for me to write". The songs were mixed at the Team N Genius recording studio, except for "Good Night Kiss" that was completed at Velvet Studio. The mini-album was mastered at 821 Sound.

== Music structure ==
Musically, D-Night is a dance album that explores hip hop and balladry. It opens with "Born", a mid-tempo song that incorporates a piano loop on repeat. In the lyrics, Kim affirms that he would maintain the same undying love for a woman even if he were to be born again. "Call My Name" is a futurepop track. It uses a "refreshing" synthesizer with an acoustic piano. "Good Night Kiss" is a future bass-infused dance track with a "clean" retro sound. Coupled with Kim's "fluttering" vocals, he describes the thrill of a first good-night kiss. "Tipsy" infuses a groovy beat with an "addictive" chorus. It expresses the joy of being relieved of night time stress. The mini-album closes with "Don't Go Yet", a mid-tempo ballad with an "emotional" melody. Unable to forget a former lover, Kim pines over the girl as his heart waits for her.

== Release and promotion ==
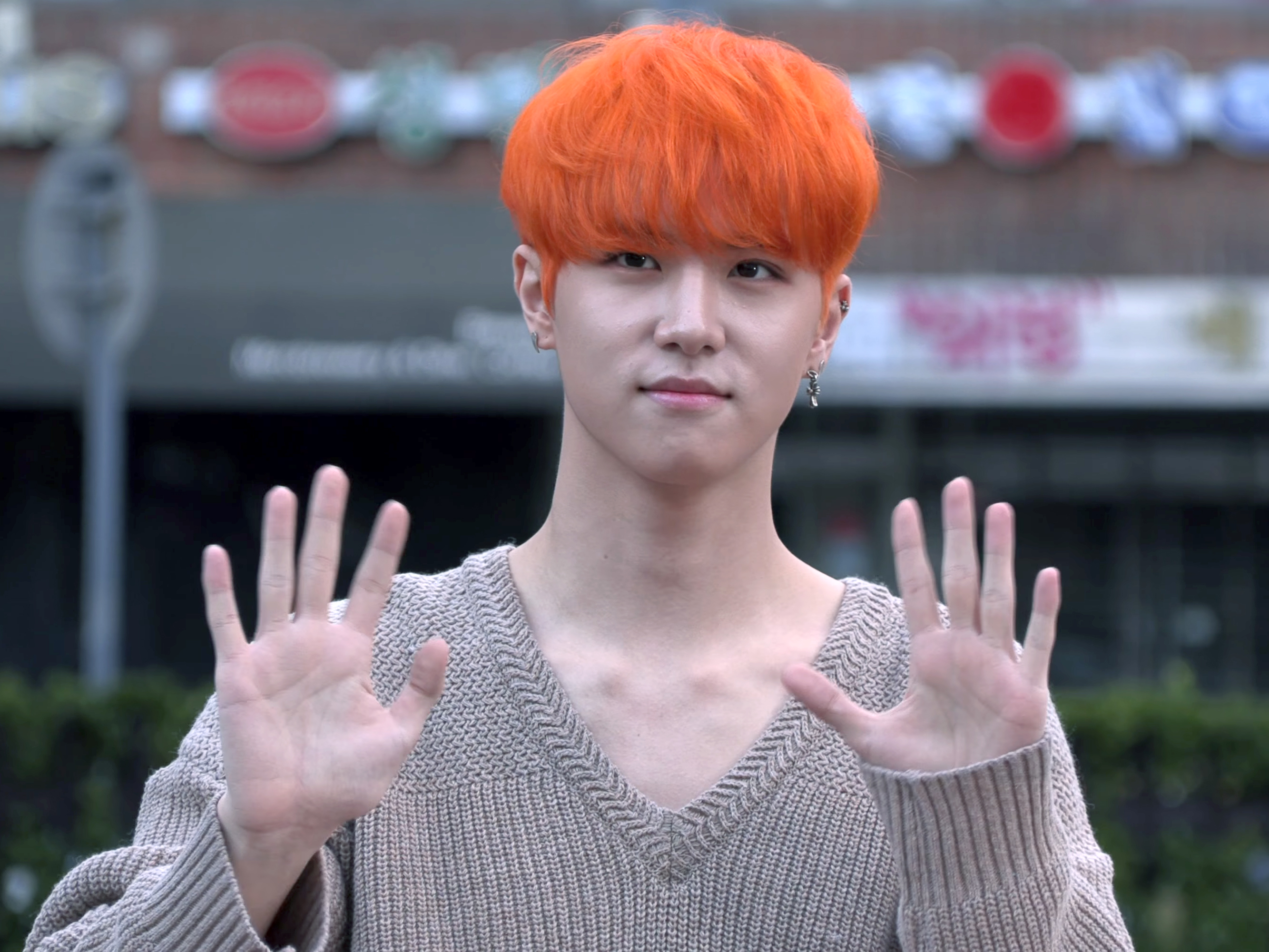
Kim at KBS2's Music Bank

During a broadcast in commemoration of the 100th day since his solo debut on the live streaming service V Live, Kim announced his forthcoming mini-album scheduled for October 17, 2018. On October 1, a black-and-white image teaser depicting Kim sitting on a sofa was posted on his official social networking service accounts. Four concept photos showing him with orange hair were published three days later. The lyrics of the lead single "Good Night Kiss" were shared in their entirety by Kim one week before its release, followed by an ASMR-styled video trailer the next day. A highlight medley of D-Night was uploaded on October 12 and a performance trailer for the lead single followed three days later.

D-Night and "Good Night Kiss" were concurrently released. The music video for the track was directed by Hong Won-ki. Hosted by the announcer Lee Ji-ae, Kim held a showcase for the mini-album at the Blue Square iMarket Hall in the Hannam-dong neighborhood of Seoul the same day. He began promoting "Good Night Kiss" on weekly music chart shows the following day. He performed the single on Mnet's M Countdown, KBS2's Music Bank, Munhwa Broadcasting Corporation's (MBC) Show! Music Core, Seoul Broadcasting System's (SBS) Inkigayo, and SBS MTV's The Show. Kim completed activities on these programs on November 16 to focus on international promotions. He wore an all-black suit with a red choker and appeared from a coffin for a vampire-themed performance of "Good Night Kiss" at the 2018 Mnet Asian Music Awards.

== Commercial performance ==
D-Night accumulated 21,000 pre-orders, which assisted Oui Entertainment in entering the top 100 ranking of the national brand reputation report in the second week of October. The Korea Institute of Corporate Reputation also listed Kim eleventh on its index for male idols for November, the highest for a soloist that month. Pop culture critic Kang Tae-kyu attributed Kim's success to the fans he acquired as a member of JBJ. He cited the fandom's desire to see the members as soloists as opposed to part of a group, which maximized their individual success.

On the chart dated October 14–20, 2018, D-Night debuted at number six on South Korea's national Gaon Album Chart. It ranked on Gaon's top 100 for seven nonconsecutive weeks. By the end of November, the mini-album shifted 19,247 units domestically.

== Critical reception ==
D-Night received favorable reviews from all four critics from TV Daily. Kim Han-kil, Kim Ye-na and Oh Ji-won complimented the album's sexier concept, while Kim Ji-ha called it an attention-grabbing record. Writing for Sports Dong-a, Jeon Hyo-jin picked "Born" and "Tipsy" as the outstanding tracks on D-Night, noting the singer's vocal improvement and his growth as a solo artist.

== Track listing ==
D-Night
No.	Title	Lyrics	Music	Arrangement	Length
1.	"Born"	Obros2, Kim Dong-han, Obros, Zomay	Obros, Obros2, Zomay, 5$, Kim Dong-han	Obros, 5$	3:40
2.	"Call My Name" (내 이름을 불러줘, Nae Ireumeun Bulleojwo)	Moon Hanmiru, Korangi, Kim Dong-han	Moon Hanmiru, Korangi	Korangi	3:28
3.	"Good Night Kiss"	Robin, Kim Gyeong, Kim Dong-han	Robin	Robin	3:13
4.	"Tipsy"	Kang Eun-jeong, Kim Dong-han	Andrew Choi, Jonatan Gusmark, Ludvig Evers, Karen Ann Poole	Jonatan Gusmark, Ludvig Evers	3:14
5.	"Don't Go Yet" (아직은, Ajigeun)	Zomay, Obros, Real-Fantasy, Bello	Obros, Zomay, Real-Fantasy, Bello	Obros, Real-Fantasy, Zomay	3:34
Total length:					17:09

== Credits ==
Credits adapted from the mini-album's liner notes.

- 5$ – arrangement, composition, drum programming, electric piano, piano, synthesizer
- Bello – composition, lyrics
- Cha Cha – hair
- Andrew Choi – background vocals, composition
- Choi Jae-yeong – mixing engineer
- Choi Jin-yeong – audio engineer
- Euanflow – choreography
- Ludvig Evers – arrangement, background vocals, composition
- Im Seol-i – stylist
- Jonatan Gusmark – arrangement, background vocals, composition
- Jang Jeong-keum – make-up
- Kang Eun-jeong – lyrics
- Kasper – choreography
- Kim Dae-hyeon – guitars
- Kim Dong-han – composition, lyrics
- Kim Dong-yeol – drum programming, piano, strings, synthesizer
- Kim Gyeong – lyrics
- Kim Jong-seong – guitars
- Vana Kim – choreography
- Korangi – arrangement, bass guitar, composition, drums, guitars, lyrics, synthesizer
- Kwon Nam-woo – mastering engineer
- Lee Geon-ho – mixing engineer
- Lee Hae-won – photography assistant
- Moon Hanmiru – background vocals, composition, lyrics
- Na Su-min – mixing engineer assistant
- Obros – arrangement, composition, drum programming, electric piano, lyrics, piano, strings, synthesizer
- Obros2 – background vocals, composition, lyrics, piano
- Odd-Cat – piano
- Oh Se-mi – artwork, design
- Park So-dam – stylist
- Park Geon-sang – photography
- Park Sung-chan – choreography
- Karen Ann Poole – composition
- Real-Fantasy – arrangement, composition, lyrics
- Robin – arrangement, chorus, composition, lyrics, synthesizer
- Song Hye-ran – stylist
- Zomay – arrangement, background vocals, composition, drum programming, lyrics, piano, strings, synthesizer

== Chart ==
Chart (2018)	Peak position
South Korean Albums (Gaon)	6
