= D-Hours AM 7:03 =

Kim Dong-han EP

EP by Kim Dong-han
- Released: May 1, 2019
- Recorded: 2018–2019
- Venue: Seoul, South Korea
- Studio: Oui Studios
- Length: 17:06
- Language: Korean
- Label: Oui Entertainment
- Producer: Wee Myeong-hee (exec.)

Kim Dong-han chronology
D-Night (2018)	D-Hours AM 7:03 (2019)

Singles from D-Hours AM 7:03
- 1. "Focus" Released: May 1, 2019

D-Hours AM 7:03 is the third extended play by South Korean singer Kim Dong-han. It was released on May 1, 2019, by Oui Entertainment and distributed by Genie Music and Stone Music Entertainment. The record's title reflects the beginning and end of someone's day, as well as Kim's birthday. He contributed to the lyrics of all the tracks on the album, which were written amidst his travel schedule.

Following a series of photo and video teasers, D-Hours AM 7:03 and its lead single "Focus" were concurrently released. Kim held a showcase for the mini-album and he promoted the song by performing it on music chart programs across various television networks. D-Hours AM 7:03 peaked at number six on South Korea's national Gaon Album Chart, shifting over 17,000 units domestically since its release.

== Background and writing ==
"Those who work night shifts will go to bed at that hour [7:03], but there are also people who wake up at that hour to go to work. So it's a time that represents both the beginning and the end.

—Kim explaining the album title

The final installment in the D trilogy and time-oriented series, D-Hours AM 7:03 is meant to characterize the "infinite possibilities in dawn's darkness" from 2 a.m. through the "explosive energy" of the morning at 7:03 a.m. Kim further elaborated on the title, saying, "I believe that 7:03 a.m. could be thought of as the end of the day or the beginning of the day." The mini-album's title also signifies Kim's birth date on July 3. He contrasted the "sexy feeling" of his first two releases to the "refreshing and powerful" concept of D-Hours AM 7:03. In between D-Night and recording sessions for his third mini-album, Kim took vocal and dance lessons to improve his expertise. In crafting the record, he wanted to present "various charms" and likened it to a food buffet.

Due to his travel schedule, Kim found few opportunities to write songs; he took time for songwriting while overseas, on airplanes, and in cars. He contributed to the lyrics of all five tracks. He penned the lyrics for the rap section in "Bebe" and remarked on its "calm, romantic sound". In addition to songwriting for "Focus", Kim contributed to the song's choreography. He wrote the melody for "Make Me So Crazy". It was omitted from D-Night as he felt that it did not coincide with the fall season, but decided to include it on D-Hours AM 7:03 upon revisiting the track. Kim wrote between 80–90% of the lyrics for "Everyday". The writing process was the quickest compared to the other pieces, and it was all written in a single session. It was created in dedication to his fans and serves as a love letter to them. He also provided the melody for "Idea" and designed the dance moves for the song's bridge. Calling it a "melodical" and "incredibly great song", it was a candidate for the mini-album's lead single. The tracks were mixed at 821 Sound, Titan Recording Studio, and Cube Studio; the mini-album was mastered at 821 Studio.

== Music structure ==
D-Hours AM 7:03 opens with "Bebe", a lo-fi hip hop track which expresses love at first sight. With its foundation in a Vox synthesizer and a heavy bass, "Focus" portrays a man whose attention is fixated on a woman. "Make Me So Crazy" encompasses a "trendy" beat and a guitar riff layered over the chorus. Thematically, the song depicts a man that is crazy in love. A piano ballad, "Everyday" is about a person spending day after day thinking about the person they love. The mini-album closes with "Idea", an uptempo track that fuses moombahton and EDM coupled with an electric guitar. The lyrics describes infinite love and eternity between lovers.

== Release and promotion ==
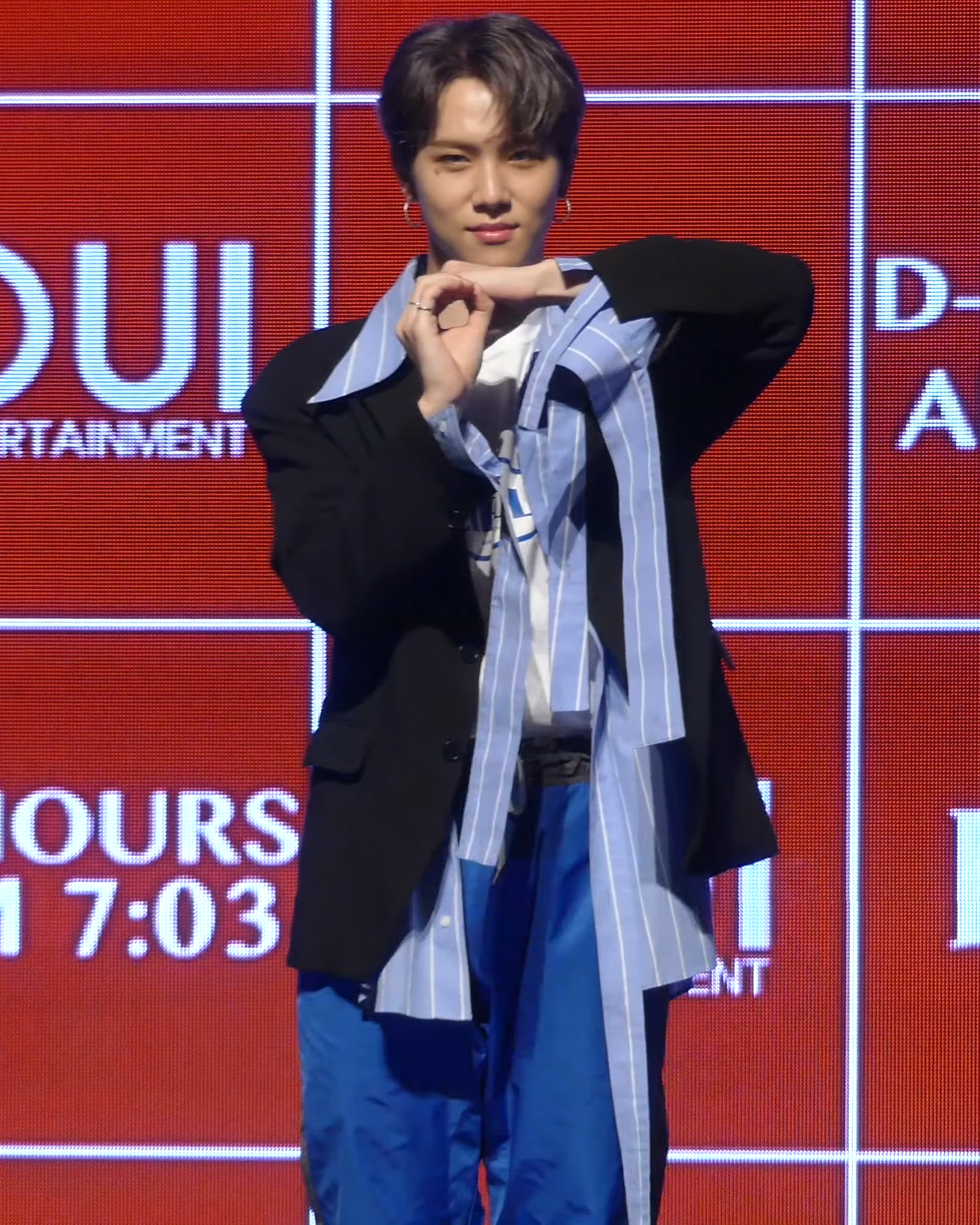
Kim at the mini-album showcase

During a broadcast in commemoration of the 300th day since his solo debut on live streaming service V Live, Kim announced his forthcoming mini-album scheduled for May 1, 2019. On April 22, two image teasers depicting Kim sat in front of white and red curtains, respectively, were posted across his official social networking service accounts. A video containing an additional four concept photos were shared two days later. The track listing was unveiled layered on a morning-themed image teaser on the following day. A video teaser for the lead single "Focus" filmed in hyperlapse was uploaded on April 26. A highlight medley of D-Hours AM 7:03 was uploaded three days later followed by a performance trailer of the single a day later.

D-Hours AM 7:03 and "Focus" were concurrently released. The music video for the track was directed by Hong Won-ki. Hosted by announcer Gong Seo-young, Kim held a showcase for the mini-album at the Blue Square iMarket Hall in the Hannam-dong neighborhood of Seoul that same day. Kim began promoting "Focus" on weekly music chart shows the following day. In addition to the single, also performed "Idea" on Mnet's M Countdown, KBS2's Music Bank, SBS MTV's The Show, MBC Music's Show Champion, Seoul Broadcasting System's (SBS) Inkigayo, and Munhwa Broadcasting Corporation's (MBC) Show! Music Core. Kim completed activities on these programs on May 29 to focus on international promotions. He performed "Focus" during the 25th Dream Concert held at the Seoul World Cup Stadium and the K-pop World Music Festival 2019 in Manila along with "Idea". In support of D-Hours AM 7:03, Kim held fan meetings in Thailand and South Korea in July and September, respectively.

== Commercial performance ==
On the chart dated April 28 – May 4, 2019, D-Hours AM 7:03 debuted at number six on South Korea's national Gaon Album Chart. It ranked on Gaon's top 100 for seven nonconsecutive weeks. By the end of June, the mini-album shifted 17,407 units domestically. The single "Focus" under-performed on music charts. On the Gaon Social Chart, which collects data from YouTube, Twitter, and YinYueTai, the song debuted and peaked at number 61.

== Critical reception ==
D-Hours AM 7:03 received favorable reviews from all four critics from TV Daily. The album was noted for its "strategic choice of concept" and "sexy colors" by Oh Ji-won and Kim Han-kil, respectively. Kim Ji-ha commented that the singer is "steadily gaining ground", while Kim Ye-na observed its "restrained and powerful appeal". The Korean Broadcasting System banned the "Focus" music video from syndication on its network after deeming it "unfit for broadcast". The company determined that it violated regulations for displaying a specific product.

== Track listing ==
D-Hours AM 7:03
No.	Title	Lyrics	Music	Arrangement	Length
1.	"Bebe"	Marco, Bipolar Boy, Kim Dong-han	Marco, Bipolar Boy	Marco, Bipolar Boy	3:20
2.	"Focus"	MosPick, Kim Dong-han	MosPick	MosPick	3:34
3.	"Make Me So Crazy"	MosPick, Kim Dong-han	MosPick	MosPick	3:16
4.	"Everyday" (매일매일, Maeil Maeil)	Kim Dong-han, Rich Jang, Dono	Rich Jang, Dono	Dono	3:42
5.	"Idea"	B.O., KZ, Taebongi, Kim Dong-han	KZ, Taebongi, B.O.	KZ, Taebongi	3:14
Total length:					17:06

== Credits ==
Credits adapted from the mini-album's liner notes.

- An Tae-bong – audio engineer
- B.O – chorus, composition, lyrics
- Baek – choreography
- Bipolar Boy – arrangement, composition, keyboard, lyrics
- Bitbybit – artwork
- Chae Yeon-a – hair
- Choi Bo-yun – photography
- Choi Ji-seon – stylist
- Dono – arrangement, chorus, composition, lyrics
- Ferdy – guitars
- Heo Eun-suk – digital editing
- Hyeon Jin – choreography
- Im Seol-i – stylist
- Jang Jae-min – bass guitar, piano
- Jeon Bu-yeon – mixing engineer assistant
- 조씨아저씨 – mixing engineer
- Jung Jae-pil – guitars
- Jung Jin One – choreography, performance director
- Kang Dong-ha – synthesizer
- Kim Dong-han – choreography, lyrics
- Kim Hye-kwang – vocal edit engineer
- Kim Min-hee – audio engineer
- Kwon Nam-woo – mastering engineer
- KZ – arrangement, bass guitar, composition, drums, electric piano, lyrics, MIDI programming, piano
- Lee Sup – audio engineer
- Marco – arrangement, chorus, composition, lyrics, synthesizer
- Master Key – mixing engineer
- Moon Hanmiru – chorus
- MosPick – arrangement, composition, lyrics
- No Jae-shin – photography assistant
- Oh Diego – audio engineer
- Oh Hyeong-seok – mixing engineer
- Oh! Big Hand – artwork
- Park Jee-won – make-up
- Park Mi-kyeong – stylist
- Rich Jang – composition, lyrics
- Son Yeong-jin – synthesizer
- Song Hye-ran – stylist
- Taebongi – arrangement, bass guitar, composition, drums, electric piano, guitars, lyrics, MIDI programming
- Wee Myeong-hee – executive producer
- YeahNice – chorus

== Chart ==
Chart (2019)	Peak position
South Korean Albums (Gaon)	6
