= Harvest now, decrypt later =

Surveillance strategy

Harvest now, decrypt later (HNDL) (Note: Also known as "store now, decrypt later", "steal now, decrypt later" or "retrospective decryption".) is a surveillance strategy that relies on the acquisition and long-term storage of currently unreadable encrypted data awaiting possible breakthroughs in decryption technology that would render it readable in the future—a hypothetical date referred to as Q-Day.

The most common concern is the prospect of developments in quantum computing which would allow current strong encryption algorithms to be broken at some time in the future, making it possible to decrypt any stored material that had been encrypted using those algorithms. However, the improvement in decryption technology need not be due to a quantum-cryptographic advance; any other form of attack capable of enabling decryption would be sufficient.

The existence of this strategy has led to concerns about the need to urgently deploy post-quantum cryptography or quantum key distribution; even though no practical quantum attacks yet exist, some data stored now may still remain sensitive even decades into the future. As of 2022, the U.S. federal government has proposed a roadmap for organizations to start migrating toward quantum-cryptography-resistant algorithms to mitigate these threats. This new version of Commercial National Security Algorithm Suite uses publicly-available algorithms and is allowed for government use up to the TOP SECRET level.

== Terminology and scope ==
The term “harvest now, decrypt later” encompasses various surveillance or espionage operations in which ciphertext or encrypted communications are collected today with the view that they may one day be decrypted, given sufficient advances in computing power or cryptanalysis. The abbreviation HNDL is sometimes used in technical and policy documents. The “Y2Q” (quantum threat or “Q-Day”) label draws an analogy to the Y2K date-change issue, emphasising a potential future point at which current cryptography may collapse. The strategy is particularly relevant for data with long confidentiality lifetimes, such as diplomatic communications, personal health records, critical infrastructure logs, or intellectual property.

== Mitigation strategies ==
The primary defense against HNDL attacks is the transition to post-quantum cryptography (PQC), which utilizes algorithms believed to be secure against quantum computer attacks. However, because PQC protects the data payload digitally, rather than the transmission itself, the encrypted data can still be harvested and stored.

A complementary approach involves physical layer security (also known as optical layer encryption or photonic shielding). Unlike algorithmic encryption, this method modifies the optical waveform itself—often by burying the signal within optical noise or using spectral phase encoding—to render the transmission unrecordable by standard receivers. By preventing the attacker from capturing a valid signal in the first place, this approach aims to eliminate the "harvest" phase of the threat.

Commercial implementations of harvest-proof optical encryption have been developed by firms such as CyberRidge to secure long-haul fiber networks. Field trials have demonstrated 100 Gbps throughput over legacy DWDM networks using this method.

== See also ==
- Post-quantum cryptography
- quantum key distribution
- Quantum computing
- Cryptanalysis
- Forward secrecy

== See also ==
- Communications interception (disambiguation)
- Indiscriminate monitoring
- Mass surveillance
- Perfect forward secrecy
