= D-Day (ZX Spectrum video game) =

- Developer: Games Workshop
- Platform: ZX Spectrum
- Release: 1984

D-Day is a turn-based strategy computer game for the ZX Spectrum released by Games Workshop, a company known primarily for its tabletop wargames, in 1984.

== Gameplay ==
D-Day is a wargame that simulates the Normandy landings of World War II. Focusing on platoon-level warfare, D-Day tasks players with commanding units representing various elements of World War II combat, including tanks, artillery, trucks, landing craft, and infantry groups. The game features four detailed scenarios based on historical events: "The Landing", "Breaking Out", "To Arnhem", and the "Arnhem Invasion".

Players control individual units using a cursor-based order system. Each scenario is designed for two players, requiring opponents to compete against each other.

== Technical implementation ==
D-Day is written in Basic and lacks anti-copying protection, with the manual providing instructions on how to back up the entire game.

== Reception ==
Roger Kean previewed D-Day in Crash #9 (October 1984), calling it "ideal for play-by-mail" and "a classic strategy war game which requires a deal of skill and judgement against another human opponent".

Andrew Miller reviewed D-Day for White Dwarf #60, giving it an overall rating of 9 out of 10, and stated that "The mechanics of the game are so simple anyone can play it, but in terms of strategy, D-Day is second to none."

Mike Singleton reviewed D-Day for Computer & Video Games #40. The game's presentation is noted to be superb, with a colorful and clear map. The order system was described as easy to use. Mike notes that finding opponents may be difficult, and the length of the game, with each turn taking up to half an hour, may deter some players. Overall, he praises the game for its "high quality".

Home Computing Weekly commented: "Certainly not for the arcade freak. A specialist may appreciate it".
