= Jour J =

French comic book series

Publication information
- Publisher: Delcourt
- Genre: Alternate history
- Publication date: July 4, 2010–present
- No. of issues: 47 (ongoing)

Creative team
- Written by: Fred Duval; Jean-Pierre Pécau; Fred Blanchard

Jour J (English: "D-day") is 52-issue French alternate history anthology comic book series published by Delcourt. Each volume presents a different what if history scenario in which a major historical event either do not happen or takes a drastically different direction than what actually happened in our world.

For the most part each volume is a stand-alone story with the exceptions of volumes 3 and 4 which follow each other, volumes 14, 18 and 21 which together form a trilogy, volumes 22 and 24, volumes 23 and 28, volumes 26 and 34, volumes 27 and 36, volumes 29, 30 and 31, volumes 32 and 33, volumes 37, 39, 41, volumes 38 and 40, volumes 42 to 44 and finally Volume 46 and 47. Each story is illustrated by a different artist.

In July 2015 Delcourt made an exclusivity deal with Amazon to translate and publish 150 Delcourt titles into English and publish them on ComiXology with Jour J being one of those titles. The series would be renamed to "What if" for an English audience, with only 2 issues of Jour J being officially publish into English as of 2022 (Issue No. 1 & Issue No. 5).

== Publication ==
=== Volumes ===
No.	Title	Original release date	English release date
1	Russians on the moon! (French: Les Russes sur la Lune!)	4 July 2010; 275601866X	1 March 2016; 978-2-7560-1866-9
19 September 1969: The USSR wins the 10-year-long Space Race against the United States.
2	Paris, soviet sector (French: Paris, secteur soviétique)	9 November 2010; 2756018686	N/A
December 1951: In the heart of Paris, a serial killer threatens the balance of the Cold War.
3	Red September (French: Septembre rouge)	9 August 2010; 2756018643	N/A
1917: After the fall of France, Clemenceau prepares to take revenge on the German Occupying Force.
4	Black October (French: Octobre noir)	17 November 2010; 2756020117	N/A
1917: French anarchist at the heart of the Russian Revolution.
5	Who shot the president? (French: Qui a tué le président ?)	2 February 2011; 2756018678	1 March 2016; 978-2-7560-8239-4
22 November 1973: America in shock after the assassination in Dallas.
6	All power to the imagination? (French: L'imagination au pouvoir ?)	18 May 2011; 2756024783	N/A
1973: 5 years after May '68 and civil war, Paris is being rebuilt.
7	Long live the emperor! (French: Vive l'Empereur!)	19 October 2011; 2756024791	N/A
2 December 1925: Paris, rumors of an attack on the coronation of Napoleon V.
8	Paris still burns (French: Paris brûle encore)	23 May 2012; 2756024805	N/A
1976: After 8 years of civil war, the UN strengthens its presence in France.
9	Apocalypse over Texas. (French: Apocalypse sur le Texas)	6 June 2012; 275602712X	N/A
1967: 4 years after the annihilation of the USSR, a new nuclear menace looms over the US.
10	The Kennedy Gang (French: Le Gang Kennedy)	19 October 2012; 2756029122	N/A
1947: Welcome to New Orleans, French capital of the Americas and rear base of Prohibition.
11	The Night at the Tuileries (French: La Nuit des Tuileries)	28 November 2012; 2756027510	N/A
1795: 4 years after the king's death, the armies of Marie Antoinette marched on Paris.
12	The Lion of Egypt (French: Le Lion d'Égypte)	6 March 2013; 2756035483	N/A
1503: Leonardo Da Vinci's war Machines Revolutionize the art of war in the Mediterranean.
13	Columbus Pasha (French: Colomb Pacha)	6 June 2013; 275603536X	N/A
1492 : Abdul Columbus Discovers the Americas in the name of Allah the [Redacted].
14	The End (French: Oméga)	18 September 2013; 2756041017	N/A
1942: The suspicious death of an Aeropostale hero refreshes the embers of The Hundred Years' Wars.
15	The Sect of Nazareth (French: La Secte de Nazareth)	4 December 2013; 2756042129	N/A
Year 33: Pardoned by Pontius Pilate, Jesus congregates his followers in the name of a single god.
16	The White Star (French: L'Étoile blanche)	18 June 2014; 2756048038	N/A
17 April 1912: The Titanic safely links Southampton to New York City after its inaugural voyage.
17	Napolean Washington (French: Napoléon Washington)	17 September 2014; 2756042196	N/A
1799: Adoptive son of George Washington goes searching for El Dorado.
18	Operation Charlemagne (French: Opération Charlemagne)	19 November 2014; 275605156X	N/A
1943: French forces strike at the heart of Perfidious Albion.
19	Jaurès' Revenge (French: La Vengeance de Jaurès)	4 February 2015; 2756060933	N/A
11 April 1930: The SFIO orders the murder of Raoul Villain, Jaurès' Assassin.
20	Red Dragon (French: Dragon rouge)	20 May 2015; 2756059722	N/A
1954: An American nuclear strike saves France at the Dien Bien Phu.
21	The Twilight of the Damned (French: Le Crépuscule des damnés)	9 September 2015; 2756052590	N/A
1943: Fascist France's air force fights its last battle during the Allied landings.
22	The Empire of the Steppes (French: L'Empire des steppes)	14 October 2015; 2756037583	N/A
1242: After the burning of Rome by the Mongols, the Christian armies unite to save the west.
23	The Republic of Slaves (French: La République des esclaves)	10 February 2016; 275606355X	N/A
-58: Spartacus and his supporters challenge the Legions of Rome.
24	Stupor Mundi	13 April 2016; 2756071706	N/A
1243: Frederick II is Christianity's last hope against the Mongols.
25	Our Lady of London (French: Notre Dame de Londres)	24 August 2016; 2756048046	N/A
1220: Last play of the best knight in the world in the English capital of the king of France.
26	The Ballad of the Hanged (French: La Ballade des pendus)	16 November 2016; 2756053562	N/A
1473: High-risk diplomatic visit by the Mali ambassador to a Europe ravaged by the great plague.
27	The Shadows of Constantinople (French: Les ombres de Constantinople)	3 March 2017; 2756080500	N/A
1453: Vlad III Basarab, known as the Impaler, Defends The Byzantine Empire.
28	The eagle and the cobra (French: L'aigle et le cobra)	5 May 2017; 2756078379	N/A
-48: The Queen Of Egypt Cleopatra And Her Army March On Rome.
29	The Prince of Darkness 1/3 (French: Le prince des ténèbres 1/3)	16 August 2017; 2756070009	N/A
January 2005: John Kerry becomes the 44 President of the USA.
30	The Prince of Darkness 2/3 (French: Le prince des ténèbres 2/3)	16 August 2017; 2756070017	N/A
11 September 2001: Al-qaida attacks America!
31	The Prince of Darkness 3/3 (French: Le prince des ténèbres 3/3)	22 November 2017; 2756069450	N/A
April 2006: Baghdad, the prime tourist destination in the middle mast.
32	On the road to Los Alamos (French: Sur la route de Los Alamos)	17 January 2018; 275608171X	N/A
June 1945: The meeting of Robert Oppenheimer and Jack Kerouac stops research on the A-bomb.
33	Operation Downfall (French: Opération Downfall)	4 April 2018; 2756081728	N/A
October 1945: Without the nuclear weapon, the invasion of Japan by American troops becomes inevitable.
34	The Green God (French: Le Dieu vert)	16 August 2018; 2756085111	N/A
1475: The Empire of Mali stakes up all love.
35	The Ghosts of Hispaniola (French: Les Fantômes d'Hispaniola)	31 October 2018; 2413013008	N/A
1802: Toussaint Louverture frees all slaves in America.
36	All the gold of Constantinople (French: Tout l'or de Constantinople)	20 February 2019; 2756080497	N/A
1453: End of the great schism between Catholics and Orthodox.
37	Red Moon 1/3 (French: Lune Rouge 1/3)	15 May 2019; 2413008071	N/A
Red Moon 1984: Dissidents of the European Socialist Republic are deported to the moon.
38	The Last Musketeer 1/2 (French: Le Dernier Mousquetaire 1/2)	21 August 2019; 2413008063	N/A
1651: Upon the death of the young Louis XIV, the frondeur princes share the kingdom of France.
39	Red Moon 2/3 (French: Lune Rouge 2/3)	20 November 2019; 2413013741	N/A
1984: Revolt rings in the helium mines of the lunar gulag.
40	The Last Musketeer 2/2 (French: Le Dernier Mousquetaire 2/2)	17 June 2020; 241301585X	N/A
1671: The king of Spain strike the stock on Paris and the kingdom of France.
41	Red Moon 3/3 (French: Lune Rouge 3/3)	2 September 2020; 2413022236	N/A
1984: The moon makes its first revolution.
42	The Great Secret 1/3 (French: Le Grand Secret 1/3)	14 October 2020; 2413023933	N/A
1943: New York hosts the peace conference between Great Britain and the Third Reich.
43	The Great Secret 2/3 (French: Le Grand Secret 2/3)	6 January 2021; 2756090964	N/A
1941: the Japanese army hardens living conditions in the Shanghai ghetto.
44	The Great Secret 3/3 (French: Le Grand Secret 3/3)	31 March 2021; 2413037241	N/A
1943: The Third Reich and the free world clash in New York.
45	The Ravaillac Affair (French: L'Affaire Ravaillac)	6 October 2021; 2413037241	N/A
14 May 1610: The attack against King Henry IV failed.

=== Special Edition ===
Some Volumes have seen special edition rerelease which features some re-edits and added more information on the historical background of the Volumes.

- Special edition of volume 01 – "The Russians on the Moon! – Special Edition" (24 April 2019)
- Special edition of volumes 3 and 4 – "The Russian Revolution – Special edition" (13 September 2017)
- Special edition of volume 6 – "May 68 – Special edition" (14 March 2018)
- Special edition of volume 29, 30 and 31 – "September 11 – Special edition" (16 June 2021)
