= Communications interception =

Communications interception can mean:

- Postal interception, the interception of physical mail
- Wiretapping, the interception of telegraph, telephone or Internet traffic
- Signals intelligence, which includes the interception of military communications
