= D-Day (Kim Dong-han EP) =

Kim Dong-han EP

EP by Kim Dong-han
- Released: June 19, 2018
- Recorded: May 2018
- Venues: Seoul, South Korea
- Studio: Oui Studios
- Genre: Dance
- Length: 17:36
- Language: Korean
- Label: Oui Entertainment
- Producer: Wee Myeong-hee (exec.)

Kim Dong-han chronology
D-Day (2018)	D-Night (2018)

Singles from D-Day
- 1. "Sunset" Released: June 19, 2018

D-Day is the debut extended play by South Korean singer Kim Dong-han. It was released on June 19, 2018, by Oui Entertainment and distributed by Kakao M. After Kim's stint on the second season of Mnet's survival reality series Produce 101 in 2017, he promoted as a member of JBJ with fellow former contestants for seven months. Upon the group's dissolution, he began recording music for his debut solo album. A dance record, D-Day sees Kim explore various genres on the tracks.

Following a series of photo and video teasers, D-Day and its electronic dance lead single "Sunset" were concurrently released. Kim held a showcase for the mini-album and he promoted the song by performing it on music chart programs across various television networks. The song earned him his first music show trophy as a soloist a week later on SBS MTV's The Show. D-Day peaked at number five on South Korea's national Circle Album Chart and has shifted over 22,000 units domestically since its release.

== Background and recording ==
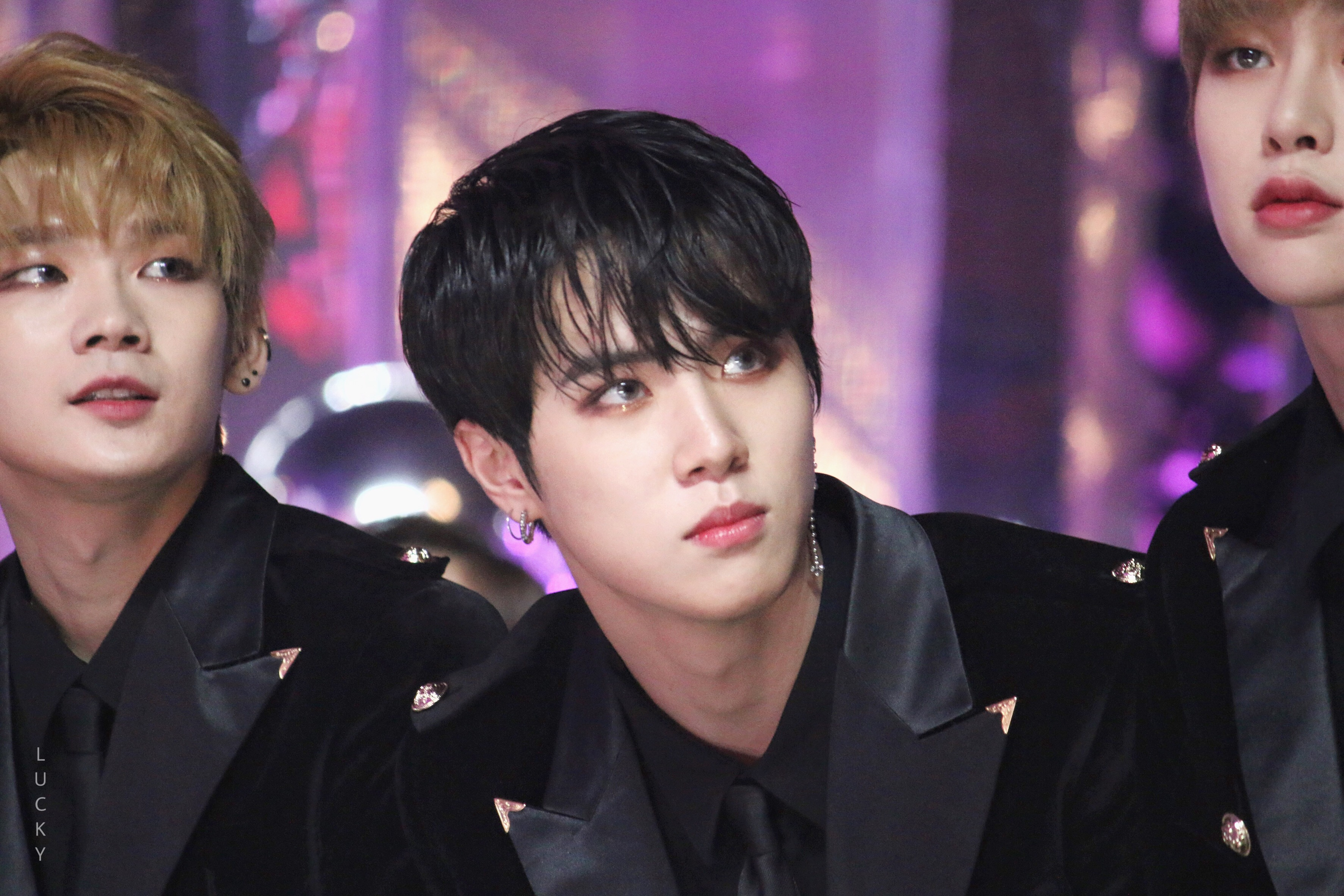
Kim (center) with JBJ at the 2017 Melon Music Awards

Kim participated in the second season of Mnet's survival reality series Produce 101 (2017), where contestants competed to become a member of the boy group Wanna One. He was eliminated from the competition in the third elimination round and finished in 29th place. After his stint on the program, Kim and five other former contestants signed a seven-month contract to promote together in a newly formed unit. The project group JBJ debuted that October. They released three mini-albums and embarked on concert tours in Asia. Kim performed a cover of Taemin's "Move" at the group's final concert, which led the CEO of his agency to believe he could debut as a soloist. Despite calls from fans for JBJ to extend their period of activities, the members' respective agencies failed to come to an agreement and the sextet disbanded the following April. The result left Kim feeling uneasy and he decided to travel to Japan with former bandmate Kenta to relieve stress.

Kim subsequently began working on solo music in early May and he lost 7 kg (15 lb) within a month in preparation for his debut record. He considered himself "more of a dancer than a singer" while in JBJ and decided to home in on his vocal abilities. He chose to drop his "cute" image to assert masculinity and sexiness, explaining that "I made the effort to show a new side of me. I hope many people recognize it." Kim took part in selecting the outfits utilized for the album photos. The mini-album was entitled D-Day after the term, which also serves as an abbreviation for "Dong-han Day".

Kim recorded songs with differing concepts to prioritize diverse compositions. He likened the album to a buffet, "offering a wide selection". Material for D-Day was recorded in the same studio that JBJ had used and Kim spent between four and five hours recording each song. Kim noted his difficulties singing the mini-album's eponymous opening track, describing it as "gentle, bright, and cute" and the "most adorable song" on the record. Korangi penned "Sunset", who had previously composed JBJ's "Call Your Name", and gave the song to Kim. "Ain't No Time" was recorded with Wooseok of Pentagon, though the two did not meet. Kim participated in crafting the song's choreography. He asked former JBJ bandmate Sanggyun to feature on "Record Me". Kim had originally recorded the rap verse and described the final product as more palatable. On the closing track "Night Call", Kim "sang as though I'm about to cry". He found the process strenuous; the recording session lasted 14 hours, which resulted in him injuring his vocal cords. The songs were mixed at the Team N Genius recording studio, except for "Record Me" that was completed at Studio Sean; the mini-album was mastered at 821 Sound.

== Music structure ==
"It has a great beat and sounds exciting, so it was nice to choreograph. Even the title, 'Sunset', goes well with the summer season."

— Kim on choosing the lead single

Musically, D-Day is a dance album that sees Kim explore electronic music, R&B, hip hop, and balladry. It opens with the title track, an alternative hip-hop song. The song consists of a "refined and dreamlike" rhythmical beat accompanied with Kim's "boyish" vocals. He sings in a "sensual" voice on "Sunset", an electronic dance track. The chorus delivers an "explosive" bassline with "emotional" guitar riffs and "dreamy" synthesizers. A tropical-EDM and chill trap number, "Ain't No Time" expresses the narrator's desire to travel to an uninhabited remote island with a lover. Wooseok of Pentagon provides a rap on the track. "Record Me" is an R&B song where the lyrics express appreciation to fans for the "unforgettable love" JBJ received. It features a rap verse by Sanggyun. "Night Call" begins with Kim speaking over the phone. The song is a mid-tempo ballad which conveys the fluttering feeling of a phone call between lovers before falling asleep.

== Release and promotion ==
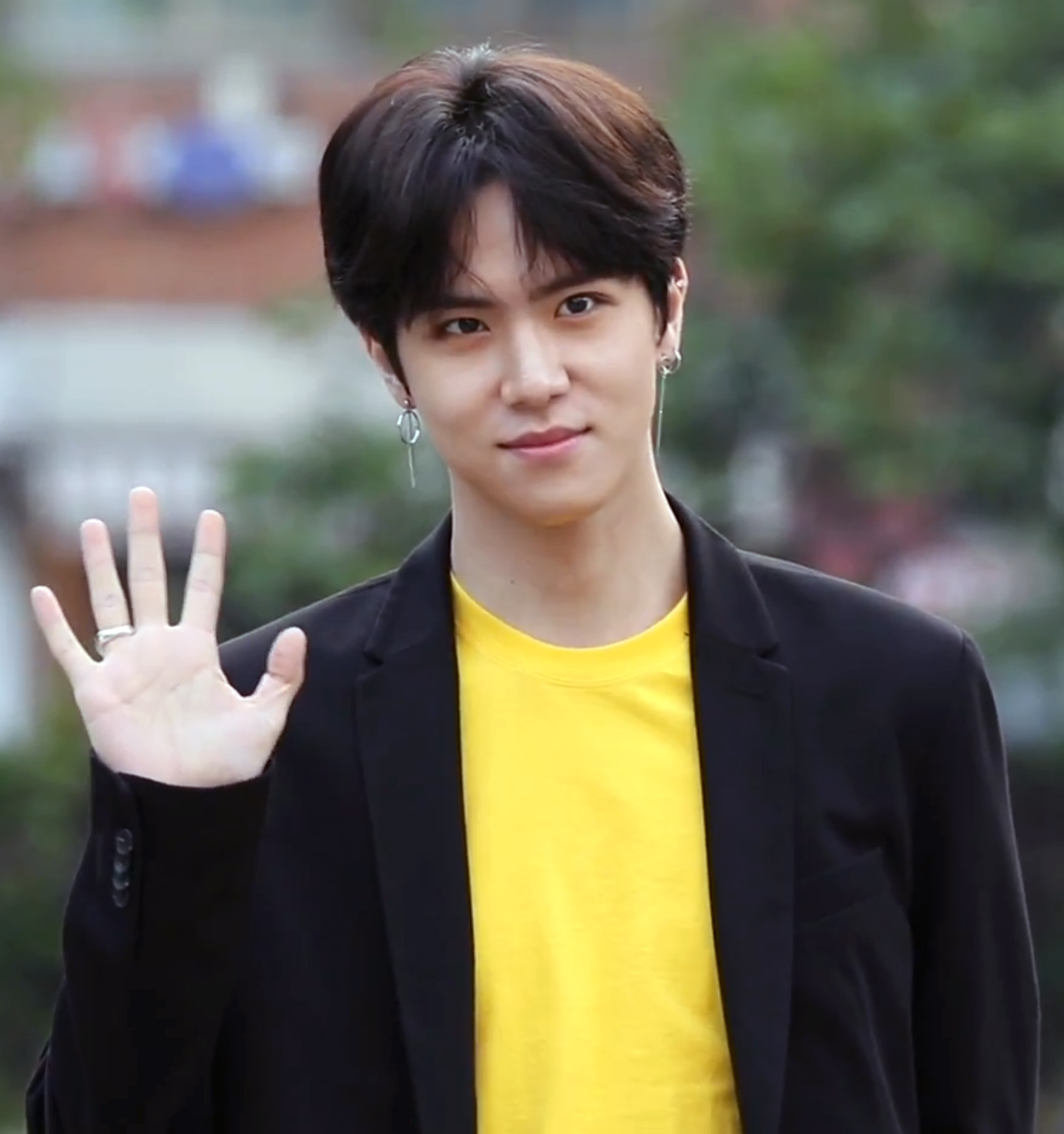
Kim at KBS2's Music Bank

On May 30, 2018, Oui Entertainment confirmed that the release of Kim's first mini-album was scheduled for June 19. On June 4, an image teaser was posted across Kim's official social networking service accounts announcing the date of his debut mini-album. A pair of concept photos were released three days later, showcasing him in red and black outfits, respectively. A highlight medley of D-Day was shared on June 14. Preceding the release of the lead single "Sunset", a performance trailer was uploaded on June 15, followed by a music video teaser three days later. Kim became the first former JBJ member to release a solo album, and the fourth contestant from the second season of Produce 101 to do so after Samuel, Jeong Se-woon, and Yoo Seon-ho.

D-Day and "Sunset" were concurrently released on June 19. The music video for the track was directed by Hong Won-ki. Hosted by MC Dingdong, Kim held a showcase for the mini-album at the Shinhan Card Fan Square Live Hall in the Hapjeong-dong neighborhood of Seoul that same day. Kim began promoting "Sunset" on weekly music chart shows two days later. He performed the single on Mnet's M Countdown, KBS2's Music Bank, Munhwa Broadcasting Corporation's (MBC) Show! Music Core, Seoul Broadcasting System's (SBS) Inkigayo, SBS M's The Show, and MBC Every 1's Show Champion. He also performed the single and "Ain't No Time" on SBS funE's live concert music program The Stage Big Pleasure. In support of D-Day, Kim held fan meetings in Thailand, Japan, South Korea, and Taiwan from July to November.

== Critical reception ==
D-Day received favorable reviews from all four critics from TV Daily. Kim Ji-ha described the approach to the various genres "impressive", while Kim Ye-na felt that the "trendy music colors" were displayed well on the mini-album. Kim Han-kil and Oh Ji-won were enthused by the singer's charm. On the June 26 broadcast of The Show, "Sunset" ranked number one on the program's chart and earned Kim his first music show trophy.

== Commercial performance ==
On the chart dated June 17–23, 2018, D-Day debuted at number five on South Korea's national Circle Album Chart. According to album sales aggregator Hanteo Chart, it was the top selling album by a male soloist that month. The mini-album ranked on Circle's top 100 for seven weeks. By the end of July, D-Day shifted 22,041 units domestically.

== Track listing ==
D-Day
No.	Title	Lyrics	Music	Arrangement	Length
1.	"D-Day"	Eniac, Dumb & Dumber	Eniac, Dumb & Dumber	Eniac	3:39
2.	"Sunset"	Korangi, Moon Hanmiru	Korangi, Moon Hanmiru	Korangi	3:31
3.	"Ain't No Time" (featuring Wooseok of Pentagon)	HSND, Nano, Wooseok	HSND, Nano	HSND	3:32
4.	"Record Me" (기록해줘; Girokhaejwo) (featuring Sanggyun)	Calico Kid	Calico Kid, Versachoi	Versachoi	3:20
5.	"Night Call" (새벽전화; Saebyeok Jeonhwa)	Zomay, Obros, Bello	Obros, Zomay, 5$, Bello	5$, Obros	3:34
Total length:					17:36

== Credits ==
Credits adapted from the mini-album's liner notes.

- 5$ – arrangement, composition, synthesizers
- Angrybird – bass
- Bello – composition, lyrics
- Calico Kid – chorus, composition, lyrics
- Cha Jong-hyeon – hair
- Choi Ji-seon – stylist
- Choi Jin-yeong – audio engineer
- Dumb & Dumber – composition, lyrics
- Eniac – bass, arrangement, composition, drums, guitar, keyboards, lyrics
- Hangang – sythesizers
- HSND – arrangement, composition, lyrics
- Im Seol-i – stylist
- Jang Jeong-keum – makeup
- Jung Han-byeol – drums
- Jung Ho-jin – audio engineer
- Kim Bo-a – vocal director
- Kim Do-hun – chorus
- Korangi – arrangement, bass, composition, drums, guitar, lyrics
- Kwon Nam-woo – mastering engineer
- Lee Geon-ho – mixing engineer
- Lee Won-yong – photography assistant
- minGtion – piano
- Moon Hanmiru – chorus, composition, lyrics
- Moon Jong-hyeok – guitar
- Nano – chorus, composition, lyrics, vocal director
- Obros – arrangement, lyrics, synthesizers
- Odd-Cat – synthesizers
- Oh Se-mi – artwork, design
- Park Mi-kyeong – stylist
- Park So-dam – stylist
- Park Yu-bin – photography
- Song Hye-ran – stylist
- Versachoi – arrangement, composition, computer programming
- Wee Myeong-hee – executive producer, record producer
- Wooseok – lyrics
- Yoon Won-kwon – mixing engineer
- Zomay – chorus, composition, lyrics

== Chart ==
Chart (2018)	Peak position
South Korean Albums (Circle)	5
