= Park Junhee =

South Korean singer-songwriter and actor (born 1994)

- Park in 2026
- Born: June 2, 1994 (age 32); South Jeolla Province, South Korea
- Other name: Jun (formerly until 2023)
- Occupations: Singer-songwriter; actor
- Musical career
- Genre: K-pop
- Instrument: Vocals
- Years active: 2017–present
- Labels: Beat Interactive; Swing; H&P
- Member of: A.C.E

Korean name
- Hangul: 박준희
- RR: Bak Junhui
- MR: Pak Chunhŭi

Park Junhee (Korean: 박준희; born June 2, 1994), formerly known professionally as Jun (Korean: 준), is a South Korean singer-songwriter and actor. He debuted as a member of the boy band A.C.E in 2017 and subsequently competed in the television survival series The Unit. He also starred in the historical romance web series Tinted With You.

Park began his solo music career in 2025, releasing the single "Supernova" and the extended play The First Day & Night. He won South Korea's national selection with the song "Deep Dive" and represented South Korea in the Eurovision Song Contest Asia 2026 finishing in 7th place.

== Career ==
=== 2016–2017: Early career and debut with A.C.E ===
Before his debut, Park trained under CJ E&M and Jellyfish Entertainment. He joined Beat Interactive in 2016 and appeared in a production of the musical Peste that year.

In 2017, Park appeared in the fourth season of I Can See Your Voice, where he was introduced by the nickname "Suncheon's Kangta". He was eliminated in the second round.

Park debuted as a member of A.C.E on May 23, 2017, with the single "Cactus". Later that year, he competed in The Unit: Idol Rebooting Project alongside fellow A.C.E member Yuchan. Park was eliminated in the 14th episode, finishing in 27th place.

=== 2020–2024: Acting and military service ===
In 2021, Park appeared in the web series Sometoon 2021 and contributed to its soundtrack. Later that year, he was cast as Jung Eun-ho in the historical romance web series Tinted With You. In interviews with Teen Vogue, Park discussed his decision to portray a gay character and his views on LGBTQ representation in Korean television.

Park enlisted for mandatory military service on February 7, 2022, and completed his service in August 2023.

Following his discharge, Park portrayed Galileo in a South Korean production of the musical We Will Rock You, which ran from September 2023 to January 2024.

=== 2025–present: Solo career, and Eurovision Song Contest Asia ===
Junhee represented South Korea at the Eurovision Song Contest Asia 2026 in Bangkok, Thailand.

Following the expiration of his contract with Beat Interactive in March 2025, Park established H&P Entertainment, and entered into a partnership with Pan Entertainment to pursue solo music activities.

Park released his debut solo single, "Supernova", in August 2025, followed by his first extended play, The First Day & Night, in September.

In 2026, Park undertook his first solo international concert tour, Into the Ocean, with performances in North America, Europe and Asia. He released his second extended play, Love Method with the lead single "La La La Lune", in August 2026.

Park competed in Korea's Next Wave, South Korea's national selection for the inaugural Eurovision Song Contest Asia, with the song "Deep Dive". He won the selection on September 4, 2026, becoming South Korea's representative for the contest in Bangkok, Thailand.

== Other ventures ==
=== Endorsements ===
In 2026, Park participated in a promotional campaign for the beverage brand Demisoda, recording the commercial song "Demisoda Be Fresh" and performing at promotional events.

== Discography ==
=== Extended plays ===
List of extended plays, showing selected details, selected chart positions, and sales figures
Title	Details	Peak chart positions	Sales
Title	Details	KOR	Sales
The First Day & Night	Released: September 12, 2025; Label: H&P Entertainment; Formats: CD, digital download, streaming	61	KOR: 1,357
Love Method	Released: August 7, 2026; Label: H&P Entertainment; Formats: CD, digital download, streaming	47	KOR: 1,728

=== Singles ===
Title	Year	Album
"Supernova"	2025	The First Day & Night
"Umbrella"	2025	The First Day & Night
"La La La Lune"	2026	Love Method
"Deep Dive"	2026	Non-album single

=== Soundtrack appearances ===
Title	Year	Album
"First Love" (어쩌면) (with Lee Jiham & Kang Yuchan)	2020	My Healing Love OST Part. 2
"Where You Are" (with Kang Yuchan)	2020	The Game: Towards Zero OST Part. 1
"Something" (어떻게 할까?) (with A.C.E)	2021	Sometoon OST
"Is It Just Me?" (썸썸한 사이?) (with Lee Jiham and Kang Yuchan)	2021	Sometoon OST
"Spark" (with A.C.E)	2021	Light on Me OST
"Buzzer Beater" (with Kim Byeong-kwan and Kang Yuchan)	2022	Tracer OST

=== Songwriting credits ===
All song credits are adapted from the Korea Music Copyright Association's database unless stated otherwise.

List of songs, showing year released, artist name, and name of the album
Title	Year	Artist	Album	Composer	Lyricist
"5tar"	2018	A.C.E	5tar (Incompletion)	No	Yes
"If You Heard" (들린다면)	2019	A.C.E	Under Cover	No	Yes
"Holiday"	2019	A.C.E	Under Cover: The Mad Squad	No	Yes
"Clover"	2020	A.C.E	HJZM:The Butterfly Phantasy	Yes	Yes
"Angel" (Korean version)	2023	A.C.E	Angel	No	Yes
"Pinata"	2024	A.C.E	Pinata	No	Yes
"Umbrella" (호랑이장가가는날; Korean version)	2025	Park Junhee	The First Day & Night	No	Yes
"Night"	2025	Park Junhee	The First Day & Night	Yes	Yes
"OMW" (feat. Kim Min-jae)	2026	Park Junhee	Love Method	Yes	No
"At Least, I Tried"	2026	Park Junhee	Love Method	Yes	No
"5 Stars"	2026	Park Junhee	Love Method	Yes	Yes
"Forever Young"	2026	Park Junhee	Love Method	Yes	Yes
"Wonder Why"	2026	Park Junhee	Love Method	Yes	No
"Deep Dive"	2026	Park Junhee	Non-album single	Yes	Yes

== Filmography ==
=== Television series ===
Year	Title	Role	Notes	Ref.
2015	Persevere Goo Hae Ra	Member of Impact	Guest role	
2017	Hello, My Twenties!	Member of The Fifth Column	Episode 4	
2019	Big Issue	Gambling idol	Episode 1	
2020	Zombie Detective	Part-timer		

=== Web series ===
Year	Title	Role	Notes	Ref.
2021	Tinted With You	Jung Eun-ho	Main role	
2021	Sometoon 2021	Kang Tae-su, Seo Ba-da	Main role	
2020	Twenty-Twenty	Cameo		
2017	Melancholic	Cameo	Episode 2	
2014	I Need A Romance	Cameo	Episode 1	

=== Television shows ===
Year	Title	Role	Notes	Ref.
2017	I Can See Your Voice	Suncheon's Kangta		
2017	The Unit: Idol Rebooting Project	Contestant	Finished in the 21st place	

== Theater ==
Year	Title	Role	Notes	Ref.
2023	We Will Rock You	Galileo	Main role	
2016	Peste	Grand	Side character	

== Concert tours ==
- Into the Ocean World Tour (2025–2026)
- Junhee World Domination World Tour (2026–2027)

Awards and achievements
Preceded by None	South Korea in the Eurovision Song Contest Asia; 2026	Succeeded by TBD
