= Kim Woo-seok (singer) =

South Korean singer and actor (born 1996)

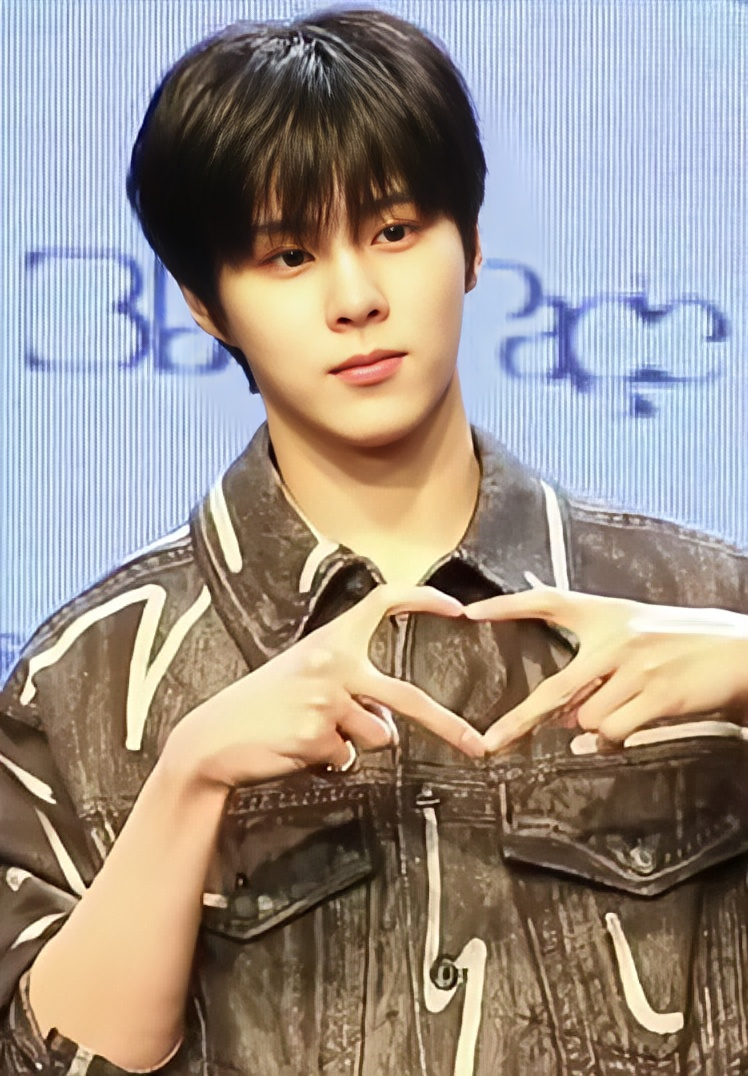
- Kim in April 2023
- Born: October 27, 1996 (age 30); Daejeon, South Korea
- Other name: Wooshin
- Education: Global Cyber University
- Occupations: Singer; songwriter; actor
- Musical career
- Genre: K-pop
- Instrument: Vocals
- Years active: 2015–present
- Labels: TOP Media; Blitzway Entertainment
- Formerly of: X1; Up10tion

Korean name
- Hangul: 김우석
- Hanja: 金佑錫
- RR: Gim Useok
- MR: Kim Usŏk

Kim Woo-seok (Korean: 김우석, born October 27, 1996), formerly known by the stage name Wooshin (우신), is a South Korean singer, songwriter and actor. He debuted as a member of South Korean band Up10tion in 2015. In 2019, he rose to prominence after finishing second on Produce X 101, which made him a member of X1. He debuted as a solo artist with the release of his first extended play, 1st Desire (Greed), on May 25, 2020.

== Early life ==
Kim was born on October 27, 1996, in Daedeok District, Daejeon, South Korea. He is the only child in his family.

On February 28, 2016, Kim was enrolled at Dong-ah Institute of Media and Arts, majoring in acting and K-pop. He later transferred to Global Cyber University, enrolling in the Department of Entertainment and Media.

== Career ==
=== 2015–2018: Debut with Up10tion and solo activities ===
Kim first appeared in Up10tion's pre-debut program, "Masked Rookie King Up10tion" in 2015. He was the first member to be introduced to the group. He made his official debut in South Korea on September 11, 2015, with their first EP, Top Secret.

On October 6, 2016, he was selected as the host of SBS MTV's The Show alongside Jeon Somi. They had their first broadcast on October 11. Six months later, on April 25, 2017, the duo officially left their position.

Kim went on hiatus on June 6 of the same year due to mental health issues, returning nine months later for the release of the group's first studio album, Invitation.

=== 2019–2022: Produce X 101, X1, solo artist and acting debut ===
In March 2019, Kim was revealed to be a contestant of Produce X 101, along with his fellow Up10tion member, Lee Jin-hyuk. Kim placed second in the final episode with 3,120,276 votes, earning a spot in the final lineup. He debuted with X1 on August 27, 2019, with the release of their first EP, Emergency: Quantum Leap. Following revelations of the Mnet vote manipulation investigation, X1 announced that they were to disband on January 6, 2020.

On March 4, 2020, Playlist Studio's CEO, Park Tae-won, announced that Kim would be the male lead of the web drama Twenty-Twenty. The whole cast would begin the filming later in April. On August 15, 2020, the first episode was premiered on Naver TV Cast. The series then also became available on YouTube and JTBC on August 22 and September 6, respectively. On April 23, Kim announced that he would release his solo debut EP, on May 25. On May 25, 2020, he debuted as a solo artist with his debut extended play 1st Desire (Greed) along with the lead single "Red Moon". On August 13, he was awarded the New K-Wave Voice Award at the 4th Soribada Best K-Music Awards in 2020.

On January 18, 2021, it was announced that Kim would make his comeback with a new album in February. On February 8, 2021, Kim released his second EP 2nd Desire (Tasty) along with the lead single "Sugar". On February 18, 2021, Kim received his first music show win on M Countdown, becoming the first Up10tion member to get a music show win. Thereafter, he went on to receive another music show win on Music Bank in February 2021. On March 17, tvN released the full main casts for new drama, Bulgasal, which Kim was selected to be part of. He played as Nam Do-yoon, a high school student who constantly follows Dan Hwal and has an upbeat appearance. It was scheduled to premiere on December 18, 2021, on tvN.

On March 7, 2022, Kim released his third EP 3rd Desire (Reve) along with the lead single "Switch". He received another music show win for "Switch" on Music Bank on March 18. On July 23, Kim held a fan meeting 'KIM WOO SEOK 1ST FANMEETING: NNN'.

=== 2023–2025: Departure from Up10tion, label change and military enlistment ===
In February 2023, it was confirmed that Kim would release his fourth EP Blank Page in March, but was moved to April. On February 28, it was announced that Kim would be leaving Up10tion. On April 3, Kim released his 4th mini album Blank Page, with "Dawn" as the title track. On April 14, Kim took on the role of Baek Woo-hyun, the main character in the healing romance drama, Finland Papa.

In May 2023, Kim embarks on his Asia Fancon tour, The Siren. On June 17, Kim performed as one of the acts at the 2023 Seen Festival in Hoi An, Vietnam. On June 23, Kim successfully ended his Fancon tour with a spectacular finale in Bangkok, Thailand. The concert was held in 5 Asian countries, starting in Seoul, followed by Kuala Lumpur, Malaysia, Tokyo, Japan, Taipei, Taiwan, and Bangkok, Thailand. Just like the name of his concert, The Siren, Kim completely mesmerized fans all over the world with his unique charm. On December 4, Kim starred in LG U+'s Night Has Come, in which he was Nominated Best New Actor at the 3rd Blue Dragon Series Awards.

On March 5, 2024, Kim's exclusive contract with TOP Media expired and confirmed has signed an exclusive contract with Blitzway Studios (Note: Blitzway changed its name to Blitzway Studios on March 29, 2024.) on the same day. BLITZWAY had a merger acquisition with H& Entertainment last year, home of Ju Ji-hoon, Woo Do-hwan and more. On May 27, Kim's agency Blitzway Studios announced his Japan Fancon "AWAKEN" along with a poster, he visited major cities Tokyo and Osaka. On July 25, Kim had confirmed to appear in the series Social Savvy Class 101. On November 13, Kim has released a tribute song to fans for all their support over the years. "In The End" lyrics written by himself and was first revealed at his "October, the twenty-seventh afternoon" fan meeting back in October, before beginning his mandatory military service.

=== 2026–present: Military discharge, continued solo career and acting activities ===
On October 29, Kim will take the stage as Choi Inha, an undercover detective, in the original musical Under Moonbow, which will premiere on December 12.

== Personal life ==
=== Military service ===
On September 27, 2024, Blitzway Studios announced that Kim had started the enlistment process to carry out his mandatory military service and would begin his service in the army as an active duty soldier on November 4.

On November 19, 2024, it was reported that Kim had been appointed Company commander of the trainees at Nonsan Training Center. After completing his training, he serves at the Military Band and Honor Guard of the Army Personnel Command in Gyeryongdae. He was officially discharged on May 3, 2026.

=== Relationship ===
On October 25, 2024, it was revealed that Kim is dating actress Kang Na-eon. They became a couple after the filming of Social Savvy Class 101 ended.

== Discography ==
=== Extended plays ===
Title	EP details	Peak chart positions	Sales
Title	EP details	KOR	Sales
1st Desire (Greed)	Released: May 25, 2020; Label: TOP Media; Formats: CD, digital download, streaming; Track listing: 1. "Intro: Lost"; 2. "Red Moon" (적월 (赤月)); 3. "Sinphony"; 4. "Somebody Like You"; 5. "Do U Like"; 6. "Beautiful"; 7. "The Winter" (그 겨울)	3	KOR: 117,570
2nd Desire (Tasty)	Released: February 8, 2021; Label: TOP Media; Formats: CD, digital download, streaming; Track listing: 1. "Tasty"; 2. "Sugar"; 3. "Better"; 4. "Holiday"; 5. "What are you up to tonight" (이따 뭐해); 6. "Next"	1	KOR: 97,322
3rd Desire (Reve)	Released: March 7, 2022; Label: TOP Media; Formats: CD, digital download, streaming; Track listing: 1. "Ghostin'"; 2. "Switch"; 3. "What More Can I Do?"; 4. "Shame"; 5. "When spring comes" (살며시 봄이 오면); 6. "Satisfied"	3	KOR: 67,672
Blank Page	Released: April 3, 2023; Label: TOP Media; Formats: CD, digital download, streaming; Track listing: 1. "Intro: Blank Page"; 2. "Dawn"; 3. "Love and Hate"; 4. "Heaven, Are you there" 5. "Slip"; 6. "Missing you" (그리워하면)	8	KOR: 43,274

=== Singles ===
==== As lead artist ====
Title	Year	Peak position	Album
Title	Year	KOR	Album
"Red Moon" (적월 (赤月))	2020	— (Note: "Red Moon" did not enter the Gaon Digital Chart, but peaked at number 15 and 17 on the Gaon Download Chart and the Gaon BGM Chart, respectively.)	1st Desire (Greed)
"Sugar"	2021	16	2nd Desire (Tasty)
"Switch"	2022	94	3rd Desire (Reve)
"Dawn"	2023	— (Note: "Dawn" did not enter the Circle Digital Chart, but peaked at number 35 and 121 on the Circle Download Chart and the Circle BGM Chart, respectively.)	Blank Page
"Hello"	2024	—	Social Savvy Class 101 OST
"In the End"	2024	—	Non-album single
"—" denotes releases that did not chart or were not released in that region.

==== Collaborations ====
Title	Year	Peak position	Album
Title	Year	KOR	Album
"Sorrow" (애상) (with Ravi and Yeri)	2020	— (Note: "Sorrow" did not enter the Gaon Digital Chart, but peaked at number 69 on the Gaon BGM chart.)	Fever Music 2020 – Cool Summer Project
"Memories" (with Lee Eun-sang)	2020	— (Note: "Memories" did not enter the Gaon Digital Chart, but peaked at number 45 and 86 on the Gaon Download Chart and the Gaon BGM Chart, respectively.)	Non-album single
"I'm me" (with Kang Yu-chan)	2020	—	Twenty-Twenty OST
"—" denotes releases that did not chart or were not released in that region.

=== Other charted songs ===
Title	Year	Peak chart position	Album
Title	Year	KOR Down.	Album
"Love and Hate"	2023	140	Blank Page
"Missing You" (그리워하면)	2023	146	Blank Page
"Slip"	2023	150	Blank Page
"Heaven, Are You There"	2023	152	Blank Page
"Intro: Blank Page"	2023	180	Blank Page

=== Music videos ===
Title	Year	Director(s)	Ref.
"Red Moon (적월 (赤月))"	2020	Rima Yoon, Dongju Jang (Rigend Film)	
"Sugar"	2021	Rima Yoon, Dongju Jang (Rigend Film)	
"Switch"	2022	Kim In-tae (AFF)	
"Dawn"	2023	Rima Yoon, Dongju Jang (Rigend Film)	

== Filmography ==
=== Television series ===
Year	Title	Role	Ref.
2021–2022	Bulgasal: Immortal Souls	Nam Do-yoon	

=== Web series ===
Year	Title	Role	Notes	Ref.
2020	Twenty-Twenty	Lee Hyun-jin		
2022	Mimicus	Himself	Cameo (episode 2, 3 & 9)	
2023	Finland Papa	Baek Woo-hyeon		
2023	Night Has Come	Kim Jun-hee		
2024	Social Savvy Class 101	Kang Woo-bin		

=== Television shows ===
Year	Title	Role	Notes	Ref.
2016	The Show	Host	with Jeon So-mi	
2016	Heartwarming 11	MC	with Xiao	
2017	The Game Show You See Nak Rank	Game team member		
2019	Produce X 101	Contestant	Finished 2nd	
2020	King of Mask Singer	Contestant	as "Flaming Friday" (episodes 249–250)	
2020	Idol Star Dog-Agility Championship MBC	Contestant		
2020	Wooseok Unboxing	Main host	Season 1–2	
2020	Convenience Store Restaurant	Special MC	Episode 27–30, 49–50	
2020	Boys Mental Camp	Regular member	with Kim Jae-hwan, Lee Jin-hyuk and Jeong Se-woon	
2022	9low On Top	Judge	Thai audition program	
2023	City Sashimi Restaurant / Urban Sashimi Restaurant	Guest part timer		
2023	Hot Place! Coffee Cool House	Special MC	Episode 4–9	

== Musical theatre ==
Musical play performances
Year	Title	Role	Date	Note	Ref.
2026–2027	Under Moonbow (언더 문보우)	Choi Inha	December 12, 2026 – February 28, 2027	Lead Role	

== Awards and nominations ==
Name of the award ceremony, year presented, category, nominee of the award, and the result of the nomination
Award ceremony	Year	Category	Nominee / Work	Result	Ref.
Asia Artist Awards	2021	Male Solo Singer Popularity Award	Kim Woo-seok	Nominated	
Asia Model Awards	2021	New Star Award	Bulgasal: Immortal Souls	Won	
Blue Dragon Series Awards	2024	Best New Actor Award	Night Has Come	Nominated	
Brand of the Year Awards	2021	Male Solo Singer	Kim Woo-seok	Nominated	
Brand of the Year Awards	2022	Male Solo Singer	Kim Woo-seok	Nominated	
Korea First Brand Awards	2020	Male Idol Actor who will lead the year 2021	Kim Woo-seok	Nominated	
Korea First Brand Awards	2021	Male Solo Singer who will lead the year 2022	Kim Woo-seok	Nominated	
Korea First Brand Awards	2022	Male Solo Artist who will lead the year 2023	Kim Woo-seok	Nominated	
Soribada Best K-Music Awards	2020	Voice Award	Kim Woo-seok	Won	
