= From20 =

South Korean singer-songwriter (born 1992)

from20
- from20 in 2026

Background information
- Born: Kim Rae-hwan; February 15, 1992 (age 34); Gangneung, South Korea
- Genres: K-pop; synthpop; R&B
- Occupations: Singer-songwriter; record producer; music video director; chief executive officer
- Instrument: Vocals
- Years active: 2012–present
- Label: Way Better
- Formerly of: Big Star
- Website: waybetterofficial.com/product/campain_detail.html?product_no=18&cate_no=45

Korean name
- Hangul: 김래환
- RR: Gim Raehwan
- MR: Kim Raehwan

Kim Rae-hwan (Korean: 김래환; born February 15, 1992), better known by his stage name from20 (프롬트웬티), is a South Korean singer-songwriter, record producer, and music video director. He is a former member of the boy group Big Star, where he was the main vocalist from 2012 to 2019. In 2021, he co-established the entertainment company Way Better with Hello Gloom and began releasing music as a soloist that year. The pair served as chief executive officers of the record label from its inception until 2026.

== Early life ==
from20 was born Kim Rae-hwan on February 15, 1992, in Gangneung, Gangwon Province. He is the younger of two children; he has an older sister. He was an honors student from elementary school. After scoring poorly on the College Scholastic Ability Test, he decided to pursue a music career rather than attend university. He moved to Seoul at age 20, supporting himself through several part-time jobs and skipping meals when he was unable to afford food.

== Career ==
=== 2012–2019: Career beginnings ===
from20 (center) with Big Star, 2015

from20 made his debut under his given name as the main vocalist of the five-member boy group Big Star of Brave Entertainment in 2012. In 2017, he released a self-produced R&B mixtape entitled 1st Mixtape [20/25; Start to Prefer Blue, Cuz Sometimes I Feel So Blue.] on SoundCloud. Later that year, he competed on the survival competition program The Unit: Idol Rebooting Project alongside bandmates Feeldog, Jude, and Sunghak. On February 5, 2018, from20 enlisted in compulsory military service. He did his basic training at the 22nd Infantry Division and became a full-time reserve soldier. Big Star disbanded in 2019 following the expiration of the members' contracts.

=== 2020–present: Solo career ===
After completing his military service, from20 enrolled in a music production course in 2020. During his studies, an instructor introduced him to the growing popularity of retro synthpop, leading him to discover artists Dua Lipa and The Weeknd, whose music influenced his artistic direction. Wanting to make a "fresh and intense impression", he decided to conceive synthpop records. from20 adopted his stage name, which refers to the age at which he moved to Seoul to pursue music and as a reminder to himself of the "intentions, courage, and confidence" he possessed at the time.

from20 co-founded Way Better, (Note: Originally named The Faker Club, its name was changed in 2023.) an independent record label centered on male solo artists, with Hello Gloom (Ungjae of Imfact) in 2021. The pair had met while filming The Unit: Idol Rebooting Project and continued collaborating after the show's conclusion. In March, from20 made his solo debut with the release of 1st Single [ 20; Still Greedy for Juicy, I'm Kissing This 20 ] and its lead single "Cigarettes & You". Three months later, he released "Radio (Will Sing Our Song)". On November 21, from20 released his first studio album 20 and its lead singles "James Dean" and "20".

From 2022 to 2023, from20 released "Weol", "Chemical", and "Bad Revenge", a revenge trilogy inspired by a former lover. In April 2024, from20 and Hello Gloom held their first joint European tour Fast on the Highway, performing in five cities. The duo released the collaborative singles "Your Love" and "Blue" later that year. In June 2025, from20 released "Eye Candy", a song inspired by early 2000s hip-hop. The following month, he embarked on a second joint European tour with Hello Gloom entitled All Eyes on Me. from20 released the single "Social" in September. Later that year, he collaborated with Kang Yu-chan on a remix of "Body Talk", originally released on Kang's EP Rebel.

from20 released his second studio album Rated R and accompanying lead single "Big Boy" on June 26, 2026. The album is named after the Restricted (R) classification in the Motion Picture Association film rating system, with the letter "R" also referencing his given name. Billboard Brasil described the album as a celebration of "body positivity, self-confidence, and diversity". In September, from20 and Hello Gloom stepped down as CEOs of Way Better to serve as executive director and executive producer, respectively. They were replaced by former DSP Entertainment executive director Yoon Heung-gwan.

== Artistry ==
A K-pop artist, from20 primarily records synthpop and R&B. He has expressed an interest in the popular culture of the 1980s and 1990s. His music has incorporated electronic elements, particularly synthesizers. As a music video director, from20's has drawn inspiration from films such as The Terminator (1984) and Rocky (1976). His first studio album 20 incorporated synthpop, acoustic easy listening, and rock music. from20 has explored a range of musical styles, blending pop and rock on "from20", delving into electropop with "Bad Revenge", and combining R&B with elements of pop on "TMI".

With the release of "Eye Candy" in 2025, from20's music shifted to pop and hip-hop influenced by music from the late 1990s and early 2000s. He further explored R&B and hip-hop on his second studio album Rated R. He has cited Michael Jackson as an artistic inspiration and has expressed admiration for IU. from20's music ranges from high-energy songs to ballads sung in Korean and English. Writing for Vanity Teen, Aedan Juvet described from20's vocal timbre as rich and soulful.

== Public image ==
from20 in concert, 2026

As a soloist, from20 has increasingly embraced more provocative concepts in his music. Writing for Mediafine, Oh Seo-yun described his artistic approach as one that "places discomfort and directness at the forefront", noting a dichotomy between his artistic identity and his family's political ties. from20 campaigned in support of his father, Democratic Party politician Kim Joong-nam for the 2024 South Korean legislative election and again in the 2026 South Korean local elections, the latter of which Kim was elected Mayor of Gangneung. from20's public support for his father's campaign contrasted with the common practice among South Korean entertainers of avoiding overt political expression.

During performances for the Fast on the Highway concert tour, from20 and Hello Gloom raised the national flag of each host country alongside a pride flag. Jang Jin-ri of SpoTV News described their public advocacy of acceptance and diversity as uncommon among male K-pop artists. In a review for Billboard, Jeff Benjamin described from20's KCON LA 2026 performance as a powerful statement, noting that he was "surrounded by a spectrum of different people", while lamenting "the type of diversity K-pop audiences simply do not usually see represented on these kinds of stages". from20 has attributed the inclusion of "different body types, different genders, different skin tones" in his music videos and performances to his parents teaching him to "love everyone regardless of how they present themselves or who they are".

== Discography ==
=== Albums ===
==== Studio albums ====
Title	Details	Peak chart positions	Sales
Title	Details	KOR	Sales
20	Released: November 21, 2021; Label: Way Better, Dreamus; Format: CD, digital download, streaming	—	
Rated R	Released: June 26, 2026; Label: Way Better, Genie Music, Stone Music; Format: CD, digital download, streaming	84	KOR: 1,033

==== Mixtapes ====
Title	Details
1st Mixtape [20/25; Start to Prefer Blue, Cuz Sometimes I Feel So Blue.]	Released: July 31, 2017; Format: CD, digital download, streaming

=== Singles ===
Title	Year	Album
"Cigarettes & You" (친구들은 하나 둘 담배를 피우기 시작해)	2021	1st Single [ 20; Still Greedy for Juicy, I'm Kissing This 20 ]
"from20"	2021	1st Single [ 20; Still Greedy for Juicy, I'm Kissing This 20 ]
"Radio (Will Sing Our Song)"	2021	Non-album single
"Because It'll Be Faster for You to Forget Me than Me Loving You" (내가너를사랑하는것보다네가나를잊는게더빠를테니까)	2021	Non-album single
"F**k You" (가을 어쩌고)	2021	Non-album single
"James Dean" (제임스 딘)	2021	20
"20" (스물)	2021	20
"Weol" (월)	2022	Non-album single
"Chemical"	2022	Non-album single
"Bad Revenge"	2023	Non-album single
"Beat It"	2023	Non-album single
"Demon"	2024	Non-album single
"Your Love" (with Hello Gloom)	2024	Non-album single
"Blue" (with Hello Gloom)	2024	Non-album single
"Eye Candy"	2025	Non-album single
"Social"	2025	Non-album single
"Body Talk (from20 Remix)" (with Kang Yu-chan)	2025	Non-album single
"119" (with Hello Gloom, Kang Yu-chan, Lim Se-jun)	2026	Non-album single
"Big Boy"	2026	Rated R

== Filmography ==
=== Television series ===
Title	Year	Role	Notes	Ref.
The Unit: Idol Rebooting Project	2017–2018	Himself	Contestant	

== List of concerts tours ==
=== from20 X Hello Gloom First Europe Tour: Fast on the Highway ===
Date	City	Country	Venue	Ref.
April 9, 2024	Warsaw	Poland	Hybrydy	
April 11, 2024	Cologne	Germany	Club Volta	
April 12, 2024	Amsterdam	Netherlands	P60	
April 15, 2024	Paris	France	New Morning	
April 17, 2024	London	United Kingdom	02 Islington	

=== All Eyes on Me ===
Date	City	Country	Venue	Ref.
July 22, 2025	Warsaw	Poland	Hybrydy	
July 24, 2025	Cologne	Germany	Club Volta	
July 26, 2025	Paris	France	New Morning	
July 28, 2025	London	United Kingdom	Garage	
July 30, 2025	Helsinki	Finland	Kulttuuritehdas Korjaamo	

=== 2026 Way Better World Tour ===
Date	City	Country	Venue	Ref.
January 17, 2026	Seoul	South Korea	Musinsa Garage	
January 24, 2026	Taipei	Taiwan	Nuzone	
February 7, 2026	Bangkok	Thailand	The Street Ratchada	
March 13, 2026	Kawasaki	Japan	Supernova Kawasaki	
March 25, 2026	Porto Alegre	Brazil	Bar Opinião	
March 26, 2026	Florianópolis	Brazil	John Bull Floripa	
March 28, 2026	Curitiba	Brazil	ViaSoft Experience	
March 29, 2026	São Paulo	Brazil	Studio Stage Eventos	
April 8, 2026	Goiânia	Brazil	Teatro Sesi	
April 9, 2026	Brasília	Brazil	Worlld Brasília	
April 11, 2026	Fortaleza	Brazil	Theatro Via Sul Fortaleza	
April 12, 2026	Recife	Brazil	Teatro Luiz Mendonça	
April 15, 2026	Belo Horizonte	Brazil	SESC Palladium	
April 17, 2026	Belém	Brazil	Teatro Resolve	
April 19, 2026	Manaus	Brazil	Nova Era Hall Studio 5	
April 21, 2026	Salvador	Brazil	Teatro Faresi	
April 22, 2026	Rio de Janeiro	Brazil	Teatro Claro Mais RJ	

=== 2026 Kang Yuchan and from20 [Body Talk] ===
Date	City	Country	Venue	Ref.
July 21, 2026	Paris	France	Alhambra	
July 23, 2026	London	United Kingdom	IAH	
July 23, 2026	Cologne	Germany	Volta	
July 25, 2026	Berlin	Germany	Hole44	
July 27, 2026	Warsaw	Poland	Hybrydy	
July 31, 2026	Budapest	Hungary	Analog	
October 11, 2026	Seoul	South Korea	Space Brick	
December 2, 2026	São Paulo	Brazil	Casa Rockambole	
December 3, 2026	Rio de Janeiro	Brazil	Teatro Fashion Mall	
December 4, 2026	Porto Alegre	Brazil	Bar Opinião	
December 5, 2026	Curitiba	Brazil	Stage Garden	
December 8, 2026	Goiânia	Brazil	Teatro João Alves de Queiroz	
December 9, 2026	Recife	Brazil	Teatro Beberibe	
December 11, 2026	Belém	Brazil	Black Pub	
December 12, 2026	Fortaleza	Brazil	Anima Expo	
December 13, 2026	Belo Horizonte	Brazil	Cine Odeon	
