= One-of-a-Kind Romance =

2026 South Korean television series

- Promotional poster
- Hangul: 유일무이 로맨스
- RR: Yuilmui romaenseu
- MR: Yuilmui romaensŭ
- Genre: Romantic comedy
- Based on: One-of-a-Kind Romance by Dooboo
- Written by: Jeon Hyun-mi
- Directed by: Kim Jin-young
- Starring: Joy; Kim Hyun-jin; Shin Hyun-soo; Kang Na-eon
- Music by: Kim Jong-cheon
- Country of origin: South Korea
- Original language: Korean
- No. of episodes: 2

Production
- Production company: Copus Korea

Original release
- Network: TVING
- Release: November 9, 2026 – present

One-of-a-Kind Romance (Korean: 유일무이 로맨스) is an ongoing South Korean romantic comedy television series written by Jeon Hyun-mi, directed by Kim Jin-young, and starring Joy, Kim Hyun-jin, Shin Hyun-soo, and Kang Na-eon. Based on Naver Webtoon of the same name by Dooboo, the adaptation follows the relationship between Gong Yu-il, a job seeker, and Tak Mu-i, an actor. The series premiered on TVING on November 9, 2026. It is also available for streaming on Viu and Abema.

== Synopsis ==
Gong Yu-il, an ordinary job seeker, unexpectedly becomes the manager for Tak Mu-i, a top actor and former child star who suffers from psychological trauma due to persistent stalking. Their professional relationship is underpinned by a secret connection: Mu-i is a dedicated fan of a novel Yu-il wrote years ago, which helped him overcome a previous career slump. As they navigate their new dynamic, they are joined by Kang Hee-su, a star chef with a mysterious background who employs Yu-il at his restaurant, and Ju Da-hong, an actress and childhood friend of Mu-i who develops a rivalry with Yu-il.

== Cast and characters ==
=== Main ===
- Joy as Gong Yu-il
- Kim Hyun-jin as Tak Mu-i
- Shin Hyun-soo as Kang Hee-su
- Kang Na-eon as Ju Da-hong

=== Supporting ===
- Na Hyun-young as Yoo Yeon-ju

=== Special appearances ===
- Lee Jong-hyuk as Yu-il's father
- Jin Kyung as Yu-il's mother

== Production ==
=== Development ===
In July 2025, it was reported that Copus Korea had secured the rights to adapt One-of-a-Kind Romance into a drama. The company previously produced Short (2018), Dali & Cocky Prince (2021), and The Tale of Lady Ok (2024–2025). While industry sources confirmed the production plans, Naver Webtoon representatives stated that they could not confirm the specific details of the contract at that time.

In February 2026, Copus Korea officially announced the production of the adaptation helmed by Kim Jin-young and written by Jeon Hyun-mi, a winner of the SBS Drama Screenplay Contest. The project received financial support for production from the Korea Creative Content Agency.

=== Casting ===
Kim Hyun-jin and Joy were cast to lead the series in September 2025, followed by Kang Na-eon in January 2026. The next month, Joy, Kim, Kang, and Shin Hyun-soo were confirmed to play the central characters, respectively.

In mid-February 2026, Na Hyun-young joined the cast. Shortly after, Lee Jong-hyuk and Jin Kyung joined the project to make special appearances as the parents of Joy's character.

=== Filming ===
Principal photography began in early 2026.

== Release ==
The series was scheduled to be released on TVING in November 2026, later being confirmed to premiere on November 9, at 18:00 (KST). It is also available for streaming on Viu in selected regions and Abema in Japan.
