= A.C.E (South Korean band) =

South Korean boy band

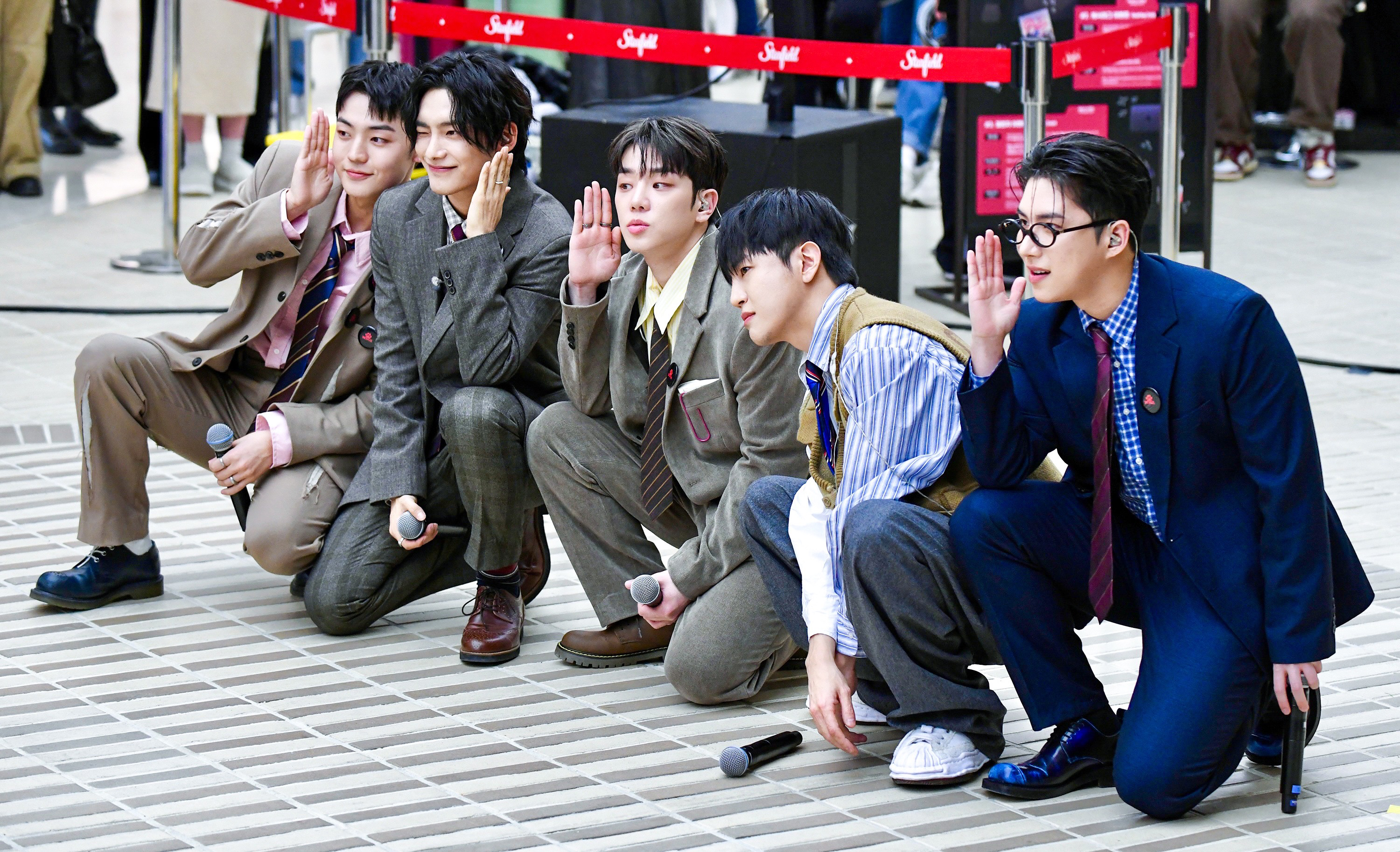
- A.C.E in 2024; From left: Kang Yuchan, Park Junhee, Kim Byeongkwan, Lee Jiham, Wow

Background information
- Origin: Seoul, South Korea
- Genre: K-pop
- Years active: 2017–present
- Labels: Beat Interactive; Swing; Asian Agent
- Members: Park Junhee; Lee Jiham; Wow; Kim Byeongkwan; Kang Yuchan
- Website: Official website

A.C.E (Korean: 에이스; acronym for "Adventure Calling Emotions".) is a South Korean boy band formed by Beat Interactive and co-managed with Swing Entertainment. The group consists of five members: Park Junhee, Lee Jiham (formerly Lee Donghun), Wow (Kim Sehyoon), Kim Byeongkwan, and Kang Yuchan. The group debuted on May 23, 2017, with the single "Cactus".

A.C.E first gained a following busking on the streets of the hip Hongdae district in Seoul, covering the dance choreography of popular groups, prior to their official debut.

As of March 2024, the group have released 2 repackaged albums, 5 mini-albums, and 2 single albums.

== History ==
=== Pre-debut ===
Park Junhee trained under Jellyfish Entertainment alongside VIXX before transferring to CJ E&M. He appeared on Mnet's I Can See Your Voice as Kangta's look-alike. Lee Jiham competed on Superstar K5 prior to becoming a trainee under CJ E&M, and later appeared on I Can See Your Voice as well, winning the episode and earning high praise from Got7's JB. Kim Sehyoon trained at YG Entertainment alongside Winner before later moving to CJ E&M, where he met Park Junhee and Lee Jiham. Kim Byeongkwan participated in the first season of K-pop Star but was eliminated during the final round of casting. Before debut Kang Yuchan used to be in a breakdance group named Valentine Crew in high school, winning multiple competitions. He later joined Alive87 crew under the dance name AkaBuggy in which he specialized in popping. He was in a lot of dance competitions like Street Fighter Vol.2, Defender 16 and Cipher vol4. Kim Byeongkwan and Kang Yuchan trained under JYP Entertainment before joining Beat Interactive.

=== 2017–2018: Cactus, Callin, and A.C.E Adventures in Wonderland ===
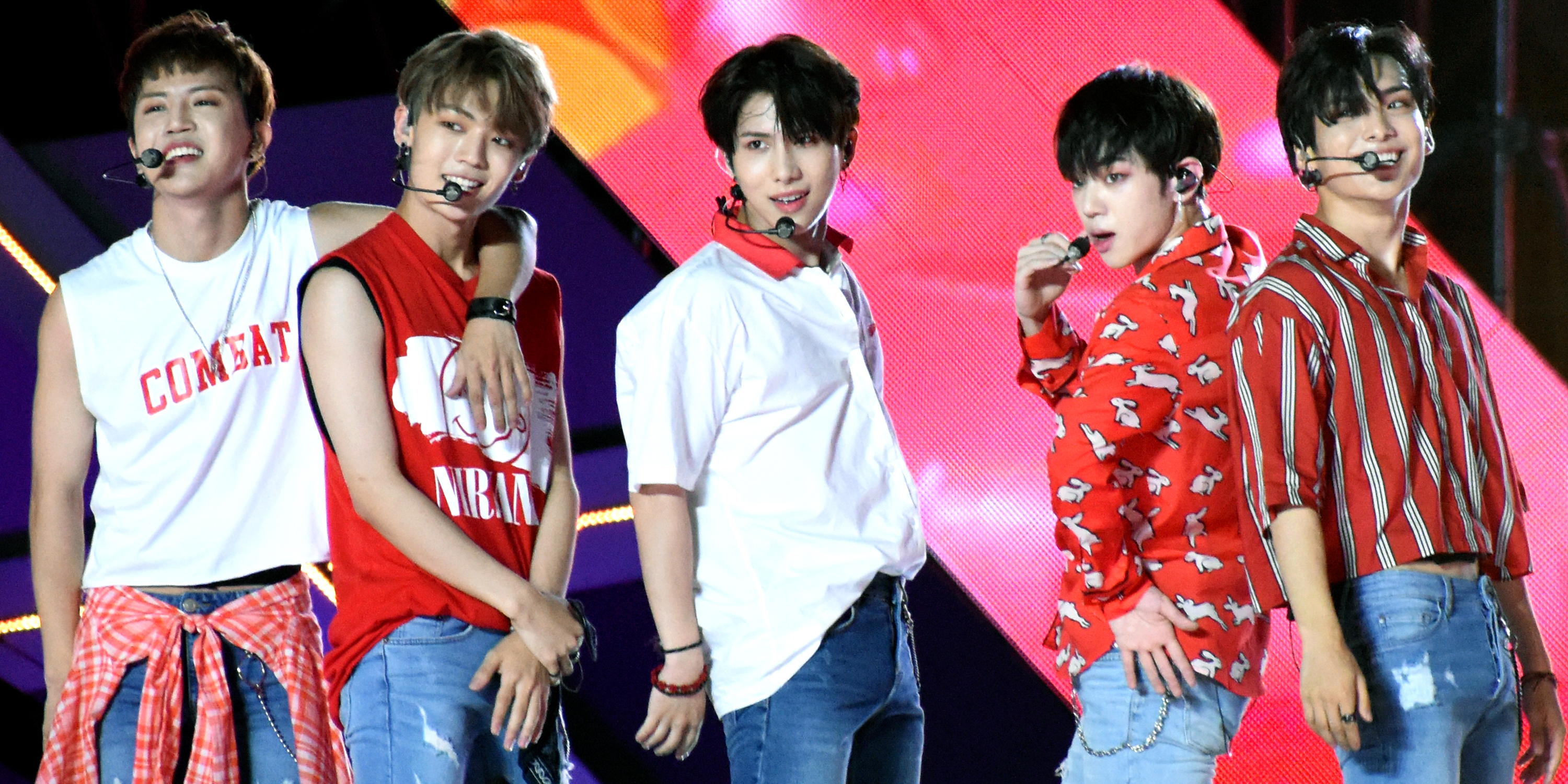
A.C.E at the 2018 Incheon Airport Sky Festival From left: Donghun, Chan, Wow, Kim Byeongkwan, Jun

On May 23, 2017, A.C.E released their debut single album Cactus, a hardstyle song produced by Zoobeater Sound. The members debuted with the stage names Jun, Donghun, Wow, Kim Byeongkwan, and Chan.

A.C.E released their second single album Callin' on October 19, 2017.

In October 2018, all group members participated in the survival shows The Unit and Mix Nine. Jun and Chan competed on The Unit, and Donghun, Wow, and Kim Byeongkwan competed on Mix Nine under their given names. Kim Byeongkwan and Lee Donghun won 4th and 8th place respectively on Mix Nine in January 2018. They began preparations to debut in a temporary boy group, but the debut was cancelled later that year. Kang Yuchan won 9th place on The Unit in February 2018. He debuted with the temporary boy group UNB on April 7, 2018, and they finished their promotions on January 27, 2019.

On March 15, 2018, the group released a special single titled "5TAR (Incompletion)", with the song serving as a gift to fans after their brief hiatus to join The Unit and Mix Nine.

On June 7, 2018, A.C.E released their first repackaged album A.C.E Adventures in Wonderland with the title track "Take Me Higher". Chan did not take part in the album due to his promotions with UNB.

A.C.E featured on their first collaboration with French DJ Hcue for the track "I Feel So Lucky" released on September 14, 2018, aiming for a Moombahton sound fused with K-pop elements.

=== 2019–2020: Under Cover, Under Cover : The Mad Squad, and HJZM : The Butterfly Phantasy ===
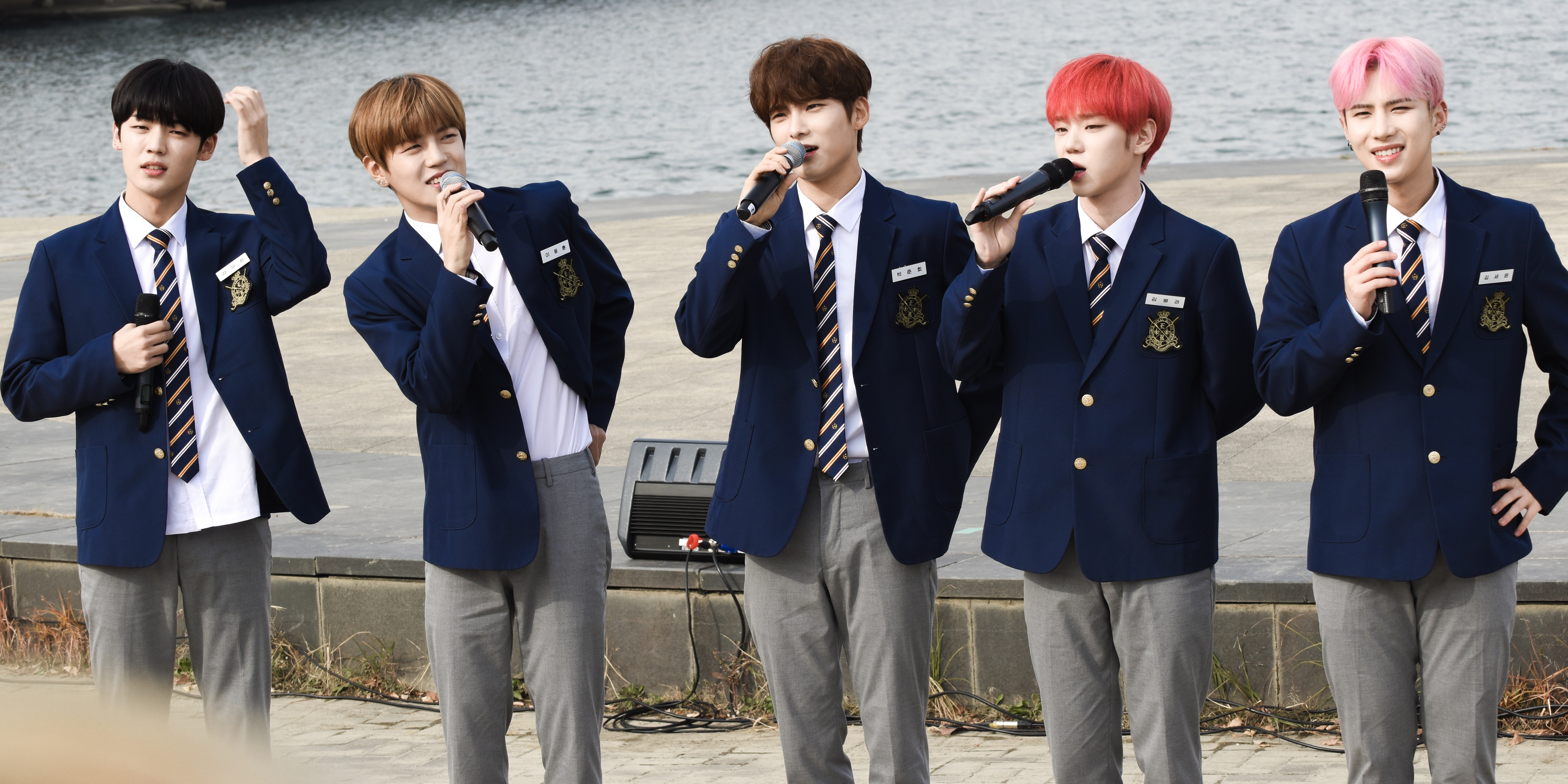
A.C.E busking in Banpo-dong, November 2019 From left: Chan, Donghun, Jun, Kim Byeongkwan, Wow

On May 17, 2019, A.C.E released their second extended play Under Cover with five songs, including a title track of the same name.

A.C.E released their third extended play Under Cover: The Mad Squad on October 29, 2019, containing six tracks with "Savage" serving as its lead single.

A.C.E released their fourth extended play HJZM: The Butterfly Phantasy on September 2, 2020, with the title track "Goblin (Favorite Boys)," along with four other songs. On December 18, 2020, A.C.E signed with Asian Agent for global management.

A.C.E released a remix titled "Fav Boyz" on January 8, 2021, of their song "Goblin (Favorite Boys)" by American DJ Steve Aoki, featuring the Nigerian-American rapper Thutmose.

=== 2021–2022: Added management agency, Siren: Dawn, Changer: Dear Eris, and military enlistments ===
On February 5, 2021, it was announced that Swing Entertainment would co-manage A.C.E alongside Beat Interactive. Swing Entertainment will be in charge of artist's domestic broadcasting appearances, while Beat Interactive is in charge of production, global marketing, artist care management and fan marketing.

On April 16, 2021, A.C.E released the collaboration single "Down", featuring Grey.

A.C.E released their fifth five-track EP Siren: Dawn on June 23, 2021, with the lead single "Higher". The EP was praised by NME, which stated: "Keep an eye on this headstrong quintet, because there's no question they'll surprise us in the years to come."

A.C.E released "Spark" as part of the original soundtrack for boys' love Korean drama Light on Me on July 8, 2021. Their participation on the song showed support for the LGBTQ+ community. Leader Jun said of the release, "Just like how all of our fans, CHOICE, are different in their own special ways, we know that there [are] a range of different ways to love among all kinds of people in this world which we acknowledge and respect."

A.C.E released their second repackaged album Changer: Dear Eris on September 2, 2021, with the lead single "Changer".

On August 20, 2021, it was announced that Wow would enlist for his mandatory military service on September 10, 2021, as a public service worker. On September 23, 2021, Donghun enlisted for his military service as a public service worker. On February 7, 2022, Jun enlisted for his military service as an active duty soldier. On April 11, 2022, Kim Byeongkwan enlisted for his military service as a member of KATUSA, the second K-pop idol to do so after Day6's Young K. On August 16, 2022, Chan enlisted for his military service as an active duty soldier.

On June 9, 2023, Wow was officially discharged from military service. On June 22, 2023, Donghun was discharged from military service, and on the 25th, he completed his first schedule with Wow after returning. On August 6, 2023, Jun was discharged from military service, and on the 8th, he completed his first schedule with Wow after returning. On October 13, 2023, Kim Byeongkwan completed his first schedule after being discharged from military service. On February 15, 2024, Kang Yuchan completed his first schedule after being discharged from military service.

=== 2023–present: Returning projects following mandatory military service, My Girl: "My Choice" and "Supernatural" ===
On August 12, 2023, Beat Interactive announced that members Donghun, Jun, and Chan would begin using their given names Lee Donghun, Park Junhee, and Kang Yuchan for promotion. Wow would be the only remaining member to use a stage name.

On November 7, 2023, A.C.E released the first pre-release single "Effortless" for their sixth mini-album.

On November 11, 2023, A.C.E held their first fan concert after their completion of their military service, titled Overturn. Kang Yuchan did not perform at the concert due to his military service. They performed their newly released pre-release single "Effortless" as well as their then-upcoming pre-release single "Angel" for the first time.

On November 16, 2023, A.C.E released the second pre-release single "Angel" for their 6th mini album.

==== My Girl: "My Choice" ====
On February 22, 2024, A.C.E released their sixth mini album My Girl: "My Choice" with the lead single "My Girl". Kang Yuchan did not take part in the album due to his military service. Their album release project, titled "PetFlix", included the opening of an official website designed with an OTT site concept. The project also featured a 5-member busking event (including Yuchan, who returned from enlistment the day prior) on February 16 at COEX Mall before the release.

In April 2024, A.C.E held a fanmeeting "Home Sweet A.C.E" for the first time in 3 years in Korea. Later in April the band toured in Japan before releasing the special single "Supernatural" on May 31, 2024, as a full unit, marking member Kang Yuchan's first official release since his return from military enlistment. Supernatural gained popularity in the US giving A.C.E their first entry in the Top 100 Mainstream Top 40 Airplay chart, where it ranked 93rd by the 40 largest radio stations in the U.S. It also ranked 63rd in the Media Base Top 40 music chart following BTS, Blackpink, NewJeans, TXT, and Monsta X.

In June 2024, A.C.E toured the US with their "Rewind:US" tour covering 14 cities and performed at KCON in Los Angeles.

In July 2024, A.C.E announced Latam and European dates for the "Rewind:US" tour.

On February of 2025, Lee Donghun revealed that he changed his legal name to Lee Jiham.

== Members ==
- Lee Jiham (이지함) (Formerly Lee Donghun 이동훈) – vocalist
- Wow (와우) – dancer, rapper, vocalist
- Park Junhee (박준희) – leader, vocalist, dancer
- Kim Byeongkwan (김병관) – dancer, rapper, vocalist
- Kang Yuchan (강유찬) – vocalist

== Discography ==
=== Reissues ===
Title	Album details	Peak chart positions	Sales
Title	Album details	KOR	Sales
A.C.E Adventures in Wonderland	Released: June 7, 2018; Label: Beat Interactive; Formats: CD, digital download; Track listing: 1. "Cactus" (선인장); 2. "Callin'"; 3. "Black and Blue"; 4. "Take Me Higher"; 5. "Dessert"; 6. "5tar (Incompletion)"; 7. "Cactus" (선인장) (Inst.); 8. "Callin'" (Inst.); 9. "5tar (Incompletion)" (Inst.)	6	KOR: 19,984
Changer: Dear Eris	Released: September 2, 2021; Label: Beat Interactive, Swing Entertainment; Formats: CD, digital download; Track listing: 1. "Intro: Revolutions"; 2. "Changer"; 3. "Black and Blue" (Complete ver.); 4. "Down" (Kor ver.); 5. "Talk You Down" (해주고 싶은 한마디); 6. "Prequel" (진도 아리랑); 7. "Cactus" (선인장) (Eng ver.); 8. "Cactus" (선인장) (Remix ver.); 9. "Remember Us"; 10. "Remember Us Inst." (Secret Voice Letter) (CD Only)	7	KOR: 36,284

=== Extended plays ===
Title	EP details	Peak chart positions		Sales
Title	EP details	KOR	US World	Sales
Under Cover	Released: May 17, 2019; Label: Beat Interactive; Formats: CD, digital download; Track listing: 1. "Do It Like Me"; 2. "Under Cover"; 3. "Mr. Bass"; 4. "If You Heard"; 5. "5tar" (CD only)	8	9	KOR: 29,812
Under Cover: The Mad Squad	Released: October 29, 2019; Label: Beat Interactive; Formats: CD, digital download; Track listing: 1. "Intro: Escape"; 2. "Savage" (삐딱선); 3. "Slow Dive"; 4. "So Sick" (나쁜말); 5. "Holiday"; 6. "Take Me Higher" (Complete Ver.)	7	—	KOR: 39,616
HJZM: The Butterfly Phantasy	Released: September 2, 2020; Label: Beat Interactive; Formats: CD, digital download; Track listing: 1. "Golden Goose"; 2. "Favorite Boys" (도깨비); 3. "Baby Tonight" (황홀경) (恍惚境); 4. "Stand by You" (편지를 써); 5. "Clover"	4	—	KOR: 61,969
Siren: Dawn	Released: June 23, 2021; Labels: Beat Interactive, Swing Entertainment; Formats: CD, digital download; Track listing: 1. "Intro: Miserere Mei Deus (We Fell Down)"; 2. "Atlantis"; 3. "Higher"; 4. "Chasing Love"; 5. "Story"	2	—	KOR: 74,880
My Girl: "My Choice"	Released: February 22, 2024; Labels: Beat Interactive, Swing Entertainment; Formats: CD, digital download; Track listing: 1. "Effortless"; 2. "My Girl"; 3. "Angel"; 4. "Facetime"; 5. "Effortless" (Eng ver.); 6. "My Girl" (Eng ver.); 7. "Angel" (Eng ver.)	10	—	KOR: 48,279
Pinata	Released: November 20, 2024; Labels: Beat Interactive, Swing Entertainment; Formats: CD, digital download; Track listing: 1. "Intro: Recuerda, Recuerda"; 2. "Pinata"; 3. "Pinata" (English version); 4. "Pinata" (inst.)	20	—	KOR: 47,369

=== Single albums ===
Title	Album details	Peak chart positions	Sales
Title	Album details	KOR	Sales
Cactus	Released: May 23, 2017; Label: Beat Interactive; Formats: CD, digital download	24	KOR: 900
Callin'	Released: October 18, 2017; Label: Beat Interactive; Formats: CD, digital download	28	KOR: 1,000

=== Singles ===
==== Korean singles ====
Title	Year	Peak chart positions		Album
Title	Year	KOR Circle	US World	Album
"Cactus" (선인장; Seoninjang)	2017	—	21	Cactus
"Callin'"	2017	—	—	Callin'
"5TAR (Incompletion)"	2018	—	—	Non-album single
"Take Me Higher"	2018	—	15	A.C.E Adventures in Wonderland
"Under Cover"	2019	—	23	Under Cover
"Savage" (삐딱선)	2019	—	—	Under Cover: The Mad Squad
"Favorite Boys" (도깨비)	2020	—	—	HJZM: The Butterfly Phantasy
"Higher"	2021	—	—	Siren: Dawn
"Changer"	2021	— (Note: "Changer" did not enter Gaon Digital Chart, but debuted and peaked at number 64 on Gaon Download Chart.)	—	Changer: Dear Eris
"Effortless"	2023	—	10	Non-album singles
"My Girl"	2024	—	—	My Girl: "My Choice"
"Supernatural"	2024	—	—	Non-album single
"Pinata"	2024	—	—	Pinata
"—" denotes releases that did not chart or were not released in that region.

==== Japanese singles ====
Title	Year	Album
"All I Want Is You"	2019	Non-album singles
"My Lover"	2020	Non-album singles
"Dear My U"	2023	Non-album singles

=== Collaborations ===
List of collaborations, with selected chart positions, sales figures and certifications
Title	Year	Artist(s)	Peak chart positions
Title	Year	Artist(s)	US World
"Tonight"	2016	Jang Won Ki feat. A.C.E (Donghun)	—
"I Feel So Lucky"	2018	Hcue feat. A.C.E	—
"Sincerity"	2019	So feat. A.C.E (Chan)	—
"First Love"	2020	Hong Chang Woo feat. A.C.E (Jun, Donghun, Chan)	—
"Fav Boyz"	2021	A.C.E feat. Steve Aoki and Thutmose	4
"Down"	2021	A.C.E feat. Grey	—
"Hope, Fade Away"	2021	Zeun J feat. A.C.E (Donghun)	—
"Christmas Time"	2021	A.C.E with Son Ho-young and Forestella	—

=== Soundtrack appearances ===
Title	Year	Album
"Maybe" (어쩌면)	2018	My Healing Love OST
"The Beginning" (시작)	2019	Beautiful Love, Wonderful Life OST
"Where You Are"	2020	The Game: Towards Zero OST
"Still Love"	2020	How to Buy a Friend OST
"Show Your Heart" (너를 보여줘)	2020	Welcome OST
"I'm Me"	2020	Twenty-Twenty OST
"Where Are You"	2020	Kairos OST
"Something" (어떻게 할까?)	2021	Sometoon 2021 OST
"Is It Just Me?" (썸썸한 사이?)	2021	Sometoon 2021 OST
"Spark"	2021	Light on Me OST
"Buzzer Beater"	2022	Tracer OST
"Catch Your Attention"	2022	Mimicus OST
"Alone"	2024	Jazz for Two OST

== Filmography ==
=== Dramas ===
Year	Title	Role(s)	Ref.
2017	Hello, My Twenties! 2	As members of idol group The Fifth Column	
2020	Zombie Detective	Dancers; Jun and Chan also played the roles of part-timers at a Gopchang restaurant	

=== Television shows ===
Year	Title	Ref.
2019	Extreme A.C.E	
2019	A.C.E Chuja Island	

== Awards and nominations ==
Year presented, name of the award ceremony, award category and the result of the nomination
Year	Award	Category	Result	Ref.
2017	SBS PopAsia Awards	Rookie of the Year	Won	
2018	StarHub Night of Stars	Best Newcomer Award	Won	
2019	The Fact Music Awards	Rising Star Award	Won	
2019	Soribada Best K-Music Awards	Next Artist Award	Won	
2020	Global GAIA Service Award	World Star Award	Won	
2020	APAN Music Awards	Choice Global Hallyu Star	Won	
