= Park Su-jin (disambiguation) =

Park Su-jin may refer to:

- Park Soo-jin (born 1985), South Korean actress, singer, and model
- Park Soo-jin (singer, born 1995), South Korean singer
- Park Su-jin (born 1999), South Korean swimmer
- Swan (singer) (real name Park Su-jin; born 2003), South Korean singer
