= Bulgasal: Immortal Souls =

2021 South Korean limited television series

- Promotional poster
- Hangul: 불가살
- Hanja: 不可殺
- Lit.: Immortal
- RR: Bulgasal
- MR: Pulgasal
- Genre: Fantasy; Thriller
- Created by: Kim Je-hyeon (tvN); Kim Young-kyu (Studio Dragon)
- Written by: Kwon So-ra; Seo Jae-won
- Directed by: Jang Young-woo
- Creative director: Kim Jae-eun
- Starring: Lee Jin-wook; Kwon Nara; Lee Joon; Gong Seung-yeon; Jung Jin-young; Park Myung-shin; Kim Woo-seok
- Music by: Nam Hye-seung
- Country of origin: South Korea
- Original language: Korean
- No. of episodes: 16

Production
- Executive producers: Joo Jae-hyun; Kang Hee-wook
- Producers: Kim Min-jeong; Jo Yeon-soo; Park Joo-yeon
- Cinematography: Park Se-hee; Kang Yoon-soon
- Editors: Kim Jin-oh; Kim Hye-jin
- Running time: 60 minutes
- Production companies: Studio Dragon; Show Runners
- Budget: ₩40 billion

Original release
- Network: tvN
- Release: December 18, 2021 – February 6, 2022

Bulgasal: Immortal Souls (Korean: 불가살) is a South Korean television series starring Lee Jin-wook, Kwon Nara, Lee Joon, Gong Seung-yeon, Jung Jin-young, Park Myung-shin, and Kim Woo-seok. It is led by director Jang Young-woo, and the screenplay is written by husband-and-wife team Kwon So-ra and Seo Jae-won. It aired on tvN from December 18, 2021 to February 6, 2022. It is also available for streaming on Netflix.

== Synopsis ==
The series tells the story of a woman who remembers her past lives by repeating death and reincarnation for 600 years, and a man who cannot kill nor be killed and has lived for the past 600 years as a Bulgasal—a mythical creature that feeds off human blood and is cursed with immortality.

== Cast ==
=== Main ===
- Lee Jin-wook as Dan Hwal / Bulgasal
  - Lee Joo-won as young Dan Hwal

A man who used to be a human, but becomes an immortal during the Joseon period while working as a military official and carrying out a task to erase the remnants of the previous dynasty.

- Kwon Nara as Min Sang-woon / Kim Hwa-yeon
  - Han Seo-jin as young Min Sang-woon / Min Sang-yeon

A woman who used to be an immortal, but goes through a tragic event that turns her into a human.

- Lee Joon as Ok Eul-tae

Another immortal, commonly known as the "Dark Hole", living in secrecy who enjoys his eternal life, as well as his wealth and power.

- Gong Seung-yeon as Dan Sol / Min Si-ho
1. Dan Sol: Dan Hwal's past wife who is the daughter of a powerful family.
2. Min Si-ho: Dan Sol's reincarnation who is Min Sang-woon's younger sister.
- Jung Jin-young as Dan Geuk / Kwon Ho-yeol
1. Dan Geuk: Dan Sol's father who is a powerful general.
2. Kwon Ho-yeol: Dan Geuk's reincarnation who is a former detective.
- Park Myung-shin as a shaman / Hye-suk
  - Shin Soo-yeon as young Hye-suk
1. A shaman who lived 600 years ago.
2. Hye-suk: the shaman's reincarnation who always helps Dan Hwal.
- Kim Woo-seok as Nam Do-yoon

A high school student who follows Dan Hwal around like a puppy. He works for Ok Eul-tae. He is later revealed to be the reincarnation of Dan Hwal's son.

=== Supporting ===
- Han Dong-kyu as Goo-bong, a resident of a village who lives a rough life due to bulgasal.
- Park Joo-hwan as Dan Ah-chan, Dan Hwal and Dan Sol's son.
- Han Seong-soo as Jo Ma-gu, a ghost with a strong appetite who even devours human corpses.
- Lee Kyu-ho as Du Eok-si-ni
- Oh Yu-jin as Kim Go-bun, Kim Hwa-yeon's younger sister.

=== Special appearances ===
- Lee Jin-hee as Sang Un-mo, Min Sang-woon's mother.
- Kim Tae-baek as Kim Sang-hui's husband

== Production ==
=== Casting ===
The lead role was first offered to Won Bin, but the actor ultimately refused.

On December 17, 2020, it was reported that Lee Jin-wook was being cast for the series and was positively considering his appearance. The actor and director Jang Young-woo previously worked together in the 2020 series Sweet Home. In February 2021, actors Lee Joon, Kwon Nara and Jung Jin-young also received casting offer. Line-up for the lead stars consisting of Lee Jin-wook, Kwon Nara, Lee Joon, Gong Seung-yeon, Jung Jin-young, Park Myung-shin and Kim Woo-seok was finally confirmed on March 17.

=== Release ===
Bulgasal: Immortal Souls was initially scheduled for release in 2022. In November 2021, it was confirmed that the series would premiere on December 18.

== Original soundtrack ==
=== Part 1 ===
Released on December 26, 2021
No.	Title	Lyrics	Music	Artist	Length
1.	"Leave" (하루)	Nam Hye-seung; Park Jin-ho	Nam Hye-seung; Park Jin-ho	4Men	4:51
2.	"Leave" (하루; Inst.)		Nam Hye-seung; Park Jin-ho		4:51
Total length:					9:42

=== Part 2 ===
Released on January 9, 2022
No.	Title	Lyrics	Music	Artist	Length
1.	"Tunnel (with Kardi)" (터널 (with Kardi))	Nam Hye-seung; Janet Suhh	Nam Hye-seung; Jeon Jong-hyuk	Kim Yeji	3:59
2.	"Tunnel (with Kardi)" (터널 (with Kardi); Inst.)		Nam Hye-seung; Jeon Jong-hyuk		3:59
Total length:					7:58

=== Part 3 ===
Released on January 23, 2022
No.	Title	Lyrics	Music	Artist	Length
1.	"Can't Forget You" (잊을 수 없다면))	Nam Hye-seung; Park Jin-ho	Nam Hye-seung; Park Jin-ho	Minseo	3:59
2.	"Can't Forget You" (잊을 수 없다면; Inst.)		Nam Hye-seung; Park Jin-ho		3:59
Total length:					7:58

=== Part 4 ===
Released on February 5, 2022
No.	Title	Lyrics	Music	Artist	Length
1.	"Beyond the Time"	Nam Hye-seung; Janet Suhh	Nam Hye-seung; Jeon Jong-hyeok; Heoseok	Janet Suhh	3:14
2.	"Beyond the Time" (Inst.)		Nam Hye-seung; Jeon Jong-hyeok; Heoseok		3:14
Total length:					6:28

== Viewership ==
Bulgasal: Immortal Souls : South Korea viewers per episode (millions)

Season	Episode number																Average
Season	1	2	3	4	5	6	7	8	9	10	11	12	13	14	15	16	Average
1	1.609	1.481	1.292	1.092	0.883	1.063	1.199	1.142	0.827	1.191	1.036	1.133	0.994	0.969	0.978	1.450	1.146

Source: Audience measurement performed nationwide by Nielsen Korea.

Average TV viewership ratings
Ep.	Original broadcast date	Average audience share (Nielsen Korea)	
Ep.	Original broadcast date	Nationwide	Seoul
1	December 18, 2021	6.346% (1st)	7.390% (1st)
2	December 19, 2021	5.826% (1st)	6.036% (1st)
3	December 25, 2021	4.775% (1st)	4.413% (1st)
4	December 26, 2021	4.128% (1st)	4.301% (1st)
5	January 1, 2022	3.415% (1st)	3.622% (1st)
6	January 2, 2022	4.077% (1st)	4.374% (1st)
7	January 8, 2022	4.455% (1st)	5.062% (1st)
8	January 9, 2022	4.166% (1st)	4.520% (1st)
9	January 15, 2022 (Note: The airing of episode 9 was delayed by 70 minutes due to the live broadcast of a men's football friendly match between South Korea and Iceland.)	3.043% (2nd)	3.383% (2nd)
10	January 16, 2022	4.272% (1st)	4.893% (1st)
11	January 22, 2022	3.679% (1st)	4.073% (1st)
12	January 23, 2022	4.460% (1st)	5.034% (1st)
13	January 29, 2022	3.593% (1st)	3.594% (1st)
14	January 30, 2022	3.664% (1st)	3.825% (1st)
15	February 5, 2022	3.660% (1st)	3.936% (1st)
16	February 6, 2022	5.050% (1st)	5.019% (1st)
Average		4.288%	4.592%
In the table above, the blue numbers represent the lowest ratings and the red numbers represent the highest ratings.; This series aired on a cable channel/pay TV which normally has a relatively smaller audience compared to free-to-air TV/public broadcasters (KBS, SBS, MBC and EBS).
