= 3rd Desire (Reve) =

- Digital cover

EP by Kim Woo-seok
- Released: March 7, 2022
- Recorded: 2022
- Length: 17:57
- Language: Korean
- Labels: TOP Media; Sony Music Korea

Kim Woo-seok chronology
| 2nd Desire (Tasty) (2021) | 3rd Desire (Reve) (2022) | Blank Page (2023) |

Singles from 3rd Desire (Reve)
- 1. "Switch" Released: March 7, 2022

3rd Desire (Reve) is the third extended play by South Korean soloist Kim Woo-seok. It was released on March 7, 2022, under TOP Media. It is available in two versions and contains six tracks, with "Switch" released as the lead single.

== Background ==
In February, it was announced that Kim was working on his third EP. On March 7, 2022, 3rd Desire (Reve) was released along with the lead single "Switch". On March 18, Kim won first place on Music Bank.

== Track listing ==
3rd Desire (Reve) track listing
| No. | Title | Lyrics | Music | Arrangement | Length |
|---|---|---|---|---|---|
| 1. | "Ghostin'" | Kim Woo-seok; CALi (Vendors); Jeong Jae-yeon | Kim Woo-seok; CALi (Vendors); Zenur (Vendors) | Zenur (Vendors) | 3:06 |
| 2. | "Switch" | Kim Woo-seok; CALi (Vendors); Danke (lalala studio); Park Rang (Verygoods); Kang Eun-jung | Kim Woo-seok; CALi (Vendors); Prince (Vendors); Zenur (Vendors); Ronnie Icon | Prince (Vendors); Zenur (Vendors) | 3:23 |
| 3. | "What More Can I Do?" | Kim Woo-seok; CALi (Vendors); Jeong Jae-yeon | Kim Woo-seok; CALi (Vendors); Fascinador (Vendors) | Fascinador (Vendors) | 3:24 |
| 4. | "Shame" | Kim Woo-seok; Jeong Jae-yeon | Kim Woo-seok; YEZI; Fascinador (Vendors); CALi (Vendors); Didrik Thott | YEZI; Fascinador (Vendors) | 3:17 |
| 5. | "When Spring Comes" (살며시 봄이 오면) | Kim Woo-seok; CALi (Vendors); Jeong Jae-yeon | Kim Woo-seok; CALi (Vendors); Jeong Jae-yeon; YEZI | YEZI | 3:56 |
| 6. | "Satisfied" | Kim Woo-seok; CALi (Vendors); Jeong Jae-yeon | Kim Woo-seok; CALi (Vendors); Fascinador (Vendors); Nano (Vendors) | Fascinador (Vendors) | 1:31 |
| Total length: | | | | | 18:40 |

== Charts ==
=== Weekly charts ===
Weekly chart performance for 3rd Desire (Reve)
| Chart (2022) | Peak position |
|---|---|
| South Korean Albums (Gaon) | 3 |

=== Monthly charts ===
Monthly chart performance for 3rd Desire (Reve)
| Chart (2022) | Peak position |
|---|---|
| South Korean Albums (Gaon) | 17 |

=== Singles ===
"Switch" weekly charts
| Chart (2022) | Peak position |
|---|---|
| South Korea Gaon) | 94 |

== Accolades ==
Music program awards
| Song | Program | Network | Date |
|---|---|---|---|
| "Switch" | Music Bank | KBS | March 18, 2022 |

== Release history ==
Release history for 3rd Desire (Reve)
| Region | Date | Format | Label |
|---|---|---|---|
| Various | March 28, 2022 | Digital download; streaming; CD | TOP Media; Sony Music Korea |
