= Mirae (band) =

2021–2024 South Korean boy band

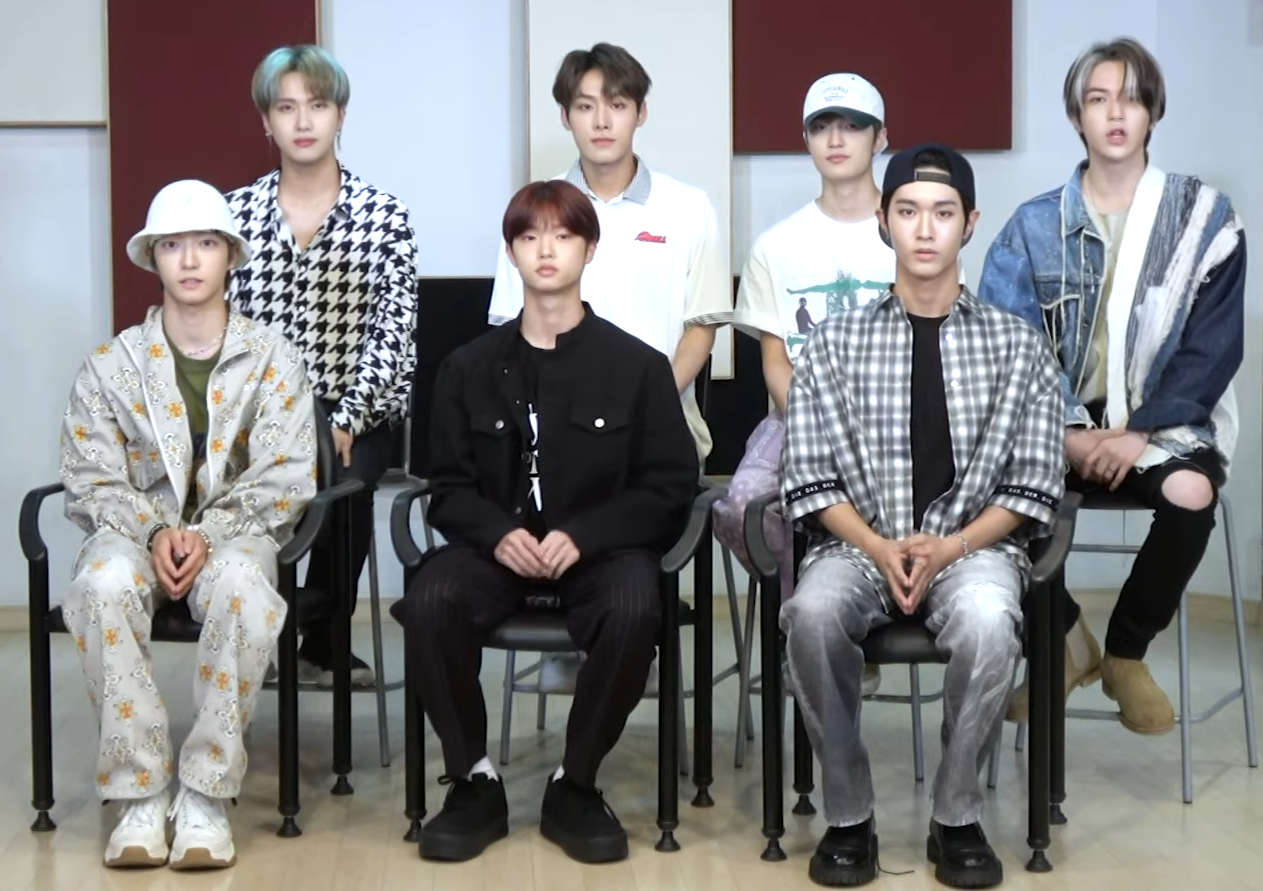
- Mirae in 2021

Background information
- Origin: Seoul, South Korea
- Genre: K-pop
- Years active: 2021–2024
- Label: DSP
- Past members: Lien; Lee Jun-hyuk; Yoo Dou-hyun; Khael; Son Dong-pyo; Park Si-young; Jang Yu-bin
- Website: dspmedia.co.kr/MIRAE

Mirae (Korean: 미래소년; RR: Miraesonyeon; MR: Miraesonyŏn; lit. 'Future Boys'; stylized in all caps), was a South Korean boy band formed in 2021 under DSP Media. The group consisted of seven members: Lien, Lee Jun-hyuk, Yoo Dou-hyun, Khael, Son Dong-pyo, Park Si-young, and Jang Yu-bin. They debuted on March 17, 2021, with the extended play (EP) Killa and officially disbanded on July 9, 2024, with only Son Dong-pyo remaining in the agency. During its career, the group released five extended plays and six singles in Korean and one single in Japanese.

== Name ==
The group is named MIRAE, which means "future". In Korean, 미래소년 means "Future Boys". The logo incorporates the Korean characters that make up the group's name. The name of the group was inspired by their goals of pursuing a new future of K-pop, "Future Boys" means it is a name fitting for a group who will represent and lead the new future of K-Pop. The four consonants, ㅁㄹㅅㄴ, of their group name in Korean designed in a perfect hexagon.

== History ==
=== Pre-debut ===
Prior to the group's debut, members Son Dong-pyo and Lee Jun-hyuk participated on Produce X 101. Son Dong-pyo finished in sixth place, becoming a member of X1 until their disbandment in January 2020. Khael and Park Si-young were former contestants on Under Nineteen.

On January 31, 2020, DSP Media announced the launch of official accounts including Twitter and V Live for their upcoming boy group DSP N.

=== 2021: Debut with Killa and Splash ===
At midnight on February 1, 2021, DSP N announced through their fancafe that they would be known as MIRAE. An official logo motion video was released at the same time, along with the opening of their official SNS accounts.

On February 22, DSP Media announced the group were set to debut. On February 2, Park Si Young was introduced as the group's first member, followed by Lee Jun Hyuk on the 3rd, Lien on the 4th, Son Dong Pyo on the 5th, Jang Yu Bin on the 6th, Khael on the 7th and Yoo Do Hyun on the 8th. A group profile film was released on the 9th.

On March 17, they released their debut extended play Killa.

The following day the group made their debut stage on Mnet's M Countdown. Their debut music video gained more than 10 million views, and the EP sold more than 26,000 copies within the first week of the group's debut, earning them the moniker "2021 Super Rookies".

On August 25, they released their second extended play Splash.

=== 2022–2024: Marvelous, Ourturn, final activities and disbandment ===
On January 12, they released their third extended play Marvelous.

On September 28, they released their fourth extended play Ourturn.

On July 9, 2024, MIRAE had their disbandment announced after three years. All members left the company, except for Son Dong-pyo.

== Former members ==
Adapted from their Naver profile and website profile.

- Lee Junhyuk (이준혁)
- Lien (리안)
- Yoo Dohyun (유도현)
- Khael (카엘)
- Son Dong-pyo (손동표)
- Park Siyoung (박시영)
- Jang Yubin (장유빈)

== Discography ==
=== Extended plays ===
Title	EP details	Peak chart positions		Sales
Title	EP details	KOR	JPN	Sales
Killa	Released: March 17, 2021; Label: DSP Media; Formats: CD, digital download; Track listing: 1. "We Are the Future"; 2. "Killa"; 3. "Higher"; 4. "Swagger"; 5. "Sweet Dreams"; 6. "1 Thing"	9	—	KOR: 30,221
Splash	Released: August 25, 2021; Label: DSP Media; Formats: CD, digital download; Track listing: 1. "Splash"; 2. "Bang-Up"; 3. "New Days"; 4. "Don't Stop"; 5. "# Secret" (비밀); 6. "Sugar"	5	—	KOR: 49,900
Marvelous	Released: January 12, 2022; Label: DSP Media; Formats: CD, digital download; Track listing: 1. "Future Land"; 2. "Marvelous"; 3. "Juice"; 4. "Final Cut"; 5. "Amazing" (소름); 6. "Dear My Friend" (일곱페이지)	4	20	KOR: 49,560; JPN: 2,341
Ourturn	Released: September 28, 2022; Label: DSP Media; Formats: CD, digital download; Track listing: 1. "Drip N' Drop"; 2. "Welcome to the Future"; 3. "Daydreamin'"; 4. "What Are You Doing?"; 5. "Falling Stars"	8	15	KOR: 49,188; JPN: 2,960
Boys Will Be Boys	Released: July 19, 2023; Label: DSP Media; Formats: CD, digital download	12	—	KOR: 33,190
Running Up	Released: February 14, 2024; Label: RBW Japan; Formats: CD, digital download	—	16	JPN: 4,133

=== Singles ===
Title	Year	Peak position	Album
Title	Year	KOR Down.	Album
Korean
"Killa"	2021	—	Killa
"Splash"	2021	—	Splash
"Marvelous"	2022	122	Marvelous
"Drip N' Drop"	2022	174	Ourturn
"Snow Prince"	2022	—	Non-album single
"Jump! "	2023	168	Boys Will Be Boys
Japanese
"Running Up"	2024	—	Running Up
"—" denotes releases that did not chart or were not released in that region.

== Videography ==
=== Music videos ===
Title	Year	Director(s)	Ref.
"Killa"	2021	Kim Ziyong (FANTAZYLAB)	
"Splash"	2021	Zanybros	
"Marvelous"	2022	Zanybros	
"Drip N' Drop"	2022	Zanybros	
"Jump! "	2023	Zanybros	

== Filmography ==
=== Reality shows ===
Year	Title	Network	Note(s)
2021	We Are Future	V Live, YouTube	Mirae based reality shows
2021	KILLA MT	V Live, YouTube	Mirae based reality shows
2021	MIRAE City	YouTube	Mirae based reality shows

== Awards and nominations ==
Name of the award ceremony, year presented, award category, nominee(s) of the award, and the result of the nomination
Award ceremony	Year	Category	Nominee(s)/work(s)	Result	Ref.
Asia Artist Awards	2021	Male Idol Group Popularity Award	"Mirae"	Nominated	
Asia Artist Awards	2021	U+ Idol Live Popularity Award	"Mirae"	Nominated	
Brand of the Year Awards	2021	Rookie Male Idol Award	"Mirae"	Nominated	
Golden Disc Awards	2022	Rookie of the Year Award	"Mirae"	Nominated	
Hanteo Music Awards	2021	Rookie Award – Male Group	"Mirae"	Nominated	
Korea First Brand Awards	2022	Male Rookie Idol Award	"Mirae"	Won	
Mnet Asian Music Awards	2021	Best New Male Artist	"Mirae"	Nominated	
Mnet Asian Music Awards	2021	Artist of the Year	"Mirae"	Nominated	
Mnet Asian Music Awards	2021	Album of the Year	Splash	Nominated	
Mnet Japan Fan's Choice Awards	2021	Male Rookie of the Year	Mirae	Won	
Seoul Music Awards	2022	Rookie of the Year	Mirae	Nominated	
Seoul Music Awards	2022	Popularity Award	Mirae	Nominated	
Seoul Music Awards	2022	K-wave Popularity Award	Mirae	Nominated	
