= 2nd Desire (Tasty) =

- Digital cover

EP by Kim Woo-seok
- Released: February 8, 2021
- Recorded: 2021
- Length: 19:32
- Language: Korean
- Labels: TOP Media; Kakao M

Kim Woo-seok chronology
1st Desire (Greed) (2020)	2nd Desire (Tasty) (2021)	3rd Desire (Reve) (2022)

Singles from 2nd Desire (Tasty)
- 1. "Sugar" Released: February 8, 2021

2nd Desire (Tasty) is the second extended play by South Korean soloist Kim Woo-seok. It was released on February 8, 2021, under TOP Media. It is available in two versions and contains six tracks, with "Sugar" released as the lead single.

== Background ==
On January 18, 2021, it was announced that Kim would make his comeback with a new album in February. On February 8, 2021, Kim released his second extended play 2nd Desire (Tasty) along with the lead single "Sugar". On February 18, 2021, Kim received his first ever music show win on M Countdown.

== Track listing ==
2nd Desire (Tasty) track listing
No.	Title	Lyrics	Music	Arrangement	Length
1.	"Tasty"	Kim Woo-seok; Kevin Leinster Jr. (Vendors); Jeong Jae-yeon	Kim Woo-seok; Kevin Leinster Jr. (Vendors); Zenur (Vendors); xelor; ADN Lewis; Yezi (Vendors); Fascinador (Vendors)	Zenur (Vendors)	3:23
2.	"Sugar"	Kim Woo-seok; Kevin Leinster Jr. (Vendors); Seo Ji-eum; Hwang Yoo-bin; Danke (lalala studio)	Kim Woo-seok; Kevin Leinster Jr. (Vendors); Zenur (Vendors); Fascinador (Vendors); Prince (Vendors)	Zenur (Vendors); Fascinador (Vendors); Prince (Vendors)	3:04
3.	"Better"	Kim Woo-seok; Kevin Leinster Jr. (Vendors); Jeong Jae-yeon	Kim Woo-seok; Kevin Leinster Jr. (Vendors); San (Vendors); Fascinador (Vendors); Prince (Vendors); Shaquille Rayes	Fascinador (Vendors); Prince (Vendors)	3:17
4.	"Holiday"	Kim Woo-seok; Kevin Leinster Jr. (Vendors); De View; Jeong Jae-yeon	Kim Woo-seok; Kevin Leinster Jr. (Vendors); De View	De View	3:22
5.	"What Are You Up to Tonight?" (이따 뭐해)	Lee Min-hyuk	Lee Min-hyuk	Choi Young-hoon	4:07
6.	"Next"	Kim Woo-seok; Kevin Leinster Jr. (Vendors); Jeong Jae-yeon	Kim Woo-seok; Kevin Leinster Jr. (Vendors); Zenur (Vendors); Fascinador (Vendors)	Zenur (Vendors); Fascinador (Vendors)	2:19
Total length:					19:32

== Charts ==
=== Weekly charts ===
Chart (2021)	Peak position
South Korean Albums (Gaon)	1

=== Singles ===
"Sugar" weekly charts
Chart (2021)	Peak position
South Korean Digital Chart (Gaon)	16

== Accolades ==
Music program awards
Song	Program	Network	Date
"Sugar"	M Countdown	Mnet	February 18, 2021
"Sugar"	Music Bank	KBS	February 19, 2021

== Release history ==
Region	Date	Format	Label
Various	February 8, 2021	Digital download; streaming	TOP Media; Kakao M
Various	February 9, 2021	CD	TOP Media; Kakao M
