= Twenty-Twenty (web series) =

2020 South Korean web series

- Promotional poster
- Hangul: 트웬티 트웬티
- RR: Teuwenti teuwenti
- MR: T'ŭwent'i t'ŭwent'i
- Genre: Romantic; Family; Comedy
- Directed by: Han Su-ji
- Starring: Han Sung-min; Kim Woo-seok; Park Sang-nam; Kang Yu-chan; Chae Won-bin; Bae Hae-sun
- Country of origin: South Korea
- Original language: Korean
- No. of episodes: 20

Production
- Producer: Park Tae-won
- Running time: 20-25 minutes
- Production companies: Playlist; Naver TV; YouTube

Original release
- Network: Naver TV
- Release: June 15 – October 21, 2020

Twenty-Twenty (Korean: 트웬티 트웬티) is a romantic-drama South Korean web series, released on Naver TV and Playlist that ran from August 22, 2020 to October 28, 2020. The series stars Han Sung-min and Kim Woo-seok, and attempts to portray the struggles of 20-year-olds regarding dreams and love.

The series is from the production team behind A-Teen, which led the web drama phenomenon.

== Synopsis ==
It depicts the story of 20-year-old Chae Da-hee, who has lived her life according to her mother's wishes, and 20-year-old Lee Hyun-jin, who has become independent, as they meet and grow.

== Cast ==
=== Main Cast ===
- Han Sung-min as Chae Da-hee. She has lived her life in a certain way within the boundaries of her mother.
- Kim Woo-seok as Lee Hyun-jin. His parents prioritized work over family. Hyunjin, was accustomed to being alone. By chance, he meets Da-hee.
- Park Sang-nam as Jeong Ha-joon, Da-hee's friend. He has everything from kindness to consideration.
- Kang Yu-chan as Son Bo-hyun, Hyun-jin's friend
- Chae Won-bin as Baek Ye-eun. She believes in herself. Occasionally, with a sense of justice, takes reckless actions,
- Jin Ho-eun as Kang Dae-geun. He doesn't notice much, but likes his younger siblings and takes good care of them. He wonders about Ha-joon, who doesn't remember himself.
- Bae Hae-sun as Jung Chae-yoon, Da-hee's mother.

== Conference ==
A press conference for the series was held on August 12, 2020, with main cast.

The part that made me nervous was that I hadn't received direct feedback or evaluations from the public yet. I was trembling during the script reading and when we first started shooting. I don't think I'll ever forget that nervousness, but thanks to that, I learned a lot and grew, and I felt proud seeing my improved self. I think I was able to approach the public and my fans with a good project.

— Kim Woo-seok talks about his debut act.
