= Dongpyo =

South Korean singer (born 2002)

Son Dong-pyo
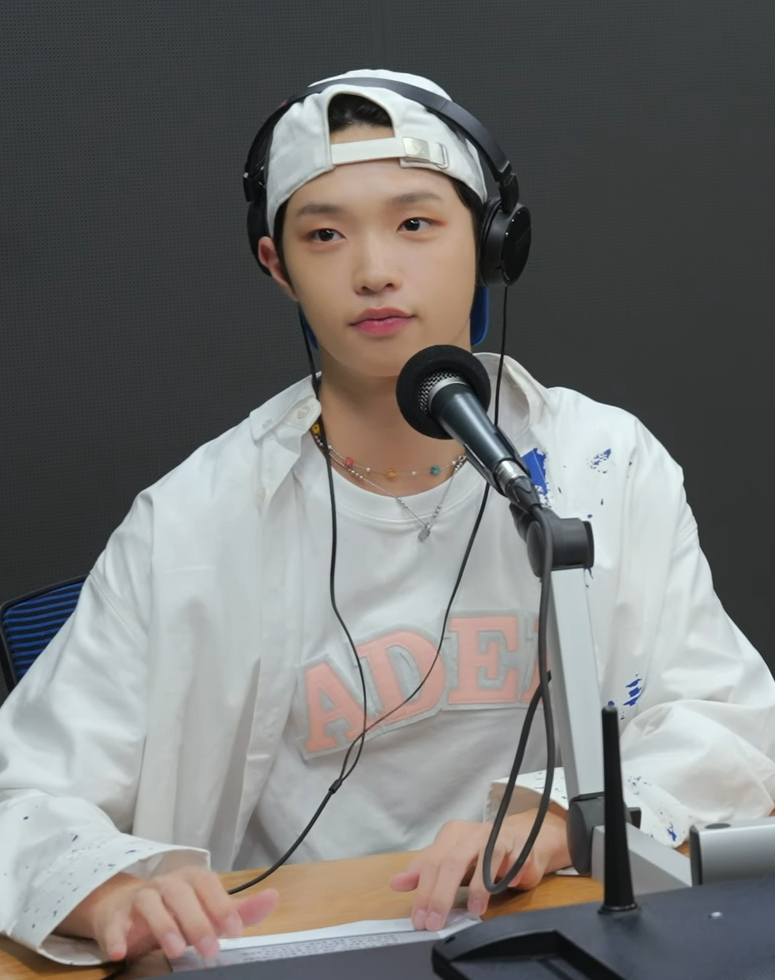
- Son in October 2022
- Born: September 9, 2002 (age 24); Yeongdeok, North Gyeongsang Province, South Korea
- Education: Hanlim Multi Art School
- Occupations: Singer; actor
- Musical career
- Genre: K-pop
- Instrument: Vocals
- Years active: 2019–present
- Label: DSP Media
- Formerly of: X1; Mirae

Korean name
- Hangul: 손동표
- RR: Son Dongpyo
- MR: Son Tongp'yo

Son Dong-pyo (Korean: 손동표; born on September 9, 2002), known mononymously as Dongpyo (동표), is a South Korean singer and actor under DSP Media. He is best known for participating in the reality competition series Produce X 101. He is a former member of the boy groups X1 (2019–2020) and Mirae (2021–2024).

== Early life ==
Son Dong-pyo was born on September 9, 2002, in Yeongdeok, North Gyeongsang Province, South Korea. He was graduated from Hanlim Multi Art School.

== Career ==
=== 2019–2020: Produce X 101 & debut with X1 ===
In 2019, Dongpyo Mnet's survival program Produce X 101 and secured a place in the group X1, which debuted under Swing Entertainment and released their first album in August 2019 . However, the Mnet vote manipulation investigation revealed that the final lineup for the group had been rigged. X1 disbanded shortly thereafter.

=== 2021–present: Debut with Mirae, group's disbandment and solo activities ===
In March 2021, he re-debuted in the kpop group Mirae with the EP Killa.

On July 9, 2024, DSP announced on the global fan community platform Weverse that they decided to disband Mirae's activities where other members left the agency due to contract termination and only he remains. On July 30, Dongpyo was confirmed to appear in teen romance drama Social Savvy Class 101 as Mo Bong-gu, taking on the challenge of acting.

On August 7, 2024, he released the digital single 'Wave (2024)' version. It is a remake of a song released by UN in July 2001, reinterpreted in his own style.

== Discography ==
=== Singles ===
Title	Year	Peak chart positions	Album
Title	Year	KOR Down.	Album
"Wave (2024)"	2024	169	Non-album single

=== Composition credits ===
Year	Artist	Song	Album	Lyrics		Music		Ref.
Year	Artist	Song	Album	Credited	With	Credited	With	
2024	Mirae	"Seven Pages (Dear My Friend)"	Marvelous	Yes	Lee Jun-hyeok, Lian, Yoo Do-hyun, Kael, Park Si-young, Jang Yu-bin, SUN, UNO BUCKX	No	—N/a	

== Filmography ==
=== Web series ===
Year	Title	Role	Ref.
2024	Social Savvy Class 101	Mo Bong-gu	

=== Television shows ===
Year	Title	Role	Ref.
2019	Produce X 101	Contestant	
2023	Thumbnail Battle: The Strongest Hearts		
2023	Neighbourhood Cool House		
2024	Stingy Man Pilot	Guest	

=== Web shows ===
Year	Title	Role	Ref.
2024	As Gen-Z Want 2	Host	

== Awards and nominations ==
Name of the award ceremony, year presented, award category, nominee(s) of the award, and the result of the nomination
Award ceremony	Year	Category	Nominee(s) / Work(s)	Result	Ref.
2023 SBS Entertainment Awards	2023	Rising Star Award	Himself	Won	
