= Park Sang-nam =

South Korean actor (born 1994)

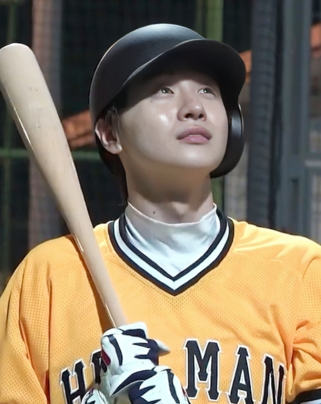
- Park in September 2020
- Born: January 29, 1994 (age 32); South Korea
- Occupation: Actor
- Agent: Mask Studio

Korean name
- Hangul: 박상남
- RR: Bak Sangnam
- MR: Pak Sangnam

Park Sang-nam (Korean: 박상남; born January 29, 1994) is a South Korean actor under Mask Studio.

== Career ==
On May 15, 2018, Park had signed an exclusive contract with SidusHQ.

On February 19, 2024, Mask Studio announced the news of exclusive contracts that included him.

== Filmography ==
=== Film ===
Year	Title	Role	Ref.
2021	I Bet Everything	Cha Ki-sung	
2023	The Roundup: No Way Out		
2024	Daechi-dong Scandal	Ki Haeng	

=== Television series ===
Year	Title	Role	Ref.
2020	Twenty-Twenty	Jeong Ha-joon	
2021	I Bet Everything	Cha Ki-sung	
2023	The Heavenly Idol	Sa Gam-jae	
2024	My Merry Marriage	Goo Dan-soo	

=== Web series ===
Year	Title	Role	Ref.
2018	No Time for Love	Cha Joon-Il	
2019	Stranger Kim	Kim Yo-han	
2021	Don't Swallow It Today, Too	Do Kang-soo	
