= Social Savvy Class 101 =

2024 South Korean television series

- Promotional poster
- Hangul: 0교시는 인싸타임
- Lit.: Zero Period Is Social Butterflies' Time; The 0th Period Is Insider Time
- RR: 0gyosineun inssataim
- MR: 0kyosinŭn inssat'aim
- Genre: Teen drama; Romance
- Written by: Go Yi-chan
- Directed by: Bae Ha-neul
- Starring: Kim Woo-seok; Kang Na-eon; Choi Gun; Son Dong-pyo; Han Chae-rin
- Country of origin: South Korea
- Original language: Korean
- No. of episodes: 8

Production
- Running time: 20-31 minutes
- Production company: Studio V Plus

Original release
- Network: Cinema Heaven
- Release: November 10 – November 17, 2024

Social Savvy Class 101 (Korean: 0교시는 인싸타임) is a 2024 South Korean teen romance television series starring Kim Woo-seok, Kang Na-eon, Choi Gun, Son Dong-pyo, and Han Chae-rin. It aired on Cinema Heaven from November 10 to 17, 2024. It is also available for streaming on Netflix, Wavve, TVING, Watcha in South Korea, Abema in Japan, and Viki starting December 1 in selected regions.

== Cast and characters ==
=== Main ===
- Kim Woo-seok as Kang Woo-bin

A boy who disguised himself as a trainee in order to be popular.

- Kang Na-eon as Kim Ji-eun

A girl who aspired to be popular by making a deal with Woo-bin to be her fake boyfriend in order to gain attention from others.

- Choi Gun as Lee Dong-min

A secret idol trainee who enters a new school meets Ji-eun, his childhood friend.

- Son Dong-pyo as Mo Bong-gu

A non-stop chatter student.

- Han Chae-rin as Min Seok-hee

The class president.

=== Special appearances ===
- Lee Jin-woo as Kim Soo-hwan

== Production ==
=== Development ===
Cinema Heaven teen romance series Social Savvy Class 101 was written by Go Yi-chan, directed by Bae Ha-neul, and planned and produced by Studio V Plus.

=== Casting ===
On July 25, 2024, it was reported that Kim Woo-seok had confirmed to appear in the series. On July 28, Kang Na-eon announced that she had been cast in the series. On June 29, it was reported that Choi Gun had been cast as the lead in the series. According to Joy News 24 on July 30, Son Dong-pyo had confirmed his appearance in the series. On October 8, it was reported that Kim, Kang, Choi, Son, and Han Chae-rin had been confirmed to appear in the series.

=== Filming ===
According to Joy News 24 on August 16, 2024, the series had finished all its filming on August 15.

== Release ==
Social Savvy Class 101 was scheduled to premiere on Cinema Heaven in November 2024. Originally, the series was scheduled to release in October 2024.

== Original soundtrack ==
=== Part 1 ===
Released on October 26, 2024
No.	Title	Lyrics	Music	Artist	Length
1.	"Hello"	Jeong Chang-wook; Min Yeon-jae	Jeong	Kim Woo-seok	3:44
2.	"Hello" (Inst.)		Jeong		3:44
Total length:					7:28

=== Part 2 ===
Released on November 9, 2024
No.	Title	Lyrics	Music	Artist	Length
1.	"Timeout"	Jeong Chang-wook	Jeong	Aimers	2:27
2.	"Timeout" (Inst.)		Jeong		2:27
3.	"Love Is So Sweet"	Lee Jong-soo; Landscape	Lee; Landscape	Kang Na-eon	3:10
4.	"Love Is So Sweet" (Inst.)		Lee; Landscape		3:10
Total length:					11:00

=== Part 3 ===
Released on November 10, 2024
No.	Title	Lyrics	Music	Artist	Length
1.	"I Feel You"	Lee Jong-soo; Landscape	Lee; Landscape	Felic	3:14
2.	"I Feel You" (Inst.)		Lee; Landscape		3:14
Total length:					6:28

=== Part 4 ===
Released on November 13, 2024
No.	Title	Lyrics	Music	Artist	Length
1.	"You're My Dream Come True"	Lee Jong-soo; Na Ji-yoon	Lee; Na	So Hyun	3:40
2.	"You're My Dream Come True" (Inst.)		Lee; Na		3:40
Total length:					7:20

=== Part 5 ===
Released on November 16, 2024
No.	Title	Lyrics	Music	Artist	Length
1.	"Close To You"	Lee Jong-soo; Landscape	Lee; Landscape	Joo Yeah-in	3:52
2.	"Close To You" (Inst.)		Lee; Landscape		3:52
Total length:					7:44

=== Part 6 ===
Released on November 17, 2024
No.	Title	Lyrics	Music	Artist	Length
1.	"Waiting For You"	Lee Jong-soo; Landscape	Lee; Landscape	Cheon Ji-won	4:45
2.	"Waiting For You" (Inst.)		Lee; Landscape		4:45
3.	"Awakening"	Jeff Kim; HANYE; BrownChord; 30billion	Kim; HANYE; BrownChord; 30billion	Seung Cha-rin	3:20
4.	"Awakening" (Inst.)		Kim; HANYE; BrownChord; 30billion		3:20
Total length:					15:10
