= Kang Na-eon =

South Korean actress (born 2001)

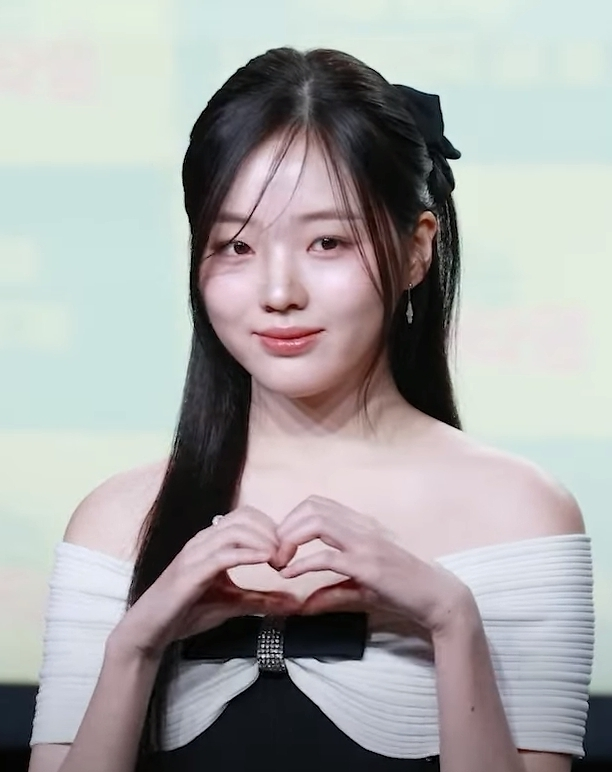
- Kang in October 2024
- Born: April 15, 2001 (age 25); South Korea
- Education: Korea National University of Arts
- Occupation: Actress
- Years active: 2022–present
- Agents: K1 Entertainment; Enter Seven

Korean name
- Hangul: 강나언
- RR: Gang Naeon
- MR: Kang Naŏn

Kang Na-eon (Korean: 강나언; born April 15, 2001) is a South Korean actress under Enter Seven. She made her acting debut in Blind (2022). She is best known in Crash Course in Romance (2023) and Pyramid Game (2024).

== Early life ==
Kang was born on April 15, 2001, in South Korea. Her older brother is Kang Dong-hyun who is also an actor. She attended Korea National University of Arts. She lived in Germany when she was a child.

== Career ==
She debuted as an actress in the tvN drama Blind (2022) and gained recognition in Crash Course in Romance (2023).

On May 31, 2022, Kang signed an exclusive contract with K1 Entertainment.

According to Enter Seven on April 12, 2024, Kang was selected as a curry commercial model.

== Personal life ==
On October 25, 2024, it was revealed that Kang is dating actor and singer Kim Woo-seok. They became a couple after the filming of Social Savvy Class 101 ended.

== Filmography ==
=== Television series ===
Key
†	Denotes television productions that have not yet been released

Year	Title	Role	Notes	Ref.
2022	Blind	Kwon Yoo-na	Debut acting	
2023	Crash Course in Romance	Bang Soo-ah		
2023	Tale of the Nine Tailed 1938	Guk Hee		
2023	KBS Drama Special: "Anyone Anywhere"	Kang Min-joo	Season 14	
2024	Wedding Impossible	Yoo Jong-hee		
2024	Pyramid Game	Im Ye-rim		
2024	Social Savvy Class 101	Kim Ji-eun		
2025	Mary Kills People	Woo-mi		
2025	tvN X TVING Short Drama Curation 2025: "Housekeeper"	Han Mi-jin	one-act drama	
2025	Taxi Driver 3	young Kang Ju-ri		
2026	Doctor Shin	Tae Ye-jeong		
2026	One-of-a-Kind Romance †	Ju Da-hong		

=== Music video appearances ===
Year	Song title	Artist	Ref.
2024	"Don't Cry"	Jo Byeong-kyu	
