= Kang Yu-chan =

South Korean singer and actor (born 1997)

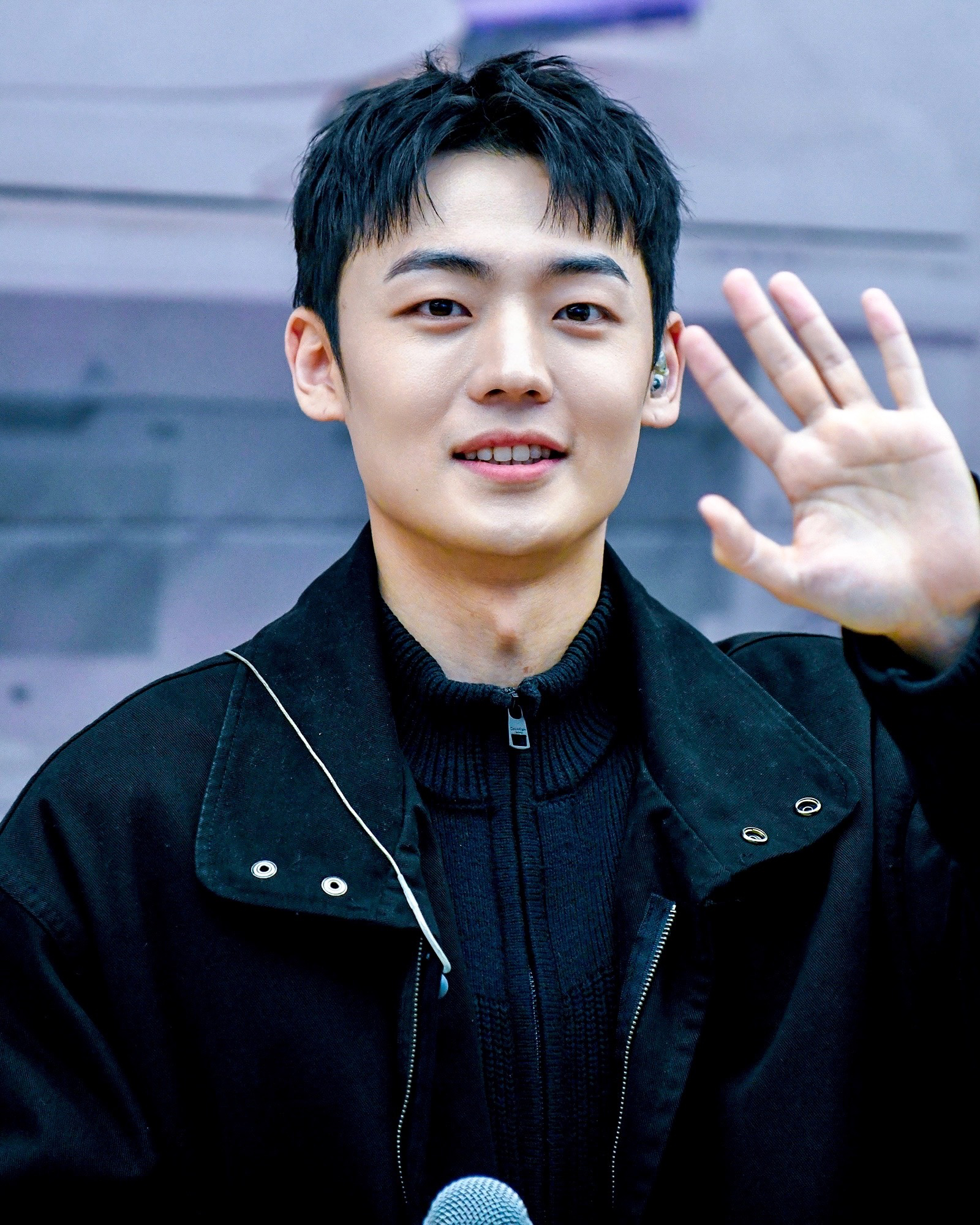
- Kang in February 2024
- Born: December 31, 1997 (age 28); Jeju Province, South Korea
- Other name: Chan (formerly until 2023)
- Occupations: Singer; actor
- Years active: 2017–present
- Musical career
- Genre: K-pop
- Years active: 2017–present
- Labels: Beat Interactive; Swing; Way Better
- Member of: A.C.E
- Formerly of: UNB

Korean name
- Hangul: 강유찬
- RR: Gang Yuchan
- MR: Kang Yuch'an

Kang Yu-chan (Korean: 강유찬; born December 31, 1997), formerly known as Chan (Korean: 찬) is a South Korean singer and actor. He debuted as a member of A.C.E in 2017. In the same year, he joined the survival program The Unit, in which he finished in ninth place and became a member of the project group UNB. As an actor, he gained recognition by playing the role of Son Bohyun in the web series Twenty-Twenty. He made his musical debut in 2025 in The Anarchist and is currently a solo artist, actor and musical actor.

== Career ==
=== Pre-debut ===
Kang Yu-chan was a former JYP Entertainment trainee before joining Beat Interactive. He appeared along with Bang Chan in Twice's debut MV as a zombie.

Before joining JYP he used to be in a breakdance crew named Valentine Crew in highschool winning multiple competitions. He later joined Alive87 crew under the dance name AkaBuggy in which he specialized in popping. He was in a lot of dance competitions like Street Fighter Vol.2, Defender 16 and Cipher vol4.

=== 2017–2024: Debut with A.C.E and UNB ===
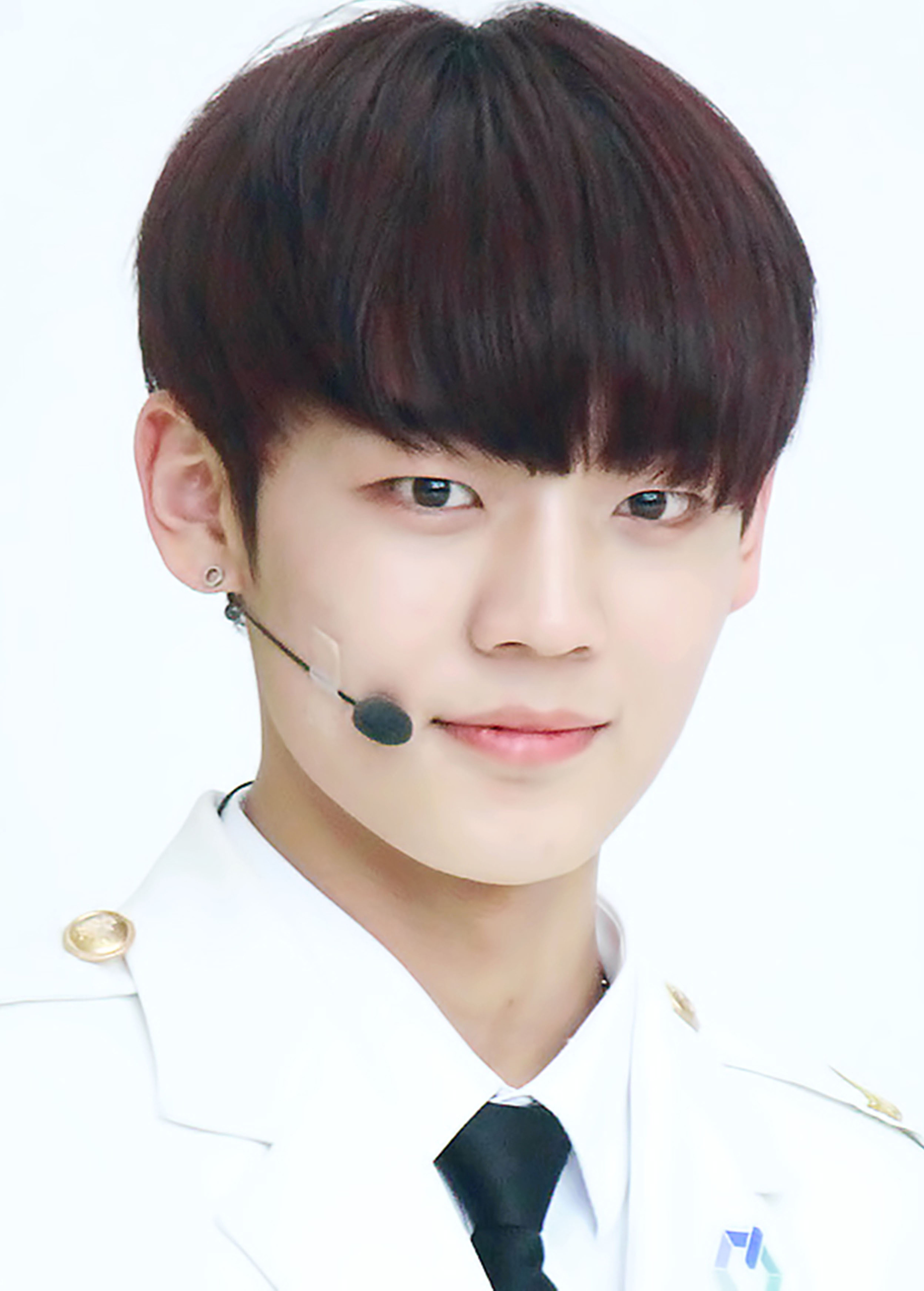
Kang in February 2018

Kang debuted as a member of A.C.E on May 23, 2017, with the single "Cactus". In the same year, he participated in the survival show The Unit: Idol Rebooting Project alongside fellow A.C.E member Jun. On February 10, 2018, Kang placed 9th with a total of 74,367 votes in the final episode thus making him included in final group lineup. On April 7, 2018, he officially debuted as a member of UNB with the release of their first EP, Boyhood. On November 5, 2018, he sang "Maybe" for the South Korean television drama My Healing Love with Kim Byeong-kwan. Since then, he has featured on several soundtracks for television dramas such as The Game: Towards Zero, Beautiful Love, Wonderful Life, Welcome etc.

In March 2020, Kang joined the main cast of the web series Twenty-Twenty where he played Son Bo-hyun. His performance in the series was well-received, earning him increased recognition.

In 2022, Kang portrayed the role of Bang Yu-chan in Playlist's web drama series Mimicus.

On August 16, 2022, Kang enlisted for his military service as an active duty soldier. He returned to his entertainment career on February 15, 2024.

In May 2024, Kang appeared on King of the Masked Singer as a contestant. He revealed on the show that he had been approached to appear while he was enlisted in Military Band.

In August 2024, it was announced that Kang had a main role in the drama Timetable as Hong Yeon, a restaurant owner who helps the dead move on to the next life without regrets. He also recorded and released the song 'tell me you love me again' for the soundtrack.

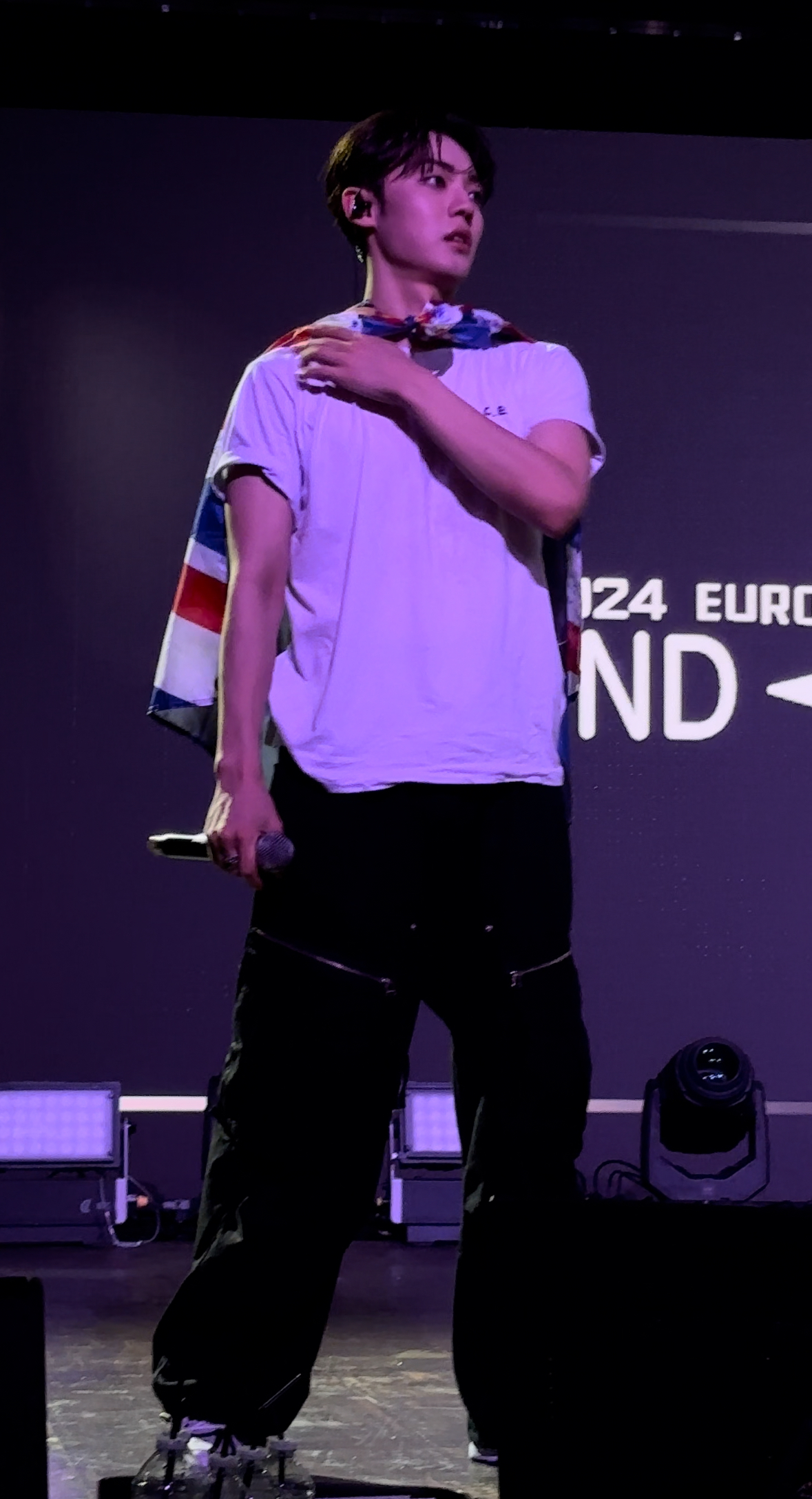
Kang during A.C.E's 2024 Europe Tour "Rewind Us"

=== 2025-present: Stage acting debut, departure from Beat Interactive, joining Way Better and solo career ===
In January 2025, Kang made his stage acting debut in the musical "The Anarchist". He played Muhyuk one of three main characters, all of whom were the only people on stage for the whole duration of the play. The Anarchist is a musical work that depicts the life, dreams, and anguish of the three revolutionary men who are ready to throw everything for the independence of the country, Muhyuk, Deokhyung, and Jakyung. All seats for Kang's debut performance sold out on the first day of release. At the same time, 'Anarchist' won the first place in the daily and weekly advance ranking of the musical category in the ticket link, proving popular. The musical ran from January to March 2025.

In March 2025, it was announced that all five members of A.C.E did not renew their contracts with label Beat Interactive, however the members would be keeping their trademarks and rights to the band for potential future projects.

On April 7, the label 'Way Better' announced the signing of an exclusive contract with Kang and said, "I ask for a lot of interest and support for Kang Yuchan, who is about to make a new beginning"

On April 15, it was announced that Kang had been cast in the musical "Do Not Disturb" as a lead actor. A musical based on a web novel of the same name. It portrays the complicated relationships of characters and the odd events that await whoever enters that mysterious hotel isolated from the outside world: the Hotel Erebeos, where only members are allowed entry. The place that promises their guests to fulfill their most cherished desires. Kang played Jess Blake, a traumatised young artist who enters the Erebos Hotel with a membership he inherited from his mother, and falls in love with a mysterious man, leaving his painting task in oblivion. The musical runs from June to August 2025.

== Discography ==
=== Extended plays ===
Title	Album details	Peak chart positions	Sales
Title	Album details	KOR	Sales
Rebel	Released: October 21, 2025; Label: Way Better; Formats: CD, digital download	27	KOR: +9,461

=== Singles ===
Title	Year	Album
"Champagne Poppin'"	2025	Non-album single
"Close to You"	2025	Rebel

=== Soundtrack appearances ===
Title	Year	Album
"Maybe" (어쩌면) (with Kim Byeong-kwan)	2018	My Healing Love OST Part. 2
"The Beginning" (시작) (with Kim Byeong-kwan)	2019	Beautiful Love, Wonderful Life OST Part.4
"Where You Are" (with Jun)	2020	The Game: Towards Zero OST Part. 1
"Still Love" (with Kim Byeong-kwan)	2020	How to Buy a Friend OST Part. 5
"Show Your Heart" (너를 보여줘)	2020	Welcome OST Part. 11
"Something" (어떻게 할까?) (with A.C.E)	2021	Sometoon 2021 OST
"Is It Just Me?" (썸썸한 사이?) (with Jun and Donghun)	2021	Sometoon 2021 OST
"Spark" (with A.C.E)	2021	Light on Me OST
"Buzzer Beater" (with Jun and Kim Byeong-kwan)	2022	Tracer OST
"Catch Your Attention"	2022	Mimicus OST
"Tell Me You Love Me Again" (다시 사랑한다고 말해줘)	2024	Timetable OST

== Filmography ==
=== Web series ===
Year	Title	Role	Notes	Ref.
2020	Twenty-Twenty	Son Bo-hyun	Main role	
2020	Pop Out Boy!	Son Bo-hyun	Cameo (Ep. 8)	
2021	Re-Feel: If Only	Son Bo-hyun	Cameo (Ep. 4)	
2021	Sometoon 2021	Jungwoo, Hun	Main role	
2022	Mimicus	Bang Yu-chan	Supporting role	
2024	Timetable	Hong Yeon	Main role	

=== Television series ===
Year	Title	Role	Notes	Ref.
2017	Hello, My Twenties! 2		Cameo (Ep. 4)	
2018	Marry Me Now	VIP Customer	Cameo (Ep. 17-18)	
2020	Zombie Detective	Part-timer		

=== Television shows ===
Year	Title	Role	Notes	Ref.
2017	The Unit: Idol Rebooting Project	Contestant	Finished 9th	
2020	Idol Wonderland	Main host	with Lee Gi-kwang	
2024	King of the Masked Singer	Contestant		

=== Stage shows ===
Year	Title	Role	Notes	Ref.
2025	The Anarchist	Muhyuk	Main Role	
2025	Do Not Disturb	Jess Blake	Main Role	
