= The Game: Towards Zero =

2020 South Korean television series

- Promotional poster
- Hangul: 더 게임: 0시를 향하여
- RR: Deo geim: 0sireul hyanghayeo
- MR: Tŏ keim: 0sirŭl hyanghayŏ
- Genre: Mystery; Crime
- Written by: Lee Ji-hyo
- Directed by: Jang Joon-ho
- Starring: Ok Taec-yeon; Lee Yeon-hee; Lim Ju-hwan
- Music by: Jeong Se-rin
- Country of origin: South Korea
- Original language: Korean
- No. of episodes: 32 (Note: In order to circumvent Korean laws that prevent commercial breaks in the middle of an episode, what would previously have been aired as single 70 minute episodes are now being repackaged as two 35 minute episodes, with two episodes being shown each night with a commercial break between the two.)

Production
- Camera setup: Single-camera
- Running time: 35 minutes
- Production companies: Mong-jak-so Co., Ltd.

Original release
- Network: MBC TV
- Release: January 22 – March 12, 2020

The Game: Towards Zero (Korean: 더 게임: 0시를 향하여) is a 2020 South Korean television series starring Ok Taec-yeon, Lee Yeon-hee and Lim Ju-hwan. It aired on MBC TV from January 22 to March 12, 2020.

== Synopsis ==
Tae-Pyeong (Ok Taec-yeon) has a prophet like ability. When he looks into someone's eyes, he can see the exact moment when they die. Tae-Pyeong lives in a mansion with Teacher Baek (Jung Dong-hwan) and Attorney Lee Yeon-Hwa (Ryu Hye-rin).

A girl is kidnapped and her disappearance may involve the notorious Midnight Killer. While Tae-Pyeong helps the police with the investigation, he is stunned when he meets Detective Joon-Young (Lee Yeon-hee). She is the first person whose death he cannot foresee. Tae-Pyeong and Detective Joon-Young frantically work together to stop the Midnight Killer.

== Cast ==
=== Main ===
- Ok Taec-yeon as Kim Tae-pyeong

A prophet who can foresee anyone's death just by looking into their eyes. This changes when he meets Joon-yeong whose death he cannot see.

- Lee Yeon-hee as Seo Joon-yeong
  - Joo Ye-rim as Young Seo Joon-yeong

A detective who works at Yongsan Police Station. She partners with a prophet to solve a mysterious murder case.

- Lim Ju-hwan as Gu Do-kyung

A forensic expert. He is a perfectionist who digs through every case.

=== Supporting ===
- Park Ji-il as Nam Woo-hyeon
- Choi Jae-woong as Han Dong-woo
- Shin Sung-min as Yoon Kang-jae
- Lee Seung-woo as Go Bong-soo
- Lee Bom as Ji Soo-hyeon
- Park Won-sang as Lee Joon-hee
- Yoo Se-hyung as Sung Min-jae
- Hong In as Park Han-gyoo
- Yoon Ji-won as Oh Ye-ji
- Jung Dong-hwan as Teacher Baek
- Ryu Hye-rin as Lee Yeon-hwa
- Jang So-yeon as Yoo Ji-won
- Choi Da-in as Lee Mi-jin
- Kim Yong-joon as Jo Pil-doo
- Ye Soo-jung as Mrs. Jeong
- Yang Hyeong-min as Oh Seong-min
- Kim Hak-sun as Seo Dong-cheol

=== Special appearances ===
- Jang Gwang as Retired medical examiner (Ep.17-18)

== Original soundtrack ==
The Game : Towards Zero OST

Soundtrack album by Various Artists
- Released: 2020
- Genre: Soundtrack
- Languages: Korean; English
- Labels: Dreamus, Donuts Music And

=== Part 1 ===
Released on January 23, 2020
No.	Title	Lyrics	Music	Artist	Length
1.	"Where You Are"	Nuvocity	Nuvocity	A.C.E (Note: Performed by A.C.E members Jun and Chan.)	3:33
2.	"Where You Are" (Inst.)		Nuvocity		3:33
Total length:					7:06

=== Part 2 ===
Released on February 5, 2020
No.	Title	Lyrics	Music	Artist	Length
1.	"My Heart Is Yours" (내맘이 그대맘에)	Gentile Division (이방원사단) · Lee An	Gentile Division (이방원사단) · Lee An	Hickee	3:53
2.	"My Heart Is Yours" (Inst.)		Gentile Division (이방원사단) · Lee An		3:53
Total length:					7:46

=== Part 3 ===
Released on February 12, 2020
No.	Title	Lyrics	Music	Artist	Length
1.	"Tunnel" (터널)	Shoulder Thug (어깨깡패)	Shoulder Thug (어깨깡패)	Harryan	4:05
2.	"Tunnel" (Inst.)		Shoulder Thug (어깨깡패)		4:05
Total length:					8:10

=== Part 4 ===
Released on February 19, 2020
No.	Title	Lyrics	Music	Artist	Length
1.	"Day Always Come On Time"	Gogang	Gogang · Choi Young-hoon	Gogang	3:13
2.	"Day Always Come On Time" (Inst.)		Gogang · Choi Young-hoon		3:13
Total length:					6:26

=== Part 5 ===
Released on February 26, 2020
No.	Title	Lyrics	Music	Artist	Length
1.	"A Day" (하루)	Jung Young-ah	Gentile Division (이방원사단) · Lee An	Floody	3:58
2.	"A Day" (Inst.)		Gentile Division (이방원사단) · Lee An		3:58
Total length:					7:56

=== Part 6 ===
Released on March 4, 2020
No.	Title	Lyrics	Music	Artist	Length
1.	"Love Poem" (그 사랑)	Jo Yu-ma	Jo Yu-ma · Jung Jae-pil	Yoonsoan	4:22
2.	"Love Poem" (Inst.)		Jo Yu-ma · Jung Jae-pil		4:20
Total length:					8:42

== Production ==
Ok Taec-yeon and Lee Yeon-hee previously starred together in Marriage Blue (2013).

== Ratings ==
In this table, the blue numbers represent the lowest ratings and the red numbers represent the highest ratings.

Ep.	Broadcast date	Title	
Ep.	Broadcast date	Title	Nielsen Korea (Nationwide)
1	January 22, 2020	Tae Pyung and Joon Young's First Encounter	2.7%
2	January 22, 2020	Mi Jin's Eyes	3.8%
3	January 23, 2020	Tae Pyung Tells the Truth	2.5%
4	January 23, 2020	Mi Jin's Location	3.7%
5	January 29, 2020	A Miracle	3.1%
6	January 29, 2020	Tae Pyung's Concern	4.2%
7	January 30, 2020	Do Kyung's Past	3.3%
8	January 30, 2020	Warning From a Murderer	4.5%
9	February 5, 2020	Tae Pyung's Old Memory	3.2%
10	February 5, 2020	Do Kyung is Arrested	4.6%
11	February 6, 2020	Ill-Fated Relationship	3.2%
12	February 6, 2020	Who Is the Real Culprit?	3.8%
13	February 12, 2020	Do Kyung's Grief of Losing His Father	2.8%
14	February 12, 2020	Woo Hyun Apologizing to Do Kyung	4.0%
15	February 13, 2020	Hyun Woo's Basement	3.0%
16	February 13, 2020	Hyun Woo's Tracking Device	4.5%
17	February 19, 2020	Seong Woon's Death	2.5%
18	February 19, 2020	Is It Homicide or Suicide?	3.4%
19	February 20, 2020	Woo Hyun's Confession	3.2%
20	February 20, 2020	Dong Chul's Death Anniversary	3.7%
21	February 26, 2020	Turn Yourself In	2.6%
22	February 26, 2020	Looking for Jun Hee And Hyung Soo	3.8%
23	February 27, 2020	Sorry for Leaving You Alone	3.2%
24	February 27, 2020	The Funeral	3.9%
25	March 4, 2020	The Letter	3.0%
26	March 4, 2020	Catch the Bombmaker	4.0%
27	March 5, 2020	Tae Pyung Can't See Jun Hee's Death	3.3%
28	March 5, 2020	Joon Young's Plan to Find Hyun Woo	3.4%
29	March 11, 2020	Hyun Woo's Changed Plan	2.8%
30	March 11, 2020	Tae Pyung's Choice	3.9%
31	March 12, 2020	A Refrigerator Truck	2.9%
32	March 12, 2020	Tae Pyung Can See Joon Young's Death	3.5%
Average			3.4%

== Awards and nominations ==
Year	Award	Category	Recipient	Result
2020	39th MBC Drama Awards	Top Excellence Award, Actor in a Wednesday-Thursday Miniseries	Ok Taec-yeon	Nominated
2020	39th MBC Drama Awards	Top Excellence Award, Actress in a Wednesday-Thursday Miniseries	Lee Yeon-hee	Nominated
2020	39th MBC Drama Awards	Excellence Award, Actor in a Wednesday-Thursday Miniseries	Lim Ju-hwan (Note: Lim won the award for his roles in The Game: Towards Zero and The Spies Who Loved Me.)	Won
