= Cactus (A.C.E song) =

Single by A.C.E
- Released: May 23, 2017
- Genre: K-Pop, Hardstyle
- Length: 6:42
- Label: Beat Interactive; Sony Music
- Composer(s): Nassun, EJ Show, BIGTONE
- Lyricist(s): Nassun
- Producer(s): EJ Show; BIGTONE

A.C.E singles chronology
| "Cactus" (2017) | "Callin'" (2017) |

Music video
- "Cactus" on YouTube

"Cactus" (Hangul: 선인장; RR: seon-injang) is the debut single by South Korean boy group A.C.E. It was released on May 23, 2017, by Beat Interactive and distributed by Sony Music. In order to promote the single, the group performed on several South Korean music programs, including Music Bank and Show! Music Core. A music video for the song was also released on May 23.

The single album peaked at number 24 on the Gaon Album Chart.

== Release ==
"Cactus" was released as a digital single and as a physical single album on May 23, 2017.

== Promotion ==
The group held their debut stage on SBS MTV's The Show on May 23, 2017, performing the single. They continued on MBC Music's Show Champion on May 24, Mnet's M Countdown on May 25, KBS's Music Bank on May 26, MBC's Show! Music Core on May 27 and SBS's Inkigayo on May 28.

A dance practice video for the song was released on May 28, 2017.

== Music video ==
A 15-seconds music video teaser was revealed on May 21, 2017, through their official YouTube channel. The official music video was released on May 23, 2017, and has accumulated more than 6 million views since its release.

== Chart performance ==
"Cactus" entered and peaked at number 24 on the Gaon Album Chart on the chart issue dated May 21–27, 2017, for physicals sales. In its second week, the single album charted at number 93.

The single album entered at number 88 on the Gaon Album Chart for the month of May 2017, for 900 physical copies sold.

== Track listing ==
Digital download

| No. | Title | Lyrics | Music | Arrangement | Length |
|---|---|---|---|---|---|
| 1. | "Cactus" (선인장) | Nassun | EJ Show; BIGTONE | EJ Show | 3:21 |
| 2. | "Cactus" (Instrumental) | | EJ Show; BIGTONE | EJ Show | 3:21 |
| Total length: | | | | | 6:42 |

== Charts ==
=== Weekly charts ===
| Chart (2017) | Peak position |
|---|---|
| South Korea (Gaon Album Chart) | 24 |

== Release history ==
| Region | Date | Format | Label |
|---|---|---|---|
| South Korea | May 23, 2017 | CD, Digital download | Beat Interactive, Sony Music |
| Worldwide | May 23, 2017 | Digital download | Beat Interactive, Sony Music |
