= Light on Me =

2021 South Korean television series

- Promotional poster
- Hangul: 새빛남고 학생회
- Lit.: Saebit Boys' High School Student Council
- RR: Saebinnamgo haksaenghoe
- MR: Saebinnamgo haksaenghoe
- Genre: Teen romance; Coming-of-age
- Based on: Light on Me by DAY7
- Written by: Lee Ji-eum
- Directed by: Lee Yoo-yeon
- Starring: Lee Sae-on; Kang You-seok; Choe Chan-yi; Go Woo-jin
- Ending theme: "SPARK" by A.C.E; "FEVER" by MOOK
- Country of origin: South Korea
- Original language: Korean
- No. of episodes: 16

Production
- Camera setup: Single camera
- Running time: 18-30 minutes
- Production company: WHYNOT MEDIA

Original release
- Network: KokTV; WATCHA; Viki; WeTV; AbemaTV
- Release: June 29 – August 19, 2021

Light on Me (Korean: 새빛남고 학생회; RR: Saebinnamgo haksaenghoe; lit. 'Saebit Boys' High School Student Council') is a 2021 South Korean streaming television BL series starring Lee Sae-on, Kang Yoo-seok, Choe Chan-yi and Go Woo-jin. Based on the boys' love dating sim mobile game of the same name by DAY7, the series was released on Tuesdays and Thursdays from June 29 to August 19, 2021 on the WATCHA app in South Korea, and on the video streaming website Viki in western countries.

It was featured on Teen Vogue's best BL dramas of 2021 list. In March 2026 a second season was included in WHYNOT MEDIA's WelCon page, suggesting it might be officially announced soon.

== Synopsis ==
Woo Tae-kyung is an 18-year-old Korean average boy who has no friends. One day, his teacher approaches him in order to help him. He suggests Tae-kyung join the school's student council. The task is not easy, since one of the members is Noh Shin-woo, who resents him for a previous encounter. The president of the council, though, is very receptive, and tries to make Tae-kyung and Shin-woo get along. The council is also formed by Namgoong Shi-won, an extroverted humorous guy who also makes an effort so Tae-kyung properly joins them. Tae-kyung, with his new set of friends, proceeds to enjoy his new social life, and starts questioning if he may or may not like one of his fellow council members.

== Cast ==
=== Main ===
- Lee Sae-on as Woo Tae-kyung
- Kang You-seok as Noh Shin-woo
- Choe Chan-yi as Shin Da-on
- Go Woo-jin as Namgoong Shi-won

=== Supporting ===
- Lee Ki-hyun as Seo Haet-bit
- Yang Seo-hyun as Lee Soo-hee

== Original soundtrack ==
The soundtrack for the series was released by Music&New on August 20, 2021.

Light on Me (Original Television Soundtrack)
No.	Title	Lyrics	Music	Artist	Length
1.	"SPARK"	Kim Ho-kyung	1601	A.C.E	3:47
2.	"FEVER"	Kim Ho-kyung	1601	MOOK	3:48
3.	"Sprightly"		Kim Jung-ju, Kim Jae-rim, Chung Seung-hyun, Park Tae-hyeon		2:38
4.	"An unexpected Situation"		Kim Jung-ju, Kim Jae-rim		2:18
5.	"Fluttering heart" (살랑이는 마음)		Na Hyun-ju, Chung Seung-hyun, Park Tae-hyeon		2:17
6.	"My first love story" (나의 첫사랑 이야기)		Na Hyun-ju, Chung Seung-hyun, Park Tae-hyeon		3:46
7.	"Moment"		Chung Seung-hyun, Na Hyun-ju		2:06
8.	"Messy boys" (골 때리는 녀석들)		Chung Seung-hyun, Na Hyun-ju		2:16
9.	"YOU"		Shin Hyung-bo		2:24
10.	"Pit-a-pat" (두근두근 내 마음)		Na Hyun-ju, Chung Seung-hyun, Park Tae-hyeon		2:06
11.	"Stealthily"		Kim Jung-ju, Kim Jae-rim		1:45
12.	"Band" (반창고)		Na Hyun-ju, Chung Seung-hyun, Park Tae-hyeon		2:18
13.	"creep up on"		Kim Jung-ju, Kim Jae-rim		1:56
14.	"Like it" (난 좋았는데)		Na Hyun-ju, Chung Seung-hyun, Park Tae-hyeon		2:44
15.	"Before it burst" (터지기 일보직전)		Chung Seung-hyun, Na Hyun-ju		2:15
16.	"quarrel"		Kim Jung-ju, Kim Jae-rim		1:48
17.	"Namgoongdungi" (남궁둥이)		Chung Seung-hyun, Na Hyun-ju		1:55
18.	"Ambiguous"		Kim Jung-ju, Kim Jae-rim		1:59
19.	"Back"		Shin Hyung-bo		2:48
20.	"Our story" (우리들의 이야기)		Chung Seung-hyun, Park Tae-hyeon		2:13
21.	"Be offensive"		Chung Seung-hyun, Na Hyun-ju		2:34
22.	"Getting Nostalgic"		Kim Jung-ju, Kim Jae-rim, Chung Seung-hyun, Park Tae-hyeon		2:18
23.	"High Tension"		Kim Jung-ju, Kim Jae-rim		2:05
24.	"Loneliness"		Kim Jung-ju, Kim Jae-rim		1:26
25.	"Udangtangtang" (우당탕탕)		Chung Seung-hyun, Na Hyun-ju		2:12
26.	"A cute little routine" (작고 귀여운 일상)		Kim Jung-ju, Kim Jae-rim		1:54
27.	"One of them"		Chung Seung-hyun, Park Tae-hyeon		2:53
28.	"You're Suspicious" (너 수상해)		Chung Seung-hyun, Na Hyun-ju		2:02
29.	"Alone"		Shin Hyung-bo		1:32
30.	"Think carefully" (신중히 생각해)		Chung Seung-hyun, Na Hyun-ju		2:00
31.	"Disappointed"		Kim Jung-ju, Kim Jae-rim, Chung Seung-hyun, Park Tae-hyeon		1:41
32.	"Silence and Light"		Shin Hyung-bo		2:23
33.	"SPARK" (Inst.)		1601	A.C.E	3:47
34.	"FEVER" (Inst.)		1601	MOOK	3:48
Total length:					1h21min

== Episodes ==
No.	English title	Korean title	Directed by	Original release date
1	"Surprisingly, one of them is my first love"	놀랍게도, 이 중에 내 첫사랑이 있다	Lee Yoo-yeon	June 29, 2021
2	"There's a snail in the student council room?!"	학생회실에 우렁각시가 있다?!	Lee Yoo-yeon	July 1, 2021
3	"Being kind to everyone. Is it really good?"	모든 사람한테 다정한 게. 정말 좋은 걸까?	Lee Yoo-yeon	July 6, 2021
4	"I don't want you to hate me"	네가 날 싫어 하지 않았음 좋겠어	Lee Yoo-yeon	July 8, 2021
5	"Someone who cares about you"	은근히 신경쓰이는 사람	Lee Yoo-yeon	July 13, 2021
6	"It's a harder question than math questions"	수학문제보다 더 어려운 문제	Lee Yoo-yeon	July 15, 2021
7	"You can be honest with me"	저한테만은 솔직해져도 돼요	Lee Yoo-yeon	July 20, 2021
8	"I really don't like you"	너 진짜 마음에 안들어	Lee Yoo-yeon	July 22, 2021
9	"Find the answer to the question mark"	물음표의 정답을 찾아서	Lee Yoo-yeon	July 27, 2021
10	"The reason why I quit my love"	사랑을 그만두는 이유	Lee Yoo-yeon	July 29, 2021
11	"Rumors are rumors"	루머가 아닌 루머	Lee Yoo-yeon	August 3, 2021
12	"The reason we're becoming alike"	서로가 닮아가는 이유	Lee Yoo-yeon	August 5, 2021
13	"You're the answer that doesn't need a reason"	너는 이유가 필요 없는 정답이야	Lee Yoo-yeon	August 10, 2021
14	"I want to be with you"	같이 있고 싶어	Lee Yoo-yeon	August 12, 2021
15	"The heart of liking someone sincerely"	누군가를 진심으로 좋아하는 마음	Lee Yoo-yeon	August 17, 2021
16	"This is the story of my first love"	여기까지가 내 첫사랑 이야기이다	Lee Yoo-yeon	August 19, 2021

== International release ==
- In Japan, the series was released weekly on AbemaTV.
- In Thailand and the Philippines, the series was released weekly on WeTV.
- In India, the series was released for streaming on MX Player in Tamil, Telugu and Hindi dubbed versions.
- In western countries, the series was released weekly on Viki.
