= List of Vanner concert tours =

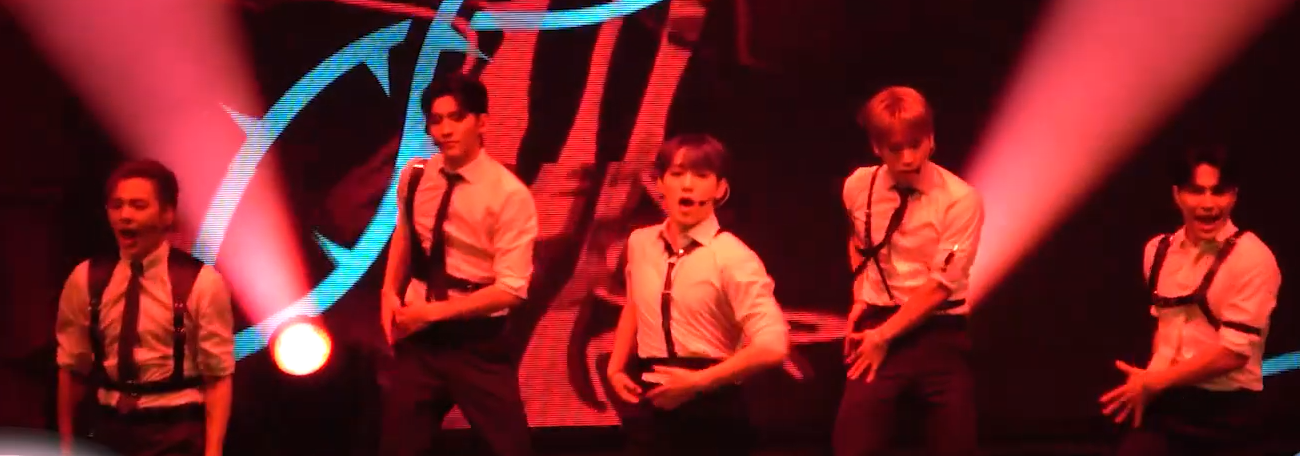
Vanner performing "Love Killa" at Taipei International Convention Center for 'Your Time' concert in July 2023

This is a list of concert tours held by South Korean boy group Vanner.

== Headlining concerts ==
=== The Flag: A to V ===
The Flag: A to V is Vanner's first standalone concert in five years since its debut. Initially a two-day event in Seoul, the group decided to add another day, making it a three-day concert due to Sungkook's enlistment on May 7, 2024. The concert tour also took place in several cities across Asia. Additionally, a two-day encore concert was held in Seoul on July 27 and 28, 2024.

Concert dates
Date	City	Country	Venue
Asia
April 26, 2024	Seoul	South Korea	Yes24 Live Hall
April 27, 2024	Seoul	South Korea	Yes24 Live Hall
April 28, 2024	Seoul	South Korea	Yes24 Live Hall
May 10, 2024 (Note: Only with Taehwan, Gon, Hyesung, and Yeonggwang, as Sungkook had already entered the military.)	Taipei	Taiwan	Zepp New Taipei
May 25, 2024	Tokyo	Japan	Kanda Square Hall
May 26, 2024 (Two shows)	Tokyo	Japan	Kanda Square Hall
July 1, 2024	Hong Kong	China	AXA Dreamland
July 27, 2024 (Note: Encore concert)	Seoul	South Korea	Yes24 Live Hall
July 28, 2024	Seoul	South Korea	Yes24 Live Hall

Setlist in Seoul
1. "Circuit"
2. "Want U Back"
3. "Jackpot"
4. "Be My Love"
5. "Diamonds"
6. "TBH" (솔직히)
7. "Swipe" (orig. song by Taeyong and Ten) (Gon and Hyesung)
8. "Loser=Lover" (orig. song by Tomorrow X Together) (Taehwan, Sungkook and Yeonggwang)
9. "Get A Guitar" (orig. song by Riize) (only on the April 26, 2024 show)
10. "Sherlock (Clue + Note)" (orig. song by Shinee) (only on the April 27, 2024 and April 28, 2024 show)
11. "Bouncy (K-Hot Chilli Peppers)" (orig. song by Ateez) (only on the April 28, 2024 show)
12. "Purge Day"
13. "Nasty"
14. "Form" (2023 ver.)
15. "After Party"
16. "Crazy Love" (미쳐버려)
17. "Better Do Better" (배로 두 배로)
18. "Savior"
19. "널 만나는 날"
20. "Be Together"
21. "Ponytail" (Korean ver.)
22. "Skyscraper"
23. "Performer"

Encore

24. "Like A Star" (only on the April 26, 2024 and April 28, 2024 show)
25. "Across the Stars" (only on the April 27, 2024 show)
26. "Rollin"
27. "트램펄린"
28. "Upper" (엎어)
29. "Form" (2023 ver.) (only on the April 27, 2024 and April 28, 2024 show)
30. "Lachata" (only on the April 28, 2024 show)
31. "Nasty" (only on the April 28, 2024 show)
32. "Jackpot" (only on the April 28, 2024 show)
Setlist in Taipei
1. "Circuit"
2. "Want U Back"
3. "Jackpot"
4. "Be My Love"
5. "Diamonds"
6. "TBH" (솔직히)
7. "Werewolves" (天黑請閉眼) (orig. song by Nine Chen and Qiu Fengze)
8. "Get A Guitar" (orig. song by Riize)
9. "Purge Day"
10. "Nasty"
11. "After Party"
12. "Better Do Better" (배로 두 배로)
13. "Savior"
14. "널 만나는 날"
15. "Be Together"
16. "Ponytail" (Korean ver.)
17. "Skyscraper"
18. "Performer"

Encore

19. "Across the Stars"
20. "Rollin"
21. "트램펄린"
22. "Form" (2023 ver.)
23. "Upper" (엎어)
Setlist in Tokyo
1. "Circuit"
2. "Want U Back"
3. "Jackpot"
4. "Be My Love"
5. "Diamonds"
6. "TBH" (솔직히)
7. "Case 143" (Japanese ver.) (orig. song by Stray Kids) (only on May 25, 2024 and the first show of May 26, 2024)
8. "Bouncy (K-Hot Chilli Peppers)" (orig. song by Ateez) (only on May 25, 2024 and the last show of May 26, 2024)
9. "Sherlock (Clue + Note)" (Japanese ver.) (orig. song by Shinee) (only on the first show of May 26, 2024)
10. "Get A Guitar" (orig. song by Riize) (only on the last show of May 26, 2024)
11. "Purge Day"
12. "Nasty"
13. "After Party"
14. "Better Do Better" (배로 두 배로)
15. "Savior"
16. "널 만나는 날"
17. "Be Together"
18. "Ponytail"
19. "Skyscraper"
20. "Performer" (Japanese ver.)

Encore

21. "Across the Stars"
22. "Rollin"
23. "트램펄린"
24. "Form" (2023 ver.)
25. "Jackpot" (only on the May 25, 2024 show)
26. "Upper" (엎어)
Setlist in Hong Kong
1. "Circuit"
2. "Want U Back"
3. "Jackpot"
4. "Be My Love"
5. "Diamonds"
6. "TBH" (솔직히)
7. "Under the Sakura Tree" (櫻花樹下) (orig. song by Hins Cheung)
8. "Sherlock (Clue + Note)" (orig. song by Shinee)
9. "Purge Day"
10. "Nasty"
11. "After Party"
12. "Better Do Better" (배로 두 배로)
13. "Savior"
14. "널 만나는 날"
15. "Be Together"
16. "Ponytail" (Korean ver.)
17. "Skyscraper"
18. "Performer"

Encore

19. "Across the Stars"
20. "Skyscraper"
21. "Rollin"
22. "트램펄린"
23. "Form" (2023 ver.)
24. "Upper" (엎어)
25. "Jackpot"
Setlist in Seoul (Encore)
1. "Circuit"
2. "Want U Back"
3. "Jackpot"
4. "Lachata"
5. "Be My Love"
6. "Diamonds"
7. "Missing You" (그리워하다) (orig. song by BtoB) (only on the July 27, 2024 show)
8. "You Were Beautiful" (예뻤어) (orig. song by Day6) (only on the July 28, 2024 show)
9. "Smoothie" (orig. song by NCT Dream)
10. "Purge Day"
11. "Nasty"
12. "Ponytail" (Korean ver.)
13. "Rollin"
14. "Better Do Better" (배로 두 배로)
15. "Savior"
16. "Crying" (우는남자)
17. "Be Together"
18. "New Heights"
19. "Skyscraper"
20. "Performer"
21. "Form" (2023 ver.)

Encore

22. "TBH" (솔직히)
23. "Across the Stars" (only on the July 27, 2024 show)
24. "Like a Star" (only on the July 28, 2024 show)
25. "트램펄린"
26. "Upper" (엎어)
27. "Crazy Love" (미쳐버려)
28. "Lachata" (only on the July 27, 2024 show)
29. "Form" (2023 ver.) (only on the July 28, 2024 show)
30. "Jackpot"

== Fan concerts ==
=== VVS Adventure ===
VVS Adventure is the group's first fan concert since their debut in 2019. The fan concert toured and continued in various cities across Asia.

Concert dates
Date	City	Country	Venue	Ref.
Asia
October 14, 2023	Seoul	South Korea	Yonsei University Centennial Hall	
October 15, 2023 (Two shows)	Seoul	South Korea	Yonsei University Centennial Hall	
October 26, 2023 (Two shows)	Osaka	Japan	Zepp Namba	
October 28, 2023 (Two shows)	Tokyo	Japan	Zepp Haneda	

Setlist in Seoul
1. "Lachata"
2. "Want U Back"
3. "Like A Star"
4. "I" (orig. song by Taeyeon) (Taehwan solo)
5. "Candy" (remake by NCT Dream of orig. song by H.O.T.) (Hyesung and Yeonggwang)
6. "Rocket" (orig. song by Mino) + "Blue Check" (orig. song by Toigo) (Gon and Sungkook)
7. "Diamonds"
8. "Performer"
9. "Purge Day"
10. "Form" (2023 ver.)

Encore

11. "Savior"
12. "TBH"
13. "Rollin" (only on the last show of October 15, 2023)
Setlist in Japan
1. "Lachata"
2. "Want U Back"
3. "Ponytail"
4. "I" (orig. song by Taeyeon) (Taehwan solo)
5. "Candy" (remake by NCT Dream of orig. song by H.O.T.) (Hyesung and Yeonggwang)
6. "Rocket" (orig. song by Mino) + "Blue Check" (orig. song by Toigo) (Gon and Sungkook)
7. "Diamonds"
8. "Performer" (Japanese ver.)
9. "Purge Day"
10. "Form" (2023 ver.)

Encore

11. "Savior"
12. "TBH"

== Tours ==
=== Vanner Rising in the U.S. ===
Concert dates
Date	City	Country	Venue
North America
January 17, 2020	Chicago	United States	Avondale Music Hall
January 19, 2020	New York City	United States	Roulette Intermedium
January 20, 2020	Atlanta	United States	Eddie Owen Presents
January 22, 2020	Denver	United States	Oriental Theater
January 26, 2020	Los Angeles	United States	David Henry Hwang Theater

=== 2022 U.S. Tour: Boost Up [Part 1] ===
Concert dates
Date	City	Country	Venue
North America
March 16, 2022	Chicago	United States	Bottom Lounge
March 18, 2022	Warrendale	United States	Jergel's Rhythm Grille
March 19, 2022	New York City	United States	The Brooklyn Monarch
March 22, 2022	Atlanta	United States	The Loft
March 24, 2022	Orlando	United States	Celine Orlando
March 26, 2022 (Note: Cancelled show)	Houston	United States	Warehouse Live
March 28, 2022	Dallas	United States	South Side Music Hall
March 29, 2022	San Antonio	United States	Paper Tiger
March 31, 2022	Sauget	United States	Pop's
April 1, 2022	Lawrence	United States	Granada Theater
April 3, 2022	Denver	United States	Summit Music Hall
April 4, 2022	Salt Lake City	United States	The Complex
April 6, 2022	San Francisco	United States	Great American Music Hall
April 8, 2022	Los Angeles	United States	The Vermont Hollywood

== Showcases ==
Title	Date	City	Country	Venue/Network	Ref.
Vanner Debut Showcase	February 13, 2019	Seoul	South Korea	Lotte FITIN	
2nd Single Album 'Life' Showcase	December 5, 2020	Worldwide		YouTube, V Live	
1st Mini Album 'Veni Vidi Vici' Showcase	August 21, 2023	Seoul	South Korea	Yes24 Live Hall	
2nd Mini Album 'Capture the Flag' Showcase	January 30, 2024	Seoul	South Korea	New Millennium Hall, Konkuk University	
3rd Mini Album 'Burn' Showcase	September 30, 2024	Seoul	South Korea	Shinhan Card SOL Pay Square Live Hall	

== Joint concerts and festival appearances ==
Date	Event	City	Country	Venue	Ref.
August 25, 2019	K-Asian Festival	Incheon	South Korea	Incheon Asiad Main Stadium	
October 3, 2019	2019 Seoul International Music Fair (MU:CON 2019)	Seoul	South Korea	COEX	
April 16, 2022 – April 17, 2022	Pocket Friends Tour in L.A.	Los Angeles	United States	The Vermont Hollywood	
May 5, 2023 – May 7, 2023	Peak Time Concert: Your Time	Seoul	South Korea	Jamsil Indoor Gymnasium	
June 24, 2023 – June 25, 2023	Peak Time Concert: Your Time	Busan	South Korea	KBS Busan Hall	
July 15, 2023	Peak Time Concert: Your Time	Taipei	Taiwan	Taipei International Convention Center	
July 22, 2023 – July 23, 2023	Peak Time Concert: Your Time	Seoul	South Korea	Korea University Hwajeong Gymnasium	
July 29, 2023	2023 4seidon Busan Water Music Festival	Busan	South Korea	Busan Asiad Auxiliary Stadium	
August 5, 2023	Pepsi Summer Festa 2023	Seoul	South Korea	Jamsil Indoor Gymnasium	
August 12, 2023	2023 4seidon Gwangju Water Music Festival	Gwangju	South Korea	Chosun University Stadium	
November 11, 2023 – November 12, 2023	2023 Awesome Stage #3	Seoul	South Korea	KBS Arena	
November 25, 2023	Peak Time Concert: Your Time	Kaohsiung	Taiwan	Kaohsiung Arena	
December 9, 2023	Peak Time Concert: Your Time	Hong Kong	China	Kowloonbay International Trade & Exhibition Centre	
January 12, 2024	Sharing & Together Concert (S2CON)	Seoul	South Korea	SK Olympic Handball Gymnasium	
March 9, 2024	Peak Time in Japan: Return Match	Saitama	Japan	Sonic City Hall	
May 11, 2024 – May 12, 2024	KCON Japan 2024	Chiba	Japan	Makuhari Messe	
July 20, 2024	Waterbomb Daegu 2024	Daegu	South Korea	Daegu Stadium	
August 9, 2024	Summer Island Festival	Boryeong	South Korea	Daecheon Beach	
September 21, 2024	Rapbeat 2024	Songdo	South Korea	Songdo Moonlight Festival Park	
September 22, 2024	2024 Pepsi Festa: The New Era	Seoul	South Korea	Jamsil Students' Gymnasium	
October 22, 2024	2024 Hoseo University Cheonan Campus Gaon x Haru Festival	Cheonan	South Korea	Hoseo University Cheonan Campus	
