= Sevenus =

South Korean boy band

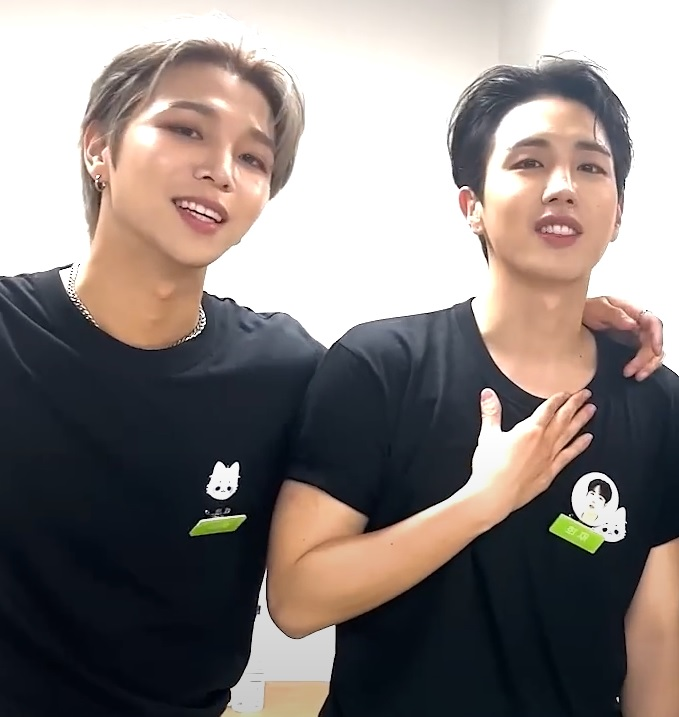
- SEVENUS in 2023: Ireah (left) and Heejae (right)

Background information
- Origin: Seoul, South Korea
- Genres: K-pop
- Years active: 2016–2020, 2023–present
- Labels: JJ Holic Media; Lotus E&M; PCS
- Members: Heejae; Ireah
- Past members: 26; ACE; Chibin; Doeun; Moonbong; Woosoo
- Website: Official website

Korean name
- Hangul: 세븐어스
Transcriptions
- Revised Romanization: Sebeuneoseu

Japanese name
- Katakana: セブンアース
Transcriptions
- Kunrei-shiki: Sebunāsu

Sevenus (Korean: 세븐어스; stylized in all caps) is a South Korean male duo consists of Heejae and Ireah under PCS Entertainment.

On the survival competition show Peak Time, Heejae and Ireah participated as two members under their former group name Masc (Korean: 마스크; stylized in all caps). After finishing in second place, it was announced on May 3, 2023 that they had signed an exclusive contract with PCS Entertainment and would embark on their new start and reform the group as a duo. On May 9, 2023, the duo announced they would change their name to Sevenus. The "seven" holds meaning to them because they were Team 7:00 while on the show, and being with the fans is referred to in the word "us".

== History ==
=== 2016–2020: Masc debut, activities and disbandment ===
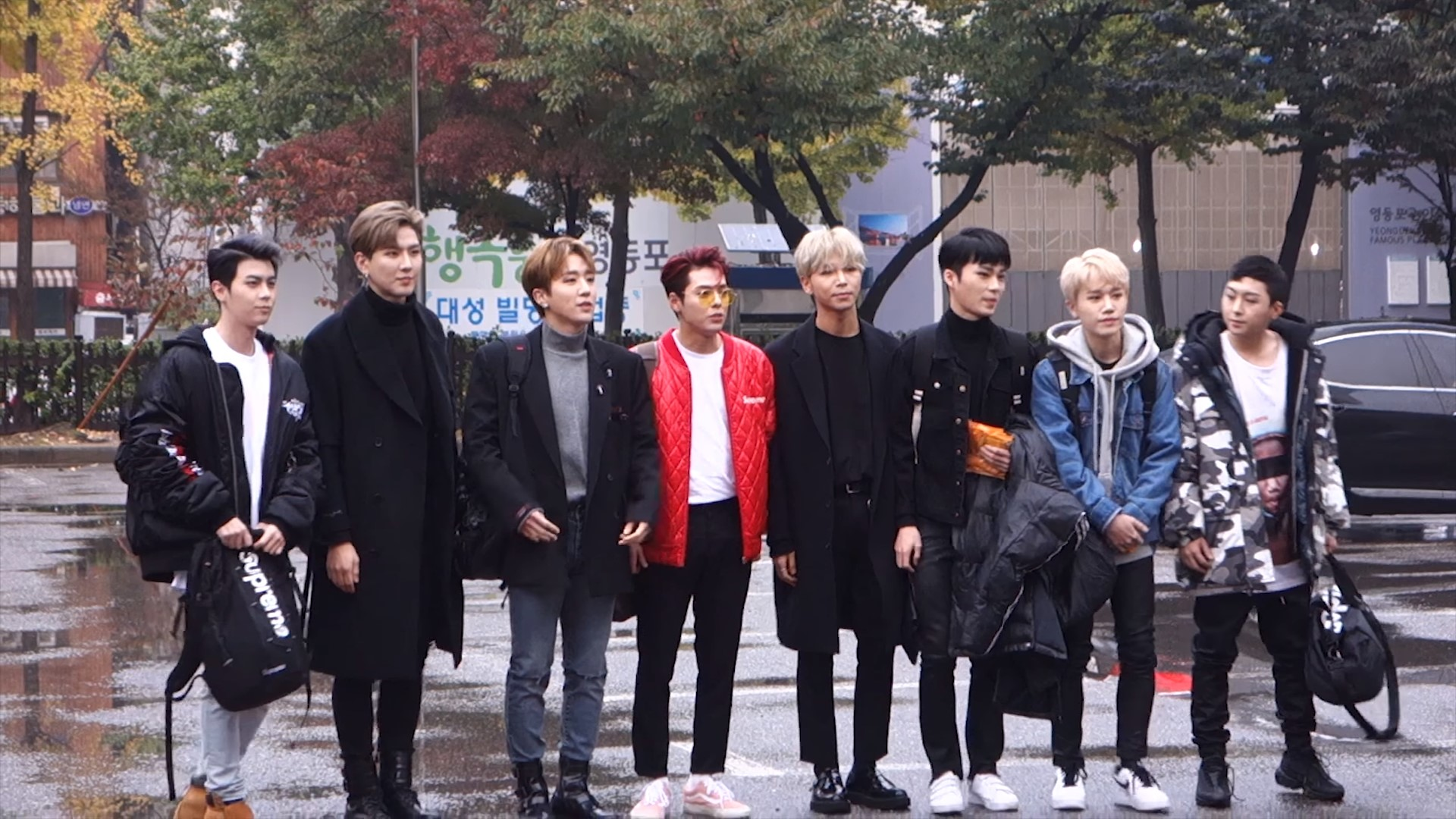
The group as MASC in November 2017.

Masc officially debuted as a four-member group comprising Heejae, Woosoo, 26, and ACE under JJ Holic Media on August 19, 2016. At the same time, the group released their first mini album Strange, including a lead single of the same name.

The group released its second single, "Tina", on February 4, 2017. Ireah joined the group as a new member along with Moonbong, Doeun, and Chibin, and they were introduced with the release of Masc's third single, "Do It", on October 12.

In July 2018, Chibin alleged that ACE had assaulted him, leading to both members leaving the group. Soon after, member 26 left the group to focus on a career in film. In October, the group announced it would resume activities with four members: Woosoo, Heejae, Ireah, and Moonbong.

Masc released the single "Maschera" on May 27, 2019. That year, the group toured South America in May and Europe in June and July.

On October 18, 2020, the group announced their disbandment through a YouTube video.

=== 2023–present: Peak Time's Team 7:00, reformation and Summús ===
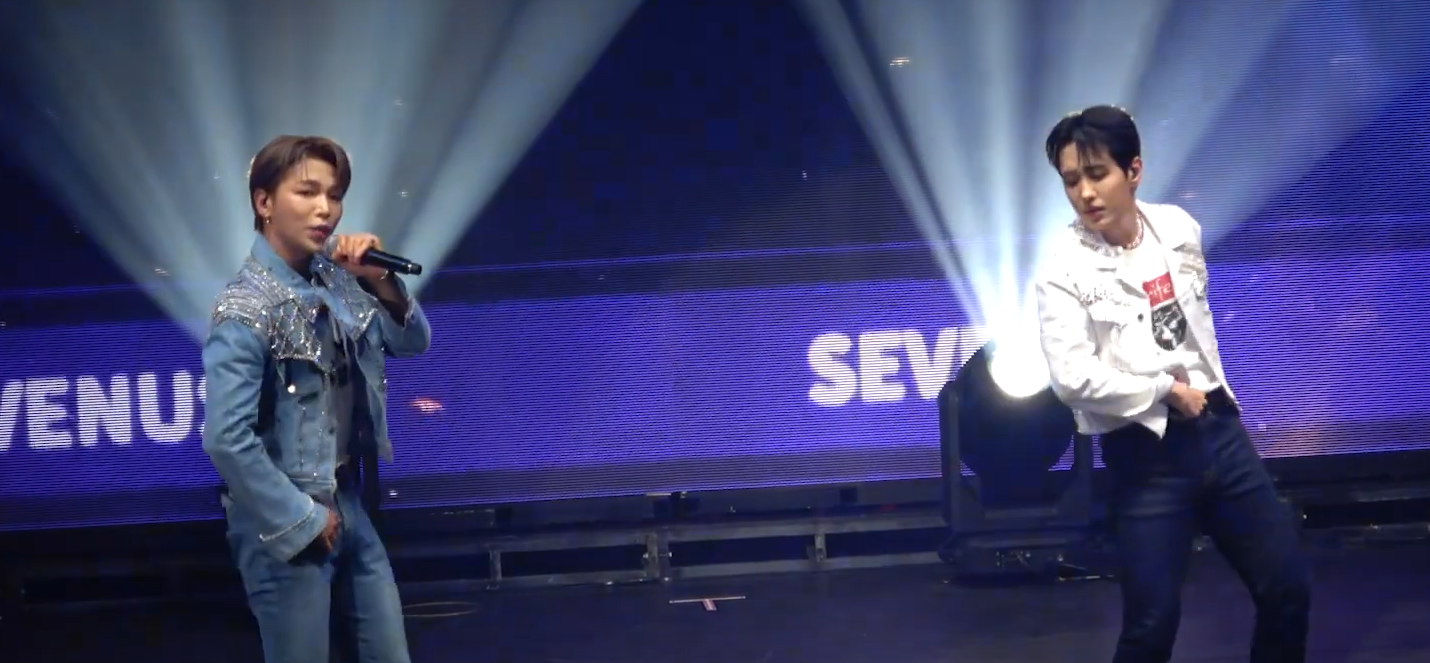
SEVENUS at Peak Time Concert "Your Time" in Taipei, Taiwan.

In February 2023, members Heejae and Ireah first appeared as a singing duo on the JTBC reality competition show Peak Time. The pair were introduced in the show as Team 7:00, as the show's contestants were represented with an hour of the day. They revealed their group name as Masc during the show's final episode in April, and they ultimately came in second place. In May, they signed with PCS Entertainment and announced they would reform the group as a duo and promote it under the new name, Sevenus.

Sevenus released their debut single album Summús on July 31, with "Wonder Land" as the lead single.

== Members ==
Current members (as Sevenus)

- Heejae (희재)
- Ireah (이레)

Past members (as Masc)

- Woosoo (우수)
- 26 (이륙)
- ACE (에이스)
- Doeun (도은)
- Chibin (치빈)
- Moonbong (문봉)

== Discography ==
=== Extended plays ===
List of extended plays, with selected details, chart positions and sales
Title	Details	Peak chart positions	Sales
Title	Details	KOR	Sales
Masc
Strange	Released: August 19, 2016; Labels: JJ Holic Media, Lotus E&M; Format: CD, digital download, streaming; Track listing: 1. "Strange" (낯설어); 2. "I Can't Breathe" (숨도 못 쉬겠다); 3. "Meaningless" (의미 없어); 4. "Why Always Me?" (왜 또 나야?); 5. "Strange" (낯설어) (Inst.); 6. "I Can't Breathe" (숨도 못 쉬겠다) (Inst.)	25	KOR: 822
Sevenus
Spring Canvas	Released: March 15, 2024; Labels: PCS Entertainment, Warner Music Korea; Format: CD, digital download, streaming; Track listing: 1. "Want You Back"; 2. "우성"; 3. "Blues" (Ireah solo); 4. "Day by Day" (Heejae solo ft. Roda of M.O.N.T); 5. "Pretty Good"	6	KOR: 44,334
Stay Tuned	Released: December 9, 2024; Labels: PCS Entertainment, Warner Music Korea; Format: CD, digital download, streaming; Track listing: 1. "Be My World"; 2. "By"; 3. "Starlight"; 4. "Wish" (바람); 5. "Slomo"; 6. "Cold and Shiny" (차갑고, 반짝이는)	9	KOR: 11,977
White Fall	Released: November 25, 2025; Labels: PCS Entertainment, Warner Music Korea; Format: CD, digital download, streaming; Track listing: 1. "Airplane Mode"; 2. "Sunny Side Up"; 3. "An Enduring Dream"; 4. "Airplane Mode" (instrumental)	23	KOR: 23,133

=== Single albums ===
List of single albums, with selected details, chart positions and sales
Title	Details	Peak chart positions	Sales
Title	Details	KOR	Sales
Summús	Released: July 31, 2023; Label: PCS Entertainment, Warner Music Korea; Formats: CD, digital download, streaming; Track listing: 1. "Summer Ride"; 2. "Wonder Land"; 3. "In a Dream"; 4. "Wonder Land" (Inst.)	16	KOR: 36,087

=== Singles ===
List of singles, showing year released, chart positions and album name
Title	Year	Peak chart positions	Album
Title	Year	KOR Down.	Album
Masc
"Strange" (낯설어)	2016	—	Strange
"Tina" (티나)	2017	—	Non-album singles
"Do It" (다해)	2017	—	Non-album singles
"Maschera"	2019	—	Non-album singles
Sevenus
"Wonder Land"	2023	127	Summús
"Mirror"	2023	—	Non-album single
"Want You Back"	2024	—	Spring Canvas
"Pretty Good"	2024	—	Spring Canvas
"Ten Thousand Possibilities of Falling in Love with You" (一万种恋爱的可能)	2024	—	Non-album single
"Slomo"	2024	—	Stay Tuned
"Airplane Mode"	2025	—	White Fall
"—" denotes releases that did not chart or were not released in that region.

=== Collaborations ===
List of collaborations
Title	Year	Member(s)	Other artist(s)	Album
"Your Time"	2023	All	Peak Time Top 6 (Vanner, Team 24:00, DKB, BAE173, M.O.N.T)	Non-album single

=== Compilation albums ===
List of compilation albums
Title	Year	Album
"Hello" (orig. song by NU'EST)	2023	Peak Time – Survival Round
"You Are" (orig. song by Got7)	2023	Peak Time – 1 Round <Rival match> Part.2
"Doesn't Matter"	2023	Peak Time – 3 Round <Originals match>
"Wave" (Prod. GroovyRoom)	2023	Peak Time – <Final Round>

== Filmography ==
=== Television shows ===
List of television show appearances
Year	Title	Network	Role	Notes	Ref.
2023	Peak Time	JTBC	Contestant as Team 7:00	2nd Place	

== Awards and nominations ==
Name of the award ceremony, year presented, category, nominee of the award, and the result of the nomination
Award ceremony	Year	Category	Nominee / Work	Result	Ref.
Asia Artist Awards	2023	Popularity Award – Male Singer	Sevenus	Longlisted	
Asia Artist Awards	2024	Popularity Award – Male Singer	Sevenus	Longlisted	
K-Star MVA (Note: A Japan-Korea joint project held by "Idol Champ", a global support app for K-pop idols, which awards the "Best Artist" who is most supported by global K-Pop fans and the "Next Star" who will carry the future of K-Pop.)	2023	Next Star – Men	Sevenus	Nominated	

=== Honors ===
Name of organization, year given, and the name of the honor
Organization	Year	Honor	Ref.
Korea Best Brand Awards: Korea Hallyu Entertainment Award	2024	Asia Star Award – Asian Male Duo	
Korea Best Brand Awards: Proud Korean Award	2024	Proud Korean Grand Prize Award	
