= Eshy Gazit =

Eshy Gazit is a music industry executive best known for his work as the CEO of Gramophone Media, who worked as the US managing partner of K-pop groups, BTS and Monsta X, with several Pop and K-pop artists.

== Career ==
In 2014, Gazit founded Gramophone Media, Inc., a music company based out of NYC and Los Angeles. Currently, Gramophone Media, Inc. encompasses seven imprints: All The Best Media, Right Angle PR, EAR Music Company with Randy Jackson, The Influent, Noise Management, HyPR Media, and Effectively Immediately PR.

Prior to forming Gramophone Media, Inc., Gazit was house producer/engineer at Manhattan's KEXP Radio and The Cutting Room studios. There he worked with Chrisette Michele on her album Epiphany, which went on to debut No. 1 on the Billboard 200 chart, as well as peaking at No. 1 on Billboard's US Top R&B/Hip Hop albums. Out of this studio, Gazit formed Modern Vintage Recordings, a small label which he would later develop into Gramophone Media, Inc. In 2016, Gazit partnered with tech company WIX, music blog Pigeons and Planes, producer Steve Aoki, and entertainment executive Randy Jackson to launch the #WixMusic showcase at SXSW music festival.

In February 2019, Gazit joined Maverick as a partner.

On April 26, 2021, Gazit was selected by Billboard as an international power player.

In June, Gazit and BMG Rights Management launched the record label Intertwine.

On April 25, 2022, Gazit was selected by Billboard as an international power player.

On April 6, 2023, Gazit signed K-pop artist AleXa with Intertwine.

On June 15, 2023, Gazit signed Peak Time's winner Vanner with Intertwine.
