= Vanner (band) =

South Korean boy band

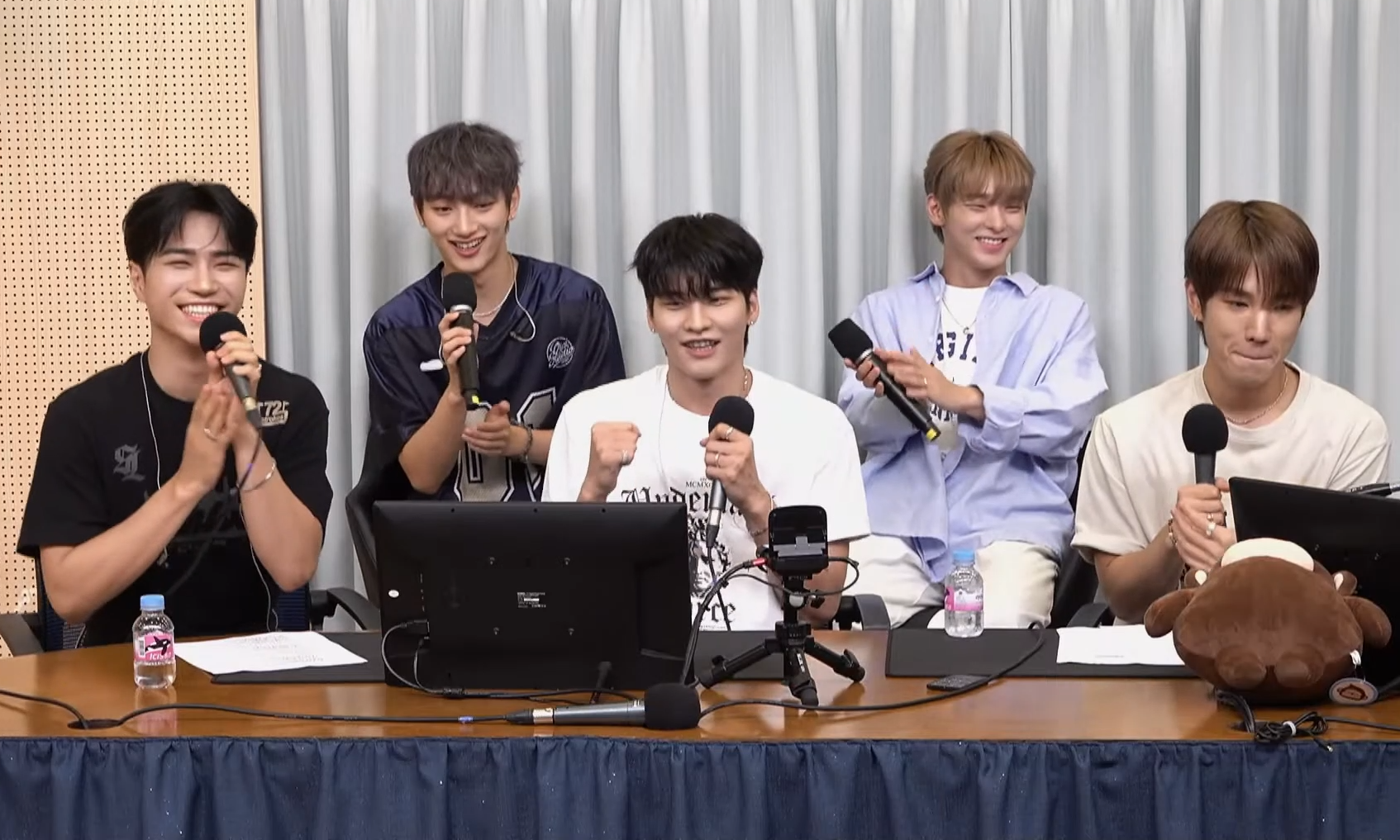
- Vanner in August 2023; From L–R: Taehwan, Yeonggwang, Gon, Hyesung, and Sungkook

Background information
- Origin: Seoul, South Korea
- Genre: K-pop
- Years active: 2019–2025 (hiatus)
- Labels: VT; KLAP; Intertwine; CTM
- Members: Taehwan; Gon; Hyesung; Sungkook; Yeonggwang
- Website: Official website

Korean name
- Hangul: 배너
Transcriptions
- Revised Romanization: Baeneo

Japanese name
- Hiragana: バナー
Transcriptions
- Kunrei-shiki: Banā

Vanner (Korean: 배너; stylized in all caps) is a South Korean boy band formed by VT Entertainment. The group is composed of five members: Taehwan, Gon, Hyesung, Sungkook, and Yeonggwang. They officially debuted on February 14, 2019, with the studio album V.

== History ==
=== 2018: Pre-debut and Japanese promotions ===
The members of Vanner—Taehwan, Gon, Hyesung, Sungkook, and Yeonggwang—were trainees for an average of five years. The group initiated their promotional activities in Japan in 2018, holding concerts in Tokyo and Osaka. They performed more than 200 times in Japan prior to their Korean debut. The group also started a crowdfunding support project which achieved over 250% of the target amount reflecting a global fandom even before their official debut.

=== 2019–2022: Career beginnings ===
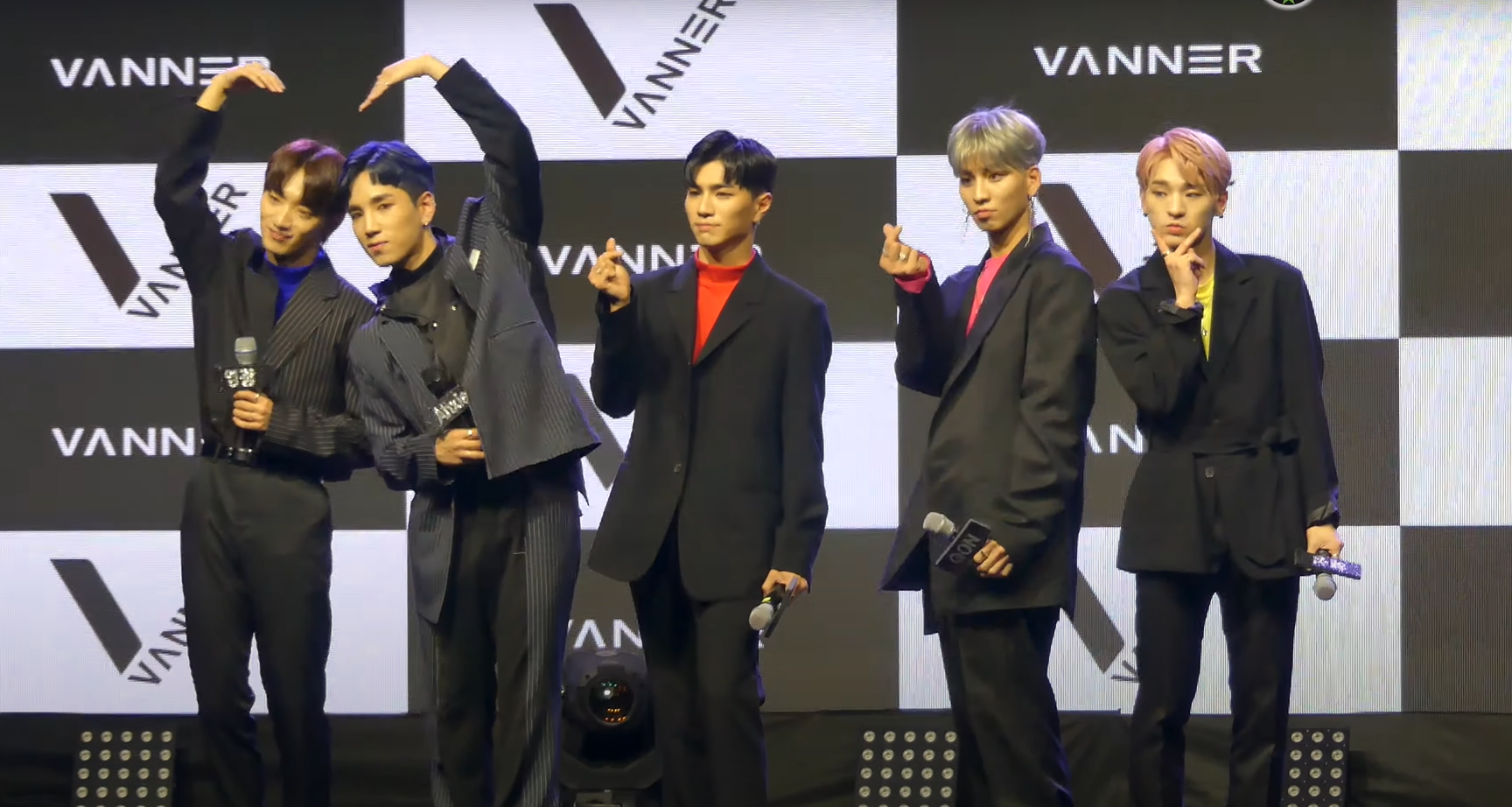
Vanner during their debut showcase in February 2019

On February 14, 2019, the group officially debuted upon the release of their studio album V and its lead single "Better Do Better," as well as appeared on Mnet's music show M Countdown for the first time. Later that year, the group released their first single album 5cean: V with "Crazy Love" as its lead single on September 4. They also performed at the 2019 Seoul International Music Fair (MU:CON 2019) held in COEX, Seoul on October 3, 2019.

At the beginning of 2020, Vanner successfully finished its United States tour concert, Vanner Rising in the U.S., around five cities for 10 days. The group released their second single album Life with "Form" (폼) as its single on December 1, 2020. The comeback showcase was broadcast live simultaneously around the world through YouTube and V Live on December 5.

In 2021, they participated and performed at K-Stage 2021: Untact Concert, a series of online concerts streamed on YouTube and MuBeat platform. On December 26, 2021, Vanner attended and performed at the 2021 K-Stage Awards and was awarded the "Global K-pop Star Award".

Vanner released their third single album Take Off with "Rollin" as its single on February 28, 2022. On March 2, it was announced that Vanner will begin its U.S. tour, 2022 U.S. Tour: Boost Up Part 1, around 14 cities starting on March 16. Also, it was announced on March 25, that the group will perform at a K-pop concert, Pocket Friends Tour in LA, on April 16 to 17.

=== 2023: Peak Time's Team 11:00, Veni Vidi Vici, and VVS Adventure ===
In February 2023, it was announced that the group would be included among the 24 contestants in the JTBC idol survival show Peak Time. Vanner was introduced in the show as Team 11:00, as the contestants were represented with an hour of the day. On April 20, Vanner was declared the show's winner with a cumulative total of 1.46 million votes globally and domestically. Through the show, the group received and released two new songs, "Skyscraper" and "Prime Time". As part of the top 6 and the final winning team, Vanner performed in the Your Time concert tour in Seoul on May 5 to 7 at Jamsil Indoor Gymnasium, Busan on June 24 to 25 at KBS Busan Hall, Taipei, Taiwan on July 15 at Taipei International Convention Center, Hong Kong on December 9 at Kowloonbay International Trade & Exhibition Centre, and encore performances at Korea University's Hwajeong Gymnasium from July 22 to 23 and Kaohsiung Arena in Kaohsiung, Taiwan on November 25.

In May 2023, the group signed with KLAP Entertainment to help them in album production, promotion, and management for three years. On June 16, Vanner signed a management contract with Eshy Gazit's Intertwine for the group's U.S. activities.

On August 21, Vanner returned after winning Peak Time and released their first mini album Veni Vidi Vici. The group held their showcase at Yes24 Live Hall, where they presented their lead single "Performer" and Monsta X's Hyungwon-produced song "Want U Back". The EP topped the iTunes Global Album Chart in the Philippines, Hong Kong, and Taiwan and ranked second, fourth, and ninth in Brazil, Italy, and the Netherlands, respectively. The group also exceeded its 100,000 album sales during this comeback.

The group announced on August 31 their plan to hold their first fan concert since their debut. The VVS Adventure concert tour is scheduled in various cities across Asia. On October 14 and 15, 2023, Vanner hosted their inaugural fan concert at the Yonsei University Centennial Hall in Seoul. This was followed by a two-day concert in Japan, with shows at Zepp Music Halls in Osaka and Tokyo on October 26 and 28, respectively. At the same time, on October 26, Vanner released their first Japanese digital single, which includes two songs, "Ponytail" and a Japanese version of their song "Performer".

Furthermore, Vanner attended and performed at the 5th Newsis Korean Wave Expo on August 23, where the group was honored with the "Next Generation Hallyu Star Award". Additionally, on November 5, the group was invited to perform at the closing event of the 2023 Asia Model Festival. Vanner was presented with the "Rising Star Award" during the Asia Model Awards ceremony.

=== 2024–2025: Capture the Flag, The Flag: A to V, Burn, members' conscription, and indefinite hiatus ===
On January 30, Vanner released their second mini album Capture the Flag. To celebrate their comeback, the group held a showcase and busking event where they performed songs from their mini album. The songs included their lead single "Jackpot", produced by Pentagon's Hui and Wooseok, and "Be My Love", produced by BtoB's Hyunsik. The EP reached number one on the iTunes Global Album Chart in the Philippines and Colombia, and landed in the top ten for charts in Brazil, Hong Kong, Malaysia, Taiwan, Russia, and Italy. The group was also invited to the 31st Hanteo Music Awards at Dongdaemun Design Plaza in Seoul on February 17, where they performed and were awarded as the "Hanteo Choice K-pop Male Artist".

In February 2024, KLAP Entertainment announced that Vanner would hold its first solo concert in five years. The Flag: A to V concert was initially planned for two days in Seoul. However, the group later decided to add another day due to Sungkook's military enlistment on May 7, 2024. The inaugural headlining concert was held from April 26 to 28, 2024, at Yes24 Live Hall in Seoul. During the concert, the group released their new song "Be Together" as a part of their setlist. Following the shows in Seoul, the concert tour continued without Sungkook and took place in Taiwan, Japan, and Hong Kong. Additionally, a two-day encore concert in Seoul took place on July 27 and 28, 2024. Vanner also released their new English song "New Heights" and included it in their setlist during the concert.

At the beginning of September, the band announced their comeback in the latter part of the month. This marks their first appearance as a four-member group, with Sungkook being absent due to his conscription in May. A couple of weeks prior to their comeback, the band dropped their first English single, a cover of Charlie Puth's "I Don't Think That I Like Her", on September 13. The single achieved top positions in several iTunes charts in Hong Kong, Taiwan, Canada, Malaysia, Poland, and the Philippines. On September 30, Vanner revealed their third mini album Burn. The band hosted a showcase during which they performed tracks from their EP, including their lead single "Automatic", as well as previously introduced songs from their concert, "Be Together" and "New Heights", and "Blossom", a piece written and composed by Highlight's Lee Gi-kwang. Burn also achieved the top spot on various iTunes charts in the Philippines, United Kingdom, United States, Taiwan, Turkey, Hong Kong, and Brazil. On October 11, Vanner earned their first-ever music show win in the KBS television music program Music Bank with their lead single "Automatic".

On October 17, KLAP Entertainment announced that Hyesung would begin his mandatory military enlistment on November 4 and serve as an active-duty soldier, similar to his fellow member Sungkook. However, due to medical reasons, Hyesung was discharged from military service on December 16, 2024.

On May 21, 2025, Vanner released their fourth single album Goodbye & Hello, marking the group's last release under KLAP Entertainment and VT Entertainment. In August 2025, Taehwan announced on their official fan cafe the band's indefinite hiatus.

== Members ==
- Taehwan (태환) – leader
- Gon (곤)
- Hyesung (혜성)
- Sungkook (성국)
- Yeonggwang (영광)

== Discography ==
=== Studio albums ===
List of studio albums, with selected details, chart positions and sales
| Title | Details | Peak chart positions | Sales |
| Title | Details | KOR | Sales |
|---|---|---|---|
| V | Released: February 14, 2019; Labels: VT Entertainment, PAN Entertainment, Music&New; Formats: CD, digital download, streaming; Track listing: 1. "Upper" (엎어); 2. "Better Do Better" (배로 두 배로); 3. "Without You"; 4. "불을 밝혀줘"; 5. "Nasty"; 6. "Like a Star"; 7. "트램펄린"; 8. "말이라고해"; 9. "Solo"; 10. "널 만나는 날"; 11. "Upper" (엎어) (Inst.); 12. "Better Do Better" (배로 두 배로) (Inst.); 13. "Without You" (Inst.); 14. "불을 밝혀줘 (Inst.) (CD only); 15. "Like a Star" (Inst.) (CD only); 16. "트램펄린" (Inst.) (CD only); 17. "널 만나는 날" (Inst.) (CD only) | 67 | KOR: 561 |

=== Extended plays ===
List of extended plays, with selected details, chart positions and sales
| Title | Details | Peak chart positions | | | Sales |
| Title | Details | KOR | JPN Hot | US World | Sales |
|---|---|---|---|---|---|
| Veni Vidi Vici | Released: August 21, 2023; Labels: KLAP Entertainment, Genie Music; Formats: CD, digital download, streaming; Track listing: 1. "Performer"; 2. "Diamonds"; 3. "TBH" (솔직히); 4. "Want U Back"; 5. "Savior"; 6. "Form" (폼) (2023 ver.) | 4 | 27 | — | KOR: 141,932; JPN: 2,498 (phy.) |
| Capture the Flag | Released: January 30, 2024; Labels: KLAP Entertainment, Genie Music; Formats: CD, digital download, streaming; Track listing: 1. "Jackpot"; 2. "Ponytail" (Korean ver.); 3. "After Party"; 4. "Be My Love"; 5. "Circuit"; 6. "Across the Stars" | 3 | — | — | KOR: 150,560 |
| Burn | Released: September 30, 2024; Labels: KLAP Entertainment, Genie Music; Formats: CD, digital download, streaming; Track listing: 1. "Revolver"; 2. "Automatic"; 3. "New Heights"; 4. "Blossom"; 5. "Xcellerate"; 6. "Be Together" | 2 | — | 14 | KOR: 157,729 |

=== Single albums ===
List of single albums, with selected details, chart positions and sales
| Title | Details | Peak chart positions | Sales |
| Title | Details | Circle Album ChartKOR | Sales |
Korean
| 5cean: V | Released: September 4, 2019; Labels: VT Entertainment, PAN Entertainment, Naturally Music; Formats: CD, digital download, streaming; Track listing: 1. "Purge Day"; 2. "Crazy Love" (미쳐버려); 3. "Crying" (우는남자) | 40 | KOR: 1,109 |
| Life "생 (生)" | Released: December 1, 2020; Labels: VT Entertainment, PAN Entertainment, Music&New; Formats: CD, digital download, streaming; Track listing: 1. "Form" (폼); 2. "Lachata" | 52 | —N/a |
| Take Off | Released: February 28, 2022; Labels: VT Entertainment, PAN Entertainment, Music&New; Formats: CD, digital download, streaming; Track listing: 1. "Rollin"; 2. "Rollin" (Inst.) | — | —N/a |
| Goodbye & Hello | Released: May 21, 2025; Labels: KLAP Entertainment; Formats: PVC card, digital download, streaming; Track listing: 1. "Goodbye & Hello"; 2. "Pinch Me"; 3. "New Heights" (English ver.) | —N/a | —N/a |
Japanese
| Performer | Released: October 26, 2023; Labels: KLAP Entertainment, Happinet Music; Formats: Digital download, streaming; Track listing: 1. "Performer" (Japanese ver.); 2. "Ponytail" | —N/a | —N/a |
"—" denotes releases that did not chart or were not released in that region.

=== Singles ===
List of singles, showing year released, chart positions and album name
| Title | Year | Peak chart positions | Album |
| Title | Year | KOR Down. | Album |
Korean
| "Better Do Better" (배로 두 배로) | 2019 | — | V |
| "Crazy Love" (미쳐버려) | 2019 | — | 5cean: V |
| "Form" (폼) | 2020 | — | Life "생 (生)" |
| "Rollin" | 2022 | — | Take Off |
| "Performer" | 2023 | 18 | Veni Vidi Vici |
| "Jackpot" | 2024 | 44 | Capture the Flag |
| "I Don't Think That I Like Her" (orig. song by Charlie Puth) | 2024 | — | Non-album single |
| "Automatic" | 2024 | 14 | Burn |
Japanese
| "Performer" (Japanese ver.) | 2023 | —N/a | Performer |
| "Ponytail" | 2023 | —N/a | Performer |
"—" denotes releases that did not chart or were not released in that region.

=== Other charted songs ===
List of other charted songs, showing year released, chart positions and album name
| Title | Year | Peak chart positions | Album |
| Title | Year | KOR Down. | Album |
|---|---|---|---|
| "Want U Back" | 2023 | 66 | Veni Vidi Vici |
| "Diamonds" | 2023 | 67 | Veni Vidi Vici |
| "TBH" (솔직히) | 2023 | 69 | Veni Vidi Vici |
| "Savior" | 2023 | 70 | Veni Vidi Vici |
| "Form" (폼) (2023 ver.) | 2023 | 72 | Veni Vidi Vici |
| "Be My Love" | 2024 | 78 | Capture the Flag |
| "Ponytail" (Korean ver.) | 2024 | 85 | Capture the Flag |
| "Circuit" | 2024 | 87 | Capture the Flag |
| "After Party" | 2024 | 88 | Capture the Flag |
| "Across the Stars" | 2024 | 91 | Capture the Flag |
| "Blossom" | 2024 | 44 | Burn |
| "Revolver" | 2024 | 46 | Burn |
| "Be Together" | 2024 | 48 | Burn |
| "New Heights" | 2024 | 49 | Burn |
| "Xcellerate" | 2024 | 50 | Burn |

=== Collaborations ===
List of collaborations
| Title | Year | Member(s) | Other artist(s) | Album |
|---|---|---|---|---|
| "Couples Are the Same" (커플은 똑같아) | 2023 | Taehwan | Harin (Pink Fantasy) | K Stage – 1st Album |
| "Your Time" | 2023 | All | Peak Time Top 6 (Sevenus, Team 24:00, DKB, BAE173, M.O.N.T) | Non-album single |

=== Other appearances ===
List of appearances on other albums
| Title | Year | Album |
|---|---|---|
| "Adore U" (Note: Credited as "Team 11:00") (orig. song by Seventeen) | 2023 | Peak Time – Survival Round |
| "Love Killa" (orig. song by Monsta X) | 2023 | Peak Time – 1 Round <Rival match> Part.1 |
| "My Bag" (Note: Credited as "Rap C Unit", only features Sungkook.) (orig. song by (G)I-dle) | 2023 | Peak Time – 2 Round <Union match> Part.1 |
| "Way Back Home" (Note: Credited as "Vocal C Unit", only features Taehwan.) (orig. song by BtoB) | 2023 | Peak Time – 2 Round <Union match> Part.1 |
| "Skyscraper" | 2023 | Peak Time – 3 Round <Originals match> |
| "Prime Time" (Prod. Ryan S. Jhun) | 2023 | Peak Time – <Final Round> |
| "Saturday Night" (orig. song by Kim Se-hwan) | 2023 | Immortal Songs: Singing the Legend (Artist Yoon Hyung-joo & Kim Se-hwan, Part 1) |

== Filmography ==
=== Television shows ===
| Year | Title | Network | Role | Notes | Ref. |
|---|---|---|---|---|---|
| 2023 | Peak Time | JTBC | Contestant as Team 11:00 | Winner | |
| 2023 | Immortal Songs: Singing the Legend | KBS | Contestant | Ep. 627: Artist Yoon Hyung-joo & Kim Se-hwan, Part 1 | |

=== Online shows ===
| Year | Title | | Platform | Notes | Ref. |
| Year | English | Korean | Platform | Notes | Ref. |
|---|---|---|---|---|---|
| 2023 | Picnic Time | 피크닉 타임 | YouTube, Abema | Peak Time spin-off, 6 episodes | |
| 2023–present | Vanner For You | 배너해드림 | YouTube | Variety show; ongoing | |

== Tours and concerts ==
=== Headlining concerts ===
- The Flag: A to V (2024)

=== Fan concerts ===
- VVS Adventure (2023)

=== Tours ===
- Vanner Rising in the US (2020)
- 2022 US Tour: Boost Up Part I (2022)

== Ambassadorship ==
On February 14, 2024, the group was appointed as Daejeon's public relation ambassadors for two years. Vanner is among the 22 new ambassadors that will engage in various promotional activities for festivals and events representing Daejeon.

== Awards and nominations ==
Name of the award ceremony, year presented, category, nominee of the award, and the result of the nomination
| Award ceremony | Year | Category | Nominee / Work | Result | Ref. |
|---|---|---|---|---|---|
| Asia Artist Awards | 2023 | Popularity Award – Music | Vanner | Longlisted | |
| Asia Artist Awards | 2024 | Popularity Award – Music | Vanner | Nominated | |
| Asia Model Awards (Note: The Asia Model Awards is an annual event that recognizes talents across various entertainment categories, such as modeling, acting, singing, fashion and beauty in Asia.) | 2023 | Rising Star Award – Singer | Vanner | Won | |
| Brand Customer Loyalty Award (Note: Co-organized by the Korean Customers Council and Brand Keys, this event recognizes the most influential brands in society and culture, as determined through consumer research.) | 2024 | Rising Star Award – Male Idol | Vanner | Won | |
| Hanteo Music Awards | 2024 | Hanteo Choice K-pop Male Artist | Vanner | Won | |
| Hanteo Music Awards | 2024 | Post Generation Award | Vanner | Nominated | |
| Hanteo Music Awards | 2025 | Global Artist Award – Asia | Vanner | Nominated | |
| Hanteo Music Awards | 2025 | Global Artist Award – North America | Vanner | Nominated | |
| Hanteo Music Awards | 2025 | Global Artist Award – Africa | Vanner | Longlisted | |
| Hanteo Music Awards | 2025 | Global Artist Award – Europe | Vanner | Longlisted | |
| Hanteo Music Awards | 2025 | Global Artist Award – Oceania | Vanner | Longlisted | |
| Hanteo Music Awards | 2025 | Global Artist Award – South America | Vanner | Longlisted | |
| Hanteo Music Awards | 2025 | WhosFandom Award | Vanner | Nominated | |
| Korea First Brand Awards (Note: Hosted by the Korea Consumer Brand Committee and supervised by the Korea Consumer Forum, the Korea First Brand Awards selects promising brands that will lead the year and bases its winners on consumption trend analysis, extensive nationwide consumer surveys, and evaluation and deliberation by experts.) | 2024 | Rising Star – Male Idol | Vanner | Nominated | |
| Korea First Brand Awards | 2025 | Male Idol | Vanner | Nominated | |
| K-Stage Awards (Note: An awards ceremony organized and hosted by Naturally Music which advocates introducing K-pop idols to K-pop fans around the world through the K-Stage Untact Concert Series.) | 2021 | Global K-pop Star Award | Vanner | Won | |
| K-Star MVA (Note: A Japan-Korea joint project held by "Idol Champ," a global support app for K-Pop idols, which awards the "Best Artist" who is most supported by global K-Pop fans and the "Next Star" who will carry the future of K-Pop.) | 2023 | Best Artist – Men | Vanner | Nominated | |

=== Honors ===
Name of organization, year given, and the name of the honor
| Organization | Year | Honor | Ref. |
|---|---|---|---|
| Newsis K-Expo Cultural Awards (Note: Established in 2019 and co-sponsored by Korea's Ministry of Culture, Sports and Tourism, Ministry of Foreign Affairs, Korea Creative Content Agency, Seoul Metropolitan Council and the Seoul Tourism Organization, it awards cultural icons, businesses, and individuals who have contributed greatly to Hallyu, the Korean wave.) | 2023 | Next Generation Hallyu Star Award | |
