= 32nd Hanteo Music Awards =

2025 South Korean music award ceremony

- Promotional poster
- Date: February 15–16, 2025
- Venue: Jangchung Arena
- Country: South Korea
- Hosted by: Jinyoung; Miyeon
- Most awards: Tomorrow X Together (4)
- Website: awards.hanteo.com

Television/radio coverage
- Network: Broadcast: Mnet; Streaming: BIGC; TVING

The 32nd Hanteo Music Awards (Korean: 32주년 한터뮤직어워즈 2024; RR: 32junyeon Hanteo myujig eo-wojeu; lit. '32nd Anniversary Hanteo Music Awards 2024') presented by Hanteo Global is an award show held at Jangchung Arena in Seoul from February 15 to 16, 2025. It recognized the best artists and recordings, primarily based on Hanteo Chart data gathered from January 1 to December 31, 2024.

== Criteria ==
All songs and albums that are eligible to be nominated must be released from January to December 2024.

Category	Hanteo Global score (Note: Hanteo Global score reflects a comprehensive analysis based on the vast amount of big data of albums/records, digital music, social media, portals, broadcasting & media, and end users collected through 'Hanteo Chart' and 'Whosfan Big Data Lab.)	Global voting score	Judging score
Grand Prize (Note: Consists of Best Artist, Best Album, Best Song, and Best Performance)	50%	20%	30%
Categories by Artist (Note: Consists of Artist of the Year, Post Generation, Emerging Artist, and Rookie of the Year)	40%	30%	30%
Special Genre Award (Note: Consists of Special Award – Ballad, Special Award – Band, Special Award – Hip-hop, and Special Award – Trot)	30%	40%	30%
Global Artist Award	50%	50%	—N/a
WhosFandom Award	—N/a	100%	—N/a

== Performers ==
The first line-up of performers were announced on January 23. The second and final line-up were announced on February 4.

=== Day 1 (February 15) ===
Performances for Day 1
Artist(s)	Song(s) Performed
Artms	"Virtual Angel"
Nowadays	"OoWee" "Let's Get It"
Say My Name	"WaveWay" "Goldilocks Water"
TripleS	"Girls Never Die"
Lee Mu-jin	"Ordinary Confession" "Coming of Age Ceremony"
Yeonjun	"Ggum"
Epex	"Sunshower" "Universe"
Minnie	"Her" "Cherry Sky"
Kim Jae-joong	"Devotion" "Glorious Day"
Nowadays; Epex; Artms; TripleS; Say My Name	Dance Cover Tribute Medley "Please Look at Me" "T.O.P. (Twinkling of Paradise)" "So Hot" "Boss" "Mister" (with Nicole)
Tomorrow X Together	"Deja Vu" "Over the Moon"
Insooni	"Goose's Dream" (with Oh Ji-yul and Kim Jae-joong) "Happy"

=== Day 2 (February 16) ===
Performances for Day 2
Artist(s)	Song(s) Performed
Young Posse; 8Turn; Lightsum	Dance Cover Tribute Medley "Boy with Luv" "Just Right" "Into the New World"
Evnne	"Badder Love" "Hot Mess"
8Turn	"Like A Friend"
Young Posse	"XXL"
HYB (Note: HYB is a collaborative project consisting of Huh Gak, Shin Young-jae, and OneStar)	"Plot Twist" "Love 119" "Fate" "T.B.H" "Promise"
Lightsum	"Honey or Spice" "Pose!"
Riize	"Hug"
NCT Wish	"Wish" "Steady"
Lee Seung-yoon	"Anthem of Defiance"
Yena	"It Was Love" "Nemonemo"
Young Tak	"What Did You Say?" "SuperSuper"
Riize	"Boom Boom Bass"

== Presenters ==
The line-up of presenters was announced on February 6.

=== Day 1 (February 15) ===
- Hwanhee – presented Artist of the Year (Bonsang) and Post Generation Award
- Jeong Sunah and Johan Kim – presented Special Award – Ballad and Global Generation Icon
- Kahi and Nicole – presented Emerging Artist, Blooming Star – Male, and Blooming Star – Female
- Brian Joo and Hwanhee – presented Global Artist – Oceania, Global Artist – North America, and Great Male Artist
- Kwon In-ha – presented Great Songwriter and Global Rising Star
- Andy Lee – presented Grand Wave Musician and The Most Prime Solo Artist
- Brian Joo – presented Artist of the Year (Bonsang) and Top Touring Artist
- Yoon Sang – presented Best Artist (Daesang) and Best Performance (Daesang)

=== Day 2 (February 16) ===
- Jang Woo-hyuk – presented Rookie of the Year – Male and Post Generation Award
- Kim Yong-jun and Soyou – presented Artist of the Year (Bonsang) and Blooming Performance Group
- Lee Hee-jin – presented Emerging Artist and Best Trend Leader
- Muzie – presented Special Award – Band and Special Award – Trot
- Kim Ho-young and JeA – presented Great Female Artist, Hanteo-choice K-pop Male Artist, and Hanteo-choice K-pop Female Artist
- Jang Woo-hyuk and Muzie – presented The Most Prime Group and Great Vocal Group
- Hwangbo and JeA – presented Next Worldwide Artist and Artist of the Year (Bonsang)
- Insooni – presented Best Album (Daesang) and Best Song (Daesang)

== Winners and nominees ==
Winners and nominees are listed in alphabetical order. Winners are listed first and highlighted in bold.

=== Grand Prize ===
Best Artist (Daesang)	Best Album (Daesang)
**Aespa**	**Seventeen – Spill the Feels**
Best Song (Daesang)	Best Performance (Daesang)
**(G)I-dle – "Fate"**	**Tomorrow X Together**

=== Main & Special Awards ===
The list of main categories and genre nominees was announced on December 11, 2024, through Hanteo Music Awards social media posts. Voting opened on the WhosFan and BIGC app on December 23, 2024, and will run until January 12, 2025.

Artists of the Year (Bonsang)	Emerging Artist
**(G)I-dle**; **Aespa**; **Day6**; **Enhypen**; **IU**; **Ive**; **Le Sserafim**; **NCT Dream**; **NewJeans**; **Plave**; **Riize**; **Seventeen**; **Stray Kids**; **Tomorrow X Together**; **TWS**; **Young Tak**; **Zerobaseone**; List of nominated artists: Ateez; Babymonster; Baekhyun; BoyNextDoor; Cravity; Eclipse; G-Dragon; Hwang Young-woong; Illit; Itzy; Jennie; J-Hope; Jimin; Jin; Kep1er; Kiss of Life; Lee Chan-won; Lee Young-ji; Lim Young-woong; NCT 127; NCT Wish; Nmixx; P1Harmony; QWER; Red Velvet; RM; Rosé; Taeyeon; The Boyz; TripleS; Twice; WayV; Yuqi	**Artms**; **Evnne**; 8Turn; Fifty Fifty; Hui; Lun8; Meovv; N.SSign; Nexz; Xikers; Young Posse; Younite
Post Generation Award	Rookie of the Year – Female
**Epex**; **Yena**; BAE173; Billlie; CIX; DKB; Drippin; Kim Hee-jae; Purple Kiss; Tempest; Weeekly; STAYC; Xdinary Heroes	**Illit**; Artms; Babymonster; Badvillain; Candy Shop; Izna; Katseye; Madein; Meovv; Rescene; Say My Name; Unis
Rookie of the Year – Male	Special Award – Ballad
**NCT Wish**; All(H)Ours; ASC2NT; B.D.U; Dxmon; JD1; Nexz; NOMAD; Nowadays; TIOT; TWS; Waker	**Lee Mu-jin**; 10cm; Bol4; Davichi; D.O.; Heize; Kyuhyun; Roy Kim; Taeyeon; Younha
Special Award – Band	Special Award – Hip-hop
**Lee Seung-yoon**; CNBLUE; Day6; Lucy; N.Flying; Onewe; QWER; Xdinary Heroes	**RM**; Crush; Dean; Jay Park; J-Hope; Lee Young-ji; Zico
Special Award – Trot
**Young Tak**; Hwang Young-woong; Jang Minho; Jeong Dong-won; Kim Hee-jae; Lee Chan-won; Lim Young-woong

=== Global Artist & Popularity Awards ===
The list of nominees for Global Artist Award was announced on December 17, 2024, and the voting began on December 23, 2024, until January 12, 2025. The list of nominees for WhosFandom Award was announced through Whosfan official Twitter account on November 28, 2024, and voting for Top 40 started through the platform from December 2 to 5, 2024. while voting for Top 16 to Final commenced on Whosfan app from December 9, 2024, to December 30, 2024. The winner for WhosFandom Award was announced on December 31, 2024.

Global Artist – Africa	Global Artist – Asia
**Ateez**; Chanyeol; Doyoung; Itzy; J-Hope; Jimin; Jin; RM; Taeyong; Wendy; List of longlisted nominees: (G)I-dle; Aespa; Babymonster; Baekhyun; BoyNextDoor; Cha Eun-woo; Cravity; Day6; Eclipse; Enhypen; Epex; Evnne; Fifty Fifty; G-Dragon; Illit; Irene; IU; Ive; Izna; Jaehyun; Jennie; Kep1er; Kiss of Life; Le Sserafim; Lee Young-ji; Lun8; Meovv; N.Flying; N.SSign; Nayeon; NCT 127; NCT Dream; NCT Wish; NewJeans; Nexz; Nmixx; P1Harmony; Plave; QWER; Red Velvet; Riize; Rosé; Seventeen; SF9; Stray Kids; Super Junior-D&E; Taeyeon; The Boyz; Tomorrow X Together; TripleS; Twice; TWS; Tzuyu; Vanner; Wayv; Xikers; Yena; Yeonjun; Yuqi; Zerobaseone	**Plave**; Chanyeol; G-Dragon; Jaehyun; Jimin; Jin; Super Junior-D&E; Taeyong; Tomorrow X Together; Vanner; List of longlisted nominees: (G)I-dle; Aespa; Ateez; Babymonster; Baekhyun; BoyNextDoor; Cha Eun-woo; Cravity; Day6; Doyoung; Eclipse; Enhypen; Epex; Evnne; Fifty Fifty; Illit; Irene; Itzy; IU; Ive; Izna; J-Hope; Jennie; Kep1er; Kiss of Life; Le Sserafim; Lee Young-ji; Lun8; Meovv; N.Flying; N.SSign; Nayeon; NCT 127; NCT Dream; NCT Wish; NewJeans; Nexz; Nmixx; P1Harmony; QWER; Red Velvet; Riize; RM; Rosé; Seventeen; SF9; Stray Kids; Taeyeon; The Boyz; TripleS; Twice; TWS; Tzuyu; Wayv; Wendy; Xikers; Yena; Yeonjun; Yuqi; Zerobaseone
Global Artist – Europe	Global Artist – North America
**Jimin**; Chanyeol; G-Dragon; Itzy; J-Hope; Jin; Taeyong; Tomorrow X Together; Yeonjun; Zerobaseone; List of longlisted nominees: (G)I-dle; Aespa; Ateez; Babymonster; Baekhyun; BoyNextDoor; Cha Eun-woo; Cravity; Day6; Doyoung; Eclipse; Enhypen; Epex; Evnne; Fifty Fifty; Illit; Irene; IU; Ive; Izna; Jaehyun; Jennie; Kep1er; Kiss of Life; Le Sserafim; Lee Young-ji; Lun8; Meovv; N.Flying; N.SSign; Nayeon; NCT 127; NCT Dream; NCT Wish; NewJeans; Nexz; Nmixx; P1Harmony; Plave; QWER; Red Velvet; Riize; RM; Rosé; Seventeen; SF9; Stray Kids; Super Junior-D&E; Taeyeon; The Boyz; TripleS; Twice; TWS; Tzuyu; Vanner; Wayv; Wendy; Xikers; Yena; Yuqi	**Tomorrow X Together**; Cha Eun-woo; Chanyeol; G-Dragon; Itzy; Jimin; Jin; SF9; Vanner; Yeonjun; List of longlisted nominees: (G)I-dle; Aespa; Ateez; Babymonster; Baekhyun; BoyNextDoor; Cravity; Day6; Doyoung; Eclipse; Enhypen; Epex; Evnne; Fifty Fifty; Illit; Irene; IU; Ive; Izna; J-Hope; Jaehyun; Jennie; Kep1er; Kiss of Life; Le Sserafim; Lee Young-ji; Lun8; Meovv; N.Flying; N.SSign; Nayeon; NCT 127; NCT Dream; NCT Wish; NewJeans; Nexz; Nmixx; P1Harmony; Plave; QWER; Red Velvet; Riize; RM; Rosé; Seventeen; Stray Kids; Super Junior-D&E; Taeyeon; Taeyong; The Boyz; TripleS; Twice; TWS; Tzuyu; Wayv; Wendy; Xikers; Yena; Yuqi; Zerobaseone
Global Artist – Oceania	Global Artist – South America
**Yeonjun**; Chanyeol; G-Dragon; Jaehyun; Jimin; Jin; Taeyong; Tomorrow X Together; Twice; Wendy; List of longlisted nominees: (G)I-dle; Aespa; Ateez; Babymonster; Baekhyun; BoyNextDoor; Cha Eun-woo; Cravity; Day6; Doyoung; Eclipse; Enhypen; Epex; Evnne; Fifty Fifty; Illit; Irene; Itzy; IU; Ive; Izna; J-Hope; Jennie; Kep1er; Kiss of Life; Le Sserafim; Lee Young-ji; Lun8; Meovv; N.Flying; N.SSign; Nayeon; NCT 127; NCT Dream; NCT Wish; NewJeans; Nexz; Nmixx; P1Harmony; Plave; QWER; Red Velvet; Riize; RM; Rosé; Seventeen; SF9; Stray Kids; Super Junior-D&E; Taeyeon; The Boyz; TripleS; TWS; Tzuyu; Vanner; Wayv; Xikers; Yena; Yuqi; Zerobaseone	**Rosé**; Cha Eun-woo; Chanyeol; G-Dragon; J-Hope; Jimin; Jin; Taeyong; Tomorrow X Together; Tzuyu; List of longlisted nominees: (G)I-dle; Aespa; Ateez; Babymonster; Baekhyun; BoyNextDoor; Cravity; Day6; Doyoung; Eclipse; Enhypen; Epex; Evnne; Fifty Fifty; Illit; Irene; Itzy; IU; Ive; Izna; Jaehyun; Jennie; Kep1er; Kiss of Life; Le Sserafim; Lee Young-ji; Lun8; Meovv; N.Flying; N.SSign; Nayeon; NCT 127; NCT Dream; NCT Wish; NewJeans; Nexz; Nmixx; P1Harmony; Plave; QWER; Red Velvet; Riize; RM; Seventeen; SF9; Stray Kids; Super Junior-D&E; Taeyeon; The Boyz; TripleS; Twice; TWS; Vanner; Wayv; Wendy; Xikers; Yena; Yeonjun; Yuqi; Zerobaseone
WhosFandom Award – Female	WhosFandom Award – Male
**Oh My Girl – Miracle**; List of nominees: (G)I-dle – Neverland; Aespa – My; Artms – Ourii; Babymonster – Monstiez; Bibi – Bibitan; Billlie – Belllie've; Blackpink – Blink; Chuu – Kkoti; Dreamcatcher – Insomnia; Fifty Fifty – Tweny; Fromis 9 – Flover; Girls' Generation – Sone; Illit – Gllit; Itzy – Midzy; IU – UAENA; Ive – Dive; Izna – Naya; Kep1er – Kep1ian; Kiss of Life – Kissy; Le Sserafim – Fearnot; Lee Young-ji – Sepo; Loossemble – C.Loo; Mamamoo – Moomoo; Meovv – Meovv's Fan; NewJeans – Bunnies; Nmixx – Nswer; QWER – Bawige; Red Velvet – ReVeluv; Say My Name – LOVvmE; Soojin – Seotang; STAYC – Swith; Sunmi – Miya-ne; TripleS – WAV; Twice – Once; Unis – EverAfter; Viviz – Na.V; Yena – Jigumi; Young Posse – Teleposse; Younha – Y.Holics	**Lim Young-woong – Hero Generation**; List of nominees: Astro – Aroha; Ateez – Atiny; BoyNextDoor – OneDoor; BTS – A.R.M.Y; Cravity – Luvity; Crush – CrushBomb; Day6 – My Day; Drippin – Dreamin; Eclipse – Capella; Enhypen – Engene; Epex – Zenith; Evnne – Ennve; Exo – Exo-L; Hwang Young-woong – Paradise; Jeong Dong-won – UJCDW; Lee Chan-won – Chan's; Lun8 – LUV8; N.Flying – N.Fia; N.SSign – Cosmo; NCT – NCTzen; Nowadays – Day_And; P1Harmony – P1ece; Plave – Plli; Riize – Briize; Seventeen – Carat; SF9 – Fantasy; Shinee – Shinee World; Stray Kids – Stay; Super Junior – E.L.F; The Boyz – The B; Tomorrow X Together – Moa; Treasure – Treasure Maker; TWS – 42; Vanner – VVS; Xdinary Heroes – Villains; Xikers – Roady; Young Tak – Yong Tak & Blues; Zerobaseone – Zerose; Zico – Common

=== Other Awards ===
List of winners for the special awards
Best Trend Leader	Blooming Performance Group
Riize	Young Posse
Blooming Star – Female	Blooming Star – Male
Say My Name	Nowadays
Global Generation Icon	Global Rising Star
(G)I-dle	TripleS
Grand Wave Musician	Great Female Artist
Kim Jae-joong	Yena
Great Male Artist	Great Songwriter
Kim Jae-joong	Lee Mu-jin
Great Vocal Group	Hanteo-choice K-pop Female Artist
HYB	Lightsum
Hanteo-choice K-pop Male Artist	Infinite Inspiring Icon
8Turn	Insooni
The Most Prime Group	The Most Prime Solo Artist
Riize	Minnie
Next Worldwide Artist	Top Touring Artist
NCT Wish	Tomorrow X Together

== Multiple awards ==
The following artist(s) received two or more awards:

Count	Artist(s)
4	Tomorrow X Together
3	(G)I-dle
3	Riize
2	Aespa
2	Ateez
2	Kim Jae-joong
2	Lee Mu-jin
2	NCT Wish
2	Plave
2	Seventeen
2	Yena
2	Young Tak
