= NTX (group) =

South Korean boy band

- Origin: Seoul, South Korea
- Genre: K-pop
- Years active: 2021–present
- Label: Victory Company
- Members: Hyeongjin; Yunhyeok; Xiha; Changhun; Hojun; Rawhyun; Eunho; Seungwon
- Past members: Gihyun; Jiseong

NTX (Korean: 엔티엑스) is a South Korean boy band formed by Victory Company. The group currently has 8 members: Hyeongjin, Yunhyeok, Xiha, Changhun, Hojun, Rawhyun, Eunho, and Seungwon. NTX officially debuted on March 30, 2021, with their lead single "Kiss The World" from their debut EP Full of Lovescapes.

== History ==
=== Pre-debut activities: The Opening ===
Seungwon was a child model, actor and a former member of the kid group 'USS.O Boy' under the stage name 'U.Win'. Eunho was also a child model.

NTX released a series of pre-debut singles to introduce the group named The Opening, starting with The Opening: Public, followed by The Opening: Basic Yell, The Opening: Herma and The Opening: The Finale, the group promoted the lead singles on South Korean music programs.

The group were originally scheduled to debut in January, but due to the aftermath of COVID-19, their debut was postponed.

=== 2021–2024: Debut with Full of Lovescapes, TAN, departure of Gihyun, "Latecomer", Peak Time, Odd Hour, "X-Present", Hold X and departure of Jiseong ===
On March 30, 2021, NTX made their official debut with their debut EP Full of Lovescapes, with the title track "Kiss The World".

On April 30, 2021, it was announced that the group would have their first standalone mini concert 'For You', to be held on May 29, 2021.

In September 2021, Jiseong appeared on the survival reality show The Wild Idol as a contestant, he ranked 3rd on the final episode, allowing him to debut in the project boy group TAN.

On November 6, 2022, Victory Company announced that Gihyun has left the group for personal reasons.

They later released their first single album Latecomer on November 23.

In 2023, the group appeared on the South Korean reality show Peak Time as Team 2:00, where they made it to the third and penultimate round before being eliminated.

On October 25, 2023, it was announced that NTX will be releasing their first full-length album, Odd Hour, on November 15.

On June 25, 2024, NTX announced that they will be releasing their second mini album, Hold X, on July 9. Four days later, TAN member Changsun announced on TAN's official fan cafe that the group had disbanded. Victory Company later announced that Jiseong will not participate in NTX's upcoming comeback and will be taking time to rest before resuming his activities with the group.

On December 11, 2024, it was announced that Jiseong has left the group and Victory Company due to differences in the directions either party wants to go in.

=== 2025–present: Over Track ===
On January 23, 2025, it was reported that NTX will be releasing their second full-length album in March. On February 18, they announced their second full-length album Over Track, set for release on March 10.

NTX is set to perform in Manila on October 19, 2025, as part of IAM WORLDWIDE 's anniversary show dubbed DOMIN8 along with fellow Korean star Ji Chang-wook and Philippine pop group Bini.

On November 6, 2025, NTX released their new mini album "Proto Type"

== Members ==
Adapted from their Naver profile.

=== Current ===
- Hyeongjin (형진)
- Yunhyeok (윤혁)
- Xiha (시하)
- Changhun (창훈)
- Hojun (호준)
- Rawhyun (로현)
- Eunho (은호)
- Seungwon (승원)

=== Former ===
- Gihyun (기현)
- Jiseong (지성)

== Discography ==
=== Studio albums ===
Title	Details	Peak chart positions	Sales
Title	Details	KOR	Sales
Odd Hour	Released: November 15, 2023; Label: Victory Company; Formats: CD, digital download, streaming; Track listing: 1. "New Slay"; 2. "Holy Grail"; 3. "Drop That"; 4. "Just Friend" (친구라서); 5. "Subway"; 6. "Movement"; 7. "Free Day"; 8. "Switch"; 9. "Memories" (기억); 10. "Scream"; 11. "Deep"; 12. "Monopolize"; 13. "Moon's Diary" (달의 일기); 14. "Forever Now" (이대로)	36	KOR: 6,042
Over Track	Released: March 10, 2025; Label: Victory Company; Formats: CD, digital download, streaming; Track listing: 1. "Scoot"; 2. "Over N Over"; 3. "Wassup"; 4. "Stay"; 5. "Mind Box"; 6. "Rabona Kick"; 7. "Like This"; 8. "Sir"; 9. "Memories"; 10. "Take It Easy"; 11. "Over N Over" (English version)	18	KOR: 21,399

=== Extended plays ===
Title	Details	Peak chart positions	Sales
Title	Details	KOR	Sales
Full of Lovescapes	Released: March 30, 2021; Label: Victory Company; Formats: CD, digital download, streaming; Track listing: 1. "Black Hole" (블랙홀); 2. "Hi Star" (하이스타); 3. "Kiss the World" (키스 더 월드); 4. "Choco Ice Cream" (초코 아이스크림); 5. "Magic Shoes" (매직슈즈); 6. "Survive" (서바이브); 7. "Ubimuhwhan" 유비무환; 有備無患); 8. "Choco Ice Cream" (Inst.); 9. "Kiss the World" (Inst.)	86	KOR: 106
Hold X	Released: July 9, 2024; Label: Victory Company; Formats: CD, digital download, streaming; Track listing: 1. "Kick It the Door"; 2. "Problematic"; 3. "Just Once" (그때로); 4. "Ivy Booth"; 5. "Myful"	12	KOR: 17,001
Proto Type	Released: November 6, 2025; Label: Victory Company; Formats: Digital download, streaming; Track listing: 1. "Ice Luv"; 2. "Red Heart"; 3. "Bandz"; 4. "I'm Tired"; 5. "Stupid Melodies"; 6. "Burnout"	20	KOR: 14,732

=== Single albums ===
Title	Details	Peak chart positions	Sales
Title	Details	KOR	Sales
Latecomer	Released: November 23, 2022; Label: Victory Company; Formats: CD, digital download, streaming; Track listing: 1. "Old School" (올드스쿨); 2. "Vintage Girl"; 3. "Old School" (Inst.)	84	KOR: 1,045

=== Singles ===
Title	Year	Album
"Black Hole"	2020	Full of Lovescapes
"Survive"	2020	Full of Lovescapes
"Magic Shoes"	2020	Full of Lovescapes
"Ubimuhwhan" (유비무환)	2020	Full of Lovescapes
"Kiss the World"	2021	Full of Lovescapes
"Old School" (올드스쿨)	2022	Latecomer
"Holy Grail"	2023	Odd Hour
"Problematic"	2024	Hold X
"Over N Over"	2025	Over Track
"Ice Luv"	2025	Proto Type
"Vamos"	2026	Go

== Concerts ==
=== Concert Tours ===
- Live Tour Event in Japan Part1 - The Beginning (2022)

=== Standalone Concerts ===
- For You - NTX Mini Concert (2021)
