= Yoo Hee-jae =

South Korean singer

- 유희재
- Born: February 22, 1994 (age 32); Hannam-dong, Yongsan District, Seoul, South Korea
- Education: Seoul Institute of the Arts; Kaywon High School of Arts
- Occupations: Singer; actor
- Musical career
- Genre: K-pop
- Instrument: Vocals
- Years active: 2016–present
- Labels: JJ Holic Media; Lotus E&M; PCS
- Member of: Sevenus
- Website: https://pcsent.com/artist/masc/

Korean name
- Hangul: 유희재
- Hanja: 柳熙宰
- RR: Yu Huijae
- MR: Yu Hŭijae

Yoo Hee-jae (Korean: 유희재; Hanja: 柳熙宰; born February 22, 1994) is a South Korean singer and actor. He debuted as a member of Masc on August 19, 2016, under JJ Holic Media and Lotus E&M. The group was subsequently disbanded on October 18, 2020. In 2023, Heejae participated in JTBC's reality competition show, Peak Time, as Team 7:00 with his former group member Ireah and achieved second place. In May 2023, Heejae and Ireah signed an exclusive contract with PCS Entertainment and started a new journey as a duo named Sevenus.

== History ==
=== Early life and education ===
Yoo graduated from the Department of Drama and Film in Kaywon High School of Arts. While studying at the Theater and Film Department of Seoul Institute of the Arts, he starred in independent film I am a Vampire, which was directed by 26, a former member of Masc. Following this experience, Yoo began his career as an idol. During his college years, he joined a dance club to develop a new skill, which sparked his interest in combining dance and music.

=== 2016–2022: Debut with Masc ===
On August 19, 2016, Yoo debuted as the lead vocalist of four-member idol group Masc with the EP Strange.

On October 18, 2020, the group disbanded.

Yoo enlisted for the mandatory service after Masc's disbandment, and was discharged in 2022.

=== 2023: Peak Time and Sevenus ===
In 2023, Heejae participated in JTBC's survival reality show Peak Time as part of Team 7:00 alongside fellow group member, Ireah. They secured second place and embarked on the Peak Time Concert Tour as part of the Top 6.

On May 3, 2023, Heejae and Ireah signed an exclusive contract with PCS Entertainment and formed the duo Sevenus. They released their debut single album, Summús, on July 31, 2023.

== Discography ==
=== Singles ===
Title	Year	Album
"I Love You Mom"	2024	Non-album singles
"The Leap"	2026	Non-album singles
"Beyond The Wind"	2026	Non-album singles

== Filmography ==
=== Music video appearances ===
Year	Singer	Song	Notes	Ref.
2016	Sugarbowl	Leaned(기대를 낮출게)	Starred in MV	
2017	Kim Ki-hyun	Dreams Gone Away(꿈이 떠나가다)	Starred in MV	

=== Film ===
Year	Title	Role	Notes	Ref.
2013	I Am A Vampire (나는 뱀파이어다)	Main role	An independent movie directed by former Masc member 26	

=== Television show ===
Year	Title	Network	Role	Notes	Ref.
2023	Peak Time	JTBC	Contestant	Finished 2nd place with Team 7:00	
