= Peak Time =

2023 South Korean reality competition show

- Promotional poster
- Hangul: 피크타임
- RR: Pikeutaim
- MR: P'ik'ŭt'aim
- Genre: Reality competition
- Directed by: Ma Geon-young; Park Ji-ye
- Presented by: Lee Seung-gi
- Starring: (see Contestants)
- Judges: Kyuhyun (lead judge); Jay Park; Kim Sung-kyu; Lee Gi-kwang; Mino (Ep. 1–4); Ryan S. Jhun; Shim Jae-won; Tiffany Young; Moonbyul (Ep. 4–11)
- Country of origin: South Korea
- Original language: Korean
- No. of episodes: 11

Production
- Producer: Yoon Hyun-joon
- Running time: 96–134 minutes
- Production companies: SLL; Studio Slam (Note: A subsidiary label of SLL for unscripted show.); Azing

Original release
- Network: JTBC
- Release: February 15 – April 19, 2023

Peak Time (Korean: 피크타임) is a 2023 South Korean reality competition show. It aired on JTBC from February 15 to April 19, 2023, every Wednesday at 20:50 (KST) for the first two episodes before it changed to 22:30 (KST) from the third episode onwards. It was simultaneously broadcast through TV Asahi and Abema in Japan, and TikTok in other parts of the world, and is also available for streaming on TVING in South Korea and on Viki in selected regions.

Hosted by Lee Seung-gi, the program provided a stage for already debuted K-pop boy bands to once again prove their skills to audiences outside of South Korea and compete for the "Worldwide Idol" title. The final Top 6 teams got the special benefit of having their names disclosed while performing on the show and held a concert. The winning team, Vanner received a monetary prize of ₩300 million, an album release, and a global showcase.

== Background and production ==
=== Development ===
JTBC released a teaser video for Peak Time on June 20, 2022, in hopes of recruiting already debuted K-pop boy bands to participate in the show. Under the supervision of JTBC chief producer Yoon Hyun-joon and production director Ma Geon-young, who were both also involved in the production of the successful reality singing competition show Sing Again, the program aims to revitalize the careers of lesser-known Korean idols, regardless of their debut year. Ma commented that he "wanted to provide a platform" to those "who didn't have a chance to make themselves known to the public."

Lee Seung-gi, who also hosted both seasons of Sing Again, was recruited as Peak Time's host. In regards to choosing Lee, the production team noted his excellent wit and hosting skills during Sing Again, as well as his ability to sympathize well with the contestants, often providing musical advice, being a musician himself.

The panel of judges, consisting of eight people, was announced on December 20, 2022. The production team had enlisted former Sing Again judges Kyuhyun and Mino to be part of the panel, with the former being assigned as the lead judge of the show. The panel also includes Jay Park, Kim Sung-kyu, Lee Gi-kwang, Tiffany Young, SM Entertainment performance director Shim Jae-won, as well as prominent songwriter and producer Ryan S. Jhun. Regarding their roles as judges, Jhun aims to instill the importance of teamwork in the contestants, while Young hopes to impart the skills that she has learned through her experiences as a K-pop idol. Moonbyul joined the panel starting from the second round after Mino stepped down to fulfill his mandatory military service.

=== Broadcast schedule ===
Season	Episodes		Originally released		Time slot
Season	Episodes		First released	Last released	Time slot
1	11	2	February 15, 2023		Wednesday at 20:50 (KST)
1	11	9	February 22, 2023	April 19, 2023	Wednesday at 22:30 (KST)

=== Voting system ===
The official website and Naver NOW app are the primary platforms to vote for the contestants.

The first voting phase was opened to the general public on February 16 after Episode 2 and ended on March 15 after Episode 6. Viewers were allowed to vote for up to eight teams and two individuals daily, regardless of their team membership.

The second voting phase was opened to the general public on March 23 after Episode 7 and will end on April 6 at 09:00 (KST). Viewers were allowed to vote for up to four teams and two individuals daily, regardless of their team membership.

== Contestants ==
The show's contestants were organized into 24 teams, each named after an "hour" on the 24-hour clock (e.g., Team 01:00, Team 02:00, through Team 24:00). With the exception of Team 24:00, each team comprised members of an existing or soon-to-debut K-pop boy band. Team 24:00 was assembled by the judging panel from a pool of individual applicants, or "1-member teams" (Korean: 1인 팀). These ten contestants auditioned without their original group members, who were unable to join due to various circumstances. These individual contestants include Gon from Argon, Heedo from B.I.G, Kim Byung-joo from Xeno-T, Kim Hyun-jae from Black6ix, Kim Shin from Team X, Moon Jongup from B.A.P, Minjae from Spectrum, Minseong from Varsity, Taeseon from TRCNG, and Wontak from Rainz. Applicants not selected for Team 24:00 were eliminated.

On March 6, 2023, allegations of school bullying involving Kim Hyun-jae of Team 24:00 surfaced on a prominent South Korean online forum. He was removed from the show on March 13. In a March 9 statement, the producers condemned school violence and announced a "careful investigation" into the claims to "clearly understand what [had] happened". However, given the complexity of the situation and the time needed for verification, the production team ultimately decided to remove Kim from the program.

On April 7, the production team confirmed that Team 23:00 had voluntarily withdrawn from the show ahead of the second elimination round. The announcement followed the circulation of photos on South Korean forums showing Karam socializing with Japanese adult video actors.

Color key

Winning team
Contestants eliminated during the final round
Contestants eliminated during the second phase of eliminations
Contestants eliminated during the first phase of eliminations
Contestants eliminated during the survival round
Contestants withdrew from the show

List of Peak Time contestants
Team	Identity	Members (Note: Some contestants haven chosen to use their legal names, while other are using stage names.)	Result
Team 01:00	Dignity	Hyeongjin; Luke; Luo; Minseok; On	
Team 02:00	NTX	Changhun; Eunho; Hojun; Hyeongjin; Jaemin; Rawhyun; Seungwon; Yunhyeok	
Team 03:00	In2It	Hyunuk; Inho; Inpyo; Isaac; Jiahn; Yeontae	
Team 04:00	BXB (Note: Participated before their official debut.)	Hamin; Hyunwoo; Jihun; June; Siwoo	
Team 05:00	ATBO	Bae Hyun-jun; Jeong Seung-hwan; Kim Yeon-kyu; Oh Jun-seok; Ryu Jun-min; Seok Rak-won; Won Bin	
Team 06:00	Aimers	Doryun; Eunjun; Seunghwan; Seunghyun; Wooyoung; Yoel	
Team 07:00	Masc	Heejae; Ireah	
Team 08:00	DKB	D1; E-Chan; GK; Harry-June; Heechan; Junseo; Lune; Teo; Yuku	
Team 09:00	Blitzers	Chris; Go_U; Jinhwa; Juhan; Lutan; Sya; Wooju	
Team 10:00	BTL (Note: Participated after their disbandment.)	Joel; Lee Sang-hyun; Lee Hyung-gun; Oh Yun-jun	
Team 11:00	Vanner	Ahxian; Gon; Hyeseong; Taehwan; Yeonggwang	
Team 12:00	Kingdom	Arthur; Dann; Hwon; Ivan; Jahan; Louis; Mujin	
Team 13:00	BAE173	Bit; Doha; J-Min; Junseo; Hangyul; Muzin; Yoojun; Youngseo	
Team 14:00	Ghost9	Choi Jun-sung; Lee Jin-woo; Lee Kang-sung; Lee Woo-jin; Lee Shin (Note: Lee Shin and Prince were not present during the survival round due to contracting COVID-19 a day before the shoot. After recovering, they resumed their activities on the show.); Prince; Son Jun-hyung	
Team 15:00	BLK	Ilkyung; Inho; Sorim; Taebin	
Team 16:00	Romeo	Hyunkyung; Kangmin; Kyle; Seunghwan	
Team 17:00	W.A.O	Changhyun; Donghwa; Filip; Guwon; Hyeongseok; Noa	
Team 18:00	BDC	Hong Seong-jun; Kim Si-hun; Yun Jung-hwan	
Team 19:00	Daydream	Heesoo; Jiho	
Team 20:00	M.O.N.T	Bitsaeon; Roda	
Team 21:00	24K	Imchan; Kiyong; Takeru; Xiwoo; Yuma	
Team 22:00	JWiiver	Chae Gaho; Gabin; JuKang; Rihan; Raots; Roshin; Ryujei	
Team 23:00	The Boss	Injun; Jay; Karam	
Team 24:00	—N/a	Gon; Heedo; Kim Byung-joo; Moon Jong-up	

== Competition rounds ==
=== Survival round ===
Episodes 1 and 2, which were both broadcast on February 15, 2023, encompassed the entirety of the survival round. The results for this round were based solely on the judges' decision. The judges voted for any team whose performance piqued their interest by pressing a "PICK" button. Teams that received between six and eight PICKs automatically advanced to the next round, with a full eight PICKs being called "All PICK", and teams that received three or fewer PICKs were automatically eliminated. Any teams that received between four and five were put on hold until the judges had reached a consensus through further discussions. Full versions of the team performances were uploaded to the official Peak Time YouTube channel, regardless of whether they were previously broadcast or not.

For this round, the 23 teams were divided into three sections: the "Rookie" section (debuted in 2022), the "Booster" section (active groups with at least two or more years of experience), and the "Suspended Activity" section (groups on indefinite hiatus or have disbanded). Instead of using their official group names, the teams performed using new names assigned to them through lottery before the start of the survival round. Each team name represents an hour of the day according to the 24-hour clock notation. The teams are forbidden from disclosing their official group names or agencies until they either get eliminated or reach the final Top 6.

Color key

Passed
On hold, but subsequently passed
On hold, but subsequently eliminated
Eliminated

Team performances
#	Team	Section	Song	PICK	Result	Identity
1.1	Team 14:00	Booster	"Never Ever" by Got7	5	PASS	Undisclosed
1.2	Team 13:00	Booster	"Tiger Inside" (호랑이) by SuperM	7	PASS	Undisclosed
1.3	Team 12:00	Booster	"Shangri-La" (도원경; 桃源境) by VIXX	1	OUT	KINGDOM
1.4	Team 08:00	Booster	"The Real" (Heung ver.) (멋 (흥:興 Ver.) by Ateez	8	PASS	Undisclosed
1.5	Team 21:00	Rookie	"Go Go" by BTS	5	PASS	Undisclosed
1.6	Team 05:00	Rookie	"Growl" by Exo	6	PASS	Undisclosed
1.7	Team 15:00	Suspended Activity	"Beautiful" (아름다워) by Monsta X	6	PASS	Undisclosed
1.8	Team 03:00	Suspended Activity	"Fever" by Enhypen	5	OUT	In2It
1.9	Team 11:00	Booster	"Adore U" (아낀다) by Seventeen	8	PASS	Undisclosed
2.1	Team 02:00	Booster	"No Mercy" by B.A.P	8	PASS	Undisclosed
2.2	Team 18:00	Booster	"Blooming Day" by Exo-CBX	5	PASS	Undisclosed
2.3	Team 07:00	Suspended Activity	"Hello" (여보세요) by NU'EST	8	PASS	Undisclosed
2.4	Team 01:00	Rookie	"Boomerang" by Wanna One	5	PASS	Undisclosed
2.5	Team 09:00	Booster	"Beatbox" by NCT Dream	5	PASS	Undisclosed
2.6	Team 04:00	Rookie	"Replay" (누나 너무 예뻐) by SHINee	5	PASS	Undisclosed
2.7	Team 23:00	Suspended Activity	"Mirotic" (주문) by TVXQ	7	PASS	Undisclosed
2.8	Team 10:00	Suspended Activity	"BTD (Before the Dawn)" by Infinite	0	OUT	BTL
2.9	Team 20:00	Suspended Activity	"Fever" by Park Jin-young	8	PASS	Undisclosed
Unaired	Team 06:00	Rookie	"Ugly Dance" by ONF	Unknown	OUT	AIMERS
Unaired	Team 16:00	Booster	"Juliette" by SHINee	Unknown	OUT	ROMEO
Unaired	Team 17:00	Rookie	"Overdose" (중독) by Exo	Unknown	OUT	W.A.O
Unaired	Team 19:00	Rookie	"Psycho" by Red Velvet	Unknown	OUT	DAYDREAM
Unaired	Team 22:00	Rookie	"Dun Dun" by Everglow	Unknown	OUT	JWiiver

Towards the end of the survival round, the 1-member teams (Korean: 1인 팀) were introduced and performed on stage. After seeing all ten performances, the judges chose the contestants whom they wanted to form Team 24:00.

1-member team performances (Note: Performances by Minjae and Minseong were neither broadcast nor uploaded to the Peak Time official YouTube channel.)
#	Contestant	Song	Result	Identity
2.10	Heedo	"Back Door" by Stray Kids	PASS	Undisclosed
2.11	Kim Shin	"Rush" by Monsta X	OUT	Team X
2.12	Kim Hyun-jae	"Maniac" by Stray Kids	PASS	Undisclosed
2.13	Wontak	"Candy" by Baekhyun	OUT	Rainz
2.14	Taeseon	"Baby" by Astro	OUT	TRCNG
2.15	Gon	"Beautiful" by Wanna One	PASS	Undisclosed
2.16	Kim Byung-joo	"4 Walls" by f(x)	PASS	Undisclosed
2.17	Moon Jong-up	"Anyone" by Seventeen	PASS	Undisclosed

=== First round – Rival match ===
The first round, entitled "rival match" (Korean: 라이벌 매치), took place during Episode 3 and 4, which were aired on February 22 and March 1, 2023, respectively. The judges matched up the remaining 16 teams into eight rival pairs, which were each assigned to either the blue or red corner. Furthermore, each pair received a specific performance theme. The teams were given three weeks to prepare for their performances with the help of experts, which were provided by the show.

The winners were decided by the judging panel. Each judge had a blue and red PICK button, through which they voted for who should win each match. Whenever a tie occurred, which happened between Team 13:00 and Team 14:00, the winning team was decided after a discussion between the judges. The winning team of each pair was awarded a benefit, wherein the cumulative number of votes was doubled at the end of the first voting phase.

Color key

Team in the blue corner won
Team in the red corner won

Rival match results
#	Concept	Corner	Team	Song	PICK	Result
3.1	Synchronization 2 (칼군무 2)	Blue corner	Team 04:00	"Victory Song" (승전가) by Stray Kids	8	
3.2	Synchronization 2 (칼군무 2)	Red corner	Team 01:00	"Maverick" by The Boyz	0	
3.3	Refreshing (청량)	Blue corner	Team 23:00	"Shine" (빛나리) by Pentagon	7	
3.4	Refreshing (청량)	Red corner	Team 18:00	"Beautiful Beautiful" by ONF	1	
3.5	Bad boys (악동)	Blue corner	Team 21:00	"Very Good" by Block B	0	
3.6	Bad boys (악동)	Red corner	Team 20:00	"Go Crazy! " (미친거 아니야?) by 2PM	8	
3.7	Soloists (솔로)	Blue corner	Team 14:00	"I Luv It" by Psy	4	
3.8	Soloists (솔로)	Red corner	Team 13:00	"La Song" by Rain	4	
3.9	Sexy (섹시)	Blue corner	Team 11:00	"Love Killa" by Monsta X	8	
3.10	Sexy (섹시)	Red corner	Team 24:00	"Good Boy Gone Bad" by TXT	0	
4.1	Emotional (감성)	Blue corner	Team 15:00	"12:30" (12시 30분) by Highlight	5	
4.2	Emotional (감성)	Red corner	Team 07:00	"You Are" by Got7	3	
4.3	Synchronization 1 (칼군무 1)	Blue corner	Team 05:00	"Hit" by Seventeen	6	
4.4	Synchronization 1 (칼군무 1)	Red corner	Team 09:00	"On" by BTS	2	
4.5	Girl groups (걸그룹)	Blue corner	Team 08:00	"Bang!" (뱅!) by After School	6	
4.6	Girl groups (걸그룹)	Red corner	Team 02:00	"The Boys" by Girls' Generation	2	

=== Second round – Union match ===
Introduced during the latter half of Episode 4, the second round was announced to be a "union match" (Korean: 연합 매치), or a competition between alliances consisting of four teams. Each alliance was tasked to form three smaller units that would represent their unified team in a four-way battle for the rap, vocal, and dance positions. The rap unit had to have a maximum number of five members, while the vocal unit had to have six members at most. Only the dance unit had no member limit.

The winning unit from each battle was determined by the judges. Each winning unit earned 2% of the total cumulative votes that had accumulated by the end of the first phase of voting. These additional votes were awarded to the entirety of the alliance that the winning unit was associated with. An MVP was also chosen from each battle. Determined by 25 guest judges, the MVPs earned 5% of the total cumulative votes, which was added to their respective team's total number of votes.

During the formation of the alliances, Teams 09:00, 20:00, and 11:00 were given the chance to select three teams to join them, forming Alliances A, B, and C, respectively. Teams that were not chosen in the end–namely, Teams 01:00, 04:00, 07:00, and 21:00–formed the last alliance, Alliance D. However, Team 11:00 was given the ability to switch Team 14:00 from Alliance B with Team 21:00 from Alliance D after being chosen by the majority of the 16 teams as the overall winner of the first round.

Unified teams for the union match
Alliance A	Alliance B	Alliance C	Alliance D
Team 02:00	Team 08:00	Team 11:00	Team 01:00
Team 05:00	Team 20:00	Team 13:00	Team 04:00
Team 09:00	Team 21:00	Team 15:00	Team 07:00
Team 18:00	Team 23:00	Team 24:00	Team 14:00

All alliances had three days and two nights to prepare for their performances. In each unit, members picked their leader and center, who would showcase the highlight of their performance. The performances aired during Episodes 5 and 6, which broadcast on March 8 and 15, respectively.

Color key

Winning alliance unit

Union match results
#	Alliance	Song	Result	MVP
Rap unit performances
5.1	C	"My Bag" by I-dle	761	J-Min (Team 13:00)
5.2	A	"If I Die Tomorrow" by Beenzino	713	J-Min (Team 13:00)
5.3	D	"Fiancé" (아낙네) by Mino	691	J-Min (Team 13:00)
5.4	B	"Dang Dang Dang" (땡땡땡) by Supreme Team	790	J-Min (Team 13:00)
Vocal unit performances
5.5	C	"Way Back Home" (집으로 가는 길) by BtoB	719	Choi Jun-sung (Team 14:00)
6.1	A	"Time of Our Life" (한 페이지가 될 수 있게) by Day6	692	Choi Jun-sung (Team 14:00)
6.2	B	"Behind You" by Park Jin-young	709	Choi Jun-sung (Team 14:00)
6.3	D	"My Sea" (아이와 나의 바다) by IU	767	Choi Jun-sung (Team 14:00)
Dance unit performances
6.4	B	"Bang!" by AJR	780	Moon Jong-up (Team 24:00)
6.5	A	"Gimme Gimme" by Johnny Stimson	773	Moon Jong-up (Team 24:00)
6.6	C	"Bad" by Christopher	789	Moon Jong-up (Team 24:00)
6.7	D	"Power" by Little Mix	779	Moon Jong-up (Team 24:00)

=== Third round – Originals match ===
The third round was revealed to be an "originals match" (Korean: 신곡 매치) in Episode 7, which broadcast on March 22. All 16 teams were assigned an original song based on the number of the ball they had drawn after the union match performances. However, only the ten teams that survived the first elimination round performed during the third round performances. The remaining teams were divided into two leagues: League A and League B. Being the teams that ranked first and second during the first elimination round, respectively, teams 13:00 and 11:00 designated the teams' leagues and their order of performance. In each league, a winning team will be determined by the judges and the audience. A PICK vote from a judge is equivalent to 100 points, while a PICK vote from an audience member is equals to 10 points. The winners will earn 3% of the total cumulative votes that will accumulate by the end of the second phase of voting.

Color key

Winning team

Originals match results
#	Team	New song	PICK		Result
#	Team	New song	Judges	Audience	Result
League B
8.1	Team 08:00	"Coco Colada"	800	680	1480
8.2	Team 23:00	"Chamomile" (캐모마일)	800	440	1240
8.3	Team 15:00	"Nothin' without you" (너야)	400	130	530
8.4	Team 13:00	"Criminal"	700	590	1290
8.5	Team 14:00	"Fever"	400	360	760
League A
9.1	Team 02:00	"Circuit"	700	380	1080
9.2	Team 20:00	"Like We've Never Been" (안해봤던것처럼)	600	200	800
9.3	Team 24:00	"Be Mine"	400	570	970
9.4	Team 11:00	"Skyscraper"	800	710	1510
9.5	Team 07:00	"Doesn't Matter"	800	340	1140

=== Final round ===
K-pop top producers took part in producing songs for this round. During this round their identity was revealed, competed with their original name.

Final Round results
#	Production Credit	New Song	Team	Final rank
1	Composition: Ryan S. Jhun, Benjamin Samama, Cory Enemy, Kyle Trewartha, Michael Trewartha; Lyrics: Jessica Yoowon Oh, Ryan S. Jhun, Benjamin Samama, Cory Enemy, Kyle Trewartha, Michael Trewartha	"Prime Time"	Vanner (Team 11:00)	1
2	Composition: Joohoney, Ye-Yo! (Yeyosound); Lyrics: Joohoney, Ye-Yo! (Yeyosound); Arrangement: Joohoney, Ye-Yo! (Yeyosound)	"Turning Point"	DKB (Team 08:00)	4
3	Composition: Cha Cha Malone, Jay Park, Big Naughty; Lyrics: BIG Naughty, pH-1, Jay Park; Arrangement: Cha Cha Malone	"This That Shhh"	B.A.P, Topp-Dogg, (Note: Credited as former member of Topp-Dogg instead of Xeno-T) B.I.G, Argon (Team 24:00)	3
4	Composition: KENZIE, Mike Daley, Mitchell Owens, Adrian McKinnon; Lyrics: KENZIE; Arrangement: Mike Daley, Mitchell Owens	"GT"	BAE173 (Team 13:00)	5
5	Composition: Lee Min-hyuk (HUTA), AFTRSHOK, SeimSame, Joseph K; Lyrics: Lee Min-hyuk (HUTA); Arrangement: AFTRSHOK, SeimSame, Joseph K	"NOIR"	M.O.N.T (Team 20:00)	6
6	Composition: GroovyRoom, GONEISBACK; Lyrics: Shannon, BuildingOwner; Arrangement: GroovyRoom, GONEISBACK	"Wave"	MASC (Team 07:00)	2

== Global ranking history ==
Summary of the teams' rankings
#	Episode 3 (Note: As of February 18, 2023, at 17:00 KST.)	Episode 4 (Note: As of February 25, 2023, at 17:00 KST.)	Episode 5 (Note: As of March 4, 2023, at 17:00 KST.)	Episode 6 (Note: As of March 11, 2023, at 17:00 KST.)	Episode 7	Episode 8 (Note: As of March 25, 2023, at 17:00 KST.)	Episode 10	Episode 11
1	Team 11:00	Team 11:00	Team 11:00	Team 11:00	Team 13:00 ▲5	Undisclosed	Team 11:00	Vanner; Team 11:00
2	Team 24:00	Team 23:00 ▲1	Team 23:00	Team 23:00	Team 11:00 ▼1	Undisclosed	Team 07:00	Masc; Team 07:00
3	Team 23:00	Team 07:00 ▲2	Team 07:00	Team 07:00	Team 23:00 ▼1	Undisclosed	Team 08:00	Team 24:00 ▲1
4	Team 13:00	Team 24:00 ▼2	Team 24:00	Team 20:00 ▲1	Team 20:00	Undisclosed	Team 24:00	DKB; Team 08:00 ▼1
5	Team 07:00	Team 20:00 ▲1	Team 20:00	Team 24:00 ▼1	Team 08:00 ▲2	Undisclosed	Team 23:00	BAE173; Team 13:00 ▲1
6	Team 20:00	Team 13:00 ▼2	Team 13:00	Team 13:00	Team 24:00 ▼1	Undisclosed	Team 13:00 ▲2	M.O.N.T; Team 20:00 ▲1
7	Team 08:00	Team 08:00	Team 08:00	Team 08:00	Team 14:00 ▲2	Team 20:00 ▼3	Team 20:00	
8	Team 18:00	Team 18:00	Team 18:00	Team 02:00 ▲2	Team 15:00 ▲4	Team 13:00 ▼7	Team 14:00 ▲1	
9	Team 14:00	Team 14:00	Team 14:00	Team 14:00	Team 04:00 ▲6	Team 14:00 ▼2	Team 02:00	
10	Team 02:00	Team 02:00	Team 02:00	Team 18:00 ▼2	Team 07:00 ▼7	Team 15:00 ▼2	Team 15:00	
11	Team 15:00	Team 15:00	Team 15:00	Team 21:00 ▲1	Team 05:00 ▲1			
12	Team 05:00	Team 21:00 ▲1	Team 21:00	Team 15:00 ▼1	Team 21:00 ▼1			
13	Team 21:00	Team 05:00 ▼1	Team 04:00 ▲1	Team 01:00 ▲2	Team 02:00 ▼5			
14	Team 09:00	Team 04:00 ▲1	Team 05:00 ▼1	Team 05:00	Team 01:00 ▼1			
15	Team 04:00	Team 01:00 ▲1	Team 01:00	Team 04:00 ▼2	Team 18:00 ▼5			
16	Team 01:00	Team 09:00 ▼2	Team 09:00	Team 09:00	Team 09:00			

=== First phase elimination ===
Color key

Benefit

1st Global Vote Final Tally results
#	Team	Global vote	First round benefit	Second round benefit	Total votes	Notes
1	Team 13:00	293,879.3	587,758.6	674,350.4	890,829.8	Rap MVP
2	Team 11:00	382,482.2	764,964.4	851,556.2	851,556.2	
3	Team 23:00	356,602.8	713,205.6	799,797.4	799,797.4	
4	Team 20:00	313,097.2	626,194.4	712,786.2	712,786.2	
5	Team 08:00	296,580.6	593,161.2	679,753	679,753	
6	Team 24:00	299,468.4	299,468.4	386,060.2	602,539.6	Dance MVP
7	Team 14:00	275,263.5	275,263.5	361,855.3	578,334.7	Vocal MVP
8	Team 15:00	205,861.2	411,722.4	498,314.2	498,314.2	
9	Team 04:00	195,681.1	391,362.2	477,954	477,954	Eliminated
10	Team 07:00	336,661.6	336,661.6	423,253.4	423,253.4	Global PICK
11	Team 05:00	194,016.5	388,033	388,033	388,033	Eliminated
12	Team 21:00	224,253.2	224,253.2	310,845	310,845	Eliminated
13	Team 02:00	292,007.5	292,007.5	292,007.5	292,007.5	Judges PICK
14	Team 01:00	204,636.5	204,636.5	291,228.3	291,228.3	Eliminated
15	Team 18:00	260,282.9	260,282.9	260,282.9	260,282.9	Eliminated
16	Team 09:00	198,814.5	198,814.5	198,814.5	198,814.5	Eliminated

=== Second phase elimination ===
Color key

Benefit

2nd Global Vote Final Tally results
#	Team	Global vote	Third round benefit	Total votes	Notes
1	Team 11:00	792,112	145,962.6	938,074.6	Final six
2	Team 07:00	751,438.4	—N/a	751,438.4	Final six
3	Team 08:00	444,606.8	145,962.6	590,569.4	Final six
4	Team 24:00	574,357.3	—N/a	574,357.3	Final six
5	Team 23:00	467,870.6	—N/a	467,870.6	Withdrew
6	Team 13:00	450,143.9	—N/a	450,143.9	Final six
7	Team 20:00	378,279.4	—N/a	378,279.4	Final six
8	Team 14:00	366,075.8	—N/a	366,075.8	Eliminated
9	Team 15:00	347,673	—N/a	347,673	Eliminated
10	Team 02:00	292,863.2	—N/a	292,863.2	Eliminated

=== Final result ===
Live Vote Final Results
#	Team		Total votes	Notes
1	Team 11:00	Vanner	293,219	Final Winner
2	Team 07:00	Masc	257,826	
3	Team 24:00	—N/a	245,863	
4	Team 08:00	DKB	131,901	
5	Team 13:00	BAE173	127,476	
6	Team 20:00	M.O.N.T	112,361	

== Discography ==
All releases were produced by SLL and Kakao Entertainment. Releases consist of live recordings of a few selected performances from each round.

=== Survival round release ===
Peak Time - Survival Round

Compilation album by Various artists
- Released: February 16, 2023
- Genres: Dance; Ballad
- Length: 22:33

PEAK TIME - Survival Round track listing
No.	Title	Performed by	Length
1.	"No Mercy"	Team 02:00	2:30
2.	"The Real" (Heung ver.)	Team 08:00	2:34
3.	"Hello"	Team 07:00	2:29
4.	"Fever"	Team 20:00	2:35
5.	"Boomerang"	Team 01:00	2:24
6.	"BTD (Before the Dawn)"	Team 10:00	2:05
7.	"Shangri-La"	KINGDOM	2:25
8.	"Never Ever"	Team 14:00	2:47
9.	"Beautiful"	Team 15:00	2:39
Total length:			22:33

=== First round releases ===
PEAK TIME - 1 Round <Rival match> Part.1

Compilation album by Various artists
- Released: February 23, 2023
- Genre: Dance
- Length: 19:38

PEAK TIME - 1 Round <Rival match> Part.1 track listing
No.	Title	Performed by	Length
1.	"La Song"	Team 13:00	2:49
2.	"Maverick"	Team 01:00	3:01
3.	"Victory Song"	Team 04:00	2:59
4.	"Love Killa"	Team 11:00	2:46
5.	"Go Crazy!"	Team 20:00	2:35
6.	"Very Good"	Team 21:00	2:37
7.	"Shine"	Team 23:00	2:48
Total length:			19:38

PEAK TIME - 1 Round <Rival match> Part.2

Compilation album by Various artists
- Released: March 2, 2023
- Genre: Dance
- Length: 8:22

PEAK TIME - 1 Round <Rival match> Part.2 track listing
No.	Title	Performed by	Length
1.	"Bang!"	Team 08:00	2:25
2.	"You Are"	Team 07:00	2:56
3.	"12:30"	Team 15:00	3:00
Total length:			8:22

=== Second round releases ===
PEAK TIME - 2 Round <Union match> Part.1

Compilation album by Various artists
- Released: March 9, 2023
- Genre: Hip hop
- Length: 12:10

PEAK TIME - 2 Round <Union match> Part.1 track listing
No.	Title	Performed by	Length
1.	"Dang Dang Dang"	Rap B Unit	3:12
2.	"If I Die Tomorrow"	Rap A Unit	3:05
3.	"My Bag"	Rap C Unit	2:50
4.	"Way Back Home"	Vocal C Unit	3:01
Total length:			12:10

PEAK TIME - 2 Round <Union match> Part.2

Compilation album by Various artists
- Released: March 16, 2023
- Genre: Ballad
- Length: 5:51

PEAK TIME - 2 Round <Union match> Part.2 track listing
No.	Title	Performed by	Length
1.	"Time of Our Life"	Vocal A Unit	2:49
2.	"Behind You"	Vocal B Unit	3:01
Total length:			5:51

=== Third round releases ===
PEAK TIME - 3 Round <Originals match>

Compilation album by Various artists
- Released: March 23, 2023
- Genre: Dance
- Length: 53:49

PEAK TIME - 3 Round <Originals match> track listing
No.	Title	Performed by	Length
1.	"Re-Zero"	Dignity	3:20
2.	"Circuit"	Team 02:00	3:22
3.	"Hola!"	BXB	3:10
4.	"Text Me (1052)"	ATBO	3:39
5.	"Doesn't Matter"	Team 07:00	3:18
6.	"Coco Colada"	Team 08:00	3:32
7.	"S.O.D.A."	Blitzers	3:15
8.	"Skyscraper"	Team 11:00	3:25
9.	"Criminal"	Team 13:00	3:06
10.	"Fever"	Team 14:00	3:14
11.	"Nothin' without you"	Team 15:00	3:09
12.	"Thunder(Urr)"	BDC	3:24
13.	"Like We've Never Been"	Team 20:00	3:21
14.	"Step By Step"	24K	3:34
15.	"Chamomile"	Team 23:00	3:17
16.	"Be Mine"	Team 24:00	3:43
Total length:			53:49

=== Final round release ===
Peak Time - Final Round

Compilation album by Various artists
- Released: April 20, 2023
- Genre: Dance
- Length: 23:30

PEAK TIME - Final Round track listing
No.	Title	Performed by	Length
1.	"WAVE (Prod. GroovyRoom)"	MASC	3:12
2.	"Turning Point (Prod. JOOHONEY)"	DKB	2:49
3.	"Prime Time (Prod. Ryan S. Jhun)"	VANNER	3:30
4.	"GT (Prod. KENZIE)"	BAE173	3:40
5.	"NOIR (Prod. LEE MINHYUK (HUTA))"	M.O.N.T	3:12
6.	"This That Shhh (Prod. Jay Park)"	Team 24:00	3:33
7.	"NXT2U (Prod. Tiffany Young)"	NTX, Ghost9, Taebeen, Ilkyung	3:30
Total length:			23:30

== Reception ==
=== Audience response ===
Peak Time has become one of the "most viral TV show[s] in South Korea" after three episodes. Viewers noted that what sets the show apart from other competition series is "the cast's sincerity and passion for music".

=== Ratings ===
After the broadcast of the first three episodes, Peak Time reached Rakuten Viki's top 10 most watched shows in 14 countries, including United States, Canada, Bulgaria, Norway, and Australia.

Average TV viewership ratings
Ep.	Original broadcast date	Average audience share (Nielsen Korea)	
Ep.	Original broadcast date	Nationwide	Seoul
1	February 15, 2023	1.298% (27th)	1.6% (NR)
2	February 15, 2023	1.242% (28th)	1.5% (NR)
3	February 22, 2023	1.113% (26th)	1.6% (NR)
4	March 1, 2023	0.753% (46th)	N/A
5	March 8, 2023	0.751% (34th)	N/A
6	March 15, 2023	0.718% (32nd)	N/A
7	March 22, 2023	0.602% (36th)	N/A
8	March 29, 2023	0.493% (40th)	N/A
9	April 5, 2023	0.479% (49th)	N/A
10	April 12, 2023	0.525% (41st)	N/A
11	April 19, 2023	0.493% (36th)	N/A
Average		0.770%	1.6% (Note: This average rating is calculated based on the published ratings, the exact average ratings is unknown due to multiple ratings not published.)
In this table, blue numbers represent the lowest ratings and red numbers represent the highest ratings.; N/A denotes ratings that were not published.; NR denotes that the show did not rank in the top 10 daily programs on that date.; This show aired on a cable channel/pay TV which normally has a relatively smaller audience compared to free-to-air TV/public broadcasters (KBS, SBS, MBC, and EBS).

== Aftermath ==
=== Peak Time Concert: Your Time ===
Date	City	Country	Venue	Line-up
May 5–7, 2023	Seoul	South Korea	Jamsil Indoor Gymnasium	Top 6
June 24–25, 2023	Busan	South Korea	KBS Busan Hall	Top 6
July 15, 2023	Taipei	Taiwan	Taipei International Convention Center	Vanner, Sevenus, M.O.N.T
July 22–23, 2023	Seoul	South Korea	Korea University Hwajeong Gymnasium	Top 6
September 3, 2023	Macau	China	Broadway Theatre	BAE173, Team 24:00, Sevenus
November 25, 2023	Kaohsiung	Taiwan	Kaohsiung Arena	Top 6
November 28–29, 2023	Yokohama	Japan	Pacifico Yokohama	BAE173, Team 24:00, DKB
December 9, 2023	Hong Kong	China	Kowloonbay International Trade & Exhibition Centre	Sevenus, Team 24:00, Vanner
March 9, 2024	Saitama	Japan	Sonic City Hall	Vanner, DKB, Sevenus

=== Web shows ===
Year	Title	Notes	Ref.
2023	Play Time		
2023	Pick Time in Peak Time		
2023	Behind Time		
2023	Picnic Time	Reality show featuring the winner of Peak Time, Vanner	
2023	Hidden Time		
2023	Peak-log		
