= M.O.N.T =

South Korean music group

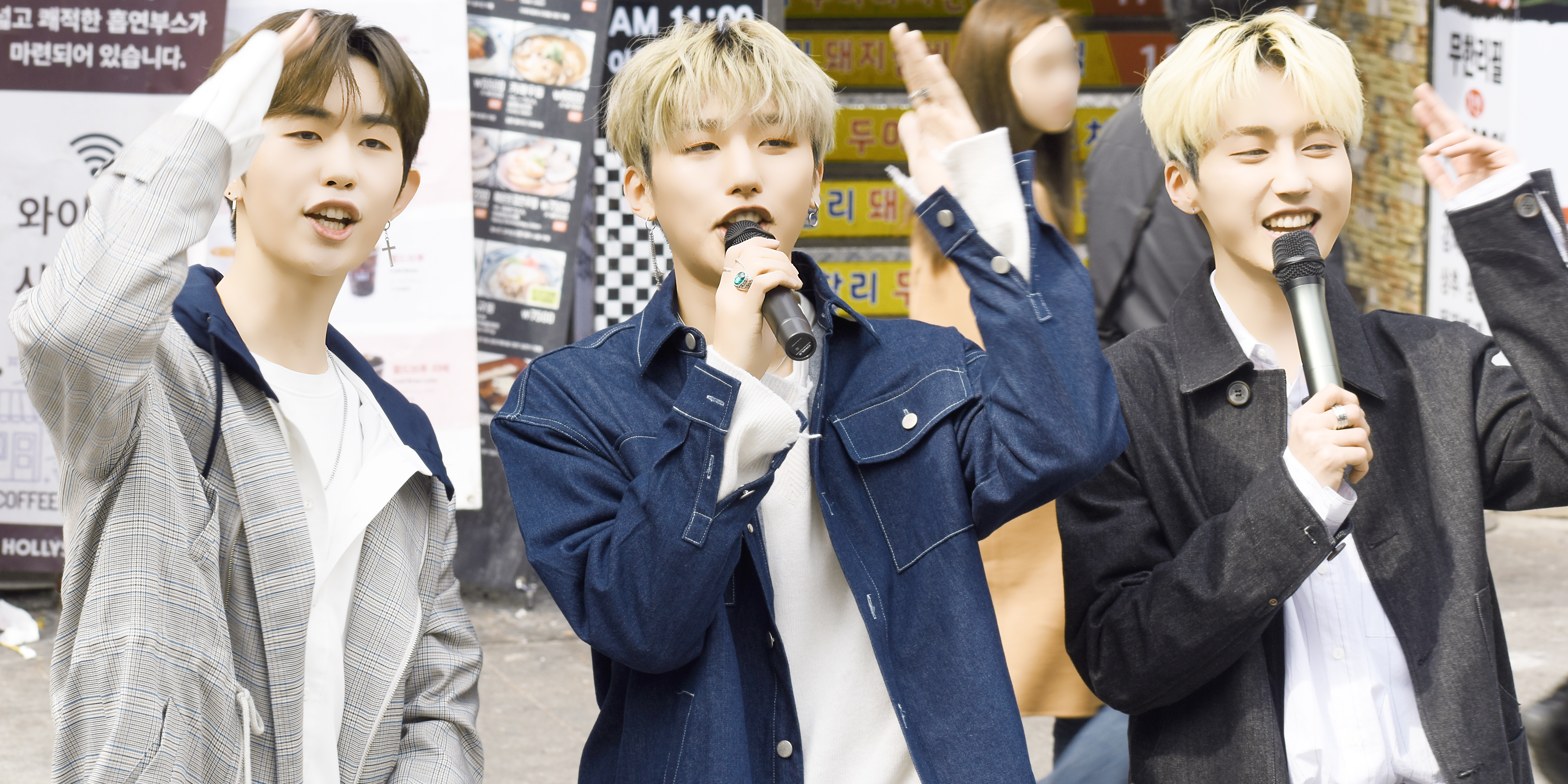
- M.O.N.T busking in Hongdae, March 2019

Background information
- Origin: Ganghwa Island, Incheon, South Korea
- Genres: K-pop, dance
- Years active: 2017–present
- Label: FM
- Members: Narachan; Roda; Bitsaeon
- Website: www.flymusicent.com

M.O.N.T (Korean: 몬트) is a South Korean boy band signed to FM Entertainment. They originally debuted as a trio with leader Narachan, rapper Roda, and main vocalist Bitsaeon. In 2017, M.O.N.T released the digital single "Sorry" and were contestants on JTBC's survival reality show Mix Nine. They released the mini-albums Going Up and Awesome Up in 2019.

== History ==
M.O.N.T is an acronym for Member of National Team, indicating their ambition to become a representative of K-pop. The group consists of three members native to Ganghwa Island. They employed pure Korean words as stage names: Narachan (나라찬; lit. 'a person possessing a sincere heart'), Roda (로다; lit. 'a long-awaited child'), and Bitsaeon (빛새온; lit. 'a new and big light'). M.O.N.T released the future R&B-dancehall single "Sorry" on May 21, 2017, a pre-debut release. The members competed separately on JTBC's survival reality show Mix Nine. Following their stint on the program, the group held music concerts abroad for the following year. M.O.N.T released their first mini-album Going Up and lead single "Will You Be My Girlfriend?" on January 4, 2019, marking their official debut. They held an album showcase on the same day. From March to May, M.O.N.T embarked on a world tour, where they performed in 16 cities across 11 countries.

In midst of the Japan–South Korea trade dispute, M.O.N.T's music video for the patriotic single "대한민국만세" ("Daehan Minguk Mansae") was uploaded in 2019, two days ahead of National Liberation Day of Korea. The lyrics, which utilize pure Korean words, were written by the members and reference territorial dispute over the Liancourt Rocks between South Korea and Japan. They were the first idols to film a music video on the Liancourt Rocks, a group of islets known as Dokdo in the Korean Peninsula. The profits earned from the song via online music stores were donated to "descendants of those who have made contributions to the nation". On October 24, one day ahead of "Dokdo Day", the trio released "The Korean Island Dokdo", followed by its music video.

In 2020, M.O.N.T announced a project called "M.O.N.T. Arena", where they plan to add six new members and form three teams with distinct genres and concepts. Between the teams, the members can form a separate unit consisting of two to nine people. On January 31, 2021, rapper Beomhan was unveiled as the first new member of M.O.N.T. Arena.

M.O.N.T issued their second mini-album Awesome Up! and accompanying single "Rock Paper Scissors" on August 25. Roda designed the artwork on the album's jacket photos. In November, Bitsaeon announced his mandatory military enlistment. During Bitsaeon's absence in 2021, members Roda and Narachan both released solo songs "Anxious" and "Beautiful Sunday", respectively. On April 30, the pair also released the single and music video for "Bottle". At the same time, Narachan also announced his mandatory enlistment to begin in May 2021.

== Musical style ==
M.O.N.T has cited R.ef and Pentagon as their role models. Musically, M.O.N.T's debut album includes dance music, pop ballads, and acoustic tracks.

== Members ==
List of members and roles.

- Narachan (나라찬) – leader
- Roda (로다) – rapper
- Bitsaeon (빛새온) – main vocalist

== Discography ==
=== Albums ===
==== Extended plays ====
List of extended plays, with selected chart positions, showing album title, selected details, and sales
Title	Album details	Peak	Sales
Title	Album details	KOR	Sales
Going Up	Released: January 4, 2019; Label: FM, Kakao M; Formats: CD, digital download; Track listing: 1. Will You Be My Girlfriend? (Original Mix); 2. Sorry; 3. Pain in the rain 4. Thinking of You (Feat. Taru); 5. Will You Be My Girlfriend? (Future bass remix); 6. Sorry (Acoustic Version); 7. Sorry (inst.); 8. Pain in the rain (inst.); 9. Will You Be My Girlfriend? (inst.)	61	KOR: 824
Awesome Up!	Released: August 25, 2019; Label: FM, Kakao M; Formats: CD, digital download; Track listing: 1. Rock Paper Scissors; 2. Bae; 3. Best Friend; 4. Tired	49	KOR: 500
Listen Up!	Released: October 16, 2020; Label: FM, Kingpin; Formats: CD, digital download; Track listing: 1. Boom Bang; 2. Shadow; 3. Anti-Hero; 4. September-Hills (feat. Narachan); 5. Moonlight (feat. Bitsaeon); 6. Lethargy (feat. Roda)	—	
IDGAF	Released: February 27, 2024; Label: FM, Genie Music; Formats: CD, digital download; Track listing: 1. Honestly; 2. IDGAF; 3. Like You; 4. Lucky (Narachan Solo)	42	KOR: 9,815

=== Singles ===
Title	Year	Album
"Sorry"	2017	Going Up
"Will You Be My Girlfriend?" (사귈래 말래; Sagwillae mallae)	2019	Going Up
"Daehan Minguk Mansae" (대한민국만세; Daehanmingungmanse)	2019	Non-album single
"Rock Paper Scissors" (가위바위보; Gawibawibo)	2019	Awesome Up!
"The Korean Island Dokdo" (독도는 우리땅; Dokdoneun urittang)	2019	Non-album single
"Tired" (피곤; Pigon)	2020	Awesome Up
"Boom Bang" (붐뱅; Bumbaeng)	2020	Listen Up!
"Shadow"	2020	Listen Up!
"Anti-Hero"	2020	Listen Up!
"IDGAF"	2024	IDGAF
"When Winter Comes"	2024	Non-album singles
"OMW"	2025	Somewhere Out There
"History"	2026	Non-album singles
"Keep It Slow"	2026	Non-album singles
"Run"	2026	Unlock
