= DKB (band) =

South Korean boy band

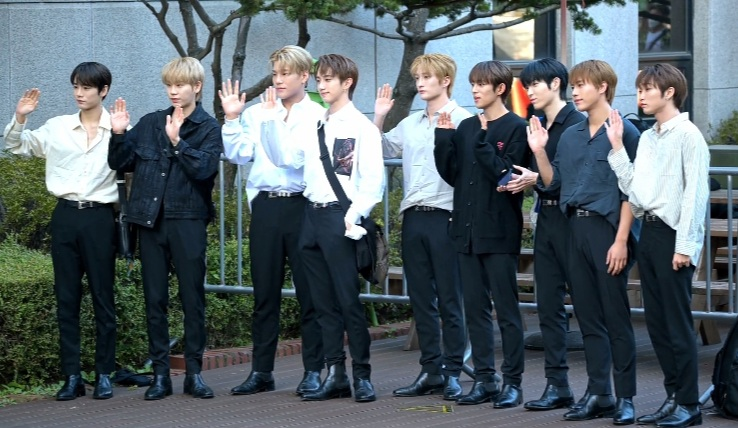
- DKB in September 2022

Background information
- Also known as: Dark Brown Eyes
- Origin: Seoul, South Korea
- Genres: K-pop; hip hop; R&B
- Years active: 2020–present
- Label: Brave
- Members: E-Chan; D1; GK; Heechan; Lune; Junseo; Yuku; Harry-June
- Past members: Teo
- Website: DKB at Brave Entertainment

DKB (Korean: 다크비, pronounced "Darkbe") is a South Korean boy band under Brave Entertainment. The group consists of eight members: E-Chan, D1, GK, Heechan, Lune, Junseo, Yuku, and Harry-June. Originally a nine-member group, former member Teo departed from the group on November 6, 2023, after a drunk-driving incident. The group made their debut on February 3, 2020, with the release of their extended play Youth and its lead single "Sorry Mama".

== History ==
=== 2020–2021: Debut and further releases ===
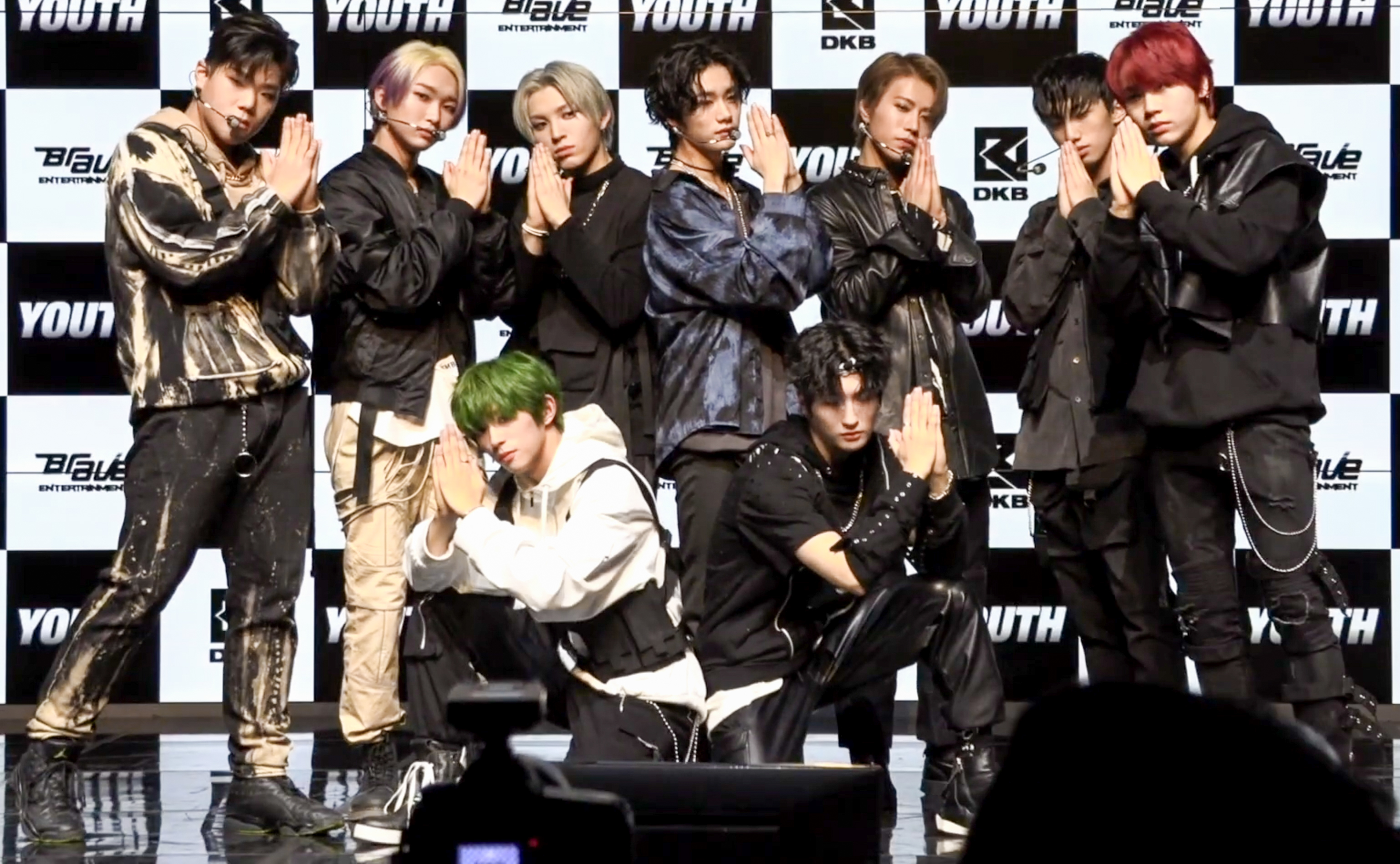
DKB in February 2020

DKB is the first boyband to debut under Brave Entertainment since the debut of Big Star seven years prior. Their name, DKB, is short for "Dark Brown Eyes", meaning that "those who have it will reach out to the world." A representative of Brave Entertainment described the group as "a newcomer who will bring a new breeze to the music industry in 2020." Various teasers were released throughout the second half of 2019 revealing the members of the group.

On January 16, 2020, Brave Entertainment released a teaser image showing nine figures standing against a dark background with red lighting. The image also revealed the title of the EP, Youth, along with its release date, February 3. Youth was released along with its lead single, "Sorry Mama", which was produced by Brave Brothers. The group's debut showcase was held at the Spigen Hall in Gangnam the same day. The EP entered the Gaon Album Chart at number 41 the following week. DKB released their second EP Love, and its lead single "Still" on May 25. On August 13, at the 2020 Soribada Awards, DKB won the "Next Artist Award", their first award since debut. DKB released their third EP Growth and its lead single "Work Hard" on October 26.

=== 2021–present: First studio album and Teo's departure ===
On March 30, 2021, DKB released their first studio album The Dice Is Cast and its lead single "All In". On October 28, DKB released their first single album Rollercoaster and its lead single of the same name.

On April 28, 2022, DKB released their fourth EP Rebel and its lead single "Sober". On August 25, DKB released their fifth EP Autumn and its lead single "24/7".

In February 2023, it was announced that DKB will be included among the 24 contestants in the JTBC idol survival show, Peak Time. DKB was introduced in the show as Team 08:00, as show's contestants were represented with an hour of the day. In the finale, DKB performed Monsta X Joohoney's song titled "Turning Point" and finished at 4th place.

On June 14, 2023, DKB released their sixth EP I Need Love.

On August 14, 2023, DKB released their sixth EP repackage We Love You.

On November 6, 2023, Teo departed from the band due to a drunk-driving incident. The band will continue to promote as an eight-member group.

== Members ==
List of members and their positions, adapted from Brave Entertainment.

=== Current ===
- E-Chan (이찬) – rap, dance
- D1 (디원) – dance, vocal
- GK (지케이) – rap
- Heechan (희찬) – dance
- Lune (룬) – vocals
- Junseo (준서) – dance
- Yuku (유쿠) – dance, vocals
- Harry-June (해리준) – dance

=== Former ===
- Teo (테오) – vocals

== Discography ==
=== Studio albums ===
Title	Album details	Peak chart positions
Title	Album details	KOR
The Dice Is Cast	Released: March 30, 2021; Label: Brave Entertainment; Formats: CD, digital download, streaming; Track listing: 1. "All In" (줄꺼야); 2. "Flower Less"; 3. "Real Love"; 4. "Work Hard" (난 일해); 5. "Sorry Mama" (미안해 엄마); 6. "Still" (오늘도 여전히); 7. "Fondue" (퐁듀); 8. "Tell'em Boys"; 9. "Tell Me Tell Me"; 10. "Samsung"	41

=== Extended plays ===
Title	EP details	Peak chart positions		Sales
Title	EP details	KOR	JPN	Sales
Youth	Released: February 3, 2020 (KOR); Re-released: July 29, 2020 (JPN); Label: Brave Entertainment; Formats: CD, digital download, streaming; Track listing: 1. "Youth"; 2. "Sorry Mama" (미안해 엄마); 3. "Go Up"; 4. "Elevator"; 5. "Samsung"	41	—	KOR: 2,006
Love	Released: May 25, 2020; Label: Brave Entertainment; Formats: CD, digital download, streaming; Track listing: 1. "Still" (오늘도 여전히); 2. "Tell'em Boys"; 3. "Fondue" (퐁듀); 4. "Curious" (호기심); 5. "Rose"	12	—	KOR: 8,876
Growth	Released: October 26, 2020; Label: Brave Entertainment; Formats: CD, digital download, streaming; Track listing: 1. "Work Hard" (난 일해); 2. "Tell Me Tell Me"; 3. "Take Care" (잘 지내); 4. "Eraser" (지우개); 5. "No More" (위로X)	25	—	KOR: 7,951
Rebel	Released: April 28, 2022; Re-released: April 11, 2023 (JPN); Label: Brave Entertainment; Formats: CD, digital download, streaming; Track listing: 1. "Sober" (안취해); 2. "Get Away"; 3. "Rollercoaster" (왜 만나); 4. "Sober" (안취해; Remix)	39	29	KOR: 8,806; JPN: 3,770
Autumn	Released: August 25, 2022; Label: Brave Entertainment; Formats: CD, digital download, streaming; Track listing: 1. "Peep My Show"; 2. "24/7" (넌 매일); 3. "Autumn"; 4. "Bubble" (비늣방울; D1 solo); 5. "24/7" (넌 매일}; Inst.)	29	—	KOR: 7,528
I Need Love	Released: June 14, 2023; Label: Brave Entertainment; Formats: CD, digital download, streaming; Track listing: 1. "I Need Love"; 2. "More than 100 Reasons"; 3. "Feeling"; 4. "1 on 1"; 5. "I Need Love (Outro)"	6	23	KOR: 53,422; JPN: 2,098
We Love You	Released: August 14, 2023; Label: Brave Entertainment; Formats: CD, digital download, streaming; Track listing: 1. "Told You" (말했잖아); 2. "All Yours"; 3. "Paradise"; 4. "I Need Love"; 5. "More than 100 Reasons"; 6. "Feeling"; 7. "Told You" (말했잖아; Remix)	17	—	KOR: 30,100
Hip	Released: November 30, 2023; Label: Brave Entertainment; Formats: CD, digital download, streaming; Track listing: 1. "Ghost Ridah (Wow Wow)"; 2. "What the Hell"; 3. "Me, Me & You" (겁이니); 4. "Slush"; 5. "Fireworks" (쏘아 올려	8	—	KOR: 51,198
Urban Ride	Released: July 16, 2024; Label: Brave Entertainment; Formats: CD, digital download, streaming; Track listing: 1. "Star"; 2. "Flirting X"; 3. "Taekwondo"; 4. "Traveler" (나그네; 5. "Let's Dance"	11	38	KOR: 48,962; JPN: 1,219
Emotion	Released: October 23, 2025; Label: Brave; Formats: CD, digital download, streaming; Track listing: 1. "Irony"; 2. "Snake"; 3. "Weekend"; 4. "Cinderella"; 5. "Hello, Goodbye (Rollercoaster)"	17	25	KOR: 39,216; JPN: 1,748
"—" denotes releases that did not chart or were not released in that region.

=== Single albums ===
Title	Album details	Peak chart positions	Sales
Title	Album details	KOR	Sales
Rollercoaster	Released: October 28, 2021; Label: Brave Entertainment; Formats: CD, digital download; Track listing: 1. "Rollercoaster" (왜 만나); 2. "Rollercoaster" (왜 만나) (Inst.)	33	KOR: 6,951

=== Singles ===
==== As lead artist ====
Title	Year	Peak chart positions	Album
Title	Year	KOR Down.	Album
"Sorry Mama" (미안해 엄마)	2020	—	Youth
"Still" (오늘도 여전히)	2020	—	Love
"Work Hard" (난 일해)	2020	—	Growth
"All In" (줄꺼야)	2021	—	The Dice Is Cast
"Rollercoaster" (왜 만나)	2021	—	Rollercoaster
"Sober" (안취해)	2022	—	Rebel
"24/7" (넌 매일)	2022	—	Autumn
"I Need Love"	2023	108	I Need Love
"All Yours"	2023	196	We Love You
"Told You"	2023	—	We Love You
"What the Hell"	2023	100	Hip
"Flirting X"	2024	74	Urban Ride
"Irony"	2025	127	Emotion

==== Compilation appearances ====
Title	Year	Album
"City Escape" (도시탈출)	2021	Immortal Songs: 2021 Hope Application Song Special
"The Real" (Heung ver.) (멋(흥: 興 ver)) (orig. song by Ateez)	2023	Peak Time – Survival Round
"Bang!" (orig. song by After School)	2023	Peak Time – 1 Round <Rival match> Pt.2
"Coco Colada"	2023	Peak Time – 3 Round <Originals match>
"Turning Point" (Prod. Joohoney)	2023	Peak Time – <Final Round>

== Awards and nominations ==
Name of the award ceremony, year presented, category, nominee of the award, and the result of the nomination
Award ceremony	Year	Category	Nominee / Work	Result	Ref.
Asia Artist Awards	2021	Focus Singer Award	DKB	Won	
