= List of Produce X 101 contestants =

Produce X 101 is a South Korean reality television show that aired in 2019. The show began with 101 contestants, and the public voted on which to include in an eleven-member boy band.

== Contestants ==
The spelling of names in English is according to the official website. The Korean contestants are presented in Eastern order (family name, given name). The age listed is according to the Korean age system at the start of the competition. The new X rank means the contestants are the least prepared, and are the most vulnerable to be eliminated.

Color key

Left the show
Eliminated in Episode 5
Eliminated in Episode 8
Eliminated in Episode 8, but saved
Eliminated in Episode 11
Eliminated in Episode 12
Final members of X1
Top 10 Of The Week

Company	Name	Age	Judges evaluation		Ranking													
Company	Name	Age	Judges evaluation		Ep.1	Ep.2	Ep.3	Episode 5		Ep.6	Episode 8		Episode 11		Episode 12		Total No. of Votes	Final
Company	Name	Age	1	2	#	#	#	#	Votes ^{21}	#	#	Votes	#	Votes ^{24}	#	Votes	Total No. of Votes	Final
Individual Trainee (개인연습생)	Lee Hyeop (이협)	21	C	C	40	48	52	49	85,520	40	26	418,222	24	Eliminated			503,742+	24
Individual Trainee (개인연습생)	Choi Suhwan (최수환)	19	A	A	56	56	24	24	280,824	28	29	363,605	28	Eliminated			644,429+	28
Individual Trainee (개인연습생)	Kang Seok-hwa (강석화)^{2}	20	C	B	21	29	35	35	156,788	34	35	301,720	Eliminated				458,508	35
Individual Trainee (개인연습생)	Kim Sungyeon (김성연)^{2} ^{15}	18	C	B	54	52	56	59	68,946	49	45	227,444	Eliminated				296,390	45
Individual Trainee (개인연습생)	Lee Eugene (이유진)	16	X	F	7	12	16	27	247,706	53	55	161,710	Eliminated				409,416	55
Individual Trainee (개인연습생)	Lee Hamin (이하민)	24	A	B	50	58	67	63	Eliminated									63
Individual Trainee (개인연습생)	Jung Youngbin (정영빈)	22	B	B	62	61	62	68	Eliminated									68
Individual Trainee (개인연습생)	Park Jinyeol (박진열)	19	C	C	64	64	73	81	Eliminated									81
Individual Trainee (개인연습생)	Im Siu (임시우) ^{17}	21	D	-	51	Left the Show												101
A.CONIC (에이코닉)	Kwon Taeeun (권태은)	21	X	F	74	57	66	46	93,285	32	34	320,834	Eliminated				414,119	34
AAP.Y	Kang Hyeonsu (강현수) ^{20}	24	A	A	79	59	69	40	119,932	22	20	660,757	26	Eliminated			780,689+	26
AAP.Y	Lee Midam (이미담)^{2}	23	B	C	32	30	36	36	148,119	38	37	284,079	Eliminated				432,198	37
AAP.Y	Jung Myunghoon (정명훈)	23	B	C	90	69	71	71	Eliminated									71
Around Us Entertainment	Jung Jaehun (정재훈)	20	A	C	65	66	59	60	68,564	47	39	258,077	Eliminated				326,641	39
Around Us Entertainment	Woo Jewon (우제원)	22	A	B	63	60	55	55	72,957	50	54	163,423	Eliminated				236,380	54
Around Us Entertainment	Choi Sihyuk (최시혁)	20	B	C	69	70	74	79	Eliminated									79
Astory Entertainment (애스토리)	Jeon Hyunwoo (전현우)	23	B	B	35	51	63	64	Eliminated									64
Astory Entertainment (애스토리)	Heo Jinho (허진호)	22	C	B	94	89	93	83	Eliminated									83
Brand New Music	Lee Eun-sang (이은상)	18	A	C	14	2	3	5	931,256	6	6	1,313,074	9	230,716	X	689,489	3,164,535	X
Brand New Music	Kim Sihun (김시훈)	21	B	A	43	17	19	18	350,549	25	24	456,615	27	Eliminated			807,164+	27
Brand New Music	Yun Junghwan (윤정환)	19	A	B	58	18	23	31	212,257	35	38	275,950	Eliminated				488,207	38
Brand New Music	Hong Seongjun (홍성준)	21	B	F	53	23	33	37	143,400	56	51	177,128	Eliminated				320,528	51
C9 Entertainment	Keum Donghyun (금동현)	17	B	C	23	26	30	17	360,277	16	19	680,687	10	187,264	14	674,500	1,902,728	17/8
C9 Entertainment	Lee Jaebin (이재빈)	20	B	C	73	88	91	95	Eliminated									95
Chandelier Music	Kongthap Peak (픽) / (กองทัพพีค)^{3}	19	D	D	34	42	51	58	69,707	51	50	184,282	Eliminated				253,989	50
Cre.ker Entertainment (크래커)	Kwon Heejun (권희준)	19	X	F	44	46	50	53	79,864	52	56	157,020	Eliminated				236,884	56
DS Entertainment	Steven Kim (스티븐 킴)	20	X	D	70	72	79	72	Eliminated									72
DSP Media	Son Dongpyo (손동표)	18	B	A	6	6	7	7	710,483	12	11	1,049,918	12	178,034	6	824,389	2,762,824	6
DSP Media	Lee Hwan (이환)	21	B	B	46	49	60	67	Eliminated									67
DSP Media	Lee Junhyuk (이준혁)	20	C	A	68	65	75	75	Eliminated									75
E Entertainment	Won Hyuk (원혁)	18	B	D	83	99	57	57	70,759	48	33	337,662	Eliminated				408,421	33
E Entertainment	Lee Wonjun (이원준)	18	B	D	77	83	43	44	110,290	36	47	220,555	Eliminated				330,845	47
ESteem	Park Yuri (유리)	26	B	D	33	34	27	29	216,426	33	40	246,067	Eliminated				462,493	40
ESteem	Timothée Anzardi (앙자르디 디모데)	21	X	F	49	53	61	61	Eliminated									61
ESteem	Kim Jingon (김진곤)	22	X	D	61	55	65	62	Eliminated									62
ESteem	Kim Seunghwan (김승환)	21	X	F	81	80	83	89	Eliminated									89
Enfant Terrible Company (앙팡테리블)	Choi Byunghoon (최병훈)	20	D	F	91	94	97	98	Eliminated									98
Fantagio (판타지오)	Han Gichan (한기찬)	22	X	C	16	22	25	33	196,506	46	57	151,694	Eliminated				348,200	57
Gost Entertainment	Lee Sangho (이상호)	23	X	X	95	90	96	88	Eliminated									88
Gost Entertainment	Yun Hyunjo (윤현조)	23	X	F	98	81	90	96	Eliminated									96
Happy Face Entertainment (해피페이스)	Won Hyunsik (원현식)	23	C	D	72	73	76	77	Eliminated									77
HONGYI Entertainment	Tony Yu (토니) / (余景天)	18	A	F	55	44	21	20	326,901	24	27	410,110	19	127,321	20	284,789	1,149,121	20
HONGYI Entertainment	Wei Ziyue (위자월) / (魏子越)^{4}	22	C	F	31	43	31	34	171,595	45	43	235,848	Eliminated				407,443	43
iME Korea	Lee Sejin (이세진)	24	X	F	8	14	13	13	459,837	20	21	632,247	20	125,530	18	464,655	1,682,269	19
JH1	Jun Uehara (우에하라 준) / (上原潤)	24	D	C	88	96	82	91	Eliminated									91
Jellyfish Entertainment (젤리피쉬)	Kim Minkyu (김민규)	19	X	D	1	3	2	2	1,033,132	3	10	1,238,668	5	290,944	17	472,150	3,034,894	12
Jellyfish Entertainment (젤리피쉬)	Choi Junseong (최준성)	18	B	D	59	63	40	39	120,879	41	46	221,745	Eliminated				342,624	46
JYP Entertainment	Yoon Seobin (윤서빈)^{18}	21	C	X	12	Left the Show												100
Kiwi Media Group (키위미디어그룹)	Song Changha (송창하)	20	C	C	71	74	78	73	Eliminated									73
Kiwi Media Group (키위미디어그룹)	Kim Hyungmin (김형민)	21	D	C	97	79	89	90	Eliminated									90
Kiwi Media Group (키위미디어그룹)	Lim Dahun (임다훈)	20	C	D	100	91	98	97	Eliminated									97
Krazy Entertainment (크레이지)	Kim Kwanwoo (김관우)	23	D	D	80	75	80	80	Eliminated									80
Maroo Entertainment (마루기획)	Lee Jinwoo (이진우)	16	C	B	10	19	14	12	493,042	4	8	1,259,112	22	111,882	Eliminated		1,864,036	22
Maroo Entertainment (마루기획)	Lee Woojin (이우진)	17	X	F	52	71	54	50	84,822	42	41	244,979	Eliminated				329,801	41
Maroo Entertainment (마루기획)	Lee Taeseung (이태승)	17	X	F	26	47	47	48	86,239	55	53	166,787	Eliminated				253,026	53
MBK Entertainment	Lee Hangyul (이한결)^{7}	21	C	D	41	28	28	21	326,482	17	15	928,085	16	172,067	7	794,411	2,221,045	7
MBK Entertainment	Nam Dohyon (남도현)^{6}	16	A	D	37	4	5	6	844,597	7	7	1,265,468	7	272,795	8	764,443	3,147,303	8
MBK Entertainment	Kim Yeongsang (김영상)^{5}	23	D	F	93	50	58	65	Eliminated									65
Million Market (밀리언마켓)	Yoo Gunmin (유건민)	22	C	D	101	77	68	70	Eliminated									70
MLD Entertainment	Kim Dongbin (김동빈)^{8}	19	B	C	18	16	17	26	267,398	37	42	238,545	Eliminated				505,943	42
Music Works (뮤직웍스)	Song Yuvin (송유빈)^{9}	22	A	A	17	5	8	8	679,286	9	12	1,015,134	17	152,724	16	479,644	2,326,788	15
Music Works (뮤직웍스)	Kim Kookheon (김국헌)^{9} ^{15}	23	A	A	29	13	15	16	361,172	18	22	604,095	21	Eliminated			965,267+	21
NEST Entertainment	Park Yoonsol (박윤솔)^{19}	24	C	A	82	84	49	43	110,322	43	48	215,650	Eliminated				325,972	48
NEST Entertainment	Oh Saebom (오새봄)	26	C	C	99	76	64	69	Eliminated									69
OUI Entertainment (위)	Kim Yo-han (김요한)	21	A	C	3	1	1	1	1,094,299	5	3	1,458,183	1	582,503	1	1,334,011	4,468,996	1
Plan A Entertainment	Han Seung-woo (한승우)^{10}	26	A	A	39	39	34	30	212,352	13	9	1,248,496	4	329,581	3	1,079,200	2,869,629	3
Plan A Entertainment	Choi Byung-chan (최병찬)^{10} ^{23}	23	A	A	20	25	20	19	329,821	14	16	888,115	Left the Show				1,217,936	31
Plasma Entertainment (플라즈마)	Park Sion (박시온)	18	X	F	84	95	85	93	Eliminated									93
SF Entertainment	Sung Minseo (성민서)	19	D	D	92	82	92	87	Eliminated									87
sidusHQ	Park Sunho (박선호)^{11}	27	B	B	36	8	10	14	417,093	26	28	397,067	25	Eliminated			814,160+	25
Source Music (쏘스뮤직)	Kim Hyeonbin (김현빈)	18	D	A	28	27	29	23	290,830	27	25	432,101	30	Eliminated			722,931+	30
Source Music (쏘스뮤직)	Tsai Chia Hao (채가호) / (蔡家豪)	22	D	D	57	62	72	78	Eliminated									78
Source Music (쏘스뮤직)	Yoon Minguk (윤민국)	18	D	B	96	85	99	92	Eliminated									92
The South (더사우스)	Nam Donghyun (남동현)^{12}	21	A	C	45	40	45	52	80,485	57	60	134,540	Eliminated				215,025	60
Starship Entertainment (스타쉽)	Song Hyeongjun (송형준)	18	X	D	9	10	4	3	1,024,849	2	4	1,418,328	8	242,818	4	1,049,222	3,735,217	4
Starship Entertainment (스타쉽)	Kang Minhee (강민희)	18	X	D	11	20	18	22	311,174	23	23	564,822	14	173,169	10	749,444	1,798,609	10
Starship Entertainment (스타쉽)	Koo Jungmo (구정모)	20	X	F	2	9	9	9	669,616	8	5	1,334,726	15	172,337	12	704,748	2,881,427	13/6
Starship Entertainment (스타쉽)	Ham Wonjin (함원진)	19	D	A	19	15	12	10	578,263	10	14	942,284	18	148,789	19	359,733	2,029,069	16
Starship Entertainment (스타쉽)	Moon Hyunbin (문현빈)	20	D	A	27	36	41	41	115,595	39	32	350,389	Eliminated				465,984	32
Stone Music Entertainment (스톤뮤직)	Kim Sunghyun (김성현)^{13}	24	C	C	22	33	39	42	112,110	44	44	227,987	Eliminated				340,097	44
Think About Entertainment (띵크어바웃)	Kim Junjae (김준재)^{6}	20	X	F	87	86	87	94	Eliminated									94
TOP Media (티오피미디어)	Kim Wooseok (김우석)^{14}	24	B	A	5	7	6	4	933,869	1	1	1,728,930	2	457,477	2	1,304,033	4,424,309	2
TOP Media (티오피미디어)	Lee Jinhyuk (이진혁)^{14}	24	B	A	38	35	32	25	274,197	11	2	1,480,425	3	351,174	11	719,466	2,825,262	14/7
Urban Works Media (얼반웍스)	Byun Seongtae (변성태)	22	D	D	60	67	70	66	Eliminated									66
Urban Works Media (얼반웍스)	Kim Minseo (김민서)	18	D	B	89	87	94	82	Eliminated									82
Urban Works Media (얼반웍스)	Hong Sunghyun (홍성현)	24	B	C	86	98	88	85	Eliminated									85
Urban Works Media (얼반웍스)	Kim Dongkyu (김동규)	20	C	B	76	78	84	99	Eliminated									99
VINE Entertainment (바인)	Baek Jin (백진)^{15}	25	B	F	30	32	42	45	98,209	30	36	284,725	Eliminated				382,934	36
WM Entertainment	Lee Gyuhyung (이규형)	26	C	C	85	97	86	76	Eliminated									76
Woollim Entertainment (울림)	Cha Junho (차준호)	18	C	C	4	11	11	11	499,672	15	13	1,011,352	11	181,445	9	756,939	2,449,408	9
Woollim Entertainment (울림)	Hwang Yunseong (황윤성)	20	B	D	13	24	22	15	397,255	21	18	689,778	13	173,360	15	554,589	1,814,982	18
Woollim Entertainment (울림)	Kim Dongyun (김동윤)^{22}	18	D	B	15	21	26	32	211,787	29	31	354,360	23	96,480	Eliminated		662,627	23
Woollim Entertainment (울림)	Joo Changuk (주창욱)	19	D	B	24	31	37	38	140,627	31	30	357,875	29	Eliminated			498,502+	29
Woollim Entertainment (울림)	Kim Minseo (김민서)	18	X	F	48	54	48	47	87,664	54	52	168,993	Eliminated				256,657	52
Woollim Entertainment (울림)	Moon Junho (문준호)	20	X	F	25	38	44	51	83,743	59	59	148,896	Eliminated				232,639	59
WUZO Entertainment	Choi Jinhwa (최진화)	18	A	D	75	92	81	74	Eliminated									74
YG Entertainment	Mahiro Hidaka (히다카 마히로) / (日高真宙)^{2}	19	D	D	47	45	53	56	71,950	58	49	205,369	Eliminated				277,319	49
YG Entertainment	Wang Jyunhao (왕군호) / (王君豪)^{2}	20	C	F	42	37	46	54	74,073	60	58	150,579	Eliminated				224,652	58
Yuehua Entertainment (위에화)	Cho Seungyoun (조승연)^{16}	24	B	B	67	41	38	28	235,056	19	17	754,435	6	281,580	5	929,311	2,200,382	5
Yuehua Entertainment (위에화)	Hwang Geumryul (황금률)	22	C	B	66	68	77	84	Eliminated									84
Yuehua Entertainment (위에화)	Yu Seongjun (유성준)	19	X	F	78	93	95	86	Eliminated									86

== Group X Battle Performances (Episodes 3-4) ==
Bold denotes the person who picked the team members. Son Dong-pyo, who was center position for the "X1-MA" theme song performance, chose his team first, and the other 7 captains selected by lottery to choose their members afterwards. The songs' artist was chosen by a race. After picking an artist, the captains then chose a song and half of their team to create their final group, with the other half receiving the other song and becoming their opposing group.

(*) denotes the team with the highest score that can perform on M Countdown. All contestants of each winning team received a bonus of 3,000 votes, with the top contestants receiving ten times their votes.

Color key

Winner
Leader
Center
Leader and center

Performance			Team			Contestant				
#	Artist	Song	#	Name	Votes	Position	Name	Votes	Votes with bonus	Rank
1	EXO	"Mama"	1	배배 (BaeBae)	327	Main Vocal	Yoon Seobin^{18}	62	62	59
1	EXO	"Mama"	1	배배 (BaeBae)	327	Sub Vocal 1	Kang Seokhwa	30	30	79
1	EXO	"Mama"	1	배배 (BaeBae)	327	Sub Vocal 2	Tony	24	24	87
1	EXO	"Mama"	1	배배 (BaeBae)	327	Sub Vocal 3	Hwang Yunseong	99	99	51
1	EXO	"Mama"	1	배배 (BaeBae)	327	Sub Vocal 4	Kang Minhee	56	56	63
1	EXO	"Mama"	1	배배 (BaeBae)	327	Rapper 1	Mahiro Hidaka	8	8	99
1	EXO	"Mama"	1	배배 (BaeBae)	327	Rapper 2	Han Gichan	48	48	69
1	EXO	"Love Shot"	2	Oh! 나나 (Oh! NaNa)	517	Main Vocal	Cho Seungyoun	77	3077	24
1	EXO	"Love Shot"	2	Oh! 나나 (Oh! NaNa)	517	Sub Vocal 1	Lee Hangyul	53	3053	33
1	EXO	"Love Shot"	2	Oh! 나나 (Oh! NaNa)	517	Sub Vocal 2	Hong Seongjun	5	3005	50
1	EXO	"Love Shot"	2	Oh! 나나 (Oh! NaNa)	517	Sub Vocal 3	Lee Sejin	87	3087	20
1	EXO	"Love Shot"	2	Oh! 나나 (Oh! NaNa)	517	Sub Vocal 4	Kim Wooseok	210	5100	4
1	EXO	"Love Shot"	2	Oh! 나나 (Oh! NaNa)	517	Rapper 1	Keum Donghyun	50	3050	34
1	EXO	"Love Shot"	2	Oh! 나나 (Oh! NaNa)	517	Rapper 2	Kim Sihun	35	3035	40
2	BTS	"No More Dream"	1*	P.T.S	597	Main Rapper	Hong Sunghyun	113	3113	13
2	BTS	"No More Dream"	1*	P.T.S	597	Sub Rapper 1	Steven Kim	75	3075	25
2	BTS	"No More Dream"	1*	P.T.S	597	Sub Rapper 2	Kim Hyunbin	285	5850	1
2	BTS	"No More Dream"	1*	P.T.S	597	Vocal 1	Won Hyunsik	32	3032	41
2	BTS	"No More Dream"	1*	P.T.S	597	Vocal 2	Kim Sungyeon	80	3080	21
2	BTS	"No More Dream"	1*	P.T.S	597	Vocal 3	Lee Sangho	12	3012	49
2	BTS	"Blood, Sweat & Tears"	2	프듀쏘년단 (PDX)	237	Main Rapper	Lee Wonjun	51	51	65
2	BTS	"Blood, Sweat & Tears"	2	프듀쏘년단 (PDX)	237	Sub Rapper 1	Lee Hwan	32	32	78
2	BTS	"Blood, Sweat & Tears"	2	프듀쏘년단 (PDX)	237	Sub Rapper 2	**Yun Hyunjo**	14	14	96
2	BTS	"Blood, Sweat & Tears"	2	프듀쏘년단 (PDX)	237	Vocal 1	Jeong Youngbin	27	27	81
2	BTS	"Blood, Sweat & Tears"	2	프듀쏘년단 (PDX)	237	Vocal 2	Moon Hyunbin	59	59	60
2	BTS	"Blood, Sweat & Tears"	2	프듀쏘년단 (PDX)	237	Vocal 3	Park Yoonsol	54	54	64
3	Monsta X	"Trespass"	1	피라미드 꼭대기 (Top of the Pyramid)	461	Main Vocal	Yoon Minguk	39	3039	37
3	Monsta X	"Trespass"	1	피라미드 꼭대기 (Top of the Pyramid)	461	Sub Vocal 1	Wei Ziyue	218	5180	3
3	Monsta X	"Trespass"	1	피라미드 꼭대기 (Top of the Pyramid)	461	Sub Vocal 2	Lee Gyuhyung	30	3030	42
3	Monsta X	"Trespass"	1	피라미드 꼭대기 (Top of the Pyramid)	461	Sub Vocal 3	Lee Eugene	111	3111	14
3	Monsta X	"Trespass"	1	피라미드 꼭대기 (Top of the Pyramid)	461	Rapper 1	Yu Seongjun	27	3027	43
3	Monsta X	"Trespass"	1	피라미드 꼭대기 (Top of the Pyramid)	461	Rapper 2	Jung Jaehun	36	3036	39
3	Monsta X	"Dramarama"	2	달콤한 인생 (Sweet Life)	283	Main Vocal	Choi Junseong	15	15	94
3	Monsta X	"Dramarama"	2	달콤한 인생 (Sweet Life)	283	Sub Vocal 1	Oh Saebom	66	66	58
3	Monsta X	"Dramarama"	2	달콤한 인생 (Sweet Life)	283	Sub Vocal 2	Nam Donghyun	84	84	54
3	Monsta X	"Dramarama"	2	달콤한 인생 (Sweet Life)	283	Sub Vocal 3	Yoo Gunmin	56	56	63
3	Monsta X	"Dramarama"	2	달콤한 인생 (Sweet Life)	283	Rapper 1	**Kim Kwanwoo**	27	27	81
3	Monsta X	"Dramarama"	2	달콤한 인생 (Sweet Life)	283	Rapper 2	Kim Donggyu	35	35	76
4	Seventeen	"Adore U"	1	우하화호호호 (WooHaHwaHoHoHo)	233	Main Vocal	Jeon Hyunwoo	30	30	79
4	Seventeen	"Adore U"	1	우하화호호호 (WooHaHwaHoHoHo)	233	Sub Vocal 1	Wang Jyunhao	50	50	68
4	Seventeen	"Adore U"	1	우하화호호호 (WooHaHwaHoHoHo)	233	Sub Vocal 2	Park Sunho	27	27	81
4	Seventeen	"Adore U"	1	우하화호호호 (WooHaHwaHoHoHo)	233	Sub Vocal 3	Moon Junho	21	21	88
4	Seventeen	"Adore U"	1	우하화호호호 (WooHaHwaHoHoHo)	233	Rapper 1	Song Changha	87	87	53
4	Seventeen	"Adore U"	1	우하화호호호 (WooHaHwaHoHoHo)	233	Rapper 2	Choi Jinhwa	18	18	90
4	Seventeen	"Clap"	2	클래핑 (Clapping)	544	Main Vocal	Lee Hyeop	18	3018	46
4	Seventeen	"Clap"	2	클래핑 (Clapping)	544	Sub Vocal 1	**Kwon Taeeun**	57	3057	28
4	Seventeen	"Clap"	2	클래핑 (Clapping)	544	Sub Vocal 2	Kim Jingon	56	3056	29
4	Seventeen	"Clap"	2	클래핑 (Clapping)	544	Sub Vocal 3	Ham Wonjin	164	3164	10
4	Seventeen	"Clap"	2	클래핑 (Clapping)	544	Rapper 1	Nam Dohyon	78	3078	23
4	Seventeen	"Clap"	2	클래핑 (Clapping)	544	Rapper 2	Kim Dongyoon	171	4710	6
5	Wanna One	"Energetic"	1	We Are The World	582	Main Vocal	Jeong Myunghoon	113	3113	12
5	Wanna One	"Energetic"	1	We Are The World	582	Sub Vocal 1	Woo Jewon	39	3039	36
5	Wanna One	"Energetic"	1	We Are The World	582	Sub Vocal 2	**Anzardi Timothée**	27	3027	43
5	Wanna One	"Energetic"	1	We Are The World	582	Sub Vocal 3	Peak	56	3056	29
5	Wanna One	"Energetic"	1	We Are The World	582	Rapper 1	Lee Junhyuk	173	3173	9
5	Wanna One	"Energetic"	1	We Are The World	582	Rapper 2	Won Hyuk	174	4740	5
5	Wanna One	"Light"	2	Light	219	Main Vocal	Choi Sihyuk	18	18	90
5	Wanna One	"Light"	2	Light	219	Sub Vocal 1	Uehara Jun	14	14	96
5	Wanna One	"Light"	2	Light	219	Sub Vocal 2	Tsai Chia Hao	69	69	56
5	Wanna One	"Light"	2	Light	219	Sub Vocal 3	Lee Jaebin	35	35	76
5	Wanna One	"Light"	2	Light	219	Rapper 1	Park Jinyeol	41	41	73
5	Wanna One	"Light"	2	Light	219	Rapper 2	Kwon Heejun	42	42	72
6	Got7	"Girls Girls Girls"	1	어머나 (Oh My)	463	Main Vocal	Kim Kookheon	80	3080	21
6	Got7	"Girls Girls Girls"	1	어머나 (Oh My)	463	Sub Vocal 1	Kang Hyunsoo	17	3017	47
6	Got7	"Girls Girls Girls"	1	어머나 (Oh My)	463	Sub Vocal 2	Byun Seongtae	38	3038	38
6	Got7	"Girls Girls Girls"	1	어머나 (Oh My)	463	Sub Vocal 3	Kim Hyungmin	15	3015	48
6	Got7	"Girls Girls Girls"	1	어머나 (Oh My)	463	Sub Vocal 4	Choi Byungchan	135	4350	8
6	Got7	"Girls Girls Girls"	1	어머나 (Oh My)	463	Rapper 1	Kim Sunghyun	101	3101	16
6	Got7	"Girls Girls Girls"	1	어머나 (Oh My)	463	Rapper 2	Yuri	70	3070	26
6	Got7	"Lullaby"	2	럴러랄라 (Lulla Lalla)	331	Main Vocal	Song Yuvin	89	89	52
6	Got7	"Lullaby"	2	럴러랄라 (Lulla Lalla)	331	Sub Vocal 1	Lee Hamin	9	9	97
6	Got7	"Lullaby"	2	럴러랄라 (Lulla Lalla)	331	Sub Vocal 2	Choi Suhwan	66	66	57
6	Got7	"Lullaby"	2	럴러랄라 (Lulla Lalla)	331	Sub Vocal 3	**Joo Changwook**	59	59	60
6	Got7	"Lullaby"	2	럴러랄라 (Lulla Lalla)	331	Sub Vocal 4	Yun Junghwan	39	39	74
6	Got7	"Lullaby"	2	럴러랄라 (Lulla Lalla)	331	Rapper 1	Baek Jin	51	51	65
6	Got7	"Lullaby"	2	럴러랄라 (Lulla Lalla)	331	Rapper 2	Hwang Geumryul	19	19	89
7	NU'EST W	"Where You At"	1	Search	588	Main Vocal	Lee Taeseung	128	3128	11
7	NU'EST W	"Where You At"	1	Search	588	Sub vocal 1	Heo Jinho	59	3059	27
7	NU'EST W	"Where You At"	1	Search	588	Sub Vocal 2	**Park Sion**	23	3023	45
7	NU'EST W	"Where You At"	1	Search	588	Sub Vocal 3	Kim Minseo (Woollim)	95	3095	18
7	NU'EST W	"Where You At"	1	Search	588	Rapper 1	Sung Minseo	56	3056	29
7	NU'EST W	"Where You At"	1	Search	588	Rapper 2	Lee Woojin	227	5270	2
7	NU'EST W	"Dejavu"	2	비상탈출 (Emergency Escape)	144	Main Vocal	Kim Minseo (Urban Works)	51	51	65
7	NU'EST W	"Dejavu"	2	비상탈출 (Emergency Escape)	144	Sub Vocal 1	Im Dahun	8	8	99
7	NU'EST W	"Dejavu"	2	비상탈출 (Emergency Escape)	144	Sub Vocal 2	Choi Byunghoon	15	15	94
7	NU'EST W	"Dejavu"	2	비상탈출 (Emergency Escape)	144	Sub Vocal 3	Kim Youngsang	26	26	85
7	NU'EST W	"Dejavu"	2	비상탈출 (Emergency Escape)	144	Rapper 1	Kim Junjae	18	18	90
7	NU'EST W	"Dejavu"	2	비상탈출 (Emergency Escape)	144	Rapper 2	Kim Seunghwan	26	26	85
8	NCT U	"The 7th Sense"	2	식스스톤 (Six Stone)	248	Main Rapper	Kim Dongbin	27	27	81
8	NCT U	"The 7th Sense"	2	식스스톤 (Six Stone)	248	Sub Rapper 1	Lee Jinwoo	36	36	75
8	NCT U	"The 7th Sense"	2	식스스톤 (Six Stone)	248	Sub Rapper 2	Song Hyeongjun	45	45	70
8	NCT U	"The 7th Sense"	2	식스스톤 (Six Stone)	248	Vocal 1	Koo Jungmo	45	45	70
8	NCT U	"The 7th Sense"	2	식스스톤 (Six Stone)	248	Vocal 2	Kim Minkyu	78	78	55
8	NCT U	"The 7th Sense"	2	식스스톤 (Six Stone)	248	Vocal 3	Lee Midam	17	17	93
8	NCT U	"Boss"	1	옐로우핑크 (YELLOWPINK)	566	Main Rapper	Kim Yohan	170	4700	7
8	NCT U	"Boss"	1	옐로우핑크 (YELLOWPINK)	566	Sub Rapper 1	Lee Eunsang	48	3048	35
8	NCT U	"Boss"	1	옐로우핑크 (YELLOWPINK)	566	Sub Rapper 2	Lee Jinhyuk	93	3093	19
8	NCT U	"Boss"	1	옐로우핑크 (YELLOWPINK)	566	Vocal 1	Han Seungwoo	99	3099	17
8	NCT U	"Boss"	1	옐로우핑크 (YELLOWPINK)	566	Vocal 2	**Son Dongpyo**	54	3054	32
8	NCT U	"Boss"	1	옐로우핑크 (YELLOWPINK)	566	Vocal 3	Cha Junho	102	3102	15

== Position Evaluation Performances (Episodes 6-7) ==
Each contestant performs in either the Vocal, Rap, Dance, or "X" position on a particular song. "X" is a new position that requires contestants to perform two of the three aforementioned positions. For Vocal, Rap, and Dance positions, the top contestant for each song receives 100 times their votes, while the top contestant among all songs of each position receives a 100,000 vote bonus. For the "X" position, both bonuses are doubled. For "Me After You" and "Attention" teams, the number of votes received by some members was not posted.

Color key

Winner
Leader
Center
Leader and center

Performance					Name	Ranking		
Position	#	Artist	Song	Team Name	Name	Team	Votes	Votes with bonus
Vocal	1	Hwasa	"Twit"	BE 정상 (Be The Best)	Lee Eunsang	1	490	49,000
Vocal	1	Hwasa	"Twit"	BE 정상 (Be The Best)	Yun Junghwan	2	427	427
Vocal	1	Hwasa	"Twit"	BE 정상 (Be The Best)	Lee Hyeop	3	413	413
Vocal	1	Hwasa	"Twit"	BE 정상 (Be The Best)	Lee Midam	4	317	317
Vocal	1	Hwasa	"Twit"	BE 정상 (Be The Best)	Kang Seokhwa	5	272	272
Vocal	5	Paul Kim	"Me After You"	국프 만나 (Me After Producers)	Kim Yohan	5	362	362
Vocal	5	Paul Kim	"Me After You"	국프 만나 (Me After Producers)	Cha Junho	2	533	533
Vocal	5	Paul Kim	"Me After You"	국프 만나 (Me After Producers)	Kim Hyunbin	4	—N/a	—N/a
Vocal	5	Paul Kim	"Me After You"	국프 만나 (Me After Producers)	Han Seungwoo	1	580	58,000
Vocal	5	Paul Kim	"Me After You"	국프 만나 (Me After Producers)	Wei Ziyue	3	—N/a	—N/a
Vocal	8	Wanna One	"Day By Day"	보여보여보 (I See You, Honey)	Song Yuvin	1	545	54,500
Vocal	8	Wanna One	"Day By Day"	보여보여보 (I See You, Honey)	Choi Suhwan	5	235	235
Vocal	8	Wanna One	"Day By Day"	보여보여보 (I See You, Honey)	Kwon Taeeun	2	384	384
Vocal	8	Wanna One	"Day By Day"	보여보여보 (I See You, Honey)	Moon Junho	3	293	293
Vocal	8	Wanna One	"Day By Day"	보여보여보 (I See You, Honey)	Nam Donghyun	4	262	262
Vocal	11	Bolbbalgan4	"To My Youth"	마스터피스 (Masterpiece)	Kim Minkyu	3	508	508
Vocal	11	Bolbbalgan4	"To My Youth"	마스터피스 (Masterpiece)	Kim Wooseok	1	606	160,600
Vocal	11	Bolbbalgan4	"To My Youth"	마스터피스 (Masterpiece)	Lee Jinwoo	2	571	571
Vocal	11	Bolbbalgan4	"To My Youth"	마스터피스 (Masterpiece)	Lee Sejin	5	371	371
Vocal	11	Bolbbalgan4	"To My Youth"	마스터피스 (Masterpiece)	Choi Byungchan	4	473	473
Rap	3	Zico	"Say Yes Or No"	119	Nam Dohyon	1	499	49,900
Rap	3	Zico	"Say Yes Or No"	119	Cho Seungyoun	2	478	478
Rap	3	Zico	"Say Yes Or No"	119	Kim Sungyeon	3	378	378
Rap	3	Zico	"Say Yes Or No"	119	Jung Jaehun	4	354	354
Rap	7	Haon, Vinxen	"Barcode"	PICK 그리고 다음 (Pick and Next)	Yuri	4	340	340
Rap	7	Haon, Vinxen	"Barcode"	PICK 그리고 다음 (Pick and Next)	Baek Jin	2	410	410
Rap	7	Haon, Vinxen	"Barcode"	PICK 그리고 다음 (Pick and Next)	Lee Woojin	3	367	367
Rap	7	Haon, Vinxen	"Barcode"	PICK 그리고 다음 (Pick and Next)	Won Hyuk	1	514	151,400
Dance	4	Bruno Mars	"Finesse (Remix)"	뽐뽐 (Bbom Bbom)	Song Hyeongjun	2	539	539
Dance	4	Bruno Mars	"Finesse (Remix)"	뽐뽐 (Bbom Bbom)	Ham Wonjin	4	452	452
Dance	4	Bruno Mars	"Finesse (Remix)"	뽐뽐 (Bbom Bbom)	Kim Sihun	5	374	374
Dance	4	Bruno Mars	"Finesse (Remix)"	뽐뽐 (Bbom Bbom)	Lee Hangyul	1	563	56,300
Dance	4	Bruno Mars	"Finesse (Remix)"	뽐뽐 (Bbom Bbom)	Kang Minhee	3	458	458
Dance	4	Bruno Mars	"Finesse (Remix)"	뽐뽐 (Bbom Bbom)	Kim Dongyoon	6	301	301
Dance	4	Bruno Mars	"Finesse (Remix)"	뽐뽐 (Bbom Bbom)	Joo Changwook	7	275	275
Dance	6	Jason Derulo	"Swalla (Remix)"	촬라 (Intoxicated)	Choi Junseong	3	478	478
Dance	6	Jason Derulo	"Swalla (Remix)"	촬라 (Intoxicated)	Kang Hyeonsu	1	616	161,600
Dance	6	Jason Derulo	"Swalla (Remix)"	촬라 (Intoxicated)	Park Yoonsol	2	601	601
Dance	6	Jason Derulo	"Swalla (Remix)"	촬라 (Intoxicated)	Kim Minseo	5	386	386
Dance	6	Jason Derulo	"Swalla (Remix)"	촬라 (Intoxicated)	Lee Taeseung	4	451	451
Dance	6	Jason Derulo	"Swalla (Remix)"	촬라 (Intoxicated)	Wang Jyunhao	6	280	280
Dance	10	Imagine Dragons	"Believer"	늑대소년 (Wolf Boy)	Son Dongpyo	3	497	497
Dance	10	Imagine Dragons	"Believer"	늑대소년 (Wolf Boy)	Park Sunho	6	175	175
Dance	10	Imagine Dragons	"Believer"	늑대소년 (Wolf Boy)	Hwang Yunseong	1	612	61,200
Dance	10	Imagine Dragons	"Believer"	늑대소년 (Wolf Boy)	Kim Kookheon	4	485	485
Dance	10	Imagine Dragons	"Believer"	늑대소년 (Wolf Boy)	Keum Donghyun	2	566	566
Dance	10	Imagine Dragons	"Believer"	늑대소년 (Wolf Boy)	Kim Dongbin	5	280	280
X (Vocal X Dance)	2	Charlie Puth	"Attention"	양념 반 후라이드 반 (Half Seasoned Half Fried)	Koo Jungmo	1	476	95,200
X (Vocal X Dance)	2	Charlie Puth	"Attention"	양념 반 후라이드 반 (Half Seasoned Half Fried)	Han Gichan	2	349	349
X (Vocal X Dance)	2	Charlie Puth	"Attention"	양념 반 후라이드 반 (Half Seasoned Half Fried)	Tony	5	302	302
X (Vocal X Dance)	2	Charlie Puth	"Attention"	양념 반 후라이드 반 (Half Seasoned Half Fried)	Hong Seongjun	6	156	—N/a
X (Vocal X Dance)	2	Charlie Puth	"Attention"	양념 반 후라이드 반 (Half Seasoned Half Fried)	Moon Hyunbin	4	319	319
X (Vocal X Dance)	2	Charlie Puth	"Attention"	양념 반 후라이드 반 (Half Seasoned Half Fried)	Kim Sunghyun	3	330	330
X (Vocal X Dance)	2	Charlie Puth	"Attention"	양념 반 후라이드 반 (Half Seasoned Half Fried)	Mahiro Hidaka	7	128	—N/a
X (Rap X Dance)	9	SMTM4	"Turtle Ship"	터틀 브라더스 (Turtle Brothers)	Lee Jinhyuk	1	680	336,000
X (Rap X Dance)	9	SMTM4	"Turtle Ship"	터틀 브라더스 (Turtle Brothers)	Lee Eugene	6	138	138
X (Rap X Dance)	9	SMTM4	"Turtle Ship"	터틀 브라더스 (Turtle Brothers)	Lee Wonjun	2	335	335
X (Rap X Dance)	9	SMTM4	"Turtle Ship"	터틀 브라더스 (Turtle Brothers)	Kwon Heejun	4	206	206
X (Rap X Dance)	9	SMTM4	"Turtle Ship"	터틀 브라더스 (Turtle Brothers)	Woo Jewon	3	236	236
X (Rap X Dance)	9	SMTM4	"Turtle Ship"	터틀 브라더스 (Turtle Brothers)	Peak	5	194	194

== Concept Evaluation Performances (Episode 10) ==
The contestants were assigned into different concept songs through a voting system which took place between the first and second elimination rounds. When the second elimination round concluded, some contestants were reshuffled into different concept songs if their teams had more than six contestants. The contestant with the most votes in each team receives 500 times their votes. The winning team also receives an additional 200,000 vote bonus that is split based on each contestant's ranking: the contestant with the most votes receives 100,000 votes, while the remaining contestants receive 20,000 votes.

Color key

Winner
Leader
Center
Leader and center

Performance					Contestant				
Concept	#	Producer	Song	Votes	Position	Name	Votes	Rank	Bonus
Future Funk	1	Kwon Deok-geun	"Super Special Girl"	92	Main Vocal	Song Yuvin	20	24	
Future Funk	1	Kwon Deok-geun	"Super Special Girl"	92	Sub Vocal 1	Choi Suhwan	9	28	
Future Funk	1	Kwon Deok-geun	"Super Special Girl"	92	Sub Vocal 2	Kang Hyeonsu	4	30	
Future Funk	1	Kwon Deok-geun	"Super Special Girl"	92	Sub Vocal 3	Park Sunho	4	30	
Future Funk	1	Kwon Deok-geun	"Super Special Girl"	92	Rapper 1	Keum Donghyun	31	20	*500
Future Funk	1	Kwon Deok-geun	"Super Special Girl"	92	Rapper 2	Kim Sihun	24	22	
Funky Retro Dance	2	KZ, Nthonious & The-Private	"Pretty Girl" (이뻐이뻐)	395	Main Vocal	Kang Minhee	51	15	
Funky Retro Dance	2	KZ, Nthonious & The-Private	"Pretty Girl" (이뻐이뻐)	395	Sub Vocal 1	Koo Jungmo	93	9	
Funky Retro Dance	2	KZ, Nthonious & The-Private	"Pretty Girl" (이뻐이뻐)	395	Sub Vocal 2	Ham Wonjin	48	16	
Funky Retro Dance	2	KZ, Nthonious & The-Private	"Pretty Girl" (이뻐이뻐)	395	Sub Vocal 3	Son Dongpyo	48	16	
Funky Retro Dance	2	KZ, Nthonious & The-Private	"Pretty Girl" (이뻐이뻐)	395	Rapper 1	Song Hyeongjun	101	6	*500
Funky Retro Dance	2	KZ, Nthonious & The-Private	"Pretty Girl" (이뻐이뻐)	395	Rapper 2	Lee Jinwoo	54	13	
R&B, Dance House	3	Primeboi	"Monday to Sunday"^{21}	283	Main Vocal	Lee Hyeop	11	27	
R&B, Dance House	3	Primeboi	"Monday to Sunday"^{21}	283	Sub Vocal 1	Kim Minkyu	68	12	
R&B, Dance House	3	Primeboi	"Monday to Sunday"^{21}	283	Sub Vocal 2	Lee Sejin	19	25	
R&B, Dance House	3	Primeboi	"Monday to Sunday"^{21}	283	Sub Vocal 3	Tony	53	14	
R&B, Dance House	3	Primeboi	"Monday to Sunday"^{21}	283	Sub Vocal 4	Kim Dongyoon	13	26	
R&B, Dance House	3	Primeboi	"Monday to Sunday"^{21}	283	Rapper 1	Nam Dohyon	110	5	*500
R&B, Dance House	3	Primeboi	"Monday to Sunday"^{21}	283	Rapper 2	Joo Changwook	9	28	
Future EDM Dance	4	Noheul & Kiggen	"U Got It"	512	Main Vocal	Han Seungwoo	91	10	+20,000
Future EDM Dance	4	Noheul & Kiggen	"U Got It"	512	Sub Vocal 1	Kim Wooseok	115	4	+20,000
Future EDM Dance	4	Noheul & Kiggen	"U Got It"	512	Sub Vocal 2	Hwang Yunseong	36	18	+20,000
Future EDM Dance	4	Noheul & Kiggen	"U Got It"	512	Sub Vocal 3	Cha Junho	31	20	+20,000
Future EDM Dance	4	Noheul & Kiggen	"U Got It"	512	Rapper 1	Kim Yohan	144	2	*500, +100,000
Future EDM Dance	4	Noheul & Kiggen	"U Got It"	512	Rapper 2	Lee Eunsang	95	8	+20,000
Mainstream Pop	5	Zico	"Move" (움직여)	495	Main Rapper	Kim Hyunbin	24	22	
Mainstream Pop	5	Zico	"Move" (움직여)	495	Sub Rapper 1	Cho Seungyoun	145	1	*500
Mainstream Pop	5	Zico	"Move" (움직여)	495	Sub Rapper 2	Lee Jinhyuk	123	3	
Mainstream Pop	5	Zico	"Move" (움직여)	495	Vocal 1	Kim Kookheon	36	18	
Mainstream Pop	5	Zico	"Move" (움직여)	495	Vocal 2	Lee Hangyul	69	11	
Mainstream Pop	5	Zico	"Move" (움직여)	495	Vocal 3	Choi Byungchan	98	7	

== Debut Evaluation Performances (Episode 12) ==
Color key

- Leader
- Center

Performance			Contestant	
#	Producer	Song	Position	Name
1	Sean Alexander, Drew Ryan Scott, Phil Schwan	"To My World"	Main vocal	Cho Seungyoun
1	Sean Alexander, Drew Ryan Scott, Phil Schwan	"To My World"	Sub vocal 1	Han Seungwoo
1	Sean Alexander, Drew Ryan Scott, Phil Schwan	"To My World"	Sub vocal 2	Lee Eunsang
1	Sean Alexander, Drew Ryan Scott, Phil Schwan	"To My World"	Sub vocal 3	Kim Minkyu
1	Sean Alexander, Drew Ryan Scott, Phil Schwan	"To My World"	Sub vocal 4	Lee Sejin
1	Sean Alexander, Drew Ryan Scott, Phil Schwan	"To My World"	Sub vocal 5	Hwang Yunseong
1	Sean Alexander, Drew Ryan Scott, Phil Schwan	"To My World"	Sub vocal 6	Cha Junho
1	Sean Alexander, Drew Ryan Scott, Phil Schwan	"To My World"	Rapper 1	Kim Yohan
1	Sean Alexander, Drew Ryan Scott, Phil Schwan	"To My World"	Rapper 2	Song Hyeongjun
1	Sean Alexander, Drew Ryan Scott, Phil Schwan	"To My World"	Rapper 3	Keum Donghyun
2	Hui (Pentagon), Flow Blow	"Boyness (소년미/少年美)"	Main vocal	Song Yuvin
2	Hui (Pentagon), Flow Blow	"Boyness (소년미/少年美)"	Sub vocal 1	Kim Wooseok
2	Hui (Pentagon), Flow Blow	"Boyness (소년미/少年美)"	Sub vocal 2	Ham Wonjin
2	Hui (Pentagon), Flow Blow	"Boyness (소년미/少年美)"	Sub vocal 3	Kang Minhee
2	Hui (Pentagon), Flow Blow	"Boyness (소년미/少年美)"	Sub vocal 4	Tony
2	Hui (Pentagon), Flow Blow	"Boyness (소년미/少年美)"	Sub vocal 5	Koo Jungmo
2	Hui (Pentagon), Flow Blow	"Boyness (소년미/少年美)"	Sub vocal 6	Lee Hangyul
2	Hui (Pentagon), Flow Blow	"Boyness (소년미/少年美)"	Rapper 1	Lee Jinhyuk
2	Hui (Pentagon), Flow Blow	"Boyness (소년미/少年美)"	Rapper 2	Nam Dohyon
2	Hui (Pentagon), Flow Blow	"Boyness (소년미/少年美)"	Rapper 3	Son Dongpyo

== Notes ==
- ^{1}Lee Eugene is in the cast of JTBC drama Sky Castle.
- ^{2}Kang Seokhwa, Kim Sungyeon, Lee Midam, Mahiro Hidaka, and Wang Jyunhao took part in YG Entertainment's survival show YG Treasure Box.
  Lee Midam also appeared on another Mnet's program Stray Kids as part of YG Trainee.
- ^{3}Peak is a Thai singer and actor, he was also a participant on the first episode of the sixth season of music show I Can See Your Voice.
- ^{4}Wei Ziyue was a contestant on Chinese survival show All For One.
- ^{5}Kim Yeongsang is a member of the group IM66 and was a contestant on SBS Super Model Contest in 2014.
- ^{6}Nam Dohyon and Kim Junjae were contestants on Under Nineteen.
- ^{7}Lee Hangyul is a member of the group IM66, its subgroup IM and was a contestant on The Unit.
- ^{8}Kim Dongbin was a contestant on the second season of Produce 101.
- ^{9}Kim Kookheon and Song Yuvin were members of MYTEEN.
  Song Yuvin was also a contestant on Superstar K6 and King of Mask Singer.
- ^{10}Choi Byungchan and Han Seungwoo are members of Victon.
- ^{11}Park Sunho is a Korean actor, he is also in the cast of Best Chicken alongside Produce 101 season 1 contestant Kim Sohye.
- ^{12}Nam Donghyun is the younger brother of Nam Taehyun. They are members of South Club.
- ^{13}Kim Sunghyun is a member of IN2IT and was a contestant on Boys24.
- ^{14}Kim Wooseok (formerly known as Wooshin) and Lee Jinhyuk (formerly known as Wei) are members of UP10TION.
  Wooseok was also a host on The Show alongside Produce 101 season 1 contestant Jeon Somi.
- ^{15}Baek Jin, Kim Kookheon and Kim Sungyeon were contestants on MIXNINE.
- ^{16}Cho Seungyoun is a member of UNIQ. He is also a soloist and producer under the name "WOODZ". As a soloist, he previously went by the name "Luizy".
- ^{17}Im Siu left the show before the re-evaluations due to personal reasons.
- ^{18}JYP Entertainment's Yoon Seobin was immediately removed from the show after the first episode aired when an image of him smoking surfaced online. Later, he was accused of underage drinking and bullying.
- ^{19}Park Yoonsol was a contestant on Boys24.
- ^{20}Kang Hyeonsu was a member of LC9 and BLK.
- ^{21}Number of Votes for the eliminated trainees were not shown on-air on Episode 5.
- ^{22}Kim Dongyoon was originally eliminated in Episode 8 and later came back as the X member for the Concept Evaluation in Episode 9.
- ^{23}Choi Byungchan left the show after the concept evaluations due to health reasons.
- ^{24}Number of Votes for the eliminated trainees were not shown on-air on Episode 11 except for Lee Jinwoo and Kim Dongyoon who ranked 22nd and 23rd respectively.
