= 31 Boys 5 Concepts =

Extended play

EP by Produce X 101 contestants
- Released: July 5, 2019
- Length: 16:33
- Language: Korean
- Label: CJ E&M

31 Boys 5 Concepts is an EP by contestants of the South Korean survival show Produce X 101. It was released online for download on July 5, 2019, by CJ E&M.

== Background ==
Produce X 101 is a South Korean survival show that aired on Mnet where 101 male trainees from various entertainment companies competed to debut in an 11-member boy group.

On the 8th, 9th and 10th episode, the 31 remaining trainees were split into five teams and given five new songs from different producers, with different genres.

== Commercial performance ==
Three out of five songs on the album charted in the top 100 of the Circle Digital Chart. "U Got It" peaked at #49, "Pretty Girl" (이뻐 이뻐) at #70, and "Move" (움직여) at #74.

== Track listing ==
No.	Title	Lyrics	Music	Arrangement	Length
1.	"U Got It" (Got U (갓츄))	Kiggen	Noheul, Sean Alexander, Drew Ryan Scott, Eginius	Noheul	3:08
2.	"Monday to Sunday" (Daily Vitamin (데일리 비타민))	Primeboi	Primeboi, 12!3	Primeboi	3:36
3.	"Pretty Girl (이뻐 이뻐)" (Crayon Pastel (크레파스))	KZ, D`DAY	KZ, Nthonius, The-Private	Nthonius, The-Private	3:33
4.	"Super Special Girl" (MamMam (맴맴))	Kwon Deok-geun, Young Chance, gxxdkelvin	Kwon Deok-geun, Young Chance	Kwon Deok-geun	3:11
5.	"Move (움직여)" (SIXC (6 crazy))	Zico	Zico, Poptime	Zico, Poptime	3:06
Total length:					16:33
