= Jang Se-hyuk =

South Korean actor (born 2000)

- Born: Jang Deok-su; March 2, 2000 (age 26); South Korea
- Education: Seoul Institute of the Arts
- Occupation: Actor
- Years active: 2023–present
- Agent: Secret ENT

Korean name
- Hangul: 장덕수
- RR: Jang Deoksu
- MR: Chang Tŏksu

Stage name
- Hangul: 장세혁
- RR: Jang Sehyeok
- MR: Chang Sehyŏk

Jang Deok-su (Korean: 장덕수; born March 2, 2000), known professionally as Jang Se-hyuk (장세혁), is a South Korean actor under Secret ENT.

== Career ==
In 2024, Jang signed an exclusive contract with Secret ENT.

== Filmography ==
=== Film ===
Year	Title	Role	Ref.
2025	I Started Living with Five Men	Kang Min-hyuk	

=== Television series ===
Key
†	Denotes television productions that have not yet been released

Year	Title	Role	Notes	Ref.
2023–2025	Bitch x Rich	Park Woo-jin	Season 1–2; debut work	
2025	Our Unwritten Seoul	teen Choi Seung-hyeon		
2025	Love, Take Two	teen Ryu Jeong-seok		
2025–2026	Pro Bono	Kang Min-ha		
2026	Filing for Love	PK		
2026	Dive into You	Yoon Ha-ru		

=== Television shows ===
Year	Title	Role	Ref.
2025	Casting 1147km	Contestant	

=== Music video appearances ===
Year	Title	Artist	Ref.
2020	"Love Is"	Jeon Sang-keun	
