= Produce X 101 =

Boy group survival reality show

- Promotional poster
- Genre: Reality/Survival Show
- Directed by: Ahn Jun-young
- Presented by: Lee Dong-wook
- Opening theme: "X1-MA" by Produce X 101 contestants
- Country of origin: South Korea
- Original language: Korean
- No. of episodes: 12

Production
- Executive producer: Kim Yong-bum
- Running time: 140–160 minutes 265 minutes (Finale)
- Production company: CJ E&M

Original release
- Network: Mnet
- Release: May 3 – July 19, 2019

Produce X 101 (Korean: 프로듀스 X 101) is a 2019 South Korean boy group survival reality show on Mnet and the fourth and final season of the Produce 101 franchise. The public, referred to as "national producers", "produces" a boy band by choosing 11 members among the 101 trainees from 47 different entertainment companies and independent trainees through online voting and live voting with multiple elimination rounds. The public will also choose the group's concept, debut song, and group name. The show aired from May 3 to July 19, 2019. Contestant Kim Yohan from Oui Entertainment obtained the most votes at the end, becoming the debut group center. The group from this show was named X1, but after extensive voting manipulation was proven, the group was disbanded on January 6, 2020.

== Promotions and broadcast ==
On February 28, 2019, Mnet announced that the debuting group under the show will promote for five years, with a 2 1/2-year exclusive contract and another two-and-a-half-year non-exclusive contract, meaning that the eventual members can return to co-promote with their original agencies after the first half.

Filming for the show began on March 4, 2019. On the same day, the trainers were announced, as well as Lee Dong-wook announced as MC role. The trainees were first revealed through a runway show on March 20, 2019. On March 21, their first performance of their title track, "X1-MA" (_지마) was revealed on M Countdown later that day, revealing Son Dong-pyo of DSP Media as the center.

The show premiered on May 3, 2019, on Mnet in South Korea, Mnet Japan and AbemaTV in Japan, JOOX in Thailand, Hong Kong, Malaysia, Myanmar and Indonesia, YouTube and Vlive in Other international location. The series will be broadcast on tvN Asia in Hong Kong, Singapore, Taiwan, Malaysia, Indonesia, the Philippines, Thailand, Myanmar and Sri Lanka, 18 hours after the original South Korean broadcast from May 4, 2019, with English, Chinese, Malay, Thai and Indonesian subtitles.

New to this series is the X rank, the lowest rank where the contestants are at their most vulnerable to be eliminated. It is similar to the F rank used in the previous three seasons. Furthermore, the 11th member of the final group will be decided by the total number of votes they have accumulated throughout the whole season, meaning that the trainee who places 11th in the finale does not necessarily become the 11th member of the final group.

== Staff members ==
The series was presented by Lee Dong-wook. Other artists featured as cast members:

- Vocal trainers:
  - Lee Seok-hoon
  - Shin Yu-mi
- Dance trainers:
  - Bae Yoon-jeong
  - Kwon Jae-seung
  - Choi Young-jun
- Rap trainer:
  - Cheetah
- Guest trainers:
  - One-day Vocal Trainer: Soyou (Episodes 1–2)
  - Group X Battle Rap Trainer: Lee Joo-heon (Episodes 3–4)

== Contestants ==
Color key (In order of contestant's rank on the show)

Final member of X1
Contestants eliminated in the finale
Contestants eliminated in the third elimination round
Contestants eliminated in the second elimination round
Contestants eliminated in the first elimination round
Contestants that left the show

101 Contestants
Kim Yo-han (김요한)	Kim Woo-seok (김우석)	Han Seung-woo (한승우)	Song Hyeong-jun (송형준)	Cho Seung-youn (조승연)
Son Dong-pyo (손동표)	Lee Han-gyul (이한결)	Nam Do-hyon (남도현)	Cha Jun-ho (차준호)	Kang Min-hee (강민희)
Lee Eun-sang (이은상)	Kim Min-kyu (김민규)	Koo Jung-mo (구정모)	Lee Jin-hyuk (이진혁)	Song Yu-vin (송유빈)
Ham Won-jin (함원진)	Keum Dong-hyun (금동현)	Hwang Yun-seong (황윤성)	Lee Se-jin (이세진)	Tony (토니)
Kim Kook-heon (김국헌)	Lee Jin-woo (이진우)	Kim Dong-yun (김동윤)	Lee Hyeop (이협)	Park Sun-ho (박선호)
Kang Hyeon-su (강현수)	Kim Si-hun (김시훈)	Choi Su-hwan (최수환)	Joo Chang-wook (주창욱)	Kim Hyeon-bin (김현빈)
Choi Byung-chan (최병찬)	Moon Hyun-bin (문현빈)	Won Hyuk (원혁)	Kwon Tae-eun (권태은)	Kang Seok-hwa (강석화)
Baek Jin (백진)	Lee Mi-dam (이미담)	Yun Jung-hwan (윤정환)	Jeong Jae-hoon (정재훈)	Park Yu-ri (박유리)
Lee Woo-jin (이우진)	Kim Dong-bin (김동빈)	Wei Ziyue (위자월)	Kim Sung-hyun (김성현)	Kim Sung-yeon (김성연)
Choi Jun-seong (최준성)	Lee Won-jun (이원준)	Park Yun-sol (박윤솔)	Mahiro Hidaka (히다카 마히로)	Peak Kongthap (픽)
Hong Seong-jun (홍성준)	Kim Min-seo (김민서)	Lee Tae-seung (이태승)	Woo Je-won (우제원)	Lee Eugene (이유진)
Kwon Hui-jun (권희준)	Han Gi-chan (한기찬)	Wang Jyunhao (왕군호)	Moon Jun-ho (문준호)	Nam Dong-hyun (남동현)
Anzardi Timothee (안자르디 티모시)	Kim Jin-gon (김진곤)	Lee Ha-min (이하민)	Jeon Hyun-woo (전현우)	Kim Yeong-sang (김영상)
Byeon Seong-tae (변성태)	Lee Hwan (이환)	Jung Young-bin (정영빈)	Oh Sae-bom (오새봄)	Yoo Geun-min (유건민)
Jung Myung-hoon (정명훈)	Steven Kim (스티븐 킴)	Song Chang-ha (송창하)	Choi Jin-hwa (최진화)	Lee Jun-hyuk (이준혁)
Lee Gyu-hyung (이규형)	Won Hyun-sik (원현식)	Tsai Chiahao (채가호)	Choi Si-hyuk (최시혁)	Kim Gwan-woo (김관우)
Park Jin-yeol (박진열)	Kim Min-seo (김민서)	Heo Jin-ho (허진호)	Hwang Geum-ryul (황금률)	Hong Sung-hyeon (홍성현)
Yu Seong-jun (유성준)	Sung Min-seo (성민서)	Lee Sang-ho (이상호)	Kim Seung-hwan (김승환)	Kim Hyeong-min (김형민)
Jun Uehara (우에하라 준)	Yoon Min-guk (윤민국)	Park Si-on (박시온)	Kim Jun-jae (김준재)	Lee Jae-bin (이재빈)
Yun Hyun-jo (윤현조)	Lim Da-hun (임다훈)	Choi Byung-hoon (최병훈)	Kim Dong-kyu (김동규)	Yoon Seo-bin (윤서빈)
Im Si-woo (임시우)				

== Episodes ==
=== Episode 1 (May 3, 2019) ===
Each contestant enters the studio chooses his preferred seat among chairs numbered 1 to 101, before being informed about several changes that will be applied in this season. Contestants then perform according to their company for evaluation. The mentors grade and assign them into temporary groups for training: A, B, C, D, and X, with A being the highest and X the lowest. At the ending, the popularity ranking is shown with Jellyfish Entertainment's Kim Min-kyu taking 1st place

=== Episode 2 (May 10, 2019) ===
The trainees react to the first episode along with Lee Dong-wook. The evaluation from Episode 1 continues until all the trainees are evaluated. The trainees in groups A, B, C, and D are taken to the dormitories and are given roommates and uniforms. They are told that they will be training and performing the theme song, "X1-MA", on M! Countdown. Instead of being sent home, the X trainees were secretly taken to a different training center to receive specialized training. Each contestant records video evaluations for the song. The episode ends with the popularity ranking showing Oui Entertainment's Kim Yo-han in 1st place.

=== Episode 3 (May 17, 2019) ===
The trainees film themselves individually performing "X1-MA". Each video is watched by the mentors, who then reevaluate the trainees. Afterwards, the trainees are given their new grade and move into their new rooms corresponding to their rank. Following the reorganization, they are told that the center position of the "X1-MA" performance will be instead chosen by audience vote instead of trainee vote. DSP Media's Son Dong-pyo, Brand New Music's Kim Si-hun, and TOP Media's Kim Woo-seok are shown to be the Top 3, with Son Dong-pyo winning. Trainees who are reevaluated as X will not be able to appear in the performances.

The trainees begin the Group X Battle, where they compete with a group's debut song and their hit song. The teams are: EXO's "MAMA" v. "Love Shot", BTS's "No More Dream" v. "Blood Sweat and Tears", Monsta X's "Trespass" v. "Dramarama", Seventeen's "Adore U" v. "Clap", NU'EST W's "Dejavu" v. "Where U At", Wanna One's "Energetic" v. "Light", NCT U's "The 7th Sense" v. "Boss", and Got7's "Girls, Girls Girls" v. "Lullaby". All songs are performed live and each member is voted on by the audience individually. The group with the highest score among the two wins and gains a benefit of 3000 bonus votes for each of its members, with the highest-ranked member, will gain an extra benefit of having his score multiplied by 10 in addition of the 3000 bonus votes. The group with the highest votes will later perform on M! Countdown. Rehearsals and performances of "MAMA", "Love Shot", and "No More Dream" are shown. The episode ends with the current rankings, with Oui Entertainment's Kim Yo-han maintaining his 1st-place position.

=== Episode 4 (May 24, 2019) ===
The rehearsals and performances of the remaining teams are shown. Monsta X's Jooheon appears as a special trainer. After the last performance, trainees are shown their rankings based on the audience and bonus votes. Source Music's Kim Hyunbin places 1st in individual votes. His team, BTS's "No More Dream" (composed of Kim Hyunbin, Kim Sungyeon, Hong Sunghyun, Steven Kim, Won Hyunsik, and Lee Sangho) also earned the most points in the group battle competition, earning the opportunity to perform a special M! Countdown stage.

=== Episode 5 (May 31, 2019) ===
The first elimination round begins with the remaining 99 contestants entering the main studio by company. In between announcements of each trainee's ranking, events leading up to the elimination are shown, such as their dorm life and a hidden camera prank. A poll for 'Top Visual' was also conducted, in which Jellyfish Entertainment's Kim Mingyu was ranked 1st. During the ceremony, trainees from rank 1 to 60 will move on to the next round while trainees from rank 61 to 99 will be eliminated from the competition. Oui Entertainment's Kim Yohan takes 1st place in the first elimination round. Jung Jae-hun finishes 60th place, narrowly escaping elimination. The episode ends with the contestants comforting the eliminated trainees.

=== Episode 6 (June 7, 2019) ===
Lee Dong-wook meets with the trainees once again to announce the next challenge. The trainees are tasked to perform live in groups based on positions they want to debut in: vocal, dance, rap, or "X". "X" is a new position that requires trainees to perform two of the three aforementioned positions simultaneously. There are four songs for vocals (Paul Kim's "Me After You", Hwasa's "Twit", Bolbbalgan4's "To My Youth", and Wanna One's "Day by Day"), three songs for dance (Imagine Dragons's "Believer", Bruno Mars's "Finesse", and Jason Derulo's "Swalla"), two songs for rap (Zico's "Tell Me Yes or No" and Haon, Vinxen's "Barcode"), and two songs for "X" (Charlie Puth's "Attention", for vocal x dance, and SMTM4's "Turtle Ship", for rap x dance). Each song has a member limit and would be picked by each trainee based on their ranks: Kim Yohan who ranked 1st from the first elimination round would have the privilege of choosing the song he wants to perform first. The winner from each performance in the vocal, dance, and rap positions will receive 100 times their votes while the winner among all songs of each category will receive 100,000 votes. For the "X" position, the winner from each performance will receive 200 times their votes while the overall winner will receive 200,000 votes. After each performance, they are ranked in their groups first and then overall in the category. Lee Dong-wook also announces that only the top 30 trainees will remain in the next round. Only five groups are covered this week.

=== Episode 7 (June 14, 2019) ===
The remaining teams perform their respective stages and rehearsals for the groups are shown. After the last performance, the contestants are shown their overall ranking based on their positions. Kim Woo-seok, Kang Hyeon-su, and Won Hyuk emerged as the overall winners of the vocal, dance, and rap positions, respectively, each of them earning 100,000 votes along with their audience votes times 100. Lee Jin-hyuk emerged as the overall winner of the "X" position, earning 200,000 votes along with his audience votes times 200.

=== Episode 8 (June 21, 2019) ===
Lee Dongwook announces the beginning of the next evaluation prior to the second round of eliminations, meaning that all 60 boys that have survived so far will continue to practice for the performances, but not all of them may get to perform. The evaluation is revealed to be a concept evaluation where viewers chose group formations from a poll online. Lee Dongwook introduces the six songs: Funky Retro Dance "Pretty Girl" (KZ, Nthonious & The-Private), Future Funk "Super Special Girl" (Kwon Deun Guk), Mainstream Pop "MOVE" (Zico), R&B, Dance House "Monday To Sunday" (PrimeBoi) and Future EDM Dance "U Got It" (Noheul & Kiggen). The second round of eliminations takes place during the second half of the episode with the remaining 60 contestants from each company are seen entering the main studio. Names of the top 30 trainees are called by Lee Dongwook one by one starting from rank 29. The contenders for 1st place were Kim Yo-Han, Song Hyeong-jun, Lee Jin-hyuk & Kim Woo-Seok. It is then announced that Kim Woo-Seok ranked at 1st place. Meanwhile, the contenders for 30th place were Joo Chang-Uk, Kim Dong-Yoon, Moon Hyun-bin & Won Hyuk. It is announced that Joo Chang-Uk ranked on the 30th. Lee Dongwook says that the trainees can have a second chance by recording a video of their dance of "X1-MA" and a 1-minute introduction video appealing to the National Producers to give them another chance. The National Producers can vote for 1 eliminated trainee, and voting ends within 24 hours after the end of this episode.

=== Episode 9 (June 28, 2019) ===
After the Second Elimination, the 30 trainees move to Concept Evaluation Performance, and then Representative MC Lee Dong-wook announces that only 6 trainees are needed in each group and the trainees have to vote on who is staying.

After heading to the new groups, the teams head to the recording studio to meet with their Producers to record their song. After that, Lee Dong-wook then reveals the X trainee (in which one trainee can go back after recording a video for the National Producers to vote) before revealing, Lee Dong-wook calls four candidates for the X trainee, He calls: Kwon Taeun (A.CONIC), Moon Hyunbin (Starship Entertainment), Kim Dong-yun (Woolim Entertainment) and Baek Jin (VINE Entertainment). It is then revealed that Kim Dong-yun was chosen as the X trainee. Then Lee Dong-wook gives each team 30 minutes whether they want to recruit Dong-yun. If no one recruits Dong-yun, he will have to choose a team randomly. In the end, Team Monday to Sunday recruits Dong-yun to their team. They now practice in order to prepare for the stage.

=== Episode 10 (July 5, 2019) ===
Each concept stage was shown along with behind the scenes practices, training, and recording for each group. After each group performed, Lee Dong-wook gathered the trainees and announced the rankings for each group and for each trainee among the groups. "U Got It" was announced to be the first place team, with trainee Kim Yo-han taking the overall first rank spot, gaining the most benefit votes.

=== Episode 11 (July 12, 2019) ===
Lee Dong-wook then announces the start of the 3rd elimination. He mentions Plan A's Choi Byung-chan, who was absent during filming, has left the show and will not be advancing to the finals. He also reveals that only 20 trainees will survive. The episode continues with the makeup tips segment headed by the YouTuber Ssinnim, and the trainees' Sports Games segment, with "Pretty Girl" team winning overall. Afterwards, the elimination announcement starts, starting from 19th place going up. The four candidates for 1st place are revealed, who are Han Seung-woo, Lee Jin-hyuk, Kim Woo-seok, and Kim Yo-han. The segment for trainees choosing their fixed pick starts, and Hwang Yun-seong takes first place for the most votes and wins a brand new Samsung phone. The announcement continues, and the ones battling for 1st place are Kim Woo-seok and Kim Yo-han, with 1st place ultimately going to Kim Yo-han.

The candidates for 20th place are revealed, Kim Kook-heon, Lee Se-jin, Lee Jin-woo, and Kim Dong-yun. In 23rd and 22nd place is Kim Dong-yun and Lee Jin-woo, respectively. The two remaining trainees are called up to the stage and give their last speeches. The 20th place ends up going to Lee Se-jin.

Afterwards, the remaining 20 trainees choose their debut evaluation song, "To My World" (Drew Ryan Scott, Sean Alexander, Phil Schwan) or "Boyness" (Hui from Pentagon, Flow Blow) and choose their positions during as well. Higher ranked trainees have the advantage of kicking off other trainees in the position they want and move them to a lower position. The episode ends with the trainee's individual cards being flashed on screen and the official time of the final, which was changed to 8 pm KST from 11 pm to accommodate the younger trainees.

=== Episode 12 (July 19, 2019) ===
The episode started off with the final trainees doing a final journal in a practice room. They talked about their adventure and progress on the show. Once voting was opened, the trainees perform the show's title song "X1_MA". Lee Dongwook then revealed the name of the group, as was voted on by the public, "X1". "X1" is meant to represent the show's title song "X1_MA", the 11 trainees in roman numerals, and the 10+X theme of the show. They then showed some behind the scenes recording and practices for "Boyness" and "To My World", even teasing who the group centers would be. During the live performance following these clips, it was revealed that Song Yuvin was chosen as the center for "Boyness" and Hwang Yunseong was chosen as the center for "To My World". After the performances of each debut song all 20 trainees then performed the song "Dream For You" with some behind the scenes clips played beforehand. The ranking announcement started from the contestant who ranked at 10th place which was Starship's Kang Min-hee followed by Woolim's Cha Jun-ho at 9th, MBK's Nam Do-hyon at 8th, MBK's Lee Han-gyul at 7th, DSP's Son Dong-pyo at 6th, Yuehua's Cho Seung-youn at 5th, Starship's Song Hyung-jun at 4th, and Plan A's Han Seung-woo at 3rd, confirming them for debut. Then, TOP's Kim Woo-seok and OUI's Kim Yo-han are called up as contenders for 1st, with Kim Yo-han taking the first place, confirming his position as X1's center. The contenders for the X place were Jellyfish's Kim Min-gyu, Starship's Koo Jung-mo, Brand New Music's Lee Eun-sang and TOP's Lee Jin-hyuk. It was then announced that the X and final spot for X1 went to Lee Eun-sang.

== Rankings ==
The top 10 contestants will be determined by online and onsite voting, the results of which are announced at the end of each episode. The top 10 contestants during the final voting will determine the final group, while the 11th member of the final group will be decided by the total number of votes he has accumulated throughout the whole season.

Color key

New Top 10

#	Episode 1	Episode 2	Episode 3	Episode 5	Episode 6	Episode 8	Episode 11	Episode 12
1	Kim Min-kyu	Kim Yo-han ↑2	Kim Yo-han =	Kim Yo-han =	Kim Woo-seok ↑3	Kim Woo-seok =	Kim Yo-han ↑2	Kim Yo-han =
2	Koo Jung-mo	Lee Eun-sang ↑12	Kim Min-kyu ↑1	Kim Min-kyu =	Song Hyeong-jun ↑1	Lee Jin-hyuk ↑9	Kim Woo-seok ↓1	Kim Woo-seok =
3	Kim Yo-han	Kim Min-kyu ↓2	Lee Eun-sang ↓1	Song Hyeong-jun ↑1	Kim Min-kyu ↓1	Kim Yo-han ↑2	Lee Jin-hyuk ↓1	Han Seung-woo ↑1
4	Cha Jun-ho	Nam Do-hyon ↑33	Song Hyeong-jun ↑6	Kim Woo-seok ↑2	Lee Jin-woo ↑8	Song Hyeong-jun ↓2	Han Seung-woo ↑5	Song Hyeong-jun ↑4
5	Kim Woo-seok	Song Yu-vin ↑12	Nam Do-hyon ↓1	Lee Eun-sang ↓2	Kim Yo-han ↓4	Koo Jung-mo ↑3	Kim Min-kyu ↑5	Cho Seung-youn ↑1
6	Son Dong-pyo	Son Dong-pyo =	Kim Woo-seok ↑1	Nam Do-hyon ↓1	Lee Eun-sang ↓1	Lee Eun-sang =	Cho Seung-youn ↑11	Son Dong-pyo ↑6
7	Lee Yoo-jin	Kim Woo-seok ↓2	Son Dong-pyo ↓1	Son Dong-pyo =	Nam Do-hyon ↓1	Nam Do-hyon =	Nam Do-hyon =	Lee Han-gyul ↑9
8	Lee Se-jin	Park Sun-ho ↑28	Song Yu-vin ↓3	Song Yu-vin =	Koo Jung-mo ↑1	Lee Jin-woo ↓4	Song Hyeong-jun ↓4	Nam Do-hyon ↓1
9	Song Hyeong-jun	Koo Jung-mo ↓7	Koo Jung-mo =	Koo Jung-mo =	Song Yu-vin ↓1	Han Seung-woo ↑4	Lee Eun-sang ↓3	Cha Jun-ho ↑2
10	Lee Jin-woo	Song Hyeong-jun ↓1	Park Sun-ho ↓2	Ham Won-jin ↑2	Ham Won-jin =	Kim Min-kyu ↓7	Keum Dong-hyun ↑9	Kang Min-hee ↑4
X	—N/a	—N/a	—N/a	—N/a	—N/a	Kim Dong-yun	—N/a	Lee Eun-sang

=== First voting period ===
#	Episode 1 (Online votes)	Episode 2 (Online votes)	Episode 3 (Online votes)	Episode 4 (Live votes)		Episode 5 (Total votes)	
#	Episode 1 (Online votes)	Episode 2 (Online votes)	Episode 3 (Online votes)	Name	Votes	Name	Votes
1	Kim Min-kyu	Kim Yo-han	Kim Yo-han	Kim Hyun-bin	5,850	Kim Yo-han	1,094,299
2	Koo Jung-mo	Lee Eun-sang	Kim Min-kyu	Lee Woo-jin	5,270	Kim Min-kyu	1,033,132
3	Kim Yo-han	Kim Min-kyu	Lee Eun-sang	Wei Zi-yue	5,180	Song Hyeong-jun	1,024,849
4	Cha Jun-ho	Nam Do-hyon	Song Hyeong-jun	Kim Woo-seok	5,100	Kim Woo-seok	933,869
5	Kim Woo-seok	Song Yuvin	Nam Do-hyon	Won Hyuk	4,740	Lee Eun-sang	931,256
6	Son Dong-pyo	Son Dong-pyo	Kim Woo-seok	Kim Dong-yoon	4,710	Nam Do-hyon	844,597
7	Lee Eugene	Kim Woo-seok	Son Dong-pyo	Kim Yo-han	4,700	Son Dong-pyo	710,483
8	Lee Se-jin	Park Sun-ho	Song Yuvin	Choi Byung-chan	4,350	Song Yuvin	679,286
9	Song Hyeong-jun	Koo Jung-mo	Koo Jung-mo	Lee Jun-hyuk	3,173	Koo Jung-mo	669,616
10	Lee Jin-woo	Song Hyeong-jun	Park Sun-ho	Ham Won-jin	3,164	Ham Won-jin	578,263

Notes

- On Episode 4 (Group X Battle), an additional 3000 points are given to the boys of the winning teams and the trainee with highest votes got 10 times additional points from their votes.
- The ranking for Episode 5 is the result of combining online votes and live votes from the previous episode.

=== Second voting period ===
#	Episode 6 (Online votes)	Episode 7 (Live votes)		Episode 8 (Total votes)	
#	Episode 6 (Online votes)	Name	Votes	Name	Votes
1	Kim Woo-seok	Lee Jin-hyuk	336,000	Kim Woo-seok	1,728,930
2	Song Hyeong-jun	Kang Hyeon-su	161,600	Lee Jin-hyuk	1,480,425
3	Kim Min-kyu	Kim Woo-seok	160,600	Kim Yo-han	1,458,183
4	Lee Jin-woo	Won Hyuk	151,400	Song Hyeong-jun	1,418,328
5	Kim Yo-han	Koo Jung-mo	95,200	Koo Jung-mo	1,334,726
6	Lee Eun-sang	Hwang Yun-seong	61,200	Lee Eun-sang	1,313,074
7	Nam Do-hyon	Han Seung-woo	58,000	Nam Do-hyon	1,265,468
8	Koo Jung-mo	Lee Han-gyul	56,300	Lee Jin-woo	1,259,112
9	Song Yuvin	Song Yuvin	54,500	Han Seung-woo	1,248,496
10	Ham Won-jin	Nam Do-hyon	49,900	Kim Min-kyu	1,238,668

Notes

- On Episode 7 (Position Evaluation), 100 times additional points from their votes were given to the winner of each dance, rap and vocal groups while 100,000 points were given to the winner of each category. For X positions they were given 200 times additional points from their votes for the winner of each group while 200,000 points to the winner of X category.
- The ranking for Episode 8 is the result of combining online votes and live votes from the previous episode.

=== Third voting period ===
#	Episode 10 (Live votes)		Episode 11 (Total votes)	
#	Name	Votes	Name	Votes
1	Kim Yo-han	172,000	Kim Yo-han	582,503
2	Cho Seung-youn	72,500	Kim Woo-seok	457,477
3	Nam Do-hyon	55,000	Lee Jin-hyuk	351,174
4	Song Hyeong-jun	50,500	Han Seung-woo	329,581
5	Kim Woo-seok	20,115	Kim Min-kyu	290,944
6	Lee Eun-sang	20,095	Cho Seung-youn	281,580
7	Han Seung-woo	20,091	Nam Do-hyon	272,795
8	Hwang Yun-seong	20,036	Song Hyeong-Jun	242,818
9	Cha Jun-ho	20,031	Lee Eun-sang	230,716
10	Keum Donghyun	15,500	Keum Donghyun	187,264

Notes

- On Episode 10 (Concept Evaluation), 500 times additional points from their votes were given to the winner of each group while 200,000 points were given to the group with the highest votes. The 200,000 points were distributed as follows: 100,000 points for the trainee with the highest votes, and another 100,000 points were divided equally to the rest of the members.
- The ranking for Episode 11 is the result of combining online votes and live votes from the previous episode.

=== Result ===
The finale was held on July 19, 2019, and was broadcast live. Lee Dong-wook announced the unit boy group name, X1 (Hangul: 엑스원).

#	Episode 12 (Total votes)			
#	Name	Votes	Company	Accumulated Votes
1	Kim Yo-han	1,334,011	OUI Entertainment	4,468,996
2	Kim Woo-seok	1,304,033	TOP Media	4,424,309
3	Han Seung-woo	1,079,200	Plan A Entertainment	2,869,629
4	Song Hyeong-jun	1,049,222	Starship Entertainment	3,735,217
5	Cho Seung-youn	929,311	Yuehua Entertainment	2,200,382
6	Son Dong-pyo	824,389	DSP Media	2,762,824
7	Lee Han-gyul	794,411	MBK Entertainment	2,221,045
8	Nam Do-hyon	764,433	MBK Entertainment	3,147,303
9	Cha Jun-ho	756,939	Woollim Entertainment	2,449,408
10	Kang Min-hee	749,444	Starship Entertainment	1,798,609
X	Lee Eun-sang	689,489	Brand New Music	3,164,535

Notes

- X was chosen from accumulated votes from Episode 1 until Episode 12.

== Discography ==
=== Extended plays ===
Title	Details	Peak chart positions		Sales
Title	Details	JPN Hot	JPN Dig	Sales
31 Boys 5 Concepts	Released: July 5, 2019; Label: Stone Music Entertainment; Formats: Digital download	11	3	JPN: 4,202

=== Singles ===
Title	Year	Peak positions		Album
Title	Year	KOR	KOR Hot	Album
"X1-MA" (_지마)	2019	—	—	Non-album singles
"X1-MA" (piano ver.)	2019	—	—	Non-album singles
"Pretty Girl" (이뻐 이뻐)	2019	53	52	31 Boys 5 Concepts
"Super Special Girl"	2019	139	—	31 Boys 5 Concepts
"Move" (움직여)	2019	54	54	31 Boys 5 Concepts
"Monday to Sunday"	2019	122	—	31 Boys 5 Concepts
"U Got It"	2019	33	40	31 Boys 5 Concepts
"Boyness" (소년미 (少年美))	2019	88	—	Produce X 101 – Final
"To My World"	2019	94	—	Produce X 101 – Final
"Dream for You" (꿈을 꾼다)	2019	105	—	Produce X 101 – Final
"—" denotes releases that did not chart or were not released in that territory.

== Ratings ==
In this table, the blue numbers represent the lowest ratings and the red numbers represent the highest ratings.

Ep.	Broadcast date	Average audience share (AGB Nielsen)	
Ep.	Broadcast date	Nationwide	Seoul
1	May 3, 2019	1.448%	1.694%
2	May 10, 2019	2.309%	2.920%
3	May 17, 2019	2.130%	2.501%
4	May 24, 2019	2.244%	2.395%
5	May 31, 2019	2.102%	2.450%
6	June 7, 2019	2.230%	2.569%
7	June 14, 2019	2.019%	2.425%
8	June 21, 2019	2.183%	2.405%
9	June 28, 2019	2.508%	2.738%
10	July 5, 2019	2.314%	2.803%
11	July 12, 2019	2.220%	2.800%
12	July 19, 2019	3.892%	3.822%
Average		2.300%	2.627%

== Vote manipulation investigation ==
Several viewers suspected that Mnet had tampered with the total votes after noticing numerical patterns in the final episode. In response to the allegations, Mnet admitted that there were errors in calculating, but they also maintained that final rankings were correct and had no intention of changing X1's member line-up. 14 representatives from entertainment agencies of the 20 finalists held a meeting on July 29, 2019, and agreed to support Produce X 101's outcome and X1's debut.

On August 1, 2019, 272 viewers filed a lawsuit against Mnet for electoral fraud, as their on-site text voting service charged ₩100 per vote. Politician Ha Tae-kyung also condemned Mnet, stating that some of the numbers had a low probability of naturally occurring. On August 20, 2019, a search warrant was issued on CJ E&M offices and a text voting company by the Seoul Metropolitan Police Agency. During their first search, the police uncovered voice recordings of the staff members discussing vote manipulation on the previous seasons of the show, resulting in them extending their investigation to all four seasons of the Produce 101 series, Idol School, Show Me the Money, and Superstar K. Several brands cancelled their endorsement deals with X1 or put them on hold. In spite of this, X1's debut proceeded as planned.

On October 1, 2019, the Seoul Metropolitan Police Agency confirmed that votes from the eliminated trainees were added to the total votes of the members who debuted in X1, a process that affected 2–3 trainees who were originally in the top 11. The police issued a search and seizure warrant on the offices of Starship Entertainment, Woollim Entertainment, and MBK Entertainment. The police also investigated several agencies involved in Produce 48. Reportedly, per contract signed with CJ E&M, the entertainment agencies were paid ₩100,000 for every episode their talent appeared in. An anonymous trainee alleged only ₩1 million was given to their talent agencies for participating in a song, while each participant would only get a small percentage, and CJ E&M would keep additional profits if the song performed well. Some entertainment agencies who disagreed would request their talents to be eliminated at the last minute to withdraw them.

On October 15, 2019, MBC broadcast a feature on the vote rigging controversy on PD Note. Participants of Produce X 101 and Idol School and agency officials alleged anonymously that the production teams were biased to trainees they preferred, such as forcing song producers to give certain trainees more lines and providing them with more screen time. An anonymous trainee alleged that one trainee, under pressure from Starship Entertainment, was secretly informed about a mission in advance by one of the choreographers. He also alleged that some trainees knew the final rankings before the results were announced, and that a trainee from Woollim Entertainment was told by a team leader that only one person from their company would debut in X1.

Two trainees alleged that the center position for the theme song, "X1-MA", was originally assigned to a different contestant chosen by trainee vote before the producers changed it to audience vote it at the last minute. A fourth trainee claimed that many participants felt the show was biased towards trainees from Starship Entertainment. Staff members anonymously alleged that, for the final ranking results, only one off-site producer had counted the votes in a separate room and sent them the results via text message. Following the report, on October 16, 2019, the police began investigating whether the producers had accepted money for manipulating the votes. On October 17, 2019, Korea Communications Standards Commission revealed that they may fine Mnet up to ₩30 million for violating the Enforcement Decree of the Broadcasting Act.

On November 5, 2019, after approval from the Seoul National District Court, the police issued arrest warrants and travel bans for director Ahn Joon-young, chief producer Kim Yong-bum, a producer with the surname Lee, and Starship Entertainment's vice president Kim Kang-hyo, after they had attempted to destroy evidence. By evening, Ahn and Kim Yong-bum were arrested. During questioning, Ahn admitted to having manipulated the rankings for Produce 48 and Produce X 101. Police also found that Ahn had been using services from adult entertainment establishments in Gangnam paid for by various talent agencies approximately 40 times beginning from the second half of 2018, estimating to ₩100 million.

On May 29, 2020, director Ahn Joon-young and chief producer Kim Yong-bum have been sentenced to 2-year and 20 months of jail time respectively. On November 18, 2020, The 1st Criminal Division of the Seoul High Court sentenced CJ ENM's general producer Kim Yong-beom, who was charged with obstruction and fraud, to 1 year and 8 months in prison. On the same day, the judiciary also directly disclosed the names of the trainees who were unjustly eliminated, which included Anzardi Timothee (61st), whose first voting results were manipulated, Kim Kookheon (21st) and Lee Jinwoo (22nd), who were eliminated due to the manipulation of the third voting, and Koo Jung-mo (13th), Lee Jinhyuk (14th), and Keum Donghyun (17th), who were supposed to be in the 6th to 8th places of the final rankings.

== Aftermath ==
- X1 released their debut EP Emergency: Quantum Leap on August 27, 2019. However, due to circumstances surrounding the group's formation being under investigation as part of the Mnet voting manipulation scandal, the group ultimately disbanded on January 6, 2020, after an unsuccessful negotiation between the members' individual agencies about the group's future.
  - Several group members resumed activities for their respective agencies:
    - Han Seung-woo returned to Victon in January 2020 and rejoined group promotions for their sixth EP, Continuous, which was released on March 9, 2020. Seungwoo also debuted as a soloist with his debut EP, Fame, on August 10.
    - Lee Han-gyul and Nam Do-hyon formed the unit H&D and released the song "Toward Tomorrow" on February 5, 2020. The group released their first mini-album, Soulmate, on April 21, 2020. The duo later debuted in boy group BAE173 under MBK's PocketDol Studio, with their first EP, Intersection: Spark, on November 19. Nam Dohyon left the group on June 22, 2023 while Lee Hangyul participated in Starlight Boys (alongside fellow contestants Lee Junhyuk and Park Jinyeol), placing 6th in the finale and making his debut with Polarix under iQIYI.
    - Song Hyeong-jun and Kang Min-hee (alongside fellow contestants from Starship Entertainment Koo Jung-mo and Ham Won-jin) debuted as members of Starship's newest boy group Cravity with their debut EP Hideout: Remember Who We Are on April 14, 2020.
    - Kim Woo-seok debuted as a soloist with his debut extended play, 1st Desire: Greed, on May 25, 2020.
    - Cho Seung-youn resumed as a soloist under his Woodz moniker. He released his first mini-album, Equal, on June 29, 2020.
    - Lee Eun-sang debuted as a solo artist on August 31, 2020, with his debut mini-album Beautiful Scar. He debuted as part of Brand New Music's new group Younite on April 20, 2022, with their first extended play Youni-birth.
    - Kim Yo-han became a fixed cast member in the KBS variety show Battle of the Musicians, which began airing on April 25, 2020. He debuted as a soloist with his digital single "No More" produced by Zion.T on August 25, 2020. On October 5, 2020, he (alongside fellow contestant from OUI Kang Seok-hwa) debuted as a member of boy group WEi with their debut EP titled Identity: First Sight.
    - Cha Jun-ho (alongside Woollim contestants Hwang Yunseong, Kim Dongyoon, Lee Hyeop, Joo Changwook, and Kim Minseo) debuted as part of Woollim's new boygroup Drippin in 2020. Drippin released their debut EP, Boyager, on October 28.
    - Son Dong-pyo (alongside DSP Media contestant Lee Jun-hyuk) debuted as part of DSP Media's new boy group, Mirae, on March 17, 2021, with their mini album Killa.
Other contestants
- Some trainees debuted/re-joined with groups:
  - Plan A's Choi Byung-chan (left) returned to Victon.
  - TOP Media's Lee Jin-hyuk (14th) debuted as a soloist on November 4, 2019, with the mini-album S.O.L .
  - The Music Works's Song Yuvin (15th) & Kim Kookheon (21st) formed Kookheon X Yuvin on August 24, 2019, with the digital single Blurry after their group Myteen disbanded on August 20, 2019. They then debuted as the duo B.O.Y in January 2020.
  - Woollim's Hwang Yunseong (18th), Kim Dongyoon (23rd), Lee Hyeop (24th), Joo Changwook (29th) and Kim Minseo (52nd) released a single under the project group W Project 4 on September 2, 2019 Alongside former X1 member Cha Junho, the group debuted as Drippin through their debut EP, Boyager, on October 28.
  - Maroo's Lee Jinwoo (22nd), Lee Woojin (41st) & Lee Taeseung (53rd) debuted as Teen Teen on September 18, 2019, with the mini album Very, on Top. On September 23, 2020, they redebuted in the group Ghost9.
  - Brand New Music's Kim Sihun (27th), Yoon Jeonghwan (38th), and Hong Seongjun (51st) debuted in the group BDC, as part of their reality show Boys Don't Cry. They released their 1st single titled "Remember Me".
  - Vine's Baek Jin (36th) and ESteem's Park Yuri (40th) debuted in a project group called JxR on December 5, 2019.
  - Starship's Koo Jungmo and Ham Wonjin (alongside former X1 members Song Hyeongjun and Kang Minhee) debuted as members of boy group Cravity with their debut album Hideout: Remember Who We Are on April 14, 2020.
  - E Entertainment's Won Hyuk (33rd) and Lee Wonjun (47th) debuted as members of boy group E'Last with the debut album Day Dream on June 9, 2020.
  - C9 Entertainment's Keum Donghyun (17th) debuted as a member of Epex with their first EP titled Bipolar Pt.1: Prelude of Anxiety on June 8, 2021.
- Some trainees joined new companies:
  - Lee Hyeop (24th) signed with Woollim Entertainment and debuted with their boy group Drippin with their debut EP, Boyager, on October 28.
  - Kang Seokhwa (35th) signed with OUI Entertainment, and debuted as a member of boy group WEi with their debut EP Identity: First Sight on October 5, 2020.
  - Jung Youngbin (68th) signed with DS Entertainment
  - Lee Eugene (55th) signed with Namoo Actors, where he will promote under the name Yu Jinwoo
- Some trainees left their agencies or groups.
  - Kim Sunghyun (44th) left In2It On September 5, 2019, for personal reasons.
  - Moon Junho (59th) left Woollim Entertainment
  - Mahiro Hidaka (49th) and Wang Jyunhao (58th) left YG Entertainment and signed with OUI Entertainment. However, on January 4, 2020, OUI announced that both Mahiro and Jyunhao have left the company.
  - Moon Hyunbin (32nd) left Starship Entertainment and debuted as the leader of Ciipher under Rain Company.
  - Yoon Seobin (left) left JYP and joined Sublime Artist Agency.
  - Kim Hyeonbin (30th) left Source Music and joined WM Entertainment. He later then left WM Entertainment and joined CUBE Entertainment where he debuted with the group Nowadays.
  - Choi Jun-seong (46th) left Jellyfish Entertainment and debuted in Ghost9 under Maroo Entertainment.
  - Woo Je-won (54th) left Around Us Entertainment and joined FirstOne Entertainment and will debut in the group NINE.i.
- Some trainees participated in other survival shows:
  - Jun Uehara (91st) participated in Produce 101 Japan He unfortunately didn't make it into the cut and ranked 20th.
  - Kang Hyeonsu (26th) and Park Yunsol (48th) participated in G-Egg. Both members won the competition and will debut in the boys group NIK.
  - Tony (20th) participated in the third season of Chinese survival show Youth With You 3
  - Wei Ziyue (43rd) participated in the fourth season of Chinese survival show Produce Camp 2021. He failed to make his debut and ranked 31st.
  - Jeong Jae-hoon (39th), Park Yu-ri (40th), Anzardi Timothee (61st), and Park Jin-yeol (81st) participated in "Extreme Debut: Wild Idol."
  - Kim Dongbin (42nd) participated in Asia Super Young.
  - Kim Minseo (82nd) participated in Loud, but was eliminated in the first round.
  - Choi Suhwan (28th), Kang Seokhwa (35th), and Hong Seongjun (51st) participated in the vocal survival show Build Up: Vocal Boy Group Survival
  - Kim Sihun (27th), Choi Byunghoon (98th), and Im Siu (left) participated in Project 7.
  - Lee Junhyuk (75th) and Park Jinyeol (81st; as Park Siwoo) participated in Starlight Boys alongside former X1 member Lee Hangyul. Lee Junhyuk placed 2nd in the finale, making his debut with Polarix under iQIYI.
  - Kwon Heejun (56th) and Steven Kim (72nd) participated in Universe League. Steven Kim placed 2nd in the finale, making his debut with AHOF under F&F Entertainment.
  - Kim Dongyoon (23rd) and Lee Hyeop (24th) participated in Boys 2 Planet. Lee Hyeop was eliminated in the second episode after ranking 84th, and Kim Dongyun was eliminated in the eighth episode after ranking 43rd.
