= Moon Seung-you =

South Korean actress (born 1996)

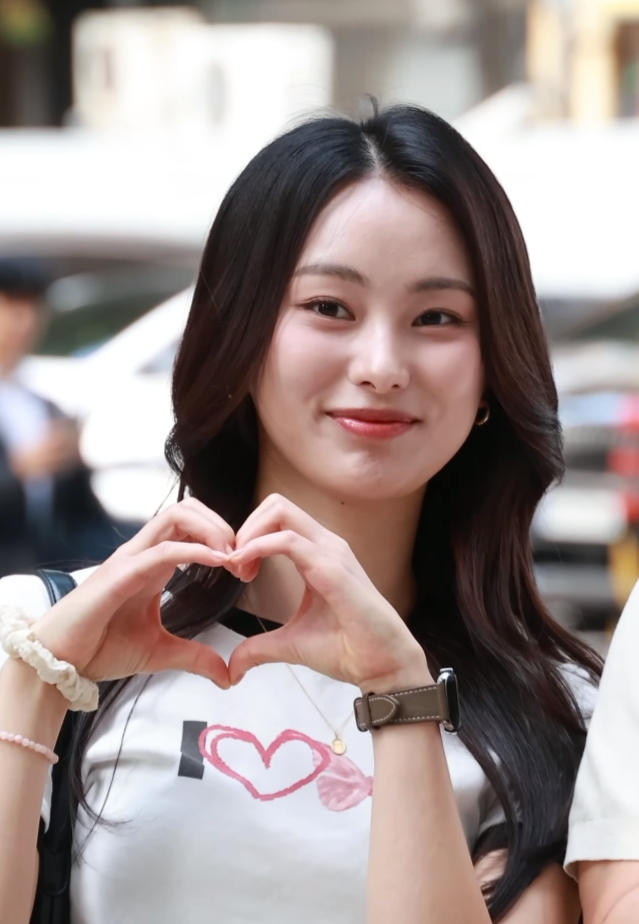
- Moon in 2025
- Born: April 4, 1996 (age 30); South Korea
- Occupation: Actress
- Years active: 2018–present
- Agent: Mint ENT

Korean name
- Hangul: 문승유
- RR: Mun Seungyu
- MR: Mun Sŭngyu

Moon Seung-you (Korean: 문승유; born April 4, 1996) is a South Korean actress.

== Early life and career ==
Moon was born in 1996. She spent her middle school years in Singapore. Upon returning to South Korea, she initially planned to attend a foreign language high school but instead enrolled in an arts high school, where she majored in practical music. In 2017, she appeared as a contestant on JTBC's survival program Mix Nine, but was eliminated. Around this time, a web drama she had filmed while attending college gained attention. She later stated that although she received criticism for portraying a villain, the experience was significant for her. She noted that her self-esteem was low at the time, and taking on a role and receiving positive feedback provided her with a new perspective. Following this, she decided to end her activities as a trainee and pursue acting. She made her acting debut in a short film in 2018.

In 2026, she signed with Mint ENT.

== Filmography ==
=== Film ===
Year	Title	Role	Ref.
2021	Midnight		

=== Television series ===
Key
†	Denotes television productions that have not yet been released

Year	Title	Role	Notes	Ref.
2018	Room of Her Own			
2021	Be My Dream Family			
2022	The Golden Spoon	Lee Seung-ah		
2023	Heartbeat	Rose		
2024	Knight Flower	young Jo Yeo-hwa		
2024	Wedding Impossible	Na Soo-jung		
2025	Bon Appétit, Your Majesty	Ya Fei Xiu		
2025	Would You Marry Me?	Kim Jin-hwa		
2026	A Bona Fide Killer	Moon Da-rae		
2026	Dive into You	Son Ye-rang		

=== Television show ===
Year	Title	Role	Ref.
2017	Mix Nine	Contestant	
