= Love, Take Two =

2025 South Korean television series

- Promotional poster
- Hangul: 첫, 사랑을 위하여
- Lit.: For The First Love
- RR: Cheot, sarangeul wihayeo
- MR: Ch'ŏt, sarangŭl wihayŏ
- Genre: Romance; Family
- Written by: Sung Woo-jin
- Directed by: Yoo Je-won; Ham Seung-hun
- Starring: Yum Jung-ah; Park Hae-joon; Choi Yoon-ji; Kim Min-kyu; Kim Sun-young; Yang Kyung-won
- Music by: Im Ha-young
- Country of origin: South Korea
- Original language: Korean
- No. of episodes: 12

Production
- Executive producers: Lee Young-wook; Ham Seung-hoon
- Producers: Kim Nu-ri; Kim Min-young; Jang Kyung-ik; Yoo Sang-won; Park Ju-yeon
- Production companies: Studio Dragon; Showrunners

Original release
- Network: tvN
- Release: August 4 – September 9, 2025

Love, Take Two (Korean: 첫, 사랑을 위하여) is a 2025 South Korean romance family television series written by Sung Woo-jin, directed by Yoo Je-won, and starring Yum Jung-ah, Park Hae-joon, Choi Yoon-ji, and Kim Min-kyu. It aired on tvN from August 4, to September 9, 2025, every Monday and Tuesday at 20:50 (KST).

The drama is available on Viu in selected regions, such as Singapore and the Philippines.

== Synopsis ==
In Cheonghae Village, the lives of two single parents and their children intertwine. Lee Ji-an, a fierce and dignified construction site manager, is a devoted single mother to her daughter, Lee Hyo-ri. Her first love, Ryu Jeong-seok, is a single father and an architect who, despite his cold exterior, is defenseless against Lee Ji-an. Their children, Lee Hyo-ri and Ryu Bo-hyeon, also find themselves on a path toward each other. Lee Hyo-ri, once a promising medical student, is thrown into a world of uncertainty after a brain tumor diagnosis forces her to stray from her planned future. Meanwhile, Ryu Bo-hyeon, a confident young man who has spent six years working on a flower farm, meets Lee Hyo-ri in the quiet village. Their chance meeting sparks new emotions, bringing the two families closer in an unexpected way.

== Cast ==
=== Main ===
- Yum Jung-ah as Lee Ji-an
  - Won Yoo-jin as young Lee Ji-an

A charismatic site manager who takes charge of construction sites and Hyo-ri's mother.

- Park Hae-joon as Ryu Jeong-seok
  - Jang Deok-su as young Ryu Jeong-seok

A renowned architect who has won an international architecture award and Bo-hyeon's father.

- Choi Yoon-ji as Lee Hyo-ri

Ji-an's daughter who is a third-year medical student. From a model medical student who was her mother Ji-an's pride, she's now a wayward youth who has gone astray.

- Kim Min-kyu as Ryu Bo-hyeon

Jeong-seok's son who runs a flower farm. A definite standout among young farmers and a ray of sunshine in Cheonghae Village.

- Kim Sun-young as Kim Sun-young

Ji-an's loyal best friend and a restaurant owner at the construction site, famously known as "Chef Kim" for her unbeatable cooking skills.

- Yang Kyung-won as Yoon Tae-oh

A free-spirited, hip guy and the hippie of the seaside village who runs a surf club.

=== Supporting ===
==== Cheonghae Village Residents ====
- Kim Mi-kyung as Jeong Moon-hee

A mysterious individual.

- Kang Ae-shim as Granny Mimi

The owner of Mimi's Store and a pillar of the community, whose name is Kim Mal-soon.

- Jung Young-joo as Chief Go

The village head and a rice farmer.

- Park Soo-young as Chief Go's husband

A rice farmer who is seemingly laid-back but kind-hearted man from Chungcheong Province.

==== People around Bo-hyeon ====
- Jeong Hoe-rin as Kim So-yeon

Flower farm, grows specialty crops. Heiress to the farming business.

- Lee Tae-hoon as Yoo Dong-seok

Restaurant, the youngest son of 'Dongseok Butcher Restaurant' at the village entrance.

- Jo Beom-gyu as Lee Jae-dong

A young farmer responsible for 2 hectares of organic onion fields.

==== People around Hyo-ri ====
- Yang Yoo-jin as Lee Sook

College student, Hyo-ri's best friend who understands her with just a look.

- Nam Min-woo as Kim Byeong-jae

Architect, an employee at Ryu Architecture Office.

- Geum Min-kyung as Han Cho-rong

Ji-an's childhood best friend.

==== Ji-an's Construction Company co-workers ====
- Yang Hyun-min as CEO of TW Construction

CEO of TW Construction, the company Ji-an works for, a man who has easily thrown away his manners and integrity.

- Jang Joon-hwi as Foreman Ahn

Construction site foreman, Ji-an's co-worker.

- Park Kyung-chan as Manager Jeong

TW Construction employee, Ji-an's co-worker.

- Actor as Oh Jong-soo

Ji-an's junior co-worker.

- No Ki-yong as Kim Cheol-min

Ji-an's junior co-worker.

==== Others ====
- Yoo In

=== Special appearances ===
- Kim Da-hee
- Jung Man-sik as Foreman Hwang

Ji-an's co-worker.

- Seo Young-hee as Hwang Hyun-soon

Ji-an's mother.

== Production ==
=== Development ===
In August 2024, the series was developed under the working title First, For Love. The drama was written by Yang Hee-soon, who won the Excellence Award in the 2017 SBS Cultural Foundation Screenplay Contest for Bolbbalgan Menopause and directed by Yoo Je-won. It was planned and produced by Studio Dragon and Showrunner. In March 2025, the writer is credited with the pen name Sung Woo-jin.

=== Casting ===
Yum Jung-ah was reported to have been cast in November 2024. Park Hae-joon joined the cast in December. The main cast, which includes Yum Jung-ah, Park Hae-joon, Choi Yoon-ji, and Kim Min-kyu, was officially confirmed in March 2025. In May, 2025, it was revealed that the drama is set to release in August as a tvN Monday-Tuesday drama, along with the confirmation of the supporting cast, including Kim Sun-young, Yang Kyung-won, Kim Mi-kyung, Kang Ae-shim, Jung Young-joo, and Park Soo-young. Script reading photos were also released.

=== Filming ===
The cast participated in a script reading on March 17, 2025.

== Release ==
Love, Take Two premiered on tvN on August 4, 2025. It airs every Monday and Tuesday at 20:50 (KST). Prior to this, on July 31, 2025, the online video service Wavve confirmed that it will simultaneously release the drama. This marks the first time in Wavve's history that a new tvN drama will be released simultaneously.

== Original soundtrack ==
Love, Take Two Original Soundtrack

Soundtrack album by Various artists
- Released: August 2025
- Genre: Soundtrack
- Languages: Korean; English
- Labels: CSMUSIC& Studio

=== Part 1 ===
Released on August 5, 2025
No.	Title	Lyrics	Music	Artist	Length
1.	"Lover"	SeimSame	SeimSame	Choi Jeong-eun, member of Izna	3:15
2.	"Lover" (Inst.)		SeimSame		3:15
Total length:					6:30

=== Part 2 ===
Released on August 12, 2025
No.	Title	Lyrics	Music	Artist	Length
1.	"Love Comes To You"	Donna	Donna; now; Michel,the시영Parker	Olivia Marsh	4:11
2.	"Love Comes To You" (Inst.)		Donna; now; Michel,the시영Parker		4:11
Total length:					8:22

== Viewership ==
Love, Take Two : South Korea viewers per episode (thousands)

Season	Episode number												Average
Season	1	2	3	4	5	6	7	8	9	10	11	12	Average
1	802	819	799	863	N/A	894	817	983	823	778	787	TBD	TBD

Source: Audience measurement performed nationwide by Nielsen Media Research.

Average TV viewership ratings
Ep.	Original broadcast date	Average audience share (Nielsen Korea)	
Ep.	Original broadcast date	Nationwide	Seoul
1	August 4, 2025	3.531% (1st)	3.998% (1st)
2	August 5, 2025	3.536% (1st)	3.768% (1st)
3	August 11, 2025	3.566% (1st)	3.737% (1st)
4	August 12, 2025	3.778% (1st)	4.038% (1st)
5	August 18, 2025	3.5% (1st)	4.0% (1st)
6	August 19, 2025	3.985% (1st)	4.087% (1st)
7	August 25, 2025	3.817% (1st)	4.233% (1st)
8	August 26, 2025	4.409% (1st)	4.417% (1st)
9	September 1, 2025	3.873% (1st)	4.235% (1st)
10	September 2, 2025	3.749% (2nd)	3.629% (1st)
11	September 8, 2025	3.921% (2nd)	4.374% (2nd)
12	September 9, 2025	4.210% (2nd)	4.194% (1st)
Average			
In the table above, the blue numbers represent the lowest ratings and the red numbers represent the highest ratings.; This drama airs on a cable channel/pay TV which normally has a relatively smaller audience compared to free-to-air TV/public broadcasters (KBS, SBS, MBC, and EBS).
