= Bitch x Rich =

South Korean web series

- Promotional poster for season 2
- Also known as: Crazy X Rich
- Hangul: 청담국제고등학교
- Lit.: Cheongdam International High School
- RR: Cheongdam gukje godeunghakgyo
- MR: Ch'ŏngdam kukche kodŭnghakkyo
- Genre: Youth, Mystery
- Written by: Jeong Seung-eun (S1); Kwak Young-im (S2)
- Directed by: Min Ji-young; Lim Dae-woong (S2); Park Hyung-won (S2)
- Starring: Lee Eun-saem; Kim Ye-rim
- Country of origin: South Korea
- Original language: Korean
- No. of seasons: 2
- No. of episodes: 20

Production
- Running time: 35 minutes
- Production company: Whynot Media

Original release
- Network: Wavve
- Release: May 31, 2023 – present

Bitch x Rich (Korean: 청담국제고등학교) is a South Korean web drama that premiered in 2023. Produced by Whynot Media, the series blends mystery and school drama elements, following the tense psychological warfare between students at a prestigious high school. The show is directed by Min Ji Young and written by Jung Sung Eun, starring Lee Eun-saem and Kim Ye-rim.

The series is available on streaming platforms Wavve and Netflix in South Korea, and Viu in selected regions, such as Singapore.

The second season premiered on July 3, 2025. It is also available on various global streaming platforms such as Viu, Viki, and Netflix in 190 countries. The third season is scheduled air in 2027.

== Synopsis ==
The story revolves around Kim Hye In, a high school student from an impoverished background. Her life takes a drastic turn when she becomes the sole witness to the murder of a fellow student. In exchange for her silence, she is given the opportunity to transfer to Cheongdam International High School, the most prestigious school in South Korea. Once enrolled, Kim Hye In comes face-to-face with Baek Je Na, the most influential student at Cheongdam High and the prime suspect in the murder case. Their relationship quickly escalates into a psychological battle, filled with tension and power struggles, as Kim Hye In navigates the ruthless hierarchy of the elite school.

== Cast ==
=== Introduced in Season 1 ===
- Lee Eun-saem as Kim Hye-in
- Kim Ye-rim as Baek Je-na
- Lee Jong-hyuk as Seo Do-eon
- Park Si-woo as Min Yul Hee
- Jang Deok-su as Park Woo Jin
- Yoo Jung-hoo as Lee So-mang
- Jang Sung-yoon as Kim Hae In

=== Introduced in Season 2 ===
- Kim Min-kyu as Cha Jin Wook
- Won Kyu-bin as Lee Sa Rang

== Release ==
The drama aired from May 31, 2023, to June 28, 2023, with episodes released every Wednesday. The total number of episodes is 10, each with a runtime of approximately 35 minutes. The show is available on Wavve and Netflix in South Korea.

Season 1 of Bitch x Rich topped the major streaming platforms in Asia. It ranked #1 on ABEMA TV's Hallyu Contents category, #2 in Viu Indonesia, #3 in Viu Singapore, and Friday Video of Taiwan. Adding to this, it also entered the top 10 of the iQIYI and Netflix global charts, establishing itself as a global hit with both genre freshness and immersion.

On May 26, 2025, it was announced that Season 2 of the web drama will premiere the first week of July. Actors Kim Min-gyu and Won Kyu-bin will be joining the new season as Cha Jin-uk and Lee Sa-rang respectively.

On October 6, 2026, a third season titled Bitch x Rich: Royal Camp was announced, with Hong Ye-ji, Miyeon, Hyunsuk, and Kim Min-gi cast as the new main characters. It is scheduled to air in 2027.

== Reception ==
Bitch x Rich gained attention for its gripping storyline and engaging character dynamics. It marked the first leading role for actress Lee Eun Saem since her debut and was her first lead role in a web drama since Revenge Note (2017). Several cast members, including Lee Jong Hyuk, Yoo Jung Hoo, and Park Si Woo, had previously worked with Whynot Media.

The show's title and setting reflect themes of privilege and exclusivity, with Cheongdam International High School symbolizing an aristocratic education system. The name combines Cheongdam-dong, a well-known affluent neighborhood in South Korea, with the concept of an international high school.
