= Dive into You =

2026 South Korean television series

- Promotional poster
- Hangul: 너에게 다이브
- RR: Neoege daibeu
- MR: Nŏege taibŭ
- Genre: Fantasy; Romantic comedy
- Written by: Kim Bo-geum; Lee On
- Directed by: So Jae-hyun
- Starring: Kim Ji-yeon; Park Seo-ham; Jang Se-hyuk; Moon Seung-you
- Music by: Heo Sung-jin
- Country of origin: South Korea
- Original language: Korean
- No. of episodes: 12

Production
- Running time: 70 minutes
- Production companies: Dexter Pictures; Amuse Entertainment; Rakuten Viki

Original release
- Network: Channel A
- Release: September 26 – November 1, 2026

Dive into You (Korean: 너에게 다이브) is a 2026 South Korean fantasy romantic comedy television series written by Kim Bo-geum and Lee On, directed by So Jae-hyun, and starring Kim Ji-yeon, Park Seo-ham, Jang Se-hyuk, and Moon Seung-you. The series aired on Channel A from September 26, to November 1, 2026, every Saturday and Sunday at 22:40 (KST). It is also available for streaming on Disney+ in South Korea and Rakuten Viki in selected regions.

== Premise ==
Yoon Ha-na and Yoon Ha-ru discover an old camcorder and use the device to travel back to their 18-year-old past, they attempt to alter destiny and rescue their childhood best friend and first love, Jung Woo-jae, from a tragic fate.

== Cast and characters ==
=== Main ===
- Kim Ji-yeon as Yoon Ha-na

A top actress who experiences emotional numbness and travels back to her youth using a mysterious camcorder to save her first love.

- Park Seo-ham as Jung Woo-jae

Ha-na's childhood friend and bodyguard. Formerly a judo athlete, he maintains a long-standing devotion to Ha-na.

- Jang Se-hyuk as Yoon Ha-ru

Ha-na's twin brother and a national judo gold medalist whose soul swaps with his sister's during the time-slip.

- Moon Seung-you as Son Ye-rang

Ha-na's agency representative and Ha-ru's partner.

=== Supporting ===
- Lee Ah-jun as Seok-min

Ha-na's manager.

- Ha Do-kwon as Yoon Chang-shik

Ha-na and Ha-ru's father who operates a 24-hour raw fish restaurant.

- Park Mi-hyun as Jung Young-sook

Ha-na and Ha-ru's mother.

- Kang Hyung-suk as Yang Jun-mo

Ha-na's university senior and a film director.

- Kim Han-young as Lee Hyung-won

Woo-jae's rival in judo.

=== Special appearance ===
- Zo Zazz as the street vendor who provides the camcorder

== Production ==
=== Development and casting ===
In December 2023, Dive into You alongside other projects was confirmed in development under Dexter Pixtures, a content production subsidiary of Dexter Studios. It is directed by So Jae-hyun, and written by Kim Bo-geum and Lee On.

In March 2026, the series was announced as a joint production between South Korea's Dexter Pictures and Japan's Amuse Entertainment. Park Seo-ham and Kim Ji-yeon were reportedly cast as leads. By May 2026, the appearances of Park and Kim along with Jang Se-hyuk and Moon Seung-you were confirmed. On the same month, Rakuten Viki co-ventured in investment and production.

=== Music ===
On September 23, 2026, NHN Link revealed the OST artists lineup for the series including Rei of Ive, Mingi of Ateez, Kangnam, Jeon Geon-ho, Lee Min-hyuk, and Jung Ye-won.

== Release ==
Dive into You was confirmed to be released globally on Rakuten Viki. The series' premiere date was confirmed to be on September 26, 2026, on Channel A and will air every Saturday and Sunday at 22:40 (KST). It will also be available for streaming on Disney+ in South Korea.

== Ratings ==
Average TV viewership ratings (nationwide)
Ep.	Original broadcast date	Average audience share (Nielsen Korea)
1	September 26, 2026	0.3% (47th)
2	September 27, 2026	0.5% (33rd)
3	October 3, 2026	0.6% (25th)
4	October 4, 2026	0.4% (37th)
5	October 10, 2026	0.3% (43rd)
6	October 11, 2026	0.3% (40th)
7	October 17, 2026	0.2% (51st)
8	October 18, 2026	0.5% (34th)
9	October 24, 2026	0.2% (53rd)
10	October 25, 2026	0.3% (46th)
11	October 31, 2026	0.1% (72nd)
12	November 1, 2026	0.4% (41st)
Average		0.3%
In the table above, the blue numbers represent the lowest ratings and the red numbers represent the highest ratings.; This drama aired on a cable channel/pay TV which normally has a relatively smaller audience compared to free-to-air TV/public broadcasters (KBS, SBS, MBC, and EBS).
