= Kim Min-kyu (entertainer) =

South Korean actor (born 2001)

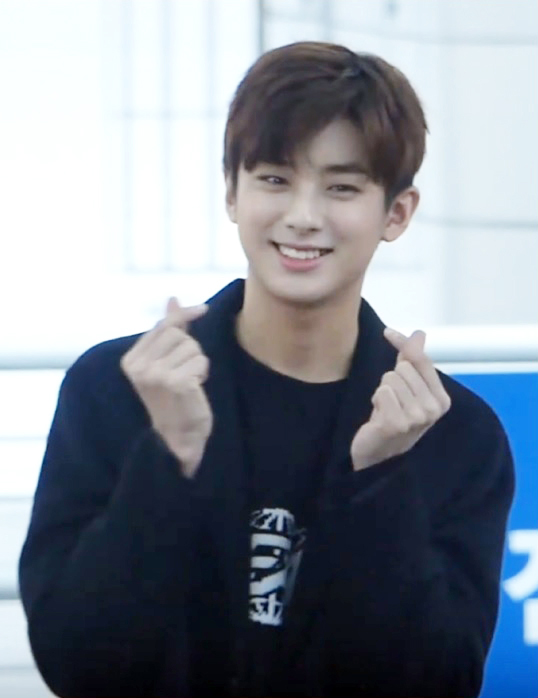
- Kim in November 2019
- Born: March 12, 2001 (age 25); Gumi, North Gyeongsang, South Korea
- Occupations: Actor; model
- Years active: 2019–present
- Agent: BH Entertainment

Korean name
- Hangul: 김민규
- Hanja: 金旻奎
- RR: Gim Mingyu
- MR: Kim Min'gyu

Kim Min-kyu (Korean: 김민규, born March 12, 2001) is a South Korean actor, model and singer. He has been cast in the Playlist's web drama Pop Out Boy! as the male lead Chun Nam-wook in 2020 and as Seo Ji-han in Idol: The Coup.

== Early life ==
Kim was born on March 12, 2001, in Gumi, North Gyeongsang, South Korea. He has a younger sister who is two years younger. He studied at Munhyeon Elementary School, Hwaam Middle School and Moonhyeon High School. He was transferred to Youngdong High School due to work commitments.

== Career ==
=== 2019: Produce X 101, modeling, first award ===
In March 2019, Kim represented Jellyfish Entertainment together with fellow trainee Choi Jun-Seong on the reality survival show Produce X 101 for the chance to debut in a Mnet boy group. He ranked 12th on the finale of Produce X 101 and was eliminated from the final lineup, barely missing the mark to becoming the member of X1. Despite his elimination, Kim's appearance on the show led him to receive many advertisement offers.

On August 21, he became the first male model for the beauty brand Banila Co.. He also partook in multiple magazine shoots like DAZED, NYLON and Grazia. On September 23, he was chosen as a model for the American clothing retailer Guess. On December 5, he was cast to host MBC Music's new program Pink Festa. On December 7, he held his first fan-sign for Banila Co.. December 16, he held 'Nineteen, Minkyu' in Japan. On December 17, he won the Hot Rookie Award on First Brand Awards 2020.

=== 2020–present: Hosting, acting debut and departure from Jellyfish ===
On February 7, 2020, Kim was chosen as one of the new hosts for SBS M's music program The Show alongside The Boyz's Juyeon and Everglow's Sihyeon.

In June 2020, Kim made his acting debut in Playlist's web drama "Pop Out Boy!" as the male lead Chun Nam-wook.

On August 10, 2023, it has been announced that he decided not to renew his contract with Jellyfish and signed with new agency Kang Entertainment.

In August 2026, Kim signed an exclusive contract with BH Entertainment.

== Discography ==
=== Soundtrack appearances ===
Title	Year	Album
"Talking to the Moon" (with Hani)	2021	Idol: The Coup OST
"To U" (with Jo Joon-young)	2021	Idol: The Coup OST
"Tonight" (오늘 밤) (with Lee Eun-sang, Hong Eun-ki featuring Green)	2021	Idol: The Coup OST

== Filmography ==
=== Television series ===
Year	Title	Role	Ref.
2021	Idol: The Coup	Seo Ji-han	
2023–2024	Maestra: Strings of Truth	Kim Tae-ho	
2024	Missing Crown Prince	Grand Prince Doseong	
2025	Love, Take Two	Ryu Bo-hyeon	

=== Web series ===
Year	Title	Role	Notes	Ref.
2020	Pop Out Boy!	Chun Nam-wook		
2022	Seasons of Blossom	Lee Jae-min		
2022	The Fabulous	Shim Do-young		
2025	Bitch x Rich	Cha Jin-wook	Season 2	

=== Television shows ===
Year	Title	Role	Notes	Ref.
2019	Produce X 101	Contestant	Finished 12th	
2019	Pink Fiesta	Host		
2020–2021	The Show	Host	With Kim Si-hyeon and Juyeon	
2022	Style Me	Host	Season 3	

=== Web shows ===
Year	Title	Role	Notes	Ref.
2020	Friendship Tour: Like It	Cast member	with Lee Jin-hyuk and Lee Se-jin	
2021	Friendship Tour 2	Cast member	with Lee Jin-hyuk, Lee Se-jin and Choi Byung-chan	

== Ambassadorship ==
Year	Title	Ref.
2019	Banila Co.	
2020	Miral Welfare Foundation Ambassador of Goodwill	

== Awards ==
Award	Year	Category	Nominee / Work	Result	Ref.
First Brand Awards	2019	Hot Rookie Award	Minkyu	Won	
