= Drippin =

South Korean boy band

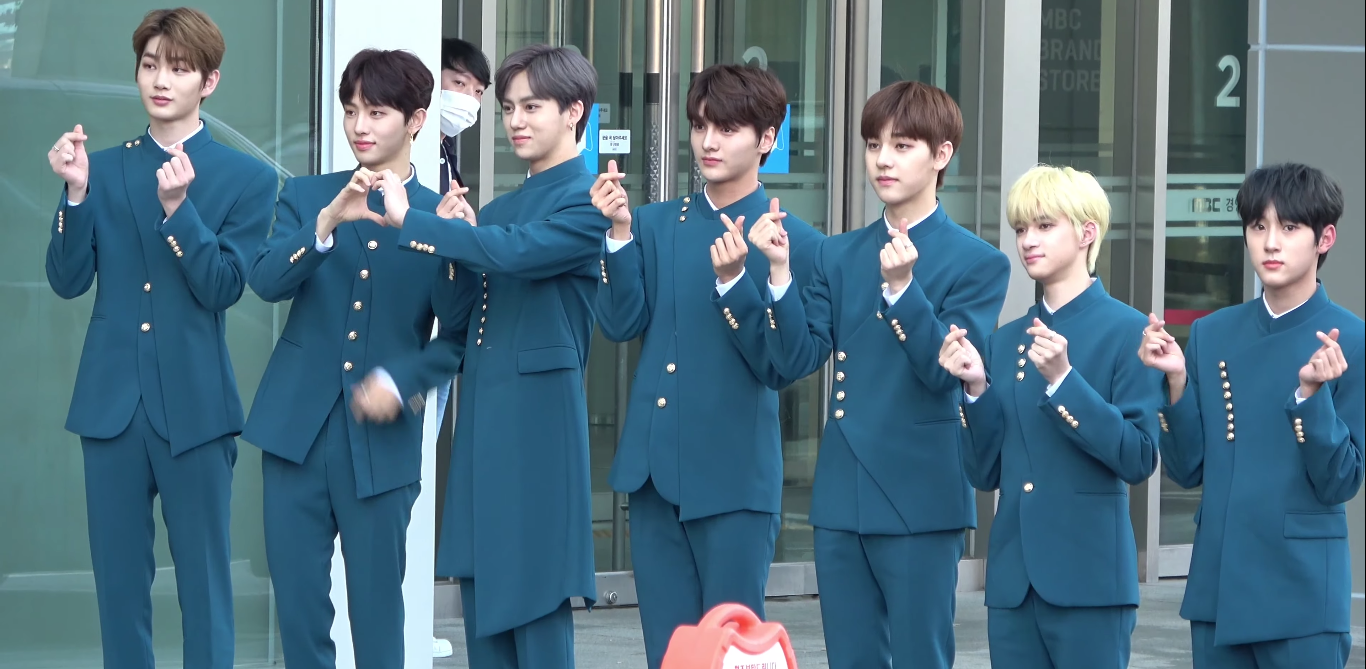
- Drippin in November 2020; From left: Changuk, Hyeop, Yunseong, Junho, Dongyun, Alex, and Minseo

Background information
- Origin: Seoul, South Korea
- Genres: K-pop; drum and bass; R&B; new wave; funk
- Years active: 2020–present
- Labels: Woollim; Mercury Tokyo
- Spinoffs: ChaDongHyeop
- Members: Yunseong; Hyeop; Changuk; Dongyun; Minseo; Junho
- Past members: Alex
- Website: Official Page; Japan Official Page

Drippin (Korean: 드리핀, stylized in all caps) is a South Korean boy band formed by Woollim Entertainment in 2020. The group is composed of six members: Hyeop, Yunseong, Changuk, Dongyun, Minseo, and Junho. Drippin was originally a seven-member group; Alex departed from the group on July 28, 2023 due to poor health conditions and anxiety concerns. The group officially debuted on October 28, 2020, with the EP Boyager.

== Name ==
The group's name, Drippin, is based on terms meaning stylish and impressive, and is a group that participates in music, fashion, and trends with its various characteristics. It includes the goal to become a group and establish a record in the music industry.

== Career ==
=== Pre-debut ===
Prior to debut, all of the members except for Alex competed in the competition reality show Produce X 101, with Cha Jun-ho finishing ninth in the program and thus becoming a member of the project group X1. The remaining members with an additional trainee named Lee Sung-jun (now a part of the group Blank2y) released the single "1M1S" under the name W Project 4. The single charted at number 81 on Billboard's K-pop Hot 100.

=== 2020–2021: Debut and subsequent releases ===
In September 2020, Woollim Entertainment announced that would be debuting boy group composed of seven members called Drippin. They released the reality program through KT's Seezn, We are Drippin, documenting the process leading up to their debut. The group debuted on October 28 with the release of their first extended play, Boyager, a combination of the word "boy" and "voyager" after the Voyager program.

On March 16, 2021, Drippin released their second EP, A Better Tomorrow, with the lead single "Young Blood".

On June 29, 2021, Drippin released their first single album, "Free Pass", with the lead single of the same name.

On November 11, 2021, Drippin released the promotional single "Vertigo" through Universe Music for the mobile application, Universe.

=== 2022–2023: Villain trilogy, Japanese debut, Alex’s departure ===
On January 17, 2022, Their third EP, Villain, was released with the lead single of the same name.

On May 18, 2022, Drippin made their Japanese debut with the single "So Good".

On June 15, 2022, Drippin continue their Villain series with released their second single album, "Villain: Zero". The single consists of three track including the lead single "Zero", "Game" and "Trick and Treat".

On November 15, 2022, Drippin released their first studio album, Villain: The End. The album contains ten track including the lead single "The One" revealed as drum and bass genre. The album originally set to be released on November 1 and later on October 30, it was announced the postponement of the album due to the national mourning period following the Seoul Halloween crowd crush incident on the 29th.

On January 26, 2023, Woollim Entertainment announced that Alex's activities would be temporarily suspended due to his health.

Drippin release their second Japanese single "Hello Goodbye" on March 15 as a six-piece due to Alex's hiatus. They also held a showcase at Tokyo's Ebisu Liquid Room on March 14.

The group's third single album "Seven Sins" was released on April 19. The single composed of three tracks including the lead single of the same name, "Stereo" and "Bad Blood". To commence the single promotion, the group released short movie titled EDEN through CGV on May 17.

On July 2, Drippin successfully held their first fanmeeting since debut "Summer Day's Dream" at YES24 LIVE HALL.

On July 28, Woollim Entertainment released a statement announcing Alex's departure from Drippin and the termination of his exclusive contract, with the group to reorganize and continue their activities with the remaining six members.

=== 2024: Beautiful Maze and Weekend ===
Ahead of the group's comeback, Changuk was announced to take a break due to poor health and the group would temporarily continue promotions as five-member group. On April 3, 2024, Drippin released their fourth single album "Beautiful Maze" which contains three tracks including the lead single of the same name. The single sold more than 120,000 copies three days after release, breaking their previous record for "Seven Sins" which sold 14,000 copies in the first weeks.

On August 19, their fifth single album "Weekend" was released, with summer fairytale concept. The single surpassed 190,000 copies on the first weeks of release, making the group's new personal record.

=== 2025: Yunseong's enlistment and survival program ===
On March 19, 2025, Yunseong through handwritten announcing his enlistment on March 24.

In May 2025, Hyeop and Dongyun were announced as participants in the Mnet survival show Boys II Planet. Hyeop was eliminated after receiving a "No Star" in the Signal Song Test, and Dongyun was eliminated in the 2nd Elimination Round ranking 43rd.

== Members ==
Adapted from the official website:

=== Current ===
- Yunseong (윤성) – leader, vocalist, dancer
- Hyeop (협) – vocalist
- Changuk (창욱) – vocalist
- Dongyun (동윤) – rapper
- Minseo (민서) – vocalist
- Junho (준호) – vocalist

=== Former ===
- Alex (알렉스) – vocalist, rapper

== Discography ==
=== Studio albums ===
Title	Details	Peak chart positions	Sales
Title	Details	KOR	Sales
Villain: The End	Released: November 15, 2022; Label: Woollim Entertainment; Formats: CD, digital download, streaming; Track listing: 1. "I.N.O"; 2. "The One"; 3. "Silence"; 4. "Monster"; 5. "Home"; 6. "Utopia"; 7. "Deja Vu"; 8. "Escape"; 9. "Champion"; 10. "When I'm with You"	17	KOR: 40,675

=== Extended plays ===
Title	Details	Peak chart positions			Sales
Title	Details	KOR	JPN	JPN Hot	Sales
Boyager	Released: October 28, 2020; Label: Woollim Entertainment; Formats: CD, digital download, streaming; Track listing: 1. "Boyager"; 2. "Nostalgia"; 3. "Overdrive"; 4. "Shine"; 5. "Colors" (물들여); 6. "Light" (빛)	8	17	—	KOR: 52,832; JPN: 3,330
A Better Tomorrow	Released: March 16, 2021; Label: Woollim Entertainment; Formats: CD, digital download, streaming; Track listing: 1. "A Better Tomorrow"; 2. "Young Blood"; 3. "Reach Out Your Hands" (손을 뻗어봐); 4. "Without U"; 5. "Firefly"; 6. "Fate"	8	—	73	KOR: 47,597
Villain	Released: January 17, 2022; Label: Woollim Entertainment; Formats: CD, digital download, streaming; Track listing: 1. "7Villaz"; 2. "Villain"; 3. "Switch"; 4. "Shy"; 5. "Delusion"; 6. "Remember"; 7. "Vertigo" (CD only)	10	—	—	KOR: 33,699
"—" denotes a recording that did not chart or was not released in that territory

=== Single albums ===
Title	Details	Peak chart positions		Sales
Title	Details	KOR	JPN	Sales
Free Pass	Released: June 29, 2021; Label: Woollim Entertainment; Formats: CD, digital download, streaming; Track listing: 1. "Free Pass"; 2. "Stay"; 3. "Wish" (너의 소원 안에 내가 있었으면 해)	6	50	KOR: 37,596; JPN: 1,125
Villain: Zero	Released: June 15, 2022; Label: Woollim Entertainment; Formats: CD, digital download, streaming; Track listing: 1. "Zero"; 2. "Game"; 3. "Trick and Treat"	11	—	KOR: 28,023
Seven Sins	Released: April 19, 2023; Label: Woollim Entertainment; Formats: CD, digital download, streaming; Track listing: 1. "Seven Sins"; 2. "Stereo"; 3. "Bad Blood"	16	—	KOR: 64,676
Beautiful Maze	Released: April 3, 2024; Label: Woollim Entertainment; Formats: CD, digital download, streaming; Track listing: 1. "Beautiful Maze"; 2. "Get Loud"; 3. "Black Mirror"	30	—	KOR: 28,121
Weekend	Released: August 19, 2024; Label: Woollim Entertainment; Formats: CD, digital download, streaming; Track listing: 1. "Weekend"; 2. "Fly High"; 3. "Time"	5	—	KOR: 65,952
"—" denotes a recording that did not chart or was not released in that territory

=== Singles ===
==== Korean singles ====
Title	Year	Peak position		Album
Title	Year	KOR DL	US World	Album
"Nostalgia"	2020	89	—	Boyager
"Young Blood"	2021	46	—	A Better Tomorrow
"Free Pass"	2021	86	9	Free Pass
"Vertigo" (Note: "Vertigo" was released as a promotional single in collaboration with Universe.)	2021	—	—	Non-album single
"Villain"	2022	61	—	Villain
"Zero"	2022	49	—	Villain: Zero
"The One"	2022	57	—	Villain: The End
"Seven Sins"	2023	116	—	Seven Sins
"Beautiful Maze"	2024	66	—	Beautiful Maze
"Weekend"	2024	74	—	Weekend
"—" denotes a recording that did not chart or was not released in that territory.

==== Japanese singles ====
Title	Year	Peak position	Sales	Album
Title	Year	JPN	Sales	Album
"So Good"	2022	9	JPN: 6,373	Non-album singles
"Hello Goodbye"	2023	12	JPN: 10,508	Non-album singles

== Videography ==
=== Music videos ===
Title	Year	Director(s)	Ref.
Korean
"Nostalgia"	2020	Roh Ji-hoon (Studio Sapiens)	
"Shine"	2020	Roh Ji-hoon (Studio Sapiens)	
"Young Blood"	2021	Roh Ji-hoon (Studio Sapiens)	
"Free Pass"	2021	Zanybros	
"Vertigo"	2021	Shin Hee-won (ST-WT)	
"Villain"	2022	Kim Ja-kyoung (Flexible Pictures)	
"Zero"	2022	Kim Ja-kyoung (Flexible Pictures)	
"The One"	2022	Kim Ja-kyoung (Flexible Pictures)	
"Seven Sins"	2023	Paradox Child	
"Beautiful Maze"	2024	Paradox Child	
Japanese
"So Good"	2022	Jimmy (VIA)	
"Hello Goodbye"	2023	Unknown	

== Filmography ==
=== Reality shows ===
Year	Title	Note(s)	Ref.
2020	We are DRIPPIN	Premiered on September 17, 2020	
2020	GAME KING	November 25, 2020	
2021	LET'S DRIPPIN	Premiered on May 7, 2021	

=== Variety shows ===
Year	Title	Note(s)	Ref.
2021	"The Wolf: The Last Descendant"	Premiered on October 25, 2021	

== Awards and nominations ==
Name of the award ceremony, year presented, award category, nominee(s) of the award, and the result of the nomination
Award ceremony	Year	Category	Nominee(s)/work(s)	Result	Ref.
Asia Artist Awards	2021	Male Idol Group Popularity Award	Drippin	Nominated	
Asia Artist Awards	2021	U+ Idol Live Popularity Award	Drippin	Nominated	
Asia Artist Awards	2022	DCM Popularity Award – Singer	Drippin	Nominated	
Asia Artist Awards	2022	IdolPlus Popularity Award – Singer	Drippin	Nominated	
Asian Pop Music Awards (Note: Hosted by the Hong Kong Asia Pacific International Group and Sunway Records, the Asian Pop Music Awards bases its winners on "Asian Pop Music Chart" which opened in September 2019.)	2021	Best New Artist (Overseas)	A Better Tomorrow	Nominated	
Brand Customer Loyalty Awards	2021	Best Male Rookie Award	Drippin	Nominated	
Brand of the Year Awards	2021	Rookie Male Idol Award	Drippin	Nominated	
Circle Chart Music Awards	2021	New Artist of the Year - Physical	Boyager	Nominated	
Circle Chart Music Awards	2022	MuBeat Global Choice Award – Male Group	Drippin	Nominated	
Circle Chart Music Awards	2023	MuBeat Global Choice Award – Male Group	Drippin	Nominated	
Golden Disc Awards	2021	Rookie Artist of the Year	Drippin	Nominated	
Mnet Asian Music Awards	2021	Best New Male Artist	Drippin	Nominated	
Mnet Asian Music Awards	2021	Artist of the Year	Drippin	Longlisted	
Mnet Asian Music Awards	2021	Album of the Year	A Better Tomorrow	Longlisted	
Seoul Music Awards	2021	Rookie of the Year	Drippin	Nominated	
Seoul Music Awards	2021	K-wave Popularity Award	Drippin	Nominated	
Seoul Music Awards	2021	Popularity Award	Drippin	Nominated	
The Fact Music Awards	2021	Fan N Star Choice Award (Artist)	Drippin	Nominated	
