= E'Last =

South Korean boy band (2020–2026)

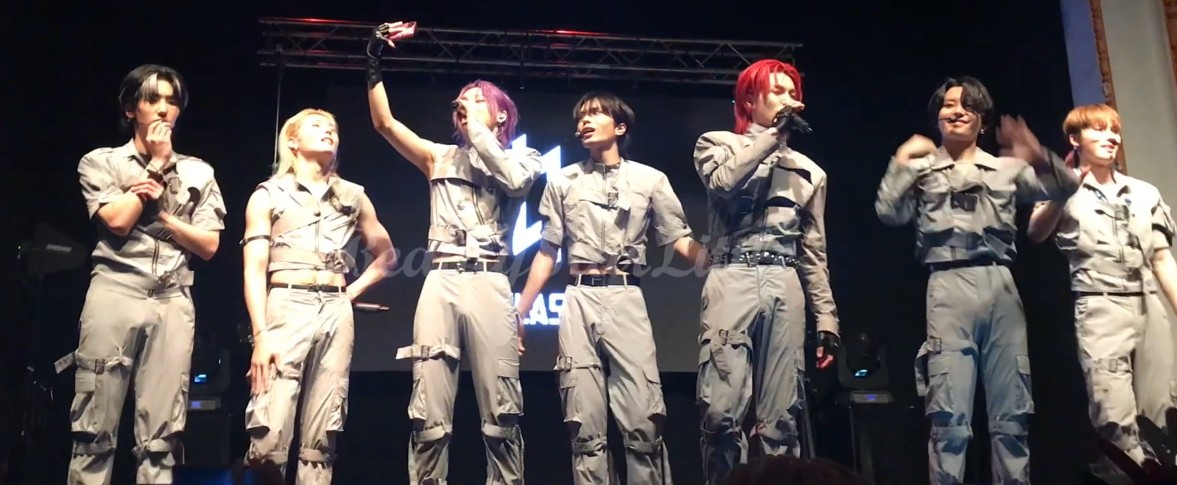
- E'Last performing in 2022

Background information
- Also known as: EBoyz
- Origin: Seoul, South Korea
- Genres: K-pop
- Years active: 2020–2026
- Label: E Entertainment
- Spinoffs: E'LAST U
- Past members: Seungyeop; Rano; Choi In; Baekgyeul; Romin; Won Hyuk; Wonjun; Yejun
- Website: eent.co.kr/musician

E'Last (Korean: 엘라스트, pronounced "El-Last" and commonly stylized as E'LAST), previously known as EBoyz (이보이즈), was a South Korean boy band formed by E Entertainment. The group was composed of seven members: Rano, Choi In, Baekgyeul, Romin, Won Hyuk, Wonjun, and Yejun. Originally an octet, Seungyeop left the group on June 22, 2025. They debuted on June 9, 2020, with their first mini album Day Dream. The group disbanded on the August 31, 2026.

== History ==
E'Last was the first group of E Entertainment. Their name is an abbreviation of "Everlasting", which either means "Eternity" and "Infinity. Won Hyuk and Wonjun were contestants on Produce X 101 and were the first two to be introduced into the EBoyz group. They were joined during summer 2019 by Choi In, Rano, and Seungyeop.

The members released their own reality show, named Unlock, prior to their debut. The official YouTube channel of the group uploaded an episode every Friday, showcasing the boys' daily lives and debut preparations.

The group debuted on June 9, 2020, with their first extended play Day Dream, featuring the lead single "Swear". On their debut album, the members said in an interview that Rano, Baekgyeul, Won Hyuk, and Wonjun participated in writing and composing songs.

The group returned with their second extended play Awake and its lead single "Tears of Chaos" on November 11, 2020. Wonjun was not involved in the comeback due to scheduling conflicts, as he was the host of EBS show Boni Hani.

In April 2021, it was announced that members Choi In, Seungyeop, Romin, and Wonjun would form the new sub-unit E'Last U. The sub-unit released their debut digital single "Remember" on May 19, 2021.

On September 29, 2021, the group released their first single album Dark Dream and its lead single of the same name.

On April 27, 2022, the group released their third extended play Roar and its lead single "Creature".

On January 3, 2023, the agency confirmed that Seungyeop would enter the military mandatory military service on January 31 at the 28th Infantry Division Military Enlistment Training Center.

On February 20, 2023, the group came back with their first digital single Thrill. Seungyeop was not involved in the comeback.

On September 29, 2023, the agency announced that Choi In would be taking a hiatus for personal reasons.

On October 17, 2023, the group came back with their fourth mini album iDENTIFICATION and its lead single of "Kiss me baby".

On January 5, 2024, member Baekgyeul was put on a hiatus citing health reasons.

The group released their first full-length album EVERLASTING and its title track "Gasoline" on May 2, 2024.

On August 6, 2024, the official account of the Japanese survival show Re:Born announced that E'LAST would be participating in the show, which aired on ABEMA from September 27, 2024, to November 29, 2024, and consisted of 10 episodes and 1 special episode. The group placed second.

On August 19, 2024, the agency announced that Choi In would enter the military mandatory military service on September 2.

On May 7, 2025, the group came back with their fifth mini album Versus and its lead single "Crazy Train".

On June 22, Seungyeop announced during an Instagram livestream that he had left the group due to his contract with E Entertainment concluding.

On August 31, 2026, E Entertainment announced the disbandment of E'last with all members having terminated their contracts.

== Members ==
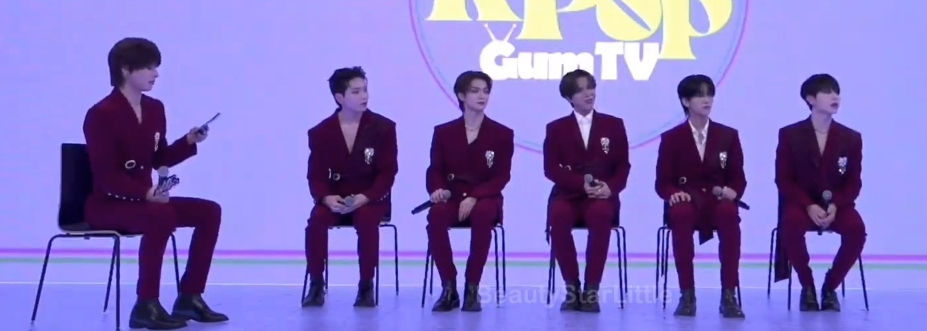
E'Last in January 2024 (members Choi in and Seungyeop were on hiatus)

=== Former ===
- Rano (라노) – leader, main dancer, lead rapper
- Choi In (최인) – lead dancer, sub-vocal
- Baekgyeul (백결) – lead vocalist
- Romin (로민) – sub vocal, sub rapper
- Won Hyuk (원혁) – main vocalist, lead rapper
- Wonjun (원준) – main rapper. sub vocal
- Yejun (예준) – sub vocal
- Seungyeop (승엽) – lead vocalist

== Discography ==
=== Studio albums ===
| Title | Details | Peak chart positions | Sales |
| Title | Details | KOR | Sales |
|---|---|---|---|
| Everlasting | Released: May 2, 2024; Label: E Entertainment; Formats: CD, digital download | 15 | KOR: 29,705 |

=== Extended plays ===
| Title | Details | Peak chart positions | Sales |
| Title | Details | KOR | Sales |
|---|---|---|---|
| Day Dream | Released: June 9, 2020; Label: E Entertainment; Formats: CD, digital download; Track listing: 1. "Intro."; 2. "Swear" (기사의 맹세); 3. "Sunrise"; 4. "My Flower" (나의 꽃); 5. "Light" (빛) | 27 | KOR: 7,270 |
| Awake | Released: November 11, 2020; Label: E Entertainment; Formats: CD, digital download; Track listing: 1. "Intro."; 2. "Tears of Chaos" (눈물자국); 3. "Dangerous"; 4. "Present"; 5. "Because of You" | 34 | KOR: 8,625 |
| Roar | Released: April 27, 2022; Label: E Entertainment; Formats: CD, digital download; Track listing: 1. "Intro"; 2. "Creature"; 3. "Poison" (Red ver.); 4. "Desire"; 5. "Shelter"; 6. "Let Me Free" (놓아줘); 7. "Nightmare" (각인) (Grey ver.) | 8 (Gray ver.); 9 (Red ver.) | KOR: 60,000 |
| Identification | Released: October 17, 2023; Label: E Entertainment; Formats: CD, digital download; Track listing: 1. "Kiss Me Baby"; 2. "Neverland"; 3. "Together"; 4. "Rain"; 5. "Thrill"; 6. "Thrill" (Japanese version) | — | |
| Versus | Released: May 7, 2025; Label: E Entertainment; Formats: CD, digital download; Track listing: 1. "Crazy Train"; 2. "Gotham"; 3. "Emergency"; 4. "Drive"; 5. "Misery" | 4 | KOR: 25,853 |

=== Single albums ===
| Title | Details | Peak chart positions | Sales |
| Title | Details | KOR | Sales |
|---|---|---|---|
| Dark Dream | Released: September 29, 2021; Label: E Entertainment; Formats: CD, digital download; Track listing: 1. "Dark Dream" (악연); 2. "Muse"; 3. "To.Lie"; 4. "Dark Dream" (악연) (Inst.) | 8 | KOR: 22,130 |

=== Singles ===
| Title | Year | Peak chart positions | Album |
| Title | Year | US World | Album |
|---|---|---|---|
| "Swear" (기사의 맹세) | 2020 | — | Day Dream |
| "Tears of Chaos" (눈물자국) | 2020 | — | Awake |
| "Dangerous" | 2021 | — | Awake |
| "Dark Dream" (악연) | 2021 | 4 | Dark Dream |
| "To.Lie" | 2021 | — | Dark Dream |
| "Creature" | 2022 | 8 | Roar |
| "Thrill" | 2023 | — | Non-album single |
| "Kiss Me Baby" | 2023 | — | Identification |
| "Gasoline" | 2024 | — | Everlasting |
| "Crazy Train" | 2025 | 8 | Versus |
| "Tame" | 2026 | — | Non-album single |
E'LAST U (sub-unit)
| "The Beginning Of Spring (봄의 시작) | 2021 | — | Remember |

== Videography ==
=== Music videos ===
| Year | Title | Director | Ref. |
|---|---|---|---|
| 2020 | "Swear" (기사의 맹세) | Kinotaku | |
| 2020 | "Tears of Chaos" (눈물자국) | Kinotaku | |
| 2021 | "Dangerous" | Kinotaku | |
| 2021 | "Dark Dream" (안연) | Kinotaku | |
| 2022 | "Creature" | Jin Hyun Heo (Zanybros) | |
| 2023 | "Thrill" | | |
