= Starlight Boys =

South Korean and Chinese survival show

- Official poster
- Starring: Lee Sung Kyoung; Lee Seung Gi; Daesung; Choi Youngjoon; Hanhae; Kwon Eun Bi; Hui; Eric; Yoon

Release
- Original network: iQIYI
- Original release: October 26 – December 28, 2024

Starlight Boys (Korean: 스타라이트보이즈; Chinese: 星光闪耀的少年), previously known as Youth With You International, is a South Korean-Chinese survival show that premiered on iQIYI and SBS on October 26, 2024.

The program follows the story of 69 contestants who will participate to debut in a 9-member boy group.

== Mentors ==
The series was presented by Lee Sung Kyoung. Other artists featured as cast members:

- Lee Seung Gi
- Daesung
- Choi Youngjoon
- Hanhae
- Kwon Eun Bi
- Hui
- Eric
- Yoon

== Contestants ==
Color key

- Top 9 of the week
- Final members of Polarix
- Eliminated in the Final Episode
- Eliminated in the Second Elimination
- Eliminated in the First Elimination
- Eliminated after the Signal Song Mission
- Left the show

Company	Name	Nationality	Age	Guiders' evaluation				Rankings										
Company	Name	Nationality	Age	Ep. 1–2 (Note: Level Test.)		Re-test (Note: Signal Song Survival Challenge.)		Ep. 2 (Note: As of October 31, 2024, at 21:00 KST.)	Ep. 3 (Note: As of November 7, 2024, at 21:00 KST.)	Ep. 5		Ep. 6 (Note: As of November 28, 2024, at 21:00 KST.)	Ep. 7 (Note: As of December 5, 2024, at 21:00 KST.)	Ep. 9		Ep. 10		Final
Company	Name	Nationality	Age	#	1st	#	2nd	#	#	#	Votes	#	#	#	Votes	#	Votes	Final
Top Class Entertainment (托璞司娱乐)	Bian Shiyu (비엔쓰위) (Note: Bian Shiyu is a member of trainee group TOPTEENS.)	China	18	47	1/3 stars	46	0/3 stars	35	39	Not Shown		Eliminated						
Ningbo Huajieyu Film and Television Culture Media Co., Ltd	Cai Chengyuan (카이청위안)	China	23	57	1/3 stars	52	0/3 stars	27	42	Not Shown		Eliminated						
Yue Kai Entertainment	Chen Xuanyou (천쉬안유)	China	19	14	2/3 stars	20	2/3 stars	26	30	32	168,328	34	32	Not Shown		Eliminated		
Individual Trainees (개인 연습생)	Choi Jun-ho (최준호) (Note: Choi Jun-ho was a contestant on Vocal Showdown.)	South Korea	22	31	1/3 stars	32	1/3 stars	28	36	37	129,344	Eliminated						
Mustation Entertainment	CongB (콩비) (Note: CongB and Lee Daeul were contestants on Boys Planet.)	Vietnam	23	10	2/3 stars	27	1/3 stars	12	11	13	539,466	17	13	13	833,340	Not Shown		Eliminated
PocketDol Studio (포켓돌스튜디오)	Do-ha (규민) (Note: Do-ha, Han-gyul, Min-jae, and Yoo-jun are members of BAE173 and as a group they were contestants in Peak Time.) (Note: Do-ha and Park Si-woo were contestants on Extreme Debut: Wild Idol.)	South Korea	20	43	2/3 stars	13	2/3 stars	11	16	22	354,888	21	22	15	781,206	Not Shown		Eliminated
M-Nation	Duan Xingxing (두안싱싱) (Note: Duan Xingxing, Sun Yinghao, and Yoo Gwan-woo are former members of IXForm and were contestants on Youth With You 3.)	China	26	4	3/3 stars	8	3/3 stars	6	6	6	1,054,784	8	9	8	1,070,680	11	Not Shown	Eliminated
FirstOne Entertainment (퍼스트원)	Eden (이든) (Note: Eden is a member of NINE.i.)	South Korea	26	44	1/3 stars	30	1/3 stars	29	37	36	132,442	27	26	17	597,296	Not Shown		Eliminated
Stardust Entertainment (砾子星尘文化传媒有限公司)	Float (플로트) (Note: Float and He Xilong are members of trainee group Stardust Boys.) (Note: Float is a former member of Hashtax.)	Thailand	21	62	1/3 stars	Not Shown		Eliminated										
Individual Trainees (개인 연습생)	Gun-woo (건우) (Note: Gun-woo is a former member of TFN.)	South Korea	22	41	1/3 stars	38	1/3 stars	42	45	38	Not Shown	Eliminated						
PocketDol Studio (포켓돌스튜디오)	Hangyul (한결) (Note: Han-gyul is a former member of H&D.) (Note: Han-gyul is a former member of X1.) (Note: Han-gyul, Lee Jun-hyuk, and Park Si-woo were contestants on Produce X 101.) (Note: Han-gyul was a contestant on The Unit: Idol Rebooting Project.)	South Korea	24	50	2/3 stars	35	1/3 stars	4	4	4	1,467,622	4	3	2	2,989,467	6	676,040	6
Individual Trainees (개인 연습생)	Han Jeong-woo (한정우) (Note: Han Jeong-woo is a former member of trainee group Odd One Out.)	South Korea	23	13	2/3 stars	6	3/3 stars	15	17	21	360,664	19	23	Not Shown		Eliminated		
Individual Trainees (개인 연습생)	Han Tae-i (한태이)	South Korea	20	53	1/3 stars	48	0/3 stars	55	54	Not Shown		Eliminated						
Stardust Entertainment (砾子星尘文化传媒有限公司)	He Xilong (허시롱)	China	24	28	2/3 stars	22	2/3 stars	9	10	11	609,883	18	11	11	863,604	Not Shown		Eliminated
Individual Trainees (개인 연습생)	Hijiri (히지리) (Note: Hijiri is a member of Berave.)	Japan	21	7	1/3 stars	36	1/3 stars	54	53	Not Shown		Eliminated						
KISS Entertainment (キッス・エンタテインメント)	Hikari (히카리) (Note: Hikari, Hong Sung-min, and Linq Qi are members of Fantasy Boys.)	Japan	22	45	2/3 stars	14	2/3 stars	23	26	26	271,049	14	20	19	522,104	Eliminated		
Individual Trainees (개인 연습생)	Hoang Phan (호앙판) (Note: Hoang Phan and Wang Kun were contestants on Asia Super Young.)	Vietnam	23	55	1/3 stars	Not Shown		Eliminated										
PocketDol Studio (포켓돌스튜디오)	Hong Sung-min (홍성민) (Note: Hikari, Hong Sung-min, Jae-min, and Linq Qi were contestants on Fantasy Boys.)	South Korea	20	23	2/3 stars	3	3/3 stars	18	12	12	593,570	11	10	7	1,080,796	12	Not Shown	Eliminated
JS Entertainment (제이에스엔터테인먼트)	Hou Jiaen (허우지아언)	China	19	58	0/3 stars	Not Shown		Eliminated										
Qin's Entertainment (坤音娱乐)	Huang Jialiang (후앙지아량) (Note: Huang Jialiang is a member of BC221.)	China	20	38	2/3 stars	21	2/3 stars	45	41	Not Shown		Eliminated						
JS Entertainment (제이에스엔터테인먼트)	Huang Pengfeng (후앙펑펑)	China	18	66	0/3 stars	Not Shown		Eliminated										
Yuxiao Media	Ivan (아이반) (Note: Ivan is a member of Cheng Xin Ji Hua.)	Malaysia	23	22	2/3 stars	54	0/3 stars	22	23	24	313,213	23	24	Not Shown		Eliminated		
Individual Trainees (개인 연습생)	Jae-min (재민)	South Korea	21	56	1/3 stars	53	0/3 stars	44	46	Not Shown		Eliminated						
Individual Trainees (개인 연습생)	Jeon Min-gyu (전민규)	South Korea	18	69	0/3 stars	51	0/3 stars	53	55	Not Shown		Eliminated						
Individual Trainees (개인 연습생)	Jung Hae-sung (정해성)	South Korea	22	49	1/3 stars	28	1/3 stars	46	48	Not Shown		Eliminated						
RS Music (개인 연습생)	Kad (카드) (Note: Kad is a former member of Superboy.) (Note: Kad is a former member of F2K.) (Note: Kad is a former member of Element.)	Thailand	26	24	1/3 stars	Not Shown		Eliminated										
Individual Trainees (개인 연습생)	Kwak Gun (곽건) (Note: Kawk Gun is a former member of 14U.)	South Korea	23	37	2/3 stars	19	2/3 stars	52	51	Not Shown		Eliminated						
TOV Entertainment (엔터테인먼트)	Ke Mingkai (크어밍카이) (Note: Ke Mingkai, Li Shengjun, and Sheng Qi are members of Youtove.)	China	23	35	0/3 stars	45	0/3 stars	41	29	29	239,188	36	36	Not Shown		Eliminated		
Individual Trainees (개인 연습생)	Kim Seon-jae (김선재)	South Korea	21	36	2/3 stars	31	1/3 stars	38	44	Not Shown		Eliminated						
KPlus (케이플러스)	Kim Seong-ju (김성주)	South Korea	17	21	1/3 stars	49	0/3 stars	36	40	Not Shown		Eliminated						
Individual Trainees (개인 연습생)	Kingston Wong (킹스톤웡) (Note: Kingston Wong was a contestant on King Maker V.)	Malaysia	19	16	2/3 stars	29	1/3 stars	34	32	33	158,417	30	29	Not Shown		Eliminated		
Individual Trainees (개인 연습생)	Kris (크리스) (Note: Kris was a contestant on To Be Number One Idol 11.) (Note: Kris was a contestant on 9low on top.)	Thailand	21	27	2/3 stars	16	2/3 stars	24	28	34	152,399	32	34	Not Shown		Eliminated		
Individual Trainees (개인 연습생)	Lee Da-eul (이다을)	South Korea	20	46	1/3 stars	56	0/3 stars	8	8	10	646,101	20	18	14	793,180	9	277,835	9
Individual Trainees (개인 연습생)	Lee Jun-hyuk (이준혁) (Note: Lee Jun-hyuk is a former member of Mirae.)	South Korea	24	5	2/3 stars	23	2/3 stars	7	7	7	946,089	7	6	3	1,737,708	2	1,532,218	2
TOV Entertainment (엔터테인먼트)	Li Shengjun (리성준)	China	21	59	0/3 stars	Not Shown		Eliminated										
PocketDol Studio (포켓돌스튜디오)	Ling Qi (링치) (Note: Ling Qi is a member of co-ed group A Six.) (Note: Ling Qi was a contestant on Idol Producer.) (Note: Ling Qi is a former member of X-Time.)	China	22	15	2/3 stars	15	2/3 stars	17	19	18	382,484	24	19	18	578,255	Not Shown		Eliminated
The Line Star Entertainment	Luo Junwei (루어쥔웨이) (Note: Luo Junwei was a contestant on The Coming One 2.)	China	22	48	1/3 stars	40	1/3 stars	51	52	Not Shown		Eliminated						
Individual Trainees (개인 연습생)	Michael Wu (마이클우)	Canada	21	18	3/3 stars	7	3/3 stars	48	35	31	197,085	10	21	Not Shown		Eliminated		
PocketDol Studio (포켓돌스튜디오)	Min-jae (민재)	South Korea	20	40	2/3 stars	9	3/3 stars	10	9	9	650,397	13	16	16	639,556	Not Shown		Eliminated
TNK Entertainment (TNK 엔터테인먼트)	Nam Son (남손) (Note: Nam Son is a member of PICKUS.) (Note: Nam Son and Xu Shihuan were contestants on Fan Pick.)	Vietnam	17	54	2/3 stars	41	1/3 stars	40	31	28	249,662	28	25	Not Shown		Eliminated		
Individual Trainees (개인 연습생)	Ngan Chau Yuet (응안차우유엣)	Hong Kong	22	63	1/3 stars	Not Shown		Eliminated										
Insight Entertainment (อินไซท์ เอ็นเตอร์เทนเมนต์)	Park Si-woo (박시우) (Note: Park Si-woo is a former member of Blank2y.)	South Korea	23	51	1/3 stars	37	1/3 stars	47	49	Not Shown		Eliminated						
Individual Trainees (개인 연습생)	Park Yeon-wook (박연욱)	South Korea	22	68	1/3 stars	33	1/3 stars	56	56	Not Shown		Eliminated						
Insight Entertainment (อินไซท์ เอ็นเตอร์เทนเมนต์)	Pentor (펜떠) (Note: Pentor is a former member of LAZ1.) (Note: Pentor was a contestant of LAZ iCON.)	Thailand	25	2	3/3 stars	11	2/3 stars	5	5	5	1,269,590	6	8	4	1,307,081	5	693,895	5
Individual Trainees (개인 연습생)	Phoom (품)	Thailand	23	30	1/3 stars	44	0/3 stars	30	33	35	150,969	26	28	Not Shown		Eliminated		
Individual Trainees (개인 연습생)	Pong (퐁) (Note: Pong was a contestant on Oishi Teen Idol 2.)	Laos	22	39	2/3 stars	47	0/3 stars	37	34	30	216,669	33	33	Not Shown		Eliminated		
Individual Trainees (개인 연습생)	Rex (렉스)	China	26	12	0/3 stars	Not Shown		Eliminated										
Individual Trainees (개인 연습생)	Rin (린) (Note: Rin was a contestant on Loud.)	Japan	22	25	1/3 stars	34	1/3 stars	43	43	Not Shown		Eliminated						
Individual Trainees (개인 연습생)	Ryou Kaito (료카이토)	Japan	23	29	1/3 stars	Not Shown		Eliminated										
Warner Music China (华纳音乐中国)	Shao Ziheng (샤오쯔헝)	China	20	1	3/3 stars	2	3/3 stars	3	3	3	1,740,809	2	1	1	4,343,933	1	2,144,491	1
TOV Entertainment (엔터테인먼트)	Sheng Qi (셩치)	China	21	32	1/3 stars	5	3/3 stars	39	27	25	272,585	12	17	20	Not Shown	Eliminated		
JS Entertainment (제이에스엔터테인먼트)	Sun Jiayang (쑨지아양)	China	18	60	0/3 stars	25	2/3 stars	25	20	19	369,877	29	30	Not Shown		Eliminated		
Laoyu Vision Company	Sun Yinghao (쑨잉하오)	China	24	8	2/3 stars	12	2/3 stars	2	2	2	1,878,149	3	4	Left the show				
Individual Trainees (개인 연습생)	Syo (쇼)	Japan	24	26	0/3 stars	17	2/3 stars	19	24	27	263,620	31	31	Not Shown		Eliminated		
RS Music (개인 연습생)	Vexter (벡터)	Thailand	22	9	1/3 stars	Not Shown		Eliminated										
Joy Together	Wang Kun (왕쿤)	China	18	51	3/3 stars	4	3/3 stars	16	18	17	393,353	25	27	Not Shown		Eliminated		
UN24	Xin Che (신처)	China	18	33	1/3 stars	55	0/3 stars	20	25	23	333,712	22	12	9	954,638	4	882,415	4
Individual Trainees (개인 연습생)	Xu Shihuan (허세환)	China	24	42	1/3 stars	39	1/3 stars	31	14	14	482,842	35	35	6	1,082,589	3	1,431,896	3
Bluedot Entertainment (블루닷 엔터테인먼트)	Yang Dong-hwa (양동화) (Note: Yang Dong-hwa was a contestant of The Origin – A, B, Or What?.)	South Korea	21	6	3/3 stars	10	2/3 stars	32	22	16	404,184	9	7	5	1,284,062	8	415,097	8
Insight Entertainment (อินไซท์ เอ็นเตอร์เทนเมนต์)	Yang Yan (양얜)	Singapore	23	17	0/3 stars	50	0/3 stars	49	47	Not Shown		Eliminated						
Image Music	Yoo Gwan-woo (유관우)	Taiwan	22	11	3/3 stars	1	3/3 stars	1	1	1	2,628,744	1	2	Left the show				
PocketDol Studio (포켓돌스튜디오)	Yoo-jun (유준)	South Korea	23	19	2/3 stars	26	1/3 stars	13	15	15	453,145	15	14	12	860,647	10	247,729	Eliminated
Individual Trainees (개인 연습생)	Yoshi (요시)	Japan	18	20	1/3 stars	18	2/3 stars	50	50	Not Shown		Eliminated						
Catwalk (凯渥经纪)	Zai (자이)	Taiwan	20	3	3/3 stars	24	2/3 stars	21	21	20	361,305	16	15	10	914,418	7	562,335	7
JS Entertainment (제이에스엔터테인먼트)	Zhang Hangyi (장항이)	China	19	67	0/3 stars	Not Shown		Eliminated										
PC Entertainment	Zhang Jijun (장지쥔) (Note: Zhang Jijun is a member of AGEBOY.)	China	24	34	0/3 stars	43	0/3 stars	14	13	8	688,940	5	5	Left the show				
Individual Trainees (개인 연습생)	Zhang Jinghe (장징허)	China	20	65	0/3 stars	42	0/3 stars	33	38	Not Shown		Eliminated						
Individual Trainees (개인 연습생)	Zhao Jiayin (자오지아인)	China	21	52	0/3 stars	Left the show												
JS Entertainment (제이에스엔터테인먼트)	Zhu Enhao (주언하오)	China	17	64	0/3 stars	Not Shown		Eliminated										

=== Prior to Starlight Boys ===
Prior to Starlight Boys

== Missions ==
=== Level Test (Episode 1–2) ===
Key

All star	3/3 stars
2 star	2/3 stars
1 star	1/3 stars
0 star	0/3 stars

Color key

- Polaris
- "All-star" contestant who was eventually demoted to "2-star"

The Level Test involves the contestants performing individually or in teams and getting their individual performance evaluated by the guiders. After each performance, contestants could also evaluate each others' performances by voting. At the end of the Level Test, the contestant with the most votes, regardless of their grade, will be the "all-star" center, dubbed Polaris.

Bold team numbers are teams whose performances were partially or entirely unaired on broadcast. (Note: Full versions of the unaired performances were posted to YouTube by iQIYI on October 28 (Episode 1) and November 4, 2024 (Episode 2).)

Star Level Test (1st evaluation results)
Performance			Team	Contestant	Evaluation	Performance			Team	Contestant	Evaluation
#	Original artist(s)	Song	Team	Contestant	Evaluation	#	Original artist(s)	Song	Team	Contestant	Evaluation
Episode 1						Episode 2					
1	BTS	"Blood Sweat & Tears"	BTS	Ke Mingkai	0/3 stars	14	Got7	"Hard Carry"	Avengers (어벤져스)	Chen Xuanyou	2/3 stars
1	BTS	"Blood Sweat & Tears"	BTS	Li Shengjun	0/3 stars	14	Got7	"Hard Carry"	Avengers (어벤져스)	Huang Jialiang	3/3 stars
1	BTS	"Blood Sweat & Tears"	BTS	Sheng Qi	1/3 stars	14	Got7	"Hard Carry"	Avengers (어벤져스)	Ivan	2/3 stars
2	AB6IX	"Breathe"	ABMIX	Ryou Kaito	1/3 stars	14	Got7	"Hard Carry"	Avengers (어벤져스)	Michael Wu	3/3 stars
2	AB6IX	"Breathe"	ABMIX	Syo	0/3 stars	14	Got7	"Hard Carry"	Avengers (어벤져스)	Zai	3/3 stars
3	Treasure	"Darari"	Runway My Way	Kim Seong-ju	1/3 stars	15	TVXQ	"Hug"	AI Visuals (AI 비주얼)	Xin Che	1/3 stars
4	Ateez	"Crazy Form"	Triple Casting (트리플 캐스팅)	Choi Jun-ho	1/3 stars	16	Treasure	"Jikjin"	Fantasy Boys (판타지 보이즈)	Hikari	2/3 stars
4	Ateez	"Crazy Form"	Triple Casting (트리플 캐스팅)	Han Jeong-woo	3/3 stars	16	Treasure	"Jikjin"	Fantasy Boys (판타지 보이즈)	Hong Sung-min	3/3 stars
4	Ateez	"Crazy Form"	Triple Casting (트리플 캐스팅)	Kim Seon-jae	2/3 stars	16	Treasure	"Jikjin"	Fantasy Boys (판타지 보이즈)	Ling Qi	2/3 stars
5	Super Junior	"Black Suit"	Black Suit	Shao Ziheng	3/3 stars	17	Chungha	"Gotta Go"	Unknown	Phoom	1/3 stars
6	Beast	"Beautiful"	Super MZ	Hou Jiaen	0/3 stars	18	Infinite	"Man In Love"	Unknown	Eden	1/3 stars
6	Beast	"Beautiful"	Super MZ	Huang Pengfeng	0/3 stars	18	Infinite	"Man In Love"	Unknown	Gun-woo	1/3 stars
6	Beast	"Beautiful"	Super MZ	Sun Jiayang	0/3 stars	18	Infinite	"Man In Love"	Unknown	Han Tae-i	1/3 stars
6	Beast	"Beautiful"	Super MZ	Zhang Hangyi	0/3 stars	19	Stray Kids	"Case 143"	Unknown	Hijiri	1/3 stars
6	Beast	"Beautiful"	Super MZ	Zhu Enhao	0/3 stars	19	Stray Kids	"Case 143"	Unknown	Rin	1/3 stars
7	2PM	"My House"	Before Anyone Else	Do-ha	2/3 stars	19	Stray Kids	"Case 143"	Unknown	Yoshi	1/3 stars
7	2PM	"My House"	Before Anyone Else	Han-gyul	3/3 stars	20	ONF	"Bye My Monster"	Unknown	Jae-min	1/3 stars
7	2PM	"My House"	Before Anyone Else	Min-jae	3/3 stars	20	ONF	"Bye My Monster"	Unknown	Jung Hae-sung	1/3 stars
7	2PM	"My House"	Before Anyone Else	Yoo-jun	2/3 stars	20	ONF	"Bye My Monster"	Unknown	Kawk Gun	2/3 stars
8	BigBang	"Fantastic Baby"	Star Kings (스타킹)	Rex	0/3 stars	21	Infinite	"Be Mine"	Unknown	Kad	1/3 stars
8	BigBang	"Fantastic Baby"	Star Kings (스타킹)	Yang Yan	0/3 stars	21	Infinite	"Be Mine"	Unknown	Vexter	1/3 stars
8	BigBang	"Fantastic Baby"	Star Kings (스타킹)	Zhang Jijun	0/3 stars	22	Stray Kids	"Miroh"	Unknown	Bian Shiyu	1/3 stars
9	Winner	"Really Really"	Flirty Boys (플러팅 보이즈)	Jeon Min-gyu	0/3 stars	22	Stray Kids	"Miroh"	Unknown	Hoang Phan	1/3 stars
9	Winner	"Really Really"	Flirty Boys (플러팅 보이즈)	Lee Da-eul	1/3 stars	22	Stray Kids	"Miroh"	Unknown	Luo Junwei	1/3 stars
9	Winner	"Really Really"	Flirty Boys (플러팅 보이즈)	Nam Son	2/3 stars	22	Stray Kids	"Miroh"	Unknown	Park Si-woo	1/3 stars
9	Winner	"Really Really"	Flirty Boys (플러팅 보이즈)	Park Yeon-wook	1/3 stars	23	Cravity	"Groovy"	Unknown	Cai Chengyuan	1/3 stars
10	Riize	"Love 119"	Shining Eyes	Float	1/3 stars	23	Cravity	"Groovy"	Unknown	Xu Shihuan	1/3 stars
10	Riize	"Love 119"	Shining Eyes	He Xilong	2/3 stars	23	Cravity	"Groovy"	Unknown	Zhao Jiayin	0/3 stars
10	Riize	"Love 119"	Shining Eyes	Ngan Chau Yuet	1/3 stars	24	BTS	"Boy In Luv"	Unknown	CongB	2/3 stars
10	Riize	"Love 119"	Shining Eyes	Wang Kun	3/3 stars	24	BTS	"Boy In Luv"	Unknown	Kingston Wong	2/3 stars
10	Riize	"Love 119"	Shining Eyes	Zhang Jinghe	0/3 stars	24	BTS	"Boy In Luv"	Unknown	Pong	2/3 stars
11	Monsta X	"Rush Hour"	Second Idol (두 번째 아이돌)	Lee Jun-hyuk	3/3 stars	25	Kai	"Mmmh"	All Rounder (올라운더)	Yang Dong-hwa	3/3 stars
12	SF9	"Good Guy"	N and S (N극과 S극)	Kris	2/3 stars						
12	SF9	"Good Guy"	N and S (N극과 S극)	Pentor	3/3 stars						
13	Ateez	"Answer"	Last Dance (라스트 댄스)	Duan Xingxing	3/3 stars						
13	Ateez	"Answer"	Last Dance (라스트 댄스)	Sun Yinghao	3/3 stars						
13	Ateez	"Answer"	Last Dance (라스트 댄스)	Yoo Gwan-woo	3/3 stars						

==== All-Star Battle ====
Only eight seats were allotted for contestants receiving an "all-star" rating. Once all seats were filled, subsequent contestants receiving an "all-star" could challenge a current "all-star" contestant for their seat. Results were determined by the other contestants' votes. The winning contestant would keep their "all-star" rating, while the losing contestant would be demoted to "2-star".

Color key

- Winning contestant, remained in all-star
- Losing contestant, demoted to 2-star

Order	Challenger	Nominee
1	Yoo Gwan-woo	Han Jeong-woo
2	Sun Yinghao	Min-jae
3	Michael Wu	Han-gyul
4	Huang Jialiang	Duan Xingxing
5	Zai	Lee Jun-hyuk
6	Hong Sung-min	Sun Yinghao
7	Yang Dong-hwa	Sun Yinghao

=== Signal Song Survival Challenge (Episode 2) ===
Key

Same position	Class maintained
▲	Class upgraded
▼	Class downgraded

The top row indicates the initial level assigned after the Level Placement Test, while the first column indicates the new level after the re-evaluation.

Re-evaluation Test (2nd evaluation results)
Before After	All star	2 star	1 star	0 star
All star	Duan Xingxing; Michael Wu; Shao Ziheng; Wang Kun; Yoo Gwan-woo	Han Jeong-woo ▲; Hong Sung-min ▲; Minjae ▲	Sheng Qi ▲	—N/a
2 star	Pentor ▼; Yang Dong-hwa ▼; Zai ▼	Chen Xuanyou; Do-ha; Kawk Gun; Kris; He Xilong; Hikari; Huang Jialiang; Lee Jun-hyuk; Ling Qi; Sun Yinghao	Yoshi ▲	Sun Jiayang ▲; Syo ▲
1 star	—N/a	CongB ▼; Han-gyul ▼; Kim Seon-jae ▼; Kingston Wong ▼; Nam Son ▼; Yoo-jun ▼	Choi Jun-ho; Eden; Gun-woo; Hijiri; Jung Hae-sung; Luo Junwei; Park Si-woo; Park Yeon-wook; Rin; Xu Shihuan	—N/a
0 star	—N/a	Ivan ▼; Pong ▼	Bian Shiyu ▼; Cai Chengyuan ▼; Han Tae-i ▼; Jae-min ▼; Kim Seong-ju ▼; Lee Da-eul ▼; Phoom ▼; Xin Che ▼	Jeon Min-gyu; Ke Mingkai; Yang Yan; Zhang Jijun; Zhang Jinghe
Eliminated	—N/a	—N/a	Float ▼; Hoang Phan ▼; Kad ▼; Ngan Chau Yuet ▼; Ryou Kaito ▼; Vexter ▼	Hou Jiaen ▼; Huang Pengfeng ▼; Li Shengjun ▼; Rex ▼; Zhang Hangyi ▼; Zhu Enhao ▼

=== K-Pop Generation Battle (Episode 3-4) ===
Color key

- Winning Team
- Polaris

K-Pop Generation Battle results
#	Performance			Contestant				
#	Original artist(s)	Song	Team Votes	Position	Name	Votes	Votes with bonus	Rank
1	Stray Kids	"Chk Chk Boom"	142	Main Vocal	Syo	20	5,020	26
1	Stray Kids	"Chk Chk Boom"	142	Sub Vocal 1	Kawk Gun	31	5,031	20
1	Stray Kids	"Chk Chk Boom"	142	Sub Vocal 2	Hikari	104	10,104	1
1	Stray Kids	"Chk Chk Boom"	142	Sub Vocal 3	Yoo-jun	103	5,103	2
1	Stray Kids	"Chk Chk Boom"	142	Sub Vocal 4	Yang Yan	27	5,027	22
1	Stray Kids	"Chk Chk Boom"	142	Sub Vocal 5	Michael Wu	47	5,047	17
1	Ateez	"Guerilla"	33	Main Vocal	Choi Jun-ho	44	—N/a	42
1	Ateez	"Guerilla"	33	Sub Vocal 1	Min-jae	61	—N/a	35
1	Ateez	"Guerilla"	33	Sub Vocal 2	Chen Xuanyou	22	—N/a	48
1	Ateez	"Guerilla"	33	Sub Vocal 3	Lee Da-eul	30	—N/a	45
1	Ateez	"Guerilla"	33	Sub Vocal 4	Han Jeong-woo	12	—N/a	54
1	Ateez	"Guerilla"	33	Sub Vocal 5	Lee Jun-hyuk	87	—N/a	31
2	BTS	"Butter"	83	Main Vocal	Sheng Qi	22	—N/a	48
2	BTS	"Butter"	83	Sub Vocal 1	Xu Shihuan	35	—N/a	43
2	BTS	"Butter"	83	Sub Vocal 2	Luo Junwei	34	—N/a	44
2	BTS	"Butter"	83	Sub Vocal 3	Cai Chengyuan	26	—N/a	46
2	BTS	"Butter"	83	Sub Vocal 4	Pentor	53	—N/a	38
2	BTS	"Butter"	83	Sub Vocal 5	Eden	77	—N/a	32
2	NCT Dream	"Glitch Mode"	84	Main Vocal	Hijiri	19	5,019	27
2	NCT Dream	"Glitch Mode"	84	Sub Vocal 1	Gun-woo	62	5,062	11
2	NCT Dream	"Glitch Mode"	84	Sub Vocal 2	Kim Seon-jae	26	5,026	23
2	NCT Dream	"Glitch Mode"	84	Sub Vocal 3	Kris	10	5,010	29
2	NCT Dream	"Glitch Mode"	84	Sub Vocal 4	Wang Kun	63	5,063	10
2	NCT Dream	"Glitch Mode"	84	Sub Vocal 5	Xin Che	56	5,056	13
3	Riize	"Boom Boom Bass"	80	Main Vocal	Yoo Gwan-woo	98	5,098	3
3	Riize	"Boom Boom Bass"	80	Sub Vocal 1	CongB	80	5,080	6
3	Riize	"Boom Boom Bass"	80	Sub Vocal 2	Duan Xingxing	52	5,052	15
3	Riize	"Boom Boom Bass"	80	Sub Vocal 3	Huang Jialiang	26	5,026	23
3	Riize	"Boom Boom Bass"	80	Sub Vocal 4	Sun Yinghao	60	5,060	12
3	Riize	"Boom Boom Bass"	80	Sub Vocal 5	Bian Shiyu	29	5,029	21
3	Babymonster	"Sheesh"	77	Main Vocal	Rin	73	—N/a	33
3	Babymonster	"Sheesh"	77	Sub Vocal 1	Ivan	21	—N/a	51
3	Babymonster	"Sheesh"	77	Sub Vocal 2	Kingston Wong	21	—N/a	51
3	Babymonster	"Sheesh"	77	Sub Vocal 3	Zhang Jijun	46	—N/a	41
3	Babymonster	"Sheesh"	77	Sub Vocal 4	Sun Jiayang	94	—N/a	30
4	Pentagon	"Shine"	27	Main Vocal	Park Yeon-wook	48	—N/a	39
4	Pentagon	"Shine"	27	Sub Vocal 1	Kim Seong-ju	12	—N/a	54
4	Pentagon	"Shine"	27	Sub Vocal 2	Jung Hae-sung	22	—N/a	48
4	Pentagon	"Shine"	27	Sub Vocal 3	Nam Son	9	—N/a	56
4	Pentagon	"Shine"	27	Sub Vocal 4	Zhang Jinghe	47	—N/a	40
4	Blackpink	"How You Like That"	141	Main Vocal	He Xilong	66	5,066	9
4	Blackpink	"How You Like That"	141	Sub Vocal 1	Yoshi	24	5,024	25
4	Blackpink	"How You Like That"	141	Sub Vocal 2	Ke Mingkai	17	5,017	28
4	Blackpink	"How You Like That"	141	Sub Vocal 3	Do-ha	78	5,078	7
4	Blackpink	"How You Like That"	141	Sub Vocal 4	Park Si-woo	40	5,040	18
5	Super Junior	"Sorry Sorry"	32	Main Vocal	Jae-min	56	—N/a	36
5	Super Junior	"Sorry Sorry"	32	Sub Vocal 1	Han Tae-i	67	—N/a	34
5	Super Junior	"Sorry Sorry"	32	Sub Vocal 2	Pong	14	—N/a	53
5	Super Junior	"Sorry Sorry"	32	Sub Vocal 3	Jeon Min-gyu	24	—N/a	47
5	Super Junior	"Sorry Sorry"	32	Sub Vocal 4	Phoom	56	—N/a	36
5	2PM	"Again & Again"	129	Main Vocal	Ling Qi	73	5,073	8
5	2PM	"Again & Again"	129	Sub Vocal 1	Zai	54	5,054	14
5	2PM	"Again & Again"	129	Sub Vocal 2	Yang Dong-hwa	39	5,039	19
5	2PM	"Again & Again"	129	Sub Vocal 3	Shao Ziheng	82	5,082	5
5	2PM	"Again & Again"	129	Sub Vocal 4	Hong Sung-min	48	5,048	16
5	2PM	"Again & Again"	129	Sub Vocal 5	Han-gyul	96	5,096	4

=== Position Battle (Episode 6-8) ===
Color key

- Winning Team
- Polaris

Position Battle results
Position	Performance			Contestant			
Position	Original artist(s)	Song	Position	Name	Votes	Votes with bonus	Rank
Vocal	BtoB	"Pray (I'll Be Your Man)"	Vocal 1	Min-jae	43	—N/a	31
Vocal	BtoB	"Pray (I'll Be Your Man)"	Vocal 2	Syo	39	—N/a	33
Vocal	BtoB	"Pray (I'll Be Your Man)"	Vocal 3	Hong Sungmin	61	—N/a	28
Vocal	BtoB	"Pray (I'll Be Your Man)"	Vocal 4	Shao Ziheng	107	100,107	4
Vocal	Day6	"You Were Beautiful"	Vocal 1	CongB	89	100,089	6
Vocal	Day6	"You Were Beautiful"	Vocal 2	Ivan	54	50,054	16
Vocal	Day6	"You Were Beautiful"	Vocal 3	Duan Xingxing	47	50,047	18
Vocal	Day6	"You Were Beautiful"	Vocal 4	Pentor	86	50,086	13
Dance	Stray Kids	"Thunderous"	Vocal 1	Chen Xuanyou	103	—N/a	20
Dance	Stray Kids	"Thunderous"	Vocal 2	Kingston Wong	33	—N/a	35
Dance	Stray Kids	"Thunderous"	Vocal 3	Sheng Qi	47	—N/a	29
Dance	Stray Kids	"Thunderous"	Vocal 4	Pong	22	—N/a	36
Dance	Stray Kids	"Thunderous"	Vocal 5	Han Jeong-woo	84	—N/a	22
Dance	The Boyz	"Maverick"	Vocal 1	Yoo-jun	105	200,105	3
Dance	The Boyz	"Maverick"	Vocal 2	Xu Shihuan	48	50,048	17
Dance	The Boyz	"Maverick"	Vocal 3	Lee Da-eul	41	50,041	19
Dance	The Boyz	"Maverick"	Vocal 4	Hikari	81	50,081	14
Dance	The Boyz	"Maverick"	Vocal 5	Sun Yinghao	79	50,079	15
Rap x Dance	NCT Dream	"Smoothie"	Polaris	Zai	103	400,103	2
Rap x Dance	NCT Dream	"Smoothie"	Vocal 1	Do-ha	91	100,091	5
Rap x Dance	NCT Dream	"Smoothie"	Vocal 2	Sun Jiayang	32	100,032	10
Rap x Dance	NCT Dream	"Smoothie"	Vocal 3	Kris	10	100,010	12
Rap x Dance	iKon	"Rhythm Ta"	Polaris	Phoom	73	—N/a	25
Rap x Dance	iKon	"Rhythm Ta"	Vocal 1	Zhang Jijun	44	—N/a	30
Rap x Dance	iKon	"Rhythm Ta"	Vocal 2	Ke Mingkai	72	—N/a	27
Rap x Dance	iKon	"Rhythm Ta"	Vocal 3	Nam Son	42	—N/a	32
Vocal & Dance	Wanna One	"Energetic"	Vocal 1	Yoo Gwan-woo	90	—N/a	21
Vocal & Dance	Wanna One	"Energetic"	Vocal 2	Ling Qi	81	—N/a	23
Vocal & Dance	Wanna One	"Energetic"	Vocal 3	Xin Che	79	—N/a	24
Vocal & Dance	Wanna One	"Energetic"	Vocal 4	He Xilong	73	—N/a	25
Vocal & Dance	Wanna One	"Energetic"	Vocal 5	Wang Kun	37	—N/a	34
Vocal & Dance	Monsta X	"Shoot Out"	Polaris	Han-gyul	104	400,104	1
Vocal & Dance	Monsta X	"Shoot Out"	Vocal 1	Lee Jun-hyuk	84	100,084	7
Vocal & Dance	Monsta X	"Shoot Out"	Vocal 2	Michael Wu	31	100,031	11
Vocal & Dance	Monsta X	"Shoot Out"	Vocal 3	Yang Dong-hwa	78	100,078	8
Vocal & Dance	Monsta X	"Shoot Out"	Vocal 4	Eden	35	100,035	9

=== Final Battle (Episode 10) ===
Performance			Contestant	
#	Producer	Song	Position	Name
1	Lyrics: TBA; Composition: TBA; Arrangement: TBA	"Pretty Dirty Boy"	Polaris	Han-gyul
1	Lyrics: TBA; Composition: TBA; Arrangement: TBA	"Pretty Dirty Boy"	Vocal 1	Pentor
1	Lyrics: TBA; Composition: TBA; Arrangement: TBA	"Pretty Dirty Boy"	Vocal 2	Hong Sung-min
1	Lyrics: TBA; Composition: TBA; Arrangement: TBA	"Pretty Dirty Boy"	Vocal 3	Xin Che
1	Lyrics: TBA; Composition: TBA; Arrangement: TBA	"Pretty Dirty Boy"	Vocal 4	Yoo-jun
1	Lyrics: TBA; Composition: TBA; Arrangement: TBA	"Pretty Dirty Boy"	Vocal 5	Lee Da-eul
1	Lyrics: TBA; Composition: TBA; Arrangement: TBA	"Pretty Dirty Boy"	Rapper 1	CongB
1	Lyrics: TBA; Composition: TBA; Arrangement: TBA	"Pretty Dirty Boy"	Rapper 2	Xu Shihuan
1	Lyrics: TBA; Composition: TBA; Arrangement: TBA	"Pretty Dirty Boy"	Rapper 3	Do-ha
2	Lyrics: TBA; Composition: TBA; Arrangement: TBA	"MILLIONAIRE"	Polaris	Shao Ziheng
2	Lyrics: TBA; Composition: TBA; Arrangement: TBA	"MILLIONAIRE"	Vocal 1	Duan Xingxing
2	Lyrics: TBA; Composition: TBA; Arrangement: TBA	"MILLIONAIRE"	Vocal 2	Yang Dong-hwa
2	Lyrics: TBA; Composition: TBA; Arrangement: TBA	"MILLIONAIRE"	Vocal 3	Eden
2	Lyrics: TBA; Composition: TBA; Arrangement: TBA	"MILLIONAIRE"	Vocal 4	Min-jae
2	Lyrics: TBA; Composition: TBA; Arrangement: TBA	"MILLIONAIRE"	Vocal 5	He Xilong
2	Lyrics: TBA; Composition: TBA; Arrangement: TBA	"MILLIONAIRE"	Vocal 6	Ling Qi
2	Lyrics: TBA; Composition: TBA; Arrangement: TBA	"MILLIONAIRE"	Rapper 1	Lee Jun-hyuk
2	Lyrics: TBA; Composition: TBA; Arrangement: TBA	"MILLIONAIRE"	Rapper 2	Zai

== Ranking ==
=== Top 9 ===
The top 9 contestants were chosen through popularity online voting through the iQIYI mobile app and audience live voting, as shown at the end of each episode.

Color key

New Top 9 (Note: Indicates contestants who had never placed in the Top 9 in any prior elimination rounds or ranking announcements.)

List of Top 9 contestants
#	Ep. 2	Ep. 3	Ep. 5	Ep. 6	Ep. 7	Ep. 9	Ep. 10
1	Yoo Gwan-woo	Yoo Gwan-woo	Yoo Gwan-woo	Yoo Gwan-woo	Shao Ziheng (▲1)	Shao Ziheng	Shao Ziheng
2	Sun Yinghao	Sun Yinghao	Sun Yinghao	Shao Ziheng (▲1)	Yoo Gwan-woo (▼1)	Han-gyul (▲1)	Lee Jun-hyuk (▲1)
3	Shao Ziheng	Shao Ziheng	Shao Ziheng	Sun Yinghao (▼1)	Han-gyul (▲1)	Lee Jun-hyuk (▲3)	Xu Shihuan (▲3)
4	Han-gyul	Han-gyul	Han-gyul	Han-gyul	Sun Yinghao (▼1)	Pentor (▲4)	Xin Che (▲5)
5	Pentor	Pentor	Pentor	Zhang Jijun (▲3)	Zhang Jijun	Yang Dong-hwa (▲2)	Pentor (▼1)
6	Duan Xingxing	Duan Xingxing	Duan Xingxing	Pentor(▼1)	Lee Jun-hyuk (▲1)	Xu Shihuan (▲29)	Han-gyul (▼4)
7	Lee Jun-hyuk	Lee Jun-hyuk	Lee Jun-hyuk	Lee Jun-hyuk	Yang Dong-hwa (▲2)	Hong Sung-min (▲3)	Zai (▲3)
8	Lee Da-eul	Lee Da-eul	Zhang Jijun (▲5)	Duan Xingxing (▼2)	Pentor (▼2)	Duan Xingxing (▲1)	Yang Dong-hwa (▼3)
9	He Xilong	Min-jae (▲1)	Min-jae	Yang Dong-hwa (▲7)	Duan Xingxing (▼1)	Xin Che (▲3)	Lee Da-eul (▲5)

=== First voting period ===
The first voting period took place from October 26 to November 16, 2024.

Voters could vote for three, five, or seven boys per day depending on their subscription to iQIYI.

At the end of the second episode, all votes for the eliminated contestants were discarded.

=== Result ===
Finale results
Rank	Name	Points	Company
1	Shao Zi-heng	2,144,491	Warner Music China
2	Lee Jun-hyuk	1,532,218	Individual Trainee
3	Xu Shi-huan	1,431,896	Individual Trainee
4	Xin Che	882,415	UN24
5	Pentor	693,895	Insight Entertainment
6	Han-gyul	607,642	PocketDol Studio
7	Zai	562,335	Catwalk Company
8	Yang Dong-hwa	415,097	Bluedot Entertainment
9	Lee Da-eul	277,835	Individual Trainee

== Discography ==
=== Singles ===
Title	Date (2024)	Album
"Good Luck (Be My Luck)"	November 1	Non-album single

== Post-Competition ==
The debut group POLARIX will be active for 2 years and 6 months, and managed by iQIYI.

Other contestants
- Some contestants returned to their original groups:
  - Yoo-jun (10th), Do-ha (13th-18th), and Min-jae (13th-18th) returned to BAE173.
    - On November 6, 2026, Doha (13th-18th) filed a lawsuit against PocketDol to terminate his contract with the label with issues of payment, unilateral suspension of activities, the agency’s deteriorating financial situation, and breakdown of trust. Do-ha won the lawsuit and departed from the team.
    - On June 30, 2026, Yoo-jun (10th) and Min-jae (13th-18th) had ended their exclusive contracts with PocketDol.
  - Hong Sung-min (12th), Ling Qi (13th-18th), and Hikari (19th) returned to Fantasy Boys.
    - On November 19, 2025, Hong Sung-min (12th) filed a lawsuit against PocketDol to suspend his validity of the contract due to similar reasons like Do-ha (13th-18th). On May 14, 2026, Hong Sung-min won the lawsuit and departed from Fantasy Boys as well as PocketDol.
  - Eden (13th-18th) returned to NINE.i.
  - Nam Son (21st-33rd) returned to PICKUS.
    - PICKUS disbanded sometime in late 2025.
- Some contestants left their agency:
  - Ivan (21st-33rd) left Yu Xiao Media and returned to Malaysia for planning his solo career.
- Some contestants will debut or debuted in new boy groups, released music as solo artists, or released music under their groups:
  - Sun Jiayang (28th) officially debuted in iNKODE's Kpop boy group VAYONN on July 6, 2026.
- Some contestants participated in other survival shows:
  - Sun Jiayang (28th), Bian Shiyu (39th), Luo Junwei (52nd), Ngan Chau-yuet (65th) were contestants on Boys II Planet. Luo Junwei left the show prior to its airing, ranking between 134th and 136th, Ngan Chau-yuet was eliminated in the second episode after ranking 88th, Bian Shiyu was eliminated in the fifth episode after ranking 64th, and Sun Jiayang was eliminated in the eighth episode after ranking 35th.
    - Ngan Chau-yuet (65th) participated in the Boys II Planet spin-off show Planet C: Home Race. He went onto debut in the winning group Modyssey, after ranking 7th.

== Franchise ==
Main articles: Youth With You.
