= BAE173 =

South Korean boy band

- BAE173 in 2021

Background information
- Origin: Seoul, South Korea
- Genre: K-pop
- Years active: 2020–2026
- Label: PocketDol Studio
- Past members: J-Min; Muzin; Junseo; Youngseo; Bit; Yoojun; Hangyul; Doha; Dohyon
- Website: pocketdol.co.kr/artist/BAE173

BAE173 (Korean: 비에이이173) was a South Korean boy band formed and managed by PocketDol Studio. The group debuted on November 19, 2020, with their first EP Intersection: Spark. The group originally consisted of nine members: J-Min, Hangyul, Yoojun, Muzin, Junseo, Youngseo, Doha, Bit and Dohyon. Dohyon left the group on June 22, 2023, following contract termination with PocketDol Studio. Hangyul left the group after his contract with the label expired on February 28, 2026. Doha left the group on April 16, 2026, following contract suspension. Yoojun, Muzin, Junseo, Youngseo, and Bit left the group on June 30, 2026, as their contracts with the label also expired—effectively disbanding the group. Currently, only J-Min is signed to PocketDol Studio, but he has been on hiatus from BAE173 since February 2025 to focus on activities with temporary project group, Close Your Eyes.

== Name ==
The first three letters stand for "Before Anyone Else" which is followed by the number '1', described as the number for perfection, and the numbers '73', described as a "perfect lucky number". The group name is pronounced by uttering each letter and number in order, "B-A-E-1-7-3".

== History ==
=== Pre-debut ===
Prior to debut, members Hangyul and Dohyon participated in Produce X 101, where both finished in the top 11, securing their debut with X1. Following the early disbandment of X1 due to the Mnet vote manipulation investigation, Hangyul and Dohyon went on to debut as the duo, H&D, in April 2020.

Beginning September 5, 2020, the members were teased 3 times a week until all members were revealed. On September 25, 2020, the group name "BAE173" was announced.

=== 2020–2023: Debut with Intersection: Spark, subsequent albums, participation in Peak Time and Dohyon's departure ===
BAE173 released their debut EP, Intersection: Spark, on November 19, 2020, with the title track "Crush on U". The group held an online showcase that was broadcast simultaneously on V Live and YouTube. Their debut music video for "Crush on U" went on to reach 10 million views in 6 days. On November 29, the group released a follow-up track dedicated to fans titled "Every Little Thing is You (모두 너야)". The track featured writing credits from member Dohyon.

On April 8, 2021, BAE173 released their second EP Intersection: Trace with the lead single "Loved You".

On March 30, 2022, BAE173 released their third EP Intersection: Blaze with the lead single "Jaws". Dohyon participated in the lyrics of "Jaws" and was the sole producer, composer, lyricist and performer for the track ″Runnin'″. On May 20, 2022, BAE173 held a fansign event at Nissho Hall in Tokyo, Japan at 12:00 p.m. on the 20th. In addition, the 2022 BAE173 Fan Meeting in Japan - Hajimete was held at 6 p.m. of the same day and at 6 p.m. on May 21 again.

On August 17, 2022, BAE173 released their fourth EP Odyssey: DaSH with the lead single "DaSH". Dohyon was the main producer, composer and lyricist on all three songs of the album which led to the group being promoted as a "self-producing boyband".

In February 2023, it was announced that BAE173 (excluding Dohyon, who was on hiatus at the time after contracting COVID-19) would be one of 24 contestants in the JTBC idol group survival show Peak Time. They were introduced in the show as Team 13:00, as all participating teams were assigned an hour of the day in order to maintain anonymity within the context of the show. BAE173 reached the finals and finished in fifth place, after which their group name was revealed on-screen. Through the show, the group received and released two new songs, "Criminal" and "GT".

On April 28, 2023, Dohyon filed an injunction against PocketDol Studio to suspend his exclusive contract following his hiatus after contracting COVID-19 and inactivity in BAE173's recent schedules. On June 22, 2023, it was announced that Dohyon had left both Pocketdol Studio and the group after winning his dispute against the label.

=== 2024–present: New Chapter: Luceat, members' participation in Project 7 and Starlight Boys, New Chapter: Desear and PocketDol Studio contract terminations ===
On March 13, 2024, BAE173 went on to release their fifth EP New Chapter: Luceat with the lead single "Fifty-Fifty".

Starting October 18, 2024, J-Min, Muzin, Junseo, and Youngseo participated in JTBC's reality competition show Project 7. On December 27, during Project 7's finale, member J-Min finished in 3rd place, placing him in the line-up of the project boy group Close Your Eyes. The remaining members, Muzin, Youngseo, and Junseo, were eliminated in the final episode, finishing in 11th, 17th, and 21st places respectively.

Starting October 26, 2024, Hangyul, Doha, Bit, and Yoojun participated in iQIYI's reality competition Starlight Boys. On December 28, during Starlight Boys' finale, member Hangyul finished in 6th place, placing him in the line-up of the project boy group POLARIX. The remaining members, Yoojun, Doha, and Bit were eliminated in the final episode.

On November 6, 2025, Doha was reported to have filed an injunction against PocketDol Studio to suspend his exclusive contract on grounds of the contract being invalid in the first place. Doha revealed the lawsuit included “issues with payments, the agency’s deteriorating financial situation, unilateral suspensions of activities, and a breakdown of trust.” The lawsuit revealed that PocketDol Studio is in horrendous financial debt to where the company can’t pay for everything and Doha’s reason for the suspension of activities was because Doha was put on a hiatus unknowingly. PocketDol Studio, in response, released a statement explaining the management's side of the story, citing unprofessional attitude from Doha over multiple instances, including during the filming of Starlight Boys. On April 16, 2026, the court sided with Doha to suspend his exclusive contract, after which he presumably departed from the group as he began venturing out to solo activities.

On October 23, 2025, BAE173 released their first full-length album New Chapter: Desear with the lead single "Turned Up" following two pre-release tracks ("One Day" and a remake of T-ARA's "What's Wrong") as a 6-member group including Hangyul, Yoojun, Muzin, Junseo, Youngseo, and Bit. J-Min did not participate in this album as he was on hiatus from BAE173 since February 2025 to focus on activities with Close Your Eyes.

On February 28, 2026, Hangyul's contract with Pocketdol Studio ended.

On July 14, 2026, PocketDol Studio released a statement regarding of the contracts of the remaining members Yoojun, Muzin, Junseo, Youngseo, and Bit. The statement announced that the members’ exclusive contracts had ended on June 30, 2026, and that each member was going to go on their separate ways; thus confirming the group had effectively disbanded.

== Members ==
=== Former ===
- J-Min (제이민)
- Hangyul (한결)
- Yoojun (유준)
- Muzin (무진)
- Junseo (준서)
- Youngseo (영서)
- Doha (도하)
- Bit (빛)
- Dohyon (도현)

== Discography ==
=== Extended plays ===
List of extended plays, with selected details, chart positions and sales
Title	EP details	Peak positions	Sales
Title	EP details	KOR	Sales
Intersection: Spark	Released: November 19, 2020; Label: PocketDol Studio, Kakao M; Formats: CD, digital download, streaming; Track listing: 1. "Prelude: With Me"; 2. "Crush On U" (반하겠어); 3. "Fly"; 4. "I'll Never Say" (죽어도 못하는 말); 5. "Every Little Thing Is You" (모두 너야) (CD only)	12	KOR: 18,785
Intersection: Trace	Released: April 8, 2021; Label: PocketDol Studio, Kakao M; Formats: CD, digital download, streaming; Track listing: 1. "#Trace"; 2. "Loved You" (사랑했다); 3. "I Can't Sleep"; 4. "Green Light"; 5. "Loved You" (사랑했다) (Inst.)	32	KOR: 21,397
Intersection: Blaze	Released: March 30, 2022; Label: PocketDol Studio, Kakao Entertainment; Formats: CD, digital download, streaming; Track listing: 1. "Runnin'"; 2. "Annoyed" (짜증나게); 3. "Jaws"; 4. "Not Alone" (혼자가 아니야); 5. "Jaws" (Inst.)	14	KOR: 27,141
Odyssey: Dash	Released: August 17, 2022; Label: PocketDol Studio, Kakao Entertainment; Formats: CD, digital download, streaming; Track listing: 1. "Get Him Ugh" (걸음마); 2. "Dash"; 3. "Toez"; 4. "Dash" (Inst.)	9	KOR: 33,373
New Chapter: Luceat	Released: March 13, 2024; Label: PocketDol Studio, Kakao Entertainment; Formats: CD, digital download, streaming; Track listing: 1. "Fifty-Fifty"; 2. "Crimson"; 3. "You" (너)	8	KOR: 70,599
New Chapter: Desear	Released: October 14, 2025; Label: PocketDol Studio, Kakao Entertainment; Formats: Digital download, streaming; Track listing: 1. "Turned Up"; 2. "Snap"; 3. "Blackout"; 4. "What"; 5. "Nobody"; 6. "BAE (Before Anyone Else)"	11	KOR: 53,460

=== Singles ===
List of singles, showing year released, chart positions and album name
Title	Year	Peak chart positions	Album
Title	Year	KOR Down.	Album
"Crush On U" (반하겠어)	2020	—	Intersection: Spark
"Every Little Thing is You" (모두 너야)	2020	—	Non-album single
"Loved You" (사랑했다)	2021	191	Intersection: Trace
"Jaws"	2022	—	Intersection: Blaze
"Dash"	2022	121	Odyssey: Dash
"Fifty-Fifty"	2024	124	New Chapter: Luceat
"Turned Up"	2025	—	New Chapter: Desear
"—" denotes releases that did not chart or were not released in that region.

=== Other charted songs ===
List of other charted songs, showing year released, chart positions and album name
Title	Year	Peak chart positions	Album
Title	Year	KOR Down.	Album
"You" (너)	2024	194	New Chapter: Luceat
"Crimson"	2024	195	New Chapter: Luceat

=== Collaborations ===
List of collaborations
Title	Year	Member(s)	Other artist(s)	Album
"Shining Bright" (빛 날거야)	2021	All	Ciipher and Woo!ah!	Non-album singles
"Your Time"	2023	All	Peak Time Top 6 (Vanner, Sevenus, Team 24:00, DKB, M.O.N.T)	Non-album singles
"Lies All Love"	2024	J-Min and Youngseo	A Six (Lee Han-bin and Ling Qi of Fantasy Boys, and Won Ji-min and Park Bo-eun of Classy)	Non-album singles
"To. My Dear"	2024	J-Min, Hangyul and Youngseo	Fantasy Boys (Hong Sung-min and Kim Gyu-rae only)	Non-album singles

=== Other appearances ===
List of appearances on other albums
Title	Year	Album
"I Need U" (orig. song by BTS)	2020	Immortal Songs: Singing the Legend (BTS X Pdogg Special)
"Tiger Inside" (Note: Credited as "Team 13:00") (orig. song by SuperM)	2023	Peak Time – Survival Round
"La Song" (orig. song by Rain)	2023	Peak Time – 1 Round <Rival match> Part.1
"My Bag" (Note: Credited as "Rap C Unit", only features J-Min and Doha) (orig. song by (G)I-dle)	2023	Peak Time – 2 Round <Union match> Part.1
"Way Back Home" (Note: Credited as "Vocal C Unit", only features Youngseo) (orig. song by BtoB)	2023	Peak Time – 2 Round <Union match> Part.1
"Criminal"	2023	Peak Time – 3 Round <Originals match>
"GT" (Prod. Kenzie)	2023	Peak Time – <Final Round>

== Videography ==
=== Music videos ===
Title	Year	Director(s)	Ref.
"Crush on U"	2020	N/A	
"Every Little Thing Is You"	2020	N/A	
"Loved You"	2021	SUNNYVISUAL	
"I Can't Sleep"	2021	N/A	
"Jaws"	2022	N/A	
"Dash"	2022	N/A	

== Filmography ==
=== Television shows ===
List of television show appearances
Year	Title	Network	Role	Notes	Ref.
2020	Immortal Songs: Singing the Legend	KBS	Contestant	Ep. 481: BTS X Pdogg Special	
2023	Peak Time	JTBC	Contestant as Team 13:00	5th Place	

== Awards and nominations ==
Name of the award ceremony, year presented, award category, nominee(s) of the award, and the result of the nomination
Award ceremony	Year	Category	Nominee(s)	Result	Ref.
Asia Artist Awards	2021	Male Idol Group Popularity Award	BAE173	Nominated	
Asia Artist Awards	2021	U+ Idol Live Popularity Award	BAE173	Nominated	
Asia Artist Awards	2023	Popularity Award – Music	BAE173	Longlisted	
Hanteo Music Awards	2025	Post Generation Award	BAE173	Nominated	
