= Yoon Do-gun =

South Korean actor (born 1998)

- Born: Kim Yoon-sik; May 18, 1998 (age 28); South Korea
- Education: Dongguk University
- Occupation: Actor
- Years active: 2018–present

Korean name
- Hangul: 김윤식
- RR: Gim Yunsik
- MR: Kim Yunsik

Stage name
- Hangul: 윤도건
- RR: Yun Dogeon
- MR: Yun Togŏn

Kim Yoon-sik (Korean: 김윤식; born May 18, 1998), formerly known as Yoon Do-gun (윤도건), is a South Korean actor. He is best known for his roles in Trade Your Love (2019), I Am a Running Mate (2025), and The Prosecutor's Proposal (2026).

== Career ==
Kim began his acting career in 2018 under the stage name Yoon Do-gun, debuting in the web dramas High School Diary and MU:D Vol.1. In 2019, he made his feature film debut in the romantic comedy Trade Your Love, portraying the character Cho Hwan-seung. He gaining public attention in January 2019 when he was featured as the "January Boyfriend" in the project campaign The Twelve. He made his first television appearance on KBS Joy's talk dating variety show Love Naggers (Seasons 2 and 3). In January 2022, he landed his first leading role in a digital format, starring as Guk-eul in the romantic comedy web drama I'm Done. In September 2025, Kim signed an exclusive management contract with Log Studio to oversee his mainstream acting career. He was subsequently cast in a supporting role as Kang Jae-won in the TVING series I Am a Running Mate (2025). In 2026, Kim began using his birth name, Kim Yoon-sik, for his professional activities. He was cast in the leading role of Ju Tae-seon in the television series The Prosecutor's Proposal, alongside Park Siwoo. Following the conclusion of series, Kim and co-star Park Si-woo embarked on an international promotional tour, holding series-joint fan meetings in major Asian cities including Seoul, Macao, Bangkok, and Hong Kong throughout the latter half of 2026. In late 2026, Kim secured two major television and streaming projects scheduled to release in 2027, marking his transition into mainstream terrestrial networks and global streaming platforms. In October 2026, he was cast as Yang Ji-hoon, a chaebol branch manager and male lead in the JTBC romance-fantasy drama 50 Days of Flirting, performing alongside co-stars Jang Da-ah and Cha Woo-min. Following this, Kim expanded his streaming footprint by joining the supporting cast of the Netflix original crime-noir action series The Shooter, directed by Lee Kwon.

== Philanthropy ==
On November 4, 2026, Kim donated ₩10 million to the ChildFund Korea (Green Umbrella) to support treatment and living expenses for children suffering from tic disorders. He shared that he chose to support this cause because he personally experienced tic disorders in the past.

== Filmography ==
=== Film ===
Year	Title	Role	Notes	Ref.
2021	Trade Your Love	Jung Ju-seok		

=== Television series ===
Year	Title	Role	Notes	Ref.
2021	Hospital Playlist		Season 2	
2025	I Am a Running Mate	Kang Jae-won		
2026	The Prosecutor's Proposal	Ju Tae-seon		
2027	50 Days of Flirting †	Yang Ji-hoon		
TBA	The Shooter †			

=== Web series ===
Year	Title	Role	Notes	Ref.
2018	High School Diary			
2018	MU:D Vol.1	Woo-jin		
2022	I'm Done	Guk-eul		
