= The Prosecutor's Proposal =

2026 South Korean television series

- Promotional poster
- Hangul: 검사실의 제안
- Hanja: 檢事室의 提案
- Lit.: The Prosecutor's Office's Proposal
- RR: Geomsasirui jean
- MR: Kŏmsasirŭi chean
- Genre: BL; Workplace; Romance; Crime
- Based on: The Prosecutor's Office's Proposal by He Bok
- Written by: JD
- Directed by: Yang Kyung-hee
- Starring: Kim Yoon-sik; Park Siwoo
- Opening theme: "Marionette" by Zena
- Country of origin: South Korea
- Original language: Korean
- No. of episodes: 10

Production
- Running time: 19–30 minutes
- Production company: Oak Company

Original release
- Network: Wavve: GagaOOLala
- Release: June 26 – July 24, 2026

The Prosecutor's Proposal (Korean: 검사실의 제안) is a 2026 South Korean BL workplace romance crime television series written by JD, directed by Yang Kyung-hee, and starring Kim Yoon-sik and Park Siwoo. It is based on the web novel The Prosecutor's Office's Proposal by He Bok. The series depicts the story of a prosecutor and an investigator who track the truth behind a case, coming to understand each other and develop feelings while investigating a series of incidents together. It streamed on Wavve from June 26 to July 24, 2026, with two episodes released every Friday, for a total of 10 episodes. It is also available for streaming on iQIYI and GagaOOLala in selected regions.

== Synopsis ==
The murder of a prominent casino mogul fifteen years prior set the course of two boys' lives. One was left as the "son of the victim" with no father and the other was marked as the "son of the killer" due to his father's crime. As adults, they meet again as a prosecutor and an investigator.

Lee Chae-ha, the "son of a killer", works in the Fine Enforcement Department. He investigates a power abuse case involving the youngest daughter of a conglomerate and a director at Danhyeon Land Casino. Prosecutor Ju Tae-seon, the "son of a victim" and nicknamed "office psychopath", is assigned to the case after the duty prosecutor is replaced. The two are dispatched together to investigate a murder near the casino.

Ju Tae-seon, Kang Woo-seok's son, changes his family name from Kang to Ju. He approaches Lee Chae-ha, the son of Lee Gil-young, with a dark goal and seeks to make him suffer. Tae-seon hides his identity and asks Chae-ha to reinvestigate his father Lee Gil-young's case, which was closed in 2010 after the perpetrator's death by suicide. The two work together to uncover the truth, and eventually Tae-son develops feelings for Chae-ha.

== Cast ==
=== Main ===
- Kim Yoon-sik as Ju Tae-seon
- Park Siwoo as Lee Chae-ha

=== Supporting ===
- Kim Jung-tae as Tak Sung-woong
- Cho Min-kyu as Song Ha-neul
- Seo Han-gyeol as Oh Ja-hyun

== Production ==
=== Development ===
The series is based on the web novel The Prosecutor's Office's Proposal by He Bok. It is distributed by KT Studio Genie, produced by Oak Company, and directed by Yang Kyung-hee, considered one of the leading directors of domestic BL dramas, who previously helmed Secret Relationships (2025).

=== Casting ===
In June 2026, Kim Yoon-sik (also known as Yoon Do-gun) and Park Siwoo (former member of Blank2y) were announced by Oak Company as the series' leads. The project marks Park's official debut as a lead actor. Supporting cast included actors Kim Jung-tae, Cho Min-kyu, and Seo Han-gyeol.

== Release ==
In March 2026, The Prosecutor's Proposal was announced as part of Oak Company's 2026 BL drama lineup. Three months later, the series was confirmed to premiere on Wavve on June 26, 2026, airing every Friday at 00:00 (KST). The series is licensed and streamed outside of South Korea via the GagaOOLala and OTT platform iQIYI.

== Reception ==
Critics praised the series' fast-paced plot and noted its blend of crime thriller elements with BL themes following its premiere.

=== Ranking ===
Following its release on Wavve, the series ranked first in real-time drama rankings. It subsequently topped the daily and weekly drama rankings on the Japanese OTT platform FOD, and entered the daily and weekly top 5 for overall content. The series also ranked first in the daily and weekly Asian drama rankings in Europe and North America on iQIYI. In Vietnam, it held the number one position in iQIYI's daily, weekly, and monthly rankings.
