= Lee Han-gyul =

South Korean singer and actor (born 1999)

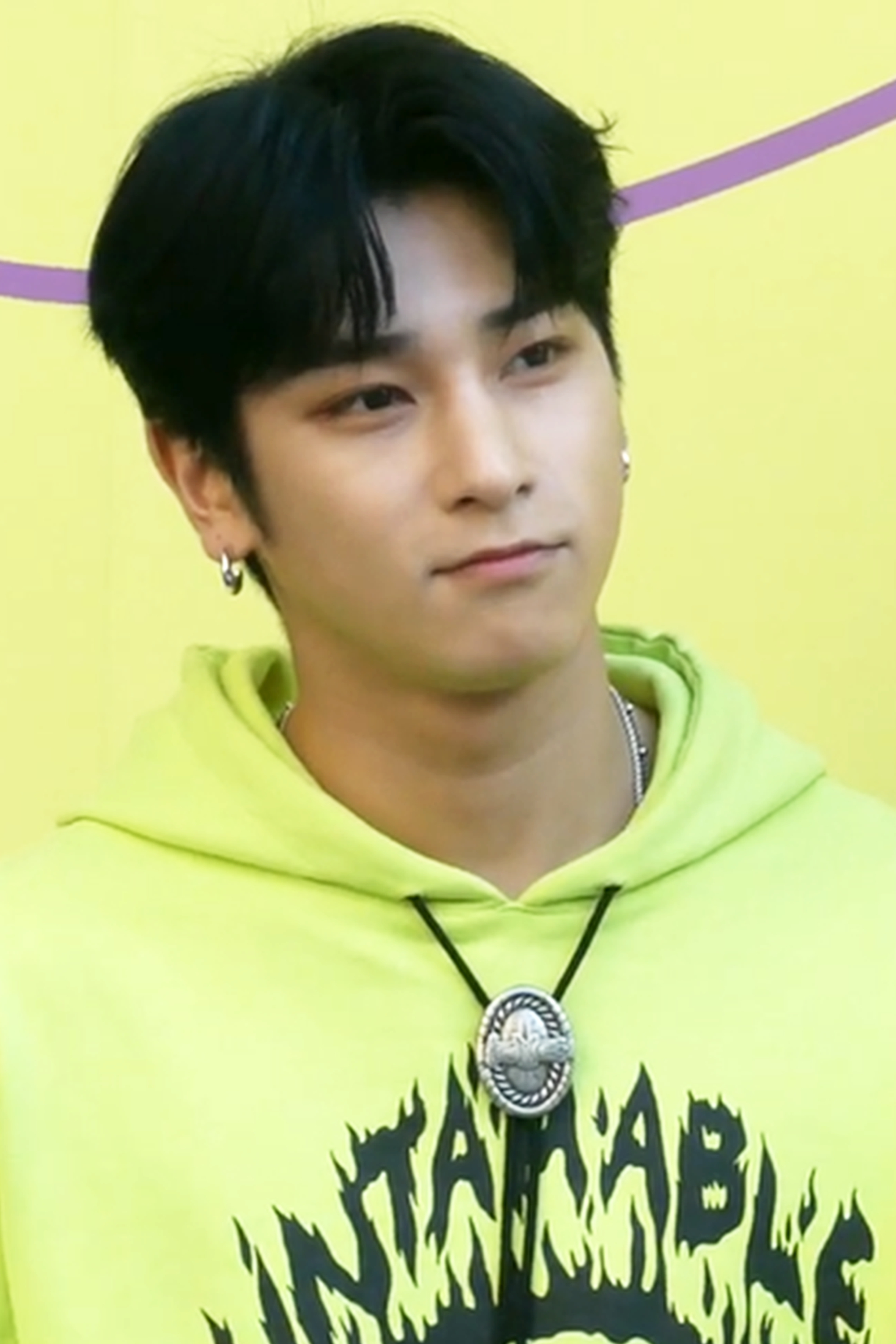
- Lee in 2019
- Born: Lee Han-gyul; December 7, 1999 (age 26); Namdong District, Incheon, South Korea
- Occupations: Singer; actor
- Musical career
- Genre: K-pop
- Instrument: Vocals
- Years active: 2017–present
- Labels: PocketDol Studio; Orca
- Formerly of: IM; X1; H&D; BAE173; POLARIX

Korean name
- Hangul: 이한결
- RR: I Hangyeol
- MR: I Han'gyŏl

Lee Han-gyul (Korean: 이한결; born December 7, 1999), known mononymously as Hangyul, is a South Korean singer and actor. He has been a member of the K-pop groups IM, X1, BAE173, and POLARIX, and was also part of the duo H&D. He made his solo debut on October 14, 2026, with his first extended play (EP), NOISE. He also starred in the 2021 web series Love in Black Hole.

== Early life ==
Lee was born on December 7, 1999, in Namdong District, Incheon, South Korea. He was abandoned as a baby and has said that he "had no idea what parents were" before the first grade. However, he has stated that he believes his birth parents "must have had a reason" for abandoning him and probably "had a hard time". When he was six, he met a volunteer at the children's home where he lived. The two grew close, and although he was later moved to another children's home, she found him again. She adopted him when he was seven. Due to this, instead of fans sending him traditional gifts on his birthday, his fans have chosen to instead donate to orphanages in his name.

During elementary and middle school, Lee trained in taekwondo for eight years. After experiencing a slump around his third year of middle school, he joined a dance club. Through the club, he began dancing and participated in a dance competition, which led to him being scouted by and subsequently signing with PocketDol Studio.

== Career ==
=== 2017–2019: Debut with IM and survival shows ===
Hangyul as a member of IM in 2017

Lee debuted as a member of the K-pop group IM. He subsequently participated in the survival competition shows The Unit: Idol Rebooting Project and Produce X 101. Through the latter, he was selected to join X1, a group formed by the show's contestants. However, X1 disbanded following the Mnet vote manipulation investigation. Lee has spoken about the difficulties of having to debut repeatedly.

=== 2020–2021: H&D and acting ===
Lee later debuted as part of the duo H&D with fellow singer Nam Dohyun. In May 2020, he appeared in his first solo pictorial for The Star magazine. The duo later disbanded as both members joined BAE173.

In 2021, Lee made his acting debut in the science fiction fantasy romance web series Love in Black Hole, in which he played one of the main characters.

=== 2022–2025: BAE173 and POLARIX ===
As a member of BAE173, Lee participated in the reality competition shows Peak Time and Starlight Boys. Following the latter, he was selected to join the resulting group POLARIX, while continuing his activities with BAE173.

=== 2026–present: Solo debut ===
Lee signed with Orca Music in 2026. He made his solo debut on October 14, 2026, with his first EP, NOISE, marking his sixth debut in the music industry. The EP featured the Latin pop song "BUNZI" as its lead single and included four additional tracks.

Lee pledged to bungee jump 52 times if the EP reached first place on the charts. He chose the number because the word "Bungee" is repeated 52 times in the song.

The JoongAng Ilbo highlighted the dance sections of "BUNZI", writing that Lee's "performance of pouring out energy with his entire body makes viewers want to jump and play along".

== Personal life ==
Lee has a dog named Deokbae. He has noted his high proportion of fans in their 30s or 40s, and attributed it to his face "look[ing] older than his age".

== Discography ==
=== Extended plays ===
Title	Details
NOISE	Released: October 14, 2026; Lead single: "BUNZI"; Tracks: 5
