= Emergency: Quantum Leap =

2019 EP by X1

EP by X1
- Released: August 27, 2019
- Recorded: 2019
- Genre: K-pop; hip hop
- Length: 24:23
- Language: Korean
- Label: Swing; Stone

Singles from Emergency: Quantum Leap
- 1. "Flash" Released: August 27, 2019

Music video
- "Flash" on YouTube

Emergency: Quantum Leap (Korean: 비상: Quantum Leap) is the debut and only extended play by South Korean boy group X1, a project group created through the 2019 Mnet survival show Produce X 101. The album was released digitally and physically on August 27, 2019, by Swing Entertainment.

== Background and release ==
X1 was formed through the reality show Produce X 101, the fourth season of Mnet's Produce 101 series of competition shows. With the show wrapping up in July 2019, the group's label, Swing Entertainment, announced that X1 would make their official debut on August 27, 2019.

The debut EP, titled Emergency: Quantum Leap, was announced on August 1. Concept images featuring each of the members were released from August 9 to August 19.

On August 19, the tracklist was revealed, with X1 recording their own version of the songs "X1-MA", "U Got It" and "Move" from Produce X 101 for the EP. In addition, there are also four new songs included: an intro titled "Stand Up", the lead single "Flash" composed by Score, Megatone and Onestar (Monotree), "Like Always" and "I'm Here for You".

The full EP and music video for "Flash" were released on August 27, 2019.

== Promotion ==
Prior to their debut, the group began promotions through their reality show X1 Flash, which premiered on August 22, 2019, on the cable channel Mnet. The reality show followed the members as they prepared for their debut.

The group debuted on August 27, 2019, with a debut showcase at Gocheok Sky Dome.

The group had their first music show performance on Mnet's M! Countdown on August 29, 2019. They won their first music trophy on SBS MTV's The Show on September 3.

== Track listing ==
No.	Title	Lyrics	Music	Arrangement	Length
1.	"Stand Up" (Intro)	Hwang Hyun (Monotree); Park Cheol-eun	Hwang Hyun (Monotree)	Hwang Hyun (Monotree); Park Cheol-eun	2:12
2.	"Flash" (stylized as FLAϟH)	Score; Megatone; Onestar (Monotree)	Score; Megatone; Onestar (Monotree); 88247	Score; Megatone; Onestar (Monotree)	3:33
3.	"Like Always" (웃을 때 제일 예뻐 (Eng. Lit. You're the Prettiest When You Smile))	Jeong Ho-hyun (e.one)	Jeong Ho-hyun (e.one); Uno Buckx	Jeong Ho-hyun (e.one)	3:26
4.	"I'm Here for You" (괜찮아요 (Eng. Lit. It's Okay))	Score; Megatone; Door	Score; Megatone; Door; J.Rise	Score; Megatone	4:42
5.	"U Got It" (X1 version)	Kiggen	Noheul; Sean Alexander; Drew Ryan Scott; Eginius	Noheul	3:10
6.	"Move" (움직여; X1 version) (prod. Zico)	Zico	Zico; Poptime	Zico; Poptime	3:07

Emergency: Quantum Leap – Physical edition bonus track
No.	Title	Lyrics	Music	Arrangement	Length
7.	"X1-MA" (지마; X1 version)	Produce X 101	Fredrik `Figge` Bostrom; Cho Min-Kyung; Albin Nordqvist	Fredrik `Figge` Bostrom; Cho Min-Kyung; Albin Nordqvist	4:13
Total length:					24:23

== Charts ==
=== Weekly charts ===
Chart (2019)	Peak position
French Digital Albums (SNEP)	76
Japanese Albums (Oricon)	4
Japan Hot Albums (Billboard)	10
Polish Albums (ZPAV)	22
South Korean Albums (Gaon)	1
US World Albums (Billboard)	9

=== Year-end charts ===
Chart (2019)	Position
South Korean Albums (Gaon)	4

== Awards and nominations ==
=== Music program wins ===
Program	Date	Ref.
The Show (SBS MTV)	September 3, 2019	
The Show (SBS MTV)	September 10, 2019	
Show Champion (MBC Music)	September 4, 2019	
Show Champion (MBC Music)	September 18, 2019	
M Countdown (Mnet)	September 5, 2019	
M Countdown (Mnet)	September 12, 2019	
M Countdown (Mnet)	September 19, 2019	
Music Bank (KBS)	September 6, 2019	
Music Bank (KBS)	September 13, 2019	
Inkigayo (SBS)	September 8, 2019	
Inkigayo (SBS)	September 15, 2019	
