= H&D =

South Korean musical duo

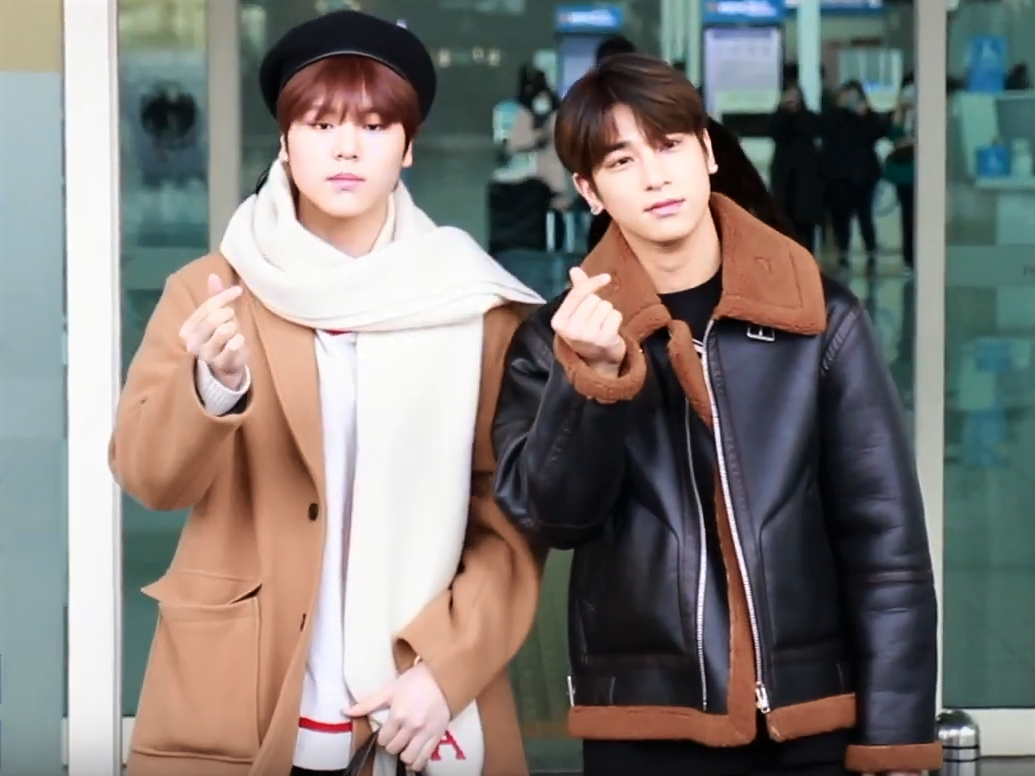
- H&D in February 2020 (L-R: Dohyon and Hangyul)

Background information
- Origin: Seoul, South Korea
- Genre: K-pop
- Years active: 2020
- Label: Pocketdol Studio
- Spinoffs: BAE173
- Past members: Hangyul; Dohyon

H&D (Korean: 한결,도현) was a South Korean duo formed by Pocketdol Studio in 2020. The duo debuted on April 21, 2020, with Soulmate.

== Past members ==
- Lee Hangyul (이한결)
- Nam Do-hyon (남도현)

== History ==
=== Pre-debut ===
Prior to their debut as a duo, both members had participated as contestants on multiple shows. Hangyul had previously debuted as a member of Yama and Hotchicks Entertainment's ballad group IM and in 2017 and 2018, competed in the show The Unit alongside his members. The group is considered to be disbanded as they've been inactive since. Dohyon previously competed in the show Under Nineteen in 2018 and 2019.

Later in 2019, both Hangyul and Dohyon competed in Produce X 101, representing MBK Entertainment, alongside fellow MBK trainee Kim Yeongsang. In the show's finale, Hangyul and Dohyon placed 7th and 8th respectively, making them part of the show's debut line-up and members of the group X1. They promoted with the group until their disbandment on January 6, 2020.

After X1's disbandment, the two held a fan meeting titled "Happy Day" on February 2, 2020.

=== 2020: Debut ===
On April 21, the duo debuted with their first extended play Soulmate with two title tracks, "Soul" and "Goodnight", both of which they performed during their promotion period.

On September 2, it was announced that the duo would make a comeback on September 23 with the special album Umbrella, including the title track of the same name. The album includes songs composed by Dohyon. This was their last album before the duo disbanded, as both Hangyul and Dohyon then debuted in Pocketdol Studio's boy group BAE173.

== Discography ==
=== Extended plays ===
Title	Details	Peak chart positions	Sales
Title	Details	KOR	Sales
Soulmate	Released: April 21, 2020; Label: Pocketdol Studio; Formats: CD, digital download	3	KOR: 30,159

=== Special albums ===
Title	Details	Peak chart positions	Sales
Title	Details	KOR	Sales
Umbrella	Released: September 23, 2020; Label: Pocketdol Studio; Formats: CD, digital download	12	KOR: 8,174

=== Singles ===
Title	Year	Peak chart positions	Album
Title	Year	KOR Down.	Album
"Toward Tomorrow" (오늘보다 더 나은 내일)	2020	—	Soulmate
"Soul"	2020	91	Soulmate
"Good Night"	2020	—	Soulmate
"Umbrella" (우산)	2020	—	Umbrella
"—" denotes releases that did not chart.

== Awards and nominations ==
Name of the award ceremony, year presented, award category, nominee(s) of the award, and the result of the nomination
Award ceremony	Year	Category	Nominee(s)	Result	Ref.
Golden Disc Awards	2021	Rookie Artist of the Year	H&D	Nominated	
