= Fantasy Boys (group) =

South Korean boy band

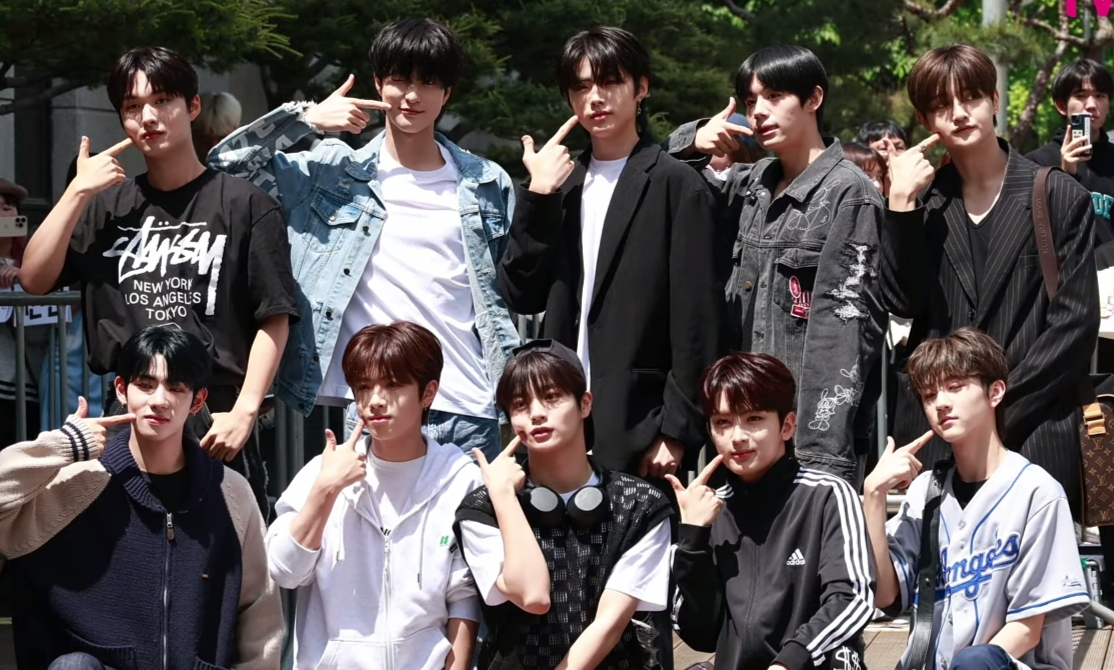
- Fantasy Boys in May 2024

Background information
- Origin: Seoul, South Korea
- Genres: K-pop
- Years active: 2023–present
- Labels: PocketDol Studio; M25
- Members: Hikari; Ling Qi; Kim Woo-seok; Oh Hyeon-tae
- Past members: K-Soul; Kang Min-seo; Lee Han-bin; Hikaru; Hong Seong-min; Kim Gyu-Rae; Kaedan

Fantasy Boys (Korean: 판타지 보이즈; stylized in all caps) is a South Korean multinational boy band formed through MBC TV's reality competition series of the same name in 2023, and managed by PocketDol Studio and M25. The group consists of four members: Hikari, Ling Qi, Kim Woo-seok, and Oh Hyeon-tae. Originally 11 members, but K-Soul was announced he was leaving the group. Kang Min-seo, Lee Han-bin, Hikaru, Hong Seong-min, Kim Gyu-Rae, and Kaedan presumably left the group after suspending their contracts on April 21, 2026. They debuted on September 21, 2023, with the extended play (EP) New Tomorrow.

== History ==
=== Pre-debut activities ===
Soul (formerly referred to as K-Soul) was a contestant on the competition shows Super Idol in 2015 and We Are Young in 2018.

In 2016, Ling Qi was a member of the pre-debut Chinese boy group X-Time and in 2018 he participated in the survival competition show Idol Producer. He was eliminated in episode 8 and finished 58th overall.

In 2022, Yu Jun-won was a contestant on Hybe Label Japan's survival show &Audition – The Howling, but was eliminated in the final episode and did not make it into the final lineup of the boy group, &Team.

=== 2023–present: Formation through Fantasy Boys, debut, K-Soul's departure, and lawsuit ===
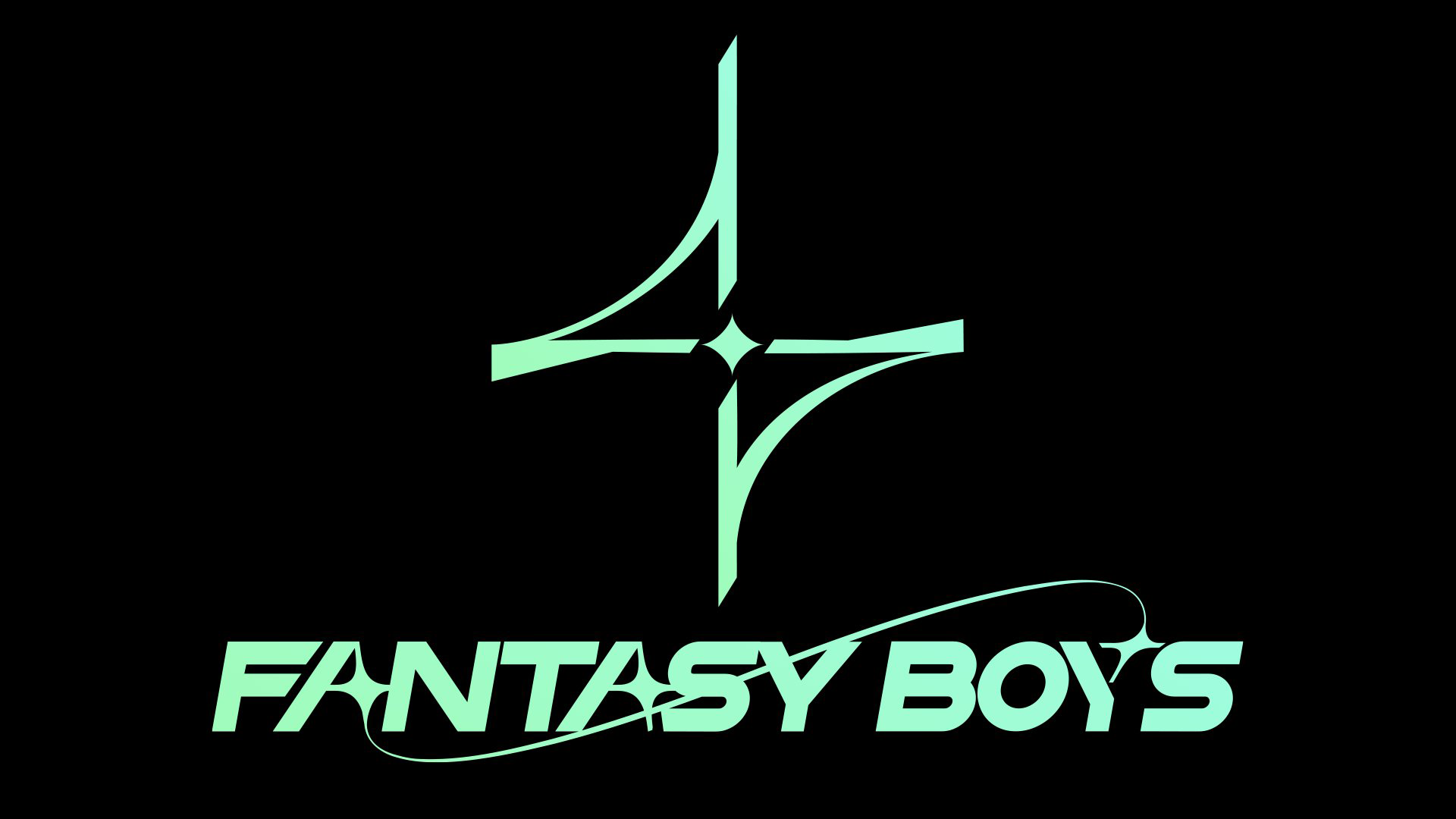
Fantasy Boys' official logo.

Fantasy Boys was formed through MBC TV's reality competition show Fantasy Boys, which aired from March 30 to June 8, 2023. The show brought 55 contestants from around the world, primarily in South Korea, China, Hong Kong, Taiwan, Japan, Thailand, and the United States, to compete and to debut in a multinational boy group. Out of 55 contestants, only the top twelve would make the final lineup. All members were announced on the finale episode, which was broadcast live on June 8, 2023. On August 14, 2023, it was announced that the group would be debuting in September. On August 23, it was announced that Fantasy Boys will debut as an 11-member group without Yu Jun-won due to disagreement between his parents and the agency. On September 16, Fantasy Boys performed "One Shot" from their debut EP on Show! Music Core. Fantasy Boys released their debut EP New Tomorrow on September 21, 2023. They held a media showcase at Blue Square Mastercard in the same day. On the next day, the group made their debut stage on the Music Bank.

on November 16, the group promoted the song "Potential", which will be featured on their upcoming second EP of the same name on M Countdown. The EP was released on November 23, along with the music videos for the lead track of the same name and "Get It On".

Kang Min-seo and Lee Han-bin participated in JTBC's reality competition show Project 7. Hong Sung-min, Hikari, and Ling Qi participated in IQIYI's reality competition show Starlight Boys. On December 20, Kang Min-seo and Lee Han-bin were eliminated in the third elimination round in episode 11, finished in 22nd and 23rd place respectively. On December 21, Hikari was eliminated in the second elimination round in episode 9 and ranked 19th in the show. On December 28, Hong Sung-min and Ling Qi were eliminated in the final round in episode 10.

On January 25, 2025, it was announced via fan café post that K-Soul will no longer be part of Fantasy Boys with his ongoing 15 month hiatus. K-Soul confirmed he found out by the post and left Pocketdol too. Thus making the group ten members going forward.

On November 19, 2025, it was reported that members Hikaru, Lee Hanbin, Hong Sungmin, Kang Minseo, Kim Gyurae, & Kaedan have all sued PocketDol due to suspend the validity of their contracts to a variety of issues with payment, the agency's financial and operational problems, and a breakdown of trust due to non-fulfillment of contractual obligations.

On April 21, 2026, Kang Minseo, Lee Hanbin, Hikaru, Hong Sungmin, Kim Gyurae, and Kaedan were granted to be free from PocketDol. PocketDol Studios and Phunky Studios later announced they would file for an appeal. On May 14, 2026, the label’s appeal got rejected, granting the members to fulfill independent activities.

== Members ==
- Hikari (ヒカリ; 히카리)
- Ling Qi (凌崎; 링치)
- Kim Woo-seok (김우석)
- Oh Hyeon-tae (오현태)

Former member :

- K-Soul (苏尔; 소울)
- Kang Min-seo (강민서)
- Lee Han-bin (이한빈)
- Hikaru (ヒカル; 히카루)
- Hong Sung-min (홍성민)
- Kim Gyu-rae (김규래)
- Kaedan (케이단)

== Discography ==
=== Studio albums ===
List of studio albums, with selected details, chart positions, and sales
Title	Details	Peak chart positions	Sales
Title	Details	JPN	Sales
Shine the Way	Released: March 12, 2025; Label: Nippon Columbia; Formats: CD, digital download, streaming	8	JPN: 9,578

=== Extended plays ===
List of extended plays, with selected details, chart positions, and sales
Title	Details	Peak chart positions		Sales
Title	Details	KOR	JPN	Sales
New Tomorrow	Released: September 21, 2023; Label: Kakao Entertainment; Formats: CD, digital download, streaming; Track listing: 1. "New Tomorrow"; 2. "One Shot"; 3. "Shangri-La"	7	16	KOR: 112,353; JPN: 8,365
Potential	Released: November 23, 2023; Label: Kakao Entertainment; Formats: CD, digital download, streaming; Track listing: 1. "Get It On"; 2. "Potential"; 3. "Get It On" (English ver.); 4. "Potential" (English ver.)	11	50	KOR: 33,570; JPN: 1,050
Make Sunshine	Released: May 2, 2024; Label: Kakao Entertainment; Formats: CD, digital download, streaming; Track listing: 1. "Pitter-Patter-Love" (분명 그녀가 나를 보고 웃잖아); 2. "Make Sunshine" (몰랐어 첫사랑인지 스쳐가는 감정인 건지); 3. "Feeling"; 4. "Pitter-Patter-Love" (분명 그녀가 나를 보고 웃잖아; Acoustic ver.)	5	—	KOR: 57,832
Make a Fantasy	Released: June 19, 2024; Label: Nippon Columbia; Formats: CD, digital download, streaming	—	4	JPN: 7,246
Undeniable	Released: March 20, 2025; Label: Kakao Entertainment; Formats: CD, digital download, streaming; Track listing: 1. "Undeniable"; 2. "Flare"; 3. "별하늘 (幻想)"	5	—	KOR: 58,664

=== Singles ===
List of singles, showing year released, selected chart positions, and name of the album
Title	Year	Peak chart positions	Album
Title	Year	KOR DL	Album
Korean
"New Tomorrow"	2023	136	New Tomorrow
"Potential"	2023	—	Potential
"Pitter-Patter-Love" (분명 그녀가 나를 보고 웃잖아)	2024	—	Make Sunshine
"Undeniable"	2025	—	Undeniable
Japanese
"New Tomorrow" (Japanese Ver.)	2024	—	Make A Fantasy
"Fantasy" (Japanese Ver.)	2025	—	Shine The Way
"—" denotes a recording that did not chart or was not released in that region.

== Filmography ==
Year	Name	Notes	Ref.
2023	Fantasy Boys	Reality competition show determining Fantasy Boys' members	
2023	Boys Fantasy: Welcome to Fantasy World	Debut talk show	

== Concerts ==
- Fantasy Boys Fan Concert in Japan (2023)

== Awards and nominations ==
Name of the award ceremony, year presented, award category, nominee(s) of the award, and the result of the nomination
Award ceremony	Year	Category	Nominee / work	Result	Ref.
Asia Star Entertainer Awards	2024	Hot Icon	Fantasy Boys	Won	
Asia Star Entertainer Awards	2025	Hot Icon	Fantasy Boys	Won	
Hanteo Music Awards	2023	Rookie of the Year – Male	Fantasy Boys	Nominated	
Seoul Music Awards	2023	Rookie of the Year	Fantasy Boys	Nominated	
