= Fantasy Boys =

South Korean reality competition program

- Also known as: My Teenage Boy
- Hangul: 소년판타지 – 방과후 설렘 시즌2
- Lit.: Boy Fantasy – After School Excitement Season 2
- RR: Sonyeon pantaji – banggwa hu seollem sijeun 2
- MR: Sonyŏn p'ant'aji – panggwa hu sŏllem sijŭn 2
- Genre: Reality competition
- Created by: MBC
- Directed by: Han Dong-chul
- Presented by: Max Changmin
- Opening theme: "Fantasy" by Fantasy Boys
- Ending theme: "I'll Be" by Fantasy Boys
- Country of origin: South Korea
- Original language: Korean
- No. of episodes: 11

Production
- Executive producer: Kang Young-sun
- Producer: Chae Hyun-seok
- Production location: South Korea
- Running time: 85–122 minutes
- Production companies: MBC; Phunky Studio; Naver; PocketDol Studio

Original release
- Network: MBC TV
- Release: March 30 – June 8, 2023

Related
- My Teenage Girl

Fantasy Boys (Korean: 소년판타지 – 방과후 설렘 시즌2) is a 2023 South Korean reality competition program created by MBC. It aired on MBC TV from March 30 to June 8, 2023, every Thursday at 22:00 (KST). The finale was broadcast live and announced the twelve final members to formed the final group, Fantasy Boys. The show serves as a sequel to My Teenage Girl, this time featuring all male contestants.

== Concept and format ==
In June 2022, the production company, Phunky Studios, held meetings with 53 entertainment agencies to discuss the production of a male version of My Teenage Girl. A month later, it was announced that over 1,000 trainees from all over the world, including Japan, China, the United States, Australia, and Thailand, had applied for the privately held global auditions Any boys aged 14 and over, regardless of nationality, were eligible to audition. Further contestants were originally scheduled to be recruited through public auditions from November 18 to December 16, 2022, but the recruitment period was later extended to December 31.

The show's goal is to create a global K-pop boy group composed of trainees from all around the world. Aside from regular promotions, the new boy group will also participate in webtoon character, game, digital content, and NFT (Non-Fungible Token) projects.

== Promotion and broadcast ==
In November 2022, the program's title was confirmed as Fantasy Boys and multiple teaser videos were released between November 18 and December 2, 2022. On February 20, 2023, profile photos and videos for the 55 contestants were released through the official website and social media accounts. The music video for the theme song "Fantasy" was released on the 27th. On March 6, Phunky Studio announced that in addition to the music video, a special performance video for "Fantasy" would be released. Filming for the video took place at a large-scale set at a gym in Gyeonggi Province from March 6–7.

On March 1, an offline high-touch meeting entitled 'Hi! Fantasy' was held prior to the show's premiere at the COEX Convention & Exhibition Center. Over 5,000 fans from around the globe applied for the event.

On March 17, it was announced that the broadcast of the first episode of Fantasy Boys would be postponed from March 23 to March 30 because a global OTT platform had agreed to simultaneously broadcast the program worldwide. Fantasy Boys is being simulcast through MBC TV and Naver NOW in South Korea, Abema in Japan, and iQIYI in 12 more countries, namely Japan, Taiwan, Singapore, Malaysia, Brunei, Thailand, the Philippines, Indonesia, Myanmar, Vietnam, Cambodia, and Laos.

== Cast ==
- Host: Changmin (TVXQ)
- Main Producers (also known as Mentors):
  - Jang Wooyoung (2PM)
  - Jeon Soyeon ((G)I-dle)
  - Jin-young (B1A4)
  - Kang Seung-yoon (Winner)
- Rap Teachers:
  - Hanhae
  - Kebee
- Vocal Teachers:
  - Jang Jin-young
  - Park Su-min
  - Jeong Woong-min
- Dance Teachers:
  - Yoo Kwang-yeol
  - Lee Kwang-taek
- Guest:
  - Choi Min-ho (Shinee) (Special host; Episodes 5–6)

== Contestants ==
The English spelling of the Korean and Chinese contestants' names are presented in Eastern order according to the official website, while the Japanese contestants' names are presented in Western order. The Korean names of the non-Korean contestants are listed along with their names in their native languages.

Color Key

Final members of Fantasy Boys
Eliminated in the final episode
Eliminated in the semifinals
Eliminated in the fourth semester
Eliminated in the third semester
Eliminated in the second semester
Eliminated in the first semester
Left the show

55 contestants South Korea, China, Taiwan, Japan, Thailand, U.S.
1st Grade
Yu Jun-won (유준원)	Hong Seong-min (홍성민)	Lee Han-bin (이한빈)	Hikari (ヒカリ) / (히카리)	K-Soul (苏尔) / (소울)
Kim Woo-seok (김우석)	Hikaru (ヒカル) / (히카루)	Hwang Jae-min (황재민)	Kang Dae-hyun (강대현)	Tae Seon (태선)
Kang Hyun-woo (강현우)	Kang I-rang (강이랑)	Kim Dae-hui (김대희)	Jeong Deun-haesol (정든해솔)	Hinata (ヒナタ) / (히나타)
2nd Grade
Kim Gyu-rae (김규래)	Oh Hyeon-tae (오현태)	Ling Qi (凌崎) / (링치)	Kang Min-seo (강민서)	Kaedan (카에단)
Ha Seok-hee (하석희)	Keum Jin-ho (금진호)	Santa (แซนต้า) / (산타)	Kim Beom-jun (김범준)	Nam Seung-hyun (남승현)
Park hyung-geun (박형근)	Seo Sang-woo (서상우)	Song Du-hyun (송두현)	Shiryu (シリュウ) / (시류)	Kim Seung-jun (김승준)
Ivan (蔡弘燁) / (아이반)	Choi Min-seo (최민서)	Park Min-geun (박민근)	Bae Jae-ho (배재호)	Moon Hyeok-jun (문혁준)
3rd Grade
Moon Hyun-bin (문현빈)	Yuma (ユウマ) / (유우마)	Hayato (ハヤト) / (하야토)	Jin Myung-jae (진명재)	Daniel Hyunoo Lachapelle (복다니엘)
Kim Kyu-hyun (김규현)	TK (ทีเค) / (티케이)	Yaya (ยอด) / (야야)	Bae Seung-yoon (배승윤)	Cho Yeon-woo (조연우)
Ha Jae-min (하재민)	Jeon Byeong-cheol (전병철)	Jung Bo-moon (정보문)	Jung Goo-hyun (정구현)	Kang Seon-jun (강선준)
Long Guohao (龙国豪) / (롱궈하오)	Moon Jae-young (문재영)	Nam Jin-myung (남진명)	Oh Byeong-yong (오병용)	Park Seong-min (박성민)

== Ranking ==
=== Top 12 ===
Color key

New Top 12 (Note: Indicates contestants who had never placed in the Top 12 in any prior elimination rounds or ranking announcements.)

List of Top 12 contestants
#	Ep. 2	Ep. 5	Ep. 7	Ep. 8	Ep. 10	Ep. 11
1	Santa	Hong Sung-min (▲2)	Hong Sung-min	Hong Sung-min	Yu Jun-won (▲1)	Yu Jun-won
2	Yu Jun-won	Yu Jun-won	Yu Jun-won	Yu Jun-won	Hong Sung-min (▼1)	Kim Gyu-rae (▲13)
3	Hong Sung-min	Hikari (▲5)	Lee Han-bin (▲14)	Tae-seon (▲3)	Kim Woo-seok (▲2)	Hong Sung-min (▼1)
4	Yaya	K-Soul (▲3)	Oh hyun-tae (▲6)	Hikaru (▲7)	Hikaru	Oh hyun-tae (▲10)
5	Moon Hyun-bin	Ling Qi (▲5)	Moon Hyun-bin (▲3)	Kim Woo-seok (▲10)	K-Soul (▲7)	Lee Han-bin (▲3)
6	Tae-seon	Santa (▼5)	Tae-seon (▲3)	Moon Hyun-bin (▼1)	Hikari (▲8)	Ling Qi (▲1)
7	K-Soul	Kang Dae-hyun (▲10)	K-Soul (▼3)	Ling Qi (▲1)	Ling Qi	Kang Min-seo (▲4)
8	Hikari	Moon Hyun-bin (▼3)	Ling Qi (▼3)	Kang Dae-hyun (▲4)	Lee Han-bin (▲15)	Hikari (▼2)
9	Yuma	Tae-seon (▼3)	Kang Min-seo (▲7)	Santa (▲20)	Tae-seon (▼6)	K-Soul (▼4)
10	Ling Qi	Oh hyun-tae (▲9)	Kim Gyu-rae (▲4)	Kim Gyu-rae	Hwang Jae-min (▲6)	Kim Woo-seok (▼7)
11	Kang Hyun-woo	Yaya (▼7)	Hikaru (▲11)	Oh hyun-tae (▼7)	Kang Min-seo (▲2)	Hikaru (▼7)
12	Kim Gyu-rae	Kim Woo-seok (▲12)	Kang Dae-hyun (▼7)	K-Soul (▼5)	Santa (▼3)	Kaedan (▲6)

=== Producer Pick ===
The main producer for each semester chooses a contestant to send through to the next round.

Semester	Contestant	Main Producer	Notes
1	Moon Hyun-bin	Jeon Soyeon	Early pass was given during the interim check and saved from Grade 3 contestants eliminations.
2	Park hyung-geun	Jang Wooyoung	Eliminated contestant chosen to be saved and continue onto the third semester.
3	Daniel Hyunoo Lachapelle	Jin-young	Eliminated contestant chosen to be saved and continue onto the fourth semester.
4	Ha Seok-hee	Kang Seung-yoon	Eliminated contestant chosen to be saved and continue onto the semifinals.

== Discography ==
=== Extended plays ===
List of extended plays, with selected details
Title	Details
Fantasy Boys – Semi Final	Released: June 2, 2023; Label: Kakao Entertainment; Formats: Digital download, streaming; Track listing: 1. "Spaceman"; 2. "뒤어 (Run)"; 3. "Snacks"; 4. "꽉 잡아 (Hold Tight)"

=== Single albums ===
List of single albums, with selected details
Title	Details
Fantasy Boys – Final	Released: June 9, 2023; Label: Kakao Entertainment; Formats: Digital download, streaming; Track listing: 1. "Shut Off"; 2. "Gesture"; 3. "이쓸게 (I'll Be)"

=== Singles ===
List of singles, showing year released, and name of the album
Title	Year	Album
"Fantasy"	2023	Non-album single
"Spaceman"	2023	Fantasy Boys – Semi Final
"Run" (뒤어)	2023	Fantasy Boys – Semi Final
"Snacks"	2023	Fantasy Boys – Semi Final
"Hold Tight" (꽉 잡아)	2023	Fantasy Boys – Semi Final
"Shut Off"	2023	Fantasy Boys – Final
"Gesture"	2023	Fantasy Boys – Final

== Ratings ==
Average TV viewership ratings
Ep.	Original broadcast date	Average audience share (Nielsen Korea)
1	March 30, 2023	0.6% (NR)
2	April 6, 2023	0.9% (NR)
3	April 13, 2023	0.8% (NR)
4	April 20, 2023	0.6% (NR)
5	April 27, 2023	0.6% (NR)
6	May 4, 2023	0.5% (NR)
7	May 11, 2023	0.5% (NR)
8	May 18, 2023	0.5% (NR)
9	May 25, 2023	0.6% (NR)
10	June 1, 2023	0.5% ((NR)
11	June 8, 2023	0.5% ((NR)
Average		0.6%
Special
1	February 25, 2023	N/A
2	March 23, 2023	0.6% (NR)
3	April 9, 2023	N/A
In the table above, the blue numbers represent the lowest ratings and the red numbers represent the highest ratings.; N/A denotes ratings that were not published.; NR denotes that the show did not rank in the top 20 daily programs on that date.
