= Artbeat =

South Korean YouTube channel

YouTube information
- Channel: artbeat.official
- Subscribers: 5 million
- Views: 2.8 billion
- Last updated: November 2026

Artbeat (stylized in all caps; Korean: 아트비트) is a South Korean YouTube channel that focuses on K-pop dance content. The channel was launched in 2016. In 2021, the channel launched a K-pop girl group of the same name.

The channel was founded by Kim Jun-seok (김준석), who began by uploading videos of his peers at a college dance club. He expanded the operation to include professional dancers. By 2022, the company was based in Daegu and reportedly had 30 active dancers, with various sub organizations. By June 2022, the channel had accumulated 3.81 million subscribers.
