= Park Siwoo =

South Korean actor (born 2001)

- Park in 2026
- Born: February 5, 2001 (age 25); Mungyeong, Gyeongsangbuk-do, South Korea
- Education: Hanlim Arts School
- Occupation: Actor
- Years active: 2019–present
- Height: 174 cm (5 ft 9 in)

Korean name
- Hangul: 박시우
- RR: Bak Siu
- MR: Pak Siu
- Website: inuffcompany.com/sub02/sub01_view.php?it_id=1781239384

Park Siwoo (Korean: 박시우; born February 5, 2001) is a South Korean actor. He is a former member of the boy group Blank2y in which he performed under the stage name Siwoo. In 2026, he played the role of Lee Chae-ha in the series The Prosecutor's Proposal.

== Early life and education ==
Park Siwoo was born on February 5, 2001 in Mungyeong, Gyeongsangbuk-do, South Korea. He attended Hanlim Arts School.

== Career ==
Park Siwoo began his entertainment career under his birth name Park Jin-yeol(박진열). In 2019, he participated in Mnet's survival show Produce X 101 as an independent trainee.

In 2021, Park participated in MBC's survival show Extreme Debut: Wild Idol.

On February 1, 2022, Park was revealed as the fourth member of BLANK2Y, a boy group formed by Keystone Entertainment. He made his debut with the group as a rapper on May 24, 2022 with their first mini-album K2Y I:Confidence[Thumbs Up]. On June 27, 2023, Keystone Entertainment announced the termination of its exclusive contracts with the group's members.

In 2024, Park participated in the iQIYI survival show Starlight Boys.

In 2026, Park was cast in the web series The Prosecutor's Proposal as Lee Chaeha, his first leading role in a series. The 10- episode series premiered on June 26, 2026. The drama reached first place on Wavve's real time drama rankings during its run.

In May 2026, Park established Inuff Company, a creative company where he serves as the CEO while continuing his career as an actor.

Park was named an honorary ambassador for Mungyeong, his hometown, at the closing ceremony of the 2026 Mungyeong Tea Bowl Festival.

In 2026, Park expanded his activities into fashion. In September, he made his first appearance at Milan Fashion Week, where he attended the MM6 Maison Margiela and Marni shows. In October, he attended the Lanvin and Valentino shows at Paris Fashion Week.

== Filmography ==
=== Television series ===
| Year | Title | Role | Notes | Ref. |
|---|---|---|---|---|
| 2025 | Thundercloud Rainstorm | young Seo Jeong-han | Supporting role | |
| 2026 | The Prosecutor's Proposal | Lee Chae-ha | Main role | |

=== Web series ===
| Year | Title | Role | Notes | Ref. |
|---|---|---|---|---|
| 2021 | I:Love:DM | Park Siwoo | Main role | |
| 2026 | Expo, Magic Hour | Lee Joo-han | Main role | |

=== Television shows ===
| Year | Title | Role | Notes |
|---|---|---|---|
| 2019 | Produce X 101 | Contestant | Eliminated in episode 5 (rank 81) |
| 2021 | Extreme Debut: Wild Idol | Contestant | Eliminated in episode 3 |
| 2024 | Starlight Boys | Contestant | Eliminated in episode 5 |
