= Ciipher =

South Korean boy band

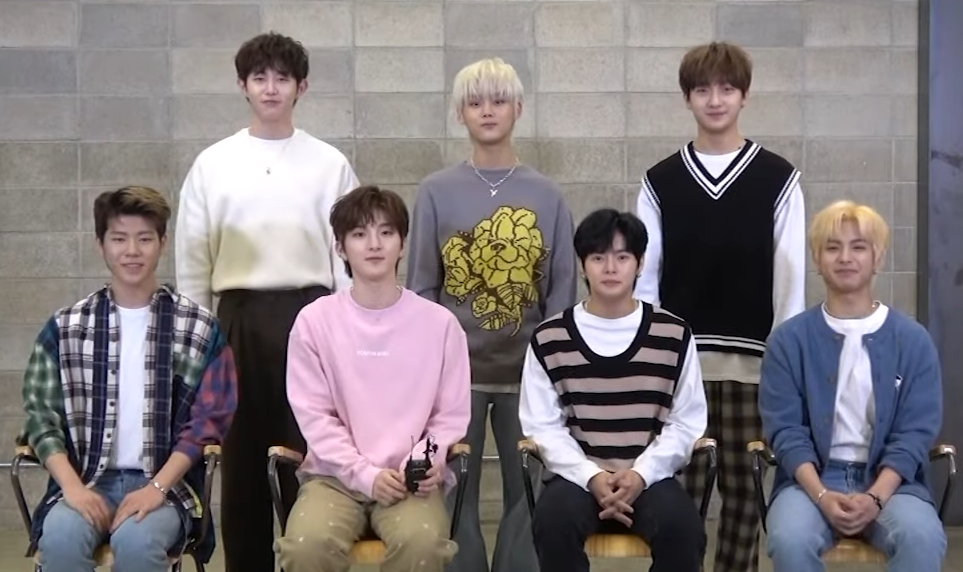
- Ciipher in 2021; Top: L-R: Tan, Tag, Won, Bottom: L-R: Dohwan, Hyunbin, Hwi, Keita

Background information
- Origin: South Korea
- Genres: K-pop; EDM; R&B
- Years active: 2021–2025
- Label: R.A.I.N. Company
- Past members: Tan; Tag; Dohwan; Won; Hwi; Hyunbin; Keita

Ciipher (Korean: 싸이퍼; RR: Ssaipeo) is a South Korean boy band created by South Korean singer Rain under R.A.I.N. Company. The group consisted of three members: Hwi, Hyunbin, and Keita. Ciipher was originally a seven-piece ensemble; members Tan, Tag, Dohwan, and Won left the group on August 9, 2023. They debuted on March 15, 2021, with the extended play (EP) I Like You.

== History ==
=== Pre-debut ===
Preparation for the debut of the group has been three years in the making. About selecting the members for the first group signed under his R.A.I.N company, Rain said, "There were a lot of factors involved in the process of making Ciipher, but when I met these kids, I felt like I could bet it all on them. Not just my time or my skill, but all the things I had and have made. Whether the group has good results or not, I don't think I'll regret the things that I gave to this group. That's how talented and well-mannered they are".

Prior to joining the group, many of the members had auditioned on popular television programs or trained at other major labels. In December 2014, Tan competed in Mnet's survival reality show No.Mercy under his birth name Choi Seok-won. However, he did not make it into the final lineup of Monsta X in 2015. Keita and Dohwan were former contestants on YG's Treasure Box, but they both did not make it into the show's final debut lineup. Won was a contestant on Under Nineteen under his birth name Park Sung-won. He became a member of the debut lineup as he finished in 7th place. Won debuted as a member of 1the9 on April 13, 2019, and the group officially disbanded as a group on August 8, 2020. Hyunbin was a former contestant on Produce X 101 under Starship Entertainment, and was eliminated on episode 8, finishing in 32nd place.

=== 2021: Debut with I Like You and Blind ===
On December 12, 2020, Rain announced Ciipher would debut with their first extended play I Like You on March 15, 2021.

On September 28, 2021, Ciipher released their second extended play Blind.

=== 2022–present: The Code, Boys Planet and Fantasy Boys, Evnne and disbandment ===
On May 11, 2022, Ciipher released their third extended play The Code.

Keita and Tag participated in Mnet's reality competition show Boys Planet. and on February 20, 2023, Hyunbin became a contestant on Fantasy Boys.

On August 3, it was revealed that Keita will debut as a member of the project boy group Evnne and on August 9, it was announced that members Tan, Tag, Dohwan, and Won had left the group. On October 5, Tag was revealed to soon debut as a member of boy group One Pact. On October 10, Armada Ent announced the group's pre-debut tour entitled 2023 One Pact Fan on Tour "The Pact" in Japan and Thailand in November 2023. Both Evnne and One Pact were formed with members who were former Boys Planet contestants.

On December 8, 2025, Keita signed with Jellyfish Entertainment to continue with the group Evnne as a permanent group. Sometime around 2025, Ciipher's profile on R.A.I.N. Company's website was deleted. This has hinted that Ciipher has disbanded presumably.

== Members ==
Adapted from their Naver profile and website profile.

=== Former ===
- Tan (탄)
- Tag (태그)
- Dohwan (도환)
- Won (원)
- Hyunbin (현빈)
- Hwi (휘)
- Keita (케이타)

== Discography ==
=== Extended plays ===
Title	Details	Peak chart positions	Sales
Title	Details	KOR	Sales
I Like You (Korean: 안꿀려; lit. 'It won't work')	Released: March 15, 2021; Label: R.A.I.N. Company, Kakao Entertainment; Formats: CD, digital download; Track listing: 1. "Solo" (모태솔로); 2. "I Like You" (안꿀려); 3. "Give Me Love"; 4. "Fire"; 5. "Fall in Love"	28	KOR: 16,475
Blind	Released: September 28, 2021; Label: R.A.I.N. Company, Kakao Entertainment; Formats: CD, digital download; Track listing: 1. "Moon Night"; 2. "Blind" (콩깍지); 3. "Joker"; 4. "Go Ahead"; 5. "That's Okay" (괜찮아)	7	KOR: 24,264
The Code	Released: May 11, 2022; Label: R.A.I.N. Company, Kakao Entertainment; Formats: CD, digital download; Track listing: 1. "The Code (Intro)"; 2. "Fame"; 3. "Slam the Door"; 4. "On a Highway"; 5. "You" (너를 다시); 6. "Stay" (있을게)	8	KOR: 12,320

=== Singles ===
==== As lead artist ====
Title	Year	Peak chart positions	Album
Title	Year	KOR Down.	Album
"I Like You" (안꿀려)	2021	45	I Like You
"Blind" (콩깍지)	2021	—	Blind
"Fame"	2022	162	The Code
"—" denotes releases that did not chart or were not released in that region.

== Videography ==
=== Music videos ===
Title	Year	Ref.
"I Like You" (안꿀려)	2021	
"Blind"	2021	
"Fame"	2022	

== Awards and nominations ==
Name of the award ceremony, year presented, award category, nominee(s) of the award, and the result of the nomination
Award ceremony	Year	Category	Nominee(s)	Result	Ref.
Asia Artist Awards	2021	Male Idol Group Popularity Award	Ciipher	Nominated	
Korea Culture Entertainment Awards	2021	K-Pop Star Award	Ciipher	Won	
