= X1 (band) =

South Korean boy band

- X1 official logo

Background information
- Origin: South Korea
- Genre: K-pop
- Years active: 2019
- Labels: Swing; Stone
- Past members: Han Seung-woo; Cho Seung-youn; Kim Woo-seok; Kim Yo-han; Lee Han-gyul; Cha Jun-ho; Son Dong-pyo; Kang Min-hee; Lee Eun-sang; Song Hyeong-jun; Nam Do-hyon

X1 (EKS-wun; Korean: 엑스원) was a South Korean boy group formed by CJ ENM through the Mnet reality competition show Produce X 101. The group was composed of eleven members: Kim Yo-han, Kim Woo-seok, Han Seung-woo, Song Hyeong-jun, Cho Seung-youn, Son Dong-pyo, Lee Han-gyul, Nam Do-hyon, Cha Jun-ho, Kang Min-hee, and Lee Eun-sang. The group debuted on August 27, 2019 with the single "Flash" under Swing Entertainment and was co-managed by Stone Music Entertainment.

Initially contracted for five years, the Mnet vote manipulation investigation led to a halt in their activities, and after an unsuccessful negotiation about the group's future between the members' individual agencies, they disbanded on January 6, 2020.

== History ==
=== Pre-debut: Produce X 101 ===
X1 was formed through the survival competition series Produce X 101, which aired on Mnet from May 3, 2019, until July 19, 2019. Out of an initial 101 trainees participating, the final 10 were chosen out of the remaining 20 trainees in the final week of the show. The final member, known as the rank X member, was selected from the remaining trainees based on the highest number of cumulative votes. All members were announced via the final episode, which was broadcast live on July 19, 2019.

Prior to the program, several members had already been active in the music industry. Cho Seung-youn debuted as a member of the group Uniq in 2014. In 2016, following his participation on Show Me the Money 5, he debuted as a solo artist under the stage name Luizy in 2016, before adopting the stage name WOODZ in 2018. He was also active as a music producer for various artists. Kim Woo-seok debuted in the group Up10tion under the name Wooshin in September 2015, and was also the host of SBS MTV's The Show alongside Produce 101 season 1 contestant and former I.O.I member Jeon So-mi in 2016. Han Seung-woo debuted as a member of the group Victon in 2016. Lee Han-gyul previously debuted as a member of Yama and Hotchicks Entertainment's ballad group IM and also competed alongside other members of IM in KBS2's The Unit, where he placed 13th overall. Nam Do-hyon was a contestant in MBC's Under Nineteen as a member of the Rap Team. Kang Min-hee was featured in the music video for Mad Clown and Ailee's song "Thirst" in 2018. Son Dong-pyo was active as a member of the dance group Artbeat in 2018.

The group's contract was initially intended to be for five years following their debut, with the first 2.5 years of the contract being an exclusive contract, followed by the second 2.5 years being a non-exclusive contract, meaning that the individual members can return to co-promote with their original agencies after the first half of their contract was over.

=== 2019: Debut and vote manipulation investigation ===
In the final episode of Produce X 101, the final eleven contestants were announced as members of X1, and were set to debut under Stone Music's Swing Entertainment, the label which housed the Produce 101 's Wanna One. However, following a civil lawsuit filed against Mnet due to Produce X 101's vote manipulation allegations, several brands cancelled their endorsement deals with X1 or put them on hold. Some of the agencies representing the contestants refused to sign the group's contract until the allegations cleared up. In spite of this, X1's debut proceeded as planned.

Ahead of their official debut, the group's reality show X1 Flash premiered on August 22, 2019 through Mnet. The reality show followed the members as they prepared for their upcoming debut, as well as a glimpse into their daily lives. On August 1, it was announced that their debut album would be titled Emergency: Quantum Leap with the title track "Flash", composed by Score, Megatone and Onestar. The group debuted on August 27, 2019 with a debut showcase at Gocheok Sky Dome. On September 3, X1 won their first-ever music show win through SBS MTV's The Show one week after debut. They received 11 wins in total for their debut song, "Flash" with their 11th win being on M Countdown on September 19.

On November 5, 2019, Ahn Joon-young, the producer of Produce X 101, was arrested, and he later admitted to manipulating the vote rankings. Subsequently, X1 had several public appearances cancelled and Mnet announced that plans for the group's promotion were on hold. On December 30, 2019, CJ ENM announced that members and their agencies were in discussions on the group's future.

=== 2020: Disbandment ===
On January 6, 2020, CJ ENM, Swing Entertainment, and the members' individual agencies held a meeting to determine the future of the group. After deliberating for an hour about whether the group should continue to promote or disband, a secret ballot was held between the members' agencies. Prior to voting, the agencies had agreed that the group could only continue if there was unanimous agreement to do so, or the group would disband. Four agencies voted in favor of the continuation of X1's activities, and four agencies voted against the continuation of X1's activities, and one agency whose vote was unclear was ultimately discarded.

During the meeting, a representative of CJ ENM relayed X1's members' request to attend the meeting in order to express to the representatives their wishes to continue promotions as a group. However, this request was turned down by another agency. Although X1 members were ultimately not invited to the meeting, Swing CEO Cho Yoo-myung later also expressed their collective desire to have attended. Thus, despite the absence of X1's members in the meeting, it was determined within 2 hours of the start of the meeting that the group would disband. The group's disbandment was officially announced to the public on the same day.

Following the decision of X1's disbandment, CJ ENM suggested that a previously recorded winter track be released as a goodbye song, but the idea was rejected by two or three of the members' agencies. Similarly, a suggestion from a member's agency to record a final video was rejected by another agency.

== Former members ==
- Kim Yo-han (김요한)
- Kim Woo-seok (김우석)
- Han Seung-woo (한승우) – leader
- Song Hyeong-jun (송형준)
- Cho Seung-youn (조승연)
- Son Dong-pyo (손동표)
- Lee Han-gyul (이한결)
- Nam Do-hyon (남도현)
- Cha Jun-ho (차준호)
- Kang Min-hee (강민희)
- Lee Eun-sang (이은상)

== Achievements ==
Prior to debut, X1 made their Billboard chart debut on the charts Social 50 and Emerging Artists at number six and number eleven respectively.

Emergency: Quantum Leap sold over 500,000 physical copies in the first week of sales, breaking the record of the highest first week sales for a debut album in South Korea; the record was previously set by solo artist, Kang Daniel with his debut album, Color on Me.

On July 26, 2020, the group's debut and only music video "Flash" reached over 100 million views on Youtube. In doing so, "Flash" became the fastest boy group debut music video to reach 100 million views on Youtube, taking 334 days to reach that number.

== Discography ==
=== Extended plays ===
Title	Album details	Peak chart positions					Sales	Certifications
Title	Album details	KOR	JPN	JPN Hot.	FRA Dig.	US World	Sales	Certifications
Emergency: Quantum Leap	Released: August 27, 2019; Label: Swing Entertainment; Formats: CD, digital download, streaming	1	4	10	76	9	KOR: 657,888; JPN: 54,029 (Phy.); JPN: 2,685 (Dig.)	KMCA: 2× Platinum

=== Singles ===
List of singles, with selected chart positions, showing year released and album name
Title	Year	Peak chart positions				Album
Title	Year	KOR	KOR Hot	JPN Hot	US World	Album
"Flash"	2019	26	3	25	15	Emergency: Quantum Leap

=== Other charted songs ===
List of other charted songs, with selected chart positions, showing year released and album name
Title	Year	Peak chart positions		Album
Title	Year	KOR	KOR Hot	Album
"Like Always" (웃을 때 제일 예뻐)	2019	69	15	Emergency: Quantum Leap
"U Got It" (X1 version)	2019	84	16	Emergency: Quantum Leap
"I'm Here for You" (괜찮아요)	2019	91	18	Emergency: Quantum Leap
"Move" (움직여) (X1 version)	2019	90	19	Emergency: Quantum Leap
"Stand Up" (intro)	2019	106	25	Emergency: Quantum Leap

== Videography ==
=== Music videos ===
Title	Year	Album	Director(s)	Ref.
"Flash"	2019	Quantum Leap	Rigend Film	

== Filmography ==
=== Television ===
Year	Network	Program	Ref.
2019	Mnet	Produce X 101	
2019	Mnet	X1 Flash	

== Awards and nominations ==
=== V Live Awards ===
Year	Recipient	Category	Result
2019	X1	Global Rookie Top 5	Won

=== Melon Music Awards ===
Year	Recipient	Category	Result
2019	X1	Best New Artist Award	Nominated

=== Mnet Asian Music Awards ===
Year	Recipient	Category	Result
2019	X1	Artist of the Year	Nominated
2019	X1	Best New Male Artist	Nominated
2019	X1	Worldwide Fans' Choice Top 10	Won
2019	X1	Worldwide Icon of the Year	Nominated

=== Gaon Chart Music Awards ===
Year	Recipient	Category	Nominated work	Result
2019	X1	Song of the Month (August)	"Flash"	Nominated
2019	X1	Album of the Quarter (3rd Quarter)	Emergency: Quantum Leap	Nominated

=== Seoul Music Awards ===
Year	Recipient	Category	Result
2019	X1	New Artist Award	Nominated
2019	X1	Popularity Award	Nominated
2019	X1	K-wave Award	Nominated
