= PocketDol Studio =

South Korean entertainment company

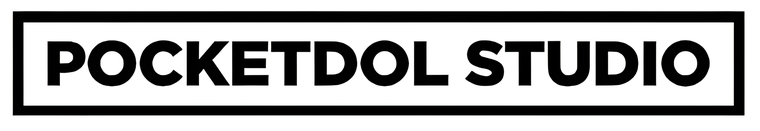
- Native name: 포켓돌스튜디오
- Type: Private
- Industry: Entertainment
- Genre: K-pop; crossover; trot
- Founded: July 12, 2017
- Founder: Kim Kwang-soo
- Number of locations: Nonhyeon-dong, Gangnam-gu, Seoul, South Korea
- Key people: Son Yong-geun (CEO)
- Owner: Lee Jae-hwan (37.47%); Park Gyu-heon (29.29%); Realworks Co., Ltd. (14.63%); Others (18.62%)
- Parent: MBK Entertainment (Defunct); Interpark
- Subsidiaries: Phunky Studio (2020); M25 (2021)
- Website: pocketdol.co.kr

PocketDol Studio (Korean: 포켓돌스튜디오), is a South Korean entertainment company established in 2017 by record producer Kim Kwang-soo. The company is best known as the home to the trot singer Bok Ji-eun, boy group BAE173 and vocal group Espero.

== History ==
=== 2017–present: Founding, transition management from MBK and expansion ===
It was established in 2017 by Kim Kwang-soo with joint venture of his company MBK Entertainment and Interpark. They firstly appearance in public as a production company was then known as The Unit: Idol Rebooting Project Culture Industry Company for survival show The Unit: Idol Rebooting Project aired by KBS2. It was later announced that PocketDol Studio would manage the winner of The Unit: Idol Rebooting Project group, UNB and UNI.T.

In February 2019, it was announced that parent company MBK Entertainment would signed the winner of the Under Nineteen group, 1the9 for one year. The group later were managed by PocketDol Studio which revealed prior to their debut in April 2019. In May 2019, the winner of the trot competition show Miss Trot producing by PocketDol Studio, Song Ga-in signed the company.

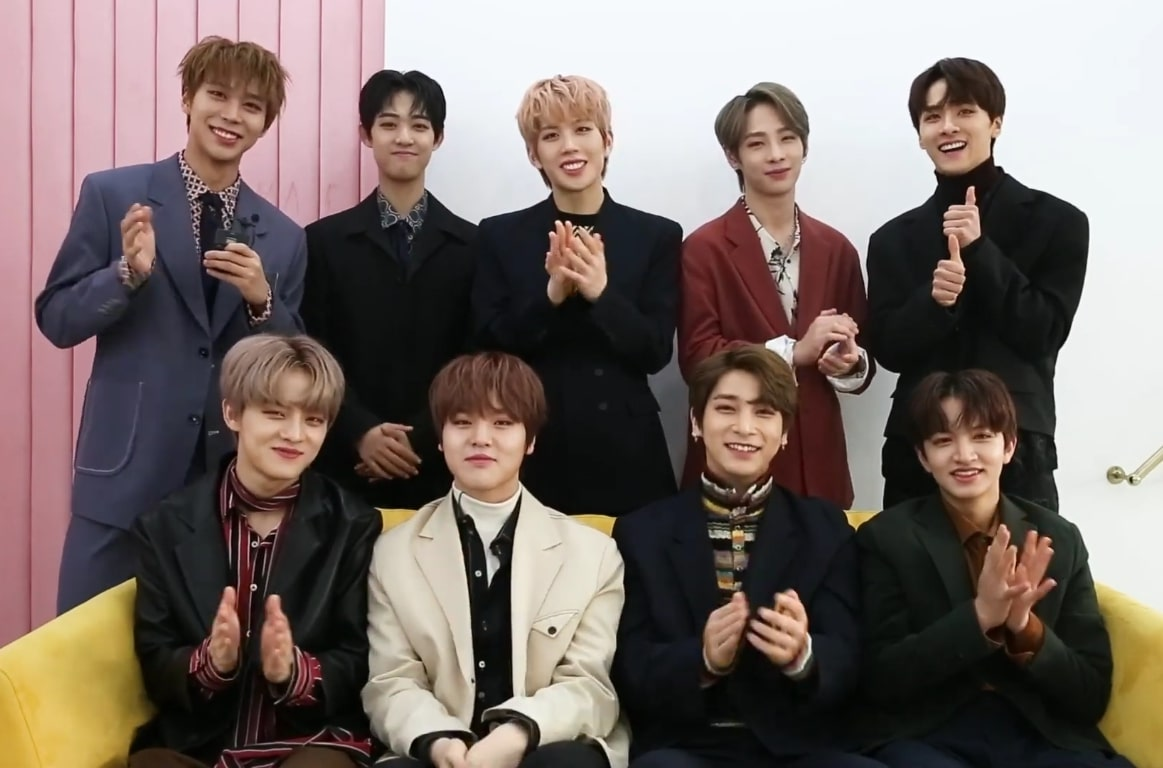
BAE173 in January 2021

In April 2020, Produce X contestant Hangyul and Dohyon debuted as duo H&D. In May 2020, DIA were transferred from MBK Entertainment to the company ahead of their comeback. In November 2020, PocketDol Studio debuted their first boy group, BAE173.

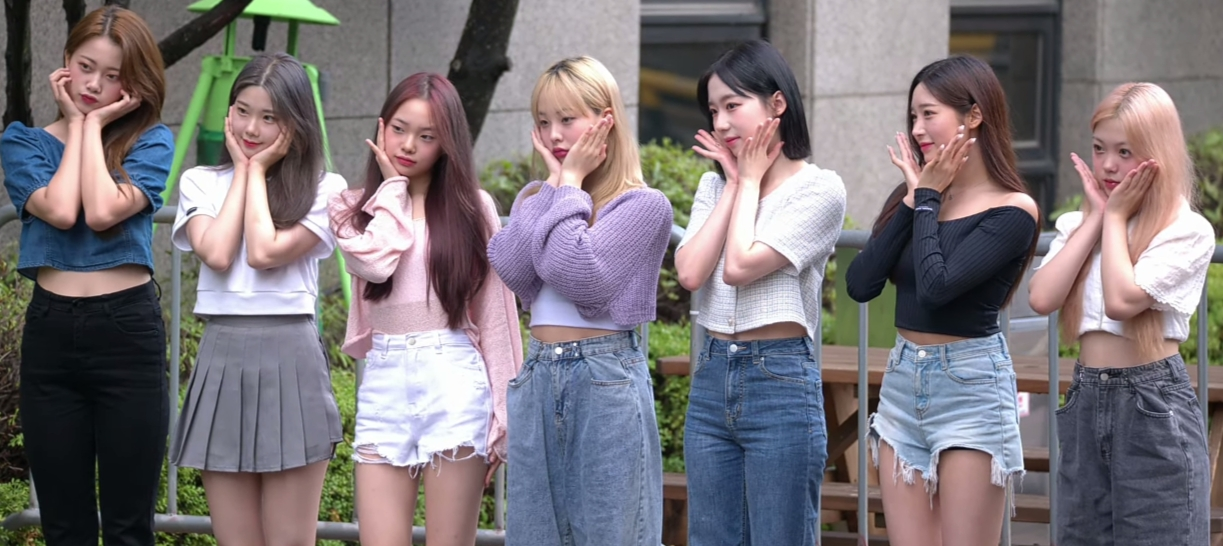
Classy road to KBS' Music Bank in July 2022

On February 27, 2022, a seven-final member were chosen through the survival show My Teenage Girl to debut in the winner group, Classy. The group debuted on May 5, 2022, through PocketDol newly established subsidiary M25. In May 2022, PocketDol signed partnership with Tobesoft for the Protection and Activation of NFT-based Choreography Copyright. In December 2022, PocketDol Studio debuted boy vocal group, Espero.

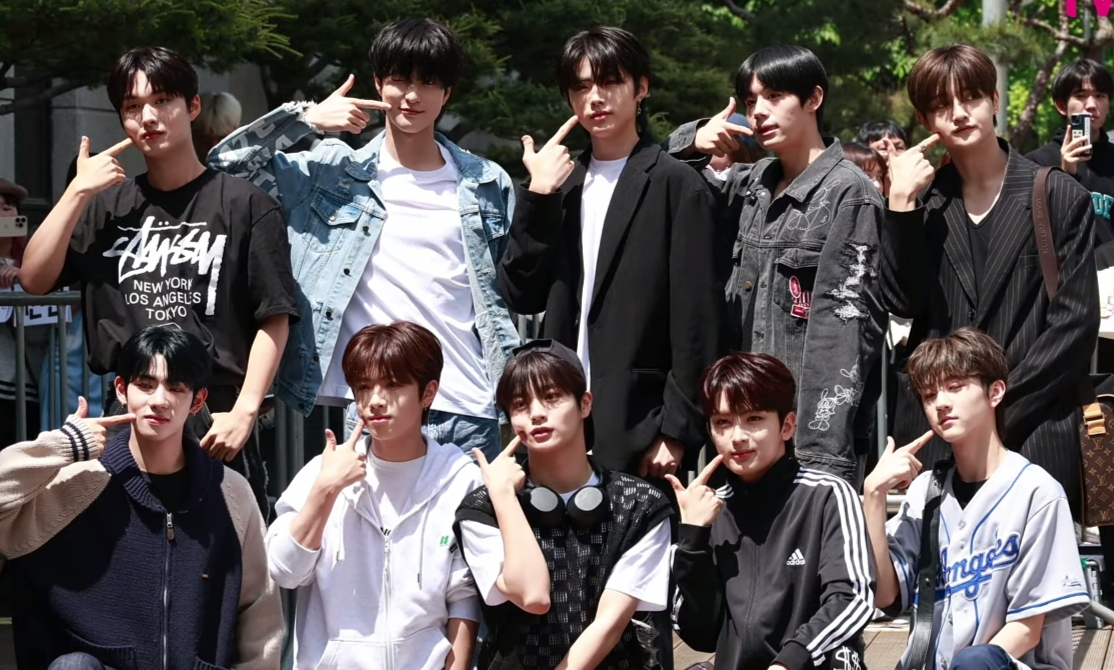
Fantasy Boys road to KBS' Music Bank in May 2024

In February 2023, it was announced that PocketDol and KS&Pick had signed a Memorandum of Understanding (MOU) with purpose to expand the AI business cooperation. In June 2023, a twelve final member were chosen through the survival show My Teenage Boys to debut on the winner group, Fantasy Boys. On June 22, 2023, it was announced that Bae173's member Nam Do-hyun left the group after the legal battle against the agency, following the suspension of the contract. In October 2023, PocketDol partnership with Balance Bay for a content planning, goods production, and pop-up specialist business.

In July 2024, PocketDol was revealed as productions behind of Show! Music Core in Japan. In September 2024, Miss Trot 3 contestant Bok Ji-eun signed the company.

== Artists ==
=== Groups ===
- Espero
- Fantasy Boys

=== Project group ===
- Double 0ne

=== Soloists ===
- Bok Ji-eun

=== Producer ===
- Kim Kwang-soo
- Cho Yi-hyun

== Former artists ==
- UNI.T (2018)
- UNB (2018–2019)
- 1the9 (2019–2020)
- Hong Ja (2019–2021)
- BAE173
  - Dohyon (2020–2023)
  - Hangyul (2020-2026)
  - Doha (2020-2026)
  - Yoojun (2020-2026)
  - Muzin (2020-2026)
  - Junseo (2020-2026)
  - Youngseo (2020-2026)
  - Bit (2020-2026)
- Song Ga-in (2019–2024)
- Fantasy Boys
  - KSoul (2023-2025)
  - Kang Minseo (2023-2026)
  - Lee Hanbin (2023-2026)
  - Hikaru (2023-2026)
  - Hong Sungmin (2023-2026)
  - Kim Gyurae (2023-2026)
  - Kaedan (2023-2026)
- Class:y (2022-2025)
- DIA (2020-2022)
- Lee Han-gyul (2016-2026)

== Filmography ==
- My Teenage Girl (2021–2022)
- Fantasy Boys (2023)
