= List of songs recorded by Pentagon =

This is a complete list of songs by South Korean boy group Pentagon.

Key
†	Single
	Pre-release single
•	Song available in Korean and Japanese
‡	2020 Japanese Version Available

== 0–9 ==
Song	Writer			Album	Year	Language	Ref.
Song	Lyrics	Composition	Arrangement	Album	Year	Language	Ref.
"& You"	Kotaro Egami	Kotaro Egami; Masayuki Tabuchi	–	Cosmo	2019	Japanese	
"10s And" (10초 전)	Hui; Wooseok	Hui; Wooseok chAN's; DARM	chAN's; DARM	Love or Take	2021	Korean	
"1+1"	Jo Yoon-gyung; Wooseok	LDN Noise; Cazzi Opeia; Gabriel Brandes	LDN Noise	Love or Take	2021	Korean	

== A ==
Song	Writer			Album	Year	Language	Ref.
Song	Lyrics	Composition	Arrangement	Album	Year	Language	Ref.
"All Right"	Son Young-jin; Jinho; E'Dawn; Yuto; Wooseok	Son Young-jin; Jinho	Son Young-jin	Demo_02	2017	Korean	
"Alien"	Hui; Shinwon; Yuto; Wooseok; The Proof	Hui; The Proof	The Proof	Genie:us	2019	Korean	
"Asteroid"	Lee Seu-ran; Wooseok	Andrew Choi; Coach & Sendo minGtion; Oh Seung-eun; Andreas Baertels	minGtion	Universe: The Black Hall	2020	Korean	

== B ==
Song	Writer			Album	Year	Language	Ref.
Song	Lyrics	Composition	Arrangement	Album	Year	Language	Ref.
"Beautiful" •	Jung Il-hoon; IL	Jung Il-hoon; IL		Ceremony	2017	Korean	
"Beautiful" •	–	Jung Il-hoon; IL		Violet	2018	Japanese	
"Burnin' Love"	–	–	–	Violet	2018	Japanese	
"Beautiful Goodbye"	Kino; Wooseok	Kino; Nathan; HoHo	Nathan; HoHo	We:th	2020	Korean	
"Baby I Love You"	Kino; Wooseok	Kino; Nathan; HoHo	Nathan; HoHo	Love or Take	2021	Korean	
"Boy In Time (Hui solo)" (소년감성)	Hui	Hui	Hong So-jin	Love or Take	2021	Korean	
"Boy In Time (Hui solo)" (소년감성)	Hui; Ryuji Fujita; Aki Fujita	Hui	Hong So-jin	Do or Not	2021	Japanese	
"Bad"	Wooseok	Wooseok; Siixk Jun	Siixk Jun	In:vite U	2022	Korean	
"Billie Jean"	Jinho; Kaito Akatsuka	Jinho; Ryan Bickley	Freedo	Pado	2023	Japanese	

== C ==
Song	Writer			Album	Year	Language	Ref.
Song	Lyrics	Composition	Arrangement	Album	Year	Language	Ref.
"Can You Feel It" (감이 오지) † • ‡	Son Young-jin; Ferdy	Son Young-jin; Ferdy		Five Senses	2016	Korean	
"Can You Feel It" (감이 오지) † • ‡	Son Young-jin; Ferdy; Samuelle Soung	Son Young-jin; Ferdy		Gorilla	2017	Japanese	
"Can You Feel It" (감이 오지) † • ‡	Son Young-jin; Ferdy; Samuelle Soung	Son Young-jin; Ferdy		Universe: The History	2020	Japanese	
"Critical Beauty" (예뻐죽겠네) †	Park Woo-hyun	Olivier 'Akos' Castelli; Justin Stein	Olivier 'Akos' Castelli	Ceremony	2017	Korean	
"Can't Forget" (忘れられない)	Ryuji Fujita	JayJay; Jinho	–	Shine	2018	Japanese	
"Cosmo" †	Teru; Yuto	Teru	–	Cosmo	2019	Japanese	
"Camellia" (동백꽃)	Yuto; Wooseok; FCMHoudini	FCMHoudini; Yuto; FCMRimbaud		Universe: The Black Hall	2020	Korean	
"Call My Name"	Kino; HAEE; Wooseok	Kino; Kim Zion; Milano	Kim Zion; Son Yo-sep; Hyeogdu Choi	In:vite U	2022	Korean	

== D ==
Song	Writer			Album	Year	Language	Ref.
Song	Lyrics	Composition	Arrangement	Album	Year	Language	Ref.
"Do It for Fun" (재밌겠다) (Rap unit)	E'Dawn; Wooseok; Yuto	E'Dawn; Kang Dong-Ha		Positive	2018	Korean	
"Dear Friend"	Tokimakers	Yoshie Isogai	–	Cosmo	2019	Japanese	
"Die For You"	Kino; Nathan; Wooseok	Kino; Nathan	Nathan	Universe: The Black Hall	2020	Korean	
"Dr. Bebe" (Dr. 베베) †•	Hui; Wooseok	Hui; Nathan; Yunji	Nathan; Yunji	Universe: The Black Hall	2020	Korean	
"Dr. Bebe" (Dr. 베베) †•	Hui; Wooseok; Shōko Fujibayashi	Hui; Nathan; Yunji	Nathan; Yunji	Universe: The History	2020	Japanese	
"Daisy" (데이지) †•	Hui; Wooseok	Hui; Nathan; Wooseok	Nathan; Yunji	We:th	2020	Korean	
"Daisy" (데이지) †•	Hui; Wooseok; ZKING	Hui; Nathan; Wooseok	Nathan; Yunji	Digital Single	2020	Chinese	
"Daisy" (데이지) †•	Hui; Wooseok; Shōko Fujibayashi	Hui; Nathan; Wooseok	Nathan; Yunji	Do or Not (Note: The Japanese version of "Daisy" was released as a digital single in 2020 alongside the Chinese version, and was later included in the 2021 EP Do or Not.)	2020	Japanese	
"Do or Not" †	Hui; Wooseok	Hui; Nathan; Wooseok	Nathan	Love or Take	2021	Korean	
"Do or Not" †	Hui; Wooseok; Gabriel Brandes	Hui; Nathan; Wooseok	Nathan	Digital Single	2021	English	
"Do or Not" †	Hui; Wooseok; Arys Chien	Hui; Nathan; Wooseok	Nathan	Digital Single	2021	Chinese	
"Do or Not" †	Hui; Wooseok; Shoko Fujibayashi	Hui; Nathan; Wooseok	Nathan	Do or Not	2021	Japanese	
"Don't Worry 'Bout Me"	Kino; Yuto; Wooseok; Shoko Fujibayashi	Kino; Nathan	Nathan	Do or Not	2021	Japanese	
"Dazzling" (眩しい君と)	Yuto; Houdini; KushitaMine	Houdini; Yuto		Do or Not	2021	Japanese	
"Don't"	Kino; Wooseok; Kaito Akatsuka	Kino; Wooseok; Kim Zion; Gayeoni	Kim Zion; Yo Seb Son	Feelin' Like	2022	Japanese	

== E ==
Song	Writer			Album	Year	Language	Ref.
Song	Lyrics	Composition	Arrangement	Album	Year	Language	Ref.
"Engine"	Ferdy; Kang Dong-ha; Wooseok; Yuto	Ferdy; Kang Dong-ha		Five Senses	2016	Korean	
"Eternal Flame" † (불꽃)	Kino; Wooseok; Yuto; Universe	Kino; Nathan	Nathan	Digital Single	2020	Korean	

== F ==
Song	Writer			Album	Year	Language	Ref.
Song	Lyrics	Composition	Arrangement	Album	Year	Language	Ref.
"Fantasytic" (판타지스틱)	Hui; Wooseok	Giriboy; Minit; Hui	Giriboy; Minit	Sum(me:r)	2019	Korean	
"Feelin' Like" † •	HAEE; Kino; Jinho; Wooseok	Ryan S. Jhun; Kristin Marie; Vegard Hurum; Jop Pangemanan	Ryan S. Jhun; Vegard Hurum	In:vite U	2022	Korean	
"Feelin' Like" † •	HAEE; Kino; Jinho; Wooseok; Riho Okano	Ryan S. Jhun; Kristin Marie; Vegard Hurum; Jop Pangemanan	Ryan S. Jhun; Vegard Hurum	Feelin' Like	2022	Japanese	

== G ==
Song	Writer			Album	Year	Language	Ref.
Song	Lyrics	Composition	Arrangement	Album	Year	Language	Ref.
"Gorilla" † • ‡	Seo Ji-eum	Gavin Jones; Ali Zackowski; Harry Sommerdahl		Pentagon	2016	Korean	
"Gorilla" † • ‡	Seo Ji-eum; Samuelle Soung; Yuto	Gavin Jones; Ali Zackowski; Harry Sommerdahl		Gorilla	2017	Japanese	
"Gorilla" † • ‡	–	Gavin Jones; Ali Zackowski; Harry Sommerdahl		Pentagon (Note: The Chinese version of "Gorilla" was released exclusively on the 2017 Asian Edition of Pentagon.)	2017	Chinese	
"Gorilla" † • ‡	Seo Ji-eum; Samuelle Soung; Yuto	Gavin Jones; Ali Zackowski; Harry Sommerdahl		Universe: The History	2020	Japanese	
"Get Down"	Samuelle Soung	Steven Staycock	–	Gorilla	2017	Japanese	
"Get That Drink" (멋있게랩)	E'Dawn; Yuto; Wooseok		E'Dawn	Demo_01	2017	Korean	

== H ==
Song	Writer			Album	Year	Language	Ref.
Song	Lyrics	Composition	Arrangement	Album	Year	Language	Ref.
"Hikari" (光)	Gizmo; ArmySlick		–	Gorilla	2017	Japanese	
"Hey! Hey! Hey!"	JayJay; E'Dawn; Yuto	JayJay; E'Dawn	–	Shine	2018	Japanese	
"Happiness" † •	Kino; Yuto; KushitaMine	Kino; Benefits all Humankind; MetDoeJi	Benefits all Humankind; MetDoeJi; Gayeoni	Happiness/Sha La La	2019	Japanese	
"Happiness" † •	Kino; Yuto; Wooseok	Kino; Benefits all Humankind; MetDoeJi	Benefits all Humankind; MetDoeJi; Gayeoni	Universe: The Black Hall	2020	Korean	
"Humph!" (접근금지) Prod. by Giriboy †•	Hui; Giriboy; Wooseok	Giriboy; Hui	Giriboy	Sum(me:r)	2019	Korean	
"Humph!" (접근금지) Prod. by Giriboy †•	Hui; Giriboy; Wooseok; Shōko Fujibayashi	Giriboy; Hui	Giriboy	Universe: The History	2020	Japanese	

== I ==
Song	Writer			Album	Year	Language	Ref.
Song	Lyrics	Composition	Arrangement	Album	Year	Language	Ref.
"It's Over"	Kino; E'Dawn; Wooseok	Kino	Ferdy; Kino	Demo_01	2017	Korean	
"I'm Fine"	Hui; Yuto; E'Dawn; Wooseok	JayJay; Hui	–	Shine	2018	Japanese	
"I’m Here" (Jinho solo)	Jinho		Nathan; Jun.p	We:th (Note: "I'm Here" is only available on the physical versions of We:th.)	2020	Korean	

== J ==
Song	Writer			Album	Year	Language	Ref.
Song	Lyrics	Composition	Arrangement	Album	Year	Language	Ref.
"Just Do It Yo" (저두요)	Hui; Shinwon; Kino; Yuto; Wooseok	Hui; Shinwon; Ferdy (MosPick)	Ferdy (MosPick)	Thumbs Up!	2019	Korean	

== L ==
Song	Writer			Album	Year	Language	Ref.
Song	Lyrics	Composition	Arrangement	Album	Year	Language	Ref.
"Lukewarm" (미지근해)	Kang Dong-ha; E'Dawn; Wooseok	Ferdy		Pentagon	2016	Korean	
"Lose Yourself" (풀러)	Son Young-jin; Jo Sung-ho; Ferdy; E'Dawn	Son Young-jin; Jo Sung-ho; Ferdy		Five Senses	2016	Korean	
"Lucky"	Roydo; Shin Kong; BreadBeat	Shin Kong; BreadBeat		Ceremony	2017	Korean	
"Like This" †	Hui; E'Dawn; Yuto; Wooseok	Flow Blow; Hui	Flow Blow	Demo_01	2017	Korean	
"Love"	–	–	–	Violet	2018	Japanese	
"Let's Go Together" (함께 가자 우리)	Kang Dong-Ha; E'Dawn; Wooseok	Kang Dong-Ha; E'Dawn	Kang Dong-Ha	Positive	2018	Korean	
"Lost Paradise" (Hip Hop Unit)	Hui; Yuto; Kino; Wooseok	Hui; Yuto; Kino; Wooseok; Nathan	Nathan	Genie:us	2019	Korean	
"Loop (L∞P)"	Kino; Nathan; Wooseok; Aska Tsuchiya	Kino; Wooseok; Nathan; Yunji	Nathan; Yunji	Pado	2023	Japanese	

== M ==
Song	Writer			Album	Year	Language	Ref.
Song	Lyrics	Composition	Arrangement	Album	Year	Language	Ref.
"Mr. Wolf"	Jinho; Wooseok; Furuta	Jinho; SNNNY	SNNNY	Feelin' Like	2022	Japanese	
"Made in Heaven"	Jinho; Wooseok; Yuto; Kaito Akatsuka	Kino; Nathan; Hoho	Nathan; Hoho	Pado	2023	Japanese	

== N ==
Song	Writer			Album	Year	Language	Ref.
Song	Lyrics	Composition	Arrangement	Album	Year	Language	Ref.
"Nothing"	Seo Jae-woo; Kang Dong-ha; Ra Young-ssi; Yuto; E'Dawn; Wooseok	Seo Jae-woo; Kang Dong-ha		Ceremony	2017	Korean	
"Nothing I Can Do" (보낼 수밖에)	Son Young-jin; Jo Sung-ho; E'Dawn; Wooseok	Son Young-jin; Jo Sung-ho		Positive	2018	Korean	
"Nightmare -Wake Up-" (悪夢-wake up-)	Yuto; Yocke	Ferdy; Kino	–	Shine	2018	Japanese	
"Naughty Boy" (청개구리) † •	E'Dawn; Hui; Yuto; Wooseok	Flow Blow; Hui; E'Dawn	Flow Blow	Thumbs Up!	2018	Korean	
"Naughty Boy" (청개구리) † •	E'Dawn; Hui; Yuto; Wooseok; Shōko Fujibayashi	Flow Blow; Hui; E'Dawn	Flow Blow	Cosmo (Note: The Japanese version of "Naughty Boy" was released on the iTunes edition of Pentagon's 2019 single album Cosmo. It was later included in their 2020 album Universe: The History.)	2019	Japanese	
"Nostalgia" (그해 그달 그날)	Wooseok	MosPick; Wooseok	MosPick	We:th	2020	Korean	

== O ==
Song	Writer			Album	Year	Language	Ref.
Song	Lyrics	Composition	Arrangement	Album	Year	Language	Ref.
"Organic Song" (귀 좀 막아줘) (sung by E'Dawn, Yuto, Wooseok, Hui)	E'Dawn; Wooseok	E'Dawn; Hui	Big Sancho	Pentagon	2016	Korean	
"One More Night" (오늘까지만)	Ferdy; Jinho; E'Dawn; Yuto; Wooseok	Ferdy; Jinho	Jinho	Demo_01	2017	Korean	
"Off-Road" •	Kino; E'Dawn; Yuto; Wooseok	Kang Dong-ha; Kino	Kang Dong-ha	Positive	2018	Korean	
"Off-Road" •	E'Dawn; Yuto; Wooseok; Mion Yano	Kang Dong-ha; Kino	Kang Dong-ha	Shine	2018	Japanese	
"One Shot" (한탕)	Wooseok; Shinwon	Wooseok; Nathan; Shinwon	NATHAN; MILLENIUM	In:vite U	2022	Korean	

== P ==
Song	Writer			Album	Year	Language	Ref.
Song	Lyrics	Composition	Arrangement	Album	Year	Language	Ref.
"Pentagon"	Big Sancho; Jo Sung-ho			Pentagon	2016	Korean	
"Pretty Pretty" (예쁨) • ‡	Seo Ji-eum	Daniel Caesar; Ludwig Lindell		Five Senses	2017	Korean	
"Pretty Pretty" (예쁨) • ‡	Seo Ji-eum; Yu-ki Kokubo	Daniel Caesar; Ludwig Lindell		Gorilla	2017	Japanese	
"Pretty Pretty" (예쁨) • ‡	Seo Ji-eum; Yu-ki Kokubo	Daniel Caesar; Ludwig Lindell		Universe: The History	2020	Japanese	
"Pretty Boys" (Rap unit)	E'Dawn; Wooseok; Yuto		Big Sancho; E'Dawn	Demo_01	2017	Korean	
"Paradise" (Paradise (별이 빛나는 이 밤))	Kino; Wooseok	Kino; MosPick	MosPick	We:th	2020	Korean	
"Pado (Wave to Me)"	Kino; Kaito Akatsuka	Kino; Nathan	Nathan	Pado	2023	Japanese	

== R ==
Song	Writer			Album	Year	Language	Ref.
Song	Lyrics	Composition	Arrangement	Album	Year	Language	Ref.
"Runaway" †	Hui; E'Dawn; Yuto; Wooseok	Flow Blow; Hui	Flow Blow	Demo_02	2017	Korean	
"Round 1"	Jinho; Hui; Hongseok; Shinwon; Yeo One; Yan An; Yuto; Kino; Wooseok	Jinho; Hui; Hongseok; Shinwon; Yeo One; Yan An; Yuto; Kino; Wooseok; MosPick	MosPick	Genie:us	2019	Korean	
"Round 2"	Jinho; Hui; Hongseok; Shinwon; Yeo One; Yan An; Yuto; Kino; Wooseok	Jinho; Hui; Hongseok; Shinwon; Yeo One; Yan An; Yuto; Kino; Wooseok; MosPick	MosPick	Sum(me:r)	2019	Korean	

== S ==
Song	Writer			Album	Year	Language	Ref.
Song	Lyrics	Composition	Arrangement	Album	Year	Language	Ref.
"Smile"	Mafly; Keyfly	Hyuk Shin; Delly Boi; Reone; Jayrah Gibson; DK	Delly Boi; Reone	Pentagon	2016	Korean	
"Stay Crazy" (정신 못 차려도 돼)	Ferdy; Kang Dong-ha; E'Dawn	Ferdy; Kang Dong-ha		Five Senses	2017	Korean	
"Spectacular" (스펙터클 해)	Son Young-jin; Jo Sung-ho; E'Dawn; Yuto; Wooseok	Son Young-jin; Jo Sung-ho		Ceremony	2017	Korean	
"Stay" (머물러줘) (Vocal unit)	Hui		Son Young-jin; Kang Dong-ha	Demo_02	2017	Korean	
"Shine" (빛나리) † • ‡	E'Dawn; Hui; Yuto; Wooseok	Flow Blow; Hui; E'Dawn	Flow Blow	Positive	2018	Korean	
"Shine" (빛나리) † • ‡	E'Dawn; Hui; Yuto; Wooseok; Shōko Fujibayashi	Flow Blow; Hui; E'Dawn	Flow Blow	Shine	2018	Japanese	
"Shine" (빛나리) † • ‡	E'Dawn; Hui; Yuto; Wooseok; Shōko Fujibayashi	Flow Blow; Hui; E'Dawn	Flow Blow	Universe: The History	2020	Japanese	
"Skateboard"	Kino; Wooseok; E'Dawn; Yuto	Kino; Nathan	Nathan	Thumbs Up!	2018	Korean	
"Sha La La" (신토불이) † •	Hui; Wooseok	Hui; Han Yo Han; Minit	Han Yo Han; Minit	Genie:us	2019	Korean	
"Sha La La" (신토불이) † •	Hui; Wooseok; Shōko Fujibayashi	Hui; Han Yo Han; Minit	Han Yo Han; Minit	Happiness/Sha La La	2019	Japanese	
"Seasons"	Yuto; Ryuji Fujita	Yuto; FCMHoudini; Rwam	FCMHoudini; Yuto	Happiness/Sha La La	2019	Japanese	
"Spring Snow" (봄눈) •	Kino; Yuto; Wooseok	Kino; Nathan; HoHo		Genie:us	2019	Korean	
"Spring Snow" (봄눈) •	–	Kino; Nathan; HoHo		Happiness/Sha La La (Note: The Japanese version of "Spring Snow" was exclusively released on the iTunes edition of Pentagon's 2019 single album Happiness/Sha La La.)	2019	Japanese	
"Summer!"	Jinho; Wooseok	Albin Nordqvist; Andreas Öberg		Sum(me:r)	2019	Korean	
"Shower of Rain"	Hui; Wooseok	Hui; Minit	Minit	Universe: The Black Hall	2020	Korean	
"Someday" (Song by Jinho and Hui) (Special)	IMAGES; POPKID			Universe: The Black Hall	2020	Korean	
"Sing-a-song" (노래해)	Hui; Wooseok	Hui; Wooseok chAN's	chAN's; Nomal (Party in my pool)	Love or Take	2021	Korean	
"Sparkling Night" • (관람차)	Kino; Wooseok	Kino; Roamer Doze	Roamer Doze	In:vite U	2022	Korean	
"Sparkling Night" • (관람차)	Kino; Wooseok; Furuta	Kino; Roamer Doze	Roamer Doze	Feelin' Like	2022	Japanese	
"Shh" (詩)	Kino; HAEE; Kaito Akatsuka	Kino; Nathan yunji	Nathan yunji	Digital Single	2023	Japanese	
"Shh" (詩) (Aug ver.)	Kino; HAEE; Kaito Akatsuka	Kino; Nathan yunji	Nathan yunji	Pado	2023	Japanese	

== T ==
Song	Writer			Album	Year	Language	Ref.
Song	Lyrics	Composition	Arrangement	Album	Year	Language	Ref.
"Thank You" (고마워) (Jinho, Hui)	Hui		Son Young-jin	Ceremony	2017	Korean	
"To Universe" (소중한 약속) •	Jinho; E'Dawn; Yuto; Wooseok	Ferdy; Jinho	Ferdy	Ceremony	2017	Korean	
"To Universe" (소중한 약속) •	Jinho; E'Dawn; Yuto; Wooseok; Ryuji Fujita	Ferdy; Jinho	Ferdy	Universe: The History	2020	Japanese	
"Think About You" (생각해)	Jinho; Kang Dong-ha; E'Dawn; Yuto; Wooseok	Kang Dong-ha; Jinho	Kang Dong-ha	Positive	2018	Korean	
"Thumbs Up!"	Hui; Wooseok	Hui; The Proof	The Proof	Thumbs Up!	2019	Korean	
"Till..." (그 순간 그때까지) (Ballad unit)	Hui	Hui; JAY JAY	JAY JAY	Genie:us	2019	Korean	
"Talk"	Jinho; Wooseok	Albin Nordqvist; Sebastian Lestapier; Adam Alexander		Universe: The Black Hall	2020	Korean	
"The Black Hall"	Hui	Hui; Flow Blow	Flow Blow	Universe: The Black Hall	2020	Korean	
"That's Me"	Hui; Wooseok	Hui; Wooseok chAN's; DARM	chAN's; DARM	Love or Take	2021	Korean	
"The Game"	Wooseok	Wooseok; Nathan yunji Hoho	Nathan yunji	In:vite U	2022	Korean	

== U ==
Song	Writer			Album	Year	Language	Ref.
Song	Lyrics	Composition	Arrangement	Album	Year	Language	Ref.
"Up! Up! Up!"	–	–	–	Violet	2018	Japanese	

== V ==
Song	Writer			Album	Year	Language	Ref.
Song	Lyrics	Composition	Arrangement	Album	Year	Language	Ref.
"Violet" † • ‡	Kino; E'Dawn; Yuto; Wooseok	Kino; Nathan	Nathan	Demo_02	2017	Korean	
"Violet" † • ‡	Kino; E'Dawn; Yuto; Wooseok; Yu Shimoji	Kino; Nathan	Nathan	Violet	2018	Japanese	
"Violet" † • ‡	Kino; E'Dawn; Yuto; Wooseok; Yu Shimoji	Kino; Nathan	Nathan	Universe: The History	2020	Japanese	

== W ==
Song	Writer			Album	Year	Language	Ref.
Song	Lyrics	Composition	Arrangement	Album	Year	Language	Ref.
"Wake Up" (intro)	Big Sancho; E'Dawn	Seo Jae-woo	Seo Jae-woo	Pentagon	2016	Korean	
"When I Was in Love" (설렘이라는건)	Hui; E'Dawn; Yuto; Wooseok	Hui	Son Young-jin; Kang Dong-ha	Demo_01	2017	Korean	
"Wake Up"	–	–	–	Violet	2018	Japanese	
"When It Rains in Night" (밤에 비가 내리면)	Kino; Wooseok; Yuto	Kino; MetDoeJi; Benefits all humankind	MetDoeJi; Benefits all humankind	Thumbs Up!	2019	Korean	
"Worship U"	Wooseok earattack	earattck Jimmy Claeson	earattack Larmook	Universe: The Black Hall	2020	Korean	
"With Universe" (약속)	Hui; Wooseok; Yuto	Hui; Wooseok; Siixk Jun; Krap	Siixk Jun; Krap	Digital Single	2023	Korean	

== Y ==
Song	Writer			Album	Year	Language	Ref.
Song	Lyrics	Composition	Arrangement	Album	Year	Language	Ref.
"You Are" (Jinho, Hui, Hongseok, Shinwon, Yeo One, Yan An, Kino) •	Hui	Hui	Big Sancho	Pentagon	2016	Korean	
"You Are" (Jinho, Hui, Hongseok, Shinwon, Yeo One, Yan An, Kino) •	–	Hui	Big Sancho	Gorilla	2017	Japanese	
"You Like"	Hui; Wooseok	Hui; Minit; Wooseok	Minit	We:th	2020	Korean	

== Z ==
Song	Writer			Album	Year	Language	Ref.
Song	Lyrics	Composition	Arrangement	Album	Year	Language	Ref.
"Zoom Up"	CODE 9 PURAVIDA		PURAVIDA	Universe: The Black Hall	2020	Korean	

== Other songs ==
Title	Artist(s)	Album	Year	Ref
"Young" (젊어)	Hui, Yeo One, Yuto, Kino and Wooseok	Young	2016	
"Find Me" (나를 찾아줘)	Jinho, Hongseok, E'Dawn, Shinwon and Yan An	Young	2016	
"Special Christmas"	Pentagon with Jang Hyun-seung, HyunA, Roh Ji Hoon, BTOB, CLC	2016 United Cube Project Part 1	2016	
"Happy Winter Song" (겨울이 반가운 이유)	Jinho and Hui	2016 United Cube Project Part 2	2016	
"Romance" (낭만)	Kino and Hongseok	—N/a	2017	
"Lift Off"	Wooseok feat. E'Dawn	—N/a	2017	
"Trust Me"	Yuto feat. Wooseok and E'Dawn	—N/a	2018	
"Upgrade"	Pentagon with HyunA, Jo Kwon, BTOB, CLC, Yoo Seon-ho, (G)I-dle	ONE	2018	
"Follow Your Dreams" (한걸음)	Pentagon with HyunA, Jo Kwon, BTOB, CLC, Yoo Seon-ho, (G)I-dle	ONE	2018	
"Young & One"	Pentagon with HyunA, Jo Kwon, BTOB, CLC, Yoo Seon-ho, (G)I-dle	ONE	2018	
"Mermaid"	Wooseok with Lee Min-hyuk, Peniel, Jung Il-hoon, Jang Ye-eun, and Soyeon	ONE	2018	
"This Stop Is"	Hui, Wooseok and YooA	Gaegasoo Producer: Streaming	2018	
"The Greatest Wall"	Hui and Kino	—N/a	2019	
"Miss U"	Jinho, Hui and Kino	On The Campus OST Part 1	2019	
"How Can I Do"	Jinho, Hui and Wooseok	Welcome to Waikiki 2 OST Part 4	2019	
"Genius"	Pentagon feat. Pentagon's fathers	—N/a	2019	
"Shout Out" (외쳐)	Jinho, Hui, Kino and Wooseok	Joseon Survival Period OST Part 4	2019	
"Greedy Woman" (욕심쟁이)	Pentagon	Immortal Songs: Singing the Legend - Kim Jin Ryong's beautiful songs loved by Korea	2019	
"La Di Da"	Hui and Kino	—N/a	2019	
"Way" (도 (道))	Pentagon	Two Yoo Project Sugar Man 3 Ep 1	2019	
"Gravity"	Jinho with Kino	—N/a	2019	
"I'm loving you"	Glay feat. Pentagon	REVIEW II 〜BEST OF GLAY〜	2020	
"Happiness" (Rock Ver.) Demo (도망가자)	Kino with Hui, Wooseok, and Yuto	—N/a	2020	
"I'm loving you" (Korean Ver.)	Glay feat. Pentagon	I'm loving you feat. PENTAGON (Korean Ver.)	2020	
"Very Good (Pentagon Ver.)"	Pentagon	Road to Kingdom - Song of King Part 2	2020	
"Shine + Spring Snow" (빛나리+봄눈)	Pentagon	Road to Kingdom - My Song Part 1	2020	
"Follow (Pentagon Ver.)"	Pentagon	Road to Kingdom - Your Song Part 2	2020	
"Basquiat" (바스키아)	Pentagon	Road to Kingdom - Road to Kingdom FINAL	2020	
"Twenty-Twenty"	Pentagon	Twenty-Twenty OST Part 1	2020	
"Love Rain" (사랑비)	Pentagon	Cheer Up, Korea! Celebrity Special Part 2: Park Se-ri	2020	
"Honey Drop"	Pentagon	Replay OST Part 1	2021	
"WTH"	Hui and Shinwon	—N/a	2021	
"Beautiful Goodbye" (Rock Ver.) Demo	Pentagon	—N/a	2021	
"Cerberus"	Pentagon (Yuto, Kino, Wooseok)	Digital Single	2021	
"A-HA!" (다른 우리)	Pentagon (Jinho and Kino)	User Not Found OST Part 2	2022	
"Naughty Boy" (개구장이)	Pentagon	Immortal Songs - Kim Chang-wan, Part 1	2022	
"Now or Never"	Kino with Wooseok and Jinho	—N/a	2022	
"Poppia" (Saudi Arabia Ver.)	Pentagon	KCON 2022 Saudi Arabia Signature Song	2022	
"Love is Pain" (결국)	Pentagon	Digital Single	2023	

== See also ==
- Pentagon discography
- List of songs written and produced by Jinho
- List of songs written and produced by Hui
- List of songs written and produced by Hongseok
- List of songs written and produced by Yeo One
- List of songs written and produced by Yuto
- List of songs written and produced by Kino
- List of songs written and produced by Wooseok
