= Pentagon discography =

Band discography

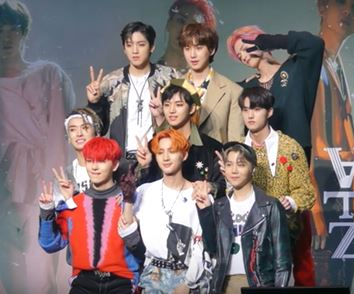
- Studio albums: 2
- EPs: 17
- Soundtrack albums: 4
- Singles: 19
- Music videos: 20

The discography of South Korean boy band Pentagon consists of two studio albums, eighteen extended plays and nineteen singles.

== Studio albums ==
List of studio albums, with selected details, chart positions and sales
Title	Details	Peak chart positions			Sales
Title	Details	KOR	JPN	JPN Hot	Sales
Universe: The Black Hall	Released: February 12, 2020 (KOR); Label: Cube Entertainment; Formats: CD, digital download	3	14	—	KOR: 66,040; JPN: 11,639 (Phy.)
Universe: The History	Released: September 23, 2020 (JPN); Label: Universal Music Japan; Formats: CD, digital download	—	7	8	JPN: 16,235 (Phy.)

== Extended plays ==
List of extended plays, with selected details, chart positions and sales
Title	Details	Peak chart positions				Sales
Title	Details	KOR	JPN	JPN Hot	US World	Sales
Pentagon	Released: October 10, 2016 (KOR); Label: Cube Entertainment; Formats: CD, digital download	7	—	—	—	KOR: 19,772
Five Senses	Released: December 7, 2016 (KOR); Label: Cube Entertainment; Formats: CD, digital download	5	—	—	—	KOR: 22,589
Gorilla	Released: March 29, 2017 (JPN); Label: Cube Entertainment Japan; Formats: CD, digital download	—	5	—	—	JPN: 14,487
Ceremony	Released: June 12, 2017 (KOR); Label: Cube Entertainment; Formats: CD, digital download	6	—	—	14	KOR: 23,111
Demo_01	Released: September 6, 2017 (KOR); Label: Cube Entertainment; Formats: CD, digital download	8	99	—	5	KOR: 13,875; JPN: 808
Demo_02	Released: November 22, 2017 (KOR); Label: Cube Entertainment; Formats: CD, digital download	8	—	—	—	KOR: 23,257
Violet	Released: January 17, 2018 (JPN); Label: Cube Entertainment Japan; Formats: CD, digital download	—	4	—	—	JPN: 21,918
Positive	Released: April 2, 2018 (KOR); Label: Cube Entertainment; Formats: CD, digital download	6	4	—	9	KOR: 52,488
Shine	Released: August 29, 2018 (JPN); Label: Cube Entertainment Japan; Formats: CD, digital download; Track listing: 1. Shine (Japanese ver.); 2. Off-Road (Japanese ver.); 3. I'm Fine; 4. Akumu – Wake Up – (悪夢 – wake up –); 5. Wasurerarenai (忘れられない); 6. Hey! Hey! Hey!; 7. Shine (빛나리) (Korean ver.)	—	4	5	—	JPN: 25,699
Thumbs Up!	Released: September 10, 2018 (KOR); Label: Cube Entertainment; Formats: CD, digital download	4	47	—	—	KOR: 34,851; JPN: 998
Genie:us	Released: March 27, 2019 (KOR); Label: Cube Entertainment; Formats: CD, digital download	5	—	—	15	KOR: 40,160
Sum(me:r)	Released: July 17, 2019 (KOR); Label: Cube Entertainment; Formats: CD, digital download	4	49	—	12	KOR: 35,881; JPN: 1,130 (Phy.)
We:th	Released: October 12, 2020 (KOR); Label: Cube Entertainment; Formats: CD, digital download	4	16	82	—	KOR: 110,479; JPN: 8,489
Love or Take	Released: March 15, 2021 (KOR); Label: Cube Entertainment; Formats: CD, digital download	3	15	87	—	KOR: 114,355; JPN: 9,054 (Phy.)
Do or Not	Released: June 14, 2021 (JPN); Label: Universal Music Japan; Formats: CD, digital download	—	12	10	—	JPN: 9,565 (Phy.)
In:vite U	Released: January 24, 2022 (KOR); Label: Cube Entertainment; Formats: CD, digital download	1	16	61	—	KOR: 102,281; JPN: 1,376 (Phy.)
Feelin' Like	Released: September 14, 2022 (JPN); Label: Universal Music Japan; Formats: CD, digital download; Track listing: 1. Feelin' Like (Japanese ver.); 2. Sparkling Night (Japanese ver.); 3. Don't; 4. Mr. Wolf; 5. Feelin' Like (Instrumental)	—	6	45	—	JPN: 6,768
Pado	Released: August 30, 2023 (JPN); Label: Universal Music Japan; Formats: CD, digital download; Track listing: 1. Pado (Wave to Me); 2. Loop (L∞P); 3. Shh (詩) (Aug ver.); 4. Billie Jean; 5. Made in Heaven	—	13	5	—	JPN: 10,519
"—" denotes releases that did not chart or were not released in that region.

== Singles ==
Title	Year	Peak chart positions					Sales	Album
Title	Year	KOR	KOR Hot	JPN	JPN Hot	US World	Sales	Album
Korean
"Gorilla"	2016	—	—	—	—	—	—N/a	Pentagon
"Can You Feel It" (감이 오지)	2016	—	—	—	—	—	—N/a	Five Senses
"Pretty Pretty" (예쁨)	2017	—	—	—	—	—	—N/a	Five Senses
"Beautiful"	2017	—	—	—	—	—	—N/a	Ceremony
"Critical Beauty" (예뻐죽겠네)	2017	—	—	—	—	—	—N/a	Ceremony
"Like This"	2017	—	—	—	—	—	—N/a	Demo_01
"Stay" (머물러줘)	2017	—	—	—	—	—	—N/a	Demo_02
"Runaway"	2017	—	—	—	—	—	—N/a	Demo_02
"Shine" (빛나리)	2018	27	24	—	—	6	US: 3,000+	Positive
"Naughty Boy" (청개구리)	2018	— (Note: "Naughty Boy" did not enter Gaon Digital Chart, but debuted and peaked at number 93 on Gaon Download Chart.)	—	—	—	7	—N/a	Thumbs Up!
"Sha La La" (신토불이)	2019	—	—	—	—	15	—N/a	Genie:us
"Humph!" (접근금지)	2019	—	—	—	—	—	—N/a	Sum(me:r)
"Dr. Bebe" (Dr. 베베)	2020	—	—	—	—	18	—N/a	Universe: The Black Hall
"Basquiat" (바스키아)	2020	— (Note: "Basquiat" did not enter Gaon Digital Chart, but debuted and peaked at number 23 on Gaon Download Chart.)	—	—	—	—	—N/a	Road to Kingdom Final
"Daisy" (데이지)	2020	111	—	—	—	—	—N/a	We:th
"Eternal Flame" (겁쟁이)	2020	— (Note: "Eternal Flame" did not enter Gaon Digital Chart, but debuted and peaked at number 144 on Gaon Download Chart.)	—	—	—	—	—N/a	Non-album single
"Do or Not"	2021	60	—	—	—	—	—N/a	Love or Take
"Feelin' Like"	2022	98	—	—	—	—	—N/a	In:vite U
"With Universe" (약속)	2023	— (Note: "With Universe" did not enter Circle Digital Chart, but debuted and peaked at number 77 on Circle Download Chart.)	—	—	—	—	—N/a	Non-album singles
"Coward" (겁쟁이)	2026	—	—	—	—	—	—N/a	Non-album singles
Japanese
"Gorilla"	2017	—	—	—	—	—	—N/a	Gorilla
"Violet"	2018	—	—	—	—	—	—N/a	Violet
"Shine"	2018	—	—	—	—	—	—N/a	Shine
"Cosmo"	2019	—	—	4	6	—	JPN: 52,812	Non-album singles
"Happiness"	2019	—	—	3	6	—	JPN: 60,831	Non-album singles
"Sha La La"	2019	—	—	3	6	—	JPN: 60,831	Non-album singles
"Dr. Bebe"	2020	—	—	—	—	—	—N/a	Universe: The History
"Daisy"	2020	—	—	—	—	—	—N/a	Do or Not
"Do or Not"	2021	—	—	—	—	—	—N/a	Do or Not
"Feelin' Like"	2022	—	—	—	—	—	—N/a	Feelin' Like
"Shh" (詩)	2023	—	—	—	—	—	—N/a	Non-album single
"Pado (Wave to Me)"	2023	—	—	—	—	—	—N/a	Pado
"—" denotes releases that did not chart or were not released in that region.

== Soundtracks ==
Title	Year	Album	Notes	Ref
"Organic Song" (귀 좀 막아줘)	2016	Spark OST Part 1	Later included in debut EP Pentagon	
"Miss U"	2019	On The Campus OST Part 1		
"How Can I Do"	2019	Welcome to Waikiki 2 OST Part 4		
"Shout Out" (외쳐)	2019	Joseon Survival Period OST Part 4		
"Twenty-Twenty"	2020	Twenty-Twenty OST Part 1		
"Honey Drop"	2021	Replay OST Part 1		

== Collaborations ==
Title	Year	Other artist(s)
"Special Christmas"	2016	Hyuna, Jang Hyun-seung, BtoB, Roh Ji-hoon, CLC
"Follow Your Dreams" (한걸음)	2018	Hyuna, Jo Kwon, BtoB, CLC, Yoo Seon-ho, (G)I-DLE
"Upgrade"	2018	Hyuna, Jo Kwon, BtoB, CLC, Yoo Seon-ho, (G)I-DLE
"Young & One"	2018	Hyuna, Jo Kwon, BtoB, CLC, Yoo Seon-ho, (G)I-DLE
"I'm loving you"	2020	Glay
"I'm loving you" (Korean Ver.)	2020	Glay

== Other songs ==
Title	Year	Format	Album	Notes	Ref.
"Young" (젊어)	2016	Digital download, streaming	Young	produced by Dok2 for Pentagon Maker	
"Find Me" (나를 찾아줘)	2016	Digital download, streaming	Young	produced by Tiger JK for Pentagon Maker	
"Greedy Woman" (욕심쟁이)	2019	Digital download, streaming	Immortal Songs: Singing the Legend - Kim Jin Ryong's beautiful songs loved by Korea	original song by Kim Jin Ryong	
"Way" (도 (道))	2019	Digital download, streaming	Two Yoo Project Sugar Man 3 Episode 1	original song by Taesaja	
"Very Good (Pentagon Ver.)"	2020	Digital download, streaming	Road to Kingdom - Song of King Part 2	original song by Block B	
"Shine + Spring Snow" (빛나리+봄눈)	2020	Digital download, streaming	Road to Kingdom - My Song Part 1		
"Follow (Pentagon Ver.)"	2020	Digital download, streaming	Road to Kingdom - Your Song Part 2	original song by Monsta X	
"Love Rain" (사랑비)	2020	Digital download, streaming	Immortal Songs: Singing the Legend - Kim Tae-woo	original song by Kim Tae-woo	
"Naughty Boy" (개구장이)	2022	Digital download, streaming	Immortal Songs - Artist Kim Chang-wan, Part 1	original song by Kim Chang-wan	

=== Unofficial original releases ===
All songs are part of Pentagon's project and credits are adapted from the Korea Music Copyright Association's database, unless otherwise noted.

Year	Artist	Song	Note
2017	Kino & Hongseok	"Romance (낭만)"	
2017	Yeo One	"Let's Go (토닥토닥)"	
2017	Wooseok ft. E'Dawn	"Lift Off"	
2018	Kino	"Lonely"	
2018	Yuto with Wooseok and E'Dawn	"Trust Me"	
2018	Yeo One	"Hope"	
2019	Hui & Kino	"The Greatest Wall"	
2019	Pentagon ft. Pentagon's fathers	"Genius"	
2019	Yeo One	"Her Voice"	
2019	Hui & Kino	"La Di Da"	
2019	Jinho & Kino	"Gravity"	
2021	Yeo One	"Begin Again"	

== Music videos ==
Title	Year	Director(s)	Ref.
Korean
"Young"	2016	Unknown	
"Gorilla"	2016	Vikings League	
"Can You Feel It"	2016	Vikings League	
"Pretty Pretty"	2017	Sparkling	
"Critical Beauty"	2017	Vikings League	
"To Universe"	2017	Unknown	
"When I Was in Love"	2017	Bpm 권진모	
"Like This"	2017	Flexible Pictures	
"Runaway"	2017	Flexible Pictures	
"Violet"	2017	Bpm 권진모	
"Shine"	2018	Flexible Pictures	
"Naughty Boy"	2018	Digipedi	
"Sha La La"	2019	Dee Shin	
"Humph!"	2019	Hong Won-ki (Zanybros)	
"Dr. Bebe"	2020	Hong Won-ki, Seo Hae-mi (Zanybros)	
"Daisy"	2020	Jang Jae-hyeok (BIBBIDI BOBBIDI BOO.)	
"Do or Not"	2021	Digipedi	
"Feelin' Like"	2022	Unknown	
Japanese
"Gorilla"	2017	Hong Won-ki (Zanybros)	
"Violet"	2018	Bpm 권진모	
"Shine"	2018	RIGEND FILM	
"Cosmo"	2019	Hong Won-ki (Zanybros)	
"Happiness"	2019	Hong Won-ki (Zanybros)	
"Sha La La"	2019	Heo Jin-hyun	

== See also ==
- List of songs recorded by Pentagon
- Pentagon videography
- Jinho discography
- Hui discography
- Hongseok discography
- Yan An discography
- Yeo One discography
- Yuto discography
- Kino discography
- Wooseok discography
