= List of songs written and produced by Hui =

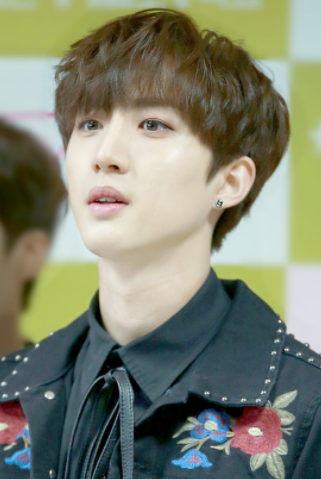
Hui at the Hanlim Multi Art School graduation on February 10, 2017.

Lee Hoe-taek (Hangul: 이회택; born August 28, 1993), better known by the mononym Hui (Hangul: 후이) is a South Korean singer, songwriter and composer. He debuted as the leader of the South Korean boy group Pentagon under Cube Entertainment. He was also a member of the co-ed trio Triple H from 2017 to 2018, and is the leader of the trot boy group Super Five.

Hui participates in writing and producing a majority of Pentagon's songs, most notably "Shine", "Naughty Boy", "Daisy", and "Do or Not". He produces songs for other artists as well, with some of his best-known works being Wanna One's "Energetic", Nation's Son's "Never", Produce X 101's "Boyness", and JO1's "Oh-Eh-Oh". As of April 2026, the Korea Music Copyright Association has 87 songs listed under his name.

All credits are adapted from the Korea Music Copyright Association, unless stated otherwise.

== Solo work ==
Year	Song	Featured artist	Album	Lyrics		Music	
Year	Song	Featured artist	Album	Credited	With	Credited	With
2017	"Wake Me Up"	Jo Woo-chan	The Hyena on the Keyboard	Yes	Jo Woo-chan	Yes	Flow Blow
2018	"Navigation"	—N/a	Breakers Part 3	Yes	—N/a	Yes	The Proof
2018	"Bodyguard" (보디가드)	—N/a	Breakers Part 5	Yes	—N/a	Yes	The Proof
2018	"Swim Good"	Somin	Breakers Semi Final	Yes	—N/a	Yes	The Proof
2018	"For You"	—N/a	Breakers Final	Yes	—N/a	Yes	The Proof
2018	"This Stop Is"	YooA, Wooseok	Comedian Singer Composer	Yes	Hyungdon, Wooseok	Yes	The Proof
2019	"The Greatest Wall"	Kino	—N/a	Yes	Kino	Yes	Kino, Gayeoni
2019	"Lift Trophy" (수상소감)	Hangzoo	The Call 2 Fifth Project	Yes	Hangzoo	Yes	Hangzoo, Padi
2019	"TicToc" (똑딱)	Kino	—N/a	Yes	Kino	Yes	Kino
2020	"Masquerade" (가장 무도회)	—N/a	Lotto Singer Episode 7	No	—N/a	Yes	Son Mu-hyeon, yunji
2021	"WTH"	Shinwon	—N/a	Yes	Shinwon	Yes	Shinwon, Minit, Chiic
2022	"Seoul"	—N/a	—N/a	Yes	—N/a	Yes	—N/a
2022	"Dish"	—N/a	—N/a	Yes	—N/a	Yes	—N/a
2023	"Oasis"	Wooseok	Unreleased song	Yes	Wooseok	Yes	Siixk Jun, Woosek, Krap
2024	"Hmm Bop" (흠뻑)	—N/a	Whu Is Me: Complex	Yes	JAJAY, Park Woojeong, Muzzle Hanjisusu	Yes	JAJAY, Park Woojeong, Muzzle Hanjisusu, BlackDoe, Adile
2024	"Melo"	Park Hyeon-jin	Whu Is Me: Complex	Yes	Wooseok, Park Hyeon-jin	Yes	Wooseok, Park Hyeon-jin, Park Seong-ho, Jo Kang-hyun
2024	"Cold Killer"	Jinhyuk	Whu Is Me: Complex	Yes	Wooseok	Yes	Wooseok, Park Seong-ho, Jo Kang-hyun
2024	"A Song From A Dream"	Wooseok	Whu Is Me: Complex	Yes	Wooseok	Yes	Wooseok, Minit
2024	"Paint" (덧칠)	—N/a	Disk Defragmenter (Note: Uploaded to YouTube in a series called "Disk Defragmenter")	Yes	—N/a	Yes	—N/a
2024	"Ghost Town"	—N/a	Disk Defragmenter	Yes	Muzzle Hanjisusu	Yes	Muzzle Hanjisusu
2024	"Crazy Joke" (미친 장난)	—N/a	Disk Defragmenter	Yes	Muzzle Hanjisusu	Yes	Muzzle Hanjisusu
2024	"Burnin'"	Wooseok	Disk Defragmenter	Yes	Muzzle Hanjisusu, Wooseok	Yes	Muzzle Hanjisusu, Wooseok
2024	"Welcome + (To The) Jungle"	—N/a	Disk Defragmenter	Yes	Muzzle Hanjisusu	Yes	Muzzle Hanjisusu
2024	"Easy Dance"	Kwon Eun-bi	Digital single	Yes	Wooseok, JayJay, Park Woo-jung	Yes	Wooseok, JayJay, Park Woo-jung
2024	"Nail" (손톱)	—N/a	Disk Defragmenter	Yes	—N/a	Yes	Kwak Jae-young
2024	"Black Out"	—N/a	Disk Defragmenter	Yes	Muzzle Hanjisusu	Yes	Muzzle Hanjisusu
2024	"Nameless" (잡초)	Jang Hye-jin	Digital single	Yes	—N/a	Yes	Krap, Cheatkey
2024	"Home Alone" (나 홀로 집에)	Hanhae	Whu Is Kevin	Yes	Hanhae, Muzzle Hanjisusu	Yes	Siixk Jun, Cheatkey, Krap, Muzzle Hanjisusu, Hanhae
2024	"Spring in the Winter" (겨울의 봄)	—N/a	Whu Is Kevin	Yes	—N/a	Yes	Jang Hye-seong
2025	"Promise You" (눈물 나게)	—N/a	Digital single	Yes	—N/a	Yes	The Proof, Siixk Jun
2025	"Refresh"	—N/a	—N/a	Yes	—N/a	Yes	Krap, Jang Hye-seong

== Pentagon albums/singles ==
Year	Song	Album	Lyrics		Music	
Year	Song	Album	Credited	With	Credited	With
2016	"Organic Song" (귀 좀 막아줘)	Pentagon	No	—N/a	Yes	E'Dawn, Big Sancho
2016	"You Are"	Pentagon	Yes	—N/a	Yes	Big Sancho
2017	"You Are" (Japanese ver.)	Gorilla	Yes	Risa Horie	Yes	Big Sancho
2017	"Thank You" (고마워)	Ceremony	Yes	—N/a	Yes	Son Young-jin, Kang Dongha
2017	"**Like This"**	Demo_01	Yes	E'Dawn, Yuto, Wooseok	Yes	Flow Blow
2017	"When I Was in Love" (설렘이라는건)	Demo_01	Yes	E'Dawn, Yuto, Wooseok	Yes	Son Young-jin, Kang Dongha
2017	**"Runaway"**	Demo_02	Yes	E'Dawn, Yuto, Wooseok	Yes	Flow Blow
2017	"Stay" (머물러줘)	Demo_02	Yes	—N/a	Yes	Son Young-jin, Kang Dongha
2018	"**Shine" (빛나리)**	Positive	Yes	E'Dawn, Yuto, Wooseok	Yes	Flow Blow, E'Dawn
2018	**"Shine" (Japanese ver.)**	Shine	Yes	E'Dawn, Yuto, Wooseok, Shōko Fujibayashi	Yes	Flow Blow, E'Dawn
2018	"I'm Fine"	Shine	Yes	E'Dawn, Yuto, Wooseok	Yes	JAY JAY
2018	"**Naughty Boy" (청개구리)**	Thumbs Up!	Yes	E'Dawn, Yuto, Wooseok	Yes	Flow Blow, E'Dawn
2018	"Just Do It Yo" (저두요)	Thumbs Up!	Yes	Shinwon, Kino, Yuto, Wooseok	Yes	Shinwon, Ferdy (MosPick)
2018	"Thumbs Up"	Thumbs Up!	Yes	Wooseok	Yes	The Proof
2019	"Naughty Boy" (Japanese ver.)	Cosmo	Yes	E'Dawn, Yuto, Wooseok, Shōko Fujibayashi	Yes	Flow Blow, E'Dawn
2019	"**Sha La La" (신토불이)**	Genie:us	Yes	Wooseok	Yes	Han Yo Han, Minit
2019	"Lost Paradise" (Hip Hop Unit)	Genie:us	Yes	Yuto, Kino, Wooseok	Yes	Yuto, Kino, Wooseok, Nathan
2019	"Till..." (Ballad Unit) (그 순간 그때까지)	Genie:us	Yes	—N/a	Yes	JAY JAY
2019	"Alien" (에일리언)	Genie:us	Yes	Shinwon, Yuto, Wooseok	Yes	The Proof
2019	"Round 1"	Genie:us	Yes	Jinho, Hongseok, Shinwon, Yeo One, Yan An, Yuto, Kino, Wooseok	Yes	Jinho, Hongseok, Shinwon, Yeo One, Yan An, Yuto, Kino, Wooseok, Mospick
2019	"**Humph" (접근금지) (Prod. by Giriboy)**	Sum(me:r)	Yes	Giriboy, Wooseok	Yes	Giriboy
2019	"Fantasytic" (판타지스틱) (Prod. by Giriboy)	Sum(me:r)	Yes	Wooseok	Yes	Giriboy, Minit
2019	"Round 2"	Sum(me:r)	Yes	Jinho, Hongseok, Shinwon, Yeo One, Yan An, Yuto, Kino, Wooseok	Yes	Jinho, Hongseok, Shinwon, Yeo One, Yan An, Yuto, Kino, Wooseok, Mospick
2019	**"Sha La La" (Japanese ver.)**	Happiness / Sha La La	Yes	Wooseok, Shōko Fujibayashi	Yes	Han Yo-han, Minit
2020	"**Dr. Bebe" (Dr. 베베)**	Universe: The Black Hall	Yes	Wooseok	Yes	Nathan, yunji
2020	"Shower of Rain" (빗물샤워)	Universe: The Black Hall	Yes	Wooseok	Yes	Minit
2020	"The Black Hall"	Universe: The Black Hall	Yes	Wooseok	Yes	Flow Blow
2020	"Shine" (2020 Japanese ver.)	Universe: The History	Yes	E'Dawn, Wooseok, Yuto, Shōko Fujibayashi	Yes	Flow Blow, E'Dawn
2020	"Humph!" (Japanese ver.)	Universe: The History	Yes	Giriboy, Shōko Fujibayashi	Yes	Giriboy
2020	"**Dr. Bebe" (Japanese ver.)**	Universe: The History	Yes	Wooseok, Shōko Fujibayashi	Yes	Nathan, yunji
2020	"**Daisy" (데이지)**	We:th	Yes	Wooseok	Yes	Nathan, Wooseok
2020	"You Like"	We:th	Yes	Wooseok	Yes	Minit, Wooseok
2020	"Daisy" (Japanese ver.)	Do or Not	Yes	Wooseok, Shōko Fujibayashi	Yes	Nathan, Wooseok
2020	"Daisy" (Chinese ver.)	Digital single	Yes	Wooseok, Z KING	Yes	Nathan, Wooseok
2021	"10s and" (10초 전)	Love or Take	Yes	Wooseok	Yes	Wooseok, chAN's, DARM
2021	**"Do or Not"**	Love or Take	Yes	Wooseok	Yes	Nathan, Wooseok
2021	"That's Me"	Love or Take	Yes	Wooseok	Yes	Wooseok, chAN's, DARM
2021	"Sing-a-song" (노래해)	Love or Take	Yes	Wooseok	Yes	Wooseok, chAN's, Nomal (Party in my pool)
2021	"Boy In Time" (소년감성) ((Hui solo) [Bonus Track])	Love or Take	Yes	—N/a	Yes	Hong So-jin
2021	"Do or Not" (English ver.)	Digital single	Yes	Wooseok, Gabriel Brandes	Yes	Nathan, Wooseok
2021	"Do or Not" (Chinese ver.)	Digital single	Yes	Wooseok, Arys Chien	Yes	Nathan, Wooseok
2021	**"Do or Not" (Japanese ver.)**	Do or Not	Yes	Wooseok, Shoko Fujibayashi	Yes	Nathan, Wooseok
2021	"Boy In Time" (Hui solo Japanese version)	Do or Not	Yes	Ryuji Fujita, Aki Fujita	Yes	Hong So-jin
2023	"With Universe" (약속)	Digital single	Yes	Wooseok, Yuto	Yes	Siixk Jun, Wooseok, Krap
**Bold** denotes title track.

== Other works by Pentagon ==
Year	Song	Album	Lyrics		Music	
Year	Song	Album	Credited	With	Credited	With
2016	**"Young" (젊어) (Prod. by Dok2)** **(Hui, Yeo One, Kino, Yuto, Wooseok)**	Digital single	Yes	Yeo One, Kino, Yuto, Wooseok	Yes	Yeo One, Kino, Yuto, Wooseok, Dok2
2019	"Genius" ft. Pentagon's Dads	—N/a	Yes	Shinwon, Yuto, Kino, Wooseok	Yes	Shinwon, Siixk Jun
2019	"Way" (도 (道))	Two Yoo Project Sugar Man 3 Ep 1	No	—N/a	Yes	Jang Yong-jin, MosPick
2020	"Very Good (Pentagon Ver.)"	Road to Kingdom Song of King Part 2	Yes	Zico, Wooseok	Yes	Zico, Pop Time, Minit, Chiic
2020	"Shine + Spring Snow" (빛나리+봄눈)	Road to Kingdom My Song Part 1	Yes	Dawn, Yuto, Wooseok, Kino	Yes	Flow Blow, Dawn, Kino, Nathan, HoHo, Minit
2020	"Follow (Pentagon Ver.)"	Road to Kingdom Your Song Part 2	No	—N/a	Yes	Daniel Kim, Willie Weeks, Andreas Öberg, Skylar Mones, Minit
2020	**"Basquiat" (바스키아)**	Road to Kingdom FINAL	Yes	Wooseok	Yes	Nathan, Wooseok, yunji
**Bold** denotes title track.

== Other artists ==
Year	Song	Artist	Album	Lyrics		Music	
Year	Song	Artist	Album	Credited	With	Credited	With
2017	"Sunflower" (바라기)	Triple H	199X	Yes	Hyuna, E'Dawn, Kang Dong-ha	No	—N/a
2017	"Never"	Nation's Son	35 Boys 5 Concepts	Yes	E'Dawn, Wooseok	Yes	Flow Blow
2017	**"Energetic" (에너제틱)**	Wanna One	1X1=1 (To Be One)	Yes	Wooseok	Yes	Flow Blow
2017	"Energetic" (에너제틱) (Prequel Remix)	Wanna One	1-1=0 (Nothing Without You)	Yes	Wooseok	Yes	Flow Blow
2018	**"Like Paradise" (Prod. Flow Blow)**	Kriesha Chu	Dream of Paradise	Yes	Flow Blow	Yes	Flow Blow
2018	"Don't Leave Me" (떠나가지마요)	Shinhwa	Heart	Yes	Zero Zine (Mospick), Jo Seongho (YeahNice)	Yes	Zero Zine (Mospick), Jo Seongho (YeahNice)
2019	**"Dramatic" (드라마틱)**	Bvndit	Digital single	Yes	Flow Blow, The Proof	Yes	Flow Blow, The Proof
2019	"Heart Sign"	Ong Seong-wu	Digital single	Yes	Wooseok, Flow Blow	Yes	Flow Blow
2019	"Boyness" (소년미)	Produce X 101	Produce X – Final	Yes	—N/a	Yes	Flow Blow
2019	"Cassette Tape" (카세트 테이프)	Soyou, Parc Jae-jung	The Call 2 Fourth Project	Yes	MosPick	Yes	MosPick, Park Woo-jung
2019	"119"	VAV	Poison	Yes	Ayno	Yes	The Proof
2020	"Shout" (소리쳐) (ft. Hui)	Han Yo-han	Spirit Bomb	Yes	Han Yo-han	Yes	Han Yo-han, Minit
2020	**"All Eyes on Me" (시선고정)**	Super Five	Digital single	Yes	혼수상태, 알고보니	No	—N/a
2020	**"Oh-Eh-Oh"**	JO1	Stargazer	Yes	Ellie Love	Yes	Minit, AirAir
2020	**"Twilight"**	WEi	Identity: First Sight	Yes	Flow Blow, Jang Dae-hyeon	Yes	Flow Blow
2020	"Boyness" (少年美)	TNT	少年江湖	Yes	可心	Yes	Flow Blow, M.W. Pluto
2021	**"White Butterfly" (하얀 나비)**	Kim Han-byul	Cap-Teen Top7	Yes	—N/a	Yes	The Proof, whyminsu
2021	"Tesseract" (Prod. Hui, Minit)	CIX	Promotional single	Yes	—N/a	Yes	Minit
2021	"Energetic" (에너제틱)	Amaru, Lee Tae-woo	Loud 2Round Team Mission	Yes	Wooseok	Yes	Flow Blow, EastWest
2021	"Oh-Eh-Oh" (Band Ver.)	JO1	Digital single	Yes	Ellie Love	Yes	Minit, AirAir, DJ Kaesama
2021	"Dr. Bebe" (Dr. 베베)	Jang Hyun-seung, Jeon Ji-woo	Double Trouble 1st EP Black Swan	Yes	Wooseok	Yes	Nathan, yunji, basecamp
2022	"Energetic" (에너제틱)	Minzy, Inseong	Double Trouble 3rd EP Sporty	Yes	Wooseok	Yes	Flow Blow, Seo Ji-eun
2024	"Jackpot"	Vanner	Capture The Flag	Yes	Wooseok, Nathan, Hoho	Yes	Wooseok, Nathan, Hoho
2024	"Rainy Days" (비가 오는 날엔) (2024 Remake ver.)	Nowadays	Digital single	Yes	Choi Kyu-seong, Jinhyuk, Siyun	Yes	Choi Kyu-seong, Siixk Jun
2025	"Starlight" (Prod. Hui)	David Bong	Start Line	Yes	—N/a	Yes	The Proof
2025	"Knockin' On Heaven" (Prod. Hui)	Soulpact	B:My Boyz - Final Round	Yes	Muzzle Hanjisusu	Yes	All About (JayDope), Migo, Krap, Muzzle Hanjisusu, Fernandes Carlyle Cosmas Savio
2025	"Slanted" (Prod. Hui)	Best Of Me	B:My Boyz - Final Round	Yes	Muzzle Hanjisusu	Yes	The Proof, Muzzle Hanjisusu, Do Woo
**Bold** denotes title track.

== Others ==
Year	Song	Artist	Album	Lyrics		Music	
Year	Song	Artist	Album	Credited	With	Credited	With
2018	"Theme Song 1"	Idol Room	—N/a	Yes	Wooseok	Yes	The Proof

== See also ==
- List of songs recorded by Pentagon
