= List of songs written and produced by Wooseok =

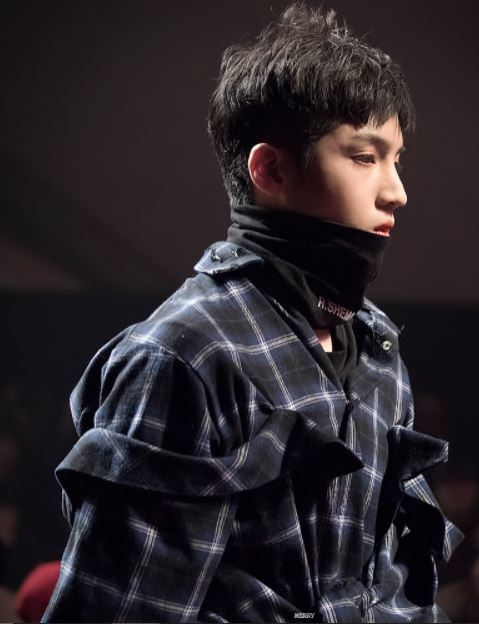
Wooseok during Seoul Fashion Week on March 24, 2018.

Jung Woo-seok (Hangul: 정우석; born January 31, 1998), more commonly known by the mononym Wooseok, is a South Korean rapper, songwriter, and composer. He debuted as a member of the South Korean boy group Pentagon in October 2016, and later formed a duo with Lai Kuan-lin as Wooseok X Kuanlin in March 2019. In 2025, he created the project band KIK alongside Jung Min-hyuk of Lacuna and Oh Myung-seok of SURL.

In addition to his solo work, Wooseok co-writes a majority of Pentagon's output alongside the other members. He has also written music for other artists, including Wanna One, (G)I-dle, Nowz, Yuqi, Ong Seong-wu, and Vanner. As of April 2026, the Korea Music Copyright Association has 136 songs listed under his name.

All credits are adapted from the Korea Music Copyright Association, unless stated otherwise.

== Songs ==
=== 2016 ===
Song	Artist(s)	Album	Lyrics		Music	
Song	Artist(s)	Album	Credited	With	Credited	With
"Young" (젊어) (Prod. by Dok2)	Hui, Yeo One, Yuto, Kino, Wooseok	Digital Single	Yes	Hui, Yeo One, Yuto, Kino	Yes	Hui, Yeo One, Yuto, Kino, Dok2
"Lukewarm" (미지근해)	Pentagon	Pentagon	Yes	Kang Dong-ha, E'Dawn	No	—N/a
"Organic Song" (귀 좀 막아줘) (E'Dawn, Yuto, Wooseok with Hui)	Pentagon	Pentagon	Yes	E'Dawn	No	—N/a
"Engine"	Pentagon	Five Senses	Yes	Ferdy, Kang Dong-ha, Yuto	No	—N/a
"Special Christmas"	Hyuna, Jang Hyun-seung, BtoB, Roh Ji-hoon, CLC, Pentagon	2016 United Cube Project Part 1	Yes	Hong Seung-Sung, Big Sancho, Jo Sung-ho, Kang Dong-ha, Hyuna, Lee Min-hyuk, Peniel, Jung Il-hoon, Jang Yee-un, E'Dawn, Yuto	No	—N/a

=== 2017 ===
Song	Artist(s)	Album	Lyrics		Music	
Song	Artist(s)	Album	Credited	With	Credited	With
"Never"	Nation's Son	35 Boys 5 Concepts	Yes	Hui, E'Dawn	No	—N/a
"To Universe" (소중한 약속)	Pentagon	Ceremony	Yes	E'Dawn, Jinho, Yuto	No	—N/a
"Nothing"	Pentagon	Ceremony	Yes	Kang Dong-ha, Ra Young-ssi, E'Dawn, Yuto, Seo Jae-woo	No	—N/a
"Spectacular" (스펙터클 해)	Pentagon	Ceremony	Yes	Jo Sung-ho, Son Young-jin, E'Dawn, Yuto	No	—N/a
"Energetic" (에너제틱)	Wanna One	1x1=1 (To Be One)	Yes	Hui	No	—N/a
"Never"	Wanna One	1x1=1 (To Be One)	Yes	Hui, E'Dawn	No	—N/a
"Party (Follow Me)"	Hyuna ft. Wooseok	Following	Yes	Hyuna, Big Sancho	No	—N/a
"Like This"	Pentagon	Demo 01	Yes	Hui, E'Dawn, Yuto	No	—N/a
"It's Over"	Pentagon	Demo 01	Yes	Kino, E'Dawn	No	—N/a
"One More Night" (오늘까지만)	Pentagon	Demo 01	Yes	Ferdy, Jinho, E'Dawn, Yuto	No	—N/a
"Get That Drink" (멋있게랩) (E'Dawn, Yuto, Wooseok)	Pentagon	Demo 01	Yes	E'Dawn, Yuto	Yes	E'Dawn, Yuto
"When I Was in Love" (설렘이라는건)	Pentagon	Demo 01	Yes	Hui, E'Dawn, Yuto	No	—N/a
"Lift Off"	Wooseok ft. E'Dawn	—N/a	Yes	E'Dawn	Yes	Kino
"Energetic" (에너제틱) (Prequel Remix)	Wanna One	1-1=0 (Nothing Without You)	Yes	Hui	No	—N/a
"Violet"	Pentagon	Demo 02	Yes	Kino, E'Dawn, Yuto	No	—N/a
"Runaway"	Pentagon	Demo 02	Yes	Hui, E'Dawn, Yuto	No	—N/a
"All Right"	Pentagon	Demo 02	Yes	Son Young-jin, Jinho, E'Dawn, Yuto	No	—N/a
"Pretty Boys" (Rap Unit)	Pentagon	Demo 02	Yes	E'Dawn, Yuto	Yes	E'Dawn, Yuto, Big Sancho

=== 2018 ===
Song	Artist(s)	Album	Lyrics		Music	
Song	Artist(s)	Album	Credited	With	Credited	With
"No Way"	Red Is Strong	The UNI+ B Step 1	Yes	Kanto, Seo Jae-woo	No	—N/a
"Violet" (Japanese Ver.)	Pentagon	Violet	Yes	Kino, E'Dawn, Yuto, Yu Shimoji	No	—N/a
"Trust Me"	Yuto with E'Dawn, Wooseok	—N/a	Yes	E'Dawn, Yuto	Yes	E'Dawn, Yuto
"Off-Road"	Pentagon	Positive	Yes	Kino, E'Dawn, Yuto	No	—N/a
"Shine" (빛나리)	Pentagon	Positive	Yes	E'Dawn, Hui, Yuto	No	—N/a
"Think About You" (생각해)	Pentagon	Positive	Yes	Kang Dong-ha, E'Dawn, Jinho, Yuto	No	—N/a
"Do It for Fun" (재밌겠다) (Rap Unit)	Pentagon	Positive	Yes	E'Dawn, Yuto	No	—N/a
"Nothing I Can Do" (보낼 수밖에)	Pentagon	Positive	Yes	Jo Sung-ho, Son Young-jin, E'Dawn	No	—N/a
"Let's Go Together" (함께 가자 우리)	Pentagon	Positive	Yes	E'Dawn, Kang Dong-ha	No	—N/a
"Idol Room Signal Song Pentagon Ver."	Pentagon	—N/a	Yes	Hui	No	—N/a
"Mermaid"	Lee Min-hyuk, Peniel, Jung Il-hoon, Jang Yee-un, Wooseok, Soyeon	One	Yes	Lee Min-hyuk, Peniel, Jung Il-hoon, Jang Yee-un, Soyeon	No	—N/a
"Young and One"	Hyuna, Jo Kwon, BtoB, CLC, Pentagon, Yoo Seon-ho, (G)I-dle	One	Yes	Hyuna, Seo Yong-bae, Lee Min-hyuk, Peniel, BREADBEAT, E'Dawn, Yuto, Soyeon, Jang Yee-un, Kwon Eun-bin, Seo Jae-woo	No	—N/a
"Ain't No Time"	Kim Dong-han ft. Wooseok	D-Day	Yes	HSND, Nano	No	—N/a
"This Stop Is"	Hui, YooA, Wooseok	Gaegasoo Producer: Streaming	Yes	Hui, Jung Hyung-don	No	—N/a
"Shine" (Japanese ver.)	Pentagon	Shine	Yes	E'Dawn, Hui, Yuto, Shoko Fujibayashi	No	—N/a
"Off-Road" (Japanese ver.)	Pentagon	Shine	Yes	Kino, E'Dawn, Yuto, Mion Yano	No	—N/a
"I'm Fine"	Pentagon	Shine	Yes	Hui, Yuto, E'Dawn	No	—N/a
"Nightmare -wake up-" (悪夢 -wake up-)	Pentagon	Shine	Yes	Kino, Yuto, E'Dawn, Yocke	No	—N/a
"Naughty Boy" (청개구리)	Pentagon	Thumbs Up!	Yes	E'Dawn, Hui, Yuto	No	—N/a
"Just Do It Yo!!"	Pentagon	Thumbs Up!	Yes	Hui, Kino, Yuto, Shinwon	No	—N/a
"Skateboard"	Pentagon	Thumbs Up!	Yes	E'Dawn, Kino, Yuto	No	—N/a
"When It Rains at Night" (밤에 비가 내리면)	Pentagon	Thumbs Up!	Yes	Kino, Yuto	No	—N/a
"Thumbs Up!"	Pentagon	Thumbs Up!	Yes	Hui	No	—N/a

=== 2019 ===
Song	Artist(s)	Album	Lyrics		Music	
Song	Artist(s)	Album	Credited	With	Credited	With
"Naughty Boy" (Japanese ver.)	Pentagon	Cosmo	Yes	E'Dawn, Hui, Yuto, Shoko Fujibayashi	No	—N/a
"I'm a Star" (별짓)	Wooseok x Kuanlin	9801	Yes	Peejay, Taeo, Lai Kuan-lin	No	—N/a
"Always Difficult Always Beautiful"	Wooseok	9801	Yes	Kino	Yes	Kino, Nathan
"Domino"	Wooseok	9801	Yes	–	Yes	Mospick
"Sha La La" (신토불이)	Pentagon	Genie:us	Yes	Hui	No	—N/a
"Lost Paradise" (Hip Hop Unit)	Pentagon	Genie:us	Yes	Hui, Yuto, Kino	Yes	Hui, Yuto, Kino, Nathan
"Alien" (에일리언)	Pentagon	Genie:us	Yes	Hui, Shinwon, Yuto	No	—N/a
"Spring Snow" (봄눈)	Pentagon	Genie:us	Yes	Kino, Yuto	No	—N/a
"Round 1" (Bonus Track)	Pentagon	Genie:us	Yes	Jinho, Hui, Hongseok, Shinwon, Yeo One, Yan An, Yuto, Kino	Yes	Jinho, Hui, Hongseok, Shinwon, Yeo One, Yan An, Yuto, Kino, Mospick
"Genius"	Pentagon ft. Pentagon's Dads	—N/a	Yes	Hui, Kino, Yuto, Shinwon	No	—N/a
"Heart Sign" (Prod. by Flow Blow)	Ong Seong-wu	Digital Single	Yes	Hui, Flow Blow	No	—N/a
"Humph!" (접근금지) (Prod. by Giriboy)	Pentagon	Sum(me:r)	Yes	Hui, Giriboy	No	—N/a
"Fantasystic" (판타지스틱) (Prod. by Giriboy)	Pentagon	Sum(me:r)	Yes	Hui	No	—N/a
"Summer!"	Pentagon	Sum(me:r)	Yes	Jinho, Hui	No	—N/a
"Round 2" (Bonus Track)	Pentagon	Sum(me:r)	Yes	Jinho, Hui, Hongseok, Shinwon, Yeo One, Yan An, Yuto, Kino	Yes	Jinho, Hui, Hongseok, Shinwon, Yeo One, Yan An, Yuto, Kino, Mospick
"Sha La La" (Japanese ver.)	Pentagon	Happiness / Sha La La	Yes	Hui, Shōko Fujibayashi	No	—N/a
"Spring Snow" (Japanese ver.)	Pentagon	Happiness / Sha La La	Yes	–	No	—N/a
"Way" (도 (道))	Pentagon	Two Yoo Project Sugar Man 3 Ep 1	Yes	Jang Yong-jin	No	—N/a

=== 2020 ===
Song	Artist(s)	Album	Lyrics		Music	
Song	Artist(s)	Album	Credited	With	Credited	With
"Fine Day"	Mospick, Jeong Young-eun ft. Wooseok	Digital Single	Yes	Jo Sung-ho, Son Young-jin, Ferdy, Jay Jay	No	—N/a
"Dr. BeBe" (Dr. 베베)	Pentagon	Universe: The Black Hall	Yes	Hui	No	—N/a
"Asteroid" (소행성)	Pentagon	Universe: The Black Hall	Yes	Lee Seu-ran	No	—N/a
"Shower of Rain" (빗물 샤워)	Pentagon	Universe: The Black Hall	Yes	Hui	No	—N/a
"Die for You"	Pentagon	Universe: The Black Hall	Yes	Kino, Nathan	No	—N/a
"Talk"	Pentagon	Universe: The Black Hall	Yes	Jinho	No	—N/a
"The Black Hall"	Pentagon	Universe: The Black Hall	Yes	Hui	No	—N/a
"Worship U"	Pentagon	Universe: The Black Hall	Yes	Lee Seu-ran, earattack	No	—N/a
"Camellia" (동백꽃)	Pentagon	Universe: The Black Hall	Yes	Yuto, FCM Houdini	No	—N/a
"Happiness" (도망가자) (Korean Ver.)	Pentagon	Universe: The Black Hall	Yes	Kino, Yuto	No	—N/a
"Happiness" (도망가자) (Rock Ver.) Demo	Kino, Hui, Wooseok, Yuto	—N/a	Yes	Kino, Yuto	No	—N/a
"I'm Loving You" (Korean Ver.)	Glay, Pentagon	Digital Single	Yes	Jinho, Takuro	No	—N/a
"Very Good" (Pentagon Ver.)	Pentagon	Road to Kingdom Song of King Part 2	Yes	Zico, Hui	No	—N/a
"Shine + Spring Snow" (빛나리+봄눈)	Pentagon	Road to Kingdom My Song	Yes	Hui, Dawn, Yuto, Kino	No	—N/a
"Basquiat" (바스키아)	Pentagon	Road to Kingdom Final	Yes	Hui	Yes	Nathan, Hui, yunji
"To Universe" (Japanese ver.)	Pentagon	Universe: The History	Yes	Jinho, E'Dawn, Yuto, Ryuji Fujita	No	—N/a
"Violet" (2020 Japanese ver.)	Pentagon	Universe: The History	Yes	Kino, E'Dawn, Yuto, Yu Shimoji	No	—N/a
"Shine" (2020 Japanese ver.)	Pentagon	Universe: The History	Yes	E'Dawn, Hui, Yuto, Shoko Fujibayashi	No	—N/a
"Humph!" (Japanese ver.)	Pentagon	Universe: The History	Yes	Hui, Giriboy, Shōko Fujibayashi	No	—N/a
"Dr. Bebe" (Japanese ver.)	Pentagon	Universe: The History	Yes	Hui, Shōko Fujibayashi	No	—N/a
"Twenty-Twenty"	Pentagon	Twenty-Twenty OST Part 1	Yes	Kino	No	—N/a
"Daisy" (데이지)	Pentagon	We:th	Yes	Hui	Yes	Hui, Nathan, yunji
"Beautiful Goodbye"	Pentagon	We:th	Yes	Kino	No	—N/a
"Nostalgia" (그해 그달 그날)	Pentagon	We:th	Yes	–	Yes	MosPick
"You Like"	Pentagon	We:th	Yes	Hui	Yes	Hui, Minit
"Paradise" (Paradise (별이 빛나는 이 밤))	Pentagon	We:th	Yes	Kino	No	—N/a
"Daisy" (Japanese ver.)	Pentagon	Do or Not	Yes	Hui, Shōko Fujibayashi	Yes	Hui, Nathan, yunji
"Daisy" (Chinese ver.)	Pentagon	Digital Single	Yes	Hui, Z KING	Yes	Hui, Nathan, yunji
"Repeat:II" (도돌이표) (Note: "Repeat:II" was performed at Pentagon's online concert We L:ve)	Yuto, Wooseok	Unreleased Song	Yes	Yuto	Yes	Jay Jay
"Eternal Flame" (불꽃)	Pentagon	Digital Single	Yes	Kino, Yuto, Universe	No	—N/a

=== 2021 ===
Song	Artist(s)	Album	Lyrics		Music	
Song	Artist(s)	Album	Credited	With	Credited	With
"Honey Drop"	Pentagon	Replay OST Part 1	Yes	Moonkim	No	—N/a
"10s And" (10초 전)	Pentagon	Love or Take	Yes	Hui	Yes	Hui, chAN's, DARM
"Do or Not"	Pentagon	Love or Take	Yes	Hui	Yes	Hui, Nathan
"1+1"	Pentagon	Love or Take	Yes	Cho Yoon-kyung	No	—N/a
"Baby I Love You"	Pentagon	Love or Take	Yes	Kino	No	—N/a
"That's Me"	Pentagon	Love or Take	Yes	Hui	Yes	Hui, chAN's, DARM
"Sing-a-song" (노래해)	Pentagon	Love or Take	Yes	Hui	Yes	Hui, chAN's, Normal (Party in my pool)
"Do or Not" (English ver.)	Pentagon	Digital Single	Yes	Hui, Gabriel Brandes	Yes	Hui, Nathan
"Do or Not" (Chinese ver.)	Pentagon	Digital Single	Yes	Hui, Arys Chien	Yes	Hui, Nathan
"Do or Not" (Japanese ver.)	Pentagon	Do or Not	Yes	Hui, Shoko Fujibayashi	Yes	Hui, Nathan
"Don't Worry 'Bout Me"	Pentagon	Do or Not	Yes	Kino, Yuto, Shoko Fujibayashi	No	—N/a
"Energetic" (에너제틱)	Amaru, Lee Tae-woo	Loud 2Round Team Mission	Yes	Hui	No	—N/a
"Beautiful Goodbye" (Rock Ver.) Demo	Pentagon	—N/a	Yes	Kino	No	—N/a
"Cerberus" (Yuto, Kino, Wooseok)	Pentagon	Digital Single	Yes	Kino, Yuto	Yes	Kino, Yuto, chAN's
"Dr. Bebe" (Dr. 베베)	Jang Hyun-seung, Jeon Ji-woo	Double Trouble 1st EP Black Swan	Yes	Hui	No	—N/a

=== 2022 ===
Song	Artist(s)	Album	Lyrics		Music	
Song	Artist(s)	Album	Credited	With	Credited	With
"Feelin' Like"	Pentagon	In:vite U	Yes	HAEE, Kino, Jinho	No	—N/a
"One Shot" (한탕)	Pentagon	In:vite U	Yes	Shinwon	Yes	Nathan, Shinwon, MILLENIUM
"The Game"	Pentagon	In:vite U	Yes	—N/a	Yes	Nathan, yunji, Hoho
"Call My Name"	Pentagon	In:vite U	Yes	Kino, HAEE	No	—N/a
"Sparkling Night" (관람차)	Pentagon	In:vite U	Yes	Kino	No	—N/a
"Bad"	Pentagon	In:vite U	Yes	—N/a	Yes	Siixk Jun
"Energetic" (에너제틱)	Minzy, Inseong	Double Trouble 3rd EP Sporty	Yes	Hui	No	—N/a
"Call My Name" (Rock Ver.)	Pentagon	—N/a	Yes	Kino, HAEE	No	—N/a
"Now or Never"	Kino, Wooseok, Jinho	—N/a	Yes	Kino	No	—N/a
"Pose"	Kino	Non-album single	Yes	Kino	Yes	Kino, Nathan, yunji
"Feelin' Like" (Japanese ver.)	Pentagon	Feelin' Like	Yes	HAEE, Kino, Jinho, Riho Okano	No	—N/a
"Sparkling Night" (Japanese ver.)	Pentagon	Feelin' Like	Yes	Kino, Furuta	No	—N/a
"Don't"	Pentagon	Feelin' Like	Yes	Kino, Kaito Akatsuka	Yes	Kino, Kim Zion, Son Yo-seb, Gayeoni
"Mr. Wolf"	Pentagon	Feelin' Like	Yes	Jinho, Furuta	No	—N/a
"Gone"	Wooseok	Unreleased song	Yes	—N/a	Yes	Siixk Jun
"Poppia" (Saudi Arabia ver.)	Pentagon	KCON 2022 Saudi Arabia Signature Song	Yes	e.one, Dono	No	—N/a

=== 2023 ===
Song	Artist(s)	Album	Lyrics		Music	
Song	Artist(s)	Album	Credited	With	Credited	With
"Autodeadma"	Maymay Entrata ft. Wooseok	Digital Single	Yes	EJ Bolano, Loriebelle Aira Darunday, Justin Catalan, Rox Santos, Jonathan Manalo	No	—N/a
"All Night"	(G)I-dle	I Feel	Yes	Yuqi	No	—N/a
"Peter Pan" (어린 어른)	(G)I-dle	I Feel	No	—N/a	Yes	Yuqi, Siixk Jun
"Oasis"	Hui, Wooseok	Unreleased Song	Yes	Hui	Yes	Hui, The Proof (Park Seong-ho), The Proof (Jo Kang-hyun)
"Loop (L∞P)"	Pentagon	Pado	Yes	Kino, Nathan, Aska Tsuchiya	Yes	Kino, Nathan, yunji
"Made in Heaven"	Pentagon	Pado	Yes	Kino, Yuto, Kaito Akatsuka	No	—N/a
"With Universe" (약속)	Pentagon	Digital Single	Yes	Hui, Yuto	Yes	Siixk Jun, Hui, Krap
"We Are I" (우린 I)	Soyeon, Wooseok	Digital Single	Yes	Lee Jung-woo, cozy, Jay Hong, Boojoo Kim, 30billion	No	—N/a

=== 2024 ===
Song	Artist(s)	Album	Lyrics		Music	
Song	Artist(s)	Album	Credited	With	Credited	With
"Melo"	Hui ft. Park Hyeon-jin	Whu Is Me: Complex	Yes	Hui, Park Hyeon-jin	Yes	Hui, Park Hyeon-jin, Park Seong-ho, Jo Kang-hyun
"Cold Killer"	Hui ft. Jinhyuk	Whu Is Me: Complex	Yes	Hui	Yes	Hui, Park Seong-ho, Jo Kang-hyun
"A Song From A Dream"	Hui ft. Wooseok	Whu Is Me: Complex	Yes	Hui	Yes	Hui, Minit
"Jackpot"	Vanner	Capture The Flag	Yes	Hui, Nathan, Hoho	Yes	Hui, Nathan, Hoho
"Navy Blue"	Wooseok	Empty Paper	Yes	—N/a	Yes	Siixk Jun, swimgood
"Sketch"	Wooseok	Empty Paper	Yes	—N/a	Yes	Siixk Jun, swimgood
"Neverland"	(G)I-dle	I Sway	No	—N/a	Yes	Yuqi, Siixk Jun
"Burnin'"	Hui ft. Wooseok	Disk Defragmenter (Note: Uploaded to YouTube in a series called "Disk Defragmenter")	Yes	Hui, Muzzle Hanjisusu	Yes	Hui, Muzzle Hanjisusu
"Easy Dance"	Hui ft. Kwon Eun-bi	Digital Single	Yes	Hui, JayJay, Park Woo-jung	Yes	Hui, JayJay, Park Woo-jung

=== 2025 ===
Song	Artist(s)	Album	Lyrics		Music	
Song	Artist(s)	Album	Credited	With	Credited	With
"Romance"	Wooseok	Ender to Ander	Yes	—N/a	Yes	Swimgood
"Runner"	Wooseok	Ender to Ander	Yes	—N/a	Yes	Swimgood
"Why Do You Love Me"	Wooseok	Ender to Ander	Yes	—N/a	Yes	Swimgood
"Forward" (직선)	Wooseok	Ender to Ander	Yes	—N/a	Yes	Chu Byeong-jun, Lennon, Won Young Chung, Mango, Griffy
"Break The Window"	Wooseok	Ender to Ander	Yes	—N/a	Yes	Swimgood
"Mind" (심)	Wooseok	Ender to Ander	Yes	—N/a	Yes	Chu Byeong-jun, Lennon
"Letting Go"	Wooseok	Ender to Ander	Yes	—N/a	Yes	Chu Byeong-jun, Lennon, Won Young Chung, Mango
"Fly To The Youth"	Nowz ft. Yuqi	Ignition	Yes	Yuqi, Siyun, Jinhyuk, Yeonwoo, Hyeonbin, Yoon	Yes	Siixk Jun, Yuqi, Siyun, Jinhyuk
"Fly To The Youth" (Chinese ver.)	Nowz ft. Yuqi	Digital Single	Yes	Yuqi, Eleven Zhan	Yes	Siixk Jun, Yuqi, Siyun, Jinhyuk
"Captain's Order"	KIK	KIK	Yes	Oh Myeong-suk, Jung Min-hyuk	Yes	Jung Min-hyuk, Oh Myeong-suk, Jung Yeong-jae, Ha Hyung-eon
"Simple"	KIK	KIK	Yes	Oh Myeong-suk, Jung Min-hyuk	Yes	Jung Min-hyuk, Oh Myeong-suk, Jung Yeong-jae, Ha Hyung-eon
"Ferrari"	KIK	KIK	Yes	Oh Myeong-suk, Jung Min-hyuk	Yes	Jung Min-hyuk, Oh Myeong-suk, Jung Yeong-jae, Ha Hyung-eon
"Timer"	KIK	KIK	Yes	Oh Myeong-suk, Jung Min-hyuk	Yes	Jung Min-hyuk, Oh Myeong-suk, Jung Yeong-jae, Ha Hyung-eon
"LP Club"	KIK	KIK	Yes	Oh Myeong-suk, Jung Min-hyuk	Yes	Jung Min-hyuk, Oh Myeong-suk, Jung Yeong-jae, Ha Hyung-eon
"Ah"	KIK	Bright #14	Yes	Oh Myeong-suk, Jung Min-hyuk	Yes	Jung Min-hyuk, Oh Myeong-suk, Jung Yeong-jae
"U"	Wooseok	Digital Single	Yes	—N/a	Yes	Swimgood, Siixk Jun
"Gone" (아프다)	Yuqi	Motivation	Yes	Yuqi, Eleven Zhan	Yes	Siixk Jun, Yuqi
"Gone" (还痛吗)	Yuqi	Motivation	Yes	Yuqi, Lilias (VNTA), JustinW, Li Xiang, Juny (Sendao Studio) Eleven Zhan	Yes	Siixk Jun, Yuqi
"Tomorrow" (Song by E.R.E.R)	Steal Heart Club	Steal Heart Club - Band Unit Battle	Yes	Riaan, Dane, Kwon Young-bin	Yes	Riaan, Dane, Park Ki-tae

=== 2026 ===
Song	Artist(s)	Album	Lyrics		Music	
Song	Artist(s)	Album	Credited	With	Credited	With
"3333"	KIK	Low Kik	Yes	Oh Myeong-suk, Jung Min-hyuk	Yes	Oh Myeong-suk, Jung Min-hyuk, Jung Young-jae
"Sun"	KIK	Low Kik	Yes	Oh Myeong-suk, Jung Min-hyuk	Yes	Oh Myeong-suk, Ha Hyeong-eon, Jung Min-hyuk, Jung Young-jae
"Piece of Piece"	KIK ft. Dept	Low Kik	Yes	Oh Myeong-suk, Jung Min-hyuk, Luke, Benz	Yes	Oh Myeong-suk, Jung Min-hyuk, Jung Young-jae, Luke, Benz
"Diamond"	KIK	Low Kik	Yes	Oh Myeong-suk, Jung Min-hyuk	Yes	Oh Myeong-suk, Ha Hyeong-eon, Jung Min-hyuk, Kim Ki-bum, Jung Young-jae
"Bella"	KIK	Low Kik	Yes	Oh Myeong-suk, Jung Min-hyuk	Yes	Oh Myeong-suk, Ha Hyeong-eon, Jung Min-hyuk, Jung Young-jae
"Close"	KIK	Low Kik	Yes	Oh Myeong-suk, Jung Min-hyuk	Yes	Oh Myeong-suk, Ha Hyeong-eon, Jung Min-hyuk, Jung Young-jae

=== Others ===
Song	Year	Artist	Album	Notes
"Dumdi Dumdi"	2020	(G)I-dle	Dumdi Dumdi	Chorus
"WTH"	2021	Hui, Shinwon	—N/a	Narration
