= List of songs written and produced by Kino =

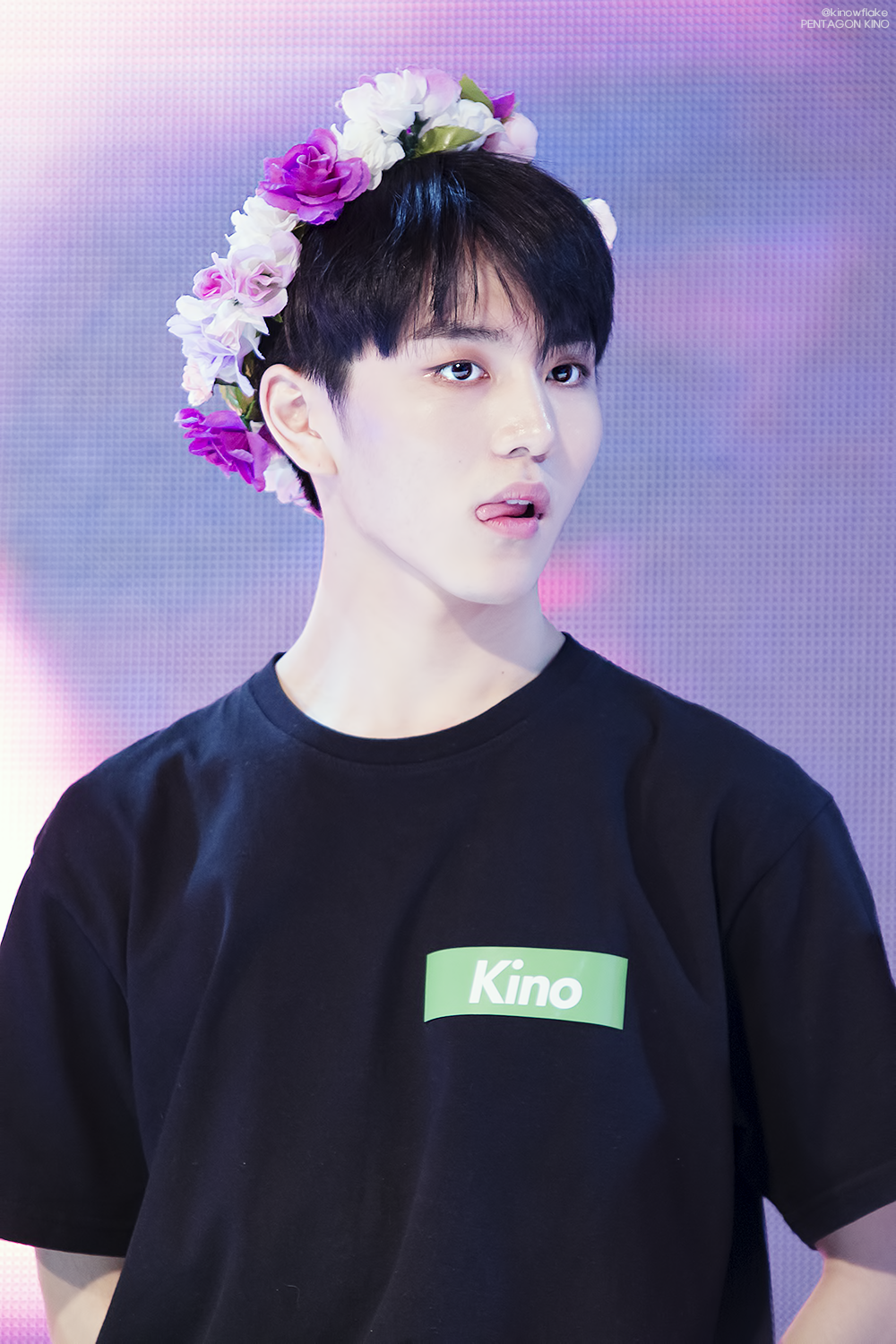
Kino in December 2017

Kang Hyung-gu (Korean: 강형구; born January 27, 1998), better known as Kino (키노) or his producer name Knnovation, is a South Korean singer, songwriter and composer. He debuted as a member of the South Korean boy group Pentagon under Cube Entertainment in October 2016. Kino helps produce much of Pentagon's output, with his most notable songs including "Spring Snow", "Happiness", and "Violet". In addition to his work with Pentagon, Kino has a catalog of self-written solo music, mostly published through his SoundCloud account. He has also written and produced songs for other artists, including Pentagon bandmate Wooseok, A.C.E, Jung Dong-ha, A Train To Autumn, Lee Soo-young, and more. As of April 2026, the Korea Music Copyright Association has 86 songs listed under his name.

All credits are adapted from the Korea Music Copyright Association, unless stated otherwise.

== Solo work ==
Year	Song	Album	Lyrics		Music	
Year	Song	Album	Credited	With	Credited	With
2017	"Lonely"	—N/a	Yes	—N/a	Yes	—N/a
2017	"Universe" Demo (58 guide ver.)	—N/a	Yes	—N/a	Yes	—N/a
2017	"Voicegasm"	—N/a	Yes	—N/a	Yes	—N/a
2017	"Romance" (낭만) (Hongseok & Kino)	—N/a	Yes	—N/a	Yes	—N/a
2017	"Eyes" Demo Preview (58 guide ver.)	—N/a	Yes	—N/a	Yes	—N/a
2017	"Now I'm Going To U" (지금 너에게로 가는 중이야) (Preview)	—N/a	Yes	—N/a	Yes	—N/a
2018	"sing for thy son, for whom with the figure of an angel"	—N/a	Yes	—N/a	Yes	—N/a
2018	"aquatic talks" (Kino x Hoho)	—N/a	Yes	—N/a	Yes	Hoho
2018	"Butterfly" (Demo)	—N/a	Yes	—N/a	Yes	—N/a
2018	"Keep Rollin'"	—N/a	Yes	—N/a	Yes	—N/a
2018	"Sunshine/Mango" (Demo)	—N/a	Yes	—N/a	Yes	—N/a
2018	"Nobody Else" (Demo)	—N/a	Yes	—N/a	Yes	—N/a
2019	"Lonely" (New Mix)	—N/a	Yes	—N/a	Yes	—N/a
2019	"224.12"	—N/a	Yes	—N/a	Yes	—N/a
2019	"The Greatest Wall" (Hui & Kino)	—N/a	Yes	Hui	Yes	Gayeoni, Hui
2019	"Badtiming"	—N/a	Yes	—N/a	Yes	—N/a
2019	"La Di Da" (Hui & Kino)	—N/a	Yes	—N/a	Yes	Nathan
2019	"Do I Deserve It"	—N/a	Yes	Nathan	Yes	Nathan
2019	"TicToc" (똑딱) (Hui x Kino)	—N/a	Yes	Hui	Yes	Hui
2020	"Tell Me What You Want"	—N/a	Yes	—N/a	Yes	—N/a
2020	"Poison" (독 ( )) (Unordinary Sunday, Kino)	Unordinary Sunday Vol.01	Yes	—N/a	Yes	Soho, Kim Zion, Gayeoni
2021	"Sunflower" (Unordinary Sunday, Kino, Yumin)	Unordinary Sunday Vol.02	Yes	Nathan	Yes	Soho, Kim Zion, Gayeoni
2021	"Up&Down" (Peakboy & Kino, with Brother Bin)	—N/a	Yes	Peakboy	Yes	Peakboy, Hyesung, Hwal
2021	"Stay With Me"	Pumpkin Time OST	Yes	—N/a	Yes	—N/a
2022	"Now Or Never" (Kino, Wooseok, Jinho)	—N/a	Yes	Wooseok	Yes	Nathan, Hoho
2022	"Pose"	Non-album single	Yes	Wooseok	Yes	Nathan, yunji, Wooseok
2023	"How It Was" (Fudasca, Kino, Lentra)	Digital Single	Yes	Lentra, Simone Eleuteri, Daniele Baroni, Gianfranco Federico, Luca Giachi	Yes	Fudasca, Lentra, Simone Eleuteri, Daniele Baroni, Gianfranco Federico, Luca Giachi
2023	"Baby Blue" (Demo)	—N/a	Yes	—N/a	Yes	Chan's
2024	"Fashion Style"	If This Is Love, I Want A Refund	Yes	YSL	Yes	Nathan
2024	"Freaky Love"	If This Is Love, I Want A Refund	Yes	YSL, Yooni	Yes	chAN's, oro
2024	"Broke My Heart" (Kino ft. Lay Bankz)	If This Is Love, I Want A Refund	Yes	Lay Bankz, YSL, Shannon	Yes	Lay Bankz, MILLIC, chAN’s
2024	"Solo"	If This Is Love, I Want A Refund	Yes	YSL, Ninos Hanna	Yes	Ninos Hanna, Max Graham, Matt Thomson, ARCADES
2024	"Valentine"	If This Is Love, I Want A Refund	Yes	—N/a	Yes	Vegard Hurum, Fredrik Anstensen, X-Child, Glen Choi
2024	"Dancing On The Road"	Digital Single	Yes	Shannon, Hey Farmer	Yes	Shannon, Hey Farmer
2024	"Everglow"	Digital Single	Yes	Haee	Yes	X-Child, Hoho, Son Yo-seb
2025	"Skyfall"	Digital Single	Yes	Lee Yeonsoo, Alex Karlsson	Yes	Chan's, WellCookedMusic, Alex Karlsson
2025	"My Turntable Is Concrete Pt. 2"	Everybody's Guilty, No One's to Blame	Yes	—N/a	Yes	bojvck
2025	"Dirty Boy" (Kino ft. Jamie, Uwa)	Everybody's Guilty, No One's to Blame	Yes	YSL	Yes	Jamie, Marcus Fellai, Tomas Schmidt, yunji
2025	"Mapsi"	Everybody's Guilty, No One's to Blame	Yes	YSL	Yes	chAN’s (TAKE A CHANCE), Hiiily (TAKE A CHANCE)
2025	"Club Sex Cigarettes"	Everybody's Guilty, No One's to Blame	Yes	YSL, Leah Nobel	Yes	Hoho, Nathan
2025	"Devil On My Shoulder"	Everybody's Guilty, No One's to Blame	Yes	Leah Nobel	Yes	Leah Nobel, Marcus Fellai, Tomas Schmidt
2025	"Wurk" (Kino ft. Wooseok)	Everybody's Guilty, No One's to Blame	Yes	YSL	Yes	chAN’s (TAKE A CHANCE)
2025	"Annie"	Everybody's Guilty, No One's to Blame	Yes	YSL	Yes	chAN’s (TAKE A CHANCE)
2026	"Taxi"	Lost and Found	Yes	Kim Eana, Mikey Angelo, YSL, Beeya	Yes	Ioah, bojvck
2026	"Big Hoodie" (Kino ft. Mikey Angelo)	Lost and Found	Yes	Leah Nobel, Mikey Angelo, YSL	Yes	Leah Nobel, Preux, Mikey Angelo
2026	"Hennessy" (Kino ft. Lee Yoon-jung)	Lost and Found	Yes	Lee Yoon-jung	Yes	Preux, Garzón Robie, Lee Yoon-jung
2026	"All Love!"	Lost and Found	Yes	YSL	Yes	Preux

== Works by Pentagon ==
Year	Song	Album	Lyrics		Music	
Year	Song	Album	Credited	With	Credited	With
2017	"It's Over"	Demo_01	Yes	E'Dawn, Wooseok	Yes	Ferdy
2017	"Violet"	Demo_02	Yes	E'Dawn, Wooseok, Yuto	Yes	Nathan
2018	**"Violet" (Japanese Ver.)**	Violet	Yes	E'Dawn, Wooseok, Yuto, Yu Shimoji	Yes	Nathan
2018	"Off-Road"	Positive	Yes	E'Dawn, Wooseok, Yuto	Yes	JayJay
2018	"Off-Road" (Japanese Ver.)	Shine	Yes	E'Dawn, Wooseok, Yuto, Mion Yano	Yes	JayJay
2018	"Wake Up" (悪夢)	Shine	Yes	E'Dawn, Wooseok, Yuto, Yocke	Yes	Ferdy
2018	"Just Do It Yo!!" (저두요!!)	Thumbs Up!	Yes	Hui, Wooseok, Yuto, Shinwon	No	—N/a
2018	"Skateboard"	Thumbs Up!	Yes	E'Dawn, Wooseok, Yuto	Yes	Nathan
2018	"When It Rains at Night" (밤에 비가 내리면)	Thumbs Up!	Yes	Wooseok, Yuto	Yes	Benefits all humankind, MetDoeJi
2019	"Lost Paradise" (Hip Hop Unit)	Genie:us	Yes	Hui, Wooseok, Yuto	Yes	Nathan, Hui, Wooseok, Yuto
2019	"Spring Snow" (봄눈)	Genie:us	Yes	Wooseok, Yuto	Yes	Nathan, Hoho
2019	"Round 1" (Bonus Track)	Genie:us	Yes	Jinho, Hui, Hongseok, Shinwon, Yeo One, Yan An, Yuto, Wooseok	Yes	JayJay, Jinho, Hui, Hongseok, Shinwon, Yeo One, Yan An, Yuto, Wooseok
2019	"Round 2" (Bonus Track)	Sum(me:r)	Yes	Jinho, Hui, Hongseok, Shinwon, Yeo One, Yan An, Yuto, Wooseok	Yes	JayJay, Jinho, Hui, Hongseok, Shinwon, Yeo One, Yan An, Yuto, Wooseok
2019	**"Happiness"**	Happiness / Sha La La	Yes	Yuto, Kushita Mine	Yes	Benefits all humankind, MetDoeJi, Gayeoni
2019	"Spring Snow" (Japanese Ver.)	Happiness / Sha La La	Yes	—N/a	Yes	Nathan, Hoho
2020	"Die for You"	Universe: The Black Hall	Yes	Nathan, Wooseok	Yes	Nathan
2020	"Happiness" (KR Version)	Universe: The Black Hall	Yes	Wooseok, Yuto	Yes	Benefits all humankind, MetDoeJi, Gayeoni
2020	"Violet" (2020 Japanese Ver.)	Universe: The History	Yes	E'Dawn, Wooseok, Yuto, Yu Shimoji	Yes	Nathan
2020	"Beautiful Goodbye"	We:th	Yes	Wooseok	Yes	Nathan, Hoho
2020	"Paradise" (Paradise (별이 빛나는 이 밤))	We:th	Yes	Wooseok	Yes	Jay Jay
2020	"Eternal Flame" (불꽃)	Digital Single	Yes	Wooseok, Yuto, Universe	Yes	Nathan
2021	"Baby I Love You"	Love or Take	Yes	Wooseok	Yes	Nathan, Hoho
2021	"Don't Worry 'Bout Me"	Do or Not	Yes	Yuto, Wooseok, Shoko Fujibayashi	Yes	Nathan
2022	**"Feelin' Like"**	In:vite U	Yes	HAEE, Jinho, Wooseok	No	—N/a
2022	"Call My Name"	In:vite U	Yes	HAEE, Wooseok	Yes	Kim Zion, Milano, Son Yo-sep, Hyeogdu Choi
2022	"Sparkling Night" (관람차)	In:vite U	Yes	Wooseok	Yes	Roamer Doze
2022	**"Feelin' Like" (Japanese Ver.)**	Feelin' Like	Yes	HAEE, Wooseok, Jinho, Riho Okano	No	—N/a
2022	"Sparkling Night" (Japanese Ver.)	Feelin' Like	Yes	Wooseok, Furuta	Yes	Roamer Doze
2022	"Don't"	Feelin' Like	Yes	Wooseok, Kaito Akatsuka	Yes	Wooseok, Kim Zion, Son Yo-seb, Gayeoni
2023	**"Shh" (詩)**	Digital Single	Yes	HAEE, Kaito Akatsuka	Yes	Nathan, yunji
2023	**"Pado (Wave to Me)"**	Pado	Yes	Kaito Akatsuka	Yes	Nathan
2023	"Loop (L∞P)"	Pado	Yes	Nathan, Wooseok, Aska Tsuchiya	Yes	Nathan, Wooseok, yunji
2023	"Shh" (詩) (Aug ver.)	Pado	Yes	HAEE, Kaito Akatsuka	Yes	Nathan, yunji
2023	"Made in Heaven"	Pado	Yes	Wooseok, Yuto, Kaito Akatsuka	Yes	Nathan, Hoho
**Bold** denotes title track.

== Other works by Pentagon ==
Year	Song	Album	Lyrics		Music	
Year	Song	Album	Credited	With	Credited	With
2016	"Young" (젊어) (Prod. by Dok2) (Hui, Yeo One, Yuto, Kino, Wooseok)	Digital Single	Yes	Hui, Yeo One, Yuto, Wooseok	Yes	Hui, Yeo One, Yuto, Wooseok, Dok2
2019	"Miss U" (Jinho, Hui, Kino)	On The Campus OST Part 1	Yes	BPM, Cho Seong-cheon, Seo Eui-Bum	No	—N/a
2019	"Genius" (ft. Pentagon's Dads)	—N/a	Yes	Hui, Wooseok, Yuto, Shinwon	No	—N/a
2020	"Happiness" (도망가자) (Rock Ver.) Demo	—N/a	Yes	Wooseok, Yuto	Yes	Benefits all humankind, MetDoeJi, Gayeoni
2020	"Shine + Spring Snow" (빛나리+봄눈)	Road to Kingdom My Song Part 1	Yes	Hui, Dawn, Yuto, Wooseok	Yes	Flow Blow, Hui, Dawn, Nathan, Hoho, Minit
2020	"Twenty-Twenty"	Twenty-Twenty OST Part 1	Yes	Wooseok	Yes	Nathan
2020	"Love Rain" (사랑비)	Immortal Songs: Cheer Up, Korea! Celebrity Special Part 2: Park Se-ri	No	—N/a	Yes	Lee Hyun-Seung, Siixk Jun
2021	"Beautiful Goodbye" (Rock Ver.) Demo	—N/a	Yes	Wooseok	Yes	Nathan, Hoho
2021	"Cerberus" (Yuto, Kino, Wooseok)	Digital Single	Yes	Wooseok, Yuto	Yes	Wooseok, Yuto, chAN's
2022	"Naughty Boy" (개구장이)	Immortal Songs - Artist Kim Chang-wan, Part 1	No	—N/a	Yes	Kim Chang-wan, Siixk Jun
2022	"Call My Name" (Rock Ver.)	—N/a	Yes	HAEE, Wooseok	Yes	Kim Zion, Milano, Siixk Jun

== Other artists ==
Year	Song	Artist	Album	Lyrics		Music	
Year	Song	Artist	Album	Credited	With	Credited	With
2017	"Chillin'" (5MOLAs Ver.)	M.O.L.A	—N/a	Yes	Park Ji-min, Luizy, Nathan, Vernon	Yes	Park Ji-min, Luizy, Nathan, Vernon
2018	"Lift Off" (prod by. Kino)	Wooseok (ft. E'Dawn)	—N/a	No	—N/a	Yes	Wooseok
2018	"PUTP" (전화받아)	Park Ji-min (ft. Kino, Woodz, Nathan)	jiminxjamie	Yes	Vernon, Woodz, Nathan, Park Ji-min	Yes	Vernon, Woodz, Nathan, Park Ji-min
2018	"Let Me Go Back" (되돌려 놔줘)	Jung Dong-ha	Crossroad	Yes	Benefits all humankind, MetDoeJi	No	—N/a
2018	"Bad"	Kriz (ft. Woodz)	Digital Single	Yes	Woodz, Kriz, PIGMA	Yes	Woodz, Kriz
2018	"That Season You Were In" (네가 있던 계절)	A Train To Autumn	Digital Single	Yes	Benefits all humankind, MetDoeJi	No	—N/a
2018	"Dear Dawn" (새벽아)	Jisu	Digital Single	Yes	—N/a	No	—N/a
2019	"Designer"	M.FECT	Digital Single	Yes	Benefits all humankind, MetDoeJi	No	—N/a
2019	"Always Difficult Always Beautiful"	Wooseok	9801	Yes	Wooseok	Yes	Nathan, Wooseok
2019	"1 Sided Love"	Kriz (ft. Kino)	Digital Single	Yes	Kriz, Dart	Yes	Kriz
2019	"Gaze On You" (바라보다)	Namhyuk	Digital Single	Yes	Namhyuk	Yes	Benefits all humankind, MetDoeJi, Gayeoni
2019	"Calling You" (이제와 무슨 소용 있겠냐고)	Han Seung-hee	Digital Single	No	—N/a	Yes	Benefits all humankind, MetDoeJi, Gayeoni
2019	"Hard To Love"	Kriz (ft. Kino)	Digital Single	Yes	Kriz, P!bee, Roe Poet	Yes	Kriz, Dart
2019	"Fine"	XST	Digital Single	Yes	MetDoeJi, Kim Tae-hong, XST	No	—N/a
2020	"Gravity"	Jinho (ft. Kino)	—N/a	Yes	—N/a	Yes	Benefits all humankind, Gayeoni
2020	"Shine Bright" (찬란하게 빛날 거예요)	Lee Soo-young	Kkondae Intern OST Part 4	No	—N/a	Yes	Kim Tae-hong, MetDoeJi, Gayeoni
2021	"Don't play me love"	Davii (ft. Kino)	Don't play me love	No	—N/a	Yes	Davii, Im Min-ki, 2xxx
2021	"Atlantis"	A.C.E	Siren:Dawn	Yes	—N/a	Yes	Kriz, Jake K (ARTiffect)
2022	"My Lilac" (나의 라일락)	Kim Dae-geon	Digital Single	Yes	—N/a	Yes	MetDoeJi, Kim Zion, Gayeoni
2022	"Relax"	Lee Ji-hae	Digital Single	Yes	—N/a	Yes	MetDoeJi, Kim Zion, Gayeoni
2022	"Ring" (반지)	Park Min-ji	Digital Single	Yes	Kim Zion, Handam	Yes	Kim Zion, Gayeoni, Handam
2023	"Maze"	Handam	Digital Single	Yes	Handam	No	—N/a
2025	"Flake"	Garzón Robie (ft. Kino)	Digital Single	Yes	Garzón Robie	Yes	Garzón Robie, Preux

== See also ==
- List of songs recorded by Pentagon
