= Emi Fujita =

Japanese singer (born 1963)

Emi Fujita (藤田恵美, Fujita Emi; born May 15, 1963) is a Japanese singer. She debuted as a singer with her husband Ryuji Fujita as the duo Le Couple. Their first album was released in 1994. Fujita made her solo debut in 2001. Her series of Camomile CDs are covers of popular western songs. Rembrandt Sky is her first original album, a collaboration with music producers Toshiyuki Mori, Seiji Kameda and Yoshiyuki Sahashi. Several of her solo albums have charted in Japan, including Camomile Best Audio, which reached number 27 on the Oricon chart. She has also found some success in Southeast Asia.

Emi and Ryuji divorced in February 2007.

== Discography ==
=== Albums ===
- Camomile (2001)
- Camomile Extra (2002)
- Camomile Blend (2003)
- Lullaby of Camomile: Live in Singapore (2005)
- Rembrandt Sky / Emi with MKB (2005)
- Camomile Classics (2006)
- Camomile Plus (2007)
- Camomile Best Audio (2007)
- Kokoro no Shokutaku (2008)
- Mona Pizza's Song (2008)
- Lullaby of Camomile: Concert 2008 HK Special Version LPCD45 (2008)
- Camomile Smile (2010)

=== Singles ===
- "Yumemiru Asa" (2001)
- "Kageboushi" (2005)
- "Rainbow Bridge" (2007)
