= Le Couple =

Japanese musical duo

Le Couple (ル・クプル, ru kupuru) was a Japanese band consisting of wife and husband duo Emi Fujita (singer) and Ryuji Fujita (guitarist). Both members were born in 1963—Emi on May 15 and Ryuji on November 7.

The band's debut single was Umi no Soko de Utau Uta (unofficial translation: "The Song To Sing At The Bottom Of The Ocean") released in July 1994. Le Couple is famous for their song Hidamari No Uta which was part of the soundtrack for the 1997 Japanese TV drama series Under One Roof 2. The CD single sold over 1.8 million copies. After the band suspended its activities, Emi Fujita started her solo debut in November 2001, with the album Camomile.

The couple divorced in February 2007.

== See also ==
- List of best-selling singles in Japan
