= In:vite U =

- Digital cover

EP by Pentagon
- Released: January 24, 2022
- Genre: K-pop
- Length: 18:59
- Language: Korean
- Label: Cube
- Producers: Ryan S. Jhun; Kristin Marie; Vegard Hurum; Jop Pangemanan; Wooseok; Nathan; Shinwon; MILLENIUM; yunji; Hoho; Kino; Kim Si-on; Milano; Son Yo-seb; Hyeogdu Choi; Roamer Doze; siixk Jun

Pentagon chronology
Do or Not (2021)	In:vite U (2022)	Feelin' Like (2022)

Pentagon EP chronology
Do or Not (2021)	In:vite U (2022)	Feelin' Like (2022)

Singles from In:vite U
- 1. "Feelin' Like" Released: January 24, 2022

In:vite U is the twelfth Korean extended play by South Korean boy group Pentagon. It was released on January 24, 2022, by Cube Entertainment and Universal Music. In:vite U topped the Gaon Albums Chart within the month of its release, making it Pentagon's first No. 1 album in South Korea. The physical album is available in two versions: Nouveau and Flare.

== Commercial performance ==
In:vite U topped iTunes Top Albums chart in 30 regions around the world, including Spain, Mexico, Russia, Brazil, and Poland. The album's title track “Feelin’ Like” also reached No. 1 on iTunes’ Top Song charts in 11 regions, including Peru, Ecuador, Brazil, Mexico, Argentina, and Colombia. The album charted at No. 1 on the Gaon Albums Chart, making it Pentagon's first album to achieve the feat. The lead single "Feelin' Like" opened at No. 98 on the Gaon Digital Chart, and topped the Gaon Download chart. In addition, the remaining songs on In:vite U all charted at various spots on the Gaon Download chart.

According to Hanteo, In:vite U sold 76,996 copies in its first week of release (January 24 to 30), making it Pentagon's highest first-week sales yet, breaking their previous record of 70,731 with Love or Take.

== Track listing ==
In:vite U track listing
No.	Title	Lyrics	Music	Arrangement	Length
1.	"Feelin' Like"	HAEE; Kino; Jinho; Wooseok	Ryan S. Jhun; Kristin Marie; Vegard Hurum; Jop Pangemanan	Ryan S. Jhun; Vegard Hurum	2:47
2.	"One Shot" (한탕)	Wooseok; Shinwon	Wooseok; Nathan; Shinwon	Nathan; MILLENIUM	3:12
3.	"The Game"	Wooseok	Wooseok; Nathan; yunji; Hoho	Nathan; yunji	3:04
4.	"Call My Name"	Kino; HAEE; Wooseok	Kino; Kim Si-on; Milano	Kim Si-on; Son Yo-seb; Hyeogdu Choi	3:34
5.	"Sparkling Night" (관람차)	Kino; Wooseok	Kino; Roamer Doze	Roamer Doze	2:56
6.	"Bad"	Wooseok	Wooseok; siixk Jun	siixk Jun	3:25
Total length:					18:59

== Accolades ==
Year-end lists for In:vite U
Critic/Publication	List	Rank	Note(s)	Ref.
Clash	The 20 Best K-Pop B-Sides From 2022	Placed	"Sparkling Night"	

Music Program Awards for In:vite U
Program	Network	Date	Ref.
Music Bank	KBS2	February 4, 2022	

== Charts ==
=== Weekly charts ===
Chart performance for In:vite U
Chart (2022)	Peak position
Japanese Albums (Oricon)	16
Japanese Hot Albums (Billboard Japan)	61
South Korean Albums (Gaon)	1

=== Monthly charts ===
Monthly chart performance for In:vite U
Chart (2022)	Peak position
Japanese Albums (Oricon)	39
South Korean Albums (Gaon)	10
