= Ceremony (EP) =

EP by Pentagon
- Released: June 12, 2017
- Genre: K-pop
- Length: 26:00
- Language: Korean
- Labels: Cube Entertainment; LOEN Entertainment

Pentagon chronology
Gorilla (2017)	Ceremony (2017)	Demo 01 (2017)

Pentagon Korean chronology
Five Senses (2016)	Ceremony (2017)	Demo 01 (2017)

Singles from Ceremony
- 1. "Beautiful" Released: May 18, 2017; 2. "Critical Beauty" Released: June 12, 2017

Music videos
- "예뻐죽겠네(Critical Beauty)" on YouTube
- "To Universe" on YouTube

Ceremony is the third extended play from South Korean boy band Pentagon. It was released on June 12, 2017, by Cube Entertainment. The album consists of seven tracks, including the title track, "Critical Beauty".

== Commercial performance ==
The EP sold 23,111+ copies in South Korea. It peaked at number 6 on the Korean Gaon Chart.

== Track listing ==
Official track list
No.	Title	Lyrics	Music	Arrangement	Length
1.	"Critical Beauty" (예뻐죽겠네)	Park Woo-hyun	Olivier 'Akos' Castelli; Justin Stein	Olivier 'Akos' Castelli	3:17
2.	"Lucky"	Roydo; Shin Kong; BreadBeat	Shin Kong; BreadBeat	Shin Kong; BreadBeat	3:24
3.	"To Universe" (소중한 약속)	Jinho; E'Dawn; Yuto; Wooseok	Ferdy; Jinho	Ferdy	3:44
4.	"Nothing"	Seo Jae-woo; Kang Dong-ha; Ra Young-ssi; Yuto; E'Dawn; Wooseok	Seo Jae-woo; Kang Dong-ha	Seo Jae-woo; Kang Dong-ha	3:34
5.	"Spectacular" (스펙터클 해)	Son Young-jin; Jo Sung-ho; E'Dawn; Yuto; Wooseok	Son Young-jin; Jo Sung-ho	Son Young-jin; Jo Sung-ho	3:34
6.	"Thank You" (고마워) (sung by Jinho, Hui)	Hui	Hui	Son Young-jin	4:16
7.	"Beautiful"	Jung Il-hoon; IL	Jung Il-hoon; IL	IL; Jung Il-hoon	3:43
Total length:					26:00

== Charts ==
Chart (2017)	Peak position
South Korean Albums (Gaon)	6
US World Albums (Billboard)	14
