= Do or Not (EP) =

2021 EP by Pentagon

- Type C and digital cover

EP by Pentagon
- Released: June 14, 2021
- Recorded: 2020–2021
- Genre: J-pop
- Language: Japanese
- Labels: Cube; Universal Music Japan
- Producers: Hui; Nathan; Wooseok; yunji; Kino; Houdini; Yuto; Hong So-jin

Pentagon chronology
Love or Take (2021)	Do or Not (2021)	In:vite U (2022)

Pentagon Japanese chronology
Universe: The History (2020)	Do or Not (2021)	Feelin' Like (2022)

Alternative cover
- Type A

- Type B

Singles from Do or Not
- 1. "Daisy (Japanese ver.)" Released: October 28, 2020; 2. "Do or Not (Japanese ver.)" Released: June 14, 2021

Do or Not (stylized as DO or NOT) is the fourth Japanese extended play by South Korean boy group Pentagon, released by Universal Music Japan and Cube Entertainment. Originally set to be released on June 23, 2021, the EP was released digitally on June 14, 2021, with physical editions still released on June 23. The EP contains Japanese versions of songs previously released "Do or Not", "Daisy" and "Boy In Time", as well as two original Japanese tracks, "Don't Worry 'Bout Me" and "Dazzling" which were composed by members Kino and Yuto, respectively.

== Background ==
On May 12, Cube Entertainment announced that Pentagon will release their 4th mini album Do or Not in Japan on June 23. Starting May 13, Pentagon individual images were posted on their official Japan Twitter account. On May 20, Universal Music Japan revealed the album's tracklist through their website. It will be released in three versions: limited edition A with a 40 pages photo book, limited edition B with a 28 pages photo book, and the regular edition with only a CD containing all 5 songs. An audio snippet of the mini album, briefly showcasing each track, was released on June 9. On June 11, it was announced that Do or Not would be pre-released digitally on June 14, while the release date for the physical versions of the EP would remain the same.

== Track listing ==
Credits adapted from Apple Music and Melon.

No.	Title	Lyrics	Music	Arrangement	Length
1.	"Do or Not" (Japanese version)	Hui; Wooseok; Shoko Fujibayashi	Hui; Nathan; Wooseok	Nathan	3:08
2.	"Daisy" (Japanese version)	Hui; Wooseok; Shoko Fujibayashi	Hui; Nathan; Wooseok	Nathan; yunji	3:09
3.	"Don't Worry 'Bout Me"	Kino; Yuto; Wooseok; Shoko Fujibayashi	Kino; Nathan	Nathan	3:32
4.	"Dazzling" (眩しい君と)	Yuto; Houdini; KushitaMine	Houdini; Yuto	Houdini; Yuto	3:10
5.	"Boy In Time" (Hui solo Japanese version)	Hui; Ryuji Fujita; Aki Fujita	Hui	Hong So-jin	3:38
Total length:					16:37

Limited Edition Type A (CD＋Photobook 40P)
No.	Title	Length
1.	"Do or Not" (Japanese version)
2.	"Daisy" (Japanese version)
3.	"Don't Worry 'Bout Me"
4.	"Boy In Time" (Hui solo Japanese version)

Limited Edition Type B (CD＋PHOTOBOOK 28P)
No.	Title	Length
1.	"Do or Not" (Japanese version)
2.	"Daisy" (Japanese version)
3.	"Dazzling"
4.	"Boy In Time" (Hui solo Japanese version)

Regular Edition (CD)
No.	Title	Length
1.	"Do or Not" (Japanese version)
2.	"Daisy" (Japanese version)
3.	"Don't Worry 'Bout Me"
4.	"Dazzling"
5.	"Boy In Time" (Hui solo Japanese version)

== Charts ==
Chart performance for Do or Not
Chart (2021)	Peak position
Japanese Albums (Oricon)	12
Japan Hot Albums (Billboard Japan)	10

== Release history ==
Release history and formats for Do or Not
Region	Date	Format	Distributor	Ref.
Japan	June 14, 2021	Digital download	Cube, Universal Music Japan	
Various	June 14, 2021	Digital download	Cube, Universal Music Japan	
Japan	June 23, 2021	CD	Cube, Universal Music Japan	
Various	June 23, 2021	CD	Cube, Universal Music Japan	
