= Universe: The History =

- Type C and digital cover

Studio album by Pentagon
- Released: September 23, 2020
- Recorded: 2017–2020
- Genre: J-pop
- Language: Japanese
- Label: Cube; U-Cube

Pentagon chronology
Universe: The Black Hall (2020)	Universe: The History (2020)	We:th (2020)

Pentagon Japanese chronology
Shine (2018)	Universe: The History (2020)	Do or Not (2021)

Alternative cover
- Type A

- Type B

Singles from Universe: The History
- 1. "Dr. Bebe (Japanese Ver.)" Released: September 14, 2020

Universe: The History (stylized in all caps) is the second studio album and debut Japanese album release by South Korean boy group Pentagon. The album was released on September 23, 2020, containing Japanese songs from their debut mini album Gorilla and debut singles "Cosmo" and "Happiness / Sha La La". Member Jinho participated in the activities before enlisted for his mandatory military service on May 11, 2020.

== Background and release ==
Starting July 20, 2020, Pentagon individual images with the phrase "PENTAGON 2020.07.28 TUE 5PM" were posted on their official Japan Twitter account. However, the purpose of the teaser image was not clarified. On July 28, it was confirmed that the group will release their first full-length Japanese album Universe: The History.

On August 4, Pentagon released jacket photos of their first studio album Universe: The History through their website. It was released in three versions: a limited edition A with a DVD containing a 60-minute movie "Spring Story", a limited edition B with a 100-page photo book, and a regular edition with a CD only. In addition, the 8 solo version of each member will be released in a total of 11 formats.

On September 9, Pentagon unveiled the song "Dr. Bebe (Japanese Ver.)" on Teru's radio program TERU ME NIGHT GLAY. The song was officially released through various streaming platforms on September 14. Accompanying the album release was a live performance video of "Dr. Bebe (Japanese Ver.)".

== Track listing ==
Official track list
No.	Title	Lyrics	Music	Arrangement	Length
1.	"Gorilla" (2020 Japanese Ver.)	Seo Ji-eum; Yuto; Samuelle Soung	Gavin Jones; Ali Zackowski; Harry Sommerdah	Gavin Jones; Ali Zackowski; Harry Sommerdah	3:05
2.	"Can You Feel It" (2020 Japanese Ver.)	Son Young-jin; Ferdy; Samuelle Soung	Son Young-jin; Ferdy	Son Young-jin; Ferdy	3:18
3.	"Pretty Pretty" (2020 Japanese Ver.)	Seo Ji-eum; Yu-ki Kokubo	Daniel Caesar; Ludwig Lindell	Daniel Caesar; Ludwig Lindell	3:09
4.	"To Universe" (Japanese Ver.)	Jinho; E'Dawn; Yuto; Wooseok; Ryuji Fujita	Ferdy; Jinho	Ferdy	3:44
5.	"Violet" (2020 Japanese Ver.)	Kino; E'Dawn; Yuto; Wooseok; Yu Shimoji	Kino; NATHAN	Kino; NATHAN	3:55
6.	"Shine" (2020 Japanese Ver.)	E'Dawn; Hui; Yuto; Wooseok; Shōko Fujibayashi	Flow Blow; Hui; E'Dawn	Flow Blow	3:18
7.	"Cosmo"	Teru; Yuto	Teru		4:07
8.	"Naughty Boy" (Japanese Ver.)	E'Dawn; Hui; Yuto; Wooseok; Shōko Fujibayashi	Flow Blow; Hui; E'Dawn	Flow Blow	3:17
9.	"Happiness"	Kino; Yuto; KushitaMine	Kino; Benefits all Humankind; MetDoeJi	Benefits all Humankind; MetDoeJi; Ga Yeon E	3:25
10.	"Sha La La" (Japanese Ver.)	Hui; Wooseok; Shōko Fujibayashi	Hui; Han Yo-Han; Minit	Han Yo-Han; Minit	3:15
11.	"Humph!" (Japanese Ver.)	Hui; Giriboy; Wooseok; Shōko Fujibayashi	Giriboy; Hui	Giriboy	3:13
12.	"Dr. Bebe" (Japanese Ver.)	Hui; Wooseok; Shōko Fujibayashi	Hui; NATHAN; Yunji	NATHAN; Yunji	3:12
Total length:					40:58

First press limited edition A DVD
No.	Title	Length
1.	"Spring Story" (Special movie)

First press limited edition B DVD
No.	Title	Length
1.	"100P photo book"

== Commercial performance ==
Universe: The History was ranked 2nd on the Oricon Daily Album Chart and 3rd on the iTunes K-Pop Album Chart on the day of its release.

== Charts ==
Chart (2020)	Peak position
Japanese Albums (Oricon)	7
Japan Hot Albums (Billboard Japan)	8

== Certifications and sales ==
Region	Certification	Certified units/sales
Japan	—	16,235

== Release history ==
Region	Date	Format	Distributor
Various	September 23, 2020	Digital download	Cube, Universal Music Japan
Japan	September 23, 2020	Digital download	Cube, Universal Music Japan
Japan	September 23, 2020	CD	Cube, Universal Music Japan
