= Thumbs Up! (EP) =

EP by Pentagon
- Released: September 10, 2018
- Genre: K-pop
- Length: 17:35
- Language: Korean
- Label: Cube Entertainment; Kakao M

Pentagon chronology
Shine (2018)	Thumbs Up! (2018)	Genie:us (2019)

Pentagon Korean chronology
Positive (2018)	Thumbs Up! (2018)	Genie:us (2019)

Singles from Thumbs Up!
- 1. "Naughty Boy" Released: September 10, 2018

Music video
- "청개구리(Naughty Boy)" on YouTube

Thumbs Up! is the seventh extended play from South Korean boy band Pentagon. It was released on September 10, 2018, by Cube Entertainment. The album consists of five tracks, including the lead single, "Naughty Boy".

This is the first project from the group to not feature all ten members, in which Yan An and E'Dawn were absent from the comeback, over health concerns and a dating scandal respectively. While he didn't provide his vocals for the album, E'Dawn participated in the composition of several tracks. It was later announced that E'Dawn would be leaving Pentagon on November 14, while Yan An would resume his activities with the group on November 25.

== Commercial performance ==
The EP debuted at number ten on the Korean Gaon Chart in September 2018. The EP sold over 21,585 units in September.

== Track listing ==
Thumbs Up!
No.	Title	Lyrics	Music	Arrangement	Length
1.	"Naughty Boy" (청개구리)	E'Dawn; Hui; Yuto; Wooseok	Flow Blow; Hui; E'Dawn	Flow Blow	3:19
2.	"Just Do It Yo!!" (저두요!!)	Hui; Shinwon; Kino; Yuto; Wooseok	Hui; Shinwon; Ferdy (MosPick)	Ferdy (MosPick)	3:19
3.	"Skateboard"	Kino; Wooseok; E'Dawn; Yuto	Kino; NATHAN	NATHAN	3:04
4.	"When It Rains at Night" (밤에 비가 내리면)	Kino; Wooseok; Yuto	Kino; 멧돼지; 홍익인간	멧돼지; 홍익인간	4:05
5.	"Thumbs Up!"	Hui; Wooseok	Hui; The Proof	The Proof	3:47
Total length:					17:35

== Accolades ==
Year-end lists
Critic/Publication	List	Nominated work	Rank	Ref.
Billboard	20 Best K-pop Albums of 2018: Critics' Picks	Thumbs Up!	7	
MTV	18 Best K-pop B-sides of 2018	"When It Rains at Night"	11	
SBS PopAsia	Top 100 Asian pop songs of 2018	"Naughty Boy"	83	

== Charts ==
Chart (2018)	Peak position
South Korean Albums (Gaon)	4
