= Demo 01 =

Demo_01

EP by Pentagon
- Released: September 6, 2017
- Recorded: 2017
- Genre: K-pop
- Length: 17:06
- Language: Korean
- Labels: Cube Entertainment; LOEN Entertainment
- Producers: Flow Blow; Hui; Kino; Ferdy; Jinho; E'Dawn; Yuto; Wooseok; Son Young-jin; Kang Dong-ha

Pentagon chronology
Ceremony (2017)	Demo_01 (2017)	Demo_02 (2017)

Singles from Demo 01
- 1. "Like This" Released: September 6, 2017

Music videos
- "Like This" on YouTube
- "설렘이라는 건 (When I Was In Love)" on YouTube

Demo_01 is the fourth extended play from South Korean boy band Pentagon. It was released on September 6, 2017, by Cube Entertainment. The album consists of five tracks, including the title track, "Like This".

== Release and promotion ==
Demo_01 was first announced on August 25, 2017 with a release date of September 6. Beginning on August 29, various teasers were unveiled in order to promote the mini-album. A set of teaser photos of each member, as well as a group shot, were published.

== Commercial performance ==
On the chart dated September 3–9, 2017, Demo_01 debuted at number eight on South Korea's national Gaon Album Chart. By the end of the month, the record shifted 13,759 units domestically.

== Track listing ==
No.	Title	Lyrics	Music	Arrangement	Length
1.	"Like This"	Hui; E'Dawn; Yuto; Wooseok	Flow Blow; Hui	Flow Blow	3:47
2.	"It's Over"	Kino; E'Dawn; Wooseok	Kino	Ferdy; Kino	3:49
3.	"One More Night" (오늘까지만)	Ferdy; Jinho; E'Dawn; Yuto; Wooseok	Ferdy; Jinho	Ferdy	3:36
4.	"Get That Drink" (멋있게랩) (sung by rap unit)	E'Dawn; Yuto; Wooseok	E'Dawn; Yuto; Wooseok	E'Dawn	2:54
5.	"When I Was in Love" (설렘이라는건)	Hui; E'Dawn; Yuto; Wooseok	Hui	Son Young-jin; Kang Dong-ha	3:40
Total length:					17:06

== Charts ==
Chart (2017)	Peak position
Gaon Album Chart	8
Oricon Albums Chart	99

== Release history ==
List of release dates, showing region, edition, formats, label, and reference
Region	Date	Format(s)	Label	Ref.
South Korea	September 6, 2017	Digital download	Cube; LOEN	
South Korea	September 8, 2017	CD	Cube; LOEN	
