= Genie:us =

EP by Pentagon
- Released: March 27, 2019
- Genre: K-pop
- Length: 22:47
- Language: Korean
- Label: Cube Entertainment; Kakao M
- Producer: Hui; Han Yo-Han; Minit; Yuto; Kino; Wooseok; NATHAN; Mospick; The Proof; HOHO; Jinho; Hongseok; Shinwon; Yeo One; Yan An

Pentagon chronology
Thumbs Up! (2018)	Genie:us (2019)	Sum(me:r) (2019)

Singles from Genie:us
- 1. "Sha La La" Released: March 27, 2019

Music video
- "신토불이(SHA LA LA)" on YouTube

Genie:us is the eighth Korean-language mini album from South Korean boy band Pentagon. It was released on March 27, 2019 by Cube Entertainment. The album consists of six tracks, with "Sha La La" serving as the album's title track. This is the first Korean-language EP the band has released as a nine-member group, with original member E’Dawn departing the group in late 2018, as well as the first album not to involve E'Dawn in any capacity. (Note: E'Dawn wrote and produced several tracks in Thumbs Up, despite not promoting the album.) Member Kino did not participate in stage promotions for "Sha La La" due to an ankle injury he suffered in January. Starting on April 16, 2019, the group promoted the song "Spring Snow" for a week, for which Kino was able to participate in.

== Name ==
The album name is a portmanteau of the words "genie", from the story of Aladdin, and "us" to create "genius". The title of the project has the connotation that "all people have talents that make them genius in their own field".

The title of the album has dual meanings. First, it aims to give the confidence that we all can be a genius. The other reflects our wish to become a genie from a magic lamp.

— Leader Hui on the album's title.

== Background and release ==
On March 15, 2019, Pentagon announced the title and release date of their eighth Korean-language mini album. The lead single "Sha La La" was teased in videos on March 18 and 19, although the title was unknown at the time. A time schedule of the comeback was released on March 19. The track list was released on March 20, and their concert "2019 Pentagon Concert - PRISM", to be held on April 27 and 28 in Seoul, was announced on the same day. Concept images were released on March 21 and 22. The audio teaser for the mini-album was released on March 25, and the music video teaser for "Sha La La" was released the next day. The music video was released on March 27 alongside the album. On the same day, a media showcase was held to commemorate the release of the mini-album at Blue Square iMarket Hall in Yongsan-gu, Seoul.

== Musicality ==
The group continues their image as a self-producing idol group, as each song on the album was produced by the members and all members are credited as writers and producers. The songs on the album are filled with messages aimed to excite, comfort, encourage, and give hope to the listeners.

When we staged our first album during a (local) music competition show, we almost broke the floor. We made a crack on the stage because we were so full of energy and ambition... We want to bring back the vigor, passion and confidence with this latest music. That's the whole point of this album.

— Hui on the album's meaning.

=== Songs ===
"Sha La La" is a future house track with elements of hip hop and rock. The Korean title (신토불이) is an abbreviation of the phrase "신나는 토요일 불타는 이밤", which translates to "let’s light up this Saturday night". The song contains witty lyrics and dynamic dance sounds that aim to ease stress. Billboard highlighted the track's "vibrant soundscape that puts the emphasis on Pentagon’s multi-faceted vocal delivery". Leader Hui said, "You might have moments of stress and feelings of suffocation on your way from work and in school. I wrote the song to resolve them".

"Lost Paradise (Hip Hop Unit)" is a dark hip hop track sung by Hui, Yuto, Kino, and Wooseok, all of whom wrote and composed the song. The members tell their past selves that they are too young to be worried about failure. The tracks spreads the hopeful message that, regardless of one's struggles, a paradise exists within one's self. "Till... (Ballad Unit)" is a ballad sung by Jinho, Hongseok, Shinwon, Yeo One, and Yan An. The piano sounds at the beginning and the full band towards the end enhance the song's theme of perseverance. "Alien" is a witty hip hop track wherein Pentagon expresses their wishes to become a group with a unique, alien-like personality. "Spring Snow" is happy, exciting alternative rock song about the group's experience during the spring of 2018. In the final track, "Round 1", the members playfully diss each other with inside jokes. Every member of Pentagon had a hand in writing and producing the song.

== Track listing ==
Genie:us
No.	Title	Lyrics	Music	Arrangement	Length
1.	"Sha La La" (신토불이)	Hui; Wooseok	Hui; Han Yo-Han; Minit	Han Yo-han; Minit	3:15
2.	"Lost Paradise (Hip Hop Unit)"	Hui; Yuto; Kino; Wooseok	Hui; Yuto; Kino; Wooseok; NATHAN	NATHAN	3:43
3.	"Till... (Ballad Unit)" (그 순간 그때까지)	Hui	Hui; MosPick	MosPick	4:34
4.	"Alien" (에일리언)	Hui; Shinwon; Yuto; Wooseok	Hui; The Proof	The Proof	3:20
5.	"Spring Snow" (봄눈)	Kino; Yuto; Wooseok	Kino; NATHAN; HOHO	NATHAN; HOHO	4:01
6.	"Round 1" (Bonus Track)	Jinho; Hui; Hongseok; Shinwon; Yeo One; Yan An; Yuto; Kino; Wooseok	Jinho; Hui; Hongseok; Shinwon; Yeo One; Yan An; Yuto; Kino; Wooseok; MosPick	MosPick	3:54
Total length:					22:47

== Accolades ==
Year-end lists
Critic/Publication	List	Rank	Work	Ref.
Refinery29	The Best K-Pop Songs Of 2019	22	"Sha La La"	

Awards
Year	Organization	Category	Result	Ref.
2019	Seoul Music Awards	Popular Award	Nominated	
2019	Seoul Music Awards	K-Wave Award	Nominated	

== Charts ==
Chart (2019)	Peak position
South Korean Albums (Gaon)	5
US World Albums (Billboard)	15

== Certifications and sales ==
Region	Certification	Certified units/sales
South Korea	—	40,160
