= Demo 02 =

Demo_02

EP by Pentagon
- Released: November 22, 2017
- Genre: K-pop
- Length: 19:00
- Language: Korean
- Labels: Cube Entertainment; LOEN Entertainment
- Producers: Kino; Nathan; Flow Blow; Hui; Son Young-jin; Jinho; E'Dawn; Wooseok; Yuto; Big Sancho; Kang Dong-ha

Pentagon chronology
| Demo_01 (2017) | Demo_02 (2017) | Violet (2018) |

Pentagon Korean chronology
| Demo_01 (2017) | Demo_02 (2017) | Positive (2018) |

Singles from Demo_02
- 1. "Stay" Released: November 14, 2017; 2. "Runaway" Released: November 22, 2017

Music videos
- "RUNAWAY" on YouTube
- "Violet" on YouTube

Demo_02 is the fifth extended play from South Korean boy band Pentagon. It was released on November 22, 2017, by Cube Entertainment. The album consists of five tracks, including the title track, "Runaway".

== Background ==
On November 9, 2017, it was announced that Pentagon would release their fifth Korean mini album, Demo_02, on November 22. A teaser image featuring all ten members was also released, and it was confirmed that the album would contain self-composed songs. The following day, the promotional schedule for the album was released on social media. Concept images were released on November 13. Pentagon surprise released the song "Stay" by the group's vocal unit on November 14. Two days later, the track listing was released, revealing that all songs were composed by members of the group. On November 20, Pentagon released the highlight medley, showing snippets of each song.

On the afternoon of the album's release, Pentagon held a media showcase at Blue Square iMarket Hall in Hannam-dong, Yongsan-gu, Seoul.

== Commercial performance ==
The EP sold 23,257+ copies in South Korea. It peaked at number 8 on the Korean Gaon Chart.

== Track listing ==
Official track list
| No. | Title | Lyrics | Music | Arrangement | Length |
|---|---|---|---|---|---|
| 1. | "Violet" | Kino; E'Dawn; Yuto; Wooseok | Kino; Nathan | Nathan | 3:56 |
| 2. | "Runaway" | Hui; E'Dawn; Yuto; Wooseok | Flow Blow; Hui | Flow Blow | 3:25 |
| 3. | "All Right" | Son Young-jin; Jinho; E'Dawn; Yuto; Wooseok | Son Young-jin; Jinho | Son Young-jin | 3:12 |
| 4. | "Pretty Boys" (Rap Unit) | E'Dawn; Wooseok; Yuto | E'Dawn; Wooseok; Yuto | Big Sancho; E'Dawn | 3:42 |
| 5. | "Stay" (머물러줘) (Vocal Unit) | Hui | Hui | Son Young-jin; Kang Dong-ha | 4:05 |
| Total length: | | | | | 19:00 |

== Charts ==
| Chart (2017) | Peak position |
|---|---|
| South Korean Albums (Gaon) | 8 |
