= Positive (EP) =

EP by Pentagon
- Released: April 2, 2018
- Genre: K-pop
- Length: 20:00
- Language: Korean
- Label: Cube Entertainment; Kakao M
- Producer: Kang Dong-Ha; Kino; Flow Blow; Hui; E'Dawn; Jinho; Son Young-jin; Jo Sung-ho

Pentagon chronology
Violet (2018)	Positive (2018)	Shine (2018)

Pentagon Korean chronology
Demo 02 (2017)	Positive (2018)	Thumbs Up! (2018)

Singles from Positive
- 1. "Shine" Released: April 2, 2018

Music video
- "Shine" on YouTube

Positive is the sixth extended play from South Korean boy band Pentagon. It was released on April 2, 2018, by Cube Entertainment. The album consists of six tracks, including the title track "Shine".

Positive is the last Korean EP to feature E'Dawn due to his hiatus and subsequent departure from the group.

After seven months and nine days, on November 11, "Shine" music video surpassed 100 million combined views for the official music video uploaded on 1theK's channel and PENTAGON's official channel.

== Commercial performance ==
The EP debuted at number seven on the Korean Gaon Chart in April 2018, and peaked at number six the following month.

== Track listing ==
Positive
No.	Title	Lyrics	Music	Arrangement	Length
1.	"Off-Road"	Kino; E'Dawn; Yuto; Wooseok	Kang Dong-Ha; Kino	Kang Dong-Ha	3:45
2.	"Shine" (빛나리)	E'Dawn; Hui; Yuto; Wooseok	Flow Blow; Hui; E'Dawn	Flow Blow	3:18
3.	"Think About You" (생각해)	Jinho; Kang Dong-ha; E'Dawn; Yuto; Wooseok	Kang Dong-Ha; Jinho	Kang Dong-Ha	3:41
4.	"Do It for Fun" (재밌겠다) (sung by rap unit)	E'Dawn; Wooseok; Yuto	E'Dawn; Kang Dong-Ha	E'Dawn; Kang Dong-Ha	3:10
5.	"Nothing I Can Do" (보낼 수밖에)	Son Young-jin; Jo Sung-ho; E'Dawn; Wooseok	Son Young-jin; Jo Sung-ho	Son Young-jin; Jo Sung-ho	3:46
6.	"Let's Go Together" (함께 가자 우리)	Kang Dong-Ha; E'Dawn; Wooseok	Kang Dong-Ha; E'Dawn	Kang Dong-Ha	3:18
Total length:					20:00

== Accolades ==
Awards for Positive
Year	Organization	Award	Result	Ref.
2019	Golden Disc Awards	Album Daesang	Nominated	

== Charts ==
Chart (2018)	Peak position
South Korean Albums (Gaon)	6
US World Albums (Billboard)	10
