= Love or Take =

- Digital and streaming cover

EP by Pentagon
- Released: March 15, 2021
- Genre: K-pop; R&B; funk
- Length: 21:07
- Language: Korean
- Label: Cube
- Producer: Hui; Wooseok; chAN's; Darm; Nathan; Kino; Hoho; LDN Noise; Cazzi Opeia; Gabriel Brandes; Nomal (Party in my pool); Hong So-jin

Pentagon chronology
We:th (2020)	Love or Take (2021)	Do or Not (2021)

Pentagon EP chronology
We:th (2020)	Love or Take (2021)	Do or Not (2021)

Physical edition cover
- Mild, Sporty and Romantic versions, left to right

Singles from Love or Take
- 1. "Do or Not" Released: March 15, 2021

Music video
- "DO or NOT" on YouTube

Love or Take (stylized as LOVE or TAKE) is the eleventh Korean extended play by South Korean boy group Pentagon. It was released on March 15, 2021, by Cube Entertainment and Universal Music. Member Hui participated in the album's writing and recording process, but did not take part in promotional activities due to serving his mandatory military enlistment. The physical album is available in three versions: Romantic, Sporty and Mild.

== Background ==
In mid-February 2021, it was reported that Pentagon would be making a comeback three months after the special single "Eternal Flame" released in December 2020. Album recording and music video shooting for the lead single "Do or Not" took place before Hui's enlistment on February 18. On February 26, Cube released the promotional schedule for the album through their official homepage and social media. From March 2–5, Pentagon released preview images of the illustrated version of concept photos showing the synchronization of the members' costumes and poses. On March 8, the group released the highlight medley for the album. On March 15, the group held an online media showcase to commemorate the release of Love or Take, during which they performed "Baby I Love You" and the lead track "Do Or Not", marking the start of their full-scale promotions.

== Artwork and packaging ==
Pentagon released three physical album versions of Love or Take. The album packaging resembles manhwa novels, with illustrated covers and booklets unique to each version. In "Romantic" version, Pentagon shows eight colours, with eight people under a pink background to create a romantic mood. In "Sporty" version, the group showed in a sporty outfit under a tennis court background with tennis balls and rackets were used as props to create a cool mood. In "Mild" version, the members shows their chic charms under a calm blue tone background in a black and white modern look to create a dreamy atmosphere. The EP has a special cover, booklet, CD, CD package, lyric paper, mini-poster, special plastic sheet, photo card, and poster which is only available for pre-order.

== Music and composition ==
The album consists of seven songs, including the bonus track "Boy In Time". The opening track, "10 Seconds Before" is a pop track about the excitement of failing in love. The second song and lead single "Do or Not" was written and produced by leader Hui, member Wooseok, and composer Nathan, the same team who created the previous lead single "Daisy" from the album We:th. It is a pop rock song reminiscent of the early-2000s that continues Pentagon's tradition of "signature refreshing songs" like "Shine", "Naughty Boy", "Spring Snow" and "Daisy", expressing the attitude of "whether I do it or not, I don’t care" with its catchy melody and lyrics. The third track, "1+1" is a R&B song about the overwhelming trembling of the moment when love blooms. The fourth track, "Baby I Love You" composed by member Kino, Nathan and Hoho, is a song with soft vocals and a soft melody. "That's Me", the fifth song, is a genre-bending track that combines elements of funk and electronic music. "Sing-a-song" is described as "full of refreshing and bright colours". The closing track, "Boy In Time" is a "sweeter and more serious love story" solo song by Hui as a gift for fans who miss him after leaving for military service.

== Critical reception ==
Professional ratings
Review scores
Source	Rating
NME	3/5 stars

Puah Ziwei of NME opined that the group "hit gold with the album's B-sides" from ""1+1", a groovy, laid-back love song" co-written by Wooseok to "romantic yet funky" "Baby I Love You" by Kino. She stated that "the two songs hint at a more low-key direction for the boyband, who are known for their high-octane, anthemic releases – one that’s infinitely more interesting than this album’s title track." She also wrote that "That's Me" track "features questionable use of Auto-Tune alongside a strange combination of electro and '80s funk-pop that confuses as much as it frustrates" and remarked that the closing song "Boy In Time", a "powerful and emotional solo farewell from Hui". She concluded her review, "the sonic success of "1+1" and "Baby I Love You" – the two songs which Hui did not partake in for Love or Take – seem to suggest that the group have already marked out a wide-open path for their future releases."

== Commercial performance ==
On March 17, Love or Take reached 52,098 copies and placed second on Hanteo Chart's daily album chart on the first day of release. The album debuted at number 3 on Gaon Album Chart, and dropped to number 19 the following week. On the third week of charting, the album rose into the top 10. The lead single "Do or Not" entered and topped Genie Music and Melon 24Hits after its release. On Bugs chart, all songs including the lead single succeeded in chart-in, making their first album to reach this milestone. The album also topped iTunes Top Albums chart in 14 countries including Guatemala, Taiwan, Malaysia and Vietnam.

== Track listing ==
Love or Take track listing
No.	Title	Lyrics	Music	Arrangement	Length
1.	"10s and" (10초 전)	Hui; Wooseok	Hui; Wooseok; chAN's; DARM	chAN's; Darm	2:53
2.	"Do or Not"	Hui; Wooseok	Hui; Nathan; Wooseok	Nathan	3:08
3.	"1+1"	Jo Yoon-kyung; Wooseok	LDN Noise; Cazzi Opeia; Gabriel Brandes	LDN Noise	2:58
4.	"Baby I Love You"	Kino; Wooseok	Kino; Nathan; Hoho	Nathan; Hoho	3:12
5.	"That's Me"	Hui; Wooseok	Hui; Wooseok; chAN's; Darm	chAN's; Darm	2:44
6.	"Sing-a-song" (Korean: 노래해; lit. Sing)	Hui; Wooseok	Hui; Wooseok; chAN's	chAN's; Nomal (Party in my pool)	2:51
7.	"Boy in Time" (소년감성) (Hui solo) (bonus track)	Hui	Hui	Hong So-jin	3:39
Total length:					21:07

== Charts ==
=== Weekly charts ===
Weekly chart performance for Love or Take
Chart (2021)	Peak position
Japan Hot Albums (Billboard Japan)	87
Japanese Albums (Oricon)	15
South Korean Albums (Gaon)	3

=== Monthly charts ===
Monthly chart performance for Love or Take
Chart (2021)	Peak position
South Korea Albums (Gaon)	8

=== Year-end charts ===
Year-end chart performance for Love or Take
Chart (2021)	Position
South Korean Albums (Gaon)	91

== Certifications and sales ==
Region	Certification	Certified units/sales
South Korea	—	112,823

== Release history ==
Release formats for Love or Take
Region	Date	Format	Distributor	Ref.
South Korea	March 15, 2021	Digital download, streaming	Cube; Kakao M	
Various	March 15, 2021	Digital download, streaming	Cube; U-Cube	
South Korea	March 16, 2021	CD	Cube; Kakao M	
Various	March 16, 2021	CD	Cube; U-Cube	
