= List of Pentagon concert tours =

Pentagon concert tours
- ↙Tours: 2
- ↙Concerts: 16
- ↙Fan meetings: 15
- ↙Showcases: 16
- ↙Others: 8

The South Korean boy band Pentagon held their debut showcase "The Museum of Pentagon" on October 16, 2016. They completed their five sets of "Pentagon Tentastic Mini Concerts" from 2016 to 2018. In 2019, Pentagon embarked on their first world tour entitled 2019 Pentagon World Tour "Prism" in April.

== Concerts ==
Date	Concert	City	Country	Venue	Attendance	Ref.
Pentagon Mini Concert Tentastic Vol.1 - Love	December 16, 2016	Seoul	Korea	Yes24 Live Hall	—N/a	
PENTAGON 1st Concert in Japan	March 24, 2017	Tokyo	Japan	Shinagawa Stellar Ball	4,000	
Pentagon Mini Concert Tentastic Vol.2 - Trust	June 10, 2017	Seoul	Korea	Shinhan Card Fan Live Hall	—N/a	
Pentagon Mini Concert Tentastic Vol.2 - Trust	June 11, 2017	Seoul	Korea	Shinhan Card Fan Live Hall	—N/a	
Pentagon Mini Concert Tentastic Vol.2 - Trust	June 12, 2017	Seoul	Korea	Shinhan Card Fan Live Hall	—N/a	
Pentagon 2017 Tentastic Live Concert in Japan	August 3, 2017	Osaka	Japan	Zepp Osaka Bayside	—N/a	
Pentagon 2017 Tentastic Live Concert in Japan	August 7, 2017	Tokyo	Japan	Tokyo Akasaka Blitz	—N/a	
Pentagon Mini Concert Tentastic Vol.3 - Promise	September 6, 2017	Seoul	Korea	Yes24 Live Hall	—N/a	
Pentagon 2017 Tentastic Live Concert in Tokyo	November 18, 2017	Tokyo	Japan		—N/a	
Pentagon Mini Concert Tentastic Vol.4 - Dream	November 23, 2017	Seoul	Korea	Blue Square I-Market Hall	—N/a	
PENTAGON! Great Live Concert in Japan 2018 Your Whiteday	March 2, 2018 (2 shows)		Japan		—N/a	
PENTAGON! Great Live Concert in Japan 2018 Your Whiteday	March 4, 2018 (2 shows)		Japan		—N/a	
Pentagon Mini Concert Tentastic Vol.5 - Miracle	April 1, 2018	Seoul	Korea	Blue Square I-Market Hall	—N/a	
2019 Pentagon concert "PRISM"	April 27, 2019	Seoul	Korea	Blue Square I-Market Hall	—N/a	
2019 Pentagon concert "PRISM"	April 28, 2019	Seoul	Korea	Blue Square I-Market Hall	—N/a	
2020 Pentagon Online Concert [WE L:VE] (Note: This was broadcast online due to concerns over the COVID-19 pandemic.)	November 29, 2020	Seoul	Korea		—N/a	

== Tours ==
Title	Dates	Associated album(s)	Continent(s)	Shows	Ref.
Dear Cosmo Tour	January 12, 2019 – February 10, 2019	Cosmo	Asia	4	
Prism World Tour	April 27, 2019 – December 21, 2019	Pentagon; Five Senses; Ceremony; Demo_01; Demo_02; Positive; Thumbs Up! Genie:us; Sum(me:r)	Asia; North America; Latin America; Europe	23	

== Fan meetings ==
Fan meeting	Date	City	Country	Venue	Attendance	Ref.
1st Fan Meeting in Seoul ~1st Ceremony~	October 27–29, 2017	Seoul	South Korea	Lotte Hotels & Resorts	—N/a	
Unibirthday (Pentagon's Private Class) (Note: Some of the members did not participate. E'Dawn due to internal affairs and Yan An due to unchangeable schedule.)	August 11, 2018	Seoul	South Korea	Daeyang Hall Sejong University	—N/a	
The 1st Fan Meeting in Japan - 僕たちの第一歩 (Our First Step)	August 18, 2018	Tokyo	Japan	Stellar Ball	—N/a	
「PENTAGon MOVINGon	November 25, 2018	Tokyo	Japan	Nakano Sun Plaza	2,000	
2018 Fan Meeting in Busan Turn It Up!	December 15, 2018	Busan	South Korea	Lotte Hotels & Resorts	—N/a	
2018 Fan Meeting in Busan Turn It Up!	December 16, 2018	Busan	South Korea	Lotte Hotels & Resorts	—N/a	
2018 Fan Meeting in Busan Turn It Up!	December 17, 2018	Busan	South Korea	Lotte Hotels & Resorts	—N/a	
UNIONE (Let's Play with PENTAGON)	February 24, 2019	Seoul	South Korea	Olympic Hall	—N/a	
2nd Fan meeting in Seoul ～ Genie:us ～	June 14, 2019	Seoul	South Korea	Olympic Hall	—N/a	
2nd Fan meeting in Seoul ～ Genie:us ～	June 15, 2019	Seoul	South Korea	Olympic Hall	—N/a	
2nd Fan meeting in Seoul ～ Genie:us ～	June 16, 2019	Seoul	South Korea	Olympic Hall	—N/a	
PENTAGON 2nd Fan Meeting in Japan 〜 Our HAPPINESS！〜	August 23, 2019	Osaka	Japan	Zepp Osaka Bayside	(Note: The article mentions that ticket on both days was sold out but it only mentioned the attendance on August 25, 2019.)	
PENTAGON 2nd Fan Meeting in Japan 〜 Our HAPPINESS！〜	August 25, 2019	Tokyo	Japan	Zepp Tokyo	2,500	
I love you today, I want to cherish, Universe! (Note: This event was aired through YouTube Live.)	March 8, 2020	Seoul	South Korea	—N/a	—N/a	
Pentag-on Air	September 6, 2020	Seoul	South Korea	–	—N/a	

== Showcases ==
City	Date	Country	Venue	Showcase	Attendance	Ref.
Pentagon 1st Mini Album Pentagon	December 16, 2016	Seoul	South Korea	Yes24 Live Hall	—N/a	
The Museum of PENTAGON Showcase	October 16, 2016	Seoul	South Korea	Some Sevit	—N/a	
1st Showcase in Tokyo, Japan	December 10, 2016	Tokyo	Japan	Toyosu Pit	3,000	
1st Showcase in Bangkok, Thailand	April 1, 2017	Bangkok	Thailand	CentralPlaza Chaengwattana	—N/a	
1st Showcase in Taipei, Taiwan	April 8, 2017	Taipei	Taiwan	ATT Show Box	—N/a	
1st Showcase in Singapore	June 3, 2017	Singapore		Kallang Theatre	—N/a	
Pentagon 2nd Mini Album Ceremony	June 10–12, 2017	Seoul	South Korea	Shinhan Card Fan Live Hall	—N/a	
Pentagon 3rd Mini Album Demo_01	September 6, 2017	Seoul	South Korea	Yes24 Live Hall	—N/a	
Pentagon 4th Mini Album Demo_02	November 23, 2017	Seoul	South Korea	Blue Square I-Market Hall	—N/a	
1st Japanese Mini Album Violet	January 6–17, 2018	Nagoya, Chiba, Tokyo	Japan	Zepp Nagoya, VenusFort	—N/a	
Pentagon 5th Mini Album Positive	April 1, 2018	Seoul	Korea	Blue Square I-Market Hall	—N/a	
2nd Japanese Mini Album Shine	August 28, 2018	Osaka	Japan	Matsushita IMP Hall	—N/a	
Pentagon 8th Mini Album Genie:us	March 27, 2019	Seoul	South Korea	–	—N/a	
Pentagon 9th Mini Album Sum(me:r)	July 17, 2019	Seoul	South Korea	Blue Square I-Market Hall	—N/a	
Pentagon Studio Album Universe: The Black Hall	February 12, 2020	Seoul	South Korea	Yes24 Live Hall	—N/a	
Pentagon 10th Mini Album We:th media online showcase	October 12, 2020	Seoul	South Korea	Blue Square I-Market Hall	—N/a	
Pentagon 11th Mini Album Love or Take media online showcase	March 15, 2021	Seoul	South Korea	–	—N/a	

== Joint tours and concerts, music festivals and television performances ==
Title	Date	City	Country	Venue	Performed song(s)	Ref.
Seowon Valley Green Concert	May 28, 2016	Gyeonggi-do	South Korea	Seowon Valley	"Fun" (Pitbull)	
KFM Gyeonggi Broadcast Radio Show KPop Concert	October 14, 2016	Suwon	South Korea	Suwon Hwaseong Palace Square	"Gorilla"	
M Countdown Special In Jeju	October 27, 2016	Jeju	South Korea		"Candy" (H.O.T.); "Gorilla"	
Super Seoul Dream Concert	November 27, 2016	Seoul	South Korea	Gocheok Sky Dome	"Gorilla"	
TV5 Game Tayo sa 2017 New Year Countdown	December 31, 2016	Quezon City	Philippines	Quezon Memorial Circle	"Gorilla"; "Pentagon"; "You Are"; "Can You Feel It"	
2017 KCON Japan	May 21, 2017	Chiba	Japan	Makuhari Messe	"Can You Feel It"; "Rising Sun" (TVXQ)	
idol CON	May 27, 2017	Seoul	South Korea	COEX D Hall and Auditorium	"Wake Up; "Pentagon"; "Gorilla"; "Can You Feel It"; "Pretty Pretty"	
Super Pop Con 2017	July 7, 2017	Bay City	Philippines	Mall of Asia Arena	"Can You Feel It"; "Pretty Pretty"; "Beautiful"; "Critical Beauty"	
2017 KCON Australia	September 22, 2017	Sydney	Australia	Sydney Super Dome	"Like This"; "Gorilla"; "Can You Feel It"; "Hard Carry" (Got7)	
Japan-Korea GFSC Charity Campaign 10th Anniversary KMF2017	September 24, 2017	Yokohama	Japan	Yokohama Arena	"Gorilla"; "Can You Feel It"; "Critical Beauty"; "Pretty Pretty"; "Spectacular"; "Like This"; "Beautiful"	
MU:CON 2017	September 27, 2017	Seoul	South Korea	MBC Open Hall	"Can You Feel It"; "Like This""Critical Beauty"	
Fandom School 2017 Korea Music Festival	September 30, 2017	Seoul	South Korea	Gocheok Sky Dome	"Like This"	
10th Anniversary KMF2017 in Sapporo	November 4, 2017	Yokohama	Japan	Yokohama Arena	"Gorilla" (Japanese ver.); "Can You Feel It" (Japanese ver.); "Pretty Pretty" (Japanese ver.); "Like This"; "Beautiful" (Japanese ver.); "Spectacular"	
Cheer Up For You Concert	December 9, 2017	Anyang	South Korea	Anyang Gymnasium	"Like This"; "Runaway"; "Critical Beauty"; "Gorilla"	
Pyeongchang Winter Olympics G-10 2018	January 30, 2018	Seoul	South Korea	KBS Arena Hall	"Runaway"	
10th K-Pop Festival 2018	February 10, 2018	Sapporo	Japan	Nitori Culture Hall	"Can You Feel It" (Japanese ver.); "Like This"; "Runway"; "UP UP UP"; "Gorilla" (Japanese ver.)	
Sapporo Snow Festival J:COM Plaza Live	February 12, 2018	Sapporo	Japan	J:COM Plaza	"Can You Feel It"; "Runaway"; "Violet" (Japanese ver.); "Gorilla" (Japanese ver.)	
K-POP World Festa	February 24, 2018	Gangneung	South Korea	Gangneung Olympic Park	"Violet"; "Runaway"	
2018 KCON Japan	April 13, 2018	Chiba	Japan	Makuhari Messe	"Shine"; "Dream" (Suzy and Baekhyun) with Seola	
Seowon Valley Charity Green Concert	May 26, 2018	Gyeonggi-do	South Korea	Seowon Valley	"Violet"; "Shine"	
United Cube Concert – One	June 16, 2018	Seoul	South Korea	Korea International Exhibition Center	"Like This"; "Gorilla"; "Can You Feel It"; "Spectacular"; "Shine" (with Jo Kwon)	
2018 KCON NY	June 23, 2018	New Jersey	United States	Prudential Center	"Rock" (Stray Kids); "Wake Up"; "Shine"; "Gorilla"; "Pretty Pretty"	
M Countdown in Taipei	July 5, 2018	Taipei	Taiwan	Taipei Arena	"Shine"; "Wild Eyes" (Shinhwa)	
K-STAR Concert	July 28, 2018	Seoul	South Korea	Korea University Tiger Dome	"Runaway"; "Pretty Pertty"; "Like This"; "Violet"; "Beautiful"; "Shine"	
2018 KCON LA	August 12, 2018	Los Angeles	United States	Staples Center	"Shine" (Remix version); "Beautiful"; "Runaway"	
Incheon K-pop Concert 2018	September 1, 2018	Incheon	South Korea	Incheon Munhak Stadium	"Shine"	
Korean Music Wave Festival 2018 (DMC)	September 8, 2018	Seoul	South Korea	Digital Media City	"Shine"	
2018 KCON Thailand	September 30, 2018	Bangkok	Thailand	IMPACT Arena, Exhibition and Convention Center	"Naughty Boy"; "Pretty Pretty"; "Shine"	
The Hong Kong Youth Concert	October 2, 2018	Kowloon	Hong Kong	Hong Kong Coliseum	"Naughty Boy"; "Pretty Pretty"; "Shine"	
Rainbow Festival	October 18, 2018	Seoul	South Korea	Seoul Children Hospital's Samsung Development Center	"Naughty Boy"; "Beautiful"; "Don't Worry, Dear" (Lee Juck)	
Korean Music Performers' Festival (KMPF)	October 26, 2018	Seoul	South Korea	Olympic Hall	"Naughty Boy"; "Violet"; "Shine"	
2018 Fantasia Super Concert in Bucheon	November 3, 2018	Bucheon	South Korea	Bucheon Stadium	"Naughty Boy"; "Runaway"; "Violet"; "Shine"	
2018 Jeju Hallyu Festival	November 4, 2018	Jeju City	South Korea	Jeju Stadium	"Naughty Boy"	
2018 60th Anniversary Thailand-Korea Relations HEC Korea Concert	November 17, 2018	Bangkok	Thailand	Thammasat Stadium	"Gorilla"; "Runaway"; "Pretty Pretty"; "Naughty Boy"; "Shine"	
KBS Youth Cheer Concert	December 11, 2018		South Korea		"Naughty Boy"; "Critical Beauty"; "Shine"	
U & Cube Festival 2019 in Japan	March 23, 2019	Tokyo	Japan	Musashino Forest Sport Plaza	"Gorilla" (Japanese ver.); "Cosmo"; "Naughty Boy"; "Shine" (Japanese ver.)	
Immortal Songs Special Concert in Japan	April 4, 2019	Chiba	Japan	Makuhari Messe	"Nation of Morning" (Kim Yeon Ja)	
Korea Assistive Technology Device Fair	April 22, 2019	Seoul	South Korea	aT Center	"Naughty Boy"; "Pretty Pretty"; "Shine"; "Sha La La"	
2019 KCON Japan	May 19, 2019	Chiba	Japan	Makuhari Messe	"Beautiful" (Crush); "Sha La La"	
2019 HallyuPopFest	May 26, 2019	Kallang	Singapore	Singapore Indoor Stadium	"Sha La La"; "Runaway"; "Violet"; "Critical Beauty"; "Naughty Boy"; "Shine"	
Japan Collection Showcase	June 7, 2019	Osaka	Japan	Zepp Namba	"Sha La La"; "Gorilla"; "Shine"	
DMZ POP Concert	June 8, 2019	Gangwondo	South Korea	Inje stadium	"Sha La La"; "Spring Snow"; "Naugty Boy"; "Shine"	
Star of Asia	June 16, 2019	Almaty	Kazakhstan	Medeu High-Rink	"Sha La La"; "Pretty Pretty"; "Can You Feel It"; "Naugty Boy"; "Spring Snow"; "Shine"	
Music Core's Ulsan Summer Festival's K-Pop Festival	July 22, 2019	Ulsan	South Korea	Ulsan Sports Complex	"Humph"; "Shine"	
22nd Boryeong Mud Festival K-Pop Super Concert	July 27, 2019	Boryeong	South Korea	Daecheon Beach	"Humph"; "Shine"	
Coca-Cola SUMMER STATION Music LIVE (Note: TV Asahi / Roppongi Hills Summer Festival SUMMER STATION 2019)	August 16, 2019	Tokyo	Japan	Roppongi Hills Arena	"Cosmo"; "Happiness" (Japanese ver.); "Sha La La" (Japanese ver.); "Shine" (Japanese ver.)	
Rakuten GirlsAward 2019 AUTUMN/WINTER	September 28, 2019	Chiba	Japan	Makuhari Messe	"Happiness" (Japanese ver.); "Sha La La" (Japanese ver.); "Shine" (Japanese ver.)	
SBS Super Concert in Daegu	March 8, 2020	Daegu	South Korea			
KCON:TACT 2020 Summer	June 21, 2020	Seoul	South Korea	Mnet studio	"Basquiat"; "Spring Snow"; "Shine"	
2020 Golden Wave Concert	August 4, 2020	Gyeonggi-do	South Korea	Bitmaru Broadcasting Support Centre	"Naughty Boy"; "Humph!"; "Shine"; "Spring Snow"; "Camellia"	
KBS Open Concert	October 18, 2020	Seoul	South Korea	KBS Hall	"Daisy"	
Kang Han-na's Volume Up - Lake Music Festival	October 18, 2020	Seoul	South Korea		"Shine"; "Daisy"	
KakaoTV Comeback Show Mu:Talk Live	October 19, 2020	Seoul	South Korea		"Shine"; "Daisy"	
Korea Music Drive-In Festival (KMDF 2020) (Note: The event was held with a minimal number of people due to the ongoing COVID-19.)	October 31, 2020	Seoul	South Korea	Incheon Port International Passenger Terminal	"Daisy"; "Shine"	
Show! Music Core 700th Anniversary Special Stage	November 7, 2020	Seoul	South Korea	MBC Dream Center	"My House" (2PM); "Daisy"	
KITE: K-Pop in the Emirates	November 13, 2020	–	South Korea	Korean Cultural Center	"Daisy"; "Shine"	
2020 Korean Culture Festival in Jeonju - K-ORIGIN CITY	November 15, 2020	–	South Korea	–	"Daisy"	
K-Community Festival	November 22, 2020	–	South Korea	–	"Daisy"; Samul nori performance; "Shine"; "Spring Snow"	
2020 Asia Artist Awards	November 25, 2020	Seoul	South Korea	–	"Daisy"	
Red Angel K-pop Overcome Corona! World Cheer Season 2 'Spring Day'	March 20, 2021	Seoul	South Korea	Yes24 live Hall	"Spring Snow"; "Baby I Love You"; "Do or Not"	
2021 Busan One Asia Festival (BOF) concert	May 8, 2021	–	South Korea	–	"Do or Not"; "Shine"; "Spring Snow"	
KCON:TACT 4 U	June 19, 2021	–	South Korea	Mnet studio	"Beautiful Goodbye"; "Baby I Love You"; "Do or Not"	
BREAK OUT	June 23, 2021	–	South Korea	–	"Do or Not" (Japanese version)	
MIK Festival	July 30, 2022	London	United Kingdom	Southwark Park	"The Game"; "Feelin' Like"; "Baby I Love You"; "Call My Name"; "Beautiful Goodbye"; "Sparkling Night"; "Shine"	
KCON Saudi Arabia 2022	September 30, 2022	Riyadh	Saudi Arabia	Boulevard City		

== Guerilla concerts, special events and mini lives ==
Date	Location	Country	Venue	Events	Attendance	Ref.
July 9, 2016	Sincheon-dong, Seoul	South Korea		Pentagon Sincheon Guerilla Concert (Note: Predebut)	—N/a	
July 9, 2016	Hongdae, Seoul	South Korea		Pentagon Hongdae Guerilla Concert	—N/a	
March 24, 2017	Tokyo	Japan	Shinagawa Stellar Ball	Mini Live & Talk	5,000	
May 13, 2018	Seoul	South Korea	Cheongdam-dong Pentarium	For U (For Universe) (Note: Pentagon 6th mini album Positive special event.)	—N/a	
August 28	Osaka	Japan	Matsushita IMP Hall	Special mini live (2 shows)	—N/a	
October 14, 2018	Seoul	South Korea		For U (For Universe) (Note: Pentagon 7th mini album Thumbs Up! special event.) (Note: Pentagon 9th mini album Sum(me:r) special event.)	—N/a	
August 11, 2019	Seoul	South Korea	20 Space Cube Cafe	For U (For Universe)	—N/a	
August 21, 2019	Shibuya	Japan	Shibuya 109	Guerilla concert (Note: This event was canceled about 4 minutes after the event started because the area near the venue panicked.)	500	
