= We L:ve =

2020 online live concert of Pentagon

- Online concert by Pentagon
- Associated album: WE:TH
- Dates: 29 November 2020 (originally scheduled); 13 December 2020 (rescheduled date)
- Duration: 120 minutes.
- Website: Official website

Pentagon concert chronology
- PRISM (2019); WE L:VE (2020)

We L:ve, also known as the 2020 Pentagon Online Concert WE LIVE, is the first online live concert by South Korean boy group Pentagon. Initially, the live concert is set to be broadcast live at 3 pm KST on November 29, 2020. However, a day before the event, Cube announced that the concert would be "urgently postponed", amid the COVID-19 pandemic. A rescheduled date for the concert was held on December 13.

This concert is a solo concert held by Pentagon after one year of their first world tour Prism. The members expressed their ambition, "We will present an unforgettable time to the global universe with a special stage that can only be found in this performance".

== Background ==
On September 29, 2020, Cube released a time table for Pentagon's tenth extended play WE:TH through their official homepage and SNS, which shows the group's promotion schedule beginning October 4 until their first online concert, 2020 Pentagon Online Concert [WE L:VE]. On October 20, they released the official concert poster. In the released poster, Pentagon showed a warm atmosphere while leaning against each other against the backdrop of the Milky Way in the night sky where daisy petals flutter. The keyword 'L:VE' can be interpreted in various meanings and is expecting to show a variety of appearances to their fans. The tickets can be purchased through Interpark from November 26. We L:ve's official merchandise was available; pre-sale from November 11–16 and general sale began on November 17. A series of behind-the-scene pictures, special clips and videos were posted everyday on the group's official social media accounts.

On November 28, Pentagon announced through their social media accounts that their online concert 'WE L:VE' was postponed as Yeo One and Pentagon self-quarantined. Yeo One underwent voluntary COVID-19 testing because he was in the same location with someone who tested positive. His result was confirmed negative. Cube stated, "To prevent any unexpected circumstances, the rest of Pentagon members decided to get tested for COVID-19 and self-quarantine themselves.", and further apologized to those who have been waiting for the concert.

On December 3, Pentagon announced the rescheduled date for '2020 Pentagon Online Concert [WE L:VE]' slated for December 13 at 3 pm KST.

== Concert synopsis ==
Before the show started, a countdown timer, ticket purchase verification and concert information appeared on the homepage. Pentagon showed a colourful appearance under the four chapters under the keyword 'L:VE', which can be interpreted in various ways. After the end of the countdown, Pentagon opened the stage with intense stages such as "Basquiat", "Gorilla" and "Can You Feel It". After the songs, Pentagon took a breather to interact with their fans as they introduced themselves and greeted fans in various languages such as Japanese, Hindi, French, and German and more. The member apologized saying, "We should have had a concert two weeks ago, but I'm sorry to see you only now. It's a more confusing time than ever. I am really grateful for being able to meet you on the stage like this." Next was, "The Black Hall", a song that had been much requested by their fans for the group to perform. In Chapter II - We L:ve with Color, the group performed unit stages according to the member's personality, starting with a supercool performance by Hui and Shinwon. The duo performed their unreleased self-composed song "WTH", which was unveiled for the first time. The second unit performance was performed by Yuto and Wooseok. They presented a fun hip-hop stage wherein they performed the tracks, "Poison (독)", "Always Difficult Always Beautiful", and "Repeat:II (도돌이표)". Yanan and Hongseok presented a warm winter sensibility with Ailee's "I Will Go to You Like the First Snow". Lastly, Yeo One and Kino showcased a rendition of Taemin's "Move". On this day, Jinho, a member who enlisted in the military in May, watched the performance online and communicated in real time through comments, giving a different fun and impression. Jinho showed off his strong friendship by sending passionate support to each stage of the Pentagon. Fans also responded with comments, and held comment events such as 'I love Pentagon' and 'We are always with Pentagon'. Next, Pentagon start with a classroom skit during Chapter III - We L:ve Young, where Pentagon members introduced themselves, including member Jinho to their teacher Yeo One and their new classmate Kino. They continued to present stages with their hit songs from "Happiness" (Korean version), "Shine", "Naughty Boy" and "Spring Snow". During Chapter IV - We L:ve on Stage, the group expressed the meaning of 'stage' means to them. Hui expressed that the stage is not just his workplace but also his battlefield where he feels most pressured and where he has the most hardships and where it brings him the greatest pain. The stage is also a place that brings me the greatest happiness, as well as the greatest joy and achievements. It is a space where contradicting emotions exist". In this section, Pentagon performed never-before-seen "Paradise (별이 빛나는 이 밤)" and "You Like" as well as "Sha La La" and "Daisy". Before the final chapter We L:ve in Universe, a special video "To Universe" with words from Pentagon for their fans was displayed. Next was "Nostalgia" as an encore song where they showed the unibong choreography made by member Kino. During this stage, they were surprised by the fans from across the globe joined and sang along with them. Concluding the show, Pentagon gave fans a precious gift in the form of a track made by member Kino titled "Eternal Flame".

== Set lists ==
This set list is representative of the show on December 13, 2020.

Chapter I - We L:ve at This Moment & VCR

1. "Basquiat"
2. "Gorilla"
3. "Can You Feel It"
4. "The Black Hall"

Chapter II - We L:ve with Colors & VCR

4. "WTH" (Note: What The Heck) (Note: Unreleased song) (Hui and Shinwon unit)
5. "Poison (독)" + "Always Difficult Always Beautiful" + "Repeat:II" (Yuto and Wooseok unit)
6. "I Will Go to You Like the First Snow" (Note: Original song by Ailee) (Hongseok and Yan An unit)
7. "Move" (Note: Original song by Taemin) (Yeo One and Kino unit)

Chapter III - We L:ve Young

8. "Happiness" (Korean version)
9. "Shine"
10. "Naughty Boy"
11. "Spring Snow"

Chapter IV - We L:ve on Stage & VCR

12. "Paradise (별이 빛나는 이 밤)"
13. "You Like"
14. "Sha La La"
15. "Daisy"

Chapter IV - We L:ve in Universe & VCR

16. "To Universe"
17. "Nostalgia"
18. "Eternal Flame"

== Personnel ==
Credits are adapted from the concert's closing credits.

- Artists - Jinho, (Note: Jinho was credited in the closing credits and his voice was included in the unreleased song "Eternal Flame".) Hui, Hongseok, Shinwon, Yeo One, Yan An, Yuto, Kino, Wooseok
- Presented – Cube Entertainment
- Chairman – Kang Sungkon
- C.E.O – Ahn Woohyun, Rhee Dongkwan
- Vice chairman – An Byunghwan
- Artist group executive direct – Jeon Seunghwe
- Artist management director – Park Myungchul
- Management 1 director – Park Myungchul
- Management 1 division – Youn Daesung, Cho Sungyoon, Shin Hongjun, So Byeongjun, Choi Yukyung, Kim Jinsu
- Management 2 director – Hwang Byeongil
- Management 2 division – Jung Kwanghee, Cho Seongbeon, Yun Keunsoo, Ahn Younghwan, Lee Giseong
- Management 3 director – Nam Yujung
- Management 3 division – Hwang Kanghoon, Jeong Cheolho, Lee Juyeong, Jo Hanseok, Kim Dohyun
- Management 4 director – Ku Byungmoo
- Management 4 division – Kim Chungyoung, Jung Byoungjoo, Kim Kihwan, Park Sein
- Marketing director – Shinny's Borami
- Marketing team 1 – Sohn Hyunseo, Hong Sujeong, Kim Seulgi, Kwon Huijeong
- Marketing team 2 – Shin Seulki, Lee Hyeyeon, Kim Jaeyi, Seo Hyelim
- Japan business team – Sung Jiyoung
- Media relations chief manager – Heo Jaeok
- Media relations chief team – Kim Jaehyun, Kim Hyehyun, Park Jisoo
- Artist performance production chief manager – Kim Sehwan
- Artist development chief manager – Song Jungeun
- Casting team – Oh Hyejung, Jung Rakyoung, Shin Jiye
- Training team – Logan Lee, Park Byunggwan
- Global business chief manager – Song Jungeun
- Global business team – Kim Jihyo. Lee Sunjae, Joy Yang, Ahn Sueyeon, Bak Sohui, Ling Li
- Concert/MD team – Kim Seohyun, Shin Minhee, Ahn Daehwan
- Advertising business team – Kang Seungbo, Lee Cheoljae
- Visual group executive director – Jang Jaehyeok
- Visual production team – Kim Suhan, Lee Kyeongsoon, Kang Minjun
- Content production team – Park Soyeon, Lee Jesus, Jang Minus, Kim Minsoo, Yun Donhee, Kim Bongfeel, Lee Chaewon, Kim Yeojin, Moon Youra, Kim Eungchan, Kim Donghung
- Art & web team – Je Juyeong, Ko Eunhee, Park Soomin, Lee Haena, Kang Heekyung, In Hyejin
- Artist directing chief manager – Jang Yeonhwa
- Artist directing team – Park Jihyen, Jang Hojung
- Music production chief manager – Monica Jihyun Kim
- A&R team – Sim Soyeon, Park Sukhyung, Kim DOyee, Oh Yunji
- Music production team – Shin Jaebin, Seo Jaewoo, Won Jeongho, Seo Junsik, Choi Yeji
- Music publishing team – Kim Minjung, Seo Subin
- Corporate communications director – Ahn Myungkyu, Kim Eunjung
- Corporate communications – Oh Seolhwa
- Business management group executive director – Jo Changhee
- Business management director – You Jisu
- Financial accounting team – Kim Kahee, Yun Kyungseo, Lee Hyeonju
- Personnel general affairs team – Lee Yongjin, Kim Giback, Yoo Younggon
- Management strategy director – Yoo Sungman
- Disclosure/investor – Kim Hyojin, Dana Park
- Legal team – Cho Onsun, Shin Jin
- VT Cube Japan Inc.
  - Executive supervor – Lee Jungsook
  - Management – Ayano Tanaka, Hwang Doohwan, Akiyo Kaneko, Mami Usami
- Choreography director – Kim Sehwan
- Choreography – Kim Myoungsup, Kim Minseong, Kim Jiyong, Kim Hyosep, Kim Hyunjin, Noh Hana, Park Ohksun, Bang Minjoo, Lee Dongha, Han Jiwon @StarSystem
- Styling – Park Yonghyun, Yu Hyeyoung, Kim Kwangsoo @NakedRoom
- Hair – Kim Taesung, Sophia @JennyHouse
- Make up – Hanna, Yeoun Hee, Yuyuji @JennyHouse
- Photographer – @Studi5 (Lee Soojin, Seo Sehyun), @GM Pictures (Lee Sanghyuk, Heo Yeseul, Park Mimsu)
- Design – Yoo Soojin, Park Deokyeong, Hwang Jihee @Studio Th!nkers
- Concert production
  - Stage manager – Choi Soyoung, Yoo Eunjeong, Kim Kyuseob @RWD Stage management
  - Stage set – @Good Stage
  - Truss system – Lee Youngchan, Ji Eunseok, Le Yongzhe, Lee Youngjae, Song Qilong, Du Huaqian, Lee Juho, Lee Gyunhwan, Lee Yonghoon, Li Junzhe, Choi Hyeonseok, Hong Wonpyo, Oh Hyemi, Lee Jinseong, Seo Younji, Lee Youngchan @ Frame Company
- Sound
  - Pro Tools – Shin Jaebin @Cube Entertainment
  - Sound – Yoon Chungyeon, Park Hyeonmin, Kim Donghee, Oh Seungtaek, Seo Sungwon, Jung Eunjoo @Artmix.co
- Lighting
  - Lighting director – Moon Jihwan, Lee Yukyeong @Moonlight
- Video & LED
  - Video design & director – Jeon Myoungkeon, Lee Sunghwan, Kim Jeonghun, Hwang Sinae, Gwak Sangyeon, Lee Gilho, Mila Cho, Choi Yoonsoo, Eugene Jeong, Park Hyeji, Kim Yeonjeong @Motion E&T
- Organized – Live Nation, CJ ENM
- Ticket – Interpark
- Chief production manager – Ian Chung
- Stage designer – Lee Eunchae
- Writer – Choi Hyejeong
- Assistant director – Jeong Yuna
- Show director – Kim Jangta
- Special thanks – Universe
