= We:th =

- Digital cover featuring artwork by Kino of Pentagon

EP by Pentagon
- Released: October 12, 2020
- Genre: K-pop; pop rock; dance
- Length: 20:06
- Language: Korean
- Label: Cube
- Producer: Hui; Nathan; Wooseok; yunji; Kino; Hoho; MosPick; Minit; Jinho; Jun.p

Pentagon chronology
Universe: The History (2020)	We:th (2020)	Love or Take (2021)

Pentagon EP chronology
Sum(me:r) (2019)	We:th (2020)	Love or Take (2021)

Alternative cover
- Seen version

- Unseen version

Singles from We:th
- 1. "Daisy" Released: October 12, 2020

We:th (stylized as WE:TH) is the tenth extended play by South Korean boy group Pentagon. The EP was released digitally and physically on October 12, 2020, by Cube Entertainment, eight months after their first studio album Universe: The Black Hall released in February. The album is the group's first release without member Jinho, who was completing his mandatory military service. After a 440-day hiatus due to health reason, member Yan An participated in the album. The physical version is available in two versions: "Seen" and "Unseen".

The group continues its reputation as a self-made idol group by participating in the lyrics and composition of all six tracks. The lead single "Daisy" was composed by members Hui and Wooseok with Nathan. Only through physical album, the EP features Jinho's self-composed solo song "I'm Here".

Commercially, the album recorded 64,045 copies of one-week sales, making Pentagon's best selling work since debut. It debuted and charted at number 4 on the Gaon Album Chart, giving them their fourth top 4 hit. Later, the album surpassed 110,000 copies sold and becomes their first album to break the wall of 100,000 copies.

== Name ==
Regarding the album name, We:th is a compound word of 'WE' which means 'we' and 'WITH' which means 'together' – "It means the sympathy between Pentagon and Universe (fan name) coexisting for each other. It is an album that contains all the moments and emotions we they feel while living together are captured in a total of 6 tracks under the keyword 'empathy'."

== Background and promotions ==
On September 17, 2020, it was reported that Pentagon had confirmed their comeback for October and were in the final stages of preparing for the album. The following day, Cube released a spoiler video of member Yan An, who had ceased activities since July 2019, officially announcing his return and participation in the comeback. In the video, Yan An smiles at the camera while looking at a monitor with a blinking cursor in a studio full of lights. The video ends with the phrase "I've been keeping an eye on you" appearing. On September 22, a monotone interview film about their four-year journey titled 'Re: Pentagon' was released. On September 25, Pentagon released a comeback trailer video called 'Keep us by your side'. Later that month, Cube officially announced their comeback with the release of an artwork teaser image through their social media accounts. The teaser contains a flower drawn with black lines, along with the album name and release date. On September 29, 2020, Cube released a time table for Pentagon's tenth extended play through their official homepage and SNS, which shows the group's promotion schedule beginning October 4 until their first online concert, 2020 Pentagon Online Concert WE L:VE on November 29. On October 6 and 7, Pentagon released their first and second concept images, respectively.

On the afternoon before the song's digital release, the group held a media showcase for the release of the EP at the Blue Square iMarket Hall in Seoul, hosted by MC Haru. To promote the album, Cube and VT Cosmetics held a 'Daisy' cupholder event on October 17–18 at CUBAKER, Seongdong-gu in Seoul.

Pentagon released Pentagon-10th Mini Album [We:th] Flower Live in Jarasum on October 24. The video includes a total of three live clips, including the acoustic version of "Daisy", "Beautiful Goodbye'" and "Nostalgia". The video was filmed at Jara Island in Gapyeong, Gyeonggi-do.

== Artwork and packaging ==
Pentagon released two album versions for We:th. In Seen version, Pentagon shows 8 different charms and colors under a pastel-toned background, with flowers as props used to create a pure and romantic mood. In Unseen version, the members shows a deeper sensibility under the vivid colored background.

Kino shared that he drew the online album art cover for We:th. He wanted to gift Hui, the leader of the group, something special for his hard work on making "Daisy". He was hesitant to draw it at first as the album cover but the members persuaded him and this marks his 'debut drawing'.

== Track listing ==
We:th track listing
No.	Title	Lyrics	Music	Arrangement	Length
1.	"Daisy" (데이지)	Hui; Wooseok	Hui; 네이슨 (Nathan); Wooseok	네이슨 (Nathan); yunji	3:09
2.	"Beautiful Goodbye"	Kino; Wooseok	Kino; 네이슨 (Nathan); Hoho	네이슨 (Nathan); Hoho	3:22
3.	"Nostalgia" (Korean: 그해 그달 그날; RR: Geuhae Geudal Geunal; lit. That Year, That Month, That Day)	Wooseok	MosPick; Wooseok	MosPick	3:04
4.	"You Like"	Hui; Wooseok	Hui; Minit; Wooseok	Minit	3:15
5.	"Paradise (This Night Where Stars Shine)" (Paradise (별이 빛나는 이 밤))	Kino; Wooseok	Kino; MosPick	MosPick	3:35
Total length:					16:25

CD-only track
No.	Title	Lyrics	Music	Arrangement	Length
6.	"I’m Here" (Jinho solo)	Jinho	Jinho	네이슨 (Nathan); Jun.p	3:41
Total length:					20:06

== Songs ==
"Daisy" is an alternative rock song that was sung with a sad and sad heart that everyone would have experienced after the breakup. The lyrics are expressed by the use of daisy flowers. The white flower as the sign of hope as a metaphor for love and progress focusing on the ambiguous meaning that describes how one will eventually get burned by that love. Pentagon member explained, "After the breakup, I portrayed the feelings wishing that the other person would be happy while wishing they could miss you because they could not meet someone better than me." The track features heartbreaking and realistic sentiments in a straightforward lyrics.

"Beautiful Goodbye" is a track with the lingering emotions knowing that the love already ended but wishes to take only the good memories of it. The group explained, "I want to leave only good memories. I poured my broken heart into the lyrics. The emotions rises as the track go to the second half, convening the feeling of the person who wants a beautiful breakup."

Based on composer and Pentagon member, Wooseok, he described "Nostalgia" as "a song like a picture of memories that you suddenly take out of an old drawer. People live with many memories and memories of each. And I suddenly remember the happy times and miss them."

"You Like" is an intense hip-hop dance song that converted from intro starting with a piano and change as it continues leading to can intense verse. With this song, Pentagon challenged themselves with combination of two song compositions. The song also features low voice and addictive melody that asking listeners 'What would you like'.

"Paradise" is described as an electronic dance song for listeners who feel nostalgic to the K-pop sensibility of the late 2000s but added with newly digested style by Pentagon. Pentagon member, Kino composed this song with the thought of "this kind of song is rarely here now, so I thought of making a Pentagon's 2000s style." The lyrical lyrics of the song created by two lovers' intense beats along with a melody that is easy to sing along.

"I'm Here" (Jinho solo) is a small gift prepared by Jinho who will always be there for his friends and bandmates who are running toward their dreams. Jinho explained, "When people are faced by exhaustion and discouragement, they bring back the old self of the day when they first dreamt of a dream. I hope that the voice of Pentagon's Jinho with the words 'You are doing great, so don't worry', will comfort everyone who listens to this song." The song was made before he enlisted.

== Commercial performance ==
We:th topped iTunes Top Albums chart in 9 countries including Brazil, Saudi Arabia, Argentina, Estonia, Ecuador, Cambodia, Colombia, Peru, and Portugal. The album also ranked second on the iTunes Worldwide Album Chart, becoming their highest record on that platform. According to Billboard chart released on October 13, Pentagon re-entered at number 33 on the Billboard Social 50 chart due to the announcement of their comeback, variety of teasing contents related to the new release, starting with interview films, track list, concept image, audio teaser, music video teaser etc., gaining hot interest from global fans.

According to Hanteo, We:th which was released on the October 12, recorded an initial sales of 64,045 copies. The amount of sales increase twice from the initial sales of their first studio album Universe: The Black Hall released in February, 2020.

On the chart issue dated October 11–17, 2020, the album debuted and charted at number 4 on the Gaon Album Chart and Gaon Retail Album with 49,134 units. The group also re-enters at number 14 on Gaon Social Chart 2.0 since Week 50 of 2019.

== Accolades ==
Awards
Year	Organization	Category	Result	Ref.
2020	Seoul Music Awards	Main Award	Nominated	
2020	Seoul Music Awards	Popular Award	Nominated	
2020	Seoul Music Awards	K-Wave Popular Award	Nominated	

== Charts ==
Weekly sales chart performance for WE:TH
Chart (2020)	Peak position
Japanese Albums (Oricon)	16
Japan Hot Albums (Billboard Japan)	82
South Korean Albums (Gaon)	4

Sales chart performance for singles from WE:TH
Song	Chart (2020)	Peak position
"Daisy"	South Korea (Gaon)	111
"Daisy"	South Korea (Gaon Download)	4

== Certifications and sales ==
Region	Certification	Certified units/sales
Japan	—	8,489
South Korea	—	110,479

== Release history ==
Release formats for WE:TH
Region	Date	Format	Distributor	Ref.
South Korea	October 12, 2020	Digital download, streaming	Cube; Kakao M	
Various	October 12, 2020	Digital download, streaming	Cube; U-Cube	
