= Prism World Tour =

2019 concert tour by Pentagon

Pentagon World Tour "Prism"
- World tour by Pentagon
- Associated album: Pentagon; Five Senses; Ceremony; Demo_01; Demo_02; Positive; Thumbs Up! Genie:us; Sum(me:r)
- Start date: April 27, 2019
- End date: December 21, 2019
- Legs: 6
- No. of shows: 7 in Asia; 7 in North America; 4 in Latin America; 5 in Europe; 23 Total

Pentagon concert chronology
- Dear Cosmo Tour (2019); Pentagon World Tour "Prism" (2019)

Prism World Tour, also known as 2019 Pentagon World Tour 〈Prism〉 was the first concert tour headlined by South Korean boy band Pentagon. The world tour commenced with two shows in Seoul in April 2019 and continued onto Indonesia, North America, Brazil, Mexico, Taiwan, Hong Kong, Singapore and more. On July 5, Pentagon announced additional tour dates for eight cities which covers twenty-three cities worldwide. It began on April 27, 2019 in South Korea and concluded on December 21, 2019 in Japan.

== Background ==
On July 22, Cube Entertainment shares official announcement that Yan An will not be able to participate in 2019 Pentagon world tour "Prism" due to medical reason.

It has been revealed that on the way back from Jakarta after concluding their concert, the plane which Pentagon had boarded experienced a plane fault and was forced to return to Jakarta. Cube Entertainment responded, "The members are safe without any injuries. They were scheduled to move on for a schedule in Canada but experienced an incident with the plane. Currently, we are looking into other flights as to avoid disruptions to the schedule". It was reported the flight was delayed due to a problem with the air conditioning system, and they did not take off for approximately an hour. There is also said to have been a medical emergency on the flight, leading to the decision to return to Jakarta.

== Set list ==
Set list in Seoul

VCR 1

1. "Sha La La" (신토불이)
2. "Gorilla"
3. "Violet"
4. "Like This" (Acoustic version)
5. "Runaway"
6. "Just Do It Yo!" (저두요!!)
7. "Alien" (에일리언)

VCR 2

8. "Young"
9. "Round 1"
10. "Critical Beauty" (예뻐죽겠네)
11. "Skateboard"
12. "Can You Feel It" (감이 오지)
13. "When It Rains At Night" (밤에 비가 내리면)
14. "Beautiful"

VCR 3

15. "Lost Paradise" (Hui, Yuto, Kino, Wooseok)
16. "Till..." (Jinho, Hongseok, Shinwon, Yeo One, Yan An) (그 순간 그때까지)
17. "Off Road"
18. "Smile"
19. "Pretty Pretty" (예쁨)
20. "Spring Snow" (봄눈)
21. "Naughty Boy" (청개구리; Green Frog)
22. "Shine" (빛나리)

Encore

23. "Thumbs Up"
24. "Spectacular"
25. "You Are"
Set list in Asia, North America and Latin America

VCR 1

1. "Sha La La" (신토불이)
2. "Gorilla"
3. "Like This" (Acoustic version)
4. "Runaway"
5. "Just Do It Yo!" (저두요!!)
6. "Humph!"

VCR 2

7. "Havana" (Camila Cabello cover) (Jinho, Hongseok, Yeo One, Kino)
8. "Uptown Funk" (Mark Ronson featuring Bruno Mars cover) (Hui, Shinwon, Yuto, Wooseok)
9. "Critical Beauty" (예뻐죽겠네)
10. "Skateboard"
11. "Can You Feel It" (감이 오지)
12. "When It Rains At Night" (밤에 비가 내리면)
13. "Beautiful"

VCR 3

14. "Lost Paradise" (Hui, Yuto, Kino, Wooseok)
15. "Till..." (Jinho, Hongseok, Shinwon, Yeo One) (그 순간 그때까지)
16. "Fantasystic"
17. "Pretty Pretty" (예쁨)
18. "Spring Snow" (봄눈)
19. "Naughty Boy" (청개구리; Green Frog)
20. "Shine" (빛나리)

Encore

21. "Thumbs Up"
22. "Spectacular"
Set list in Europe and Singapore

VCR 1

1. "Wake Up"
2. "Sha La La" (신토불이)
3. "Gorilla"
4. "Like This" (Acoustic version)
5. "Runaway"
6. "Just Do It Yo!" (저두요!!)
7. "Humph!"

VCR 2

8. "Bad Guy" (Billie Eilish cover) (Jinho, Hongseok, Yeo One, Kino)
9. "Best Song Ever" (One Direction cover) (Hui, Shinwon, Yuto, Wooseok)
10. "Critical Beauty" (예뻐죽겠네)
11. "Skateboard"
12. "Can You Feel It" (감이 오지)
13. "When It Rains At Night" (밤에 비가 내리면)
14. "Beautiful"

VCR 3

15. "Lost Paradise" (Hui, Yuto, Kino, Wooseok)
16. "Till..." (Jinho, Hongseok, Shinwon, Yeo One) (그 순간 그때까지)
17. "Fantasystic"
18. "Pretty Pretty" (예쁨)
19. "Spring Snow" (봄눈)
20. "Naughty Boy" (청개구리; Green Frog)
21. "Shine" (빛나리)

Encore

22. "Thumbs Up"
23. "Spectacular"
Set list in Japan

VCR 1

1. "Sha La La" (Japanese version)
2. "Gorilla" (Japanese version)
3. "Like This" (Acoustic version)
4. "Runaway"
5. "Just Do It Yo!" (저두요!!)
6. "Humph!"
7. "Havana" (Camila Cabello cover) (Jinho, Hongseok, Yeo One, Kino)
8. "Uptown Funk" (Mark Ronson featuring Bruno Mars cover) (Hui, Shinwon, Yuto, Wooseok)
9. "Critical Beauty" (예뻐죽겠네)
10. "Happiness" (Japanese version)
11. "Can You Feel It" (감이 오지)
12. "When It Rains At Night" (밤에 비가 내리면)
13. "Beautiful"

VCR 2

14. "Lost Paradise" (Hui, Yuto, Kino, Wooseok)
15. "Till..." (Jinho, Hongseok, Shinwon, Yeo One) (그 순간 그때까지)
16. "Fantasystic"
17. "Spring Snow" (Japanese version)
18. "Naughty Boy" (청개구리; Green Frog) (Japanese version)
19. "Shine" (빛나리) (Korean version)

Encore

22. "Up! Up! Up!"
23. "Spectacular"

== Tour dates ==
List of concerts, showing date, city, country, venue, tickets sold, number of available tickets, and reference
Date	City	Country	Venue	Attendance	Ref.
Leg 1 - Asia
April 27, 2019	Seoul	South Korea	Blue Square iMarket Hall	—N/a	
April 28, 2019	Seoul	South Korea	Blue Square iMarket Hall	—N/a	
August 31, 2019	Jakarta	Indonesia	The Kasablanka	—N/a	
Leg 2 - North America
September 3, 2019	Toronto	Canada	Phoenix Concert Theatre	—N/a	
September 5, 2019	New York	United States	Beacon Theatre	—N/a	
September 6, 2019	Chicago	United States	House of Blues	1,200	
September 8, 2019	Dallas	United States	House of Blues	—N/a	
September 10, 2019	Seattle	United States	Moore Theatre	1,500	
September 12, 2019	Los Angeles	United States	Wiltern Theatre	—N/a	
September 13, 2019	San Jose	United States	City National Civic	—N/a	
Leg 3 - Latin America
September 15, 2019	São Paulo	Brazil	Tropical Butantã	2,500/2,500	
September 17, 2019	Santiago	Chile	Teatro Coliseo	2,500/2,500	
September 20, 2019	Monterrey	Mexico	Auditorio Pabellón Monterrey	100%	
September 22, 2019	Mexico City	Mexico	Auditorio BB	100%	
Leg 4 - Asia
October 6, 2019	Taipei	Taiwan	Taipei International Convention Center	—N/a	
Leg 5 - Europe
October 17, 2019	Milan	Italy	Magazzini Generali	—N/a	
October 19, 2019	Lisbon	Portugal	LxFactory	—N/a	
October 22, 2019	Berlin	Germany	Astra Kulturhaus	—N/a	
October 25, 2019	Paris	France	Le Bataclan	—N/a	
October 27, 2019	Moscow	Russia	Izvestia Hall	—N/a	
Leg 6 - Asia
November 2, 2019	Singapore		The Star Performing Arts Centre	—N/a	
December 19, 2019	Tokyo	Japan	Pacifico Yokohama	—N/a	
December 21, 2019	Osaka	Japan	Osaka International Convention Center	—N/a	

=== Cancelled shows ===
List of cancelled concerts showing date, city, country, venue and reason for cancellation
Date	City	Country	Venue	Reason
October 12, 2019	Hong Kong		KITEC, Star Hall	Safety issues in Hong Kong

== Personnel ==
Artists

- Jinho
- Hui
- Hongseok
- Shinwon
- Yeo One
- Yuto
- Kino
- Wooseok

Tour promoters

- Cube Entertainment
- CJ ENM
- Live Nation
- CKStarEntertainment (Singapore)
- Humap Contents (Singapore, Taiwan)
- MyMusicTaste (Europe)

Ticketing partners

- Yes24 (South Korea)
- Mecimapro (Indonesia)
- Ticketmaster (North America, Latin America)
- Highway Star (Brazil)
- Apactix (Singapore)
