= Dear Cosmo Tour =

2019 concert tour by Pentagon

1st Japan Zepp tour - "Dear Cosmo"
- Japan tour by Pentagon
- Associated album: Cosmo
- Start date: 10 February 2019
- End date: 12 February 2019
- No. of shows: 4

Pentagon concert chronology
- 1st Japan Zepp tour - "Dear Cosmo" (2019); Prism World Tour (2019)

Dear Cosmo Tour also known as Pentagon 1st Japan Zepp tour - "Dear Cosmo" was the first Japanese zepp concert tour by the South Korean boy band Pentagon for the promotion of their debut in the Japanese market. They toured Osaka, Nagoya, Fukuoka, and Tokyo from January 10 to February 12, 2019.

== Set list ==
The following set list is obtained from the shows.

Zepp Tour setlist Part 1
1. "Pretty Pretty"
2. "Skateboard"

Intro

3. "Gorilla" (Japanese Ver.)
4. "Can You Feel It" (감이 오지)
5. "Shine" (Acoustic ver.)
6. "Wake Up" (悪夢)

VCR

7. "Perfect" (Ed Sheeran) (Yan An solo) ^{A} / "Lift Off" (Wooseok solo)^{B} / "Drifting Apart" (멀어져) (Hui & Shinwon duet)^{C}
8. "Navigation" (Hui solo) ^{A} / "Bohemian Rhapsody (Jinho solo) ^{B} / "Trust Me" (Yuto rap solo) ^{C}
9. "Stay" Vocal unit ^{A} / "PPAP" (Daimaou Kosaka cover) (Hui, Hongseok, Shinwon, Yuto, Kino dance) ^{B}

VCR 2

10. "And U"
11. "Cosmo"
12. "Runaway"
13. "Naughty Boy"
14. "Shine" (Japanese ver.)

Encore

15. "Thumbs Up"
16. "To Universe"
Zepp Tour setlist Part 2
1. "Pretty Pretty"
2. "Skateboard

Intro

3. "Gorilla" (Japanese Ver.)
4. "Can You Feel It" (감이 오지)
5. "Shine" (Acoustic ver.)
6. "Wake Up" (悪夢)

VCR

7. "(Hui solo) ^{A} / "Nandemonaiya" (Radwimps) (Yeo One solo) ^{B} / "Tears" (X Japan) (Jinho & Hongseok duet) ^{C}
8. "Lonely" (Kino solo) ^{A} / "Original" (잠시만 안녕) (MC the Max) (Jinho & Hongseok duet)^{B} / "Lift Off" (Wooseok solo) ^{C}
9. "Do It For Fun" (Rap unit) ^{A} / "Trust Me" (Yuto solo rap) ^{B} / "PPAP" (Daimaou Kosaka) (Hui, Hongseok, Shinwon, Yeo One, Yuto dance cover) ^{C}

VCR 2

10. "Dear Friend"
11. "Cosmo"
12. "Runaway"
13. "Naughty Boy"

Encore

14. "Thumbs Up"
15. "To Universe"
- ^{^A} indicates setlist in Osaka
- ^{^B} indicates setlist in Nagoya
- ^{^C} indicates setlist in Fukuoka

== Tour dates ==
Year	Date	City	Country	Venue	Attendance	Ref.
2019	12 January	Osaka	Japan	Zepp Namba	—N/a	
2019	14 January	Nagoya	Japan	Zepp Nagoya	—N/a	
2019	2 February	Fukuoka	Japan	Zepp Fukuoka	—N/a	
2019	10 February	Tokyo	Japan	Zepp DiverCity	2,000	

== Media ==
Television Broadcast

Air Date	Country	Network	Concert
February 19, 2019	Japan	Tokyo Broadcasting System Television	1st Japan Zepp tour - "Dear Cosmo" in Zepp Tokyo
