= Universe: The Black Hall =

- Upside Version

Studio album by Pentagon
- Released: February 12, 2020
- Recorded: 2019–2020
- Genre: K-pop
- Length: 37:06
- Language: Korean
- Label: Cube; Kakao M; U-Cube

Pentagon chronology
Sum(me:r) (2019)	Universe: The Black Hall (2020)	Universe: The History (2020)

Pentagon studio album chronology
Universe: The Black Hall (2020)	Universe: The History (2020)

Alternative cover
- Downside Version

Singles from Universe: The Black Hall
- 1. "Dr. Bebe" Released: February 12, 2020

Music video
- "Dr. 베베(Dr. BeBe)" on YouTube

Universe: The Black Hall is the first studio album and debut major Korean release by South Korean boy group Pentagon. It was released on February 12, 2020, by Cube Entertainment and distributed by Kakao M and U-Cube. The album marks their longest gap between their previous extended plays since the ninth mini album Sum(me:r) released in July last year. The group continue to promote as eight as Cube states Yan An did not participate in Pentagon's first full album promotions.

The album contains eleven tracks with the lead single "Dr. Bebe" composed by member Hui with Nathan and Yunji. The album features member Jinho, Hui, Wooseok, Kino, Yeo One, Hongseok, Shin Won, and Yuto who participated in the album process.

== Background ==
It was revealed in GQ Korea's February 2020 interview with Pentagon that the title song for their upcoming studio album has been confirmed. Member Kino states that the song is produced by Hui and it is a concept that Pentagon has never done before.

Leader Hui stated the reason why it's "black hall" and not "black hole" is because it means it is the space in which Universe (fandom name) and Pentagon walk hand in hand together. According to member Kino, the album is the culmination of all their previous works and it also represents a new start for them. Three months prior to its release, Hui written and thrown away 5 songs, and finished 9 songs which were not included, but 3 songs were included in the album. During the group's album showcase, Wooseok revealed that his lower back hurts during practicing for the title song, but is in the midst of recovery.

== Release ==
On January 30, Cube shared the time schedule for the group upcoming comeback as "Pentagon's 1st Full Album [UNIVERSE : THE BLACK HALL]", which the group revealed their group image on February 4 and 5, and followed with audio snippet on February 6. On February 10, Cube released the music video teaser for title track "Dr. Bebe".

The album was released through several music portals, including MelOn, iTunes, and Spotify.

== Composition and lyrics ==
The title song "Dr. Bebe" is an electronic genre based on hip-hop rhythm. The song contains four themes 'Love, Fall, Hurt and Crazy' it is talking about repeated 'bridle of love' that everyone falls in love with, breaks up, get hurts, goes crazy and loves again. "Asteroid" is an up-tempo pop genre with synth-pluck sound, groovy drumbeats and unique synth line added to the song's ambience. The medium tempo "Shower of Rain" based on the hip-hop genre with easily with lyrics and lyrical melody portrays a man crying in the rain to hide the tears flowing from the heartbreak. "Die For You" contains a love story that happened after he was abandoned by his ex-lover. The song is composed by member Kino with an inspiration of Harley Quinn from the movie Suicide Squad. "Talk" is a sensual R&B ballad song featuring the stories of old lovers who don't dare to know each other's hearts. Member Jinho and Wooseok participated in the writing. "The Black Hall" is an EDM dance song made through a collaboration between Hui and duo Flow Blow who together produce "Never" and "energetic" in 2016. "Worship U" is a trendy and energetic medium tempo synth-pop that tells a story of a man whose life has changed through his love and promises to his lover that her love her until the end of his life. Oriental guitar and synth sound creates "Zoom Up" a dreamy and mysterious atmosphere with heavy bass and groovy rhythm song. "Camelia" is a modern rock ballad song produced and written by member Yuto. Through the meaning of camellia, the song depicts memories that Pentagon and Universe spent together in the past 3 years. The album also contains two special tracks, "Someday" that has the vocals of Jinho and Hui, and "Happiness (Korean Ver.)" is a newly released Korean version of "Happiness" which was the double title song of Pentagon's 2nd Japanese single Happiness/Sha La La.

Tamar Herman of Billboard magazine called the title track "dynamic in its propulsive angst with pounding choruses, rapidfire raps, and melodic showcasing the diverse tones of the eight members.

== Track listing ==
Universe: The Black Hall track listing
No.	Title	Lyrics	Music	Arrangement	Length
1.	"Dr. BeBe" (Dr. 베베)	Hui; Wooseok	Hui; NATHAN; Yunji	NATHAN; Yunji	3:11
2.	"Asteroid" (소행성)	Lee Seu-ran (이스란) (Jam Factory (music publisher)); Wooseok	Andrew Choi; Coach & Sendo; minGtion; Oh Seung-eun; Andreas Baertels	minGtion	3:27
3.	"Shower of Rain" (빗물 샤워)	Hui; Wooseok	Hui; Minit	Minit	3:16
4.	"Die for You"	Kino; NATHAN; Wooseok	Kino; NATHAN	NATHAN	3:35
5.	"Talk"	Jinho; Wooseok	Albin Nordqvist; Sebastian Lestapier; Adam Alexander	Albin Nordqvist; Sebastian Lestapier; Adam Alexander	3:06
6.	"The Black Hall"	Hui; Wooseok	Hui; Flow Blow	Flow Blow	3:09
7.	"Worship U"	Wooseok; earattack	earattck; Jimmy Claeson	earattack; Larmook	3:17
8.	"Zoom Up"	CODE 9; PURAVIDA	CODE 9; PURAVIDA	PURAVIDA	3:16
9.	"Camellia" (동백꽃)	Yuto; Wooseok; FCM Houdini	FCM Houdini; Yuto; FCM Rimbaud	FCM Houdini; Yuto; FCM Rimbaud	3:28
10.	"Someday" (Song by Jinho and Hui) (Special)	IMAGES; POPKID	IMAGES; POPKID	IMAGES; POPKID	3:57
11.	"Happiness" (Korean ver. Special)	Kino; Yuto; Wooseok	Kino; 홍익인간; 멧돼지(S2 EVOLUTION)	홍익인간; 멧돼지(S2 EVOLUTION); Gayeoni(가여니)	3:24
Total length:					37:06

== Promotions ==
On January 28, 2020, Pentagon released a forty-one second-long album trailer video. The video revealed Pentagon's logo shining brightly into a black hole after several intersecting images of the universe, with the release date of Pentagon's first studio album. The album was supposed to accompany by a fan showcase but Cube Entertainment decided to cancel it due to the COVID-19 pandemic. Only a live showcase without the attendance of fans was broadcast live on Vlive.

Cube held Uni Hall outside Cafe 20 Space: The Mint Universe from February 12 to March 1, 2020.

On December 12, 2019, a media showcase was held to commemorate the release of the group's first regular album at YES24 Live Hall in Gwangjin-gu, Seoul.

The group began promoting their title track "Dr. Bebe" on February 13 on Mnet's M Countdown performing together with "Camellia", followed by performances on KBS' Music Bank, MBC's Show! Music Core, and SBS' Inkigayo.

Pentagon continue their promotion activities with follow-up song "Shower of Rain" starting March 12, on MCountdown.

== Music video ==
The music video for the title track was released at midnight, 00:00 KST, on the 12th through Pentagon's official YouTube channel. The music video was meant to be released at the same time as the digital music release but due to the overwhelming response, it was brought forward to midnight on the 12th. The music video showed the members facing terrors raging over love and encountering a variety of dangerous encounters.

On February 14, the official lyrics and dance practice video for "Dr. Bebe" was released on both Pentagon's official YouTube and V Live channel.

On February 16, the music video surpassed 10 million views making it their fastest music video to reach it since debut. Pentagon also released "Dr. Bebe"'s performance version music video on February 17.

=== Analysis ===
In M2, Kino stated that in "Dr. Bebe"'s music video, the remaining members are all his alter ego. The video presents two sides, Upside which means reality and Downside means inner feelings. The Upside shows how they are foolishly waiting for their loved ones and slowly turning into madness, while the Downside shows how they tried to escape from the pain of love. Both sides are connected by the metronome. Also, the trailer of the music video showed Hui during "Shine" with the paper aeroplane, and it changed colour as it landed on "Dr. Bebe"'s music video set. This represents how "A boy that wanted to experience love, finally experienced it, and feel the pain when he broke up".

== Accolades ==
Year-end lists
Critic/Publication	List	Work	Rank	Ref.
South China Morning Post	Top 15 K-pop albums of 2020	Universe: The Black Hall	—N/a	
Dazed	40 Best K-pop songs of 2020	"Dr. Bebe"	31	

== Charts ==
Sales chart performance for Universe: The Black Hall
Chart (2020)	Peak position
Japanese Albums (Oricon)	14
South Korean Albums (Gaon)	3

== Release history ==
Release formats for Universe: The Black Hall
Region	Date	Format	Label
South Korea	February 12, 2020	CD; digital download; streaming	Cube Entertainment; Kakao M; U-Cube
Various	February 12, 2020	Digital download; streaming	Cube Entertainment; Kakao M; U-Cube

== See also ==
- List of 2020 albums
- 2020 in South Korean music
