= Daisy (Pentagon song) =

Song by Pentagon

- Chinese and Japanese version digital cover

Single by Pentagon

from the album WE:TH
- Released: October 12, 2020
- Studio: Cube Studio
- Genre: K-pop; alternative rock
- Length: 3:09
- Label: Cube; Universal Music
- Songwriters: Lee Hoe-taek; Jung Woo-seok; Lee Kyochang
- Producers: Hui; Wooseok; 네이슨 (NATHAN)

Pentagon singles chronology
"Basquiat" (2020)	"Daisy" (2020)	"Eternal Flame" (2020)

Music video
- "Daisy" on YouTube

"Daisy" (Korean: 데이지; RR: Deiji) is a song recorded by South Korean boy group Pentagon, released on October 12, 2020, by Cube Entertainment as the lead single of the group's tenth extended play WE:TH. The song was written by members Hui and Wooseok, alongside producer Nathan.

"Daisy" was described as a song that contains a sad feeling that everyone would have experienced after a breakup. Lyrically, the song has a dual meaning as the flower language 'daisy' overlaps the meaning of hope, peace, innocence and hopelessness, and the meaning of 'burn in pain and emotion.' Wooseok added saying, "It looks bright but not that bright." The choreography of this song incorporates movements such as making flowers with hands or turning with hands on top of their heads, calling it the 'Sowing Dance' in which daisy seeds are transferred to make flowers.

Ten days after their 4th year anniversary, Pentagon gained their first ever music show win since their debut on SBS MTV's The Show with 8,470 points.

A Chinese and Japanese version of the song was released on October 28, 2020, simultaneously.

== Background ==
The title song, "Daisy" was written after Road to Kingdom. Member Shinwon revealed "At first, Hui hyung played a demo song, and I thought 'it was already good' even before we officially started working on the album. Maybe that's why I waited comfortably. I liked the song. I wasn't worried."

"I like the rock genre these days, so I thought about what kind of subject would be good. Putting the keyword on 'empathy', I thought that 'love' is a theme that can easily and universally relate to many people. I took the heartbreaking love as the theme, and when I see it in the movie, I always remember saying they said, 'Be happy and be well' after the heartbreaking love. In fact, in my mind, I was wondering if there was a feeling that I would like to 'being a little less happier than me', so I honestly wrote down that feeling in a straightforward way.

— Hui on the meaning of "Daisy",

Regarding the keyword 'empathy', Yeo One said, "We are singers, and I think that the job of being a singer is a job of speaking in songs. I wrote the lyrics with the desire to heal the wounds of the listeners and double the joy with the lyrics of the song. You will be able to relate to it." Kino participated in the song's album artwork, choreography and daisy challenge's choreography.

== Composition and lyrics ==
"I had this initial idea but I could not move forward. I could not make any progress, and I was just sitting in my studio for like 3-4 days worrying about it. Then, I saw Wooseok passing by and I asked for his help and that's how it happened."

— Hui talking about Wooseok helping him in composing "Daisy".

The song is in the key of F major, 85 bpm with a running time of 3:09 minutes. "Daisy" is an alternative rock genre song that was sung with a sad and sad heart that everyone would have experienced after the breakup. The lyrics are expressed by the use of daisy flowers. The white flower as the sign of hope as a metaphor for love and progress focusing on the ambiguous meaning that describes how one will eventually get burned by that love. Pentagon member explained, "After the breakup, I portrayed the feelings wishing that the other person would be happy while wishing they could miss you because they could not meet someone better than me." The track features heartbreaking and realistic sentiments in a straightforward lyrics.

== Reception ==
Choo Seung-Hyun of the Korea Economic Daily wrote that the group "turned 180 degrees into a romantic and lyrical atmosphere compared to their previous songs" and praised the group for trying various genres and various concepts.

== Commercial performance ==
The song debuted at number 111 on South Korea's Gaon Digital Chart on the chart issue dated October 11–17, 2020.

== Track listing ==
- Download and streaming
1. "Daisy" – 3:09
- Digital single
1. Daisy (Japanese Ver.) – 3:09
2. Daisy (Chinese Ver.) – 3:09

== Credits and personnel ==
Credits are adapted from NetEase Music.

- Pentagon – vocals
  - Hui – producing, songwriting
  - Wooseok – producing, songwriting
- 네이슨 (NATHAN) – producing, audio engineer
- yunji – audio engineer
- Shōko Fujibayashi – Japanese lyrics
- Z KING – Chinese lyrics, guide

== Live performance ==
On October 18, 2020, Pentagon performed "Daisy" on KBS Open Concert, and Kang Han-na's Volume Up - Lake Music Festival. On October 19, they performed several songs including "Daisy" on KakaoTV Comeback Show Mu:Talk Live. On October 31, Pentagon performed "Daisy" at Korea Music Drive-In Festival (KMDF 2020).

== Promotion ==
Pentagon kicked off promotions by appearing on Naver Now 5 Minutes to 6, and KBS Cool FM Park Won's Kiss the Radio on October 12. The group appeared on V Live's LieV on October 13. It is their second appearance since "Shine" in 2018. October 17, they held a video call fan signing event with Ktown4u at a studio in Hongdae, Seoul. Hui, Yanan, Yuto and Wooseok appeared as guests on October 18 episode 380 of TVN's Comedy Big League and performed a preview of "Daisy". On October 19, Pentagon was scheduled to perform on KakaoTV Comeback Show Mu:Talk Live and communicate in real time with fans through a live talk session in the KakaoTalk open chat room. The same day, they appeared on U+ Idol Picknic, Gems' Idol Art Museum, and Naver Now Ha Sung-woon's Late Night Idol show. On October 20, the group announced that they partnered up with Richining to hold We:th Taiwan Video Call Fansign Event on November 21. Hui appeared as guest on Naver Now radio show, Jukjae's Late Night Studio Band. On October 21, Pentagon appeared on K-BOB Star, and KT Seezn's Back to the Idol. On October 31 and November 1, Pentagon held Listening Party @Spotify with Universe.

To promote the song, Pentagon launched the hashtag #데이지챌린지 and #Daisy_Challenge on various social media platforms such as TikTok, Twitter and Instagram. Numerous South Korean artists participated in the challenged, including Got7's Yugyeom, Cho Seung-youn, Chungha, Yoo Seon-ho, Angelina Danilova, Kard, and Eric Nam.

On October 17, Cube released 'Pentagon Daisy', a cronut with vanilla custard and raspberry jam fillings which was inspired by the song. The bread is available for a limited time at Cube's bakery, Cubaker in Seongdong-gu, Seoul.

The group promoted the song with a series of live performances on various music programs starting with Mnet's M! Countdown on October 15, followed by performances on KBS's Music Bank, MBC's Show! Music Core, SBS's Inkigayo, SBS MTV's The Show, and MBC Music's Show Champion.

Global platform Makestar prepared a special gift with Pentagon. Makestar opened a one-on-one video call event by selecting 15 winners per member through a lottery from among fans who have purchased the album from the Pentagon's project page from October 26 until October 31.

== Music video ==
An accompanying music video for "Daisy" was uploaded on 1theK and Pentagon's official YouTube channel on October 2, 2020, at 6:00 pm KST. The music video unravels the story of 8 kinds of wound through symbolic visuals and metaphorical images of each member. Pentagon members lying crouched down in a space of different colors and moods, one after another, in a space of different colors and moods, from a space filled with yellow candles and smoke, to a dark night street where rain falls like torrential rain, to a table that has become a mess and a burning bush. It gave a strong impact to those who appeared. When asked about the behind of the shooting, Wooseok saying, "I blew up a car." And then he replied, "There was a scene that fell in the rain outdoors, but it was a time when it was getting cold, so I was filmed while shaking my whole body." Regarding the scene underwater, Kino replied "I have been fond of water since I was a child. After receiving scuba training for filming, I filmed for 5 hours, and I thought I would die." He continued, "During the training, I learn to control water pressure, but I failed once in the middle. If you send a rescue signal, you will come to rescue within 3 seconds, but I couldn't stand 3 seconds. I felt like I was going to die. For the first time in my life, I felt that water was scary. It was so hard, but it was so much fun. But the 5 hour filming underwater was about 1.5 seconds in the music video." The epilogue of the music video follows the separation depicted through vivid colors and vibrant emotions.

The music video surpassed 4 million views in 30 hours after the release. On October 16, the video exceeded 8.51 million views on YouTube.

A lyric video for the song was released on October 15.

A dance practice video for "Daisy" was released on October 16.

A choreography video was released to commemorate the 10 million views on October 19, 5 days after its release.

A performance video was released on November 1.

== Accolades ==
Music program award
Program	Date	Ref.
The Show (SBS MTV)	October 20, 2020	

Year-end lists
Critic/Publication	List	Rank	Ref.
Time	10 songs that defined K-pop's year in 2020	—N/a	
Paper	40 Best K-Pop Songs of 2020	6	

== Charts ==
=== Weekly charts ===
Chart (2020)	Peak position
South Korea (Gaon Digital)	111
South Korea (Gaon Download)	4

== Release history ==
Region	Date	Format	Version	Distributor
Various	October 12, 2020	Digital download; streaming	Korean	Cube; Kakao M; U-Cube
Various	October 28, 2020	Digital download; streaming	Japanese	Cube; Kakao M; U-Cube
Various	October 28, 2020	Digital download; streaming	Chinese	Cube; Kakao M; U-Cube
