= Pentagon (South Korean band) =

South Korean boy group

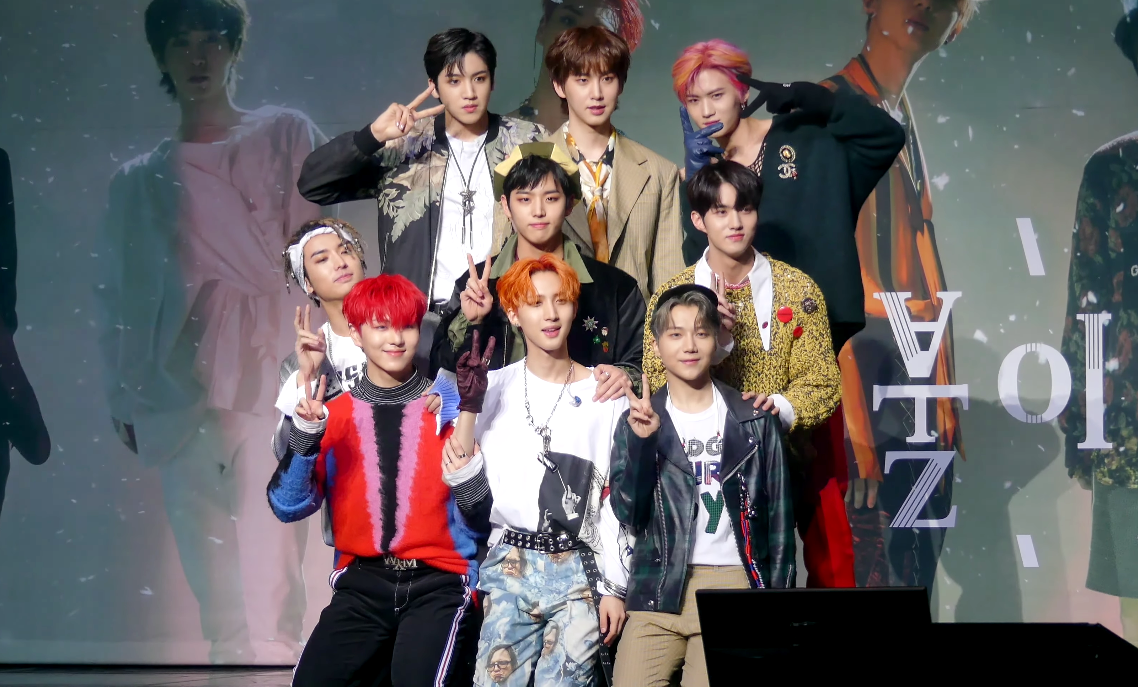
- Pentagon in March 2019; (L–R, back to front: Wooseok, Shinwon, Yan An, Yuto, Hongseok, Yeo One, Kino, Hui, and Jinho)

Background information
- Origin: Seoul, South Korea
- Genres: K-pop; electronic; dance-pop
- Years active: 2016–present
- Labels: Cube; Universal Japan
- Members: Jinho; Hui; Hongseok; Shinwon; Yeo One; Kino; Wooseok
- Past members: E'Dawn; Yan An; Yuto
- Website: Official Korean website

Pentagon (Korean: 펜타곤; stylized in all caps; abbreviated as PTG) is a South Korean multi-national boy band formed by Cube Entertainment in 2016. They were introduced through the Mnet survival show Pentagon Maker. Pentagon released their self-titled debut EP on October 10, 2016.

The current group members are Jinho, Hui, Hongseok, Shinwon, Yeo One, Kino and Wooseok. Pentagon was originally composed of ten members; E'Dawn left the group on November 14, 2018, and as of July 21, 2026 the group announced the departures of members Yan An and Yuto.

== Name ==
The group name Pentagon refers to becoming a perfect group by completing the five elements that an idol must have: vocal/rap, dance, teamwork, talent, and mind.

== History ==
=== Pre-debut ===
In 2010, Hui was a trainee at JYP Entertainment after winning first place on Best Male Vocal at JYP 7th Audition Final Round. He also competed in the first season of Chinese Idol but failed to make the cut. Kino was a member of a dance team called Urban Boyz. In December 2013, Hui, E'Dawn, Yeo One, and Kino participated in the special stage dance at the KBS Song Festival. In February 2014, E'Dawn and Kino danced at Jirayu Tangsrisuk's 1st concert "James Ji Monkey King Fan Meeting". Jinho debuted under the stage name Jino as a member of SM the Ballad. Hongseok participated in Mnet and YG Entertainment's reality survival show Mix and Match. However, he failed to become a member of the winning boy group, iKon. He and Jinho joined Cube Entertainment in 2015. Yan An and Yuto (the latter of whom is a former JYP Entertainment trainee) passed the "Cube Star World Audition" overseas selection and became Cube trainees in 2014. In February 2015, Jinho and Hui participated in a vocal project group Seorin-dong Children (서린동 아이들) and released a remake of Lee Won-jin and Ryu Keum-deok's 1994 classic "For All the New Lovers".

On December 31, 2015, Cube Entertainment revealed that they would debut their third boy group, after Beast and BtoB, named Pentagon.

=== 2016: Pentagon Maker, debut with Pentagon and Five Senses and Japanese debut ===
On April 26, 2016, Cube Entertainment introduced Pentagon with the trailer, "Come into the World". The group's official Twitter, Facebook and Weibo opened on the same day.

The group participated in South Korean television channel Mnet's reality program, Pentagon Maker, which aired online through Mnet's digital content brand M2. The team was based on five categories: vocal or rap, dance, talent, mind, and teamwork. Each member was judged individually or as a unit, to determine whether they were suitable to become a member of Pentagon. They were set to debut on July 16, 2016. By the end of the show, Jinho, Hui, Hongseok, Yeo One, Yuto, Kino, and Wooseok were confirmed as the official members of the group.

On July 9, Pentagon released the collaboration songs "Young" (produced by Dok2) and "Find Me" (produced by Tiger JK). A music video for "Young", featuring members Hui, Yeo One, Kino, Wooseok, and Yuto, was released. The group was originally scheduled to host their debut concert on July 23, 2016, at Jamsil Indoor Stadium, but Cube Entertainment delayed the concert and debut date of the group due to internal issues.

Pentagon made their official debut on October 10, 2016, with 10 members, including the members eliminated from Pentagon Maker, E'Dawn, Shinwon, and Yan An. On the same day, Pentagon released their first Korean EP Pentagon comprising seven tracks including the lead single "Gorilla", and held their debut showcase. The EP peaked number seven on the Gaon chart and remained top 10 for two consecutive weeks in the Japan's Tower Record Kpop weekly chart. On October 24, Shinwon was not able to participate in the promotions due to knee injury. On November 4, Cube revealed that Pentagon would be making their official debut in Japan on December 10, 2016. On November 7, Pentagon held their first fan signing with an attendance of 100 people. Pentagon received the nickname "King Kongdol" due to their gorilla dance in their debut song "Gorilla".

The group held their first solo concert, "Pentagon Mini Concert Tentastic Vol. 1", on December 6 at the Yes24 Live Hall in Gwangjin District, Seoul. The tickets for the concert were sold out within eight minutes of going on sale. They gave a sneak preview of their new song "Can You Feel It" ahead of their comeback.

On December 7, the group released their second EP Five Senses. Rappers Wooseok and Yuto contributed lyrics to the lead single of the EP titled "Can You Feel It". It was described as a medium-tempo hip-hop song that combines strong beat with a cheerful guitar riff and an intense brass sound.

On December 10, Pentagon held their first showcase in Japan at Toyosu Pit, Tokyo, Japan, with more than 3,000 people attending. On December 11, Pentagon appeared in Abema TV 'Fresh!' Kpopstarz and recorded over 340,000 live viewers. The group recorded at least four times the average live viewers of Beast, VIXX, B.A.P, Boyfriend, and U-Kiss, and has the second highest number of viewers in the history of the program. Pentagon set three 'high speed' records, including the fastest group to debut in Japan, fastest domestic solo concert, and the fastest concert to sold out. Pentagon participated in Cube Entertainment's Christmas season song, with their label mates Hyuna, Jang Hyun-seung, BtoB, Roh Ji-hoon and CLC. "Special Christmas" was released digitally on December 12, 2016, as a Christmas gift for fans.

Pentagon ranked 9 on Billboard's 10 Best New K-Pop Groups In 2016.

=== 2017: "Pretty Pretty", rise in popularity in Japan, Gorilla, Ceremony, Demo_01 and Demo_02 ===
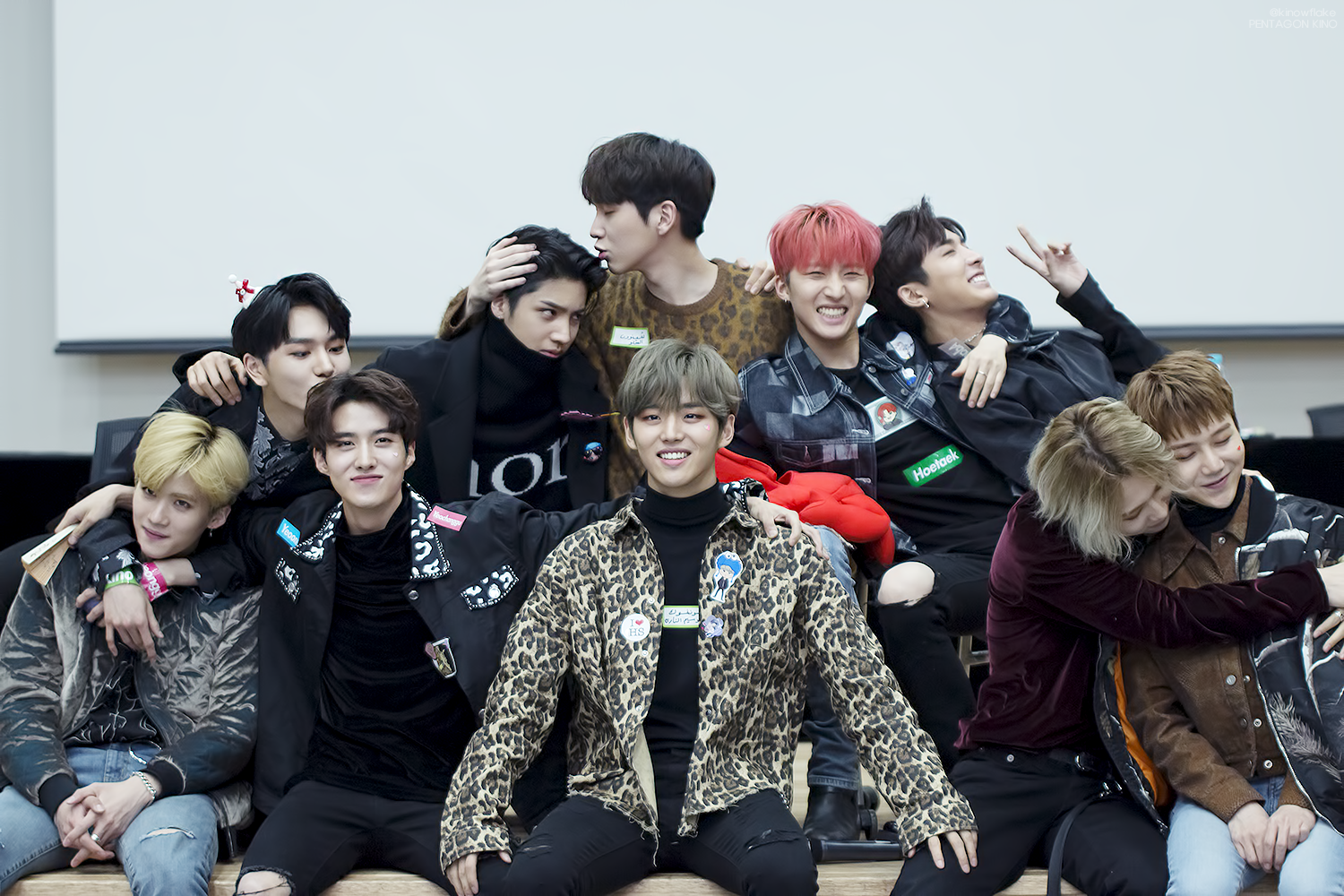
Pentagon at fansign on December 17, 2017.

On January 22, 2017, Pentagon released a special music video for "Pretty Pretty", a track from their second Korean EP Five Senses, featuring I.O.I's Kim Chung-ha.

On March 29, Pentagon released their first Japanese EP Gorilla, which debuted at number six on the Gaon chart and third on the Oricon Chart. The album contains six tracks, including Japanese versions of previously released tracks "Gorilla", "Can You Feel It", "Pretty Pretty", and "You Are", along with two new Japanese tracks, "Hikari" and "Get Down". Pentagon sold out a reservation for their special mini live & talk concert at Shinagawa Stellaball in Tokyo to commemorate the release of their first Japanese EP on March 24. More than 5,000 people applied to attend but due to the capacity limit, only a total of 4,000 seats were available. According to Japan's Tower Records, Gorilla was ranked first in the album charts throughout the day and peaked at third place on Oricon's Daily Album Chart with debut sales of 10,292 copies. On March 3, Gorilla took first place in the Japanese Tower Records Monthly Chart and the group became the fastest to achieve first place in the Japanese chart.

On May 18, the group released the single "Beautiful", a ballad produced by label-mate Jung Il-hoon. The group held their three-day concert titled "Tentastic Vol. 2 'Trust'" from June 10–12 at the Shinhan Card Fan Live Hall. The concert was divided into "P day", "T day", and "G day" and showcased different concepts and performances. Tickets to the concerts were sold out in ten minutes.

On June 12, the group released their third Korean EP Ceremony that includes the pre-released single "Beautiful" and the lead single "Critical Beauty" (예뻐죽겠네). The EP became their first U.S. chart entry, arriving on Billboard's world chart at number 14. Member Yan An was unable to participate in the album promotions and activities due to a right-hand injury sustained on May 31, 2017. On July 24, they released a surprise music video for their fans, "To Universe". On the same day, Pentagon received their first rookie award at Asia Model Awards.

In September, they released a short film "When I Was in Love" starring Gong Seung-yeon ahead of the comeback. On September 6, the group released their fourth Korean EP Demo_01 which includes the lead single "Like This", produced by Hui. The EP marked their first all self-composed songs since debut. They also held their third solo concert, "Pentagon Mini Concert Tentastic Vol. 3, 'Promise'" at the Yes24 Live Hall in Gwangjin District, Seoul. The group made a special appearance on television series, Hello, My Twenties! 2, that was aired on JTBC. Pentagon received their second rookie award at 1st Soribada Best K-Music Awards on September 20, followed by the Rising Star Award at Korea Music Festival Special Awards.

On October 10, one year after debut, Pentagon hit 10,000 likes on MelOn for "Like This".

They released a pre-release song, "Stay" on November 14, which featured Pentagon's vocalists. On November 22, the group released their fifth Korean EP Demo_02 which includes the lead single "Runaway", the second single to have been produced by Hui. The group subsequently held their fourth solo concert, "Pentagon Mini Concert Tentastic Vol. 4, 'Dream'" at Blue Square I-Market Hall in Seoul. The following day, the group released a special music video, "Violet". The song is a sentimental song composed by Kino and co-written by E'Dawn, Yuto and Wooseok.

Pentagon's Gorilla EP took third place in the K-pop Japan Top 10 album.

=== 2018: Violet, Positive, Shine, E'Dawn's departure, and Thumbs Up! ===
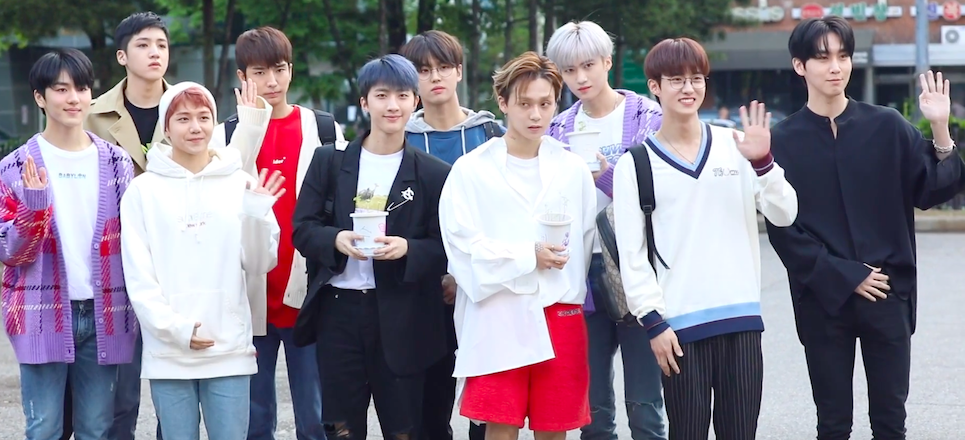
Pentagon in May, 2018.

On January 17, 2018, Pentagon released their second Japanese EP Violet. The EP debuted at number one on Tower Record weekly album chart and ranked fourth in the Oricon Weekly Album Chart. They held their last solo concert, "Pentagon Mini Concert Tentastic Vol. 5, Miracle" on April 1 at Blue Square I-Market Hall, Seoul.

On April 2, Pentagon released their sixth Korean EP Positive which features six tracks including lead single "빛나리 (Shine)". The song eventually becoming a sleeper hit by word of mouth from listeners due to its unique melody and powerful choreography. Since its release, the lowest it placed on Melon's daily chart was in the 500s, but it slowly rose to number 186 on April 29. A month after its release, on May 1, the track rose to number 95 on Melon's real-time chart. The single peaked at number 16. "Shine" debuted at number 85 on Gaon Digital Chart and peaked at number 27. Subsequently, the company announced that the promotion period was extended by two weeks. They made their debut on Top 10 Billboard's World Digital Song Sales chart.

On August 18, Pentagon held their first fan meeting in Japan "僕たちの第一歩 (Our First Step)". The Japanese version of "Shine", released on 29 August, was used as the opening song of TV Asahi's late-night music program series Break Out throughout the month.

On September 10, Pentagon released their seventh Korean EP Thumbs Up!, which features five tracks including lead single "청개구리 (Naughty Boy)". E'Dawn and Yan An were absent from the comeback. After Hyuna announced her relationship with E'Dawn in August, on September 13, Cube Entertainment announced that they would be terminating their contracts, citing that they could not "maintain trust" with them. On November 14, Cube Entertainment officially confirmed E'Dawn's departure from the group and company.

Pentagon made their first appearance on an episode of Immortal Songs on October 6, 2018. The theme for the episode was "Korean Lyric Awards Special", and they performed a rendition of Kim Wan-sun's classic hit "The Pierrot Smiles At Us", a song recorded and released in 1990. The group received 383 points but lost to Jung Dong-ha by one point. On November 25, the group held a fan meeting "PENTAGon MOVINGon" at Nakano Sun Plaza, Tokyo with an attendance of 2,000 people. It was their first activity since E'Dawn's departure.

In Japan, Shine ranked 4th and Violet ranked 10th on Oricon's 2018 Indie Albums. Violet also ranked 8th on Tower Records' list of 2018 K-Pop Domestic Albums.

=== 2019: Debut in Japan, Genie:us, Sum(me:r) and first world tour ===
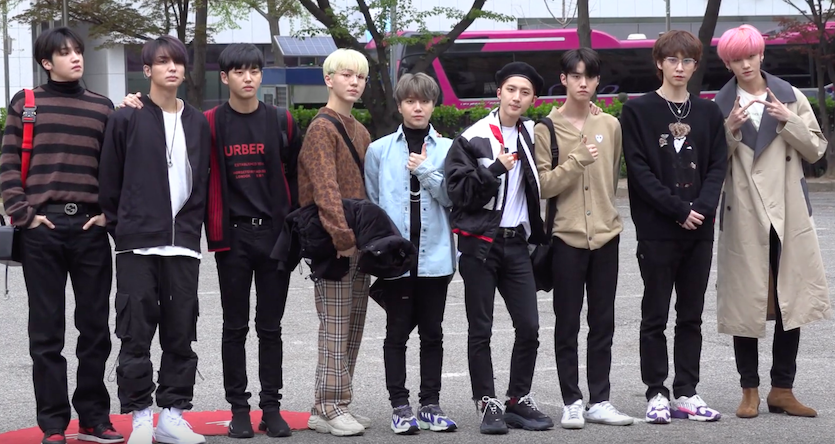
Pentagon in April, 2019.

Pentagon held their first Japan Zepp tour - Dear Cosmo Tour across Osaka, Nagoya, Tokyo, and Fukuoka. Pentagon had their Japanese debut in February with the single, Cosmo, composed and written by Teru. The song ranked no.1 on the Oricon chart.

On February 24, they held their second fan club fan meeting 'UNIONE' (Let's Play with Pentagon) at Olympic Hall. On March 27, they released their eighth Korean EP Genie:us with the lead single "신토불이 (Sha La La)". Kino was not able to participate in performances due to an injury but participated in all other promotional activities. However, he was able to participate in Pentagon's follow-up song "Spring Snow".

In April, Pentagon appeared again on Immortal Songs 2 as a contestant, performing Kim Yeon-ja's "Nation of Morning" in Japan as part of the show's 400th episode special. Pentagon held their first solo-concert "Prism" on 27 and April 28, 2019 at Blue Square iMarket Hall. The tickets were sold out in a day. On May 2, Cube Entertainment announced Pentagon's first world tour concert, Prism World Tour, with 15 cities worldwide and 16 shows. On June 16, Pentagon represented South Korea in the annual Star of Asia in Almaty, Kazakhstan that gathered more than 20,000 people at the Medeu High-Rink. In July, Pentagon announced an additional eight cities for their Prism world tour, which covered twenty-three cities worldwide. On July 22, Cube Entertainment announced that Yan An would not be able to participate in the world tour for medical reasons.

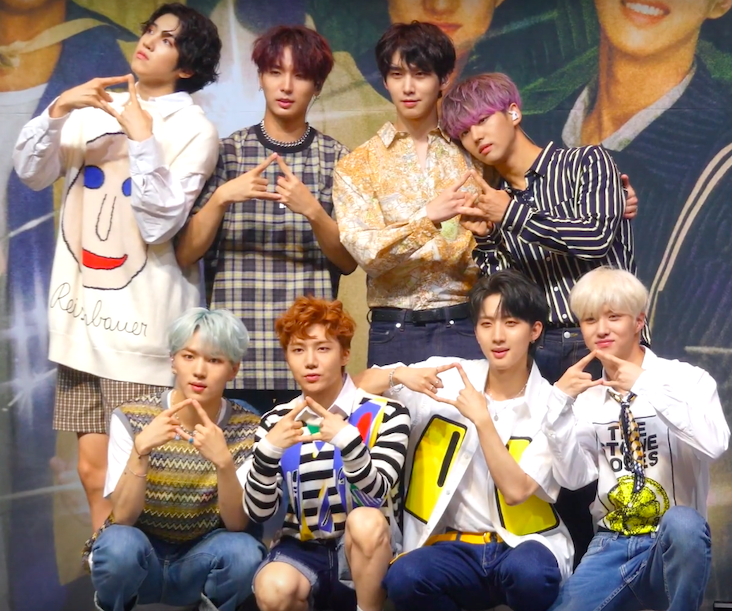
Pentagon at Sum(me:r) showcase on July 17, 2019.

They released their ninth extended play Sum(me:r) on July 17, without Yan An, with lead single "Humph!" being co-produced by Giriboy and Hui.

=== 2020: Universe: The Black Hall, Road to Kingdom, Yan An's return, Universe: The History, We:th and "Eternal Flame" ===
On February 12, Pentagon released their first full album, Universe: The Black Hall with the lead single "Dr. Bebe". The group continued to promote as eight as Yan An did not participate in the promotions. Their first studio album features 11 tracks that were co-written or featured lyrics by members Jinho, Hui, Wooseok, Kino, and Yuto. The music video was brought forward to midnight KST on February 12 due to the overwhelming response. Pentagon continued their promotion activities with follow-up song "Shower of Rain" starting March 12, on MCountdown.

On March 5, Pentagon collaborated with Japanese rock music icon Glay in "I'm Loving You" as a part of Glay's 25th anniversary album Review II-Best of Glay. The song was described as a genre-bending song of an upbeat Latin-inspired dance-pop song with a killer electronic breakdown.

Pentagon participated in Mnet's reality television competition Road to Kingdom, which aired from April to June. For the first round Song of King, the group performed Hui's arrangement of Block B's "Very Good" with reimagined Mad Max concept. They were ranked second in the first contest rankings. For the second round with the theme of 'My Song', Pentagon chose "Shine + Spring Snow" (빛나리+봄눈) as songs that best captured their team's story. It was the last time Pentagon would perform together before the eldest member Jinho enlisted for his mandatory military service as an active duty soldier on May 11, 2020. When the song transitioned from "Shine" to "Spring Snow", a video message made by members except Jinho played, containing their sincere feelings toward Jinho. They were placed third in the first elimination round. Pentagon and ONF took first place in the collaboration stage of the first round on the 3rd round, performing a reinterpretation of Blackpink's "Kill This Love", and second round, Pentagon performed Monsta X's "Follow" with a Pharaoh theme. On June 12, the group released a new song "Basquiat" for the program's finale, and finished in third place overall.

In September, the song "Humph" which was released on July 17, 2019, became a hot topic on social media and internet communities. Korean netizens opined "the song is perfect for the COVID-19 pandemic situation. The lyrics 'Do not cross the line Stop / No access to there are no access / Oh you have crossed the line right now / Oh, please keep it', the youthful melody and cute choreography of the song is good to use in a campaign to encourage social distancing." This song became popular in memes and MV views increased accordingly.

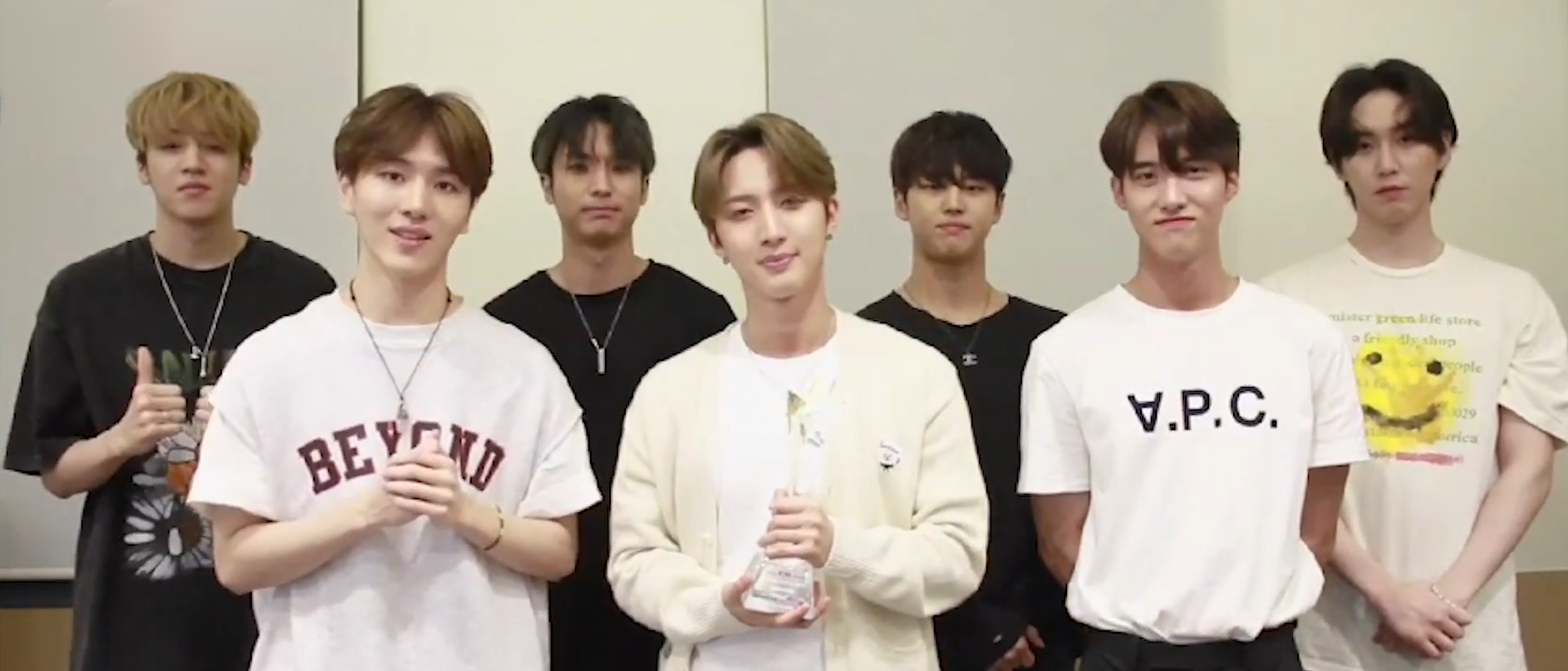
Pentagon with Ten Asia's Top Ten Award on September 1, 2020.

On September 6, they held an online fan meet and concert called Pentag-on Air, where they performed various songs, including a non-released acoustic English version of the song, "Spring Snow". 70% of attendees were international fans and 30% were domestic fans. On September 16, Pentagon released the song "Twenty-Twenty", which was the first OST for the web drama Twenty-Twenty. The song was composed by Kino and contains lyrics written by Kino and Wooseok. On September 17, Pentagon posted a teaser titled "I've been keeping an eye on you" showcasing Yan An, officially ending his 440-day hiatus.

On September 23, the group released their first Japanese studio album (second album overall), Universe: The History. The album included Japanese songs from their debut EP, Gorilla, and debut singles "Cosmo" and "Happiness / Sha La La". The album debuted at number 7 on Oricon Albums Chart, and number 8 on Billboard Japan Hot Albums.

On October 12, Pentagon released their tenth extended play, We:th, as an eight-member group without member Jinho, who was completing his mandatory military service. The lead single, "Daisy", is an alternative rock song with a trendy yet intense sound, produced by Pentagon members Hui and Wooseok, and composer Nathan. The album consists of six songs, including "I'm Here", a self-composed solo song by Jinho. We:th became their highest selling album by selling 64,045 physical copies on the first week of release. On October 20, the group earned their first music show win after four years with "Daisy" on SBS MTV's The Show. On October 28, the group released the official Chinese and Japanese version of the song. On November 10, Pentagon began hosting their first podcast with DIVE Studios, titled Pentagon's Jack Pod. In December, Pentagon held a live online concert 2020 Pentagon Online Concert [WE L:VE] on December 13.

On December 18, Pentagon released the digital single "Eternal Flame".

=== 2021: Love or Take and Do or Not ===
On January 28, Pentagon released "Honey Drop" as the first OST for the web drama Replay: The Moment. Hui enlisted for his mandatory military service as a social service worker on February 18. In the meantime, all of the members distributed his role among themselves without an assigned temporary leader. The group cameoed in the web drama Nickname Pine Leaf for the SBS YouTube channel yogurD in March. On March 15, Pentagon released their eleventh extended play Love or Take with the lead single "Do or Not".

On June 14, Pentagon released their fourth Japanese EP, Do or Not, which contains the Japanese version of the lead single of the same name. On August 18, members Yuto, Kino and Wooseok collaborated to release the digital single "Cerberus".

Jinho was discharged from military service on November 14, without returning to the unit after his final vacation, according to the Ministry guidelines for preventing the spread of COVID-19. On November 24, Kino tested positive for COVID-19.

=== 2022: In:vite U and Feelin' Like ===
On January 24, Pentagon released their twelfth extended play In:vite U with the lead single "Feelin' Like".

On February 21, it was announced that Yan An would be going to see his family for personal matters and stay with them for the time being. As of December 2022, he has yet to return and no further statement regarding his future in the group has been made.

On March 4, it was confirmed that Pentagon's fan meeting, Pentagon's Private Party, will be held on April 2 and 3. On May 3, Hongseok enlisted for his mandatory military service as an active duty soldier.

On August 9, Kino made his solo debut with the special digital single "Pose", making him the first member of Pentagon with an official solo debut.

On September 14, Pentagon released their fifth Japanese EP, Feelin' Like, which contains the Japanese version of the lead single of the same name.

=== 2023–2025: Pado and contract renewals ===
In April, Pentagon announced a two-day concert in Tokyo to be held in late May, making it their first Japanese concert in over eight months. On May 10, they released a Japanese digital single "Shh". On August 30, Pentagon released their sixth Japanese language EP Pado, with the lead single "Pado (Wave to Me)". On September 9, they released the song "Love is Pain", a remake of "不如" by Chinese singer Qin Haiqing, as a part of NSMG's project Perfect Match.

On October 9, 2023, Cube Entertainment announced that Yeo One, Yan An, Yuto, Kino, and Wooseok did not renew their contract with the company, though the group would not be disbanding. The following day, exactly seven years after their debut, they surprise released the digital single "With Universe", which was described as "a letter from Pentagon to Universe". In November, Hongseok terminated his exclusive contract with Cube Entertainment. Shinwon enlisted as part of his mandatory military service on December 21. He was discharged on September 20, 2025.

On April 15, 2025, Cube Entertainment announced that the contract with Jinho had ended. In May, members Hui and Jinho hosted the Japanese travel show Colorful Japan: Pentagon in Shikoku. In July, Hui's contract with Cube had also come to an end.

=== 2026–present: Lineup changes and anniversary reunion ===
Pentagon made their first official appearance at the 33rd Hanteo Music Awards on February 15, 2026, where they performed "With Universe" and "Shine". Pentagon was celebrated as the sole recipient of Hanteo's 10th Anniversary Influential Artist award.

On July 21, 2026, Pentagon announced they will proceed as a 7-member group following the departures of Yan An and Yuto. The group also announced a 10th anniversary project including a new single and tour later in the year.

Pentagon's 10th anniversary single "Coward" was released on September 11th, 2026, marking their first comeback since 2023.

== Other ventures ==
=== Endorsements ===
Before the official debut of Pentagon, the ten members were chosen as new models of Econeko & Sausando's Organic Ice Cream Bubble Cleanser in 2016. On August 18, 2016, school uniform brand Elite announced their collaboration with Pentagon and I.O.I as their new models. In 2017–19, they became the advertising models for D'Live+ OTT set-top box. On April 16, 2021, Pentagon promoted the Thai juice brand Tipco.

=== Ambassadorship ===
On September 27, 2017, Pentagon has been appointed as an honorary ambassador of the Korea Copyright Protection Service at the 1st anniversary of Korea Copyright Protection Office and Future Vision 2021. On June 24, 2020, Korea's Red Cross Youth appointed Pentagon as their new ambassador.

=== Philanthropy ===
In September 2018, Pentagon donated 50 million won (approximately US$44,500) to Gangnam Severance Hospital's Respiration Rehabilitation Center for patients with rare neuromuscular disease. Pentagon's leader Hui said,

"Our agency's CEO is suffering from ALS, and we're very aware of it. So we know that the public awareness of these illnesses is very low and that there aren't many policies or economic support. Starting with our small act, we hope that people become more aware of it."

== Members ==
Adapted from their Naver profile.

=== Member ===
- Jinho (진호) – vocalist
- Hui (후이) – leader, vocalist, dancer
- Hongseok (홍석) – vocalist
- Shinwon (신원) – vocalist
- Yeo One (여원) – vocalist
- Kino (키노) – dancer, vocalist, rapper
- Wooseok (우석) – rapper, vocalist

=== Former ===
- E'Dawn (이던) – rapper, vocalist, dancer (2016–2018)
- Yan An (옌안) – vocalist (2016–2026)
- Yuto (유토) – rapper, dancer, vocalist (2016–2026)

== Discography ==
Korean albums

- Universe: The Black Hall (2020)

Japanese albums

- Universe: The History (2020)

== Filmography ==
=== Television shows ===
- Road to Kingdom (Mnet, 2020)

=== Reality shows ===
- Pentagon Maker (Mnet-M2, 2016)
- Pentory (Naver V App, YouTube, 2016–present)
- Pentagon's Textbook (Naver V App, 2016–2018)
- Pentagon's Private Life (MBC HeyoTV, 2016–2017)
- Pentagon's To Do List (Naver V App, 2017)
- Pentagon's TNL (Thursday Night Live) (Naver V App, 2017) (YouTube, 2019)
- Just Do It Yo! (YouTube, 2018–present)
- Pentagon X Star Road (Naver V App, 2019–2020)
- Colorful Japan: Pentagon in Shikoku (KNTV, 2025)

=== Drama ===
- Spark (Naver TV Cast, 2016)
- Hello, My Twenties! 2 (JTBC, 2017)

== Concert and tours ==
=== Headlining tours ===
- 1st Japan Zepp tour - "Dear Cosmo Tour" (2019)
- Prism World Tour (2019)

=== Headlining concerts ===
- Pentagon Mini Concert Tentastic Vol.1 - Love (2016)
- PENTAGON 1st Concert in Japan (2017)
- Pentagon Mini Concert Tentastic Vol.2 - Trust (2017)
- Pentagon 2017 Tentastic Live Concert in Japan (2017)
- Pentagon Mini Concert Tentastic Vol.3 - Promise (2017)
- Pentagon 2017 Tentastic Live Concert in Tokyo (2017)
- Pentagon Mini Concert Tentastic Vol.4 - Dream (2017)
- PENTAGON! Great Live Concert in Japan 2018 Your Whiteday (2018)
- Pentagon Mini Concert Tentastic Vol.5 - Miracle (2018)
- Pentagon concert "PRISM" (2019)
- 2020 Pentagon Online Concert [WE L:VE] (2020)
