= Basquiat (song) =

2020 song by Pentagon

Single by Pentagon

from the album Road to Kingdom Final
- Released: June 12, 2020
- Genre: dance-pop; electronic rock
- Length: 3:18
- Label: Stone Music
- Songwriters: Hui; Wooseok
- Producers: Hui; Nathan; Wooseok; Yunji

Pentagon singles chronology
| "Shine + Spring Snow" (2020) | "Basquiat" (2020) | "Daisy" (2020) |

Music video
- "바스키아(Basquiat)" on YouTube

"Basquiat" (바스키아) is a song by Pentagon, a South Korean boy group who participated in a reality boy group survival show, Road to Kingdom. It was released digitally on June 12, 2020. The song is the fourth song from the extended play Road to Kingdom Final. Pentagon finished the show as the series' second runner-up. It is a dance-pop and electronic rock song that was inspired by Jean-Michel Basquiat's paintings, with lyrics that revolve around a message about "regaining freedom."

== Music and lyrics ==
"Basquiat" is a dance song of the electronic rock genre. This song was inspired by Jean-Michel Basquiat's paintings, and it is a song that contains a message about "regaining freedom" to many who live in oppression and neglect. The specific lyrics "I'm the new Basquiat, look down at me / see the meaningless crown light down / Shine Mother Nature's View / God bless you / fly up in search of the answer." Member and composer Hui responded,

"I found myself contemplating such a song that I could win by competing like this. I felt like I was losing the identity of the music I was pursuing. I wrote lyrics containing the belief that I would walk."

Reporter Son Hwa-sin wrote, "Pentagon talked about winning and losing, the shell of competition, and the meaninglessness of the crown. They conveyed this message through this song....The passage 'no meaning' is impressive. From the standpoint of Mother Nature and God, the fierce and bloody fights of humans may be really meaningless. And the really important thing is to fly up in search of your own answer."

== Live performances ==
Pentagon performed "Basquiat" for the first time in the Road to Kingdom final live broadcast on June 18, 2020. The final stage started with an intro video of someone being chased or rebelliously screamed by someone. Hui showcased his sixth treble in the second half of the song gave an exhilarating thrill and said, "I resist the gaze created by the times / My crown, I write and write for myself" and ended with Pentagon members who raised their hands toward the sky, leaving a strong reverberation and afterglow for those who go beyond the spleen. At the end of the stage, the following phrase appeared as a message penetrating this song, "I resist the gaze created by the times. My crown is made and written by myself."

== Reception ==
Several Korean media outlets wrote, "Pentagon built the genre of 'Pentagon' with energetic performance and music in 'Road to Kingdom', and captured the hearts of the viewers perfectly, making it a strong winner."

== Promotion ==
"Basquiat" intro VCR was released on June 19. Pentagon released a group concept image and video of the song "Basquiat" through their official homepage and SNS on June 22. The posts uploaded contain images of the members' backs, short videos moving forward with black flags in the blazing wasteland, with description "#Pentagon 'Basquiat' Coming soon". On June 21, 2020, the group performed the single on KCON:TACT 2020 Summer. After releasing the track "Basquiat" on music streaming sites on June 12, a concept image and videos were released beginning June 23 until June 30, 2020.

== Credits and personnel ==
Credits are adapted from Melon.

- Pentagon (except Jinho and Yan An) – vocals
  - Hui – producing, songwriting
  - Wooseok – producing, songwriting, rap arrangement
- 네이슨 (NATHAN) – producing, record engineering, piano, synthesizer, string
- Yunji – producing, record engineering, piano, synthesizer, string
- Soulman – chorus
- Kim Ho-hyun – guitar
- Jeon Hoon – guitar
- Jeon Jae-hee – chorus
- 전부연 (Cube Studio) – Recording
- Shin Jae-bin (Cube Studio) – mixed
- Kwon Nam-woo (821 Sound mastering) – mastering

== Charts ==
| Chart (2020) | Peak position |
|---|---|
| South Korea (Gaon Download) | 23 |
