= Yuto Adachi =

Japanese rapper (born 1998)

- 安達 祐人
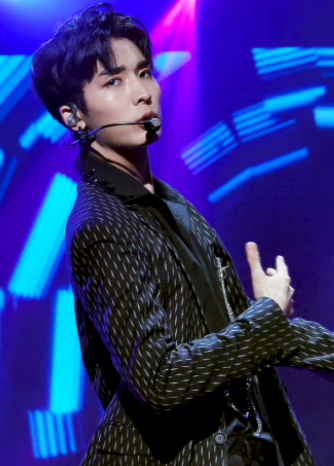
- Yuto in September 2017
- Born: January 23, 1998 (age 28); Nagano, Nagano Prefecture, Japan
- Occupations: Rapper; singer; dancer
- Musical career
- Genres: K-pop; hip hop; dance
- Years active: 2016–present
- Labels: RINK; Cube
- Formerly of: Pentagon
- Website: cubeent.co.kr/pentagon

Japanese name
- Kanji: 安達 祐人
- Hiragana: あだち ゆうと
- Katakana: アダチ ユウト
Transcriptions
- Romanization: Adachi Yūto

Yuto Adachi (安達 祐人, Adachi Yūto; born January 23, 1998), known mononymously as Yuto (Korean: 유토; Japanese: ユウト), is a Japanese rapper, singer and dancer. He was a member of the South Korean boy group Pentagon.

== Early life and education ==
Yuto was born on January 23, 1998, in Nagano, Japan. He is the youngest of a family of three children with one sister and one brother. He got interested in K-pop since he was in grade 4 elementary school. After seeing K-pop groups such as TVXQ and Girls' Generation together with his sister on television, he was fascinated with their vocal skills, synchronized dance, and visual.

In an interview with BuzzFeed Japan, he said "I was not interested in music. I was the type who don't listen to music, and just played sports such as baseball and soccer. However, when I heard about K-pop for the first time, I got attracted and after that, gradually being more into it." After becoming a middle school student, he became a K-pop fan. He danced to K-pop choreography with friends together and uploaded choreography videos to the internet. Later, he applied to the global audition opened in Japan by a Korean entertainment company when he was in grade 2 middle school. However, he was rejected because he was too young. During the reading session set in the morning in his middle school, he studied Korean and imitated dancing while watching K-pop videos. People around him recognized his affection for K-pop. In the graduation article collection of his middle school yearbook, he wrote "I want to become a big star." He was the school baseball and soccer player and a member of dance club which he would perform on stage for his school festival every year.

At 15 years old, he moved to Korea after persuading his parents several times. He aimed to be the first Japanese male K-pop artist "[but] my skills was completely insufficient." During his trainee days, Yuto's grandfather had died. However, he continued his practice with his grandfather's encouragement letter. Yuto trained for 3 1/2 years as a trainee before debuting with Pentagon.

== Career ==
=== Pre-debut and Pentagon Maker ===
Yuto was a former JYP Entertainment trainee. He passed "Cube Star World Audition" global selection and became a Cube Entertainment trainee in 2014. In 2015, Yuto participated in 2015 Idol Star Athletics Ssireum Basketball Futsal Archery Championships. At the championship, Yuto teamed with Goaldae-Sliga alongside Doo-joon and Yoseob of Beast, and Roh Ji-hoon, and took the gold medal in the men futsal.

In 2016, Yuto joined as survival candidate in a South Korean television reality program Pentagon Maker, hosted by Cube Entertainment and co-produced by Mnet. Though he was initially in the bottom four in the first elimination, he was save in the ninth week after performing "Young" (Prod. by Dok2) with his team. On July 9, "Young" was released on various online music sites. In episode 9, week 10 of Pentagon Maker, Yuto performed Block B's "Very good" alongside Jinho and Wooseok for the 3 vs 3 vs 3 match, where the confirmed member were selected as unit leaders and each team includes the elimination candidates including Yuto. As a result of the final mission, Yuto's team won first place in the unit performance. Thus, he was excluded from the candidate for elimination after completing his Pentagraph and joined as Pentagon's 6th member. Before the group officially debuted, Yuto made his first cameo on Yeo One's web drama Spark, alongside fellow Pentagon members Hui, E'Dawn and Wooseok.

=== 2016–2025: Debut with Pentagon and solo activities ===
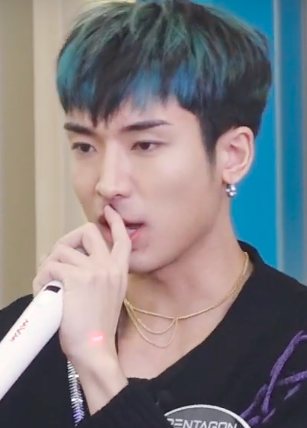
Yuto in April 2020

On October 10, 2016, Yuto officially debuted as a member of Pentagon with their first extended play Pentagon. He is the lead rapper and lead dancer in the group. Less than two months later, Yuto participated in Pentagon's second extended play Five Senses. He co-wrote the song "Engine", making this his first Pentagon's song after debuting as a Pentagon member. In 2017, he made a cameo in the drama Hello, My Twenties! 2 with his bandmates as a member of Asgard. On September 24, Yuto challenged his first role as the MC for Japan-Korea 10th Anniversary KMF2017 which was held at Yokohama Arena. In 2018, Yuto co-hosted 69th Sapporo Snow Fest 10th Anniversary K-POP FESTIVAL 2018 along with Monsta X's Hyungwon and Target's Woojin. The MCs were selected for being born in a year in which the Olympics took place, Yuto was born in 1998 during Nagano Winter Olympic. In June 2021, Yuto began hosting his own bimonthly segment on Mnet Japan's program Mnet BANG!.

In early 2023, Yuto became the co-host of the TV Tokyo program Who is your next? The Klobal Stage alongside ONF's U. On October 9, it was announced that he had left Cube Entertainment alongside fellow Pentagon members Yeo One, Yanan, Kino, and Wooseok. By the end of the month, he had signed with RINK Entertainment, moving his activity base to Japan.

Yuto released his first extended play Dat Girl, featuring the lead single "Dat Girl" and three other songs, on December 13.

On April 30, 2025, Yuto announced he would be fully restarting his solo career in Japan, signing with companies STARBASE and Horipro. He subsequently announced the release of his first EP album Blue Spring on May 14, feating lead single "Blue Spring" and three other songs. He was later featured in the Glay song "Unleashed", which was released in December.

=== 2026–present: Produce 101 Japan: Shinsekai and departure from Pentagon ===
In January 2026, Yuto was announced as a Rap Trainer for the fourth season of Produce 101 Japan, titled Produce 101 Japan Shinsekai.

On July 21, 2026, Cube Entertainment announced the departure of Yuto and Yan An from Pentagon, and that the group would continue its activities with 7 members.

== Personal life ==
Yuto has expressed his fondness towards Shinee's song "Lucifer" in many of his interview. He also confessed that his role model is Taemin from the same group. Yuto is known to have a low-tone voice especially during rapping.

== Discography ==
=== Extended plays ===
List of extended plays, showing selected details and chart positions
Title	Details	Peak chart positions
Title	Details	JPN
Dat Girl	Released: December 13, 2023; Label: RINK; Formats: CD, digital download, streaming	15
Blue Spring	Released: May 14, 2025; Label: Starbase Records; Formats: CD, digital download, streaming	—

=== Singles ===
List of singles as lead artist, showing chart positions, year released, and album name
Title	Year	Peak chart positions	Album
Title	Year	JPN	Album
"Dat Girl"	2023	—	Dat Girl
"Blue Spring"	2025	—	Blue Spring
"—" denotes a recording that did not chart or was not released in that territory

=== Other songs ===
Year	Title	Format	Ref.
2019	"Kuro"	Digital download, streaming	
2020	"Pencil"	Digital download, streaming	
2020	"Sight(視線)"	Digital download, streaming	
2020	"Flower"	Digital download, streaming	
2020	"You are the main character"	Digital download, streaming	
2020	"Dreamer"	Digital download, streaming	
2020	"Honki" ft. Houdini	Digital download, streaming	
2021	傷〜wounds〜	Digital download, streaming	
2022	"You Don't Have to Try Hard" (頑張らなくてもいいよ)	Digital download, streaming	

== Songwriting credits ==
All credits are adapted from the Korea Music Copyright Association, unless stated otherwise.

=== Solo work ===
Year	Song	Featured artist	Album	Lyrics		Music	
Year	Song	Featured artist	Album	Credited	With	Credited	With
2018	"Trust Me"	Wooseok & E'Dawn	Non-digital single	Yes	E'Dawn, Wooseok	Yes	Wooseok, E'Dawn

=== Pentagon albums/singles ===
Year	Song	Album	Lyrics		Music		Arrangement	
Year	Song	Album	Credited	With	Credited	With	Credited	With
2016	"Young (젊어)" (Prod. by Dok2)	Digital Single	Yes	Hui, Yeo One, Kino, Wooseok	Yes	Hui, Yeo One, Kino, Wooseok, Dok2	No	—N/a
2016	"Back"	Digital Single	No	—N/a	Yes	E'Dawn, Hui, Hongseok, Kino	No	—N/a
2017	"Engine"	Five Senses	Yes	Ferdy, Kang Dong-ha, Wooseok	No	—N/a	No	—N/a
2017	"Nothing"	Ceremony	Yes	Kang Dong-ha, Ra Young-ssi, E'Dawn, Wooseok, Seo Jae-woo	No	—N/a	No	—N/a
2017	"Spectacular" (스펙터클 해)	Ceremony	Yes	Son Young-jin, Jo Sung-ho, E'Dawn, Wooseok	No	—N/a	No	—N/a
2017	"To Universe" (소중한 약속)	Ceremony	Yes	E'Dawn, Jinho, Wooseok	No	—N/a	No	—N/a
2017	"Get That Drink" (멋있게랩) (sung by rap unit)	Demo_01	Yes	E'dawn, Wooseok	Yes	E'dawn, Wooseok	No	—N/a
2017	"When I Was in Love" (설렘이라는건)	Demo_01	Yes	Hui, E'Dawn, Wooseok	No	—N/a	No	—N/a
2017	"One More Night" (오늘까지만)	Demo_01	Yes	Ferdy, E'Dawn, Jinho, Wooseok	No	—N/a	No	—N/a
2017	"Like This"	Demo_01	Yes	Hui, E'Dawn, Wooseok	No	—N/a	No	—N/a
2017	"Violet"	Demo_02	Yes	E'Dawn, Wooseok, Kino	No	—N/a	No	—N/a
2017	"Runaway"	Demo_02	Yes	Hui, E'Dawn, Wooseok	No	—N/a	No	—N/a
2017	"Pretty Boys" (sung by rap unit)	Demo_02	Yes	E'Dawn, Wooseok	No	—N/a	No	—N/a
2017	"All Right"	Demo_02	Yes	Son Young-jin, Jinho, E'Dawn, Wooseok	No	—N/a	No	—N/a
2018	"Shine"	Positive	Yes	Hui, E'Dawn, Wooseok	No	—N/a	No	—N/a
2018	"Think About You" (생각해)	Positive	Yes	Jinho, Kang Dong-ha, E'Dawn, Wooseok	No	—N/a	No	—N/a
2018	"Off-Road"	Positive	Yes	Kino, E'Dawn, Wooseok	No	—N/a	No	—N/a
2018	"Do It for Fun" (재밌겠다) (sung by rap unit)	Positive	Yes	E'Dawn, Wooseok	No	—N/a	No	—N/a
2018	"Shine" (Japanese ver.)	Shine	Yes	Hui, E'Dawn, Wooseok	No	—N/a	No	—N/a
2018	"Naughty Boy" (청개구리)	Thumbs Up!	Yes	Hui, E'Dawn, Wooseok	No	—N/a	No	—N/a
2018	"Just Do It Yo" (저두요)	Thumbs Up!	Yes	Hui, Shinwon, Kino, Wooseok	No	—N/a	No	—N/a
2018	"Skateboard"	Thumbs Up!	Yes	Kino, E'Dawn, Wooseok	No	—N/a	No	—N/a
2018	"When It Rains at Night" (밤에 비가 내리면)	Thumbs Up!	Yes	Kino, Wooseok	No	—N/a	No	—N/a
2019	"Alien" (에일리언)	Genie:us	Yes	Hui, Shinwon, Wooseok	No	—N/a	No	—N/a
2019	"Round 1"	Genie:us	Yes	Hui, Jinho, Hongseok, Shinwon, Yeo One, Yanan, Wooseok, Kino	Yes	Hui, Jinho, Hongseok, Shinwon, Yeo One, Yanan, Wooseok, Kino, Mospick	No	—N/a
2019	"Spring Snow" (봄눈)	Genie:us	Yes	Kino, Wooseok	No	—N/a	No	—N/a
2019	"Lost Paradise" (Hip Hop Unit)	Genie:us	Yes	Hui, Wooseok, Kino	Yes	Hui, Wooseok, Kino, NATHAN	No	—N/a
2019	"Round 2"	Sum(me:r)	Yes	Hui, Jinho, Hongseok, Shinwon, Yeo one, Yanan, Wooseok, Kino	Yes	Hui, Jinho, Hongseok, Shinwon, Yeo one, Yanan, Wooseok, Kino, Mospick	No	—N/a
2020	"Camellia" (동백꽃)	Universe: The Black Hall	Yes	Wooseok, FCM Houdini	Yes	FCM Houdini	Yes	FCM Houdini
2020	"Happiness" (Korean Ver.)	Universe: The Black Hall	Yes	Kino, Wooseok	No	—N/a	No	—N/a
2020	"Eternal Flame" (불꽃)	Digital Single	Yes	Kino, Wooseok, Universe	No	—N/a	No	—N/a
2021	"Don't Worry 'Bout Me"	Do or Not	Yes	Kino, Wooseok, Shoko Fujibayashi	No	—N/a	No	—N/a
2021	"Dazzling" (眩しい君と)	Do or Not	Yes	Houdini, KushitaMine	Yes	Houdini	Yes	Houdini

=== Other works by Pentagon ===
Year	Song	Artist	Album	Lyrics		Music		Arrangement	
Year	Song	Artist	Album	Credited	With	Credited	With	Credited	With
2020	"Genius"	Pentagon feat. Pentagon's dads	Non-digital single	Yes	Hui, Shinwon, Kino, Wooseok	No	—N/a	No	—N/a

=== Other artist ===
Year	Song	Artist	Album	Lyrics		Music		Arrangement	
Year	Song	Artist	Album	Credited	With	Credited	With	Credited	With
2018	"Young & One"	United Cube	Digital single	Yes	Seo Jae-woo (Tenten), Seo Yong-bae (Tenten), BreadBeat (Tenten), Hyuna, Minhyuk, Peniel, Yeeun, Eunbin, E'Dawn, Wooseok, Soyeon	No	—N/a	No	—N/a
2020	"Hollow"	Houdini	Digital single	No	—N/a	Yes	Houdini	Yes	Houdini
2020	"I'm the Trend"	(G)I-dle	Dumdi Dumdi	No	—N/a	Yes	FCM Houdini, Minnie, Yuqi	Yes	Houdini

== Filmography ==
=== Television shows ===
Year	Title	Role	Network	Notes	Ref.
2021–2022	Mnet BANG!	Co-host	Mnet Japan	with Furuya Masayuki and AKB48's Miu Shitao	
2023	Who is your next? The Klobal Stage	Co-host	TV Tokyo	with ONF's U	
2026	Produce 101 Japan Shinsekai	Rap trainer	Lemino		

=== Variety shows ===
Year	Title	Network	Notes	Ref.
2016	Pentagon Maker	Mnet	Contestant	

=== Dramas ===
Year	Title	Role	Network	Notes	Ref.
2016	Spark		Naver TV	Cameo	
2017	Hello, My Twenties! 2	Member of idol group Asgard	JTBC	Cameo	

=== Radio shows ===
Year	Title	Notes	Broadcaster
2024–present	K-STAR CHART presents POP-K TOP10 Friday	Solo DJ	Tokyo FM

=== Hosting ===
Year	Title	Notes	Ref.
2017	10th Anniversary KMF2017	with NCT's Yuta	
2018	69th Sapporo Snow Fest 10th Anniversary K-POP FESTIVAL 2018	with Monsta X's Hyungwon and Target's Woojin	
2023	KCON Japan 2023		
