= Sum(me:r) =

EP by Pentagon
- Released: July 17, 2019
- Genre: K-pop
- Length: 12:46
- Language: Korean
- Label: Cube Entertainment; Kakao M
- Producer: Giriboy; Hui; Minit; Albin Nordqvist; Andreas Öberg; Jinho; Hongseok; Shinwon; Yeo One; Yan An; Yuto; Kino; Wooseok; MosPick

Pentagon chronology
| Genie:us (2019) | Sum(me:r) (2019) | Universe: The Black Hall (2020) |

Alternative cover
- Digital cover

Singles from Sum(me:r)
- 1. "Humph!" Released: July 17, 2019

Music video
- "Humph!(Prod. By GIRIBOY)" on YouTube

Sum(me:r) is the ninth extended play by South Korean boy group Pentagon. The album was released on July 17, 2019 by Cube Entertainment under Kakao M distribution. Member Yan An did not participate in the activities for health reasons.

The song was released through several music portals, including MelOn, iTunes, and Spotify.

In September, 2020, "Humph" went viral on social media and internet communities. A Korean news outlet called the song "perfect for the COVID-19 pandemic situation." The lyrics "Do not cross the line Stop / No access to there are no access / Oh you have crossed the line right now / Oh, please keep it" evoke messaging from social distancing campaigns. This resulted in the rapid increasing of the number of direct cam videos and music videos from the "Humph" music broadcast on YouTube.

This album's title Sum(me:r) represents 'me' (Pentagon) being put in the sum function along with the letter 'r' which stands for "romance, rock n' roll, relax, and role".

== Promotions ==
Pentagon held a live showcase at Blue Square Samsung Card Hall in Hannam-dong, Seoul before the release of the EP on July 17, where they performed "Humph!" along with "Fantasystic".

On July 17, Pentagon held a premiere showcase hosted by Mnet that was released over the Mnet K-POP and Mnet-M2 YouTube and Facebook channels to fans worldwide at 8pm (KST). They performed their title track "Humph!" and two other new songs, a total of four stages. On the same day, they appeared on MBC Every 1's Weekly Idol and Idol Radio. The group appeared as guests on JTBC's Run.wav (런웨이브) to promote the album, making their debut on the show.

Pentagon made their comeback stage starting July 17, 2019 through the music program The Show, Show Champion, M Countdown, Music Bank, and continued promoting the single on Inkigayo.

== Music video ==
"Humph!" was released alongside a music video that turns the members of Pentagon into schoolboys part of a baseball club, where they don uniforms featuring the New York Yankees' logo. Though only eight of Pentagon's nine members appear in the music video, the voice of Yan An, who did not participate in group activities due to an injury, can be heard on the single.

== Track listing ==
| No. | Title | Lyrics | Music | Arrangement | Length |
|---|---|---|---|---|---|
| 1. | "Humph!" (접근금지) (produced by Giriboy) | Hui; Giriboy; Wooseok | Giriboy; Hui | Giriboy | 3:12 |
| 2. | "Fantasystic" (판타지스틱) (produced by Giriboy) | Hui; Wooseok | Giriboy; Minit; Hui | Giriboy; Minit | 3:13 |
| 3. | "Summer!" | Jinho; Wooseok | Yuto; Albin Nordqvist; Andreas Öberg | Albin Nordqvist; Andreas Öberg | 3:07 |
| 4. | "Round 2" (Bonus track) | Jinho; Hui; Hongseok; Shinwon; Yeo One; Yan An; Yuto; Kino; Wooseok | Jinho; Hui; Hongseok; Shinwon; Yeo One; Yan An; Yuto; Kino; Wooseok; MosPick | MosPick | 3:14 |
| Total length: | | | | | 12:46 |

== Accolades ==
Year-end lists
| Critic/Publication | List | Rank | Work | Ref. |
|---|---|---|---|---|
| BuzzFeed | The 30 Best K-pop Music Videos of The Year | 10 | "Humph!" music video | |
| BuzzFeed | 30 Songs That Helped Define K-Pop in 2019 | 20 | "Humph!" | |
| SBS PopAsia | Top 100 Asian pop songs of 2019 | 51 | "Humph!" | |

== Charts ==
| Chart (2019) | Peak position |
|---|---|
| Japanese Albums (Oricon) | 49 |
| South Korean Albums (Gaon) | 4 |
| US World Album (Billboard) | 12 |

== Release history ==
| Region | Date | Format | Label |
|---|---|---|---|
| South Korea | July 17, 2019 | CD; digital download; streaming | Cube Entertainment; Kakao M |
| Various | July 17, 2019 | Digital download; streaming | Cube Entertainment; Kakao M |
