= Yeo One =

South Korean singer (born 1996)

- 여원
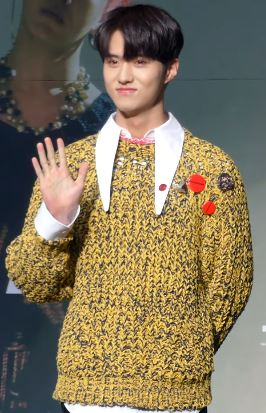
- Yeo One in March 2019
- Born: Yeo Chang-gu; March 27, 1996 (age 30); Daejeon, South Korea
- Occupations: Singer; actor
- Musical career
- Genres: K-pop; R&B
- Instrument: Vocals
- Years active: 2016–present
- Labels: Cube; Universal Japan
- Member of: Pentagon
- Formerly of: United Cube

Korean name
- Hangul: 여창구
- Hanja: 呂暢九
- RR: Yeo Changgu
- MR: Yŏ Ch'anggu

Stage name
- Hangul: 여원
- RR: Yeo Won
- MR: Yŏ Wŏn

Yeo Chang-gu (Korean: 여창구; born March 27, 1996), better known by his stage name Yeo One, is a South Korean singer and actor. He debuted as a vocalist in a South Korean boy group Pentagon in October 2016. Aside from group activities as singer, he has also starred in various television and web dramas.

== Early life ==
Yeo One was born on March 27, 1996, in Daejeon, South Korea. He was a member of a school band and actively participated in band competitions.

== Career ==
=== Pre-debut ===
In December 2013, Yeo One participated in a special dance performance alongside future bandmates Hui, E'Dawn, and Kino at the KBS Song Festival. In 2014, Yeo One appeared in G.NA's "Secret" music video and promotional activities. In July 2015, he acted in Beast's Son Dong-woon's "Kimishika" music video. In August 2015, he modeled alongside Hyuna for the fashion brand Clride.n.

=== 2016–present: Debut with Pentagon and solo activities ===
He took part on Mnet's reality survival program, Pentagon Maker, which aired online through Mnet's digital content brand M2. On October 10, 2016, he made his debut as a member of Pentagon on Mnet's M Countdown with the track "Gorilla" from their debut extended play, Pentagon. The song is described as a hip-hop song with magnificent, strong beats and masculine brass sound. During the show's filming, he made his acting debut with a lead role in web drama Spark as the leader of an idol group, Dexter. The series was a commercial success and attracted global fans.

In 2017, Yeo One was selected as the main character of KBS1 musical drama Joseon Beauty Pageant that set during the Joseon Dynasty's first beauty contest held. The drama also incorporates with traditional music with modern sensation and colorful images.

In 2019, Yeo One participated in reading the novel Youth, Beautiful Youth by Hermann Hesse through Naver Audio Clip Audiobook. He was confirmed to be the lead role in web drama, Welcome to the Witch Shop. The drama deals with fantasy elements that is based on the theme of witch shops that can only be visible to people with eager wishes.

In 2020, Yeo One returned to the small screen as a fictionalized version of himself on the TV Chosun entertainment drama Somehow Family. The show aired in March 2020, but was suspended after only two episodes due to the non-payment of staff. The show resumed filming in June but, due to scheduling conflicts, Yeo One was replaced by Shin Won-ho of Cross Gene. In August, Yeo One was cast as Nigel Bottom in the Korean adaptation of the comedy musical Something Rotten!. The play ran from August 7 to October 18. Later that year, he was the cover model for the September 2020 issue of Men's Health Korea.

In February 2021, Yeo One starred in the web drama Nickname Pine Leaf for the SBS YouTube channel yogurD, where he plays two different versions of himself: PD Yeo Chang-gu and Pentagon's Yeo One. He appeared on the cover of Men's Health Korea for the second time in November.

In August 2022, he appeared in the KBS2 drama If You Wish Upon Me. Later that year, he starred in the King Sejong Institute Foundation web series There is an Idol in my Living Room as a fictionalized version of himself.

On October 9, 2023, it was announced that Yeo One had left Cube Entertainment alongside fellow Pentagon members Yan An, Yuto, Kino, and Wooseok. Later that month, he announced his first solo fan concert, to be held on November 25, which sold out within one minute.

In January 2024, Yeo One joined the reality music competition show Build Up: Vocal Boy Group Survival. In February, he held his first Japanese fan concert.

After Yeo One's military discharge, he embarked on his first Asia tour in 2026. He released his first digital single "Run It Up" on February 11.

== Personal life ==
=== Health ===
In February 2022, Yeo One suffered a back injury after a car accident caused by a drunk driver. He temporarily withdrew from Pentagon's activities to recover. The following month, he and fellow bandmate Wooseok tested positive for COVID-19.

=== Military service ===
Yeo One began his mandatory military service on May 28, 2024. He was discharged on November 27, 2025.

== Discography ==
Title	Year	Peak chart positions	Sales (DL)	Album
Title	Year	KOR	Sales (DL)	Album
Collaborations
"You Are" (with Jinho, Hui, Hongseok, Shinwon, Yan An, Kino)	2016	—	—N/a	Pentagon
"Run It Up"	2026	—	—	Non-album single
Soundtrack appearances
"Dancing Flower Scholar" (댄싱 꽃선비) with Kim Na-ni	2018	–	—N/a	Chosun Beauty Pageant OST; Part 1–13
"—" denotes releases that did not chart or were not released in that region.

=== Other songs ===
Year	Title	Format	Ref.
2017	"Let's Go" (가자)	Streaming	
2018	"토닥토닥"	Streaming	
2018	"Hope"	Streaming	
2019	"Her Voice" (그녀의 목소리)	Streaming	
2021	"Begin Again" (우리, 다시)	Streaming	

== Songwriting ==
All credits are adapted from the Korea Music Copyright Association, unless stated otherwise.

Year	Artist	Song	Album	Lyrics		Music		Arrangement	
Year	Artist	Song	Album	Credited	With	Credited	With	Credited	With
2016	Pentagon	"UP"	Non-album release	No	–	Yes	Jinho, Shinwon, Yan An, Wooseok	No	—N/a
2016	Pentagon	"Young"	Album single	Yes	Hui, Yuto, Kino, Wooseok	Yes	Hui, Yuto, Kino, Wooseok, Dok2	No	—
2017	Yeo One	"Let's Go" (가자)	—N/a	Yes	—	Yes	—	No	—
2018	Yeo One	"토닥토닥"	—N/a	Yes	—	Yes	—	No	—
2018	Yeo One	"Hope"	—N/a	Yes	—	Yes	—	No	—
2019	Pentagon	"Round 1" (Bonus track)	Genie:us	Yes	Jinho, Hui, Hongseok, Shinwon, Yan An, Yuto, Kino, Wooseok	Yes	Jinho, Hui, Hongseok, Shinwon, Yan An, Yuto, Kino, Wooseok, MosPick	No	—
2019	Yeo One	"Her Voice" (그녀의 목소리)	—N/a	Yes	—	Yes	—	Yes	—
2019	Pentagon	"Round 2" (Bonus track)	Sum(me:r)	Yes	Jinho, Hui, Hongseok, Shinwon, Yan An, Yuto, Kino, Wooseok	Yes	Jinho, Hui, Hongseok, Shinwon, Yan An, Yuto, Kino, Wooseok, MosPick	No	—
2021	Yeo One	"Begin Again" (우리, 다시)	—N/a	Yes	—	Yes	Ummzui	No	—
2026	Yeo One	"Run It Up"	Digital Single	Yes	Umzi	Yes	Umzi, Jeong Won-jae	No	—

== Filmography ==
=== Television series ===
Year	Title	Original title	Role	Notes	Ref.
2017	Hello, My Twenties! 2	청춘시대2	Tyr / Shin Chang-goo	A member of idol group Asgard	
2018	Joseon Beauty Pageant	조선미인별전	Kyu Hyun	Musical drama	
2020	Somehow Family	어쩌다 가족	Yeo One	Only two episodes, replaced by Shin Won-ho	
2022	If You Wish Upon Me	당신이 소원을 말하면	Kwak Hyeong-jun	Guest role	

=== Web series ===
Year	Title	Original title	Role	Notes	Ref.
2016	Spark	스파크	Ji Sung	Main role	
2019	Welcome to the Witch Shop	어서오세요, 마녀상점	Sung Woo	Main role	
2021	Nickname Pine Leaf	닉네임 솔잎	Yeo Chang-gu / Yeo One	Main role	
2021	Pumpkin Time	펌킨 타임	Han Se-jun	Supporting role	
2022	There is an Idol in my Living Room	거실에 아이돌이 산다	Yeo Chang-gu / Yeo One	Main role	

=== Variety shows ===
Year	Title	Notes	Ref.
2016	Pentagon Maker	Contestant	
2019	King of Mask Singer	Contestant as Cat Boy, episode 233	
2024	Build Up: Vocal Boy Group Survival	Contestant	

=== Narration ===
Year	Title	Notes	Ref.
2019	Naver Audio Clip Audiobook	Novel narrator, Hermann Hesse's Youth, Beautiful Youth	

=== Music videos ===
Year	Title	Ref.
2018	"Let's Go"	
2018	"토닥토닥"	
2021	"Begin Again"	

=== Theater ===
Year	Title	Original title	Role	Ref.
2020	Something Rotten!	썸씽로튼	Nigel Bottom	

== Awards and nominations ==
Name of the award ceremony, year presented, category, nominee of the award, and the result of the nomination
Award ceremony	Year	Category	Nominee / Work	Result	Ref.
APAN Music Awards	2020	Male Entertainer	Yeo One	Nominated	
