= Hongseok =

South Korean singer and actor

- 홍석
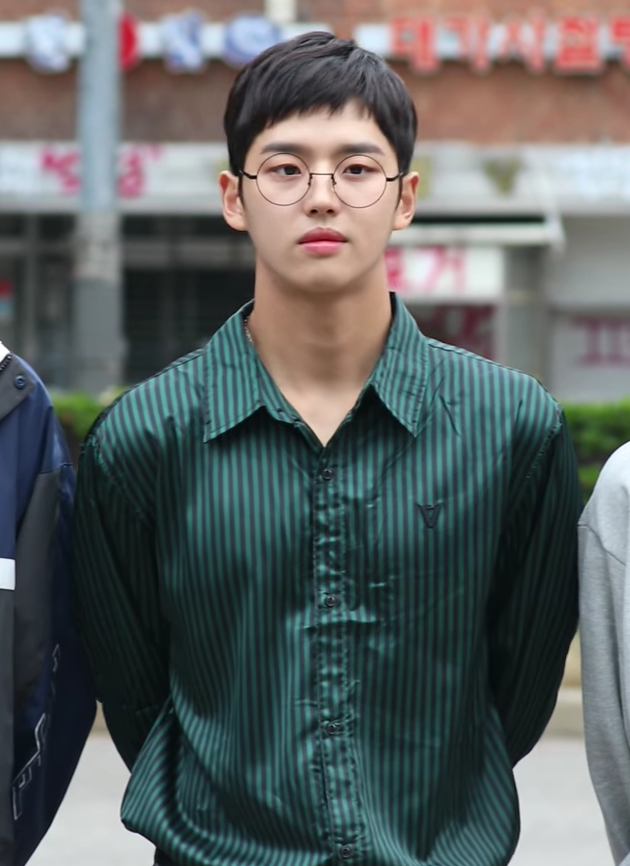
- Hongseok in September 2018
- Born: Yang Hong-seok; April 17, 1994 (age 32); Seoul, South Korea
- Occupations: Singer; actor
- Musical career
- Genres: K-pop; ballad; dance-pop
- Instrument: Vocals
- Years active: 2016–present
- Labels: Cube; Andmarq
- Member of: Pentagon

Korean name
- Hangul: 양홍석
- Hanja: 梁洪碩
- RR: Yang Hongseok
- MR: Yang Hongsŏk

Yang Hong-seok (Korean: 양홍석; born April 17, 1994), better known by the mononym Hongseok, is a South Korean singer and actor. He debuted as a vocalist of the group boy band Pentagon in October 2016. Aside from group activities as singer, he has debuted as an actor in the Korean movie, The Love That's Left.

== Early life and education ==
Hongseok was born on April 17, 1994, in Seoul, South Korea. He has an older brother named Jun-seok. He studied abroad in the United States, China, and Singapore and has lived outside of South Korea for a total of 11 years. From 2007 to 2010, he was a student at Hwa Chong International School in Singapore, where he was the school's top swimmer.

== Career ==
=== Pre-debut ===
In 2014, Hongseok joined YG Entertainment and participated in the reality survival program Mix & Match as a member of TEAM B. He was eliminated in final episode alongside Jung Jin-hyeong, failing to debut as a member of iKON. In March 2015, it was revealed that he left YG Entertainment.

In July 2015, he joined Cube Entertainment. In February 2016, he modeled alongside Hyuna for the fashion brand Clride.n.

=== 2016–present: Debut with Pentagon and solo activities ===
In late 2016, he participated in the Mnet reality survival show Pentagon Maker, ultimately making it to the final lineup of Pentagon. He officially debuted with Pentagon on October 10, 2016, with the song "Gorilla" from their self-titled EP.

In November 2017, Hongseok made his acting debut in the movie The Love That's Left.

In July 2018, Hongseok joined the cast of Visiting Tutor, a variety program where celebrities seek out a student and become their tutor. He held Chinese lessons for his student. The show ran from August to October. In September, he was cast in the variety program Real Man 300, which featured celebrities experiencing life in the military. The show ended in late January 2019.

In January 2019, he co-starred in the television drama Best Chicken as Bae Ki-Bum, a likeable troublemaker. In March, he starred in his first web drama On The Campus. In May, Hongseok starred in the Naver V web drama Anniversary Anyway. He was the cover model for the July 2019 issue of Men's Health's Korea. Later that month he was cast in the reality-documentary show Law of the Jungle in Myanmar. In August, he was a contestant on King of Mask Singer, where he performed a cover of Huh Gak's "Hello".

In October 2020, he and bandmate Kino made a cameo in the web drama Twenty-Twenty. He made his second appearance on the cover of Men's Health Korea for the December 2020 issue.

From January to March 2021, Hongseok starred as the supporting character Shin A-jun in the SBS drama Phoenix 2020. He portrayed a police officer in the Netflix series Move to Heaven, released on May 14. Hongseok played the lead in the web series Blue Birthday, which was released in the summer of 2021.

In November 2023, Hongseok terminated his exclusive contract with Cube Entertainment. Later that month, he signed with acting agency Andmarq. On May 17, 2024, Hongseok was featured in Sorn's single, titled "Crazy Stupid Lovers." In September, he starred in the short-form drama Shall We Get Married? for Sereal+.

In March 2026, Hongseok appeared as an idol in the Netflix drama Boyfriend on Demand. He will star in the vertical short-form series K-Younger Man Alert. The series, a Korea-Japan co-produced romance drama, will premiere in late March.

== Personal life ==
Hongseok can speak three languages: Korean, Chinese, and English.

Hongseok is an avid fan of fitness. He regularly posts videos online detailing his workouts and diets in a series called Hongseok is Working Out Hong Hong Hong.

=== Military service ===
On April 1, 2022, the agency announced that Hongseok would be enlisting for his mandatory military service as an active duty soldier on May 3. On December 26, 2022, it was confirmed by the agency that Hongseok would be discharged from military service early and assigned wartime labor service due to depression and panic disorder with public phobia.

== Philanthropy ==
Hongseok participated in the world's biggest Ice Bucket Challenge, 2019 Miracle365 x Ice Bucket Challenge Run on June 29, 2019, in Dongjak District, Seoul. The event was organized by Seungil Hope Foundation to raise awareness about ALS. The event raised 42 million won, and all proceeds went to build the first Lou Gehrig's Nursing Hospital in South Korea. The event started with a 3 km, 5 km, 7 km and 8 km group marathon with 1,130 participants who broke a total of 918 challenges the previous year.

== Discography ==
=== Writing and production credits ===
All credits are adapted from the Korea Music Copyright Association, unless stated otherwise.

Year	Artist	Song	Album	Lyrics		Music	
Year	Artist	Song	Album	Credited	With	Credited	With
2016	Pentagon	"Find Me" (나를 찾아줘)	Non-album release	No	–	Yes	Jinho, E'Dawn, Park Jae Sun, Tiger JK
2019	Pentagon	"Round 1" (Bonus track)	Genie:us	Yes	Hui, Jinho, Shinwon, Yeo One, Yan An, Yuto, Kino, Wooseok	Yes	Hui, Jinho, Shinwon, Yeo One, Yan An, Yuto, Kino, Wooseok, MosPick
2019	Pentagon	"Round 2" (Bonus track)	Sum(me:r)	Yes	Hui, Jinho, Shinwon, Yeo One, Yan An, Yuto, Kino, Wooseok	Yes	Hui, Jinho, Shinwon, Yeo One, Yan An, Yuto, Kino, Wooseok, MosPick

== Filmography ==
=== Film ===
Year	Title	Role	Notes	Ref.
2017	The Love That's Left	Kim Woo-joo		
2022	Blue Birthday	Ji Seo-jun	New edited version and add never-before-seen scenes	

=== Television series ===
Year	Title	Role	Ref.
2019	Best Chicken	Bae Ki-Bum	
2021	Phoenix 2020	Shin Ah-jun	
2021	Move to Heaven	Park Jun-yeong	
2026	Boyfriend on Demand	Idol	

=== Web series ===
Year	Title	Role	Notes	Ref.
2019	On The Campus	Hee-yeol		
2019	Anniversary Anyway	Hong Woo-jae		
2020	Twenty-Twenty	Crew 2	Cameo	
2021	Blue Birthday	Ji Seo-jun		
2021	Shadow Beauty	Lee Jin-seong		
2024	Shall We Get Married?	Yoon Hyun-soo		
2026	K-Younger Man Alert	Min-woo		
TBA	Aquaman	Ji Seong-joon		

=== Television shows ===
Year	Title	Role	Notes	Ref.
2014	Mix and Match	Eliminated		
2016	Pentagon Maker	Contestant		
2017	Tour Avatar	Cast	Episode 5–6 with Jinho	
2017	Weekly Idol	Masked Idol	ep 297, 305, 307, 310, 321	
2017	Idol Tour	Participant	Episode 6 with Hui	
2017	Fantastic Duo	Panelist	ep 29–30	
2018	Hitman	Participant	Filmed in Vietnam	
2018	Just Happened	Panelist		
2018	Visiting Tutor	Cast Member	Mandarin language	
2018	Real Man 300	Cast Member	Filmed in the Korea Army Academy	
2019	Battle Trip	Contestant	ep 143–144	
2019	Law of the Jungle in Myanmar	Cast Member		
2019	King of Mask Singer	Contestant (Daengchiri)	ep 217	
2020	Idol Cooking Class	Cast	with Hui, Shinwon and Kino	

=== Hosting ===
Year	Title	Role	Notes	Ref.
2018	Simply K-pop	Special MC	from 26 February–10 May	

== Awards and nominations ==
Name of the award ceremony, year presented, category, nominee of the award, and the result of the nomination
Award ceremony	Year	Category	Nominee / Work	Result	Ref.
Korea First Brand Awards	2019	Male Variety Idol of the Year	Hongseok	Nominated	
Brand of the Year	2021	Male Idol Actor of the Year	Hongseok	Nominated	
Blue Dragon Series Awards	2022	Best New Actor	Hongseok	Nominated	
