= U & Cube Festival 2019 in Japan =

Music festival in Tokyo, Japan

- Concert by United Cube
- Venue: Musashino Forest Sport Plaza, Tokyo
- Associated album: Various
- Date: March 23, 2019
- Duration: 3 hours 30 minutes
- Attendance: 6,000
- Website: http://uandcubefestival.jp/

United Cube concert chronology
- United Cube Concert – One (2018); U & Cube Festival 2019 in Japan (2019)

U & Cube Festival 2019 in Japan is the first joint concert of 'U-Cube' that was established in November 2018 by Cube Entertainment and the Japanese subsidiary of Universal Music Japan. The concert takes place at Musashino Forest Sport Plaza in Tokyo. The event is scheduled nine months after United Cube Concert – One concert held at KINTEX. The concert was attended by 6,000 fans.

== Background ==
U & Cube Festival 2019 in Japan marks the agency's first family concert in six years since the "United Cube Concert 2013" in Yokohama in 2013.

== Artist ==
- Lee Hwi-jae (Note: Act as the MC for the concert.)
- BtoB (Note: Seo Eun-kwang, Lee Min-hyuk and Lee Chang-sub was absent due to their military service.)
- CLC
- Pentagon
- Lai Kuan-lin
- Yoo Seon-ho
- (G)I-dle
- A Train To Autumn
- Wooseok x Kuanlin

== Set list ==
This set list is representative of the show on March 23, 2019.

VCR

1. Young & One (All Cube United)
2. That Season You Were In (A Train To Autumn)
3. Farewell Again (A Train To Autumn)
4. Hann (Alone) ((G)I-dle)
5. Latata ((G)I-dle)
6. Give Me Your ((G)I-dle)
7. Senorita ((G)I-dle)
8. Maybe Spring (Yoo Seon-ho)
9. Lemon (Kenshi Yonezu cover) (Seonho duet Jinho)
10. I'm A Star (Wooseok x Kuanlin)
11. Hypey (Lai Kuan-lin)
12. Black Dress (CLC)
13. No Oh Oh (Japanese ver.) (CLC)
14. Show (CLC)
15. No (CLC)
16. Gorilla (Japanese ver.) (Pentagon)
17. Cosmo (Pentagon)
18. Naughty Boy (Pentagon)
19. Shine (Japanese ver.) (Pentagon)
20. Big Wave (Jung Il-hoon)
21. Swimming (Hyunsik)
22. Follow Your Dreams (21 Cube United vocalists)
23. Mermaid (Lee Min-hyuk, Peniel Shin, Ilhoon, Yeeun, Wooseok, Soyeon)
24. Cube performance team (CLC and (G)I-dle)
25. Beautiful Pain (BtoB)
26. Friend (BtoB)
27. Missing You (BtoB ft. Jinho, Hui and Kuanlin)

Encore

1. Blowin’ Up (BtoB with United Cube)
2. Upgrade (All United Cube)

== Media ==
Air Date	Country	Network	Ref.
May 21 – present	Worldwide	CUBE TV Hangtime app, CUBE TV	

Blu-ray & DVD

- 2019 U-Cube festival Japan Blu-ray & DVD

Film

- September 6 - Aeon Cinema Ebetsu
- September 7 - Aeon Cinema Kohoku New Town
- September 7 - Aeon Cinema Wonder Nagoya
- September 7 - Aeon Cinema Ibaraki Osaka
- September 7 - Aeon Mall Fukuoka
