= Cube TV =

South Korean television channel

- Country: South Korea
- Headquarters: Gayang-dong, Seoul

Programming
- Language: Korean

Ownership
- Owner: iHQ, Cube Entertainment

History
- Launched: July 1, 2015; 11 years ago
- Replaced: The Drama (July 2012 to June 30, 2015)

Links
- Website: https://cubetv.tv/main.php

Cube TV（Hangul: 큐브TV）was established on July 1, 2015, is a channel launched by iHQ's media division and Cube Entertainment, and is in charge of channel operation in iHQ Media Division and contents production and supply at Cube Entertainment. Through the combination of broadcasters and entertainment companies, Cube TV aims to globalize the channels in line with the current of the Korean Wave, which is expanding its market both domestically and globally by producing stable and consistently excellent contents in promoting K-pop culture through variety shows, fansign meetings and online drama.

The channel includes BtoB's Btob Show, CLC's Seongdong-gu Resident, Pentagon's Pentagon maker, Triple H's Triple H Fun Agency, online drama Spark and more.

== Development ==
In 2018, Cube Entertainment joined with Kiswe Mobile to create an application of 12 multi-view camera, "Cube TV Hangtime". This is an interactive mobile video which audience can interact with the artist. On June 16, Cube TV Hangtime app aired a four-hour-long of "United Cube Concert – One" for the audience who were unable to attend the concert.

For Cube TV's 5th anniversary, they held an event of 'Uploading the 5th Anniversary Channel Logo SNS Certification Shot' and announced two original programs scheduled to air in July, (G)I-dle's Never Ending Neverland and All That Cube.

== Programs ==
=== Current airing ===
- Starting today (Variety)
- JOB Dragon 20 (Variety)
- Seonho's Everyday (Variety)
- #Hashtalk (Variety)
- U & Cube Festival 2019 in Japan (Music)
- PRISM LOG (Variety)
- (G)I-dle: Little but Certain Happiness (Variety)
- What Is Hui Wearing Today? (Variety)
- Pentagon's TNL (Thursday Night Live)
- Lovely 95s (Variety)
- Lovely 95s Special (Variety)
- Wassup Showcase (Music)
- CLC Yeeun'S Sweet Radio (Variety)
- CLC in Seongdong-gu (Variety)
- 2018 BtoB Time – This Is Us (Music)
- Doom-CLC, Doodoom-CLC (Variety)
- BtoB's HA.DA.BANG (Variety)
- CLC's Cheat Key (Variety)
- PENTORY (Music)
- CUBE Bang (Variety)
- BtoB: Beatcom (Music)
- (G)I-dle: I-Talk (Variety)
- Pentagon: Just Do It Yo! (Variety)
- If You Stop Now, There Will Be No Spotlight (Variety)
- United Cube Concert – One (Music)
- Level Up (Drama)
- BTOB: Conti-NEW (Variety)
- Pentagon Mini Concert Tentastic Vol.5 - Miracle (Music)
- 2019 Hong Kong Asian Music Festival (Music)
- 2017 BtoB Time – Our Concert (Music)
- Rich Man (Drama)
- Single Wife (Drama)
- B.A.P 오지GO 지리GO (Untact Life) (Variety)
- The Friends in Adriatic Sea (Variety)
- Triple H Fun Agency (Variety)
- Hashtag CUBE (Variety)
- 2017 BtoB Time ((Music)
- Pentagon 1st showcase in Japan (Music)
- 2PM Wild Beat in Australia (Variety)
- 2016 The Beautiful Show (Music)
- Pentagon Mini Concert Tentastic Vol.1 - Love (Music)
- The Miracle ((Drama)
- Tong Memories ((Drama)
- Star News (Variety)
- Something About 1% ((Drama)
- I learn (Variety)
- Gourmet Road (Variety)
- Spark (Drama)
- The Friends In Costa Rica (Variety)
- Reform Show (Variety)
- Hashtag Cube: B2B (Variety)
- 2015 Born to Beat Time (Music)
- BtoB 1st concert: Hello Melody ((Music)
- Nightmare Teacher ((Drama)
- Real Beauty (Variety)
- Audition Truck (Variety)
- Don't Work Music (Variety)
- The Friends in Chiang Mai (Variety)
- The Friends in Switzerland (Variety)
- 2014 BEAST Beautiful Show Behind Story (Variety)
- 4minute's VIDEO (Variety)
- 4minute's VIDEO special (Variety)
- BTOB Debut Showcase ((Music)
- Beast Special-concert highlights ((Music)
- BtoB's Mini Concert ((Music)
- BEAST zepp tour concert ((Music)
- 2014 BEAST Beautiful Show ((Music)
- Yong jun hyung's GOOD LIFE (Variety)
- CLC's Beautiful Mission (Variety)
- The Friends in Croatia (Variety)
- Teen Top's Never stop in Guam (Variety)
- SISTAR's Midnight in Hong Kong (Variety)
- Cutie MV (Variety)
- Behind CUBE (Variety)

=== General programs ===
- Live Power Music Special
- Live Power Music
- B+ Diary
- One cool day in BAP
- Snooper Project
- Gangnam Feel Dance School
- Very private TV
- The cornerstone of global dating 99
- Oh My Girl Cast
- Kiss and the City
- Star Q 10
- Best Chicken
- Cash Taxi Season 1
- The era of Fortress Exploration
- Tae Jae-hoon's Style
- Leave when you send! Between men!
- The Stage Big Pleasure Season 6
- The Stage Big Pleasure Season 7
- Idol Dance Competition D-style
- Half Moon
- I'm Kim So Jung Season 2 - Let's Go Hainan
- Weekly Idol
- Hyung-don and Dae-joon's Hitmaker
- Girl Spirit
- Hello IBI
- Infinite's Showtime
- Plan V Diary
- B1A4's One Fine Day
- When I Left
- Idol School
- Channel Fiesta
- Slimmy Lunch Box
- One fine day of Ailee&Amber
- Webtoon Hero Tundra Show Season 1
- Apink's Showtime
- Take 511
- Swedish Laundry
- A Week of Romance
- Immortal Songs: Singing the Legend
- Happy Together Season 3
- Battle Trip
- Let's Go! Dream Team Season 2
- Music Bank
- Music Bank World Tour
- Sistar's Showtime
- VIXX's One Fine Day
- Girl's Day - One Fine Day
- EXID's Showtime
- Heavenly Life Return
- Imaginary Cat (Drama)
- I Am Dating Alone (Variety)
- HARA ON&OFF: The Gossip
- AOA's One Fine Day
- Exo's Showtime
- Dodohara (Drama)
- Mash Up
- Rookie King: Channel Bangtan
- Fashion King Korea
- Coming Out FTIsland
- SONAMOO's Pet House
- I Order You (Drama)
- Lovelyz in Wonderland
- Star Show 360
- The Track
- Pentagon Maker
- Falling Skies (season 5) (Drama)
- MV Bank Stardust 2
- I Got7
- Lee Jung-ui's My Baby
- Hyuna's Free Month
- BtoB's Cool Men
