= United Cube Concert – One =

2018 concert by Cube Entertainment

- Concert by United Cube
- Promotional Image
- Venue: Korea International Exhibition Center
- Associated album: Various
- Date: June 16, 2018
- Duration: 4 hours 30 minutes
- Attendance: 8,500

United Cube concert chronology
- I Want Cube Pop in Macau (2016); United Cube Concert – One (2018); U & Cube Festival 2019 in Japan (2019)

United Cube Concert – One (Korean: 유나이티드 큐브 원) was the second domestic concert of South Korean music label Cube Entertainment in 2018. The concert takes place at KINTEX in Seoul with an audience of 8,500 people.

== Summary ==
Promotional Image

On May 4, 2018, Cube Entertainment announced through its official SNS that it will hold a family concert titled United Cube -ONE-. The event took place at KINTEX, Ilsan on June 16. The concert marks the agency's first family concert in five years since United Cube – Cube Party in 2013. Ticket went on sale online started on May 9, 2018, at 8 PM and was sold out in two minutes.

On June 14, Cube Entertainment revealed that Jo Kwon, BTOB’s Eunkwang and Im Hyun-sik, CLC’s Sorn and Seunghee, Pentagon's Hui and Jinho, and (G)I-DLE’s Miyeon and Minnie prepared a special stage at Mnet’s M Countdown and KBS2’s Music Bank under the name 'United Cube' where they perform a song called 'One Step'. The song was composed and written by Hyunsik about hope and comfort with a message that no matter how tired and worn out you are, as long as you keep taking one step forward towards your dream, you will reach it one day.

On the day of the concert, a press conference was held to commemorate the opening of '2018 UNITED CUBE -ONE-' at 2nd KINTEX Exhibition Center. CUBE TV Hangtime app aired the concert for the audience who were unable to attend the concert. Twenty live video feeds from the concert and from backstage were used to produce twelve live streams.

The concert last a total of four hours which featured performances by a total of thirty-three Cube artists including HyunA, Jo Kwon, BTOB, CLC, Pentagon, (G)I-DLE and Yoo Seon-ho. Triple H gave a sneak preview of their new song Retro Future ahead of their comeback. Lai Guan-lin made a surprise appearance on stage for the encore with his fellow labelmates.

On June 17, Cube released 'Upgrade', 'Mermaid', 'Follow Your Dreams' (한걸음) and 'Young & One' from its family concert "United Cube One" through several music portals, including Melon and iTunes.

== Performers ==
A total of 33 singers participated in the concert.

- Hyuna
- Jo Kwon
- BtoB
- CLC
- Pentagon
- Triple H
- Lai Kuan-lin ^{A}
- Yoo Seon-ho
- (G)I-dle
- Kwon Eunbin

== Set list ==
This set list is representative of the show on June 16, 2018.

Intro & VCR

1. Young & One (All United Cube)
2. Maze ((G)I-dle)
3. Latata ((G)I-dle)
4. Light My Body Up (David Guetta cover) ((G)I-dle feat Yoo Seon-ho)
5. One Blue Star (Seonho)
6. Maybe Spring (Seonho)
7. Hyung (Eunkwang)
8. Don't Worry (My Annoying Brother OST) (Eunkwang and Seonho)
9. I Like It (CLC)
10. Hobgoblin (CLC)
11. MeowMeow (CLC)
12. Black Dress (CLC with Pentagon)
13. Intro (Kino solo dance)
14. Like This (Pentagon)
15. Gorilla (Pentagon)
16. Can You Feel It (Pentagon)
17. Spectacular (Pentagon)
18. Shine (Pentagon with Jokwon)
19. Lonely (Jokwon)
20. Can't Let You Go, Even If I Die (죽어도못보내) (Jokwon)
21. This Song (Jokwon)
22. Follow Your Dreams (24 Cube United vocalists)
23. Movie (BtoB)
24. It's Okay (BtoB)
25. Blowin' Up (BtoB with Pentagon and Seonho)
26. Lip & Hip (Hyuna)
27. Babe (Hyuna)
28. Roll Deep (Hyuna feat. Ilhoon)
29. Dance Performance (Hui, E'Dawn, Yuto, Kino, Seungyeon, Yujin, Eunbin, Soojin and Shuhua)
30. Mermaid (Lee Min-hyuk, Peniel Shin, Ilhoon, Yeeun, Wooseok, Jeon So-yeon)
31. 365Fresh and new song spoiler (Triple H)
32. Animal (Jokwon feat. Soyeon)
33. She's Gone (Ilhoon)
34. Red (Hyuna)
35. How's This? (Hyuna)
36. Change (Hyuna)
37. Bubble Pop! (Hyuna with (G)I-dle)
38. Someday (BtoB)
39. Missing You (BtoB)
40. Our Concert (BtoB)
41. Upgrade (All United Cube)

Encore + Kuanlin VCR

42. Artist Song Medley
43. Shake It (All United Cube)

== Media ==
Air Date	Country	Network	Ref.
June 16, 2018	Japan, Taiwan, Malaysia, Vietnam, Singapore, Indonesia, Thailand, Philippines, Hong Kong, Dubai and United States	CUBE TV Hangtime app	
July 7, 2018–present Every Saturday from 7:00pm	Worldwide	CUBE Tv	

== Notes ==
- ^{^A} Lai Kuan-lin made a surprise visit at the end of the concert.
