= List of Seo Eun-kwang performances =

Seo Eun-kwang filmography
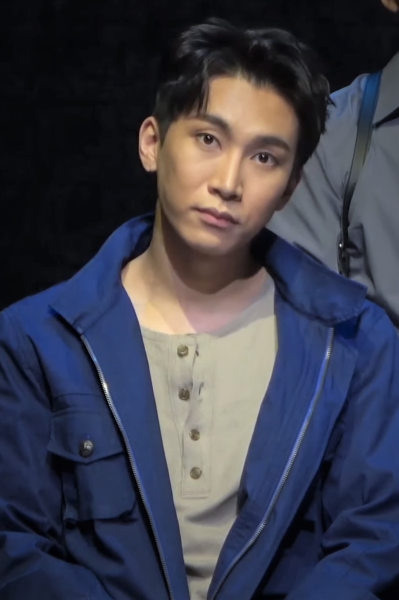
- Seo during Gwangju musical press conference in 2020.
- Television series: 2
- Television show: 22
- Web show: 5
- Radio show: 1
- Hosting: 4
- Theatre: 10

Seo Eun-kwang (Korean: 서은광; born November 22, 1990), is a South Korean singer, songwriter, entertainer, musical actor, and a member of the K-pop boy band BtoB, currently signed to Cube Entertainment.

== Television series ==
Year	Title	Role	Notes	Ref.
2012	I Live in Cheongdam-dong		Pre-debut with other BtoB members	
2014	The Heirs	Himself	Cameo ep. 4	

== Television shows ==
Key
‡	Current programs
†	Works that have not yet been aired

Year	Title	Role	Notes	Ref.
2014	Saturday Night Live Korea 5	Cast member	Episode 1–10	
2015	We Got Married	Studio panelist	Season 4	
2015	National Singing Competition	Contestant	Appeared as Silver Axe with Lee Chang-sub	
2016	Idol and Family National Singing Competition	Contestant	KBS Lunar New Year special with his brother, Seo Eun-chong and bandmate Lee Chang-sub	
2016	King of Mask Singer	Contestant	Appeared as "Tonight I'm Afraid of Darkness, Seokbong", episodes 75–76	
2016	Duet Song Festival	Contestant	Paired with Kim Yeon-mi, episodes 23–24	
2016	Battle Trip	Contestant	With Yook Sung-jae, Im Hyun-sik, episode 16	
2016-17	Lipstick Prince	Panelist		
2017	Battle Trip	Contestant	With Lee Min-hyuk, Lee Chang-sub, episode 62	
2017	Immortal Songs: Singing the Legend	Contestant	Chuseok Special with Family with his mother Hwang Soon-ok, episode 324	
2017	Master Key	Contestant	Episode 5, 7 and 11	
2017	Immortal Songs: Singing the Legend	Contestant	Best of the Best episode 335	
2018	Law of the Jungle in Mexico	Cast member	Episode 314–324	
2018	Unexpected Q	Contestant	Episode 1, 15	
2018	Real Life Men and Women	Cast member	Season 2	
2020	Bookae Contest (부캐 선발대회)	Contestant	Appeared as Silver Axe with Lee Chang-sub	
2021	We Became a Family	Cast member	Appeared as the second uncle from the Kangchun Family	
2021	Global Donation Show W	Participant	Christmas Special episode	
2021	Immortal Songs: Singing the Legend	Contestant	Gummy Special, episode 517	
2022	The Second World	Judge		
2022	Immortal Songs: Singing the Legend	Contestant	Winner with Kim Ki-tae on Episode 561 (Baek Ji-young Special) and Episode 587 (2022 King of Kings Special Part 2)	
2023–2024	Weekly Idol	Host		
2023	Super Karaoke Survival: VS	Producer	with Jang Wooyoung	
2024	Build Up: Vocal Boy Group Survival †	Judge		
2025	The Gentlemen's League 4	Cast member		

== Web shows ==
Key
‡	Current programs
†	Works that have not yet been aired

Year	Title	Role	Notes	Ref.
2021	Steve JOBson (스티브 JOB손)	Judge/director	With Lee Min-hyuk, Park Mi-sun	
2022	My Playlist	Host	with Yang Yo-seob	
2022	TikTok Stage ON Air	Host	with Im Hyun-sik	
2022	The Door: To Wonderland	Cast Member	Season 1–2	
2022	Inssa Oppa G	Host	with Lee Chang-sub	
2023	Promotion King ‡	Host		

== Musicals ==
Year	Title	Role	Ref.
2013	The Count of Monte Cristo	Albert	
2013	Bachelor's Vegetable Store	Chul Jin-yeok	
2017	Hamlet	Hamlet	
2017	Goddess is Watching You	Ryu Sunho	
2018	Three Musketeers	D'Artagnan	
2018	Barnum: The Great Showman	Amos Scudder	
2020	Something Rotten!	Nick Bottom	
2020	Gwangju	Park Han-soo	
2021	Xcalibur	King Arthur	
2022–2023	Jesus Christ Superstar	Judas	

== Hosting ==
Year	Title	Notes	Ref.
2020	CLC Single [HELICOPTER] Online Fan Showcase		
2020	All That Cube	Episodes 1, 3, 4 and 6	
2020	Idol League (Season 3)	with Sandara Park	
2021	Lightsum Debut Single [Vanilla] ONLINE FAN SHOWCASE		

== Radio show ==
Year	Title	Notes	Ref.
2018	Idol Radio	DJ; July 7–27, 2018	
