= All That Cube =

- Also known as: Cube Communication
- Hangul: 큐브 통신
- RR: Kyubeu tongsin
- MR: K'yubŭ t'ongsin
- Genre: Entertainment, Music
- Created by: iHQ, Cube
- Developed by: iHQ Media Division
- Presented by: Lee Chang-sub
- Starring: United Cube
- Country of origin: South Korea
- Original language: Korean
- No. of episodes: 16

Production
- Production locations: Gangseo District, Seoul, South Korea
- Camera setup: Multi-camera
- Running time: 30 minutes
- Production companies: Cube, KVLY

Original release
- Network: Cube TV
- Release: July 23 – November 12, 2020

All The Cube (Korean: 큐브 통신), also known as Cube Communication, was a South Korean talk show which first ran on July 23, 2020. The program delivers weekly news of Cube Entertainment's artist.

== Background ==
It is a program launched by Cube TV on their 5th anniversary, and artists from Cube such as BtoB, CLC, Pentagon, Yoo Seon-ho and (G)I-dle, and several entertainers, including Lee Hwi-jae, Heo Kyung-hwan, and Park Mi-sun appear as MC and guests. The program delivers from the official news of Cube Entertainment to the extremely private status of artists and interviews. It is a comprehensive information show where fans can discover the hidden charms of each artist and get curious information through photos and videos that cross information and disclosure.

== Slogan ==
- Opening: 'Wi-Fi ON'
- Ending: 'Wi-Fi OFF'

== Airtime ==
Air date	Airtime	Re-run
July 23 – November 12, 2020	Thursday at 4:30 pm KST	Sunday at 9 pm KST (Episodes 1-11)
July 23 – November 12, 2020	Thursday at 4:30 pm KST	Wednesday 9 pm KST (Episodes 12-16)

== Segments ==
- Fan Sol News - This segment where the MCs deliver the latest news, including comeback, enlistment, casting, etc.
  - First Private News - This is a segment where they addressed private information from the public or staff about the idol groups or individual members. Some idols were invited as a guest to discuss their comments.
- Didn't Ask, Don't Care, CUBE & A Talk - This segment has the slogan "Nobody Asked It, Nobody is Curious About It, But to the Fans, It's A Perfect Feast of Baits". The guest will have to answer fans' questions sent through an online form.
  - Warming-up game - To warm up the guest before Cube & A Talk, several games were played.
    1. Balance game - It is a game where the guest is given two options to answer them fast. The loser will get hit by a toy hammer.
    2. A Blank - This is a game rule where no foreign words are allowed.
    3. Threefold Choice Parody game - It is a game where players have to choose a card from 3 different game cards and play the game behind it. Whoever wins twice out of three games will be the winner.
    4. Parody game - It is a Guess the Picture game. The players were given two questions per game; Guess Whose Eyes, Nose & Mouth, Guess the Super Closeup Food Picture or Guess the Title of the Song. Whoever gets three points fast is the winner.
    5. Consonant game - It is a game where the players have to match a Korean word with an initial consonant. The players were given two consonants and answered them with three words.
    6. Cleopatra game - It is a game where players have to sing or scream the phrase "안녕, 클레오파트라. 세상에서 제일 가는 포테이토 칩" (Hi, Cleopatra. The best potato chip in the world) in a lower key than the person before you. (Note: The actual Cleopatra game plays in a higher key.)
    7. Jumbled Faces - It is a game where the players have to guess two celebrities from a jumbled picture.
    8. 2 Syllables - It is a game where the players have to guess the two syllables out of 4 syllable words.
    9. Drawing a Picture with One Heart - It is a game where three players are given the word, and one player will answer; the three players will draw pictures partially in a given time, and the last player will answer only by looking at the picture.
  - Hidden Card - This segment is where MCs can choose one question about the guest. The name of the segment is changed according to the MC, Seo Eun-kwang is Hidden Card Kwang, Heo Kyung-hwan is Hidden Card Heo, and Lee Chang-sub is Hidden Card Chap.
- Closing Song - This is a segment where the winner recommends a hidden song by a Cube artist and plays it during closing credits.

== Casts ==
=== MC ===
Name	Group	List of Episodes
Eunkwang	BtoB	1, 3, 4, 6, 11, 12
Heo Kyung-hwan	—N/a	2
Kino	Pentagon	5
Yoo Seon-ho	—N/a	5, 16
Changsub	BtoB	7–16
Minhyuk	BtoB	11, 12
Peniel	BtoB	11, 12

== Episodes ==
Note: The episodes aired every Thursday, 9pm KST, real-time broadcast on CUBE TV.
Note 2: Every episode is re-upload with English subtitles on United CUBE (CUBE Entertainment) YouTube official channel.
Note 3: For episodes 12-16, the episode is uploaded into 3 parts: Official News, Didn't Ask, Don't Care, CUBE & A Talk and Closing Song. (Excluding Fan Sol News and First Private News)

Ep.	Air date	Episode Title	MC	Guests	Closing song	Remark(s)
1	July 23, 2020	A bookworm Kino, was it just a made-up image?! (독서왕 키노, 사실은 꾸며진 이미지였다?!)	Eunkwang (BtoB)	Hui, Kino, Wooseok (Pentagon)	Yoo Seon-ho - "Maybe Spring"	Wooseok's leg length and sound level are 116 cm and 131.2 dB; Hui's sound level is 124 dB; Kino's sound level is 128 dB
2	July 30, 2020	(G)I-dle Miyeon, What's the angle of her nose? ((여자)아이들 미연, 코의 각도는 과연?!)	Heo Kyung-hwan	Miyeon, Soojin, Soyeon ((G)I-dle)	(G)I-dle - "I'm the Trend"	Miyeon's nose angle is 40 degree
3	August 6, 2020	Seo Eunkwang×Moon Suin×Yoo Seonho, exploded with their talents! (서은광x문수인x유선호, 끼 폭발!)	Eunkwang (BtoB)	Yoo Seon-ho, Moon Su-inn	BtoB - "Missing You"	
4	August 13, 2020	Seo Eunkwang×Seunghee×Sorn×Yeeun, CLC with Gifted sense of humor! (서은광x승희xSORNx예은, CLC 신이 내린 예능감!)	Eunkwang (BtoB)	Seunghee, Sorn, Yeeun (CLC)	CLC - "Summer Kiss"	Recorded on July 31, 2020; Seunghee's sound level is 131.6 dB
5	August 20, 2020	Excitement in another world, Pentagon×Yoo Seonho! A show to raise the corners of your mouth begins now~! (저세상 텐션, 펜타곤x유선호! 본격 광대 폭발 방송, 시~작!)	Kino (Pentagon), Yoo Seon-ho	Hongseok, Shinwon, Yuto (Pentagon)	Wooseok - Domino	Recorded on August 7, 2020
6	August 27, 2020	Jo Kwon×Seungyeon of CLC, Dance of Gods from alpha to omega, Hot talk time! (조권xCLC장승연, 댄스 최강자들의 춤으로 시작해서 춤으로 끝난, 핫~한 토크 타임!)	Eunkwang (BtoB)	Jo Kwon, Seungyeon (CLC)	(G)I-dle - "Dumdi Dumdi"	Eunkwang's last episode as the MC; Recorded on August 14, 2020
7	September 3, 2020	CLC Comeback! Changsub Comeback! Comeback Special (씨엘씨 컴백! 이창섭 컴백! 오늘은 컴백 특집이다)	Changsub (BtoB)	Yujin, Elkie, Eunbin (CLC)	CLC - "Helicopter"	Changsub's first episode as the MC and first activity after his military discharge.; Recorded on August 21, 2020; Changsub's sound level is 132.4 dB; Yujin's sound level is 126 dB; Eunbin's sound level is 125.6 dB; Elkie's sound level is 132.3 dB
8	September 10, 2020	(G)I-dle foreigners Excitement Soaring up to the sky, turning the world upside down! ((여자)아이들 외국인즈 텐션이 하늘 찔러 지구 뿌셔!)	Changsub (BtoB)	Minnie, Yuqi, Shuhua ((G)I-dle)	(G)I-dle - "Blow Your Mind"	Recorded on August 28, 2020; Minnie's sound level is 131.6 dB; Shuhua's sound level is 131.6 dB; Yuqi's sound level is 132.5 dB
9	September 17, 2020	Cube new combination, ever heard of Na Inwoo, Hongseok, Yeo One? (큐브 NEW 조합 '나인우x홍석x여원'은 처음이지?)	Changsub (BtoB)	Na In-woo, Pentagon (Hongseok, Yeo One)	Pentagon - "Dr.Bebe"	In-woo's grip power is 45.3 kg; Yeo One's grip power is 48.3 kg; Hongseok's grip power is 64.7 kg
10	September 24, 2020	A killing laughter party of variety genius Lee Sangjoon and variety newbie Moon Suinn! (예능 대세와 예능 병아리의 배꼽 대잔치)	Changsub (BtoB)	Lee Sang-joon, Moon Su-inn	Changsub - "At The End"	Sangjun's leg length - 97 cm, shoulder width - 51 cm; Suinn's leg length - 109 cm, shoulder width - 50 cm; Changsub's leg length - 101 cm
11	October 8, 2020	4 members of BtoB, at last they are back! (비투비 4인방, 드디어 그들이 왔다!)	Eunkwang, Minhyuk, Changsub, Peniel (BtoB) (Note: On episode 11, the guest was the MC. They were given each a hidden card and every segment, the MC was changed.)		BtoB - "Finale: Our Concert"	Recorded on September 18, 2020; Minhyuk's first activity after his military discharge.; Changsub's grip power is 43.8 kg; Eunkwang's grip power is 48.5 kg; Peniel's grip power is 50.7 kg; Minhyuk's grip power is 56.6 kg
12	October 15, 2020	Finally! Second EP. with BtoB on AllThatCube! Melody gather around! (드디어! 큐브통신 비투비 두 번 째 편! 멜로디 다 모여랏!)	Eunkwang, Minhyuk, Changsub, Peniel (BtoB)		Pentagon - "Daisy"	Eunkwang's sound level is 130.8 dB; Minhyuk's sound level is 131.9 dB; Peniel's sound level is 131 dB
13	October 22, 2020		Changsub (BtoB)	Yujin, Seungyeon, Seunghee (CLC)	BtoB - "Missing You"	Recorded on September 25, 2020
14	October 29, 2020		Changsub (BtoB)	Yan An, Yuto, Wooseok (Pentagon)	Pentagon - "Beautiful Goodbye"	Recorded on October 7, 2020
15	November 4, 2020		Changsub (BtoB)	Minhyuk (BtoB), Na In-woo	Minhyuk - "Tonight (With Melody)"	Recorded on October 23, 2020
16	November 12, 2020	Last Ep. Special! Compilation clips for CubeFans.zip (마지막 회 스페셜! 큡덕이라면 꼭 봐야할 영상 모음.zip)	Changsub (BtoB), Yoo Seon-ho		– (Note: Good bye speech from Cube artist.)	Recorded on October 23, 2020; Legend Figure Awards; Honorary Grip Power King, Hongseok; Honorary Decibel King, Wooseok
