= 9801 =

Extended play by Wooseok x Kuanlin

EP by Wooseok x Kuanlin
- Released: March 11, 2019
- Recorded: 2019
- Genre: K-pop; hip hop
- Language: Korean
- Label: Cube
- Producer: Peejay; Taeo; Jackson Wang; Boytoy; Youngsky; Wooseok; Kino; Nathan; Flow Blow; Mospick

Singles from 9801
- 1. "I'm A Star" Released: March 11, 2019

9801 is the debut and only extended play by South Korean duo Wooseok x Kuanlin. Wooseok is a member of Pentagon, while Kuanlin is a former member of Wanna One. Released on March 11, 2019, the album marks the first official collaboration between the two artists. The album contains five tracks including the lead single, "I'm A Star".

== Background and release ==
On February 22, 2019, Cube Entertainment announced via SNS that Lai Kuan-lin and Pentagon's Wooseok will be in a unit called Wooseok x Kuanlin. The name of the album is a combination of Wooseok's birth year 1998 and Kuanlin's birth year 2001.

On March 2, 2019, the tracklist was revealed. Two days later, individual and group photos were released.

== Musicality ==
9801 gives a glimpse into the members' style and future musical path. The EP symbolizes challenge and the dreams of the youth, which reflects how "the two members came out of their comfort zone and challenged the new". The album contains five songs, including one track performed by both members and two solo songs each. Both Wooseok and Kuanlin participated in writing.

=== Songs ===
"I'm a Star" (별짓) is witty hip-hop R&B that chronicles the members as young celebrities in show business. Co-written by Wooseok and Kuanlin, the track focuses on their experiences and hardships, and how they are proud of their achievements and hopeful for their future. In particular, wordplay on the Korean word "별" (meaning "star") is used wittily throughout the track.

“Hypey”, rapped primarily in English, is Kuanlin’s first solo song on the EP. The hip-hop song is featuring, co-written, and co-produced by Jackson Wang of Got7, alongside producers Boytoy and Youngsky. The two rap powerful and fast lyrics, portraying their confidence over a strong trap beat.

"Always Difficult Always Beautiful" is Wooseok's first solo track, written and produced by Pentagon bandmate Kino, Wooseok, and producer Nathan. Inspired by the “San Junipero” episode of the British anthology series Black Mirror, the song is a hopeful message to those who are tired of living their life: “a beautiful moment is just around the corner, stay strong.”

"Good Feeling", produced by Flow Bow who previously produced Wanna One's "Energetic", is Kuanlin's second solo track. Sung in both English and Korean, the psychedelic trap song conveys Kuanlin's experiences as both a successful performer and an ordinary individual. The experimental track also shows his determination to grow as a person and an artist, with the "hopes to build a much brighter future."

In the self-written solo track "Domino", Wooseok compares his life to domino tiles that repeatedly fall but get back up. The use of rough beats, Wooseok's strong voice, and guitar strums makes the song emotional and sincere.

== Track listing ==
No.	Title	Lyrics	Music	Arrangement	Length
1.	"I'm a Star" (별짓)	Peejay; Taeo; Wooseok; Lai Kuanlin	Peejay; Taeo	Peejay; Taeo	3:11
2.	"Hypey" (Kuanlin ft. Jackson Wang)	Jackson Wang; Boytoy; Youngsky	Jackson Wang; Boytoy; Youngsky	Jackson Wang; Boytoy	2:36
3.	"Always Difficult Always Beautiful" (Wooseok solo)	Wooseok; Kino	Wooseok; Kino; Nathan	Nathan	3:49
4.	"Good Feeling" (Kuanlin solo)	illinit	Flow Blow	Flow Blow	2:52
5.	"Domino" (Wooseok solo)	Wooseok	Mospick; Wooseok	Mospick	3:13
Total length:					15:41

== Charts ==
Chart (2019)	Peak position
South Korean Albums (Gaon)	2

== Release history ==
Region	Date	Format	Distributor
Various	March 11, 2019	CD, digital download, streaming	Cube Entertainment; Kakao M
South Korea	March 11, 2019	CD, digital download, streaming	Cube Entertainment; Kakao M
South Korea	March 11, 2019	Digital download, streaming	Cube Entertainment; Kakao M
