= Never Ending Neverland =

2020 television series starring (G)I-dle

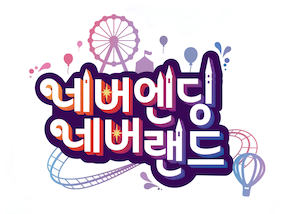
- Promotional logo
- Hangul: 네버엔딩 네버랜드
- RR: Nebeoending Nebeoraendeu
- MR: Nebŏending Nebŏraendŭ
- Genre: Reality
- Created by: iHQ, Cube
- Developed by: iHQ Media Division
- Starring: (G)I-dle
- Country of origin: South Korea
- Original language: Korean
- No. of episodes: 5 (list of episodes)

Production
- Production location: South Korea
- Camera setup: Multi-camera
- Running time: Tuesday at 16:30 (KST)
- Production companies: Cube, KVLY

Original release
- Network: Cube TV
- Release: July 21 – August 18, 2020

Never Ending Neverland (Korean: 네버엔딩 네버랜드) is a South Korean reality show starring Cube Entertainment's third girl group (G)I-dle on their journey to rescue Neverland from Captain Hook's curses.

== Background and concept ==
On July 1, 2020, Cube TV announced that it will launch an entertainment program, Never Ending Neverland as part of their 5th anniversary. The show follows the storyline of Peter Pan with a curse placed on the fantasy nation of Neverland by Captain Hook, where (G)I-dle will follow various missions in the story. The group will showcase their various skills through challengers including impression, fashion styling and cooking.

== Contents ==
A Never Book helps (G)I-dle to solve Captain Hook's curses. After every mission they receive a card to open the eternity gate to Neverland.

=== Captain Hook's 6 Curses ===
- Curse 1 - A Phonograph that lost melodies
- Curse 2 - The lamp that lost light
- Curse 3 - Little Prince who lost his crown
- Curse 4 - A clown who lost his ball
- Curse 5 - A knight who lost his sword
- Curse 6 - A fountain that lost water

=== Mission Rooms ===
- Mission 1 - Movie
- Mission 2 - Training/styling room
- Mission 3 - Camping site
- Mission 4 - Sleep room
- Mission 5 - Courage room
- Mission 6 - Singing room

=== Rules ===
- Pizza Timing game - In episode 2, each member chooses one hidden ingredient and make pizza by using all 6 selected ingredients
- Miyeon's kimchi fried rice - In episode 2, Miyeon have to cook kimchi fried rice in 15 minutes depending on the members' orders.
- 4-letter Word Game - In episode 3, each member have to complete the 4 letter words within 40 seconds.
- Candlelight - In episode 3, the challenger used a water gun to put out the candlelight while in swing motion. They were given 3 chances.
- SNS LIVE Singing - In episode 4, the fans were given 5 songs to vote for the song they want (G)I-dle to sing. They will sing 3 songs the fans choose and score 290 points.
- Cosmetic CF Game - In episode 5, each member chooses one cosmetic product to advertise on a non-commercial film. The winner get to choose which bed to sleep and assigned members' bed.

=== Clues ===
- Mission 1 - You can see by closing the left eye.
- Mission 2 - Check the inner heart of the giant.
- Mission 3 - Clear the green beard away.
- Mission 4 - The foot of the lamp is dark.
- Mission 5 - If you want to get a star, look up in the sky.
- Mission 6 - The card was given.

== Cast ==
=== Members ===
- Miyeon as herself
- Minnie as herself
- Soojin as herself
- Soyeon as herself
- Yuqi as herself
- Shuhua as herself

=== Guest ===
- Kim Bo-min as the narrator (Episode 1)
- Jeon A-ram, an aerial silk instructor (Episode 3)
- Hyemin, a Beauty Wanghong's media influencer in China (Episode 5)

== Episodes ==
- Note: The episodes aired live on Cube TV at 4:30 pm KST.
- Note 2: Every episode is re-uploaded into two parts with English subtitles on (G)I-dle's official Youtube channel at 5pm KST on the same day.
- Note 3: Exclusive behind the scenes footage only on Cube TV. The behind-the-scenes will not be uploaded on the group's Youtube channel.

Ep.	Air date	Mission(s)	Remark(s)	Member/Card	Ref.
1	July 21, 2020	The Beginning of an Adventure To Neverland	Optained Never Book Neverland Story		
1	July 21, 2020	Learn vocal mimicry and disturb Hook	Narrator: Kim Bo-min (voice actress); Special lecture on characters and vocal mimicry; Voice impression party; Reenacted scenes from The World of the Married and Temptation of Wife; Best actress – Shuhua	Shuhua – Dance of a White Butterfly	
2	July 28, 2020	Disguise as other members to trick Hook; Reached 50,000 likes within 10 mins on Instagram	Teams in 2 - Yuqi and Soyeon; Shuhua and Soojin; Miyeon and Minnie; Disguise in a staycation concept; Photographer – Yuqi	Yuqi – The Sun in the Bluish Sky	
2	July 28, 2020	Make pizza for dinner; Make 3 staff members laugh to remove an ingredient; Miyeon's kimchi fried rice	Ingredients selected; 1. Basil leaves - Shuhua; 2. Chicken - Yuqi; 3. Jelly worms - Miyeon; 4. Cucumber - Soyeon; 5. Onion and paprika - Minnie; 6. Meat - Soojin; Chef – Miyeon	Miyeon – Crown of the Green Alligator	
3	August 4, 2020	Wake-up mission	4-letter Word Game; DJ – Minnie	Minnie – A Pink Mouse Ball	
3	August 4, 2020	Aerial Silk mission; Learn poses and fly in the sky; Candlelight mission	Aerial silk instructor: Jeon A-ram; Aerial silk one point lesson; Sniper – Soojin	Soojin – Red Fox's Sword	
4	August 11, 2020	SNS Live Singing	Songs they sang: (G)I-dle – "Uh-Oh"; CLC – "No"; 4Minute – "What's Your Name?"; (G)I-dle – "Oh My God"; Captain – Soyeon	Soyeon – Yellow Fish's House	
4	August 11, 2020		(G)I-dle and Neverland never-ending story; Video letters by their fans		
5	August 18, 2020	Cosmetic CF Game	(G)I-dle's cosmetic CF shooting; Behind the scenes from every episodes		
5	August 18, 2020	Beauty products presentation	Interview with Hyemin; Introduced VT Cosmetics's Super Hyalon products		

== Production Notes ==
Adapted from the closing credits

- Planned by iHQ and Cube TV
- Produced by Cube Entertainment and KVLY
- Sponsored by VT Cosmetics.
