= A Train To Autumn =

South Korean boy band from 2018–2020

- Origin: Seoul, South Korea
- Genre: K-pop
- Years active: 2018–2020
- Label: Cube
- Past members: Hwang Ji-hyun; Kim Soo-bin; Lee Ah-young; Baek Somi
- Website: Official Korean website

A Train to Autumn (Korean: 가을로가는기차; abbreviated as ATTA; Korean: 가기차) was a four-member South Korean ballad group formed by Cube Entertainment in 2018. The group debuted on November 5, 2018 with single "That Season You Were In". Going from November 9, the group performed their song on KBS2's Music Bank.

== History ==
On July 15, 2018, A Train To Autumn released a single titled "A Watercolor of a Rainy Day" which featured a male-female duet. Cube entertainment did not reveal the identities of the singers. On November 2, Cube announced they will officially debut them on November 5 with first single "That Season You Were In" written by Kino of Pentagon. It is the first single of their five-part "farewell" series.

In 2019, the group were officially introduced with the release of "Farewell Again"'s (다시 이별) showcase held at the Ilchi Art Hall on February 25. The song is composed and written by Rocoberry. "Spring Rain" (우산을 쓰고) was released on April 29.

In 2020, The group's profile was removed from the Cube Entertainment website, confirming their disbandment.

== Members ==
The members were mainly selected through blind vocal audition, except Soo-bin. The judges of the audition were led by Park Choong-min, the chairman of Cube Entertainment, professors of Howon University and more.

- Hwang Ji-hyun (황지현) was the leader of the group. She featured in Play Kim's digital single "How Nice Would It Be" (얼마나 좋을까) in July 2018.
- Kim Soo-bin (김수빈) performed Kim Se-jeong's "Flower Road" during her third year of high school. In January 2017, Dingo published the "Flower Road" video, and she was invited to audition to join Cube.
- Lee Ah-young (이아영)
- Baek So-mi (백소미)

== Discography ==
=== Singles ===
Title	Year	Album
"A Watercolor of a Rainy Day" (비 오는 날의 수채화)	2018	Non-album singles
"That Season You Were In" (네가 있던 계절)	2018	Non-album singles
"Farewell Again" (다시 이별)	2019	Non-album singles
"Spring Rain" (우산을 쓰고)	2019	Non-album singles

=== Soundtrack appearances ===
Title	Year	Album	Ref.
"Beautiful Moment" (매일 너에게)	2019	Home for Summer OST Part 15	
"You Are in My Heart" (내 맘속에 그대가)	2019	A Place in the Sun OST Part 9	

== Concert ==
=== Showcase ===
- Farewell Again Comeback Showcase ( 25 February 2019)

=== Concert participation ===
- U & Cube Festival 2019 in Japan (2019)
