= Kino (singer) =

South Korean singer

- 강형구
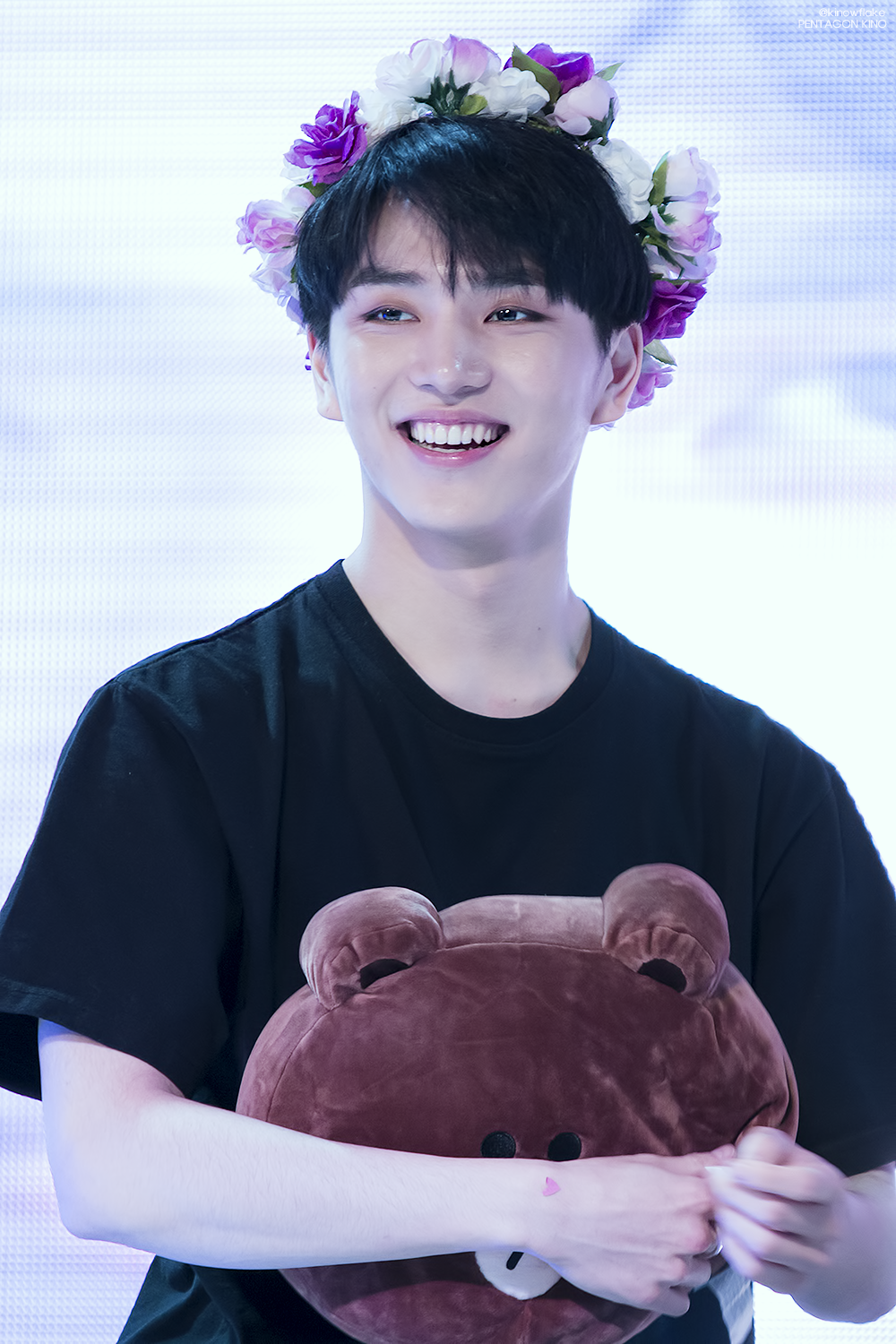
- Kino in December 2017
- Born: Kang Hyung-gu; January 27, 1998 (age 28); Seongnam, South Korea
- Other name: Knnovation
- Occupations: Singer; songwriter; rapper; composer; dancer
- Musical career
- Genres: K-pop; R&B
- Instrument: Vocals
- Years active: 2016–present
- Labels: Cube; Universal Japan; Naked Company
- Member of: Pentagon

Korean name
- Hangul: 강형구
- Hanja: 姜炯求
- RR: Gang Hyeonggu
- MR: Kang Hyŏnggu

Kang Hyung-gu (Korean: 강형구; born January 27, 1998), better known as Kino (키노), is a South Korean singer, songwriter, rapper, composer and dancer. He is best known as a member of the boy group Pentagon, which debuted in 2016 under Cube Entertainment. He releases solo music on SoundCloud under the name Knnovation. He is also a member of the musical collective M.O.L.A.

Kino released his first single album Pose in 2022, before departing Cube Entertainment the following year. In late 2023, he established a one-man agency Naked, where he began continued releasing music leading up to his first EP If This Is Love, I Want a Refund in 2024.

== Name ==
At his group debut showcase, he explained the meaning behind 'Kino'. He said, "My real name is Kang Hyung-gu. I wanted to find a name that could show myself as a singer and in the team in the future, so Kino became it. 키노 is Kino, 'INO' is an acronym for innovation. K is from my original family name, Kang's K, Korea 'K'".

== Personal life ==
Kino was born in Seongnam, South Korea, on January 27, 1998. He has a younger sister. He lived in the Philippines for 3 months when he was a kid. He can speak Korean, Japanese, and English. He graduated from Hanlim School of Performing Arts in 2017 and got admitted into Sejong University as a practical dance major through non-scheduled admission. He is named as the dance master in the group. He's friends with Park Ji-min of 15&, Woodz of UNIQ, Vernon of Seventeen, Nathan, and Hoho. Together they form a project group called M.O.L.A (Make Our Lives Awesome). Kino was a former Power Vocal and JYP Entertainment trainee before joining his current agency, Cube Entertainment. He also regularly uploads demos for other self produced tracks on his SoundCloud, "Knnovation".

== Career ==
=== Pre-debut: Pentagon Maker ===
Before his K-pop debut, he was a member of a dance team called Urban Boyz. He appeared in G.NA's "Secret" music video and promotional activities. He also appeared in Rain's "Rain Effect".

In 2016, he competed in the reality program Pentagon Maker.

=== 2016–2022: Debut with Pentagon and solo activities ===
With the released of "Young", Cube Entertainment confirmed Kino to debut with Pentagon. He helped create the choreography for their debut track, "Gorilla". Kino makes a cameo in the drama Hello, My Twenties! 2 with his bandmates as a member of Asgard.

In 2017, he helped choreograph the Pentagon songs "Like This" for the EP Demo_01 and "Runaway" for Demo_02, with the latter being alongside Jay Black. He also produced the song "Violet" in Demo_02, which has both a Korean and Japanese music video and later became the title track for their second Japanese mini album, Violet.

On July 14, 2018, Kino posted a video of himself doing the "In My Feelings Challenge". Being the first celebrity in South Korea to do the challenge, the clip went viral and the challenge gained popularity in the country. On July 17, he was cast with Gongchan of B1A4 and Yoo Seung-Woo as the MC for Bus King, a program where musicians surprise bus passengers by performing series of songs. M.O.L.A, a musical group consisting of Kino, Park Ji-min of 15&, Woodz of UNIQ, Vernon of Seventeen, and Nathan, released an unofficial song "Chillin" on SoundCloud. In September, he was featured on Park Ji-min's "PUTP" (Pick Up The Phone) alongside M.O.L.A members Woodz and Nathan. The song was released on Jimin's second mini album jiminxjamie. Later that month, he wrote the song "Crossroad" for Jung Dong-ha's first full album of the same name. In November, Kino participated in labelmate A Train To Autumn's debut track "That Season You Were In" and "Bad" by KRIZ featuring Woodz. In late December, he wrote Jisu's debut single "Dear Dawn".

In January 2019, he co-wrote the lyrics for M.FECT's "Designer". On March 11, he contributed in writing and composing "Always Difficult Always Beautiful", for Wooseok on Wooseok x Kuanlin's debut extended play 9801. The song was inspired by the episode "San Junipero" from season three of British anthology series Black Mirror. That same month, Pentagon held the comeback showcase for their eight mini album Genie:us, which contained three songs produced by Kino: "Lost Paradise", "Spring Snow", and "Round 1". Kino participated in all scheduled activities with the exception of performances due to an ankle injury he suffered in January. Pentagon continued promoting with "Spring Snow", and he was able to participate in the promotions for a week. On April 30, he co-wrote, co-produced, and was featured on KRIZ's "1 Sided Love". On September 1, he was featured on KRIZ's track "Hard to Love". He produced "What's Going On With Me?" (이제와 무슨 소용 있겠냐고) by Han Seung-hee, which was released on October 30.

In 2020, Kino debuted as a radio host on the Casper Radio's radio program, Kino's KiSingBooth (키Sing부스). With the release of Pentagon's first studio album Universe: The Black Hall on February 12, Kino co-composed "Die for You" with Nathan. He wrote the song using Harley Quinn from the movie Suicide Squad as an inspiration. In June 2020, he co-produced "Shine Bright" by Lee Soo-young, which was the fourth OST for the comedy-drama Kkondae Intern. On September 16, Kino produced the Pentagon song "Twenty-Twenty", which was the first OST for the web drama Twenty-Twenty. He and bandmate Hongseok later made a cameo in the drama a month later. On October 12, Pentagon released their 10th mini album We:th, for which he produced two songs: "Beautiful Goodbye" and "Paradise". Kino shared that the online album art cover was drawn by him as a gift to Pentagon's leader Hui. This marks Kino's "debut drawing". He also drew the teaser image and the inside pages of the album. In November, Kino participated as the first artist in Unordinary Sunday's project album with the song "Poison ( )". The jazz song describes one's conflicted feelings of leaving behind a toxic person even though he is still in love.

In March 2021, Kino began hosting the Dive Studios podcast Unboxing alongside Astro's Jinjin. He participated in Unordinary Sunday's second project album alongside Yumin with the song "Sunflower", released on May 21. On June 19, Kino was featured on Davii's single "Don't play me love". He wrote and co-produced A.C.E's song "Atlantis" from their EP Siren:Dawn, released on June 23. Days later, he was officially announced as an MC for the FashionN original program titled Follow Me - True to your taste, a beauty program that presents various ways to become pretty, covering fashion, beauty and life.

On August 9, 2022, Kino released the special single "Pose".

=== 2023–present: Departure from Cube Entertainment ===
On October 9, 2023, it was announced that he had left Cube Entertainment alongside fellow Pentagon members Yeo One, Yan An, Yuto, and Wooseok. Following a private listening party event in November, Kino established a one-man agency called Naked in December. He held a solo performance called "Kino's Housewarming Party" in Tokyo, Japan on December 22.

On January 8, 2024, Kino released his first single with Naked called "Fashion Style". He held his first solo concert in Seoul titled "Born Naked" on January 27. In March, he released the single "Freaky Love". He released his first solo EP, If This Is Love, I Want a Refund, on May 2, accompanied by the single "Broke My Heart" featuring American singer Lay Bankz. He later released the singles "Everglow" and "Skyfall".

In January 2025, Kino went on a United States tour, titled I Think I Think Too Much. In October, he released the song "Club Sex Cigarettes" from his upcoming second EP. The EP, titled Everybody's Guilty, but No One's to Blame, was released the following month with the lead single "Dirty Boy" featuring Jamie and Uwa. In January 2026, he embarked on a world tour, titled Free Kino. In April, Kino released his third EP Lost and Found, with the lead single "Taxi". Kino will make his acting debut in the drama Hidden Master Taebaekho.

== Discography ==
=== Extended plays ===
Title	Details	Peak chart positions	Sales
Title	Details	KOR	Sales
If This Is Love, I Want a Refund	Released: May 2, 2024; Label: Naked; Formats: CD, digital download, streaming	26	KOR: 18,354
Everybody's Guilty, but No One's to Blame	Released: October 13, 2025; Label: Naked; Formats: CD, digital download, streaming	14	KOR: 13,842
Lost and Found	Released: April 1, 2026; Label: Naked; Formats: CD, digital download, streaming	23	KOR: 10,789

=== Single albums ===
Title	Details	Peak chart positions	Sales
Title	Details	KOR	Sales
Pose	Released: August 9, 2022; Label: Cube; Formats: CD, digital download, streaming	15	KOR: 19,055

=== Singles ===
Title	Year	Peak chart positions	Album
Title	Year	KOR DL	Album
As lead artist
"Poison (독)" (with Unordinary Sunday)	2020	—	Unordinary Sunday Vol.01
"Sunflower" (with Unordinary Sunday, Yumin)	2021	—	Unordinary Sunday Vol.02
"Pose"	2022	47	Pose
"Fashion Style"	2024	—	If This Is Love, I Want a Refund
"Freaky Love"	2024	—	If This Is Love, I Want a Refund
"Broke My Heart" (ft. Lay Bankz)	2024	—	If This Is Love, I Want a Refund
"Dancing On The Road"	2024	—	Non-album singles
"Everglow"	2024	—	Non-album singles
"Skyfall"	2025	—	Non-album singles
"Club Sex Cigarettes"	2025	—	Everybody's Guilty, But No One's To Blame
"Dirty Boy" (featuring Jamie, UWA)	2025	—	Everybody's Guilty, But No One's To Blame
"Taxi"	2026	—	Lost And Found
Collaborations
"Chillin" (as M.O.L.A)	2018	—	Non-album single
As featured artist
"Pick Up the Phone (PUTP)" (전화받아) (Park Ji-min featuring Kino, Woodz and Nathan	2018	—	JiminxJamie
"Gravity" (Jinho of Pentagon featuring Kino)	2020	—	Magazine Ho
"Don't Play Me Love" (Davii featuring Kino)	2021	—	Don't Play Me Love
"Tape 2: Slide" (Fudasca featuring Ted Park and Kino)	2024	—	Non-album single
Soundtrack appearances
"Miss U" (with Jinho and Hui)	2019	—	On the Campus OST
"Stay with Me"	2021	—	Pumpkin Time OST
"A-HA!" (with Jinho)	2022	—	User Not Found OST
"—" denotes releases that did not chart or were not released in that region.

=== Other songs ===
Year	Title	Format	Ref.
2017	"Lonely"	Digital download, streaming	
2017	"Universe"	Digital download, streaming	
2017	"Voicegasm"	Digital download, streaming	
2017	"Eyes"	Digital download, streaming	
2017	"지금 너에게로 가는 중이야"	Digital download, streaming	
2018	"sing for thy son, when he comes in the figure of an angel"	Digital download, streaming	
2018	"Aquatic Talks"	Digital download, streaming	
2018	"Butterfly"	Digital download, streaming	
2018	"Keep Rollin'"	Digital download, streaming	
2018	"Sunshine/Mango"	Digital download, streaming	
2018	"Nobody else"	Digital download, streaming	
2019	"224.12"	Digital download, streaming	
2019	"The Greatest Wall"	Digital download, streaming	
2019	"Badtiming"	Digital download, streaming	
2019	"La Di Da"	Digital download, streaming	
2019	"Do I Deserve It"	Digital download, streaming	
2019	"똑딱"	Digital download, streaming	
2020	"Tell Me What You Want"	Digital download, streaming	
2020	"도망가자 (Rock Ver.)"	Digital download, streaming	
2021	"Beautiful Goodbye (Rock Ver.)"	Digital download, streaming	
2022	"Now Or Never"	Digital download, streaming	

== Choreography ==
Year	Title	Artist	Note(s)	Ref.
2016	"Gorilla"	Pentagon		
2016	"Pentagon"	Pentagon		
2017	"Critical Beauty"	Pentagon		
2017	"Like This"	Pentagon		
2017	"Runaway"	Pentagon		
2017	"Wake Me Up"	Hui, Jo Woo-chan		
2020	"Follow (Pentagon Ver.)"	Pentagon		
2020	"Daisy"	Pentagon	Main and Daisy's challenge choreography.	
2020	"Nostalgia"	Pentagon	Unibong choreography	

== Filmography ==
=== Television series ===
Year	Title	Role	Notes	Ref.
2017	Hello, My Twenties! 2	Cameo	member of idol group Asgard	
2026	Hidden Master Taebaekho	Dexter		

=== Web dramas ===
Year	Title	Role	Notes	Ref.
2020	Twenty-Twenty	Cameo		

=== Variety shows ===
Year	Title	Network	Notes	Ref.
2016	Pentagon Maker	Mnet-M2	Contestant	
2018	Bus King	BerryTV	Main cast, MC, 6 episodes	
2019	Bookmark	GlanceTv		
2019	GINI Stage	MBC	Contestant, as Cheering Team 2	
2020	Idol Cooking Class	STATV	with Hui, Hongseok and Shinwon	
2021	Follow Me - True to your taste	U+ Idol Live	MC with Ha Sung-woon, Kwon Eun-bi and Song Ji-ah	
2021	Hidden: the Performance	KakaoTV	Host with Boi B, Hangzoo, Hanhae, Taeil, Peakboy, Zai.ro and Jeong Se-woon	
2022	Be Mbitious	Mnet	Contestant	

=== Radio ===
Year	Title	Role	Notes	Ref.
2020	Kino's KiSingBooth (키Sing부스)	Host	January 13, 2020 – June 22, 2020	
2021	Kiss the Radio	Host	October 16, 2021 – October 17, 2021	

=== Podcast ===
Year	Title	Platforms	Notes	Ref.
2021	UNBOXING w/ Jinjin & Kino	YouTube, Spotify, Apple Podcast	Host with Jinjin, 12 episodes	
