= Wooseok x Kuanlin =

South Korean musical duo

Wooseok X Kuanlin
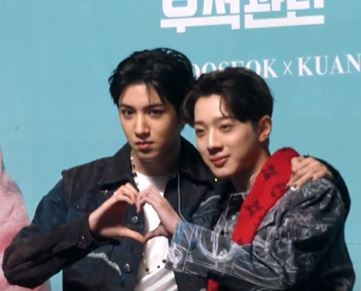
- Wooseok X Kuanlin in March 2019

Background information
- Origin: Seoul, South Korea
- Genres: K-pop; hip hop
- Years active: 2019
- Labels: Cube
- Past members: Wooseok; Kuanlin
- Website: cubeent.co.kr/wooseokxkuanlin

Wooseok X Kuanlin (우석X관린) was a South Korean musical duo formed by Cube Entertainment in 2019, composed of Wooseok of Pentagon and Lai Kuan-lin, a former member of Wanna One. On February 20, 2019, Cube Entertainment announced the formation of a new group project featuring Lai alongside Wooseok. The duo debuted on March 11 of the same year with 9801, featuring title song "I'm a Star".

== History ==
=== Pre-debut ===
On February 19, 2019, Cube Entertainment announced a new unit. On February 22, Cube officially revealed the unit's name and members.

=== 2019: Debut with 9801 ===
Wooseok X Kuanlin debuted on March 11, 2019 with the EP 9801 and its title track "I'm A Star". The EP contains one unit track and two solo songs each from the members. It debuted at number two on the Gaon Weekly Album Chart and sold over thirty-six thousand copies.

== Discography ==
=== Extended plays ===
Title	Album details	Peak chart positions	Sales
Title	Album details	KOR	Sales
9801	Released: March 11, 2019; Label: Cube Entertainment; Formats: CD, digital download	2	KOR: 36,242

=== Singles ===
Title	Year	Peak chart positions		Album
Title	Year	KOR		Album
Title	Year	KOR	Hot	Album
"I'm A Star" (별짓)	2019	—	97	9801
"—" denotes items that did not chart or were not released in that region.
