= Showtime (South Korean TV series) =

- Genre: Variety, Reality
- Country of origin: South Korea
- Original language: Korean
- No. of seasons: 7
- No. of episodes: 57

Production
- Production location: South Korea
- Camera setup: Multi-camera
- Running time: approx. 50 minutes

Original release
- Network: MBC every1
- Release: November 18, 2013 – present

Showtime (Korean: 쇼타임) is a South Korean reality show. The show already has 7 seasons, and has featured the groups, EXO, Beast, Apink, Sistar, EXID Infinite, GFriend, Mamamoo. With the exception of EXO, Beast, and Infinite season which ran for 12 episodes, the seasons that followed all have 8 episodes each. The fifth season ("EXID's Showtime") premiered on July 9, 2015.

On November 12, it was revealed that the South Korean boy group INFINITE received an offer to star in the sixth season of Showtime. It was first reported that they have been confirmed to star in the reality show. However, their agency Woollim Entertainment stated that "they are reviewing the offer positively but nothing has been confirmed with nothing set in motion yet." Other versions of the news stated that the first broadcast will start in December 2015 and is INFINITE's 1st reality show in 1 year and 8 months since their last reality show titled "This is INFINITE" which ended in March 2014. The concept of the show will also be "Q & A Variety", with INFINITE members answering questions from fans.

== Seasons ==
=== Season 1: EXO's Showtime ===
EXO's Showtime is a reality TV show that allows the fans to see behind-the-scenes of Exo's daily lives and how they act offstage.

=== Season 2: Showtime: Burning the Beast ===
Showtime: Burning the Beast (쇼타임: 버닝 더 비스트) is the second season of the South Korean reality series Showtime which featured the South Korean boy group Beast. The concept of the season is through Q & A Variety, with Beast members personally answering questions from fans.

On April 10, a press conference was held for Beast's upcoming reality show, Showtime: Burning the Beast. PD Jang Jae-hyuk explained the difference between EXO's Showtime and the current season, stating that "Beast is a top idol group and just because of that fact, the programme is already television-worthy. Fans of Beast will also be able to watch a new side of them if they watch the show." He added, "The atmosphere was fresh and not very organized during EXO's Showtime but even during the first recording, Beast delivered a full and stable performance. Viewers will also be able to feel humor and wit together with the relaxed atmosphere with Beast."

Furthermore, the reality series is one of the first in a few years, since MBC Every1's Idol Maid in 2010. Member Yang Yo-seob shared that they'll show a fun and impressive side of them with this upcoming reality show.

=== Season 3: Apink's Showtime ===
Apink's Showtime (에이핑크의 쇼타임) is the third season of South Korean reality television series Showtime that premiered on MBC Every1 on November 28, 2014.

On July 18, MBC Every1 announced that Apink will be the next group features on the Showtime for its third season, they were the first girl group to features on the show. With the announcement, a rep added, "Apink will show different charms from EXO and B2ST as they show their daily life through Showtime."

During the press conference on August 6, PD Yoon Mi Jin, the main producer of Showtime, revealed the reason for casting Apink for the new season,"They are the hottest girl group of 2014, that is why," and continued to explain, "Apink and the members as individuals are pursuing activities through both variety and dramas, so we thought people might be curious about them. As their curve of success has been soaring since their debut, we chose them as the main characters of our third season."

Apink members also shared their thoughts on filming another reality show after Apink News. Nam-joo said, "There are a lot of things we are revealing for the first time through this reality program. Of course, there are our bare faces. We also reveal our dorm. We think we're going to put in a lot of ourselves as is. I think people will be able to feel like they're doing the things with us rather than watching a program." While Na-Eun added, "Not too long ago, we filmed at a water park, and I played so excitedly to the point I didn't even notice the cameras. I do worry about how it may look onscreen, but we received a lot of interest through a reality program when we debuted. I hope the same will happen this time."

Apink's Showtime premiered on August 7, 2014 and aired every Thursday with total of eight episodes. The first episode recorded a 1.35% average rating and peaked at 1.74%, highest rating for first episode of Showtime and a solid numbers for an idol reality show on a cable channel. It was also well received by female viewers as it recorded 2.1% average rating among women.

At the last of each episode, Apink Members shared their cherished item to give to one of her fans by drawing.

=== Season 4: Sistar's Showtime ===
SISTAR's Showtime is the fourth season of South Korean reality television series Showtime that premiered on MBC Every1 on January 8, 2015.

=== Season 5: EXID's Showtime ===
EXID Showtime is the fifth season of South Korean reality television series Showtime that premiered on MBC Every1 on July 9, 2015.

=== Season 6: Infinite's Showtime ===
INFINITE's Showtime is the sixth season of South Korean reality television series Showtime that premiered on MBC Every1 on December 15, 2015

At the press conference on December 10, 2015, the members promised to show a different side of INFINITE. Kim Sung-kyu said, "It feels good to be able to participate in 'Showtime.' It's been a while since the last time we filmed a reality program with all the members. We worked hard so please anticipate the broadcast."

The PD for the show revealed, "We wanted to cast INFINITE because they had shown themselves to be talented in many reality programs before. Not only do we plan to show their ordinary daily lives, but we also plan to revisit the memories the members made together."

"Through the broadcast we will show our daily lives, our daily interactions, and even our daily conflicts," Nam Woo-hyun said.

"We've been together for six years, so there's bound to be some conflict," Sunggyu added. Infinite will show us their natural interaction as Sunggyu said, "Woohyun and I actually fought recently, but we resolved it over a bottle of soju. That kind of natural interaction will be seen through the broadcast."

=== Season 7: GFRIEND x MAMAMOO's Showtime ===
GFRIEND x MAMAMOO Showtime was the first Showtime to include two groups at once. The show aired for 8 episodes and included some episodes with the two groups together and some episodes separate.

One episode of the show was shot with GFRIEND in Los Angeles and Mamamoo in New York during their performances at KCON in the US.

The two groups met up during the final episode and performed a series of games together.
