= Chiaki Mayumura =

Japanese singer-songwriter

Chiaki Mayumura 眉村ちあき
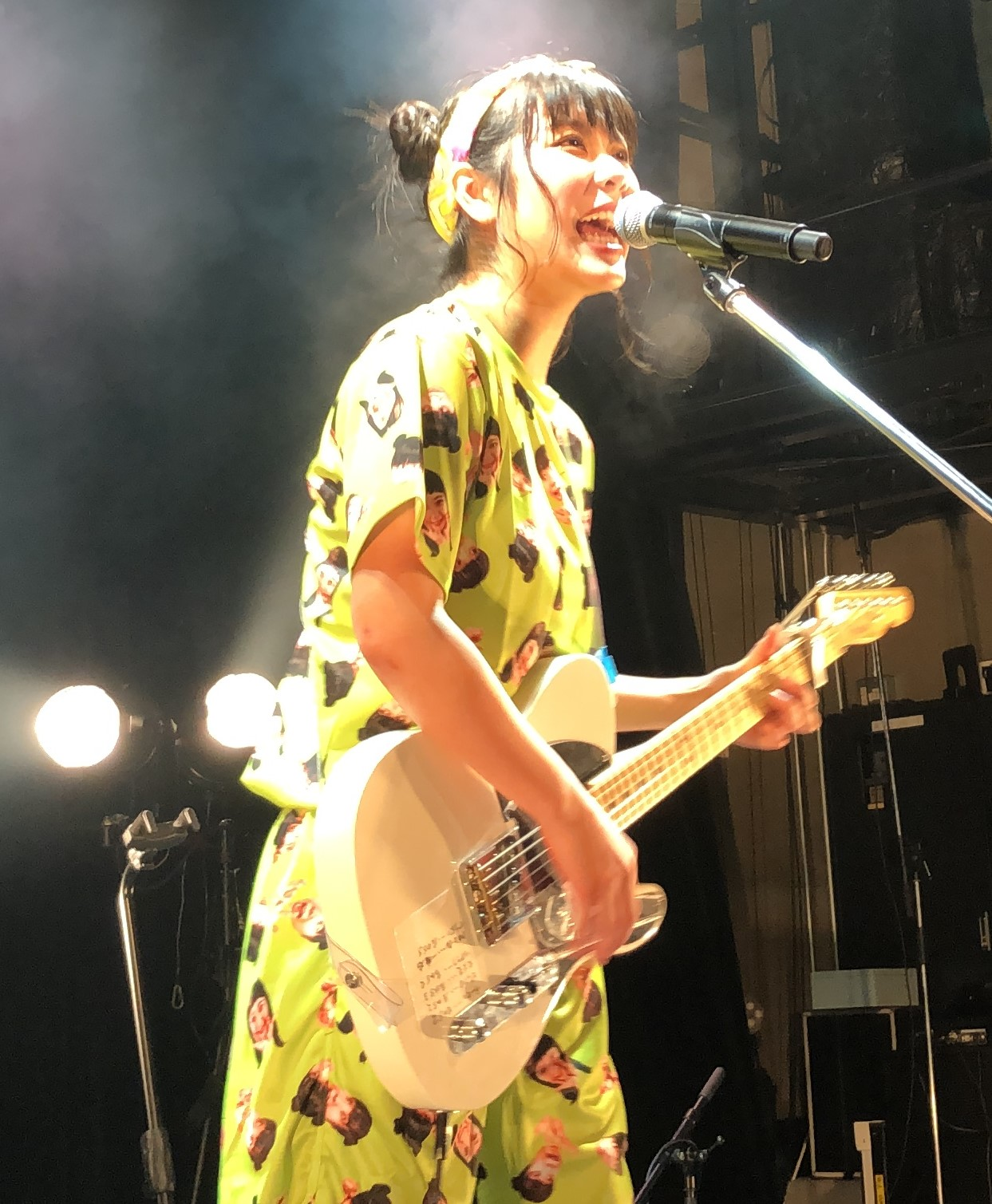
- Chiaki Mayumura performing at Shibuya WWW on 7 November 2019

Background information
- Born: September 12, 1996 (age 29); Tokyo, Japan
- Genres: J-pop
- Occupations: Japanese idol, singer, songwriter, chairperson
- Instruments: Guitar, PC
- Years active: 2015–present
- Labels: AP Records; Label Janaimon; Toy's Factory
- Website: mayumura.tetetetetetetetetete.club

Chiaki Mayumura (眉村ちあき, Mayumura Chiaki; born September 12, 1996) is a Japanese idol singer and songwriter currently associated with Toy's Factory. She has released five major albums charting on Oricon's Top 100. She calls herself a “track maker idol with playing guitar”. She is also the chairperson of Kaishaja Naimon Co., Ltd (Not Company (Note: "Not Company" is actual her company name.)). Fans call her Chi-chan.

== Biography ==
Since Chiaki's father was from Okinawa, Japan, she liked to sing Okinawan music and dance to it in her childhood. She was influenced by South Korean pop group TVXQ, and originally dreamed of being a singer in 8th grade.

Though initially having plans to enter nursing school after graduation, she was further influenced by South Korean singer BoA, and ultimately decided to study music instead.

At the recommendation of a vocal instructor, she joined the (defunct as of July 2016) idol group Star-Bright★REX under the name Chiaki (Chī-chan). (Note: Currently she is called Chi-chan.)

On February 11, 2016, she began her solo career as Chiaki Mayumura (眉村ちあき), writing her own songs and holding concerts. At first, she sang with karaoke accompaniment, however, transitioned to acoustic guitar one month later.

On December 22, 2017, she held a press conference in Karasuyama Community Center, Tokyo, and she announced she registered and founded “Kaishaja Naimon Co., Ltd”. Since then, share certificates have been sold at her concerts.

On June 10, 2018, she appeared on a Japanese television program known as God Tongue (Goddotan・ゴッドタン), where she ad-libbed a song about vomit called Gero (ゲロ).

A staff member of Toy's Factory, a Japanese record label, was impressed by her performance. Under Toy's Factory, she released her debut album, "Mejameja Monja" on May 7, 2019.

== Discography ==
=== Albums ===
List of albums, with selected chart positions
Title	Information	Oricon peak position
Sūpāsaia (Chi) (スーパーサイア「ち」)	Released: March 2016; Label: none	—
Hipar Saiyan Chi	Released: March 18, 2016; Label: none	—
Taitoru nashi (タイトルなし)	Released: November 2016; Label: none	—
Hatachi no Onna obu Amerika (ハタチの女 オブ アメリカ, Twenty-year-old woman of America)	Released: August 5, 2017; Label: none	—
Poppoppo Arenji syu (ぽっぽっぽアレンジ集)	Released: August 5, 2017; Label: none	—
Michinaru Pawā Arenji syu (未知なるパワーアレンジ集)	Released: October 26, 2017; Label: none	—
Norijiru (海苔汁, Nori Miso Soup)	Released: November 2, 2017; Label: none	—
Germanium	Released: January 4, 2018; Label: none	—
Mejiri kara Suiteki Sanko, modoru (目尻から水滴3個、戻る)	Released: May 25, 2018; Label: Label Janaimon; Catalog No.: LJNM-0004; Re-recordings of Germanium, Norijiru and Hatachi no Onna obu Amerika	—
Gisshiri Haguki (ぎっしり歯ぐき)	Released: January 9, 2019; Label: Label Janaimon; Catalog No.: QZCT-1004; Compilations of her previous releases	41
Gisshiri Haguki (ぎっしり歯ぐき)	Released: April 14, 2021; Label: Toy's Factory; Catalog No.: TFCC-86751; Re-released by Toy's Factory as a major-label album	41
Mejameja Monja (めじゃめじゃもんじゃ)	Released: May 7, 2019; Label: Toy's Factory; Catalog No.: TFCC-86657	45
Gekidan Ogyarizumu (劇団オギャリズム)	Released: January 8, 2020; Label: Toy's Factory; Catalog No.: TFCC-86697 (Limited Edition), TFCC-86698 (Regular Edition)	21
Nippon Genki Onna Kashu (日本元気女歌手)	Released: December 9, 2020; Label: Toy's Factory; Catalog No.: TFCC-86729 (Limited Edition), TFCC-86730 (Regular Edition)	57
ima	Released: February 23, 2022; Label: Toy's Factory; Catalog No.: TFCC-86822 (Limited Edition), TFCC-86824 (Regular Edition)	52
Mayumura Chiaki's Ongakutai (at Nakano Sunplaza 2021.9.17) (眉村ちあきの音楽隊 (at 中野サンプラザ 2021.9.17))	Released: February 23, 2022; Label: Toy's Factory; Digital download only	—
SAI	Released: May 7, 2023; Label: Toy's Factory; Catalog no.: TFCC-81009	44
Ufufu (うふふ)	Released: November 27, 2024; Label: Toy's Factory; Catalog no.: TFCC-81098	—
Ampland Plan	Released: April 15, 2026; Label: Toy's Factory; Catalog no.: TFCC-81191	36

=== Singles (Digital download only) ===
Title	Information
Nandakke? (なんだっけ?, What was that?)	Released: June 25, 2018
Indo no Ringo Yasan (インドのリンゴ屋さん, India apple shop)	Released: June 25, 2018
Pikkoro Mushi (ピッコロ虫, Piccolo insect)	Released: July 8, 2018
Honki no Rabusongu (本気のラブソング, Serious love song)	Released: September 1, 2018
Ogikubo Senshuken (荻窪選手権, Ogikubo Championship)	Released: September 1, 2018
Burabō (Mayumura Beya MIX) (ブラボー (眉村部屋MIX), Bravo (Mayumura Room Mix))	Released: November 15, 2018
Te Wo Toriaukarane (手を取り合うからね)	Released: June 5, 2020
Kyousyuujyo (教習所)	Released: June 30, 2020
Kao Don (顔ドン)	Released: July 22, 2020
Hensachi2dance (feat. Tamaya2060%) (偏差値2ダンス feat.玉屋2060%)	Released: August 28, 2020
Boukentai Mori-no-Yuusha (冒険隊 ～森の勇者～)	Released: September 18, 2020
Kono Asa Wo Ikiteiru (この朝を生きている)	Released: April 14, 2021
Individual	Released: July 7, 2021
Akuyaku (悪役, Villain)	Released: August 4, 2021
Mohīto Daimao (モヒート大魔王, Mojito Daimao)	Released: September 12, 2021
Akuyaku (Band ver.) (悪役 (Band ver.), Villain (Band ver.))	Released: September 18, 2021
Mede Hoppe Don (愛でほっぺ丼)	Released: October 24, 2021
Kokuhaku Suteppusu (告白ステップス, Kokuhaku Steps)	Released: February 9, 2022
Marukoppa (マルコッパ)	Released: May 30, 2022
Himitsu no Koi (Solo ver.) (秘密の恋 (Solo ver.), Secret Love (Solo ver.))	Released: December 15, 2022
Himitsu no Koi (Band ver.) (秘密の恋 (Band ver.), Secret Love (Band ver.))	Released: December 15, 2022
Nantoka Zaurusu (ナントカザウルス, Nantokasaurus)	Released: January 23, 2023
Bakemon (バケモン)	Released: February 9, 2024
Furaidē Naito Kisu (フライデー・ナイト・キス, Friday Night Kiss)	Released: May 31, 2025

=== EPs (Digital download only) ===
Title	Information
Marukoppa Tachi (マルコッパ達)	Released: July 7, 2022
Love Song Shi No Hajimeni (ラブソング史のはじめに)	Released: April 17, 2024

=== DVD/Blu-ray ===
Title	Information
Mayumura Chiaki Nippon Budokan Live [Nippon Genki Onna Kashu -Yume Dakedo Yume Ja Nakatta-] (眉村ちあき 日本武道館LIVE「日本元気女歌手 ～夢だけど夢じゃなかった～」)	Released: October 20, 2021; Catalog No.: TFXQ-78187
Mayumura Chiaki no Subete (Kari) (眉村ちあきのすべて(仮), ALL ABOUT CHIAKI MAYUMURA (Provisional))	Released: December 3, 2021; Catalog No.: OED-10803

== Filmography ==
Title	Year	Role
Yume no Oto (夢の音, My music)	2019	Aoi Mikami (三上葵)
Mayumura Chiaki no Subete (Kari) (眉村ちあきのすべて(仮), ALL ABOUT CHIAKI MAYUMURA (Provisional))	2019	Chiaki Mayumura (眉村ちあき)
Sugao no Mayumura Chiaki (素顔の眉村ちあき)	2021	Chiaki Mayumura (眉村ちあき)
Hādo Boirudo Reshipi (ハードボイルド・レシピ, HARD-BOILED RECIPE)	2024	Taisho 02/Akuto Senmon Bodei Gādo (対象02/悪党専門ボディガード, Subject 02/Bodyguard specializing in villains)
