= Lai Kuan-lin =

Taiwanese rapper and singer (born 2001)

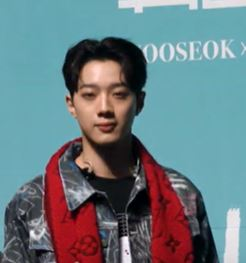
- Lai in March 2019
- Born: 23 September 2001 (age 25); Taipei, Taiwan
- Other name: Edward Lai
- Occupations: Rapper; singer; actor; film director
- Musical career
- Genres: K-pop; C-pop
- Instrument: Vocals
- Years active: 2017–2024
- Labels: Cube; YMC (Note: As a member of Wanna One only.); Swing; Hot Idol
- Formerly of: Wanna One; Wooseok x Kuanlin; United Cube

Chinese name
- Chinese: 賴冠霖
Transcriptions
Standard Mandarin
- Hanyu Pinyin: Lài Guānlín
- Wade–Giles: Lai Kuan-lin
Southern Min
- Hokkien POJ: Lōa Koan-lîm

Signature
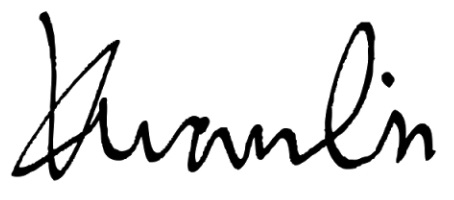

Lai Kuan-lin, also romanized as Lai Guanlin and better known mononymously as Guanlin, (Chinese: 賴冠霖; Pe̍h-ōe-jī: Lōa Koan-lîm; Korean: 라이관린; born 23 September 2001) is a Taiwanese former singer and actor. After finishing seventh on second season of South Korean competition series Produce 101, he joined the boy band Wanna One. After it was disbanded in January 2019, he formed a duo with Pentagon's Wooseok as Wooseok x Kuanlin in March 2019 and released an album. From 2019, he pursued a solo career in China, primarily as an actor, before moving into behind-the-scenes work in 2024.

== Early life ==
Lai was born in Taipei, Taiwan. Under his English name Edward Lai, he lived in Los Angeles, US for five years until he returned to Taiwan. He attended Lin-kou High School.

== Career ==
=== 2017–2018: Produce 101 and Wanna One ===
Lai was recruited by Cube Entertainment during the Cube Star World Audition in Taiwan in 2016. In 2017, Lai participated in the second season of Produce 101, representing Cube Entertainment. He ranked seventh during the final episode with 905,875 votes, securing him a place in the show's project boy group Wanna One under YMC Entertainment.

In November 2017, Lai appeared in labelmate Jeon So-yeon's music video for her single "Jelly".

As well as being active as a Wanna One member in South Korea, Lai is also active in China, receiving an offer from skincare brand Dr. Jart to be their brand ambassador, resulting in a great success for the company with over ₩900 million (US$800,000) of the endorsed product being sold in 56 minutes.

=== 2019–2024: Acting debut, departure from Cube Entertainment and retirement ===
After Wanna One's disbandment on 31 December 2018, Cube Entertainment announced that Lai would focus on solo activities in China and that he would debut in a new boy group later in the year. He was confirmed to be the guest on variety show Happy Camp.

In January 2019, Lai was confirmed as male lead in Chinese drama A Little Thing Called First Love. Lai, alongside Yoo Seon-ho and Ha Neul, were chosen as new models for TBJ clothing brand in February 2019.

On 20 February 2019, Cube Entertainment announced that Lai would participate in a new group project alongside Pentagon's Wooseok titled Wooseok x Kuanlin. The unit released their debut extended play, 9801, on 11 March, with the title song, "I'm a Star". Lai held his first fanmeeting 'Good Feeling' on 6 April at Olympic Hall in Seoul. Followed by Bangkok (20 April), Singapore (30 April), Taipei (4 and 20 May) and Hong Kong (11 May).

In July 2019, Lai requested to terminate his contract with Cube Entertainment. One of the claims Lai made was that Cube Entertainment had sold his artist management rights in China to a third party without notifying him. After the legal dispute, Lai moved his career to China. On 17 June 2021, the Seoul Central District Court ruled in Lai's favour and ended his contract with Cube Entertainment.

In June 2020, Lai was cast in youth drama Don't Think About Interrupting My Studies as the main lead, Lin Xiao Ran, alongside Li Landi as Nan Xiangwan.

In 2021, Lai debuted as film director for the short film Em Chu Em Nie Zi Bo (Winter & Spring Are Fighting). The film won for the month of June 2021 in the Rome Prisma Independent Film Awards. Lai won best director while the short film won Best of Fest, Best Cinematography, Best Leading Actress and Best Costume Design.

In June 2024, Lai was photographed with a female companion, sparking rumors of a romantic relationship. Two days after the photos surfaced, he announced his decision to "switch career paths" and retire from the entertainment industry. In October 2024, Lai appeared in CCTV news footage attending a meeting between Song Tao, head of PRC's Taiwan Affairs Office, and figures from Taiwan's cultural sector. In June 2025, Lai joined the film and television company Wanhe Tianyi as a director. In September 2025, Lai was an invited guest at the 2025 China Victory Day Parade in Tiananmen Square.

== Endorsements ==
In 2018 and 2019, Lai Kuan-lin became an ambassador for Dr.Jart+, MGTV International APP, Chinese Social Assistance Foundation and Green Carpet Action (Marie Claire x China Green Foundation). He has endorsed Nongfu Spring (农夫山泉), TBJ, L'Oréal and Downy, KM Pharmaceutical (XYLIS), Perfect Diary, VIVLAS Lipstick, Wolong Nuts and elleair.

In March 2021, Lai announced support for cotton from Xinjiang in mainland China, after some companies had expressed concerns about human rights abuses. The premier of Taiwan, Su Tseng-chang, later said that some of Taiwan's celebrities were selfish for expressing support for Xinjiang's cotton, and said that generations of people had worked hard in Taiwan to achieve democracy and its respect for human rights.

== Filmography ==
=== Television series ===
Year	Title	Original title	Role	Network	Notes	Ref.
2019	A Little Thing Called First Love	初恋那件小事	Liang Younian	Hunan TV	Lead role	
2021	Don't Disturb My Study	别想打扰我学习	Lin Xiao Ran	Mango TV	Lead role	
2022	Love The Way You Are	爱情应该有的样子	Xu Guang Xi	iQiyi	Lead Role	

=== Variety shows ===
Year	Title	Network	Notes	Ref.
2017	Produce 101 Season 2	Mnet	Contestant	
2019	Super Penguin League Season 2	超级企鹅联盟 Super3	Player; Live Basketball Competition	

== Concert ==
=== Concert participation ===
- U & Cube Festival 2019 in Japan (23 March)

== Awards and nominations ==
Year presented, name of the award ceremony, award category, nominated work and the result of the nomination
Year	Award	Category	Nominated work	Result	Ref.
2019	14th Asia Model Awards	Asia Special Award	—N/a	Won	
2019	China Youth Public Welfare Award Ceremony	Next Generation Influencers for Global Philanthropy	—N/a	Won	
2019	Golden Bud - The Fourth Network Film And Television Festival	Best Newcomer	A Little Thing Called First Love	Won	
2019	Cosmo Glam Night	Person of the Year (Beauty)	—N/a	Won	
2019	Sina Fashion Awards	Popular Idol of the Year	—N/a	Won	
