= Wooseok =

South Korean rapper

- 정우석
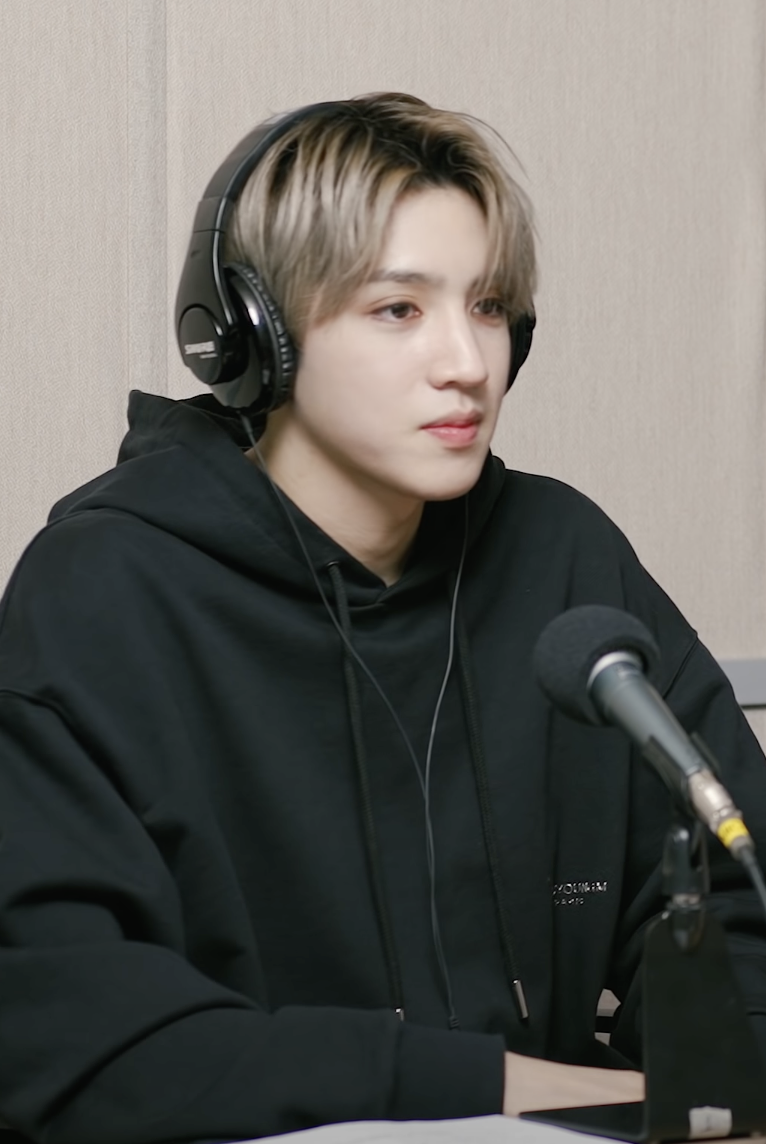
- Wooseok in 2021
- Born: Jung Woo-seok; January 31, 1998 (age 28); Gwangju, South Korea
- Education: School of Performing Arts Seoul
- Occupations: Rapper; singer; songwriter; composer
- Musical career
- Genres: K-pop; hip hop
- Years active: 2016–present
- Labels: Cube; Universal Music Japan; UNDFND; S27M
- Member of: Pentagon; KIK
- Formerly of: Wooseok X Kuanlin; United Cube
- Website: cubeent.co.kr/pentagon

Korean name
- Hangul: 정우석
- RR: Jeong Useok
- MR: Chŏng Usŏk

Jung Woo-seok (Korean: 정우석; born January 31, 1998), also known by the mononym Wooseok, is a South Korean rapper, singer, songwriter, and composer. He debuted as a member of the South Korean boy group Pentagon in October 2016 and also formed a duo with Lai Kuan-lin as Wooseok X Kuanlin in March 2019, under Cube Entertainment. In 2025, he created the project band KIK.

== Early life and education ==
Wooseok was born in Gwangju, South Korea on January 31, 1998. In 2017, he graduated from the School of Performing Arts in Seoul. When he was a child, he played violin and piano, and he regularly participated in competitions and won awards.

== Career ==
=== 2016–2022: Debut with Pentagon, Wooseok X Kuanlin, and solo activities ===
Wooseok participated in Mnet's reality survival program, Pentagon Maker. He made his official debut with Pentagon on October 10, 2016 with the song "Gorilla" from their self-titled EP.

In 2017, Wooseok co-wrote the Produce 101 Season 2 hit song "Never" and Wanna One's debut title track, "Energetic" together with Pentagon's leader Hui. Later in September, Wooseok made a cameo with other members of Pentagon as the idol group Asgard in the drama Hello, My Twenties! 2. He appeared in the music video of labelmate Jeon So-yeon's debut song "Jelly" in November.

On March 24, 2018 Wooseok debuted as a model during 2018 F/W Hera Seoul Fashion Week for the designer brand R.Shemiste. On June 19, he was featured on the song "Ain't No Time" by Kim Dong-han from Kim's debut EP D-Day. On February 22, 2019, Cube Entertainment announced that Wooseok would be debuting in a new unit project alongside labelmate and former Wanna One member Lai Kuan-lin. The unit, Wooseok X Kuanlin, made their debut on March 11, 2019 with the title track "I'm A Star" and debut extended play, 9801. The EP contains two solo songs, "Always Difficult Always Beautiful" and "Domino", both of which were co-written and co-produced by Wooseok.

In 2020, Wooseok was cast in tvN's new variety show, Decoding Meow alongside Yoo Seon-ho which premiered on January 5. On January 14, Wooseok was featured in Jeong Young-eun's "Fine Day", and he participated in the song's lyrics. In October, Wooseok was confirmed as a contestant on the rap competition program Show Me The Money 9. During the 60 Second Team Trials, he received one pass and three fails from the producers, and was subsequently eliminated from the show.

On January 20, 2021, Wooseok was confirmed to make his web drama debut as the lead in Dingo Music's Fling at Convenience Store. In February, he starred in the web drama Nickname Pine Leaf for the SBS YouTube channel yogurD, where he plays two different versions of himself: PD Jung Seok-woo and Pentagon's Wooseok. In July, he was cast as the lead in his second Dingo Music web drama Those Who Want to Catch.

=== 2023–present: Departure from Cube Entertainment and KIK ===
In April 2023, Wooseok replaced bandmate Shinwon as the DJ of Pentagon's Night Radio. He collaborated with Filipino singer Maymay Entrata on the song "Autodeadma", which was released on April 28. On October 9, it was announced that Wooseok had left Cube Entertainment alongside fellow Pentagon members Yeo One, Yan An, Yuto, and Kino. On December 21, he released a duet with singer Soyeon of Laboum titled "We Are I" as a part of MBTI Project.

On January 2, 2024, Wooseok signed an exclusive contract with UNDFND Entertainment, and announced an album and fan meeting within the first half of the year. He released his first single album Empty Paper with the lead single "Navy Blue" and the b-side "Sketch" on February 24. In late May, he released the English song "You" alongside Australian-Japanese producer Taka Perry. He released another version of the song featuring Finnish singer Robin Packalen in June.

In February 2025, Wooseok released the song "Romance", and appeared on an episode of King of Mask Singer. The following month, signed with S27M Entertainment to begin activities as an actor. In May, he released his debut EP, Ender to Ander. He collaborated with Japanese singer Chiaki Mayumura on the city pop song "Friday Night Kiss". Wooseok created the project band KIK alongside Jung Min-hyuk of Lacuna and Oh Myung-seok of SURL. Their self-titled debut EP was released in June, with the lead single "Simple". The same month, Wooseok was one of the six artists out of nearly 800 applicants selected for the CJ Cultural Foundation's Tune Up program, which supports indie artists by providing 25 million won for two album productions, concert support, and other benefits. He held a solo concert in Tokyo in August. In September, Wooseok was announced as a contestant on the band-making survival show Steal Heart Club. He also he co-wrote the singles "Fly to the Youth" by Nowz featuring Yuqi and "Gone" by Yuqi.

== Discography ==
=== Extended plays ===
| Title | Details | Peak chart positions | Sales |
| Title | Details | KOR | Sales |
|---|---|---|---|
| Ender to Ander | Released: May 13, 2025; Label: UNDFND; Formats: Digital download, streaming | — | — |
"—" denotes releases that did not chart or were not released in that region.

=== Singles ===
| Title | Year | Peak chart positions | Album |
| Title | Year | KOR | Album |
As lead artist
| "Navy Blue" | 2024 | — | Empty Paper |
| "Angel" | 2024 | — | Digital Single |
| "Romance" | 2025 | — | Ender to Ander |
| "U" | 2026 | — | Digital Single |
As featured artist
| "Ain't No Time" (Kim Dong-han feat. Wooseok) | 2018 | — | D-Day |
| "Fine Day" (MosPick, Jeong Young-eun feat. Wooseok) | 2020 | — | Non-album singles |
| "Autodeadma" (Maymay Entrata feat. Wooseok) | 2023 | — | Digital Single |
Collaborations
| "This Stop Is" (with Hui and YooA) | 2018 | — | Gag-Singer Producer - Streaming |
| "We Are I" (with Soyeon) | 2023 | — | Digital Single |
| "You" (with Taka Perry) | 2024 | — | Digital Single |
| "Without" (with Someone Else's Rain) | 2024 | — | Digital Single |
| "Friday Night Kiss" (with Chiaki Mayumura) | 2025 | — | Digital Single |
Soundtrack appearances
| "How Can I Do" (with Jinho and Hui) | 2019 | — | Welcome to Waikiki 2 Part 4 OST |
"—" denotes releases that did not chart or were not released in that region.

== Filmography ==
=== Drama ===
| Year | Title | Role | Notes | Ref. |
|---|---|---|---|---|
| 2017 | Hello, My Twenties! 2 | Thor / Park Woo-seok | Cameo | |

=== Web series ===
| Year | Title | Role | Note | Ref. |
|---|---|---|---|---|
| 2021 | Fling at Convenience Store | Himself | Main role | |
| 2021 | Nickname Pine Leaf | Himself | Main role | |
| 2021 | Those Who Want to Catch | Himself | Main role | |

=== Variety shows ===
| Year | Title | Notes | Ref. |
|---|---|---|---|
| 2016 | Pentagon Maker | Contestant | |
| 2020 | Decoding Meow | Cast member | |
| 2020 | Show Me the Money 9 | Contestant | |
| 2021 | We Cycle | Host | |
| 2025 | King of Mask Singer | Contestant | |
| 2025 | TV Show Authentic Treasures | Guest Panelist | |
| 2025 | Steal Heart Club | Contestant | |

=== Radio presenting ===
| Year | Title | Network | Notes | Ref. |
|---|---|---|---|---|
| 2023–present | Pentagon's Night Radio | EBS | DJ | |
