= Cube Entertainment =

South Korean company

Cube Entertainment, Inc.
- Native name: 주식회사 큐브엔터테인먼트
- Type: Public
- Traded as: KRX: 182360
- Industry: Music; entertainment
- Founded: August 29, 2006; 20 years ago (Note: as Playcube, Inc.)
- Founder: Hong Seung-sung; Shin Jung-hwa
- Headquarters: 7F, F2 Bldg., 83, Achasan-ro, Seongdong-gu, Seoul, South Korea
- Key people: Kang Seung-gon (Co-CEO); Jeong Cheol (Co-CEO)
- Services: Music production, publishing, and artist development and management
- Revenue: ▼ ₩87.23 billion (US$65.08 million) (2025)
- Net income: ▼ ₩5.86 billion (US$4.37 million) (2025)
- Total assets: ▼ ₩258.26 billion (US$192.69 million) (2025)
- Total equity: ▲ ₩152.6 billion (US$113.86 million) (2025)
- Owner: Seung-gon Kang (36.5%); VT Co., Ltd. (8.9%); Cheol Jeong (7.6%); Others (53.1%)
- Number of employees: 170 (2025)
- Subsidiaries: Cube Entertainment Japan; U-Cube
- Website: cubeent.co.kr (Korea) cubeent.jp (Japan)

Cube Entertainment, Inc. (Korean: 주식회사 큐브엔터테인먼트, stylised as CUBE Entertainment) is a South Korean entertainment company. The company operates as a record label, talent agency, music production company, event management and concert production company, and music publishing house. Cube are known for having "self-composing and self-producing" idols. In April 2020, the founder of Cube, Hong Seung-sung, resigned from the company due to an ownership dispute.

The label currently manages several artists, namely Pentagon, I-dle, Lightsum, and Nowz. It also manages several entertainers and actors, including Heo Kyung-hwan, Park Mi-sun, Kim Jin-woo, and Park Sun-young.

It was formerly home to K-pop artists such as Apink, Huh Gak, Rain, G.NA, 4Minute, Beast, Hyuna, CLC, and BtoB.

== History ==
=== 2006–2010: Formation and first-generation artists ===
Cube Entertainment was founded on August 29, 2006, by Hong Seung-sung (aka Simon Hong), former president of JYP Entertainment, and Shin Jung-hwa (Monica Shin) as Playcube Inc. Due to the founder's past relations, Cube is sometimes mistaken as a subsidiary of JYP Entertainment; however, it is an independent corporation.

In 2009, Cube's first two groups debuted, with girl group 4Minute debuting in June and boy group Beast in October.

In 2010, G.NA became the first solo artist in Cube to debut.

=== 2011–2014: Second-generation artists and changing of CEO ===
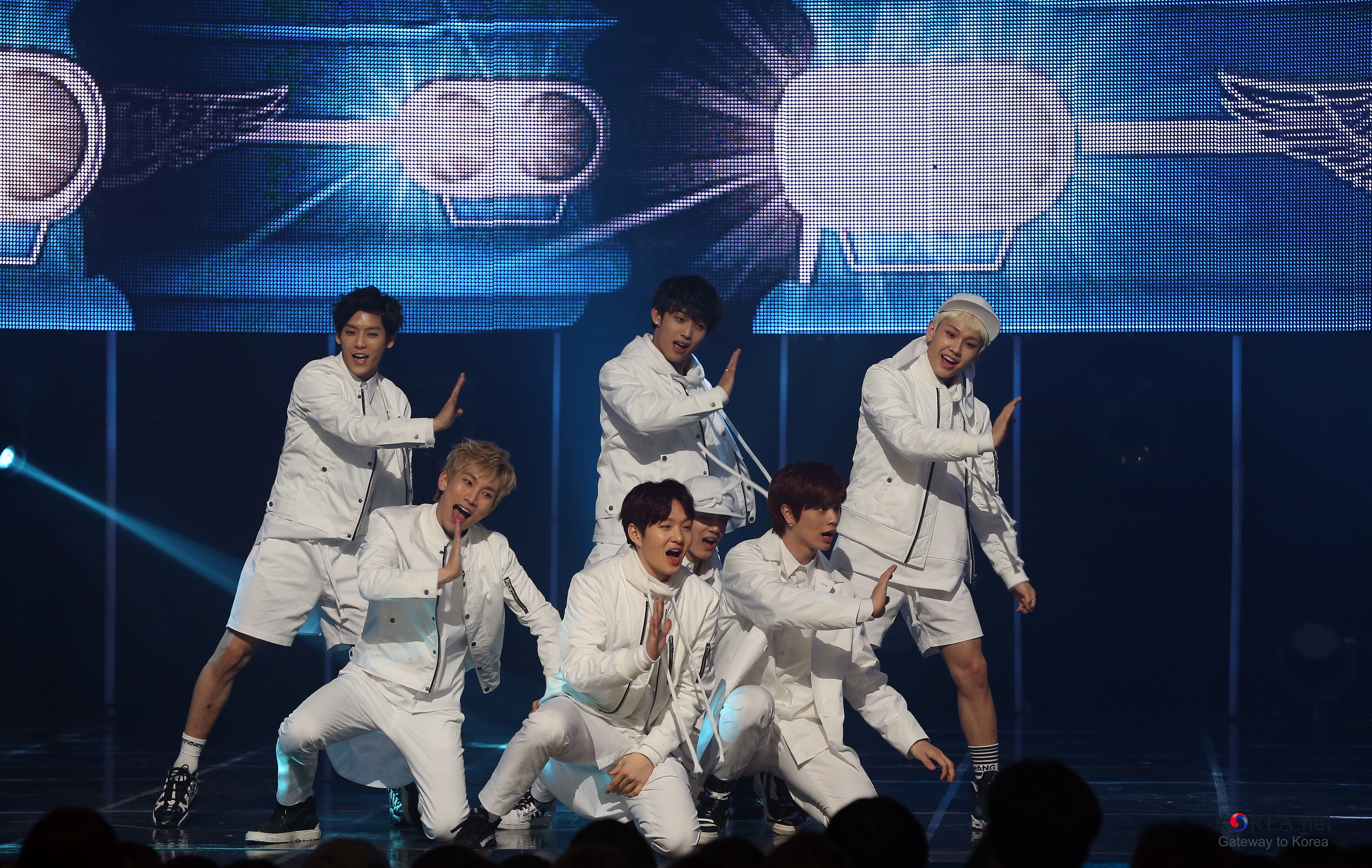
BTOB debuted in 2012. They are nicknamed, the "beagle-dol" due to their unpredictable activeness and goofiness. However, they are also known for their outstanding vocal and rap ability.

In 2011, independent label A Cube Entertainment was founded, managing girl group Apink, who debuted in April of the same year.

In 2012, sub-label Cube DC was launched, managing boy group BtoB, who debuted in March. Comedian Kim Kiri, a regular cast member on Gag Concert, signed onto Cube in September 2012, making him the first comedian under the label. During late 2012, Park Chung-min became the CEO of Cube, after founder Hong Seung-sung stepped down due to his sickness.

In 2013, Korean entertainer Rain signed a contract with Cube Entertainment. He officially joined after he concluded his military service on July 10, 2013. Three months later Cube released a digital single for its new soloist artist, Shin Ji-hoon who placed in the top 6 in Korean singing competition K-pop Star 2. Another new soloist, Oh Ye-ri released her debut digital single, "Because of You" on November 6, 2013. She was the winner of MBC's MBC College Song Festival in 2009.

In August 2014, sub-label Cube DC merged with Cube.

=== 2015–2017: Third-generation artists and changing of CEO ===
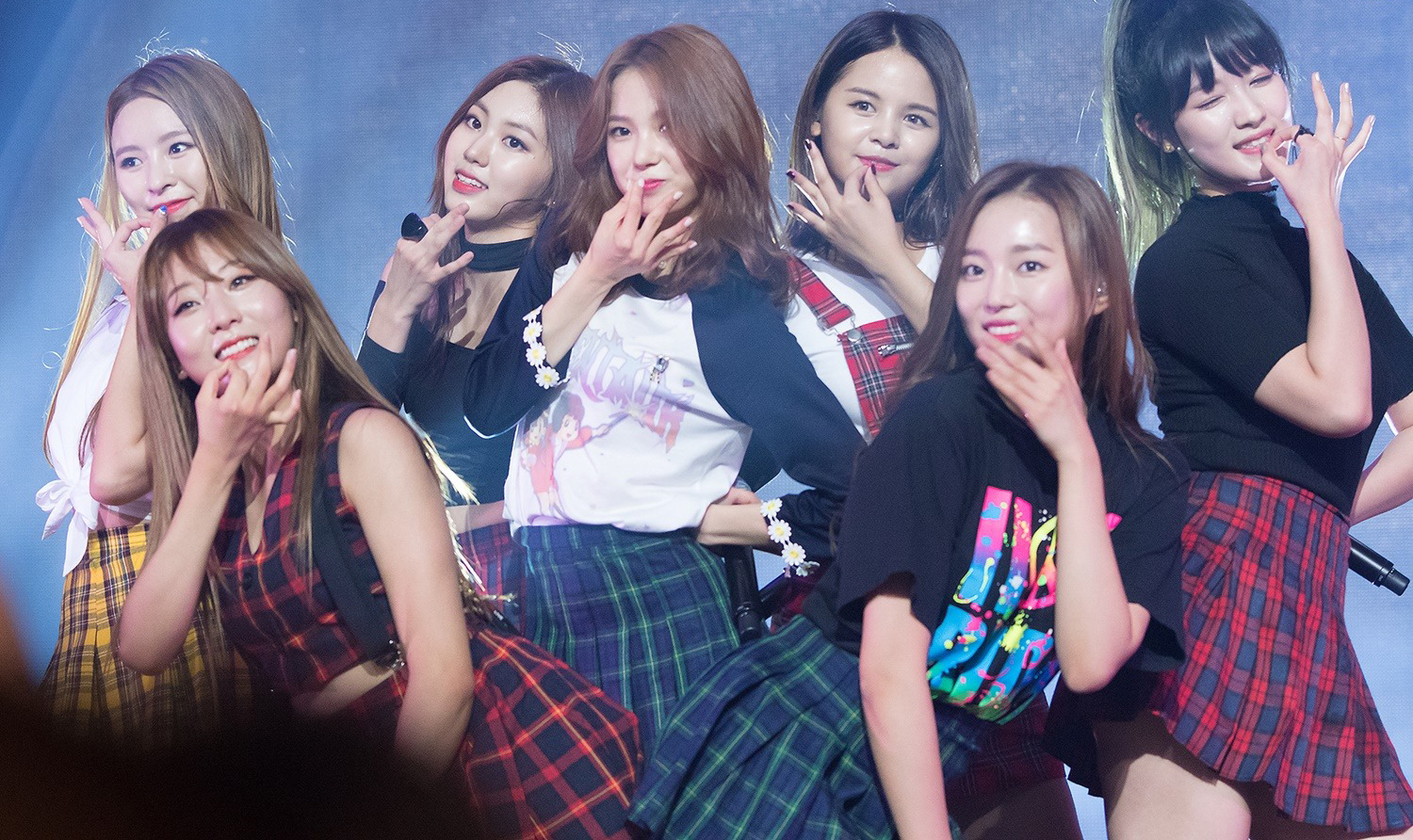
CLC debuted in 2015. The group is Cube's first multinational girl group.

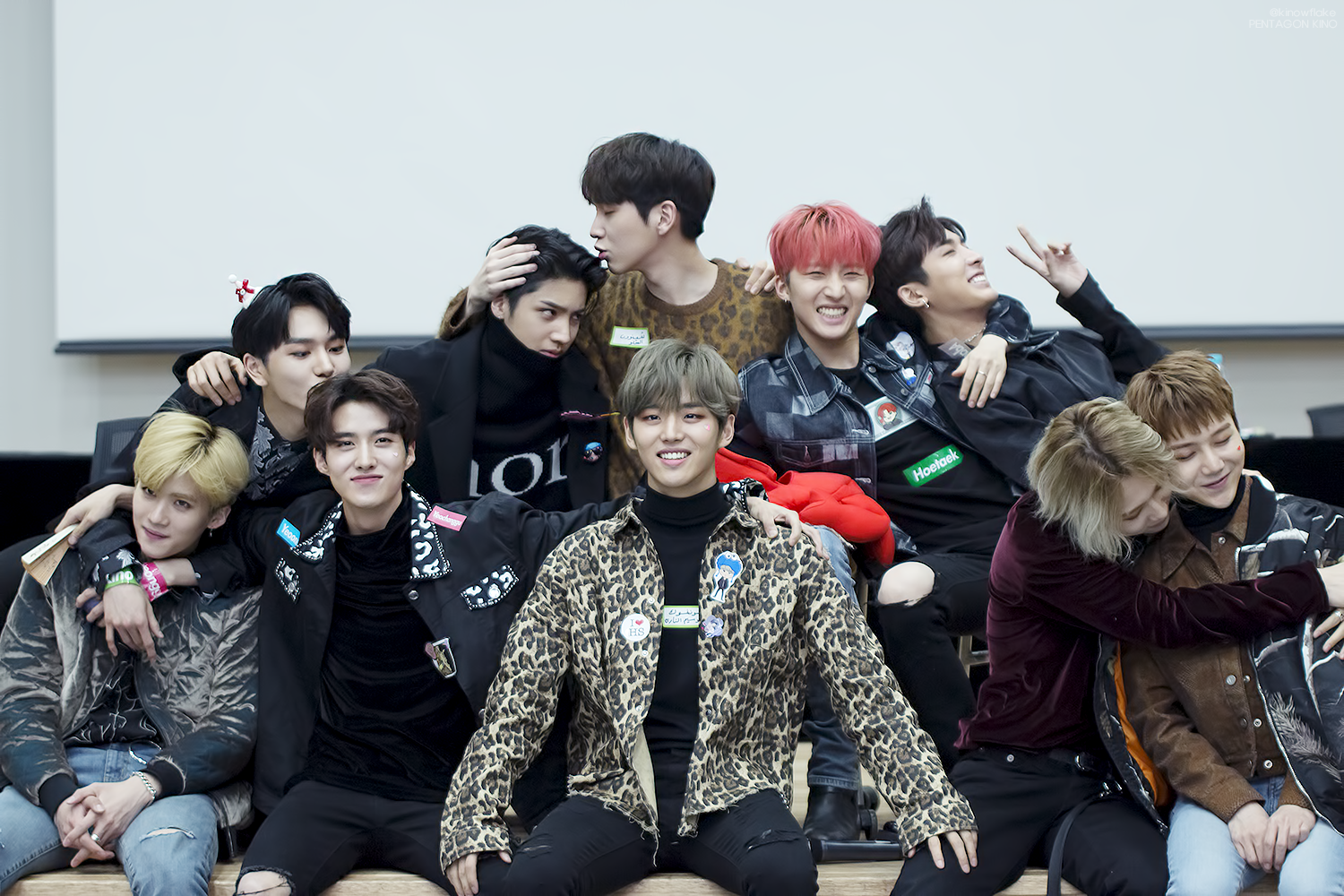
Pentagon debuted in 2016 and became Cube's first multinational boy group.

Cube's second girl group CLC debuted in March 2015. At the end of 2015, A Cube Entertainment, which manages Huh Gak and Apink, was acquired by its distributor, LOEN Entertainment. LOEN bought 70% shares in A Cube, therefore making it the sole owner of the agency. A Cube became a separate and distinct label under LOEN Entertainment with the new name Plan A Entertainment.

In February 2016, Cube headquarter located at Cheongdam-dong moved to Seongdong District near Seongdong station. In March 2016, Cube acquired Starline Entertainment as subsidiary. In June 2016, Cube's first girl group 4Minute disbanded. In July 2016, Cube Cafe was reopened in the new building called Cafe 20 Space: The Mint Universe. At the end of 2016, Shin Dae-nam was elected to be the new CEO of Cube Entertainment, replacing former CEO Park Chung-min. He was a former editor of the journal Ilgan Sports and president of Yedang Media. New boy group Pentagon debuted in October 2016. This was followed by Cube's third boy group after Beast leaving Cube in December 2016.

At the beginning of 2017, Universal Music sold their 8% stake in Cube. Following this, Cube Entertainment signed a distribution deal with Kakao M (formerly LOEN) for future music & content circulation. In March, Cube Entertainment reportedly facing a massive deficit after serious operating losses in 2016, the departure of flagship group BEAST, who reportedly made up 45 percent of their total sales and THAAD. In mid-2017, Cube's two male trainees Yoo Seon-ho and Lai Kuan-lin participated in Mnet's Produce 101 Season 2. The latter was chosen to be part of the final lineup for project boygroup Wanna One after finishing in 7th place, while Yoo Seon-ho finished in 17th place. Lai Kuan-lin debuted in Wanna One in August 2017, and promoted with the group until December 2018. Meanwhile, Jeon So-yeon, who participated in the first season of Produce 101 and Unpretty Rapstar debuted as a soloist in November 2017 with her song "Jelly". Jo Kwon of ballad group 2AM signed as a solo artist under the label in the same month, after staying for 16 years in JYP Entertainment. On November 14, Cube Entertainment released their third quarter earnings, with revenue growth of 15 percent from the second quarter 22 percent, largely due to the success of BtoB, HyunA and the growth of Pentagon and Yoo Seon-ho, video contents and other additional businesses. The same month, D’Live Co., the third-largest cable TV service provider that is seeking to sell its stakes in entertainment units iHQ Inc and Cube Entertainment Inc. Currently, D'Live owns a 45 percent stake in iHQ and a 30 percent in Cube Entertainment.

=== 2018–present: Fourth-generation artists, business expansion, U CUBE and changing of CEO ===
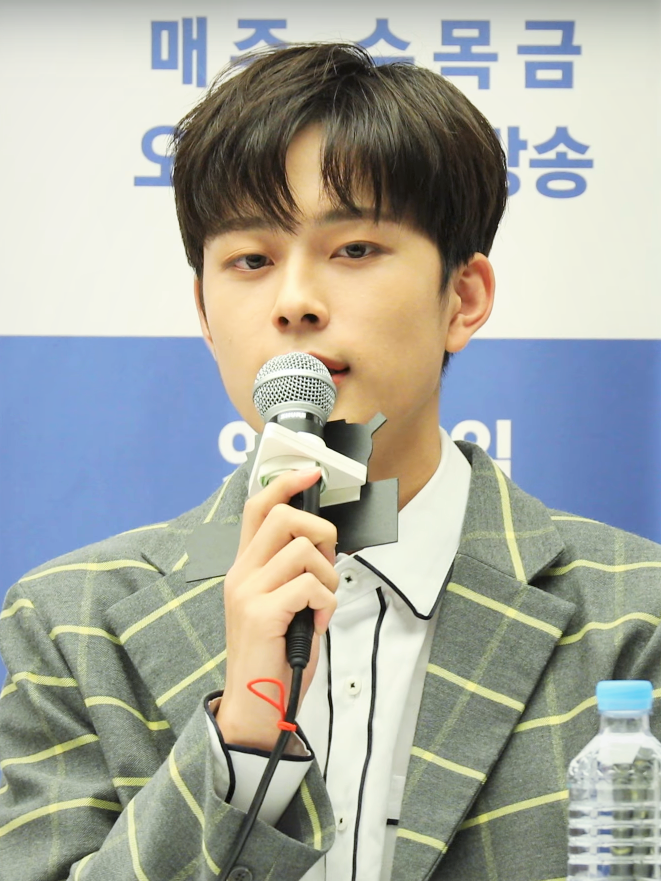
Yoo Seon-ho debuted in April, 2018

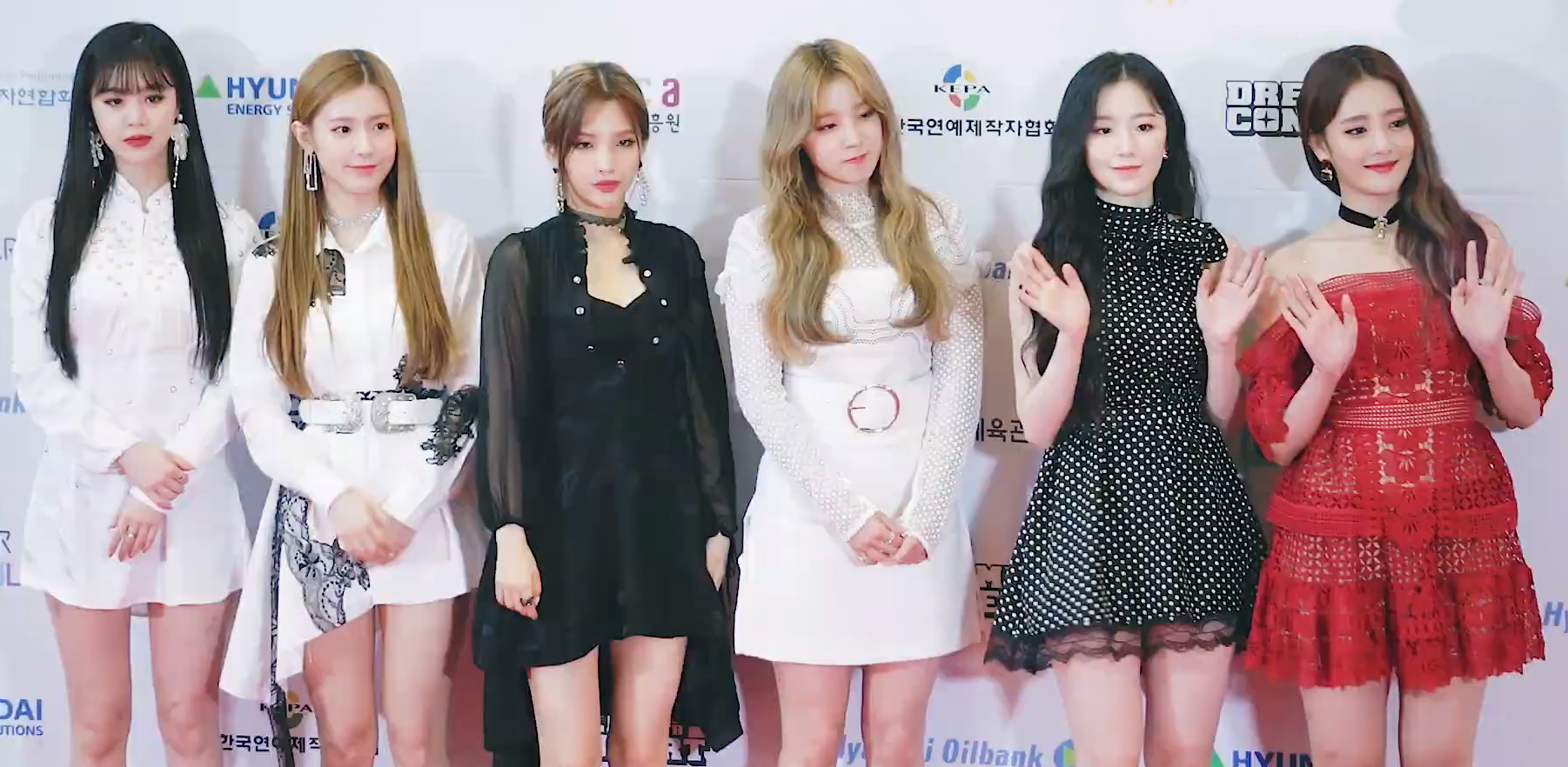
(G)I-dle debuted in May 2018. They became the fastest Cube artist to win #1 on music shows.

TV personality Lee Hwi-jae signed a contract with Cube on March 5, 2018. In a report released in April 2018, Cube said that it had successfully made profit in 2017, a welcome improvement after incurring severe losses in 2016. In April 2018, Yoo Seon-ho debuted as a soloist. On May 2, Cube debuted (G)I-dle, it is their third girl group after 4Minute and CLC. On May 4, Cube Entertainment announced the United Cube Concert – One concert, featuring their own artists. The concert took place at KINTEX in Ilsan on June 16 and was sold out in two minutes. On August 2, 2018, photos of Hyuna with Pentagon's E'Dawn at their birthday party on June 4 were released. Cube Entertainment initially denied rumors the two were dating, however Hyuna and E’Dawn held an interview with Yeonhap News later that day, admitting to their relationship which began in May 2016. The company responded to Hyuna's confirmation of the dating rumors by cancelling all previously planned performances for Triple H, on-air appearances, and fan events, including a fan meet-up scheduled for the next day. Fans were divided in reactions to the event, with some calling for E'Dawn to be removed from Pentagon, and others focusing on how the company treated them unfairly after releasing the scandal, rather than on their relationship. On September 13, Cube Entertainment announced that they would be terminating their contracts, citing that they could not "maintain trust" as a reason saying "After much deliberation, we've concluded that the trust between the company and the artists had been damaged to a degree that it cannot be restored, leading us to believe expulsion is necessary," in its official statement. However, Cube declared that the situation is still being considered and nothing has been decided yet for them, saying that the issue will be discussed on a board meeting. A senior official said, “The dismissal of Hyuna and E'Dawn was in discussion but not final. We will have to collect opinions a little more. As the artists' opinions are also important, this is a matter that should be decided carefully through collecting opinions. The departure is not final. Agency officials are having an urgent discussion. As much as possible, we will make decisions based on artists' opinions." On October 15, Cube Entertainment officially confirmed Hyuna's departure, announcing that the record label has reached an agreement with Hyuna to terminate her contract. On October 25, Cube signed a contract with Haohao Wenhua Media Company (Hot Idol, Haohao Bangyang Agency) (Chinese: 好好榜样) for activities in China. (Note: Cube Artist under Hot Idol are Yanan, Lai Kuan-lin, Yuqi and Shuhua.) On November 5, Cube debuted a non-idol ballad group, A Train To Autumn (Korean: 가을로 가는 기차; RR: Gaeullo Ganeun Gicha), with digital single "That Season You Were In". Kino of Pentagon participated as one of the lyricists. On November 14, Cube Entertainment officially confirmed E'Dawn's departure. On November 23, Cube established a new label, U-Cube, with Universal Music Japan for activities in Japan. It was reported that Cube's sales in 2018 increased 46.7% year-on-year to ₩35.8 billion. During the same period, operating profit jumped 809.3% to ₩1.9 billion and net profit turned to profit of ₩1 billion due to the success of BtoB's album sales and concerts, Pentagon's "Shine", (G)I-dle's debut and Lai Guan-lin's activities. Cube's music sales also increased by 58% to ₩8.8 billion due to the popularity of (G)I-dle's "Latata" and "Hann (一)".

In early 2019, Cube Entertainment chose NetEase Music as its strategic partner as a platform to promote in China. On January 23, D’Live Co. sought to sell its stakes in entertainment units iHQ Inc. and Cube Entertainment Inc. Currently, D’Live owns a 45 percent stake in iHQ and a 30 percent stake in Cube Entertainment. On August 19, Gagman Lee Sang-joon has signed an exclusive contract with Cube. Two days later, it was announced that Produce 48 participant, Han Cho-won and The Unit: Idol Rebooting Project, Lee Joo-hyun were the next to sign. In September, it was reported that Cube Entertainment partnership with e2PR, Strategic Communications for establishing new promotion team for handling (G)I-dle's public international relations. In the fourth quarter of 2019, Cube recorded 22.6 billion won and 40.3 million won in operating profit due to (G)I-dle's "Lion" and Pentagon's Prism World Tour. Overall, Cube's sales in 2019 down 13.9%, operating profit down 51.1% and net profit down 35.8% compared to previous years.

In early 2020, Comedian Park Mi-sun has signed an exclusive contract with Cube. On February 21, VT GMP reportedly has acquired 30.61% stake in Cube Entertainment, changing Cube's largest shareholder from iHQ to VT GMP, and plans on playing an active role in strengthening the business and pushing the Hallyu Wave through it subsidiary KVLY. On March 26, Shin Dae-nam has resigned as CEO of Cube Entertainment. Ahn Woo-hyung and Lee Dong-kwan was appointed as the new CEO of Cube Entertainment. Ahn Woo-hyung is the CEO of KVLY and Lee Dong-kwan is the VT GMP vice president. On April 17, Cube launched a global fan page U CUBE for fans around the world to communicate with their artists and providing services such as automatic translation in various languages and systems to apply for music show recordings. On June 16, 2020, model Moon Su-inn, who debuted as a model in 2014 signed exclusive contract with Cube Entertainment. On June 23, Seongdong-gu district signed an agreement with Cube to promote urban regeneration based on cultural contents through various cultural contents such as festival and YouTube content. On June 25, Cube partnered with VT GMP to launch a new global audition program titled, See Saw Game and is expected to air through Chinese streaming platforms. The audition program is developed by SBS' subsidiary Formattist Co., Ltd. and writer Park Won-woo of King of Mask Singer. On June 2, Cube signed an exclusive contract with Alibaba Group to support the activities of its artists in China. The artists of Cube will receive support from Alibaba for activities such as movies, dramas, advertisements, and performances in China. This is the first time that a Chinese IT company has signed an exclusive contract for artist activities with a Korean agency. In September 2020, Cube announced they co-hosted an event called, M.O.M (Message of the Moon) Project. It is a project to deliver messages of hope and wishes in the midst of the outbreak, as well as to launch a large artificial moon with the diameter of 12m and 20m high, and 21 small 2m diameter artificial moons and drive-in cinema at Salgoji Park, Seongdong-gu. On October 21, Cube has signed a strategic business agreement with Hanwha Life Insurance to increase brand awareness, strengthen marketing capabilities and developing new content. On December 31, 2020, Cube Entertainment announced that Ilhoon would leave BTOB after being investigated for using marijuana. Ilhoon was under investigation from the Seoul Metropolitan Police Agency for purchasing and using marijuana over the past 4–5 years, and was also charged for violating the Narcotics Control Act.

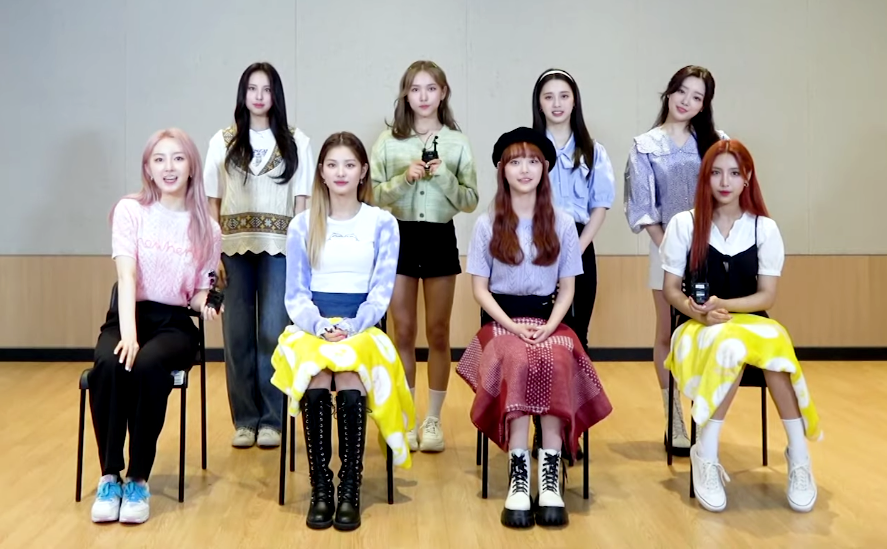
Lightsum debuted in June 2021, the company's first girl group in over three years

On January 6, 2021, Cube Entertainment announced that they had signed a contract with webtoon platform, Comics Family, to produce video content with their IP. The company plans to produce 12 exclusive video content on webtoon IPs per year with Comics Family. They are planning to distribute the dramas globally through various OTT platforms. On June 10, 2021, Cube Entertainment's fourth girl group, Lightsum, debuted. On August 3, 2021, Jang Hyun-seung left Cube Entertainment after his contract expired. On August 13, 2021, Choi Yu-jin of CLC made an unofficial announcement through Girls Planet 999 that Cube had told CLC that they would no longer be doing group activities. On August 14, 2021, Cube Entertainment announced Soojin's withdrawal from (G)I-dle after a school bullying accusation. On October 22, 2021, Choi Yujin of CLC successfully placed 3rd in the final live episode of Mnet's survival show Girls Planet 999, making her debut in the nine-member project group, Kep1er. On November 16, 2021, Cube Entertainment announced the departure of Sorn after her exclusive contract got terminated.

On March 5, 2022, Cube Entertainment announced that Soojin's exclusive contract has been terminated after police investigations concluded that the accusers were not guilty of spreading false information. On March 18, 2022, Cube Entertainment announced that Seungyeon and Yeeun would be leaving the company as they had chosen not to renew their contract with the company. On May 20, 2022, Cube Entertainment announced that CLC would be disbanding as of June 6 of that year. On October 25, 2022, Cube Entertainment announced the departure of members Huiyeon and Jian from the group and that Lightsum would be reorganized as a group of six.

On October 9, 2023, Cube Entertainment announced that Pentagon members' Yeo One, Yan An, Yuto, Kino, and Wooseok did not renew their contract with the agency. On November 6, after eleven years, the members of BTOB departed from Cube Entertainment following the completion of their contracts. The same day, Pentagon member Hongseok terminated his contract with the company.

On March 20, 2024, Cube Entertainment announced that Seunghee would be leaving the company as her contract had ended. On April 2, Cube debuted Nowadays, it is their fourth boy group after Beast, BtoB and Pentagon.

== Partnerships ==
=== Music distribution ===
Cube's records are distributed by the following:

- Kakao Entertainment (formerly Kakao M) (Overall)
- U-Cube, Universal Music Japan (Japan, etc)
- NetEase Music (China)
- Alibaba Group (China)

== Subsidiaries ==
=== Music Cube ===
Music Cube (뮤직큐브) was founded in Korea on August 18, 2005. It is an independently operated music copyright company that mainly engaged in the publishing, production, visual design and copyright management of music products. The headquarters is located in Nonhyeon-dong, Seoul.

Music Cube Japan is a Japanese subsidiary of Music Cube. It was founded in Japan on January 21, 2009. It is mainly engaged in the production, development, promotion and copyright management of music products. It is headquartered in Minato, Tokyo.

=== CUBE DC ===
Cube DC (큐브DC) was founded in 2012. It is a subsidiary of Cube Entertainment. The parent company Cube Entertainment announced on August 27, 2014, that it was acquired as a wholly owned subsidiary.

=== Cube Entertainment Japan ===
Cube Japan (Japanese: キューブジャパン) is an overseas subsidiary of Music Cube. It was founded in Japan in 2012 and is mainly responsible for the overseas promotion and distribution of parent company and related products. The headquarters is located in Minato-ku, Tokyo, and later operated by CUBE Entertainment JAPAN to operate Japanese activities.

Cube Entertainment Japan (CUBE ENTERTAINMENT JAPAN Co., Ltd.) is a local Japanese company owned by Cube Entertainment. It was founded in Japan on October 27, 2015. It is 100% owned by Cube Entertainment and has a capital of 96 million yen. It is responsible for direct planning and managing activities of the parent company artist in Japan. The headquarters is now located in Aoyama, Minato, Tokyo.

=== Starline Entertainment ===
Starline Entertainment (스타라인엔터테인먼트) On February 12, 2016, Park Sung-soo representatives reached an agreement with Cube Entertainment to become a wholly owned subsidiary of Cube Entertainment.

On July 18, 2017, the consolidated subsidiary Starline Entertainment.

=== Cube TV ===
Cube TV (큐브TV) was established on July 1, 2015, iHQ cooperates with Cube Entertainment, iHQ investment management channel, Cube provides the program content, is a channel dedicated to promoting K-POP culture, playing variety shows, singing Meeting and online drama. The channel includes BtoB's "Btob Show", CLC's "Seongdong-gu Resident", Pentagon's "Pentagon maker", Triple H's "Triple H Fun Agency ", online drama "Spark" and more.

Cube TV Hangtime In 2018, Cube Entertainment joined with Kiswe Mobile to create an application of 12 multi-view camera, "Cube TV Hangtime". This is an interactive mobile video which audience can interact with the artist. On June 16, Cube TV Hangtime app aired a four-hour-long of "United Cube Concert – One" for the audience who were unable to attend the concert.

=== U-Cube ===
On November 23, 2018, Cube Music and Universal Music Japan established U-Cube for overseas promotion and distribution of artists and related products.

== Philanthropy ==
Cube Entertainment artists teamed up with US major league team, Los Angeles Dodgers's Korean player Ryu Hyun-jin by donating all the profit from two collaboration songs to Hanbit School for the Blind.

In September 2015, the artists from the agency performed at the "Cube Festival" concert. The concert was hosted by Shanghai TV, Channel M, and BesTV. At a preceding press conference, a Cube representative said, "A while ago there was a heartbreaking accident in China. Beast, 4Minute, G.NA, BtoB, and CLC donated a portion of their earnings from their recent concert in Shanghai to the victims of the 2015 Tianjin explosions." Representing the concert organizer, Yeom Gyu Suk from Butterfly Media went on to explain, "While in the midst of preparing for the concert, the event sponsor and Cube Entertainment heard the news of the accident and decided to do the show for the victims, and after gathering the artists agreed."

In 2018, Cube Entertainment President Hong Seung-sung joined the Honor Society and gave a donation of more than ₩100 million for patients with rare incurable diseases. Hong Seung-sung, who has been suffering from Lou Gehrig's disease for the past 7 years, said, "As a person suffering from the same pain, I want to be a little push for children with rare diseases that need help." Over the years, it is common for United Cube to participate in the Ice Bucket Challenge, as a way to raise awareness for the disease.

In April 2019, according to the Disaster Relief Association, Cube Entertainment donated a total of ₩50 million to the Korean Committee to help those that were affected by the Sokcho Fire. On December 30, Cube delivered ₩10 million through Foundation for International Development Cooperation NGO for a child care facility in Seoul and a promised for monthly donation and volunteer activity.

On March 6, 2020, Cube and their artists donated ₩50 million through Hope Bridge National Disaster Relief Association to prevent the spreading of the COVID-19 pandemic in South Korea. The contribution will be used to support daily necessities, hygiene products and health goods for medical staff and families. In June, Cube Entertainment's parent company, VT GMP donated 10 million won worth of antibacterial paper bags for COVID-19 self-container sanitary kit.

== Philosophy ==
Cube Entertainment advocates their idols to become artist-type idols through writing, composing, and recording songs. They provide MIDI classes for their trainees and artists.

== Artists ==
All artists under Cube Entertainment are collectively known as United Cube.

=== Recording artists ===
==== Soloists ====
- Soyeon
- Yuqi
- Miyeon
- Minnie

==== Groups ====
- Pentagon
- I-dle
- Lightsum
- Nowz

==== Project Groups ====
- Station Young – Soyeon (with Red Velvet's Seulgi, Chungha and GFriend's SinB)
- K/DA – Soyeon and Miyeon (with Jaira Burns and Madison Beer)
- True Damage - Soyeon (with Becky G, Keke Palmer, Duckwrth and Thutmose)
- Super Five (다섯장) - Hui (with Astro's MJ, Ok Jin-wook, A.cian's Chu Hyeok-jin, and Park Hyeong-seok)

=== Actors ===
- Go Joon-hee (2025-present)
- Hwang Shin-hye (2025-present)
- Miyeon
- Minnie
- Moon Seungyou
- Moon Su-young
- Park Do-ha
- Kwon So-hyun
- Choi Sangyeob

=== Entertainers ===
- Kim Minjung

=== Studio artists ===
==== Singer-composer ====
- Shinwon
- Soyeon
- Minnie
- Yuqi
- Miyeon

==== Singer-lyricist ====
- Shinwon
- Soyeon
- Minnie
- Yuqi
- Miyeon
- Shuhua

==== In-house and guest composers ====
- Seo Jun-Sik (In-house)
- Jae Bin-Shin (Record and Mix engineer)
- Seo Jae-woo (Tenten Producing Team)
- BreadBeat (Tenten Producing Team)
- Seo Yong-bae (Tenten Producing Team)
- Bicksancho, Kim Tae-Ho (Yummy Tone Producing Team)
- Park Hae-il (Yummy Tone Producing Team)
- Choi Min-Soo (MosPick Music Producing Group)
- Jo Sung-ho (MosPick Music Producing Group)
- Son Young-jin (MosPick Music Producing Group)
- Kang Dong-ha (MosPick Music Producing Group)
- Im Sang-Hyuk
- Cho Sung-Hoon
- Noh Kyung-min
- Jeon Da-woon
- Choi Kyu-wan (DAVII)
- Jerry Lee
- Kwon Seok Hong
- Olivier Akos Castelli

==== Dance Team ====
- Star System, Dance Team (Long-term)
- team3dcolor, Dance Team (Guest)

== Former artists ==
- M4M (2013–2014)
- Oh Ye-ri (2013–2015)
- Rain (2013–2015)
- 4Minute (2009–2016)
  - Jihyun (2009–2016)
  - Gayoon (2009–2016)
  - Jiyoon (2009–2016)
  - Sohyun (2009–2016)
  - Hyuna (2009–2018)
- Beast (2009–2016)
  - Yoon Doo-joon (2009–2016)
  - Yang Yo-seob (2009–2016)
  - Lee Gi-kwang (2009–2016)
  - Son Dong-woon (2009–2016)
  - Yong Jun-hyung (2009–2016)
  - Jang Hyun-seung (2009–2021)
- BtoB (2012–2023)
  - Jung Il-hoon (2012–2020)
  - Seo Eun-kwang (2012–2023)
  - Lee Min-hyuk (2012–2023)
  - Lee Chang-sub (2012–2023)
  - Im Hyun-sik (2012–2023)
  - Peniel Shin (2012–2023)
  - Yook Sung-jae (2012–2023)
- Na In-woo (2012–2024)
- G.NA (2010–2016)
- Roh Ji-hoon (2011–2017)
- Trouble Maker (2011-2014)
- Kim Kiri (2012–2018)
- Shin Ji-hoon (2013–2017)
- Park Min-ha (2015–2017)
- Seo Woo (2016–2017)
- Choi Daehoon (2016–2017)
- CLC (2015–2022)
  - Yujin (2015–2022)
  - Sorn (2015–2021)
  - Elkie (2016–2021)
  - Seungyeon (2015–2022)
  - Yeeun (2015–2022)
  - Seunghee (2015–2024)
  - Kwon Eun-bin (2016–2026)
- Pentagon
  - E'Dawn (2016–2018)
  - Yeo One (2016–2023)
  - Yan An (2016–2023)
  - Yuto (2016–2023)
  - Kino (2016–2023)
  - Wooseok (2016–2023)
  - Hongseok (2016–2023)
  - Jinho (2016–2025)
  - Hui (2016–2025)
- Jo Woo-chan (2017–2019)
- Lai Kuan-lin (2017–2021)
- (G)I-dle
  - Soojin (2018–2021)
- A Train To Autumn (2018–2020) (Note: While no official disbandment was announced, A Train To Autumn's artist profile was removed in 2020, signifying the group is no longer active under the label.)
- Moon Su-in (2020–2023)
- Jo Kwon (2017–2024)
- Lee Hwi-jae (2018–?)
- Kim Kyung-ah
- Yoo Seon-ho (2017–2024)
- Lee Eun-ji (2021–2026)
- Park Mi-sun (2020–2026)
- Jung Ji-woo (2021–?)
- Choi Hee
- Kim Saerom
- Lee Sang-joon

== Discography ==
=== Projects ===
Title	Year	Artist	Album
"Fly So High"	2011	4Minute; Beast; G.NA	Fly So High
"Perfume"	2013	Yang Yo-seob; Cube Girls	Cube Voice Project Part 1
"Christmas Song" (크리스마스 노래)	2013	4Minute; Beast; G.NA; Roh Ji-hoon; Kim Kiri; BtoB; Shin Ji-hoon; Apink; Huh Gak	Cube Artist Christmas Song
"Smile Again"	2013	G.NA; Trouble Maker; Ryu Hyun-jin	Ryu-Cube Donation Project (류-큐브 기부 프로젝트)
"Back In The Day" (그때 그날처럼')	2014	Seo Eun-kwang	Cube Voice Project Part 2
"Small Moon"	2014	Heo Ga-yoon; Yang Yo-seob; Seo Eun-kwang; Shin Ji-hoon; Ryu Hyun-jin	Ryu-Cube Donation Project (류-큐브 기부 프로젝트)
"Special Christmas"	2016	Hyuna; Jang Hyun-seung; Roh Ji-hoon; BtoB; CLC; Pentagon	2016 United Cube Project Part 1
"Happy Winter Song" (겨울이 반가운 이유)	2016	Jinho; Hui	2016 United Cube Project Part 2
"Upgrade"	2018	Hyuna; Jo Kwon; BtoB; CLC; Pentagon; Yoo Seon-ho; (G)I-dle	ONE
"Follow Your Dreams" (한걸음)	2018	Hyuna; Jo Kwon; BtoB; CLC; Pentagon; Yoo Seon-ho; (G)I-dle	ONE
"Young & One"	2018	Hyuna; Jo Kwon; BtoB; CLC; Pentagon; Yoo Seon-ho; (G)I-dle	ONE
"Mermaid"	2018	Lee Min-hyuk; Peniel Shin; Jung Il-hoon; Jang Yeeun; Wooseok; Jeon So-yeon	ONE

== Filmography ==
=== Web drama ===
Key
†	Denotes web drama that have not yet been released

Year	Title	Original title	Network	Associated production	Notes	Ref.
2016	Spark	스파크	Naver TV	Co-produced with iHQ	12 episodes	
2021	Her Bucket List	그녀의 버킷리스트	KakaoTV	Co-produced with Kakao Entertainment, KVLY, and Studio Noum	Cine de drama (Note: It is a project which produces a movie version and a drama version of popular webtoons, simultaneously.)	
2021	Pumpkin Time	펌킨 타임	KakaoTV	Co-produced with Kakao Entertainment, KVLY, and Studio Noum	Cine de drama	
2021	Love & Wish †	러브 앤 위시	KakaoTV	Co-produced with Kakao Entertainment, KVLY, Studio Noum, and The Headliners	Cine de drama	

=== Variety show ===
Key
†	Denotes variety shows that have not yet been released

Year	Title	Original title	Network	Notes	Ref.
2020	Never Ending Neverland	네버엔딩 네버랜드	Cube TV	5 episodes	
2020	All That Cube	큐브 통신	Cube TV	16 episodes	
2020	Forest WE:TH Pentagon	포레스트 WE:TH 펜타곤	Cube TV	3 episodes	
2021	Steve JOBson	스티브 JOB손	Cube TV	1 episode	
	See Saw Game †				

== Concerts ==
- 2010 Cube Stars Party (August 10)
- 2011 Cube Stars Party (March 6)
- 2011 United Cube Concert: London, England (December 5), São Paulo, Brazil (December 13)
- 2013 United Cube Concert: Nanjing, China (January 26), Seoul, South Korea (February 2), and Yokohama, Japan (February 21)
- 2015 BesTV Channel-M Cube Festival (September 30)
- 2016 I Want Cube Pop in Macau (March 5)
- 2018 United Cube Concert – One (June 16)
- 2019 U & Cube Festival in Japan (March 23)

== Controversies ==
=== 2019: Contract ruled invalid for Lai Kuan-lin ===
On June 17, 2021, the Seoul Central District Court ruled in Lai Kaun-lin's favour and ended his contract with Cube Entertainment. This brought to a close a 2 year dispute that started in July 2019 when Lai requested to terminate his contract. One of the claims Lai made was that Cube Entertainment had sold his artist management rights in China to a third party without notifying him. The judge agreed with Lai and deemed the contract invalid. Lai also claimed Cube scheduled conflicting events that he could not attend and impersonated the signature of Lai Kuan-lin's father.

== Awards ==
Year presented, name of the award ceremony, award category, nominee(s) of the award and the result of the nomination
Year	Award	Category	Nominee(s)	Result
2010	Golden Disc Award	Producer Award	Hong Seung-sung	Won
2010	Golden Disc Award	Credit Award	Hong Seung-sung	Won
2011	Golden Disc Award	Producer Award	Hong Seung-sung	Won
2012	Gaon Chart Music Awards	K-pop Contribution Award / Lifetime Achievement Award	Hong Seung-sung	Won
2013	Golden Disc Award	Producer Award	Hong Seung-sung	Won
2017	Korea Drama Awards	Global Management Award	Hong Seung-sung	Won
2019	Child Diabetes Volunteer Award	Grand Prize	Hong Seung-sung	Won

== See also ==
- List of record labels
