= List of Loud contestants =

Loud is a South Korean reality television show where they form 2 boy groups: one under JYP Entertainment and another one under P Nation. The program involved 75 contestants from different countries with artistic talents competing for a spot in one of the 2 groups.

== Contestants ==
On May 6, the profile photos for J.Y. Park and Psy were revealed along with the premiere time, which would be on June 5 at 9 PM KST. On the same day, the first contestant, Daniel Jikal, was revealed through a teaser clip. On May 20, the other 74 contestants were revealed through teaser clips, including former 1the9 member, Lee Seung-hwan, and Mason Moon's brother, Maden Moon. On May 27, 2 contestants, Ham Mo-hyeob and Riku, left the program early due to their decision to withdraw from the program. As a result, the program would start with 73 contestants instead of the original 75.

Name	Hangul	Age (Note: Based on Korean age)	Nationality	Prior LOUD
Yoon Min	윤민	22	South Korea	Former Cube Entertainment trainee
Jo Min-ki	조민기	22	South Korea	
Kim Dae-hee	김대희	22	South Korea	
Lee Seung-hwan	이승환	22	South Korea	Former member of 1the9 and contestant of Under Nineteen; Former Play M Entertainment trainee
Zo Doo-hyun	조두현	22	South Korea	
Tatsunari	타츠나리	22	Japan	
Kim Min-hyuk	김민혁	22	South Korea	Former contestant of Dancing High
Kang Hyun-woo	강현우	22	South Korea	
Kim Hyun-soo	김현수	21	South Korea	
Kim Myung-kyu	김명규	21	South Korea	
Choi Soo-woong	최수웅	21	South Korea	
Ham Mo-hyeob (Note: Left before episode 1 due to his decision to withdraw from the program.)	함모협	21	South Korea	
Lee Su-jae	이수재	21	South Korea	
Song Joon-hyuk	송준혁	21	South Korea	
Shin Hae-in	신해인	21	South Korea	
Kim Do-young	김도영	21	South Korea	
Kwak Chan	곽찬	21	South Korea	
Park Hyeon-min	박현민	20	South Korea	
Choi Tae-hun	최태훈	20	South Korea	P Nation trainee; Former The Black Label trainee
Woo Kyung-jun	우경준	20	South Korea	P Nation trainee; Former Big Hit Entertainment trainee
Tsubasa	츠바사	20	Japan	
Kim Min-seo	김민서	20	South Korea	Former contestant on Produce X 101; Former Urban Works Media trainee
Nam Yun-seung (Note: Left before round 4 due to his decision to withdraw from the program.)	남윤승	20	South Korea	
Lee Kang-jun	이강준	20	South Korea	
Park Han-bin	박한빈	20	South Korea	Former SM Entertainment and Cube Entertainment trainee.
Ellery Hyun-bae	엘러리 현배	20	South Korea; United States	
Edward Park	에드워드 박	20	South Korea; United States	
Kim Tae-sung	김태성	19	South Korea	
Jang Hee-won	장희원	19	South Korea	
Lee Tae-geon	이태건	19	South Korea	
Kim Min-seoung	김민성	19	South Korea	
Jeong Tae-jin	정태진	19	South Korea	
Yoon Dong-yeon	윤동연	19	South Korea; Philippines	
Ahn Jae-ho	안재호	19	South Korea	
Jang Hyun-soo	장현수	19	South Korea	P Nation trainee; Former TS Entertainment trainee
Choi Jae-heum	최재흠	19	South Korea	
Park Yong-geon	박용건	19	South Korea	
Lim Kyoung-mun	임경문	19	South Korea	JYP Entertainment trainee
Kang Ha-yoon	강하윤	19	South Korea	
Kim Young-seok	김영석	19	South Korea	Former contestant of Under Nineteen; Former KQ Entertainment & Brand New Music trainee
Lee Sang-woon	이상운	19	South Korea	
Kim Joo-seong	김주성	19	South Korea	
Lee Ye-dam	이예담	19	South Korea	
Haruto Maeda	마에다 하루토	18	Japan	Musical child actor
Eun Hwi	은휘	18	South Korea	
Yoon Hwan	윤환	18	South Korea	
Kim Se-gon	김세곤	18	South Korea	
Kwon Yoo-seop	권유섭	18	South Korea	
Cheon Jun-hyeok	천준혁	18	South Korea	P Nation trainee
Lee Gye-hun	이계훈	18	South Korea	1st place in JYP's 12th Open Recruitment Audition of 2016; JYP Entertainment trainee
Jeon Gyu-min	전규민	18	South Korea	
Jeong Soo-min	정수민	18	South Korea; United States	
Daniel Jikal	다니엘 제갈	18	South Korea; Brazil; United States	Rapper
Lee Min-gyu	이민규	18	South Korea	Former JYP Entertainment trainee
Lee Tae-woo	이태우	17	South Korea	Child actor
Kim Seong-min	김성민	17	South Korea	
Amaru Mitsuyuki	미츠유키 아마루	17	Japan	JYP Entertainment trainee; Former YG Entertainment trainee
Do Min-kyu	도민규	17	South Korea	
Lin	린	17	Japan	
Oh Sung-jun	오성준	17	South Korea	P Nation trainee
Kim Hyun-jun	김현준	16	South Korea	
Keiju Okamoto	오카모토 케이주	16	Japan	Former contestant on Stage K
Justin Kim	저스틴 김	16	South Korea; United States	
Moon Hyeok-jun	문혁준	16	South Korea	
Riku	리쿠	15	Japan	
Kang Gie-mook	강기묵	15	South Korea	
Yang Seung-soo	양승수	15	South Korea	
Kim Jeong-min	김정민	15	South Korea	
Song Si-hyun	송시현	15	South Korea	
Lee Dong-hyeon	이동현	15	South Korea	
Kim Dong-hyun	김동현	14	South Korea	
Maden Moon	문 메이든	13	Canada; South Korea	Mason Moon's younger brother
Koki Tanaka	다나카 고키	13	Japan	
Hong Yeon-sung	홍연성	13	South Korea	
Na Yun-seo	나윤서	12	South Korea	

== Ranking ==
Color key

- Top 5 of the week
- Final members of JYP Entertainment's group
- Final members of P Nation's group TNX
- Eliminated in the final elimination round
- Eliminated in the seventh elimination round
- Eliminated in the sixth elimination round
- Eliminated in the fifth elimination round
- Eliminated in the fourth elimination round
- Eliminated in the third elimination round
- Eliminated in the second elimination round
- Left the program

Note: Voting was available on SuperStar (JYPNATION, P NATION, and The SuperStar). Only users with a Dalcom ID were eligible to vote. Voting opened immediately after each episode (starting from episode 3) and closed the day before the next episode at 11:59 PM KST. For the live rounds, the global fan poll was replaced with voting results at the end of each live round.

Name	Agency	Ranking												Final Rank
Name	Agency	Ep. 4	Ep. 5	Ep. 6	Ep. 7	Ep. 8	Ep. 9	Ep. 10	Ep. 11	Ep. 12	Ep. 13	Ep. 14	Ep. 15	Final Rank
Lee Gye-hun	JYP	1	1 (=)	1 (=)	1 (=)	1 (=)	1 (=)	2 (-1)	1 (+1)	1 (=)	9 (-8)	5 (+4)	1 (+4)	1
Woo Kyung-jun	P Nation	2	2 (=)	2 (=)	4 (-2)	4 (=)	5 (-1)	4 (+1)	4 (=)	4 (=)	10 (-6)	2 (+8)	6 (-4)	6
Lim Kyoung-mun	JYP	3	3 (=)	8 (-5)	7 (+1)	7 (=)	10 (-3)	9 (+1)	Eliminated					21
Cheon Jun-hyeok	P Nation	4	4 (=)	3 (+1)	2 (+1)	3 (-1)	4 (-1)	3 (+1)	2 (+1)	2 (=)	6 (-4)	8 (-2)	2 (+6)	2
Oh Sung-jun	P Nation	5	6 (-1)	4 (+2)	6 (-2)	8 (-2)	9 (-1)	10 (-1)	8 (+2)	6 (+2)	14 (-8)	4 (+10)	12 (-8)	12
Amaru Mitsuyuki	JYP	6	7 (-1)	5 (+2)	5 (=)	5 (=)	3 (+2)	5 (-2)	5 (=)	5 (=)	7 (-2)	9 (-2)	7 (+2)	7
Keiju Okamoto	JYP	7	5 (+2)	6 (-1)	3 (+3)	2 (+1)	2 (=)	1 (+1)	3 (-2)	3 (=)	1 (+2)	7 (-6)	3 (+4)	3
Choi Tae-hun	P Nation	8	9 (-1)	14 (-5)	12 (+2)	12 (=)	7 (+5)	6 (+1)	6 (=)	9 (-3)	2 (+7)	10 (-8)	10 (=)	10
Lee Dong-hyeon	JYP	9	8 (+1)	11 (-3)	10 (+1)	11 (-1)	11 (=)	11 (=)	10 (+1)	10 (=)	13 (-3)	3 (+10)	8 (-5)	8
Daniel Jikal	P Nation	10	10 (=)	9 (+1)	11 (-2)	9 (+2)	12 (-3)	12 (=)	12 (=)	11 (+1)	8 (+3)	Eliminated		13
Lee Ye-dam	P Nation	11	12 (-1)	16 (-4)	14 (+2)	15 (-1)	15 (=)	14 (+1)	14 (=)	14 (=)	Eliminated			16
Haruto Maeda	P Nation	12	13 (-1)	17 (-4)	16 (+1)	Eliminated								24
Koki Tanaka	P Nation	13	11 (+2)	10 (+1)	9 (+1)	10 (-1)	8 (+2)	8 (=)	9 (-1)	8 (+1)	4 (+4)	1 (+3)	4 (-3)	4
Kim Min-seoung	P Nation	14	16 (-2)	19 (-3)	17 (+2)	17 (=)	17 (=)	16 (+1)	Eliminated					20
Eun Hwi	P Nation	15	17 (-2)	7 (+10)	8 (-1)	6 (+2)	6 (=)	7 (–1)	7 (=)	7 (=)	11 (-4)	6 (+5)	5 (+1)	5
Kim Dae-hee	P Nation	16	Eliminated											32
Yoon Min	JYP	17	15 (+2)	13 (+2)	15 (-2)	13 (+2)	14 (-1)	15 (–1)	11 (+4)	13 (-2)	12 (+1)	11 (+1)	9 (+2)	9
Jang Hyun-soo	P Nation	18	14 (+4)	12 (+2)	13 (-1)	14 (-1)	13 (+1)	13 (=)	13 (=)	12 (+1)	5 (+7)	12 (-7)	11 (+1)	11
Kim Dong-hyun	P Nation	19	19 (=)	18 (+1)	18 (=)	16 (+2)	18 (-2)	19 (–1)	17 (+2)	Eliminated				17
Kang Hyun-woo	JYP	20	20 (=)	20 (=)	21 (-1)	18 (+3)	20 (-2)	20 (=)	18 (+2)	Eliminated				18
Song Si-hyun	JYP	21	Eliminated											34
Zo Doo-hyun	JYP	22	18 (+4)	21 (-3)	20 (+1)	19 (+1)	19 (=)	18 (+1)	15 (+3)	16 (-1)	3 (+13)	Eliminated		14
Hong Yeon-sung	P Nation	23	Eliminated											33
Nam Yun-seung	JYP	24	22 (+2)	22 (=)	Left the program									26
Ellery Hyun-bae	JYP	25	Eliminated											35
Kim Jeong-min	JYP	26	24 (+2)	24 (=)	22 (+2)	Eliminated								25
Kang Gie-mook	P Nation	27	Eliminated											31
Justin Kim	P Nation	28	25 (+3)	Eliminated										29
Na Yun-seo	JYP	29	21 (+8)	Eliminated										27
Moon Hyeok-jun	P Nation	30	23 (+7)	Eliminated										30
Yoon Dong-yeon	JYP	31	26 (+5)	15 (+11)	19 (-4)	20 (-1)	16 (+4)	17 (–1)	16 (+1)	15 (+1)	Eliminated			15
Park Yong-geon	JYP	32	30 (+2)	25 (+5)	24 (+1)	21 (+3)	21 (=)	22 (–1)	19 (+3)	Eliminated				19
Do Min-kyu	JYP	33	29 (+4)	23 (+6)	23 (=)	Eliminated								23
Lee Tae-woo	JYP	34	27 (+7)	Eliminated										28
Lee Su-jae	JYP	35	28 (+7)	26 (+2)	25 (+1)	22 (+3)	22 (=)	21 (+1)	Eliminated					22

== Rounds ==
=== Round 1: Skill and Charm Evaluations ===
Color key

JYP Entertainment trainee
P Nation trainee
Eliminated
Eliminated, but saved by JYP Entertainment
Eliminated, but saved by P Nation

Episode 1
Order	Contestant	Charm Stage	Skill Stage
1	Lee Dong-hyeon (이동현)	Read a poem while playing the piano to set the mood of the room.	Vocal (Justin Bieber – Love Yourself)
2	Eun Hwi (은휘)	Presented a PowerPoint presentation about his backstory and his dreams, including his first ever composed song "Space" and his recently composed song "Isn't This Too Much".	Rap & Composition (Do That S**t (Original Composition))
3	Zo Doo-hyun (조두현)	Performed a self-choreographed song with Kim Feel – Someday, The Boy (Itaewon Class OST) as the background music.	Vocal (Big Bang – Last Dance) + Dance (BTS – Dynamite)
4	Keiju Okamoto (오카모토 케이주)	Performed Hyojung (Oh My Girl) – Ottoke Song.	Dance (Justin Bieber – Intentions)
5	Koki Tanaka (다나카 고키)	Performed a coin magic trick.	Dance (Jacob Latimore feat. T-Pain – Heartbreak Heard Around The World) + (Playa Beats – Kill The Stage Anthem)
6	Daniel Jikal (다니엘 제갈)	Presented a self-produced short film titled "Go" with self-composed soundtrack "Ready to Go".	Rap (Feelin Alive (Original Rap))

Episode 2
Order	Contestant	Charm Stage	Skill Stage
1	Hong Yeon-sung (홍연성)	Performed a shadowboxing technique that was taught by his father & drew a self-made calligraphy about his father.	Dance (Rain – Rainism) + Vocal (Shin Seung-hun – I Believe)
2	Song Si-hyun (송시현)	Originally doing a guitar performance, he decided not to perform it.	Rap & Composition (Mire (Original Composition))
3	Haruto Maeda (마에다 하루토)	Performed a broadway style tap dance performance.	Dance (Pyotr Ilyich Tchaikovsky – Swan Lake Op.20) + (Beyoncé, Pharrell Williams, & Salatiel – Water)
4	JYP Trainees (Lee Gye-hun, Lim Kyoung-mun, & Amaru Mitsuyuki)		All Round (Dean – I'm Not Sorry)
5	P Nation Trainees (Jang Hyun-soo, Choi Tae-hun, Woo Kyung-jun, Cheon Jun-hyeok, & Oh Sung-jun)		All Round (Ateez – WIN)
6	Cheon Jun-hyeok (천준혁)	—N/a	Vocal (Bruno Mars – Versace on the Floor)
7	Woo Kyung-jun (우경준)	Acted like a weather reporter with an Australian accent and reported about the weather inside him.	Dance (Shawn Mendes & Justin Bieber – Monster)
8	Lee Gye-hun (이계훈)	Performed a shuffle routine about his daily life with Flo Rida – Whistle (DJSR Remix) as the background music.	Rap (Shooting Day (Original Rap)) + Dance (Lecrae & Andy Mineo – Coming in Hot) + (Imagine Dragons – Radioactive)

Episode 3
Order	Contestant	Charm Stage	Skill Stage
1	Oh Sung-jun (오성준)	Performed martial arts skills.	Vocal (Bumkey – Love) + Dance (Shawn Mendes – There's Nothing Holdin' Me Back)
2	Amaru Mitsuyuki (미츠유키 아마루)	Performed plate spinning with 2PM – 10 Out of 10 as the background music.	Vocal (Post Malone – Hollywood's Bleeding)
3	Moon Hyeok-jun (문혁준)	Performed a dance medley, which included Lee Seung-gi – Because You're My Woman, Shinee – Replay, & Jessi – Nun Nu Nan Na.	Dance (Seventeen – Mansae)
4	Nam Yun-seung (남윤승)	Performed a standard ballet routine, which included Grand Pirouette & Clint Mansell – A Swan Is Born (from Black Swan: Original Motion Picture Soundtrack).	Vocal (Roy Kim – Only Then)
5	Lee Ye-dam (이예담)	Introduced himself while playing football, where he kept the ball from touching the ground.	Dance (Eve – Who's That Girl?) + (EK – God God God)

Unaired contestants
Order	Contestant	Charm Stage	Skill Stage
1	Choi Tae-hun (최태훈)	—N/a	Dance (Jon Bellion – The Internet)
2	Lim Kyoung-mun (임경문)	—N/a	Vocal (Big Naughty feat. Jamie – Joker)
3	Yoon Min (윤민)	—N/a	Vocal (Blank (Original Composition))
4	Kang Hyun-woo (강현우)	—N/a	Vocal (Battery Dies (Original Composition))
5	Kim Dong-hyun (김동현)	—N/a	Rap (World Hip-Hop Travel (Original Composition))
6	Do Min-kyu (도민규)	—N/a	Composition (Charlie Chaplin (Original Composition))
7	Kim Min-seoung (김민성)	Performed a dance with 2PM – 10 Out of 10	Dance (Kai – Reason)
8	Kim Jeong-min (김정민)	—N/a	Dance (2PM – My House)
9	Park Yong-geon (박용건)	—N/a	Dance (Zico & Rain – Summer Hate)
10	Yoon Dong-yeon (윤동연)	Showed 4-cut manhwa.	Dance (Jungkook (BTS) – My Time)
11	Lee Su-jae (이수재)	—N/a	Dance (Shawn Mendes – Wonder)
12	Jang Hyun-soo (장현수)	—N/a	Rap (Woo Won-jae feat. Loco & Gray – 시차 (We Are))
13	Kang Gie-mook (강기묵)	—N/a	Dance (백호 (Baekho/White Tiger) – Self-made choreography) + (Billie Eilish – Therefore I Am)
14	Justin Kim (저스틴 김)	—N/a	Vocal (Sia – Snowman)
15	Ellery Hyun-bae (엘러리 현배)	—N/a	Dance (Masked Wolf – Astronaut in the Ocean)
16	Na Yun-seo (나윤서)	Performed Jay Park – Joah.	Dance (Lil Boi, Wonstein, Chillin Homie, & Skyminhyuk – FREAK (Prod. Slom))
17	Lee Tae-woo (이태우)	—N/a	Dance (Jason Derulo – Take You Dancing)
18	Kim Dae-hee (김대희)	—N/a	Vocal (Dean feat. Gaeko – D (Half Moon))

=== Round 2: Team Battle Evaluations ===
Color key

Winning team
Losing team
Safe and moves on to the third round
Nominated for elimination

No.	Team	Members	Individual Scores	Song	Original Artist	Team Score	Team Score	Original Artist	Song	Individual Scores	Members	Team
No.	JYP						P Nation					
1	Password 373 (비밀번호 373)	Lee Dong-hyeon	190	H.E.R	Block B	185	193	MOBB	Hit Me	190	Lee Gye-hun	Whispering Gyedam (여고계담)
1	Password 373 (비밀번호 373)	Lim Kyoung-mun	182	H.E.R	Block B	185	193	MOBB	Hit Me	184	Lee Ye-dam	Whispering Gyedam (여고계담)
2	Shrimp on the Floor (마룻바닥 위의 새우)	Amaru Mitsuyuki	184	Energetic	Wanna One	182	173	Ateez	Fireworks (I'm the One)	177	Choi Tae-hun	The East Invincible (동방불패)
2	Shrimp on the Floor (마룻바닥 위의 새우)	Lee Tae-woo	167	Energetic	Wanna One	182	173	Ateez	Fireworks (I'm the One)	162	Hong Yeon-sung	The East Invincible (동방불패)
3	Country Boys (컨트리 소년단)	Lee Su-jae	177	Black Swan	BTS	185	178	iKon	Killing Me	182	Haruto Maeda	Acorn Jelly (도토리묵)
3	Country Boys (컨트리 소년단)	Zo Doo-hyun	177	Black Swan	BTS	185	178	iKon	Killing Me	182	Haruto Maeda	Acorn Jelly (도토리묵)
3	Country Boys (컨트리 소년단)	Nam Yun-seung	171	Black Swan	BTS	185	178	iKon	Killing Me	166	Kang Gie-mook	Acorn Jelly (도토리묵)
4	The Big Ones (큼큼이들)	Yoon Dong-yeon	180	Going Crazy	Treasure	183	180	MCND	Crush	182	Moon Hyeok-jun	Three Meals a Day (삼시세끼)
4	The Big Ones (큼큼이들)	Oh Sung-jun	178	Going Crazy	Treasure	183	180	MCND	Crush	175	Keiju Okamoto	Three Meals a Day (삼시세끼)
5	Hungry Brothers (배고픈 형제들)	Koki Tanaka	185	God's Menu + What Type of X	Stray Kids + Jessi	191 (552(184))	191 (555(185))	Wanna One	Boomerang	192	Cheon Jun-hyeok	Megaphone (확성기)
5	Hungry Brothers (배고픈 형제들)	Na Yun-seo	181	God's Menu + What Type of X	Stray Kids + Jessi	191 (552(184))	191 (555(185))	Wanna One	Boomerang	176	Kim Min-seoung	Megaphone (확성기)
5	Hungry Brothers (배고픈 형제들)	Jang Hyun-soo	186	God's Menu + What Type of X	Stray Kids + Jessi	191 (552(184))	191 (555(185))	Wanna One	Boomerang	187	Yoon Min	Megaphone (확성기)
6	TWONS	Kim Jeong-min	169	Growl	Exo	175	170	Block B	NalinA	170	Woo Kyung-jun	Firestone (부싯돌)
6	TWONS	Park Yong-geon	174	Growl	Exo	175	170	Block B	NalinA	169	Kim Dae-hee	Firestone (부싯돌)
7	C-Boiz	Daniel Jikal	176	VVS	Miranni, Munchman, Khundi Panda, Mushvenom (Feat. Justhis)	170	188	Original Production	CCHILL	192	Eun Hwi	Mid-Siders
7	C-Boiz	Daniel Jikal	176	VVS	Miranni, Munchman, Khundi Panda, Mushvenom (Feat. Justhis)	170	188	Original Production	CCHILL	173	Justin Kim	Mid-Siders
7	C-Boiz	Song Si-hyun	165	VVS	Miranni, Munchman, Khundi Panda, Mushvenom (Feat. Justhis)	170	188	Original Production	CCHILL	174	Kim Dong-hyun	Mid-Siders
8	Dobaeromon (도배로몬)	Ellery Hyun-bae	N/A	Drawin'	Original Production	N/A	N/A	N/A	N/A	N/A	Kang Hyun-woo	N/A
8	Dobaeromon (도배로몬)	Do Min-kyu	N/A	Drawin'	Original Production	N/A	N/A	N/A	N/A	N/A	Kang Hyun-woo	N/A

==== Elimination Results ====
Color key

Safe
Eliminated

Rank	Contestant	Losing Team	Individual Score	Team Score	Total Score
1	Na Yun-seo	Hungry Brothers (배고픈 형제들)	181	191	372
2	Lim Kyoung-mun	Password 373 (비밀번호 373)	182	185	367
3	Keiju Okamoto	Three Meals a Day (삼시세끼)	175	180	355
4	Kang Gie-mook	Acorn Jelly (도토리묵)	166	178	344
5	Kim Dae-hee	Firestone (부싯돌)	169	170	339
6	Hong Yeon-sung	The East Invincible (동방불패)	162	173	335
7	Song Si-hyun	C-Boiz	165	170	335
8	Ellery Hyun-bae	Dobaeromon (도배로몬)	N/A	N/A	N/A

=== Round 3: JYP's Pick Evaluation ===
Color key

Highest score of the part and exempt from elimination
Lowest score of the part
Safe and moves on to the fourth round
Nominated for elimination

Part 1: Original Composition Battle
Order	Team Name	Team Score	Song	Production Credit	Contestant	Rank (Within Team)	Rank (Within Part)	Rank (Overall)
1	SNU-TOP (서울대탑)	100	Gaehwa (개화(開花))	Lyrics: Do Min-kyu, Lee Gye-hun, Lee Ye-jun (YOUTH), Lee Han-seul (Route49); Composition: Do Min-kyu, Lee Ye-jun (YOUTH), Lee Han-seul (Route49); Arrangement: Lee Ye-jun (YOUTH), Do Min-kyu, Lee Han-seul (Route49), Selah; Choreography: Lim Tae-ong, Lee Gye-hun	Lee Gye-hun	1	1	1
1	SNU-TOP (서울대탑)	100	Gaehwa (개화(開花))	Lyrics: Do Min-kyu, Lee Gye-hun, Lee Ye-jun (YOUTH), Lee Han-seul (Route49); Composition: Do Min-kyu, Lee Ye-jun (YOUTH), Lee Han-seul (Route49); Arrangement: Lee Ye-jun (YOUTH), Do Min-kyu, Lee Han-seul (Route49), Selah; Choreography: Lim Tae-ong, Lee Gye-hun	Oh Sung-jun	3	3	3
1	SNU-TOP (서울대탑)	100	Gaehwa (개화(開花))	Lyrics: Do Min-kyu, Lee Gye-hun, Lee Ye-jun (YOUTH), Lee Han-seul (Route49); Composition: Do Min-kyu, Lee Ye-jun (YOUTH), Lee Han-seul (Route49); Arrangement: Lee Ye-jun (YOUTH), Do Min-kyu, Lee Han-seul (Route49), Selah; Choreography: Lim Tae-ong, Lee Gye-hun	Do Min-kyu	2	2	2
2	Most Hyunt3d (현삼수배)	93	Coin	Lyrics: Kang Hyun-woo, Kim Dong-hyun; Composition: Kang Hyun-woo; Arrangement: Hotsauce, Kang Hyun-woo; Choreography: Park Kyung-seok, Jang Hyun-soo	Jang Hyun-soo	1	5	15
2	Most Hyunt3d (현삼수배)	93	Coin	Lyrics: Kang Hyun-woo, Kim Dong-hyun; Composition: Kang Hyun-woo; Arrangement: Hotsauce, Kang Hyun-woo; Choreography: Park Kyung-seok, Jang Hyun-soo	Kim Dong-hyun	2	6	16
2	Most Hyunt3d (현삼수배)	93	Coin	Lyrics: Kang Hyun-woo, Kim Dong-hyun; Composition: Kang Hyun-woo; Arrangement: Hotsauce, Kang Hyun-woo; Choreography: Park Kyung-seok, Jang Hyun-soo	Kang Hyun-woo	3	8	17
3	Random Box (랜덤박스)	91	Toy Story (언박싱(Unboxing))	Lyrics: Yoon Min, Eun Hwi, Daniel Jikal, Justin Kim; Composition: Yoon Min, Eun Hwi; Arrangement: Eun Hwi; Choreography: Lee Won-shin, Yoon Min	Yoon Min	2	9	22
3	Random Box (랜덤박스)	91	Toy Story (언박싱(Unboxing))	Lyrics: Yoon Min, Eun Hwi, Daniel Jikal, Justin Kim; Composition: Yoon Min, Eun Hwi; Arrangement: Eun Hwi; Choreography: Lee Won-shin, Yoon Min	Justin Kim	4	10	24
3	Random Box (랜덤박스)	91	Toy Story (언박싱(Unboxing))	Lyrics: Yoon Min, Eun Hwi, Daniel Jikal, Justin Kim; Composition: Yoon Min, Eun Hwi; Arrangement: Eun Hwi; Choreography: Lee Won-shin, Yoon Min	Daniel Jikal	1	4	21
3	Random Box (랜덤박스)	91	Toy Story (언박싱(Unboxing))	Lyrics: Yoon Min, Eun Hwi, Daniel Jikal, Justin Kim; Composition: Yoon Min, Eun Hwi; Arrangement: Eun Hwi; Choreography: Lee Won-shin, Yoon Min	Eun Hwi	3	7	23

Part 2: Dance Performance Battle
Order	Team Name	Team Score	Song	Original Artist	Production Credit	Contestant	Rank (Within Team)	Rank (Within Part)	Rank (Overall)
1	Young Mountain (영마운틴)	88	Obsession	Exo	Lyrics: Kenzie; Composition: Dem Jointz; Arrangement: Bush; Choreography: Yang Wook, Koki Tanaka	Koki Tanaka	1	4	28
1	Young Mountain (영마운틴)	88	Obsession	Exo	Lyrics: Kenzie; Composition: Dem Jointz; Arrangement: Bush; Choreography: Yang Wook, Koki Tanaka	Kim Jeong-min	3	11	30
1	Young Mountain (영마운틴)	88	Obsession	Exo	Lyrics: Kenzie; Composition: Dem Jointz; Arrangement: Bush; Choreography: Yang Wook, Koki Tanaka	Moon Hyeok-jun	2	9	29
2	Yong-Ke-Dam (용케담)	97	Dance Medley (Note: Individually performed, including AB6IX - "Close" performed by Keiju Okamoto, Baekhyun - "UN Village" performed by Park Yong-geon, & Uptown - "See You Again" performed by Lee Ye-dam.) + Oh My God (맙소사)	Hwangtaeji (G-Dragon, Taeyang, & Hwang Kwang-hee)	Lyrics: Teddy Park, G-Dragon; Composition: G-Dragon, Teddy Park; Arrangement: Bush; Choreography: Park Yong-geon, Lee Ye-dam, Keiju Okamoto, Park Kyung-seok	Park Yong-geon	3	7	9
2	Yong-Ke-Dam (용케담)	97	Dance Medley + Oh My God (맙소사)	Hwangtaeji (G-Dragon, Taeyang, & Hwang Kwang-hee)	Lyrics: Teddy Park, G-Dragon; Composition: G-Dragon, Teddy Park; Arrangement: Bush; Choreography: Park Yong-geon, Lee Ye-dam, Keiju Okamoto, Park Kyung-seok	Lee Ye-dam	2	3	8
2	Yong-Ke-Dam (용케담)	97	Dance Medley + Oh My God (맙소사)	Hwangtaeji (G-Dragon, Taeyang, & Hwang Kwang-hee)	Lyrics: Teddy Park, G-Dragon; Composition: G-Dragon, Teddy Park; Arrangement: Bush; Choreography: Park Yong-geon, Lee Ye-dam, Keiju Okamoto, Park Kyung-seok	Keiju Okamoto	1	1	7
3	Realist Team (현실주의 팀)	94	Zero for Conduct (품행제로)	Block B Bastarz	Lyrics: Zico, P.O; Composition: Zico, Poptime, Crush; Arrangement: Bush; Choreography: Yang Wook, Kim Min-seoung	Lee Su-jae	2	5	11
3	Realist Team (현실주의 팀)	94	Zero for Conduct (품행제로)	Block B Bastarz	Lyrics: Zico, P.O; Composition: Zico, Poptime, Crush; Arrangement: Bush; Choreography: Yang Wook, Kim Min-seoung	Kim Min-seoung	1	2	10
4	100°C	90	Fever	J.Y. Park (feat. Bibi & Superbee)	Lyrics: J.Y. Park, Superbee, Bibi; Composition: J.Y. Park; Arrangement: Selah; Choreography: Lee Won-shin, Haruto Maeda	Zo Doo-hyun	3	10	27
4	100°C	90	Fever	J.Y. Park (feat. Bibi & Superbee)	Lyrics: J.Y. Park, Superbee, Bibi; Composition: J.Y. Park; Arrangement: Selah; Choreography: Lee Won-shin, Haruto Maeda	Haruto Maeda	2	8	26
4	100°C	90	Fever	J.Y. Park (feat. Bibi & Superbee)	Lyrics: J.Y. Park, Superbee, Bibi; Composition: J.Y. Park; Arrangement: Selah; Choreography: Lee Won-shin, Haruto Maeda	Nam Yun-seung	1	6	25

Part 3: K-pop Idol Battle
Order	Team Name	Team Score	Song	Original Artist	Production Credit	Contestant	Rank (Within Team)	Rank (Within Part)	Rank (Overall)
1	Cider (사이다)	94	I Need U	BTS	Lyrics: "Hitman" Bang, RM, Suga, J-Hope, Brother Su; Composition: Pdogg; Arrangement: Kobee; Choreography: Lee Won-shin, Cheon Jun-hyeok, Yoon Dong-yeon	Yoon Dong-yeon	2	7	13
1	Cider (사이다)	94	I Need U	BTS	Lyrics: "Hitman" Bang, RM, Suga, J-Hope, Brother Su; Composition: Pdogg; Arrangement: Kobee; Choreography: Lee Won-shin, Cheon Jun-hyeok, Yoon Dong-yeon	Cheon Jun-hyeok	1	1	12
1	Cider (사이다)	94	I Need U	BTS	Lyrics: "Hitman" Bang, RM, Suga, J-Hope, Brother Su; Composition: Pdogg; Arrangement: Kobee; Choreography: Lee Won-shin, Cheon Jun-hyeok, Yoon Dong-yeon	Na Yun-seo	3	8	14
2	3PM	92	Only You	2PM	Lyrics: Park Jin-young, Woo Kyung-jun; Composition: Bang Si-hyuk; Arrangement: Versachoi; Choreography: Oh Myung-suk	Lee Tae-woo	3	9	20
2	3PM	92	Only You	2PM	Lyrics: Park Jin-young, Woo Kyung-jun; Composition: Bang Si-hyuk; Arrangement: Versachoi; Choreography: Oh Myung-suk	Lim Kyoung-mun	2	6	19
2	3PM	92	Only You	2PM	Lyrics: Park Jin-young, Woo Kyung-jun; Composition: Bang Si-hyuk; Arrangement: Versachoi; Choreography: Oh Myung-suk	Woo Kyung-jun	1	5	18
3	National Voice (국대보이스)	97	Airplane	iKon	Lyrics: B.I, Bobby, Choi Tae-hun, Amaru Mitsuyuki, Lee Dong-hyeon; Composition: B.I, Future Bounce; Arrangement: Kobee; Choreography: Kim Hyun-seung	Lee Dong-hyeon	1	2	4
3	National Voice (국대보이스)	97	Airplane	iKon	Lyrics: B.I, Bobby, Choi Tae-hun, Amaru Mitsuyuki, Lee Dong-hyeon; Composition: B.I, Future Bounce; Arrangement: Kobee; Choreography: Kim Hyun-seung	Choi Tae-hun	3	4	6
3	National Voice (국대보이스)	97	Airplane	iKon	Lyrics: B.I, Bobby, Choi Tae-hun, Amaru Mitsuyuki, Lee Dong-hyeon; Composition: B.I, Future Bounce; Arrangement: Kobee; Choreography: Kim Hyun-seung	Amaru Mitsuyuki	2	3	5

==== Elimination Results ====
Color key

Safe
Nominee
Eliminated
Saved by Psy

Category	Team	Members	Result (for nominees)
Creative Music	Random Box (랜덤박스)	Yoon Min	—N/a
Creative Music	Random Box (랜덤박스)	Justin Kim	Eliminated
Creative Music	Random Box (랜덤박스)	Daniel Jikal	—N/a
Creative Music	Random Box (랜덤박스)	Eun Hwi	—N/a
Idol Group	3PM	Lee Tae-woo	Eliminated
Idol Group	3PM	Lim Kyoung-mun	—N/a
Idol Group	3PM	Woo Kyung-jun	—N/a
Idol Group	Cider (사이다)	Yoon Dong-yeon	—N/a
Idol Group	Cider (사이다)	Cheon Jun-hyeok	—N/a
Idol Group	Cider (사이다)	Na Yun-seo	Eliminated
Creative Dance	Young Mountain (영마운틴)	Koki Tanaka	—N/a
Creative Dance	Young Mountain (영마운틴)	Kim Jeong-min	Safe
Creative Dance	Young Mountain (영마운틴)	Moon Hyeok-jun	Eliminated
Creative Dance	100°C	Zo Doo-hyun	Safe
Creative Dance	100°C	Haruto Maeda	—N/a
Creative Dance	100°C	Nam Yun-seung	—N/a

=== Round 4: Psy's Pick Evaluation ===
Color key

Highest score of the part and exempt from elimination
Lowest score of the part
Safe and moves on to the fifth round
Nominated for elimination

Part 1: Original Composition Battle
Order	Team Name	Team Score	Song	Production Credit	Contestant	Rank
1	Countdown (카운트다운)	90	Ring Ring (Note: Remake of iKon – "Bling Bling".)	Opening: Do Min-kyu, Park Yong-geon, Oh Sung-jun, Haruto Maeda; Lyrics: B.I, Bobby, Millennium; Composition: B.I, Millennium; Arrangement: Do Min-kyu; Choreography: B.B Trippin', Park Yong-geon, Haruto Maeda; Choreography Director: B.B Trippin', Kim Yoon (P Nation)	Do Min-kyu	3
1	Countdown (카운트다운)	90	Ring Ring	Opening: Do Min-kyu, Park Yong-geon, Oh Sung-jun, Haruto Maeda; Lyrics: B.I, Bobby, Millennium; Composition: B.I, Millennium; Arrangement: Do Min-kyu; Choreography: B.B Trippin', Park Yong-geon, Haruto Maeda; Choreography Director: B.B Trippin', Kim Yoon (P Nation)	Oh Sung-jun	2
1	Countdown (카운트다운)	90	Ring Ring	Opening: Do Min-kyu, Park Yong-geon, Oh Sung-jun, Haruto Maeda; Lyrics: B.I, Bobby, Millennium; Composition: B.I, Millennium; Arrangement: Do Min-kyu; Choreography: B.B Trippin', Park Yong-geon, Haruto Maeda; Choreography Director: B.B Trippin', Kim Yoon (P Nation)	Park Yong-geon	1
1	Countdown (카운트다운)	90	Ring Ring	Opening: Do Min-kyu, Park Yong-geon, Oh Sung-jun, Haruto Maeda; Lyrics: B.I, Bobby, Millennium; Composition: B.I, Millennium; Arrangement: Do Min-kyu; Choreography: B.B Trippin', Park Yong-geon, Haruto Maeda; Choreography Director: B.B Trippin', Kim Yoon (P Nation)	Haruto Maeda	4
2	Veteran (베테랑)	95	Actor (배우)	Lyrics: Yoon Min, Cheon Jun-hyeok, Daniel Jikal, Kim Dong-hyun; Composition: Daniel Jikal, Yoon Min, Cheon Jun-hyeok; Arrangement: Daniel Jikal, Yoo Gun-hyung, bayb; Choreography: Yoo Seung-hyun (Team Same); Choreography Director: Yoo Seung-hyun (Team Same), Kim Yoon (P Nation)	Daniel Jikal	1
2	Veteran (베테랑)	95	Actor (배우)	Lyrics: Yoon Min, Cheon Jun-hyeok, Daniel Jikal, Kim Dong-hyun; Composition: Daniel Jikal, Yoon Min, Cheon Jun-hyeok; Arrangement: Daniel Jikal, Yoo Gun-hyung, bayb; Choreography: Yoo Seung-hyun (Team Same); Choreography Director: Yoo Seung-hyun (Team Same), Kim Yoon (P Nation)	Cheon Jun-hyeok	2
2	Veteran (베테랑)	95	Actor (배우)	Lyrics: Yoon Min, Cheon Jun-hyeok, Daniel Jikal, Kim Dong-hyun; Composition: Daniel Jikal, Yoon Min, Cheon Jun-hyeok; Arrangement: Daniel Jikal, Yoo Gun-hyung, bayb; Choreography: Yoo Seung-hyun (Team Same); Choreography Director: Yoo Seung-hyun (Team Same), Kim Yoon (P Nation)	Kim Dong-hyun	4
2	Veteran (베테랑)	95	Actor (배우)	Lyrics: Yoon Min, Cheon Jun-hyeok, Daniel Jikal, Kim Dong-hyun; Composition: Daniel Jikal, Yoon Min, Cheon Jun-hyeok; Arrangement: Daniel Jikal, Yoo Gun-hyung, bayb; Choreography: Yoo Seung-hyun (Team Same); Choreography Director: Yoo Seung-hyun (Team Same), Kim Yoon (P Nation)	Yoon Min	3
3	Seoul Landings (서울상륙작전)	96	Safety Pin (안전핀 (땡겨))	Lyrics: Kang Hyun-woo, Eun Hwi, Lee Su-jae, Lim Kyoung-mun; Composition: Eun Hwi, Kang Hyun-woo; Arrangement: Eun Hwi; Choreography: B.B Trippin', Kang Hyun-woo, Lee Su-jae; Choreography Director: B.B Trippin', Kim Yoon (P Nation)	Lim Kyoung-mun	2
3	Seoul Landings (서울상륙작전)	96	Safety Pin (안전핀 (땡겨))	Lyrics: Kang Hyun-woo, Eun Hwi, Lee Su-jae, Lim Kyoung-mun; Composition: Eun Hwi, Kang Hyun-woo; Arrangement: Eun Hwi; Choreography: B.B Trippin', Kang Hyun-woo, Lee Su-jae; Choreography Director: B.B Trippin', Kim Yoon (P Nation)	Eun Hwi	1
3	Seoul Landings (서울상륙작전)	96	Safety Pin (안전핀 (땡겨))	Lyrics: Kang Hyun-woo, Eun Hwi, Lee Su-jae, Lim Kyoung-mun; Composition: Eun Hwi, Kang Hyun-woo; Arrangement: Eun Hwi; Choreography: B.B Trippin', Kang Hyun-woo, Lee Su-jae; Choreography Director: B.B Trippin', Kim Yoon (P Nation)	Kang Hyun-woo	3
3	Seoul Landings (서울상륙작전)	96	Safety Pin (안전핀 (땡겨))	Lyrics: Kang Hyun-woo, Eun Hwi, Lee Su-jae, Lim Kyoung-mun; Composition: Eun Hwi, Kang Hyun-woo; Arrangement: Eun Hwi; Choreography: B.B Trippin', Kang Hyun-woo, Lee Su-jae; Choreography Director: B.B Trippin', Kim Yoon (P Nation)	Lee Su-jae	4

Part 2: K-pop Group Battle
Order	Team Name	Team Score	Song	Original Artist	Production Credit	Contestant	Rank
1	SATTALA (사딸라)	88	Dalla Dalla (달라달라) X New Face	Itzy X Psy	Intro: FUNNY (Kim Jae-young, Gong Yumadang, CC BY); Lyrics: Galactika, Athena, Psy; Composition: Galactika, Psy, Yoo Gun-hyung; Arrangement: Star Wars (별들의 전쟁 (Galactika)), Woo Bin, CLYDE, OGI; Choreography: B.B Trippin', Lee Ye-dam, Jang Hyun-soo; Choreography Director: B.B Trippin', Kim Yoon (P Nation)	Kim Jeong-min	4
1	SATTALA (사딸라)	88	Dalla Dalla (달라달라) X New Face	Itzy X Psy	Intro: FUNNY (Kim Jae-young, Gong Yumadang, CC BY); Lyrics: Galactika, Athena, Psy; Composition: Galactika, Psy, Yoo Gun-hyung; Arrangement: Star Wars (별들의 전쟁 (Galactika)), Woo Bin, CLYDE, OGI; Choreography: B.B Trippin', Lee Ye-dam, Jang Hyun-soo; Choreography Director: B.B Trippin', Kim Yoon (P Nation)	Jang Hyun-soo	3
1	SATTALA (사딸라)	88	Dalla Dalla (달라달라) X New Face	Itzy X Psy	Intro: FUNNY (Kim Jae-young, Gong Yumadang, CC BY); Lyrics: Galactika, Athena, Psy; Composition: Galactika, Psy, Yoo Gun-hyung; Arrangement: Star Wars (별들의 전쟁 (Galactika)), Woo Bin, CLYDE, OGI; Choreography: B.B Trippin', Lee Ye-dam, Jang Hyun-soo; Choreography Director: B.B Trippin', Kim Yoon (P Nation)	Lee Ye-dam	1
1	SATTALA (사딸라)	88	Dalla Dalla (달라달라) X New Face	Itzy X Psy	Intro: FUNNY (Kim Jae-young, Gong Yumadang, CC BY); Lyrics: Galactika, Athena, Psy; Composition: Galactika, Psy, Yoo Gun-hyung; Arrangement: Star Wars (별들의 전쟁 (Galactika)), Woo Bin, CLYDE, OGI; Choreography: B.B Trippin', Lee Ye-dam, Jang Hyun-soo; Choreography Director: B.B Trippin', Kim Yoon (P Nation)	Keiju Okamoto	2
2	P-Dar-Nation (피다른네이션)	97	Shock	Beast	Lyrics: Lee Yang-ho, Lee Sang-ho, Yong Jun-hyung; Composition: Shinsadong Tiger, Lee Sang-ho; Arrangement: Yoo Gun-hyung, SPACE ONE; Choreography: B.B Trippin', Zo Doo-hyun, Amaru Mitsuyuki; Choreography Director: B.B Trippin', Kim Yoon (P Nation)	Amaru Mitsuyuki	2
2	P-Dar-Nation (피다른네이션)	97	Shock	Beast	Lyrics: Lee Yang-ho, Lee Sang-ho, Yong Jun-hyung; Composition: Shinsadong Tiger, Lee Sang-ho; Arrangement: Yoo Gun-hyung, SPACE ONE; Choreography: B.B Trippin', Zo Doo-hyun, Amaru Mitsuyuki; Choreography Director: B.B Trippin', Kim Yoon (P Nation)	Lee Dong-hyeon	3
2	P-Dar-Nation (피다른네이션)	97	Shock	Beast	Lyrics: Lee Yang-ho, Lee Sang-ho, Yong Jun-hyung; Composition: Shinsadong Tiger, Lee Sang-ho; Arrangement: Yoo Gun-hyung, SPACE ONE; Choreography: B.B Trippin', Zo Doo-hyun, Amaru Mitsuyuki; Choreography Director: B.B Trippin', Kim Yoon (P Nation)	Zo Doo-hyun	4
2	P-Dar-Nation (피다른네이션)	97	Shock	Beast	Lyrics: Lee Yang-ho, Lee Sang-ho, Yong Jun-hyung; Composition: Shinsadong Tiger, Lee Sang-ho; Arrangement: Yoo Gun-hyung, SPACE ONE; Choreography: B.B Trippin', Zo Doo-hyun, Amaru Mitsuyuki; Choreography Director: B.B Trippin', Kim Yoon (P Nation)	Woo Kyung-jun	1
3	Highfive (하이파이브)	96	10 Out of 10 (10점 만점에 10점)	2PM	Lyrics: J.Y. Park; Composition: J.Y. Park; Arrangement: Yoo Gun-hyung; Choreography: B.B Trippin', Lee Gye-hun, Kim Min-seoung, Koki Tanaka, Choi Tae-hun, Yoon Dong-yeon; Choreography Director: B.B Trippin', Kim Yoon (P Nation)	Choi Tae-hun	2
3	Highfive (하이파이브)	96	10 Out of 10 (10점 만점에 10점)	2PM	Lyrics: J.Y. Park; Composition: J.Y. Park; Arrangement: Yoo Gun-hyung; Choreography: B.B Trippin', Lee Gye-hun, Kim Min-seoung, Koki Tanaka, Choi Tae-hun, Yoon Dong-yeon; Choreography Director: B.B Trippin', Kim Yoon (P Nation)	Kim Min-seoung	5
3	Highfive (하이파이브)	96	10 Out of 10 (10점 만점에 10점)	2PM	Lyrics: J.Y. Park; Composition: J.Y. Park; Arrangement: Yoo Gun-hyung; Choreography: B.B Trippin', Lee Gye-hun, Kim Min-seoung, Koki Tanaka, Choi Tae-hun, Yoon Dong-yeon; Choreography Director: B.B Trippin', Kim Yoon (P Nation)	Koki Tanaka	1
3	Highfive (하이파이브)	96	10 Out of 10 (10점 만점에 10점)	2PM	Lyrics: J.Y. Park; Composition: J.Y. Park; Arrangement: Yoo Gun-hyung; Choreography: B.B Trippin', Lee Gye-hun, Kim Min-seoung, Koki Tanaka, Choi Tae-hun, Yoon Dong-yeon; Choreography Director: B.B Trippin', Kim Yoon (P Nation)	Yoon Dong-yeon	4
3	Highfive (하이파이브)	96	10 Out of 10 (10점 만점에 10점)	2PM	Lyrics: J.Y. Park; Composition: J.Y. Park; Arrangement: Yoo Gun-hyung; Choreography: B.B Trippin', Lee Gye-hun, Kim Min-seoung, Koki Tanaka, Choi Tae-hun, Yoon Dong-yeon; Choreography Director: B.B Trippin', Kim Yoon (P Nation)	Lee Gye-hun	3

==== Elimination Results ====
Color key

Safe
Nominee
Eliminated
Saved by Park Jin-young

Category	Team	Members	Result (for nominees)
Creative Music	Countdown (카운트다운)	Do Min-kyu	Eliminated
Creative Music	Countdown (카운트다운)	Haruto Maeda	Eliminated
Creative Music	Countdown (카운트다운)	Oh Sung-jun	—N/a
Creative Music	Countdown (카운트다운)	Park Yong-geon	—N/a
Creative Music	Veteran (베테랑)	Daniel Jikal	—N/a
Creative Music	Veteran (베테랑)	Kim Dong-hyun	Safe
Creative Music	Veteran (베테랑)	Cheon Jun-hyeok	—N/a
Creative Music	Veteran (베테랑)	Yoon Min	—N/a
K-pop Group	SATTALA (사딸라)	Lee Ye-dam	—N/a
K-pop Group	SATTALA (사딸라)	Jang Hyun-soo	Safe
K-pop Group	SATTALA (사딸라)	Kim Jeong-min	Eliminated
K-pop Group	SATTALA (사딸라)	Keiju Okamoto	—N/a
K-pop Group	Highfive (하이파이브)	Choi Tae-hun	—N/a
K-pop Group	Highfive (하이파이브)	Kim Min-seoung	Safe
K-pop Group	Highfive (하이파이브)	Koki Tanaka	—N/a
K-pop Group	Highfive (하이파이브)	Yoon Dong-yeon	—N/a
K-pop Group	Highfive (하이파이브)	Lee Gye-hun	—N/a

=== Round 5: Casting Evaluation ===
Color key

First voting region
Second voting region
Third voting region
Scouted by JYP Entertainment
Scouted by P Nation
Scouted by both companies, but chose JYP Entertainment
Scouted by both companies, but chose P Nation
Nominated for elimination

Group No.	Members	Voting Rank	Song	Original Artist	Casting Card
1	Kim Dong-hyun	17th	Pirate (해적)	Original Production	Yes
1	Lee Su-jae	22nd	Miroh	Stray Kids	No
1	Eun Hwi	12th	Beast Mode	Original Production	Yes
1	Daniel Jikal	10th	Ready to Stay	Original Production	Yes
1	Koki Tanaka	9th	Boy in Luv (상남자)	BTS	No
1	Lim Kyoung-mun	7th	Breathe	AB6IX	No
1	Cheon Jun-hyeok	3rd	Beautiful	Wanna One	Yes
2	Park Yong-geon	21st	Tempo	Exo	Yes
2	Zo Doo-hyun	19th	Candy	Baekhyun	Yes
2	Kang Hyun-woo	20th	Mint Choco (민트초코)	Original Production	No
2	Yoon Min	15th	One Way (일방통행)	Original Production	Yes
2	Lee Ye-dam	14th	Be Responsible (책임져)	Untitle	Yes
2	Oh Sung-jun	6th	In the Rain (빗속에서)	Lee Moon-sae	Yes
2	Amaru Mitsuyuki	5th	D (Half Moon)	Dean	Yes
2	Woo Kyung-jun	2nd	Good Boy	GD X Taeyang	Yes
3	Yoon Dong-yeon	18th	Burn It Up (활활)	Wanna One	Yes
3	Kim Min-seoung	16th	Say My Name	Ateez	No
3	Jang Hyun-soo	13th	Red Sun	Hangzoo	No
3	Choi Tae-hun	11th	Baby, Don't Cry (인어의 눈물)	Exo	Yes
3	Lee Dong-hyeon	8th	90's Love	NCT U	Yes
3	Keiju Okamoto	4th	Mmmh (음)	Kai	Yes
3	Lee Gye-hun	1st	Money	Dawn	Yes

==== Casting Results ====
JYP Entertainment
Park Yong-geon	Zo Doo-hyun	Yoon Min	Amaru Mitsuyuki	Yoon Dong-yeon
Lee Dong-hyeon	Keiju Okamoto	Lee Gye-hun	Kang Hyun-woo	
P Nation
Kim Dong-hyun	Eun Hwi	Daniel Jikal	Cheon Jun-hyeok	Lee Ye-dam
Oh Sung-jun	Woo Kyung-jun	Choi Tae-hun	Jang Hyun-soo	Koki Tanaka

==== Elimination Results ====
Color key

Eliminated
Saved by JYP Entertainment
Saved by P Nation

Group	Nominees	Result
1	Lee Su-jae	Eliminated
1	Koki Tanaka	Safe
1	Lim Kyoung-mun	Eliminated
2	Kang Hyun-woo	Safe
3	Kim Min-seoung	Eliminated
3	Jang Hyun-soo	Safe

=== Live Rounds ===
Color key

Winning team
Losing team
Eliminated
Eliminated, but saved by wildcard

Note: The members are listed from oldest to youngest according to the official website.

Round 6: Identity, Same Song, and Crossover Evaluations
JYP					P Nation				
Members	Individual Votes	Songs	Original Artists	Team Votes (Note: Team votes are calculated by adding the total votes from the evaluations. Formula: Evaluation 1 Votes + Evaluation 2 Votes.)	Team Votes	Original Artists	Songs	Individual Votes	Members
Kang Hyun-woo	49,834	Again & Again + 10 Minutes (Note: Performed by Kang Hyun-woo, Zo Doo-hyun, Yoon Min, and Lee Dong-hyeon.) + About Romance (낭만에 대하여) X Idol (Note: Performed by Lee Gye-hun, Keiju Okamoto, Amaru Mitsuyuki, Park Yong-geon, and Yoon Dong-yeon.)	2PM + Lee Hyo-ri + Choi Baek-ho X BTS	85,245	130,626	Jessi + Lee Hyo-ri + Exo X N.EX.T	I'm Your Brother (난 네 Brother) (Note: Remake of Nunu Nana.) + 10 Minutes (Note: Performed by Oh Sung-jun, Lee Ye-dam, Woo Kyung-jun, Daniel Jikal, and Kim Dong-hyun.) + Growl (으르렁) X Lazenca, Save Us (Note: Performed by Choi Tae-hun, Jang Hyun-soo, Cheon Jun-hyeok, Eun Hwi, and Koki Tanaka.)	173,510	Woo Kyung-jun
Zo Doo-hyun	59,373	Again & Again + 10 Minutes + About Romance (낭만에 대하여) X Idol	2PM + Lee Hyo-ri + Choi Baek-ho X BTS	85,245	130,626	Jessi + Lee Hyo-ri + Exo X N.EX.T	I'm Your Brother (난 네 Brother) + 10 Minutes + Growl (으르렁) X Lazenca, Save Us	121,403	Choi Tae-hun
Yoon Min	86,304	Again & Again + 10 Minutes + About Romance (낭만에 대하여) X Idol	2PM + Lee Hyo-ri + Choi Baek-ho X BTS	85,245	130,626	Jessi + Lee Hyo-ri + Exo X N.EX.T	I'm Your Brother (난 네 Brother) + 10 Minutes + Growl (으르렁) X Lazenca, Save Us	82,190	Lee Ye-dam
Park Yong-geon	40,130	Again & Again + 10 Minutes + About Romance (낭만에 대하여) X Idol	2PM + Lee Hyo-ri + Choi Baek-ho X BTS	85,245	130,626	Jessi + Lee Hyo-ri + Exo X N.EX.T	I'm Your Brother (난 네 Brother) + 10 Minutes + Growl (으르렁) X Lazenca, Save Us	88,633	Jang Hyun-soo
Yoon Dong-yeon	69,381	Again & Again + 10 Minutes + About Romance (낭만에 대하여) X Idol	2PM + Lee Hyo-ri + Choi Baek-ho X BTS	85,245	130,626	Jessi + Lee Hyo-ri + Exo X N.EX.T	I'm Your Brother (난 네 Brother) + 10 Minutes + Growl (으르렁) X Lazenca, Save Us	107,219	Daniel Jikal
Lee Gye-hun	194,914	Again & Again + 10 Minutes + About Romance (낭만에 대하여) X Idol	2PM + Lee Hyo-ri + Choi Baek-ho X BTS	85,245	130,626	Jessi + Lee Hyo-ri + Exo X N.EX.T	I'm Your Brother (난 네 Brother) + 10 Minutes + Growl (으르렁) X Lazenca, Save Us	181,925	Cheon Jun-hyeok
Amaru Mitsuyuki	159,977	Again & Again + 10 Minutes + About Romance (낭만에 대하여) X Idol	2PM + Lee Hyo-ri + Choi Baek-ho X BTS	85,245	130,626	Jessi + Lee Hyo-ri + Exo X N.EX.T	I'm Your Brother (난 네 Brother) + 10 Minutes + Growl (으르렁) X Lazenca, Save Us	124,963	Eun Hwi
Keiju Okamoto	179,275	Again & Again + 10 Minutes + About Romance (낭만에 대하여) X Idol	2PM + Lee Hyo-ri + Choi Baek-ho X BTS	85,245	130,626	Jessi + Lee Hyo-ri + Exo X N.EX.T	I'm Your Brother (난 네 Brother) + 10 Minutes + Growl (으르렁) X Lazenca, Save Us	127,435	Oh Sung-jun
Lee Dong-hyeon	112,533	Again & Again + 10 Minutes + About Romance (낭만에 대하여) X Idol	2PM + Lee Hyo-ri + Choi Baek-ho X BTS	85,245	130,626	Jessi + Lee Hyo-ri + Exo X N.EX.T	I'm Your Brother (난 네 Brother) + 10 Minutes + Growl (으르렁) X Lazenca, Save Us	61,763	Kim Dong-hyun
					130,626	Jessi + Lee Hyo-ri + Exo X N.EX.T	I'm Your Brother (난 네 Brother) + 10 Minutes + Growl (으르렁) X Lazenca, Save Us	122,428	Koki Tanaka

Round 7: Billboard, School Concept, and Girl Group Evaluations
JYP					P Nation				
Members	Individual Votes	Songs	Original Artists	Team Votes	Team Votes	Original Artists	Songs	Individual Votes	Members
Zo Doo-hyun	39,701	Bad Guy + School Life (Note: Performed by Lee Gye-hun, Keiju Okamoto, Zo Doo-hyun, Yoon Dong-yeon, and Lee Dong-hyeon.) + Peek-a-Boo (Note: Performed by Lee Dong-hyeon, Keiju Okamoto, Yoon Min, Amaru Mitsuyuki, and Lee Gye-hun.)	Billie Eilish + Stray Kids + Red Velvet	104,195	134,760	Camila Cabello + BTS + Girls' Generation	Havana (Note: Performed by Choi Tae-hun, Woo Kyung-jun, Daniel Jikal, Eun Hwi, Oh Sung-jun, and Jang Hyun-soo.) + No More Dream (Note: Performed by Woo Kyung-jun, Cheon Jun-hyeok, Koki Tanaka, Eun Hwi, Lee Ye-dam, Choi Tae-hun, and Daniel Jikal.) + Run Devil Run (Note: Performed by Choi Tae-hun, Oh Sung-jun, Cheon Jun-hyeok, Woo Kyung-jun, Koki Tanaka, Jang Hyun-soo, and Lee Ye-dam.)	31,944	Woo Kyung-jun
Yoon Min	30,434	Bad Guy + School Life + Peek-a-Boo	Billie Eilish + Stray Kids + Red Velvet	104,195	134,760	Camila Cabello + BTS + Girls' Generation	Havana + No More Dream + Run Devil Run	43,660	Choi Tae-hun
Yoon Dong-yeon	39,143	Bad Guy + School Life + Peek-a-Boo	Billie Eilish + Stray Kids + Red Velvet	104,195	134,760	Camila Cabello + BTS + Girls' Generation	Havana + No More Dream + Run Devil Run	36,592	Lee Ye-dam
Lee Gye-hun	33,667	Bad Guy + School Life + Peek-a-Boo	Billie Eilish + Stray Kids + Red Velvet	104,195	134,760	Camila Cabello + BTS + Girls' Generation	Havana + No More Dream + Run Devil Run	37,965	Jang Hyun-soo
Amaru Mitsuyuki	34,593	Bad Guy + School Life + Peek-a-Boo	Billie Eilish + Stray Kids + Red Velvet	104,195	134,760	Camila Cabello + BTS + Girls' Generation	Havana + No More Dream + Run Devil Run	34,011	Daniel Jikal
Keiju Okamoto	44,684	Bad Guy + School Life + Peek-a-Boo	Billie Eilish + Stray Kids + Red Velvet	104,195	134,760	Camila Cabello + BTS + Girls' Generation	Havana + No More Dream + Run Devil Run	37,345	Cheon Jun-hyeok
Lee Dong-hyeon	25,855	Bad Guy + School Life + Peek-a-Boo	Billie Eilish + Stray Kids + Red Velvet	104,195	134,760	Camila Cabello + BTS + Girls' Generation	Havana + No More Dream + Run Devil Run	30,695	Eun Hwi
					134,760	Camila Cabello + BTS + Girls' Generation	Havana + No More Dream + Run Devil Run	23,642	Oh Sung-jun
					134,760	Camila Cabello + BTS + Girls' Generation	Havana + No More Dream + Run Devil Run	39,557	Koki Tanaka

Round 8: Fan's Choice and Retro K-pop Evaluations (Special Guests: Hyuna and 3Racha (Stray Kids' Bang Chan, Changbin, and Han))
JYP					P Nation				
Members	Individual Votes	Songs	Original Artists	Team Votes	Team Votes	Original Artists	Songs	Individual Votes	Members
Zo Doo-hyun	28,917	Love Me or Leave Me + You In Vague Memory (흐린 기억 속의 그대) + Back Door (Note: Special collaboration stage.)	Day6 + Hyun Jin-young + Stray Kids	75,464	63,407	X1 + Songgolmae + Hyuna	Move (움직여) + A Chance Encounter (어쩌다 마주친 그대) + I'm Not Cool	45,412	Woo Kyung-jun
Yoon Min	32,719	Love Me or Leave Me + You In Vague Memory (흐린 기억 속의 그대) + Back Door	Day6 + Hyun Jin-young + Stray Kids	75,464	63,407	X1 + Songgolmae + Hyuna	Move (움직여) + A Chance Encounter (어쩌다 마주친 그대) + I'm Not Cool	33,576	Choi Tae-hun
Lee Gye-hun	43,360	Love Me or Leave Me + You In Vague Memory (흐린 기억 속의 그대) + Back Door	Day6 + Hyun Jin-young + Stray Kids	75,464	63,407	X1 + Songgolmae + Hyuna	Move (움직여) + A Chance Encounter (어쩌다 마주친 그대) + I'm Not Cool	26,362	Jang Hyun-soo
Amaru Mitsuyuki	36,299	Love Me or Leave Me + You In Vague Memory (흐린 기억 속의 그대) + Back Door	Day6 + Hyun Jin-young + Stray Kids	75,464	63,407	X1 + Songgolmae + Hyuna	Move (움직여) + A Chance Encounter (어쩌다 마주친 그대) + I'm Not Cool	29,506	Daniel Jikal
Keiju Okamoto	40,014	Love Me or Leave Me + You In Vague Memory (흐린 기억 속의 그대) + Back Door	Day6 + Hyun Jin-young + Stray Kids	75,464	63,407	X1 + Songgolmae + Hyuna	Move (움직여) + A Chance Encounter (어쩌다 마주친 그대) + I'm Not Cool	37,874	Cheon Jun-hyeok
Lee Dong-hyeon	44,726	Love Me or Leave Me + You In Vague Memory (흐린 기억 속의 그대) + Back Door	Day6 + Hyun Jin-young + Stray Kids	75,464	63,407	X1 + Songgolmae + Hyuna	Move (움직여) + A Chance Encounter (어쩌다 마주친 그대) + I'm Not Cool	42,700	Eun Hwi
					63,407	X1 + Songgolmae + Hyuna	Move (움직여) + A Chance Encounter (어쩌다 마주친 그대) + I'm Not Cool	44,242	Oh Sung-jun
					63,407	X1 + Songgolmae + Hyuna	Move (움직여) + A Chance Encounter (어쩌다 마주친 그대) + I'm Not Cool	48,387	Koki Tanaka

==== Results ====
Rank	Agency	Contestant	Votes
1	P Nation	Koki Tanaka	48,387
2	P Nation	Woo Kyung-jun	45,412
3	JYP	Lee Dong-hyeon	44,726
4	P Nation	Oh Sung-jun	44,242
5	JYP	Lee Gye-hun	43,360
6	P Nation	Eun Hwi	42,700
7	JYP	Keiju Okamoto	40,014
8	P Nation	Cheon Jun-hyeok	37,874
9	JYP	Amaru Mitsuyuki	36,299
10	P Nation	Choi Tae-hun	33,576
11	JYP	Yoon Min	32,719
12	P Nation	Jang Hyun-soo	26,362

=== Special Stage: Dream Debut ===
Producer Crossover
Order	Group	Song	Original Artist	Production Credit	Members
1	JYP	Champion	Psy	Lyrics: Psy; Composition: Psy; Arrangement: Lee Hae-sol; Choreography: Born Black	Yoon Min
1	JYP	Champion	Psy	Lyrics: Psy; Composition: Psy; Arrangement: Lee Hae-sol; Choreography: Born Black	Lee Gye-hun
1	JYP	Champion	Psy	Lyrics: Psy; Composition: Psy; Arrangement: Lee Hae-sol; Choreography: Born Black	Amaru Mitsuyuki
1	JYP	Champion	Psy	Lyrics: Psy; Composition: Psy; Arrangement: Lee Hae-sol; Choreography: Born Black	Keiju Okamoto
1	JYP	Champion	Psy	Lyrics: Psy; Composition: Psy; Arrangement: Lee Hae-sol; Choreography: Born Black	Lee Dong-hyeon
2	P Nation	Behind You (너의 뒤에서)	J.Y. Park	Lyrics: J.Y. Park, Kim Hyeong-seok; Composition: Kim Hyeong-seok; Arrangement: $$AM, Tenzo (Papermaker); Choreography: Team Same, Kim Yoon (P Nation)	Woo Kyung-jun
2	P Nation	Behind You (너의 뒤에서)	J.Y. Park	Lyrics: J.Y. Park, Kim Hyeong-seok; Composition: Kim Hyeong-seok; Arrangement: $$AM, Tenzo (Papermaker); Choreography: Team Same, Kim Yoon (P Nation)	Choi Tae-hun
2	P Nation	Behind You (너의 뒤에서)	J.Y. Park	Lyrics: J.Y. Park, Kim Hyeong-seok; Composition: Kim Hyeong-seok; Arrangement: $$AM, Tenzo (Papermaker); Choreography: Team Same, Kim Yoon (P Nation)	Jang Hyun-soo
2	P Nation	Behind You (너의 뒤에서)	J.Y. Park	Lyrics: J.Y. Park, Kim Hyeong-seok; Composition: Kim Hyeong-seok; Arrangement: $$AM, Tenzo (Papermaker); Choreography: Team Same, Kim Yoon (P Nation)	Cheon Jun-hyeok
2	P Nation	Behind You (너의 뒤에서)	J.Y. Park	Lyrics: J.Y. Park, Kim Hyeong-seok; Composition: Kim Hyeong-seok; Arrangement: $$AM, Tenzo (Papermaker); Choreography: Team Same, Kim Yoon (P Nation)	Eun Hwi
2	P Nation	Behind You (너의 뒤에서)	J.Y. Park	Lyrics: J.Y. Park, Kim Hyeong-seok; Composition: Kim Hyeong-seok; Arrangement: $$AM, Tenzo (Papermaker); Choreography: Team Same, Kim Yoon (P Nation)	Oh Sung-jun
2	P Nation	Behind You (너의 뒤에서)	J.Y. Park	Lyrics: J.Y. Park, Kim Hyeong-seok; Composition: Kim Hyeong-seok; Arrangement: $$AM, Tenzo (Papermaker); Choreography: Team Same, Kim Yoon (P Nation)	Koki Tanaka

Debut Single
Order	Group	Song	Production Credit	Members
1	TBA (JYP)	Get Loud	Lyrics: J.Y. Park, Yoon Min, Lee Gye-hun; Composition: J.Y. Park, Kyler Niko; Arrangement: J.Y. Park, Lee Hae-sol; Choreography: JYP Purdy Team, Yoon Jin-woo	Yoon Min
1	TBA (JYP)	Get Loud	Lyrics: J.Y. Park, Yoon Min, Lee Gye-hun; Composition: J.Y. Park, Kyler Niko; Arrangement: J.Y. Park, Lee Hae-sol; Choreography: JYP Purdy Team, Yoon Jin-woo	Lee Gye-hun
1	TBA (JYP)	Get Loud	Lyrics: J.Y. Park, Yoon Min, Lee Gye-hun; Composition: J.Y. Park, Kyler Niko; Arrangement: J.Y. Park, Lee Hae-sol; Choreography: JYP Purdy Team, Yoon Jin-woo	Amaru Mitsuyuki
1	TBA (JYP)	Get Loud	Lyrics: J.Y. Park, Yoon Min, Lee Gye-hun; Composition: J.Y. Park, Kyler Niko; Arrangement: J.Y. Park, Lee Hae-sol; Choreography: JYP Purdy Team, Yoon Jin-woo	Keiju Okamoto
1	TBA (JYP)	Get Loud	Lyrics: J.Y. Park, Yoon Min, Lee Gye-hun; Composition: J.Y. Park, Kyler Niko; Arrangement: J.Y. Park, Lee Hae-sol; Choreography: JYP Purdy Team, Yoon Jin-woo	Lee Dong-hyeon
2	TNX (P Nation)	180 Seconds (180초)	Lyrics: Penomeco, Damian; Composition: Yoo Gun-hyung, Penomeco; Arrangement: Yoo Gun-hyung; Choreography: B.B Trippin', Kim Yoon (P Nation), Just Jerk, Choi Tae-hun	Woo Kyung-jun
2	TNX (P Nation)	180 Seconds (180초)	Lyrics: Penomeco, Damian; Composition: Yoo Gun-hyung, Penomeco; Arrangement: Yoo Gun-hyung; Choreography: B.B Trippin', Kim Yoon (P Nation), Just Jerk, Choi Tae-hun	Choi Tae-hun
2	TNX (P Nation)	180 Seconds (180초)	Lyrics: Penomeco, Damian; Composition: Yoo Gun-hyung, Penomeco; Arrangement: Yoo Gun-hyung; Choreography: B.B Trippin', Kim Yoon (P Nation), Just Jerk, Choi Tae-hun	Jang Hyun-soo
2	TNX (P Nation)	180 Seconds (180초)	Lyrics: Penomeco, Damian; Composition: Yoo Gun-hyung, Penomeco; Arrangement: Yoo Gun-hyung; Choreography: B.B Trippin', Kim Yoon (P Nation), Just Jerk, Choi Tae-hun	Cheon Jun-hyeok
2	TNX (P Nation)	180 Seconds (180초)	Lyrics: Penomeco, Damian; Composition: Yoo Gun-hyung, Penomeco; Arrangement: Yoo Gun-hyung; Choreography: B.B Trippin', Kim Yoon (P Nation), Just Jerk, Choi Tae-hun	Eun Hwi
2	TNX (P Nation)	180 Seconds (180초)	Lyrics: Penomeco, Damian; Composition: Yoo Gun-hyung, Penomeco; Arrangement: Yoo Gun-hyung; Choreography: B.B Trippin', Kim Yoon (P Nation), Just Jerk, Choi Tae-hun	Oh Sung-jun

Special Collaboration
Order	Song	Original Artist	Production Credit	Group Name	Group	Members
1	Mic Drop	BTS	Lyrics: RM, Supreme Boi, Flowsik, "Hitman" Bang, J-Hope; Composition: Pdogg; Arrangement: Tasco, 1MAD; Choreography: Team The Bips	Woo-Kei-Cheon-Gye	JYP	Keiju Okamoto
1	Mic Drop	BTS	Lyrics: RM, Supreme Boi, Flowsik, "Hitman" Bang, J-Hope; Composition: Pdogg; Arrangement: Tasco, 1MAD; Choreography: Team The Bips	Woo-Kei-Cheon-Gye	JYP	Lee Gye-hun
1	Mic Drop	BTS	Lyrics: RM, Supreme Boi, Flowsik, "Hitman" Bang, J-Hope; Composition: Pdogg; Arrangement: Tasco, 1MAD; Choreography: Team The Bips	Woo-Kei-Cheon-Gye	P Nation	Woo Kyung-jun
1	Mic Drop	BTS	Lyrics: RM, Supreme Boi, Flowsik, "Hitman" Bang, J-Hope; Composition: Pdogg; Arrangement: Tasco, 1MAD; Choreography: Team The Bips	Woo-Kei-Cheon-Gye	P Nation	Cheon Jun-hyeok
2	Walk Your Walk	Original Production	Lyrics: J.Y. Park & Psy; Composition: J.Y. Park & Psy; Arrangement: J.Y. Park, Lee Hae-sol; Choreography: Team The Bips	JYP X P Nation	TBA (JYP)	Yoon Min
2	Walk Your Walk	Original Production	Lyrics: J.Y. Park & Psy; Composition: J.Y. Park & Psy; Arrangement: J.Y. Park, Lee Hae-sol; Choreography: Team The Bips	JYP X P Nation	TBA (JYP)	Lee Gye-hun
2	Walk Your Walk	Original Production	Lyrics: J.Y. Park & Psy; Composition: J.Y. Park & Psy; Arrangement: J.Y. Park, Lee Hae-sol; Choreography: Team The Bips	JYP X P Nation	TBA (JYP)	Amaru Mitsuyuki
2	Walk Your Walk	Original Production	Lyrics: J.Y. Park & Psy; Composition: J.Y. Park & Psy; Arrangement: J.Y. Park, Lee Hae-sol; Choreography: Team The Bips	JYP X P Nation	TBA (JYP)	Keiju Okamoto
2	Walk Your Walk	Original Production	Lyrics: J.Y. Park & Psy; Composition: J.Y. Park & Psy; Arrangement: J.Y. Park, Lee Hae-sol; Choreography: Team The Bips	JYP X P Nation	TBA (JYP)	Lee Dong-hyeon
2	Walk Your Walk	Original Production	Lyrics: J.Y. Park & Psy; Composition: J.Y. Park & Psy; Arrangement: J.Y. Park, Lee Hae-sol; Choreography: Team The Bips	JYP X P Nation	TNX (P Nation)	Woo Kyung-jun
2	Walk Your Walk	Original Production	Lyrics: J.Y. Park & Psy; Composition: J.Y. Park & Psy; Arrangement: J.Y. Park, Lee Hae-sol; Choreography: Team The Bips	JYP X P Nation	TNX (P Nation)	Choi Tae-hun
2	Walk Your Walk	Original Production	Lyrics: J.Y. Park & Psy; Composition: J.Y. Park & Psy; Arrangement: J.Y. Park, Lee Hae-sol; Choreography: Team The Bips	JYP X P Nation	TNX (P Nation)	Jang Hyun-soo
2	Walk Your Walk	Original Production	Lyrics: J.Y. Park & Psy; Composition: J.Y. Park & Psy; Arrangement: J.Y. Park, Lee Hae-sol; Choreography: Team The Bips	JYP X P Nation	TNX (P Nation)	Cheon Jun-hyeok
2	Walk Your Walk	Original Production	Lyrics: J.Y. Park & Psy; Composition: J.Y. Park & Psy; Arrangement: J.Y. Park, Lee Hae-sol; Choreography: Team The Bips	JYP X P Nation	TNX (P Nation)	Eun Hwi
2	Walk Your Walk	Original Production	Lyrics: J.Y. Park & Psy; Composition: J.Y. Park & Psy; Arrangement: J.Y. Park, Lee Hae-sol; Choreography: Team The Bips	JYP X P Nation	TNX (P Nation)	Oh Sung-jun

==== Final results ====
Color key

MVP

Rank	Agency	Contestant	Debuting Group
1	JYP	Lee Gye-hun	KickFlip
2	P Nation	Cheon Jun-hyeok	TNX
3	JYP	Keiju Okamoto	KickFlip
4	P Nation	Koki Tanaka	—N/a
5	P Nation	Eun Hwi	TNX
6	P Nation	Woo Kyung-jun	TNX
7	JYP	Amaru Mitsuyuki	KickFlip
8	JYP	Lee Dong-hyeon	KickFlip
9	JYP	Yoon Min	—N/a
10	P Nation	Choi Tae-hun	TNX
11	P Nation	Jang Hyun-soo	TNX
12	P Nation	Oh Sung-jun	TNX
