= Pow (band) =

South Korean boy band

- Origin: Seoul, South Korea
- Genre: K-pop
- Years active: 2023–present
- Label: Grid Entertainment
- Members: Yorch; Hyunbin; Jungbin; Dongyeon; Hong

Pow (Korean: 파우; stylized in all caps) is a South Korean boy band formed by Grid Entertainment in 2023. The group consists of five members: Yorch, Hyunbin, Jungbin, Dongyeon, and Hong. The group made their official debut on October 11, 2023.

== History ==
=== Pre-debut ===
On July 10, 2023, Grid Entertainment announced that Thai actor Yorch had signed an exclusive contract with them. They also revealed their plan to launch a new boy group including Yorch in the second half of 2023. On August 1, Grid opened the group's official social media accounts revealing all the five members of the group as well as the group's name as Pow. On the same day, it was confirmed that the band will make its official debut in September 2023.

Prior to joining the group, Yorch was an active actor in Thailand who appeared on multiple television series. He was also a part of what was widely rumored to be Big Hit Music's upcoming boy group with the tentative name Trainee A. However, the debut project was later cancelled. Dongyeon participated in SBS's reality competition show Loud in 2021. He was eliminated in round 7, finishing in 15th place.

=== 2023–present: Debut with Favorite ===
On September 13, 2023, Pow released their pre-release single "Favorite" before releasing their debut EP on October 11, 2023. On October 4, the music video of the EP, "Amazing" was released. On October 11, they officially debuted with the release of their EP and music video for "Dazzling". The group made their official broadcast debut on music program M Countdown on September 14.

On January 9, 2024, the group announced their upcoming release scheduled for January 15. On January 25, Pow released a music video digital single titled "Valentine". On September 11, Pow announced that they would be unveiling a pre-release single on September 23 before making their comeback with their second EP in October. The next day, the EP was revealed to be released on October 21. In addition, they would be releasing a pre-release single "Sunset" on September 23. On October 10, Grid announced that Pow's second EP title would be Boyfriend and the lead track of the same name, which is a remake of Avril Lavigne's "Girlfriend".

== Members ==
- Yorch (요치)
- Hyunbin (현빈)
- Jungbin (정빈)
- Dongyeon (동연)
- Hong (홍)

== Discography ==
=== Extended plays ===
List of extended plays, showing selected details, selected chart positions, and sales figures
Title	Details	Peak chart positions	Sales
Title	Details	KOR	Sales
Favorite	Released: October 11, 2023; Label: Grid Entertainment; Formats: CD, digital download, streaming; Track listing: 1. "Favorite"; 2. "Dazzling"; 3. "Slow Dancing"; 4. "Amazing"	24	KOR: 24,445
Boyfriend	Released: October 21, 2024; Label: Grid Entertainment; Formats: CD, digital download, streaming; Track listing: 1. "Boyfriend"; 2. "I"; 3. "Bae"; 4. "Sunset"	25	KOR: 18,064
Being Tender	Released: June 27, 2025; Label: Grid Entertainment; Formats: CD, digital download, streaming; Track listing: 1. "Being Tender"; 2. "Reason"; 3. "Celebrate"; 4. "Fingerprint"	7	KOR: 38,286

=== Single albums ===
List of single albums, showing selected details, selected chart positions, and sales figures
Title	Details	Peak chart positions	Sales
Title	Details	KOR	Sales
Always There (Original Soundtrack)	Released: April 25, 2025; Label: Grid Entertainment; Formats: CD, digital download, streaming	18	KOR: 9,953
Come True	Released: January 28, 2026; Label: Grid Entertainment; Formats: CD, digital download, streaming	7	KOR: 23,431
Flavor	Released: July 28, 2026; Label: Grid Entertainment; Formats: CD, digital download, streaming	9	KOR: 14,367

=== Singles ===
List of singles, with selected peak chart positions
Title	Year	Peak chart position	Album
Title	Year	KOR Down.	Album
"Favorite"	2023	178	Favorite
"Dazzling"	2023	—	Favorite
"Valentine"	2024	137	Non-album single
"Sunset"	2024	66	Boyfriend
"Boyfriend"	2024	64	Boyfriend
"Gimme Love"	2025	32	Non-album singles
"Always There"	2025	—	Non-album singles
"Being Tender"	2025	39	Being Tender
"Wall Flowers"	2025	166	Non-album single
"Come True" (feat. 신온유 of 신인류)	2026	11	Come True
"Flavor"	2026	—	Flavor
"—" denotes releases that did not chart or were not released in that territory.

== Videography ==
=== Music videos ===
Title	Year	Director(s)	Length	Ref.
"Favorite"	2023	Kim Minjae (sigakryu)	3:40	
"Amazing"	2023	Nalim Cho (Ambience)	3:30	
"Dazzling"	2023	Kim Minjae (sigakryu)	3:14	
"Valentine"	2024	Han Daehee (Handaehee Studio)	2:45	
"Boyfriend"	2024	Han Daehee (Handaehee Studio)	3:14	

== Awards and nominations ==
Name of the award ceremony, year presented, award category, nominee(s) of the award, and the result of the nomination
Award ceremony	Year	Category	Nominee(s)/work(s)	Result	Ref.
Seoul Music Awards	2024	Rookie of the Year	Pow	Nominated	
