= Way Up =

- Digital cover

EP by TNX
- Released: May 17, 2022
- Length: 17:00
- Language: Korean
- Label: P Nation

TNX chronology
Way Up (2022)	Love Never Dies (2023)

Singles from Way Up
- 1. "Move" Released: May 17, 2022

Way Up is the debut extended play by South Korean boy group TNX. It was released by P Nation on May 17, 2022, and contains five tracks, including the lead single "Move".

== Background and release ==
On March 29, 2022, it was announced the group would be officially called TNX (The New Six), and they made their official debut on May 17. On April 25, it was announced that the group would debut with the release of their debut EP Way Up.

== Track listing ==
Way Up track listing
No.	Title	Lyrics	Music	Arrangement	Length
1.	"We On"	Eun Hwi; Woo Kyungjun; Cheon Junhyeok	Eun Hwi	Eun Hwi	3:21
2.	"180sec" (180초)	Penomeco; Damian	Yoo Kung-hyung; Penomeco	Yoo Kung-hyung	2:59
3.	"Move" (비켜)	Penomeco; Damian	Yoo Kung-hyung; Penomeco	Yoo Kung-hyung	3:32
4.	"Burst Up" (벌써)	Penomeco; Damian	Penomeco; APRO	APRO	3:17
5.	"Your Favorite Melody" (작은 노래)	Eun Hwi	Eun Hwi	Eun Hwi	3:51
Total length:					17:00

== Charts ==
Chart performance for Way Up
Chart (2022)	Peak position
Japanese Hot Albums (Billboard Japan)	82
South Korean Albums (Gaon)	9
