= Xodiac (band) =

South Korean boy band

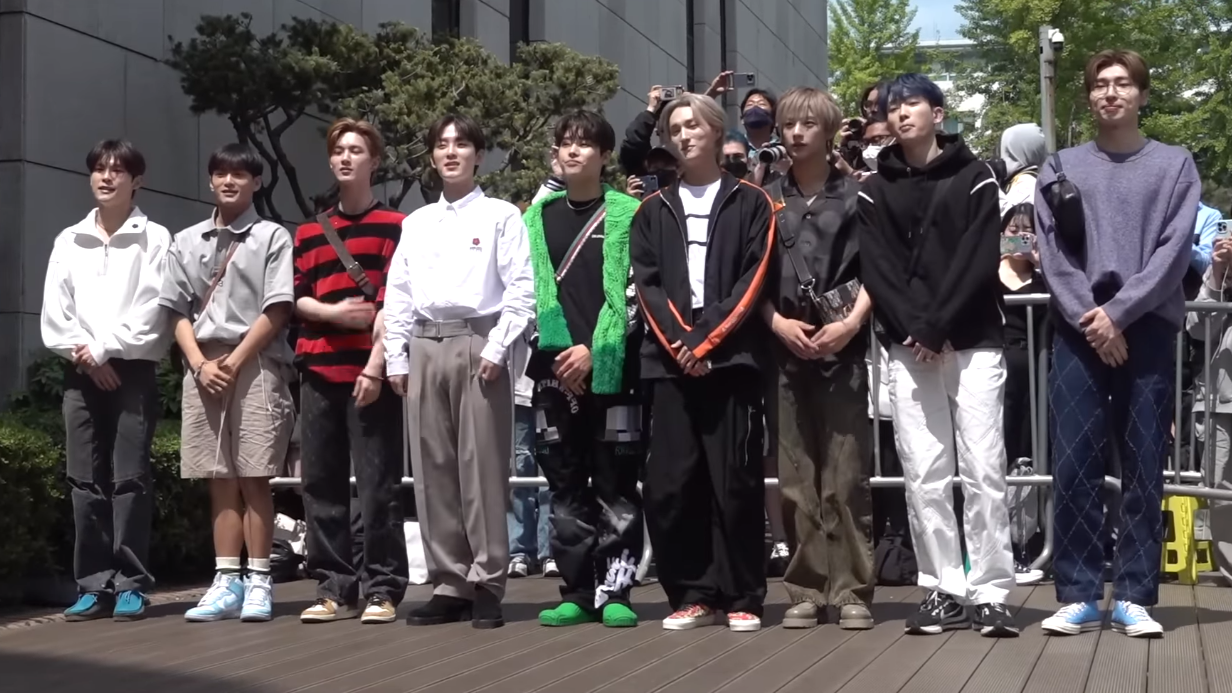
- Xodiac in April 2023

Background information
- Origin: Seoul, South Korea
- Genres: K-pop; hip hop
- Years active: 2023–present
- Label: One Cool Jacso
- Spinoffs: X-UNIT
- Members: Hyunsik; Zayyan; Lex; Beomsoo; Gyumin; Wain; Sing; Davin; Leo

Xodiac (Korean: 소디엑; stylized in all caps) is a South Korean boy band formed by One Cool Jacso. The group consists of nine members: Hyunsik, Zayyan, Lex, Beomsoo, Gyumin, Wain, Sing, Davin, and Leo. The group made their official debut on April 25, 2023, with the release of the digital single "Throw a Dice".

== Career ==
=== Pre-debut ===
Prior to the group's debut, several members had participated in reality competition shows. Zayyan participated in the shows Rising Star Indonesia in 2018 and Indonesian Idol in 2019. In 2019, Hyunsik competed in Mnet's survival reality show, Produce X 101. However, he did not make it into the final lineup of the boy group, X1. In 2021, Lex competed in the show Loud under his birth name Zo Doo-hyun. He was eliminated in the final round of the show.

=== 2023–present: Debut with "Throw a Dice" ===
Xodiac made their official debut on April 25, 2023, with the release of their the digital single "Throw a Dice". On June 7, the group released their first extended play Throw a Dice.

== Members ==
- Hyunsik (현식)
- Zayyan (자얀)
- Lex (렉스) – leader
- Beomsoo (범수)
- Gyumin (규민)
- Wain (웨인)
- Sing (씽)
- Davin (다빈)
- Leo (레오)

== Discography ==
=== Extended plays ===
Title	Details	Peak chart positions	Sales
Title	Details	KOR	Sales
Throw a Dice	Released: June 7, 2023; Label: One Cool Jacso Entertainment; Formats: CD, digital download, streaming; Track listing: 1. "Throw a Dice"; 2. "Special Love"; 3. "Calling"; 4. "Midnight Sky"; 5. "Always"	37	KOR: 9,506
Some Day	Released: September 25, 2024; Label: One Cool Jacso Entertainment; Formats: CD, digital download, streaming	29	KOR: 7,633
Phantom Fire	Released: June 2, 2026; Label: One Cool Jacso Entertainment; Formats: CD, digital download, streaming	—	KOR: TBA

=== Single albums ===
Title	Details	Peak chart positions	Sales
Title	Details	KOR	Sales
Only Fun	Released: October 30, 2023; Label: One Cool Jacso Entertainment; Formats: CD, digital download, streaming	17	KOR: 25,215
Xoul Day	Released: March 14, 2024; Label: One Cool Jacso Entertainment; Formats: CD, digital download, streaming	14	KOR: 44,989
Glowy Day	Released: February 18, 2025; Label: One Cool Jacso Entertainment; Formats: CD, digital download, streaming	4	KOR: 55,515
Alibi	Released: November 11, 2025; Label: One Cool Jacso Entertainment; Formats: CD, digital download, streaming	11	KOR: 8,000

=== Singles ===
Title	Year	Peak chart positions	Album
Title	Year	KOR Down.	Album
"Throw a Dice"	2023	—	Throw a Dice
"Special Love"	2023	—	Throw a Dice
"Lemonade"	2023	—	Lemonade
"Only Fun"	2023	—	Only Fun
"First Snow"	2023	—	First Snow
"Heyday"	2024	—	Xoul Day
"Our Days"	2024	—	Some Day
"Time 2 Shine"	2025	45	Glowy Day
"Alibi"	2025	34	Alibi
"Phantom Fire"	2026	126	Phantom Fire
X-UNIT (sub-unit)
"Because I'm Stupid"	2025	—	To.U
