= TNX (group) =

South Korean boy group

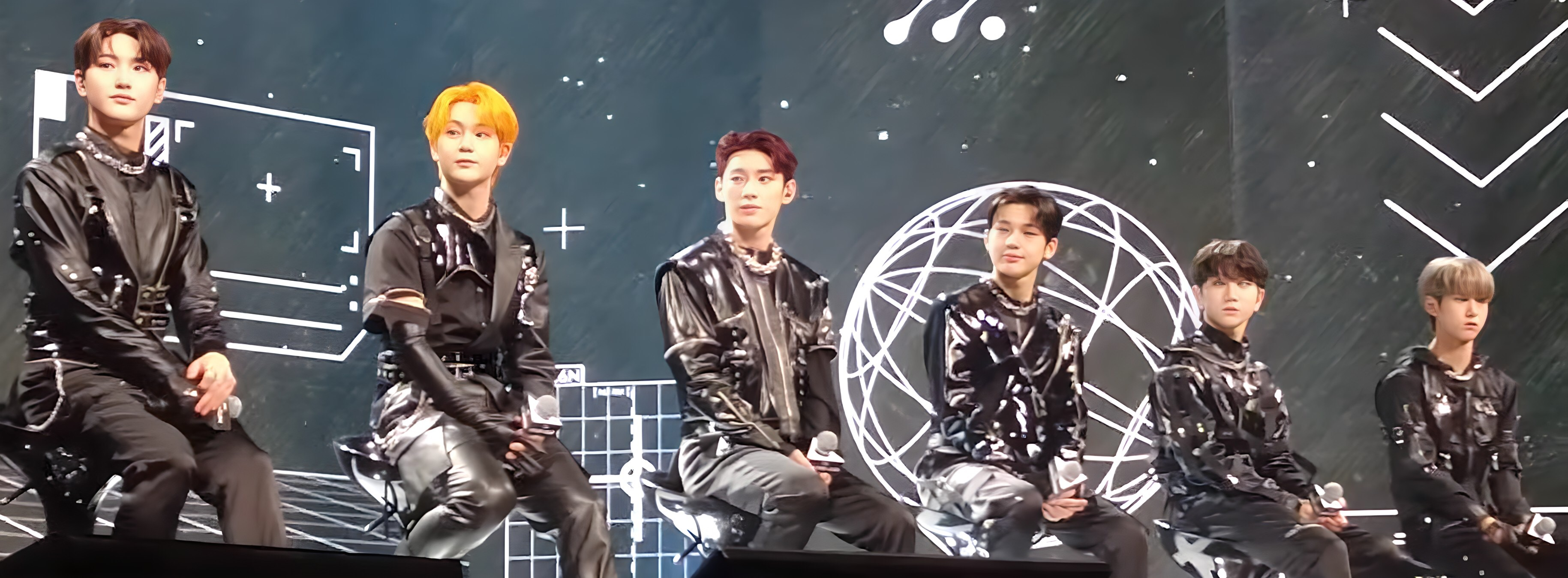
- TNX in May 2022; From left to right: Taehun, Hyunsoo, Kyungjun (former), Junhyeok, Sungjun, and Hwi

Background information
- Also known as: The New Six (2023-2024)
- Origin: Seoul, South Korea
- Genres: K-pop; Hip hop
- Years active: 2022–present
- Label: P Nation
- Members: Taehun; Hyunsoo; Junhyeok; Hwi; Sungjun
- Past members: Kyungjun
- Website: pnation.com/artists/13

TNX (Korean: 티엔엑스; formerly known as The New Six) is a South Korean boy band formed through SBS TV's reality competition program Loud and managed by P Nation. The group consists of five members: Taehun, Hyunsoo, Junhyeok, Hwi, and Sungjun. TNX was originally a six-piece ensemble; former member Kyungjun left the group in October 2024. They debuted on May 17, 2022, with the released of their first extended play (EP) Way Up.

== Name ==
TNX is an acronym for 'The New Six' and refers to the six members in the group's debut lineup.

== History ==
=== Predebut: Formation through Loud, Tanaka Koki's departure ===
TNX was formed through the SBS K-pop reality competition program Loud, which was hosted by two entertainment agencies, JYP Entertainment and P Nation, in South Korea. The show was a collaboration between Psy and Park Jin-young to develop 2 new global boy groups; one under JYP Entertainment and another one under P Nation. The TV program had 75 contestants from various countries who had to prove themselves to be debut-worthy talent. The contestants showed their dancing, composing/arranging, lyric writing, singing, and rapping skills throughout the challenge rounds to the two judges.

Loud premiered on June 5, 2021 and was broadcast every Saturday at 21:00 (KST) on SBS TV. The TV program's finale was on September 11, 2021 with Kyungjun, Taehun, Hyunsoo, Junhyeok, Hwi, Sungjun and Tanaka Koki being selected as the final members of P Nation's new boy group. However, on January 24, 2022, P Nation announced that Koki Tanaka (13 years old at the time) would not debut in the final group in order to pursue further training at P Nation.

=== 2022–2023: Debut with Way Up, Junhyeok's hiatus, Love Never Dies and Boyhood ===
On March 29, 2022, it was announced the group would be officially called TNX, and they would make their official debut on May 17, 2022. On April 25, it was announced that the group would debut their first EP Way Up.

In January 2023, their agency P Nation announced through their official fancafe that member Junhyeok would be temporarily halting activities due to health concerns.

On February 15, 2023, TNX released their second EP Love Never Dies with the lead single "Love or Die". According to P Nation, both "I Need U" and "Love or Die" would serve as the double title tracks for their second EP Love Never Dies.

On May 22, 2023, TNX announced their third EP Boyhood would be released on June 7. On June 7, 2023, TNX released their third EP Boyhood with the lead single "Kick It 4 Now".

On December 28, 2023, TNX "Love or Die" had been selected as No.14 for The 25 Best K-Pop Songs of 2023 by Billboard.

=== 2024-present: Junhyeok's return, Fuego, Road to Kingdom: Ace of Ace and Kyungjun's departure ===
On February 1, 2024, P Nation announced member Junhyeok decided to resume his activities with the group, thereby ending his hiatus of over a year. P Nation also revealed the group's plans for the release of a digital single in late March that year.

On March 20, 2024, TNX released their first digital single "Fuego".

On July 10, 2024, TNX was announced as part of the final line up of Mnet's reality competition show Road to Kingdom: Ace of Ace.

On October 23, 2024, P Nation announced the departure of member Kyungjun, as he would be completing his mandatory military service and did not intend to continue group activities after discharge, thereby terminating his contract with the company.

== Members ==
Current

- Taehun (태훈)
- Hyunsoo (현수)
- Junhyeok (준혁)
- Hwi (휘)
- Sungjun (성준)

Former

- Kyungjun (경준)

== Discography ==
=== Extended plays ===
List of extended plays, showing selected details, selected chart positions, and sales figures
Title	Details	Peak chart positions		Sales
Title	Details	KOR	JPN	Sales
Way Up	Released: May 17, 2022; Label: P Nation; Formats: CD, digital download, streaming	9	—	KOR: 73,634
Love Never Dies	Released: February 15, 2023; Label: P Nation; Formats: CD, digital download, streaming	5	42	KOR: 89,343; JPN: 1,449 (Phy.)
Boyhood	Released: June 7, 2023; Label: P Nation; Formats: CD, digital download, streaming	6	50	KOR: 55,119; JPN: 797
For Real?	Released: March 26, 2025; Label: P Nation; Formats: CD, digital download, streaming	12	—	KOR: 33,044
"—" denotes a recording that did not chart or was not released in that territory

=== Singles ===
List of singles, showing year released, selected chart positions, and name of the album
Title	Year	Peak chart positions	Album
Title	Year	KOR Down.	Album
"Move" (비켜)	2022	110	Way Up
"I Need U"	2023	122	Love Never Dies
"Love or Die"	2023	92	Love Never Dies
'Kick It 4 Now"	2023	150	Boyhood
"Fuego"	2024	97	Non-album single
"For Real?"	2025	152	For Real?
"Call Me Back"	2026	118	Non-album singles
"Die Another Day"	2026	155	Non-album singles

=== Other charted songs ===
List of other charted songs, showing year released, selected chart positions, and name of the album
Title	Year	Peak chart positions	Album
Title	Year	KOR Down.	Album
"We On"	2022	186	Way Up
"180sec" (180초)	2022	180	Way Up
"Burst Up" (벌써)	2022	189	Way Up
"Your Favorite Melody" (작은 노래)	2022	179	Way Up
"Love Never Dies"	2023	157	Love Never Dies
"Wasn't Ready"	2023	152	Love Never Dies
"Slingshot"	2023	151	Love Never Dies
"Dda Dda Dda" (short version) (따따따 (Short ver.))	2023	153	Love Never Dies

== Videography ==
=== Music videos ===
Title	Year	Director(s)	Note	Ref.
"Move"	2022	725 (SL8)	Debut music video	
"I Need U"	2023	HOBIN (a HOBIN film)	Comeback music videos	
"Love or Die"	2023	HOBIN (a HOBIN film)	Comeback music videos	
"Kick It 4 Now"	2023	Bang Jae-yeob (BANGJAEYEOB FILM)	Comeback music videos	
"Fuego"	2024	Paranoid Paradigm (VM Project Architecture)	Comeback music videos	
"For Real?"	2025	Bang Jae-yeob (BANGJAEYEOB FILM)	Comeback music videos	
"Call Me Back"	2026		Comeback music videos	

== Awards and nominations ==
Name of the award ceremony, year presented, award category, nominee(s) of the award, and the result of the nomination
Award ceremony	Year	Category	Nominee(s)/work(s)	Result	Ref.
Genie Music Awards	2022	New Wave Icons	TNX	Won	
Genie Music Awards	2022	Best Male Rookie Award	TNX	Nominated	
Hanteo Music Awards	2023	Rookie of the Year - Male	TNX	Won	
Hanteo Music Awards	2023	Artist of the Year Main Prize	TNX	Nominated	
Hanteo Music Awards	2023	WhosFandom Award	TNX	Nominated	
K Global Heart Dream Awards (Note: Hosted by the Awards Organizing Committee, Celeb Media, and YJ Partners and sponsored by Sports Today, the K Global Heart Dream Awards honors K-pop artists at the center of world culture as part of the Hallyu Wave.)	2022	K-Global Rising Star Award	TNX	Won	
MAMA Awards	2022	Best New Male Artist	TNX	Nominated	
MAMA Awards	2022	Artist of the Year	TNX	Longlisted	
Seoul Music Awards	2023	Rookie of the Year	TNX	Won	
Seoul Music Awards	2023	Popularity Award	TNX	Nominated	
Seoul Music Awards	2023	Hallyu Special Award	TNX	Nominated	
The Fact Music Awards	2022	Global Hottest Award	TNX	Won	
