= Loud (TV program) =

2021 South Korean television series

- Promotional poster
- Hangul: 라우드
- RR: Raudeu
- MR: Raudŭ
- Genre: Survival show
- Created by: JYP Entertainment; P Nation
- Presented by: Park Jin-young; Psy; Lee Seung-gi
- Country of origin: South Korea
- Original language: Korean
- No. of episodes: 15

Production
- Running time: 70–125 minutes
- Production company: Dragon Sky

Original release
- Network: SBS TV
- Release: June 5 – September 11, 2021

Loud (Korean: 라우드; stylized in all caps) is a 2021 South Korean boy group survival reality show organized by JYP Entertainment and P Nation. It was a collaboration between Psy and J.Y. Park to form 2 boy groups: one under JYP Entertainment and another one under P Nation. The program involved 75 contestants from different countries with artistic talents competing for a spot in one of the 2 groups. The program premiered on June 5, 2021, and was broadcast every Saturday at 9 PM KST on SBS. During the finale on September 11, two groups were formed, with P Nation's group, TNX, later debuting in 2022, and JYP's group, KickFlip, debuting in January 2025.

== Promotion and broadcast ==
Auditions for the program opened on November 2, 2020, and closed on January 31, 2021, aiming at boys born after 2000 regardless of nationality.

On April 26, 2021, the program was reported to premiere on June 5, 2021, on SBS.

On May 6, the profile photos for J.Y. Park and Psy were revealed along with the premiere time, which would be on June 5 at 9 PM KST. On the same day, the first contestant, Daniel Jikal, was revealed through a teaser clip.

On May 20, the other 74 contestants were revealed through teaser clips, including former 1the9 member, Lee Seung-hwan, and Mason Moon's brother, Maden Moon.

On May 27, 2 contestants, Ham Mo-hyeob and Riku, left the program early due to their decision to withdraw from the program. As a result, the program would start with 73 contestants instead of the original 75.

On July 24, Lee Seung-gi joined the program as Special Agent, a unique position whose task is to provide the remaining contestants with warmth, guidance, and support as they prepare for the finale.

== Concept ==
Unlike other Korean survival shows, this program aims at boys who are not trainees under an agency, though there are still some boys who are trainees under JYP Entertainment, P Nation, and other entertainment agencies. The program also seeks contestants with artistic talents in various fields, including art creativity, singing, dancing, rapping, songwriting, arranging music, and playing musical instruments.

== Episodes ==
=== Episode 1 (June 5, 2021) ===
The program started with an interview in 2020 involving producers J.Y. Park and Psy explaining the concept of the program. On April 8, 2021, they entered Loud Center at Cosmo 40 in Incheon for a tour. In Loud Center, contestants perform for their entry in front of the two producers. The next day, the first contestants enter Loud Center and meet J.Y. Park and Psy for the first time. They learn about the rules and procedures of the program. In the first round, each contestant must show two performances, a charm performance and a skill performance, to appeal to the producers. Each producer has three buttons on his chair, each making the chair move up one step. Once their chair reaches Level 3, they can press the Pass button. The first producer to press this button gets priority in scouting the contestant for their agency. If both producers press their Pass buttons, the contestant passes to the next round. Six contestants (Lee Dong-hyeon, Eun Hwi, Zo Doo-hyun, Keiju, Koki, Daniel Jikal) performed in this episode.

=== Episode 2 (June 12, 2021) ===
The first round continues with performances by more contestants. Three contestants (Hong Yeon-sung, Song Si-hyun, Haruto) perform. Five trainees under P Nation and three under JYP Entertainment are introduced, displaying two group performances - one for each agency. All trainees in Loud Center become contestants and can only continue as trainees under the agencies if they pass the first round. The episode shows the performances of three trainees (Cheon Jun-hyeok, Woo Kyung-jun, Lee Gye-hun).

=== Episode 3 (June 19, 2021) ===
The first round continues with performances by five other contestants. After the 5th and 17th overall contestant performed, unaired performances by 18 contestants were shown with agency shown on each of them. The first round ends with Zo Doo-hyun and Nam Yun-seung being cast to JYP Entertainment after getting their second chance. Of all 73 contestants, 35 moved on to the second round while the other 38 failed the first round, resulting in them being eliminated. After the first round, Loud Center was moved into Alpensia Resort in Pyeongchang, Gangwon for the second round. In the second round, remaining contestants are split into 16 teams of 2 or 3 according to their new agency and perform a cover song. The team with the highest score wins and the member of the losing team with the lowest individual score will be nominated for elimination. Among the eight nominees, the five nominees with the lowest total score will be eliminated. Two teams performed first in this episode.

=== Episode 4 (June 26, 2021) ===
The second round continues with performances by eight other teams. At the end of the fifth battle, both performing teams were tied with a score of 191, so a new rule was added. If both teams of a battle are tied, all individual scores will be added up and the team with the highest total individual score wins and moves on to the third round. The episode ends with the results of the global fan poll from the previous week, with Lee Gye-hun taking first place.

=== Episode 5 (July 3, 2021) ===
The second round continues with performances by 4 other teams. After the last battle, 3 out of 8 nominees were safe, which were Na Yun-seo, Lim Kyoung-mun, and Keiju Okamoto respectively. After the second round, all remaining contestants moved to JYP Entertainment, where they will be trained for the third round. Before the remaining contestants moved to JYP Entertainment, Loud Center was moved into Namdong Gymnasium back in Incheon for the rest of the program before the live rounds. In the third round, Park Jin-young will divide the contestants into teams and assign them into one of these three categories: Creative Music, Creative Dance, and Idol Group. At the end of each performance, Psy will score them out of 100 and each will be ranked individually by Park Jin-young. The team with the highest score on each category will be exempted from elimination and the contestant with the lowest ranks of their category will be nominated for elimination. The episode ends with the results of the global fan poll from the previous week, with Lee Gye-hun staying in first place.

=== Episode 6 (July 10, 2021) ===
The third round continues with the result of the final team from the last episode. After the result of the final team, teams from the second and third categories perform. After the last performance, Psy will randomly choose 2 out of 6 nominees to be safe and move on to the next round, which were Zo Doo-hyun and Kim Jeong-min respectively. The episode ends with the results of the global fan poll from the previous week, with Lee Gye-hun staying in first place.

=== Episode 7 (July 17, 2021) ===
After the third round, all remaining contestants moved to P Nation, where they will be trained for the fourth round. Before the fourth round, all remaining contestants will do a mini-mission, where they will showcase their hip-hop skills, whether it is rap, dance, or sing. In the fourth round, Psy will divide the contestants into teams and assign them into one of these two categories: Creative Music and K-Pop Group. At the end of each performance, Park Jin-young will score them out of 100 and each will be ranked individually by Psy. The team with the highest score on each category will be exempted from elimination. Three contestants from the second-place team (one contestant) and the third-place team (two contestants) with the lowest ranks from each team of their categories will be nominated for elimination. The episode ends with the results of the global fan poll from the previous week, with Lee Gye-hun staying in first place.

=== Episode 8 (July 24, 2021) ===
Due to the 2020 Summer Olympics, this episode was delayed to 10:20 PM KST to avoid scheduling conflicts. The fourth round continues with performances by the remaining teams. The 3 nominees who will move on to the fifth round are Kim Min-seoung, Jang Hyun-soo, and Kim Dong-hyun. After the fourth round, it featured an appearance by Lee Seung-gi who will not only be the host of the finale but also the "Super Agent". The episode ends with the results of the global fan poll from the previous week, with Lee Gye-hun staying in first place.

=== Episode 9 (July 31, 2021) ===
Due to the 2020 Summer Olympics, this episode was delayed to 10:45 PM KST to avoid scheduling conflicts. The episode starts with a flashback from the premiere episode. Later, the contestants meet Lee Seung-gi, the Super Agent. Three days later, the fifth round begins. In the fifth round, 22 contestants are split into 3 groups and perform individually according to their voting rank. There will be a maximum of ten finalists for each company. If each company has fewer than ten finalists, those who do not have a casting card will be given a chance to do so. When the number of finalists for each company exceeds ten, those who do not have a casting card are eliminated. Five contestants from Group 1 performed first. The episode ends with the results of the global fan poll from the previous week, with Lee Gye-hun staying in first place.

=== Episode 10 (August 7, 2021) ===
Due to the 2020 Summer Olympics ending the day after, the rest of this program has returned to its normal schedule. The fifth round continues with individual performances by the remaining Group 1 members and Group 2. By the end of this episode, there are four finalists under JYP Entertainment while P Nation has six. The episode ends with the results of the global fan poll from the previous week, with Keiju Okamoto replacing Lee Gye-hun in first place.

=== Episode 11 (August 14, 2021) ===
The fifth round continues with individual performances by Woo Kyung-jun of Group 2 and all Group 3 members. After the final performance, Psy and Park Jin-young will deliberate and pick one or two nominees or neither to join the casting teams. Psy chooses Jang Hyun-soo and Koki Tanaka into his team while Park Jin-young only chooses Kang Hyun-woo leaving Lim Kyoung-mun, Kim Min-seoung, and Lee Su-jae to be eliminated. By the end of this episode, there are nine finalists under JYP Entertainment while P Nation has ten. The episode ends with the results of the global fan poll from the previous week, with Lee Gye-hun replacing Keiju Okamoto in first place.

=== Episode 12 (August 21, 2021) ===
This episode has been broadcast live as the live rounds begin in this episode. Before the live rounds, Loud Center was moved into Songdo Convensia in Incheon to broadcast the live rounds with live audience. In the live rounds, the two teams must compete against each other for a chance to win and debut. The winner of each live round will be decided by live votes from the program's website, the SBS app, text messages, and SuperStar (The SuperStar, P NATION, JYPNATION). After the winning team is announced, the eliminated members are decided by the agency and fan evaluations. For the agency evaluation, each producer decides if he will eliminate a member based on his feedback. For the fan evaluation, the members of both teams with the fewest votes are automatically nominated for elimination and the member of the losing team with the fewest votes will be eliminated. If there are no eliminated members according to the agency evaluation or a member that they need is eliminated, Psy and Park Jin-young can use a wildcard to exempt from elimination. The number of debuting members for each team will be decided based on the elimination results and those who survive until the last round on September 4 will debut under their agencies. A special gift will be given to the confirmed debuting members and their fans during the live finale on September 11.

The first live round has three evaluations: Identity, Same Song, and Crossover. In Identity, the members perform together as a full team while making a remake or cover of a song by their labelmates. In the next two evaluations, the members perform in separate units assigned by both labels. In Same Song, the units perform the same song chosen by JYP and P Nation with a different concept. In Crossover, the units perform a mashup of two different songs with different concepts. P Nation wins the round with a total of 130,626 votes while JYP loses the round with a total of 85,245 votes, resulting in Kang Hyun-woo, Park Yong-geon, and Kim Dong-hyun being eliminated. The global fan poll was replaced with the individual voting results at the end of each live round, with Lee Gye-hun taking the spot for the most votes overall with 194,914 votes.

=== Episode 13 (August 28, 2021) ===
This episode has been broadcast live as the live rounds continue in this episode. After the sixth round, the seventh round is introduced as the second live round. The second live round has three evaluations: Billboard, Girl Group, and School Concept. In Billboard, the members perform a cover of a successful song on Billboard Hot 100 using their English knowledge. As most members are learning English at the time they joined the program, they need to practice their English for their songs in order to impress Psy and Park Jin-young. In the next two evaluations, the members perform in separate units assigned by both labels. In Girl Group, the units perform a cover of a successful song by a K-pop girl group. In School Concept, the units perform a cover of a school-themed song while wearing student uniforms. P Nation wins the round with a total of 134,760 votes while JYP loses the round with a total of 104,195 votes, resulting in Lee Ye-dam, Yoon Dong-yeon, and Lee Dong-hyeon being eliminated. Park Jin-young used a wildcard to save Lee Dong-hyeon from elimination. The episode ends with the individual voting results for this round, with Keiju Okamoto replacing Lee Gye-hun in first place with 44,684 votes.

=== Episode 14 (September 4, 2021) ===
This episode has been broadcast live as the live rounds end in this episode. After the seventh round, the eighth round is introduced as the third live round and the last round of the program. The last round has two evaluations: Fan's Choice and Retro K-pop. In Fan's Choice, the members perform a song chosen by the majority of fans and viewers using a concept that best fits the song. In Retro K-pop, the members perform a cover of a K-pop song that was released between the 1980s and 1990s. A special collaboration will be included and will not count as part of the evaluations, with Hyuna collaborating with P Nation and Stray Kids' Bang Chan, Changbin, and Han collaborating with JYP. JYP wins the round with a total of 75,464 votes while P Nation loses the round with a total of 63,407 votes, resulting in Zo Doo-hyun, Daniel Jikal, and Jang Hyun-soo being eliminated. Psy used a wildcard to save Jang Hyun-soo from elimination. The episode ends with the individual voting results for this round, with Koki Tanaka replacing Keiju Okamoto in first place with 48,387 votes.

=== Episode 15 (September 11, 2021) ===
This episode has been broadcast live as the program ends with a special stage. The episode starts with an interview about the final members' journey after the program started. After five months and two days of intense competition, the program came to an end. The final members of the two groups are debuting together under their companies as they successfully survived until September 4. The group names will be announced and the two groups perform a song produced by each other's producer. The names of the two debut singles will be revealed and performed for the first time and are expected to be released in late-2021. The final ranks of all members will be revealed based on the voting results and the member finishing in first place will be crowned as the "MVP". Both groups perform "Walk Your Walk" before announcing the "MVP" to thank all fans and their staff during the program. Lee Gye-hun was announced as the program's "MVP" since he finished in first place overall. The program ends with the final members bidding a farewell to everyone involved in the program.

== Contestants ==
Color key

Final members of JYP's group KickFlip
Final members of P Nation's group TNX
Eliminated in the final elimination round
Eliminated in the seventh elimination round
Eliminated in the sixth elimination round
Eliminated in the fifth elimination round
Eliminated in the fourth elimination round
Eliminated in the third elimination round
Eliminated in the second elimination round
Eliminated in the first elimination round
Left the program

75 contestants
Lee Gye-hun (이계훈)	Cheon Jun-hyeok (천준혁)	Keiju Okamoto (오카모토 케이주)	Koki Tanaka (다나카 고키)	Eun Hwi (은휘)
Woo Kyung-jun (우경준)	Amaru Mitsuyuki (미츠유키 아마루)	Lee Dong-hyeon (이동현)	Yoon Min (윤민)	Choi Tae-hun (최태훈)
Jang Hyun-soo (장현수)	Oh Sung-jun (오성준)	Daniel Jikal (다니엘 제갈)	Zo Doo-hyun (조두현) (Note: Originally eliminated in the first round, he was saved by JYP Entertainment and moved on to the second round.)	Yoon Dong-yeon (윤동연)
Lee Ye-dam (이예담)	Kim Dong-hyun (김동현)	Kang Hyun-woo (강현우)	Park Yong-geon (박용건)	Kim Min-seoung (김민성)
Lim Kyoung-mun (임경문)	Lee Su-jae (이수재)	Do Min-kyu (도민규)	Haruto Maeda (마에다 하루토)	Kim Jeong-min (김정민)
Nam Yun-seung (남윤승)	Na Yun-seo (나윤서)	Lee Tae-woo (이태우)	Justin Kim (저스틴 김)	Moon Hyeok-jun (문혁준)
Kang Gie-mook (강기묵)	Kim Dae-hee (김대희)	Hong Yeon-sung (홍연성)	Song Si-hyun (송시현)	Ellery Hyun-bae (엘러리 현배)
Jo Min-ki (조민기)	Lee Seung-hwan (이승환)	Tatsunari (타츠나리)	Kim Min-hyuk (김민혁)	Kim Hyun-soo (김현수)
Kim Myung-kyu (김명규)	Choi Soo-woong (최수웅)	Song Joon-hyuk (송준혁)	Shin Hae-in (신해인)	Kim Do-young (김도영)
Kwak Chan (곽찬)	Park Hyeon-min (박현민)	Tsubasa (츠바사)	Kim Min-seo (김민서)	Lee Kang-jun (이강준)
Park Han-bin (박한빈)	Edward Park (에드워드 박)	Kim Tae-sung (김태성)	Jang Hee-won (장희원)	Lee Tae-geon (이태건)
Jeong Tae-jin (정태진)	Ahn Jae-ho (안재호)	Choi Jae-heum (최재흠)	Kang Ha-yoon (강하윤)	Kim Young-seok (김영석)
Lee Sang-woon (이상운)	Kim Joo-seong (김주성)	Yoon Hwan (윤환)	Kim Se-gon (김세곤)	Kwon Yoo-seop (권유섭)
Jeon Gyu-min (전규민)	Jeong Soo-min (정수민)	Lee Min-gyu (이민규)	Kim Seong-min (김성민)	Lin (린)
Kim Hyun-jun (김현준)	Yang Seung-soo (양승수)	Maden Moon (문 메이든)	Ham Mo-hyeob (함모협)	Riku (리쿠)

== Ratings ==
In the ratings below, the highest rating for the program was in red and the lowest rating for the program was in blue. Some of the ratings found have already been rounded off to one decimal place, as they were usually of lower rankings in terms of the day's ratings.

Ep. #	Original Airdate	Nielsen Korea Ratings Nationwide
1	June 5, 2021	9.0%
2	June 12, 2021	7.7%
3	June 19, 2021	6.0%
4	June 26, 2021	5.5%
5	July 3, 2021	4.0%
6	July 10, 2021	3.9%
7	July 17, 2021	3.3%
8	July 24, 2021	3.3%
9	July 31, 2021	4.3%
10	August 7, 2021	2.9%
11	August 14, 2021	4.3%
12	August 21, 2021	3.7%
13	August 28, 2021	3.7%
14	September 4, 2021	3.2%
15	September 11, 2021	2.7%
Average		4.5%

== Awards and nominations ==
Year	Award	Category	Recipient	Result	Ref.
2021	Korea UHD Award	Top Excellence Entertainment Program	Loud	Won	
2021	SBS Entertainment Awards	Excellence Program Award, Show and Sports	Loud	Won	
2021	SBS Entertainment Awards	Entertainer of the Year Award	Lee Seung-gi	Won	
2021	SBS Entertainment Awards	Producer's Award	Lee Seung-gi	Won	

== Aftermath ==
- JYP Entertainment's group was expected to debut in the first half of 2023. As of November 2024, their debut is unknown.
  - On April 11, 2023, Yoon Min opened up a Personal Instagram account, thus departing from JYP Entertainment and the group JYPE LOUD.
  - Yoon Min participated in Mnet's King of Karaoke: VS, and Mnet's Boys II Planet. He was eliminated in the eighth episode of Boys II Planet after ranking 30th.
  - On January 6, 2022, it was revealed that the JYP group will be debuted under the name "KickFlip" with the debut date announced on January 20, 2025.
- P Nation's group debuted in 2022.
  - The group originally consisted of seven members at the time of the finale; however, on January 24, 2022, Koki Tanaka left the group due to concerns over his age, resulting in a six-member group. Despite his departure from the group, he remained as a trainee under P Nation.
  - On March 29, 2022, it was revealed that the P Nation group will be debuted under the name "TNX" (Stands for "The New siX") with the debut date announced on May 17, 2022.
  - On October 23, 2024, P Nation announced Kyungjun's enlistment in the military and departure from P Nation and TNX.
Other contestants
- Some contestants debuted with groups:
  - Lim Kyoung-mun debuted in Brand New Music's boy group, Younite on April 20, 2022.
  - Ahn Jae-ho will debut in KD Entertainment's boy group, Black A.
  - Zo Doo-hyun debuted in One Cool Jasco's boy group, Xodiac on April 25, 2023, under the name Lex.
  - Jang Hee-won debuted in n.CH's boy group n.Ssign on August 9, 2023.
  - Kim Min-seoung officially debuted in Redstart ENM's boy group Tiot on April 22, 2024.
  - Park Han-bin debuted in Jellyfish's boy group Evnne on September 19, 2023.
  - Maeda Haruto debuted in YY's boy group TOZ on September 27, 2023.
  - Youn Dong-yeon will debut in GRID's boy group Pow on October 11, 2023.
  - Lee Ye-dam debuted in Armada's boy group One Pact on November 30, 2023.
- Some contestants joined new companies:
  - Lim Kyoung-mun joined Brand New Music.
  - Kim Dong-hyun joined P Nation as a trainee.
  - Zo Doo-hyun joined One Cool Jacso Entertainment as a trainee.
  - Maden Moon joined Big Hit Music as a trainee.
  - Yoon Dong-yeon and Park Yong-geon joined Fantagio as trainees.
  - Lee Seung-hwan joined RBW as a trainee.
  - Ahn Jae-ho joined KD Entertainment.
  - Lee Ye-dam joined LM Entertainment as a trainee.
  - Maeda Haruto and Park Han-bin joined Wake One Entertainment as trainees.
  - Kim Min-seoung joined Redstart ENM as a trainee.
  - Jung Soo-min joined Neuron Music.
- Some contestants are going to participate in other survival shows:
  - Kang Ha-yoon participated in TV Chosun's Korea's Next K-pop Star.
  - Jang Hee-won and Jeong Soo-min participated in Channel A's Stars Awakening.
  - Kim Min-seoung, Lee Seung-hwan, Lee Ye-dam, Maeda Haruto and Park Han-bin participated in Mnet's Boys Planet.
  - Kang Hyun-woo, Kim Dae-hee and Moon Hyeok-jun participated in MBC's Fantasy Boys.
  - Kim Min-seo and Lee Tae-woo participated in BS Yoshimoto's Boku Debut.
  - Kim Young-seok participated in Mnet's King of Karaoke: VS.
  - Do Min-kyu, Kang Hyun-woo, Kim Jeong-min, Kim Se-gon, Kim Sung-min, Kim Tae-sung and Lee Tae-woo participated in JTBC's Project 7.
  - Kim Dong-hyun, and Na Yun-seo participated in Mnet's Boys II Planet. Kim Dong-hyun was eliminated in the fifth episode after ranking 53rd and Na Yun-seo was eliminated in the tenth episode after ranking 22nd.
