= 2023 in South Korean music =

The following is a list of notable events and releases that have happened in 2023 in music in South Korea.

== Award shows and festivals ==
=== Award ceremonies ===
2023 music award ceremonies in South Korea
Date	Event	Host	Ref.
January 7	37th Golden Disc Awards	Ilgan Sports and JTBC Plus	
January 19	32nd Seoul Music Awards	Sports Seoul	
February 10 and 11	30th Hanteo Music Awards	Hanteo Global	
February 18	12th Circle Chart Music Awards	Korea Music Content Association	
October 10	6th The Fact Music Awards	The Fact and Fan N Star	
November 28 and 29	25th MAMA Awards	CJ ENM	
December 2	15th Melon Music Awards	KakaoBank	
December 14	8th Asia Artist Awards	Star News and Star Continent	

=== Festivals ===
2023 televised music festivals in South Korea
Date	Event	Host	Ref.
December 25	SBS Gayo Daejeon	Seoul Broadcasting System (SBS)	
December 31	MBC Gayo Daejejeon	Munhwa Broadcasting Corporation (MBC)	

== Debuting and disbanding in 2023 ==
=== Debuting groups ===
==== Male groups ====
- 8Turn
- 82Major
- Ampers&One
- BoyNextDoor
- BXB
- Evnne
- Fantasy Boys
- Hori7on
- Lun8
- N.SSign
- One Pact
- Plave
- Pow
- Riize
- The Wind
- Xikers
- Xodiac
- Zerobaseone

===== Sub-units =====
- Shownu X Hyungwon
- NCT DoJaeJung

==== Female groups ====
- BB Girls
- El7z Up
- Kiss of Life
- LimeLight
- Loossemble
- Mave:
- NiziU
- Primrose
- QWER
- TripleS
- Young Posse

=== Solo debuts ===
- Agust D
- Chuu
- Giuk
- Heejin
- Hwang Min-hyun
- Jaechan
- Jang Ye-eun
- Jihyo
- Jimin
- Jini
- Jinyoung
- Jisoo
- Joohoney
- Jungkook
- Lee Mi-joo
- Le'v
- Ren
- Soojin
- Swan
- Taeyong
- V

=== Disbandments ===
- Astro – Jinjin & Rocky
- Astro – Moonbin & Sanha
- BDC (group)
- Blank2y
- Brave Girls (Note: Brave Girls officially disbanded on February 16, 2023, but would reunite 2 months later as BB Girls.)
- D1ce
- GWSN
- Loona
- Momoland
- Snuper
- TO1
- VIXX LR

== Releases in 2023 ==
=== First quarter ===
==== January ====
Date	Album	Artist(s)	Ref.
2	OMG	NewJeans	
4	Incense	Moonbin & Sanha	
5	Rose Blossom	H1-Key	
5	A Dream of ILY:1	ILY:1	
9	Reason	Monsta X	
9	The Piece OF9	SF9	
11	Startrail	Byul	
13	Red Moon	Primrose	
16	Stamp on It	Got the Beat	
16	Love War	Choi Ye-na	
17	My Little Aurora	Cignature	
18	Chapter 0: With	Jinyoung	
24	Monologue	Shin Ye-young	
25	Sensory Flows	Yesung	
25	Pandora's Box	Mave:	
27	The Name Chapter: Temptation	Tomorrow X Together	
28	After the Magic	Parannoul	
28	Gravity	Onewe	
30	Ay-Yo	NCT 127	
30	8Turnrise	8Turn	
30	Intro: Flight and a New Beginning	BXB	
31	Various	Viviz	

==== February ====
Date	Album	Artist(s)	Ref.
1	Strawberry	Epik High	
6	Second Wind	Seventeen BSS	
8	Idiot	Im Chang-jung	
11	I Confess Now	MSG Wannabe M.O.M	
12	Journey	Ahn Ye-eun	
13	Killer	Key	
13	Assemble	TripleS	
14	Seasonal Hiatus	Jay B	
14	Teddy Bear	STAYC	
14	W.A.Y	Tri.be	
15	Love Never Dies	TNX	
15	Cabin Fever	Purple Kiss	
16	Where Does Sasquatch Live? Part 1	Zior Park	
17	Love & Happiness	LimeLight	
20	One	Lee Chan-won	
20	Be Awake	The Boyz	
22	Boxes	Shin Ji-min	
23	How to Sink Slowly	Brokenteeth	
23	How R U	HAWW	
23	Insert Coin	Lucy	
24	The Beginning: Cupid	Fifty Fifty	
27	Truth or Lie	Hwang Min-hyun	
27	My Sun	Kim Hyun-joong	

==== March ====
Date	Album	Artist(s)	Ref.
2	The Flag	Kwon Jin-ah	
2	Seoul Collection	OnlyOneOf	
6	Master: Piece	Cravity	
6	Circle	Onew	
7	O	Yuju	
7	Cherry Dash	Cherry Bullet	
8	The Alchemist	La Poem	
10	Ready to Be	Twice	
10	Essege	TAN	
10	Chosen Karma	Pixy	
12	Asterum	Plave	
13	Rover	Kai	
15	Blue Set Chapter. New Dayz	Trendz	
16	Remember Archive	Code Kunst	
20	Expérgo	Nmixx	
23	History of Kingdom: Part VI. Mujin	Kingdom	
24	Face	Jimin	
28	Sour & Sweet	BamBam	
28	The Billage of Perception: Chapter Three	Billlie	
29	Act 1, Scene 1	Mamamoo+	
29	Delight	CSR	
30	House of Tricky: Doorbell Ringing	Xikers	
31	Me	Jisoo	

=== Second quarter ===
==== April ====
Date	Album	Artist(s)	Ref.
3	Blank Page	Kim Woo-seok	
5	Self	Apink	
10	Lovestruck!	Kep1er	
10	I've Ive	Ive	
10	Without You	Kard	
12	Over the Moon	Chaeyeon	
12	Blank or Black	Park Ji-hoon	
13	The Beginning	Jang Ye-eun	
16	Love.zip	Bolbbalgan4	
17	Perfume	NCT DoJaeJung	
17	The Calm Before the Storm	Tempest	
17	Predator	Lee Gi-kwang	
19	Seven Sins	Drippin	
19	[ Rorschach ] Part 1	Penomeco	
20	Archive of Emotions	Ryu Su-jeong	
20	Psycho Xybernetics : Turn Over	Giuk	
21	D-Day	Agust D	
22	La Diva	Sokhang	
24	FML	Seventeen	
25	Throw a Dice	Xodiac	
25	Down to Earth	Taeyang	
26	Prelude of Love Chapter 2. Growing Pains	Epex	
26	Oo-Li	Woodz	
26	Deadlock	Xdinary Heroes	
27	Time and Trace	Ha Hyun-sang	

==== May ====
Date	Album	Artist(s)	Ref.
1	Unforgiven	Le Sserafim	
2	The Colors of Love	Bang Yong-guk	
2	Wind and Wish	BtoB	
4	Take Off	iKon	
4	Aesthetic	+(Kr)ystal Eyes	
4	Deutda	Yang Ji-eun	
8	My World	Aespa	
8	Pygmalion	Oneus	
9	Per	Adya	
15	I Feel	(G)I-dle	
15	Beginning: The Wind Page	The Wind	
16	Liminality – Ep.Dream	Verivery	
17	Bit, Part.1	Younite	
17	Movie Star	Lee Mi-joo	
18	The Beginning: 飛上	ATBO	
22	Dark Blood	Enhypen	
22	Lights	Joohoney	
23	Icky	Kard	
24	Apocalypse: From Us	Dreamcatcher	
26	Ongoing	Kyungseo	
29	The Future Is Ours: Lost	AB6IX	
29	OK Episode 2: I'm OK	CIX	
30	Who!	BoyNextDoor	
30	Demo	Wonstein	
30	Beige	Kid Milli	

==== June ====
Date	Album	Artist(s)	Ref.
1	To Die For	B.I	
1	Gift	Hwang Chi-yeul	
2	5-Star	Stray Kids	
5	Shalala	Taeyong	
5	Unlock My World	Fromis 9	
7	Boyhood	TNX	
8	Harmony: All In	P1Harmony	
8	Impasto	Yoo Chae-hoon	
13	Ren'dezvous	Ren	
14	I Need Love	DKB	
16	The World EP.2: Outlaw	Ateez	
19	Realiez	Kang Daniel	
20	J.A.M	Kim Jae-hwan	
21	Girl's Round Part.2	Lapillus	
23	Overdrive	I.M	
26	Uncharted Drift	8Turn	
26	Hard	Shinee	
27	Frame	Han Seung-woo	
27	Hate XX	Choi Ye-na	
28	Play List	U-KISS	
28	2023 S/S Collection	Kim Sung-kyu	
29	Love Pt. 3: Eternally	WEi	

=== Third quarter ===
==== July ====
Date	Album	Artist(s)	Ref.
2	Twenty	Swan	
3	Nowitzki	Beenzino	
4	4SHO	Teen Top	
5	Kiss of Life	Kiss of Life	
6	UNI-Q	Queenz Eye	
7	Love Eventually	Samuel Seo	
7	(1)	Youra	
10	Youth in the Shade	Zerobaseone	
10	Exist	Exo	
11	A Midsummer Nmixx's Dream	Nmixx	
12	Version Up	Odd Eye Circle	
12	Sandara Park	Sandara Park	
17	ISTJ	NCT Dream	
19	I'm on It!	Ichillin'	
19	Boys Will Be Boys	Mirae	
21	Get Up	NewJeans	
24	Friend-Ship	Hori7on	
24	Golden Hourglass	Oh My Girl	
25	New Chapter	ILY:1	
25	The Unseen	Shownu X Hyungwon	
26	Summer Recipe	Soyou	
28	Reboot	Treasure	
31	Kill My Doubt	Itzy	
31	13egin	Infinite	

==== August ====
Date	Album	Artist(s)	Ref.
1	Form	Young Tak	
2	House of Tricky: How to Play	Xikers	
3	Two Rabbits	Mamamoo+	
3	New Mind	Nine.I	
3	Chapter 1. Our Youth	BXB	
7	Reality Show	Yunho	
7	Phantasy: Pt.1 Christmas in August	The Boyz	
7	Game Plan	Jeon So-mi	
9	Love All	Jo Yu-ri	
11	TAN Made [ ]	TAN	
14	We Love You	DKB	
16	Teenfresh	STAYC	
17	Fever	Lucy	
17	Lovelution	TripleS	
18	Zone	Jihyo	
18	All My Girls	Everglow	
18	Laffy Taffy	Primrose	
18	A.I.BAE	Le'v	
23	Ready, Set, Love	Yerin	
24	Asterum: The Shape of Things to Come	Plave	
24	Starlight	Secret Number	
28	Golden Age	NCT	
29	Us in the Summer	Cignature	
29	XOXO	Onewe	
30	Seoul Dreaming	H1-Key	

==== September ====
Date	Album	Artist(s)	Ref.
4	Letters with Notes	Young K	
4	Get a Guitar	Riize	
4	Why..	BoyNextDoor	
4	Door	Kim Se-jeong	
5	Festa	Purple Kiss	
6	JCFactory	Jaechan	
6	The Move: Street	Chaeyeon	
6	Boom	Rocket Punch	
7	Sage	FT Island	
8	Layover	V	
11	Sun Seeker	Cravity	
11	Good & Great	Key	
12	Toi Toi Toi	Heo Young-ji	
12	Harmony	Car, the Garden	
13	Hearts of the City	Lee Jin-ah	
14	Your City	Jung Yong-hwa	
14	Live	Mimiirose	
14	7+Up	El7z Up	
15	Loossemble	Loossemble	
15	Narcissus	Dawn	
18	Expectation	D.O.	
19	Target: Me	Evnne	
20	Vroom Vroom	Tempest	
21	New Tomorrow	Fantasy Boys	
25	Magic Hour	Kep1er	
26	La Dolce Vita	Oneus	

=== Fourth quarter ===
==== October ====
Date	Album	Artist(s)	Ref.
4	Prelude of Anxiety Chapter 2. 'Can We Surrender?'	Epex	
4	Love Effect	ONF	
4	Unfading Sens	Yesung	
6	Fact Check	NCT 127	
9	÷ (Nanugi)	Just B	
10	Robert	Bobby	
10	Ra Ta Ta	Ailee	
11	Livelock	Xdinary Heroes	
11	Honey or Spice	Lightsum	
11	An Iron Hand in a Velvet Glove	Jini	
11	Favorite	Pow	
11	On	82Major	
12	In the Mood	Wheein	
12	I Feel Hope	Jang Woo-hyuk	
13	The Name Chapter: Freefall	Tomorrow X Together	
13	I've Mine	Ive	
16	Untitled	Lee Seok-hoon	
17	Bit Part.2	Younite	
17	Identification	E'Last	
17	Weak	Loco	
18	Howl	Chuu	
18	History of Kingdom: Part VII. Jahan	Kingdom	
18	Macaroni Cheese	Young Posse	
18	Harmony from Discord	QWER	
23	Seventeenth Heaven	Seventeen	
23	Side-B: Memoirs of Echo Unseen	Billlie	
25	Arcade: O	Ghost9	
30	Guilty	Taemin	
30	Some	Moon Jong-up	
30	K	Heejin	

==== November ====
Date	Album	Artist(s)	Ref.
1	ColoRise	Weeekly	
2	Where Does Sasquatch Live? Part 2	Zior Park	
2	Versus	Viviz	
3	Golden	Jungkook	
6	Melting Point	Zerobaseone	
7	IYKYK	Omega X	
8	Born to Be XX	Kiss of Life	
8	Agassy	Soojin	
10	Love or Loved Part.2	B.I	
10	Rock-Star	Stray Kids	
10	Drama	Aespa	
13	Chill Kill	Red Velvet	
14	Wonderego	Crush	
15	Odd Hour	NTX	
15	Rise Waves	Giuk	
17	Orange Blood	Enhypen	
20	Phantasy: Pt.2 Sixth Sense	The Boyz	
21	Continuum	VIXX	
22	Odd-Venture	MCND	
22	VillainS	Dreamcatcher	
22	Rockyst	Rocky	
22	Beep Beep	Jessica	
23	Only One	Bang Ye-dam	
27	To. X	Taeyeon	
28	Whitree	Nam Woo-hyun	
30	Hip	DKB	
30	What's My Name	Mave:	
30	Moment	One Pact	

==== December ====
Date	Album	Artist(s)	Ref.
1	The World EP.Fin: Will	Ateez	
1	Time-Lapse	Yukika	
5	Boogie Man	Lucy	
5	Setlist	Soran	
6	Zip	Zion.T	
7	Last Winter	Heize	
8	Letter 1 - Adaeh	Fatou	
12	Merry Go Round	BOL4	
12	La Libertà	Libelante	
19	NJWMX	NewJeans	
20	Power Andre 99	Silica Gel	
22	Be There for Me	NCT 127	
26	20&2	TVXQ	

== Deaths ==
- Moonbin, 25, singer and actor
- Choi Sung-bong, 33, singer
