= Timeless (single album) =

Single album by Onewe
- Released: May 20, 2022
- Genre: Rock
- Length: 15:56
- Language: Korean
- Label: RBW; Kakao Entertainment

Onewe chronology
Planet Nine: Voyager (2022)	Timeless (2022)	Studio We: Recording #3 (2022)

Singles from Timeless
- 1. "Roommate" Released: May 20, 2022

Music videos
- "Roommate" on YouTube

Timeless (stylized in all caps; Korean: 시간을 담은 작은 방; RR: Siganeul dameun jageun bang; lit. 'a small room filled with time') is the first special single album by the South Korean band Onewe. The album was released by RBW on May 20, 2022, and distributed by Kakao Entertainment. Timeless was released as a special album to commemorate three years since the band made their re-debut under the name Onewe. It consists of four tracks, including the lead single "Roommate" which tells Onewe's story, the 2022 version of the single "Starlight" which the band originally released in 2016 under their former name M.A.S 0094, as well as CD-only demo versions of both songs.

== Background and release ==
Onewe originally self-formed the band under the name M.A.S 0094, meaning Make A Sound plus the birth years of the youngest (2000) and oldest (1994) members, beginning busking together on streets of Hongdae around May of 2015. On November 10, 2016, they released their second single "Starlight" to celebrate 100 days since their official debut as M.A.S 0094. The song was then included in the band's second EP Make Some Noise released on January 6, 2017.

On April 1, 2017, M.A.S 0094 signed an exclusive artist contract with RBW and their name was shortened to MAS, before being again changed to Onewe in June of 2018, and finally re-debuted with the name Onewe on May 13, 2019.

On May 10, 2022, it was announced through a teaser that Onewe would be releasing their first special album Timeless on May 20. The album was released to commemorate their third anniversary since re-debuting as Onewe, with the lead single "Roommate", as well as a 2022 version of their M.A.S 0094 single "Starlight".

"Roommate" is a self-composed song by the band's leader Yonghoon, with member CyA also participating in writing lyrics, and tells the story of Onewe who have spent many years together. The song was revealed for the first time through a live performance at the band's O! NEW E!volution II Encore concert on May 15 before the album's official release at 6pm KST on May 20.

== Track listing ==
Timeless digital edition

No.	Title	Lyrics	Music	Arrangement	Length
1.	"Roommate" (룸메이트)	Yonghoon, Im Do-hwan, CyA	Yonghoon, Im Do-hwan	Jeon Da-woon (RBW), Yonghoon	3:44
2.	"Starlight" (별보다 빛나는) (2022 ver.)	Im Do-hwan	Im Do-hwan	Jeon Da-woon (RBW), CocoDubuPapa (RBW)	3:37
Total length:					7:21

Timeless demo tracks

No.	Title	Lyrics	Music	Arrangement	Length
3.	"Roommate" (룸메이트) (Original Topline ver.)	Yonghoon, Im Do-hwan	Yonghoon, Im Do-hwan		3:55
4.	"Starlight" (별보다 빛나는) (Live ver.)	Im Do-hwan	Im Do-hwan	Jeon Da-woon (RBW), M.A.S 0094	4:40
Total length:					15:56

== Charts ==
Chart (2022)	Peak position
South Korean Albums (Gaon)	14

== Release history ==
Country	Date	Format	Label	Ref
Various	May 20, 2022	Digital download, streaming	RBW; Kakao Entertainment	
South Korea	May 20, 2022	CD	RBW	
