= Gravity (Onewe album) =

Studio album by Onewe
- Released: January 28, 2023
- Recorded: 2022
- Genre: Rock
- Length: 39:56
- Language: Korean
- Label: RBW; Kakao Entertainment

Onewe chronology
Studio We: Recording #3 (2022)	Gravity (2023)	XOXO (2023)

Singles from Gravity
- 1. "Gravity" Released: January 28, 2023

Music videos
- "Gravity" on YouTube

Gravity (stylized in all caps) is the first English studio album by the South Korean band Onewe. The album was released by RBW on January 28, 2023, and distributed by Kakao Entertainment. It consists of eleven songs, including the new English title track "Gravity", along with ten English versions of songs the band had previously written and released in Korean.

It is the second album, following Studio We: Recording #3, that was prepared in advance by the band as a complete group to be released during the mandatory military service of members Yonghoon and Kanghyun.

== Background and release ==
On July 12, 2022, Yonghoon enlisted in the military to serve his mandatory military service, followed by Kanghyun who enlisted on August 2, just three weeks apart.

On October 4, 2022, Onewe released a new song "Still Here" as a pre-release single for their third demo album Studio We: Recording #3 which was then released on October 18. "Still Here" was self-composed by Yonghoon and featured all five members, with both the single and album recorded and prepared in advance as a complete group prior to Yonghoon and Kanghyun's military enlistments.

On January 16, 2023, Onewe released a teaser announcing the release of their first English full-length album Gravity on January 28 at 6pm KST.

The album presented the band's first English song "Gravity" as the title track, which was again self-composed by Yonghoon and co-composed by Kanghyun prior to their military enlistments and included all five members. Member CyA also worked on the song's production, as well as translating the lyrics to English alongside lyricists from Makeumine Works (MUMW) for his rap section. The rest of the album was also prepared in advance before enlistments, which included recording ten English versions of songs the band had previously written and released in Korean, translated to English by the team at MUMW and Essie.

The album was released on January 28, 2023, alongside a music video for the title track "Gravity" featuring all five members.

== Track listing ==
No.	Title	Lyrics	Music	Arrangement	Length
1.	"Gravity"	Yonghoon, CyA, Lee Joo Hee (MUMW), se.on (MUMW), Y0UNG (MUMW)	Yonghoon, Jeon Da-woon (RBW), CyA, Kanghyun	Yonghoon, Jeon Da-woon, CyA	3:42
2.	"Aurora" (English ver.)	Kanghyun, Yonghoon, CyA, Lee Joo Hee (MUMW), ReMi (MUMW)	Kanghyun, Jeon Da-woon (RBW)	Jeon Da-woon (RBW), Kanghyun, CocoDubuPapa (RBW)	3:42
3.	"Parting" (English ver.)	Kanghyun, CyA, Lee Joo Hee (MUMW), ReMi (MUMW)	Kanghyun, Jeon Da-woon (RBW), CyA	Jeon Da-woon (RBW), Kanghyun, Harin	4:00
4.	"Regulus" (English ver.)	Kanghyun, CyA, Heun-geul, Lee Joo Hee (MUMW), Im Hye Rin (MUMW)	Kanghyun, CyA, Jeon Da-woon (RBW)	Jeon Da-woon (RBW), Kanghyun	3:45
5.	"Montage_" (English ver.)	CyA, Yonghoon, Lee Joo Hee (MUMW), Kim Eung Ju (MUMW)	CyA, Yonghoon, Jeon Da-woon (RBW), CocoDubuPapa (RBW)	CocoDubuPapa (RBW), CyA, Harin, Kanghyun	3:44
6.	"Rain to Be" (English ver.)	Kanghyun, CyA, Lee Joo Hee (MUMW), Seo Ha Mi (MUMW)	Kanghyun, Jeon Da-woon (RBW), CyA	Jeon Da-woon (RBW), Kanghyun	3:16
7.	"Ring On My Ears" (English ver.)	CyA, Lee Joo Hee (MUMW), ReMi (MUMW)	CyA, Jeon Da-woon (RBW)	Jeon Da-woon (RBW), CyA, Kanghyun	3:44
8.	"Trauma" (English ver.)	CyA, Yonghoon, Lee Joo Hee (MUMW), LEESIDAE (MUMW)	CyA, Yonghoon, CocoDubuPapa (RBW)	CocoDubuPapa (RBW), Kanghyun, Harin, Cya	3:58
9.	"Logo" (English ver.)	Yonghoon, Harin, Dongmyeong, CyA, Lee Joo Hee (MUMW), Bisom (MUMW)	Yonghoon, Kanghyun, CyA, CocoDubuPapa (RBW)	CocoDubuPapa (RBW), Yonghoon, Kanghyun, CyA	3:13
10.	"End of Spring" (English ver.)	Kim Do-hoon (RBW), Seo Young-bae (RBW), CyA, Essie	Kim Do-hoon (RBW), Seo Young-bae (RBW), CyA	Kim Do-hoon (RBW), Jeon Da-woon (RBW)	3:29
11.	"Crazy good" (English ver.)	CyA, Yonghoon, Lee Joo Hee (MUMW), roze (MUMW)	CyA, Jeon Da-woon (RBW), Yonghoon	Jeon Da-woon (RBW), CyA	3:17
Total length:					39:56

== Charts ==
Chart (2023)	Peak position
South Korean Albums (Circle)	21

== Release history ==
Country	Date	Format	Label	Ref
South Korea	January 28, 2023	CD, digital download, streaming	RBW; Kakao Entertainment	
Various	January 28, 2023	CD, digital download, streaming	RBW; Kakao Entertainment	
