= Studio We: Recording 4 =

Studio We: Recording #4

Demo album by Onewe
- Released: January 30, 2026
- Language: Korean
- Label: RBW; Kakao Entertainment

Onewe chronology
Maze: Ad Astra (2025)	Studio We: Recording #4 (2026)	點: The Quiver (2026)

Singles from Studio We: Recording #4
- 1. "Ferris Wheel" Released: January 14, 2026

Music videos
- "Ferris Wheel" on YouTube

Studio We: Recording #4 is the fourth demo album by the South Korean band Onewe. It was released on January 30, 2026, and consists of 15 tracks, including the pre-released single "Ferris Wheel" and its instrumental, along with CD-only demo versions of 13 songs from the band's previous releases.

== Background and release ==
On January 5, 2026, a schedule plan was released announcing Onewe's new song “Ferris Wheel” to be released as a digital single on January 14, ahead of the release of Studio We: Recording #4 on January 30. "Ferris Wheel" was then included as the lead single for the demo album, which was released as a physical album including demo versions of songs from Onewe's previous releases: Planet Nine: Isotropy, We: Dream Chaser and Off Road.

== Track listing ==
"Ferris Wheel" pre-release

No.	Title	Lyrics	Music	Arrangement	Length
1.	"Ferris Wheel" (관람차)	Giuk, Bydor Archive	Giuk, Hashin, Bydor Archive	Hashin	3:35
2.	"Ferris Wheel" (관람차; instrumental)		Giuk, Hashin, Bydor Archive	Hashin	3:35
Total length:					7:10

Studio We: Recording #4 demo tracks

No.	Title	Lyrics	Music	Arrangement	Length
3.	"Meteor Shower" (한여름 밤 유성우) (7.29)	Giuk	Giuk	Giuk
4.	"A Piece of You" (유일한 사랑이니까; 0번째니까 ver.)	Yonghoon	Yonghoon	Yonghoon
5.	"Endless" (순애) (Draft Guide)	Kanghyun	Kanghyun	Kanghyun
6.	"Kiss in the Rain" (lofi ver.)	Dongmyeong	Jeon Da-woon (RBW), Dongmyeong, CocoDubuPapa (RBW)	Jeon Da-woon (RBW)
7.	"Beautiful Ashes" (추억의 소각장; Guide Ver. 2)	Yonghoon	Jeon Da-woon (RBW), Yonghoon	Jeon Da-woon (RBW)
8.	"Dreamcatcher" (청천을; 2021)	Giuk	Giuk	Giuk
9.	"The Starry Night" (별 헤는 밤; The Starry Night Sketch)	Kanghyun	Kanghyun	Kanghyun
10.	"All the Things I Love" (눈이 부시게; bossa nova ver.)	Dong Myeong	Jeon Da-woon (RBW), Dongmyeong	Jeon Da-woon (RBW)
11.	"Pleasant" (다시 만나서 반가워; Original Structure)	Harin	Harin
12.	"Shoot It Out" (양자역학)	Kanghyun	Kanghyun	Kanghyun
13.	"Rise Again" (오래된 음악가의 추억; Nostalgia Demo Ver.)	Harin, Giuk	Harin, X3RO
14.	"Count the Stars" (별 세는 너) (Guitar Rough)	Yonghoon	Yonghoon	Yonghoon
15.	"Solar Halo Ring" (바다에 적신 햇무리 반지; Wedding Ver.)	Giuk, Bydor Archive	Giuk, Kanghyun, Gray Dot, Bydor Archive	Gray Dot

== Charts ==
=== Weekly charts ===
Weekly chart performance for Studio We: Recording #4
Chart (2026)	Peak position
South Korean Albums (Circle)	13

=== Monthly charts ===
Monthly chart performance for Studio We: Recording #4
Chart (2026)	Position
South Korean Albums (Circle)	49

== Release history ==
Country	Date	Format	Version	Label	Ref
Various	January 14, 2026	Digital download, streaming	"Ferris Wheel"	RBW; Kakao Entertainment	
South Korea	January 30, 2026	CD	Studio We: Recording #4	RBW	
