= Secret Santa (single album) =

Single album by Onewe
- Released: December 23, 2024
- Studio: RBW (Seoul); Giuk (Seoul)
- Genre: Rock; carol
- Length: 7:39
- Language: Korean
- Label: RBW

Onewe chronology
Off Road (2024)	Secret Santa (2024)	We: Dream Chaser (2025)

Singles from Secret Santa
- 1. "We X Mas" Released: December 23, 2024

Music videos
- "We X Mas" on YouTube

Secret Santa is the third single album by the South Korean band Onewe. The album was released by RBW on December 23, 2024. It consists of two tracks, including the lead single "We X Mas" and another track "Actor".

== Background and release ==
On October 26, 2024, Onewe announced they would be holding their O! New E!volution IV concert at Yes24 Live Hall on November 30 and December 1, including new arrangements and unreleased songs fit for the year-end. Through the concert, they revealed the complete five-member version of "We X Mas", a Christmas carol which the band has previously written and performed as three members in 2022 during the mandatory military service of members Yonghoon and Kanghyun. They also performed "Actor", a song which the band had performed unreleased since 2018. On December 16, Onewe announced their third special album Secret Santa with "We X Mas" and "Actor" as a Christmas gift for their fans, set to be released on December 23, 2024.

== Track listing ==
Secret Santa track listing
No.	Title	Lyrics	Music	Arrangement	Length
1.	"We X Mas" (크리스마스는 이래야지)	Giuk; Dongmyeong; Harin	Giuk; Dongmyeong; Harin	Jeon Da-woon (RBW); Giuk	3:48
2.	"Actor"	Jeon; Yonghoon; Giuk	Jeon; Yonghoon; Giuk	Jeon; Kanghyun; Harin	3:50
Total length:					7:39

== Charts ==
=== Weekly charts ===
Weekly chart performance for Secret Santa
Chart (2025)	Peak position
South Korean Albums (Circle)	9

=== Monthly charts ===
Monthly chart performance for Secret Santa
Chart (2025)	Position
South Korean Albums (Circle)	42

== Release history ==
Region	Date	Format	Label	Ref
Various	December 23, 2024	Digital download; streaming	RBW	
South Korea	January 3, 2025	CD	RBW	
