= XOXO (Onewe single album) =

Single album by Onewe
- Released: August 29, 2023
- Genre: Rock
- Length: 15:08
- Language: Korean
- Label: RBW; Kakao Entertainment

Onewe chronology
Gravity (2023)	XOXO (2023)	Planet Nine: Isotropy (2024)

Singles from XOXO
- 1. "Salty Boy" Released: August 29, 2023; 2. "Omnipresent" Released: August 29, 2023

Music videos
- "Salty Boy" on YouTube
- "Omnipresent" on YouTube

XOXO is the second special single album by the South Korean band Onewe. The album was released by RBW on August 29, 2023, and distributed by Kakao Entertainment. XOXO was released as a special unit album by three members of the band, Harin, Dongmyeong and Giuk, during the mandatory military service of members Yonghoon and Kanghyun. It consists of four tracks, including two singles, "Salty Boy" by Dongmyeong and Giuk and "Omnipresent" by Harin and Giuk, along with the instrumentals for each.

== Background and release ==
The two singles in the album were both performed as unit stages at Onewe's concerts prior to their official release, with Dongmyeong and Giuk first performing "Salty Boy" at Onewe's O! NEW E!volution II Encore concert held in May, 2022, and Harin and Giuk performing "Omnipresent" as their unit song at the band's 2022 Christmas concert ONE day in the WEnter. Giuk originally released a demo version "Omnipresent" on his SoundCloud under its Korean title dated May 28, 2019.

In mid-2022, members Yonghoon and Kanghyun enlisted together to complete their mandatory military service. Onewe then released two albums, Studio We: Recording #3 in October 2022 and Gravity in January 2023, which were prepared in advance as a complete group prior to their enlistments. The band were then to fill the remainder of the enlistment period with solo and unit activities until their return as a whole group in 2024, with Giuk then making his solo debut in April, 2023 with his first EP Psycho Xybernetics : Turn Over, and Dongmyeong making his musical debut in May, 2023.

On August 21, 2023, a teaser was posted announcing the release on Onewe's second special album XOXO on August 29, which was to be a unit album by the band's three active members Harin, Dongmyeong and Giuk.

The full track list was announced on August 22, revealing the album's two singles: "Salty Boy" self-composed by Giuk and Dongmyeong, and "Omnipresent" self-composed by Giuk and Harin.

The album was released along with a music video for the lead single "Salty Boy" on August 29 at 6pm KST, following which a performance music video for the second single "Omnipresent" was also subsequently released on August 31. While the studio release of "Salty Boy" only included the members Dongmyeong and Giuk, Harin also participated in a live performance of the song which was released on YouTube on August 30. In addition, the studio recording of "Omnipresent" also featured a guitar solo which was recorded by Kanghyun prior to his enlistment.

== Track listing ==
No.	Title	Lyrics	Music	Arrangement	Length
1.	"Salty Boy"	Giuk, Dongmyeong	Giuk, Dongmyeong, Jeon Da-woon (RBW)	Jeon Da-woon (RBW), Giuk	4:04
2.	"Omnipresent" (동서남북)	Giuk	Giuk, Harin, CocoDubuPapa (RBW)	CocoDubuPapa (RBW), Giuk, Harin	3:30
3.	"Salty Boy (Inst.)"		Giuk, Dongmyeong, Jeon Da-woon (RBW)	Jeon Da-woon (RBW), Giuk	4:04
4.	"Omnipresent (Inst.)"		Giuk, Harin, CocoDubuPapa (RBW)	CocoDubuPapa (RBW), Giuk, Harin	3:30
Total length:					15:08

== Charts ==
Chart (2023)	Peak position
South Korean Albums (Circle)	16

== Release history ==
Country	Date	Format	Label	Ref
South Korea	August 29, 2023	CD	RBW; Kakao Entertainment	
Various	August 29, 2023	Digital download, streaming	RBW; Kakao Entertainment	
