= Maze: Ad Astra =

EP by Onewe
- Released: October 7, 2025
- Recorded: 2025
- Studio: RBW, Giuk, Hive Music
- Genre: Rock
- Length: 25:56
- Language: Korean
- Label: RBW; Kakao

Onewe chronology
We: Dream Chaser (2025)	Maze: Ad Astra (2025)	Studio We: Recording #4 (2026)

Singles from Maze: Ad Astra
- 1. "Maze" Released: October 7, 2025

Music videos
- "Maze" on YouTube

Maze: Ad Astra is the fourth extended play by the South Korean band Onewe. It was released by RBW and distributed by Kakao Entertainment on October 7, 2025. It consists of seven songs, including the lead single "Maze".

== Track listing ==
Maze : Ad Astra track listing
No.	Title	Lyrics	Music	Arrangement	Length
1.	"Lucky 12" (행운의 달)	Yonghoon	Yonghoon, Jeon Da-woon (RBW)	Jeon Da-woon (RBW), Yonghoon	3:37
2.	"Maze" (미로)	Giuk, Bydor Archive	Giuk, Bydor Archive	Bydor Archive	4:09
3.	"UFO" (미확인 비행체)	Kanghyun	Kanghyun, Gray Dot	Gray Dot, Park Jun-young, Kanghyun	3:30
4.	"Hide & Seek" (숨바꼭질)	Giuk, Bydor Archive	Giuk, Jxhyung, Bydor Archive	Jxhyung	3:23
5.	"Trace" (흔적)	Harin, Giuk	X3RO, Harin, Kanghyun	X3RO, Harin, Kanghyun, Jang Yeun	4:19
6.	"Diary" (너와 나, 그리고...; 雕刻)	Harin	Kim Yein, X3RO	Harin, X3RO, Kim Yein, Kanghyun, Bae Hyung-ho	3:09
7.	"Beyond the Storm" (비바람을 건너)	Dongmyeong, Giuk, X3RO	Dongmyeong, X3RO	X3RO, Jang Yeun, Bae Hyung-ho	3:49
Total length:					25:56

== Accolades ==
Music program awards
Song	Program	Date	Ref.
"Maze"	Show Champion	October 15, 2025	
"Maze"	ENA K-Pop Up Chart Show	October 31, 2025	

== Charts ==
Chart performance for Maze: Ad Astra
Chart (2025)	Peak position
South Korean Albums (Circle)	3
