= 點: The Quiver =

Single album by Onewe
- Released: May 28, 2026
- Genre: Rock
- Language: Korean
- Labels: RBW; Kakao M

Onewe chronology
Studio We: Recording #4 (2026)	點: The Quiver (2026)	面: Unknown Atlas (2026)

Singles from 點: The Quiver
- 1. "Icarus" Released: May 28, 2026

Music videos
- "Icarus" on YouTube

點: The Quiver is the second single album by the South Korean band Onewe. The album was released by RBW and distributed by Kakao Entertainment on May 28, 2026. It consists of four songs, including the lead single "Icarus".

== Background and release ==
On May 15, Onewe released a schedule plan announcing their second single album 點: The Quiver as the beginning of a new album series connecting points (點), lines (線) and planes (面). The series will continue with a digital single 線: The Wake on July 27, culminating with the release of the band's third full-length album 面: Unknown Atlas on August 19.

== Track listing ==
No.	Title	Lyrics	Music	Arrangement	Length
1.	"Coordinates" (좌표)	Kanghyun, Giuk, Bydor Archive	Kanghyun, Bydor Archive, Gu Ye-eun	Bydor Archive, Kanghyun	3:40
2.	"Compass" (나침반)	Giuk, Bydor Archive	Giuk, Bydor Archive, wez	Bydor Archive	3:50
3.	"Icarus"	Kanghyun, Giuk, Bydor Archive	Kanghyun, Bydor Archive, wez	Bydor Archive, Kanghyun	3:50
4.	"Fly"	Dongmyeong, Giuk, Bydor Archive	Dongmyeong, Giuk, Bydor Archive, wez	Bydor Archive, Dongmyeong	3:42
Total length:					15:02

== Charts ==
Chart performance for 點: The Quiver
Chart (2026)	Peak position
South Korean Albums (Circle)	15
