= We: Dream Chaser =

Studio album by Onewe
- Released: March 5, 2025
- Studio: RBW, Giuk, Hive Music
- Genre: Rock
- Length: 37:43
- Language: Korean
- Label: RBW; Kakao

Onewe chronology
Secret Santa (2024)	We: Dream Chaser (2025)	Maze: Ad Astra (2025)

Singles from We: Dream Chaser
- 1. "The Starry Night" Released: March 5, 2025

Music videos
- "The Starry Night" on YouTube

We: Dream Chaser is the second studio album by the South Korean band Onewe. It was released by RBW and distributed by Kakao Entertainment on March 5, 2025. It consists of eleven songs, including the lead single "The Starry Night".

== Background and release ==
During Onewe's 2024 4th live concert O New E!volution IV, held on November 30 and December 1, 2024 at Yes24 Live Hall in Seoul, the band revealed their new song "Sole Star" through a live performance as a teaser for their upcoming album.

On February 13, 2025, Onewe released a teaser announcing their second full album We: Dream Chaser, set to be released on March 5. Five years after the release of their first studio album One, We: Dream Chaser expands the 'One' to 'We' reflecting the five members' more evolved musical world.

On February 16, the full track list was revealed, consisting of a total of eleven songs songs, written and composed by all five members of the band. The lead single was written by guitarist Kanghyun, inspired by the painting The Starry Night by Vincent van Gogh.

Following the release of the album, the band embarked on their first world tour 2025 Onewe World Tour 'O! New E!volution IV' on March 21 in Vietnam, followed by 20 cities across the United States and Canada from April 6-May 9, with an encore in Seoul on June 14–15, then continuing their world tour in Taipei on July 26.

== Track listing ==
We: Dream Chaser track listing
No.	Title	Lyrics	Music	Arrangement	Length
1.	"Alice"	Kanghyun, Giuk	Kanghyun, Jeon Da-woon (RBW)	Jeon Da-woon (RBW), Kanghyun	2:51
2.	"The Starry Night" (별 헤는 밤)	Kanghyun, Giuk	Kanghyun, Jeon Da-woon (RBW)	Jeon Da-woon (RBW), Kanghyun	3:17
3.	"Evildoer" (악당은 영웅의 변신을 기다려준다)	Giuk, Bydor Archive, Jxhyung	Giuk, Jxhyung, Bydor Archive	Jxhyung	3:04
4.	"Traffic Love" (일방통행; 一方通行)	Giuk, Bydor Archive	Giuk, Bydor Archive, wez	Bydor Archive	3:03
5.	"Coincidence" (우연의 일치)	Yonghoon	Yonghoon, Jeon Da-woon (RBW)	Jeon Da-woon (RBW), Yonghoon	3:38
6.	"Endless" (순애, 純愛)	Kanghyun	Kanghyun	Kanghyun	2:50
7.	"Rise Again" (오래된 음악가의 추억)	Harin, Giuk	Harin, X3RO	Harin, X3RO	3:47
8.	"Dreamcatcher" (청천을; 靑天乙)	Giuk, Bydor Archive	Giuk, Gray Dot, Bydor Archive	Gray Dot, Giuk	3:58
9.	"All the things I love" (눈이 부시게)	Dongmyeong, Giuk	Jeon Da-woon (RBW), Dongmyeong	Jeon Da-woon (RBW)	2:58
10.	"Indelible" (사라지지 않는 기억이 있다면)	Harin	Gray Dot, Harin, Yonghoon	Gray Dot, Harin, Kanghyun	4:25
11.	"Sole Star" (검은 별)	Giuk, Bydor Archive	Giuk, Bydor Archive, wez, Gu Ye-eun	Bydor Archive	3:48
Total length:					37:43

== Charts ==
Chart performance for We: Dream Chaser
Chart (2024)	Peak position
South Korean Albums (Circle)	9
