= Studio We: Recording 3 =

Studio We: Recording #3

Demo album by Onewe
- Released: October 18, 2022
- Genre: Rock
- Length: 29:05
- Language: Korean
- Label: RBW; Kakao Entertainment

Onewe chronology
Timeless (2022)	Studio We: Recording #3 (2022)	Gravity (2023)

Singles from Studio We: Recording #3
- 1. "Still Here" Released: October 4, 2022

Music videos
- "Still Here" on YouTube

Studio We: Recording #3 is the third demo album by the South Korean band Onewe. The album was released by RBW on October 18, 2022, and distributed by Kakao Entertainment. It consists of 8 tracks, including the pre-released single "Still Here" and its instrumental, along with CD-only demo versions of the six songs from the band's previous EP Planet Nine : Voyager.

It is the first of two albums, followed by Gravity, which were prepared in advance by the band as a complete group to be released during the mandatory military service of members Yonghoon and Kanghyun.

== Background and release ==
On January 4, 2022, Onewe released their second EP Planet Nine: Voyager, consisting of six songs written and composed by each of the members of the band.

On July 12, 2022, Yonghoon enlisted in the military to serve his mandatory military service, followed by Kanghyun who enlisted on August 2, just three weeks apart.

On September 24, Onewe posted a teaser announcing the release of a new song "Still Here" on October 4, 2022, at 6pm KST, which was self-composed by Yonghoon and recorded in advance as a complete group prior to his and Kanghyun's enlistments. The digital single was released at 6pm KST on October 4 alongside a music video for "Still Here" featuring all five members.

On September 25, they released a schedule plan confirming that "Still Here" was to be a pre-released digitally and then included as the lead single for Onewe's third demo album Studio We: Recording #3 which would be released as a physical album on October 18.

== Track listing ==
"Still Here" pre-release

No.	Title	Lyrics	Music	Arrangement	Length
1.	"Still Here" (기어이 또)	Yonghoon	Yonghoon, CocoDubuPapa (RBW)	CocoDubuPapa (RBW)	3:39
2.	"Still Here" (Instrumental)		Yonghoon, CocoDubuPapa (RBW)	CocoDubuPapa (RBW)	3:39
Total length:					7:19

Studio We : Recording #3 demo tracks

No.	Title	Lyrics	Music	Arrangement	Length
3.	"Universe_" (너의 우주는) (My First Universe Ver.)	Yonghoon	Yonghoon	Yonghoon	3:48
4.	"Envision_" (우물 속 아이) (Ani Vibe Ver.)	Harin, CyA	Harin	Harin	4:10
5.	"Montage_" (잠결에서라도 너가 계속 흘렀으면) (210810)	CyA, Yonghoon	CyA, Yonghoon	CyA, Yonghoon	3:48
6.	"Trigger_" (시발점) (201007)	Dongmyeong	Dongmyeong, Kanghyun	Dongmyeong, Kanghyun	1:22
7.	"Orbit_" (궤도) (Piano Ver.)	Kanghyun, CyA	Kanghyun	Kanghyun	3:46
8.	"From_" (선물할게요) (One take Ver.)	Yonghoon, Im Do-hwan	Yonghoon, Im Do-hwan	Yonghoon	4:50
Total length:					29:05

== Charts ==
Chart (2022)	Peak position
South Korean Albums (Circle)	30

== Release history ==
Country	Date	Format	Version	Label	Ref
Various	October 4, 2022	Digital download, streaming	"Still Here"	RBW; Kakao Entertainment	
South Korea	October 18, 2022	CD	Studio We : Recording #3	RBW	
