= 1/4 (single album) =

Single album by Onewe
- Released: May 13, 2019
- Recorded: 2019
- Genre: Rock
- Length: 15:13
- Language: Korean
- Labels: RBW; Stone Music Entertainment

Onewe chronology
| Make Some Noise (2017) | 1/4 (2019) | 2/4 (2019) |

Singles from 1/4
- 1. "Reminisce About All" Released: May 13, 2019

Music videos
- "Reminisce about All" on YouTube
- "Ring on my Ears" on YouTube
- "0&4" on YouTube
- "Reminisce about All" (Japanese ver.) on YouTube

1/4 is the debut single album by the South Korean alternative rock band Onewe under RBW. The album was released on May 13, 2019, and consists of the members' own compositions with a total of four tracks, including the lead single "Reminisce about All". The album release marks the band's official re-debut as Onewe under RBW, following their original debut as M.A.S 0094.

== Background and release ==
In June 2017, RBW confirmed they had signed an exclusive contract with M.A.S 0094, referred to simply as MAS. In June 2018, RBW announced that MAS would debut again under the new name Onewe. In April 2019, RBW announced Onewe's debut single album, consisting of the members' own compositions, would be released on May 13, 2019, beginning of a series of single album releases leading up to the release of the band's first full album.

The single album 1/4 was released along with a music video for the lead single "Reminisce about All" on May 13, following which, music videos for the songs "Ring on my Ears" and "0&4" from the album were also subsequently released on May 15 and May 17 respectively.

The Japanese version of the album, titled Reminisce about All after the title track, was released on June 7, 2019, containing the Japanese versions of the three songs from 1/4.

== Track listing ==
1/4 – Standard Edition

| No. | Title | Lyrics | Music | Arrangement | Length |
|---|---|---|---|---|---|
| 1. | "Ring on my Ears" (귀걸이가 나를 때리게) | CyA | CyA, Jeon Da-woon (RBW) | Jeon Da-woon (RBW), CyA, Kanghyun | 3:45 |
| 2. | "Reminisce about All" (다 추억) | Yonghoon | Yonghoon, Jeon Da-woon (RBW) | Jeon Da-woon (RBW), Yonghoon | 4:12 |
| 3. | "0&4" (공과 사) | Kanghyun, Yonghoon, CyA | Kanghyun, Yonghoon, Jeon Da-woon (RBW) | Jeon Da-woon (RBW), Kanghyun, CyA | 3:30 |
| 4. | "Ring on my Ears (Remix)" (귀걸이가 나를 때리게) | CyA | CyA, Jeon Da-woon (RBW) | Jeon Da-woon (RBW), CyA | 3:44 |
| Total length: | | | | | 15:13 |

Reminisce about All - Japanese Edition

| No. | Title | Lyrics | Music | Arrangement | Length |
|---|---|---|---|---|---|
| 1. | "Reminisce about All" (Japanese ver.) | Yonghoon, SUKA | Yonghoon, Jeon Da-woon (RBW) | Jeon Da-woon (RBW), Yonghoon | 4:12 |
| 2. | "Koushikondou" (公私混同) | Kanghyun, Yonghoon, CyA, Hwang Sung-jin | Kanghyun, Yonghoon, Jeon Da-woon (RBW) | Jeon Da-woon (RBW), Kanghyun, CyA | 3:30 |
| 3. | "Piasugabokuwobutsuyouni" (ピアスが僕をぶつように) | CyA, Hwang Sung-jin | CyA, Jeon Da-woon (RBW) | Jeon Da-woon (RBW), CyA, Kanghyun | 3:45 |
| Total length: | | | | | 11:29 |

== Release history ==
| Country | Date | Format | Version | Label | Ref |
|---|---|---|---|---|---|
| South Korea | May 13, 2019 | Digital, download | Standard | RBW; Stone Music Entertainment | |
| Various | May 13, 2019 | Digital, download | Standard | RBW; Stone Music Entertainment | |
| Japan | June 7, 2019 | CD, digital, download | Japanese | RBW; GEMS Records; KISS Entertainment | |
| Various | June 7, 2019 | Digital, download | Japanese | RBW; GEMS Records; KISS Entertainment | |
