= 2/4 (single album) =

Single album by Onewe
- Released: August 29, 2019
- Recorded: 2019
- Genre: Rock
- Length: 13:18
- Language: Korean
- Label: RBW; Stone Music Entertainment

Onewe chronology
1/4 (2019)	2/4 (2019)	3/4 (2020)

Singles from 2/4
- 1. "Regulus" Released: August 29, 2019

Music videos
- "Regulus" on YouTube
- "Regulus" (Japanese ver.) on YouTube
- "Feeling Good" (2019 ver.) on YouTube

2/4 is the second single album by the South Korean band Onewe. It was released by RBW on August 29, 2019, and distributed by Stone Music Entertainment. It consists of four tracks, including the lead single "Regulus".

== Release and promotion ==
On August 16, 2019, RBW announced the upcoming release of Onewe's second single album 2/4 on August 29. The full track list was revealed on August 26 with the lead single "Regulus" (야행성; literally "nocturnal"), written by the band's guitarist Kanghyun inspired by the novella The Little Prince; along with "Love Me" (내가 처음 만져본 강아지; literally "the first puppy I ever touched"), a song written by the band's leader and main vocalist Yonghoon about the first time he managed to overcome his fear of dogs enough pet a puppy, expressing the shock and overwhelming affection he felt for the puppy; and the 2019 version of "Feeling Good", which the band originally released in 2016 under their former name M.A.S 0094 as the lead single for their EP Feeling Good Day.

In contrast to their official re-debut with their previous single album 1/4, the band promoted 2/4 through music shows, making their first music show appearance as Onewe (Note: The band previously promoted on music shows under their former name M.A.S 0094, with their original music show debut on The Show on August 2, 2016.) with their performance of "Regulus" on M Countdown on August 29, 2019. As such, broadcasts labelled this as Onewe's "debut stage" on music shows.

The Japanese version of the album, named Regulus after the title track, was released on October 25, 2019, containing the Japanese version of "Regulus" alongside the other Korean tracks on the album.

On May 13, 2021, the two-year anniversary since Onewe's re-debut, the band released a special music video for "Feeling Good (2019 ver.)", a recreation of their original music video for "Feeling Good" released in 2016.

On February 25, 2023, "Love Me" was featured as the quiz in the popular South Korean variety show Amazing Saturday. The band subsequently released a live clip of a performance of the song from their O! New E!volution II concert the following day.

== Track listing ==
2/4 – Standard Edition

No.	Title	Lyrics	Music	Arrangement	Length
1.	"Love Me" (내가 처음 만져본 강아지)	Yonghoon, CyA	Kim Do-hoon (RBW), Yonghoon, Kanghyun	Kim Do-hoon (RBW), Jeon Da-woon (RBW)	3:10
2.	"Regulus" (야행성)	Kanghyun, CyA, Heungeul	Kanghyun, CyA, Jeon Da-woon (RBW)	Jeon Da-woon (RBW), Kanghyun	3:42
3.	"Feeling Good (2019 ver.)"	Yonghoon, Kanghyun, Harin, Dongmyeong, CyA	Yonghoon, Kanghyun, Harin, Dongmyeong, CyA	Jeon Da-woon (RBW), Kanghyun, Harin, CyA	2:42
4.	"Regulus (Inst.)" (야행성)		Kanghyun, CyA, Jeon Da-woon (RBW)	Jeon Da-woon (RBW), Kanghyun	3:42
Total length:					13:18

Regulus – Japanese Edition

No.	Title	Lyrics	Music	Arrangement	Length
1.	"Regulus" (Japanese ver.)	Kanghyun, CyA, Heungeul, Hwang Sung-jin	Kanghyun, CyA, Jeon Da-woon (RBW)	Jeon Da-woon (RBW), Kanghyun	3:42
2.	"Love Me" (내가 처음 만져본 강아지)	Yonghoon, CyA	Kim Do-hoon (RBW), Yonghoon, Kanghyun	Kim Do-hoon (RBW), Jeon Da-woon (RBW)	3:10
3.	"Feeling Good (2019 ver.)"	Yonghoon, Kanghyun, Harin, Dongmyeong, CyA	Yonghoon, Kanghyun, Harin, Dongmyeong, CyA	Jeon Da-woon (RBW), Kanghyun, Harin, CyA	2:42
4.	"Regulus (Inst.)" (야행성)		Kanghyun, CyA, Jeon Da-woon (RBW)	Jeon Da-woon (RBW), Kanghyun	3:42
Total length:					13:18

== Release history ==
Country	Date	Format	Version	Label	Ref
South Korea	August 29, 2019	Digital, download	Standard	RBW; Stone Music Entertainment	
Various	August 29, 2019	Digital, download	Standard	RBW; Stone Music Entertainment	
Japan	October 25, 2019	CD, digital, download	Japanese	RBW; GEMS Records; KISS Entertainment	
