= Onewe =

South Korean band

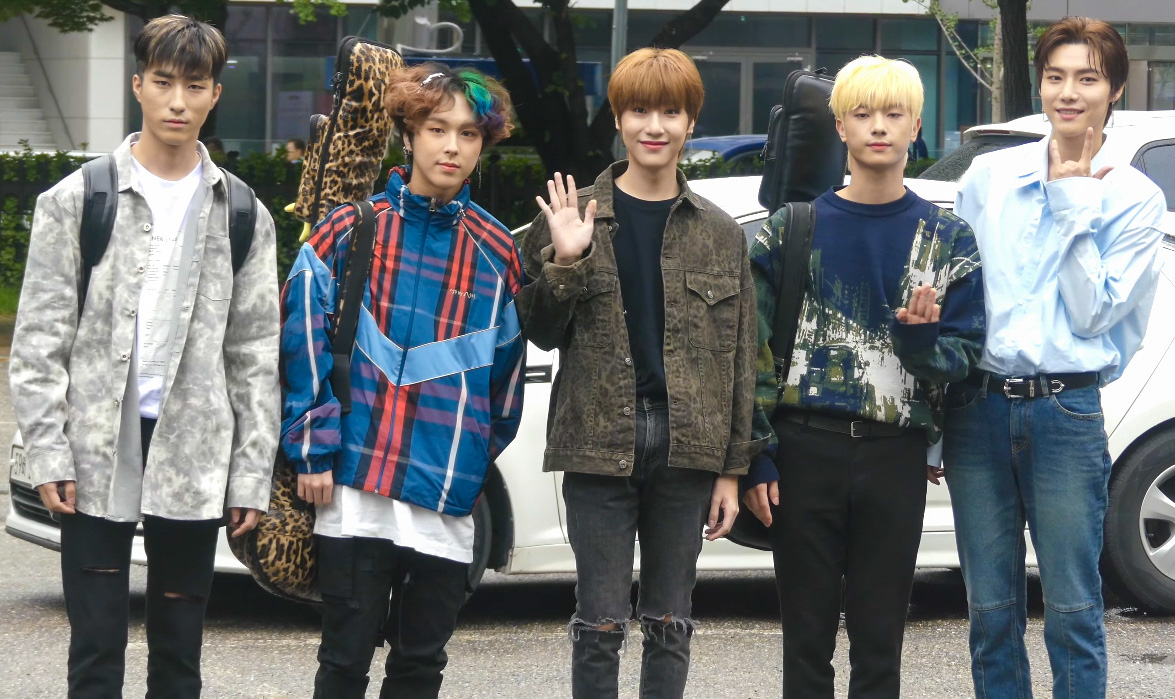
- Onewe in September 2019; L–R: Harin, Giuk, Dongmyeong, Kanghyun, and Yonghoon

Background information
- Also known as: M.A.S 0094; MAS
- Origin: Seoul, South Korea
- Genres: Alternative rock; ballad; Korean rock; K-pop; R&B; dance; jazz
- Years active: 2015–present
- Labels: RBW; Kiss Ent.; Modern Music
- Members: Yonghoon; Harin; Kanghyun; Dongmyeong; Giuk
- Website: Official (Korea); Official (Japan)

Onewe (Korean: 원위; RR: Wonwi; stylized in all caps; pronounced [wʌnˌwi]) is a South Korean alternative rock band composed of five members: Yonghoon, Harin, Kanghyun, Dongmyeong and Giuk (formerly known as CyA). The members originally formed under the name M.A.S 0094 (Make a Sound 0094). They released their first single "Butterfly, Find a Flower" on August 13, 2015 under Modern Music. In April 2017, they moved to RBW and were renamed MAS. In June 2018, it was announced that the band would redebut under the new name Onewe. The band officially made its re-debut on May 13, 2019, with their first single album 1/4.

== Career ==
=== 2015–2016: Formation and debut ===
Formed in May 2015, M.A.S 0094 was an independent group that performed and covered well-known songs in public with all profits going to charity for comfort women victims. The proceeds of their first single, "Butterfly, Find a Flower", released on August 13, 2015, also went towards charity.

M.A.S 0094 released their first EP, Feeling Good Day, on March 25, 2016. The EP contains six tracks, including the lead single "Feeling Good" and their single "Butterfly, Find a Flower" that was previously released.

They officially debuted on August 2 with their song "After 15 Seconds" which was performed on the music program The Show.

In November, the band held a performance called "Masland". They also released the single "Starlight".

On December 30, M.A.S 0094 performed as a session band for Mamamoo's performance during the 2016 KBS Song Festival. On December 31, they were the only Korean act to participate and were the finale performance in the Hello Starlight Forest New Year's Eve Concert held at Changsha, China.

=== 2017–2018: Make Some Noise, survival show and rebrand as Onewe ===
On January 6, 2017, the band released their second EP Make Some Noise. The EP contains six tracks, including the lead single "Make Some Noise" and "Starlight". In February, they held a concert in celebration of 200 days since their debut.

In April, the band signed a contract with RBW, moving from Modern Music to RBW and shortening their name to MAS. Also that month, Dongmyeong represented RBW in the reality television series Produce 101 Season 2. Dongmyeong later was eliminated in 68th place during episode 5.

MAS participated in the reality television series The Unit during October. In the 7th episode, Harin (52nd), Yonghoon (58th), Giuk (59th) and Kanghyun (61st) were eliminated. Dongmyeong made it to the finale where he was later eliminated (16th).

In December, MAS joined the RBW debut project RBW Trainee Real Life – We Will Debut along with pre-debut team RBW Boyz (now Oneus). They later held a concert for the project's second season entitled We Will Debut Chapter 2 – Special Party in the same month.

In June 2018, RBW revealed that MAS would re-debut under the name "Onewe". In September, they released a pre-debut single and music video for "Last Song" along with their labelmate Oneus. On December 23, they held a Christmas concert entitled Studio We: Live #1.

=== 2019: Re-debut and Japan debut ===
Onewe made their official re-debut on May 13, 2019 with the release of their first single album titled 1/4, with the lead single "Reminisce About All"

They made their indie debut in Japan on June 7, releasing a single album containing the Japanese versions of the songs included in 1/4. It made Tower Records Japan's "Top 10 Best-Selling Japanese Singles released by Korean Artists" for the first half of 2019. They later held their first Japanese concert, called Prologue, on June 8.

On June 30, they held a concert entitled Studio We: Live #2 "The Name of the Star I Live On".

On August 29, the band released its second single album 2/4, with their lead single "Regulus". On the same day, Onewe made their music show debut on M Countdown.

On October 13, they held a mini concert entitled Studio We: Live #3 "Fallin' Good Day". On December 29, they held a Christmas mini concert entitled Studio We: Live #4 "My Own Band Room".

=== 2020: One and major releases ===
On April 2, 2020, the band released their third single album 3/4, with the lead single "Q", composed by member Giuk and featured Hwasa. The single entered the Billboard's World Digital Song Sales at number 12.

Onewe's first full-length album, One, was released on May 26. The album includes tracks from previous releases along with three new songs, including the title track "End of Spring".

On September 12, Onewe held their first on-tact live concert entitled O! NEW E!volution. On September 24, the band pre-released their lead single "Parting", along with a music video. "Parting" was then included as the lead single of the band's first demo album Studio We: Recording which was released on October 15.

From November 13 to 15, they held a mini concert entitled Studio We : Live #5 "A Moment in Full Bloom Under Two Starlights".

On December 11, Onewe released their new single album Memory: Illusion, with their lead single "A Book in Memory". Following the release of the album, the band held their Studio We : Live #5 encore concert online on December 13.

=== 2021: Studio We: Live, Planet Nine: Alter Ego and Studio We: Recording #2 ===
On January 23 and 24, they held an online mini concert entitled Studio We: Live #6 "Onewe? or Onewe!". On March 6 and 7, they held an encore concert in Rolling Hall.

On June 16, Onewe released their first EP Planet Nine: Alter Ego, with their lead single "Rain To Be". All 5 members participated in writing or composing the songs on the album, with Kanghyun writing and composing the lead single. The B-side "Aurora" ranked at number one on MTV's 21 best K-Pop B-sides of 2021 list.

The group released a pre-release digital single "Star" on November 23, in advance of their second demo album, Studio We: Recording #2, on December 7.

On December 21, Onewe released a new collaboration single with Oneus titled "Stay".

=== 2022: Planet Nine: Voyager, Great Seoul Invasion, Timeless and Studio We: Recording #3 ===
On January 4, Onewe released their second EP Planet Nine: Voyager with the lead single "Universe_".

On May 20, Onewe released their special album Timeless, with the lead single "Roommate".

On July 12, Yonghoon enlisted in the military to serve his mandatory military service and Kanghyun enlisted on August 2.

Onewe participated in the reality television series Great Seoul Invasion which premiered on July 20 on Mnet. Onewe participated in the livestream auditions on April 15, and pre-recorded for the show before the enlistment of members Yonghoon and Kanghyun, with their last live-audience stage pre-recorded on July 5, a week prior to Yonghoon's scheduled enlistment. Through the show, Onewe produced and released the song "Hippie (Freedom from MM)" as part of the EP Great Seoul Invasion Section 1.

On October 4, the group released the single "Still Here", with a music video released the same day. The song was composed and prepared by Yonghoon and Kanghyun for the group, prior to their enlistment. On October 18, they released their third demo album Studio We: Recording #3 including "Still Here" as the lead single.

=== 2023: Gravity, Giuk solo debut and XOXO ===
On January 28, the band released their first full-length English album Gravity with the lead single of the same name. The song and album were composed and prepared by Yonghoon and Kanghyun for the group, prior to their enlistment.

On March 9, RBW announced that Giuk will no longer be going be the stage name CyA and will use his birth name, Giuk, for all official activities going forward.

Giuk made his official solo debut on April 20 with his first EP Psycho Xybernetics: Turn Over and the lead single "Time Machine (2020)", preceded by his first solo concert Prologue: Turn Over held on April 8 and 9.

On August 21, Onewe announced they would be releasing their second special album XOXO on August 29. The album contains two unit songs: "Salty Boy" by members Dongmyeong and Giuk, and "Omnipresent" by members Harin and Giuk.

On November 15, Giuk made his solo comeback with his second EP Rise Waves and the lead single "Scratch". In the lead up to the album release, he held a solo concert "Flight1112" held on November 12.

=== 2024: Military discharge, "Memories", Planet Nine: Isotropy, Off Road, Secret Santa ===
Yonghoon was discharged from the military on January 11, followed by Kanghyun on February 1.

Onewe is the featured artist for "Memories" from Moonbyul's studio album Starlit of Muse which was released on February 20, 2024.

On March 27, Onewe announced their return with their third EP Planet Nine: Isotropy, to be released on April 17, 2024. To commemorate the release of the new EP, the band held their O! New E!volution III concert on May 4 and 5 at Yes24 Live Hall in Seoul, South Korea. Following the release of the album, the band confirmed they had recently renewed their contract with RBW. According to RBW's corporate report, following the conclusion of their initial 7-year contract, Onewe renewed their exclusive contract with the agency for 5 years, spanning from April 1, 2024 until March 31, 2029.

On July 20, it was announced the band would be taking their first global steps with O! New E!volution III in Japan, including four concerts across two cities in Japan: two concerts at Supernova Kawasaki in Kawasaki on September 23, followed by another two concerts at Yogibo Meta Valley in Osaka on September 28.

On August 2, the band announced they would be holding their first outdoor solo concert 2024 Onewe Golden Festa : Onederland on August 24 and 25 at Olympic Park Waterfront Stage in Seoul, including special performances of new unreleased songs which have never been revealed before. On August 21, Onewe announced they would be releasing their digital single album Off Road on September 4, containing the three songs revealed through the concert.

On October 26, the band announced they would be holding their O! New E!volution IV concert at Yes24 Live Hall in Seoul on November 30 and December 1, including new arrangements and unreleased songs fit for the year-end. On December 16, Onewe announced their third special album Secret Santa, set to be released on December 23.

=== 2025: First world tour, We: Dream Chaser and Maze: Ad Astra ===
On February 5, it was announced that the band would be holding their first world tour 2025 Onewe World Tour O! New E!volution IV, beginning in Vietnam on March 21, followed by 20 cities across the United States and Canada from April 6 to May 9, and a Seoul encore on June 14 and 15.

On February 13, Onewe released a teaser announcing their second full-length album We: Dream Chaser, set to be released on March 5.

On March 1, Onewe made their debut appearance on the music competition program Immortal Songs: Singing the Legend for the March First Movement special, achieving two consecutive wins with their reinterpretation of the "Independence Army Song". Two weeks later, the band followed this up with three consecutive wins on their second appearance with their reinterpretation of Baby Vox's "Doll", reaching the final round before losing to EXID. By their third invite within their first month on the show, Onewe earned the title of Immortal Songs super rookie.

On April 21, it was announced that the 2025 Onewe World Tour 'O! New E!volution IV' would continue with two concerts in Taipei on July 26.

On July 4, it was announced that the band would be holding a concert enttled Flight: Onewe in Busan on August 9 and Seoul on August 30 and 31 organized by In Mate Project.

On September 19, Onewe released a teaser announcing their fourth mini album Maze: Ad Astra. The EP was released on October 7, with 7 songs, including the lead single "Maze". All songs on the EP saw the band members participating in the writing, composing, and arranging of the songs. They received their first-ever music show win with "Maze" on October 15, 2025 on Show Champion.

On November 15, Onewe earned their first overall Immortal Songs win, taking home the trophy with their reinterpretation of Sanulrim's "Mischievous Boy" scoring 420 points.

=== 2026: Studio We: Recording #4, 點 : The Quiver, 線: The Wake and 面: Unknown Atlas ===
On January 5, the band announced that they would release a new single "Ferris wheel" on January 14, ahead of their fourth demo album Studio We: Recording #4, which would be released on January 30.

On February 7 and 8, Onewe held their O! New E!volution V concert at KBS Arena in Seoul. The band are set to continue O! New E!volution V with concerts in Japan on April 18 and Taipei on April 26.

On March 24, it was announced that Onewe would be holding an upcoming concert at Rolling Hall in Hongdae, Seoul as part of the venue's 31st anniversary. On March 25, Onewe confirmed that they would be holding their Studio We: Live #7 "everyONE's WEsh" concert from May 1 to 3. Returning to Rolling Hall for the first time in five years, Onewe held Studio We: Live #7 as a special small theater performance to fulfill all the fans wishes.

On May 15, Onewe released a schedule plan announcing their second single album 點: The Quiver as the start of a new album series connecting points (點), lines (線) and planes (面). 點: The Quiver is set to be released on May 28, followed by a digital single 線: The Wake on July 27, culminating with the release of the band's third full-length album 面: Unknown Atlas on August 19. Following the release of the album, the band will hold their sixth live concert O! New E!volution Ⅵ at KBS Arena on September 19 and 20. On September 9, it was announced that O! New E!volution Ⅵ would continue with concerts in Japan on November 8 and Taipei on November 22.

On November 6, it was announced that the band would be holding their winter season live 冬花 : ONE moment WE bloom concert at Yes24 Live Hall on December 12 and 13. For the first time, the concert will feature a special stage where Onewe will perform with an orchestra.

== Members ==
=== Current (active) ===
- Yonghoon (용훈) – lead vocals, leader
- Harin (하린) – drums
- Kanghyun (강현) – guitars
- Dongmyeong (동명) – keyboards, vocals
- Giuk (기욱; formerly known as CyA (키아)) – bass guitar, rap

== Discography ==
=== Studio albums ===
Title	Album details	Peak chart positions	Sales
Title	Album details	KOR	Sales
One	Released: May 26, 2020; Label: RBW; Formats: CD, digital download, streaming	13	KOR: 14,223
Gravity	Released: January 28, 2023; Label: RBW; Formats: CD, digital download, streaming	21	KOR: 11,328
We: Dream Chaser	Released: March 5, 2025; Label: RBW; Formats: CD, digital download, streaming	9	KOR: 25,555
面: Unknown Atlas	Released: August 19, 2026; Label: RBW; Formats: CD, digital download, streaming	7	KOR: 46,404

=== Extended plays ===
Title	EP details	Peak chart positions	Sales
Title	EP details	KOR	Sales
Feeling Good Day (Note: Released as MAS.)	Released: March 25, 2016; Label: Modern K; Formats: CD, digital download, streaming; Track listing: 1. "Feeling Good"; 2. "After 15 Seconds" (15초 후); 3. "Butterfly Find a Flower" (나비 꽃을 찾다); 4. "I Wish" (좋겠어) (Bonus Track); 5. "Feeling Good" (Inst.); 6. "After 15 Seconds" (15초 후) (Inst.)	—	—N/a
Make Some Noise	Released: January 6, 2017; Label: Modern K; Formats: CD, digital download, streaming; Track listing: 1. "Make Some Noise"; 2. "Bubijuk Bibijuk" (부비적 비비적); 3. "Starlight" (별보다 빛나는); 4. "Make Some Noise" (Inst.); 5. "Bubijuk Bibijuk" (부비적 비비적) (Inst.); 6. "Starlight" (별보다 빛나는) (Inst.)	—	—N/a
Planet Nine: Alter Ego	Released: June 16, 2021; Label: RBW; Formats: CD, digital download, streaming	12	KOR: 19,897
Planet Nine: Voyager	Released: January 4, 2022; Label: RBW; Formats: CD, digital download, streaming	14	KOR: 22,128
Planet Nine: Isotropy	Released: April 17, 2024; Label: RBW; Formats: CD, digital download, streaming	12	KOR: 38,936
Maze: Ad Astra	Released: October 7, 2025; Label: RBW; Formats: CD, digital download, streaming	3	KOR: 38,170
"—" denotes releases that did not chart or were not released in that region.

=== Single albums ===
Title	Album details	Peak chart positions	Sales
Title	Album details	KOR	Sales
1/4	Released: May 13, 2019; Label: RBW; Formats: Digital download, streaming	—	—N/a
2/4	Released: August 29, 2019; Label: RBW; Formats: Digital download, streaming	—	—N/a
3/4	Released: April 2, 2020; Label: RBW; Formats: Digital download, streaming	—	—N/a
Memory: Illusion	Released: December 11, 2020; Label: RBW; Formats: CD, digital download, streaming	16	KOR: 14,749
Timeless	Released: May 20, 2022; Label: RBW; Formats: CD, digital download, streaming	14	KOR: 13,804
XOXO	Released: August 29, 2023; Label: RBW; Formats: CD, digital download, streaming	16	KOR: 9,479
Off Road	Released: September 4, 2024; Label: RBW; Formats: Digital download, streaming; Track listing: 1. "Off Road"; 2. "Solar Halo Ring" (바다에 적신 햇무리 반지); 3. "A Piece of You" (유일한 사랑이니까)	—	—N/a
Secret Santa	Released: December 23, 2024; Label: RBW; Formats: CD, digital download, streaming	9	KOR: 9,877
點: The Quiver	Released: May 28, 2026; Label: RBW; Formats: Mini CD, digital download, streaming	15	KOR: 17,459
"—" denotes releases that did not chart or were not released in that region.

=== Demo albums ===
Title	Album details	Peak chart positions	Sales
Title	Album details	KOR	Sales
Studio We: Recording	Released: October 15, 2020; Label: RBW; Formats: CD	15	KOR: 7,886
Studio We: Recording #2	Released: December 7, 2021; Label: RBW; Formats: CD	17	KOR: 11,442
Studio We: Recording #3	Released: October 18, 2022; Label: RBW; Formats: CD	30	KOR: 12,136
Studio We: Recording #4	Released: January 30, 2026; Label: RBW; Formats: CD	13	KOR: 13,615

=== Singles ===
==== As lead artist ====
Title	Year	Peak chart positions			Sales	Album
Title	Year	KOR DL	JPN	US World	Sales	Album
"Reminisce About All" (다 추억) (Note: Their first official releases as Onewe.) (Note: "Reminisce About All (Japanese ver.)" was released on June 7, 2019 in Japan as their first CD single.)	2019	—	38	—	JPN: 1,844 (Phy.)	One
"Regulus" (야행성) (Note: "Regulus (Japanese ver.)" was released on October 25, 2019 in Japan as their CD single.)	2019	—	—	—	JPN: 1,581 (Phy.)	One
"Q" (모르겠다고) (feat. Hwasa)	2020	—	—	12	—N/a	One
"End of Spring" (나위 계절 봄은 끝났다)	2020	—	—	—	—N/a	One
"Parting" (소행성)	2020	—	—	—	—N/a	Studio We: Recording
"A Book in Memory" (기억 속 한 권의 책)	2020	—	—	—	—N/a	Memory: Illusion
"Rain to Be" (비를 몰고 오는 소년)	2021	78	—	—	—N/a	Planet Nine: Alter Ego
"Star" (별)	2021	159	—	—	—N/a	Studio We: Recording #2
"Universe_" (너의 우주는)	2022	95	—	—	—N/a	Planet Nine: Voyager
"Roommate" (룸메이트)	2022	—	—	—	—N/a	Timeless
"Still Here" (기어이 또)	2022	—	—	—	—N/a	Studio We: Recording #3
"Gravity"	2023	—	—	—	—N/a	Gravity
"Salty Boy"	2023	—	—	—	—N/a	XOXO
"Omnipresent" (동서남북)	2023	—	—	—	—N/a	XOXO
"Beautiful Ashes" (추억의 소각장)	2024	63	—	—	—N/a	Planet Nine: Isotropy
"Off Road"	2024	147	—	—	—N/a	Off Road
"We X Mas"	2024	—	—	—	—N/a	Secret Santa
"The Starry Night" (별 헤는 밤)	2025	69	—	—	—N/a	We: Dream Chaser
"Maze" (미로)	2025	42	—	—	—N/a	Maze: Ad Astra
"Ferris Wheel" (관람차)	2026	109	—	—	—N/a	Studio We: Recording #4
"Icarus"	2026	61	—	—	—N/a	點: The Quiver
"Neverland" (우리들은 행방불명)	2026	91	—	—	—N/a	線 : The Wake
"Scenario"	2026	41	—	—	—N/a	面: Unknown Atlas
"—" denotes releases that did not chart or were not released in that region.

==== Collaborations ====
Title	Year	Peak chart positions	Album
Title	Year	KOR DL	Album
"Last Song" (with Oneus)	2018	—	Non-album singles
"Stay" (with Oneus)	2021	133	Non-album singles
"—" denotes releases that did not chart or were not released in that region.

==== As featured artist ====
Title	Year	Peak chart positions	Album
Title	Year	KOR DL	Album
"Memories" (Moonbyul feat. Onewe)	2024	60	Starlit of Muse

=== Soundtrack appearances ===
Title	Year	Album
"About Her" (그녀는 대체)	2020	Was It Love? OST
"Lighthouse"	2025	Where's My Hero? OST

=== Other songs ===
Year	Title	Format	Album	Notes	Ref.
2015	"Butterfly, Find a Flower"	Digital download, streaming	Feeling Good Day	Released as MAS 0094	
2016	"Feeling Good"	Digital download, streaming	Feeling Good Day	Released as MAS 0094	
2016	"Starlight"	Digital download, streaming	Make Some Noise	Released as MAS 0094	
2017	"Make Some Noise"	Digital download, streaming	Make Some Noise	Released as MAS 0094	
2022	"Hippie (Freedom from MM)"	Digital download, streaming	Great Seoul Invasion Section 1		

== Filmography ==
=== Television ===
Year	Network	Title	Role	Notes	Ref.
2017	KBS2	The Unit: Idol Rebooting Project	Contestant	Auditioned together as MAS, competing individually	
2018	Olleh TV	RBW Trainee Real Life – I Shall Debut	Cast alongside Oneus	Episodes 5-20	
2018	MBC Music / MBC Every1	Power Up! Beautiful snack bar is open	Cast alongside Oneus	8 Episodes	
2020	Mnet	Good Girl	Invited audience	Episode 8	
2021	tvN	Mama The Idol	Invited audience	Episode 1-2, 4-5	
2022	KBS2	You Hee-Yeol's Sketchbook	Guest	Episode 584	
2022	Mnet	Great Seoul Invasion	Contestant	Episode 1-8	
2024	KBS2	The Seasons: Zico's Artist	Guest	Episode 11	
2025	KBS2	Immortal Songs: Singing the Legend	Contestant	Episode 695, 697, 698-699, 726, 729, 730-731	
2026	KBS2	Immortal Songs: Singing the Legend	Contestant	758-759	

=== Web series ===
Year	Platform	Title	Role	Notes	Ref.
2023	YouTube	Onewe 4th Anniversary Trip		3 Episodes - Recorded in 2022	
2025-present	YouTube	Onewe's One-Way Street	Host		

=== Radio shows ===
Year	Radio	Title	Role	Notes	Ref.
2020-2021	KBS CoolFM	Day6's Kiss The Radio	Fixed guest	Every 3 weeks from December 10, 2020 - October 14, 2021	

== Accolades ==
=== Awards and nominations ===
Name of the award ceremony, year presented, category, nominee of the award, and the result of the nomination
Award ceremony	Year	Category	Nominee / Work	Result	Ref.
Hanteo Music Awards	2023	Special Award (Band)	Onewe	Nominated	
Korea Culture and Entertainment Awards	2024	K-Pop Singer Award	Onewe	Won	
Hanteo Music Awards	2024	Special Award (Band)	Onewe	Nominated	
Hanteo Music Awards	2025	Special Award (Band)	Onewe	Nominated	
Korea First Brand Awards	2026	Band Award	Onewe	Nominated	

=== Listicles ===
Other accolades for Onewe
Publisher	Year	Listicle	Work	Placement	Ref.
MTV	2021	MTV Best Kpop Bsides of 2021	AuRoRa	1	
