= Planet Nine: Voyager =

EP by Onewe
- Released: January 4, 2022
- Recorded: 2021
- Genre: Rock
- Length: 22:37
- Language: Korean
- Labels: RBW; Kakao Entertainment

Onewe chronology
Studio We: Recording #2 (2021)	Planet Nine: Voyager (2022)	Timeless (2022)

Singles from Planet Nine: Voyager
- 1. "Universe_" Released: January 4, 2022

Music videos
- "Universe_" on YouTube
- "Montage_" on YouTube

Planet Nine: Voyager is the second extended play by the South Korean band Onewe. The album was released by RBW on January 4, 2022, and distributed by Kakao Entertainment. The EP is the second in the band's Planet Nine series following their first EP Planet Nine : Alter Ego. It consists of six songs, written by each of the five members of the band, including the lead single "Universe_".

== Background and release ==
On November 15, 2021, a schedule plan was released announcing Onewe's new song “Star” as a pre-release single on November 23 for their second demo album Studio We: Recording #2 released on December 6, which would then be followed by the release of their second EP in January 2022.

On December 22, 2021, RBW confirmed that Onewe’s second EP, titled Planet Nine: Voyager, would be released on January 4, 2022.

On December 24, the full track list was revealed with a total of six songs, all primarily written and composed by one each of the five members of Onewe, with the band's leader Yonghoon responsible for both the sixth song and the lead single "Universe_".

The EP was released along with a music video for "Universe_" on January 4, 2022, at 6 pm KST.

On May 9, 2022, four months following the release of the EP, a music video for the song “Montage_” was released. The music video was hinted through footage used as a teaser the band’s upcoming O! NEW E!volution II Encore concert which had been posted a week prior on May 2.

In December 2022, "Universe_" was chosen as the soundtrack for a special collaboration music video for the promotion of the South Korean theatrical release of the 2020 French film Gagarine.

== Track listing ==
No.	Title	Lyrics	Music	Arrangement	Length
1.	"Universe_" (너의 우수는)	Yonghoon	Yonghoon, Jeon Da-woon (RBW)	Yonghoon, Jeon Da-woon (RBW)	3:36
2.	"Envision_" (우물 속 작은 아이)	Harin, CyA	Harin, Yonghoon, CyA, CocoDubuPapa (RBW)	CocoDubuPapa (RBW), Harin	3:43
3.	"Montage_" (꿈속에서 놓친 너, 옅은 잠결에 흐르길)	CyA, Yonghoon	CyA, Yonghoon, Jeon Da-woon (RBW), CocoDubuPapa (RBW)	CocoDubuPapa (RBW), CyA, Harin, Kanghyun	3:44
4.	"Trigger_" (시발점)	Dongmyeong, CyA	Dongmyeong, Kanghyun, Jeon Da-woon (RBW)	Jeon Da-woon (RBW), Dongmyeong, Kanghyun, CocoDubuPapa (RBW)	3:22
5.	"Orbit_" (궤도)	Kanghyun, CyA	Kanghyun, Jeon Da-woon (RBW), CocoDubuPapa (RBW), CyA	Jeon Da-woon (RBW), CocoDubuPapa (RBW), Kanghyun	3:43
6.	"From_" (선물할게요)	Yonghoon, Im Do-hwan	Yonghoon, Im Do-hwan	Jeon Da-woon, Onewe	4:26
Total length:					22:37

== Accolades ==
Year-end lists
Publisher	Year	Listicle	Work	Placement	Ref.
MTV	2022	MTV Best Kpop Bsides of 2022	Montage_	18	

== Charts ==
Chart (2022)	Peak position
South Korean Albums (Gaon)	14

== Release history ==
Country	Date	Format	Label	Ref
South Korea	January 4, 2022	CD, digital download, streaming	RBW; Kakao Entertainment	
Various	January 4, 2022	CD, digital download, streaming	RBW; Kakao Entertainment	
