= Giuk =

South Korean musician (born 2000)

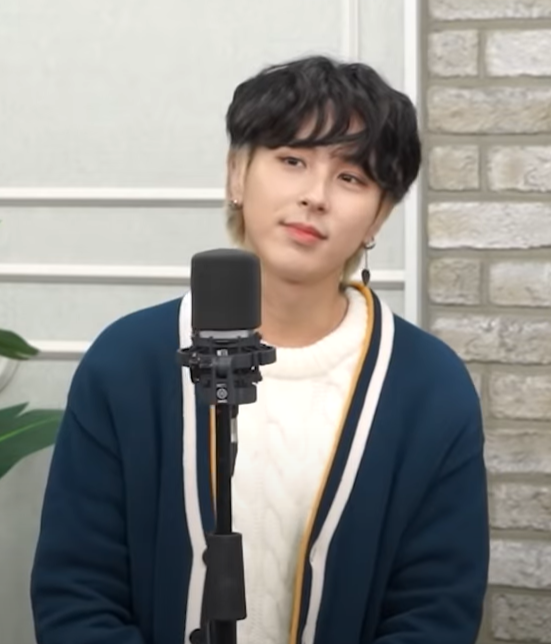
- Giuk in January 2022
- Born: January 24, 2000 (age 26); Suwon, Gyeonggi-do, South Korea
- Other name: CyA (키아) (2015–2023)
- Education: Hanlim Multi Art School (Dept of Applied Music, graduated Class of 2019)
- Occupations: Musician; rapper; songwriter; producer
- Musical career
- Genres: alternative rock; K-pop; Korean rock; Korean hip hop
- Instruments: Vocals, Bass
- Years active: 2015–present
- Labels: RBW; KISS Ent.; Modern Music
- Member of: Onewe; Named Late

Korean name
- Hangul: 이기욱
- Hanja: 李寄旭
- RR: I Giuk
- MR: I Kiuk

Lee Giuk (Korean: 이기욱, born January 24, 2000), known mononymously as Giuk and formerly known by the stage name CyA (키아), is a South Korean musician, rapper, songwriter, and producer. He is the bassist and rapper of the South Korean alternative rock band Onewe (formerly known as M.A.S 0094 or MAS). He made his solo debut on April 20, 2023, releasing his first extended play (EP) Psycho Xybernetics : Turn Over with the lead single "Time Machine (2100)". His second solo EP Rise Waves was released seven months later on November 15, 2023, with the lead single "Scratch".

== Career ==
=== 2015-2016: M.A.S 0094 formation and debut ===
In 2015, Giuk formed the band M.A.S 0094 with his four bandmates and they originally performed cover songs. He got his first writing credit through KOMCA on the band's first original single, "Butterfly, Finding Flower", released on August 13. He would continue to participate in the band's songwriting, and also started composing songs, with the singles "Feeling Good" and "Starlight." He made his official debut with M.A.S 0094 on The Show on August 2, 2016 with the band's performance of their song "After 15 Seconds".

On December 12, Giuk featured in the soundtrack "Promise" by Donghyun of Boyfriend for The Miracle OST Part.2.

=== 2017-2018: MAS, The Unit and rebrand as Onewe ===
On June 1, 2017, he signed with RBW Entertainment as part of M.A.S 0094, and the band's name was shortened to MAS. In October, Giuk participated in the survival show The Unit, auditioning with the other members of MAS, but they competed individually. He was eliminated in the 7th episode, placing 59th.

As a member of MAS, Giuk used the stage name CyA, and he continued to use this name when MAS re-branded and re-debuted under the name "Onewe" in June 2018.

=== 2019-present: Re-debut with Onewe and other producing activities ===
Giuk produced and featured in "Crazy & Crazy (Prod. CyA)" for labelmate Oneus' debut EP Light Us which was released on January 9, 2019.

Giuk officially made his re-debut with Onewe on May 13, with the release of their digital single album titled 1/4. Giuk took lead on writing and composing the song "Ring on my Ears" for the album, for which a music video was released on May 15. He then made his debut in Japan as a member of Onewe with their first Japanese single album Reminisce About All on June 7.

While continuing to participate in Onewe, Giuk also continued to write music for other groups. In 2020, he co-wrote, composed and arranged "Dizzy" for Oneus' fourth EP Lived which was released on August 19. In 2021, Giuk he co-wrote the lead single "Zombie" for Purple Kiss' second EP Hide & Seek and featured in the music video. He also acted in a main role alongside Purple Kiss member Goeun in the group's story films for the promotion of their following EP.

=== 2023: Solo debut with Psycho Xybernetics : Turn Over, Rise Waves ===
On March 9, 2023, RBW Entertainment announced that Giuk will no longer use the stage name CyA, and now uses his legal name, Giuk, for all official activities, including as a member of Onewe and his solo activities as an artist and producer.

On April 8 and 9, Giuk held his first solo concert Prologue: Turn Over in anticipation of his solo debut. Giuk officially made his solo debut on April 20, releasing his first EP Psycho Xybernetics: Turn Over with the lead single "Time Machine (2100)". On June 6, he held an encore concert Epilogue: Turn Over.

He wrote the lyrics and composed for the single "Save Me" for Mamamoo+ which was released on July 18 and included in the duo's first EP Two Rabbits released in August. He also co-wrote another song for labelmates Purple Kiss, titled "Mistake", and released in September as part of the group's first single album Festa. Giuk is the featured artist for the title track "A Girl's Panorama" from YongYong's first full-length album MyMy which was released on November 9.

On November 11, he held a solo concert entitled "Flight1112". Giuk released his second solo EP Rise Waves on November 15, with the lead single "Scratch".

=== 2024-present: Onewe's return and solo features ===
Following the military discharge of members Yonghoon and Kanghyun, Onewe returned with their third EP Planet Nine: Isotropy on April 17, 2024, resuming promotions through music broadcasts and various festivals and concerts. In addition to his promotions with Onewe throughout the year, Giuk featured in the singles "Back To You" by Aden, released on July 30, and "You Don't Love Me" by Divine, released on October 2, 2024. He is also featured on Divine's "You & Me" released on February 12, 2026.

== Discography ==
=== Extended plays ===
Title	EP details	Peak chart positions	Physical sales
Title	EP details	KOR	Physical sales
Psycho Xybernetics: Turn Over	Released: January 28, 2023; Label: RBW; Formats: CD, digital download, streaming	56	KOR: 7895
Rise Waves	Released: November 15, 2023; Label: RBW; Formats: CD, digital download, streaming	33	KOR: 6643

=== Singles ===
==== As lead artist ====
Title	Year	Peak chart positions	Album
Title	Year	KOR DL	Album
"Time Machine (2100)" (제0호선 시간역행)	2023	—	Psycho Xybernetics : Turn Over
"Scratch" (내 영혼에 낸 Scratch)	2023	179	Rise Waves
"—" denotes releases that did not chart or were not released in that region.

==== As featured artist ====
Title	Year	Album
"A Girl's Panorama" (YongYong feat. Giuk)	2023	MyMy
"Back To You" (오늘 또 내일) (Aden feat. Giuk)	2024	Non-album singles
"You Don't Love Me" (틀린 말없이) (Divine feat. Giuk)	2024	Non-album singles
"You & Me" (너 하고 나) (Divine feat. Giuk)	2026	Non-album singles

=== Soundtrack appearances ===
==== As featured artist ====
Title	Year	Album
"Promise" (Donghyun feat. CyA of M.A.S 0094)	2016	The Miracle OST Part.2

== Filmography ==
=== Television shows ===
Year	Title	Role	Notes	Ref.
2017	The Unit: Idol Rebooting Project	Contestant	Episode 1-7	
2020	Good Girl	Invited audience	Episode 8	
2021	Mama The Idol	Invited audience	Episode 1-2, 4-5	
2022	Great Seoul Invasion	Contestant	Episode 1-8	

=== Radio shows ===
Year	Title	Radio	Notes	Ref.
2020-2021	Day6's Kiss The Radio	KBS Radio	Fixed guest, with Onewe Every 3 weeks from December 10, 2020 - October 14, 2021	

== Participating albums and Sound sources ==
Year	Song	Artist	Album	Label	Credited	Ref
2022	"Rockstar"	RARE	Rareness	—N/a	Bass	
2022	"Congratulations"	Moonbyul	<Second World> Episode 3	Studio JAMM, Showplay	Bass	
2024	"Like a Fool"	Moonbyul	Starlit of Muse	RBW	Bass	

== Music production credits ==
Giuk is the main writer and composer for his solo releases and co-writes/produces the vast majority of Onewe's output alongside the other members, as well a writing and producing for other artists. As of August, 2026, the Korea Music Copyright Association (KOMCA) has 138 songs listed under his name. All credits adapted from KOMCA, unless stated otherwise.

Key
†	Indicates single release

Year	Song	Artist	Album	Label	Lyrics		Music	
Year	Song	Artist	Album	Label	Credited	With	Credited	With
2015	"Butterfly, Find a Flower" (나비, 꽃을 찾다)	M.A.S 0094	Feeling Good Day	Modern Music	Yes	Jeon Dawoon, Yoon Hyeoju, Jang Yoonseo	No	—N/a
2016	"Feeling Good"	M.A.S 0094	Feeling Good Day	Modern Music	Yes	M.A.S 0094	Yes	M.A.S 0094, Jeon Dawoon
2016	"Starlight" (별보다 빛나는)	M.A.S 0094	Make Some Noise	Modern Music	No	—N/a	Yes	Im Dohwan, M.A.S 0094
2017	"Make Some Noise"	M.A.S 0094	Make Some Noise	Modern Music	Yes	M.A.S 0094, Lee Dong-gon	Yes	Jeon Dawoon, M.A.S 0094, Lee Dong-gon
2017	"Boobijuk Bibijuk" (부비적 비비적)	M.A.S 0094	Make Some Noise	Modern Music	Yes	M.A.S 0094	No	—N/a
2019	"Crazy & Crazy" (ㅁㅊㄷㅁㅊㅇ) (Prod. Giuk)	Oneus	Light Us	RBW Entertainment	Yes	Ravn, Leedo	Yes	Jeon Dawoon
2019	"Ring on my Ears" (귀걸이가 나를 때리게)	Onewe	1/4	RBW Entertainment	Yes	—N/a	Yes	Jeon Dawoon, Kanghyun
2019	"0&4" (공과 사)	Onewe	1/4	RBW Entertainment	Yes	Kanghyun, Yonghoon	Yes	Kanghyun, Yonghoon, Jeon Dawoon
2019	"Ring on my Ears (Remix)" (귀걸이가 나를 때리게)	Onewe	1/4	RBW Entertainment	Yes	—N/a	Yes	Jeon Dawoon
2019	"Kousikondou" (公私混同)	Onewe	Reminisce About All	RBW Entertainment	Yes	Kanghyun, Yonghoon, Hwang Sungjin	Yes	Kanghyun, Yonghoon, Jeon Dawoon
2019	"Piasugabokuwobutuyouni" (ピアスが僕をぶつように)	Onewe	Reminisce About All	RBW Entertainment	Yes	Hwang Sungjin	Yes	Jeon Dawoon, Kanghyun
2019	"Love Me" (내가 처음 만져본 강아지)	Onewe	2/4	RBW Entertainment	Yes	Yonghoon	No	—N/a
2019	"Regulus" (야행성)	Onewe	2/4	RBW Entertainment	Yes	Kanghyun, HEUNGEUL	Yes	Kanghyun, Jeon Dawoon
2019	"Feeling Good (2019 ver.)"	Onewe	2/4	RBW Entertainment	Yes	Yonghoon, Kanghyun, Harin, Dongmyeong	Yes	Jeon Dawoon, Yonghoon, Kanghyun, Harin, Dongmyeong
2020	"Q" (모르겠다고) (feat. Hwasa)	Onewe	3/4	RBW Entertainment	Yes	Kim Jaehyun	Yes	Jeon Dawoon, Yonghoon, Kim Jaehyun, Noden
2020	"Crazy Good" (미쳤다 미쳤어)	Onewe	One	RBW Entertainment	Yes	Yonghoon	Yes	Jeon Dawoon, Yonghoon
2020	"End Of Spring" (나의 계절 봄은 끝났다)	Onewe	One	RBW Entertainment	Yes	Kim Dohoon, Seo Yongbae	Yes	Kim Dohoon, Seo Yongbae, Jeon Dawoon
2020	"If"	Onewe	One	RBW Entertainment	Yes	Yonghoon	Yes	Yonghoon, Jeon Dawoon
2020	"End of Spring (Rock Ver.)" (나의 계절 봄은 끝났다)	Onewe	One	RBW Entertainment	Yes	Kim Dohoon, Seo Yongbae	Yes	Kim Dohoon, Seo Yongbae, Jeon Dawoon, Kanghyun
2020	"About Her" (그녀는 대체)	Onewe	Was It Love? OST Part.6	JTBC Studios	Yes	Ha Geunyoung, Lee Suyeon, Lee Jinsil, Yonghoon	No	—N/a
2020	"Dizzy" (혼란하다 혼란해)	Oneus	Lived	RBW Entertainment	Yes	Seoho, Ravn	Yes	Seoho, Ravn, CocoDoobooPapa
2020	"Parting" (소행성)	Onewe	Studio We : Recording	RBW Entertainment	Yes	Kanghyun	Yes	Kanghyun, Jeon Dawoon, Harin
2020	"Regulus (Melody Guide 2)" (야행성)	Onewe	Studio We : Recording	RBW Entertainment	Yes	Kanghyun, HEUNGEUL	Yes	Kanghyun
2020	"Parting (Prologue Mix)" (소행성)	Onewe	Studio We : Recording	RBW Entertainment	Yes	Kanghyun	Yes	Kanghyun
2020	"Love Me" (내가 처음 만져본 강아지)	Onewe	Studio We : Recording	RBW Entertainment	Yes	Yonghoon	No	—N/a
2020	"0&4 (Dialogue Rough)" (공과 사)	Onewe	Studio We : Recording	RBW Entertainment	Yes	Kanghyun, Yonghoon	No	—N/a
2020	"Crazy Good (Rock Vibes)" (미쳤다 미쳤어)	Onewe	Studio We : Recording	RBW Entertainment	Yes	Yonghoon	Yes	Yonghoon
2020	"If (181125_2)"	Onewe	Studio We : Recording	RBW Entertainment	Yes	Yonghoon	Yes	Yonghoon, Jeon Dawoon
2020	"Trauma (Aquarium)"	Onewe	Memory : Illusion	RBW Entertainment	Yes	Yonghoon	Yes	Yonghoon, CocoDoobooPapa, Kanghyun, Harin
2020	"A Book in Memory" (기억 속 한 권의 책)	Onewe	Memory : Illusion	RBW Entertainment	Yes	Yonghoon	No	Yonghoon, Jeon Dawoon
2020	"Eraser" (기억 세탁소)	Onewe	Memory : Illusion	RBW Entertainment	Yes	Jeon Dawoon, Yonghoon	Yes	Jeon Dawoon
2021	"Intro: Spaceship" (Intro : 우주선)	Onewe	Planet Nine : Alter Ego	RBW Entertainment	Yes	—N/a	Yes	Kanghyun, Harin
2021	"Rain To Be" (비를 몰고 오는 소년)	Onewe	Planet Nine : Alter Ego	RBW Entertainment	Yes	Kanghyun	Yes	Kanghyun, Jeon Dawoon
2021	"Aurora"	Onewe	Planet Nine : Alter Ego	RBW Entertainment	Yes	Kanghyun, Yonghoon	No	—N/a
2021	"Logo"	Onewe	Planet Nine : Alter Ego	RBW Entertainment	Yes	Yonghoon, Harin, Dongmyeong	Yes	Yonghoon, Kanghyun, CocoDoobooPapa
2021	"A.I." (로보트도 인간에게 감정을 느낀다)	Onewe	Planet Nine : Alter Ego	RBW Entertainment	Yes	Yonghoon, Dongmyeong	Yes	Yonghoon, Jeon Dawoon, Kanghyun
2021	"Veronica" (베로니카의 섬)	Onewe	Planet Nine : Alter Ego	RBW Entertainment	Yes	Yonghoon	Yes	Yonghoon, Kanghyun, Jeon Dawoon
2021	"Cosmos" (천체)	Onewe	Planet Nine : Alter Ego	RBW Entertainment	Yes	Kanghyun	No	—N/a
2021	"Zombie"	Purple Kiss	Hide & Seek	RBW Entertainment	Yes	Kim Dohoon, Kang Jiwon, Basick, Yuki	No	—N/a
2021	"Star" (별)	Onewe	Studio We : Recording #2	RBW Entertainment	Yes	Jeon Dawoon, CocoDoobooPapa, Yonghoon	Yes	Jeon Dawoon, CocoDoobooPapa, Yonghoon
2021	"Aurora (191128_2)"	Onewe	Studio We : Recording #2	RBW Entertainment	Yes	Kanghyun, Yonghoon, Jeon Dawoon	No	—N/a
2021	"Logo (First Live Ver.)"	Onewe	Studio We : Recording #2	RBW Entertainment	Yes	Yonghoon	Yes	Yonghoon, Kanghyun
2021	"A.I. (Guitar Rough)" (로보트도 인간에게 감정을 느낀다)	Onewe	Studio We : Recording #2	RBW Entertainment	Yes	Yonghoon	Yes	Yonghoon
2021	"Veronica (Draft Guide)" (베로니카의 섬)	Onewe	Studio We : Recording #2	RBW Entertainment	Yes	Yonghoon	Yes	Yonghoon, Kanghyun
2021	"Rain To Be (Original Topline Ver.)" (비를 몰고 오는 소년)	Onewe	Studio We : Recording #2	RBW Entertainment	Yes	Kanghyun	No	—N/a
2021	"Cosmos (Cosmos Guitar Vibe)" (천체)	Onewe	Studio We : Recording #2	RBW Entertainment	Yes	Kanghyun	No	—N/a
2021	"Aquarium (Trauma Ver.)"	Onewe	Studio We : Recording #2	RBW Entertainment	Yes	—N/a	Yes	—N/a
2021	"In Course"	Onewe	Studio We : Recording #2	RBW Entertainment	No	—N/a	Yes	Kanghyun, Harin
2022	"Envision_" (우물 속 작은 아이)	Onewe	Planet Nine : Voyager	RBW Entertainment	Yes	Harin	Yes	Harin, Yonghoon, CocoDoobooPapa
2022	"Montage_" (꿈속에서 놓친 너, 옅은 잠결에 흐르길)	Onewe	Planet Nine : Voyager	RBW Entertainment	Yes	Yonghoon	Yes	Yonghoon, Jeon Dawoon, CocoDoobooPapa
2022	"Trigger_" (시발점)	Onewe	Planet Nine : Voyager	RBW Entertainment	Yes	Dongmyeong	No	—N/a
2022	"Orbit_" (궤도)	Onewe	Planet Nine : Voyager	RBW Entertainment	Yes	Kanghyun	Yes	Kanghyun, Jeon Dawoon, CocoDoobooPapa
2022	"From_" (선물할게요)	Onewe	Planet Nine : Voyager	RBW Entertainment	No	—N/a	Yes	
2022	"Roommate"	Onewe	Timeless	RBW Entertainment	Yes	Yonghoon, Im Dohwan	No	—N/a
2022	"Starlight (Live Ver.)"	Onewe	Timeless	RBW Entertainment	No	—N/a	Yes	Jeon Dawoon, Onewe
2022	"Hippie (Freedom from MM)" (히피)	Onewe	Great Seoul Invasion Section 1	MPMG Music	Yes	Yonghoon	Yes	Onewe, Jeon Dawoon
2022	"Envision_ (Ani Vibe Ver.)" (우물 속 작은 아이)	Onewe	Studio We : Recording #3	RBW Entertainment	Yes	Harin	Yes	Harin
2022	"Montage_ (210810)" (꿈속에서 놓친 너, 옅은 잠결에 흐르길)	Onewe	Studio We : Recording #3	RBW Entertainment	Yes	Yonghoon	Yes	Yonghoon
2022	"Trigger_ (201007) (시발점)	Onewe	Studio We : Recording #3	RBW Entertainment	Yes	Dongmyeong	No	—N/a
2022	"Orbit_ (Piano Ver)" (궤도)	Onewe	Studio We : Recording #3	RBW Entertainment	Yes	Kanghyun	No	—N/a
2023	"Gravity"	Onewe	Gravity	RBW Entertainment	Yes	Yonghoon, Lee JooHee(MUMW), se.on(MUMW), Young(MUMW)	Yes	Yonghoon, Jeon Dawoon
2023	"AuRoRa" (English Ver.)	Onewe	Gravity	RBW Entertainment	Yes	Kanghyun, Yonghoon, Lee Joo Hee(MUMW), Bisom(MUMW)	No	—N/a
2023	"Parting" (English Ver.)	Onewe	Gravity	RBW Entertainment	Yes	Kanghyun, Lee Joo Hee(MUMW), ReMi(MUMW)	Yes	Kanghyun, Jeon Dawoon, Harin
2023	"Regulus" (English Ver.)	Onewe	Gravity	RBW Entertainment	Yes	Kanghyun, HEUNGEUL, Lee Joo Hee(MUMW), Im Hye Rin(MUMW)	Yes	Kanghyun, Jeon Dawoon
2023	"Montage_" (English Ver.)	Onewe	Gravity	RBW Entertainment	Yes	Yonghoon, Lee Joo Hee(MUMW), Kim Eung Ju(MUMW)	Yes	Yonghoon, Jeon Dawoon, CocoDoobooPapa
2023	"Rain To Be" (English Ver.)	Onewe	Gravity	RBW Entertainment	Yes	Kanghyun, Lee Joo Hee(MUMW), Seo Ha Mi(MUMW)	Yes	Kanghyun, Jeon Dawoon
2023	"Ring on my Ears" (English Ver.)	Onewe	Gravity	RBW Entertainment	Yes	Lee Joo Hee(MUMW), ReMi(MUMW)	Yes	Jeon Dawoon, Kanghyun
2023	"Trauma" (English Ver.)	Onewe	Gravity	RBW Entertainment	Yes	Yonghoon, Lee Joo Hee(MUMW), LEESIDAE(MUMW)	Yes	Yonghoon, CocoDoobooPapa, Kanghyun, Harin
2023	"Logo" (English Ver.)	Onewe	Gravity	RBW Entertainment	Yes	Yonghoon, Harin, Dongmyeong, Lee Joo Hee(MUMW), Bisom(MUMW)	Yes	Yonghoon, Kanghyun, CocoDoobooPapa
2023	End Of Spring (English Ver.)	Onewe	Gravity	RBW Entertainment	Yes	Kim Dohoon, Seo Yongbae, ESSIE	Yes	Kim Dohoon, Seo Yongbae, Jeon Dawoon
2023	"Crazy Good" (English Ver.)	Onewe	Gravity	RBW Entertainment	Yes	Yonghoon, Lee Joo Hee(MUMW), roze(MUMW)	Yes	Jeon Dawoon, Yonghoon
2023	"Zombie (Japanese ver.)"	Purple Kiss	Dear Violet	RBW Entertainment	Yes	Kim Dohoon, Kang Jiwon, Basick, Yuki, Davve	No	—N/a
2023	"Intro : X" (새 지구)	Giuk	Psycho Xybernetics : Turn Over	RBW Entertainment	Yes	—N/a	Yes	—N/a
2023	"Time Machine (2100)" (제0호선 시간역행)	Giuk	Psycho Xybernetics : Turn Over	RBW Entertainment	Yes	—N/a	Yes	Jeon Dawoon
2023	"Unblown (2020)" (꽃에 물 안 주고 피길 원하네) (feat. Aden)	Giuk	Psycho Xybernetics : Turn Over	RBW Entertainment	Yes	Aden	Yes	Jeon Dawoon, Aden, Gray Dot
2023	"Ego (2021)" (자기중심적) (feat. NiiHWA)	Giuk	Psycho Xybernetics : Turn Over	RBW Entertainment	Yes	NiiHWA, Kauhaxi	Yes	Jin Minho, NiiHWA, Kauhaxi
2023	"Love Virus❤ (2050)" (feat. Sunwoo)	Giuk	Psycho Xybernetics : Turn Over	RBW Entertainment	Yes	Sunwoo	Yes	Sunwoo, LIVING PUFF
2023	"Rarity (2062)" (멸종 위기종)	Giuk	Psycho Xybernetics : Turn Over	RBW Entertainment	Yes	—N/a	Yes	Jeon Dawoon, Gray Dot
2023	"Xybernetic (2077)" (feat. Kami)	Giuk	Psycho Xybernetics : Turn Over	RBW Entertainment	Yes	KAMI	Yes	KAMI
2023	"Apocalypse (2090)"	Giuk	Psycho Xybernetics : Turn Over	RBW Entertainment	Yes	—N/a	Yes	YHK, Gray Dot
2023	"Save Me" (지구에 혼자 남게 된다면 (..*---*..))	Mamamoo+	Two Rabbits	RBW Entertainment	Yes	Moonbyul	Yes	Jeon Dawoon, Moobyul
2023	"Salty Boy"	Onewe	XOXO	RBW Entertainment	Yes	Dongmyeong	Yes	Dongmyeong, Jeon Dawoon
2023	"Omnipresent" (동서님복)	Onewe	XOXO	RBW Entertainment	Yes	—N/a	Yes	Harin, CocoDoobooPapa
2023	"Mistake"	Purple Kiss	Festa	RBW Entertainment	Yes	AllThou, KINSHA, FLORA	No	—N/a
2023	"A Girl's Panorama" (소녀의 파노라마) (feat. Giuk)	YongYong	MyMy	Saurus	Yes	YongYong	Yes	YongYong, Heondred
2023	"Intro : Foreverest" (Intro : 영원의 숲)	Giuk	Rise Waves	RBW Entertainment	Yes	—N/a	Yes	Gray Dot
2023	"Scratch" (내 영혼에 낸 Scratch)	Giuk	Rise Waves	RBW Entertainment	Yes	—N/a	Yes	Jeon Dawoon
2023	"Block123" (보도블록123) (feat. Moonbyul of Mamamoo)	Giuk	Rise Waves	RBW Entertainment	Yes	CocoDoobooPapa	Yes	CocoDoobooPapa
2023	"Overtake" (추월)	Giuk	Rise Waves	RBW Entertainment	Yes	—N/a	Yes	Jeon Dawoon, mediumrarecookies, 8:59
2023	"Happy or Not?" (feat. Rare, Gray Dot)	Giuk	Rise Waves	RBW Entertainment	Yes	Gray Dot, Rare	Yes	Gray Dot, Rare
2023	"Penrose Stairs" (feat. YongYong, Leedo of Oneus)	Giuk	Rise Waves	RBW Entertainment	Yes	YongYong, Leedo	Yes	YongYong, Leedo
2023	"My Blue"	Giuk	Rise Waves	RBW Entertainment	Yes	—N/a	Yes	Gray Dot
2023	"Outro : Dresden" (Outro : 한 소녀의 촛불)	Giuk	Rise Waves	RBW Entertainment	Yes	Kauhaxi	Yes	Kauhaxi
2023	"We Wish You A Merry Christmas"	Onewe	Non-album single	RBW Entertainment	Yes	Dongmyeong	Yes	Dongmyeong
2024	"Beautiful Ashes" (추억의 소각장)	Onewe	Planet Nine: Isotropy	RBW Entertainment	Yes	Yonghoon	Yes	Jeon Dawoon, Yonghoon, Kanghyun, Harin
2024	"Shoot It Out"	Onewe	Planet Nine: Isotropy	RBW Entertainment	Yes	Kanghyun	No	—N/a
2024	"Meteor Shower" (한여름 밤 유성우)	Onewe	Planet Nine: Isotropy	RBW Entertainment	Yes	—N/a	Yes	Gray Dot
2024	"Count The Stars" (별 세는 너)	Onewe	Planet Nine: Isotropy	RBW Entertainment	Yes	Yonghoon	No	—N/a
2024	"Kiss in the Rain"	Onewe	Planet Nine: Isotropy	RBW Entertainment	Yes	Dongmyeong	Yes	Jeon Dawoon, Dongmyeong, CocoDoobooPapa
2024	"Pleasant" (다시 만나서 반가워)	Onewe	Planet Nine: Isotropy	RBW Entertainment	Yes	Harin, Yonghoon	No	—N/a
2024	"Back To You" (오늘 또 내일) (feat. Giuk)	Aden	Non-album single	MARO Records	Yes	Aden	Yes	Aden, RUIMUI
2024	"Off Road"	Onewe	Off Road	RBW Entertainment	Yes	Dr.Jo	No	—N/a
2024	"Solar Halo Ring"	Onewe	Off Road	RBW Entertainment	Yes	Bydor Archive	Yes	Kanghyun, Gray Dot, Bydor Archive
2024	"A Piece of You"	Onewe	Off Road	RBW Entertainment	Yes	Yonghoon	No	—N/a
2024	"You Don't Love Me" (틀린 말없이) (feat. Giuk)	Divine	Non-album single	—N/a	Yes	Divine	Yes	Divine, Checkmate
2024	"We X Mas" (크리스마스는 이래야지)	Onewe	Secret Santa	RBW Entertainment	Yes	Dongmyeong, Harin	Yes	Dongmyeong, Harin, Jeon Dawoon
2024	"Actor"	Onewe	Secret Santa	RBW Entertainment	Yes	Jeon Dawoon, Yonghoon	Yes	Jeon Dawoon, Yonghoon, Kanghyun, Harin
2025	"Alice"	Onewe	We: Dream Chaser	RBW Entertainment	Yes	Kanghyun	No	—N/a
2025	"The Starry Night" (별 헤는 밤)	Onewe	We: Dream Chaser	RBW Entertainment	Yes	Kanghyun	No	—N/a
2025	"Evildoer" (악당은 영웅의 변신을 기다려준다)	Onewe	We: Dream Chaser	RBW Entertainment	Yes	Bydor Archive, Jxhyung	Yes	Jxhyung, Bydor Archive
2025	"Traffic Love" (일방통행; 一方通行)	Onewe	We: Dream Chaser	RBW Entertainment	Yes	Bydor Archive	Yes	Bydor Archive, wez
2025	"Rise Again" (오래된 음악가의 추억)	Onewe	We: Dream Chaser	RBW Entertainment	Yes	Harin	No	—N/a
2025	"Dreamcatcher" (청천을; 靑天乙)	Onewe	We: Dream Chaser	RBW Entertainment	Yes	Bydor Archive	Yes	Gray Dot, Bydor Archive
2025	"All the things I love" (눈이 부시게)	Onewe	We: Dream Chaser	RBW Entertainment	Yes	Dongmyeong	No	—N/a
2025	"Sole Star" (검은 별)	Onewe	We: Dream Chaser	RBW Entertainment	Yes	Bydor Archive	Yes	Bydor Archive, wez, Gu Ye-eun
2025	"Lighthouse"	Onewe	"Where's my hero? Special OST Part.3"	RBW Entertainment	No	—N/a	Yes	Page !, Jeon Dawoon, Harin, Kanghyun
2025	"Zombie (English ver.)"	Purple Kiss	Our Now	RBW Entertainment	Yes	Kim Dohoon, Kang Jiwon, Basick, Yuki, eSNa	No	—N/a
2025	"Maze" (미로)	Onewe	Maze: Ad Astra	RBW Entertainment	Yes	Bydor Archive	Yes	Bydor Archive, wez
2025	"Hide & Seek" (숨바꼭질)	Onewe	Maze: Ad Astra	RBW Entertainment	Yes	Bydor Archive	Yes	Jxhyung, Bydor Archive
2025	"Trace" (흔적)	Onewe	Maze: Ad Astra	RBW Entertainment	Yes	Harin	No	—N/a
2025	"Beyond the Storm" (비바람을 건너)	Onewe	Maze: Ad Astra	RBW Entertainment	Yes	Dongmyeong, X3RO	No	—N/a
2026	"Ferris wheel" (관람차)	Onewe	Studio We: Recording #4	RBW Entertainment	Yes	Bydor Archive	Yes	Hashin, Bydor Archive
2026	"Meteor Shower" (한여름 밤 유성우) (7.29)	Onewe	Studio We: Recording #4	RBW Entertainment	Yes	—N/a	Yes	—N/a
2026	"Dreamcatcher" (청천을) (2021)	Onewe	Studio We: Recording #4	RBW Entertainment	Yes	—N/a	Yes	—N/a
2026	"Rise Again" (오래된 음악가의 추억) (Nostalgia Demo Ver.)	Onewe	Studio We: Recording #4	RBW Entertainment	Yes	Harin	No	—N/a
2026	"Solar Halo Ring" (바다에 적신 햇무리 반지) (Wedding Ver.)	Onewe	Studio We: Recording #4	RBW Entertainment	Yes	Bydor Archive	Yes	Kanghyun, Gray Dot, Bydor Archive
2026	"You & Me" (너 하고 나) (feat. Giuk)	Divine	Non-album single	—N/a	Yes	Divine	Yes	Divine
2026	"Coordinates" (좌표)	Onewe	點: The Quiver	RBW Entertainment	Yes	Kanghyun, Bydor Archive	No	—N/a
2026	"Compass" (나침반)	Onewe	點: The Quiver	RBW Entertainment	Yes	Bydor Archive	Yes	Bydor Archive, wez
2026	"Icarus"	Onewe	點: The Quiver	RBW Entertainment	Yes	Kanghyun, Bydor Archive	No	—N/a
2026	"Fly"	Onewe	點: The Quiver	RBW Entertainment	Yes	Dongmyeong, Bydor Archive	Yes	Dongmyeong, Bydor Archive, wez
2026	"Neverland" (우리들은 행방불명)	Onewe	線: The Wake	RBW Entertainment	Yes	Bydor Archive	Yes	Bydor Archive, Kanghyun, wez
2026	"Scenario" (우리들은 행방불명)	Onewe	面: Unknown Atlas	RBW Entertainment	Yes	X3RO, Harin	No	—N/a
2026	"Tinker Bell" (피크요정)	Onewe	面: Unknown Atlas	RBW Entertainment	Yes	Bydor Archive, Kanghyun	Yes	Gray Dot, Bydor Archive
2026	"Fairy Tale" (동화)	Onewe	面: Unknown Atlas	RBW Entertainment	Yes	Kanghyun	No	—N/a
2026	"Lilliput" (소인국)	Onewe	面: Unknown Atlas	RBW Entertainment	Yes	Kanghyun, Bydor Archive	No	—N/a
2026	"Laputa" (피크요정)	Onewe	面: Unknown Atlas	RBW Entertainment	Yes	Kanghyun, Bydor Archive	No	—N/a
2026	"Pinocchio" (피투성이 피노키오)	Onewe	面: Unknown Atlas	RBW Entertainment	Yes	Bydor Archive	Yes	Bydor Archive, wez, Choi Min-ho
2026	"Imposter"	Onewe	面: Unknown Atlas	RBW Entertainment	Yes	Harin	No	—N/a

== Music video production credits ==
Year	Song	Artist	Album	Credited	Ref
2023	"Love Virus♥ (2050)" (feat. Sunwoo)	Giuk	Psycho Xybernetics : Turn Over	Co-director	
