= RBW (company) =

South Korean entertainment company

RBW Inc.
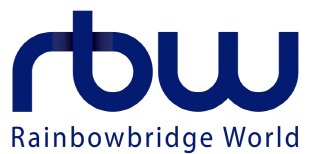
- Native name: (주)알비더블유
- Type: Public
- Traded as: KRX: 361570
- Industry: Music
- Genre: K-pop; R&B; Hip hop; Rock
- Predecessor: Rainbow Bridge Agency; WA Entertainment
- Founded: March 5, 2010; 16 years ago (as Rainbowbridge Agency); March 6, 2015; 11 years ago (as RBW)
- Founder: Kim Jin-woo
- Headquarters: Seoul, South Korea
- Number of locations: Head Office RBW Tower, 129 Jayang-ro, Gwangjin-gu, Seoul, South Korea; Incubating Center (Note: Former head office, main label's artists are still stationed at the Incubation Center, as of 2023.) B1, 20-gil 7, Janghan-ro, Dongdaemun-gu, Seoul, South Korea; RBW Japan 3F, 3-7-1, Higashiyama, Meguro-ku, Tokyo, Japan
- Key people: Kim Jin-woo (CEO); Kim Do-hoon (Chief Executive Producer); Kim Kyung-ho (Vice President, CFO); Lim In-yong (Vice President, Broadcast Promotion)
- Revenue: ▲ ₩ 37.2 billion (2020)
- Operating income: ▲ ₩ 7.6 billion (2020)
- Owner: Kim Jin-woo – 17.85%; Kim Do-hoon – 14.81%; Com2uS – 9.79%; Wysiwyg Studios – 5.22%; Others (52.33%)
- Number of employees: 101 (as of 2024)
- Subsidiaries: See below
- Website: rbbridge.com rbwjapan.jp

RBW (Korean: 알비더블유; an acronym for Rainbow Bridge World) is a South Korean entertainment company founded by Kim Jin-woo (김진우) and Kim Do-hoon (김도훈). The company has multiple subsidiaries, including DSP Media, StrangeLab Inc., Urban Works Media, and the IP management company Contents X.

One of the leading entertainment companies in South Korea, RBW operates as a record label, talent agency, music production company, event management company, concert production company, and music publishing house. In addition, the company operates various subsidiary ventures and divisions worldwide.

Including all its subsidiary labels, RBW is home to many notable artists under the agency such as the groups Mamamoo, Oh My Girl, KARD, Onewe, Young Posse and XLOV.

== History ==
=== 2010–2014: Early formation and debut of Mamamoo ===
Kim Jin-woo originally was the representative director of Cube Entertainment's Music Cube. Kim Jin-woo was in charge of the practice room rental business and then expanded his business with opening AN Bridge, Rainbow Bridge Academy and ENB Academy Practical Music Academy, which integrated under the name Modern & Bridge. On March 5, 2010, he later established the first OEM company, Rainbow Bridge Agency, which operates to train students who are not trainees with similar process as the regular entertainment company, such as vocal, dance, acting, language, etc.

In August 2011, Hwang Sung-jin (former Music Cube producer) and Kim Do-hoon (former Music Cube director) joined Kim Jin-woo's Modern & Bridge and took representative and director positions.

In March 2012, Kim Do-hoon joined corporation with Rainbow Bridge Agency's established music label, WA Entertainment. On August 16, WA Entertainment along with Brand New Music debuted Hip hop trio Phantom. In December 2012, Hip hop duo Geeks signed with WA Entertainment.

On June 18, 2014, WA Entertainment debuted its first girl group Mamamoo. They would go on to become the label's first successful artist and most profitable group. Beyond achieving commercial success both domestically and overseas as a group, all four members of Mamamoo have established themselves as solo artists in the K-pop industry.

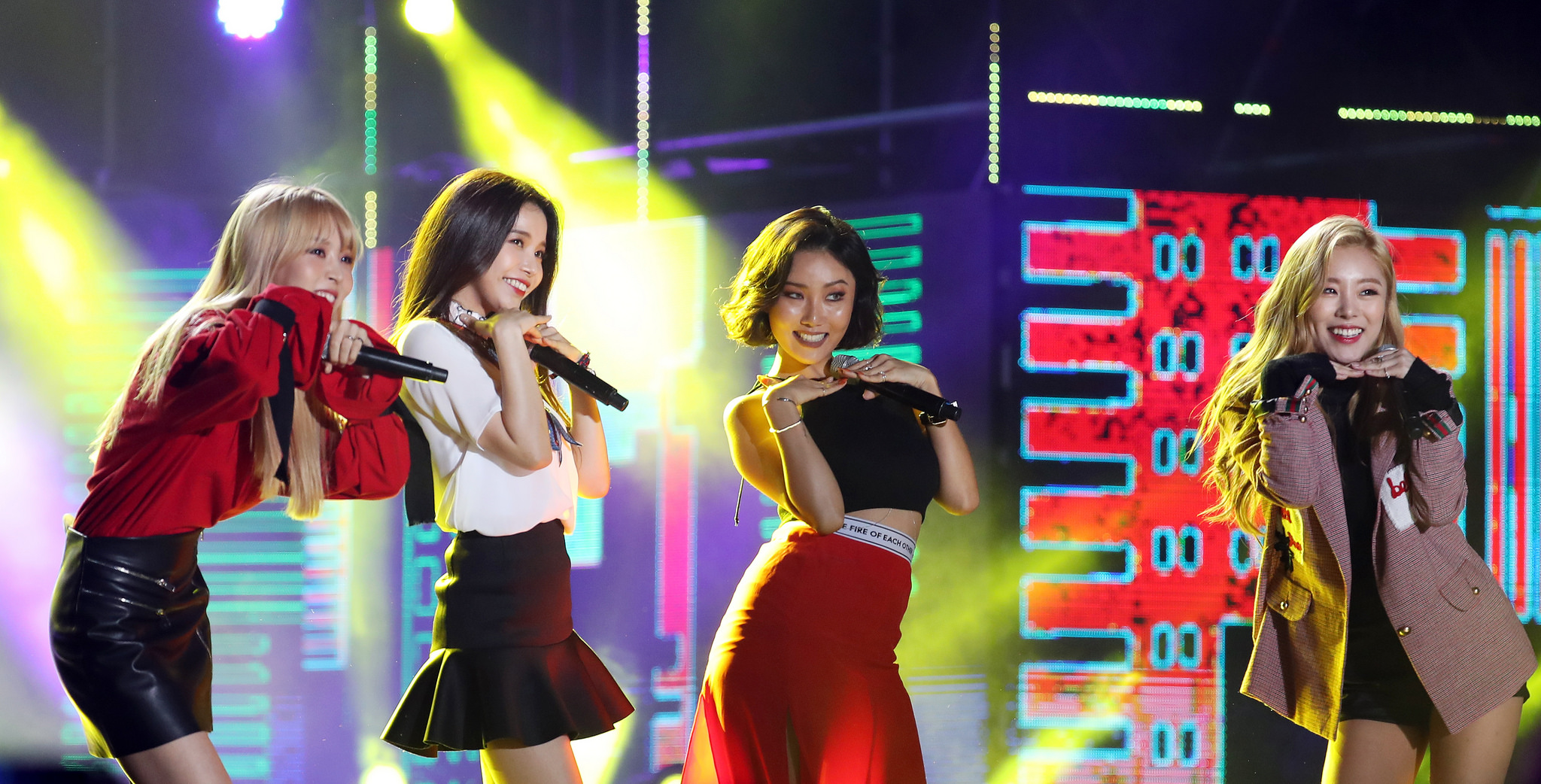
Mamamoo in 2016. Renowned for their vocal prowess, they have become one of the leading South Korean girl groups; receiving numerous accolades and worldwide success, most notably with "HIP" (2019) becoming a number-one hit on the Billboard World Digital Song Sales chart.

In August, WA Entertainment debuted composer Esna as a solo singer. In September 2014, WA Entertainment along with TSN Entertainment debuted brother duo OBROJECT.

=== 2015–2020: Merger into RBW, subsidiaries & debut of Oneus and Onewe ===
In March 2015, WA Entertainment merged with Rainbow Bridge Agency to create an independent label RBW (acronym for Rainbow Bridge World). In September 2015, Yangpa signed with RBW. In December 2015, rapper Basick and Big Tray signed with RBW.

In June 2016, Monday Kiz signed with RBW. On July 12, 2016, RBW debuted vocal group Vromance.

On June 9, 2017, RBW confirmed that rock band M.A.S 0094 joined the label, as well as the changing of the band name to MAS (acronym for Make A Sound).

In May 2018, Jinju, the winner of Vietnam's Hidden Singer joined RBW as its first artist in Vietnam. In February 2020, RBW Vietnam debuted D1verse, the first Vietnamese musical group under a Korean label.

On January 9, 2019, RBW debuted the six-member boy group Oneus. On May 13, boy band MAS made its re-debut as Onewe. Onewe and Oneus are considered to be brother groups, and share a history of collaborations, including a pre-debut single "Last Song" featuring all eleven members together. They also share real twin brothers, one in each group; Xion (the youngest in Oneus) and Dongmyeong (the keyboardist and lead vocal in Onewe).

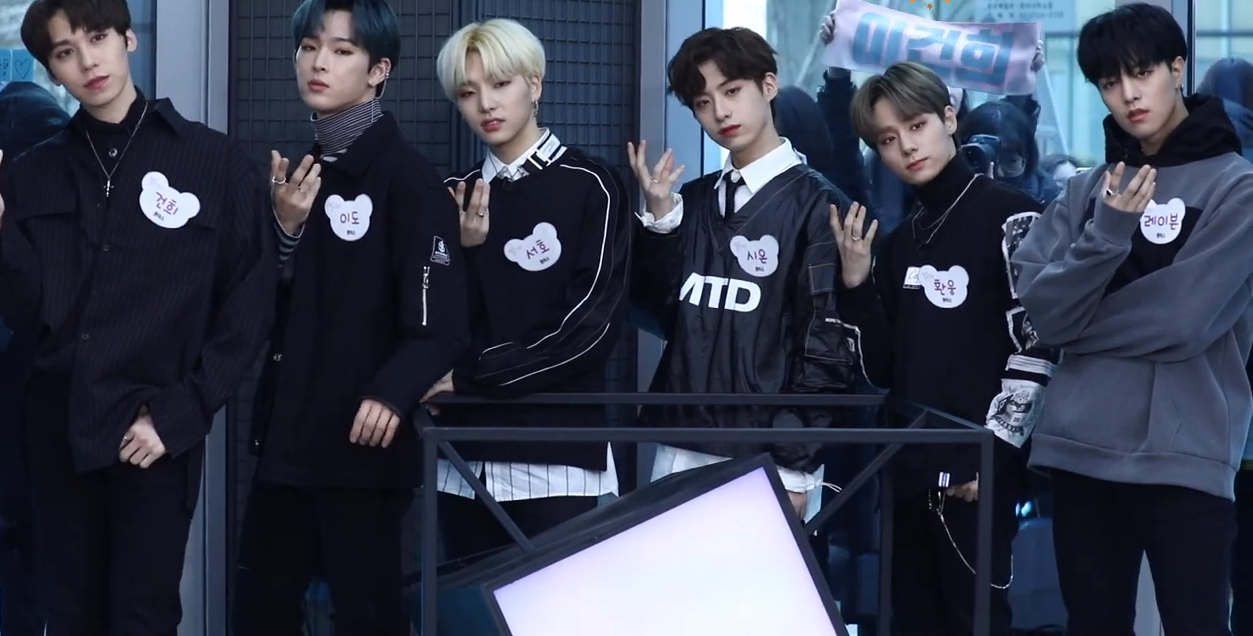
Oneus in 2019. They are known for their bold, theatrical concepts and storylines. The use of literature, symbolism, variation of colors and hues stands out in the intricate planning and execution of each of their releases.

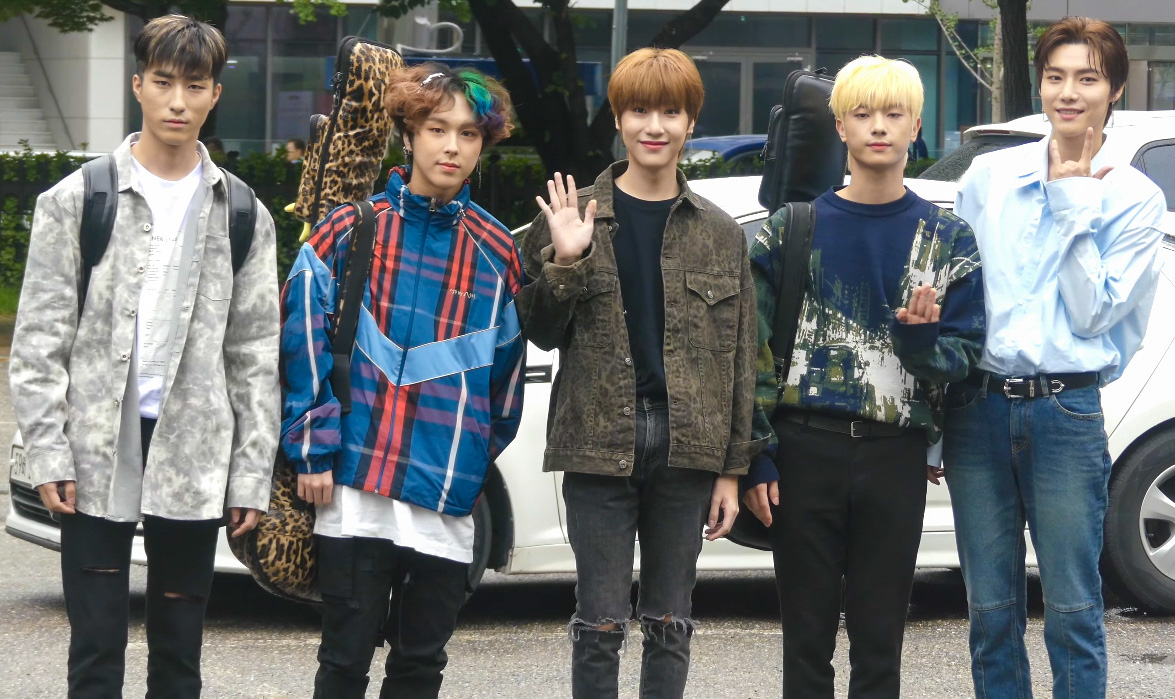
Onewe in 2019. As a self-producing band, they are known for having strong creative control over their music. All members contribute to the creation of their albums, from writing to composing to arranging their songs.

=== 2021–2022: Public listing, acquisitions & Wheein's departure ===
On March 15, 2021, RBW debuted the 7-member girl group Purple Kiss. On April 7, it was announced that RBW purchased the 70% shares of WM Entertainment, which houses idol groups such as B1A4 and Oh My Girl. They will be merged into RBW as a subsidiary.

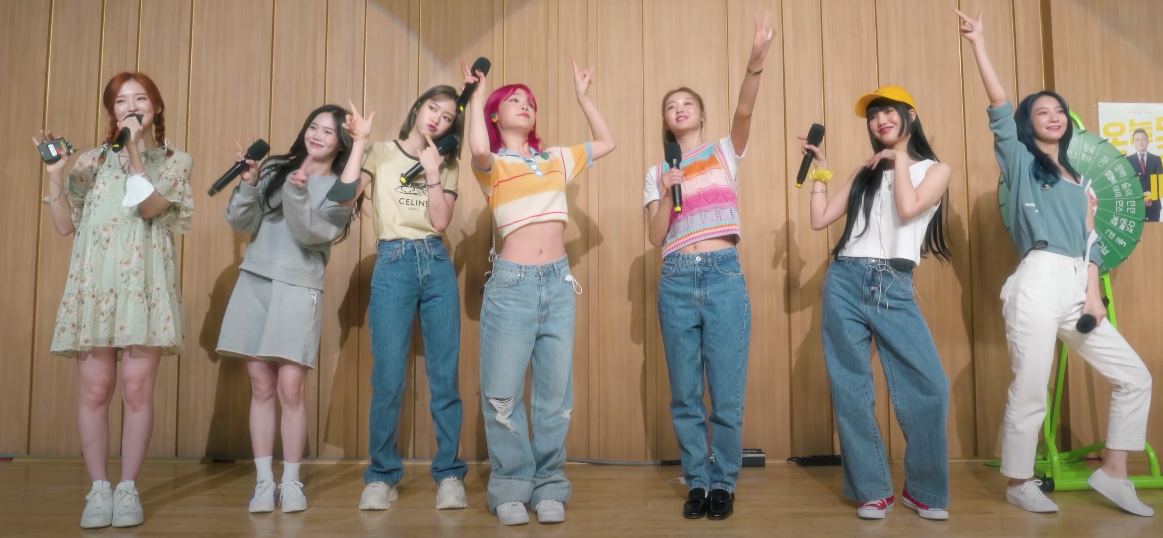
Oh My Girl in 2021. Their signature is ethereal and bubbly concepts, a style which they have kept consistent throughout their over eight-year career. They achieved widespread domestic recognition after a successful stint on Mnet reality competition series Queendom.

On June 11, RBW issued a statement confirming that Wheein would not renew her exclusive contract with the agency, although she will continue to promote with Mamamoo for group activities as she has signed an expanded agreement to participate in some activities, including albums and concerts, until December 2023. On November 22, RBW began public offering on KOSDAQ.

On January 26, 2022, it was announced that RBW purchased the 39.1% shares of DSP Media, which houses idol groups such as Kard and Mirae. They will be merged into RBW as a subsidiary. Kim Jin-woo, founder and CEO of RBW, has also become a CEO of DSP Media. On December 14, it was announced that DSP Media has merged with Goodfellas Entertainment on December 1, obtaining all exclusive rights to Goodfellas' artists and intellectual property.

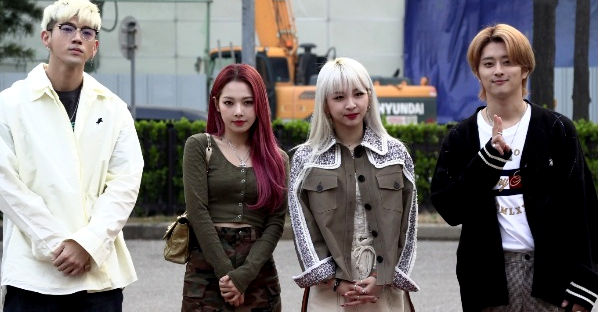
KARD in 2019. One of the most well-known co-ed groups in K-pop, where mixed-gender acts are a rarity. With a discography that largely focuses on reggaetón, contemporary house and dancehall vibes, they appeal to the international market, particularly South America.

On September 19, 2022, it was announced that Kara would be releasing an album under RBW to commemorate the 15th anniversary of their debut in November, with Nicole and Jiyoung rejoining the group. The group was originally formed by DSP Media, which RBW had acquired earlier in the year. Their extended play, titled Move Again, was released on November 29, with its first reveal taking place at the 2022 MAMA Awards in Japan.

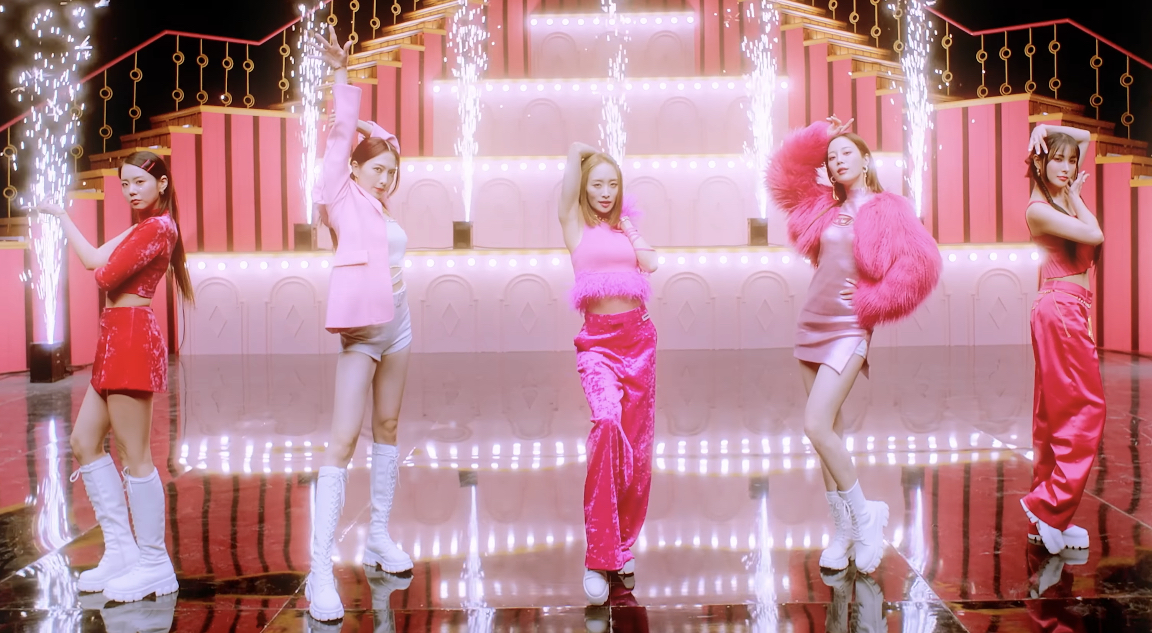
KARA in 2022. Having debuted in 2007, they are regarded as an iconic South Korean girl group of the second generation of K-pop. Since their disbandment in 2016, they had been on hiatus as a group until their reunion in 2022.

On December 29, it was announced that RBW acquired 50 percent of Urban Works Media for ₩10 billion ($7.88 million) to become the largest shareholder of the label. The deal was signed on January 2, 2023, and the payment will be made in full by the first half of 2023.

=== 2023–present: Recent developments ===
On June 1, 2023, it was announced that DSP will be taking over the actor management business of Jikim Entertainment and Urban Works Media, Jikim's former CEO Kim Jin-il will be leading the actor's department at DSP.

RBW took over music production for soloist Lee Chae-yeon's second extended play, Over the Moon which was released on April 12, 2023. Though reception was initially lukewarm, the album's lead single "Knock" became a sleeper hit thanks to its popularity in TikTok challenges and peaked at 25 on Melon's real-time Top 100 Chart.

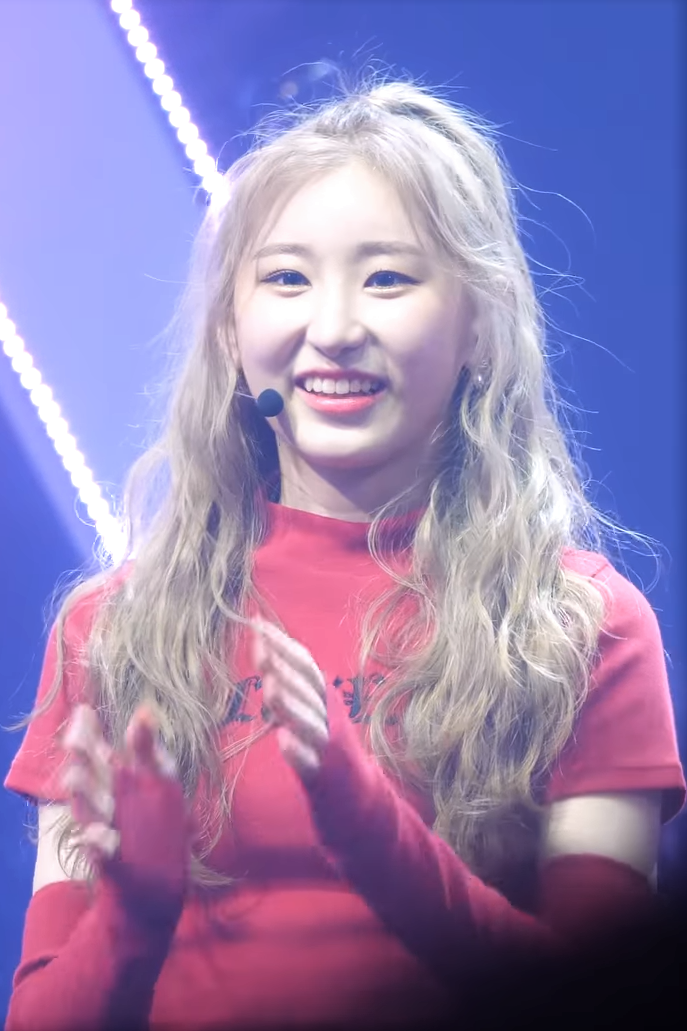
Soloist Chaeyeon in 2018. A former member of the South Korean–Japanese girl group Iz*One.

In June 2023, it was reported that Contents X, a subsidiary established by RBW in 2019, was responsible for the global marketing for the unexpected hit song "Cupid" by South Korean girl group Fifty Fifty which went viral worldwide and charted on the Billboard Hot 100 and the UK Singles Chart.

On July 16, 2023, RBW held its first large-scale family concert titled RBW 2023 SUMMER FESTIVAL: Over the Rainbow which featured various artists from their roster including Mamamoo+, B1A4, Oh My Girl, ONF, Oneus, Lee Chae-yeon and many more. Held at a sold-out SK Olympic Handball Gymnasium in Olympic Park, Seoul, the four-hour concert encompassed a wide range of hit songs from each artist as well as special collaboration stages. A Japanese edition of RBW 2023 SUMMER FESTIVAL: Over the Rainbow is scheduled to take place over two days at the Tokyo Garden Theater from August 19–20, the following month.

== Subsidiaries ==
=== Sub-labels ===
==== Cloud R ====
On May 27, 2016, RBW joint cooperation with Lee Seong-yeon established the independent sub-label. It was house to M.A.S 0094, a 5-member rock band managed by Modern Music. Its management was transferred to RBW in 2017 and they redebuted as Onewe in 2019 under the main label.

==== All Right Music ====
All Right Music is an independent Hip hop label headed by rapper Basick and RBW producer Im Sang-hyuk. Established in March 2017, the label was set up by RBW to focus on the hip hop scene. It was introduced their first artist: Big Tray, Marvel J and B.O.

==== RBW Vietnam ====
In 2016, RBW established a sub agency in Vietnam, joint-ventured with Naver, for future auditions and artist development in the region. The label introduced its first artist Jin Ju, a Korean student who won on the Vietnamese singing competition program Masked Singer, in 2018 with her debut single "Petal", released in both Korean and Vietnamese.

RBW launched the Vietnamese boy band D1Verse in February 2020. The group was formed by an all-Vietnamese cast and it was the first vocal group in Vietnam to be produced and managed by a K-pop label.

==== RBW Japan ====
In 2017, RBW established a sub agency in Japan for future auditions and artist development in the region. RBW announced Mamamoo's Japan debut in October 2018, working with local label Victor Entertainment as its music distributor, followed by Oneus and Onewe in 2019, distributed by Kiss Entertainment and Gem records respectively.

In 2023, the agency started to represent non-exclusive Korean artists for their Japan activities. I.e. CSR, actor Gong Yoo and Joo Won. In the same year, the agency obtained a 9-story property in Shinjuku, Tokyo as the new office.

==== Modern RBW ====
RBW producer Kim Hyunkyu and Modern K Music Academy combined to form a new sub-label "Modern RBW" which aims to promote aspiring artists to try get recognised with a projects series release of singles.

==== Strange Lab (formerly WM Entertainment) ====
On April 7, 2021, RBW announced that they have acquired WM Entertainment, the agency of group Oh My Girl. The two companies aim to work on creating synergy through close cooperation. With this acquisition, WM Entertainment will operate as an independent label of RBW and maintain its current management. WM Entertainment also acquired 257 Entertainment, the company of genderless group XLOV, in March 2026. WM Entertainment and 257 Entertainment would later integrate in August 2026, becoming Strange Lab, with Oh My Girl moving to DSP Media and XLOV remaining with the newly integrated Strange Lab.

==== DSP Media ====
In January 2022, RBW announced that they have acquired the management rights of DSP Media, the agency of groups Kard and Mirae. The two companies aim to work on creating synergy through close cooperation. With this acquisition, DSP Media will operate as an independent label of RBW and maintain its current management.

In December 2022, DSP Media announced that they have merged with Goodfellas Entertainment. All exclusive artists under Goodfellas will be transferred to DSP and the CEO will be joining the label as the executive producer.

In June 2023, DSP Media announced that they are taking over the actor management business of Jikim Entertainment and Urban Works Media, Jikim's former CEO Kim Jin-il will be leading the actor's department at DSP. DSP Media took Oh My Girl after WM entertainment integrated with 257 Entertainment to Strange Lab.

==== Urban Works Media ====
On December 29, 2022, RBW announced that they acquired 50 percent of Urban Works for ₩10 billion ($7.88 million) to become the largest shareholder of the label. The deal was signed on January 2, 2023, and the payment will be made in full by the first half of 2023.

In June 2023, it was announced that DSP Media will be taking over the management of Urban Works' artists.

In September, 2024, RBW sold 50 percent of its stake in Urban Works Media, relinquishing the company from their consolidated subsidiaries.

== Exclusive artists ==
=== RBW ===
==== Groups ====
- Mamamoo
- Onewe
- Secret
- NXD (pre-debut)

==== Duos ====
- Mamamoo+

==== Soloists ====
- Moonbyul
- Solar
- Giuk
- Rachel
- David Yong
- Kwon Eun-bi

=== StageGroup Inc. ===
==== Group ====
- XLOV

==== Soloists ====
- Lu

=== DSP Media ===
==== Groups ====
- Kard
- Young Posse
- Oh My Girl

==== Duos ====
- Baby Blue

==== Soloists ====
- BM
- J.Seph
- Somin
- Jiwoo
- Son Dong-pyo
- Lee Jin-jae
- Ahn Ye-eun
- H:code
- Kim Yu-na
- Oyeon
- Hyojung
- Mimi

==== Actors ====
- Lee Ji-hyun
- Lee Joong-ok
- Lee Hyung-hoon
- Oh Hye-won
- Chung Ye-jin
- Yoon Jung-hoon
- Ahn Seo-hyun
- Lee Seo-young
- Ju Hyeon
- Seong Tae
- Hwang Kyung-ha
- Han Jei
- Kim Chae-won
- Kim Min (2023–present)

== Studio artists ==
=== RBW ===
==== Session musicians ====
- Rb-inj - string session, co-founded with I.N.J Orchestra.
- Onewe - also active as session musicians. (Note: Most notably Kanghyun, participating as a session guitarist in a number of studio works by other RBW artists. Including Mamamoo's Better than I Thought, Oneus' Valkyrie (Rock ver.) and Purple Kiss' Twinkle, etc.)

==== Record producers & songwriters ====
- Kim Do-hoon (김도훈) - Chief Executive Producer & co-CEO. Main Producer of Mamamoo.
- Lee Sang-ho (이상호) - Director. Main Producer of Oneus, member of producing crew Masked Knights.
- Hwang Sung-jin (황성진) - Director. Music Cube producer.
- Kim Hyun-kyu (김형규) - Director. Also CEO of Modern K Practical Music Academy.
- Kwon Suk-hong (권석홍) - Director. Music Director of Rb-inj.
- Song Jun-ho (송준호) - Principal of Rainbow Bridge Music Academy, Director of WM Entertainment.
- Seo Yong-bae (서용배) - Member of Masked Knights and producing duo Igi-yongbae.
- Choi Gap-won (최갑원)
- Choi Yong-chan (최용찬) - Also active as indie singer-songwriter lunCHbox.
- Yun Young-jun (윤영준)
- Im Sang-hyuck (임상혁) - A.k.a. Leemssang. President of All Right Music, member of producing crew Firebat
- Jeon Da-woon (전다운) - Main Producer of Onewe, member of Firebat
- Kim Ki-hyun (김기현) - A.k.a. Adam H. Evans or Cosmic Sound.
- Lee Hoo-Sang (이후상)
- Park Ji-young (박지영) - A.k.a. Davve, Main Producer of Purple Kiss.
- Yoo Joo-yi (유주이) - A.k.a. Cosmic Girl, singer-songwriter and former Rania member.

=== DSP Media ===
- Min Myeong-gi (민명기) - Chief Producer. Former CEO of Goodfellas Entertainment.
- Lee Seok-joo (이석주) - Former Goodfellas Entertainment producer.
- Lee Yul-i (이율이) - Former Goodfellas Entertainment composer.

== Awards ==
=== 2011 ===
- 1st Korean Music Copyright Awards - Composer in Rock category [CEO Kim Do Hoon, Lee Sang Ho]

=== 2014 ===
- 6th MelOn Music Awards - Best Songwriter [CEO Kim Do Hoon]
- 4th Gaon Chart KPop Awards - Composer of the Year [CEO Kim Do Hoon]

=== 2015 ===
- 1st KOMCA Awards - Grand Prize in Composition, Popular Music [CEO Kim Do Hoon]
- Korean Ministry of Commerce, Industry & Energy - Young Entrepreneur [CEO Kim Jin Woo]
- Seoul Metropolitan Police Agency - Commissioner's Commendation for Appreciation [CEO Kim Jin Woo]

=== 2016 ===
- Korea Business Management Awards - Best in Popular Culture [CEO Kim Jin Woo]

=== 2017 ===
- 3rd KOMCA Awards - Grand Prize in Composition, Popular Music [CEO Kim Do Hoon]
- 1st Soribada Best K-Music Awards - Best Producer [Seo Yong Bae and Iggy]
- Korea Entertainment Producers Association - Organizer of the Year [CEO Kim Jin Woo]

=== 2018 ===
- 2nd Soribada Best K-Music Awards - Best Producer [CEO Kim Do Hoon]
- Vietnam V LIVE 2017 - Best Program Award [CEO Kim Jin Woo]

=== 2019 ===
- Korean Ministry of Culture, Sport, and Tourism - Minister's Prize [CEO Kim Jin Woo]

=== 2020 ===
- 17th Korea Startup Award - Minister of Small and Medium Venture Business Award [CEO Kim Jin Woo]
- 4th Soribada Best K-Music Awards - Best Producer [CEO Kim Do Hoon]

== Former artists ==
=== RBW ===
- ESna (2014–2017)
- Yangpa (2015–2018)
- Monday Kiz (2016–2018)
- Mamamoo
  - Wheein (2014–2021; moved to The L1ve, but continues to participate in group activities)
  - Hwasa (2014–2023)
- Vromance (2016–2024)
  - Yoon Euno (formerly known as Lee Chandong, 2016–2022; moved to Gleam Artist to focus on his career as a musical actor)
- Kara (2022–2023) (Note: While no official disbandment was announced, Kara's artist profile was removed in 2024, signifying the group is no longer active under the label.)
- Purple Kiss (2020–2025)
- Oneus (2019–2026)

Co-managed

- Geeks (2012–2016) (co-managed with How Entertainment; moved to Grandline Entertainment)
- Phantom (2012–2017) (co-managed with Brand New Music; disbanded)
- P.O.P (2017–2018) (co-managed with DWM Entertainment; disbanded)
- OBROJECT (co-managed with TSN Entertainment) (2014–2019; disbanded)
- Co-managed with Duckfuss Entertainment (2020–2021)
  - Kim Yuna
  - Obze
  - OYEON

All Right Music

- Basick (2015–2018; founded Outlive)
- B.O. (2017–2020; founded MYFB.)
- Big Tray (2015–?)
- Marvel J (2017–?; moved to Luminant Entertainment)

Cloud R

- Mas (2017–2019; re-debuted as Onewe under the main label)

RBW Vietnam

- Jin-Ju (2018–2020; moved to Krazy Sound)
- D1Verse (2019–2021; Vietnam sub-label ceased operations in 2020, hence putting group activities in suspension, formally disbanded in 2021)
  - Trần Bình (2019–2020; contract terminated over misconduct)

==== Producers ====
- Park Woo-sang (박우상) (left in 2021)
- Kim Min-gi (김민기) (a.k.a. 밍키, Mingkey) (left in 2022)

=== DSP Media ===
- April (2015–2022, disbanded)
  - Somin (2015)
  - Hyunjoo (2015–2016)
  - Chaewon (2015–2022)
  - Naeun (2015–2022)
  - Yena (2015–2022)
  - Jinsol (2015–2022)
  - Chaekyung (2016–2022)
  - Rachel (2016–2022)
- Mirae (2021–2024, disbanded)
  - Lien (2021–2024)
  - Lee Jun-hyuk (2021–2024)
  - Yoo Dou-hyun (2021–2024)
  - Khael (2021–2024)
  - Park Si-young (2021–2024)
  - Jang Yu-bin (2021–2024)

=== WM Entertainment ===
- B1A4 (2011–2025)
  - Jinyoung (2011–2018)
  - Baro (2011–2018)
  - CNU (2011–2025)
  - Sandeul (2011–2025)
  - Gongchan (2011–2025)
- Oh My Girl
  - JinE (2015–2017)
  - Jiho (2015–2022)
  - YooA (2015–2025)
  - Arin (2015–2025)
- ONF (2017–2026)
  - Laun (2017–2019)
  - Hyojin (2017–2026)
  - E-Tion (2017–2026)
  - Seungjun (2017–2026)
  - Wyatt (2017–2026)
  - Minkyun (2017–2026)
  - U (2017–2026)
- Lee Chae-yeon (2018–2025)
