= 2024 in South Korean music =

The following is a list of notable events and releases that have happened in 2024 in music in South Korea.

== Award shows and festivals ==
=== Award ceremonies ===
2024 music award ceremonies in South Korea
Date	Event	Host	Ref.
January 2	33rd Seoul Music Awards	Sports Seoul	
January 6	38th Golden Disc Awards	Ilgan Sports and JTBC Plus	
January 10	13th Circle Chart Music Awards	Korea Music Content Association	
February 17 and 18	31st Hanteo Music Awards	Hanteo Global	
September 8	2024 The Fact Music Awards	The Fact	
November 21–23	26th MAMA Awards	CJ ENM Entertainment Division	
November 30	16th Melon Music Awards	Kakao Entertainment	
December 27	9th Asia Artist Awards	Star News and Star Continent	

=== Festivals ===
2024 televised music festivals in South Korea
Date	Event	Host	Ref.
July 21	SBS Gayo Daejeon: Summer	Seoul Broadcasting System (SBS)	
December 20	KBS Song Festival	Korean Broadcasting System (KBS)	
December 25	SBS Gayo Daejeon: Winter	Seoul Broadcasting System (SBS)	
December 31	MBC Gayo Daejejeon	Munhwa Broadcasting Corporation (MBC)	

== Debuting and disbanding in 2024 ==
=== Debuting groups ===
==== Male groups ====
- 13Found
- Aeonit
- All(H)Ours
- ARrC
- Asc2nt
- B.D.U
- Big Ocean
- Dragon Pony
- Dxmon
- Nchive
- NND
- NOMAD
- Nowadays
- TIOT
- TWS
- Waker
- Waterfire

===== Sub-units =====
- 90Tan
- Jeonghan X Wonwoo

==== Female groups ====
- Artms
- Babymonster
- Badvillain
- Candy Shop
- Geenius
- Genblue
- Illit
- Izna
- Madein
- Meovv
- Odd Youth
- Rescene
- Say My Name
- Unis
- VVUP
- Witchx

===== Sub-units =====
- Aria

=== Solo debuts ===
- Cha Eun-woo
- Chanyeol
- Doyoung
- Gyubin
- Hui
- Irene
- Jaehyun
- Kim Dong-hyuk
- Jinho
- Koo Jun-hoe
- L
- Lay Zhang
- Lee Seung-hoon
- Lucas
- Naevis
- Simaron
- Seola
- Song Yunhyeong
- Sungjin
- Ten
- Tzuyu
- Wooseok
- Yeonjun
- Yoon San-ha
- Yuqi
- Yves

=== Disbandments ===
- 3YE
- Cherry Bullet
- Cignature
- Fanatics
- Mirae
- Nature
- Pink Fantasy
- Rocket Punch
- TFN
- Vromance
- Weki Meki

== Releases in 2024 ==
=== First quarter ===
==== January ====
Date	Album	Artist(s)	Ref.
3	Brilliant Seasons	Kim Jong-hyeon	
4	Quiz	Jeong Se-woon	
8	Born to Be	Itzy	
8	Connect	B1A4	
8	Sequence	SF9	
8	Mission of School	Waker	
9	Stunning	8Turn	
9	Restart	Kyuhyun	
10	All Ours	All(H)Ours	
10	Things I Can't Say Love	OnlyOneOf	
11	Chapter 2. Wings	BXB	
11	Parting Emotion	Niel	
11	Last Dance	LimeLight	
15	Fe3O4: Break	Nmixx	
15	Good Morning	Choi Ye-na	
15	Structure of Sadness	Aria	
16	Whu Is Me: Complex	Hui	
17	Hyperspace	Dxmon	
22	Un: Seen	Evnne	
22	Sparkling Blue	TWS	
22	The Future Is Ours: Found	AB6IX	
23	Inside Out	Seola	
24	0 or 1	CIX	
24	2Rox	Ryu Su-jeong	
29	2	(G)I-dle	
30	Capture the Flag	Vanner	

==== February ====
Date	Album	Artist(s)	Ref.
1	Reminiscence	Kim Min-seok	
5	Killin' It	P1Harmony	
13	Ten	Ten	
14	Our: YouthTeen	The Wind	
15	Happy &	N.SSign	
15	Entity	Cha Eun-woo	
15	Nakseo	Kim Dong-hyuk	
16	The Young Man and the Deep Sea	Im Hyun-sik	
19	Easy	Le Sserafim	
20	Starlit of Muse	Moonbyul	
20	The Winning	IU	
21	Trust Me	Yugyeom	
22	My Girl: "My Choice"	A.C.E	
22	Journey	Kim Bum-soo	
23	With You-th	Twice	
24	Empty Paper	Wooseok	
26	Tap	Taeyong	
26	Asterum: 134-1	Plave	
26	Evershine	Cravity	
28	Nomad	NOMAD	

==== March ====
Date	Album	Artist(s)	Ref.
2	Daytour	Hori7on	
4	희로애락(喜怒哀樂)	Kim Hee-jae	
6	It's Call!	Song	
6	Full Bloom	Kassy	
7	Feelin' Hot	Ichillin'	
8	House of Tricky: Trial and Error	Xikers	
10	My Cosmos	Lee Byung-chan	
11	Tempest Voyage	Tempest	
11	Switch On	Highlight	
12	Wish You Hell	Wendy	
13	Buff	Lun8	
13	New Chapter: Luceat	BAE173	
14	Borderline	YooA	
15	Spring Canvas	Sevenus	
16	Wonder, I	NND	
18	Bad	Kim Nam-joo	
18	Phantasy: Pt.3 Love Letter	The Boyz	
18	Fourever	Day6	
19	BXX	Purple Kiss	
20	XXL	Young Posse	
25	Dream()scape	NCT Dream	
25	Super Real Me	Illit	
25	Beautiful Dystopia	Yong Jun-hyung	
26	606 (Six Zero Six)	Super Junior-D&E	
26	Re:Scene	Rescene	
27	Hashtag#	Candy Shop	
27	We Unis	Unis	
28	3TAN (World ver)	TAN	
28	2 Kids on the Block	Dynamic Duo	
29	Hope on the Street Vol. 1	J-Hope	
31	3	Bang Yong-guk	

=== Second quarter ===
==== April ====
Date	Album	Artist(s)	Ref.
1	Babymons7er	Babymonster	
1	Minisode 3: Tomorrow	Tomorrow X Together	
1	Renegade	Lucas	
1	Manito	QWER	
1	Locked On	Vvup	
2	Nowadays	Nowadays	
3	Off the Beat	I.M	
3	Midas Touch	Kiss of Life	
3	Fragments of Odyssey	Catch the Young	
3	Beautiful Maze	Drippin	
4	A Life	Kim Ho-joong	
4	Ganggangsullae	Song So-hee	
8	Beautiful Shadow	ONF	
9	Youth Chapter 1: Youth Days	Epex	
9	Drive	Nchive	
12	Reboot	DKZ	
15	How?	BoyNextDoor	
15	One of a Kind	Loossemble	
17	Planet Nine: Isotropy	Onewe	
19	My Fuxxxxx Romance	Park Won	
22	Bright; 燦	Lee Chan-won	
22	I Like the Way	Kim Woo-jin	
22	Youth	Doyoung	
22	Kick-Start	TIOT	
23	Yuq1	Yuqi	
23	New Quest: Jungle	Lee Jin-hyuk	
24	Affection	Be'O	
29	17 Is Right Here	Seventeen	
29	Ive Switch	Ive	
29	Beat by 82	82Major	
30	Realize	The KingDom	
30	Colours	Solar	
30	Troubleshooting	Xdinary Heroes	

==== May ====
Date	Album	Artist(s)	Ref.
1	Another	Younite	
2	Everlasting	E'Last	
2	Attitude	Hyuna	
2	If This Is Love, I Want a Refund	Kino	
2	Make Sunshine	Fantasy Boys	
7	Blossom	Doh Kyung-soo	
7	Expecting Tomorrow	Asc2nt	
8	I Adore	Kim Jae-hwan	
8	Assemble24	TripleS	
9	Exhibition: Look Closely	Yook Sung-jae	
13	You Had Me at Hello	Zerobaseone	
13	Memorabilia	Enhypen	
14	Hyperspace 911	Dxmon	
18	My Everything	Park Je-up	
21	X10	MCND	
23	Rizz	Soojin	
24	How Sweet	NewJeans	
24	Right Place, Wrong Person	RM	
27	Armageddon	Aespa	
28	Door	Chen	
29	Loop	Yves	
31	Golden Hour: Part.1	Ateez	
31	1 to 3	Suho	
31	DALL	Artms	

==== June ====
Date	Album	Artist(s)	Ref.
3	Kep1going On	Kep1er	
3	Love Episode	AKMU	
3	Overstep	Badvillain	
3	Memory Making Moment	W24	
5	Scene	Han Seung-woo	
9	Flower	Infinite	
10	Zombie	Everglow	
10	Sweetie but Saltie	Cignature	
12	Dreamlike	Trendz	
12	Girls Don't Cry	Candy Shop	
14	Na	Nayeon	
17	Ride or Die	Evnne	
17	Riizing	Riize	
17	This Man	Jeonghan X Wonwoo	
17	Unframed	Wooah	
17	Revival	Primrose	
18	Sabotage	Kwon Eun-bi	
19	Love or Hate	H1-Key	
19	Lunch-Box	Blitzers	
20	Pump	Epik High	
20	All the Way	K.Will	
20	Traveling Fish	Hwiyoung	
24	Summer Beat!	TWS	
24	Cosmic	Red Velvet	
25	Strawberry Rush	Chuu	
25	Let's Get Started	U-KISS	
26	Flower Garden	Kim Jae-joong	
26	Wishpool	B.D.U	
26	Re_	Craxy	
27	Blank	Rocky	

=== Third quarter ===
==== July ====
Date	Album	Artist(s)	Ref.
1	Metamorphic	STAYC	
2	Witness	All(H)Ours	
3	Showdown	Lee Chaeyeon	
3	Bruise	Ju-ne	
8	I Sway	(G)I-dle	
9	Bliss	Weeekly	
9	Hold X	NTX	
10	Serious	F.T. Island	
10	Virtuous	Dreamcatcher	
12	Romance: Untold	Enhypen	
14	Action	Apex	
15	Walk	NCT 127	
15	My Type	Lee Seung-hoon	
16	Sweet Tape	Waker	
17	Blessed	Ha Sung-woon	
17	Urban Ride	DKB	
18	Tiger	N.SSign	
19	Ate	Stray Kids	
19	Muse	Jimin	
24	I Do I Do	Kara	
24	Digmotion	Dignity	
31	Tang Tang Tang	90Tan	

==== August ====
Date	Album	Artist(s)	Ref.
2	Infuse	ONF	
5	Sfumato	Yoo Chae-hoon	
5	24/7	L	
6	Dusk	Yoon San-ha	
6	Curious	Unis	
7	Pose	Lightsum	
8	Curtain Call	Bang & Jung & Yoo & Moon	
8	Bamesis	BamBam	
9	Time Machine	Sole	
12	Supersonic	Fromis 9	
13	Where to Now? (Part.1: Yellow Light)	Kard	
14	Awakening	Lun8	
14	From.	Lucy	
16	Reebon	Mimiirose	
19	Fe3O4: Stick Out	Nmixx	
19	Ar^c	ARrC	
19	Eternal	Taemin	
19	Fantasy	SF9	
19	Weekend	Drippin	
20	Illang: Firework	ILY:1	
21	Starlit of Twinkle	Moonbyul	
21	Ate That	Young Posse	
21	Eternal Bloom	Gyeongree	
23	Consolation & Love	Ken	
26	Cinema Paradise	Zerobaseone	
26	J	Jaehyun	
26	Dreamy Resonance	Oh My Girl	
27	Scenedrome	Rescene	
27	Nowhere	Nowadays	
28	Black Out	Chanyeol	
29	Good Vibes	Bang Ye-dam	
30	Crazy	Le Sserafim	

==== September ====
Date	Album	Artist(s)	Ref.
1	Growth Theory	Younha	
2	Band Aid	Day6	
2	TTYL	Loossemble	
3	SuperSuper	Young Tak	
3	Flow	Onew	
3	Rise	Madein	
4	Rewrite	Yerin	
4	Riizing: Epilogue	Riize	
6	Aboutzu	Tzuyu	
6	Hello, World	Baekhyun	
6	House of Tricky: Watch Out	Xikers	
9	19.99	BoyNextDoor	
19	Cho:rd	Jinho	
19	O	Hwasa	
20	Love Tune	Fifty Fifty	
20	Sad Song	P1Harmony	
23	Pleasure Shop	Key	
23	Act	Kang Daniel	
23	Algorithm's Blossom	QWER	
25	Some Day	Xodiac	
25	Inevitable	Super Junior-D&E	
26	Pop Up	Dragon Pony	
26	20	Jung Soo-min	
30	Rush of Joy	Whib	
30	Burn	Vanner	

=== Fourth quarter ===
==== October ====
Date	Album	Artist(s)	Ref.
2	1991	Lee Chang-sub	
4	Conversion Part.1	Asc2nt	
7	Hello: My First Love	The Wind	
7	Youth	Lee Mu-jin	
8	The One You Wanted	Jay Park	
9	Call Me Back	NOMAD	
10	Born Like This	AB6IX	
14	Live and Fall	Xdinary Heroes	
14	Spill the Feels	Seventeen	
14	X	CNBLUE	
15	Gold	Itzy	
15	X-82	82Major	
15	Lose Yourself	Kiss of Life	
16	Say My Name	Say My Name	
16	Appendix: Of All We Have Lost	Billlie	
18	Fallin'	One Pact	
21	I'll Like You	Illit	
21	Whiplash	Aespa	
21	Boyfriend	Pow	
21	Youth Never Die	Dxmon	
22	20	Cho Yong-pil	
22	Headway	Purple Kiss	
22	One Question	Ampers&One	
23	Elegy	Ha Hyun-sang	
24	Yeok Seong	Lee Seung-yoon	
28	Trigger	The Boyz	
28	Shine	Son Tae-jin	
29	Cliché	Jukjae	
30	Psst!	John Park	
30	...I	STAYC	
31	Peter	Moon Jong-up	

==== November ====
Date	Album	Artist(s)	Ref.
1	Tipi-tap	Kep1er	
1	Drip	Babymonster	
4	The Star Chapter: Sanctuary	Tomorrow X Together	
4	Call Back	Minho	
5	30	Sungjin	
5	It's Complicated	Yesung	
5	Youth Chapter 2: Youth Deficiency	Epex	
5	Turn	Simaron	
6	Growth Ring	Bumjin	
6	Fallin'	Heize	
7	Voyage	Viviz	
11	Romance: Untold -Daydream-	Enhypen	
11	Dreamscape	NCT Dream	
12	Follow	Big Ocean	
13	Found	13Found	
14	Love XX	Classy	
14	Steal Heart	Primrose	
14	I Did	Yves	
15	Happy	Jin	
15	Golden Hour: Part.2	Ateez	
18	Letter to Myself	Taeyeon	
18	Nallina	Nexz	
19	Zoom	Badvillain	
20	Pinata	A.C.E	
20	Stitch	Davichi	
22	Neighborhood	Jay Chang	
25	Last Bell	TWS	
25	N/a	Izna	
26	Like a Flower	Irene	
27	Colors	Kyuhyun	
27	Archive 1: Road Runner	Jay B	
28	My insecure	Yang Da-il	
29	Mellifluous	Park Je-up	
29	Re:new	D.Ark	

==== December ====
Date	Album	Artist(s)	Ref.
1	If It Happens, It Happens	Im Chang-jung	
2	Ordinary Grace	Baek Ji-young	
4	With	Lee Seung-gi	
4	Shine	Shin Yong-jae	
5	Find the Orbit	Cravity	
5	Last Night	Treasure	
6	Rosie	Rosé	
6	Strategy	Twice	
9	Winter Glow	Fifty Fifty	
10	Semicolon	Daybreak	
13	Hop	Stray Kids	
18	Christmas with You	Bang & Jung & Yoo & Moon	

== Top songs on record ==
=== Circle Digital Chart No. 1 Songs ===
- "Apt." – Rosé and Bruno Mars (9 weeks)
- "Bam Yang Gang" – Bibi (4 weeks)
- "Fate" – (G)I-dle (3 weeks)
- "Happy" – Day6 (5 weeks)
- "Home Sweet Home" - G-Dragon feat. Taeyang and Daesung (1 week)
- "Love, Money, Fame" – Seventeen feat. DJ Khaled (1 week)
- "Love Wins All" – IU (4 weeks)
- "Maestro" – Seventeen (1 week)
- "Magnetic" – Illit (3 weeks)
- "Melt Down" - Day6 (1 week)
- "Perfect Night" – Le Sserafim (4 weeks in 2023, 2 weeks in 2024)
- "Pump Up the Volume!" – Plave (1 week)
- "Rhapsody of Sadness" – Lim Jae-hyun (1 week)
- "Small Girl" – Lee Young-ji feat. D.O. (2 weeks)
- "Spot!" – Zico feat. Jennie (1 week)
- "Supernova" – Aespa (11 weeks)
- "Walk" – NCT 127 (1 week)
- "Warmth" – Lim Young-woong (1 week)

== Deaths ==
- Park Bo-ram, 30, singer
- Shinsadong Tiger, 40, producer and singer
