= Pentagon videography =

Korean Pop videography

Pentagon video discography
- Music videos: 24
- Special music video: 13
- Music clips: 9

This is the list of South Korean K-Pop boy band Pentagon videography. It includes music videos, music clips, variety shows, TV dramas and commercial films since its debut in 2016.

== Music video ==
=== As lead artist ===
==== Korean ====
Year	Title	Other versions	Published	Album	Director(s)	Length	Notes	Ref.
2016	"Gorilla"		Oct 9	Pentagon	Vikings League	3:35		
2016	"Can You Feel It"		Dec 6	Five Senses	Vikings League	3:26		
2017	"Pretty Pretty"		Jan 22	Five Senses	Unknown	3:20	Featuring Chungha	
2017	"Critical Beauty"		Jun 12	Ceremony	Vikings League	3:26	Yan An was absent	
2017	"To Universe"		July 25	Ceremony	Cube Ent. Visual Production	3:45	Mini Concert Tentastic Vol.2 - Trust moments	
2017	"When I Was in Love"		Sep 1	Demo_01	Bpm 권진모	2:00	Short film featuring Gong Seung-yeon	
2017	"Like This"		Sep 6	Demo_01	Flexible Pictures	3:45		
2017	"Runaway"		Nov 22	Demo_02	Flexible Pictures	3:29		
2017	"Violet"		Nov 23	Demo_02	Bpm 권진모	4:08	Featuring Seoni Hwang	
2018	"Shine"		April 22	Positive	Flexible Pictures	3:22	Last music video before E'Dawn's departure	
2018	"Naughty Boy"	Performance ver.	Sep 10	Thumbs Up!	Digipedi	3:34	Yan An was absent	
2019	"Sha La La"		March 27	Genie:us	Dee Shin	3:10		
2019	"Humph!"	Performance ver.	July 17	Sum(me:r)	Hong Won-ki (Zanybros)	3:17	Yan An was absent	
2020	"Dr. Bebe"	Performance ver.	February 12	Universe: The Black Hall	Unknown	3:57	Yan An was absent	
2020	"Basquiat"	Performance ver.	June 12	Road to Kingdom Final	Jay Jang (BIBBIDI BOBBIDI BOO.)	4:51	Yan An was absent	
2020	"Daisy"	Acoustic ver. Performance ver.	June 12	WE:TH	Jay Jang (BIBBIDI BOBBIDI BOO.)	3:33	Jinho was absent	
2021	"Do or Not"		March 15	Love or Take	Digipedi	3:48	Featuring Mix Nine's Kim Bo-won; Jinho was absent	
2022	"Feelin' Like"	Performance ver.	January 24	In:vite U		2:51	Hui was absent	

==== Japanese ====
Year	Title	Other versions	Published	Album/Single	Director(s)	Length	Notes	Ref.
2017	"Gorilla"			Gorilla	Hong Won-ki (Zanybros)	3:13		
2018	"Violet"		Jan 17	Violet	Bpm 권진모	4:11	Featuring Seoni Hwang	
2018	"Shine"		Aug 29	Shine	RIGEND FILM	3:20	Last music video before E'Dawn's departure	
2019	"Cosmo"	Performance ver.	Jan 9	Cosmo	Hong Won-ki (Zanybros)	4:13		
2019	"Sha La La"	Performance ver.	July 26	Happiness / Sha La La	Unknown	3:21		
2019	"Happiness"	Performance ver.	August 13	Happiness / Sha La La	Unknown	3:38		

=== As featured artist ===
Year	Title	Director(s)	Length	Notes	Ref.
2020	"I'm Loving You" (Pentagon and Glay)	Hong Won-ki (Zanybros)	3:40	Yanan was absent	

== Special music video ==
Year	Title	Artist(s)	Published	Director	Length	Notes	Ref.
2016	"Young" (젊어)	All	July 8		3:10	Predebut	
2017	"Romance (낭만)"	Kino & Hongseok	Aug 14	Cube Ent. Visual Production	3:09		
2017	"Let's Go (토닥토닥)"	Yeo One	Sep 11	Cube Ent. Visual Production	2:28		
2017	"Lift Off"	Wooseok ft. E'Dawn	Oct 10	Cube Ent. Visual Production	3:52		
2018	"Lonely"	Kino	Feb 15	Cube Ent. Visual Production	3:02		
2018	"Trust Me"	Yuto with Wooseok & E'Dawn	March 15	Cube Ent. Visual Production	3:25		
2018	"Hope"	Yeo One	Dec 20	Cube Ent. Visual Production	4:06		
2019	"The Greatest Wall"	Hui & Kino	Jan 11	Cube Ent. Visual Production	3:12	Lyrics version	
2019	"The Greatest Wall"	Hui & Kino	Jan 20	Cube Ent. Visual Production	3:11	Live version	
2019	"Genius"	All ft. Pentagon's fathers	April 22	Cube Ent. Visual Production	4:08		
2019	"Her Voice"	Yeo One	June 1	Cube Ent. Visual Production	2:45		
2019	"Badtiming"	Kino	October 5	Cube Ent. Visual Production	2:24		
2019	"La Di Da"	Hui & Kino	November 23	Cube Ent. Visual Production	3:55		
2019	"Gravity"	Jinho & Kino	December 31	Cube Ent. Visual Production	4:27		
2021	"Begin Again"	Yeo One	February 24	Cube Ent. Visual Production	4:00		

== Music clips ==
Year	Published	Title	Artist(s)	Length	Notes	Ref.
2016	December 28	"Happy Winter Song (겨울이 반가운 이유)"	Hui & Jinho	3:49	Live clip	
2017	May 18	"Beautiful (Prod. by Jung Il-hoon of BtoB)"	Pentagon	3:48		
2017	December 9	"Violet"	Pentagon	4:00	Animoji ver.	
2017	December 10	"Violet"	Pentagon	4:00	Original ver.	
2018	April 14	"Let's Go Together"	Pentagon	3:20		
2019	July 23	"Fantasystic (판타지스틱)"	Pentagon	3:17	Yan An was absent	
2020	February 25	"Dr. BeBe (Dr. 베베)"	Pentagon	3:16	Yan An was absent	
2020	October 21	"Daisy (데이지)"	Pentagon	3:13	Jinho was absent	
2021	March 24	"Do or Not"	Pentagon	3:13	Jinho was absent	

== Filmography ==
=== Drama ===
Year	Title	Member(s)	Network	Ref
2016	Spark	Yeo One, Hui, E'Dawn, Yuto, Wooseok	Naver TV	
2017	Hello, My Twenties! 2	Jinho, Shinwon, Yeo One, Yuto, Kino, Wooseok	JTBC	

=== Variety show ===
Year	Title	Network	Ref.
2016	Pentagon Maker	Mnet, Naver TV	
2020	Road to Kingdom	Mnet	

=== Reality shows ===
Year	Title		Season/Episode	Network	Notes
Year	English	Original	Season/Episode	Network	Notes
2016	PENTORY	펜토리	Ongoing	V Live, YouTube	October 12, 2016–present
2016	Pentagon's Textbook	펜타곤 교과서	5	V Live	Season 1 (5 episodes; October 12 – November 13, 2016); Season 2 (7 episodes; December 26, 2016 – January 31, 2017); Season 3 (2 episodes; June 24 & July 2, 2017); Season 4 (1 episode; September 13, 2017); Season 5 (3 episodes; November 2, 2018 – February 2, 2019)
2016	Pentagon's Private Life	펜타곤의 사생활	4	MBC, HeyoTV	December 7, 2017; June 30, 2017; December 14, 2017; January 4, 2018
2017	Pentagon's To Do List	펜타곤 To Do List	24	Naver V App	February 27, 2017 – January 4, 2018
2017	Pentagon's TNL (Thursday Night Live)	펜타곤의 TNL	4	Vlive	August 10 – 31, 2017
2018	Just Do It Yo!	저.두.요!	24	Vlive, YouTube	June 13, 2018 – October 2, 2019
2019	Hui's What To Wear Today	후이의 오늘 뭐 입지?	4	Youtube	June 14 – September 19, 2019
2019	Pentagon's TNL (Thursday Night Live)	펜타곤의 TNL	4	YouTube Live	June 20 - July 11, 2019
2019	Pentagon x Star Road		4	Vlive	"Sha La La" (6 episodes; April 22 – May 10, 2019) "Dr. Bebe" (10 episodes; February 18 – March 3, 2020) "Daisy" (8 episodes; October 22 – November 2, 2020) "Do or Not" (2 episodes; March 22 & 24, 2021)
2019	PRISM LOG		18	Vlive, YouTube	September 28, 2019 – January 21, 2020
2019	12 Hours Friday Live		8	YouTube Live	January 6 – 8, 2020
2020	Hongseok Exercising HongHongHong	홍석이가 운동한다 홍홍홍	Ongoing	Youtube	April 29–present
2020	Pentagon, What Should I Do Today?	펜타곤의 오.모.나	8	YouTube Live	May 23 – July 20, 2020
2020	Pentagon’s Variety Lab	펜타곤의 예능연구소	8	YouTube Live	August 17, 2020 – March 20, 2021
2020	Forest WE:TH Pentagon	포레스트 WE:TH 펜타곤	3	Cube TV	November 10 - 24, 2020

=== Commercial films ===
Year	Date	Title	Length	Notes	Ref
2016		Organic Ice Cream Bubble Cleanser		Commercial film for Econeko & Sausando	
2016	November 15	The 'Elite Fit PL' drama	1:13	Commercial film for Elite (엘리트) with I.O.I	
2016	November 23	The 'Elite Fit PL' drama	1:12	Commercial film for Elite (엘리트) with I.O.I	
2016	November 30	The 'Elite Fit PL' drama	1:08	Commercial film for Elite (엘리트) with I.O.I	
2017	September 27	D'LIVE	0:54	Commercial film for D'LIVE cable broadcast with Kim Yoo-jung	
2018	January 17	D'LIVE	0:30	Commercial film for D'LIVE cable broadcast	
2018	September 20	D'Live Plus UHD TV	0:31	Commercial film for D'LIVE cable broadcast with Jo Bo-ah	
2018	October 1	D'Live Plus UHD TV	0:25	Dance ver.	
2019	March 21	D'Live Plus UHD TV	0:44	Commercial film for D'LIVE cable broadcast	
2019	April 3	D'Live Plus UHD TV	0:30	Commercial film for D'LIVE cable broadcast	
2019	September 9	D'Live Plus UHD TV	0:30	Commercial film for D'LIVE cable broadcast	

== See also ==
- Pentagon discography
- List of songs recorded by Pentagon
