= Gorilla (EP) =

- Type A

EP by Pentagon
- Released: March 29, 2017
- Genre: J-pop
- Length: 20:00
- Language: Japanese
- Label: Cube Entertainment Japan

Pentagon chronology
Five Senses (2016)	Gorilla (2017)	Ceremony (2017)

Pentagon Japanese chronology
Gorilla (2017)	Violet (2018)

Alternative cover
- Type B

Singles from Gorilla
- 1. "Gorilla" Released: March 29, 2017

Gorilla is the first Japanese extended play from South Korean boy band Pentagon. It was released on March 29, 2017, by Cube Entertainment. The album contains six tracks, consisting of four Japanese-language versions of songs from their previous EPs Pentagon and Five Senses (including the title track "Gorilla") and two original songs.

== Track listing ==
Official track list
No.	Title	Length
1.	"Gorilla"	3:05
2.	"Can You Feel It"	3:18
3.	"Pretty Pretty"	3:08
4.	"You Are (Jinho, Hui, Hongseok, Shin Won, Yeo One, Yan an, Kino)"	3:41
5.	"Hikari (光)"	3:48
6.	"Get Down"	3:11
Total length:		20:00

== Charts ==
Chart (2017)	Peak position
Japanese Albums (Oricon)	5
