= Choi Jae Hyeok =

South Korean actor (born 2001)

- 최재혁
- Born: March 25, 2001 (age 25); South Korea
- Other name: Choi Jae Hyuk
- Occupations: Actor; singer
- Years active: 2022–present

Choi Jae Hyeok (Korean: 최재혁; born 25 March 2001) is a South Korean actor. He began his acting career in 2021 with the drama Welcome to the Sandbox, produced by CheezeFilm. In 2022, he appeared in the MBC television series From Now On, Showtime! and starred in CheezeFilm's Life After One Minute. He is best known for his leading role in the BL series Ball Boy Tactics (2025), distributed through TVING and iQIYI. He has also appeared in the stage play Shear Madness (2023).

== Early life and career ==
Choi began his acting career in 2022. He starred in the web series What Are We? and Life After One Minute, and made a guest appearance in the television drama From Now On, Showtime! In 2023, Choi appeared in the South Korean production of Shear Madness, portraying Jo Young-min.

In 2025, he was cast as Kwon Jeong-woo, one of the lead characters in the BL series Ball Boy Tactics, based on the work of Ji Seung-hyeon, opposite actor Yeom Min Hyeok. In June 2025, he and co-star Yeom Min Hyeok performed the original soundtrack single "Actually" for Ball Boy Tactics.

== Filmography ==
=== Television ===
Year	Title	Role	Notes	Platform
2021	Welcome to the Sandbox (샌드박스에 어서오세요)	Jae-hyuk	Recurring role	CheezeFilm
2022	What Are We?	Choi Jae Hyeok	Main role	CheezeFilm
2022	Bad Boy: Lost Eyes to Save a Friend (坏少年：为救朋友失去了眼)	Jae-hyeok	Main role	CheezeFilm
2022	Life After One Minute (1분 후의 세계)	Lee Se-gye	Main role	CheezeFilm
2022	From Now On, Showtime!	Bully	Guest role	MBC
2025	Double Play	Director	Recurring role	Shortime
2025	Ball Boy Tactics	Kwon Jeong-woo	Main role	GagaOOLala / iQIYI / TVING / Heavenly

=== Theatre ===
Year	Title	Role
2023	Shear Madness (쉬어매드니스)	Jo Young-min (조영민)

== Discography ==
=== Singles ===
Year	Title	Notes
2025	"Actually" (사실은 말야)	with Yeom Min Hyeok; OST for Ball Boy Tactics

=== Music videos ===
Year	Title	Artist	Notes
2025	"Wake Up"	XD	Promotional music video for the soundtrack of Ball Boy Tactics.
2025	"I'll Wait" (기다릴게)	UO (XD)	Promotional music video for the soundtrack of Ball Boy Tactics.
2025	"Two or We"	Waker	Promotional music video for the soundtrack of Ball Boy Tactics.
2025	"A Good Day" (좋은 날)	BXB	Promotional music video for the soundtrack of Ball Boy Tactics.

== Commercials ==
Year	Title	Notes
2024	Gogoro scooter (Taiwan)	Commercial
2025	Toss × National Police Agency anti-gambling campaign	Public service campaign

== Events and fan meetings ==
Year	Date	Event	Location	Notes
2025	24 August	Ball Boy Tactics First Fan Meeting	Space Brick, Seoul, South Korea	First official fan meeting of the main cast.
