= Ball Boy Tactics =

2025 South Korean television miniseries

- Promotional poster
- Hangul: 볼보이 택틱스
- RR: Bolboi taektikseu
- MR: Polboi t'aekt'iksŭ
- Genre: Romantic drama; Boys' Love; Sports; Youth
- Directed by: Kim Eun-hye
- Starring: Choi Jae-hyeok; Yeom Min-hyeok; Choi Rak-yeong; Gwak Geon-hui; Gi Hyeon-u
- Country of origin: South Korea
- Original language: Korean
- No. of seasons: 1
- No. of episodes: 8

Production
- Producer: Heavenly Pictures
- Production locations: Seoul, South Korea
- Running time: 30 minutes
- Production company: Heavenly Pictures

Original release
- Network: Heavenly; GagaOOLala; iQIYI
- Release: 5 June – 26 June 2025

Ball Boy Tactics (Korean: 볼보이 택틱스) is a 2025 South Korean romantic sports miniseries directed by Kim Eun-hye. The show consists of eight episodes and originally aired on Heavenly, with international distribution through GagaOOLala and iQIYI. It stars Choi Jae Hyeok and Yeom Min hyeok.

== Synopsis ==
Han Ji-won, a shy former Olympic gymnast, begins his university life trying to stay out of the spotlight. His routine changes when he meets Kwon Jung-woo, a popular basketball star on campus who hides a gentle side. Their attraction grows, challenged by personality differences, misunderstandings, and academic pressures. Between courts, classrooms, and intimate moments, they must decide whether their romance can endure.

== Cast ==
=== Main ===
- Choi Jae Hyeok as Kwon Jeong-u
- Yeom Min Hyeok as Han Ji-won

=== Supporting ===
- Choi Rak-yeong as Byeon Seung-jin
- Gwak Geon-hui as Yang Eun-o

=== Guest ===
- Ki Hyun-woo as Interviewer (episodes 5 and 8)

== Original soundtrack ==
Ball Boy Tactics soundtrack
No.	Title	Artist	Length
1.	"Wake Up"	XD
2.	"I'll Wait (기다릴게)"	YOOO (유오)
3.	"Two or We"	Waker
4.	"Actually (사실은 말야)"	Yeom Min-hyeok and Choi Jae Hyeok

== Production ==
The series was produced by Heavenly Pictures and filmed in Seoul. Each episode runs approximately 30 minutes and blends campus romance with sports and emotional growth themes.

== Reception ==
Ball Boy Tactics received positive feedback from viewers, especially for the chemistry between the leads and its sensitive portrayal of queer romance. The teaser was well received, highlighting romantic tension between the protagonists. A kiss scene between the leads also drew attention online, described as "very hot" by fans and critics. The series was listed among the most anticipated K-Dramas of June 2025.

== Accolades ==
=== Listicles ===
Year-end lists for Ball Boy Tactics
Critic/Publication	List	Rank	Ref.
Teen Vogue	13 Best BL Dramas of 2025	Included	
Queerty	10 Best BL Dramas of 2025	Included	
