= Nowadays =

Nowadays is an adverb meaning "at the present time; in the current era". It may also refer to:

- Nowadays (group), a South Korean boy band
  - Nowadays (single album), a 2024 debut single album by Nowadays
- "Nowadays" (song), a 2017 song by Lil Skies
- "Nowadays", a song by PnB Rock from TrapStar Turnt PopStar
