= Big Ocean =

South Korean boy group

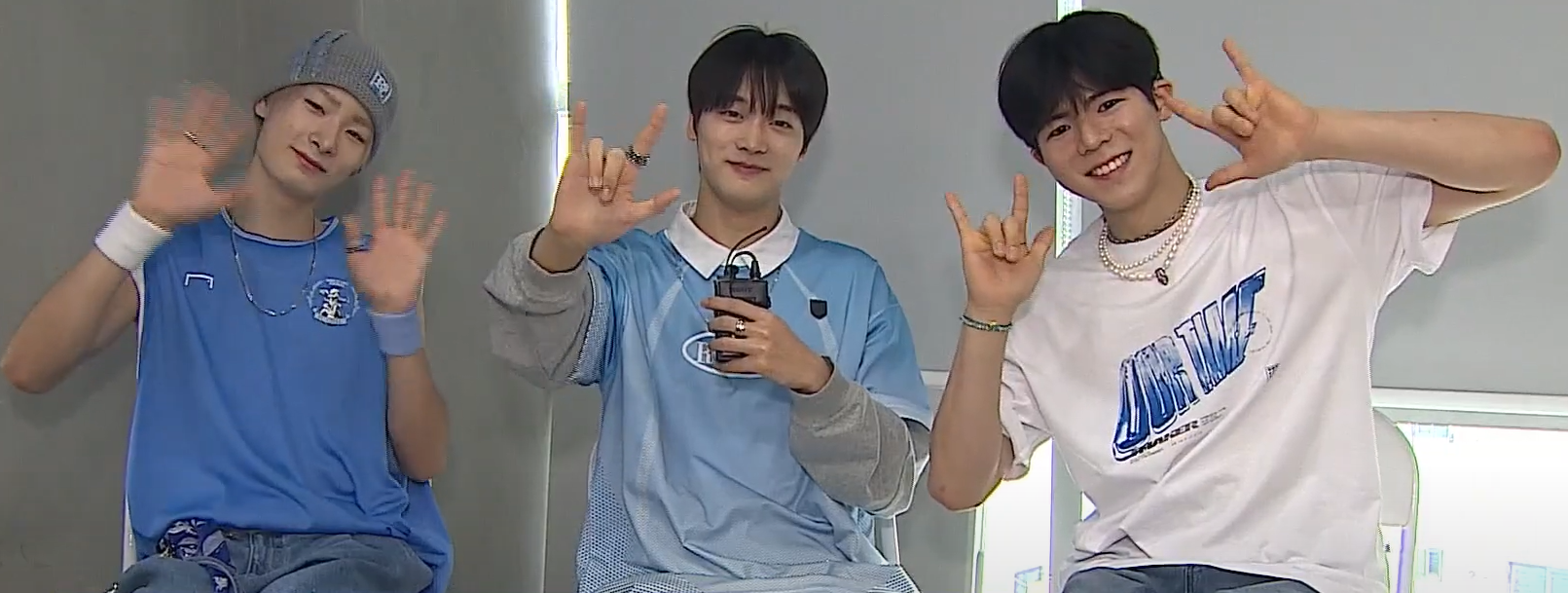
- Big Ocean in May 2024; From L–R: Kim Ji-seok, PJ, and Lee Chan-yeon

Background information
- Origin: Seoul, South Korea
- Genre: K-pop
- Years active: 2024–present
- Label: Parastar
- Spinoffs: Big Ocean JJ
- Members: Lee Chan-yeon (이찬연); PJ (피제이); Kim Ji-seok (김지석)
- Website: Official website

Big Ocean (Korean: 빅오션) is the first hard of hearing South Korean boy band, formed under Parastar Entertainment. The group consists of three members: Lee Chan-yeon, PJ, and Kim Ji-seok. They debuted on April 20, 2024, with the single "Glow", which coincided with the Day of Persons with Disabilities in South Korea. According to The New York Times, Big Ocean "has raised awareness of Deaf culture in Korea and the world."

Big Ocean released their first EP, Follow, on November 12, 2024, and it reached #41 on the Korean music sales charts. Their second EP, Underwater, was released on April 20, 2025, and it also reached #41. Big Ocean held a tour in 2025 in Brazil, Europe, and the United States.

Big Ocean has described their form of expression, which combines choreography, vocals, and sign language, as "free soul pop", focusing on "music that is comforting", according to PJ. Additionally, Chan-yeon has described Korean Sign Language as an integral part of their music, stating, "For us, KSL is not just an element — it’s the heart of our performance.”

Big Ocean has a social media following of 995,000 on Instagram and 696,000 on TikTok as of July 2025. In September 2024, Billboard named Big Ocean "K-Pop Rookie of the Month." In 2025, Forbes recognized Big Ocean on the 30 Under 30 Asia Entertainment & Sports List.

== History ==
=== Pre-debut ===
Parastar Entertainment, which manages Big Ocean, is the first Korean entertainment agency focused on artists with disabilities. The agency initially retained seven trainees as part of the S-Boyz project. Four of these members would exit the group prior to its debut as Big Ocean.

The three members of Big Ocean are Lee Chan-yeon (이찬연, born March 27, 1998), Park Hyun-jin (박현진, born October 24, 1999, and later known by the stage name PJ), and Kim Ji-seok (김지석, born March 5, 2003). Each member of the group has different levels of hearing loss. Ji-seok was born with a hearing impairment, PJ lost part of his hearing at the age of three due to a fever, and Chan-yeon experienced hearing loss at age eleven due to a fever. Chan-yeon underwent cochlear implant surgery on both ears, PJ has an implant in one ear and uses a hearing aid in the other, while Jiseok only wears hearing aids. Chan-yeon was not initially interested in music, but developed a passion for it as he listened to music as part of his rehabilitation process following his cochlear implant surgery. Ji-seok was unfamiliar with K-pop and choreography until BTS leader RM donated to the music program at Seoul Samsung School, a school for those with hearing-related disabilities where Ji-seok attended, in 2019.

Before debuting as idols, all three members held full-time jobs, which raised concerns among their acquaintances. Chan-yeon worked as an audiologist at Korea University Anam Hospital, PJ was a well-known TV personality and YouTuber who shared insights about his daily life while living with disabilities, and Ji-seok was a professional alpine skier and a member of the Seoul Disabled Ski Association. Chan-yeon was also a commercial model under Parastar Entertainment. Ji-seok had shared that he was often advised to "pursue physical or technical jobs due to his disability," advice which Ji-seok felt "was both a concern and a hurtful stereotype." PJ was planning to use his engineering degree to enter cybersecurity.

PJ was the first to be recruited to Parastar, in 2020. Ji-seok attended a fan meeting for PJ and was recruited there. Meanwhile, Lihoo, a renowned deaf actor under Parastar management, endorsed Chan-yeon to become a trainee. Haley Cha, CEO of Parastar Entertainment, which manages Big Ocean, has expressed that they "had many difficulties in developing this band." The trainees were not sure if they would succeed in the music industry, leading Cha to "help them visualize stardom" by editing their faces onto images of K-pop stars. As part of the trainee process, Chan-yeon learned sign language, which was not his native language.

In December 2023, the Korea Employment Promotion Agency for the Disabled published a public service announcement video featuring the members of Big Ocean prior to their debut.

=== Debut ===
Official logo

In March 2024, Parastar Entertainment, a management company representing artists with disabilities, announced the debut of Big Ocean, consisting of the trio who would perform using Korean Sign Language, American Sign Language, and International Sign. The group's name, Big Ocean, contains the meaning of "surprising the world" and the ambition to "have the potential of the sea and expand to the whole world like the sea".

According to their agency, the members recorded the songs in their own voices, similar to non-disabled singers. Some parts of the recording received assistance from artificial intelligence, which learned each member's voice data to help mix their voices properly. Ji-seok has described artificial intelligence as "another tool and technology we can adapt to art and music. It's not like [we’re] attacking the former or traditional music, but it's just something that adds to it." Additionally, the group has used smart watches that vibrate to the beat of the music and monitors that flash lights every eight beats to help them stay in rhythm while dancing.

The day before their debut, The Chosun Ilbo shared PJ's hopes that "Big Ocean will bridge the gap between disabled and non-disabled people, overcoming stereotypes and prejudices." On April 20, 2024, Big Ocean began its official activities upon performing on MBC's Show! Music Core and releasing their debut single "Glow." This first release was a remake of the 1998 song "Hope" by the first-generation idol group H.O.T.

In April 2024, fans voted for the name of the fandom, initially choosing the name "wave". As this fandom name was already in use by another K-pop group, fans voted again, this time between "pado" (the Korean word for "wave"), "fishie", and "salty". "Pado" received 70.6% of the vote. On April 24, PJ announced that the fandom would officially be known as "pado".

=== Post-debut activities ===
A few months after their debut, the group released their second single "Blow" on June 1, in collaboration with TikTok Korea. This single contained many English lyrics and was signed in American Sign Language.

In June 2024, Big Ocean collaborated with the World Health Organization to produce videos promoting public understanding of hearing impairment. In July 2024, the Big Ocean fandom donated to Gallaudet University, a Deaf and hard-of-hearing university in Washington, D.C., to honor the group's 100-day anniversary, in keeping with Korean traditions of celebrating a baby's survival after 100 days.

On August 11, 2024, Big Ocean released their third single "Slow" featuring Young K of Day6. The song's lyrics deliver a message of support to the Paris 2024 Olympics and Paralympics athletes who represented South Korea. On August 22, Big Ocean attended and performed at the 6th Newsis Korean Wave Expo. During the ceremony, the group was honored with the "Special Hallyu Award" as an icon of hope. In September, Big Ocean donated to Ji-seok's alma mater, Seoul Samsung School, fulfilling his dream to give back to students learning music. That same month, Big Ocean was featured as Billboard's "K-pop Rookie of the Month".

On November 12, 2024, Big Ocean collaborated with the New York City Police Department to surprise students at St. Joseph's School for the Deaf, performing their songs "Glow", "Blow", "Slow", and "Flow". Also on November 12, 2024, the group released their first EP Follow. The EP features their previously released singles and a new track "Flow", which produced by American producer Mark Batson. The National Institute for Deaf Youth of Paris and La Défense served as the filming location of the "Flow" music video. Big Ocean was invited to attend and perform at the Cool Out 2024 Festival in the Cayman Islands, where they showcased "Flow" for the first time.

=== Touring and second EP ===
On December 12, 2024, Parastar announced that the group would embark on their first solo concert on March 9, 2025, at the Toyota City Cultural Hall in Nagoya, Japan.

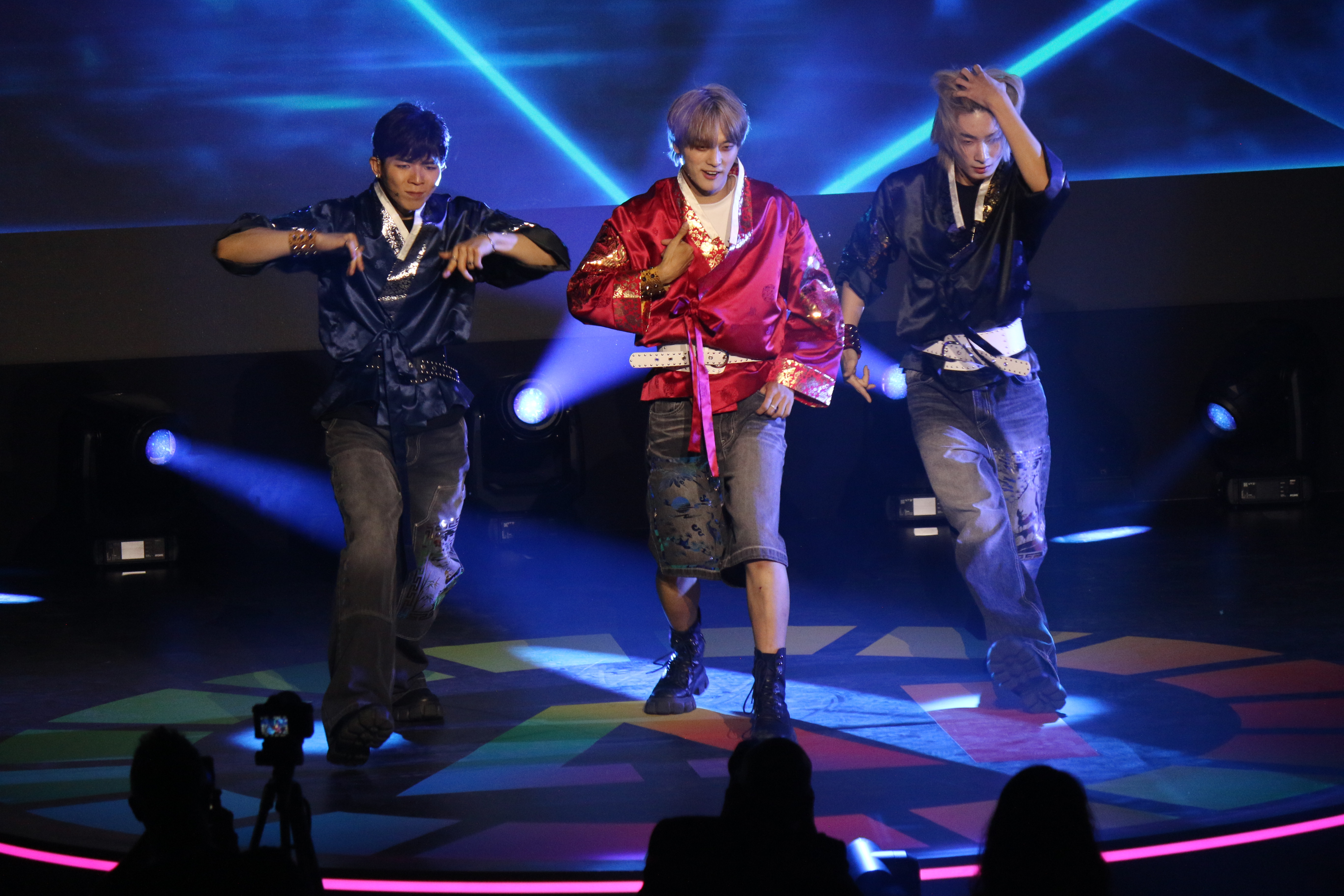
Big Ocean at the 2025 AI for Good Summit in Geneva

On April 2, 2025, Hyun-jin announced that he would be using the stage name PJ moving forward. This was announced through official content on episode 2 of their YouTube show "OceanView". On April 20, Big Ocean released their second EP, Underwater. This EP explores embracing one's identity and emotions, as part of a more mature concept that contrasts with the "younger concepts" of their earlier work. In late April, Big Ocean embarked on their first European tour, titled "Underwater" and spanning five cities.

On May 14, Big Ocean was recognized as one of the breakthrough artists in the Forbes 30 Under 30 Asia Entertainment & Sports List. The group is one of only two K-pop boy bands, alongside Stray Kids, featured in Forbes magazine for 2025. On July 3, Big Ocean performed at Anime Friends in São Paulo as the only K-pop act at the convention.

== Reception and impact ==
Jeonghwan Kim, president of the Seoul Association of the Deaf, stated of Big Ocean that "many Deaf youth see their presence onstage as a powerful form of representation." He added that "their work broadens the public’s perception of artistic expression beyond sound." Deaf author and journalist Liam O'Dell expressed how Big Ocean is counteracting the "frustrating misconception that Deaf and hard-of-hearing people can’t make or enjoy music."

Chan-yeon has shared that fans "who were overcoming cancer, surviving school bullying or healing from personal hardships" have taken inspiration from their work. Chan-yeon repeated a statement one fan shared with Big Ocean: "You’re proof that something that seems impossible can actually happen." Many fans have learned some signs from Big Ocean, who prepare tutorials for signing their songs.

== Members ==
During their trainee stage, the project group S-Boyz consisted of seven members. This was reduced to three members prior to their debut as Big Ocean.

PJ has expressed a desire to expand Big Ocean to additional members, with Ji-seok sharing that they are open to adding foreign members. The members all agree that future members should be hard of hearing, sharing that "our goal is to break barriers and push ourselves to the limit. Since we all have hearing disabilities, I think it makes sense that new members do, too.”

- Lee Chan-yeon (이찬연) – rapper
- PJ (피제이) [Park Hyun-jin (박현진)] – vocal
- Kim Ji-seok (김지석) – dancer

== Discography ==
=== Extended plays ===
List of extended plays, showing selected details, selected chart positions, and sales figures
Title	Details	Peak chart positions	Sales
Title	Details	KOR	Sales
Follow	Released: November 12, 2024; Labels: Parastar Entertainment, Kakao Entertainment; Formats: CD, digital download, streaming; Track listing: 1. "Flow"; 2. "Glow"; 3. "Blow"; 4. "Slow" (ft. Young K)	41	KOR: 1,603
Underwater	Released: April 20, 2025; Labels: Parastar Entertainment, Kakao Entertainment; Formats: CD, digital download, streaming; Track listing: 1. "Sinking"; 2. "Fade Out"; 3. "Attention"; 4. "End of Time"	41	KOR: 2,362

=== Single albums ===
List of single albums with selected details, chart positions and sales
Title	Details	Peak chart positions	Sales
Title	Details	KOR	Sales
Bucket Hat	Released: July 9, 2025; Label: Parastar Entertainment, Kakao Entertainment; Formats: Digital download, streaming; Track listing: 1. "Bucket Hat"	67	KOR: 943

=== Singles ===
List of singles, showing year released, and name of the album
Title	Year	Album
"Glow"	2024	Follow
"Blow"	2024	Follow
"Slow" (featuring Young K)	2024	Follow
"Flow"	2024	Follow
"Bright"	2025	Non-album single
"Attention"	2025	Underwater
"Red-dy Set Go"	2025	Red-dy Set Go
"One Man Army"	2026	The Greatest Battle
"Make It Up To You"	2026	Non-album singles
"Love Sign"	2026	Non-album singles
Big Ocean JJ (sub-unit)
"Bucket Hat"	2025	Non-album single

== Performances ==
First Underwater tour
Date	Town or city	Country	Venue	Notes
April 19, 2025	Lausanne	Switzerland	Beaulieu Lausanne	Performed at the Polymanga Lausanne convention
April 20, 2025	Lausanne	Switzerland	Beaulieu Lausanne	Performed at the Polymanga Lausanne convention
April 23, 2025	Milan	Italy	Legend Club	
April 24, 2025	London	England	The Underworld	
April 26, 2025	Paris	France	Café de la Danse	Sold out
April 27, 2025	Montpellier	France	Secret Place	

Second Underwater tour
Date	Town or city	Country	Venue	Notes
July 3, 2025	Sao Paulo	Brazil	Pavilhão de Exposições do Distrito Anhembi	Performed at the Anime Friends 2025 convention, as the only K-pop group
July 11, 2025	Warsaw	Poland	Klub Hybrydy	
July 12, 2025	Copenhagen	Denmark	Pumphuset	
July 14, 2025	Lille	France	Le Chapitô	The concert took place on Bastille Day
July 17, 2025	Athens	Greece	Arch Club	
July 19, 2025	Mainz	Germany	Old Post Warehouse	Performed at the K-Pop Revolution event
July 20, 2025	Mainz	Germany	Old Post Warehouse	Performed at the K-Pop Revolution event
July 27, 2025	Minneapolis, Minnesota	United States	Uptown Theater	
July 29, 2025	Las Vegas, Nevada	United States	House of Blues	
July 31, 2025	Kansas City, Missouri	United States	Gem Theater	
August 1, 2025	New York, New York	United States	SOB’s	
August 7, 2025	Falls Church, Virginia	United States	Crescendo Studios	
August 9, 2025	Raleigh, North Carolina	United States	AJ Fletcher Opera Theater at Martin Marietta Center for the Performing Arts	Sold out
August 10, 2025	Atlanta, Georgia	United States	Vinyl Center Stage	
October 10 -11, 2026	Houston, Texas	United States	Korean Festival Houston	

== Awards and nominations ==
=== Honors ===
Name of country or organization, year given, and name of honor
Country or organization	Year	Honor	Ref.
Newsis K-EXPO Cultural Awards (Note: Established in 2019 and co-sponsored by Korea's Ministry of Culture, Sports and Tourism, Ministry of Foreign Affairs, Korea Creative Content Agency, Seoul Metropolitan Council and the Seoul Tourism Organization, it awards cultural icons, businesses, and individuals who have contributed greatly to Hallyu, the Korean wave.)	2024	Special Hallyu Award	
Billboard	2024	Rookie of the Month	
The Korea Herald TikTok Awards 2025	2025	Social Impact Artist	

=== Listicles ===
Name of publisher, year listed, name of listicle, and placement
Publisher	Year	Listicle	Placement	Ref.
Forbes	2025	30 Under 30 Asia	Placed	
