= Whu Is Me: Complex =

- Digital cover

EP by Hui
- Released: January 16, 2024
- Genre: K-pop
- Length: 11:54
- Languages: Korean; English
- Label: Cube Entertainment

Singles from Whu Is Me: Complex
- 1. "Hmm Bop" Released: January 16, 2024

Whu Is Me: Complex is the debut extended play (EP) by South Korean singer Hui of the boy band Pentagon. It was released on January 16, 2024, by Cube Entertainment. The EP contains four tracks, including the lead single "Hmm Bop".

== Commercial performance ==
The EP sold 33,745 copies in South Korea and 1,082 in Japan in its first week. It peaked at number 4 on the Circle Album Chart and number 32 on the Japanese Oricon Albums Chart.

== Track listing ==
Whu Is Me: Complex track listing
No.	Title	Length
1.	"Hmm Bop" (흠뻑)	3:05
2.	"Melo" (with Park Hyeon-jin)	2:44
3.	"Cold Killer" (with Jinhyuk)	2:55
4.	"A Song from a Dream" (with Wooseok)	3:10
Total length:		11:54

== Charts ==
=== Weekly charts ===
Weekly chart performance for Whu Is Me: Complex
Chart (2024)	Peak position
Japanese Albums (Oricon)	32
South Korean Albums (Circle)	4

=== Monthly charts ===
Monthly chart performance for Whu Is Me: Complex
Chart (2024)	Peak position
South Korean Albums (Circle)	25
