= Do or Not =

Song by Pentagon

- Digital single cover

Single by Pentagon

from the album LOVE or TAKE
- Released: March 15, 2021
- Studio: Cube Studio
- Genre: K-pop; Pop rock
- Length: 3:08
- Label: Cube; Universal Music
- Songwriters: Lee Hoe-taek; Jung Woo-seok
- Producers: Hui; Wooseok; 네이슨 (NATHAN)

Pentagon singles chronology
"Eternal Flame" (2020)	"Do or Not" (2021)	"Feelin' Like" (2022)

Music video
- "DO or NOT" on YouTube

"Do or Not" (stylized as DO or NOT) is a song recorded by South Korean boy group Pentagon, released on March 15, 2021, by Cube Entertainment as the second track and lead single of the group's eleventh extended play, Love or Take written and produced by members Hui and Wooseok, alongside Nathan. The song is a refreshing Pentagon-style song that follows the footsteps of their other songs like "Shine", "Spring Snow" and "Daisy".

English and Chinese versions of the song were released together as a digital single on April 9, 2021. A Japanese version of "Do or Not" was released as the lead single of their EP of the same name on June 14, 2021.

== Composition and lyrics ==
The song is composed in the key of C major, 130 beats per minute with a running time of 3:08 minutes. "Do or Not" has a genre of pop rock that shows Pentagon's own unique musical and narrative style where 8 members become main characters of a romantic comic. The lyrics "Say you like it or not', 'Just make up your mind now' illustrate one's cautious inner side and genuine feelings of being desperate while waiting for other person's answer, but at the same time looking witty and nonchalant.

With the male lead of a TV show as the motif, 'Do or Not' portrays a chill attitude with phrases like just be with me or not', expressing Pentagon's very own simple and straightforward, 'just do it or not' kind of love in this complex and challenging society.

— Cube Entertainment on "Do or Not",

== Critical reception ==
Puah Ziwei of NME praised that the group's "sub-vocalists Shinwon, Yeo One and Yanan for stepping up" and "be satisfactory singers in their own right" as the group's "vocal powerhouses" Jinho and Hui were absent. She also describes the song "undoubtedly catchy", though she felt "the song starts off with a misplaced '60s-inspired doo-wop intro that sets an entirely wrong tone for the song. It soon takes an abrupt shift to an early-2000s pop rock sound, which seems like a precarious middle ground between the harder sound of the group’s recent releases (‘Daisy’ and ‘Dr. BeBe’) and the brighter pop sound of their earlier hits ("Shine" and "Naughty Boy"), and only then does the song finally find its footing, and concluded that "sing-along chorus is just enough to save the song".

== Commercial performance ==
The song debuted at number 60 on South Korea's Gaon Digital Chart on the chart issue dated March 14–20, 2021.

== Track listing ==
- Download and streaming – Love or Take
1. "Do or Not" – 3:08
- Digital single
1. "Do or Not (English Ver.)" – 3:08
2. "Do or Not (Chinese Ver.)" – 3:08
- Download and streaming – Do or Not
1. "Do or Not (Japanese Ver.)" – 3:08

== Credits and personnel ==
Credits are adapted from Cube Entertainment, NetEase Music, and Melon.

=== Song credits ===
- Pentagon – Vocals
  - Hui – Composer, songwriter, background vocal
  - Wooseok – Composer, songwriter
  - Yan An - Vocal guide (Chinese version)
- NATHAN – Composer, audio engineer, bass, drum, piano, synthesizer
- Gabriel Brandes – English translation (English version)
- Arys Chien – Chinese translation (Chinese version)
- Shoko Fujibayashi – Japanese translation (Japanese version)
- Soulman – Background vocal
- Kim Dong-min – Guitar
- Shin Jae-bin (Cube Studio) – Record engineering
- Choi Ye-ji (Cube Studio) – Record engineering
- Jeon Bu-yeon – Digital editing
- Mr. Cho (JoeLab) – Audio mixing
- Kwon Nam-woo (821 Sound mastering) – Audio mastering
- Jang Seung-ho (821 Sound mastering) – Assistant audio mastering

=== Visual credits ===
- Digipedi – music video director

== Promotion ==
To promote "Do or Not", Pentagon appeared and performed on several South Korean music programs including Mnet's M! Countdown, KBS's Music Bank, MBC's Show! Music Core, SBS's Inkigayo and SBS MTV's The Show.

== Music video ==
The music video for "Do or Not" was directed by Digipedi, and was uploaded to Pentagon's official YouTube channel on March 15, 2021. The music video garnered 1.3 million views, two days after its released, and exceeded 5 million views, four days later. The video sees the members of Pentagon all competing to try to win the love of the same girl. As they all try various adorable ways of impressing her like sharing the same headphones, dancing, and magic tricks, they come to realize that their friendships are what's most important. Emlyn Travis from BuzzFeed noted that the music video "not only the perfect fit for the song's upbeat melody and cheeky lyrics, but it also features the group's leader Hui who recently enlisted in the military last month, so it's especially sweet for fans."

== Accolades ==
Year-end lists
Critic/Publication	List	Rank	Ref.
Dazed	The best K-pop tracks of 2021	33	

== Charts ==
Weekly chart performance
Chart (2021)	Peak position
South Korea (Gaon Digital)	60
South Korea (Gaon Download)	5

Monthly chart performance
Chart (2021)	Peak position
South Korea (Gaon Digital)	152
South Korea (Gaon Download)	11

== Release history ==
Region	Date	Format	Version	Distributor
Various	March 15, 2021	Digital download; streaming	Korean	Cube; Kakao M; U-Cube
Various	April 9, 2021	Digital download; streaming	English	Cube; Kakao M; U-Cube
Various	April 9, 2021	Digital download; streaming	Chinese	Cube; Kakao M; U-Cube
Various	June 13, 2021	Digital download; streaming	Japanese	Cube; Universal Music Japan
