= Yeom Min Hyeok =

South Korean actor and singer (born 2004)

- 염민혁
- Born: February 11, 2004 (age 22); South Korea
- Other names: Yeom Min Hyuk; Yum Min-hyeok
- Occupations: Actor; singer
- Years active: 2025–present

Yeom Min Hyeok (Korean: 염민혁; born 11 February 2004) is a South Korean actor and singer. He is best known for his leading roles in television series such Ball Boy Tactics (2025) and Real Love (2025). In 2026, he appeared in the television series Honour, portraying Park Min-jae.

== Early life and career ==
Yeom began his acting career on stage, appearing in the play Aeryeon in 2024 and the theatrical production Drip Boy Scouts in 2025. In 2025, he starred as Min-hyeok in the web series Real Love. Later that year, he was cast as Han Ji-won, one of the lead characters in the BL drama Ball Boy Tactics, based on the work of Ji Seung-hyeon, opposite actor Choi Jae-hyeok. In 2026, he appeared in the drama series Honour, portraying Park Min-jae.

== Filmography ==
=== Television ===
Year	Title	Role	Notes	Platform
2024	Did You Tell Me the Password?	Male university student	Supporting role	Dauso Channel
2025	5 Minutes Before Adulthood	Male university student	Supporting role	Shortbox
2025	Real Love	Min-hyeok	Leading role	DeepFilm
2025	Ball Boy Tactics	Han Ji-won	Leading role	GagaOOLala / iQIYI / Heavenly
2026	Honour	Park Min-jae	Supporting role	Genie TV / ENA

=== Short films ===
Year	Title	Role
2024	Missing Call (부재중)	Min-hyeok
2024	Where Does Love Go? (사랑은 어디로 가나요)	Jae-seong
2024	Yeonju's Debut Story (연주의 입봉기)	Actor 4
2024	A Couple (부부)	Do-jun

=== Theatre ===
Year	Title	Role
2024	Aeryeon (애련)	Heo Chim
2025	Drip Boy Scouts (드립소년단)	Visual Dream Boy

== Discography ==
=== Singles ===
Year	Title	Notes/Ref.
2025	사실은 말야 (Actually...)	with Choi Jae-hyeok; OST for Ball Boy Tactics

=== Music videos ===
Year	Title	Artist	Notes/Ref.
2025	"Wake Up"	XD	Appearance in the promotional music video for the Ball Boy Tactics soundtrack.
2025	"Two or We"	Waker	Appearance in the promotional music video for the Ball Boy Tactics soundtrack.

== Events and fan meetings ==
Year	Date	Event	Venue	Notes/Ref.
2025	24 August	Ball Boy Tactics First Fan Meeting	Space Brick, Seoul	First official fan meeting of the main cast.
