= Primrose (group) =

South Korean female idol group

- Origin: Seoul, South Korea
- Genre: K-pop
- Years active: 2023–present
- Label: A.O Entertainment
- Members: Ruby; Nahyun; Rainie; Hayun
- Past members: Yeum

Primrose (Korean: 프림로즈; RR: Peurimrojeu; stylized in all caps) is a South Korean girl group under A.O Entertainment. Originally a duo, the group consists of four members: Ruby, Nahyun, Rainie, and Hayun. They made their debut on January 13, 2023, with the extended play (EP) Red Moon.

== History ==
=== Pre-debut ===
On November 8, 2022, A.O Entertainment revealed their new female duo name, Primrose, opening up social media accounts.

=== 2023–present: Debut with Red Moon & line-up changes ===
On January 3, it was announced that they would make their debut on January 13 with the EP Red Moon.

On March 23, A.O Entertainment issued an official statement disclosing the departure of Yeum from the duo, citing personal circumstances and health issues as the reasons behind her decision. Consequently, Primrose, originally a duo, would temporarily be a one-member solo act for the time being.

On May 3, A.O Entertainment officially announced the inclusion of former Hot Issue member Nahyun as a new member of Primrose. On May 16, former BugAboo member Rainie was introduced to the lineup. Hayun was the last member added to the group on June 22.

On July 26, a comeback was announced with the EP Laffy Taffy which was released on August 18.

On June 17, 2024, Primrose released the single album Revival with the title track Freja. On June 12, 2025, Primrose released the song "Cinema". On September 17, 2025, Primrose released "Love Your Flower." On June 24, 2026, the song "Cosmic" was released.

== Members ==
=== Current members ===
- Rainie (레이니)
- Nahyun (나현)
- Ruby (루비)
- Hayun (하윤)

=== Former members ===
- Yeum (예음)

== Discography ==
=== Extended plays ===
List of extended plays, showing selected details, selected chart positions, and sales figures
Title	Details	Peak chart positions	Sales
Title	Details	KOR	Sales
Red Moon	Released: January 13, 2023; Label: A.O Entertainment; Formats: CD, Digital download, streaming; Track listing: 1. "Intro _130°"; 2. "Primrose"; 3. "Comely"; 4. "Play"	—	
Laffy Taffy	Released: August 18, 2023; Label: A.O Entertainment; Formats: CD, digital download, streaming; Track listing: 1. "Laffy Taffy"; 2. "Awaken Light"; 3. "Fly Away"; 4. "Sippin' On"; 5. "Laffy Taffy (Eng ver.)"	65	KOR: 921
Steal Heart	Released: November 14, 2024; Label: A.O Entertainment; Formats: CD, digital download, streaming; Track listing: 1. "CASE#4"; 2. "Steal Heart"; 3. "Mission Escape"; 4. "Trick or Trigg"; 5. "Feel It"	58	KOR: 1,037

=== Single albums ===
Title	Details	Peak chart positions	Sales
Title	Details	KOR	Sales
Revival	Released: June 17, 2024; Label: A.O Entertainment; Formats: CD, digital download, streaming; Track listing: 1. "Freyja"	83	KOR: 1,200
Cosmic	Released: June 24, 2026; Label: A.O Entertainment; Formats: CD, digital download, streaming; Track listing: 1. "Cosmic"; 2. "Ring"	TBA	TBA

=== Music videos ===
Year	Title	Album	Director(s)	Ref.
2023	"Primrose"	Red Moon	Kim Jong Han	
2023	"Play"	Red Moon	Kim Jong Han	
2023	"Laffy Taffy"	Laffy Taffy	Kim Yeon Seok	
2024	"Freyja"	Revival	Soomin Hong (Geeek)	
2024	"Steal Heart"	Steal Heart	Yuri Lee	
2025	"Cinema"	Non-album single	MOVINGOUT STUDIO, LSMP, ASPIMAGE	
2025	"Love Your Flower"	Non-album single	Ethan Shin	
2026	"Cosmic"	Cosmic	Park Jihun (Movingout Studio)	
