= Korea University Medicine. =

Korea University Medicine
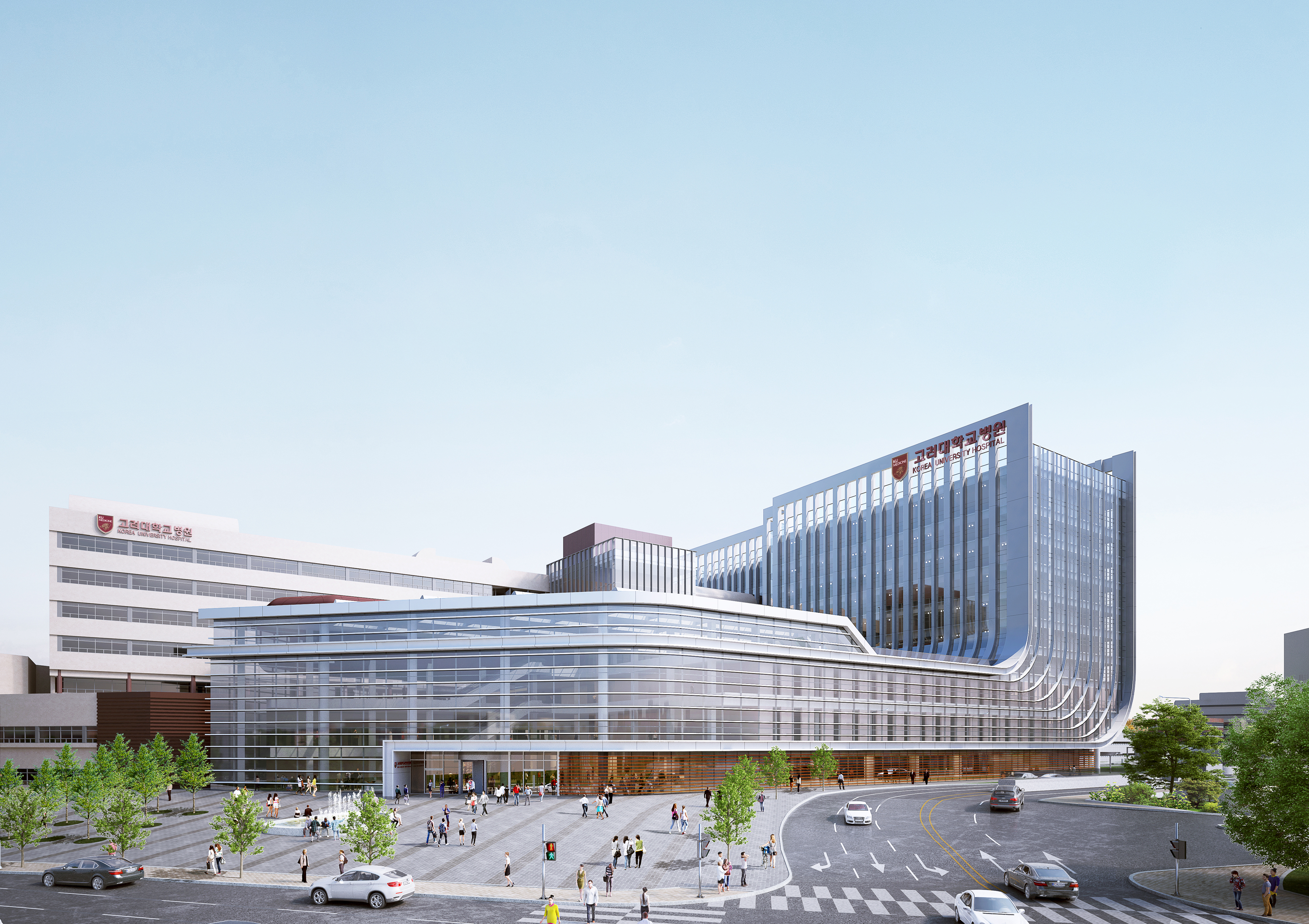

Geography
- Location: Seoul, South Korea
- Coordinates: 37.589382°N 127.025913°E

Organisation
- Care system: Private
- Type: Korea University Medicine
- Affiliated university: Korea University

Links
- Website: www.kumc.or.kr/kr/index.do
- Lists: Hospitals in South Korea

The Korea University Medicine (KU Medicine) is a group of hospitals, aas the College of Medicine and College of Nursing associated with Korea University in Seoul, South Korea. The group includes Anam Hospital, Guro Hospital, and Ansan Hospital. They were "the first medical educational institution funded independently with the nation's resources".

== History ==
KU Medicine was originally Kyoung-sung Women's Medical College, which opened on May 5, 1928. On October 1. 1983, it becameas Korea University Medicine.

Guro Hospital opened on September 15, 1983. On July 20, 2010, it was awarded the Grand Prize of the Korea Health Industry.

Ansan Hospital opened on April 15, 1985.

Anam Hospital opened on October 8, 1991. It is a 1000-bed medical facility. In 2009 the hospital was awarded the president's prize in the National Quality Management Competition.

== Research ==
"A 55-year-old male with liver cancer at the Korea University Medicine Anam Hospital was the first patient in Korea to receive treatment on the Halcyon™ system".

A 2022 study evaluated "the postoperative and survival outcomes of robotic-assisted colorectal cancer surgery in elderly patients"(Cuellar-Gomez et al., 2022), and the data used was with that "of all patients ≥75 years who underwent a robotic-assisted curative resection in Korea University Anam Hospital, Seoul, South Korea, between January 2007 and January 2021".

In 1976 the group discovered the hantavirus and developed the vaccine in 1988. In 1999 they developed transplantation of artificial hearts customized for Korea. In 2009 they originated domestic production of the swine flu vaccine. In 2016 KUM became the first medical college in Korea to satisfy the WFME evaluation standard.

== Education ==
The university consists of some 370 professors, and 800 students. The three departments of basic science, clinical science, and graduate school are within the college. Areas of specialization in basic science include: Parasitology, Neuroscience, Microbiology, Forensic Medicine, Pathology, Physiology, Biochemistry, and Molecular Biology, Pharmacology, Preventive Medicine, Biomedical Engineering, History of Medicine & Medical Humanities, Biostatistics, Anatomy, and Medical Education.

Areas of specialization in Clinical Science are Family Medicine, Anesthesiology, Urology, Plastic Surgery, Neurology, Ophthalmology, Surgery, Otorhinolaryngology, Rehabilitation Medicine, Orthopedics, Laboratory Medicine, Integrative Medicine, Nuclear Medicine, Internal Medicine, Radiation Oncology, Obstetrics and Gynecology, Pediatrics, Neurosurgery, Radiology, Emergency Medicine, clinical pharmacology, Psychiatry, Occupational and Environmental Medicine, Dentistry, Dermatology, and Thoracic Surgery.

Korea University College of Health Science is made up of the Schools of Biomedical Engineering, Biosystem and Biomedical Science, Health and Environmental Science, and Health Policy and Management. The Graduate School of Clinical Dentistry operates there.

College of Nursing
