= Genblue =

South Korean-Taiwanese girl group

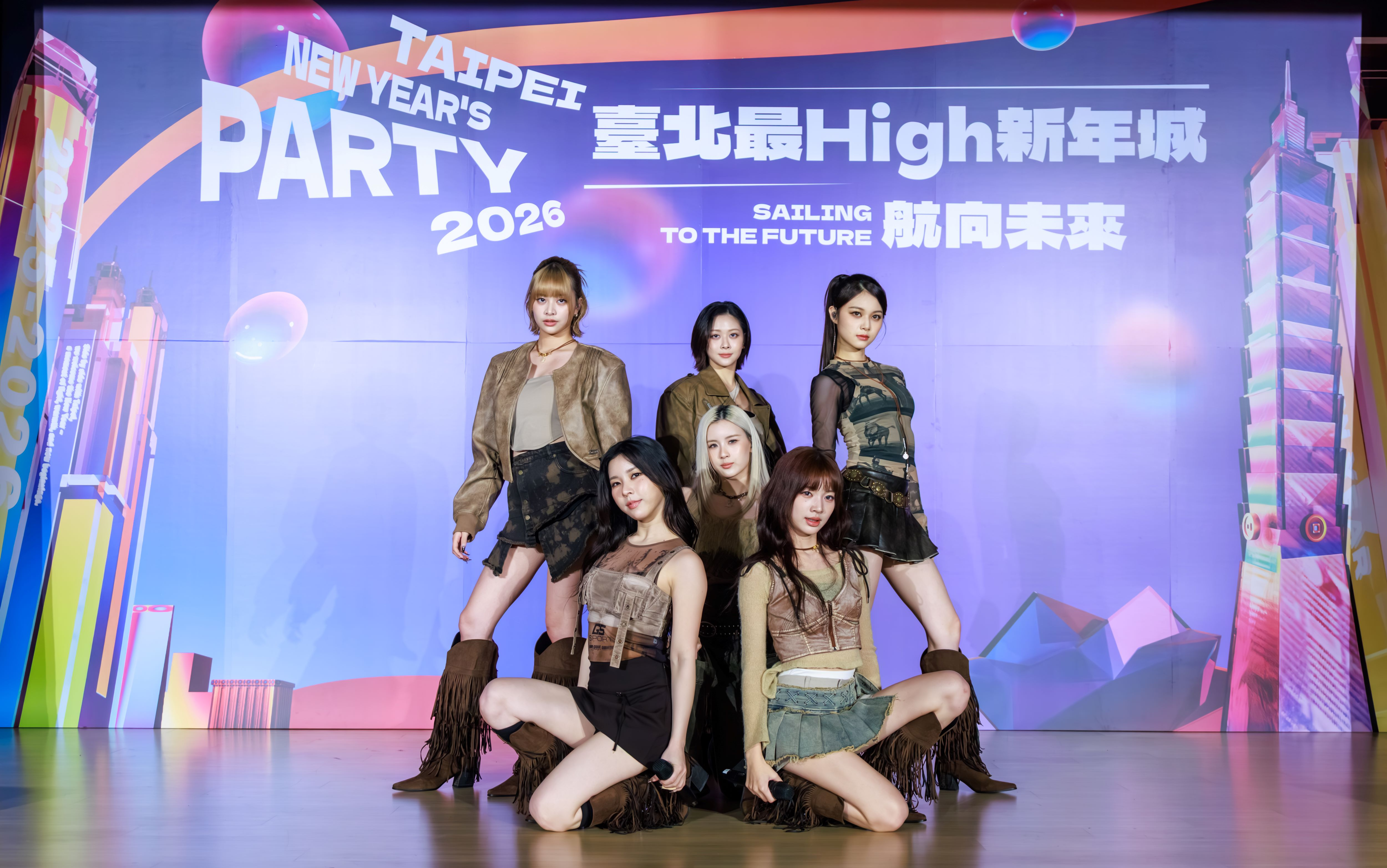
- Genblue in December 2025; Top, L–R: Nico, Xxin, Yuan; Bottom, L–R: Ayeon, Lili, Ayako

Background information
- Origin: Taiwan; South Korea
- Genres: K-pop; C-pop
- Years active: 2024–present
- Label: Ten Entertainment
- Members: Xxin; Ayeon; Yuan; Lili; Ayako; Nico
- Website: www.tenentcorp.com/pages/genblue

Genblue (Chinese: 幻藍小熊; pinyin: Huàn Lán Xiǎoxióng; Korean: 젠블루; RR: Jenbeullu) is a six-member South Korean-Taiwanese girl group formed by Ten Entertainment. The group is composed of six members: Xxin, Ayeon, Yuan, Lili, Akayo and Nico. They debuted in South Korea on September 2, 2024, with the single "Cococo". The group was originally formed as a nine-member group as part of the Next Girlz program released on Youtube, but three members were removed before their South Korean debut.

== Name ==
When participating in the Next Girlz program, the meaning of the group name was announced. The name comes from a portmanteau of the words "Generation" and "Blue", with the former representing Generation Z, and the latter representing infinite possibilities like the blue sky and the sea. Together, the name embodies the idea of courage with the intention of showing self-confidence and strong will. The official fandom name is Cookie.

== Members ==
- Xxin (씬) (Member of Taiwanese origin)
- Ayeon (아연) (Member of South Korean origin)
- Yuan (위엔) (Member of Taiwanese origin)
- Lili (리리) (Member of Taiwanese origin)
- Ayako (아야코) (Member of Japanese Taiwanese origin)
- Nico (니코) (Member of Taiwanese origin)

== Discography ==
=== Studio albums ===
- For You (2023) – pre-debut

=== Extended plays ===
List of extended plays, showing selected details, selected chart positions, and sales figures
Title	Details	Peak chart positions	Sales
Title	Details	KOR	Sales
Act Like That	Released: March 6, 2025; Label: Ten Entertainment; Formats: CD, digital download, streaming	21	KOR: 18,154
Mirror	Released: September 22, 2025; Label: Ten Entertainment; Formats: CD, digital download, streaming	16	KOR: 17,902

=== Singles ===
==== Korean singles ====
List of singles, with year released, selected chart positions, and album name
Title	Year	Peak chart positions	Album
Title	Year	KOR DL	Album
"Cococo"	2024	167	Non-album single
"Act Like That"	2025	—	Act Like That
"Badass"	2025	198	Mirror

==== Chinese singles ====
List of singles, with year released, and album name
Title	Year	Album
Pre-debut singles
"Checkmate"	2023	For You
"Trip"	2023	For You
"Slow Down"	2023	For You
"Aiyaya"	2023	For You
"Color Paper"	2023	For You
"Miss You 1000+"	2024	Non-album singles
"Listen to You"	2024	Non-album singles
"Exclusive Summer"	2024	Non-album singles
"Night Market Queen"	2026	Non-album singles
