= Five Senses (EP) =

EP by Pentagon
- Released: December 7, 2016
- Recorded: 2016
- Genre: K-pop
- Length: 16:11
- Language: Korean
- Label: Cube Entertainment; LOEN Entertainment
- Producer: Son Young-jin; Ferdy; Kang Dong-ha; Daniel Ceaesar; Ludwig Lindell; Jo Sung-ho

Pentagon chronology
Pentagon (2016)	Five Senses (2016)	Gorilla (2017)

Pentagon Korean chronology
Pentagon (2016)	Five Senses (2016)	Ceremony (2017)

Singles from Five Senses
- 1. "Can You Feel It" Released: December 7, 2016

Music videos
- "감이 오지(Can You Feel It)" on YouTube
- "예쁨(Pretty Pretty)" on YouTube

Five Senses is the second extended play from South Korean boy band Pentagon. It was released on December 7, 2016, by Cube Entertainment. The album consists of five tracks, including the title track, "Can You Feel It".

== Background and release ==
On November 24, 2016, Pentagon announced the title and release date of their second mini-album through their official SNS accounts. The album was highlighted in particular due to the short time between its release and the group's first mini-album Pentagon, which was released less than two months prior. The next day, they released a time schedule for the upcoming comeback. Group photos were posted on November 28 and 29. The tracklist was published on the November 30, followed by an audio snippet of the EP on December 2. On December 3, they released a teaser for the title track "Can You Feel It" with a video of the members participating in the "Mannequin Challenge". The video, which was not included in the comeback schedule, showcases the members motionless while displaying snippets of the choreography. They released a music video teaser for "Can You Feel It" on December 5. The group first unveiled the song at their first solo concert "Tentastic Vol. 1 - Love" on December 6. The same day, a media showcase was held to commemorate the release of the mini-album at Yes24 Live Hall in Gwangjin-gu, Seoul. The video was released on December 7 alongside the album.

On January 18, 2017, a music video teaser for "Pretty Pretty" was released. The music video, featuring I.O.I's Chungha, was released on January 22.

== Track listing ==
Official track list
No.	Title	Lyrics	Music	Arrangement	Length
1.	"Can You Feel It" (감이 오지)	Son Young-jin; Ferdy	Son Young-jin; Ferdy	Son Young-jin; Ferdy	3:16
2.	"Engine"	Ferdy; Kang Dong-ha; Wooseok; Yuto	Ferdy; Kang Dong-ha	Ferdy; Kang Dong-ha	3:14
3.	"Pretty Pretty" (예쁨)	Seo Ji-eum	Daniel Ceaesar; Ludwig Lindell	Daniel Ceaesar; Ludwig Lindell	3:09
4.	"Lose Yourself" (풀러)	Son Young-jin; Jo Sung-ho; Ferdy; E'Dawn	Son Young-jin; Jo Sung-ho; Ferdy	Son Young-jin; Jo Sung-ho; Ferdy	3:16
5.	"Stay Crazy" (정신 못 차려도 돼)	Ferdy; Kang Dong-ha; E'Dawn	Ferdy; Kang Dong-ha	Ferdy; Kang Dong-ha	3:16
Total length:					16:11

== Charts ==
Chart (2019)	Peak position
South Korean Albums (Gaon)	5

== Certifications and sales ==
Region	Certification	Certified units/sales
South Korea	—	22,589
