= Seola (singer) =

South Korean singer and actress

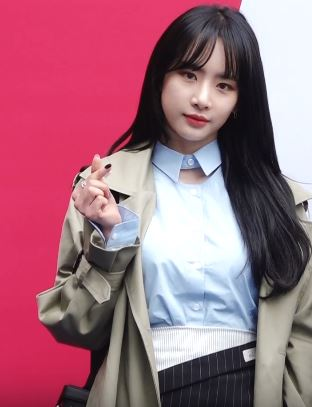
- Seola in March 2019
- Born: Kim Hyun-jung; Hapjeong-dong, Mapo District, Seoul, South Korea
- Occupations: Singer; actress
- Years active: 2016–present
- Musical career
- Genres: K-pop
- Instrument: Vocals
- Labels: Starship; Yuehua
- Member of: WJSN; WJSN The Black
- Formerly of: Y-Teen; WJMK

Korean name
- Hangul: 김현정
- Hanja: 金炫廷
- RR: Gim Hyeonjeong
- MR: Kim Hyŏnjŏng

Stage name
- Hangul: 설아
- Hanja: 雪娥
- RR: Seola
- MR: Sŏra

Kim Hyun-jung (Korean: 김현정), known professionally as Seola (Korean: 설아; stylized as SeolA), is a South Korean singer and actress, best known as a member of the South Korean girl group WJSN.

== Career ==
=== 2016–2017: Debut with WJSN, and acting debut ===
Seola was revealed to be a member of WJSN and its "Sweet Unit" on December 24, 2015. WJSN debuted on February 25, 2016, with the release of their debut EP Would You Like?, including the lead singles "Mo Mo Mo" and "Catch Me".

In August 2016, Seola, alongside group members Exy, Soobin, Eunseo, Cheng Xiao, Yeoreum, and Dayoung collaborated with label mates Monsta X to form the unit "Y-Teen". Y-teen was a project unit group that promoted as CF models for KT's phone fare service and would release EPs, music videos, and various entertainment content.

In November 2017, Seola made her acting debut when she was cast for a supporting role in Naver TV's short web-drama Good Morning Double-Decker Bus.

=== 2018–present: WJMK, The Black and solo debut ===
On May 2, 2018, Starship Entertainment and Fantagio collaborated to form a special four-member unit named WJMK, consisting of members of their respective girl groups WJSN and Weki Meki. The group is composed of four members: Yoojung, Doyeon, Seola, and Luda. On June 1, 2018, they released the single "Strong" along with a music video.

On June 14, 2018, Seola released "Love Virus" for the soundtrack of What's Wrong with Secretary Kim alongside labelmate Kihyun. In June 2019, Seola starred in Naver TV's web drama In-Out Sider as Jung So-min, an icon of students' first love, who has everything from appearance, personality, and studies to missing. In August 2020, Seola starred in the Netflix original series Goedam. In April 2021, WJSN's second sub-unit named The Black was formed with Seola and fellow members Exy, Bona, and Eunseo. In June 2021, Seola was cast as the female lead in web drama Love in Black Hole as the character Eunha, who finds a white hole in her room and searches for traces of the person she likes. In January 2022, Seola released "100 percent" for the soundtrack of Best Mistake 3 with groupmate Yeonjung. In April 2023, Seola was selected as a DJ on KBS Radio's Station Z.

On January 23, 2024, Seola made her solo debut with the single album Inside Out. In September 2026, Seola parted ways with Starship Entertainment following the expiration of her exclusive contract.

== Discography ==
=== Single albums ===
List of single albums with selected details, chart positions and sales
Title	Details	Peak chart positions	Sales
Title	Details	KOR	Sales
Inside Out	Released: January 23, 2024; Label: Starship Entertainment; Formats: CD, digital download, streaming	8	KOR: 39,342

=== Singles ===
List of singles, showing year released, selected chart positions, and name of the album
Title	Year	Peak chart position	Album
Title	Year	KOR DL	Album
"Flower"	2023	160	Non-album singles
"Teddy Bear"	2023	58	Non-album singles
"Without U"	2024	28	Inside Out

=== Soundtrack appearances ===
List of soundtrack appearances, showing year released, selected chart positions, and name of the album
Title	Year	Peak chart position	Album
Title	Year	KOR DL	Album
"Love Virus" (with Kihyun)	2018	67	What's Wrong with Secretary Kim OST
"See Saw" (with Park Kyung)	2020	—	Backstreet Rookie OST
"At the End of the Day"	2021	129	Growing Season OST
"Happy Ending is Mine"	2021	158	Love in Black Hole OST
"100 Percent" (with Yeonjung)	2022	132	Best Mistake 3 OST Part 1
"Lover"	2022	137	Summer Strike OST Part 8
"By My Side"	2023	—	The Beloved Little Princess OST
"Stay" (with Cravity's Taeyoung)	2023	189	Man and Woman OST Part 1
"—" denotes releases that did not chart or were not released in that region.

=== Composition credits ===
All song credits are adapted from the Korea Music Copyright Association's database unless otherwise stated.

Year	Artist	Song	Album	Lyrics		Music					
Year	Artist	Song	Album	Credited	With	Credited	With				
Year	Artist	Song	Album	2020	WJSN	"Our Garden"	Neverland	Yes	Jinli (Full8loom), Exy	Yes	Glory Face (Full8loom), Jinli (Full8loom), HARRY (Full8loom)
Year	Artist	Song	Album	2021	WJSN	"New Me"	Unnatural	Yes	Jinli (Full8loom), Exy	Yes	Glory Face (Full8loom), Jinli (Full8loom), HARRY (Full8loom)
Year	Artist	Song	Album	2024	Seola	"NO GIRL"	Inside Out	Yes	Brother Su	Yes	Brother Su
"Let’s Talk (Loneliness)"	Yes	Jinli (Full8loom), Youra	Yes	2024	Seola	Jinli (Full8loom), Glory Face (Full8loom)	Inside Out				
"Without U"	Yes	Jinli (Full8loom)	Yes	2024	Seola	woojin (Full8loom), Glory Face (Full8loom)	Inside Out				

== Videography ==
=== Music videos ===
Year	Title	Director(s)	Duration	Ref.
2024	"Without U"	Studio GA.ZE SOZE	3:14	

== Filmography ==
=== Film ===
Year	Title	Role	Notes	Ref.
2022	Urban Myths	Ji-hye	Segment: "The Closet"	

=== Television series ===
Year	Title	Role	Notes	Ref.
2017	Chicago Typewriter	Herself	Cameo (Episode 3)	

=== Web series ===
Year	Title	Role	Ref.
2017	Good Morning Double-Decker Bus	Shi Young	
2019	In-Out Sider	Somin	
2020	Goedam	Min Young	
2021	Love in Black Hole	Eunha	

=== Television shows ===
Year	Title	Role	Notes	Ref.
2018	King of Mask Singer	Contestant	Using stage name "Observatory" (Episode 173–174)	
