= Planet Nine: Isotropy =

- Digital cover

EP by Onewe
- Released: April 17, 2024
- Recorded: 2024
- Studio: RBW, Giuk
- Genre: Rock
- Length: 21:47
- Language: Korean
- Label: RBW; Kakao

Onewe chronology
XOXO (2023)	Planet Nine: Isotropy (2024)	Off Road (2024)

Singles from Planet Nine: Isotropy
- 1. "Beautiful Ashes" Released: April 17, 2024

Music videos
- "Beautiful Ashes" on YouTube

Planet Nine: Isotropy is the third extended play by the South Korean band Onewe. It was released by RBW and distributed by Kakao Entertainment on April 17, 2024. The EP is the third in the band's Planet Nine series, following their EPs Planet Nine: Alter Ego and Planet Nine : Voyager. It consists of six songs, written by each of the five members of the band, including the lead single "Beautiful Ashes".

== Background and release ==
On January 11, 2024, the band's leader Yonghoon completed his mandatory military service, followed by their guitarist Kanghyun who was discharged on February 1, returning the band to their complete quintet form.

On March 27, 2024, Onewe released a teaser and schedule plan announcing they will be returning with their third EP Planet Nine: Isotropy on April 17. To commemorate the release of the album, they would also be holding their O! New E!volution III concert on May 4 and 5.

On March 30, the full track list was revealed with a total of six tracks, written and composed by each of the five members of Onewe, including the lead single "Beautiful Ashes".

== Track listing ==
Planet Nine: Isotropy track listing
No.	Title	Lyrics	Music	Arrangement	Length
1.	"Beautiful Ashes" (추억의 소각장)	Yonghoon, Giuk	Jeon Da-woon (RBW), Yonghoon, Giuk	Jeon Da-woon (RBW), Kanghyun, Harin	3:32
2.	"Shoot It Out"	Kanghyun, Giuk	Kanghyun, CocoDubuPapa (RBW)	CocoDubuPapa (RBW), Kanghyun	3:05
3.	"Meteor Shower" (한여름 밤 유성우)	Giuk	Giuk, Gray Dot	Giuk, Gray Dot	3:57
4.	"Count the Stars" (별 세는 너)	Yonghoon, Giuk	Yonghoon, Jeon Da-woon (RBW)	Jeon Da-woon (RBW), Yonghoon	3:34
5.	"Kiss in the Rain"	Dongmyeong, Giuk	Jeon Da-woon (RBW), Dongmyeong, CocoDubuPapa (RBW), Giuk	Jeon Da-woon (RBW), CocoDubuPapa (RBW)	4:19
6.	"Pleasant" (다시 만나서 반가워)	Harin, Yonghoon, Giuk	Harin, Jeon Da-woon (RBW)	Jeon Da-woon, Harin, Kanghyun	3:20
Total length:					21:47

== Charts ==
Chart performance for Planet Nine: Isotropy
Chart (2024)	Peak position
South Korean Albums (Circle)	12
