= Inside Out (single album) =

- Digital cover

Single album by Seola
- Released: January 23, 2024
- Genre: K-pop
- Length: 8:31
- Language: Korean
- Label: Starship

Singles from Inside Out
- 1. "Without U" Released: January 23, 2024

Inside Out is the debut single album by South Korean singer Seola. It was released by Starship Entertainment on January 23, 2024.

== Background and release ==
On December 1, 2023, Starship announced that Seola will be making her solo debut in January 2024, making her the first Korean member of WJSN to do so. On December 28, the official logo motion for Seola was revealed. A day later, Seola's debut was announced to be on January 23, 2024, with the single album Inside Out through an image teaser. On January 3, 2024, the promotion schedule was released. A day later, the track listing was released, with "Without U" announced as the lead single. Two mood teaser films and their accompanying promotional photos were released on January 7 and 8. On January 19, a preview for the album was released, followed by a teaser for the music video for the lead track "Without U" two days later. The album was released on January 23, along with the music video for "Without U".

== Composition ==
Inside Out consists of three tracks. The first track and lead single "Without U" was described as a "band pop song with a soulful acoustic sound and powerful vocals". Discussing about the song's concept, Seola said that it would be "refreshing to see (her) perform alongside a live band" rather than dancing like she does with her group, but she assures that she would like to incorporate back dancing to her performance in her future release. She continues by saying that having just a vocal performance allows her to "show the color of (her) vocals and focus on the musicality in (her) solo album".

== Track listing ==
Track listing for Inside Out
No.	Title	Lyrics	Music	Arrangement	Length
1.	"Without U"	Jinli (Full8loom); Seola	Gloryface (Full8loom); Jinli (Full8loom); Woojin (Full8loom)	Gloryface (Full8loom); Woojin (Full8loom)	3:12
2.	"Let's Talk (Loneliness)"	Jinli (Full8loom); Seola; Youra (Full8loom)	Gloryface (Full8loom); Jinli (Full8loom); Seola	Gloryface (Full8loom)	2:44
3.	"No Girl"	Seola; Brother Su	Seola; Brother Su	Brother Su	2:34
Total length:					8:31

== Charts ==
=== Weekly charts ===
Weekly chart performance for Inside Out
Chart (2024)	Peak position
South Korean Albums (Circle)	8

=== Monthly charts ===
Monthly chart performance for Inside Out
Chart (2024)	Position
South Korean Albums (Circle)	34
