= Pentagon (EP) =

EP by Pentagon
- Released: October 10, 2016
- Genre: K-pop
- Length: 23:00
- Language: Korean
- Label: Cube Entertainment; LOEN Entertainment
- Producer: Ali Zackowski; Big Sancho; Delly Boi; DK; E'Dawn; Ferdy; Gavin Jones; Harry Sommerdahl; Hui; Hyuk Shin; Jayrah Gibson; Jo Sung-ho; Re:one; Seo Jae-woo

Pentagon chronology
Pentagon (2016)	Five Senses (2016)

Singles from Pentagon
- 1. "Gorilla" Released: October 10, 2016

Music video
- "Gorilla"" on YouTube

Pentagon is the first extended play from South Korean boy band Pentagon. It was released on October 10, 2016, by Cube Entertainment. The album consists of seven tracks, including the title track, "Gorilla".

== Commercial performance ==
The EP sold 19,772+ copies in South Korea. It peaked at number 7 on the Korean Gaon Chart.

== Track listing ==
Official track list
No.	Title	Lyrics	Music	Arrangement	Length
1.	"Wake Up" (intro)	Big Sancho; E'Dawn	Seo Jae-woo	Seo Jae-woo	1:26
2.	"Pentagon"	Big Sancho; Jo Sung-ho	Big Sancho; Jo Sung-ho	Big Sancho; Jo Sung-ho	3:26
3.	"Gorilla"	Seo Ji-eum	Gavin Jones; Ali Zackowski; Harry Sommerdahl	Gavin Jones; Ali Zackowski; Harry Sommerdahl	3:05
4.	"Lukewarm" (미지근해)	Kang Dong-ha; E'Dawn; Wooseok	Ferdy	Ferdy	3:29
5.	"Smile"	Mafly; Keyfly	Hyuk Shin; Delly Boi; Re:one; Jayrah Gibson; DK	Delly Boi; Re:one	3:34
6.	"Organic Song" (귀 좀 막아줘) (sung by E'Dawn, Yuto, Wooseok, Hui)	E'Dawn; Wooseok	E'Dawn; Hui	Big Sancho	3:40
7.	"You Are" (sung by Jinho, Hui, Hongseok, Shinwon, Yeo One, Yan An, Kino)	Hui	Hui	Big Sancho	3:41
Total length:					23:00

== Charts ==
Chart (2016)	Peak position
South Korean Albums (Gaon)	7
