= Waker =

South Korean boy band

- Origin: Seoul, South Korea
- Genre: K-pop
- Years active: 2024–present
- Label: Howling
- Members: Kohyeon; Kwon Hyeop; Ijun; Leo; Saebyeol; Sebum
- Website: howling.co.kr/WAKER

Waker (Korean: 웨이커; stylized in all caps) is a South Korean boy band formed and managed by Howling Entertainment. The group consists of six members: Kohyeon, Kwon Hyeop, Ijun, Leo, Saebyeol, and Sebum. They debuted on January 8, 2024, with the extended play (EP) Mission of School.

== Name ==
The group's name, Waker, which means "one who awakens", contains the ambition to stir the hearts of fans through their music.

== History ==
=== Introduction and pre-debut activities ===
On December 1, Howling Entertainment announced the debut date of Waker which would be on January 8, 2024. In addition, they are the first boy group to debut in 2024. On the same day, the group released their pre-release single "Dash" as part of their upcoming debut EP. On December 7, Waker announced Mission of School as the title of their debut EP along with the scheduler.

Prior to their debut, four of the members had already been active in the entertainment industry, Kohyeon performed in various fields such as solo activities, musicals and web dramas, Sebum participated in Cap-Teen (2020–2021) and Stars Awakening (2022), Kwon Hyeop was a contestant in the season 2 of Produce 101 (2017), and Saebyeol was a contestant in Produce X 101 (2019).

=== 2024–present: Debut with Mission of School and Sweet Tape ===
On January 8, Waker officially debut with their first EP Mission of School and its single "Atlantis" along with its music video.

On June 18, Waker released a "Coming Soon" poster on their social media accounts with a date set on July 16 prompting a comeback. Two days later, the group announced Sweet Tape as the title of their second EP along with the scheduler.

== Members ==
- Kohyeon (고현) – leader
- Kwon Hyeop (권협)
- Ijun (이준)
- Leo (리오) – vocal, rap, dance
- Saebyeol (새별) – vocal
- Sebum (세범) – dance

== Discography ==
=== Extended plays ===
List of extended plays, showing selected details, selected chart positions and sales figures
| Title | Details | Peak chart positions | Sales |
| Title | Details | KOR | Sales |
|---|---|---|---|
| Mission of School | Released: January 8, 2024; Label: Howling Entertainment; Formats: CD, digital download, streaming; Track listing: 1. "Intro: Find the Light Inside"; 2. "Dash"; 3. "Atlantis"; 4. "Daydream"; 5. "Start With Me" (다신 널 이따위로 놓치고 싶진 않아); 6. "Forever" (그 시간에 멈춰있을게); 7. "Spirit"; 8. "Paradise"; 9. "Atlantis (Eng ver.)" 10. Dreaming Talk: Day 1" | 61 | KOR: 3,426 |
| Sweet Tape | Released: July 16, 2024; Label: Howling Entertainment; Formats: CD, digital download, streaming; Track listing: 1. "Intro: Where Do We Go"; 2. "Vanilla Choco Shake"; 3. "Call My Name"; 4. "Dolce"; 5. "Don't Worry"; 6. "To.X" (꿈에서 날 만나); 7. "Rest" (쉬어); 8. "Lollipop"; 9. "Dreaming Talk: Day 2" | 24 | KOR: 13,216 |
| In Elixir: Spellbound | Released: January 8, 2026; Label: Howling Entertainment; Formats: CD, digital download, streaming | 10 | KOR: 11,522 |

=== Singles ===
List of singles, showing year released and name of the album
| Title | Year | Album |
|---|---|---|
| "Dash" | 2023 | Mission of School |
| "Atlantis" | 2024 | Mission of School |
| "Vanilla Choco Shake" | 2024 | Sweet Tape |
| "Like That" | 2026 | In Elixir: Spellbound |
