= Nowz =

South Korean boy band

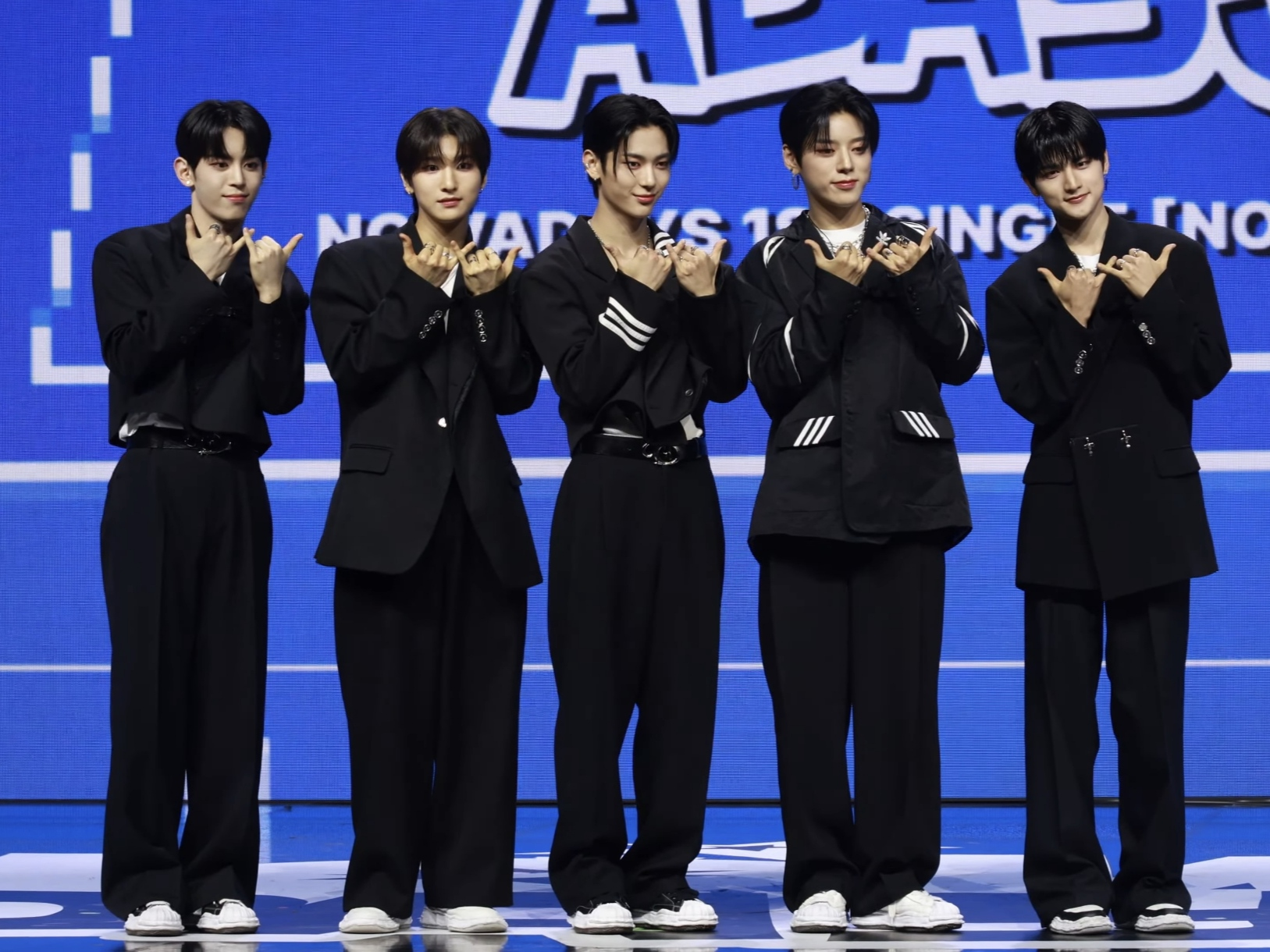
- Nowz in April 2024; From L-R: Hyeonbin, Yeonwoo, Siyun, Jinhyuk, and Yoon

Background information
- Also known as: Nowadays (2024–2025)
- Origin: Seoul, South Korea
- Genre: K-pop
- Years active: 2024–present
- Label: Cube
- Members: Hyeonbin; Yoon; Yeonwoo; Jinhyuk; Siyun
- Website: cubeent.co.kr/cube_nowadays

Nowz (Korean: 나우즈; RR: Naujeu; stylized in all caps; formerly known as Nowadays) is a South Korean boy band formed by Cube Entertainment in 2023. The group consists of five members: Hyeonbin, Yoon, Yeonwoo, Jinhyuk, and Siyun. They debuted on April 2, 2024, with the eponymous single album Nowadays.

== Name ==
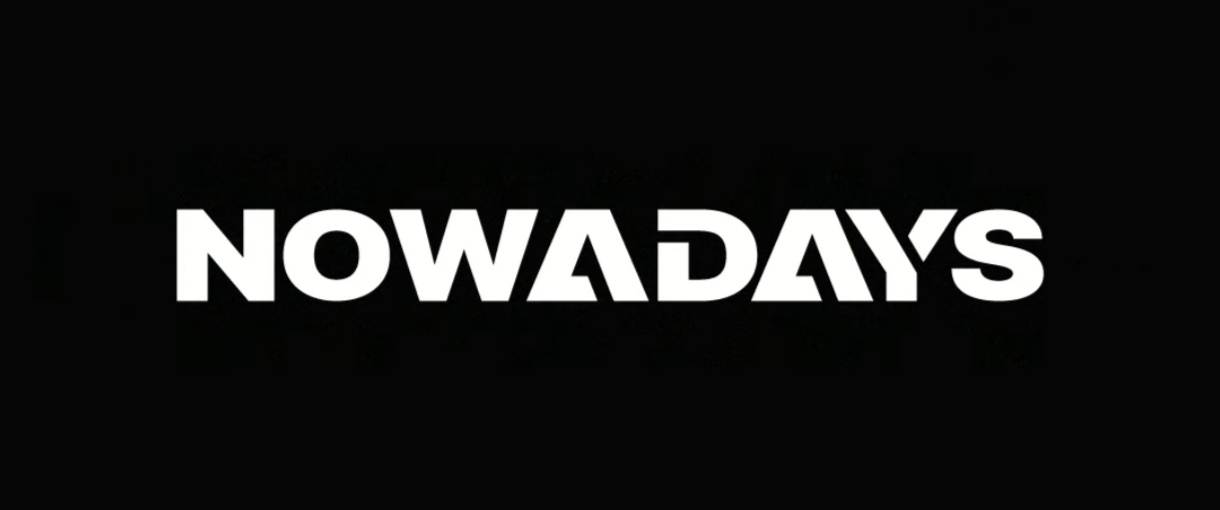
Nowadays logo

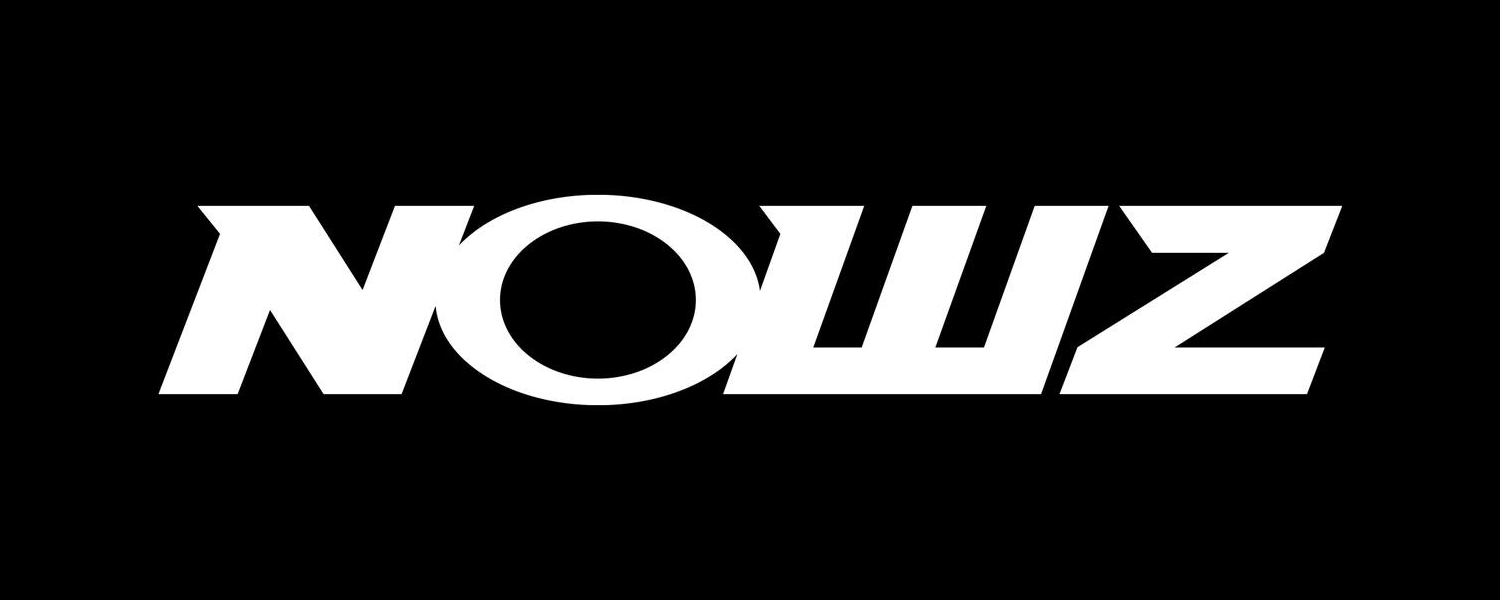
Nowz logo

The group's original name, Nowadays, contains "a strong aspiration to make the public and fans' curious about "Now" and a bold ambition to provide special memories for the "Days" the group will create together in the future".

The group's new name, Nowz, means 'drawing infinite possibilities at this moment', combining 'NOW' which means the present and 'Z' which symbolizes expanded possibilities and a new beginning, not the end.

== History ==
=== 2019–2023: Pre-debut and formation ===
In 2019, Hyeonbin participated in Mnet's reality competition survival series Produce X 101, where he was eliminated on episode 11 and placed 30th rank overall.

On October 30, 2023, Cube Entertainment announced that they planned to launch a new boy group consists of five members in first quarter of 2024.

On November 9, 2023, it was confirmed that Hyeonbin would be debuting in Cube's new boy group.

=== 2024: Debut, "Rainy Day", Nowhere, "Let's Get It" ===
On March 4, Cube officially introduced Nowadays and opened their social media accounts. They also released a video titled "Now, A _____ Days" with the words: "Now, A", "Days", "Curious", "Dreamy" and "Youthful", hinting at the group's concept and theme. On March 7, the five members were officially introduced to the public. Nowadays initially promoted their own genre called "Days pop" with the notion that it "will permeate everyone's daily lives". On March 13, Nowadays released a logo motion for their eponymous debut single album. On March 19, Nowadays released a performance video for their song "Now" which would be included in their debut single album.

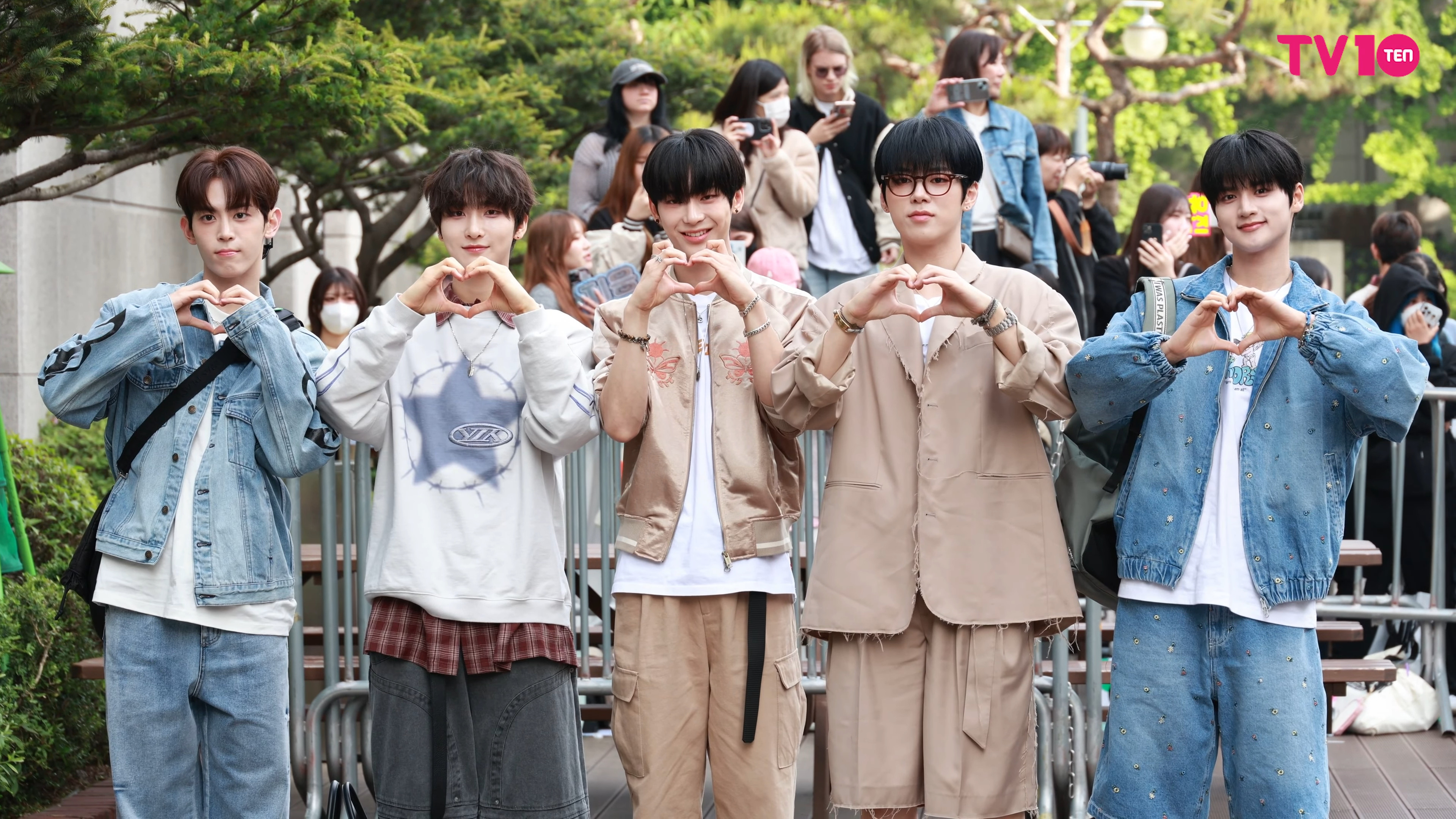
Nowadays at Music Bank in May 2024

On April 2, Nowadays officially debuted with their eponymous single album and its lead single "OoWee" along with a music video. They also held a press and fan showcases at Blue Square Mastercard Hall in Hannam-dong, Yongsan District, Seoul on the afternoon and evening of the same day, respectively.

On July 11, it was announced that Nowadays would be releasing a single "Rainy Day", a remake single of "On Rainy Days" originally by Beast. Pentagon's Hui participated as a producer for the single. The remake was released on July 16. The following month, the group released their second single album Nowhere on August 27 with the lead single "Why Not?".

On November 21, the group released a new single titled "Let's Get It", an "addictive" hip-hop genre song with strong electronic sounds added to unique string instruments.

=== 2025–present: New name, Ignition ===
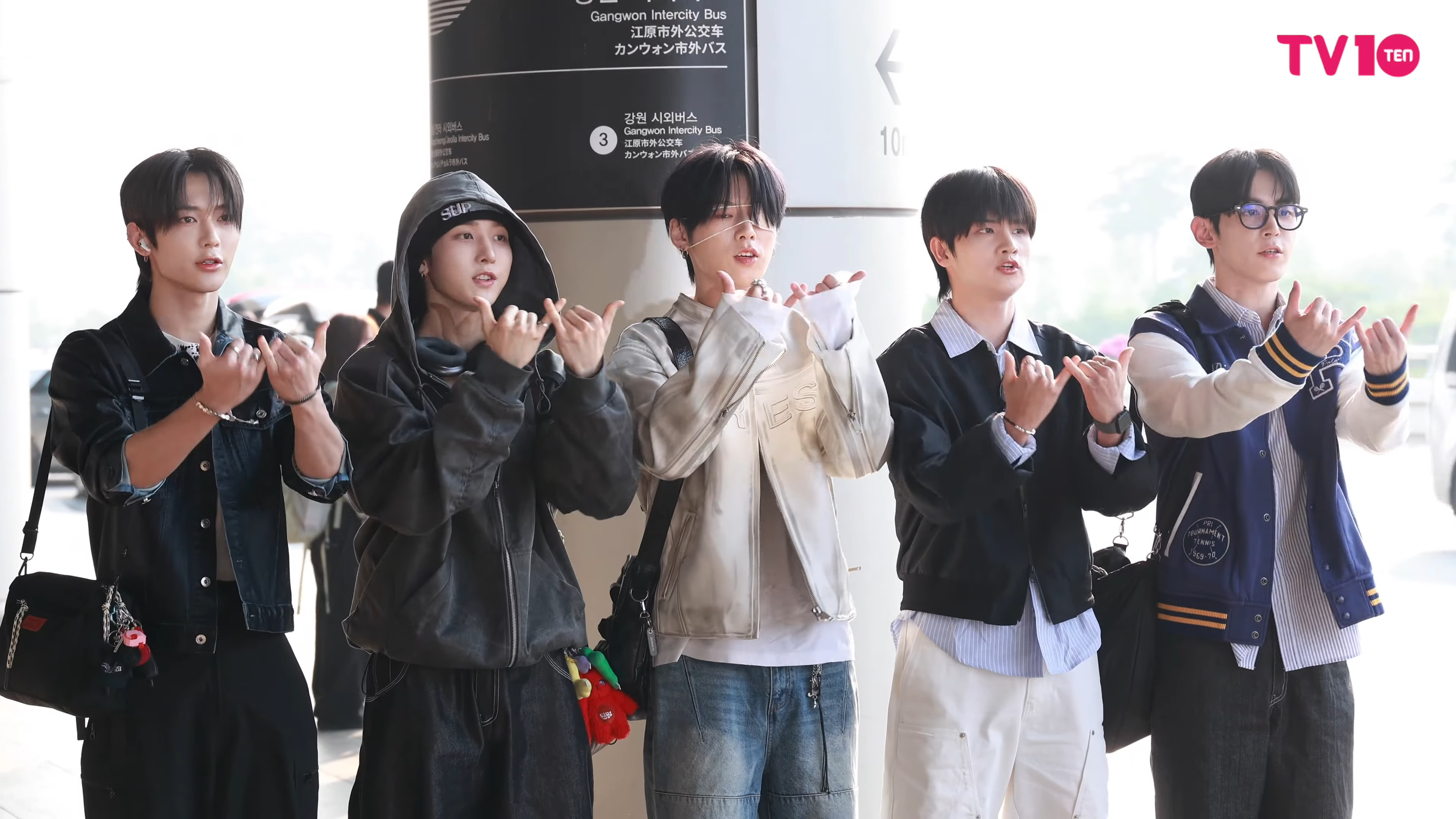
Nowadays in May 2025

On June 2, Nowadays announced on social media that they would be re-branding as Nowz. Nowz released the pre-release single "Fly to the Youth" on June 17 as part of their upcoming EP, with labelmate Yuqi participating as a producer for the EP. On June 18, Nowz revealed their first EP Ignition would be releasing on July 9.

== Members ==
- Hyeonbin (현빈) – leader
- Yoon (윤)
- Yeonwoo (연우)
- Jinhyuk (진혁) – rapper
- Siyun (시윤)

== Discography ==
=== Extended plays ===
List of extended plays, showing selected details, selected chart positions and sales
Title	Details	Peak chart positions		Sales
Title	Details	KOR	JPN	Sales
Ignition	Released: July 9, 2025; Label: Cube Entertainment; Formats: CD, digital download, streaming; Track listing: 1. "Fly to the Youth" (featuring Yuqi); 2. "Everglow"; 3. "Problem Child"; 4. "Louder"; 5. "Day_And"	3	—	KOR: 149,103
Nowz	Released: March 4, 2026; Label: Warner Music Japan; Formats: CD, digital download, streaming; Track listing: 1. "Ammo" (featuring YRD Leo); 2. "HomeRun" (Japanese ver.); 3. "Get Buck" (Japanese ver.); 4. "Run with Me" (名付けられていない世界へ; Japanese ver.); 5. "Fly to the Youth" (自由に羽ばたいて; Japanese ver.)	—	12	JPN: 5,154

=== Single albums ===
List of single albums, showing selected details, selected chart positions and sales
Title	Details	Peak chart positions	Sales
Title	Details	KOR	Sales
Nowadays	Released: April 2, 2024; Label: Cube Entertainment; Formats: CD, digital download, streaming; Track listing: 1. "Now"; 2. "OoWee"; 3. "Ticket"	10	KOR: 54,488
Nowhere	Released: August 27, 2024; Label: Cube Entertainment; Formats: CD, digital download, streaming; Track listing: 1. "Why Not?"; 2. "Heart vs Head"; 3. "Troublesome (걔말고너)"	6	KOR: 84,398
Play Ball	Released: November 26, 2025; Label: Cube Entertainment; Formats: CD, digital download, streaming; Track listing: 1. "Get Buck"; 2. "Homerun"; 3. "Run with Me"	9	KOR: 100,683

=== Singles ===
List of singles, showing year released, selected chart positions, and name of the album
Title	Year	Peak chart positions	Album
Title	Year	KOR Down.	Album
Nowadays
"OoWee"	2024	154	Nowadays
"Rainy Day" (비가 오는 날엔; 2024 Remake version)	2024	138	Non-album single
"Why Not?"	2024	90	Nowhere
"Let's Get It" (렛츠기릿)	2024	36	Non-album single
Nowz
"Fly to the Youth" (자유롭게 날아)	2025	84	Ignition
"Everglow"	2025	25	Ignition
"Home Run"	2025	105	Play Ball
"Us"	2026	—	Non-album single
"Achilles"	2026	76	Non-album single
Japanese
"Ammo" (featuring YRD Leo)	2026	—	Nowz

== Awards and nominations ==
Name of the award ceremony, year presented, award category, nominee(s) and the result of the award
Award ceremony	Year	Category	Nominee/work	Result	Ref.
Korea Grand Music Awards	2024	IS Rookies	Nowadays	Won	
MAMA Awards	2024	Artist of the Year	Nowadays	Nominated	
MAMA Awards	2024	Best New Male Artist	Nowadays	Nominated	
