= Hui (singer) =

South Korean singer (born 1993)

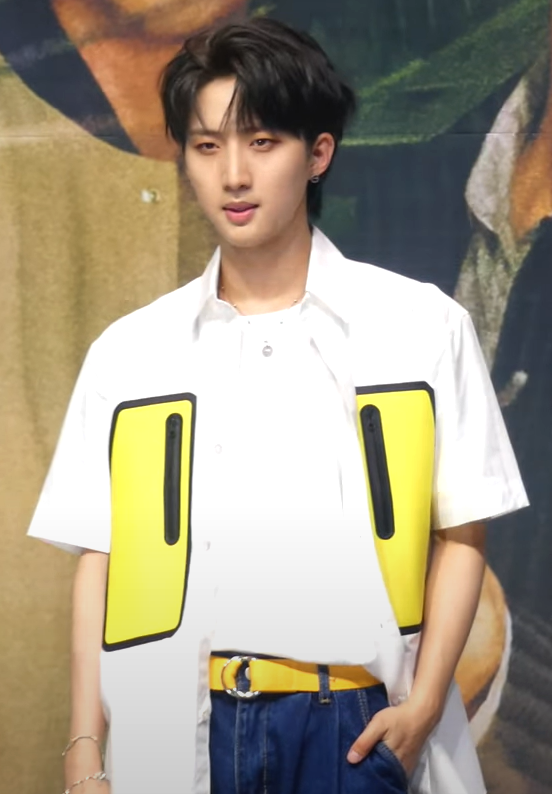
- Hui in July 2019
- Born: Lee Hoe-taek; August 28, 1993 (age 33); Gwacheon, South Korea
- Occupations: Singer; songwriter
- Musical career
- Genres: K-pop; R&B; ballad; dance-pop
- Years active: 2016–present
- Labels: Cube; With Us
- Member of: Pentagon; Super Five
- Formerly of: United Cube; Triple H
- Website: cubeent.co.kr/pentagon

Korean name
- Hangul: 이회택
- RR: I Hoetaek
- MR: I Hoet'aek

Lee Hoe-taek (Korean: 이회택; born August 28, 1993), better known as Hui (후이), is a South Korean singer, songwriter and composer. He debuted as the leader, main vocalist and lead dancer of boy group Pentagon in October 2016, under Cube Entertainment. He was a member of the co-ed trio Triple H, alongside former bandmate Dawn and former labelmate Hyuna, and is the leader of trot boy group Super Five of MBC's Favorite Entertainment. He is also well known for his participation in the reality competition series Boys Planet, where he placed 13th overall.

Hui participates in writing and producing a majority of Pentagon's songs. Some of his best-known works are Wanna One's "Energetic", Nation's Son's "Never", Produce X 101's "Boyness", JO1's "Oh-Eh-Oh", and Pentagon's "Shine", "Naughty Boy", and "Daisy".

== Name ==
At Pentagon's debut showcase, Hui explained the meaning behind his name: believing Lee Hoe-taek, his real name, is difficult to pronounce (particularly for foreigners), he settled on Hui as a mononym. During a stay in China, he discovered local people pronounce the first syllable of his name, Hoe/Hwe, as "Hui/Hwee", which inspired his decision.

== Early life and education ==
Hui was born on August 28, 1993, in Gwacheon, Gyeonggi-do Province, South Korea. In 2012, Hui graduated from Modern K Academy. On Comedian Singer Producer, Hui confessed that he was rejected from Hanyang University. He lived in Beijing, China for eight months before joining Cube in 2013.

== Career ==
=== Pre-debut ===
Hui used to be a JYP trainee before joining Cube Entertainment. In 2010, he won first place on Best Male Vocal at JYP 7th Audition Final Round. In 2013, Hui was preparing to debut in China. He failed to make the cut into Chinese Idol as he was placed 60th and immediately dropped out from the show. In an open audition in 2013, after leaving JYP, he was the only participant selected by all three entertainment agencies (Cube, Sonic Music and Nega Network). In December 2013, Hui danced at the KBS Festival and danced to the special stage of Son Dong-woon and Kwon So-hyun. In 2014, Hui appeared in G.NA's "Secret" music video and promotional activities. He also appeared in Rain's "Rain Effect" as a trainee, and received advice from Rain about debut. Hui spent about six years as a trainee before debuting with Pentagon. In February 2015, Hui was part of a vocal project group, Seorin-dong Children (서린동 아이들) with Jinho and another female singer. They released a remake of Lee Won-jin and Ryu Keum-deok's 1994 classic "For All the New Lovers". The group wasn't supposed to consist of them, but after the three recorded the guide, Cube's Artist Development team decided to release it.

=== 2016–2019: Debut with Pentagon and solo activities ===
On October 10, 2016, Hui made his official debut as a member of Pentagon through 2016 Mnet's reality show Pentagon Maker and becoming the leader of the group. He made a cameo on the web drama Spark.

On April 4, 2017, Cube Entertainment announced that he would participate in a project group called Triple H alongside Hyuna and E'dawn and that they would star in a reality show called Triple H Fun Agency. The group debuted on May 1 with the EP 199X and title track "365 Fresh".

In 2017, Hui co-composed the Produce 101 season 2 hit song, "Never" and Wanna One's debut single, "Energetic" alongside Flow Blow which won by public votes on which song they'd like to see for the group's debut single. Both songs achieved an all-kill on Instiz, charting at No. 1 on real-time charts of Melon, Mnet, Bugs, Genie, Soribada, and Naver.

On September 19, it was revealed that Hui participated in the music variety show Hyena on the Keyboard. On October 20, Hui was cast for One Night Food Trip alongside his label mate Yoo Seon-ho. The filming started in Vietnam on October 22.

In just 2018, Hui co-composed Kriesha Chu's "Paradise", "This Stop", Shinwha's "Don't Leave Me, Pentagon's "Shine" and three songs from Thumbs Up!. On June 9, Pentagon and labelmates (G)I-dle appeared on Idol Room. During the episode, Hui performed his self-produced track, "Theme song 1" alongside Jeon So-yeon's "Theme song 2", and they gifted the songs to the show. At the end of 2018, he collaborated with Jinho and Oh My Girl's Seunghee at the 2018 Korea Popular Music Awards to perform a cover of "I Have a Dream" on December 20.

In May 2019, Hui produced "Dramatic" for the rookie girl group Bvndit. In October, he co-wrote and co-composed the song "119" from VAV's fifth EP Poison.

=== 2020–2023: Super Five, musical debut, and Boys Planet ===
In 2020, Hui co-composed three songs from Pentagon's Universe: The Black Hall: "Dr. Bebe", "Shower of Rain", and "The Black Hall". On February 29, he performed Jung Soo-ra's "Exultation" on KBS' program Immortal Songs 2 as a duo with Jinho. Hui appeared on Stark's Idol Cooking Class alongside bandmates Hongseok, Shinwon and Kino. He also appeared on Mnet's music talk show Studio Music Hall 2, which aired on March 24. He was introduced as "genius music producer" performing his rearranged rock version of Itzy's "Dalla Dalla" and a duet of Kim Kwang-seok's "At About Thirty". On March 28, he was featured on the song "Shout Out" from album Spirit Bomb, a full-length album by Han Yo-han.

On July 11, 2020, Hui appeared on MBC's Favorite Entertainment, a music variety program aimed to create a top trot boy group In the third episode, he auditioned with Sim Soo-bong's "I Don't Know Anything But Love" and performed a dance cover of "Gang" by Rain. Hui passed the auditions and was selected as one of five members of the idol trot group alongside Astro's MJ, Ok Jin-wook, A.cian's Chu Hyeok-jin and Park Hyeong-seok. On August 15, the group released a pre-debut digital single titled "Hello" (잘 될 거야) under the name Super Five (다섯장) while using his real name Lee Hoe Taek. They held their debut stage on MBC's Show! Music Core with "All Eyes On Me" and "Hello" on August 22. An accompanying music video for the song was uploaded onto MBC's YouTube channel on August 29. On September 19, they held their final concert Hello, Goodbye Concert before their indefinite disbandment. Hui also performed his solo project song, "Step by Step" (한 걸음 한 걸음) in the concert.

On July 22, it was announced that Hui would make his musical debut in a psychological thriller musical Sonata of a Flame (광염 소나타) as J, a composer suffering from anxiety. The musical ran from August 15 to 30 at Uniplex Hall 1, Seoul, and a live stage was broadcast online to the US, Japan, and South East Asia in September.

Cube Entertainment confirmed that Hui composed JO1's song "Oh-Eh-Oh", the title track to their second single Stargazer, released on August 26. Attention was drawn to the fact that JO1 member Ren Kawashiri was previously a backup dancer for Pentagon during their Dear Cosmo Tour. The song ranked at number one and thirty-three on Billboard Japan Hot 100 and Top Download Songs, respectively.

Hui participated in MBN's concept variety music game show, Lotto Singer, premiering in September. He and Flow Blow produced the title song for WEi's debut album Identity: First Sight entitled "Twilight". On December 16, it was confirmed that he would be producing a song for the Top 7 competition on Mnet's audition show Cap-Teen. The ballad song, "White Butterfly", was sung by contestant Kim Han-byul, who placed second overall.

==== Mandatory military service ====
On October 19, 2020, Cube announced that Hui would be enlisting in the mandatory military service on December 3. He is the second Pentagon member to fulfill his defense duties after Jinho, who began his service in May. On December 2, Cube shared that Hui's enlistment was delayed. Hui enlisted as a social worker on February 18, 2021, two months after his original date. Hui was discharged from military service on November 17, 2022.

On June 17, 2021, Hui released the song "Imagine" as the first OST for the drama Monthly Magazine Home. He wrote and co-produced CIX's promotional single "Tesseract" for the app Universe, which was released on July 1.

==== Boys Planet ====
In February 2023, Hui was announced as a contestant on Boys Planet using his real name, Lee Hoe-taek. He was ranked the 7th in the first ranking reveal. He ultimately placed 13th in the final episode, failing to debut in the final lineup of Zerobaseone.

In July, Hui released the song "Whale" as a part of the +Memory Project. In August, he was cast as D'Artagnan in the musical The Three Musketeers, scheduled from September 15 to November 19 at KEPCO Art Center.

=== 2024–present: Solo debut and departure from Cube Entertainment ===
In January 2024, Hui made his solo debut with the mini-album Whu Is Me: Complex. The project contains four tracks, including the lead single "Hmm Bop". He produced the single "Jackpot" by Vanner that same month. In June, he produced the "Rainy Days (2024 Remake ver.)" for Cube labelmates Nowadays. In August, he released the single "Easy Dance" featuring Kwon Eun-bi. The duo drew attention due for their performance of the song at the Waterbomb festival in Sokcho. He released the digital single "Nameless" featuring Jang Hye-jin in October. Hui appeared as a "special director" for the JTBC survival show Project 7 in October, and appeared in Starlight Boys in a similar role in November. In December, he released the digital single Whu Is Kevin featuring two songs, the lead single "Spring in the Winter" and "Home Alone" featuring Hanhae. Hui also sang the songs "My Side" for the romanic-comedy drama No Gain No Love and "Such A Day" for the comedy-drama A Virtuous Business.

Hui portrayed Dracula's butler Dimitri in the musical Bloody Love from December 2024 to February 2025 at the Hanwha Arts Center in Seoul. In February, he released the song "My Memory" in a project commemorating the 20th anniversary of the Korean Wave. The next month, he released the rock ballad "Promise You", which acted as the first release in a wedding song project. He played Donghyun in the 30th anniversary production of the musical Love in the Rain starting in April at the Baekam Art Hall. In May, he and bandmate Jinho hosted the Japanese travel show Colorful Japan: Pentagon in Shikoku. In June, Hui and Jinho were announced as a part of the "Master" lineup for the KBS survival show B:My Boyz. Acting as the show's "Production Master", he produced two songs for the final round, "Knockin' On Heaven" and "Slanted". He also participated in the OST for the drama The First Night with the Duke with the song "How About We Start Our Love?". Hui participated in the project song "Old Song" alongside VIXX's Ken, Got7's Youngjae, Lucy's Choi Sang-yeop. In July, he produced the single "Starlight" by the EBS virtual idol David Bong.

In July 2025, Hui left Cube Entertainment after 9 years with the company. In September, he released the OST song "Lights, Camera, Action" for the drama Confidence Queen. Hui officially signed to With Us Entertainment in November.

== Artistry ==
=== Influence ===
Hui is called an "all-rounder" idol, and is frequently praised for his vocal, acting, songwriting, producing, and composing skills. He has earned the nickname "genius producer", as he frequently produces songs for Pentagon, himself, and other artists. Hui is seen as a role model for his abilities as a vocalist and a producer-idol to other idols, including Yoo Seon-ho, DKB's Teo, MustB's Doha, and BDC's Junghwan.

=== Songwriting and musical style ===
Before I even make the music, I draw out the performance in my head. After I think about the overall mood, outfits, props, dancers' movements, and the character of whoever is singing the song, I write the song and participate in the choreography and costumes before eventually going on stage. When creating a performance, what is just as important as the music is the fashion.

— Hui on his songwriting process.

In an episode of TMI News, Hui revealed that he arranges songs in his sleep. "I seem to get more stressed than I realize, because I've been arranging songs in my dreams. My members keep waking up to the sound of me singing. I've been singing in my sleep."

== Discography ==
=== Extended plays ===
List of EPs, with selected details, peak chart positions and sales
Title	Details	Peak chart positions		Sales
Title	Details	KOR	JPN	Sales
Whu Is Me: Complex	Released: January 16, 2024; Label: Cube Entertainment; Formats: CD, digital download, streaming; Track listing: 1. "Hmm Bop"; 2. "Melo" (with Park Hyeon-jin); 3. "Cold Killer" (with Jinhyuk); 4. "A Song from a Dream" (with Wooseok)	4	32	KOR: 33,745; JPN: 1,082

=== Singles ===
List of singles, with selected peak chart positions and sales
Title	Year	Peak chart positions	Sales (DL)	Album
Title	Year	KOR	Sales (DL)	Album
As lead artist
"Wake Me Up" with Jo Woo-chan	2017	90	KOR: 17,921+	Hyena on the Keyboard
"Navigation"	2018	—	—N/a	Breakers Part 3
"Bodyguard"	2018	—	—N/a	Breakers Part 5
"Swim Good" featuring Somin of KARD	2018	—	—N/a	Breakers Semi-final
"For You"	2018	—	—N/a	Breakers Final
"Masquerade" (가장 무도회)	2020	—	—N/a	Lotto Singer Episode 7
"Whale"	2023	—	—N/a	—N/a
"흠뻑 (Hmm BOP)"	2024	—	—N/a	Whu Is Me: Complex
"Easy Dance" featuring Kwon Eun-bi	2024	— (Note: "Easy Dance" did not enter the Circle Digital Chart, but peaked at number 41 on the component Circle Download Chart.)	—N/a	Non-album single
"Nameless" featuring Jang Hye Jin	2024	—		Non-album single
"Spring in the Winter" (겨울의 봄)	2024	—		Whu Is Kevin
"내일의 나에게"	2026	—		Non-album single
"Bingo"	2026	—		Non-album single
As featured artist
"Shout" Han Yo-han feat. Hui	2020	—	—N/a	Spirit Bomb
Collaborations
"시작되는 연인들을 위해" Hui as 서린동 아이들 with Jinho & Yongjoo	2015	—	—N/a	시작되는 연인들을 위해
"Happy Winter Song" with Jinho	2016	—	—N/a	United Cube Project Part 2
"You Are" with Jinho, Hongseok, Shinwon, Yeo One, Yan An, Kino	2016	—	—N/a	Pentagon
"Thank You" with Jinho	2017	—	—N/a	Ceremony
"This Stop Is" with YooA and Wooseok	2018	—	—N/a	Gag-Singer Producer - Streaming
"All My Heart" (진심) with Jinho	2019	—	—N/a	MBC What Is The First place? Part 1
"Sad Love Song" (슬픈 사랑의 노래) with Lyn	2019	—	—N/a	The Call 2 Third Project
"Lift Trophy" (수상소감) with Hangzoo	2019	—	—N/a	The Call 2 Fifth Project
Soundtrack appearances
"Who Am I"	2017	—	—N/a	Bad Guys 2 OST Part 1
"Maybe"	2018	—	—N/a	About Time OST Part 3
"Miss U" with Jinho and Kino	2019	—	—N/a	On The Campus OST
"How Can I Do" with Jinho and Wooseok	2019	—	—N/a	Welcome to Waikiki 2 Part 4 OST
"Unrequited Love" (짝사랑)	2019	—	—N/a	Chocolate Part 8 OST
"Imagine"	2021	—	—N/a	Monthly Magazine Home Part 1 OST
"My Side"	2024	—	—N/a	No Gain, No Love Part 3 OST
"Such A Day"	2024	—	—N/a	A Virtuous Business Part 4 OST
"How About We Start Our Love?" (우리 시작할까요) with Boramiyu	2025	—	—N/a	The First Night with the Duke Part 2 OST
"—" denotes releases that did not chart or were not released in that region.

=== As Lee Hoe-taek of Super Five ===
Title	Year	Peak chart positions
Title	Year	KOR
"Hello" (잘 될 거야)	2020	— (Note: "Hello" did not enter Gaon Digital Chart, but peaked at number 11 on Gaon BGM Chart.)
"All Eyes on You" (시선고정)	2020	— (Note: "All Eyes on You" did not enter Gaon Digital Chart, but peaked at number 20 on Gaon Mobile Chart.)
"Step By Step" (한 걸음 한 걸음)	2020	—
"—" denotes releases that did not chart or were not released in that region.

== Filmography ==
=== Web drama ===
Year	Title	Role	Notes	Ref.
2016	Spark		Cameo	

=== Variety shows ===
Year	Title	Role	Notes	Ref.
2013	Chinese Idol	Contestant	Season 1 (ep. 2)	
2016	Pentagon Maker	Contestant		
2017	Triple H Fun Agency	Main cast		
2017	Hyenas on the Keyboard		Pilot music variety show for Chuseok holiday	
2017	One Night Food Trip	Cast member	Episode 40–43	
2018	Breakers	Contestant		
2018	King of Mask Singer	Contestant as "Crane Guy"	Episodes 141–142	
2018	Comedian Singer Producer	Cast member		
2019	GINI Stage	Cheering Team 2		
2019	The Call Season 2	Contestant		
2019	Hui's What To Wear Today	Cast member	4 episodes	
2020	Immortal Songs 2	Contestant	with Jinho (ep. 445)	
2020	Road to Kingdom	Contestant	with Pentagon	
2020	Favorite Entertainment	Contestant, regular member (Super Five)		
2020	Lotto Singer	Contestant		
2021	Cap-Teen	Producer		
2023	Boys Planet	Contestant		
2024	Project 7	Special		
2024	Starlight Boys	Producer		
2025	B:My Boyz	Producer		
2025	Colorful Japan: Pentagon in Shikoku	Host		

=== Theater ===
Year	Title	Role	Ref.
2020	Sonata of a Flame	J	
2023	The Three Musketeers	D'Artagnan	
2024–2025	Bloody Love	Dimitri	
2025	Love in the Rain	Donghyun	
