= 2021 in South Korean music =

The following is a list of notable events and releases that happened in 2021 in music in South Korea.

== Notable events and achievements ==
- January 9–10 – IU and BTS win the grand prizes at the 35th Golden Disc Awards.
- February 28 – Leenalchi, Jeongmilla, and BTS win the grand prizes at the 18th Korean Music Awards.
- March 4 – IFPI names BTS its Global Recording Artist of the Year for 2020—they are the first Asian and first non-English speaking act to top the ranking.
- March 5 – "Dynamite" by BTS wins its 32nd music show win, the most out of any K-pop song in history, surpassing "Invisible Love" by Shin Seung-hun with 31 wins set in 1992.
- March 13 – "On the Ground" by Rosé becomes the most viewed YouTube music video in 24 hours by a solo K-pop artist, surpassing the record set by Psy with "Gentleman" in 2013.
- March 14 – "Rollin'" by Brave Girls wins the group's first music show award, following a surge in popularity due to a compilation featuring the group performing the song going viral.
- March 22 – "Rollin'" breaks the record for most perfect all-kills by a female group since its inception in 2010, with 198 hourly PAKs.
- June 1 – "Butter" by BTS becomes their fourth number-one single on the Billboard Hot 100, making them the fastest group to score four number ones since the Jackson 5 in 1970.
- June 17 – Twice's Taste of Love attains a peak of number 6 on the Billboard 200, making them the first female Korean act to chart an EP within the top-ten, and the second female Korean act overall to enter the top-ten on the chart.
- August 27 – Melon and Seoul Shinmun publishes their list of 100 Top K-pop Songs of All-Time, selected by a panel of 35 music critics and industry professionals.
- September 1 – Stray Kids's Noeasy becomes their first album to sell over 1 million copies, making them the first act under JYP Entertainment to achieve the milestone.
- September 10 – Blackpink becomes the most-subscribed music act on YouTube, surpassing Canadian singer Justin Bieber with 65.1 million subscribers.
- September 13 – Lisa's "Lalisa" becomes the most-viewed video by a solo singer on YouTube within 24 hours, garnering 73.6 million views.
  - CL and Rosé become the first South Korean female musicians to attend the Met Gala in New York City.
- September 15 – "Dynamite" is included in Rolling Stone's list of 500 Greatest Songs of All Time.
- October 28 – Lee Jang-hee is awarded the Eungwan Cultural Medal at the Korean Popular Culture and Arts Awards.
- November 3 – NCT 127's Sticker and its repackage Favorite records a total of 3.58 million units in sales, the highest figure for a combined album by an SM Entertainment artist.
- November 21 – BTS wins three awards at the American Music Awards, including Artist of the Year, the first Asian act to do so.
- December 4 – IU, Aespa, and BTS win the grand prizes at the 2021 Melon Music Awards.
- December 11 – Lee Hyori hosts the 2021 Mnet Asian Music Awards, the ceremony's first female host.
  - BTS wins all four grand prizes at the 2021 MAMA.

== Award shows and festivals ==
=== Award ceremonies ===
2021 music award ceremonies in South Korea
| Date | Event | Host |
|---|---|---|
| January 9–10, 2021 | 35th Golden Disc Awards | Ilgan Sports and JTBC Plus |
| January 13, 2021 | 10th Gaon Chart Music Awards | Korea Music Content Association |
| January 31, 2021 | 30th Seoul Music Awards | Sports Seoul |
| February 27, 2021 | 5th Korean Hiphop Awards | HiphopLE and Hiphopplaya |
| February 28, 2021 | 18th Korean Music Awards | Korean Popular Music Awards Committee |
| October 2, 2021 | 4th The Fact Music Awards | The Fact and Fan N Star |
| December 2, 2021 | 6th Asia Artist Awards | Star News and Star Continent |
| December 4, 2021 | 13th Melon Music Awards | Kakao M |
| December 11, 2021 | 23rd Mnet Asian Music Awards | CJ E&M (Mnet) |

=== Festivals ===
2021 televised music festivals in South Korea
| Date | Event | Host |
|---|---|---|
| October 9, 2021 | Asia Song Festival | Korea Foundation for International Culture Exchange (KOFICE) |
| December 17, 2021 | KBS Song Festival | Korean Broadcasting System (KBS) |
| December 25, 2021 | SBS Gayo Daejeon | Seoul Broadcasting System (SBS) |
| December 31, 2021 | MBC Gayo Daejejeon | Munhwa Broadcasting Corporation (MBC) |

== Debuting and disbanding in 2021 ==
=== Debuting groups ===
- Billlie
- Blitzers
- bugAboo
- Ciipher
- Epex
- Hot Issue
- Ichillin'
- Ive
- Just B
- Kingdom
- Lightsum
- Luminous
- Mirae
- NTX
- Omega X
- Pixy
- Purple Kiss
- TFN
- Tri.be
- WJSN The Black
- Xdinary Heroes

=== Solo debuts ===
- Adora
- B.I
- BamBam
- D.O.
- Do Han-se
- I.M
- Jay B
- Jinyoung
- Joy
- Jo Yu-ri
- Kwon Eun-bi
- L
- Lee Seung-hyub
- Lisa
- Park So-yeon
- Rosé
- Sorn
- Wendy
- Young K
- Youngjae
- Yugyeom
- Yuqi

=== Disbandments ===
- 100%
- 1Team
- AOA Black
- B.O.Y
- Berry Good
- ENOi
- GFriend
- Hotshot
- Iz*One
- NTB
- Seven O'Clock
- Sonamoo
- Voisper
- We in the Zone

== Releases in 2021 ==
=== First quarter ===
==== January ====
| Date | Album | Artist(s) | Genre(s) | Ref. |
|---|---|---|---|---|
| 6 | 24 Part 2 | Jeong Se-woon | Pop | |
| 8 | MCND Age | MCND | Electronic, dance | |
| 11 | Voice: The Future Is Now | Victon | Pop rap, electronic | |
| 11 | The First Step: Treasure Effect | Treasure | Synthpop, EDM | |
| 11 | I Burn | (G)I-dle | House, dance | |
| 11 | Before Sunrise Part 1 | T1419 | EDM, hip hop | |
| 13 | Live On OST | Various artists | OST, dance-pop | |
| 14 | Used To This (Note: The following was released as a single but charted on the Gaon Album Chart.) | Jang Han-byul | Pop, dance | |
| 18 | Epik High Is Here Part 1 | Epik High | Hip hop | |
| 18 | Salute: A New Hope | AB6IX | Pop, alternative rock | |
| 18 | Noir | U-Know | Electronic, hip hop | |
| 19 | Season 3. Hideout: Be Our Voice | Cravity | Hip hop, EDM | |
| 19 | Devil | Oneus | Pop, electronic | |
| 19 | Undying Love | Berry Good | Pop | |
| 20 | Cherry Rush | Cherry Bullet | Pop | |
| 20 | And Then There Was Us | Hoppipolla | Alternative | |
| 25 | Yes. | Golden Child | Electronic, pop | |
| 25 | Idealism | Colde | R&B | |
| 25 | Lucky Man | Bobby | Rap, hip hop | |
| 26 | Dystopia: Road to Utopia | Dreamcatcher | Pop, pop rock | |
| 28 | I'm Not Cool | Hyuna | Pop | |
| 28 | Absence | Car, the Garden | Korean ballad | |

==== February ====
| Date | Album | Artist(s) | Genre(s) | Ref. |
|---|---|---|---|---|
| 2 | Hello Chapter 0: Hello, Strange Dream | CIX | Dance, pop | |
| 2 | Gaussian | Youra | Indie, R&B | |
| 3 | Memory | L | Pop | |
| 3 | Run On OST | Various artists | OST, ballad | |
| 4 | Hardy | Babylon | Hip hop | |
| 5 | True Beauty OST | Various artists | OST, ballad | |
| 8 | 2nd Desire [Tasty] | Kim Woo-seok | Pop, R&B | |
| 15 | Querencia | Chungha | Pop, EDM, synth-pop | |
| 15 | Monthly Project 2020 Yoon Jong-shin | Yoon Jong-shin | Korean ballad | |
| 16 | Paranoia | Kang Daniel | Pop | |
| 16 | Inside | Lucy | Rock | |
| 17 | Tri.be Da Loca | Tri.be | Pop, EDM | |
| 18 | History of Kingdom: Part I. Arthur | Kingdom | Pop | |
| 18 | The Way For Us | Kwon Jin-ah | TBA | |
| 19 | Duality | I.M | Hip hop | |
| 20 | Encore | Got7 | Rap, hip hop, dance | |
| 22 | Don't Call Me | Shinee | Hip hop, dance | |
| 22 | On The Track | Lee Seung-hyub | Hip hop | |
| 23 | Tail | Sunmi | Dance | |
| 24 | Identity: Challenge | WEi | TBA | |
| 24 | ONF: My Name | ONF | Dance | |
| 24 | Wings | Pixy | TBA | |
| 25 | Lovestruck in the City OST | Various artists | OST, ballad | |
| 25 | Yearbook 2020 | 015B | Pop ballad | |
| 26 | Love Synonym Pt.2: Right for Us | Wonho | R&B, EDM | |
| 26 | Replay: The Moment OST | Various artists | OST | |

==== March ====
| Date | Album | Artist(s) | Genre(s) | Ref. |
|---|---|---|---|---|
| 1 | Zero: Fever Part.2 | Ateez | Dance | |
| 2 | Flower 9 | MC Mong | TBA | |
| 2 | Series 'O' Round 1: Hall | Verivery | Dance | |
| 3 | Pieces by Rain | Rain | Dance, R&B | |
| 8 | The Intersection: Discovery | BDC | Electropop | |
| 10 | Full Bloom | Punch | TBA | |
| 11 | Now: Where We Are, Here | Ghost9 | TBA | |
| 12 | R | Rosé | Pop | |
| 15 | Love or Take | Pentagon | R&B, funk | |
| 15 | Into Violet | Purple Kiss | Dance | |
| 15 | I Like You | Ciipher | TBA | |
| 16 | The Renaissance | Super Junior | Pop, Hip hop, Dance | |
| 16 | A Better Tomorrow | Drippin | TBA | |
| 17 | We Play | Weeekly | Futurepop, R&B | |
| 17 | Killa | Mirae | TBA | |
| 19 | Midnight Blue (Love Streaming) | B.I | Ballad | |
| 25 | Lilac | IU | TBA | |
| 29 | Page | Kang Seung-yoon | TBA | |
| 29 | I'm | Kim Se-jeong | TBA | |
| 29 | Won't Forget You | Kim Sung-kyu | TBA | |
| 30 | Bambi | Baekhyun | R&B | |
| 30 | The Dice is Cast | DKB | TBA | |
| 31 | Unnatural | WJSN | Dance, ballad | |
| 31 | Before Sunrise Part. 2 | T1419 | Dance | |

=== Second quarter ===
==== April ====
| Date | Album | Artist(s) | Genre(s) | Ref. |
|---|---|---|---|---|
| 5 | All Yours | Astro | Dance, Korean ballad | |
| 5 | Scene26 | Lee Jin-hyuk | TBA | |
| 5 | Like Water | Wendy | Korean ballad | |
| 6 | Daydream | D-Crunch | Dance | |
| 7 | Change | Kim Jae-hwan | TBA | |
| 7 | Solar: Rise | Lunarsolar | TBA | |
| 7 | Timeabout | Yukika | City pop | |
| 8 | Intersection: Trace | BAE173 | TBA | |
| 8 | Instinct Part. 1 | OnlyOneOf | TBA | |
| 8 | Staydom | STAYC | Dance | |
| 12 | Atlantis | Shinee | Pop, dance | |
| 13 | Yellow | Kang Daniel | R&B, dance | |
| 13 | Redd | Wheein | Pop, R&B | |
| 13 | River Where the Moon Rises OST | Various artists | OST, ballad | |
| 14 | It's Not Your Fault | Dvwn | R&B | |
| 15 | Temperature of Love | Yoon Ji-sung | TBA | |
| 18 | Again | GreatGuys | TBA | |
| 19 | Romanticize | NU'EST | Dance | |
| 19 | The Book of Us: Negentropy | Day6 | Rock | |
| 19 | Dry Flower | Penomeco | TBA | |
| 20 | Disharmony: Break Out | P1Harmony | TBA | |
| 26 | Border: Carnival | Enhypen | Pop-rock, R&B | |
| 26 | Mo'Complete: Have a Dream | AB6IX | TBA | |
| 28 | City of ONF | ONF | Dance, ballad | |
| 28 | Issue Maker | Hot Issue | Dance | |
| 28 | Life Is a Bi... | Bibi | R&B, pop | |
| 30 | Guess Who | Itzy | Hip hop, Rock, Rap, dance, EDM, pop | |

==== May ====
| Date | Album | Artist(s) | Genre(s) | Ref. |
|---|---|---|---|---|
| 3 | The Blowing | Highlight | Dance, R&B | |
| 3 | Beautiful Night | Yesung | R&B, Ballad | |
| 7 | Lovin' | Ailee | TBA | |
| 10 | Hot Sauce | NCT Dream | R&B, Hip hop | |
| 10 | Dear OhMyGirl | Oh My Girl | Dance-pop, R&B | |
| 11 | Binary Code | Oneus | Dance, Pop | |
| 12 | Check-In | Blitzers | TBA | |
| 12 | My Attitude | WJSN the Black | TBA | |
| 12 | EP. 1 Genius | D.Ark | Hip hop | |
| 13 | A Page | Yuqi | Pop, dance-rock | |
| 14 | Switch It Up | Jay B | R&B, Soul | |
| 17 | 9 Way Ticket | Fromis 9 | Dance, pop | |
| 17 | Ring Ring | Rocket Punch | Synthpop | |
| 18 | Advice | Taemin | Pop, R&B | |
| 18 | Conmigo | Tri.be | TBA | |
| 20 | Bravery | Pixy | TBA | |
| 20 | Happen | Heize | R&B | |
| 20 | Re:Born | TO1 | TBA | |
| 21 | ㅅ (Siot) | Sung Si-kyung | TBA | |
| 25 | Last Melody | Everglow | Hip hop, EDM, dance | |
| 26 | The Other Side of the Moon | GWSN | Dance, R&B | |
| 28 | You Were My Breath | Cho Mi-yeon | Ballad | |
| 31 | The Chaos Chapter: Freeze | TXT | Pop, rock | |
| 31 | Hello | Joy | Modern rock | |

==== June ====
| Date | Album | Artist(s) | Genre(s) | Ref |
|---|---|---|---|---|
| 1 | One of a Kind | Monsta X | Hip hop, EDM, R&B | |
| 1 | Waterfall | B.I | Rap, Hip hop, R&B, Soul | |
| 2 | WAW | Mamamoo | Ballad | |
| 3 | Now: When We Are In Love | Ghost9 | Dance | |
| 3 | Syndromez | Zior Park | Hip hop | |
| 3 | Roses | Ravi | Hip hop | |
| 4 | Leesangsoon | Lee Sang-soon | TBA | |
| 7 | Don't Fight the Feeling | Exo | Pop, R&B, Dance | |
| 7 | Sneaker | Ha Sung-woon | TBA | |
| 7 | Man On The Moon | N.Flying | TBA | |
| 8 | Bipolar Pt.1: Prelude of Anxiety | Epex | Hip hop, Dance | |
| 9 | Identity: Action | WEi | Dance | |
| 9 | [3-2=A] | Woo Jin-young | Hip hop | |
| 10 | Vanilla | Lightsum | Dance | |
| 11 | Taste of Love | Twice | Hip hop, Bossa nova | |
| 14 | Connection | Up10tion | Dance | |
| 15 | Ribbon | BamBam | Hip hop, R&B | |
| 16 | Planet Nine : Alter Ego | Onewe | Rock | |
| 17 | Summer Queen | Brave Girls | Pop, Tropical house | |
| 17 | Point of View: U | Yugyeom | R&B, Soul | |
| 18 | Your Choice | Seventeen | R&B, Hip hop | |
| 23 | Siren:Dawn | A.C.E | Dance | |
| 28 | Fade | Han Seung-woo | TBA | |
| 28 | & | Loona | Pop, R&B, jazz | |
| 28 | Hello Future | NCT Dream | R&B, Dance | |
| 28 | Must | 2PM | Pop, R&B | |
| 29 | Free Pass | Drippin | TBA | |
| 30 | The Intersection: Contact | BDC | Electropop | |

=== Third quarter ===
==== July ====
| Date | Album | Artist(s) | Genre(s) | Ref. |
|---|---|---|---|---|
| 1 | History of Kingdom: Part II. Chiwoo | Kingdom | TBA | |
| 5 | Turn Over | SF9 | Dance, R&B | |
| 5 | Windy | Soyeon | Dance, Hip hop | |
| 5 | Right Through Me | Even of Day | Rock, ballad | |
| 8 | Us | Moon Jong-up | Pop, hip hop, dance | |
| 13 | Observe | Baek A-yeon | TBA | |
| 16 | Since 16' | Since | Hip hop | |
| 26 | Next Episode | AKMU | Synth-pop, retrowave, downtempo | |
| 26 | Empathy | D.O. | Ballad, R&B | |
| 28 | The Land of Fantasy: Captain Giorbo and the Old Fashioned Heroes | Jannabi | Indie, art rock | |
| 30 | Summer Holiday | Dreamcatcher | Rock, metal | |

==== August ====
| Date | Album | Artist(s) | Genre(s) | Ref. |
|---|---|---|---|---|
| 2 | Switch On | Astro | Dance, ballad | |
| 2 | Game Changer | Golden Child | TBA | |
| 4 | Play Game: Holiday | Weeekly | TBA | |
| 5 | The Moment : A Minor | Kim Woo-jin | Pop | |
| 6 | 1/6 | Sunmi | Dance, rock | |
| 9 | Thrill-ing | The Boyz | TBA | |
| 9 | Select Shop | Ha Sung-woon | TBA | |
| 9 | Popping | ONF | Dance, ballad | |
| 16 | Queendom | Red Velvet | Dance, R&B, soul | |
| 17 | OK Prologue: Be OK | CIX | Dance, R&B, ballad | |
| 17 | The Chaos Chapter: Fight or Escape | Tomorrow X Together | Pop, rock | |
| 19 | The Awakening: Written in the Stars | Cravity | TBA | |
| 19 | Vision | Luminous | Hip hop, R&B | |
| 23 | After 'We Ride' | Brave Girls | R&B, Pop-rock | |
| 23 | Noeasy | Stray Kids | hip hop, EDM, pop, R&B, rock | |
| 23 | Series 'O' Round 2: Hole | Verivery | Dance | |
| 24 | Open | Kwon Eun-bi | Pop, Dance | |
| 26 | SOMO:Fume | Jay B | R&B, Soul | |
| 30 | 4U: Outside | BtoB | TBA | |

==== September ====
| Date | Album | Artist(s) | Genre(s) | Ref. |
|---|---|---|---|---|
| 1 | Talk & Talk | Fromis 9 | TBA | |
| 6 | Stereotype | STAYC | Pop, Dance | |
| 6 | Eternal | Young K | Rock | |
| 8 | Hide & Seek | Purple Kiss | TBA | |
| 9 | 4 Only | Lee Hi | Ballad, R&B | |
| 9 | Youth | Luminous | Hip hop | |
| 10 | Lalisa | Lisa | Hip hop | |
| 13 | Zero: Fever Part.3 | Ateez | Hip Hop, EDM, pop | |
| 14 | Blue Letter | Wonho | TBA | |
| 15 | I Say Mamamoo: The Best | Mamamoo | TBA | |
| 15 | Miniseries | Sumin & Slom | R&B | |
| 17 | Sticker | NCT 127 | Hip hop, R&B, Pop | |
| 20 | Chocolate Box | Yang Yo-seob | TBA | |
| 24 | Crazy in Love | Itzy | EDM, Dance-pop, R&B, Soul, Rap, Hip hop | |
| 25 | Blaze | Do Han-se | Hip hop | |
| 27 | Bad Love | Key | Dance-pop, R&B | |
| 27 | Mo' Complete | AB6IX | TBA | |
| 28 | Blind | Ciipher | TBA | |

=== Fourth quarter ===
==== October ====
| Date | Album | Artist(s) | Genre(s) | Ref. |
|---|---|---|---|---|
| 5 | Savage | Aespa | Trap, Hip hop, EDM, Synth-pop | |
| 5 | Ddara | Golden Child | TBA | |
| 5 | Colors from Ars | Youngjae | R&B, soul, dance, ballad | |
| 5 | Only Lovers Left | Woodz | TBA | |
| 6 | Seat-Belt | Blitzers | TBA | |
| 6 | Turbulence | N.Flying | TBA | |
| 7 | Glassy | Jo Yu-ri | Dance, pop, ballad, R&B | |
| 12 | Dimension: Dilemma | Enhypen | TBA | |
| 12 | Veni Vidi Vici | Tri.be | Moombahton, Hip hop, Reggaeton, Pop, R&B, Future house, Dance | |
| 13 | Light a Wish | Lightsum | TBA | |
| 15 | To You | Hynn | TBA | |
| 18 | Ctrl+V | Lee Jin-hyuk | TBA | |
| 19 | With | Nam Woo-hyun | R&B, pop | |
| 20 | Alpha | CL | TBA | |
| 20 | Wanted | CNBLUE | TBA | |
| 21 | History of Kingdom: Part III. IVAN | Kingdom | Pop | |
| 22 | Attacca | Seventeen | TBA | |
| 22 | Precious | Sogumm | R&B | |
| 24 | Solo Road | Shim Kyu-seon | TBA | |
| 25 | Favorite | NCT 127 | Hip hop, R&B | |
| 25 | bugAboo | bugAboo | Dance, pop | |
| 27 | Amy | Ailee | TBA | |
| 27 | Just Beat | Just B | TBA | |
| 27 | Fire Saturday | Secret Number | TBA | |
| 28 | Hot&Cold | Park Ji-hoon | TBA | |
| 28 | Old Story | Kassy | TBA | |
| 29 | XOXO | Jeon So-mi | Dance-pop, Hip hop | |
| 31 | me | Kim Na-young | TBA | |

==== November ====
| Date | Album | Artist(s) | Genre(s) | Ref. |
|---|---|---|---|---|
| 1 | Ballad 21 F/W | 2AM | Ballad | |
| 1 | Nothing Special With the Day | Im Chang-jung | TBA | |
| 1 | Maverick | The Boyz | Hip hop, EDM | |
| 2 | Countdown | Super Junior-D&E | Dance, R&B, Hip hop | |
| 3 | Blossom | Laboum | TBA | |
| 4 | Re:alize | TO1 | TBA | |
| 9 | Blood Moon | Oneus | TBA | |
| 11 | Cosmos | B.I | Hip hop, R&B, soul, rock, metal | |
| 10 | The Billage of Perception: Chapter One | Billlie | Dance-pop, Metal | |
| 12 | Formula of Love: O+T=<3 | Twice | Dance, latin pop, hip hop | |
| 15 | Re:T-ara | T-ara | TBA | |
| 16 | End Theory | Younha | TBA | |
| 17 | Nostalgia, Generous Giving Tree | Jeong Dong-won | TBA | |
| 18 | I Am Me. | Weki Meki | TBA | |
| 19 | No Limit | Monsta X | Hip hop, EDM, R&B | |
| 19 | Electrified: Urban Nostalgia | Ha Sung-woon | TBA | |
| 21 | 20 | from20 | Synthpop | |
| 22 | Firmament | Monni | TBA | |
| 22 | Rumination | SF9 | TBA | |
| 23 | Fireworks | Gaho | TBA | |
| 25 | Now: Who We Are Facing | Ghost9 | Dance-pop, R&B | |
| 29 | Christmas EveL | Stray Kids | Christmas, Rap, Trap, hip hop, dance, pop | |
| 30 | Peaches | Kai | R&B, dance-pop | |
| 30 | Dear Diary Moment | Cignature | TBA | |

==== December ====
| Date | Album | Artist(s) | Genre(s) | Ref. |
|---|---|---|---|---|
| 1 | Return of the Girl | Everglow | Hip hop, EDM, dance | |
| 1 | Eleven | Ive | Hip hop, R&B, electronic | |
| 3 | Goosebumps | ONF | TBA | |
| 6 | Happy Death Day | Xdinary Heroes | | |
| 7 | Studio We : Recording 2 | Onewe | Rock | |
| 7 | ["To Infinity."] | Mino | Hip hop, R&B | |
| 10 | Zero: Fever Epilogue | Ateez | TBA | |
| 14 | Universe | NCT | R&B, Hip hop, EDM | |
| 14 | The Collective Soul and Unconscious: Snowy Night | Billlie | TBA | |
| 21 | My Empty Space | Song I-han | R&B | |
| 23 | SKZ2021 | Stray Kids | TBA | |
| 27 | The Letter | Kim Jae-hwan | TBA | |
| 27 | 2021 Winter SM Town: SMCU Express | SM Town | Hip hop, R&B | |
| 29 | Pieces | IU | Ballad, Folk/blues | |
| 29 | DKHVKY | D.Ark | Hip hop | |

== Deaths ==
- Iron, age 29. Rapper.

== See also ==
- List of South Korean films of 2021
- List of Gaon Album Chart number ones of 2021
- List of Gaon Digital Chart number ones of 2021
