= Dream Concert (South Korea) =

Annual K-pop joint concert

- Joint concert by various K-pop artists
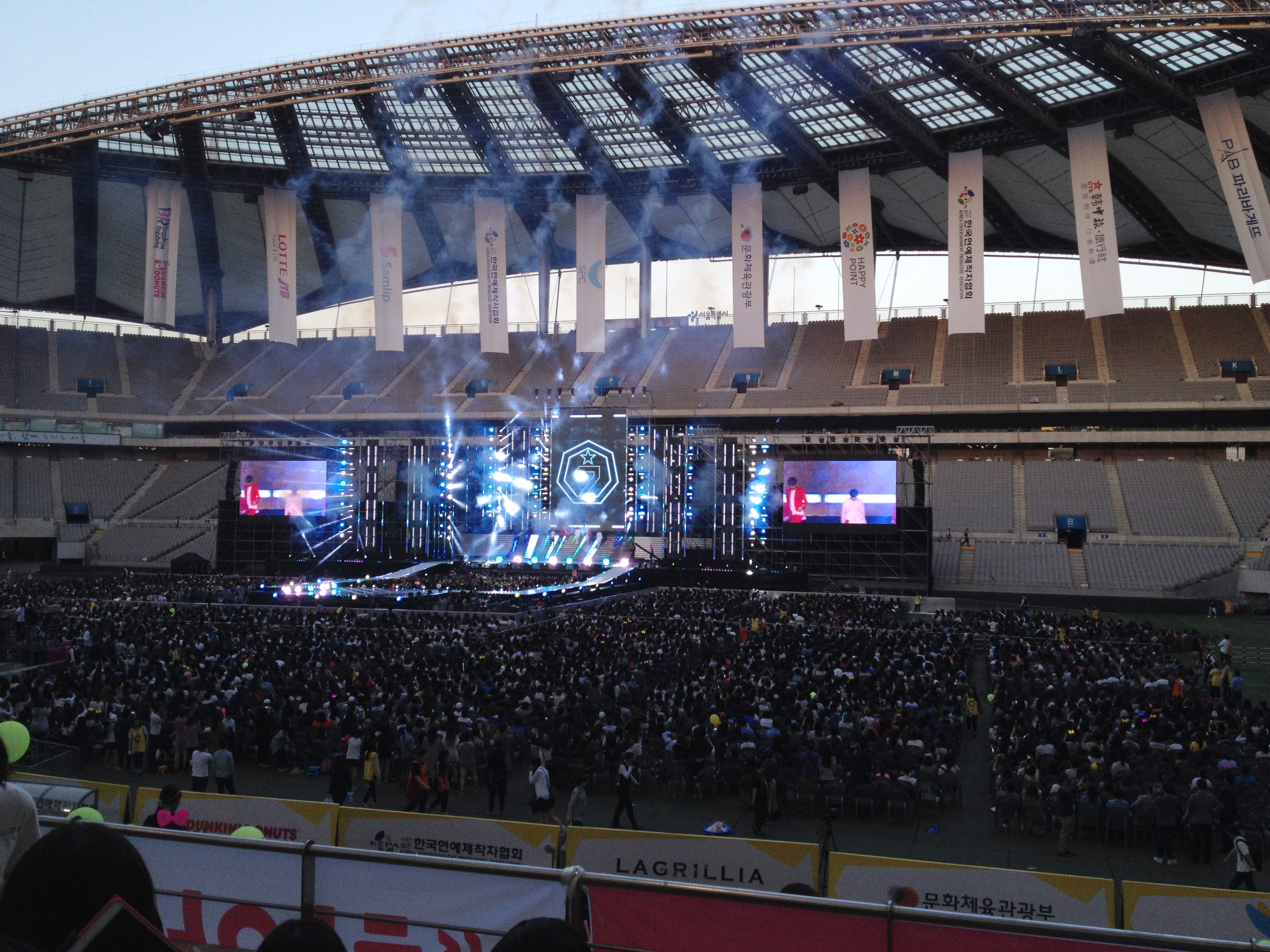
- Dream Concert 2015
- Duration: 1995 – present
- Website: http://www.dreamconcert.kr/

Dream Concert (드림콘서트) is one of the largest K-pop joint concerts in South Korea, which has been annually hosted by the Korea Entertainment Producer's Association (KEPA) since 1995. Each year, a number of the most popular K-pop artists of the year join the event for their performances.

== Locations and dates ==
=== 1990s ===
Date	City	Venue	Host	Artist lineup
May 13, 1995	Seoul, South Korea	Seoul Olympic Stadium	Kim Seung-hyun, Lee Bon	Deux; J. Y. Park; Park Mi-kyung; Roo'ra; Shin Seung-hun; Kim Gun-mo; N.EX.T; Kim Jong-seo; DJ DOC; Kim Won-jun; Shin Sung-woo; Shin Hyo-beom
June 15, 1996	Seoul, South Korea	Seoul Olympic Stadium	Lee Hoon, Kim Ye-bun	Turbo; Lee So-ra; DJ DOC; Kim Jung-min; Green Area; Roo'ra; R.ef; Kim Hyeon-cheol; Solid; Kim Gun-mo; Panic; IDOL
May 17, 1997	Seoul, South Korea	Seoul Olympic Stadium	Lee Hoon, Han Sung-ju	Uptown; Young Turks Club; Riaa; ZAZA; Cool; Goofy; Yangpa; Buck; Kim Jung-min; Lee Ye-rin; Cho Jang-hyuck; Gu Bon-seung; Untitle; Ahn Jae-wook; H.O.T.
May 23, 1998	Seoul, South Korea	Seoul Olympic Stadium	Ryu Si-won, Kim Hee-sun	NRG; Taesaja; Diva; Yangpa; Emerald Castle; Yoo Seung-jun; Sechs Kies; S.E.S.; Im Chang-jung; Turbo; Position; J. Y. Park; Eagle Five; Shinhwa; Kim Jung-min; H.O.T.; Lee Hyun-do; X-Teen
May 15, 1999	Seoul, South Korea	Seoul Olympic Stadium	Kim Jin, Kim So-yeon	g.o.d; Drunken Tiger; Park Ji-yoon; Jinusean; Clon; Kim Min-jong; S.E.S.; Sechs Kies; Yoo Seung-jun; Shinhwa; Kim Kyung-ho; Kim Hyun-jung; Sharp; Im Chang-jung; Fin.K.L; H.O.T.

=== 2000s ===
Date	City	Venue	Host	Artist lineup
May 20, 2000	Seoul, South Korea	Seoul Olympic Stadium	Ahn Jae-mo, Kim Min-hee	Moonchild; Click-B; SKY; Baby Vox; Im Chang-jung; Uhm Jung-hwa; Joo Young-hoon; Lee Ji-hoon; Jo Sung-mo; Turbo; Kim Hyun-jung; Chakra; 1TYM; Kim Min-jong; Fin.K.L; Clon; g.o.d; Sechs Kies
May 19, 2001	Seoul, South Korea	Seoul Olympic Stadium	Song Chang-hwan, So Yoo-jin	Chakra; Drunken Tiger; Uhm Jung-hwa; Park Hyo-shin; Wax; Click-B; Cho Jang-hyuck; Jo Sung-mo; Hong Kyung-min; Sharp; Im Chang-jung; Koyote; Cha Tae-hyun; UN; NRG; Psy; Kim Hyun-jung; Position; Fin.K.L; g.o.d
April 20, 2002	Seoul, South Korea	Seoul Olympic Stadium	Yoo Jae-suk, Chae Rim	Click-B; Lee Jung-hyun; 5tion; Lee Ki-chan; Joanne; Kim Jung-min; Kang Sung-hoon; Rich; Yumi; Shinhwa; Eun Ji-won; S.E.S.; V6; BoA; Sung Si-kyung; Lee Soo-young; Black Beat; Fin.K.L; g.o.d
May 17, 2003	Seoul, South Korea	Seoul Olympic Stadium	Kangta, Lee Hyori	Park Ji-yoon; Kim Gun-mo; Kim Bum-soo; Drunken Tiger; Park Hwayobi; Sung Si-kyung; g.o.d; Jewelry; Lee Soo-young; Click-B; Moon Hee-joon; BoA; Kangta; So Chan-whee; NRG; Cha Tae-hyun; Im Chang-jung; Cool; Seven; Lyn; Butterfly Effect; Kim Hyung-joong
June 5, 2004	Seoul, South Korea	Seoul Olympic Stadium	Kim Dong-wan, Kim Tae-hee	Rain; Lee Hyori; Koyote; Jewelry; TVXQ; Tei; Lee Ji-hoon; NRG; Shinhwa; Kim Bum-soo; Cherry Filter; Fly to the Sky; SG Wannabe; Moon Hee-joon; Buzz; Maya; Flower; Eun Ji-won; Baek Ji-young; UN
July 9, 2005	Seoul, South Korea	Seoul Olympic Stadium	Jun Jin, Andy, Ock Joo-hyun	Lee Min-woo; g.o.d; Lee Jae-won; Chae Yeon; SG Wannabe; Sobangcha; U;Nee; Koyote; BoA; CSJH; KCM; Eun Ji-won; Maya; Shin Hye-sung; Jewelry; Kangta; MC Mong; Buzz; Baechigi; Mose
May 27, 2006	Seoul, South Korea	Seoul Olympic Stadium	Danny Ahn, Han Eun-jung	SS501; Super Junior; Rain; SG Wannabe; Koyote; Jewelry; Kangta & Vanness; Epik High; Bada; Lim Jeong-hee; Maya; Paran; Ivy; Replay; Monday Kiz; Lee Hyori; SeeYa; 2Shai; KCM
June 9, 2007	Seoul, South Korea	Seoul Olympic Stadium	Lee Hwi-jae, Eugene	TVXQ; Super Junior; Lee Hyori; Epik High; SG Wannabe; K.Will; Baechigi; MC Sniper; Younha; SeeYa; Paran; Seo In-young; Ivy; Wonder Girls; Eru; Kara; CSJH
June 7, 2008	Seoul, South Korea	Seoul Olympic Stadium	Park Soo-hong, Song Ji-hyo, Kim Hee-chul	TVXQ; SS501; Super Junior; Wonder Girls; Mighty Mouth; Yoshihiro Akiyama; Girls' Generation; Epik High; Jewelry; MC Mong; A'st1; Typhoon; Maya; Shinee; Baechigi; Buga Kingz; Peter
October 10, 2009	Seoul, South Korea	Seoul World Cup Stadium	MC Mong, Song Ji-hyo, Kim Hee-chul	Super Junior; 2AM; Girls' Generation; Shinee; Jewelry; Big Bang; Kara; 4Minute; Chae Yeon; Wheesung; Kim Tae-woo; 2NE1; T-ara; MC Mong; f(x); Park Hyo-shin; 2PM

=== 2010s ===
Date	City	Venue	Host	Artist lineup
May 22, 2010	Seoul, South Korea	Seoul World Cup Stadium	Ok Taec-yeon, Shin Se-kyung, Kim Hee-chul	SS501; 2PM; Super Junior; After School; Girls' Generation; Wonder Girls; Kara; F.Cuz; Lee Hyori; T-ara; Davichi; Shinee; ZE:A; 4Minute; f(x); MBLAQ; BEAST; CNBLUE; Rainbow; U-KISS; Rain
May 28, 2011	Seoul, South Korea	Seoul World Cup Stadium	Song Joong-ki, Goo Hara, Kim Hee-chul	2PM; F-ve Dolls; F.T. Island; f(x); Miss A; Kim Tae-woo; TVXQ; Rainbow; Shinee; BEAST; Seo In-guk; Secret; Sistar; IU; After School; U-KISS; Kara; Eru; G.NA; K.Will; T-ara; 4Minute; Flower; Kim Soo-hyun
May 12, 2012	Seoul, South Korea	Seoul World Cup Stadium	Ok Taec-yeon, Han Seung-yeon, Yim Si-wan	Boyfriend; Apink; EXO-K; Davichi; Teen Top; Secret; Ailee; 4Minute; 2AM; MBLAQ; BEAST; Kara; B1A4; RaNia; ZE:A; T-ara; Sistar; Girls' Generation-TTS; Infinite; 2PM; TVXQ
May 11, 2013	Seoul, South Korea	Seoul World Cup Stadium	Onew, Goo Hara, Yoon Doo-joon	ZE:A; Kara; T-ara; T-ara N4; 2AM; Shinee; VIXX; U-KISS; Rainbow; Boyfriend; BEAST; Girls' Generation; Secret; Sistar; 4Minute; Girl's Day; BtoB; EvoL; Infinite; Speed; B1A4; EXO; Huh Gak
June 7, 2014	Seoul, South Korea	Seoul World Cup Stadium	Kangin, Eunhyuk, Baek Jin-hee	Girls' Generation; EXO; BEAST; 4Minute; BtoB; Apink; B1A4; Girl's Day; T-ara; Speed; VIXX; U-KISS; Rainbow; Block B; Dal Shabet; Bestie; Top Dogg; F.Cuz; Infinite; GOT7; Boys Republic; Tiny-G; ZE:A; Say Yes; M.Pire; C-Clown; So Real; Lip Service; Offroad; N-Sonic; YB; HALO
May 23, 2015	Seoul, South Korea	Seoul World Cup Stadium	Leeteuk, Park Gyeong-ree	Shinee; EXO; 4Minute; Infinite; HALO; Kara; Oh My Girl; VIXX; B1A4; Sistar; BtoB; Berry Good; Top Dogg; Secret; T-ara; GOT7; Red Velvet; EXID; Sonamoo; BTS; Speed; Boys Republic; Lovelyz; 9Muses; Monsta X; CLC; 24K
June 4, 2016	Seoul, South Korea	Seoul World Cup Stadium	Leeteuk, Kim So-hyun, Hong Jong-hyun, Mingyu, Jeonghan	EXO; Taemin; Mamamoo; Nam Woo-hyun; HALO; GFriend; April; Oh My Girl; Jo Jung-min; VIXX; B1A4; NU'EST; BtoB; T-ara; Red Velvet; Seventeen; DIA; December; B.I.G; Fiestar; Boys Republic; Lovelyz; CLC; 24K; NCT; Laboum; I.O.I; Hong Jin-young; Imfact; Berry Good; Romeo; Tahiti; A.cian; Wanna.B
June 3, 2017	Seoul, South Korea	Seoul World Cup Stadium	Leeteuk, S. Coups, Lee Sun-bin	Turbo; Taemin; EXO; Red Velvet; NCT 127; CLC; Brave Girls; DIA; Sonamoo; Laboum; Astro; Seventeen; Romeo; Snuper; Bigflo; B.I.G; VIXX; BtoB; Twice; NCT DREAM; 24K; Oh My Girl; April; MAP6; Cosmic Girls; Pristin; Gugudan
November 4, 2017	Pyeongchang County, South Korea	Pyeongchang Olympic Stadium	Leeteuk, Jin Se-yeon, Tony An	DIA; Laboum; Astro; B.A.P; HALO; Wanna One; NRG; DJ DOC; Baek Ji-young; Red Velvet; NU'EST W; EXO-CBX; B.I.G; Monsta X; TRCNG; Weki Meki; Ailee; Sunmi; CLC; Pristin; EXID; Gugudan; VIXX; BtoB
May 12, 2018	Seoul, South Korea	Seoul World Cup Stadium	Yoon Shi-yoon, Seol In-ah, Cha Eun-woo	Taemin; Lovelyz; Seventeen; Mamamoo; GFriend; TRCNG; DIA; Red Velvet; Uni.T; Astro; HALO; 24K; UNB; Fromis 9; The Boyz; Dreamcatcher; Bigflo; Golden Child; MXM; Myteen; In2It; IZ; Rainz; Younha; Wheesung; Sha Sha; Lipbubble; NCT
May 18, 2019	Seoul, South Korea	Seoul World Cup Stadium	Leeteuk, Jeon So-min, Gongchan	Taemin; Red Velvet; Seventeen; Mamamoo; NCT Dream; Nam Woohyun; Ilhoon; Ha Sungwoon; Oh My Girl; CLC; The Boyz; DIA; Golden Child; 1the9; Kim Dong Han; N.Flying; JBJ95; (G)I-DLE; TRCNG; GWSN; KARD; AB6IX; Kim Tae Woo; Park Bom; Hong Jin Young; Clon

=== 2020s ===
Date	City	Venue	Host	Artist lineup
July 25, 2020	Online	The K-Pop	Leeteuk, Kim Do-yeon, Kim Yo-han	Exo-SC; Red Velvet; Red Velvet - Irene & Seulgi; Oh My Girl; Astro; South Club; Golden Child; Kim Jae-hwan; AB6IX; CIX; Cravity
July 26, 2020	Online	The K-Pop	Eunhyuk, Lia, Cha Eun-woo	Mamamoo; Ha Sung-woon; Lovelyz; Cosmic Girls; Weki Meki; Jung Se-woon; The Boyz; Stray Kids; Oneus; Itzy; Rocket Punch
June 26, 2021	Online	LIVECONNECT	Leeteuk, Kim Do-yeon, Cha Eun-woo	AB6IX; A.C.E; Aespa; CIX; Itzy; NCT Dream; Golden Child; Kim Jae-hwan; Dreamcatcher; Laboum; Momoland; Brave Girls; Astro; Oh My Girl; ONF; WEi; Weki Meki; Forte di Quattro; Ha Sung-woon; Ariaz; Pixy; T1419; DKB; Drippin; Sinchon Tiger; AleXa; Kingdom; Hot Issue
June 18, 2022	Seoul, South Korea	Seoul Olympic Stadium	Doyoung, An Yu-jin	AB6IX; Cravity; Alice; CIX; Epex; NCT Dream; Golden Child; Dreamcatcher; Laboum; Ive; Kep1er; Lee Mujin; Oh My Girl; Lightsum; TAN; WEi; Nmixx; Pentagon; Red Velvet; STAYC; Trendz; Drippin; Victon; Weeekly; Classy; Kingdom; Younite
May 27, 2023	Busan, South Korea	Busan Asiad Main Stadium	Jo Jeong-sik, Yubin (Oh My Girl)	Golden Child; Kim Jae-hwan; Kim Tae-woo; Drippin; Dreamcatcher; BB Girls; Oh My Girl; Oneus; Everglow; Itzy; JO1; Nmixx; TAN; Tempest; Lapillus; Just B; Nine.I; Mirae; BtoB
October 19, 2024	Goyang, South Korea	Goyang Stadium	Leeteuk, Kwon Eun-bi	Kang Sung-hoon; The KingDom; Drippin; Dreamcatcher; Lightsum; Lucy; Xodiac; Xikers; CIX; ASC2NT; 8Turn; Xdinary Heroes; NCT Wish; n.SSign; Oneus; One Pact; Younite; Unis; EVNNE; Epex; JD1; Choi Ye-na; Kep1er; Kiss of Life; Tempest; Trendz; TIOT; Pow; Fifty Fifty; H1-Key
November 22, 2025	Abu Dhabi, United Arab Emirates	Etihad Park	Miyeon	S.Coups X Mingyu; Ateez; Miyeon; Seulgi & Joy (Red Velvet); Xikers; Bang Ye-dam; All(H)Ours; iii

== See also ==
- KCON
