= Studio We: Recording =

Demo album by Onewe
- Released: October 15, 2020
- Genre: Rock
- Language: Korean
- Label: RBW; Kakao M

Onewe chronology
One (2020)	Studio We: Recording (2020)	Memory: Illusion (2020)

Singles from Studio We: Recording
- 1. "Parting" Released: September 24, 2022

Music videos
- "Parting" on YouTube

Studio We: Recording is the first demo album by the South Korean band Onewe. The album was released by RBW on October 15, 2020, and distributed by Kakao M. It consists of nine tracks, including the pre-released single "Parting" and its instrumental, along with CD-only demo versions of "Parting" and other songs from the band's previous releases.

== Background and release ==
On September 11, 2020, Onewe released a music video teaser for a new song "Parting". The song was then revealed for the first time through a live performance at the band's O! New E!volution concert on September 12.

Written by member Kanghyun, "Parting" is inspired by a dream he often had as a child of an asteroid falling to Earth, and the lyrics convey the sincerity he could not convey to his loved ones on this last day before the asteroid hit. "Parting" was introduced as Kanghyun's sequel to his lead single "Regulus" from the band's single album 2/4. These became known as Onewe's "planet series", with the Korean word for planet (행성) included within both the titles of "Regulus" (Korean: 야행성; RR: Yahaengseong, literally "nocturnal") and "Parting" (Korean: 소행성; RR: Sohaengseong, literally "asteroid"). The series was then developed further with the addition of later releases into what has now become known as Onewe's "space series".

On September 21, it was confirmed that Onewe would officially release "Parting" on September 24. The song was released as a digital single along with its music video at 6pm KST. On the same day, RBW revealed the album details for the band's first demo album Studio We : Recording. "Parting" was included as the lead single for Studio We : Recording which was released as a physical album on October 15, 2020.

== Track listing ==
"Parting" pre-release

No.	Title	Lyrics	Music	Arrangement	Length
1.	"Parting" (소행성)	Kanghyun, CyA	Kanghyun, Jeon Da-woon (RBW), CyA	Jeon Da-woon (RBW), Kanghyun, Harin	4:00
2.	"Parting" (소행성) (Instrumental)		Kanghyun, Jeon Da-woon (RBW), CyA	Jeon Da-woon (RBW), Kanghyun, Harin	4:09
Total length:					8:00

Studio We : Recording demo tracks

No.	Title	Lyrics	Music	Length
3.	"Regulus" (야행성) (Melody guide 2)	Kanghyun, CyA, Heun-geul	Kanghyun, CyA
4.	"Parting" (소행성) (Prologue Mix)	Kanghyun, CyA	Kanghyun, CyA
5.	"Love Me" (내가 처음 만져본 강아지) (Guitar Rough)	Yonghoon, CyA	Kim Do-hoon (RBW), Yonghoon, Kanghyun
6.	"0&4" (공과 사) (Dialogue Rough)	Kanghyun, Yonghoon, CyA	Kanghyun, Yonghoon
7.	"Crazy good" (미쳤다 미쳤어) (Rock vibe)	CyA, Yonghoon	CyA, Yonghoon
8.	"If" (181125_2)	Yonghoon, CyA	Yonghoon, Jeon Da-woon (RBW), CyA
9.	"Reminisce About All" (다 추억 (Sunset Guitar vibe)	Yonghoon	Yonghoon, Kanghyun

== Charts ==
Chart (2021)	Peak position
South Korean Albums (Gaon)	15

== Release history ==
Country	Date	Format	Version	Label	Ref
Various	September 24, 2020	Digital download, streaming	"Parting"	RBW; Kakao M	
South Korea	October 15, 2020	CD	Studio We : Recording	RBW	
