= 3/4 (single album) =

Single album by Onewe
- Released: April 2, 2020
- Recorded: 2020
- Genres: Hiphop, R&B, bossanova, jazz
- Length: 7:00
- Language: Korean
- Labels: RBW; Stone Music Entertainment

Onewe chronology
2/4 (2019)	3/4 (2020)	One (2020)

Singles from 3/4
- 1. "Q" Released: April 2, 2020

Music videos
- "Q" (feat. Hwa Sa) on YouTube

3/4 is the third single album by the South Korean band Onewe. It was released by RBW on April 2, 2020, and distributed by Stone Music Entertainment. It contains the band's single "Q" featuring Hwasa of Mamamoo.

== Background and release ==
On March 23, 2020, RBW announced that Onewe would be releasing their third single album 3/4 on April 2, 2020. On March 26, it was announced that Hwasa would be featuring on the single "Q" through the release of new concept photos followed by a behind the scenes preview video of Onewe and Hwasa recording the song.

Following its release on April 2, Onewe made their first entry in the Billboard charts with the single entering at number 12 on the World Digital Song Sales chart.

On April 9, Onewe performed "Q" for the first time on national television with a special stage on Mnet's M Countdown.

== Track listing ==
No.	Title	Lyrics	Music	Arrangement	Length
1.	"Q" (feat. Hwasa) (모르겠다고)	CyA, Kim Jae-hyun	CyA, Jeon Da-woon (RBW), Yonghoon, Kim Jae-hyun, Noden	Jeon Da-woon (RBW), Noden	3:30
2.	"Q" (Inst.) (모르겠다고)		CyA, Jeon Da-woon (RBW), Yonghoon, Kim Jae-hyun, Noden	Jeon Da-woon (RBW), Noden	3:30
Total length:					7:00

== Charts ==
Chart (2020)	Peak position
World Digital Song Sales (Billboard)	12

== Release history ==
Country	Date	Format	Version	Label	Ref
South Korea	April 2, 2020	Digital, download	Standard	RBW; Stone Music Entertainment	
Various	April 2, 2020	Digital, download	Standard	RBW; Stone Music Entertainment	
