= Boys Da Capo =

Single album by BDC
- Released: October 29, 2019
- Genre: K-pop; R&B
- Length: 15:16
- Language: Korean
- Label: Brand New Music; Kakao M
- Producer: OUOW

BDC chronology
Boys Da Capo (2019)	The Intersection: Belief (2020)

BDC singles chronology
"Remember Me" (2019)	"Shoot The Moon" (2020)

Singles from Boys Da Capo
- 1. "Remember Me" Released: October 29, 2019

Boys Da Capo (stylized in all caps) is the debut single album by South Korean boy group BDC. It was released on October 29, 2019 by Brand New Music and distributed by Kakao M. The single album contains two tracks, including the lead single, "Remember Me", and their instrumentals.

== Background ==
On September 16, 2019, Brand New Music announced that Kim Si-hun, Hong Seong-jun, and Yun Jung-hwan will release a single as a unit on October. Then, they had their pre-debut reality show named Boys Don't Cry which had 4 episodes and was aired every Wednesday for 4 weeks starting from October 2. The reality show is showing their preparation for the debut, including the unit name's selection and street performance.

== Release ==
On October 17, Brand New Music released a teaser image showing Kim Si-hun, Hong Seong-jun, and Yun Jung-hwan facing backwards revealing "BDC" as the name of the unit with the word "Coming Soon" and a date "October 29th", which can be assumed as the release date of the single. On October 18-20, the concept photos of members starting from Kim Si-hun, Hong Seong-jun, and Yun Jung-hwan was released. On October 22, the group concept photo was released. The next day, on October 23, the cover artwork for the album was revealed. On October 24, Brand New Music released the album tracklist, which also revealed "Remember Me" as the lead single. Later, on October 25, they released the first music video teaser for "Remember Me". The next day, on October 26, the album preview was revealed. On October 28, the second music video teaser for "Remember Me" was released.

Then, on October 29, the album was released alongside the music video for the lead single, "Remember Me".

== Promotion ==
BDC had their debut stage on Mnet's M Countdown two days later on October 31, followed by performances on KBS2's Music Bank, MBC's Show! Music Core, SBS's Inkigayo, SBS MTV's The Show, and Arirang TV's Simply K-Pop.

They held a fan meeting titled "BDC 1st Fan Meeting: Remember You" at Yonsei University's Centennial Hall on November 24, 2019.

== Track listing ==
All tracks are written by OUOW.

No.	Title	Length
1.	"Remember Me" (기억되고 싶어; gieokdoego sipeo [lit. "I want to be remembered"])	3:50
2.	"Da Capo" (도돌이표; dodoripyo [lit. "Repeat sign"])	3:48
3.	"Remember Me" (Inst.)	3:50
4.	"Da Capo" (Inst.)	3:48
Total length:		15:16

== Charts ==
Weekly sales chart performance for Boys Da Capo
Chart (2019)	Peak position
South Korean Albums (Gaon)	10

Monthly sales chart performance for Boys Da Capo
Chart (2019)	Peak position
South Korean Albums (Gaon)	41

== Release history ==
Region	Date	Format	Label
South Korea	October 29, 2019	CD; digital download; streaming	Brand New Music, Kakao M
Various	October 29, 2019	Digital download; streaming	Brand New Music, Kakao M
