= Studio We: Recording 2 =

Studio We: Recording #2

Demo album by Onewe
- Released: December 7, 2021
- Genre: Rock
- Language: Korean
- Labels: RBW; Kakao Entertainment

Onewe chronology
Planet Nine: Alter Ego (2021)	Studio We: Recording #2 (2021)	Planet Nine: Voyager (2022)

Singles from Studio We: Recording #2
- 1. "Star" Released: November 23, 2022

Music videos
- "Star" on YouTube

Studio We: Recording #2 is the second demo album by the South Korean band Onewe. The album was released by RBW on December 7, 2021, and distributed by Kakao Entertainment. It consists of twelve tracks, including the pre-released single "Star" and its instrumental, along with CD-only demo versions of nine songs from the band's previous releases and special instrumental track "In Course".

== Background and release ==
On November 15, 2021, a schedule plan was released announcing Onewe's new song “Star” which was to be released on November 23, followed by the release of their second demo album Studio We: Recording #2 on December 7, leading up to the release of Onewe's second Planet Nine EP in January of the following year.

"Star" was pre-released as a digital single alongside a music video for the song at 6pm KST on November 23. It was then included as the lead single for the demo album, which was released as a physical album and also included demo versions of songs from the Onewe's previous EP Planet Nine: Alter Ego and single album Memory: Illusion, as well as a special instrumental track "In Course" which was first revealed at the band's Studio We : Live #6 concert in January 2021.

== Track listing ==
"Star" pre-release

No.	Title	Lyrics	Music	Arrangement	Length
1.	"Star" (별)	Jeon Da-woon (RBW), CocoDubuPapa (RBW), Yonghoon, CyA	Jeon Da-woon (RBW), CocoDubuPapa (RBW), Yonghoon, CyA	Jeon Da-woon (RBW), CocoDubuPapa (RBW)	4:09
2.	"Star" (별) (Instrumental)		Yonghoon, CocoDubuPapa (RBW)	CocoDubuPapa (RBW)	4:09
Total length:					8:18

Studio We : Recording #2 demo tracks

No.	Title	Lyrics	Music	Arrangement	Length
3.	"Aurora" (191108_1)	Kanghyun	Kanghyun	Kanghyun	3:22
4.	"Aurora" (191128_2)	Kanghyun, Yonghoon, CyA, Jeon Da-woon (RBW)	Kanghyun, Jeon Da-woon (RBW)	Jeon Da-woon (RBW), Kanghyun	3:44
5.	"Logo" (First Live Ver.)	Yonghoon, CyA	Yonghoon, CyA	CyA, Yonghoon, Kanghyun	3:24
6.	"A.I." (로보트도 인간에게 감정을 느낀다) (Guitar Rough)	CyA, Yonghoon	CyA, Yonghoon	CyA	4:10
7.	"Veronica" (베로니가의 섬) (Draft Guide)	CyA, Yonghoon	CyA, Yonghoon, Kanghyun	CyA	3:40
8.	"Rain to Be" (비를 몰고 오는 소년) (Original Topline Ver.)	Kanghyun, CyA	Kanghyun	Kanghyun	2:59
9.	"Cosmos" (천체) (Cosmos Guitar Vibe)	Kanghyun, CyA	Kanghyun	Kanghyun	3:23
10.	"A Book in Memory" (기억 속 한 권의 책) (Sensitive Piano)	Yonghoon	Yonghoon	Yonghoon	3:55
11.	"Aquarium" (Trauma Ver.)	CyA	CyA	CyA	1:02
12.	"In Course"		Kanghyun, CyA, Harin	Kanghyun, CyA, Harin

== Charts ==
Chart (2021)	Peak position
South Korean Albums (Gaon)	17

== Release history ==
Country	Date	Format	Version	Label	Ref
Various	November 23, 2021	Digital download, streaming	"Star"	RBW; Kakao Entertainment	
South Korea	December 7, 2021	CD	Studio We : Recording #3	RBW	
