= The Intersection: Belief =

- Digital and "Moon" version cover

EP by BDC
- Released: September 23, 2020
- Genre: K-pop; R&B; funk pop; future pop; trap
- Length: 17:29
- Language: Korean
- Label: Brand New Music; Kakao M

BDC chronology
| Boys Da Capo (2019) | The Intersection: Belief (2020) | The Intersection: Discovery (2021) |

Singles from The Intersection: Belief
- 1. "Shoot The Moon" Released: September 23, 2020

The Intersection: Belief (stylized in all caps) is the debut extended play by South Korean boy group BDC and the first installment from their The Intersection trilogy. It was released on September 23, 2020 by Brand New Music and distributed by Kakao M. The physical version of the EP was made available in two versions: "Moon" and "Universe". The EP itself consists of five tracks, including the lead single, "Shoot The Moon".

== Release ==
On September 4, 2020, Brand New Music released a teaser image announcing a surprise comeback for BDC with their first EP after 11 months since their debut.

On September 8–10, they released the individual concept photos consecutively. On September 14, the group concept trailer was released. On September 15–17, the concept trailer of members starting from Kim Si-hun, Hong Seong-jun, and Yun Jung-hwan was released consecutively. The next day, on September 18, Brand New Music revealed the tracklist. On September 19, they released the first music video teaser for the lead single, "Shoot The Moon". On September 20, they released a choreography trailer for "Shoot The Moon", which featuring Yeji Kim and Yumeki from 1Million Dance Studio as the choreographer. The next day, on September 21, the preview video for the EP was revealed. On September 22, the second music video teaser for "Shoot The Moon" was released.

Then, on September 23, the album was released alongside the music video for "Shoot The Moon".

== Promotion ==
BDC began to promote the single "Shoot The Moon" on weekly music chart shows the next day starting from Mnet's M Countdown, followed by KBS2's Music Bank, MBC's Show! Music Core, SBS's Inkigayo, Arirang TV's Simply K-Pop, SBS MTV's The Show, and MBC M's Show Champion.

== Track listing ==
| No. | Title | Lyrics | Music | Arrangement | Length |
|---|---|---|---|---|---|
| 1. | "Dump" | nomad; Elapse; John Napoleon | nomad; Elapse; John Napoleon | nomad; Elapse; John Napoleon | 3:39 |
| 2. | "Shoot The Moon" | OUOW; AYNA | OUOW; AYNA | OUOW | 3:12 |
| 3. | "Drowning" | EachOne; Kohway | EachOne; Kohway | EachOne | 3:42 |
| 4. | "I'll Be a Star" (별이 될게; byeori doelge) | OUOW; AYNA | OUOW; AYNA | OUOW | 3:50 |
| 5. | "Go Get Her" (featuring Lee Eun-sang) | OUOW; BOOMBASTIC; Kim Si-hun; Hong Seong-jun; Yun Jung-hwan; Lee Eun-sang | BOOMBASTIC; OUOW; Kim Si-hun; Hong Seong-jun; Yun Jung-hwan; Lee Eun-sang | BOOMBASTIC; OUOW | 3:06 |
| Total length: | | | | | 17:29 |

== Charts ==
Weekly sales chart performance for The Intersection: Belief
| Chart (2020) | Peak position |
|---|---|
| South Korean Albums (Gaon) | 9 |

Monthly sales chart performance for The Intersection: Belief
| Chart (2020) | Peak position |
|---|---|
| South Korean Albums (Gaon) | 41 |

== Release history ==
| Region | Date | Format | Label |
|---|---|---|---|
| South Korea | September 23, 2020 | CD; digital download; streaming | Brand New Music, Kakao M |
| Various | September 23, 2020 | Digital download; streaming | Brand New Music, Kakao M |
