= Kanto (rapper) =

South Korean rapper (born 1994)

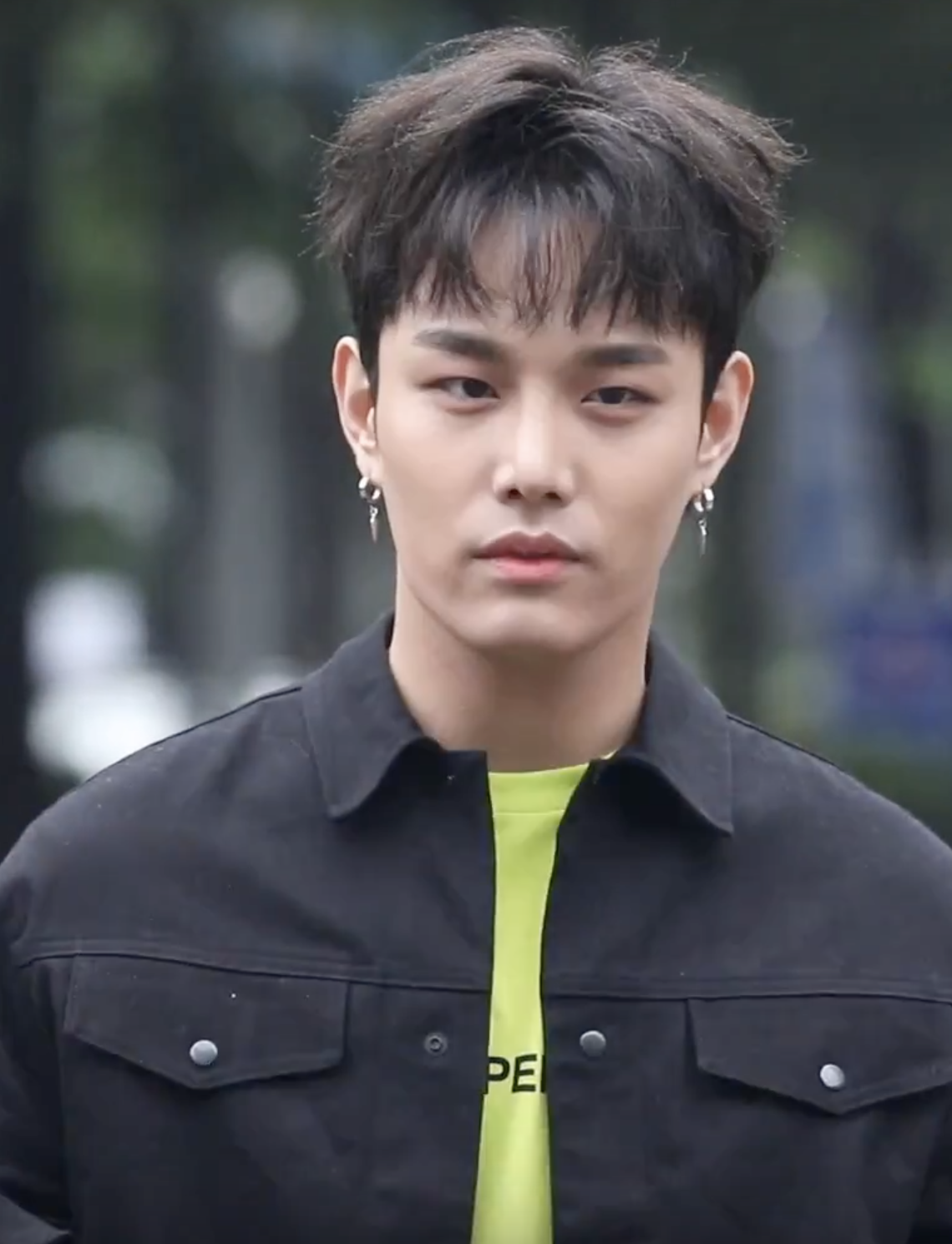
- Kanto in May 2018

Background information
- Born: Choi Kwang-ryul; May 23, 1994 (age 31); Gyeonggi Province, South Korea
- Genres: Hip hop
- Occupations: rapper; composer
- Instrument: Vocals
- Years active: 2013–present
- Label: Brand New Music

Korean name
- Hangul: 최광렬
- RR: Choe Gwangryeol
- MR: Ch'oe Kwangnyŏl

Choi Kwang-ryul (Korean: 최광렬; born May 23, 1994), known by the stage name Kanto (칸토), is a South Korean rapper and composer. He debuted as a soloist with his debut single, What You Want, on October 25, 2013. He later debuted as a member of South Korean hip hop and R&B quartet Troy in September 2014. He released his first EP, 14216, on September 27, 2016.

== Discography ==
=== Extended plays ===
Title	Album details	Peak chart positions	Sales
Title	Album details	KOR	Sales
14216	Released: September 27, 2016; Label: Brand New Music; Formats: CD, digital download	39	KOR: 489
Repetition	Released: May 15, 2018; Label: Brand New Music; Formats: CD, digital download	47	—N/a

=== Singles ===
Title	Year	Peak chart positions	Sales (DL)	Album
Title	Year	KOR	Sales (DL)	Album
As lead artist
"What You Want" (말만해) (feat. Kim Sung-kyu)	2013	21	KOR: 186,140	Non-album singles
"Before The Snow" (눈보다 먼저) (feat. As One)	2014	67	KOR: 45,002	Non-album singles
"Yosm" (요즈음) (feat. Woozi)	2016	99	KOR: 25,591	14216
"Lonely" (센척) (feat. Eddy Kim)	2016	—	—N/a	14216
"Salty" (시큰둥)	2018	—	—N/a	Repetition
"Rain Dduk" (비가 뚝)	2019	—	—N/a	Non-album singles
"Out of the Blue" (갑자기)	2020	—	—N/a	Non-album singles
"Favorite" (feat. Bumkey)	2020	—	—N/a	Non-album singles
"I'm So Fine" (feat. Kim Ho-joong)	2020	— (Note: "I'm So Fine" did not enter the Gaon Digital Chart, but appeared at no. 21 on the component Download chart.)	—N/a	Non-album singles
Collaborations
"Potato Star 2013QR3" (감자별 2013QR3) (with DinDin)	2013	—	—N/a	Potato Star 2013QR3 OST
"Call Me Noona" (누나라고 불러) (with Kang Min-hee)	2014	42	KOR: 67,814	Non-album singles
"All-Day, Everyday" (with Younha)	2014	—	KOR: 37,025	Non-album singles
"Airplane" (에어플레인) (with Hanhae)	2017	—	—N/a	Non-album singles
"WON" (with Dough-Boy)	2018	—	—N/a	Non-album singles
"Dejavu" (มีแฟนรึยัง) (with Wonderframe)	2019	—	—N/a	Non-album singles
"Playlist" with: Kim Dong-hyun (AB6IX); Lee Dae-hwi (AB6IX); Hong Seong-jun (BDC); Yun Jung-hwan (BDC); Lee Eun-sang; Gree	2021	—	—N/a	Non-album singles
"—" denotes releases that did not chart.

== Filmography ==
=== Television ===
- Show Me The Money 2 (Mnet, 2013)
- The Unit (KBS2, 2017–2018)
- Show Me the Money 10 (Mnet, 2021)
