= Lee Eun-sang (singer) =

South Korean singer (born 2002)

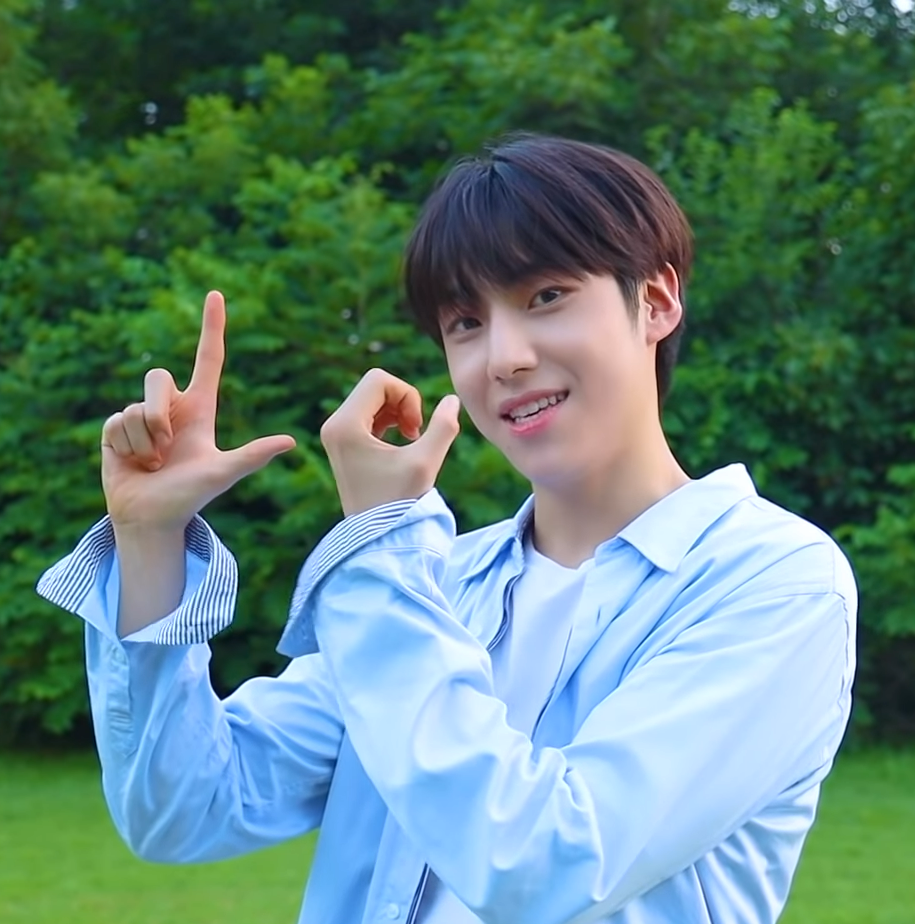
- Lee in September 2021
- Born: October 26, 2002 (age 23); Jeju Province, South Korea
- Occupations: Singer; actor
- Musical career
- Genre: K-pop
- Instrument: Vocals
- Years active: 2019–present
- Label: Brand New Music
- Formerly of: X1 • Younite

Korean name
- Hangul: 이은상
- Hanja: 李銀尙
- RR: I Eunsang
- MR: I Ŭnsang

Lee Eun-sang (Korean: 이은상; born October 26, 2002), also known by the mononym Eunsang, is a South Korean singer and actor. He is a former member of Younite and X1. He debuted as a solo artist on August 31, 2020, with his single album Beautiful Scar.

== Career ==
=== 2019: Produce X 101 and X1 ===
In 2019, Eunsang competed on the show Produce X 101 representing Brand New Music alongside Kim Si-hun, Yun Jung-hwan, and Hong Seong-jun, now of BDC. In the show's finale, he was made a member of the show's debut lineup in the 'X' position, making him a member of the group X1. He made his debut with the group on August 27, 2019, and amidst the Mnet voting manipulation scandal, the group ultimately disbanded on January 6, 2020.

=== 2020–present: Solo career and debut with Younite ===
On August 31, 2020, Eunsang made his solo debut with the single album Beautiful Scar. For the lead single, "Beautiful Scar", he collaborated with Park Woo-jin.

In October, Eunsang collaborated with former X1 groupmate Kim Woo-seok for the single "Memories".

On August 16, 2021, it was announced that Eunsang will be releasing his second single album Beautiful Sunshine and its lead single "Lemonade" on September 1.

On February 14, 2022, it was announced that Eunsang will be part of Brand New Music's upcoming boy group Younite. On April 20, 2022, he debuted as a member of Younite with the release of their first extended play Youni-Birth.

== Discography ==
=== Single albums ===
Title	Album details	Peak chart positions	Sales
Title	Album details	KOR	Sales
Beautiful Scar	Released: August 31, 2020; Label: Brand New Music; Format: CD, digital download; Track listing: 1. "Beautiful Scar" (feat. Park Woo-jin of AB6IX); 2. "Mirage; 3. "I Just Wanna Sing" (노래하고 싶어); 4. "Beautiful Scar" (Inst.)	7	KOR: 29,166
Beautiful Sunshine	Released: September 1, 2021; Label: Brand New Music; Format: CD, digital download; Track listing: 1. "Lemonade"; 2. "Undo" (feat. Yo Da-young); 3. "Stay in Here"; 4. "Lemonade" (Inst.)	15	KOR: 12,115

=== Singles ===
==== As lead artist ====
Title	Year	Peak position	Album
Title	Year	KOR	Album
"Beautiful Scar" (feat. Park Woo-jin of AB6IX)	2020	—	Beautiful Scar
"Lemonade"	2021	— (Note: "Lemonade" did not enter the Gaon Digital Chart, but peaked at number 142 on the Gaon Download Chart.)	Beautiful Sunshine
"—" denotes releases that did not chart or were not released in that region.

==== Other releases ====
Title	Year	Peak position	Album
Title	Year	KOR	Album
Collaborations
"Memories" (with Kim Woo-seok)	2020	— (Note: "Memories" did not enter the Gaon Digital Chart, but peaked at number 45 and 86 on the Gaon Download Chart and the Gaon BGM Chart, respectively.)	Non-album single
"Chandelier" (샹들리에) (with AB6IX and BDC)	2020	—	Brandnew Year 2020 'Brandnew Up'
"Hole In Your Face" (얼굴 뚫어지겠다) (with BDC)	2021	—	Ten Project Part.2
Promotional
"Playlist" (with various artists (Note: Kim Dong-hyun (AB6IX), Lee Dae-hwi (AB6IX), Hong Seong-jun (BDC), Yun Jung-hwan (BDC), Kanto, Gree))	2021	—	Non-album single
Soundtrack appearances
"Starry Night" (그때 다시 빛나요 우리)	2020	—	Let Me Off The Earth OST
"—" denotes releases that did not chart or were not released in that region.

=== Guest appearances ===
List of non-single guest appearances with other performing artist(s)
Title	Year	Other artist(s)	Album
"Go Get Her"	2020	BDC	The Intersection: Belief
"To U"	2021	—N/a	Idol: The Coup OST Part 6
"Tonight" (오늘 밤)	2021	Kim Min-kyu, Hong Eun-ki (featuring Green)	Idol: The Coup OST Part 6

== Filmography ==
=== Television series ===
Year	Title	Role	Notes	Ref.
2021	Idol: The Coup	Dan	Supporting role	

=== Web series ===
Year	Title	Network	Role	Notes	Ref.
2020	Let Me Off The Earth	Naver TV Cast / Playlist	Ji-woo's brother	Cameo (Episode 11)	
2021	Part-Time Melo	KT-Seezn	Kang Ha-woon		

=== Television shows ===
Year	Title	Network	Role	Notes	Ref.
2019	Produce X 101	Mnet	Contestant	Finished in X/11th place	

=== Music video appearances ===
Year	Song title	Artist	Ref.
2020	"February 29" (2월 29일)	As One	

== Awards and nominations ==
Name of the award ceremony, year presented, award category, nominee(s) of the award, and the result of the nomination
Award ceremony	Year	Category	Nominee(s)	Result	Ref.
Asia Artist Awards	2021	Male Solo Singer Popularity Award	Lee Eun-sang	Nominated	
Golden Disc Awards	2021	Rookie Artist of the Year	Lee Eun-sang	Nominated	
