= One (Onewe album) =

Studio album by Onewe
- Released: May 26, 2020
- Genre: Rock
- Length: 42:09
- Language: Korean
- Labels: RBW; Stone Music Entertainment

Onewe chronology
3/4 (2020)	One (2020)	Studio We: Recording (2020)

Singles from One
- 1. "Reminisce About All" Released: May 13, 2019; 2. "Regulus" Released: August 29, 2019; 3. "Q" Released: April 2, 2020; 4. "End of Spring" Released: May 26, 2020

One is the first studio album by the South Korean band Onewe. The album was released by RBW on May 26, 2020, and distributed by Stone Music Entertainment. It consists of a total of 12 tracks, including the band's previous digital single albums 1/4, 2/4 and 3/4 along with four new tracks, including the single "End of Spring" and its rock version.

== Track listing ==
One track listing
No.	Title	Lyrics	Music	Arrangement	Length
1.	"Crazy Good" (미쳤다 미쳤어)	CyA, Yonghoon	CyA, Jeon Da-woon (RBW), Yonghoon	Jeon Da-woon, CyA	3:17
2.	"End of Spring" (나의 계절 봄은 끝났다)	Kim Do-hoon (RBW), Seo Yong-bae (RBW), CyA	Kim Do-hoon (RBW), Seo Yong-bae (RBW), CyA	Kim Do-hoon (RBW), Seo Yong-bae (RBW), Jeon Da-woon (RBW)	3:29
3.	"Feeling Good" (2019 ver.)	Yonghoon, Kanghyun, Harin, Dongmyeong, CyA	Yonghoon, Kanghyun, Harin, Dongmyeong, CyA	Jeon Da-woon (RBW), Kanghyun, Harin, CyA	2:42
4.	"Love Me" (내가 처음 만져본 강아지)	Yonghoon, CyA	Kim Do-hoon (RBW), Yonghoon, Kanghyun	Kim Do-hoon (RBW), Jeon Da-woon (RBW)	3:10
5.	"Q" (featuring Hwasa; 모르겠다고)	CyA, Kim Jae-hyun	CyA, Jeon Da-woon (RBW), Yonghoon, Kim Jae-hyun, Noden	Jeon Da-woon (RBW), Noden	3:30
6.	"Regulus" (야행성)	Kanghyun, CyA, Heungeul	Kanghyun, CyA, Jeon Da-woon (RBW)	Jeon Da-woon (RBW), Kanghyun	3:42
7.	"If"	Yonghoon, CyA	Yonghoon, Jeon Da-woon (RBW), CyA	Jeon Da-woon (RBW), Yonghoon, CyA	3:32
8.	"0&4" (공과 사)	Kanghyun, Yonghoon, CyA	Kanghyun, Yonghoon, Jeon Da-woon (RBW)	Jeon Da-woon (RBW), Kanghyun, CyA	3:30
9.	"Ring on My Ears" (귀걸이가 나를 때리게)	CyA	CyA, Jeon Da-woon (RBW)	Jeon Da-woon (RBW), CyA, Kanghyun	3:45
10.	"Reminisce About All" (다 추억)	Yonghoon	Yonghoon, Jeon Da-woon (RBW)	Jeon Da-woon (RBW), Yonghoon	4:12
11.	"Ring on My Ears" (remix; 귀걸이가 나를 때리게)	CyA	CyA, Jeon Da-woon (RBW)	Jeon Da-woon (RBW), CyA	3:44
12.	"End of Spring" (나의 계절 봄은 끝났다; rock ver.)	Kim Do-hoon (RBW), Seo Yong-bae (RBW), CyA	Kim Do-hoon (RBW), Seo Yong-bae (RBW), CyA	Kim Do-hoon (RBW), Seo Yong-bae (RBW), Jeon Da-woon (RBW), Kanghyun	3:29
Total length:					42:09

== Charts ==
Chart performance for One
Chart (2023)	Peak position
South Korean Albums (Gaon)	13

== Release history ==
Release history and formats for One
Country	Date	Format	Label	Ref.
South Korea	May 26, 2020	CD, digital download, streaming	RBW; Stone Music Entertainment	
Various	May 26, 2020	CD, digital download, streaming	RBW; Stone Music Entertainment	
