= The Intersection: Discovery =

- Digital and "Reality" version cover

EP by BDC
- Released: March 8, 2021
- Genre: K-pop; R&B; electropop; future bass
- Length: 16:55
- Language: Korean
- Label: Brand New Music; Kakao

BDC chronology
The Intersection: Belief (2020)	The Intersection: Discovery (2021)	The Intersection: Contact (2021)

Singles from The Intersection: Discovery
- 1. "Moon Rider" Released: March 8, 2021

The Intersection: Discovery (stylized in all caps) is the second extended play by South Korean boy group BDC and the second installment from their The Intersection trilogy. It was released on March 8, 2021 by Brand New Music and distributed by Kakao Entertainment. The physical version of the EP is available in two versions: "Reality" and "Dreaming". The EP itself consists of five tracks, including the lead single, "Moon Rider" and its instrumental.

== Release ==
On February 22, 2021, Brand New Music announced with a teaser image that BDC would make a comeback with a new album in two weeks.

On February 24–26, Brand New Music released the concept photos consecutively. Three days later, on March 1, they released the tracklist, which revealed "Moon Rider" as the lead single. On March 2, the lyric teaser photo for "Moon Rider" was released. On March 3, they released the first music video teaser for "Moon Rider". The next day, on March 4, the preview video for the EP was revealed. On March 5, they released the second music video teaser for "Moon Rider".

Then, on March 8, the album was released alongside the music video for "Moon Rider".

== Promotion ==
On March 7, 2021, BDC held a private showcase at Starfield COEX Mall.

They promoted the single "Moon Rider" at Mnet's M Countdown, KBS2's Music Bank, MBC's Show! Music Core, SBS's Inkigayo, SBS MTV's The Show, MBC M's Show Champion, and Arirang TV's Simply K-Pop.

On April 10, 2021, BDC held a special fan meeting at the seventh floor of CGV Hongdae.

== Track listing ==
No.	Title	Lyrics	Music	Arrangement	Length
1.	"Chemical"	Robbin; ZWOO; Kosmos; Ish Hokhmah	Robbin; ZWOO; Kosmos; Ish Hokhmah	Robbin; ZWOO; Kosmos; Ish Hokhmah	3:12
2.	"Moon Rider"	OUOW; BOOMBASTIC	BOOMBASTIC; OUOW	BOOMBASTIC; OUOW	3:11
3.	"Fine" (꽃이 피네; kkochi pine [lit. "The flower is blooming"])	OUOW; Kim Si-hun	OUOW	OUOW	3:34
4.	"Love in the Air" (공기가 달라; gonggiga dalla [lit. "The air feels different"])	OUOW; Kim Si-hun	OUOW	OUOW	3:47
5.	"Moon Rider" (Inst.)		BOOMBASTIC; OUOW	BOOMBASTIC; OUOW	3:11
Total length:					16:55

== Charts ==
Weekly sales chart performance for The Intersection: Discovery
Chart (2021)	Peak position
South Korean Albums (Gaon)	11

Monthly sales chart performance for The Intersection: Discovery
Chart (2021)	Peak position
South Korean Albums (Gaon)	66

== Release history ==
Region	Date	Format	Label
South Korea	March 8, 2021	CD; digital download; streaming	Brand New Music, Kakao
Various	March 8, 2021	Digital download; streaming	Brand New Music, Kakao
