= Planet Nine: Alter Ego =

EP by Onewe
- Released: June 16, 2021
- Recorded: 2021
- Genre: Rock
- Length: 22:08
- Language: Korean
- Label: RBW; Kakao Entertainment

Onewe chronology
Memory: Illusion (2020)	Planet Nine: Alter Ego (2021)	Studio We: Recording #2 (2021)

Singles from Planet Nine: Alter Ego
- 1. "Rain To Be" Released: June 16, 2021

Music videos
- "Rain To Be" on YouTube
- "Veronica" on YouTube
- "AuRoRa" on YouTube

Planet Nine: Alter Ego is the first extended play by the South Korean band Onewe. The album was released by RBW on June 16, 2021, and distributed by Kakao Entertainment. It consists of seven songs, including the lead single "Rain To Be".

== Background and release ==
On January 22, 2021, a special teaser was released for Onewe's Studio We : Live #6 "Onewe? or Onewe!" online concert revealing the band's new unreleased song "Aurora". The song was unveiled through a live performance at the concert on January 23 and 24.

On May 31, RBW posted a teaser announcing Onewe's first EP Planet Nine: Alter Ego which would be released on June 16 at 6pm KST.

On June 3, the full track list was revealed with a total of seven songs, self-written and composed by the band with all five members participating in the song production, including the lead single "Rain to Be" and the official release of "Aurora".

On June 16, the EP was released along with a music video for "Rain to Be", following which music videos for the songs "Veronica" and "Aurora" from the EP were also subsequently released on June 28 and July 2 respectively.

== Track listing ==
No.	Title	Lyrics	Music	Arrangement	Length
1.	"Intro: Spaceship" (Intro: 우주선)	CyA	CyA	CyA, Kanghyun, Harin	1:00
2.	"Rain to Be" (비를 몰고 오는 소년)	Kanghyun, CyA	Kanghyun, Jeon Da-woon (RBW), CyA	Jeon Da-woon (RBW), Kanghyun	3:15
3.	"Aurora"	Kanghyun, Yonghoon, CyA	Kanghyun, Jeon Da-woon (RBW)	Jeon Da-woon (RBW), Kanghyun, CocoDubuPapa (RBW)	3:41
4.	"Logo"	Yonghoon, Harin, Dongmyeong, CyA	Yonghoon, Kanghyun, CyA, CocoDubuPapa (RBW)	CocoDubuPapa (RBW), Yonghoon, Kanghyun, CyA	3:13
5.	"A.I." (로보트도 인간에게 감정을 느낀다)	CyA, Yonghoon, Dongmyeong	CyA, Yonghoon, Jeon Da-woon (RBW)	Jeon Da-woon (RBW), CyA, Kanghyun	4:07
6.	"Veronica" (베로니가의 섬)	CyA, Yonghoon	CyA, Yonghoon, Kanghyun, Jeon Da-woon (RBW)	Jeon Da-woon (RBW), CyA, Kanghyun	3:19
7.	"Cosmos" (천체)	Kanghyun, CyA	Kanghyun, CocoDubuPapa (RBW)	CocoDubuPapa (RBW), Kanghyun	3:30
Total length:					22:08

== Accolades ==
Year-end lists
Publisher	Year	Listicle	Work	Placement	Ref.
MTV	2021	MTV Best Kpop Bsides of 2021	"Aurora"	1	
Harper's Bazaar	2021	The Top 15 K-Pop Albums of 2021	Planet Nine: Alter Ego	10	

== Charts ==
Chart (2021)	Peak position
South Korean Albums (Gaon)	12

== Release history ==
Country	Date	Format	Label	Ref
South Korea	June 16, 2021	CD, digital download, streaming	RBW; Kakao Entertainment	
Various	June 16, 2021	CD, digital download, streaming	RBW; Kakao Entertainment	
