= BDC (group) =

South Korean boy band

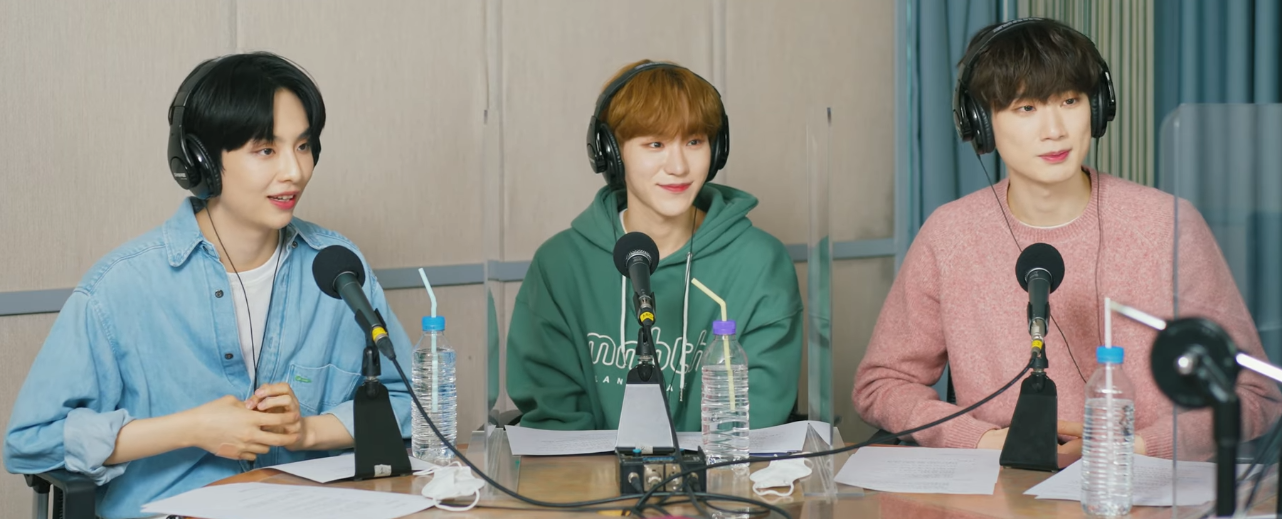
- BDC in March 2021; Left to right: Kim Si-hun, Hong Seong-jun, and Yun Jung-hwan

Background information
- Origin: Seoul, South Korea
- Genres: K-pop
- Years active: 2019–2023
- Labels: Brand New Music
- Members: Kim Si-hun; Hong Seong-jun; Yun Jung-hwan
- Website: brandnewmusic.co.kr/portfolio-item/bdc

BDC (Korean: 비디씨, acronym for Boys Da Capo) was a South Korean trio formed by Brand New Music in 2019. The trio consists of Kim Si-hun, Hong Seong-jun, and Yun Jung-hwan. The group debuted on October 29, 2019, with the single album Boys Da Capo.

== History ==
=== Pre-debut ===
The trio represented Brand New Music as a quartet alongside Lee Eun-sang in Mnet's survival reality show Produce X 101. Following the show's finale, none of the members earned a spot in the consequent project group, X1. Kim Si-hun ranked 27th in the third elimination round overall, while Hong Seong-jun and Yun Jung-hwan placed 51st and 35th in the second elimination round, respectively.

On October 2, 2019, the trio starred their own reality show named Boys Don't Cry, which was aired on Piki Pictures for four weeks. The show displayed their preparation before debuting, where they had to decide a name for their future group and do a street performance.

=== 2019–2021: Debut with Boys Da Capo and The Intersection series ===
On October 16, 2019, a teaser image of the trio was released, revealing "BDC" as the name of the group and their debut date. About two weeks later, on October 29, BDC released their special single album Boys Da Capo with the lead single "Remember Me", in which member Kim Si-hun participated in the choreography composition. Then, on November 24, they held their first fan meeting titled "BDC 1st FAN MEETING: REMEMBER YOU" at Yonsei University's Centennial Hall.

On September 23, 2020, BDC released their first EP The Intersection: Belief with "Shoot The Moon" serving as the lead single. Despite being the second release of the group, this EP was considered as their official debut.

On March 8, 2021, BDC released their second EP The Intersection: Discovery with "Moon Rider" serving as the lead single. On May 9, they held an online fan meeting titled "2021 BDC ONLINE FANMEETING 'al Fine'" through the video platform FC Live. On June 30, BDC released their third EP The Intersection: Contact with "Moonlight" serving as the lead single. On August 10, BDC released the special single "Moon Walker". The song, which was co-written by member Kim Sihun, was intended to be the finale or epilogue of "The Intersection" series. It was recorded at the same time as the lead single from the previous EP. On August 18, they released the single "Stop Now" which was produced by Bumkey as a part of the cyberbullying prevention campaign from the Blue Tree Foundation. On October 1, BDC released their debut Japanese single "Moon Walker" which consists of the Japanese versions of "Moon Walker" and "Moon Rider" digitally.

=== 2022-2023: Blue Sky and departure from Brand New Music ===
On June 15, 2022, BDC had their first comeback approximately after 10 months with the single album Blue Sky and its title track.

On February 15, 2023, in the first episode of the JTBC's music reality competition show Peak Time, it was revealed that BDC was one of the participants, where they went under the pseudonym Team 18:00 as it was one of the rules of the show where they had to perform under a new stage name assigned to them. On March 22, in the seventh episode of the show, BDC got eliminated on the first elimination round and their group's name was finally disclosed. The song "Thunder (Urr)", that was supposed to be performed by them on the third round of the show, was released under their actual name on the next day with other participants' songs.

On August 18, 2023, Brand New Music announced that the trio would part ways with the label after the release of the single "Rest" on August 26.

== Members ==
- Kim Si-hun (김시훈)
- Yun Jung-hwan (윤정환)
- Hong Seong-jun (홍성준)

== Discography ==
=== Extended plays ===
List of extended plays, showing selected details, selected chart positions, and sales figures
Title	Details	Peak chart positions	Sales
Title	Details	KOR	Sales
The Intersection: Belief	Released: September 23, 2020; Label: Brand New Music; Formats: CD, digital download, streaming	9	KOR: 14,416
The Intersection: Discovery	Released: March 8, 2021; Label: Brand New Music; Formats: CD, digital download, streaming	11	KOR: 10,210
The Intersection: Contact	Released: June 30, 2021; Label: Brand New Music; Formats: CD, digital download, streaming	13	KOR: 9,256

=== Single albums ===
List of single albums, showing selected details, selected chart positions, and sales figures
Title	Details	Peak chart positions	Sales
Title	Details	KOR	Sales
Boys Da Capo	Released: October 29, 2019; Label: Brand New Music; Formats: CD, digital download, streaming	10	KOR: 11,916
Blue Sky	Released: June 15, 2022; Label: Brand New Music; Formats: CD, digital download, streaming	33	—

=== Singles ===
Title	Year	Album
As lead artist
"Remember Me" (기억되고 싶어)	2019	Boys Da Capo
"Shoot the Moon"	2020	The Intersection: Belief
"Moon Rider" (Note: The Japanese version of "Moon Rider" was included in BDC's debut Japanese single Moon Walker.)	2021	The Intersection: Discovery
"Moonlight"	2021	The Intersection: Contact
"Moon Walker"	2021	Non-album single
"Blue Sky" (어느 밤)	2022	Blue Sky
"Rest" (쉼표)	2023	Non-album singles
"Nostalgia" (하루 비) (with Boombastic)	2023	Non-album singles
Promotional
"Stop Now" (이제는 멈춰)	2021	Non-album single

==== Collaborations ====
Title	Year	Album
"Melting" (with AB6IX, Kang Min-hee, Kanto, and Yo Da-young)	2019	Brandnew Year 2019 'Do That Brandnew Thing'
"Chandelier" (샹들리에) (with AB6IX and Lee Eun-sang)	2020	Brandnew Year 2020 'Brandnew Up'
"Hole In Your Face" (얼굴 뚫어지겠다) (with Lee Eun-sang)	2021	Ten Project Part.2
"Happy Brandnew Year" (with AB6IX, Bumkey, Gree, Han Dong-geun, Hanhae, Kanto, Lee Eun-sang, Vincent Blue, Yang Da-il)	2021	Brandnew Year 2021 'TEN: The Ever New Brandnew'
"Hugs" (with AB6IX, Younite)	2022	Brandnew Year 2022 'Brandnew V1s1on'

== Filmography ==
=== Television series ===
Year	Title	Role	Note(s)	Ref.
2021	Let Me Be Your Knight	Members of idol group Blue Moon	Extra, Ep.4-5	

=== Television shows ===
Year	Title	Note(s)	Ref.
2023	Peak Time	Eliminated at the first eliminated round	

=== Web shows ===
Year	Title	Note(s)	Ref.
2019	Boys Don't Cry	Pre-debut reality show	
