= The Intersection: Contact =

- Digital cover

EP by BDC
- Released: June 30, 2021
- Genre: K-pop; electropop; europop; hip hop
- Length: 16:58
- Language: Korean
- Label: Brand New Music; Kakao

BDC chronology
The Intersection: Discovery (2021)	The Intersection: Contact (2021)	Blue Sky (2022)

Singles from The Intersection: Contact
- 1. "Moonlight" Released: June 30, 2021

The Intersection: Contact (stylized in all caps) is the third extended play by South Korean boy band BDC and the final release from their The Intersection trilogy. It was released on June 30, 2021, by Brand New Music and distributed by Kakao Entertainment. The EP consists of five tracks, including the lead single, "Moonlight" and its instrumental. The physical version of the EP is available in five versions: photobook type which consists of "Contact" and "Element" and jewel case type which consists of three versions that are made especially for each member.

== Release ==
On June 11, 2021, Brand New Music released a set of individual teaser photos and the release date for the third EP The Intersection: Contact. On June 15, they released a group teaser photo with the phrase "they contact each other through their own moon" written on it. On June 16–18, they released three sets of the concept photos for The Intersection: Contact. On June 22, the tracklist for the EP was released, revealing "Moonlight" as the lead single. On June 23, the lyric teaser video for "Moonlight" was released. On June 24, the first music video teaser for "Moonlight" was released. On June 25, they released the preview video for the EP. They released the second music video teaser for "Moonlight" on June 29.

On June 30, they released The Intersection: Contact along with the music video for "Moonlight".

== Promotion ==
BDC promoted the single "Moonlight" at Mnet's M Countdown, KBS2's Music Bank, MBC's Show! Music Core, SBS's Inkigayo, and SBS MTV's The Show.

== Track listing ==
No.	Title	Lyrics	Music	Arrangement	Length
1.	"Mystery Circle"	OUOW	OUOW	OUOW	03:22
2.	"Moonlight"	Kim Tae-wan; BOOMBASTIC	BOOMBASTIC; Kim Tae-wan	BOOMBASTIC; Kim Tae-wan	03:23
3.	"Mirage" (신기루; singiru)	OUOW; Taeseok; Kim Si-hun	OUOW; Taeseok	OUOW	03:12
4.	"Love, Trust, and Destiny" (너와 나의 공간; nowa nae gonggan [lit. "The space between you and me"])	OUOW	OUOW	OUOW	03:38
5.	"Moonlight" (Inst.)		BOOMBASTIC; Kim Tae-wan	BOOMBASTIC; Kim Tae-wan	03:23
Total length:					16:58

== Charts ==
Weekly sales chart performance for The Intersection: Contact
Chart (2021)	Peak position
South Korean Albums (Gaon)	13

Monthly sales chart performance for The Intersection: Contact
Chart (2021)	Peak position
South Korean Albums (Gaon)	65

== Release history ==
Region	Date	Format	Label
South Korea	June 30, 2021	CD; digital download; streaming	Brand New Music, Kakao
Various	June 30, 2021	Digital download; streaming	Brand New Music, Kakao
