= Memory: Illusion =

Single album by Onewe
- Released: December 11, 2020
- Genre: Rock
- Language: Korean
- Label: RBW; Kakao M

Onewe chronology
Studio We: Recording (2020)	Memory: Illusion (2020)	Planet Nine: Alter Ego (2021)

Singles from Memory: Illusion
- 1. "A Book in Memory" Released: December 11, 2020

Music videos
- "A book in Memory" on YouTube

Memory: Illusion is the first physical single album by the South Korean band Onewe. The album was released by RBW on December 11, 2020, and distributed by Kakao M. It consists of four tracks, including the lead single "A Book in Memory".

== Background and release ==
On November 29, 2020, RBW posted a schedule plan announcing the release of Onewe's first single album Memory: Illusion on released on December 11 at 6pm KST.

== Track listing ==
No.	Title	Lyrics	Music	Arrangement	Length
1.	"Trauma (Aquarium)"	CyA, Yonghoon	CyA, Yonghoon, CocoDubuPapa (RBW)	CocoDubuPapa (RBW), Kanghyun, Harin, CyA	3:56
2.	"A Book in Memory" (기억 속 한 권의 책)	Yonghoon, CyA	Yonghoon, Jeon Da-woon (RBW)	Jeon Da-woon (RBW), Yonghoon	3:57
3.	"Eraser" (기억 세탁소)	Jeon Da-woon (RBW), CyA, Yonghoon	Jeon Da-woon (RBW), CyA	Jeon Da-woon (RBW)	3:56
4.	"A Book in Memory" (기억 속 한 권의 책) (Inst.)		Yonghoon, Jeon Da-woon (RBW)	Jeon Da-woon (RBW), Yonghoon
Total length:					15:47

== Charts ==
Chart (2021)	Peak position
South Korean Albums (Gaon)	16

== Release history ==
Country	Date	Format	Label	Ref
Various	December 11, 2020	Digital download, streaming	RBW; Kakao M	
South Korea	December 11, 2020	CD	RBW	
