= Younite =

South Korean boy band

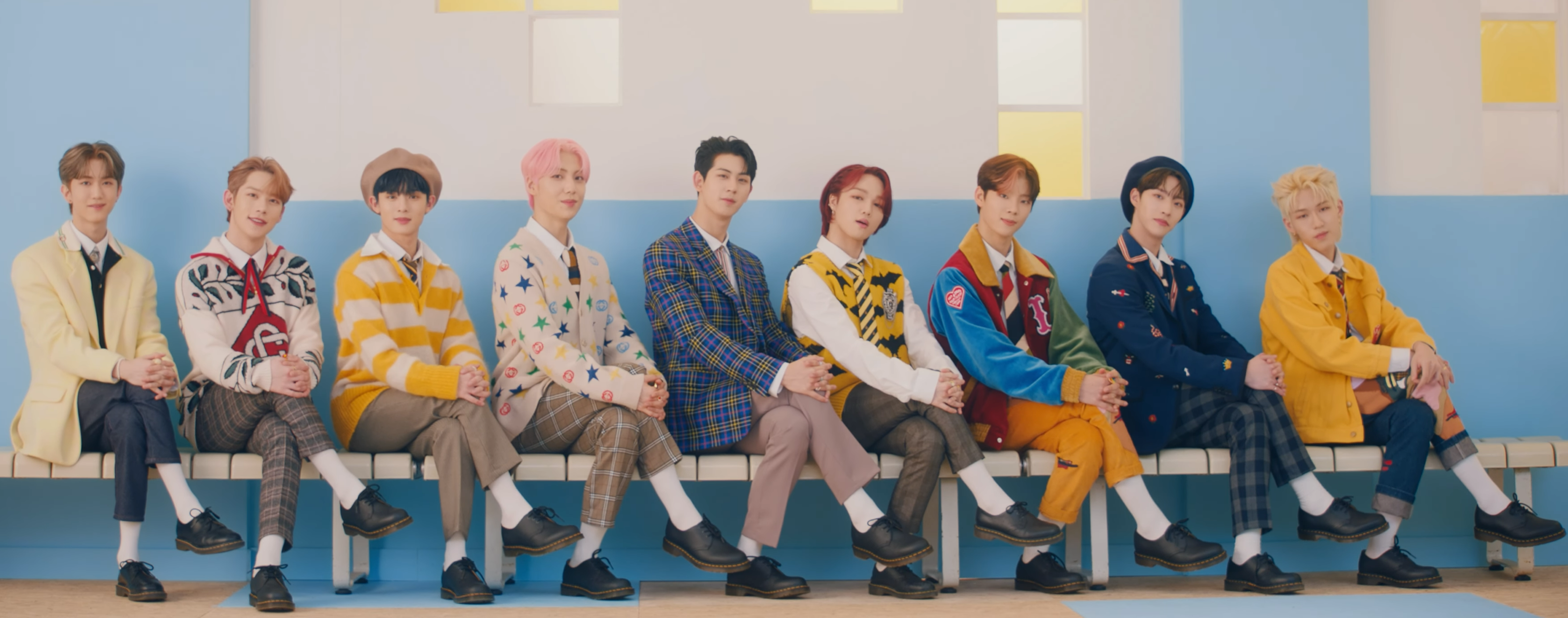
- Younite in April 2022; L–R: Kyungmun, Steve, Woono, Eunsang (former member), Hyungseok, Eunho, Sion, Hyunseung (former member), and Dey

Background information
- Origin: Seoul, South Korea
- Genre: K-pop
- Years active: 2022–present
- Label: Brand New
- Members: Eunho; Steve; Hyungseok; Woono; Dey; Kyungmun; Sion
- Past members: Hyunseung; Eunsang
- Website: brandnewmusic.co.kr/younite

Younite (Korean: 유나이트; RR: Yunaiteu; stylized in all caps) is a South Korean boy band formed by Brand New Music. The band consists of seven members: Eunho, Steve, Hyungseok, Woono, Dey, Kyungmun, and Sion. Younite was originally a nine-piece ensemble; member Hyunseung left the group in July 2024 and Eunsang left the group in June 2026. They debuted on April 20, 2022, with their first extended play (EP) Youni-Birth.

== Name ==
Younite means "YOU and I: we are connected".

== History ==
=== Pre-debut ===
In 2019, Eunsang competed on the show Produce X 101 representing Brand New Music alongside Kim Si-hun, Yun Jung-hwan, and Hong Seong-jun, now of BDC. In the show's finale, he was made a member of the show's debut lineup in the 'X' position, making him a member of the group X1. He made his debut with the group on August 27, 2019, and amidst the Mnet voting manipulation scandal, the group ultimately disbanded on January 6, 2020.

On August 31, 2020, Eunsang made his solo debut with the single album Beautiful Scar. For the lead single, "Beautiful Scar", he collaborated with Park Woo-jin. In October, Eunsang collaborated with former X1 groupmate Kim Woo-seok for the single "Memories". On August 16, 2021, it was announced that Eunsang will be releasing his second single album Beautiful Sunshine and its lead single "Lemonade" on September 1.

In 2021, Kyungmun competed on the show Loud. Kyungmun represented JYP Entertainment alongside Lee Gye-hun and Amaru. He was eliminated in the fifth round.

=== 2022–present: Debut with Youni-Birth, Youni-Q, Youni-On, Bit: Pt. 1, Hyunseung and Eunsang's departure ===
On March 18, Brand New Music announced that Younite will make their debut with their first extended play (EP), Youni-Birth on April 20, 2022.

On July 25, Younite released their second extended play, Youni-Q.

On October 31, the group released their third extended play, Youni-On. including their lead single "Bad Cupid", However, on October 30, the label announced the cancellation of the comeback showcase due to the national mourning period following the Itaewon Halloween crowd crush incident on the 29th.

On April 25, 2023, the group announced their fourth extended play, Light: BIT Part.1, which was released on May 17 of that year, with the lead single "Waterfall".

On July 2, 2024, Brand New announced that Hyunseung had departed from the group due to personal reasons. Younite would continue to promote as an eight-member group thereafter.

On June 30, it was announced that Eunsang would be leaving YOUNITE due to health and would be preparing for new solo releases.

== Members ==
Adapted from their official website.

Current

- Eunho (은호)
- Steve (스티브)
- Hyungseok (형석)
- Woono (우노)
- Dey (데이)
- Kyungmun (경문)
- Sion (시온)

Former

- Eunsang (은상)
- Hyunseung (현승)

== Discography ==
=== Extended plays ===
List of extended plays, showing selected details, selected chart positions, and sales figures
| Title | Details | Peak chart positions | | Sales |
| Title | Details | KOR | JPN | Sales |
|---|---|---|---|---|
| Youni-Birth | Released: April 20, 2022; Label: Brand New Music; Formats: CD, digital download, streaming; Track listing: 1. "Youni-Birth"; 2. "1 of 9"; 3. "Everybody" (feat. DJ Juice); 4. "Ring Ring Ring"; 5. "Oddysey"; 6. "I Got the Feeling" (그런 느낌이 와) | 8 | — | KOR: 28,756 |
| Youni-Q | Released: July 25, 2022; Label: Brand New Music; Formats: CD, digital download, streaming; Track listing: 1. "Traveler"; 2. "Aviator"; 3. "Swish"; 4. "Come Around"; 5. "I Like You" (널 좋아해) | 10 | 47 | KOR: 47,017; JPN: 1,119 |
| Youni-On | Released: October 31, 2022; Label: Brand New Music; Formats: CD, digital download, streaming; Track listing: 1. "Time's Up"; 2. "Bad Cupid"; 3. "Power"; 4. "99%"; 5. "Pump Your Sneakers"; 6. "Bestie" | 4 | — | KOR: 61,534 |
| 빛: Bit Part.1 | Released: May 17, 2023; Label: Brand New Music; Formats: CD, digital download, streaming; Track listing: 1. "Icy"; 2. "Waterfall"; 3. "Look at the TV"; 4. "TRiP"; 5. "Slogan" | 8 | 49 | KOR: 78,979; JPN: 1,033 |
| 빛: Bit Part.2 | Released: October 17, 2023; Label: Brand New Music; Formats: CD, digital download, streaming; Track listing: 1. "Chili Pop"; 2. "Love It"; 3. "F!zzy Soda Love"; 4. "Cupcake"; 5. "A Star Called You" | 4 | — | KOR: 90,015 |
| Another | Released: May 1, 2024; Label: Brand New Music; Formats: CD, digital download, streaming; Track listing: 1. "How We Do"; 2. "Geekin"; 3. "Poco Loco"; 4. "One+Won"; 5. "OMH (Out My Head)" | 9 | — | KOR: 105,377 |
| Youni-T | Released: April 23, 2025; Label: Brand New Music; Formats: CD, digital download, streaming; Track listing: 1. "Amie Song"; 2. "Rock Steady"; 3. "Gasoline"; 4. "Who's Next?" (Hyungseok, Dey, Kyungmun); 5. "Twilight Rush" (Eunho, Steve); 6. "Miracle Day" (Eunsang, Woono, Sion); 7. "Good to Go" | 5 | — | KOR: 140,199 |
| Inyun Pt. 1 | Released: May 12, 2026; Label: Para Music; Formats: CD, digital download, streaming; Track listing: 1. "Parallel"; 2. "Pose!" (姿態); 3. "Savior"; 4. "Nothing"; 5. "So Alive" | 8 | — | KOR: 55,224 |

=== Singles ===
List of singles, showing year released, selected chart positions, and name of the album
| Title | Year | Peak chart positions | Album |
| Title | Year | KOR Down. | Album |
|---|---|---|---|
| "1 of 9" | 2022 | 113 | Youni-Birth |
| "Everybody" | 2022 | — | Youni-Birth |
| "Aviator" | 2022 | 155 | Youni-Q |
| "Bad Cupid" | 2022 | — | Youni-On |
| "Waterfall" | 2023 | 168 | (빛) Bit: Pt. 1 |
| "Love It" | 2023 | 144 | (빛): Bit Part.2 |
| "Geekin" | 2024 | 170 | Another |
| "Taste" | 2024 | 130 | Y |
| "Rock Steady" | 2025 | 125 | Youni-T |
| "Bomba" | 2025 | — | Bomba |
| "Pose!" | 2026 | 177 | Inyun Part.1 |
"—" denotes a recording that did not chart or was not released in that territory.

== Awards and nominations ==
Name of the award ceremony, year presented, award category, nominee(s) of the award, and the result of the nomination
| Award ceremony | Year | Category | Nominee(s)/work(s) | Result | Ref. |
|---|---|---|---|---|---|
| Asia Artist Awards | 2022 | DCM Popularity Award – Singer | Younite | Nominated | |
| Asia Artist Awards | 2022 | IdolPlus Popularity Award – Singer | Younite | Nominated | |
| Brand of the Year Awards | 2023 | Rookie of the Year – Male | Younite | Nominated | |
| Brand of Customer Loyalty Awards | 2023 | Male Rookie Idol Award | Younite | Nominated | |
| Genie Music Awards | 2022 | Best Male Rookie Award | Younite | Nominated | |
| Hanteo Music Awards | 2023 | Best New Male Artist | Younite | Nominated | |
| Hanteo Music Awards | 2024 | Emerging Artist | Younite | Nominated | |
| Hanteo Music Awards | 2025 | Emerging Artist | Younite | Nominated | |
| MAMA Awards | 2022 | Best New Male Artist | Younite | Nominated | |
| MAMA Awards | 2022 | Artist of the Year | Younite | Longlisted | |
| MAMA Awards | 2024 | Fans' Choice Top 10 – Male | Younite | Nominated | |
| Seoul Music Awards | 2023 | Rookie of the Year | Younite | Nominated | |
| Seoul Music Awards | 2023 | Popularity Award | Younite | Nominated | |
| Seoul Music Awards | 2023 | K-Wave Popularity Award | Younite | Nominated | |
| Seoul Music Awards | 2025 | Rising Star Award | Younite | Nominated | |
