= The KingDom =

South Korean boy band

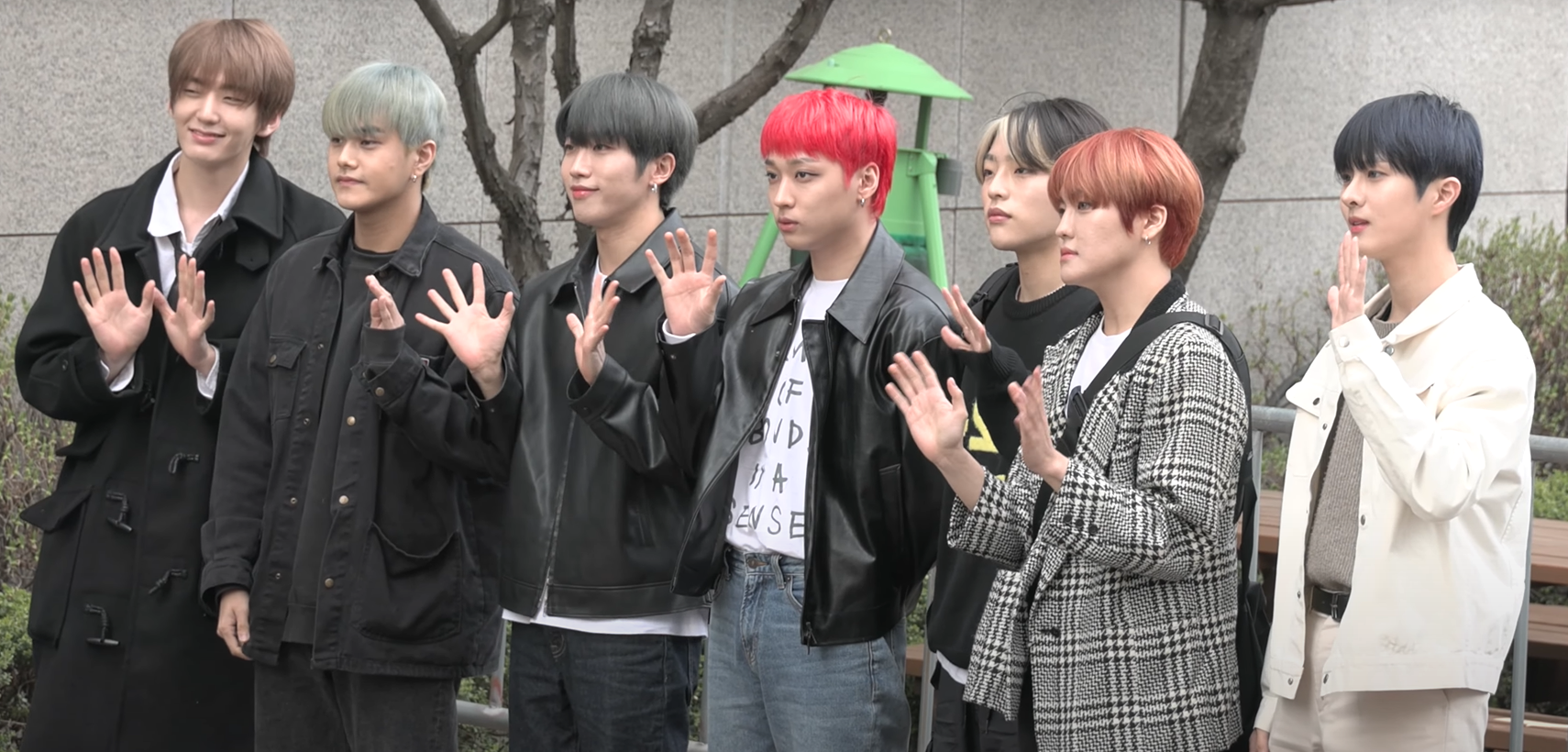
- Kingdom in March 2023; From left to right: Hwon, Jahan, Dann, Arthur, Mujin, Louis, Ivan

Background information
- Also known as: Kingdom (2021–2024)
- Origin: Seoul, South Korea
- Genre: K-pop
- Years active: 2021–present
- Label: GF Entertainment
- Members: Dann; Arthur; Mujin; Louis; Ivan; Jahan
- Past members: Chiwoo; Hwon
- Website: gfent.co.kr/TheKingDom

The KingDom (Korean: 더킹덤), formerly known as Kingdom (킹덤), is a South Korean boy band formed and managed by GF Entertainment. The group consists of six members: Dann, Arthur, Mujin, Louis, Ivan and Jahan. They debuted on February 18, 2021, with the extended play (EP) History of Kingdom: Part I. Arthur.

== History ==
=== Pre-debut ===
Dann and Arthur were former members of the group Varsity. Dann also participated in JTBC's Mix Nine, finishing in 71st place among male contestants.

=== 2021–2023: Debut and History of Kingdom series ===
Kingdom debuted on February 18, 2021, with the release of their first EP, History of Kingdom: Part I. Arthur, and lead single "Excalibur". Their second EP, History of Kingdom: Part II. Chiwoo, and its lead single, "Karma", was released on July 1. Kingdom's third EP, History of Kingdom: Part III. Ivan, and its lead single, "Black Crown", was released on October 21, 2021.

On March 31, 2022, Kingdom's fourth EP, History of Kingdom: Part IV. Dann, and its lead single, "Ascension", was released. It was supposed to be released on March 17, but delayed after Arthur and Mujin tested positive for COVID-19. On May 25, 2022, Chiwoo terminated his contract with GF Entertainment citing "personal reasons" and left the group. On August 31, 2022, Hwon was introduced as the newest member of the group. He made his debut with the release of the fifth EP, History of Kingdom: Part V. Louis and its lead single, "Long Live the King", on October 5.

On March 23, 2023, Kingdom released their sixth EP History of Kingdom: Part VI. Mujin, with the lead single, "Dystopia".

On October 17, 2023, the group released their seventh EP, History of Kingdom: Part VII. Jahan, with the lead single, "Coup D'etat". The album faced heavy criticism internationally, following the reveal of the album cover, which heavily resembled the cover of the Quran. GF Entertainment later released a formal apology, announcing they would reschedule pre-orders in order to redesign the album cover.

On November 20, 2023, GF Entertainment announced that due to worsening health, Louis would be going on a hiatus to focus on recovery. He was however, present for the 2023 AAA Performance.

=== 2024–present: Reformation and Realize ===
On April 3, Kingdom unveiled a coming soon poster for their upcoming comeback, scheduled for April 30. The next day, GF announced the group's name would be changed to The KingDom. On April 7, the group unveiled the scheduler of their eight EP Realize. On January 17, 2025, GF Entertainmend announced Hwon had left the group for personal reasons.

== Members ==
Current

Adapted from their official website.

- Dann (단)
- Arthur (아서)
- Mujin (무진)
- Louis (루이)
- Ivan (아이반)
- Jahan (자한)

Former

- Chiwoo (치우; 2021–2022)
- Hwon (훤; 2022–2025)

== Discography ==
=== Extended plays ===
List of extended plays, showing selected details, selected chart positions, and sales figures
Title	Details	Peak chart positions	Sales
Title	Details	KOR	Sales
History of Kingdom: Part I. Arthur	Released: February 18, 2021; Labels: GF, Genie Music; Formats: CD, digital download, streaming; Track listing: 1. "Majestic Departure"; 2. "Excalibur"; 3. "Night Air" (밤공기); 4. "Picasso" (피카소); 5. "X"; 6. "Night Air" (밤공기) (Acoustic ver.); 7. "Excalibur" (Inst.)	46	KOR: 4,144
History of Kingdom: Part II. Chiwoo	Released: July 1, 2021; Labels: GF, Warner Music; Formats: CD, digital download, streaming; Track listing: 1. "Intro: Echoes of Nirvana"; 2. "Karma"; 3. "Eternity"; 4. "Magical"; 5. "Warning"; 6. "Make Us"; 7. "Karma" (Inst.)	15	KOR: 11,376
History of Kingdom: Part III. Ivan	Released: October 21, 2021; Labels: GF, Warner Music; Formats: CD, digital download, streaming; Track listing: 1. "Intro: Legacy of Hatred"; 2. "Black Crown"; 3. "Fallen Star"; 4. "We Are"; 5. "Burn"; 6. "On Air"; 7. "Black Crown" (Inst.)	14	KOR: 14,405
History of Kingdom: Part IV. Dann	Released: March 31, 2022; Labels: GF, Warner Music; Formats: CD, digital download, streaming; Track listing: 1. "Intro: 宫 (Palace)"; 2. "Ascension" (승천); 3. "Blinder"; 4. "Illusion"; 5. "Appetite"; 6. "Promise" (단심가); 7. "Ascension" (승천) (Inst.)	10	KOR: 43,500
History of Kingdom: Part V. Louis	Released: October 5, 2022; Labels: GF, Warner Music; Formats: CD, digital download, streaming; Track listing: 1. "Intro: Requiem"; 2. "Long Live the King" (백야); 3. "Period" (마침표); 4. "Destiny"; 5. "Waka Waka"; 6. "Poison"; 7. "Long Live the King" (백야) (Inst.)	7	KOR: 49,144
History of Kingdom: Part VI. Mujin	Released: March 23, 2023; Labels: GF, Warner Music; Formats: CD, digital download, streaming; Track listing: 1. "Intro : Stigma (烙印)"; 2. "Dystopia (혼 (魂))"; 3. "Wind Song" (바람의 노래); 4. "Elements"; 5. "My Wave"; 6. "Love is Pain"; 7. "Dystopia (혼 (魂)) (Inst.)"	7	KOR: 57,201
History of Kingdom: Part VII. Jahan	Released: October 18, 2023; Labels: GF, Warner Music; Formats: CD, digital download, streaming; Track listing: 1. "Intro : Apocalypse"; 2. "Coup D'Etat"; 3. "Love Song"; 4. "X-Game"; 5. "On My Way"; 6. "Sandcastle"; 7. "Coup D'Etat" (Inst.)	7	KOR: 38,708
Realize	Released: April 30, 2024; Labels: GF, Warner Music; Formats: CD, digital download, streaming; Track listing: 1. "Flip that Coin"; 2. "Energy"; 3. "RusHush"; 4. "Gundam"; 5. "Best Thing"; 6. "Together"	16	KOR: 34,844
The Flower of the Moon	Released: September 23, 2025; Labels: GF, Warner Music; Formats: CD, digital download, streaming; Track listing: 1. "Last Flower"; 2. "Festival"; 3. "Forget"; 4. "Last Flower" (instrumental)	13	KOR: 18,740

=== Singles ===
List of singles, showing year released, selected chart positions, and name of the album
Title	Year	Peak chart positions	Album
Title	Year	US World	Album
Kingdom
"Excalibur"	2021	—	History of Kingdom: Part I. Arthur
"Karma"	2021	8	History of Kingdom: Part II. Chiwoo
"Black Crown"	2021	7	History of Kingdom: Part III. Ivan
"Ascension" (승천)	2022	6	History of Kingdom: Part IV. Dann
"Long Live the King"	2022	—	History of Kingdom: Part V. Louis
"Dystopia"	2023	—	History of Kingdom: Part VI. Mujin
"Coup D'etat"	2023	—	History of Kingdom: Part VII. Jahan
The KingDom
"Flip That Coin"	2024	—	Realize
"Last Flower (화월가)"	2025	—	The KingDom: The Flower Of The Moon
"—" denotes releases that did not chart or were not released in that region.

== Awards and nominations ==
Name of the award ceremony, year presented, award category, nominee(s) of the award, and the result of the nomination
Award ceremony	Year	Category	Nominee(s)	Result	Ref.
Asia Artist Awards	2021	Focus Award – Music	Kingdom	Won	
Asia Artist Awards	2022	Potential Award – Singer	Kingdom	Won	
Asia Artist Awards	2023	New Wave Award – Music	Kingdom	Won	
Korea Contribution Awards	2023	Cultural Grand Prize	Kingdom	Won	
Korea First Brand Awards	2022	Male Idol Rising Star Award	Kingdom	Nominated	
Newsis K-EXPO Cultural Awards	2021	Next Generation Hallyu Star Award	Kingdom	Won	

== Ambassadorship ==
Year	Title	Ref.
2023	Public Relations Ambassador for Gyeonggi-do Youth Phone 1388	
