= Pixy (group) =

South Korean girl group

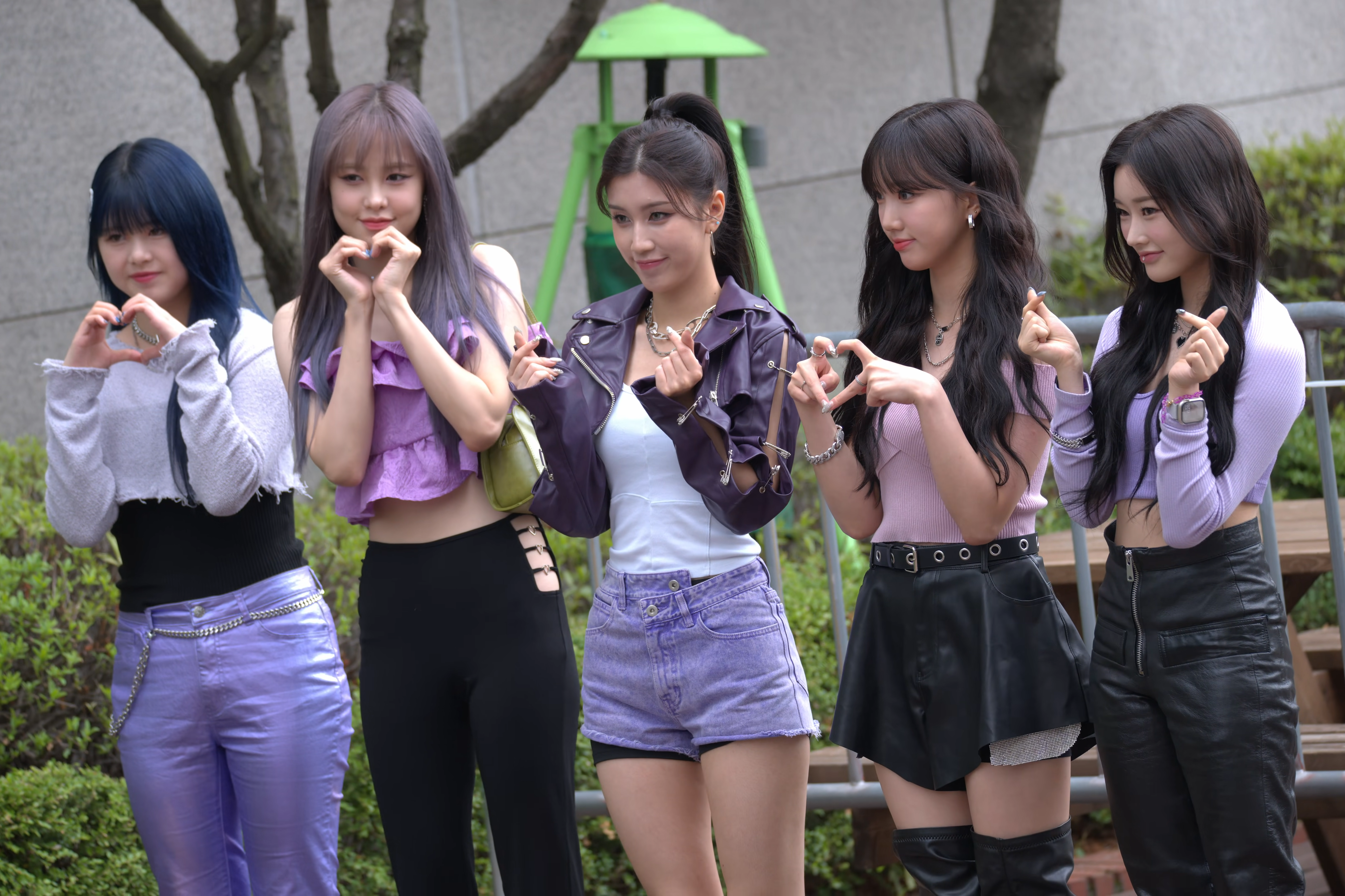
- Pixy in July 2022; From left to right: Satbyeol, Lola, Dia, Sua, Dajeong

Background information
- Origin: Seoul, South Korea
- Genre: K-pop
- Years active: 2021–2024
- Labels: Allart Entertainment; Happy Tribe Entertainment
- Members: Sua; Rinji
- Past members: Dia; Ella; Satbyeol; Dajeong; Lola

Pixy (/ˈpɪksi/; Korean: 픽시, stylized in all caps) is a South Korean girl group formed in 2021 by Allart Entertainment and Happy Tribe Entertainment. They debuted on February 24, 2021, with the digital single "Wings". Original a sextet, the group has gone through multiple lineup changes and currently consists of two members: Sua and Rinji. On August 27, 2022, members Ella and Satbyeol left the group due to health concerns and member Rinji was added. On June 20, 2024, Dajeong left the group, followed by Lola on September 15 and Dia in 2026. On September 3, 2025, Allart Entertainment announced a suspension of all activities due to bankruptcy.

On July 31, 2024 Dajeong debuted as a soloist under the name U_Chae. In 2026, former members Dia and Lola also debuted as soloists on January 8 and January 18 respectively. In April 2026, Dia, Lola, and U_Chae debuted together as a trio with the name AWU.

== History ==
=== Pre-debut ===
Ella was the former leader of the group Cherry Bullet under the stage name Mirae. She left the group on December 13, 2019 with members Kokoro and Linlin for personal reasons. Satbyeol was a former member of the group Girls' Alert. On April 24, 2020, the company Roots Entertainment pushed back the release of the group's album due to worsening situation caused by the COVID-19 pandemic. Three members chose to stay, while Satbyeol would join a new agency. Satbyeol also participated in JTBC's Mix Nine, where she finished 93rd. Dajeong was a former member of the kids' group SUPA. The group later disbanded in 2018.

=== 2021: Debut, Bravery and Temptation ===
On February 24, 2021, Pixy officially debuted with their digital single "Wings".

On May 20, Pixy released their first EP Bravery and its lead single "Let Me Know".

On October 7, Pixy released their second EP Temptation and its lead singles "Addicted" and "Bewitched".

On December 14, they released digital single "Call Me".

=== 2022–2023: Reborn, line-up changes and Chosen Karma ===
The group released their third EP, titled Reborn, on June 15, 2022. Member Ella wouldn't participate as she took a break due to health concerns. On August 27, Allart Entertainment announced that due to their worsening health conditions, Ella and Satbyeol would officially be leaving Pixy and the group would be reorganized as four members. On September 27, Allart Entertainment announced that Hwang Rin-ji, under the stage name Rinji, would be joining the group at the start of their planned European tour "Wanna Be Your Villain".

In 2023, Pixy went on an American Tour. The group also released their fourth EP Chosen Karma on March 10, 2023. The group released their digital EP, The Voice on October 24, 2023.

=== 2024–2025: Members departures, bankruptcy, and solo activities ===
Dajeong announced on Instagram that she left Pixy on June 20, 2024. She then debuted as a soloist under JUNITY Entertainment with the name U_Chae on July 31. On September 15, Lola announced on Instagram that her contract had ended with Allart Entertainment and that she would be leaving the group. On September 3, 2025, Allart Entertainment announced bankruptcy and that all activities were suspended until further notice.

On January 8, 2026, Dia released the solo single "Dance!". On January 18, Lola released her solo single "Tatz". In April, former members Dia, Lola, and U_Chae (formerly Dajeong) redebuted as the group AWU.

== Members ==
Adapted from their Naver profile and Reposition clip.

=== Current ===
- Sua (수아) – vocalist
- Rinji (린지) – rapper

=== Former ===
- Dia (디아) – leader, dancer, vocalist
- Ella (엘라) - leader, vocalist
- Satbyeol (샛별) – rapper
- Dajeong (다정) – vocalist
- Lola (로라) – rapper

== Discography ==
=== EPs ===
List of EPs, showing selected details, selected chart positions, and sales figures
Title	Details	Peak chart positions	Sales
Title	Details	KOR	Sales
Bravery	Released: May 20, 2021; Labels: Allart Entertainment, Happy Tribe Entertainment; Formats: CD, digital download, streaming; Track listing: 1. "Intro: sgniw ym htiw ylF (Fly with my wings)" 2. "Let Me Know"; 3. "(Hot) The Moon"; 4. "Greedy"; 5. "Insomnia"; 6. "Wings" (날개) (Remix); 7. "Let Me Know" (Inst.); 8. "The Moon" (Inst.)	67	KOR: 1,100
Temptation	Released: October 7, 2021; Labels: Allart Entertainment, Happy Tribe Entertainment; Formats: CD, digital download, streaming; Track listing: 1. "Intro (End of the Forest)"; 2. "Addicted" (중독); 3. "Bewitched"; 4. "Moonlight"; 5. "Still with Me" (To.Winxy); 6. "Bewitched" (Eng Ver.); 7. "Moonlight" (Eng Ver.); 8. "Bewitched" (Inst.); 9. "Addicted" (중독) (Inst.)	27	KOR: 6,250
Reborn	Released: June 15, 2022; Labels: Allart Entertainment, Happy Tribe Entertainment; Formats: CD, digital download, streaming; Track listing: 1. "Villain"; 2. "Breath" (숨); 3. "Natural"; 4. "Deja Vu"; 5. "Greetings" (안부); 6. "Swan Song"; 7. "Villain" (Inst.)	27	KOR: 8,405
Chosen Karma	Released: March 10, 2023; Labels: Allart Entertainment, Happy Tribe Entertainment; Formats: CD, digital download, streaming; Track listing: 1. "Hide & Seek"; 2. "Flip a Coin"; 3. "Karma"; 4. "Falling"; 5. "Whisper (궛속말)"; 6. "Karma (Inst.)"	19	KOR: 23,565
The Voice	Released: October 24, 2023; Labels: Allart Entertainment, Happy Tribe Entertainment; Formats: Digital download, streaming; Track listing: 1. "Truth Or Dare"; 2. "P.S."; 3. "Truth Or Dare English Version"; 4. "The Letter"	—	—
"—" denotes a recording that did not chart or was not released in that territory

=== Single albums ===
List of single albums, and showing selected details
Title	Details
With My Wings	Released: February 24, 2021; Labels: Allart Entertainment, Happy Tribe Entertainment; Formats: Digital download, streaming; Track listing: 1. Wings (날개)

=== Singles ===
List of singles, showing year released, and name of the album
Title	Year	Album
"Wings" (날개)	2021	With My Wings
"Let Me Know"	2021	Bravery
"Addicted" (중독)	2021	Temptation
"Moonlight"	2021	Temptation
"Bewitched"	2021	Temptation
"Call Me" (불러불러)	2021	Non-album single
"Villain"	2022	Reborn
"Karma"	2023	Chosen Karma

== Awards and nominations ==
Name of the award ceremony, year presented, award category, nominee(s) of the award, and the result of the nomination
Award ceremony	Year	Category	Nominee(s)	Result	Ref.
Asia Artist Awards	2021	Female Idol Group Popularity Award	Pixy	Nominated	
