= Hot Issue (group) =

South Korean girl group (2021–2022)

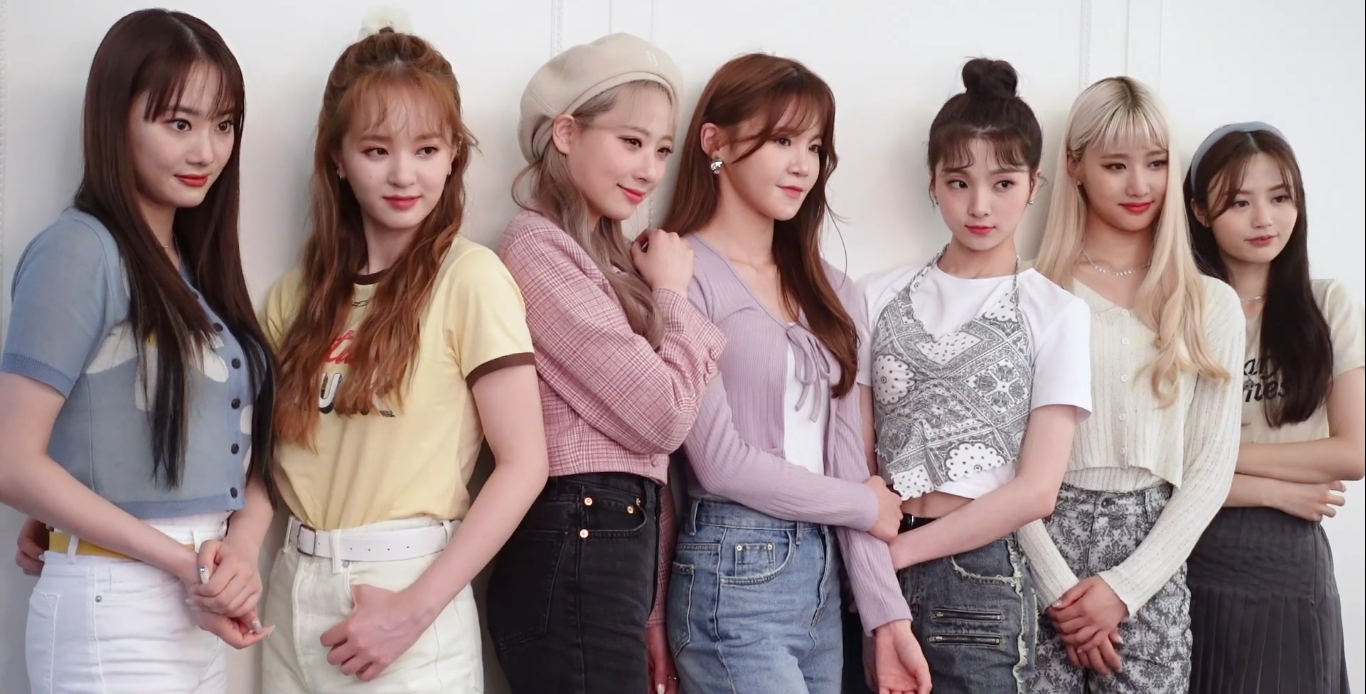
- Hot Issue in July 2021. From left to right: Nahyun, Hyeongshin, Yewon, Mayna, Dain, Yebin, and Dana

Background information
- Origin: Seoul, South Korea
- Genres: K-pop; Dance
- Years active: 2021–2022
- Label: S2 Entertainment
- Past members: Mayna; Nahyun; Hyeongshin; Dana; Yewon; Yebin; Dain
- Website: hotissue.com

Hot Issue (Korean: 핫이슈; stylized in all caps) was a South Korean girl group formed by S2 Entertainment in 2021. The group consisted of seven members: Mayna, Nahyun, Hyeongshin, Dana, Yewon, Yebin, and Dain. The group debuted on April 28, 2021, with their first extended play (EP), Issue Maker. The group officially disbanded on April 22, 2022.

== Name ==
The group name "Hot Issue" stands for Honest, Outstanding, and Terrific, and expresses a strong ambition to create honest and great issues in the music industry.

== History ==
=== Pre-debut ===
Before they debuted, Dana was a former child actress, starring in the JTBC drama Happy Ending in 2012 and in the SBS drama One Well-Raised Daughter in 2013. Mayna was a contestant on the Chinese survival show, Produce 101 China, but was eliminated in episode 7 after being ranked 52.

=== 2021–2022: Debut and disbandment ===
On April 8, 2021, S2 Entertainment announced through social media networks that Hot Issue would debut on April 28, with "Gratata" being revealed as the lead single of Issue Maker on April 12. On April 28, at 6 PM KST, their first EP, Issue Maker, was released along with the music video for "Gratata", with a debut showcase being held at Yes24 Live Hall in Seoul several hours before they debuted. The next day, the group made their music show debut on Episode 707 of M! Countdown on April 29.

On September 2, S2 Entertainment announced that Hot Issue would be making a comeback in September. They released their first single album Icons on September 29, with the lead single of the same name.

On April 22, 2022, after 4 months of no updates, S2 Entertainment announced that the group has officially disbanded, 6 days before their debut anniversary. The decision was made after a long period of discussion about their future and direction of the group.

== Members ==
Adapted from their Naver Profile

- Mayna (메이나)
- Nahyun (나현) - Leader
- Hyeongshin (형신)
- Dana (다나)
- Yewon (예원)
- Yebin (예빈)
- Dain (다인)

== Discography ==
=== Extended plays ===
Title	Album details	Peak chart positions	Sales
Title	Album details	KOR	Sales
Issue Maker	Released: April 28, 2021; Label: S2 Entertainment, Kakao Entertainment; Formats: CD, digital download, streaming audio; Track listing: 1. Gratata (그라타타); 2. Dunga Dunga; 3. Hide in the Dark; 4. Purple; 5. We Go	20	KOR: 95

=== Single albums ===
Title	Album details	Peak chart positions	Sales
Title	Album details	KOR	Sales
Icons	Released: September 29, 2021; Label: S2 Entertainment, Kakao Entertainment; Formats: CD, digital download, streaming audio; Track listing: 1. Icons; 2. Hot Candy	41	KOR: 582

=== Singles ===
Title	Year	Peak position	Album
Title	Year	KOR	Album
"Gratata" (그라타타)	2021	—	Issue Maker
"Icons"	2021	— (Note: "Icons" did not enter Gaon Digital Chart, but debuted and peaked at number 101 on Gaon Download Chart.)	Icons
"—" denotes releases that did not chart or were not released in that region.

== Videography ==
=== Music video ===
Year	Title	Director	Ref.
2021	"Gratata"	Etoi	
2021	"Icons"	Zanybros	

== Awards and nominations ==
Name of the award ceremony, year presented, category, nominee of the award, and the result of the nomination
Award ceremony	Year	Category	Nominee / Work	Result	Ref.
Asia Artist Awards	2021	Female Idol Group Popularity Award	Hot Issue	Nominated	
Brand of the Year Awards	2021	Female Rookie Idol Award	Hot Issue	Nominated	
