= 2022 in South Korean music =

The following is a list of notable events and releases that have happened in 2022 in music in South Korea.

== Notable events and achievements ==
- January 5 – V's "Christmas Tree" became the first Korean OST to enter the Billboard Hot 100 at number 79, as well as the first song by a Korean soloist to debut at number one on the US Digital Song Sales chart.
- January 6 – BTS, the Best became the first album by a Korean act in 17 years to sell over 1 million copies on the Oricon Albums Chart in Japan, since BoA's Best of Soul (2005).
- March 1 – Aespa became the first idol group to win Rookie of the Year at the Korean Music Awards, and the most-awarded girl group in the ceremony's history, with a record three wins at the 2022 ceremony.
- April 16, 23 – Coachella: 2NE1 reunites for the first time in over 6 years with a surprise performance on the Coachella main stage. Aespa also performs on the festival's main stage the following weekend.
- May 9 – AleXa performed her song "Wonderland" on the American Song Contest and became the first winner.
- June 30 – July 2 − The Jeddah K-Pop Festival 2022 is held at the Jeddah Super Dome—Saudi Arabia's first K-pop festival. Performers included Everglow, Ateez, Epex, Victon, CIX, Monsta X, and Verivery. Everglow becomes the first K-pop girl group to ever perform in Saudi Arabia.
- July 3 – Nayeon became the first K-pop soloist to enter the top 10 on the US Billboard 200 in the chart's history with her EP Im Nayeon.
- July 31 – J-Hope performed at Lollapalooza and became the first South Korean artist to headline the main stage at a major U.S. music festival.
- September 23, 25 – Blackpink became the first K-pop girl group to top UK Albums Chart with their second full-length album Born Pink. Blackpink also became the first K-pop girl group to top US Billboard 200 with Born Pink.
- November 20 – Jungkook performed at the 2022 FIFA World Cup opening ceremony.
- December 5 – Blackpink was named Time Magazine's Entertainer of the Year.
- December 26 – RM's Indigo reached a peak of 3 on the US Billboard 200, becoming the highest charting Korean soloist on the chart to-date, and the first to reach the top 5.

== Award shows and festivals ==
=== Award ceremonies ===
2022 music award ceremonies in South Korea
Date	Event	Host	Ref.
January 8	36th Golden Disc Awards	Ilgan Sports and JTBC Plus	
January 23	31st Seoul Music Awards	Sports Seoul	
January 27	11th Gaon Chart Music Awards	Korea Music Content Association	
March 1	19th Korean Music Awards	Korean Popular Music Awards Committee	
March 10	6th Korean Hiphop Awards	HiphopLE and Hiphopplaya	
October 8	5th The Fact Music Awards	The Fact and Fan N Star	
November 8	4th Genie Music Awards	Genie Music	
November 26	14th Melon Music Awards	KakaoBank	
November 29 and 30	24th MAMA Awards	CJ ENM	
December 13	7th Asia Artist Awards	Star News and Star Continent	

=== Festivals ===
2022 televised music festivals in South Korea
Date	Event	Host
December 16, 2022	KBS Song Festival	Korean Broadcasting System (KBS)
December 24, 2022	SBS Gayo Daejeon	Seoul Broadcasting System (SBS)
December 31, 2022	MBC Gayo Daejejeon	Munhwa Broadcasting Corporation (MBC)

== Debuting and disbanding in 2022 ==
=== Debuting groups ===
- Acid Angel from Asia
- Aimers
- Apink Chobom
- Astro – Jinjin & Rocky
- ATBO
- Blank2y
- Classy
- CSR
- Fifty Fifty
- Got the Beat
- H1-Key
- ILY:1
- Irris
- Kep1er
- Lapillus
- Le Sserafim
- Mamamoo+
- Mimiirose
- NewJeans
- Nine.I
- Nmixx
- Shinhwa WDJ
- Superkind
- TAN
- Tempest
- TNX
- Trendz
- Viviz
- Younite

=== Solo debuts ===
- Baekho
- Chaeyeon
- Choi Ye-na
- Choi Yoo-jung
- Jin
- Fatou
- Kihyun
- Kino
- Kim Jong-hyeon (JR)
- Lee Chan-hyuk
- Minho
- Miyeon
- Nayeon
- Seulgi
- Wonpil
- Xiumin
- Yerin
- Yuju

=== Disbandments ===
- April
- BugAboo
- Bvndit
- D-Crunch
- Girlkind
- Hot Issue
- Lunarsolar
- NU'EST
- Redsquare
- TRCNG

== Releases in 2022 ==
=== First quarter ===
==== January ====
Date	Album	Artist(s)	Ref.
3	Bobbin	Blitzers	
3	First Impact	Kep1er	
3	Disharmony: Find Out	P1Harmony	
3	Novella	Up10tion	
3	Ruby	Woozi	
4	Planet Nine : Voyager	Onewe	
5	Super Yuppers!	WJSN Chocome	
5	Athletic Girl	H1-Key	
5	Love Me Like	Omega X	
5	Blue Set Chapter 1: Tracks	Trendz	
6	Essay ep. 1	Jang Minho	
7	Rewind	BZ Boys	
10	Dimension: Answer	Enhypen	
10	Illusion	Kim Yo-han	
12	Marvelous	Mirae	
13	Devil	Max Changmin	
14	Instinct Part. 2	OnlyOneOf	
14	Yummy Yummy Love	Momoland	
16	Whee	Wheein	
17	Midnight Guest	Fromis 9	
17	Villain	Drippin	
17	Restore	Jinjin & Rocky	
17	Smiley	Choi Ye-na	
17	Complete With You	AB6IX	
18	Chronograph	Victon	
18	Rec.	Yuju	
18	B	BamBam	
19	6equence	Moonbyul	
20	Self n Ego	Luminous	
24	In:vite U	Pentagon	
24	Rica Rica	Nature	
25	Love Story (4 Season Project 季)	Kyuhyun	
26	Love.	Def.	

==== February ====
Date	Album	Artist(s)	Ref.
7	Pilmography	Wonpil	
8	Love&Fight	Ravi	
8	Fighting	Rolling Quartz	
9	You	Ha Sung-woon	
9	Beam of Prism	Viviz	
10	Born	Big Mama	
14	Horn	Apink	
14	Epik High Is Here 下 (Part 2)	Epik High	
14	INVU	Taeyeon	
15	The Second Step: Chapter One	Treasure	
15	Lovender	Han Seung Yun	
15	American Gothic	DeVita	
21	Be Together	BtoB	
21	Young-Luv.com	STAYC	
22	Ad Mare	Nmixx	
23	The Collective Soul and Unconscious: Chapter One	Billlie	
24	Dance with God	Craxy	
25	First Letter	Solji	
28	Yellow Punch	Rocket Punch	
28	The Road: Winter for Spring	Super Junior	

==== March ====
Date	Album	Artist(s)	Ref.
2	Cherry Wish	Cherry Bullet	
2	It's Me, It's We	Tempest	
2	2	Bang Yong-guk	
7	3rd Desire (Reve)	Kim Woo-seok	
7	Play Game: Awake	Weeekly	
10	1TAN	TAN	
14	I Never Die	(G)I-dle	
14	Thank You	Brave Girls	
15	Voyager	Kihyun	
15	Refuge	Moonbin & Sanha	
15	Needle & Bubble	NU'EST	
16	容: Face	Solar	
16	Love Pt. 1: First Love	WEi	
16	Dimension	Xia	
18	Oddinary	Stray Kids	
21	The ReVe Festival 2022 – Feel My Rhythm	Red Velvet	
21	Daydream	Highlight	
22	Liberty: In Our Cosmos	Cravity	
24	Customary Place	Lee Seok-hoon	
28	Glitch Mode	NCT Dream	
28	Real Love	Oh My Girl	
29	MemeM	Purple Kiss	
30	End Theory: Final Edition	Younha	
30	Intersection: Blaze	BAE173	
30	New World	Nine.I	
31	History of Kingdom: Part IV. Dann	Kingdom	

=== Second quarter ===
==== April ====
Date	Album	Artist(s)	Ref.
4	Grey Suit	Suho	
4	Color	Kwon Eun-bi	
4	Love in Bloom	ILY:1	
5	Love Dive	Ive	
6	A Business Proposal OST	Various artists	
7	Arcade: V	Ghost9	
11	Dice	Onew	
12	Apocalypse: Save Us	Dreamcatcher	
12	Chase Episode 2. Maum	DKZ	
14	Just Begun	Just B	
19	Estrena	Jang Yoon-jeong	
20	Seoul	Bolbbalgan4	
20	Youni-birth	Younite	
21	The Song of Love	Song Ga-in	
22	Savior	Sungkyu	
25	Series "O" Round 3: Whole	Verivery	
26	Shape of Love	Monsta X	
26	My Name	Lee Su-jeong	
27	My	Miyeon	
27	Miro	Yoon Ji-sung	
27	Roar	E'Last	
27	Melo Drama	4Men	
27	Day&Night	Soyou	
27	Bridge of Dreams	Ichillin'	
28	Rebel	DKB	
28	Cheese in the Trap (C.I.T.T)	Moonbyul	
29	Psy 9th	Psy	

==== May ====
Date	Album	Artist(s)	Ref.
2	Im Hero	Lim Young-woong	
2	Fearless	Le Sserafim	
3	Flashback	iKon	
3	A Wild Rose	Ryeowook	
3	Invitation	MeloMance	
4	Colorful Trauma	Woodz	
5	Y: Class Is Over	Classy	
9	Minisode 2: Thursday's Child	Tomorrow X Together	
10	Jannabi's Small Pieces II: Grippin'TheGreen	Jannabi	
11	The Code	Ciipher	
11	Where Is My Garden!	Jeong Se-woon	
12	By My Side	Hwang Chi-yeul	
16	Drive to the Starry Road	Astro	
16	Deep	Hyoyeon	
16	Season Note	Davichi	
17	Trickster	Oneus	
17	Way Up	TNX	
17	Sory	Lee Soo-young	
18	A to B	AB6IX	
18	Aria	Yerin	
20	Timeless	Onewe	
23	Got7	Got7	
24	The Story	Kang Daniel	
24	Into the Light	Lightsum	
24	Lucky Charms!	Moon Soo-jin	
24	K2Y I: Confidence [Thumbs Up]	Blank2y	
25	Re-Original	Bvndit	
26	Lives Across	Classy	
27	Face the Sun	Seventeen	
30	Beatbox	NCT Dream	
30	The Beginning: World Tree	Forestella	
31	Chaos	Victon	

==== June ====
Date	Album	Artist(s)	Ref.
2	Op.22 Y-Waltz: in Major	Jo Yu-ri	
2	Lost	Dvwn	
6	Happy Birthday	Son Dong-woon	
8	Blue Set Chapter 2. Choice	Trendz	
8	Doomchita	Secret Number	
8	The Four Season	Shin Yong-jae	
9	Joy	Woo!ah!	
9	Nangman	Big Naughty	
10	Proof	BTS	
13	Facade	Wonho	
13	Pop	BugAboo	
14	Star	Paul Kim	
14	Love&Love	Seo In-guk	
15	Blue Sky	BDC	
15	Reborn	Pixy	
15	Villain: Zero	Drippin	
15	Story Written in Music	Omega X	
16	Seven,	Yim Jae-beom	
20	Doublast	Kep1er	
20	Flip That	Loona	
20	Hit Ya!	Lapillus	
21	Sugar	Youngjae	
21	W Series '2TAN' (Wish ver)	TAN	
22	Re:	Kard	
22	Cronicle	Sung Hoon	
23	Room Vol.1	Lee Mu-jin	
24	Im Nayeon	Nayeon	
27	From Our Memento Box	Fromis 9	
27	Boom	Lee Min-hyuk	
27	Alone	Coogie	
30	Undo	Heize	

=== Third quarter ===
==== July ====
Date	Album	Artist(s)	Ref.
1	Happy 25th Jaurim	Jaurim	
4	MMM	Young Tak	
4	Manifesto: Day 1	Enhypen	
5	Sequence	WJSN	
5	Holiday	Winner	
6	Run	H1-Key	
6	Wanna Know	Irris	
6	Summer Vibe	Viviz	
6	Podium	You Chae Hoon	
7	The Earth: Secret Mission Chapter.2	MCND	
8	Girls	Aespa	
11	Bare & Rare	Chungha	
11	Tropical Romance	Busters	
12	Copycat	Apink Chobom	
12	The Road: Keep On Going	Super Junior	
12	Delicious	Woo Jin-young	
13	The Wave OF9	SF9	
14	Daft Love	Boycold	
15	Checkmate	Itzy	
15	Jack in the Box	J-Hope	
18	Ice	Hyolyn	
18	Sector 17	Seventeen	
19	Que Sera Sera	ILY:1	
19	We Need Love	STAYC	
19	Ego 90'S	Babylon	
20	Win-Dow	Blitzers	
20	Harmony: Zero In	P1Harmony	
20	Nabillera	Hyuna	
20	Hello, World!	Xdinary Heroes	
20	We're Not Alone Final: Only You	GreatGuys	
22	Do Not Go Gentle Into That Good Night II	Justhis	
24	Hook Up	Ahn Byeong-woong	
25	Youni-Q	Younite	
25	Geekyland	Purple Kiss	
26	Genuine	Sunye	
26	W Series '2TAN' (We ver)	TAN	
27	YOU.FO	Nicole	
27	Panorama	Kim Ho-joong	
27	Grown Ass Kid	Zico	
27	The Beginning : 開花	ATBO	
27	Sequence : 7272	CSR	
28	Why Not??	TO1	
28	337	Dalsoobin	
28	Omnibus Pt. 1: Kaleidoscope	Shaun	
29	The World EP.1: Movement	Ateez	

==== August ====
Date	Album	Artist(s)	Ref.
1	Count on Me	Soohyun	
1	New Jeans	NewJeans	
3	Smartphone	Choi Ye-na	
3	Genzi3	Davii	
8	Forever 1	Girls' Generation	
8	Aura	Golden Child	
9	Leviosa	Tri.be	
9	Pose	Kino	
10	The End of Puberty	D.Ark	
16	Be Aware	The Boyz	
16	Who Am I	Craxy	
16	Storage of ONF	ONF	
17	Odyssey: Dash	BAE173	
17	Luminous in Wonderland	Luminous	
17	Childhood	Lucy	
17	My Sun	Kim Hyun-joong	
22	After Like	Ive	
22	OK Episode 1: OK Not	CIX	
24	Strange World	Ha Sung-woon	
24	K2Y II: Passion [Fuego]	Blank2y	
25	Autumn	DKB	
26	Between 1&2	Twice	
29	5ight	Lee Jin-hyuk	
29	Shining Up	Tempest	
29	Flash	Rocket Punch	
30	Gasoline	Key	
31	The Billage of Perception: Chapter Two	Billlie	

==== September ====
Date	Album	Artist(s)	Ref.
5	Malus	Oneus	
5	Empty Dream	Kim Jae-hwan	
6	To Whom It May Concern	Bernard Park	
7	Eyes on You	Kangta	
12	Love&Holiday	Ravi	
13	Born Gene	Kim Jae-joong	
14	Sunflower	Choi Yoo-jung	
15	But for Now Leave Me Alone	pH-1	
16	Born Pink	Blackpink	
16	Awesome	Mimiirose	
16	2 Baddies	NCT 127	
16	Imagine Club	Sole	
19	Entwurf	Nmixx	
20	Thousand Years	Peppertones	
21	Be Yourself	Jay B	
22	Girl's Round Part.1	Lapillus	
26	Brand New	Xiumin	
26	Adorable REbirth	Adora	
27	New Wave	Cravity	
28	Ourturn	Mirae	
29	Five Senses	Be'O	
29	X	EXID	

=== Fourth quarter ===
==== October ====
Date	Album	Artist(s)	Ref.
4	The Second Step: Chapter Two	Treasure	
4	28 Reasons	Seulgi	
4	Take a Chance	AB6IX	
5	One Bad Night	Jamie	
5	History of Kingdom: Part V. Louis	Kingdom	
5	Let's Koyote	Koyote	
6	Chase Episode 3. Beum	DKZ	
7	Maxident	Stray Kids	
10	Luv Sign	June	
11	Mic On	Mamamoo	
11	Apocalypse: Follow Us	Dreamcatcher	
11	Dream & Deurim	TAN	
12	Lethality	Kwon Eun-bi	
12	Absolute Zero	Baekho	
12	The Answer	Park Ji-hoon	
12	Code Name: Arrow	Up10tion	
12	Hush Rush	Chaeyeon	
13	Troubleshooter	Kep1er	
13	Reddy Action	Reddy	
14	Bittersweet	Wonho	
17	I Love	(G)I-dle	
17	Antifragile	Le Sserafim	
17	Dearest	N.Flying	
17	Error	Lee Chan-hyuk	
17	Abandoned Love.	Def.	
18	Studio We : Recording #3	Onewe	
19	Love Pt. 2: Passion	WEi	
19	Meantime	Lil Boi	
24	Youth	Kihyun	
24	Op.22 Y-Waltz: in Minor	Jo Yu-ri	
25	And	Roy Kim	
26	Prelude of Love Chapter 1. Puppy Love	Epex	
26	Day & Night	Classy	
26	The Beginning: 始作	ATBO	
26	Before Sunrise Part. 4	TFN	
27	Dance On	Alice	
28	Access	Acid Angel from Asia	
28	The Astronaut	Jin	
29	Dirt	Paloalto	
31	Youni-On	Younite	

==== November ====
Date	Album	Artist(s)	Ref.
6	Nature World: Code W	Nature	
7	After Sunset	Highlight	
8	Meridiem	Kim Jong-hyeon	
8	I (Part. 1)	Nine.I	
8	Eternal	Jang Minho	
9	The Lights	Jukjae	
10	Loner	Yong Jun-hyung	
11	Girls Gone Vogue	AleXa	
11	Log	Jung Eun-ji	
11	Overload	Xdinary Heroes	
12	Blue Set Chapter. Unknown Code	Trendz	
14	Last Scene	Chen	
14	Liminality – Ep.Love	Verivery	
14	Selfish	YooA	
15	Choice	Victon	
15	Villain: The End	Drippin	
15	Pieces of _	Kevin Oh	
16	= (Neun)	Just B	
16	Pit-a-Pat	Woo!ah!	
16	Tap	Secret Number	
16	Magic	Artbeat	
17	Sequence: 17&	CSR	
18	Love or Loved Part.1	B.I	
18	Lowlife Princess: Noir	Bibi	
18	The Fifty	Fifty Fifty	
22	On and On	Tempest	
22	Forgive Me	BoA	
23	Latecomer	NTX	
23	Up2U	TO1	
23	First of All	Hynn	
24	The Story: Retold	Kang Daniel	
24	Comma	Woo Won-jae	
28	The ReVe Festival 2022 – Birthday	Red Velvet	
28	A to Z	Niel	
29	Move Again	Kara	
29	Cold Day	Kassy	
30	Cheshire	Itzy	
30	Harmony: Set In	P1Harmony	

==== December ====
Date	Album	Artist(s)	Ref.
1	Man	Jung Dong-won	
1	WinterStella	Stella Jang	
1	Merry Spooky X-Mas	Jaurim	
2	Indigo	RM	
2	Color Mood	Hong Jin-young	
6	Chase	Minho	
6	Come to Life	Shinhwa WDJ	
15	The Road: Celebration	Super Junior	
16	Candy	NCT Dream	
21	SKZ-Replay	Stray Kids	
26	2022 Winter SM Town: SMCU Palace	SM Town	
29	3	Broken Valentine	
30	Spin Off: From the Witness	Ateez	

== See also ==
- List of South Korean films of 2022
- List of Circle Album Chart number ones of 2022
- List of Circle Digital Chart number ones of 2022
