= 2022 in Asian music =

== Events ==
- January 12 – Indonesian singer Ardhito Pramono is arrested for possession of marijuana.
- January 23 – The 31st Seoul Music Awards are held in South Korea, hosted by Kim Sung-joo, Boom, and Kim Seol-hyun. Winners include NCT 127, Lim Young-woong and BTS.
- February 18 – Modhaus announce the launch of the world's first "fan-participating girl group", TripleS.
- February – Punjabi hip hop singer Sidhu Moose Wala faces a court case for contravening the election code of conduct while a candidate for the Indian National Congress.
- April 11 – Sidhu Moose Wala's latest single insults some of the voters responsible for his failure in the 2022 Punjab state assembly elections.
- May 19 – The family of Balwinder Safri, Indian banghra singer from Birmingham, ask New Cross Hospital not to switch off his dialysis machine while he is in a coma after suffering brain damage during an operation.
- July 19 – Balwinder Safri is reported to have made a "miracle recovery" after several months in a coma.
- July 28 – During a concert by Cantopop dance group Mirror in the Hong Kong Coliseum, an overhead screen falls onto the stage, injuring two on stage.
- September 1 – The English-language film Tár is released, featuring a performance by the Siam Sinfonietta (portraying a Filipino orchestra).
- October 14 – Asia Song Festival is held at Yeouido Park in Seoul and features performers from South Korea, Japan, Philippines, Vietnam, Indonesia, Thailand and Kazakhstan.
- December 10–11 – The UNIK Asia Festival was held in Central Harbourfront Event Space.

== Albums ==
- Onewe (South Korea) – Planet Nine: Voyager (January 4)
- Hikaru Utada (Japan) – Bad Mode (January 19)
- Boris (Japan) – W (January 21)
- Cloud Wan – The Cloud (December 19)
- Confess (Iran) – Revenge at All Costs (January 21)
- @onefive (Japan) – 1518 (February 2)
- Girish and The Chronicles – Hail to the Heroes (February 11)
- Gin Lee – Time & Faith (July 12)
- JAM Project (Japan) – Max the Max ~JAM Project Best Collection XIV
- Scandal (Japan) – MIRROR (January 26)
- Bloodywood (India) – Rakshak (February 18)
- Janice Vidal – Daughter (December 19)
- Jay Fung – Love & Loss (December 28)
- Koda Kumi (Japan) – Heart (March 2)
- Nigo (Japan) – I Know Nigo! (March 25)
- Lim Young-woong (South Korea) – Im Hero
- Acid Eyes (South Korea) – Cherry Gene (June 6)
- Stray Kids (Japan) – Circus (June 22)

== Classical ==
- Unsuk Chin (South Korea) – Scherben der Stille (Shards of Silence), for violin and orchestra
- Huang Ruo (China) – A Dust in Time (first recording)
- Toshio Hosokawa (Japan) – Yukio Mishima’s Hanjo

== Film, TV and video game scores ==
- Hideyuki Fukasawa – Orient (Japan)
- Anup Rubens – Bangarraju (India - Telugu)

== Musical films ==
- Ishrat Made in China (Pakistan), score by Shani Arshad with music by various artists
- Laal Singh Chaddha (India - Hindi), with music by Pritam and lyrics by Amitabh Bhattacharya.
- Ponniyin Selvan: I (India - Tamil), with music by A. R. Rahman

== Deaths ==
- January 2 – Nindy Ellesse, 54, Indonesian singer, actress and TV presenter.
- January 8 – Sornphet Sornsuphan, 73, Thai luk thung singer.
- January 9 – Desmond de Silva, 78, Sri Lankan singer
- January 17 – Neela Wickramasinghe, 71, Sri Lankan singer and composer
- February 1 – Hiroshima, Japanese drummer (G.I.S.M.) (death announced on this date)
- February 6 – Lata Mangeshkar, 92, Indian playback singer
- February 16
  - Dorce Gamalama, 58, Indonesian singer and television presenter (COVID-19)
  - Bappi Lahiri, 69, Indian singer, composer and record producer (complications from obstructive sleep apnea)
- February 22
  - Muvaffak "Maffy" Falay, 92, Turkish trumpeter
  - Jayananda Lama, 65, Nepalese folk singer and actor
- March 13 – Li Guangxi, 92, Chinese operatic tenor
- March 22 – Eva Castillo, 52, Filipina singer
- March 25 – Keith Martin, 55, Filipino singer
- March 30 – Jun Lopito, 64, Filipino guitarist
- April 6 – Wen Hsia, 93, Taiwanese singer and actor
- April 8 – Nagai Sriram, 41, Indian Carnatic violinist
- April 15 – Koji, 49, Japanese guitarist of La'cryma Christi (esophageal cancer)
- April 17 – Prafulla Kar, 83, Indian Oriya singer, songwriter and musician
- May 10 – Shivkumar Sharma, 84, Indian composer and santoor player
- May 29
  - Ma Jinfeng, 99, Chinese opera performer.
  - Sidhu Moose Wala, 28, Indian Punjabi singer, actor and politician (shot)
- May 31 – KK, 53, Indian playback singer (heart attack)
- June 8 – Song Hae, 95, South Korean television host and singer
- June 18 – Adibah Noor, 51, Malaysian singer and actress (ovarian cancer)
- June 23 – Yuri Shatunov, 48, Russian singer (heart attack)
- July 3 – Miu Chu, 40, Taiwanese singer (breast cancer)
- July 8 – Alam Khan, 78, Bangladeshi composer (lung cancer)
- July 13 – Rubina Qureshi, 81, Pakistani Sindhi classical singer
- July 18 – Bhupinder Singh, 82, Indian ghazal singer (COVID-19 and colorectal cancer)
- July 26 – Balwinder Safri, 63, Indian folk singer
- July 31 – Nirmala Mishra, 83, Tollywood playback singer
- August 11
  - Mohamed Huzam, 52, Maldivian playback singer
  - Shimoga Subbanna, 83, Indian Kannada playback singer
- August 12 – Ebrahim Qanbari-Mehr, 93, Iranian musical instrument maker
- August 20 – Nayyara Noor, 71, Pakistani playback singer
- August 27 – Georges Al Rassi, 42, Lebanese actor, singer and songwriter (car accident)
- August 29 – John P. Varkey, 52, Indian guitarist, songwriter and composer
- September 10 – Choichi Terukina, 90, Japanese Ryukyuan musician and sanshin player
- October 7 – Toshi Ichiyanagi, 89, Japanese pianist and composer
- December 9
  - Jovit Baldivino, 29, Filipino singer and actor (intracranial aneurysm)
  - Qamar Gula, 70, Afghan Pashto language singer
- December 10 – Sulochana Chavan, 89, Indian Marathi singer
- December 10 – Nihal Nelson, 76, Sri Lankan vocalist, songwriter and composer

== By country ==
- 2022 in Chinese music
- 2022 in Japanese music
- 2022 in Philippine music
- 2022 in South Korean music

== See also ==
- 2022 in music
