= Light a Wish =

- Digital cover

Single album by Lightsum
- Released: October 13, 2021
- Genre: K-pop
- Length: 10:21
- Language: Korean
- Label: Cube; Kakao

Lightsum chronology
Vanilla (2021)	Light a Wish (2021)	Into the Light (2022)

Singles from Light a Wish
- 1. "Vivace" Released: October 13, 2021

Light a Wish is the second single album by South Korean girl group Lightsum. It consists of three tracks, including the lead single "Vivace". The single album was released by Cube Entertainment on October 13, 2021.

== Background and release ==
On September 24, Cube Entertainment announced that Lightsum would be releasing their second single album titled Light a Wish on October 13. On September 28, the promotional schedule was released. On September 29, the track listing was released with "Vivace" announced as the lead single. The teaser photo was released on September 30 and October 1. On October 6, the teaser video was released. On October 7, the audio teaser was released. Prior to the single album's release, on October 13, 2021, Lightsum held a showcase to introduce the single album. The single album along with music video for "Vivace" was released on the same day.

== Composition ==
The lead single "Vivace" is described as a future bass and house genre song with "harmonious synth and a dreamy and mysterious mood". The second track "You, Jam" is described as a song with "addictive melody that seems to be imprinted in your mind once you hear it" with lyrics about "the curiosity-filled emotions of the other person with Gen Z sensibility". The last track "Popcorn" features "colorful melody line of teen atmosphere" which makes Lightsum's "unique musical concept stand out".

== Commercial performance ==
Light a Wish debuted at position 7 on South Korea's Gaon Album Chart in the chart issue dated October 10–16, 2021.

== Track listing ==
Track listing for Light a Wish
No.	Title	Lyrics	Music	Arrangement	Length
1.	"Vivace"	Tenzo; Wwwave (PaperMaker)	Tenzo; Wwwave (PaperMaker)	Wwwave (PaperMaker)	3:35
2.	"You, Jam"	Jinli (Full8loom)	Faces of Glory (Full8loom); Jinli (Full8loom); Yuka (Full8loom)	Faces of Glory (Full8loom); Yuka (Full8loom)	3:19
3.	"Popcorn"	Jo Yoon-kyung	Steven Lee; Andreas Stone Johansson; Laurell Barker; Joe Lawrence	Joe Lawrence; Steven Lee	3:27
Total length:					10:21

== Charts ==
Chart performance for Light a Wish
Chart (2021)	Peak position
South Korean Albums (Gaon)	7

== Release history ==
Release history for Light a Wish
Region	Format	Label
Various	Digital download; streaming	Cube; Kakao
South Korea	CD	Cube; Kakao
