= Play (Yuju song) =

Single by Yuju

from the album Rec.
- Language: Korean
- Released: January 18, 2022
- Genre: Dance pop
- Length: 3:22
- Label: Konnect; Warner Music
- Composers: Yuju; Chancellor; MZMC; Pinkslip; Inverness
- Lyricists: Yuju; Chancellor; Amelia Moore; MZMC

Yuju singles chronology
"So Silly" (2021)	"Play" (2022)	"Evening" (2022)

Music video
- "Play" on YouTube

"Play" (Korean: 놀이; RR: Nori) is a song recorded by South Korean singer Yuju for her debut extended play Rec.. It was released as the lead single on January 18, 2022, by Konnect Entertainment. The song was written by Yuju alongside Chancellor, Amelia Moore, and MZMC, composed by Yuju, Chancellor, and MZMC, and arranged by Pinkslip, Inverness, and MZMC.

== Background and release ==
On January 3, 2022, Konnect Entertainment announced that Yuju will be making her solo debut with extended play Rec.. The following day, the promotional schedule was released. On January 5, "Play" was announced as the lead single for the extended play, in the same announcement, Yuju was announced to have written the lyrics and composed the song. On January 12, the first teaser for the music video was released. On January 17, the second teaser for the music video was released. On January 18, the song along with the music video was released.

== Composition ==
"Play" was written by Yuju alongside Chancellor, Amelia Moore, and MZMC, composed by Yuju, Chancellor, and MZMC, and arranged by Pinkslip, Inverness, and MZMC. Musically, the song is described as a medium-tempo emotional dance pop song with lyrics about "the demise of a relationship". "Play" was composed in the key of E minor, with a tempo of 98 beats per minute.

== Commercial performance ==
"Play" debuted at position 19 on South Korea's Gaon Download Chart in the chart issue dated January 16–22, 2022. The song also debuted at position 77 on the Gaon BGM Chart, in the chart issue dated January 16–22, 2022.

== Promotion ==
Prior to the extended play's release, on January 18, 2022, Yuju held an online press conference to introduce the extended play and its song including "Play". Following the release of the extended play, she performed "Play" on three music programs on the first week: KBS2's Music Bank on January 21, MBC's Show! Music Core on January 22, and SBS's Inkigayo on January 23. On the second week of the song release, she performed on SBS MTV's The Show on January 25.

== Credits and personnel ==
Credits adapted from Melon.

Studio

- Vibe Music – recording
- Klang Studio – mixing
- 821 Sound Mastering – mastering

Personnel

- Yuju – vocals, lyrics, composition
- Chancellor – lyrics, composition, recording producer
- Amelia Moore – lyrics
- MZMC – lyrics, composition, arrangement
- Pinkslip – arrangement
- Inverness – arrangement
- KayOne – recording engineer
- Koo Jong-pil – mixing
- Kwon Nam-woo – mastering

== Charts ==
Chart performance for "Play"
Chart (2022)	Peak position
South Korea (Gaon Download)	19

== Release history ==
Release dates and formats for "Play"
Region	Date	Format	Label
Various	January 18, 2022	Digital download; streaming	Konnect; Warner Music
