= O (EP) =

- Digital cover

EP by Yuju
- Released: March 7, 2023
- Genre: K-pop
- Length: 14:54
- Language: Korean
- Label: Konnect

Yuju chronology
Rec. (2022)	O (2023)

Singles from O
- 1. "Without U" Released: March 7, 2023

O is the second extended play by South Korean singer Yuju. It was released by Konnect Entertainment on March 7, 2023, and contains five tracks, including the lead single "Without U".

== Background and release ==
On February 14, 2023, Konnect Entertainment announced Yuju would be releasing her second extended play titled O on March 7, the promotional schedule was also released on the same day. On February 16, the mood teaser video was released. On February 27, the track listing was released with "Without U" announced as the lead single. On March 1, the highlight medley video was released. Two days later, the music video teaser for lead single "Without U" was released.

== Track listing ==
Track listing for O
No.	Title	Lyrics	Music	Arrangement	Length
1.	"9 Years"	Yuju	Yuju	Sesame	2:57
2.	"Without U"	Yuju	Ginette Claudette; Dimitri Gountounas; Mike Woods; Kevin White; Rudy Sandapa; Kaelyn Behr; Mzmc	Rudy Sandapa; Styalz Fuego; Mzmc	3:37
3.	"Dreaming" (꿈)	Yuju	Amelia Moore; Kyle Buckley; Charles Nelsen; John Blanda; Mzmc	Pink Slip; Inverness; John Blanda; Mzmc	3:02
4.	"Peach Blossom" (복숭아꽃; feat. Sokodomo)	Yuju; Sokodomo	Yuju; Sokodomo	Sokodomo; Purple	2:39
5.	"Full Circle"	Yuju	Yuju; Knave; Paulina "Pau" Cerrilla; Shintaro Yasuda; David Park	Shintaro Yasuda; David Park	2:39
Total length:					14:54

== Charts ==
Chart performance for O
Chart (2023)	Peak position
South Korean Albums (Circle)	15

== Release history ==
Release history for O
Region	Date	Format	Label
South Korea	March 7, 2023	CD	Konnect
Various	March 7, 2023	Digital download; streaming	Konnect
