= Craxy =

South Korean girl group

- Origin: Seoul, South Korea
- Genre: K-pop
- Years active: 2020–present
- Label: Level ENM
- Members: Wooah; Karin; Hyejin; Swan
- Past members: ChaeY

Craxy (Korean: 크랙시; stylized in all caps), formerly known as Wish Girls, is a South Korean four-member girl group formed by Level ENM in late 2018. The group consists of four members: Woo-Ah, KaRin, Hye Jin, and Swan. Craxy was originally a five-piece ensemble; member ChaeY left the group. They debuted on March 3, 2020, with their extended play (EP) My Universe.

== Name ==
During an interview with SBS show HANBAM!, Swan described the group name "CRAXY" as a combination of 'crack', to signify cracking up prejudices, and 'sexy', referring to the eye-catching charm of the members.

== History ==
=== 2020: Debut and Rookie Year ===
On February 13, 2020, the group announced that they would debut on March 1 with their album My Universe, which would consist of ten tracks, including all of their pre-debut songs and the title track, "Aria". The official music video for "Aria" was released on March 3, 2020 and features the members of CRAXY portraying historical Korean figures of various eras.

=== 2021–present: Zero story concept and rebirth with XX ===
My Universe would be followed up with a number of singles and mini-albums in 2021 and 2022, starting with the single album ZERO in 2021, featuring title track "GAIA". ZERO was followed up on February 24, 2022, with ZERO 2 including title track "Dance with God". On August 16, 2022, CRAXY released their third mini-album titled Who Am I in 2022, featuring the title track "Undercover".

On November 10, 2022, the digital single "Poison Rose" was released. Initially slated for release on 31 October, "Poison Ivy" was delayed to respect the national mourning period following the Itaewon disaster.

On March 23, 2023, CRAXY's 4th mini-album, XX, was released, which included "Poison Rose" and new title track "NUGUDOM". Leading up to the release of XX, CRAXY removed much of their previous content on social media sites, advising that they wished to "return to the beginning and reorganize everything" including "image, to stage concept, to worldview - everything except the group name." "NUGUDOM" received particular attention across the global K-Pop community for directly confronting those who mock artists that are less famous.

On May 9, 2023, digital single "No Limit", a rap track from the album XX, was released.

On July 31, 2023, ChaeY was removed from the group due to the company's decision.

On June 26, 2024, CRAXY released their 1st SINGLE ALBUM [𝗥𝗘_].

Concert promoter Leo Presents has announced that CRAXY will take part in the KPOP Breakout Tour, along with the groups Ichillin' and Trendz, as well as soloist U-CHAE, that is scheduled to happen fall 2024, with dates across Canada and the United States yet to be announced.

== Members ==
Active

- Wooah (우아)
- Karin (카린)
- Hyejin (혜진)
- Swan (수안)

Former

- ChaeY (채이)

== Discography ==
=== Extended plays ===
Title	Album details	Peak chart positions	Sales
Title	Album details	KOR	Sales
My Universe	Released: March 3, 2020; Label: SAI Entertainment; Formats: CD, download, streaming	—	
Zero 2	Released: February 24, 2022; Label: SAI Entertainment; Formats: CD, download, streaming	—	
Who Am I	Released: August 16, 2022; Label: SAI Entertainment; Formats: CD, download, streaming	61	KOR: 1,850
XX	Released: March 23, 2023; Label: SAI Entertainment; Formats: CD, download, streaming	38	KOR: 5,178
"—" denotes album did not chart.

=== Single albums ===
Title	Details	Peak positions	Sales
Title	Details	KOR	Sales
Zero	Released: October 7, 2021; Label: SAI Entertainment; Formats: Download, streaming; Track listing: 1. "GAIA"; 2. "CRAXY Theme - Piano Version"; 3. "CRAXY Theme - Orchestral Version"; 4. "CRAXY Theme - Trailer Version"; 5. "GAIA - Instrumental"	—	
`RE_`	Released: June 26, 2024; Label: Level ENM; Formats: CD, digital download; Track listing: 1. "Crazy Racer"; 2. "Stupidz"; 3. "Daisy(03/06)"; 4. "Stupidz - Instrumental"	61	KOR: 1,754

=== Singles ===
Title	Year	Peak chart positions	Album
Title	Year	KOR Down.	Album
"My Universe" (나의 우주)	2020	—	My Universe
"Aria"	2020	—	My Universe
"Gaia" (가이아)	2021	—	Zero
"Dance with God"	2022	—	Zero 2
"Trigger"	2022	—	Zero 2
"Undercover"	2022	—	Who Am I
"Requiem"	2022	—	Who Am I
"Poison Rose"	2022	—	Non-album single
"Nugudom"	2023	122	XX
"No Limit"	2023	—	Non-album single
"Stupidz"	2024	—	Re_
