= Balwinder Safri =

Punjabi folk singer (1958–2022)

- Born: December 15, 1958; Kapurthala, Punjab, India
- Died: July 26, 2022 (aged 63); Wolverhampton, UK.
- Occupation: Singer
- Spouse: Nikki Davitt

Balwinder Safri (15 December 1958 – 26 July 2022) was a United Kingdom–based Punjabi folk singer and Bhangra artist, active since the 1980s. He was the founder of Safri Boyz Band, formed in 1990. He was best known as Bhangra Star for his contribution to Punjabi music industry. A few of his hit songs include "O Chan Mere Makhna", "Pao Bhangra", "Gal Sun Kuriye", "Nachdi nu", 'Rab Dian Rakhan" (1996), "Ishq Nachavye Gali Gali" (1996) and "Laali" (1998).

Safri underwent triple bypass surgery and suffered brain damage while at New Cross Hospital. He died on 26 July 2022 in Wolverhampton, UK, shortly after being discharged from the hospital.

== Early life ==
Balwinder Safri was born on 15 December 1958 in Kapurthala, Punjab, India, to Gyan Singh, a religious singer who performed Gurbani and Shabad Kirtan at gurdwaras. Safri developed an interest in music during childhood, accompanying his father to gurdwaras. He sang patriotic songs in school assemblies and competitions. Safri trained in Indian classical music under guru Jaswant Bhawra and earned a degree in music from Randhir College, Kapurthala. His nickname “Safri” originated from a school teacher’s taunt about his restless nature, which he later adopted professionally.

In 1980, Safri immigrated to Canada, working as a tailor in a cloth manufacturing factory during the week and performing with music groups like Azad Group and Ashoka Group on weekends. In 1991, he relocated to Birmingham, UK, where he became a prominent figure in the British Asian music scene.

== Career ==
Safri began his professional music career in 1985 with a television performance of the Punjabi song “Jad Lagiya Chotta Ishqiya Diya.” In 1990, he formed the Safri Boyz Band with five members, including Bhupinder Kullar.

The band gained popularity in India, Canada, and the UK with albums such as Safri Bomb The Tumbi Remix (1995), Kar Shukar Khuda Da (1994), Another Level (1999), Inferno (2000), Get Real (2010), and Jadon Mann Dole Tera (2014). Notable songs include “O Chan Mere Makhna” (1998), “Pao Bhangra” (2009), “Tere Ishqe Ne” (1999), “Rahe Rahe Jaan Waliye” (2010), and “Mere Dil Te Alana Paya” (2010).

== Personal life ==
Safri followed Sikhism and was married to Nikki Davitt, whom he met in 2010. He had a stepdaughter, Priya Kumari, and reportedly two children from a previous marriage. His younger brother, Avtar Singh Safri, is also a singer.

== Health and death ==
In April 2022, Safri underwent triple bypass surgery at New Cross Hospital, Wolverhampton, UK, following chest pains. Complications led to brain damage and a coma. After 86 days in critical care, he was discharged to a rehabilitation centre but died on 26 July 2022, at age 63.

His family raised concerns about hospital care, alleging neglect, though the Royal Wolverhampton NHS Trust cited patient confidentiality in declining to comment.

Following his death, Punjabi artists including Diljit Dosanjh, Mika Singh, Bally Sagoo, Gurdas Maan, Neeru Bajwa, and Jassie Gill paid tributes on social media. Former Punjab Chief Minister Captain Amarinder Singh tweeted condolences, calling Safri a “Punjabi music legend.”
