= After Sunset =

- Digital cover

EP by Highlight
- Released: 7 November 2022
- Genre: K-pop
- Length: 15:47
- Language: Korean
- Labels: Around Us; Genie Music; Stone Music

Highlight chronology
Daydream (2022)	After Sunset (2022)	Switch On (2024)

Singles from After Sunset
- 1. "Alone" Released: 7 November 2022

After Sunset is the fourteenth EP by South Korean boy group Highlight. It was released on 7 November 2022, by Around US Entertainment and distributed by Kakao Entertainment. The mini-album contains five tracks, featuring "Alone" as a promotional single. Three photobook versions of the EP were released, titled Night, Midnight, and Dawn. A jewel case version was also included for each of the four members.

== Background and album ==
The group first announced their comeback through a clip at their 2022 fan concert, Highlight Sports Day. On October 16, the second day of the concert, the end credits were followed by a snippet of the song Alone and the date 7 November 2022.

The album and single name were revealed to be After Sunset and Alone respectively, through a trailer video on October 24, confirming their comeback on 7 November. The track list, promotional photos for each album version, and song previews were shown in the subsequent days leading up to the EP's release. It consists of five songs, three of which were co-written and co-produced by member Lee Gikwang.

"Alone" is described as "a pop track with a retro texture and minimalistic colour, and a retro feel at the same time." The lyrics are also said to "[express] a straightforward confession and a double message."

== Track listing ==
After Sunset track listing
No.	Title	Lyrics	Music	Arrangement	Length
1.	"Alone"	BXN	BXN	BXN	3:03
2.	"Paper Cut"	KZ, Taeyoung Kim, Dint	KZ, Taeyoung Kim, Dint, David Simon	KZ, Taeyoung Kim	3:15
3.	"S.I.L.Y (Say I Love You)"	Lee Gikwang, Park Sol, NOD	Lee Gikwang, Park Sol, NOD	NOD	3:03
4.	"Privacy"	VO3E, Lee Gikwang, Kim Geungjeong, ZNEE	VO3E, MLC, Michelle Jo (Singing Beetle), Lee Gikwang	VO3E	3:02
5.	"I Don't Miss You"	Sooyoon, Lee Gikwang	Moon Kim, Lee Gikwang, $ÜN (Sun), Bae Minsu	$ÜN (Sun), Bae Minsu	3:22
Total length:					15:47

== Charts ==
=== Weekly charts ===
Weekly chart performance for After Sunset
Chart (2022)	Peak position
Japanese Digital Albums (Oricon)	30
Japanese Hot Albums (Billboard Japan)	80
South Korean Albums (Circle)	2

=== Monthly charts ===
Monthly chart performance for Cheshire
Chart (2022)	Peak position
South Korean Albums (Circle)	5
