= Aimers (band) =

South Korean boy band

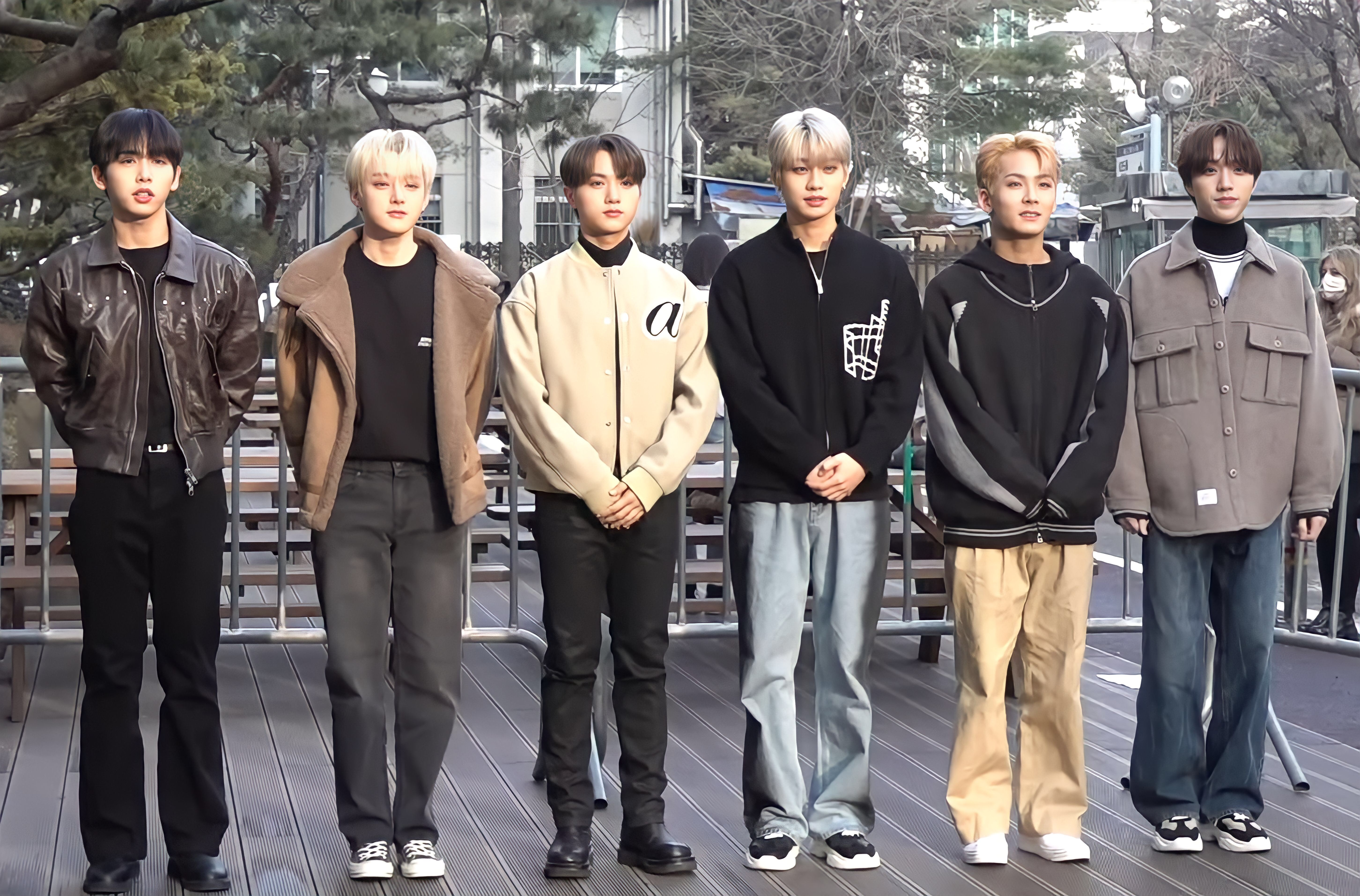
- Aimers in February 2023

Background information
- Origin: South Korea
- Genre: K-pop
- Years active: 2022–present
- Label: Hyper Rhythm
- Members: Seunghyun; Eunjun; Doryun; Yoel; Seunghwan; Wooyoung

AIMERS (에이머스), formerly known as B3o1z and 1st Aimers, is a South Korean boy band formed by the label HYPER RYTHM. The group consists of six members: Seunghyun, Eunjun, Doryun, Yoel, Seunghwan and Wooyoung. The group made their debut on 17 November 2022 with the mini-album ‘STAGE 0. BETTING STARTS’.

== History ==
=== 2021–2022: Formation and pre-debut period ===
The group gradually took shape from 2021 onwards, under the name ‘1st AIMERS’. The first members to be introduced to the public were Seunghyun and Eunjun (former members of the group Spectrum). In April 2022, the project changed its name to “B3o1z”, and several other members were introduced.

In June 2022, B3o1z released the single “Albamon Go!”, linked to the programme of the same name broadcast on YouTube.

The project subsequently adopted the name AIMERS. The group made their official debut on 17 November 2022 with the mini-album STAGE 0. BETTING STARTS, comprising four tracks: ‘INTRO: BETTING STARTS’, ‘NEMO’, ‘Fight Inside’ and ‘Colours’.

=== 2023: first releases and debut in Japan ===
On 27 January 2023, AIMERS released the special single ‘Fireworks’, accompanied by an English version of the same track.

On 12 May, the group released their first single album, ‘Bubbling’, comprising the songs ‘Cherish’ and ‘Bubble’.

In October, AIMERS made their Japanese debut with a Japanese version of ‘Bubbling’, released on 10 October. To mark the occasion, the group held their first Japanese showcase on 9 October in Tokyo, during which they performed, amongst other tracks, the Japanese versions of ‘Bubble’ and ‘Cherish’.

=== 2024: Somebody and appearance at Re ===
On 15 February 2024, AIMERS made their return to South Korea with their second single album, ‘Somebody’, which includes the title track ‘Somebody’ and ‘Where We Go’.

The group continues its activities in Japan and organises the AIMERS JAPAN MINI LIVE 2024 –Somebody– concert in Tokyo on 5 April. It also announces its participation in KCON JAPAN 2024, where it performs in May.

In August 2024, AIMERS were announced as one of the groups taking part in the South Korean–Japanese music reality TV show Re. (Re:Born). The programme brings together several K-pop groups who have already made their debut in South Korea and gives them the opportunity to compete for greater visibility in Japan. AIMERS finished fourth in the competition, which was won by DKB.

The group then released several tracks, including ‘Timeout’, taken from the soundtrack of the series Social Savvy Class 101, in November, followed by the special winter single ‘Confetti’ on 18 December.

=== 2025: new music releases ===
On 10 April 2025, AIMERS released the single ‘Starry Night’. The following day, the group contributed the track ‘Dive Into You’ to the soundtrack of the series FIRST LOVE.

On 25 September, AIMERS released their second Korean mini-album, FULL COUNT, which included the tracks “Called Game”, “Truth & Dare”, “As Much As I Love You” and “Summer Rain”.

In October and November, the group embarked on their first Japanese tour, entitled AIMERS 1st Special Tour in Japan – FULL COUNT –.

=== 2026: new activities ===
On 11 November 2026, AIMERS released their first digital single, 1:∞, featuring the tracks ‘100’ and ‘Man on Fire’. Only three members of the group (Yoel, Seunghwan and Wooyoung) took part in this project, whilst the other three (Seunghyun, Eunjun and Doryun) are completing their military service.

They also announced that they would be appearing on the programme SHOW KPOP on 16 November 2026, alongside other groups such as A2O SOUL and UNCHILD.

== Members ==
| Stage name | Birth name | Date of birth | Nationality | Positions |
|---|---|---|---|---|
| Seunghyun (승현) | Lee Seung-hyun (이승현) | July 17th 1998 | South Korean | Leader, Dancer, Rapper |
| Eunjun (은준) | Choi Eun-jun (최은준) | August 6th 1999 | South Korean | Main singer |
| Doryun (도륜) | Kim Dor-yun (김도륜) | May 1st 2000 | South Korean | Singer |
| Yoel (요엘) | Kim Yo-el (김요엘) | January 25th 2001 | South Korean | Singer, Dancer |
| Seunghwan (승환) | Park Seung-hwan (박승환) | April 6th 2002 | South Korean | Singer, Dancer |
| Wooyoung (우영) | Hwang Woo-young (황우영) | June 29th 2003 | South Korean | Singer, Dancer |

== Discography ==
=== Extended plays ===
| Title | EP details | Peak chart position | Sales |
| Title | EP details | KOR | Sales |
|---|---|---|---|
| Stage 0. Betting Starts | Released: November 17, 2022; Label: Hyper Rhythm; Formats: CD, digital download, streaming | 77 | KOR: 3,212 |
| Full Count | Released: September 25, 2025; Label: Hyper Rhythm; Formats: CD, digital download, streaming | — | KOR: |

=== Single albums ===
| Title | Album details | Peak chart position | Sales |
| Title | Album details | KOR | Sales |
|---|---|---|---|
| Fireworks | Released: January 27, 2023; Label: Hyper Rhythm; Formats: SMC, digital download, streaming | 52 | KOR: 7,940 |
| Bubbling | Released: May 12, 2023; Label: Hyper Rhythm; Formats: CD, digital download, streaming | 57 | KOR: 3,667 |
| Somebody | Released: February 15, 2024; Label: Danal; Formats: Digital download, streaming | 23 | KOR: 8,914 |
| Starry Night | Released: April 10, 2025; Label: Danal; Formats: Digital download, streaming | 15 | KOR: 9,007 |

=== Singles ===
| Title | Year | Album |
|---|---|---|
| "Fight Inside" | 2022 | Stage 0. Betting Starts |
| "Fireworks" | 2023 | Fireworks |
| "Bubble" | 2023 | Bubbling |
| "Somebody" | 2024 | Somebody |
| "Confetti" | 2024 | Non-album singles |
| "Starry Night" | 2025 | Starry Night |
| "Called Game" | 2025 | Full Count |
