= Into the Light (EP) =

- Digital cover

EP by Lightsum
- Released: May 24, 2022
- Genre: K-pop
- Length: 15:22
- Language: Korean
- Labels: Cube; Kakao

Lightsum chronology
Light a Wish (2021)	Into the Light (2022)	Honey or Spice (2023)

Singles from Into the Light
- 1. "Alive" Released: May 24, 2022

Into the Light is the first extended play by South Korean girl group Lightsum. The EP was released by Cube Entertainment on May 24, 2022, and contains five tracks, including the lead single "Alive". This was the final release to feature former members Huiyeon and Jian, before their departures from the group on October 25, 2022.

== Background and release ==
On May 9, 2022, Cube Entertainment announced Lightsum would be releasing their first extended play titled Into the Light on May 24. A day later, the promotional schedule was released. On May 13, the track listing was released with "Alive" announced as the lead single. On May 19, a promotional video titled "Synergy" was released, followed by the release of an audio snippet video a day later. The music video teaser for "Alive" was released on May 22–23.

== Commercial performance ==
Into the Light debuted at number 13 on South Korea's Gaon Album Chart in the chart issue dated May 22–28, 2022; on the monthly chart, the EP debuted at number 39 in the chart issue for May 2022 with 17,902 copies sold.

== Promotion ==
Prior to the extended play's release, on May 24, 2022, Lightsum held a live event to introduce the EP and communicate with their fans.

== Track listing ==
Track listing for Into the Light
No.	Title	Lyrics	Music	Arrangement	Length
1.	"Alive"	Star Wars (Galactika)	Star Wars (Galactika); Atenna (Galactika); Woo Bin (Galactika)	Team Galactika	3:06
2.	"I"	Star Wars (Galactika)	Star Wars (Galactika); Woo Bin (Galactika); Pablo (Galactika); Atenna (Galactika); Alina Smith (Lyre); Gisselle Acevedo; Jake Barker; Senija Hadzich	Team Galactika	2:52
3.	"Good News"	Atenna (Galactika); Star Wars (Galactika); Ejae; Kim Hyun-joong	Ogi (Galactika)	Team Galactika	3:24
4.	"Q"	Wwwave (PaperMaker)	Wwwave (PaperMaker)	Wwwave (PaperMaker)	2:42
5.	"Bye Bye Love"	1Take (NewType); Tak (NewType); Arran (NewType)	1Take (NewType); Tak (NewType)	1Take (NewType); Tak (NewType)	3:18
Total length:					15:22

== Charts ==
=== Weekly charts ===
Weekly chart performance for Into the Light
Chart (2022)	Peak positions
South Korean Albums (Gaon)	13

=== Monthly charts ===
Monthly chart performance for Into the Light
Chart (2022)	Peak position
South Korean Albums (Gaon)	39

== Sales ==
Sales for Into the Light
Region	Sales
South Korea	17,902

== Release history ==
Release history for Into the Light
Region	Date	Format	Label
South Korea	May 24, 2022	CD	Cube; Kakao
Various	May 24, 2022	Digital download; streaming	Cube; Kakao
