= Sornphet Sornsuphan =

Thai singer (1948–2022)

Sornphet Sornsuphan ศรเพชร ศรสุพรรณ
- Born: Boonthan Klaylamang; 27 March 1948; Suphan Buri province, Thailand
- Died: 8 January 2022 (aged 73) Bangkok, Thailand
- Genre: Luk thung
- Years active: 1972–2022
- Labels: Rota; RS Promotion

Sornphet Sornsuphan (Thai: ศรเพชร ศรสุพรรณ; né Boonthan Klaylamang, Thai: บุญทัน คล้ายละมั่ง; 27 March 1948 – 8 January 2022) was a Thai luk thung singer.

== Life and career ==
Sornsuphan finished his education at Primary 4. He started as a performer of Thai music in "Cheer Ram Wong" (Thai: เชียร์รำวง) of Dam Daen-Suphan, with Lieang Kanchana who supported him on stage.

Next, he was in khew with Phophin Phornsuphan. Phophin wrote songs for him, and was famous in 1970–1976. His popular music includes "Ai Wang Tai Nae" (ไอ้หวังตายแน่), "'Khaw Mai Mee Khai" (ข้าวไม่มีขาย), "Aa Phai Hai Rieam" (อภัยให้เรียม), "Khao Wen Roae" (เข้าเวรรอ) and "Oum Look Tam Miea" (อุ้มลูกตามเมีย). Many his song composed and lyricist by Phophin and Kiat Chalermchai.

From 2010, he had been in poor health, and had not appeared on stage. He died on 8 January 2022, at the age of 73.

== Discography ==
- Ai Wang Tai Nae (ไอ้หวังตายแน่)
- Khaw Mai Mee Khai (ข้าวไม่มีขาย)
- Aa Phai Hai Rieam (อภัยให้เรียม)
- Khao Wen Roae (เข้าเวรรอ)
- Oum Look Tam Miea (อุ้มลูกตามเมีย)
- Koay Sao Na (คอยสาวนา)
- Pee Mai Yom (พี่ไม่ยอม)
- Rak Ma Haa Pee (รักมาห้าปี)
