= Confess (band) =

Iranian metal band

- Origin: Tehran, Iran
- Genres: Groove metal; thrash metal; nu metal
- Years active: 2010–2015; 2018–present
- Label: Opposite Records
- Members: Nikan Khosravi; Arash Ilkhani

Confess is an Iranian groove/thrash metal band. They are known for having faced charges in Iran for their music, in which they expressed anti-religious and anti-government views. The band, at the time a duo, received prison sentences totalling 14.5 years.

== History ==
Confess was formed in 2010 by Nikan Khosravi, who was later joined by Arash Ilkhani. They define their music as groove, nu metal, NWOAHM, and thrash. The duo released two albums before they were arrested on 10 November 2015 and held in solitary confinement.

=== Criminal charges and conviction ===
After their arrest, the duo potentially faced execution after being charged with blasphemy for "writing Satanic music and speaking to foreign radio stations". Their second album, In Pursuit of Dreams, included tracks entitled "Teh-Hell-Ran" and "I'm Your God Now", words that are considered blasphemous by Iran's hardline Islamic government.

The full charges levelled against the band reportedly included blasphemy; advocating against the system; forming and running an illegal band and record label "in the Satanic metal & rock music style"; writing anti-religious, atheist, political, and anarchistic lyrics; and conducting interviews with "forbidden" foreign radio stations.

As of January 2017, according to Raha Bahreini, Amnesty International's researcher on Iran, no band members were facing execution. Khosravi and Ilkhani petitioned for political asylum in Norway and their petition was granted.

On 9 July 2019, the Islamic Revolutionary Court of Tehran handed Khosravi and Ilkhani a combined sentence of 14 1/2 years in prison for the crime of playing metal. Khosravi was also sentenced to 74 lashes.

=== Life in Norway and new music ===
Currently, the two live in Norway, where they continue to make music. They have added two local musicians, Erling Malm and Roger Tunheim Jakobsen, to their touring lineup. In November 2019, they released the song "Army of Pigs!", with plans to issue their next album, titled Revenge at All Costs. After a two-year delay, Revenge at All Costs was released on 21 January 2022.

== Band members ==
- Nikan "Siyanor" Khosravi – vocals, guitar (2010–present)
- Arash "Chemical" Ilkhani – bass (2011–2012), DJ, sampler (2014–present)

== Discography ==
Studio albums

- Beginning of Dominion (2012)
- In Pursuit of Dreams (2015)
- Revenge at All Costs (2022)
- Destination Addiction (2025)

EPs

- Back to My Future (2014)

Singles

- "Encase Your Gun" (2012)
- "Painted of Pain" (2012)
- "Edge of Mind" (2013)
- "Phoenix Rises" (2018)
- "Evin" (2019)
- "Army of Pigs!" (2019)
- "Evin (live)" (2020)
- "Eat What You Kill" (2020)
- "Megalodon" (2021)
- "Ransom Note" (2021)
- "Slaughterhouse" (2024)
- "Expedition" (2024)
