= Ebrahim Qanbari-Mehr =

Iranian musical instrument maker (1928–2022)

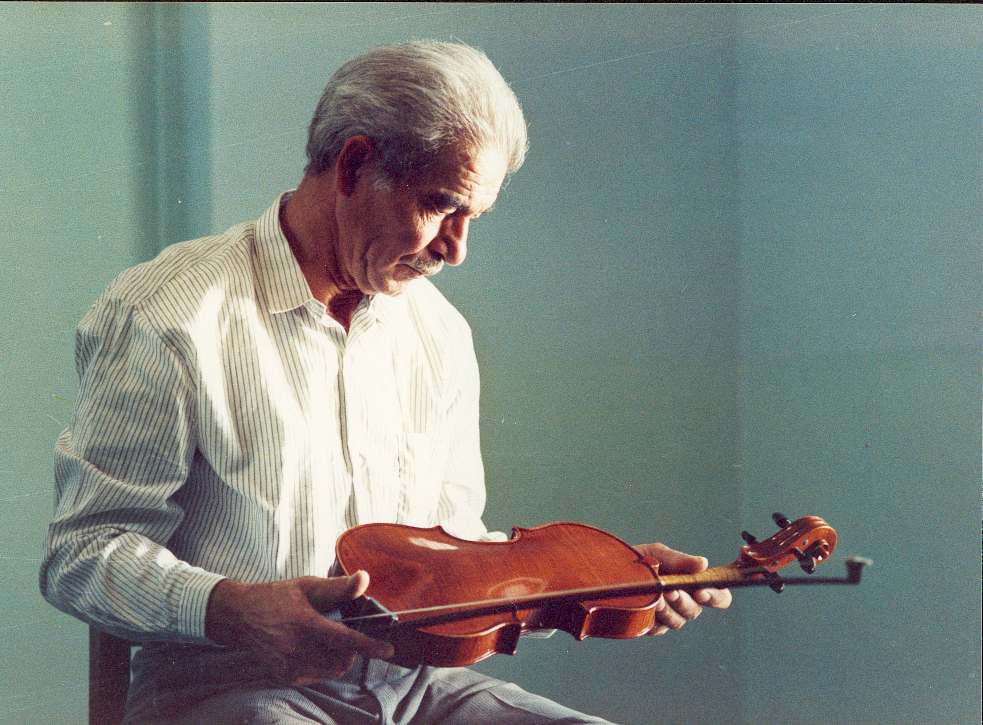
- Born: September 1928; Tehran, Iran
- Died: 12 August 2022 (aged 93)
- Education: Abolhasan Saba
- Known for: Musical instrument maker

Ebrahim Qanbari-Mehr (Persian: ابراهیم قنبری‌مهر; September 1928 – August 12, 2022) was an Iranian musical instrument maker.

== Biography ==
When he was six, his father died, resulting in a deterioration of the family's financial situation. Consequently, at the age of 11, after completing the fifth grade of primary school, he made the decision to leave school and pursue work in various trades such as metalworking, forging, machining, and carpentry. His interest in music led him to learn from Abolhassan Saba, who generously taught him the violin without charging any fees. With time, he familiarized himself with the notation and techniques of both Iranian and Western music. Recognizing his talent, Saba proposed teaching him the craft of violin making. Together, they met Soren Araklyan, an immigrant from Russia and the author of Monverni, to gain insights into his musical ideas and research. Through Araklyan, Ganbari was introduced to the head of the Fine Arts Department, who offered him paid employment. Unfortunately, Saba died after a year.

In 1960, Ganbari traveled to the Watlo instrument-making school in France to further develop his skills. Atin Watlo, a renowned expert in percussion instruments during that time, taught there. During his time at the workshop, he had the opportunity to meet Soviet violist David Fyodorovich Oistrakh. Ganbari approached Walto and requested if Oistrakh could play his violin. Oistrakh's feedback was as follows:

"Congratulations for your eagerness, talent and perseverance which has been put into your extraordinary made violin, I've seen such a perfect instrument that has the qualities together. I wish you great success in the future"

Sincerely yours, David Oistrakh Paris, 16 June 1960

Ganbari successfully completed his master's degree in instrument-making and returned to Iran. Upon his return, he began inviting various craftsmen to collaborate in his workshop, with some accepting the offer, including Mr. Sanaati. This collaboration allowed Ganbari to increase his production of violins, with some specifically intended for art schools while the rest were sold to passionate enthusiasts.

In 1969, the Minister of Art and Culture organized an exhibition showcasing Iranian Instruments. During the exhibition, Ibrahim's violin captured the attention of a renowned violist who not only played the instrument but also purchased it directly. The violist went on to perform with the violin in numerous shows. Although some people speculated that the violin was crafted by Stradivari, the violist consistently clarified that it was made by an Iranian master named Ganbari.

Following the 1979 Iranian revolution, Ganbari retired and devoted his time to his small home workshop, primarily focused on refining the instrument's sound, thus continuously striving for optimization.

== Death ==
He died on 12 August 2022, at the age of 93.
