= Rec. =

- Digital cover

EP by Yuju
- Released: January 18, 2022
- Genre: K-pop
- Length: 15:10
- Language: Korean
- Label: Konnect; Warner Music

Yuju chronology
Rec. (2022)	O (2023)

Singles from Rec.
- 1. "Play" Released: January 18, 2022

Rec. (stylized as [REC.]; read as "recording") is the debut solo extended play (EP) by South Korean singer Yuju. It was released by Konnect Entertainment on January 18, 2022. The album consists of five songs, including the title track "Play". This is her first solo release since she joined Konnect Entertainment after GFriend's disbandment.

== Background and release ==
On September 1, 2021, following GFriend's disbandment and her departure from Source Music, Yuju signed an exclusive contract with Konnect Entertainment as a soloist.

On January 3, 2022, it was reported that Yuju will debut on January 18 with the extended play titled [REC.]. The following day, the schedule of the EP was released. Preorders began on January 5. On the same day, it was confirmed that the title track of the album is called "Play" and was written and composed by herself. On January 6, a concept film for the EP was published on Konnect Entertainment official YouTube channel. The day after, the track listing of the album was released, confirming that it has five songs, all written by Yuju herself. The next two days, two concept photos of Yuju were released: "Take 1" on January 8 and "Take 2" on January 9. On January 10, a lyric poster spoiled a lyric of the title track "Play" :

When the flowers bloom beautifully and turned red, You broke it and far away, you departed

— Yuju, "Play",

The first teaser for "Play" was released on January 12. The album sampler of the EP was released then two days later, followed by a live version of the sampler as a special gift on January 16. The following day, Konnect Entertainment revealed the second and final teaser for "Play".

The EP was released on January 18 along with the music video for "Play".

== Track listing ==
Track listing for Rec.
No.	Title	Lyrics	Music	Arrangement	Length
1.	"Bad Blood" (Intro)	Yuju; Chancellor	Musikality; Celine Svanbäck; Ferras Alqaisi; Jeppe London	Musikality; Jeppe London	1:20
2.	"Play" (놀이)	Yuju; Chancellor; Amelia Moore; MZMC	Yuju; Chancellor; MZMC	Pink Slip; Inverness; MZMC	3:22
3.	"Cold Winter" (겨우, 겨울; gyeou, gyeoul; lit. '"Barely, Winter"'; featuring Mad Clown)	Yuju; Chancellor; Mad Clown	Yuju; Chancellor	Heo In-kuk (Gallery); Yoon Je-hyuk (Gallery)	3:39
4.	"The Killa" (데킬라)	Yuju; Chancellor; Knave	Yuju; Chancellor; Purple; Jang Seong-il	Chancellor; Purple	3:21
5.	"Blue Nostalgia"	Yuju; Amelia Moore; JBach; Leroy Sanchez; Kyle Scherrer; MZMC	Yuju; MZMC; Leroy Sanchez; Kyle Scherrer	Pink Slip; Inverness; Dry Kyle; MZMC	3:28
Total length:					15:10

== Charts ==
=== Weekly charts ===
Chart performance for Rec.
Chart (2022)	Peak position
South Korean Albums (Gaon)	15

=== Monthly charts ===
Monthly chart performance for Rec.
Chart (2022)	Peak position
South Korean Albums (Gaon)	33

== Release history ==
Release dates and formats for Rec.
Region	Date	Format	Label	Ref.
Various	January 18, 2022	CD; digital download; streaming	Konnect; Warner Music	
