= Superkind =

South Korean boy group (2022–2025)

- Origin: Seoul, South Korea
- Genres: K-pop; J-pop; dance
- Years active: 2022–2025
- Label: Deep Studio
- Past members: Eugene; Geon; Daemon; Saejin; SiO; Seung; JDV

Superkind (Korean: 슈퍼카인드; stylized in all caps), was a South Korean boy band formed by Deep Studio Entertainment. The group originally consisted of five members: Eugene, Geon, Daemon, Saejin and SiO. Seung and JDV joined the group a few months after debut. They debuted on June 20, 2022, with the digital single album PlaySuperkind: Apply for a Beta Test and disbanded on April 11, 2025.

== Name ==
Superkind is an anagram of the words "Nuke", "Prid" and "S". Nuke are the virtual members, Prid are the real members, and S is something "mysterious" that unites them. The name reflects the group's quest to find the letter S and complete the anagram.

== History ==
=== 2019–2021: Yours Project ===
In 2019, Deep Studio Entertainment presented their pre-debut project called Yours Project. The company, which has specialized in deepfake technology since its founding in 2017, had intended to debut a virtual idol based on the 1998 virtual singer, Adam.

The company began recruiting real trainees for the project, in order to find out what fans wanted and how they should interact with them, to enhance the success of their project. The project was governed by fan voting, who could select which trainees they wanted to see on fancams and talk to them through a Discord server. However, the project was canceled in 2021 after the departure of several trainees.

In late 2021, the company replaced Yours Project's social media with Superkind's, and revealed the virtual member of the group, Saejin, in November.

=== 2023–2025: Debut, subsequent releases and disbandment ===
Saejin's debut trailer was released in January 2022, and the remaining four members were revealed in March. The group debuted on June 20 with the digital single PlaySuperkind: Apply for a Beta Test. The group was described as "the first decentralized K-pop entertainment" in which their fan club, called "Players", could decide how the group would develop and what concepts they wanted to see in their upcoming releases.

On July 27, 2022, JDV was announced as the new member of the group. On December 8, Seung, the second virtual member, was added to the group during the "Chapter 2: Take Me There" event.

On March 17, 2023, the group released their second digital single called PlaySuperkind: Player Gauge 200.

On October 18, Superkind released their first EP Profiles of the Future (Λ): 70% and its lead single "Beam me up (2Dx3D)".

On April 11, 2025, Superkind has disbanded following the termination of their contracts with Deep Studio.

== Past members ==
- Eugene (유진)
- Geon (건)
- Daemon (대이먼)
- Saejin (세진)
- SiO (시오)
- Seung (승)
- JDV (제이디비)

== Discography ==
=== Extended plays ===
List of extended plays, showing selected details, selected chart positions, and sales figures
Title	Details	Peak chart positions	Sales
Title	Details	KOR	Sales
Profiles of the Future (Λ): 70%	Released: October 18, 2023; Label: Deep Studio Entertainment; Formats: CD, digital download, streaming	21	KOR: 6,336

=== Singles ===
List of singles, showing year released and name of the album
Title	Year	Album
"Watch Out"	2022	PlaySuperkind: Apply for a Beta Test
"Moody"	2023	PlaySuperkind: Player Gauge 200
"Beam Me up (2Dx3D)"	2023	Profiles of the Future (Λ): 70%
