= Yuju (singer) =

South Korean singer (born 1997)

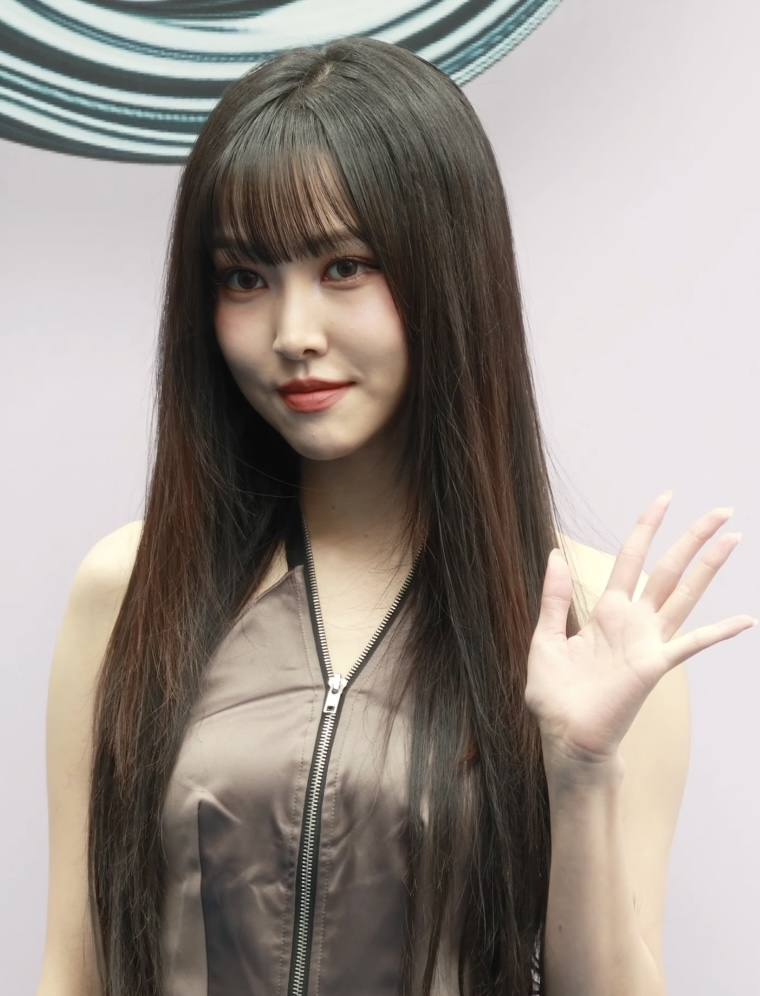
- Yuju in September 2024
- Born: Choi Yu-na; October 4, 1997 (age 29); Goyang, South Korea
- Education: Sungshin Women's University
- Occupations: Singer; songwriter
- Years active: 2015–present
- Musical career
- Genre: K-pop
- Instrument: Vocals
- Labels: Source; Konnect; At Area
- Member of: GFriend

Korean name
- Hangul: 최유나
- RR: Choe Yuna
- MR: Ch'oe Yuna

Stage name
- Hangul: 유주
- RR: Yuju
- MR: Yuju

Choi Yu-na (Korean: 최유나; born October 4, 1997), better known by her stage name Yuju (유주), is a South Korean singer-songwriter. She rose to fame in 2015 as a member of the South Korean girl group GFriend and became known for her vocals, having participated in various singing competitions. After GFriend's exclusive contract ended, Yuju debuted as a solo artist with the extended play (EP) Rec. in 2022 and took creative control over her works.

Yuju's accolades include individual awards from the K-Global Heart Dream Awards, Hanteo Music Awards, and Seoul Music Awards. Her chart-topping duet song "Spring Is Gone by Chance" for the television series A Girl Who Sees Smells soundtrack won Best OST at the 2015 Melon Music Awards.

== Early life and education ==
Yuju was born Choi Yu-na on October 4, 1997 in Goyang, South Korea, as the youngest of two daughters in her family. From an early age, Yuju enjoyed sports, dancing and singing. In her first year of middle school, Yuju won a singing contest encouragement award without formal training. Afterwards, Yuju attended a vocal academy to pursue singing and learned to play guitar due to her interest in composing. Yuju gained more performance experience in city and provincial competitions since her second year of middle school.

After graduating from the School of Performing Arts Seoul, Yuju enrolled at Sungshin Women's University to study Contemporary Practical Music.

== Career ==
=== 2011–2014: Pre-debut ===
In 2011, Yuju competed in the first season of K-pop Star, where she was eliminated in the first round. That same year, Yuju became a trainee at Cube Entertainment, but she left after four months when her vocal project team was cut. Yuju then trained for around a year and a half at LOEN Entertainment. Concurrently, Yuju showcased her vocal improvement at music events, winning the Gyeonggi Arts Festival excellence award and grand prize in 2011 and 2012, respectively. After leaving LOEN, Yuju won gold in the solo category of the 2013 Dong-A Student Song Festival, a nationwide competition. She eventually auditioned for and signed with Source Music in 2014, totaling around three years of training at agencies.

=== 2015–2021: GFriend ===
In January 2015, Yuju made her debut as a member of GFriend with the lead single "Glass Bead" from EP Season of Glass. Her stage name, given by the CEO, signifies "owner" and has the added meaning of being an owner of powerful singing ability.

In April 2015, Yuju and Loco released "Spring Is Gone by Chance" for the soundtrack of South Korean television drama A Girl Who Sees Smells. The song placed first on the Music Bank OST chart for ten consecutive weeks, won Best OST at the 2015 Melon Music Awards, and was the fourteenth best-performing single in South Korea that year. An acoustic version of the song was also released. Moreover, "Spring Is Gone by Chance" regularly re-enters domestic music charts in spring, establishing itself as a seasonal song. The soundtrack later achieved 100 million streams and 2.5 million downloads on Gaon.

In July 2015, Yuju drew interest on MBC's King of Mask Singer for her singing prowess as the youngest contestant at the time. Soon after, GFriend released their second single "Me Gustas Tu". During the promotions of the song, a fan-taken video of members falling eight times while performing on a slippery stage went viral, gaining international attention. The group was praised for their professionalism, especially Yuju, who suffered a twisted finger during the performance. The event boosted the group's popularity, and Gfriend continued to see commercial success as their next song "Rough" won 15 times on music show programs.

Yuju recorded "Billy & The Brave Guys" for the soundtrack of the animated movie Chicken Hero, which was released on February 18, 2016. In March 2016, she collaborated with Sunyoul of Up10tion for a song called "Cherish".

In October 2017, Yuju and Wheesung were declared as the final winners of SBS' Fantastic Duo 2 stars special, performing their winning piece "Even Thought of Marriage". She was the first and only K-pop female idol to win on the said television show's special. Following that, Yuju's collaboration song with Jihoo of IZ titled "Heart Signal" was released.

In June 2018, Yuju released her first solo digital single "Love Rain" featuring Suran.

In May 2021, Yuju became the host and protagonist of web show Yuju is Halli Queen, as the defending champion in Halli Galli. On May 5, Yuju served as MC for the KBS Korean Children's Song Contest. On May 22, Yuju left Source Music upon the end of GFriend's exclusive contract.

=== 2021–present: Solo debut with Rec. ===
On September 1, 2021, Yuju signed an exclusive contract with Konnect Entertainment, following GFriend's dissolution and departure from Source Music. On November 24, Yuju released a remake of Jo Sung-mo's "By Your Side", a Lovers in Paris soundtrack hit, as part of the "Cyworld BGM 2021" project.

Yuju debuted as a soloist on January 18, 2022, with the extended play Rec. and its lead single "Play" (놀이). In July 2022, music production and publishing company MZMC Inc. Korea shared that Yuju joined the team, having written Yurina Kawaguchi's "Look at Me" Korean version lyrics. On July 28, 2022, she released her second digital single "Evening" featuring rapper Big Naughty. From August to December 2022, Yuju was a fixed radio DJ at KBS Cool FM's Station Z. In December 2022, it was revealed Yuju sang the main theme song for Lotte World's Magic Matches and the Dreaming Night, a stage adaptation of "The Little Match Girl".

On February 13, 2023, it was announced Yuju would be releasing her second extended play titled O, alongside the lead single "Without U" on March 7. On August 16, 2023, Yuju released the single "Rewind" as part of the +memory project. On September 8, 2023, it was announced that Yuju would be releasing her new single "Dalala" on September 20. Yuju decided not to renew her contract with Konnect after it expired mid-April 2024. In late 2024, Yuju became a mentor for the Korean-Taiwanese boy group survival program Scool.

In early 2025, Yuju participated in GFriend's tenth anniversary reunion, which included the single album Season of Memories and concert tour. On March 12, Yuju signed an exclusive contract with At Area. On August 12, Yuju released her third extended play In Bloom, with the lead single "Reply".

On April 29, 2026, Yuju released the single "First Love Is a Curse". On October 24, Yuju's fourth extended play File. 07 was released, with its lead single "Nameless" (미제).

== Artistry ==
Yuju didn't aim to become a singer-songwriter professionally at first. She started writing lyrics and composing for her own satisfaction by writing notes, recording melodies on her phone, and experimenting with self-recording in a studio. After signing as a soloist in 2021, Yuju said her deeper involvement in music-making came naturally, with encouragement from company employees and composers. She co-wrote each song on her solo debut EP Rec. and was the sole lyricist on her second EP O. A major turning point was Yuju's digital single "Dalala," her first lead single as the main composer and sole lyricist. The appeal of creating "Dalala" influenced Yuju's career direction: "I want my songs to go through my hands. I want to be an artist who is not too dependent."

Yuju explained she actively writes lyrics since "singing is ultimately about putting sound into words." She tries not to differentiate lyrics from her usual way of speaking. To draft diverse lyrics, Yuju reads books and meets people to understand their life stories. Yuju's songwriting is also inspired by personal experiences. Her debut lead single "Play" reflected her mixed emotions at the time of leaving her previous company. "Dalala" was inspired by the casual way she hummed on a liberating night stroll.

As GFriend's main vocalist, Yuju received attention for her powerful singing. For her solo activities, she worked on developing other aspects of her singing ability, focusing on delivering lyrics in a relatable way, rather than vocal range.

== Discography ==
=== Extended plays ===
List of extended plays, showing selected details, selected chart positions, and sales figures
Title	Details	Peak chart positions	Sales
Title	Details	KOR	Sales
Rec.	Released: January 18, 2022; Label: Konnect Entertainment; Formats: CD, digital download, streaming	15	KOR: 27,727
O	Released: March 7, 2023; Label: Konnect Entertainment; Formats: CD, digital download, streaming	15	KOR: 13,267
In Bloom	Released: August 12, 2025; Label: At Area; Formats: CD, digital download, streaming; Track listing: 1. "Orion" (오리온자리); 2. "Reply"; 3. "Sequence" (그날의 사건) (featuring Jeong Se-woon); 4. "Moonstruck Love"; 5. "No Matter" (featuring Gemini); 6. "Sunset" (구름에 걸린 노을처럼)	24	KOR: 13,742
File. 07	Released: October 14, 2026; Label: At Area; Formats: CD, digital download, streaming; Track listing: 1. "What Comes After" (그 뒤가 얼마나 무서울지 모른 채); 2. "Nameless" (미제); 3. "Love Gamer" (featuring Junny); 4. "SOS"; 5. "Rock Bottom"; 6. "P.S." (추신)	40	KOR: 5,052

=== Singles ===
==== As lead artist ====
List of singles as lead artist, showing year released, selected chart positions, sales figures, and name of the album
Title	Year	Peak chart positions	Album
Title	Year	KOR	Album
"Love Rain" (feat. Suran)	2018	— (Note: "Love Rain" did not enter Gaon Digital Chart, but peaked at position 55 on component Download Chart.)	Non-album single
"Play" (놀이)	2022	— (Note: "Play" did not enter Gaon Digital Chart, but peaked at position 19 on component Download Chart.)	Rec.
"Evening" (이브닝) (feat. Big Naughty)	2022	— (Note: "Evening" did not enter Circle Digital Chart, but peaked at position 72 on component Download Chart.)	Non-album single
"Without U"	2023	— (Note: "Without U" did not enter Circle Digital Chart, but peaked at position 37 and 123 on component Download and BGM Chart, respectively.)	O
"Dalala" (따라랏)	2023	— (Note: "Dalala" did not enter Circle Digital Chart, but peaked at position 50 on component Download Chart.)	Non-album single
"Reply"	2025	— (Note: "Reply" did not enter Circle Digital Chart, but peaked at position 37 and 76 on component Download and BGM Chart, respectively.)	In Bloom
"First Love Is a Curse" (첫사랑은 저주다)	2026	— (Note: "First Love Is a Curse" did not enter Circle Digital Chart, but peaked at position 77 on component Download Chart.)	Non-album single
"Nameless" (미제)	2026	— (Note: "Nameless" did not enter Circle Digital Chart, but peaked at position 94 on component Download Chart.)	File. 07
"—" denotes releases that did not chart.

==== Collaborations ====
List of collaboration singles, showing year released, selected chart positions, sales figures, and name of the album
Title	Year	Peak chart positions	Sales	Album
Title	Year	KOR	Sales	Album
"Cherish" (보일 듯 말 듯) (with Sunyoul)	2016	31	KOR: 224,943	Non-album single
"Heart Signal" (하트시그널) (with Jihoo)	2017	— (Note: "Heart Signal" did not enter Gaon Digital Chart, but peaked at position 63 on component BGM Chart.)	N/A	Non-album single
"The Last Exam" (벼락치기) (with Yoon Jong-shin)	2018	—	N/A	Monthly Project 2018 Yoon Jong-Shin
"Happiness Index" (행복지수) (with Lee Woo)	2023	— (Note: "Happiness Index" did not enter Circle Digital Chart, but peaked at position 74 and 20 on component Download and BGM Chart, respectively.)	N/A	Non-album single
"No Way" (with Pateko feat. I'MIN)	2023	— (Note: "No Way" did not enter Circle Digital Chart, but peaked at position 101 on component Download Chart.)	N/A	Non-album single
"This Isn't the End" (끝이 아니길) (with Kwon Soonkwan)	2025	—	N/A	Scenes of a MOMENT
"—" denotes releases that did not chart.

==== As featured artist ====
List of singles as featured artist, showing year released, selected chart positions, sales figures, and name of the album
Title	Year	Peak chart positions	Sales	Album
Title	Year	KOR	Sales	Album
"First Love" (첫사랑) (Jung Key featuring Yuju)	2017	38	KOR: 63,398	Cherish
"So Silly" (눈치 없긴) (San E featuring Yuju)	2021	180	N/A	Non-album single
"Destiny" (Babylon featuring Yuju)	2023	—	N/A	Colors
"It's Not That I Don't Love You" (너를 사랑하지 않는 맘이 아냐) (Kid Wine featuring Yuju)	2024	—	N/A	Sommelier
"Sweaty" (kaogali, Geegooin, and Kohway featuring Yuju)	2024	—	N/A	RAP:PUBLIC Episode.2
"—" denotes releases that did not chart.

==== Promotional singles ====
List of promotional singles, showing year released, selected chart positions, sales figures, and name of the album
Title	Year	Peak chart positions	Album
Title	Year	KOR	Album
"By Your Side" (너의 곁으로)	2021	— (Note: "By Your Side" did not enter Circle Digital Chart, but peaked at position 68 on component Download Chart.)	Cyworld BGM 2021
"Rewind"	2023	— (Note: "Rewind" did not enter Circle Digital Chart, but peaked at position 95 on component Download Chart.)	Non-album single
"—" denotes releases that did not chart.

==== Soundtrack appearances ====
List of soundtrack appearances, showing year released, selected chart positions, sales figures, and name of the album
Title	Year	Peak chart positions	Sales (DL)	Album
Title	Year	KOR	Sales (DL)	Album
"Spring Is Gone by Chance" (우연히 봄) (with Loco)	2015	5	KOR: 2,500,000	A Girl Who Sees Smells OST Part 2
"Spring Is Gone by Chance" (우연히 봄) (Acoustic Ver.) (with Loco)	2015	—	KOR: 14,981	A Girl Who Sees Smells OST Part 2
"Just This Song" (이 노래만)	2018	—	N/A	Let's Eat 3 OST Part 3
"Snowflake Love" (눈꽃사랑)	2018	— (Note: "Snowflake Love" didn't enter Gaon Digital Chart, but peaked at position 58 on component BGM Chart.)	N/A	My Strange Hero OST Part 5
"This Way That Way" (이랬다 저랬다)	2020	— (Note: "This Way That Way" did not enter Circle Digital Chart, but peaked at position 124 on component BGM Chart.)	N/A	Yoobyeolna! Chef Moon OST Part 1
"First Day"	2020	— (Note: "First Day" didn't enter Gaon Digital Chart, but peaked at position 42 on component BGM Chart.)	N/A	Was It Love? OST Part 3
"Secret" (feat. ISHXRK)	2020	— (Note: "Secret" didn't enter Gaon Digital Chart, but peaked at position 81 on component BGM Chart.)	N/A	Alice OST Part 1
"I'm in the Mood for Dancing"	2020	— (Note: "I'm In the Mood for Dancing" didn't enter Gaon Digital Chart, but peaked at position 39 on component BGM Chart.)	N/A	True Beauty OST Part 2
"Falling"	2021	— (Note: "Falling" didn't enter Gaon Digital Chart, but peaked at position 43 on component Download Chart.)	N/A	Run On OST Part 10
"Comfort" (위로)	2021	—	N/A	Bossam: Steal the Fate OST Part 11
"Comfort" (위로) (String Ver.)	2021	— (Note: "Comfort" didn't enter Gaon Digital Chart, but peaked at position 90 on component BGM Chart.)	N/A	Bossam: Steal the Fate OST Part 11
"Stay (Prod. by Jinyoung)" (남아있어 (Prod. by 진영))	2021	— (Note: "Stay" didn't enter Circle Digital Chart, but peaked at position 56 on component Download Chart.)	N/A	Police University OST Part 5
"My Americano" (아메리카노 같아 넌)	2022	— (Note: "My Americano" didn't enter Gaon Digital Chart, but peaked at position 146 on component Download Chart.)	N/A	Kiss Sixth Sense OST Part 1
"Tell Me This Is Real"	2022	— (Note: "Tell Me This Is Real" didn't enter Gaon Digital Chart, but peaked at position 64 on component Download Chart.)	N/A	My Chilling Roommate OST Part 1
"Paradise"	2022	—	N/A	Closers OST: Paradise
"Real Love"	2022	— (Note: "Real Love" didn't enter Circle Digital Chart, but peaked at position 96 on component Download Chart.)	N/A	Love in Contract OST Part 1
"My Whole World Is You" (온 세상이 나에게)	2023	— (Note: "My Whole World Is You" didn't enter Circle Digital Chart, but peaked at position 122 on component Download Chart.)	N/A	The Story of Park's Marriage Contract OST Part 3
"Rest In You" (단잠)	2025	—	N/A	This is a Campus Romance Series OST
"—" denotes releases that did not chart.

==== Compilation appearances ====
List of compilation appearances, showing year released, selected chart positions, sales figures, and name of the album
Title	Year	Peak chart positions	Album
Title	Year	KOR	Album
"I Love You" (난 널 사랑해)	2015	—	King of Mask Singer Vol. 16
"Without a Heart" (심장이 없어) (with The Name)	2015	—	King of Mask Singer Vol. 17
"Play" (놀이)	2023	—	Begin Again Open Mic Episode 39
"—" denotes releases that did not chart.

=== Composition credits ===
All song credits are adapted from the Korea Music Copyright Association's database unless stated otherwise.

List of songs, showing year released, artist name, name of the album, and credited roles
Title	Year	Artist	Album	Composer	Lyricist	Ref.
"Hope" (기대)	2019	GFriend	Fever Season	No	Yes	N/A
"Apple"	2020	GFriend	回:Song of the Sirens	Yes	Yes	N/A
"Eye of the Storm"	2020	GFriend	回:Song of the Sirens	Yes	Yes	N/A
"Tarot Cards"	2020	GFriend	回:Song of the Sirens	Yes	Yes	N/A
"Mago"	2020	GFriend	回:Walpurgis Night	Yes	Yes	N/A
"Night Drive"	2020	GFriend	回:Walpurgis Night	Yes	Yes	N/A
"Bad Blood" (Intro)	2022	Yuju	Rec.	No	Yes	N/A
"Play" (놀이)	2022	Yuju	Rec.	Yes	Yes	N/A
"Cold Winter" (겨우, 겨울)	2022	Yuju (feat. Mad Clown)	Rec.	Yes	Yes	N/A
"The Killa" (데킬라)	2022	Yuju	Rec.	Yes	Yes	N/A
"Blue Nostalgia"	2022	Yuju	Rec.	Yes	Yes	N/A
"Look at Me" (Korean Ver.)	2022	Yurina Kawaguchi	Cherish	No	Yes	
"Evening" (이브닝)	2022	Yuju (feat. Big Naughty)	Non-album single	No	Yes	N/A
"9 Years"	2023	Yuju	O	Yes	Yes	N/A
"Without U"	2023	Yuju	O	No	Yes	N/A
"Dreaming" (꿈)	2023	Yuju	O	No	Yes	N/A
"Peach Blossom" (복숭아꽃)	2023	Yuju (feat. Sokodomo)	O	Yes	Yes	N/A
"Full Circle"	2023	Yuju	O	Yes	Yes	N/A
"Destiny"	2023	Babylon (feat. Yuju)	Colors	Yes	Yes	
"Dalala" (따라랏)	2023	Yuju	Non-album single	Yes	Yes	
"No Way"	2023	Yuju (with Pateko feat. I'MIN)	Non-album single	Yes	Yes	N/A
"It's Not That I Don't Love You" (너를 사랑하지 않는 맘이 아냐)	2024	Kid Wine (feat. Yuju)	Sommelier	No	Yes	
"Always"	2025	GFriend	Season of Memories	Yes	Yes	
"Orion" (오리온자리)	2025	Yuju	In Bloom	Yes	Yes	N/A
"Reply"	2025	Yuju	In Bloom	No	Yes	N/A
"Sequence" (그날의사건)	2025	Yuju (feat. Jeong Se-woon)	In Bloom	Yes	Yes	N/A
"Moonstruck Love"	2025	Yuju	In Bloom	No	Yes	N/A
"No Matter"	2025	Yuju (feat. GEMINI)	In Bloom	Yes	Yes	N/A
"Sunset" (구름에걸린노을처럼)	2025	Yuju	In Bloom	No	Yes	N/A
"First Love Is a Curse" (첫사랑은 저주다)	2026	Yuju	Non-album single	Yes	Yes	N/A
"What comes after" (그 뒤가 얼마나 무서울지 모른 채)	2026	Yuju	file. 07	Yes	Yes	N/A
"Nameless" (미제)	2026	Yuju	file. 07	Yes	Yes	N/A
"Love Gamer"	2026	Yuju (feat. JUNNY)	file. 07	Yes	Yes	N/A
"SOS"	2026	Yuju	file. 07	Yes	Yes	N/A
"Rock Bottom"	2026	Yuju	file. 07	Yes	Yes	N/A
"P.S." (추신)	2026	Yuju	file. 07	Yes	Yes	N/A

== Videography ==
=== Music videos ===
Title	Year	Other performer(s) credited	Director(s)	Ref.
"Cherish" (보일 듯 말 듯)	2016	Sunyeol	TOP Media	
"Heart Signal" (하트시그널)	2017	Jihoo	Sunny Visual	
"First Love" (첫사랑)	2017	Jung Key	Lee Young-cheon (BBang Film)	
"The Last Exam" (벼락치기)	2018	Yoon Jong-shin	Kim Jin-joo	
"Play" (놀이)	2022	None	Yua Suh (Flipevil)	
"Evening" (이브닝)	2022	Big Naughty	Jan' Qui (KeepUsWeird)	
"Without U"	2023	None	Kang Su-jeong (546Focus)	
"Happiness Index" (행복지수)	2023	Lee Woo	Chun Hee-seung; Park Joo-hee	
"Dalala" (따라랏)	2023	None	Novv Kim (NOVV)	
"Reply"	2025	None	Lee Kiwook (Inside Film)	
"First Love Is a Curse" (첫사랑은 저주다)	2026	None	Unknown	
"Nameless" (미제)	2026	None	Unknown	

=== Other videos ===
Title	Year	Director(s)	Ref.
Love Rain (Feat. SURAN(수란)) (Lyric Video)	2018	Unknown	
이브닝(Feat. BIG Naughty)_MV_Storyboard.mov	2022	Jan' Qui (KEEPUSWEIRD)	
복숭아꽃 ART FILM	2023	Kang Su-jeong (546Focus)	

== Filmography ==
=== Film ===
Year	Title	Role	Notes	Ref.
2023	Ma'am Chief: Shakedown in Seoul	Herself	Philippine film cameo	

=== Television shows ===
Year	Title	Role	Notes	Ref.
2015	King of Mask Singer	Contestant	Episodes 15-16	
2017	Fantastic Duo 2	Contestant	Episodes 27-28	
2017	Immortal Songs 2	Contestant	Episode 326	
2024	Scool	Mentor		
2025	B:MY BOYZ	Vocal Master		

=== Web shows ===
Year	Title	Role	Notes	Ref.
2021	Yuju is Halli Queen	Herself	5 episodes	

=== Radio shows ===
Year	Title	Role	Notes	Ref.
2022	Yuju's Night View	DJ	August 9 – December 27	

=== Hosting ===
Year	Title	Role	Notes	Ref.
2021	KBS Korean Children's Song Contest	MC	with Na Tae-ju & Nam Hyun-jong	
2024	Youth Generation Harmony Festival	MC	with Yoo Hwe-seung	

== Awards and nominations ==
Name of the award ceremony, year presented, category, nominee of the award, and the result of the nomination
Award ceremony	Year	Category	Nominee / Work	Result	Ref.
Melon Music Awards	2015	Best OST Award	"Spring Is Gone by Chance" (with Loco)	Won	
K Global Heart Dream Awards	2022	K Global Vocal Award	Yuju	Won	
Hanteo Music Awards	2023	Top Trending Artist Award	Yuju	Won	
Seoul Music Awards	2024	New Wave Star	Yuju	Won	
