= Lightsum =

South Korean girl group

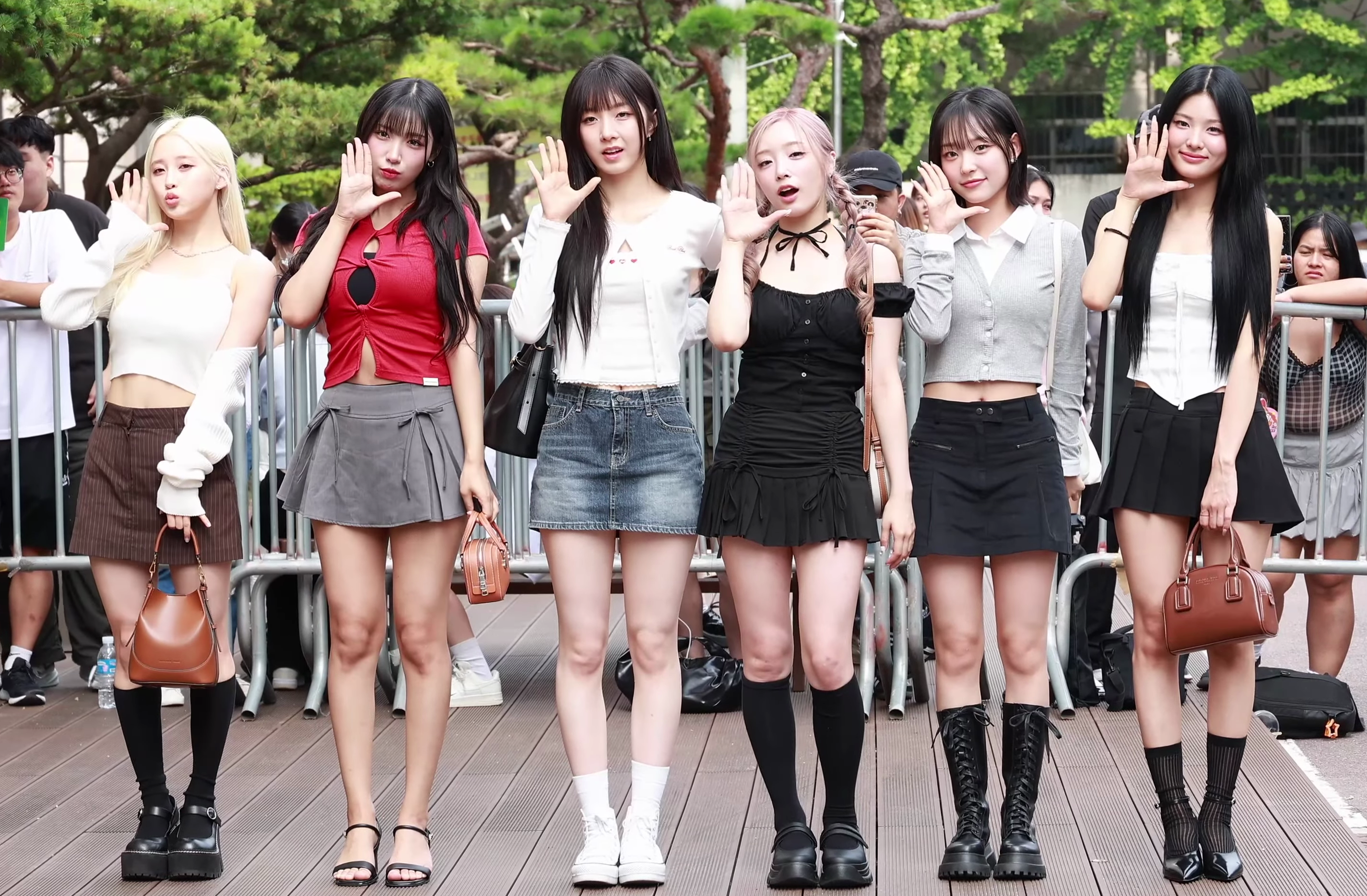
- Lightsum in August 2024; L–R: Nayoung, Chowon, Juhyeon, Hina, Yujeong, and Sangah

Background information
- Origin: Seoul, South Korea
- Genres: K-pop; J-pop
- Years active: 2021–present
- Label: Cube
- Member of: United Cube
- Members: Sangah; Chowon; Nayoung; Hina; Juhyeon; Yujeong
- Past members: Huiyeon; Jian
- Website: Official website

Lightsum (Korean: 라잇썸, stylized in all caps) is a South Korean girl group formed by Cube Entertainment. The group is composed of six members: Sangah, Chowon, Nayoung, Hina, Juhyeon, and Yujeong. Originally an eight-member group, Lightsum debuted on June 10, 2021, with the single album Vanilla. Members Huiyeon and Jian departed the group in October 2022. The group made its Japanese debut on September 23, 2026, with the extended play Re:Idol.

== Name ==
The group's name, Lightsum, is a combination of the words "light" and "sum", which symbolizes "things that shine small gather together to light up the world, delivering greater positive energy through a message of hope".

== History ==
=== 2017–2020: Pre-debut activities ===
Juhyeon participated in The Unit: Idol Rebooting Project in 2017–2018 where she finished in 25th place. Chowon, Nayoung, and Yujeong participated in Produce 48 in 2018 where they finished in 13th place, 21st place, and 51st place respectively. However, in 2019, it was later revealed that Chowon's real ranking was 6th place, which would have put her in the lineup of Iz*One. Juhyeon later participated in Dancing High in 2018, but did not pass the evaluation round. Chowon was cast in Bully Bad Guys and The Dominator 3: Junior Bullies in 2020.

=== 2021–2025: Debut with Vanilla, Into the Light, lineup changes, and Honey or Spice ===
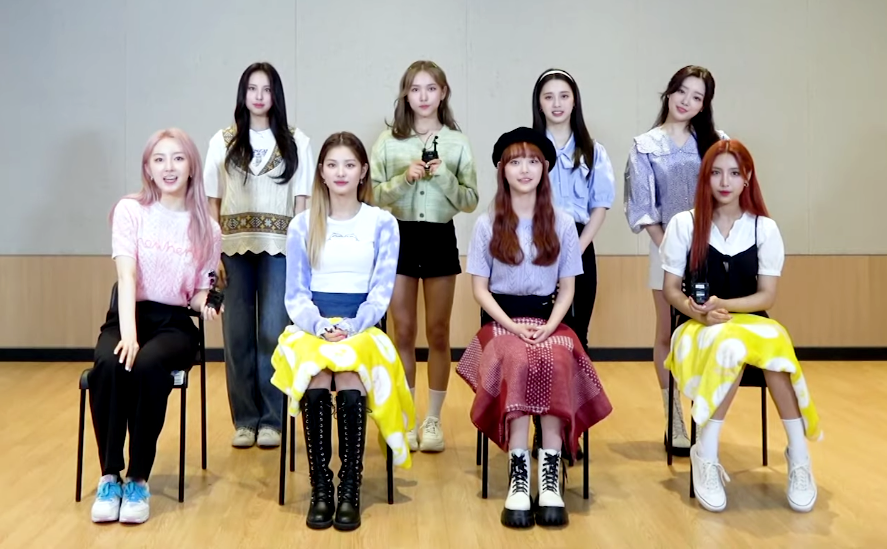
Lightsum in June 2021

On April 15, 2021, Cube Entertainment announced that it would be debuting a new girl group, their first since (G)I-dle in 2018. The members were revealed in pairs from April 19 to 22 (in order: Juhyeon, Sangah, Chowon, Jian, Nayoung, Huiyeon, Hina, and Yujeong). A video trailer with all eight members was revealed on April 23, 2021. On May 27, it was announced that Lightsum would release their debut single album Vanilla on June 10, making their broadcast debut on Mnet's M Countdown with a performance of their debut single. On October 13, Lightsum released their second single album Light a Wish, with "Vivace" serving as the lead single.

On May 24, 2022, Lightsum released their first extended play Into the Light, with the lead single "Alive". On October 25, Cube Entertainment announced the departure of members Huiyeon and Jian from the group and that Lightsum would be reorganized as a group of six.

On May 5, 2023, it was reported that Lightsum is currently under preparations for a comeback in the first half of 2023. On June 7, Sangah participated in Mnet's girl group survival show Queendom Puzzle as a contestant. she was eliminated in the first elimination rounds. On September 18, it was announced that they would have their comeback in the second week of October with their second extended play. On September 21, it was announced that Lightsum would release their second EP Honey or Spice on October 11. On October 11, the group made their comeback after 1 year and 5 months with the release of their second EP "Honey or Spice", along with its lead single as the same name.

=== 2024–present: Digital singles and debut in Japan with Re:Idol ===
On August 7, 2024, Lightsum released the digital single "Pose!".

On March 11, 2025, it was announced that Lightsum would participate in A-Idol, an AI-based idol survival show produced by MBC featuring both human contestants and artificial intelligence. On March 29, Cube Entertainment confirmed that Lightsum would hold their first solo fan concert in Japan titled 2025 Light Fan-con [Blooming Picnic], at the Hulic Hall Tokyo on May 2, with two performances scheduled. On December 31, Cube Entertainment announced that Sangah, Chowon, and Juhyeon would debut as Lightsum's first sub-unit with a digital single scheduled for release in early 2026.

On January 15, 2026, a sub-unit release titled "Beautiful Pain" with members Sangah, Chowon, and Juhyeon was released. This is a remake version of BtoB's version released in 2018. On August 9, the Abema documentary series Re:Idol, documenting Lightsum's preparations for their activities in Japan, premiered; the group released their first Japanese-language EP of the same name on September 23, which includes the lead single "Doshite", pre-released on September 16. The Korean version of "Doshite" was released on October 21. The Christmas single "Merry Kiss" was released on November 6.

== Members ==
=== Current ===
- Sangah (상아)
- Chowon (초원)
- Nayoung (나영)
- Hina (히나)
- Juhyeon (주현)
- Yujeong (유정)

=== Former ===
- Huiyeon (휘연)
- Jian (지안)

== Discography ==
=== Extended plays ===
List of extended plays, showing selected details, selected chart positions, and sales figures
Title	Details	Peak chart positions		Sales
Title	Details	KOR	JPN	Sales
Into the Light	Released: May 24, 2022; Label: Cube Entertainment; Formats: CD, digital download, streaming	13	—	KOR: 17,902
Honey or Spice	Released: October 11, 2023; Label: Cube Entertainment; Formats: CD, digital download, streaming	14	—	KOR: 19,412
Re:Idol	Released: September 23, 2026; Label: Cube Entertainment, Warner Music Japan; Formats: CD, digital download, streaming	—	20	JPN: 1,532
"—" denotes a recording that did not chart or was not released in that territory

=== Single albums ===
List of single albums, showing selected details, selected chart positions, and sales figures
Title	Details	Peak chart positions	Sales
Title	Details	KOR	Sales
Vanilla	Released: June 10, 2021; Label: Cube Entertainment; Formats: CD, digital download, streaming	12	KOR: 41,143
Light a Wish	Released: October 13, 2021; Label: Cube Entertainment; Formats: CD, digital download, streaming	7	KOR: 28,416

=== Korean singles ===
List of Korean singles, showing year released, selected peak positions, and name of the album
Title	Year	Peak chart positions		Album
Title	Year	KOR Down.	US World	Album
"Vanilla"	2021	59	8	Vanilla
"Vivace"	2021	16	8	Light a Wish
"Alive"	2022	54	—	Into the Light
"Honey or Spice"	2023	96	—	Honey or Spice
"Pose!"	2024	63	—	Non-album single
"—" denotes a recording that did not chart or was not released in that territory

=== Japanese singles ===
List of Japanese singles, showing year released, selected peak positions, and name of the album
Title	Year	Peak chart positions	Album
Title	Year	JPN Heat.	Album
"Why" (どうして)	2026	19	Re:Idol

== Videography ==
=== Music videos ===
Title	Year	Director(s)	Length	Ref.
"Vanilla"	2021	Vikings League	3:32	
"Vivace"	2021	Etui	3:34	
"Alive"	2022	Jimmy (Via)	3:39	
"Honey or Spice"	2023	Novv Kim (Novv)	3:38	
"Pose!"	2024	Unknown	2:37	
"Doshite" (Japanese Version)	2026	Mitsunori Yokobori	4:10	
"Doshite/어떡해" (Korean Version)	2026	Unknown	3:24	
"夜を歩く君へ"	2026	Unknown	3:53	

== Awards and nominations ==
Name of the award ceremony, year presented, category, nominee of the award, and the result of the nomination
Award ceremony	Year	Category	Nominee / Work	Result	Ref.
Asia Artist Awards	2021	Female Idol Group Popularity Award	Lightsum	Nominated	
Asia Artist Awards	2022	Potential Awards – Music	Lightsum	Won	
Asian Pop Music Awards	2021	Best New Artist (Overseas)	Light a Wish	Nominated	
Genie Music Awards	2022	Next Wave Icon	Lightsum	Won	
Hanteo Music Awards	2021	Rookie Award – Female Group	Lightsum	Nominated	
Hanteo Music Awards	2024	Hanteo Choice K-Pop Female Artist	Lightsum	Won	
Korea First Brand Awards	2022	Female Rookie Idol Award	Lightsum	Won	
Mnet Asian Music Awards	2021	Artist of the Year	Lightsum	Longlisted	
Mnet Asian Music Awards	2021	Best New Female Artist	Lightsum	Nominated	
Seoul Music Awards	2022	K-wave Popularity Award	Lightsum	Nominated	
Seoul Music Awards	2022	Popularity Award	Lightsum	Nominated	
Seoul Music Awards	2022	Rookie of the Year	Lightsum	Nominated	
