= Vanilla (Lightsum song) =

- Digital cover

Single by Lightsum
- Language: Korean
- Released: June 10, 2021
- Length: 3:24
- Label: Cube; Kakao
- Composers: Steven Lee; Caroline Gustavsson; J. Littlewood
- Lyricist: Jo Yoon-kyung

Lightsum singles chronology
"Vanilla" (2021)	"Vivace" (2021)

Music video
- "Vanilla" on YouTube

"Vanilla" is a debut single recorded by South Korean girl group Lightsum. It was released by Cube Entertainment on June 10, 2021.

== Background and release ==
On April 15, 2021, Cube Entertainment announced that it would be debuting a new girl group, the first since (G)I-dle in 2018. On May 27, it was announced they would be releasing their debut single "Vanilla" on June 10. Four days later, the promotional schedule was released. On June 4, the audio snippet was released. The music video teaser was released on June 8 and 9.

== Composition ==
"Vanilla" was written by Jo Yoon-kyung, composed and arranged by Steven Lee, and J. Littlewood alongside Caroline Gustavsson for the composition. It was described as teen pop and dance-pop song with lyrics about "expressing the thrill of tension when starting something new with the sweetness of the moment you fall in love". "Vanilla" was composed in the key of A major with a tempo of 120 beats per minute.

== Commercial performance ==
"Vanilla" debuted at number 12 on South Korea's Gaon Album Chart in the chart issue dated June 6–12, 2021; on the monthly chart, the song debuted at number 28 in the chart issue for June 2021 with 27,897 copies sold. On the Gaon Download Chart, the song debuted at number 59 in the chart issue dated June 6–12, 2021. In United States, the song debuted at number eight on the Billboard World Digital Song Sales in the chart issue dated June 26, 2021.

== Promotion ==
Prior to the release of "Vanilla", Lightsum held an online showcase on the same day to introduce the song and to communicate with their fans. The group subsequently performed on three music programs in the first week: KBS's Music Bank on June 11, MBC's Show! Music Core on June 12, and SBS's Inkigayo on June 13.

== Credits and personnel ==
Credits adapted from Melon.

Studio

- Cube Studio – recording
- Klang Studio – mixing
- 821 Sound Mastering – mastering

Personnel

- Lightsum – vocals
- Lightsum (Juhyeon) – background vocals
- Jo Yoon-kyung – lyrics
- Steven Lee – composition, arrangement
- Caroline Gustavsson – composition, background vocals
- J. Littlewood – composition, arrangement
- Choi Ye-ji – recording
- Koo Jong-pil – mixing
- Jung Yu-ra – mixing (assistant)
- Kwon Nam-woo – mastering
- Jang Seung-ho – mastering (assistant)

== Charts ==
=== Weekly charts ===
Weekly chart performance for "Vanilla"
Chart (2022)	Peak position
South Korea (Gaon Download)	59
South Korean Albums (Gaon)	12
US World Digital Song Sales (Billboard)	8

=== Monthly charts ===
Monthly chart performance for "Vanilla"
Chart (2022)	Peak position
South Korean Albums (Gaon)	28

== Sales ==
Overall sales for "Vanilla"
Region	Sales
South Korea	41,143

== Release history ==
Release history for "Vanilla"
Region	Date	Format	Label
South Korea	June 10, 2021	CD	Cube; Kakao
Various	June 10, 2021	Digital download; streaming	Cube; Kakao
