= Jayananda Lama =

Nepalese folk singer (1956–2022)

Jayananda Lama जयानन्द लामा
- Born: 1956; Bahrabise, Sindhupalchowk District, Nepal
- Died: 23 February 2022 (aged 65); Kaushaltar, Bhaktapur, Nepal
- Genres: Nepali Folk Music
- Occupation(s): Singer, actor, Writer, Film Producer and director an Music Researcher
- Years active: 50 years

Jayananda Lama (Nepali: जयानन्द लामा; 1956 – 23 February 2022) was a Nepalese folk singer and actor.

== Biography ==
Lama was born in Bahrabise, Nepal, and won a consolation prize in a national competition when he was 13. He earned his Bachelor's diploma in classical music from Lalit Kala Campus in India and his master's degree in classical music from Allahabad University, India. He worked at the Royal Nepal Academy and in Radio Nepal as the Head of Folk Department.

He made his acting debut in the movie Man Ko Bandh (1973). Since then, he had acted in more than a hundred movies.

Lama was found dead in front of his house in Kaushaltar, Bhaktapur, on 23 February 2022, at the age of 65.

== Songs ==
- Kalakate Kainyo
- Ke ko sacho dalli resham
- Mula Ko Chana
- Salala Pani
- Chuin Chuin Chuinkane Joota
- Herdama Ramro
- Unbho ta Sailung
- Mahabhar lekh ko jungle
