= Trendz (group) =

South Korean boy band

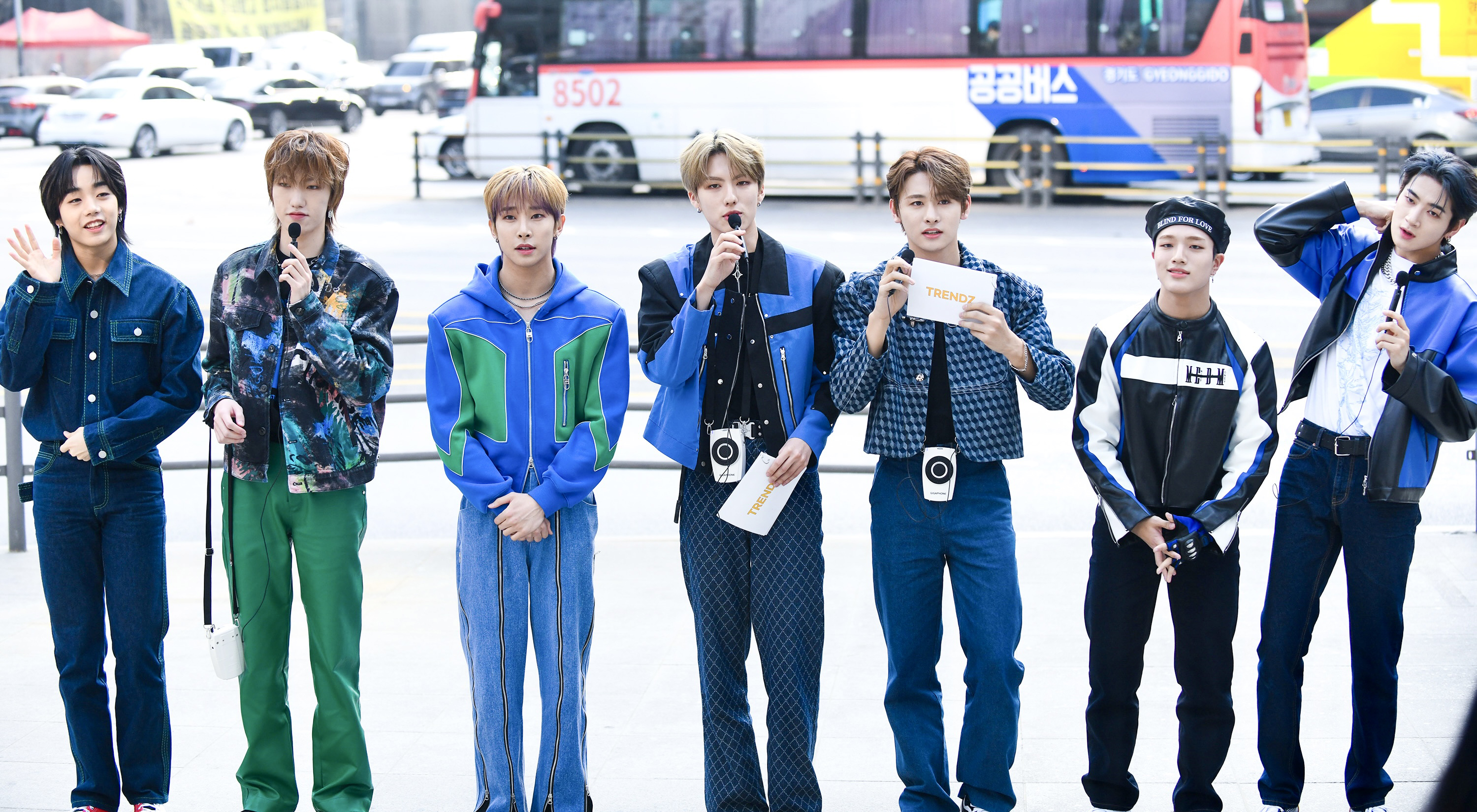
- Trendz busking in Gangnam, April 2023; From left: Havit, ra.L, Leon, Hankook, Eunil, Yechan, Yoonwoo

Background information
- Origin: Seoul, South Korea
- Genres: K-pop
- Years active: 2022–present
- Labels: Interpark Music Plus; Global H; Avex Trax
- Members: Havit; Leon; Yoonwoo; Hankook; ra.L; Eunil; Yechan

Trendz (Korean: 트렌드지; RR: Teurendeuji; stylized in all caps) is a South Korean boy band formed by Interpark Music Plus. The group consists of seven members: Havit, Leon, Yoonwoo, Hankook, ra.L, Eunil, and Yechan. The group made their official debut on January 5, 2022, with their first EP titled Blue Set Chapter 1. Tracks.

== History ==
=== Pre-debut ===
In late 2017, Havit, Leon, and Hankook competed on the survival reality show Mix Nine, placing 39th, 56th, and 67th respectively out of all male contestants.

On July 21, 2021, Interpark announced that they had established a subsidiary label, Interpark Music Plus, for their idol group production business. It was also revealed that the label is preparing to launch a new male idol group within the year.

=== 2022–present: Debut with Blue Set Chapter 1. Tracks, Blue Set Chapter 2. Choice ===
On January 5, 2022, Trendz released their debut EP, Blue Set Chapter 1. Tracks.

On June 8, Trendz released their second EP, Blue Set Chapter 2. Choice.

On November 12, Trendz released their 1st single album, Blue Set Chapter. Unknown Code.

On March 15, 2023, Trendz released their 2nd single album, Blue Set Chapter. New Dayz.

== Members ==
- Havit (하빛)
- Leon (리온)
- Yoonwoo (윤우)
- Hankook (한국)
- ra.L (라엘)
- Eunil (은일)
- Yechan (예찬)

== Discography ==
=== Extended plays ===
List of extended plays, showing selected details, selected chart positions, and sales figures
Title	Details	Peak chart positions		Sales
Title	Details	KOR	JPN	Sales
Blue Set Chapter 1. Tracks	Released: January 5, 2022; Label: Interpark Music Plus; Formats: CD, digital download, streaming; Track listing: 1. "Villain"; 2. "TNT (Truth & Trust)"; 3. "Trauma"; 4. "□ (Be My Love)"; 5. "TNT (Truth & Trust)" (instrumental)	30	—	KOR: 7,927
Blue Set Chapter 2. Choice	Released: June 8, 2022; Label: Interpark Music Plus; Formats: CD, digital download, streaming; Track listing: 1. "Awake"; 2. "Who [吼]"; 3. "Clique"; 4. "Re: Daybreak"; 5. "Forever More"	25	—	KOR: 25,947
Rebirth	Released: July 31, 2024; Label: Avex Trax; Formats: CD, digital download, streaming; Track listing: 1. "Rebirth"; 2. "Burn Up"; 3. "Season of You"; 4. "My Way" (Japanese version); 5. "Never Ending"	—	45	JPN: 1,104
Canvas	Released: April 9, 2025; Label: Avex Trax; Formats: CD, digital download, streaming; Track listing: 1. "Push Down"; 2. "Daybreak"; 3. "Bad Enough"; 4. "Best Friend"; 5. "Matrix"	—	42	JPN: 858

=== Single albums ===
List of single albums, showing selected details, selected chart positions, and sales figures
Title	Details	Peak chart positions	Sales
Title	Details	KOR	Sales
Blue Set Chapter. Unknown Code	Released: November 12, 2022; Label: Global H; Formats: CD, digital download, streaming; Track listing: 1. "One Way to Go" (Intro); 2. "Vagabond"; 3. "Breakdown"	12	KOR: 25,122
Blue Set Chapter. New Dayz	Released: March 15, 2023; Label: Global H; Formats: CD, digital download, streaming; Track listing: 1. "New Days"; 2. "Fantasy"; 3. "Nightmare"	7	KOR: 31,389
Still on My Way	Released: September 6, 2023; Label: Global H; Formats: CD, digital download, streaming; Track listing: 1. "Ven Conmigo"; 2. "My Way"; 3. "O.Y.E"	6	KOR: 69,763
Dreamlike	Released: June 12, 2024; Label: Global H; Formats: CD, digital download, streaming; Track listing: 1. "Glow"; 2. "Out of Control"; 3. "Learn to Love" (English Version); 4. "Go Up" (English Version)	3	KOR: 72,947
Chameleon	Released: May 1, 2025; Label: Global H; Formats: CD, digital download, streaming; Track listing: 1. "RPZ"; 2. "Chameleon"; 3. "ddoO ddoO"	5	KOR: 42,444
On My Knees	Released: July 8, 2026; Label: Global H; Formats: CD, digital download, streaming	9	KOR: 46,891

==== As lead artist ====
Title	Year	Peak chart positions	Album
Title	Year	KOR Down.	Album
Korean
"TNT" (Truth & Trust)	2022	—	Blue Set Chapter 1. Tracks
"Who" (吼)	2022	—	Blue Set Chapter 2. Choice
"Vagabond"	2022	—	Blue Set Chapter. Unknown Code
"New Dayz"	2023	—	Blue Set Chapter. New Dayz
"My Way"	2023	—	Still On My Way
"Go Up"	2024	198	Non-album single
"Glow"	2024	196	Dreamlike
"Chameleon"	2025	—	Chameleon
"Crime"	2025	—	Non-album single
"Oh My Knees"	2026	—	Oh My Knees
Japanese
"Rebirth"	2024	—	Rebirth
"Season Of You"	2024	—	Rebirth
"Bad Enough"	2025	—	Non-album singles
"まだあと0cm"	2026	—	Non-album singles
"Which Way Is Love?"	2026	—	Non-album singles

== Ambassadorship ==
- Global Environmental Ambassador (2023)

== Awards and nominations ==
Name of the award ceremony, year presented, category, nominee of the award, and the result of the nomination
Award ceremony	Year	Category	Nominee / Work	Result	Ref.
Asia Artist Awards	2022	Focus Award	Trendz	Won	
