= 面: Unknown Atlas =

Studio album by Onewe
- Released: August 19, 2026
- Recorded: 2026
- Studios: RBW, Giuk
- Genre: Rock
- Length: 1:00:26
- Language: Korean
- Labels: RBW; Kakao

Onewe chronology
點: The Quiver (2026)	面: Unknown Atlas (2026)

Singles from 面: Unknown Atlas
- 1. "Icarus" Released: May 28, 2026; 2. "Neverland" Released: July 27, 2026; 3. "Scenario" Released: August 19, 2026

Music videos
- "Icarus" on YouTube
- "Neverland" on YouTube
- "Scenario" on YouTube

面: Unknown Atlas is the third studio album by the South Korean band Onewe. It was released by RBW and distributed by Kakao Entertainment on August 19, 2026. It consists of a total of 17 tracks, including the pre-release singles "Icarus" and "Neverland" and the album's lead single "Scenario".

== Background and release ==
On May 15, 2026, Onewe released a schedule plan announcing their new album series connecting points (點), lines (線) and planes (面) – a fairytale voyage where familiar stories are reinterpreted through Onewe's unique lens. Beginning with the release of four tracks on the band's second single album 點: The Quiver including "Icarus" on May 28, the series continues with "Neverland" released on the digital single 線: The Wake on July 27, culminating with the release of the band's third full-length album 面 : Unknown Atlas on August 19, 2026.

== Track listing ==
面: Unknown Atlas track listing
No.	Title	Lyrics	Music	Arrangement	Length
1.	"Scenario"	X3RO, Harin, Giuk	X3RO, Harin	X3RO, Harin, Kanghyun, Bae Hyung-ho	3:43
2.	"Coordinates" (좌표)	Kanghyun, Giuk, Bydor Archive	Kanghyun, Bydor Archive, Gu Ye-eun	Bydor Archive, Kanghyun	3:40
3.	"Compass" (나침반)	Giuk, Bydor Archive	Giuk, Bydor Archive, wez	Bydor Archive	3:50
4.	"Icarus"	Kanghyun, Giuk, Bydor Archive	Kanghyun, Bydor Archive, wez	Bydor Archive, Kanghyun	3:50
5.	"Fly"	Dongmyeong, Giuk, Bydor Archive	Dongmyeong, Giuk, Bydor Archive, wez	Bydor Archive, Dongmyeong	3:42
6.	"Neverland" (우리들은 행방불명)	Giuk, Bydor Archive	Giuk, Bydor Archive, Kanghyun, wez	Bydor Archive	3:23
7.	"Tinker Bell" (피크요정)	Giuk, Bydor Archive, Kanghyun	Giuk, Gray Dot, Bydor Archive	Gray Dot	3:28
8.	"Fairy Tale" (동화)	Kanghyun, Giuk	Kanghyun, Bydor Archive	Bydor Archive, Kanghyun	3:23
9.	"Lilliput" (소인국)	Kanghyun, Giuk, Bydor Archive	Kanghyun, Bydor Archive	Bydor Archive, Kanghyun	2:51
10.	"Laputa"	Kanghyun, Giuk, Bydor Archive	Kanghyun, Bydor Archive, Gu Ye-eun	Bydor Archive, Kanghyun	2:48
11.	"Pinocchio" (피투성이 피노키오)	Giuk, Bydor Archive	Giuk, Bydor Archive, wez, Choi Min-ho	Bydor Archive	3:11
12.	"Imposter"	Harin, Giuk	X3RO, Harin	X3RO, Harin, Kanghyun	3:21
13.	"Stand up"	Jeon Da-woon (RBW), Yonghoon	Jeon Da-woon (RBW), Yonghoon	Jeon Da-woon (RBW), Kanghyun	4:13
14.	"Beautiful Runaway" (아름다운 날이야)	Yonghoon, Jeon Da-woon (RBW)	Jeon Da-woon (RBW), Yonghoon	Jeon Da-woon (RBW)	3:28
15.	"Just You" (바로 너야)	Yonghoon, Jeon Da-woon (RBW)	Yonghoon, Jeon Da-woon (RBW)	Jeon Da-woon (RBW), Yonghoon	3:50
16.	"Beyond the Night" (흘러간 시간에 그대로 멈춰 있지 않기를)	Harin, X3RO	Heon, X3RO	Heon, X3RO, Now1K, Kang Isaac, Harin	4:09
17.	"The End." (다음에 계속)	Dongmyeong, Bydor Archive	Dongmyeong, Bydor Archive, Kim Jae-ho	Bydor Archive, Dongmyeong	3:36
Total length:					01:00:26

== Charts ==
Chart performance for 面: Unknown Atlas
Chart (2026)	Peak position
South Korean Albums (Circle)	7
