= List of songs recorded by Mamamoo =

Mamamoo (Korean: 마마무), sometimes stylized as MAMAMOO, is a South Korean girl group formed by Rainbow Bridge World (formerly WA Entertainment) in 2014. The group officially debuted on June 18, 2014 with the song "Mr. Ambiguous". Their debut was considered by some critics as one of the best K-pop debuts of 2014. They are recognized for their retro, jazz, and R&B concepts and strong vocal performances.

== Released songs ==
Key
†	Indicates single release
‡	Indicates song included on an alternative version of the album
*	Indicates soundtrack single release

Title	Artist(s)	Writer(s)	Album	Year	Ref
"1,2,3 Eoi!" (하나둘셋 어이!)	Mamamoo	Kim Do-hoon; Mingkey; Inner Child; Moon Byul; Solar	Mic On	2022	
"A Little Bit" (따끔)	Mamamoo	Hwang Seong-jin; Kim Chang-rak; Lee Eun-ji; Lee Seung-yeop	Pink Funky	2015	
"Ahh Oop!" (아훕!) †	Mamamoo & eSNa	Esther Yoon	Pink Funky	2015	
"Angel" †	Solar & Wheein	Park Woo-sang	Memory	2016	
"Aze Gag" (아재개그)	Mamamoo	Kim Yong-sun; Ahn Hye-jin; Moon Byul-yi; Kim Do-hoon	Purple	2017	
"Aya"	Mamamoo	Kim Do-hoon; Lee Sang-ho; Moon Byul-yi	Travel	2020	
"Baton Touch"	Mamamoo	Park Woo-sang	Hello	2014	
"Better"	Mamamoo+ feat. Big Naughty	Oneway; Ravn; Big Naughty	Non-album single	2022	-
"Cat Fight" (고양이)	Mamamoo	Hwang Yoo-bin; Lee Hoo-sang; Moon Byul-yi; S2REN	Melting	2016	
"Chuck"	Mamamoo	Kim Do-hoon; TENTEN; Moon Byul-yi	Travel	2020	
"Da Ra Da" (다라다)	Wheein, Jeff Bernat & B.O.	B.O. 파이어뱃	Purple	2017	
"Dab Dab" †	Hwasa & Moonbyul	Park Woo-sang; Kim Ma-cho	Memory	2016	
"Décalcomanie" (데칼코마니) †	Mamamoo	Kim Yong-sun; Ahn Hye-jin; Moon Byul-yi; Kim Do-hoon	Memory	2016	
"Destiny" (우린 결국 다시 만날 운명이었지)	Mamamoo	Kim Do-hoon; Park Woo-sang	Reality in Black	2019	
"Diamond"	Mamamoo	Kim Eana; Park Woo-sang	Travel	2020	
"Dingga"	Mamamoo	Kim Do-hoon; Park Woo-sang; Moon Byul-yi	Travel	2020	
"Don't Be Happy" (행복하지마) †	Mamamoo & Bumkey	Esther Yoon	Hello	2014	
"Double Trouble Couple" *	Mamamoo	—N/a	Strong Girl Bong-soon OST	2017	
"Egotistic" (너나해)	Mamamoo	Kim Do-hoon; Park Woo-sang	Red Moon	2018	
"Emotion"	Mamamoo	Moon Byul-yi; Cosmic Sound; Cosmos	Melting	2016	
"Finally"	Mamamoo	Moon Byul-yi; Cosmic Sound; Cosmic Girl	Purple	2017	
"Friday Night" (금요일밤)	Mamamoo & Junggigo	Moon Byul-yi; Park Woo-sang	Melting	2016	
"Freakin Shoes"	Mamamoo	Ahn Hye-jin; Kim Do-hoon; Seo Jae-woo	Pink Funky	2015	
"Funky Boy"	Mamamoo	Yoon Hye-joo; Daniel Palm; Ellen Berg Tollbom	Melting	2016	
"Gentleman"	Mamamoo & eSNa	Kim Eana; Kim Do-hoon; Esther Yoon	Piano Man	2014	
"Girl Crush" *	Mamamoo	Jang Yoon-seo; Park Woo-sang	Melting	2016	
"Girl Crush" *	Mamamoo	Jang Yoon-seo; Park Woo-sang	Innisia Nest OST	2015	
"Good Night"	Mamamoo	Jeon Dawoon; Coco Tofu Dad; Moon Byul-yi	Travel	2020	
"Heeheehaheho" (히히하헤호) †	Mamamoo & Geeks	Esther Yoon; Kim Do-hoon; Oh Seung-taek; Louie; Ahn Hye-jin	Hello	2014	
"Hello"	Mamamoo	Esther Yoon; Kim Do-hoon	Hello	2014	
"Hip"	Mamamoo	Kim Do-hoon; Park Woo-sang; Ahn Hye-jin	Reality in Black	2019	
"I Do Me" (내맘이야)	Hwasa	Ahn Hye-jin	Hello	2014	
"I Love Too" (놓지 않을게)	Mamamoo	Kim Yong-sun; Ahn Hye-jin; Moon Byul-yi; Kim Do-hoon	Memory	2016	
"I Miss You" †	Mamamoo	Cosmic Sound; Hwang Yoo-bin; Moon Byul-yi	Melting	2016	
"Illella" †	Mamamoo	Kim Do-hoon; Kang Ji-won; Cosmic Girl; Moon Byul; Inner Child	Mic On	2022	
"Just"	Mamamoo	Park Woo-sang	Melting	2016	
"Just Believe In Love"	Mamamoo		Travel ‡	2020	
"L.I.E.C"	Mamamoo	Kim Do-hoon; Kang Ji-won; Seo Yong-bae	Mic On	2022	
"Love" *	Mamamoo	—N/a	Goblin OST	2017	
"Love & Hate" (구차해)	Moonbyul	Moon Byul-yi; Park Woo-sang	Purple	2017	
"Love Lane" *	Mamamoo	Kim Eana; Kim Do-hoon; Esther Yoon	Piano Man ‡	2014	
"Love Lane" *	Mamamoo	Kim Eana; Kim Do-hoon; Esther Yoon	Marriage, Not Dating OST	2014	
"Memory" (그리고 그리고 그려봐)	Mamamoo	Kim Yong-sun; Moon Byul-yi; Kim Do-hoon	Memory	2016	
"Midnight Summer Dream (여름밤의 꿈)"	Mamamoo	Cosmic Sound; Cosmic Girl; Moon Byul-yi	Red Moon	2018	
"Moderato"	Mamamoo & Hash Swan	Jung Whee-in; Park Woo-sang; Hash Swan	Memory	2016	
"Morning"	Mamamoo	Park Woo-sang; Moon Byul-yi	Blue;s	2018	
"Mr. Ambiguous" (Mr.애매모호) †	Mamamoo	Min Yeon-jae; Louie; Kim Do-hoon	Hello	2014	
"My Everything" *	Mamamoo	—N/a	SPY OST	2015	
"My Hometown" (고향이)	Mamamoo	Kim Do-hoon; Kim Yong-sun; Ahn Hye-jin; Moon Byul-yi; Jung Whee-in	Melting	2016	
"New York" †	Mamamoo	Moon Byul-yi; Park Woo-sang	Memory	2016	
"No No No" (갑과 을)	Mamamoo	Moon Byul-yi; Seo Yong-bae; Park Woo-sang	Pink Funky	2015	
"Open Your Mind"	Mamamoo	—N/a	Man to Man OST	2017	
"Peppermint Chocolate" (썸남썸녀) †	Mamamoo & K.Will featuring Wheesung	Kim Eana; Choi Whee-sung; Kim Do-hoon; Esther Yoon	Hello ‡	2014	
"Piano Man" †	Mamamoo	Kim Eana; Kim Do-hoon; Esther Yoon	Piano Man	2014	
"Recipe" (나만의 Recipe)	Mamamoo	Kim Do-hoon; Kim Yong-sun; Ahn Hye-jin; Moon Byul-yi; Park Woo-sang	Melting	2016	
"Self Camera"	Mamamoo	Kim Se-moon; Park Woo-sang	Pink Funky	2015	
"Stand Up" *	Mamamoo & Basick	—N/a	Show Me the Money 4 Episode 5	2015	
"Taller Than You" (1cm의 자존심) †	Mamamoo	Kim Do-hoon; Kim Yong-sun; Ahn Hye-jin; Moon Byul-yi	Melting	2016	
"Ten Nights" (열 밤)	Mamamoo	Won Yeon-jeong; Kim Hyun-A; Hwang Seong-jin; Coco Tofu Dad; Jang Jin-yeong	Reality in Black	2019	
"This Song" *	Mamamoo & Loco	—N/a	My Lovely Girl OST	2014	
"Travel"	Mamamoo	Kim Do-hoon; Park Woo-sang; Moon Byul-yi	Travel	2020	
"Um Oh Ah Yeh" (음오아예) †	Mamamoo	Kim Yong-sun; Ahn Hye-jin; Moon Byul-yi; Kim Do-hoon	Pink Funky	2015	
"Universe"	Mamamoo	Cosmic Sound; Cosmic Girl; Moon Byul-yi	Reality in Black	2019	
"Wanna Be Myself"	Mamamoo	Cosmic Sound; Cosmic Girl	Travel ‡	2020	
"Wind Flower"	Mamamoo	Kim Do-hoon; Park Woo-sang; Moon Byul-yi	Blue;s	2018	
"Woo Hoo" (기대해도 좋은 날) *	Mamamoo	Cosmic Sound; Cosmic Girl; Jang Yoon-seo; Park Woo-sang	Memory ‡	2016	
"Woo Hoo" (기대해도 좋은 날) *	Mamamoo	Cosmic Sound; Cosmic Girl; Jang Yoon-seo; Park Woo-sang	LG G5 And Friends OST	2016	
"Words Don't Come Easy" (우리끼리)	Mamamoo	Kim Do-hoon; Park Woo-sang; Esther Yoon	Melting	2016	
"Yes I Am" (나로 말할 것 같으면) †	Mamamoo	Kim Yong-sun; Ahn Hye-jin; Moon Byul-yi; Kim Do-hoon	Purple	2017	
"You're the Best" (넌 is 뭔들) †	Mamamoo	Kim Do-hoon; Kim Yong-sun; Moon Byul-yi; Park Jang-geun; Kim Jung-seung	Melting	2016	

== See also ==
- List of songs written by Moonbyul
