= List of songs written by Moonbyul =

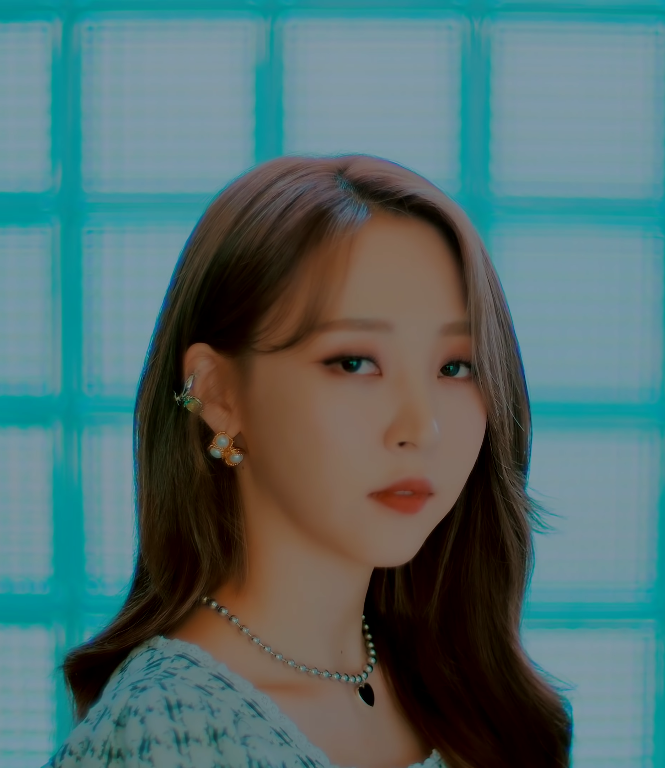
Moonbyul featured in Bumkey "The Lady"'s music video in 2021.

Moon Byul-yi (Korean: 문별이), more commonly known by the mononym Moonbyul, is a South Korean rapper and songwriter signed under RBW. She debuted as a member of the South Korean girl group Mamamoo on 19 June 2014, and later formed a duo with Solar as Mamamoo+ in August 2022. Moonbyul co-writes a majority of Mamamoo's output alongside the other members. As of February 2025, the Korea Music Copyright Association has 125 songs listed under her name, unless stated otherwise.

== 2014 ==
Artist	Song	Album	Lyrics		Music	
Artist	Song	Album	Credited	With	Credited	With
Mamamoo	**"Piano Man"**	Piano Man	Yes	Kim Eana	No	
Mamamoo (feat. Esna)	"Gentleman"	Piano Man	Yes	Kim Eana	No	
**Bold** denotes title track.

== 2015 ==
Artist	Song	Album	Lyrics		Music	
Artist	Song	Album	Credited	With	Credited	With
Mamamoo	**"Um Oh Ah Yeh"** (음오아예)	Pink Funky	Yes	Kim Do-hoon, Solar, Hwasa	No	
Mamamoo	"No No No" (갑과 을)	Pink Funky	Yes	Seo Yong-bae, Park Woo-sang	No	
Mamamoo	"Um Oh Ah Yeh" (Acapella version)	Pink Funky	Yes	Kim Do-hoon, Solar, Hwasa	No	
Bumzu (feat. 8Dro)	"Secret Love"	Good Life	Yes	Paldro (8DRO) Beomju Gye	No	
U Sung-eun (feat. Moonbyul)	"Nothing"	2nd Mini Album	Yes	Seo Yong-bae, Suho, Iggy	No	
**Bold** denotes title track.

== 2016 ==
Artist	Song	Album	Lyrics		Music	
Artist	Song	Album	Credited	With	Credited	With
Mamamoo	**"Taller Than You"** (1cm의 자존심)	Melting	Yes	Kim Do-hoon, Solar, Hwasa	No	
Mamamoo	**"You're the Best"** (넌 is 뭔들)	Melting	Yes	Kim Do-hoon, Solar	No	
Mamamoo	"My Hometown" (고향이)	Melting	Yes	Kim Do-hoon, Solar, Wheein, Hwasa	No	
Mamamoo	"Emotion"	Melting	Yes	Cosmic Sound, Cosmic	No	
Mamamoo	**"I Miss You"**	Melting	Yes	Cosmic Sound, Hwang Yoo-bin	No	
Mamamoo	"Recipe" (나만의)	Melting	Yes	Solar, Hwasa, Park Woo-sang	No	
Mamamoo	"Cat Fight" (고양이)	Melting	Yes	Hwang, Lee Hoo-sang	No	
Mamamoo (feat. Junggigo)	"Friday Night" (금요일밤)	Melting	Yes	Park Woo-sang	No	
Mamamoo	"Memory" (그리고 그리고 그려봐; Draw & Draw & Draw)	Memory	Yes	Solar, Kim Do-hoon	No	
Mamamoo	**"Décalcomanie"** (데칼코마니)	Memory	Yes	Solar, Kim Do-hoon	No	
Mamamoo	**"New York"**	Memory	Yes	Park Woo-sang	No	
Mamamoo	"I Love Too" (놓지 않을게)	Memory	Yes	Solar, Hwasa	No	
**Bold** denotes title track.

== 2017 ==
Artist	Song	Album	Lyrics		Music	
Artist	Song	Album	Credited	With	Credited	With
Mamamoo	**"Yes I Am"** (나로 말할 것 같으면)	Purple	Yes	Kim Do-hoon, Solar, Hwasa	No	
Mamamoo	"Finally"	Purple	Yes	Cosmic Sound, Cosmic Girl	No	
Mamamoo	"Love & Hate" (Note: Song was released under Mamamoo, but is a solo track performed by Moonbyul) (구차해)	Purple	Yes	Park Woo-sang	No	
Mamamoo	"Aze Gag" (아재개그)	Purple	Yes	Kim Do-hoon, Solar, Hwasa	No	
Mamamoo	"Open Your Mind" (마음아 열려라)	Man to Man OST	Yes	Hwasa, Solar, Kim Do-hoon	No	
Girls Next Door (prod. by Jinyoung)	**"Deep Blue Eyes"**	Idol Drama Operation Team OST	Yes	Jinyoung, D.ANA	No	
**Bold** denotes title track.

== 2018 ==
Artist	Song	Album	Lyrics		Music	
Artist	Song	Album	Credited	With	Credited	With
Mamamoo	"Star Wind Flower Sun" (별 바람 꽃 태양)	Yellow Flower	Yes	Solar	No	
Mamamoo	"Rude Boy"	Yellow Flower	Yes	Cosmic Sound, Cosmic Girl	No	
Mamamoo	**"Starry Night"** (별이 빛나는 밤)	Yellow Flower	Yes	Kim Do-hoon, Park Woo-sang	No	
Mamamoo	"Spring Fever" (봄타)	Yellow Flower	Yes	Jowul	No	
Moonbyul	"Love & Hate" (구차해) (Acoustic Ver.)	Selfish	Yes	Park Woo-sang	No	
Moonbyul	"In My Room"	Selfish	Yes	Park Woo-sang	No	
Mamamoo	"Everyday" (Note: "Everyday" was released as a promotional single in collaboration with brand "BIO".) (매일 봐요)	Non-album single	Yes	Cosmic Sound, Cosmic Girl	No	
Mamamoo	"Midnight Summer Dream" (여름밤의 꿈)	Red Moon	Yes	Cosmic Sound, Cosmic Girl	No	
Mamamoo	"Sky! Sky!" (하늘하늘) (청순)	Red Moon	Yes	Yongbae, Iggy	No	
Mamamoo	"Sleep in the Car" (잠이라도 자지)	Red Moon	Yes	Hwasa, Solar, Kim Do-hoon	No	
Mamamoo	"No More Drama"	Blue;s	Yes	Kim Do-hoon, Solar	Yes	Kim Do-hoon, Solar
Mamamoo	**"Wind Flower"**	Blue;s	Yes	Kim Do-hoon, Park Woo-sang	No	
Mamamoo	"Better Than I Thought" (생각보단 괜찮아)	Blue;s	Yes	Lee Hoo-sang	No	
Mamamoo	"Morning"	Blue;s	Yes	Park Woo-sang	No	
**Bold** denotes title track.

== 2019 ==
Artist	Song	Album	Lyrics		Music	
Artist	Song	Album	Credited	With	Credited	With
Mamamoo	"Where R You"	White Wind	Yes	Cosmic Sound, Cosmic Girl	No	
Mamamoo	**"Gogobebe"** (고고베베)	White Wind	Yes	Kim Do-hoon, Solar	No	
Mamamoo	"Waggy" (쟤가 걔야)	White Wind	Yes	Kim Do-hoon	No	
Mamamoo	"Bad Bye"	White Wind	Yes	B.O.	No	
Mamamoo	"My Star"	White Wind	Yes	Cosmic Sound, Cosmic Girl	No	
HA:TFELT (feat. Moonbyul)	"Happy Now"	Non-album singles	Yes	HA:TFELT	No	
Mamamoo	**"Gleam"** (Note: "Gleam" was released as a promotional single in collaboration with brand "Davich".) (다 빛이나)	Non-album singles	Yes	Cosmic Sound, Cosmic Girl	No	
Mamamoo	"Sleep Talk"	4colors	Yes	Lauren Kaori	No	
Mamamoo	"Wow"	Search: WWW OST	Yes	Kim Min	No	
Mamamoo	"I Miss You"	Queendom Fan-dora's Box Part 1	Yes	Hwang Yu-bin, Kim Do-Hoon	No	
Mamamoo	"Universe"	Reality in Black	Yes	Cosmic Sound, Cosmic Girl	No	
Mamamoo	"4x4ever"	Reality in Black	Yes	Lee Sang-ho, IGGY, Yongbae	No	
Mamamoo	"Better"	Reality in Black	Yes	Cosmic Sound, Cosmic Girl	No	
Mamamoo	"Hello Mama"	Reality in Black	Yes	Yongbae, Lee Woo-sang	No	
Mamamoo	"ZzZz" (심심해)	Reality in Black	Yes	Lee Woo-sang, Ryu Jisoo	No	
Mamamoo	"High Tension" (춤을 춰)	Reality in Black	Yes	Jarry Potter	No	
**Bold** denotes title track.

== 2020 ==
Artist	Song	Album	Lyrics		Music	
Artist	Song	Album	Credited	With	Credited	With
Moonbyul	"Eclipse" (달이 태양을 가릴 때)	Dark Side of the Moon	Yes	Seo Young-bae, Lee Hu-sang, Minky, Inner Child (MonoTree), Kim Do-hoon	No	
Moonbyul	"Mirror"	Dark Side of the Moon	Yes	Minky	Yes	Minky
Moonbyul	"Moon Movie"	Dark Side of the Moon	Yes	Park Woo-sang	No	
Moonbyul	"Snow" (눈)	Dark Side of the Moon	Yes	Park Woo-sang	No	
Moonbyul	"Absence" (부재)	門OON	Yes	Park Woo-sang	No	
SSAK3 (feat. Mamamoo)	"Excited" (신난다)	SSAK3 Special Album	Yes	Cosmic Sound, Cosmic Girl, Lee Hyun-seung, Jung Ji-hoon	No	
JeA (feat. Moonbyul)	"Greedyy"	Non-album single	Yes	IU	No	
Mamamoo	"Travel"	Travel	Yes	Kim Do-hoon, Park Woo-sang	No	
Mamamoo	**"Dingga"** (딩가딩가)	Travel	Yes	Kim Do-hoon, Park Woo-sang	No	
Mamamoo	**"Aya"**	Travel	Yes	Kim Do-hoon, Lee Sang-ho	Yes	Kim Do-hoon, Lee Sang-ho
Mamamoo	"Chuck" (척)	Travel	Yes	Kim Do-hoon, TENTEN	No	
Mamamoo	"Good Night" (잘자)	Travel	Yes	Jeon Dawoon, Coco Tofu Dad	No	
Moonbyul	**"A Miracle 3 Days Ago"**	Non-album single	Yes	Coco Tofu Dad	Yes	Coco Tofu Dad
**Bold** denotes title track.

== 2021 ==
Artist	Song	Album	Lyrics		Music	
Artist	Song	Album	Credited	With	Credited	With
Mamamoo	"Just Believe In Love"	Travel (Japan Edition)	Yes	Yuki Kokubo, Lauren Kaori	No	
Mamamoo	"A Memory For Life" (애써)	WAW	Yes	Jeon Da-woon (RBW), Cocodooboopapa	No	
Xydo (feat. Moonbyul)	"Me Without You" (너 없는 난)	Non-album single	Yes	Coco Tofu Dad, Daddy, Xydo	Yes	Coco Tofu Dad, Xydo, Park Hyun
Mamamoo	**"Mumumumuch"** (하늘 땅 바다만큼)	I Say Mamamoo: The Best	Yes	Kim Do-hoon, Cosmic Sound, Cosmic Girl	No	
Mamamoo	"Happier than Ever" (분명 우린 그때 좋았었어)	I Say Mamamoo: The Best	Yes	Kim Do-hoon, Cosmic Sound, Cosmic Girl	Yes	Kim Do-hoon, Cosmic Sound, Cosmic Girl
Mamamoo	"Paint Me (Orchestral Version)" (칠해줘)	I Say Mamamoo: The Best	Yes	Dr. Jo	No	
Mamamoo	"Starry Night (Orchestra ver.)" (별이 빛나는 밤)	I Say Mamamoo: The Best	Yes	Kim Do-hoon, Park Woo-sang	No	
Mamamoo	"Gogobebe (Rock ver.)" (고고베베)	I Say Mamamoo: The Best	Yes	Kim Do-hoon, Solar	No	
Mamamoo	"You’re the best 2021" (넌 is 뭔들 2021)	I Say Mamamoo: The Best	Yes	Kim Do-hoon, Park Woo-sang	No	
Mamamoo	"I Miss You 2021"	I Say Mamamoo: The Best	Yes	Cosmic Sound, Hwang Yoo-bin	No	
Mamamoo	"HeeHeeHaHeHo Part.2" (히히하헤호 Part.2)	I Say Mamamoo: The Best	Yes	Kim Do-Hoon, Esna, Hwasa	No	
Mamamoo	"Piano Man 2021"	I Say Mamamoo: The Best	Yes	Kim Eana	No	
Mamamoo	"Ahh Oop 2021"	I Say Mamamoo: The Best	Yes	Esna	No	
Mamamoo	"Decalcomanie 2021" (데칼코마니)	I Say Mamamoo: The Best	Yes	Kim Do-hoon, Solar, Hwasa	No	
Mamamoo	"Aya (Traditional ver.)"	I Say Mamamoo: The Best	Yes	Kim Do-hoon, Lee Sang-ho	Yes	Kim Do-hoon, Lee Sang-ho
Mamamoo	"A little bit 2021" (따끔 2021)	I Say Mamamoo: The Best	Yes	Hwang Sung-jin, Kim Chang-reol, Lee Eun-ji	No	
Mamamoo	"Wind flower (Dramatic ver.)"	I Say Mamamoo: The Best	Yes	Kim Do-Hoon, Park Woo-sang	No	
Mamamoo	"Um Oh Ah Yeh 2021" (음오아예 2021)	I Say Mamamoo: The Best	Yes	Kim Do-hoon, Solar, Hwasa	No	
Mamamoo	"Don't Be Happy 2021"	I Say Mamamoo: The Best	Yes	Esna	No	
Mamamoo	"Yes I am (Funk boost ver.)" (나로 말할 것 같으면)	I Say Mamamoo: The Best	Yes	Kim Do-hoon, Solar, Hwasa	No	
Mamamoo	"Strange Day"	WAW (Japan Edition)	Yes	Yhel, Starbuck	No	
Moonbyul	"Chemistry"	Non-album single	Yes	Coco Tofu Dad	Yes	Coco Tofu Dad
Moonbyul (feat. Mirani)	**"G999"**	6equence	Yes	Seo Young-bae, Park Hyeon-gyu, Mirani	No	
Moonbyul (feat. Seori)	**"Shutdown"** (머리에서 발끝까지)	6equence	Yes	Coco Tofu Dad, Jeon Daun, Lim Sang-hyeok	No	
**Bold** denotes title track.

== 2022 ==
Artist	Song	Album	Lyrics		Music	
Artist	Song	Album	Credited	With	Credited	With
Moonbyul	"For Me" (너만 들었으면 좋겠다)	6equence	Yes	Coco Tofu Dad	No	
Moonbyul	"What Can I Do?" (Ddu Ddu Ddu) (내가 뭘 어쩌겠니?)	6equence	Yes	Coco Tofu Dad	Yes	Coco Tofu Dad
Mamamoo	"Decalcomanie" (Japanese ver.)	I Say Mamamoo: The Best (Japan Edition)	Yes	Hwasa, Solar, Kim Do-hoon	No	
Mamamoo	"Wind flower" (Japanese ver.)	I Say Mamamoo: The Best (Japan Edition)	Yes	Kim Do-hoon, Park Woo-sang	No	
Mamamoo	"Starry Night" (Japanese ver.)	I Say Mamamoo: The Best (Japan Edition)	Yes	Kim Do-hoon, Park Woo-sang	No	
Mamamoo	"Gogobebe" (Japanese ver.)	I Say Mamamoo: The Best (Japan Edition)	Yes	Solar, Kim Do-hoon	No	
Mamamoo	"Aya" (Japanese ver.)	I Say Mamamoo: The Best (Japan Edition)	Yes	Kim Do-hoon, Lee Sang-ho	Yes	Kim Do-hoon, Lee Sang-ho
Mamamoo	"Dingga" (Japanese ver.)	I Say Mamamoo: The Best (Japan Edition)	Yes	Kim Do-hoon, Park Woo-sang	No	
Mamamoo	"Mumumumuch" (Japanese ver.)	I Say Mamamoo: The Best (Japan Edition)	Yes	Cosmic Sound, Cosmic Girl, Kim Do-hoon	No	
Mamamoo	"Shampoo" (Japanese ver.)	I Say Mamamoo: The Best (Japan Edition)	Yes	Coco Tofu Dad, Im Sang-hyuk	No	
Mamamoo	"Smile"	I Say Mamamoo: The Best (Japan Edition)	Yes	Seo Young-bae, Park Hyeon-gyu, Coco Tofu Dad, Lee Sang-ho	No	
Moonbyul	**"C.I.T.T (Cheese in the Trap)"**	C.I.T.T (Cheese in the Trap)	Yes	Seo Young-bae, Park Hyeon-gyu, Coco Tofu Dad, Lee Sang-ho	No	
Moonbyul	"My Moon" (반달)	C.I.T.T (Cheese in the Trap)	Yes	Coco Tofu Dad	No	
Mamamoo	"1,2,3 Eoi!" (하나둘셋 어이!)	Mic On	Yes	Kim Do-hoon, Kim Min-gi, Inner Child (MonoTree), Solar	Yes	Kim Do-hoon, Kim Min-gi, Inner Child (MonoTree)
Mamamoo	**"Illella"** (일낼라)	Mic On	Yes	Kim Do-hoon, Kang Ji-won, Cosmic Girl, Inner Child (MonoTree)	Yes	Kim Do-hoon, Kang Ji-won, Inner Child (MonoTree)
AleXa (feat. Moonbyul)	"Star"	Girls Gone Vogue	Yes	Jung Yun-kyung, Kwang Jeong-jin, Playing Children	No	
Moonbyul	"Present"	The Present	Yes	Coco Tofu Dad	Yes	Coco Tofu Dad
**Bold** denotes title track.

== 2023 ==
Artist	Song	Album	Lyrics		Music	
Artist	Song	Album	Credited	With	Credited	With
Mamamoo+	"LLL"	ACT 1, SCENE 1	Yes	Solar, Kim Do-hoon	Yes	Solar, Kim Do-hoon
Mamamoo+	"Chico malo" (나쁜놈)	ACT 1, SCENE 1	Yes	Seo Young-bae, Solar, Kim Do-hoon	Yes	Seo Young-bae, Solar, Kim Do-hoon
Mamamoo+	"Chico malo" (Aniri ver.) (나쁜놈)	ACT 1, SCENE 1	Yes	Seo Young-bae, Solar, Kim Do-hoon	Yes	Seo Young-bae, Solar, Kim Do-hoon
David Yong (feat. Moonbyul)	"Maybe Love" (아마도 우린)	Non-album single	Yes	Roydo, AllThou, FLORA, Davve	Yes	Roydo, Konquest, +1
Mamamoo+	"**dangdang**" (댕댕)	TWO RABBITS	Yes	Hwasa, Solar, Kim Do-hoon	Yes	Hwasa, Solar, Kim Do-hoon
Mamamoo+	"Save Me" (지구에 혼자 남게 된다면)	TWO RABBITS	Yes	Giuk	Yes	Giuk, Jeon Dawoon
Moonbyul	"11:11"	Non-album single	Yes	Coco Tofu Dad	No	
**Bold** denotes title track.

== 2024 ==
Artist	Song	Album	Lyrics		Music	
Artist	Song	Album	Credited	With	Credited	With
Moonbyul	"Like a Fool"	Starlit of Muse	Yes	Coco Tofu Dad	Yes	Coco Tofu Dad
Moonbyul	"After Sunset" (그런 밤)	Starlit of Muse	Yes	Coco Tofu Dad	Yes	Coco Tofu Dad
Kim Jae-joong (feat. Moonbyul)	"The Light"	Flower Garden	Yes	Jeong Si Hyun, Kim Jae-joong	No	
Moonbyul	"Backpack" (백팩)	Starlit of Twinkle	Yes	Flawless	No	
Moonbyul	"Dear." (어떤 하루에 어떤 시간 속에)	Starlit of Twinkle	Yes	Coco Tofu Dad	No	
**Bold** denotes title track.

== 2025 ==
Artist	Song	Album	Lyrics		Music	
Artist	Song	Album	Credited	With	Credited	With
Moonbyul	"Hoshiakari" (ほしあかり)	Aurora	Yes	Kakizaki Hikaru	No	
Moonbyul	"Because of you"	Aurora	Yes	Yonghoon	Yes	Jeon Da Woon, Yonghoon
**Bold** denotes title track.

== See also ==
- List of songs recorded by Mamamoo
