= Some (song) =

Single by Soyou and Junggigo featuring Lil Boi
- B-side: "Blind (Twilight Mix)"
- Released: February 7, 2014
- Genre: K-pop, R&B
- Length: 3:31
- Label: Starship Entertainment
- Songwriters: Kim Do-hoon, Min Yeon-jae, Xepy, Esna, Lil Boi, Junggigo
- Producer: Kim Do-hoon

Music video
- "Some" on YouTube

"Some" (Korean: 썸) is a song by South Korean singers Soyou (SISTAR) and Junggigo, featuring Lil Boi of Geeks. It was released online as a digital single on February 7, 2014 through Starship Entertainment.

The song was a commercial success, peaking at number 1 on the Gaon Digital Chart, Gaon Download Chart, and Gaon Streaming Chart. The song has been streamed over 109,772,229 times and has sold over 2,212,895 downloads as of 2014.

== Release ==
"Some" was released on February 7, along with a music video. "Some" is a medium tempo song with music composed by Kim Do-hoon, Xepy, and Esna, and lyrics written by Min Yeon-jae, Xepy, Esna, Lil Boi, and Junggigo. The music video was directed by ZanyBros and starred B1A4's Baro and Soyou's bandmate Kim Dasom.

== Promotions ==
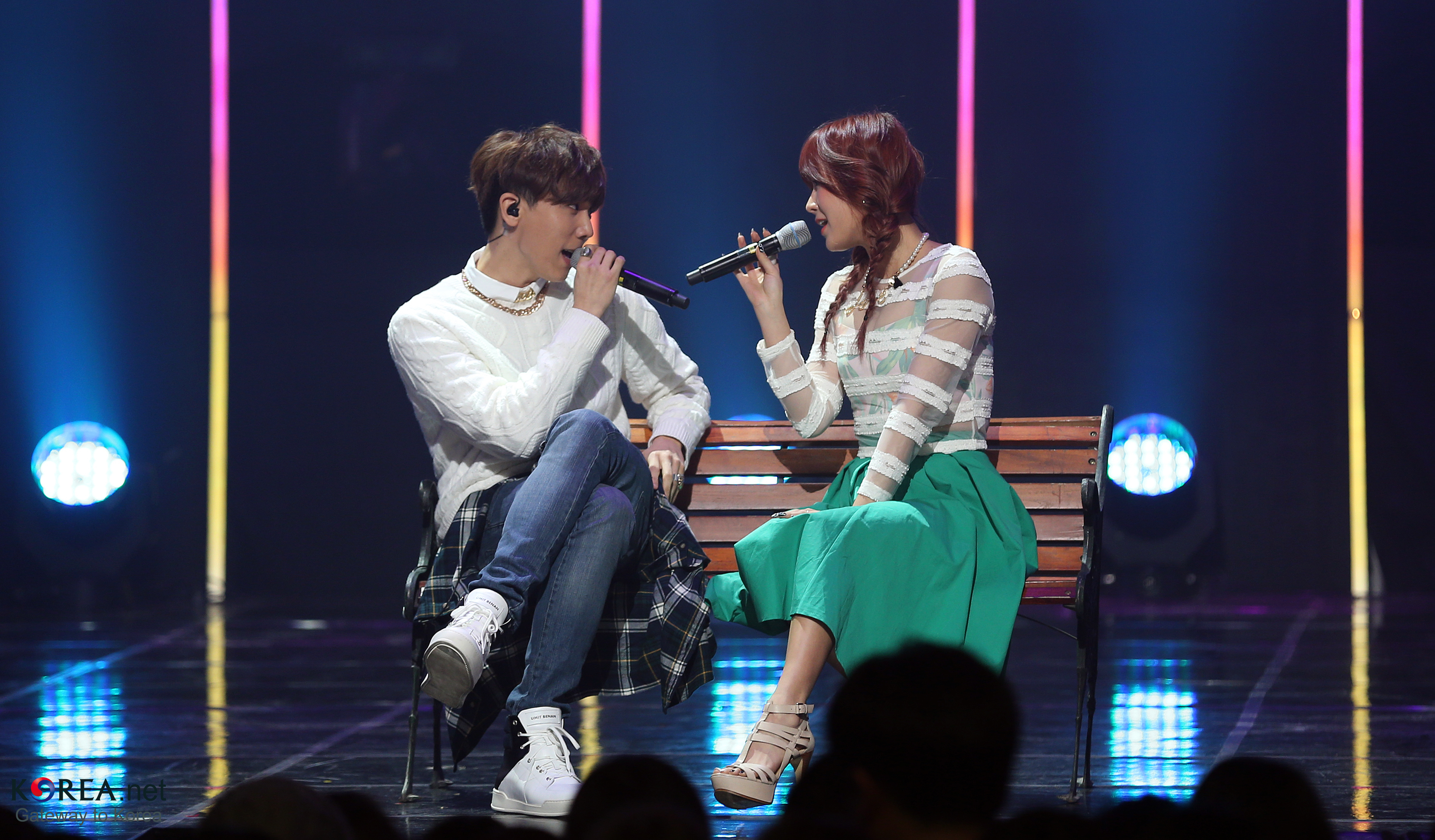
Soyou and Junggigo performing the song

Soyou and Junggigo had their debut stage on Mnet's M Countdown on February 6, 2014. The duo also performed "Some" on various music shows such as Music Bank, Music Core and Inkigayo in February and March.

The song received numerous first place awards on various music show broadcasts, with five wins on KBS Music Bank (February 21, 28, March 7, 21 and April 4), two wins on Mnet's M! Countdown (February 20, 27) and MBC's Music Core (February 22 and March 1) and a single win on SBS' Inkigayo (February 23) and MBC M's Show Champion (February 19).

== Chart performance ==
The song charted at number one for two weeks on South Korea's Gaon Digital Chart. The song was also number one for six weeks on the Billboard Korea K-Pop Hot 100. This feat makes the song the longest-running chart topper of 2014.

== Track listing ==
No.	Title	Lyrics	Music	Arrangement	Length
1.	"Some" (Soyou and Junggigo featuring Lil Boi)	Min Yeon-jae, Xepy, Esna, Lil Boi, Junggigo	Kim Do-hoon, Xepy, Esna	Kim Do-hoon, Seo Yong-bae	03:31
2.	"Blind (Twilight Mix)" (Junggigo solo)	Junggigo	Junggigo, Lee Kang-woo	Lee Kang-woo	03:38
Total length:					07:09

== Charts ==
Chart (2014)	Peak position
Gaon Digital Chart (weekly)	1
Gaon Digital Chart (monthly)	1
Gaon Digital Chart (year-end)	1
