= Hello (Mamamoo EP) =

- Digital and Red version cover

EP by Mamamoo
- Released: June 18, 2014
- Genres: K-pop; R&B
- Length: 21:13
- Language: Korean
- Label: WA
- Producer: Kim Do-hoon

Mamamoo chronology
Hello (2014)	Piano Man (2014)

Singles from Hello
- 1. "Don't Be Happy" Released: January 9, 2014; 2. "Peppermint Chocolate" Released: February 11, 2014; 3. "Heeheehaheho" Released: May 30, 2014; 4. "Mr. Ambiguous" Released: June 18, 2014

Hello is the debut extended play by South Korean girl group Mamamoo. It was released by WA Entertainment on June 18, 2014 and distributed by CJ E&M Music. It contains seven songs, including the single "Mr. Ambiguous", which was used to promote the album. The album was preceded by three additional singles—collaborations with Bumkey, K.Will and Wheesung, and Geeks. The album is a mix of musical styles, including R&B, hip hop, and funk.

== Release and chart performance ==
Mamamoo's first single "Don't Be Happy", a collaboration with Bumkey, was released on January 9, 2014. Although it was not promoted, it charted at number 20 on the Gaon Digital Chart and number 24 on the Billboard Korea K-Pop Hot 100. They then released the single "Peppermint Chocolate" with K.Will (featuring Wheesung) on February 11. The song was a commercial success, charting at numbers ten and seven on the aforementioned charts. Mamamoo's third collaboration single, "Heeheehaheho", with duo Geeks, was released on May 30 and peaked at numbers 50 and 45.

On June 18, 2014, the group's first EP, Hello, was released. It contains the three previously released collaborations and four new songs, including the single "Mr. Ambiguous", which was used to promote the album. It was released in both CD and digital formats, but "Peppermint Chocolate" is only included on the CD version of the album. The album debuted at number 19 on the Gaon Album Chart in the third week of June 2014. "Mr. Ambiguous" entered the Gaon Digital Chart at number 53, and peaked at number 19 two weeks later. It also charted at number 28 on the K-Pop Hot 100. Mamamoo was surprised that the song became a hit, because it was tailored to their unique style and they did not think it had mass appeal. In November 2015, the album re-entered the Gaon Album Chart, peaking at number 16. This was due to the group gaining public attention after winning an episode of Immortal Songs: Singing the Legend. In March 2020, the album once again entered the Gaon Album Chart, peaking at number 9.

== Composition ==
The album was produced by WA Entertainment's CEO, Kim Do-hoon. "Mr. Ambiguous" was composed by Kim, with lyrics written by Min Yeon-jae and Geeks' Louie. The song is retro-inspired with a funk rhythm and a blues-rock chord progression, and showcases the group's "bluesy, soulful" voices. Lyrically, it is a warning to "Mr. Ambiguous", a man with confusing behavior who is not honest about his feelings. "Heeheehaheho" is an R&B song with a hip hop beat, written by Kim and Esna, with additional lyrics writing by Geeks and Hwasa. "Baton Touch" is a song with a funk rhythm, written by Park Woo-sang, and "I Do Me" is a self-composed hip hop solo by Hwasa. "Peppermint Chocolate" is a retro-inspired song with a funk rhythm, composed by Kim Do-hoon and Esna, with lyrics by Kim Eana and Wheesung. "Don't Be Happy" was originally written by Esna in an acoustic style, and was re-arranged into an R&B song by Kim Do-hoon.

== Promotion ==
A music video for "Mr. Ambiguous" was released in conjunction with the album. The video has a retro style and includes black-and-white shots designed to look like behind-the-scenes footage. It features cameo appearances by well-known musicians, including Lee Jong-hyun as the guitarist and "Mr. Ambiguous". In the video, Jung Joon-young is the staff director, K.Will is a photographer, Wheesung is the music video director, Rhymer is the camera director, Bumkey is the chorus, Don Spike is the pianist, and Baek Ji-young is the producer. A hidden camera prank occurs near the end of the video, starting with Baek asking Mamamoo why they are not singing live during the shoot. After they perform the song again, she criticizes the performance and says she is disappointed with the group. The members' shocked reaction to this is genuine because they were not told in advance that Baek would be acting during that scene.

The group made their stage debut on Mnet's M! Countdown on June 19. This was followed by performances on other music shows. On June 27, they had a special performance on Music Bank, performing "Peppermint Chocolate" with K.Will and VIXX's Ravi. On the July 18 episode of Music Bank, they performed a new version of "Mr. Ambiguous" with a jazzy intro, dance break, and lyrics from Michael Jackson's "Billie Jean"—part of the new lyrics were "Billie Jean is not my lover, Mamamoo is the only lover". On July 10, 2015, they appeared on You Hee-yeol's Sketchbook, where they performed a medley version of "Mr. Ambiguous" that incorporates lyrics from popular K-pop songs.

== Track listing ==
CD version
No.	Title	Lyrics	Music	Arrangement	Length
1.	"Hello"	Esna	Kim Do-hoon; Esna	Kim Do-hoon	0:43
2.	"Mr. Ambiguous" (Korean: Mr. 애매모호; RR: Mr. Aemaemoho)	Min Yeon-jae; Louie	Kim Do-hoon	Kim Do-hoon	3:41
3.	"Heeheehaheho" (히히하헤호) (with Geeks)	Esna; Kim Do-hoon; Lil Boi; Louie; Hwasa	Kim Do-hoon; Esna	Kim Do-hoon	3:44
4.	"Baton Touch"	Park Woo-sang	Park	Park	2:52
5.	"I Do Me" (내맘이야; Naemamiya; lit. "My Heart") (Hwasa solo)	Hwasa	Hwasa	Zo; Jo Jae-hyeop; Seo Ji-eun	3:07
6.	"Peppermint Chocolate" (썸남썸녀; Sseomnamsseomnyeo, lit. "Some Guy, Some Girl") (with K.Will featuring Wheesung)	Kim Eana; Wheesung	Kim Do-hoon; Esna	Lee Sang-ho	3:30
7.	"Don't Be Happy" (행복하지마; Haengbokhajima) (with Bumkey)	Esna	Esna	Kim Do-hoon	3:36
Total length:					21:13

== Charts ==
Chart (2015)	Peak position
South Korean Albums (Gaon)	16
