= Red Moon (Mamamoo EP) =

- Digital cover

EP by Mamamoo
- Released: July 16, 2018
- Recorded: 2018
- Studio: RBW Studio
- Genre: K-pop
- Length: 20:11
- Language: Korean
- Label: RBW

Mamamoo chronology
Yellow Flower (2018)	Red Moon (2018)	Blue;s (2018)

Singles from Red Moon
- 1. "Selfish" Released: May 23, 2018; 2. "Rainy Season" Released: July 1, 2018; 3. "Egotistic" Released: July 16, 2018

Red Moon is the seventh extended play by South Korean girl group Mamamoo. It was released by RBW on July 16, 2018, and distributed by LOEN Entertainment. The EP includes the lead single "Egotistic" and the previously released "Selfish," a solo track by Moonbyul featuring Seulgi of Red Velvet. It also includes the pre-release song "Rainy Season". This EP is the second album under the 4 Seasons, 4 Colors project.

== Promotion ==
=== Singles ===
"Rainy Season" (장마) served as the EP's first pre-release single and was released digitally on July 1, 2018. The single was well-received, peaking at number one on several major Korean real-time music charts, including Genie, Bugs, and Mnet, and at number two on the weekly Gaon Digital Chart.

"Egotistic" (너나 해) was released as the second official single alongside the EP release on July 16, 2018. A music video was released in conjunction with the single and was posted to both Mamamoo's official YouTube channel and the 1theK distribution channel. As of December 2022, the music video has received over 161 million views combined on both channels. The single peaked at number four on the Gaon Digital Chart, Billboard Korea K-Pop Hot 100, and Billboard World Digital Songs Sales charts. "Egotistic" earned the group two music program wins, at SBS MTV's The Show on July 24 and Mnet's M Countdown on August 2.

=== Other songs ===
"Selfish," sung by Moonbyul featuring Red Velvet member Seulgi, was released as a single on May 23, 2018, and was later included on Red Moon. The single was also released as a physical single album with two b-side tracks: the acoustic version of Moonbyul's prior solo track "Love & Hate," off of Purple (2017), and an original song titled "In My Room."

A music video for "Sky! Sky!" was released on July 13, 2018, in collaboration with the mobile game Icarus M.

== Commercial performance ==
Red Moon debuted and peaked at number three on the Gaon Album Chart for the 29th issued week of 2018. It placed at number seven on the monthly album chart for July, selling 38,564 copies. As of 2021, it has sold 63,034 copies in South Korea. In the United States, Red Moon peaked at number four on the Billboard World Albums chart. It also became the group's first entry on the Heatseekers Albums chart, entering at number 25.

== Track listing ==
No.	Title	Lyrics	Music	Arrangement	Length
1.	"Midnight Summer Dream" (여름밤의 꿈)	Cosmic Sound; Moonbyul; Cosmic Girl	Cosmic Sound; Cosmic Girl	Cosmic Sound; Cosmic Girl	3:18
2.	"Egotistic" (너나해)	Kim Do-hoon; Park Woo-sang	Kim Do-hoon; Park Woo-sang	Kim Do-hoon; Park Woo-sang	3:16
3.	"Rainy Season" (장마)	Park Woo-sang	Kim Do-hoon; Park Woo-sang	Park Woo-sang	3:42
4.	"Sky! Sky!" (하늘하늘) (청순)	Yongbae; Moonbyul; Iggy	Yongbae; Iggy	Mingky	3:21
5.	"Sleep in the Car" (잠이라도 자지)	Hwasa; Moonbyul; Solar; Kim Do-hoon	Solar; Kim Do-hoon	Lee Hoo-sang	3:22
6.	"Selfish" (Moonbyul feat. Seulgi)	Park Woo-sang	Park Woo-sang	Park Woo-sang	3:12
Total length:					20:11

== Charts ==
=== Weekly charts ===
Chart (2018)	Peak position
French Download Albums (SNEP)	48
South Korean Albums (Gaon)	3
US Heatseekers Albums (Billboard)	25
US World Albums (Billboard)	4

=== Monthly charts ===
Chart (2018)	Peak position
South Korean Albums (Gaon)	7

=== Year-end charts ===
Chart (2018)	Position
South Korean Albums (Gaon)	89
