= Mamamoo+ =

South Korean duo

- Mamamoo+ in 2026

Background information
- Origin: Seoul, South Korea
- Genre: K-pop
- Years active: 2022–present
- Label: RBW
- Spinoff of: Mamamoo
- Members: Solar; Moonbyul
- Website: Official website

Mamamoo+ (Korean: 마마무+ (Note: Also written as Korean: 마마무 플러스); RR: Mamamoo peulleoseu, stylized in all caps) is a South Korean duo formed by RBW. The first sub-unit of the girl group Mamamoo, the duo is composed of members Solar and Moonbyul. Their debut single "Better" was released on August 30, 2022. This was followed by their first single album Act 1, Scene 1, released in March 2023 to commercial success, selling over 100,000 copies on the Circle Chart in its first month. They released their first extended play Two Rabbits on August 3, 2023.

== Name ==
Since their early years with Mamamoo, Solar and Moonbyul together have been well-known by the nickname MoonSun, affectionately coined by fans as a portmanteau of their names: "Moon" from Moonbyul and "Sun" from Kim Yong-sun (Solar).

When plans to form an official sub-unit began, they considered several other names including Two Rabbits, which would later go on to become the title of their first extended play. Ultimately they decided on Mamamoo+. The name is meant to denote that they will be exploring new concepts and music, continuing to expand the horizons of their activities without limits, in addition to the existing group, Mamamoo.

Additionally, the motifs of the moon and the sun that represent each of them were incorporated into the Mamamoo+ logo when it was first revealed.

== History ==
Prior to their official debut as a sub-unit, Solar and Moonbyul had already performed and released songs together. As early as 2015, they appeared as a duo in the JTBC singing competition program Sugar Man. They performed a newly rearranged rendition of the nostalgic hit song "Like Yesterday" originally by J.ae, beating f(x)'s Luna and Amber to emerge as the final winners. The performance received attention for Solar's explosive vocals and Moonbyul's self-composed rap. The song also rose to the top of various music charts after the broadcast, sparking early requests for the two to form a sub-unit.

In 2021, Solar and Moonbyul were invited to partake in the South Korean band Vibe's 20th anniversary project REVIBE vol.1 which featured remakes of their hit songs by various artists. On July 28, 2021, the duo's remake and music video of the song "Promise U" was released.

== Career ==
=== 2022: Formation and debut with "Better" ===
In August 2022, it was announced that members Solar and Moonbyul would be forming the group's first official subunit, Mamamoo+, with an expected album release at the end of the month.

On August 22, 2022, a new YouTube channel was launched by surprise, uploading a video titled "Looking for a New Member of MAMAMOO". The channel was revealed to be created for the mockumentary series of the same name, which stars Solar and Moonbyul as they "search" for a new member to join them via auditions. In the following days, spoiler photos were released which teased another artist who would be joining them as part of their debut song. The duo's debut single "Better" featuring rapper Big Naughty, was released on August 30.

=== 2023–present: Act 1 Scene 1, Two Rabbits and overseas performances ===
Mamamoo+ announced their first comeback in March 2023, set to consist of a single album, preceded by a digital single. On March 21, they released the digital single "Chico Malo", which blends Latin trap beats and traditional Korean instruments such as the gayageum (plucked string instrument) and daegeum (bamboo flute). The duo's first single album, Act 1, Scene 1, was released on March 29. Billboard described the music videos from the album as "fresh visual treats", highlighting the intricate fan choreography and modernized versions of classic Korean outfits, the hanbok. As commended in the review, "not only is MAMAMOO+ experimenting and expanding with their music but with their visual storytelling too." Within a month of release, the album Act 1, Scene 1 surpassed 100,000 copies sold on the Circle Chart.

On July 7, it was reported that Mamamoo+ would be releasing new music in August 2023. The pre-release single "Save Me" was released on July 18, along with a music video to accompany the pensive, lingering R&B track. Upon release, "Save Me" entered the Top 10 on the iTunes Top Song Chart in ten countries and regions around the world. It also achieved a peak chart position of 14th on the Worldwide iTunes Top Song Chart. Their debut extended play Two Rabbits was released on August 3.

From the summer of 2023 onwards and upon the conclusion of Mamamoo's My Con world tour, the duo have been invited to perform at multiple festivals and concerts overseas. Starting with the Kaohsiung Beer Rock Festival held in Taiwan on July 9, Mamamoo+ performed to a crowd of 28,000 people, followed by Waterbomb Japan held in Osaka, Nagoya and Tokyo on the 15th, 22nd and 29 July respectively.

Their upcoming appearances include: The Super Stage By K-Pop held at the Mall of Asia Arena on August 11 in Manila, Philippines, RBW SUMMER FES ~Over the Rainbow~ at Tokyo Garden Theater from August 19 to 20 in Tokyo, Japan, KPOP BANG at the Veltins Arena on September 9 in Gelsenkirchen, Germany, and KPOP NATION at the PGE Narodowy Stadium on September 23 in Warsaw, Poland. This is expected to continue into the second half of the year, with the potential of a global tour as well.

== Discography ==
=== Extended plays ===
List of extended plays, with details, chart positions, and certifications shown.
Title	Details	Peak chart positions	Sales
Title	Details	KOR	Sales
Two Rabbits	Released: August 3, 2023; Label: RBW; Format: CD, digital download, streaming	10	KOR: 77,563

=== Single albums ===
List of single albums, with album details, chart positions, and certifications shown.
Title	Details	Peak chart positions	Sales
Title	Details	KOR	Sales
Act 1, Scene 1	Released: March 29, 2023; Label: RBW; Format: CD, digital download, streaming	3	KOR: 101,295

=== Singles ===
==== As lead artist ====
List of singles, with selected chart positions, sales, and certifications
Title	Year	Peak chart positions	Album
Title	Year	KOR	Album
"Better" (featuring Big Naughty)	2022	140	Non-album single
"Chico Malo" (나쁜놈)	2023	174	Act 1, Scene 1
"GGBB"	2023	185	Act 1, Scene 1
"Save Me" (지구에 혼자 남게 된다면)	2023	— (Note: "Save Me" did not enter the Circle Digital Chart, but it peaked at number 25 on the component Circle Download Chart.)	Two Rabbits
"DangDang" (댕댕)	2023	— (Note: "DangDang" did not enter the Circle Digital Chart, but it peaked at number 30 on the component Circle Download Chart.)	Two Rabbits
"—" denotes that a release did not chart or was not released in that region.

=== Soundtrack appearances ===
List of soundtrack appearances, with selected chart positions, sales, and certifications
Title	Year	Peak chart positions	Album
Title	Year	KOR Down.	Album
"Super Gap" (박세리 테마곡)	2023	117	The Queens OST Part 4

=== Other charted songs ===
List of other charted songs, with selected chart positions, sales, and certifications
Title	Year	Peak chart positions	Album
Title	Year	KOR Down.	Album
"LLL"	2023	61	Act 1, Scene 1
"Intro: Two Rabbits" (두 마리 토끼)	2023	93	Two Rabbits
"I Like This"	2023	69	Two Rabbits
"Starry Sea" (별이 빛나는 바다)	2023	66	Two Rabbits

== Tours and concerts ==
MAMAMOO+ 1st Fan Concert: Two Rabbits Code – Asia Tour

Concert dates
Date	City	Country	Venue	Attendance
September 16, 2023	Seoul	South Korea	Yes24 Live Hall	—
September 17, 2023	Seoul	South Korea	Yes24 Live Hall	—
October 8, 2023	Osaka	Japan	Orix Theater	—
October 9, 2023	Osaka	Japan	Orix Theater	—
October 22, 2023	Taipei	Taiwan	Taipei International Convention Center	—
November 15, 2023	Singapore		The Star Theatre	—
November 17, 2023	Bangkok	Thailand	Chaengwattana Hall	—
November 18, 2023	Jakarta	Indonesia	Sutera Hall	—
December 17, 2023	Manila	Philippines	New Frontier Theater	—
December 20, 2023	Hong Kong	China	Hong Kong Convention and Exhibition Centre	—
