= Idol Drama Operation Team =

2017 South Korean television show

- Promotional Poster
- Genre: Reality; Drama
- Directed by: Ko Kuk-jin
- Presented by: KBS
- Country of origin: South Korea
- Original language: Korean
- No. of seasons: 1
- No. of episodes: 13

Production
- Production location: South Korea
- Running time: Varies

Original release
- Network: KBS
- Release: May 29 – June 25, 2017

Idol Drama Operation Team
- Also known as: Let's Only Walk The Flower Road
- Genre: Autobiography
- Written by: Joo Ki-bbeum; Min So-young; Ahn Jong-mi; Bae Il; Han Da-won; Moon Byul-yi; Kang Seul-gi; Yoo Si-A; Kim So-hee; Jo Eun-chae; Ryu Su-jeong; Jeon So-mi
- Directed by: Ko Kuk-jin
- Starring: Moonbyul; Seulgi; Kim So-hee; D.ana; YooA; Sujeong; Jeon Somi
- Country of origin: South Korea
- Original language: Korean
- No. of episodes: 8

Production
- Executive producer: Kim Young-do
- Producer: Won Jong-jae
- Production location: South Korea
- Editor: Jung Il-won
- Running time: Varies

Original release
- Network: KBS
- Release: June 26 – July 3, 2017

Idol Drama Operation Team (Korean: 아이돌 드라마 공작단) was a 2017 South Korean web variety program. The program was presented through Naver TVCast and Naver V App every Monday, Wednesday, and Friday at 11:00 (KST), starting from May 29, 2017. Starting June 10, it was then aired on KBS Joy (KBS N) and KBS World. The show invited seven girl group members to create their very own Korean drama series by becoming accredited scriptwriters as well as acting in the series as fictional versions of themselves.

The drama they had worked on was named Let's Only Walk The Flower Road (꽃길만 걷자; Kkotgilman geotja), an autobiographical drama. The first episode of the drama debuted on June 26, at 11:00 (KST) through Naver TVCast and Naver V App. It aired daily for 8 episodes until July 3, 2017.

On July 4, each member's full performances for The Five was revealed, as unrevealed scenes of the drama. Girls Next Door (옆집소녀), the group produced through the show, then made their official debut on Music Bank on July 14.

== Cast ==
=== Members of Girls Next Door ===
- Moonbyul as Moon Byul-yi, also the leader of the group
- Seulgi as Kang Seul-gi
- Kim So-hee as Kim So-hee
- D.ana as Jo Eun-ae
- YooA as Yoo Shi-ah
- Ryu Su-jeong as Ryu Su-jeong
- Jeon Somi as Jeon So-mi

=== Guest appearances for Let's Only Walk The Flower Road ===
- Jang Won-young as IM Entertainment's Director Jang, and judge of The Five (Episodes 1-8)
  - Also the acting coach of the 7 girl group members before filming of the drama
- Jeon So-min as Jeon So-min, a 1st generation idol, senior of Girls Next Door (Episodes 1, 8)
- Shin Hyun-joon as the PD of Music Bank (Episodes 1, 7)
- Baek A-yeon as Baek A-yeon, the other 1st place nominee on Music Bank (Episodes 1, 8)
- Snuper as performers on Music Bank (Episodes 1, 8)
- Sonamoo as performers on Music Bank (Episodes 1, 8)
- MASC as performers on Music Bank (Episodes 1, 8)
- Victon as performers on Music Bank (Episodes 1, 8)
- Momoland as performers on Music Bank (Episodes 1, 8)
- Kim Jong-min as jokbal delivery man (Episode 2)
- Im Won-hee as IM Entertainment's CEO Im, and judge of The Five (Episodes 2-8)
- Kwon Oh-joong as friend of Director Jang (Episode 2)
- Bae Yoon-jung as the dance teacher for Girls Next Door, and judge of The Five (Episodes 3, 4, 8)
- Jun Hyun-moo as the MC of The Five (Episode 4)
- Gaeko as rap teacher for Moon Byul-yi (Episode 5)
- Choiza as rap teacher for Moon Byul-yi (Episode 5)
- Chungha as Kim Chung-ha, artist of another company (Episodes 5, 6)
- Kim Geun-soo as the CEO of Chung-ha's company (Episode 5)
- Sung Byung-sook as So-hee's grandmother (Episode 5)
- Jinyoung as Girls Next Door's senior, former IM Entertainment trainee (Episodes 6, 7)
  - Also the songwriter/producer for Deep Blue Eyes
- Woo Hye-rim as the recorder of the viral Girls Next Door fancam (Episode 8)
- Kangnam as the MC of Music Bank (Episode 8)
- Nahyun as the MC of Music Bank (Episode 8)

== Episodes ==
=== Idol Drama Operation Team ===
| Episodes # | Broadcast Date | Episode runtime |
|---|---|---|
| 1 | May 29, 2017 | 20:52 |
| 2 | May 31, 2017 | 15:10 |
| 3 | June 2, 2017 | 23:16 |
| 4 | June 5, 2017 | 15:08 |
| 5 | June 7, 2017 | 19:46 |
| 6 | June 9, 2017 | 13:13 |
| 7 | June 12, 2017 | 15:11 |
| 8 | June 14, 2017 | 25:11 |
| 9 | June 16, 2017 | 17:05 |
| 10 | June 19, 2017 | 17:50 |
| 11 | June 21, 2017 | 7:27 |
| 12 | June 23, 2017 | 10:47 |
| 13 | June 25, 2017 | 23:05 |

=== Let's Only Walk The Flower Road ===
The episode title is based on each girl's original group popular title track (except Sonamoo).

| Episodes # | Broadcast Date | Episode title | Episode runtime |
|---|---|---|---|
| 1 | June 26, 2017 | Dumb Dumb (Red Velvet) | 11:52 |
| 2 | June 27, 2017 | Unknowingly Unknowingly / Molae Molae (I.B.I) | 13:30 |
| 3 | June 28, 2017 | Windy Day (Oh My Girl) | 12:32 |
| 4 | June 29, 2017 | Pick Me (Produce 101/I.O.I) | 11:38 |
| 5 | June 30, 2017 | My 1 cm Ego (Mamamoo) | 13:33 |
| 6 | July 1, 2017 | Decalcomanie (Mamamoo) | 13:34 |
| 7 | July 2, 2017 | Now, We (Lovelyz) | 11:36 |
| 8 | July 3, 2017 | Deep Blue Eyes (Girls Next Door) | 8:19 |

== Original soundtrack ==
=== OST Part 1 ===
| No. | Title | Lyrics | Music | Artist | Length |
|---|---|---|---|---|---|
| 1. | "Parasol" (파라솔) | Subin (Dal Shabet); Super Bomb | Subin (Dal Shabet); Super Bomb; Lee Soo-min | Subin (Dal Shabet) | 03:16 |
| 2. | "Parasol" (Inst.) | | Subin (Dal Shabet); Super Bomb; Lee Soo-min | | 03:16 |
| Total length: | | | | | 06:32 |

=== OST Part 2 ===
| No. | Title | Lyrics | Music | Artist | Length |
|---|---|---|---|---|---|
| 1. | "Deep Blue Eyes (Prod. By Jinyoung)" | Jinyoung (B1A4); Moonbyul (Mamamoo); D.ana (Sonamoo) | Jinyoung (B1A4); Kang Myung-shin | Girls Next Door | 03:28 |
| 2. | "Deep Blue Eyes (Prod. By Jinyoung)" (Inst.) | | Jinyoung (B1A4); Kang Myung-shin | | 03:28 |
| Total length: | | | | | 06:56 |

=== OST Part 3 ===
| No. | Title | Lyrics | Music | Artist | Length |
|---|---|---|---|---|---|
| 1. | "Weather Caster (All Day Sunny)" (기상캐스터(온종일 맑음)) | Topic of Changan; U-Star; Victory Winter; Rambo | Topic of Changan | Grace | 03:19 |
| 2. | "Weather Caster (All Day Sunny)" (Inst.) | | Topic of Changan | | 03:19 |
| Total length: | | | | | 06:38 |

=== OST Part 4 ===
| No. | Title | Lyrics | Music | Artist | Length |
|---|---|---|---|---|---|
| 1. | "You can feel it" | Kim Hyun-soo | Kim Hyun-soo | U Sung-eun | 03:56 |
| 2. | "You can feel it" (Inst.) | | Kim Hyun-soo | | 03:56 |
| Total length: | | | | | 07:52 |

=== Charted songs ===
| Title | Year | Peak chart positions | Sales | Remarks |
| Title | Year | KOR Gaon | Sales | Remarks |
|---|---|---|---|---|
| "Deep Blue Eyes" (Girls Next Door) | 2017 | — | KOR: 16,514+ | Part 2 |

== Awards and nominations ==
=== Melon Music Awards ===
| Year | Nominee / work | Award | Result |
|---|---|---|---|
| 2017 | Girls Next Door - Deep Blue Eyes | Hot Trend Award | Nominated |
