= Melting (album) =

- Digital cover

Studio album by Mamamoo
- Released: February 26, 2016
- Genres: K-pop; dance; R&B
- Length: 45:44
- Language: Korean
- Label: RBW
- Producer: Kim Do-hoon

Mamamoo chronology
| Pink Funky (2015) | Melting (2016) | Memory (2016) |

Singles from Melting
- 1. "I Miss You" Released: January 29, 2016; 2. "Taller Than You" Released: February 12, 2016; 3. "You're the Best" Released: February 25, 2016

Melting is the debut studio album by South Korean girl group Mamamoo. It was released by RBW on February 26, 2016 and distributed by CJ E&M Music. It contains twelve songs, including the single "You're the Best", which was used to promote the album. The album was preceded by two additional singles, "I Miss You" and "Taller Than You".

== Release and promotion ==
On January 29, 2016, Mamamoo released the single "I Miss You" from their upcoming studio album. On February 2, the group's agency, RBW, confirmed the album's release date. A second single, "Taller Than You", was released on February 12. The full track list of the album was revealed on February 18, and the album was released on February 26, along with the single "You're the Best". The song "Girl Crush" is from the soundtrack of the video game Innisia Nest, and was originally released as a single on September 16, 2015. A music video for "You're the Best" was released in conjunction with the album; in the video, the members are vacationing in Thailand and fall in the love with the employee who checks them into the hotel.

On February 25, Mamamoo held a media showcase for the album at the Yes24 Move Hall in Seogyo-dong, Seoul, as well as a fan showcase at a concert hall in Paju, Gyeonggi Province. They began promoting on music shows that same day with a performance on M! Countdown. All three singles were performed on music shows, and their February 27 performance on Show! Music Core became the most viewed video on Naver TV Cast. On March 6, the group won their first music show award on Inkigayo for "You're the Best". They also won awards on Show Champion, M! Countdown, and Music Bank that same week. On March 16, they performed at K-Pop Night Out at SXSW in Austin, Texas.

== Composition ==
The album was produced by RBW's CEO Kim Do-hoon, and all four Mamamoo members participated in songwriting. "Taller Than You" is a hip hop song with a trap beat drop, written by Kim with lyrics co-written with Moonbyul, Solar, and Hwasa. The song is a comical rap battle inspired by the members' height difference of one centimeter. "Words Don't Come Easy" is jazz-influenced song with a bossa nova melody written by Kim and Park Woo-sang, with additional lyrics writing by Esna. "You're the Best" is a dance song with a "retro groove", with three key and tempo changes. It was written by Kim, with lyrics by Moonbyul and Solar, and music by Duble Sidekick. "Friday Night", featuring Junggigo, is an uptempo R&B song written by Park, with additional lyrics by Moonbyul. "My Hometown" is a holiday-themed song with lyrics by Kim and Mamamoo, and music by Kim and Solar. It was the first song with lyrics by all four members, and they said it was not easy to put their feelings into it.

"Emotion" is a medium-tempo song written by Cosmic Sound and Cosmic Girl, with lyrics by Moonbyul. "I Miss You" is an R&B ballad written by Cosmic Sound, Hwang Yoo-bin, and Moonbyul, with music by Kim. "Funky Boy" is upbeat, retro-inspired song with lyrics by Yoon Hye-joo and music by Daniel Palm and Ellen Berg Tollbom. "Recipe" was written by Park, Solar, and Hwasa, with additional lyrics by Moonbyul and music by Kim. "Cat Fight" was written by Lee Hoo-sang, with music co-composed by S2REN and additional lyrics by Hwang and Moonbyul. "Recipe" and "Cat Fight" are both retro style songs that fit into the doo-wop and swing genres. "Just" is a "soulful" ballad written by Park, and "Girl Crush" is an upbeat song written by Park, with lyrics co-written by Jang Yoon-seo.

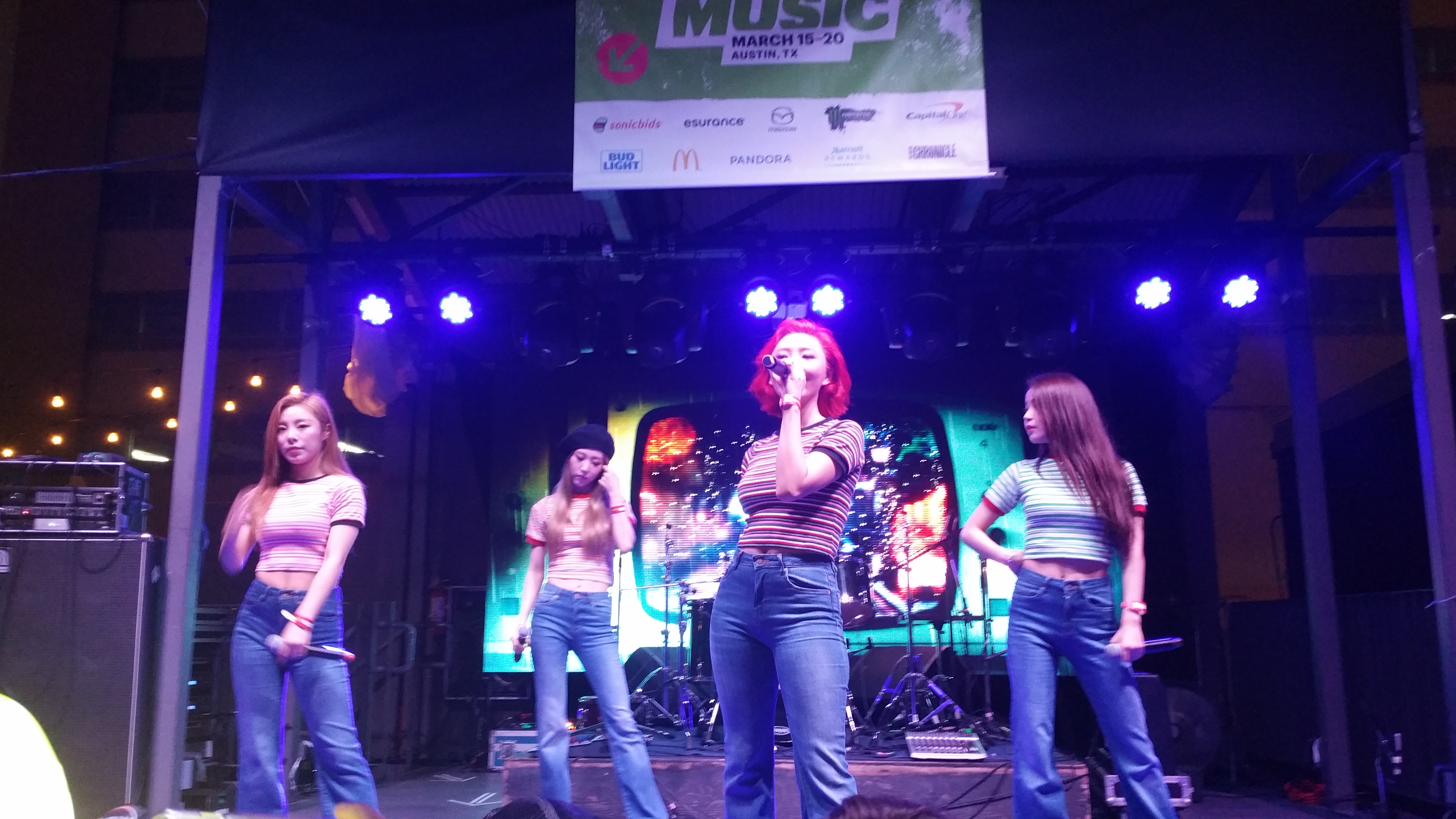
Mamamoo performing at K-Pop Night Out at SXSW in March 2016

== Critical reception ==
Music critics gave the album generally positive reviews. Tamar Herman, writing for Billboard, said the album "brings a retro soul feel back to the K-pop world, heralding the Korean quartet's rise to the top ranks of the girl group hunger games". She described it as an atypical K-pop album, which takes the "tunes of yesterday and gives them a modern feel". She commended the group for trying a different style with "Taller Than You" and said they pulled off the humorous lyrics to "pure perfection". About "You're The Best", she said it was Mamamoo's answer to "Lady Marmalade" and "makes the most of each members' distinct vocal colors". In conclusion, she said the group "simply shines in a way not seen by most K-pop girl groups".

Fuse's Jeff Benjamin said "You're the Best" was possibly the group's best single and music video to date, and described the song as having a "throwback style" blended with "feel-good bubblegum pop". He also noted the group's vocal cohesion and "on-point harmonies", and said the music video showcased their "fun personalities". After seeing Mamamoo's performance at the SXSW music festival, American singer-songwriter Siedah Garrett said she would love to work on the group's next project, and Hollywood actress Chloë Grace Moretz praised "Taller Than You" on Twitter after seeing a performance on Korean television.

Melting on critic lists
| Publication | List | Work | Rank | Ref. |
|---|---|---|---|---|
| Billboard | The 25 Greatest K-Pop Albums of the 2010s | Melting | 7 | |
| Billboard | The 100 Greatest K-Pop Songs of the 2010s | "You're the Best" | 32 | |

== Commercial performance ==
Melting entered the Gaon Album Chart at number three, and peaked at number two the following week. It also charted at number eight on the Billboard World Albums chart. It was the sixth best selling album in South Korea during the month of February, selling 18,295 physical copies. As of May 2016, it has sold more than 32,000 units. "I Miss You" peaked at number seven on the Gaon Digital Chart the week of February 7, and "Taller Than You" peaked at number five the following week. "You're the Best" topped the chart the week of February 28, and "Friday Night", "Words Don't Come Easy", and "Emotion" also charted. The music videos for "Taller Than You" and "You're the Best" were the fourth and seventh most viewed K-pop music videos worldwide during the month of February.

== Track listing ==
| No. | Title | Lyrics | Music | Arrangement | Length |
|---|---|---|---|---|---|
| 1. | "Taller Than You" (Korean: 1cm의 자존심; RR: 1cm-ui Jajunsim, lit. "Pride of 1cm") | Kim Do-hoon; Moonbyul; Solar; Hwasa | Kim Do-hoon | Kim Do-hoon; Park Woo-sang | 3:04 |
| 2. | "Words Don't Come Easy" (우리끼리; Urikkiri) | Kim Do-hoon; Park Woo-sang; Esna | Kim Do-hoon; Park Woo-sang | Park Woo-sang | 3:56 |
| 3. | "You're the Best" (넌 is 뭔들; Neon is Mwondeul) | Kim Do-hoon; Moonbyul; Solar | Kim Do-Hoon; Duble Sidekick | Kim Do-hoon | 3:50 |
| 4. | "Friday Night" (금요일밤; Geumyoilbam) (featuring Junggigo) | Park Woo-sang; Moonbyul | Park Woo-sang | Park Woo-sang | 3:22 |
| 5. | "My Hometown" (고향이; Gohyang-i) | Kim Do-hoon; Solar; Moonbyul; Wheein; Hwasa | Kim Do-hoon; Solar | Kim Do-hoon | 3:21 |
| 6. | "Emotion" | Cosmic Sound; Cosmic Girl; Moonbyul | Cosmic Sound; Cosmic Girl | Cosmic Sound; Cosmic Girl; Kang Min-hoon | 3:27 |
| 7. | "I Miss You" | Cosmic Sound; Hwang Yoo-bin; Moonbyul | Kim Do-hoon | Lee Hyeon-seung | 4:16 |
| 8. | "Funky Boy" | Yoon Hye-joo | Daniel Palm; Ellen Berg Tollbom | Park Woo-sang | 3:35 |
| 9. | "Recipe" (나만의 Recipe; Naman-ui Recipe) | Solar; Hwasa; Moonbyul; Park Woo-sang | Kim Do-hoon; Park Woo-sang; Solar; Hwasa | Kim Do-hoon; Park Woo-sang | 2:49 |
| 10. | "Cat Fight" (고양이; Goyang-i, lit. "Cat") | Hwang; Lee Hoo-sang; Moonbyul | Lee Hoo-sang; S2REN | Lee Hoo-sang | 3:26 |
| 11. | "Just" | Park Woo-sang | Park Woo-sang | Park Woo-sang | 3:41 |
| 12. | "Girl Crush" | Jang Yoon-seo; Park Woo-sang | Park Woo-sang | Park Woo-sang | 3:08 |
| 13. | "You're the Best" (Instrumental) | | Kim Do-hoon; Duble Sidekick | Kim Do-hoon | 3:49 |
| Total length: | | | | | 45:44 |

== Charts ==
=== Weekly charts ===
Weekly chart performance for Melting
| Chart (2016) | Peak position |
|---|---|
| South Korean Albums (Gaon) | 2 |
| US World Albums (Billboard) | 8 |

=== Year-end charts ===
2016 year-end chart performance for Melting
| Chart (2016) | Position |
|---|---|
| South Korean Albums (Gaon) | 73 |

== Accolades ==
Awards and nominations
| Awards | Year | Category | Nominee | Result |
|---|---|---|---|---|
| Gaon Chart Music Awards | 2016 | Song of the Year – February | "You're the Best" | Won |
| Golden Disc Awards | 2017 | Digital Song Bonsang | "You're the Best" | Won |
| Golden Disc Awards | 2017 | Digital Daesang | "You're the Best" | Nominated |
| Melon Music Awards | 2016 | Best Female Dance | "You're the Best" | Nominated |
| Mnet Asian Music Awards | 2017 | Best Vocal Performance Group | "You're the Best" | Nominated |

Music program awards
| Song | Program | Date |
|---|---|---|
| "You're the Best" | Inkigayo | March 6, 2016 |
| "You're the Best" | Inkigayo | March 13, 2016 |
| "You're the Best" | Show Champion | March 9, 2016 |
| "You're the Best" | Show Champion | March 16, 2016 |
| "You're the Best" | M Countdown | March 10, 2016 |
| "You're the Best" | Music Bank | March 11, 2016 |
| "You're the Best" | Music Bank | March 18, 2016 |
| "You're the Best" | The Show | March 15, 2016 |

== Release history ==
Release history for Melting
| Region | Date | Format | Label | Ref. |
|---|---|---|---|---|
| Various | February 26, 2016 | CD; Digital download; streaming | RBW; Kakao M | |
