= Pink Funky =

EP by Mamamoo
- Released: June 19, 2015
- Genres: K-pop; R&B; dance
- Length: 20:16
- Language: Korean
- Label: RBW
- Producer: Kim Do-hoon

Mamamoo chronology
| Piano Man (2014) | Pink Funky (2015) | Melting (2016) |

Singles from Pink Funky
- 1. "Ahh Oop!" Released: April 2, 2015; 2. "Um Oh Ah Yeh" Released: June 19, 2015

Pink Funky is the third extended play by South Korean girl group Mamamoo. It was released by RBW on June 19, 2015 and distributed by CJ E&M Music. It contains six songs, including the singles "Ahh Oop!" (a collaboration with Esna) and "Um Oh Ah Yeh". The album was the group's most successful to date, debuting at number six on the Gaon Album Chart and selling more than 13,000 units. Musically, the album is a mix of genres including R&B, hip hop, and funk.

== Release and promotion ==
On April 2, 2015, Mamamoo released a surprise collaboration single with Esna, titled "Ahh Oop!". It was promoted on music shows for two weeks, starting with M! Countdown that same day. The retro style music video for "Ahh Oop!" was produced and directed by Digipedi.

On June 11, Mamamoo announced the upcoming release of Pink Funky and lead single "Um Oh Ah Yeh". The full track list was revealed on June 17, and the album was released two days later. One reason the album was released in June was so the group could participate in university campus festivals in September, where girl groups are often invited to perform. In the music video for "Um Oh Ah Yeh", three of the members dress up as men, wearing wigs, beards, and prosthetic makeup. Park Bo-ram makes a cameo appearance as the girl who tells Solar that Moonbyul is actually a woman.

On June 14, Mamamoo held guerilla concerts in Daehangno and Hongdae, where they performed "Um Oh Ah Yeh" for the first time. The group held a comeback showcase for the album at Ilchi Art Hall in Cheongdam-dong, Seoul on June 18. The album was then promoted for six weeks on various music shows, ending with Inkigayo on July 26.

== Composition ==
The album was produced by RBW's CEO Kim Do-hoon. "Um Oh Ah Yeh" was written by Kim and three of the Mamamoo members—Solar, Moonbyul, and Hwasa. It is a "funky" R&B dance song with elements of 1990s synthpop. Lyrically, the song is about a girl who is in love with a man who is actually another girl. "Freakin Shoes" is a trap and hip hop song written by Hwasa, with music co-composed by Kim and Seo Jae-woo. "A Little Bit" is a pop ballad and "Self Camera" is a medium tempo R&B song. "No No No", written by Seo Yong-bae and Park Woo-sang, has a 1960s funk rhythm. "Ahh Oop!" was described as a funky dance song with a retro rhythm and blues guitar riff. It was written by Esna, and the lyrics tell men to stop using cliché pick-up lines and treat women with respect. The digital album released in South Korea includes an a cappella version of "Um Oh Ah Yeh", as well as instrumentals for "Um Oh Ah Yeh" and "A Little Bit".

== Reception ==
The album entered the Gaon Album Chart at number six, and charted at number seven on the Billboard World Albums Chart. It was the 19th best selling album in South Korea during the month of June, selling 3,822 physical copies. As of May 2016, it has sold more than 13,000 units. "Um Oh Ah Yeh" entered the Gaon Digital Chart at number 22 and peaked at number three the following week, becoming Mamamoo's then-highest charting single. "Ahh Oop!" entered the Gaon Digital Chart at number 76 and peaked at 67 the following week.

The release of Pink Funky solidified Mamamoo's reputation as a girl group who can sing well, and their popularity rose with the success of "Um Oh Ah Yeh". This was partly due to the music video, which went viral on Facebook and "sent shockwaves through the K-pop scene", according to Yonhap's Chung Joo-won. Scott Interrante, writing for PopMatters, said the album "features a more polished mainstream sound while retaining the focus of [Mamamoo's] powerful vocals".

== Track listing ==
CD and international digital version
| No. | Title | Lyrics | Music | Arrangement | Length |
|---|---|---|---|---|---|
| 1. | "Freakin Shoes" | Hwasa | Kim Do-hoon; Seo Jae-woo; Hwasa | Seo Jae-woo | 2:59 |
| 2. | "Um Oh Ah Yeh" (음오아예) | Kim Do-hoon; Solar; Moonbyul; Hwasa | Kim Do-hoon | Seo Jae-woo | 3:34 |
| 3. | "A Little Bit" (따끔; Ttakkeum, lit. "Sting") | Hwang Seong-jin; Kim Chang-rak; Lee Eun-ji | Hwang; Kim Chang-rak; Lee Seung-yeop | Kim Chang-rak | 3:49 |
| 4. | "No No No" (갑과 을; Gapgwa Eul) | Seo Yong-bae; Park Woo-sang; Moonbyul | Seo Yong-bae; Park Woo-sang | Park Woo-sang | 3:16 |
| 5. | "Self Camera" | Kim Se-moon; Park Woo-sang | Park Woo-sang | Park Woo-sang | 3:17 |
| 6. | "Ahh Oop!" (아훕!) (with Esna) | Esna | Esna | Choi Yong-chan | 3:21 |
| Total length: | | | | | 20:16 |

Korean digital version – bonus tracks
| No. | Title | Lyrics | Music | Arrangement | Length |
|---|---|---|---|---|---|
| 7. | "Um Oh Ah Yeh" (Acappella version) | Kim Do-hoon; Solar; Moonbyul; Hwasa | Kim Do-hoon | Jeon Seung-woo | 1:33 |
| 8. | "Um Oh Ah Yeh" (Instrumental) | | Kim Do-hoon | Seo Jae-woo | 3:33 |
| 9. | "A Little Bit" (Instrumental) | | Hwang Seong-jin; Kim Chang-rak; Lee Seung-yeop | Kim Chang-rak | 3:44 |
| Total length: | | | | | 29:06 |

== Charts ==
| Chart (2015) | Peak position |
|---|---|
| South Korean Albums (Gaon) | 6 |
| US World Albums (Billboard) | 7 |
