= Esna (singer) =

American singer-songwriter (born 1987)

- Also known as: Yoon Bitnara
- Born: Esther Nara Yoon; November 7, 1987 (age 38); Los Angeles, California, U.S.
- Genres: R&B; Ballad; Jazz
- Occupations: Singer-songwriter; Composer
- Instruments: Vocal, piano
- Years active: 2012–present

Korean name
- Hangul: 윤빛나라
- RR: Yun Bitnara
- MR: Yun Pinnara

Esther Nara Yoon (born November 7, 1987), known professionally as Esna (Korean: 에스나, stylized as eSNa), is an American singer-songwriter active in South Korea. Her first extended play, eSNa The Singer, was released in October 2015. She has also written songs for other artists, including the 2014 hit single "Some".

== Career ==
Esna was born in Los Angeles, California and graduated from UCLA, where she studied jazz vocals. She started her music career by uploading cover songs on YouTube, and moved to South Korea in 2010. Her first Korean song was the duet song "Daksal Couple" (닭살커플) by a Korean-American singer Tim. In 2011, she was a contestant on the singing competition program Superstar K3 (under her Korean name, Yoon Bitnara), and was eliminated during the rival mission. She was eventually signed to WA Entertainment (now Rainbow Bridge World). She said she had a difficult time until she "accepted Korea as [her] home" in 2013. That same year, she formed a collaboration project with Kero One, named Kesna Music. Their single "Is It Love?" was released in July 2013. Her first solo release in South Korea was the song "Bite My Lower Lips" for the soundtrack of the television drama The Heirs, released in October. "Mistletoe", a Christmas collaboration with Geeks and Phantom, co-written by Esna, was released in December.

As a songwriter, her breakthrough was the song "Some", written for Soyou and Junggigo (featuring Lil Boi of Geeks), released in February 2014. Esna wrote the song with her agency's CEO, Kim Do-hoon, and Min Yeon-jae, Xepy, Lil Boi and Junggigo. It spent six weeks at the top of the Billboard Korea K-Pop Hot 100, tying the all-time chart record. In an interview, she said the song was "unintentionally easy to write" and was partly based on her own experiences. Most of Esna's compositions are inspired by R&B, jazz and swing, including Wheesung and Gummy's "Special Love" and songs written for RBW's girl group Mamamoo. Esna was credited as a songwriter for four songs on Mamamoo's debut album Hello and co-composed both songs on Piano Man. On one song, "Gentleman", Esna also sang in collaboration with Mamamoo.

In March 2015, Esna and Seulong released the song "Destiny", for the soundtrack of the television drama Hogu's Love. It was written and produced by Esna, and was the main theme for Seulong's character in the drama. In April, Esna and Mamamoo released the collaboration single "Ahh Oop!", from Mamamoo's album Pink Funky. The song was written by Esna, with lyrics telling men to stop using cliché pick-up lines and treat women with respect. It was promoted on music shows for two weeks and had an accompanying music video produced and directed by Digipedi. After the song's release, Esna received derisive comments about her appearance from Korean netizens. She then released a remake of the song, titled "Ahh Shit!", which includes the lyrics "All my ladies out there, you're beautiful just the way you are". The remake received a positive review, and Esna stated that she wants to change the image-focused nature of K-pop.

On October 22, 2015, Esna released her first extended play, eSNa The Singer. It contains the previously released single "A Little Lovin" and a solo version of "Ahh Oop!", as well as the single "Me, Today". "Me, Today" features San E on the Korean version of the song, and Flowsik on the English version. Esna held a "listening party" at the D Bridge club in Cheongdam-dong to celebrate the album's release.

In April 2016, Esna became the DJ for the Arirang Radio program Sound K.

== Discography ==
=== Extended play ===
Title
Album details
Notes
eSNa The Singer
- Released: October 22, 2015
- Label: Rainbow Bridge World, TSN Company
- Format: Digital download

No.	Title	Length
1.	"A Little Lovin"	3:16
2.	"Lullaby" (자장가)	3:13
3.	"Me, Today" (with San E)	3:31
4.	"Better Than Average"	2:47
5.	"I Just" (오빠 보고싶어요)	3:13
6.	"Ahh Oop!" (아훕!)	3:09
7.	"Me, Today" (English Version) (with Flowisk)	3:29
8.	"A Little Lovin" (English Version)	3:15

Have A Drink
- Released: February 20, 2019
- Label: Warner Music Korea, BRANDNEW MUSIC, eSNa
- Format: Digital download

No.	Title	Length
1.	"You Deserve It" (좋겠어)	3:29
2.	"ZgtZgt" (지긋지긋 feat. Hanhae)	3:25
3.	"Spoon"	2:43

=== Singles ===
Title	Year	Peak chart positions		Album
Title	Year	KOR Gaon	KOR Hot 100	Album
"What I See" (Prepix featuring Yong Jun-hyung, Beenzino, and Esna)	2012	—	—	Non-album singles
"Is It Love?" (with Kero One)	2013	—	—	Non-album singles
"Bite My Lower Lips" (아랫입술 물고)	2013	73	44	The Heirs OST 1
"Mistletoe" (with Geeks and Phantom)	2013	24	—	Wayogayo Vol. 1
"I, I Love You"	2014	—	—	Non-album single
"A Little Lovin"	2015	—	—	eSNa The Singer
"Destiny" (with Seulong)	2015	—	—	Hogu's Love OST
"Ahh Oop!" (with Mamamoo)	2015	67	—	Pink Funky
"Me, Today" (featuring San E)	2015	—	—	eSNa The Singer
"I Remember" (Innovator featuring Esna)	2016	—	—	Non-album singles
"No Thanks"	2016	—	—	Non-album singles
"Attention"	2016	—	—	Non-album singles
"It's Hot." (뜨거워요) (feat. Don Mills & Esna)	2016	—	—	Non-album singles
"Love Comes" (with Hwasa of Mamamoo)	2017	—	—	Non-album singles
"Spoon"	2019	—	—	Have A Drink
"Could We Fall In Love Again" (우린 다시 사랑할 수 있을까)	2021	—	—	Hanpuri Project
"I Want To Be In Love" (사랑하고 싶어)	2021	—	—	Hanpuri Project
"Playboy" (나쁜 자식)	2021	—	—	Hanpuri Project
"—" denotes releases that did not chart or were not released in that region.

=== Other appearances ===
Song	Year	Artist	Album
"The Fast Life"	2010	Kero One feat. Esna	Kinetic World
"Leaving Las Vegas"	2014	Yoon Do-hyun & eSNa	Singing Yoon Do Hyun
"Gentleman"	2014	Mamamoo feat. Esna	Piano Man
"Lost in Myself"	2017	San E feat. Esna	Season of Suffering
"~42"	2017	Primary feat. Sam Kim, eSNa	Shininryu (신인류)
"Just Be the Way You Are"	2018	Hanhae feat. Esna	Organic Life

=== Songwriting for other artists ===
Song	Year	Artist	Album	Contribution
"Only U"	2012	As One featuring Donghae	Non-album single	Co-writer
"My Everything"	2013	Mr.Mr.	Waiting For You	Co-composer
"Butterflies"	2013	Piggy Dolls	Non-album single	Writer
"Special Love"	2013	Wheesung and Gummy	Non-album single	Co-composer
"Perfect Christmas"	2013	Jo Kwon, Lim Jeong-hee, Joo Hee, Rap Monster, and Jungkook	Non-album single	Co-writer
"Some"	2014	Soyou and Junggigo featuring Lil Boi	Non-album single	Co-writer
"Hello"	2014	Mamamoo	Hello	Lyricist, co-composer
"Heeheehaheho"	2014	Mamamoo and Geeks	Hello	Co-writer
"Peppermint Chocolate" (썸남썸녀)	2014	Mamamoo and K.Will featuring Wheesung	Hello	Co-composer
"Don't Be Happy" (행복하지마)	2014	Mamamoo and Bumkey	Hello	Writer
"I'll Teach You" (알려줄게)	2014	4Minute	4Minute World	Lyricist, co-composer
"Without You" (견딜만해)	2014	Mad Clown featuring Hyolyn	Pyodok (표독)	Co-writer
"Dance"	2014	Jo Kwon	Let's Talk	Co-writer
"Piano Man"	2014	Mamamoo	Piano Man	Co-composer
"Thief"	2015	Bastarz	Zero For Conduct	Co-writer
"Oh You Yeah You" (오유야유)	2015	Yoo Sung-eun	Twenty Again OST	Writer
"Crosswalk"	2016	Jo Kwon	Non-album single	Co-composer
"Words Don't Come Easy" (우리끼리)	2016	Mamamoo	Melting	Co-lyricist
