= Memory (EP) =

2016 EP by Mamamoo

EP by Mamamoo
- Released: November 7, 2016
- Genre: K-pop; dance; R&B
- Length: 28:31
- Language: Korean
- Label: RBW

Mamamoo chronology
Melting (2016)	Memory (2016)	Purple (2017)

Singles from Memory
- 1. "New York" Released: September 21, 2016; 2. "Décalcomanie" Released: November 9, 2016

Music video
- "Décalcomanie" on YouTube

Memory is the fourth extended play by South Korean girl group Mamamoo. It was released by RBW on November 7, 2016 and distributed by CJ E&M Music. It contains eight songs, including the singles "New York" and "Décalcomanie", the soundtrack single "Woo Hoo" from LG G5 And Friends OST, and the sub-unit tracks "Dab Dab" and "Angel".

== Release and chart performance ==
On October 26, 2016, Mamamoo announced that a new album would be released in the next month. They began teasing the album from October 27, by posting member teaser images, music video teasers, secret codes and the unveiling of the official track list. Two sub-unit performances and a pre-release single were released prior to this to build anticipation for the group's upcoming return. The first sub-unit song "Dab Dab" performed by the group's rap line (Moonbyul and Hwasa) charted at number 69, while the second sub-unit song "Angel" performed by the group's vocal line (Solar and Wheein) charted higher at number 26. The first single from the album, "New York", was released on September 21, the song both entered and peaked at number 9 on the Gaon Digital Chart. The full album was accompanied by two music videos, one being for the title track were released on November 7.

== Composition and promotion ==
Mamamoo produced Memory with Kim Do-Hoon, an executive of Rainbow Bridge World who led them to their current success.

== Track listing ==
No.	Title	Lyrics	Music	Arrangement	Length
1.	"Memory" (그리고 그리고 그려봐; geuligo geuligo geulyeobwa; lit. Draw & Draw & Draw)	Solar; Moonbyul; Kim Do-hoon	Kim Do-hoon	Shinmin	3:52
2.	"Décalcomanie" (데칼코마니)	Solar; Moonbyul; Hwasa; Kim Do-hoon	Kim Do-hoon	Kim Do-hoon; MGR; Park Woo-sang	3:36
3.	"New York"	Moonbyul; Park Woo-sang	Park Woo-sang	Park Woo-sang	3:02
4.	"Moderato" (sung by Wheein feat. Hash Swan)	Wheein; Park Woo-sang; Hash Swan	Wheein; Park Woo-sang	Park Woo-sang	3:59
5.	"Angel" (sung by Solar & Wheein)	Park Woo-sang	Park Woo-sang	Park Woo-sang	3:33
6.	"Dab Dab" (sung by Hwasa & Moonbyul)	Park Woo-sang; Kim Ma-cho	Park Woo-sang; Kim Ma-cho	Park Woo-sang; Kim Ma-cho	2:50
7.	"I Love Too" (놓지 않을게)	Moonbyul; Solar; Hwasa	Kim Do-hoon	Choi Yong-chan	4:25
8.	"Woo Hoo" (기대해도 좋은 날)	Cosmic Sound; Cosmic Girl; Jang Yoon-seo; Park Woo-sang	Cosmic Sound; Cosmic Girl	Cosmic Sound; Cosmic Girl	3:14
Total length:					28:31

== Charts ==
=== Weekly charts ===
Chart (2016)	Peak position
South Korean Albums (Gaon)	3
US World Albums (Billboard)	12

=== Monthly charts ===
Chart (2016)	Peak position
South Korean Albums (Gaon)	9

=== Year-end charts ===
Chart (2016)	Position
South Korean Albums (Gaon)	62

== Accolades ==
"Decalcomanie" on select listicles
Critic/publication	Year	List	Rank	Ref.
Rolling Stone	2023	The 100 Greatest Songs in the History of Korean Pop Music	87	

== Awards ==
=== Music programs ===
Song	Program	Date
"Decalcomanie"	The Show	November 29, 2016
