= Piano Man (EP) =

EP by Mamamoo
- Released: November 21, 2014
- Genres: K-pop; dance
- Length: 13:27
- Language: Korean
- Label: WA Entertainment
- Producer: Kim Do-hoon

Mamamoo chronology
Hello (2014)	Piano Man (2014)	Pink Funky (2015)

Singles from Piano Man
- 1. "Piano Man" Released: November 21, 2014

Piano Man is the second extended play by South Korean girl group Mamamoo. It was released by WA Entertainment on November 21, 2014 and distributed by CJ E&M Music. It contains two songs—the single of the same name and "Gentleman", a collaboration with Esna. Musically, the album is retro-inspired and the title track was described as an electronic swing dance song.

== Release and chart performance ==
On November 5, 2014, Mamamoo announced that a new album would be released later in the month. Their second EP, Piano Man, was originally scheduled for release on November 20, but the release was delayed by one day because the music video was not ready in time. The digital album and accompanying music video were released on November 21, and the CD version was released on December 1. The album entered the Gaon Album Chart at number eight in the first week of December, and sold 1,701 units during the month. The title track entered the Gaon Digital Chart at number 87, and peaked at number 41 the following week. The album re-entered the Gaon Album Chart at number 17 in November 2015 after Mamamoo gained public attention with their win on Immortal Songs: Singing the Legend.

== Composition and promotion ==
Both songs on the album were written by Kim Eana and composed by Kim Do-hoon and Esna. "Piano Man" is a retro-inspired electronic swing dance song with a rhythmic piano melody and brass instrumentation. Lyrically, it is about a woman falling in love at first sight with the "piano man". "Gentleman" is also retro-inspired with brass instrumentation, and is about a group of female friends meeting at a café to discuss their ideal men. The album also includes a piano version and instrumental of "Piano Man".

The music video for "Piano Man" was directed by BoA's brother Kwon Soon-wook of video production company Metaoloz. It has a retro style reminiscent of the 1960s and 1970s, and is mostly in black-and-white, with color used for emphasis. It takes place in a jazz bar and features B1A4's Gongchan, wearing a trench coat and fedora, as the "piano man". The Mamamoo members play a singer, bartender, businesswoman, and dancer who are all trying to seduce the pianist. The song was choreographed by the group, and the dance scenes were filmed on a brick street.

Mamamoo promoted the album with performances of "Piano Man" on various music TV shows. The song was first performed on SBS MTV's The Show on November 18, three days before the album's release date. They performed a remix version on several year-end specials, including on Music Bank and Show! Music Core. They also performed the song at the Gaon Chart K-Pop Awards in January 2015, where they were awarded New Female Artist of the Year.

== Track listing ==
No.	Title	Lyrics	Music	Arrangement	Length
1.	"Piano Man"	Kim Eana; Moonbyul	Esna; Kim Do-hoon	Kim Do-hoon	3:15
2.	"Gentleman" (featuring Esna)	Kim Eana; Moonbyul	Esna; Kim Do-hoon	Lee Sang Ho	3:40
3.	"Love Lane" (CD Only)	Sora; Park Woo-sang	Park Woo-sang	Park Woo-sang	3:21
4.	"Piano Man" (Piano version)		Esna; Kim Do-hoon	Kim Do-hoon	3:15
5.	"Piano Man" (Instrumental)		Esna; Kim Do-hoon	Kim Do-hoon	3:17
Total length:					13:27

== Charts ==
Chart (2014)	Peak position
South Korean Albums (Gaon)	8
