= Geeks (musical duo) =

South Korean hip hop duo

Geeks 긱스
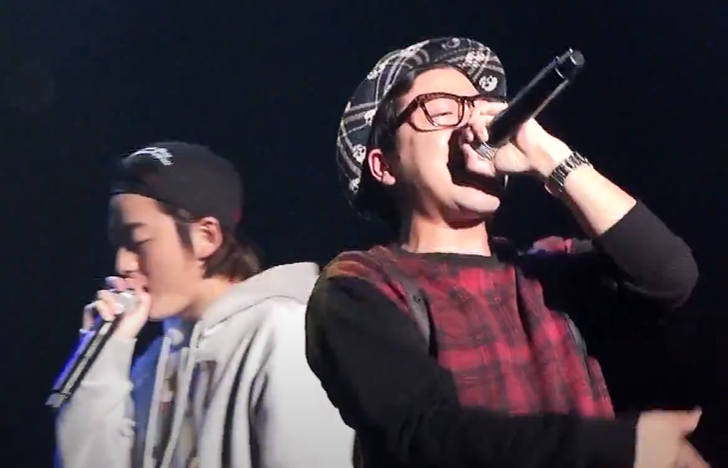
- Geeks in 2013

Background information
- Origin: Seoul, South Korea
- Genre: Hip hop
- Years active: 2011–present
- Labels: Grandline Entertainment, Rainbow Bridge World
- Members: Lil Boi; Louie

Geeks (Korean: 긱스) is a South Korean hip hop duo composed of rappers Lil Boi and Louie. They are signed under Grandline Entertainment and Rainbow Bridge World. They are both credited lyricists, composers, and producers, as well as notable Korean rappers in their own right. They hit mainstream crossover success in a collaboration with Sistar's Soyou in the track "Officially Missing You Too," a major K-pop hit of 2012.

== Broadcasting ==
LilBoi starred in Show Me The Money 4 and was attracted by many producers including Jay Park, president of "AOMG". He entered the AOMG in team selection and sang "Respect" with Geegooin and SIK-K and called "On It + Bo $$" with Jay Park, Loco and got very popular. On the other hand, he called "on it + bo $$" and dropped to MINO with a difference of 5 votes.

== Career ==
=== Breakout Debut Success in 2011 ===
Geeks debuted with their mini-album "Officially Missing You" on March 9. The title song "Officially Missing You" is a remake of an R&B hit by Canadian singer Tamia. Geeks placed first on Cyworld's daily music chart with that song. Geeks participated in the 3rd Grand Line Show, a hiphop concert, and in the TV show "GEEKS TV." They were also the "Rookie of the Month" for May for the Cyworld Digital Music Awards.

=== Collaborative Success in 2012 ===
Geeks released their second mini-album "Hang Over" with a title song of the same name and an accompanying music video on April 13. They held a collaborative concert with Crucial Star on May 26. Geeks also performed at 'Green Groove Festival 2012." Geeks were featured in Jung Hye Min's title song "Don't Call Me Nuna", released October 18.

Sistar's Soyou released a successful collaboration track named "Officially Missing You Too" on November 1, 2012. The song ranked number one on several Korean music sites. The track and its accompanying collaboration album and music video were both part of a project called "Re:code" supervised and produced by Loen Entertainment to take quality tracks from underground Korean hiphop artists and arrange them to be more mainstream. Geeks thus scored their first top ten hit with "Officially Missing You Too."

In December Geeks signed a contract with Kim Do Hoon(김도) of Rainbow Bridge World (formerly WA Entertainment).

=== First Full Length Album in 2013 ===
Geeks promoted the song "How Are You?" on Korean music shows in April. The track hit seventh place on the weekly K-pop music charts. Geeks released their first full album "Geeks Vol. 1-Backpack: Lights On" that same week. On April 28, Geeks released Backpack's title song "Wash Away"'s music video featuring Ailee. A music video of the hiphop track "Siren" featuring Swings was released to coincide with the album release as well. Geeks also performed at labelmates Phantom's first solo concert on May 17.

Geeks released a single named "Fly" and its music video on July 10. The music video chronicles Geeks' impromptu June "guerrilla" concerts. Geeks again hit seventh place on the Gaon Weekly Chart for the fourth week of July. Geeks held their first solo concert, "Lights On" on August 17. The concert featured Ailee and singer IU.

Geeks were featured in Navi(나비)'s title track "I Ain't Going Home Tonight," released September 5. The duo were also featured in singer A.T.'s track "Don't Be" and its music video. Geeks performed at MU:CON Seoul 2013, a global music industry convention. Geeks and Phantom travelled to Indonesia as Korea's representatives for "Vaganza on November" and performed there on November 24.

== Discography ==
=== Studio albums ===
| Title | Album details | Peak chart positions | Sales |
| Title | Album details | KOR | Sales |
|---|---|---|---|
| Backpack | Released: How Entertainment, Grandline Entertainment; Label: April 29, 2013; Formats: CD, digital download | 8 | KOR: 3,091 |
| Fireworks | Released: July 18, 2017; Label: How Entertainment, Grandline Entertainment; Formats: CD, digital download | 34 | —N/a |

=== Extended plays ===
| Title | Album details | Peak chart positions | Sales |
| Title | Album details | KOR | Sales |
|---|---|---|---|
| Officially Missing You | Released: March 9, 2011; Label: Danal Entertainment; Formats: CD, digital download | — | —N/a |
| Hangover | Released: April 13, 2012; Label: Grandline Entertainment; Formats: CD, digital download | 33 | KOR: 616 |
| Hangover | Re-released: June 25, 2012 (as 2nd Mini Album Repackage); Label: Grandline Entertainment; Formats: CD, digital download | 36 | KOR: 616 |

=== Singles ===
| Title | Year | Peak chart positions | Sales (DL) | Album |
| Title | Year | KOR | Sales (DL) | Album |
|---|---|---|---|---|
| "Officially Missing You" | 2011 | 56 | KOR: 2,500,000+ | Officially Missing You |
| "Just Go" (그냥 가요) feat. Jo Hyun-ah | 2012 | 35 | KOR: 230,535 | Hangover |
| "In The Morning" (아침에) | 2012 | 91 | KOR: 74,316 | Hangover |
| "Hold It Down" | 2012 | 70 | KOR: 57,916 | 2nd Mini Album Repackage |
| "How Are You" (어때) feat. Hareem | 2013 | 3 | KOR: 979,263 | Backpack |
| "Wash Away" feat. Ailee | 2013 | 4 | KOR: 998,423 | Backpack |
| "Fly" | 2013 | 6 | KOR: 467,486 | Non-album singles |
| "We Are" (우리는) feat. Crybaby, DJ Dopsh | 2013 | 27 | KOR: 126,024 | Non-album singles |
| "F.I.L.A (Fall In Love Again)" feat. DJ Dopsh | 2014 | 36 | KOR: 89,557 | Non-album singles |
| "Is You" feat. Park Jung-hyun | 2015 | 9 | KOR: 187,617 | Non-album singles |
| "Divin" | 2016 | 41 | KOR: 59,036 | Fireworks |
| "Sometimes" (가끔) feat. Crush, Giriboy | 2016 | 2 | KOR: 310,923 | Fireworks |
| "Woo" | 2017 | — | KOR: 20,343 | Fireworks |
| "Fireworks" feat. Han Sang-won | 2017 | — | —N/a | Fireworks |
"—" denotes releases that did not chart.

=== Collaborations ===
| Year | Title | Other artist(s) |
|---|---|---|
| 2012 | "Together Forever" (머무르다) | Jo Hyun-ah |
| 2012 | "Officially missing you, too" | Soyou |
| 2013 | "Brilliant is" | Skull, Haha, Zico, Mad Clown, Swings, Double K, Zizo, Soul Dive, Heo Kyung-hwan, Kim Ji-min |
| 2013 | "Mistletoe" (미슬토우) | Phantom, Esna |
| 2014 | "Heeheehaheho" (히히하헤호) | Mamamoo |
| 2014 | "Let's Just Be Friends" (친구로 남아줄게) | Wheesung |

== Awards and nominations ==
| Year | Recipient | Award/Critics | Category | Result | Reference |
|---|---|---|---|---|---|
| 2013 | "Washing Away" | Mnet Asian Music Awards | Song of the Year | Nominated | |
| 2013 | "Washing Away" | Mnet Asian Music Awards | Best Rap Performance | Nominated | |
| 2013 | "Washing Away" | MelOn Music Awards | Rap/Hip Hop Award | Nominated | |
| 2013 | "Washing Away" | Mnet 20's Choice Awards | 20's Hot Rapper | Nominated | |
