= Purple (EP) =

- Digital cover

EP by Mamamoo
- Released: June 22, 2017
- Recorded: 2017
- Studio: RBW Studio
- Genre: K-pop; dance; R&B
- Length: 17:20
- Language: Korean
- Label: RBW

Mamamoo chronology
Memory (2016)	Purple (2017)	Yellow Flower (2018)

Singles from Purple
- 1. "Yes I Am" Released: June 22, 2017

Music video
- "Yes I Am" on YouTube

Purple is the fifth extended play by South Korean girl group Mamamoo. It was released by RBW on June 22, 2017, and distributed by CJ E&M Music. It contains five songs, including the single "Yes I Am".

== Release ==
The EP was released on June 22, 2017, through several music portals, including Melon, and iTunes for the global market.

== Single ==
"Yes I Am" was released as the lead single in conjunction with the EP on June 22.

== Track listing ==
No.	Title	Lyrics	Music	Arrangement	Length
1.	"Yes I Am" (나로 말할 것 같으면; Naro Malhal Geot Gateumyeon; lit: If I Were to Describe Myself)	Kim Do-hoon; Solar; Moonbyul; Hwasa	Kim Do-hoon	Kim Do-hoon	3:31
2.	"Finally"	Cosmic Sound; Cosmic Girl; Moonbyul	Cosmic Sound; Cosmic Girl	Cosmic Sound; Cosmic Girl	3:08
3.	"Love & Hate" (구차해; Guchahae; lit: It's Pathetic) (Moonbyul solo)	Moonbyul; Park Woo-sang	Park Woo-sang	Park Woo-sang	3:13
4.	"Aze Gag" (아재개그) (narr. Kim Dae-hee & Kim Joon-ho)	Kim Do-hoon; Solar; Moonbyul; Hwasa	Kim Do-hoon; Solar; Hwasa	Kim Do-hoon	3:31
5.	"Da Ra Da" (다라다) (sung by Wheein, Jeff Bernat, B.O.)	B.O.	파이어뱃; B.O.	파이어뱃	3:57
Total length:					17:25

== Charts ==
=== Weekly charts ===
Chart (2017)	Peak position
South Korean Albums (Gaon)	2
US World Albums (Billboard)	1

=== Monthly charts ===
Chart (2017)	Peak position
South Korean Albums (Gaon)	5

=== Year-end charts ===
Chart (2017)	Position
South Korean Albums (Gaon)	65

== Awards ==
Year	Awards	Category	Recipient
2018	Seoul Music Awards	TikTok Dance Performance	"Yes I Am"

=== Music program awards ===
Song	Program	Date
"Yes I Am"	The Show	June 27, 2017
"Yes I Am"	Show Champion	June 28, 2017
"Yes I Am"	M Countdown	June 29, 2017
"Yes I Am"	M Countdown	July 6, 2017
"Yes I Am"	M Countdown	July 13, 2017
"Yes I Am"	Music Bank	July 17, 2017
"Yes I Am"	Show! Music Core	July 1, 2017
