= Moonbyul =

South Korean rapper and singer (born 1992)

- Moonbyul in 2026
- Born: Moon Byul-yi; December 22, 1992 (age 33); Bucheon, South Korea
- Occupations: Rapper; singer; songwriter
- Musical career
- Genres: K-pop; Jazz; R&B
- Instrument: Vocals
- Years active: 2014–present
- Label: RBW
- Member of: Mamamoo; Mamamoo+
- Formerly of: Girls Next Door

Korean name
- Hangul: 문별이
- RR: Mun Byeoli
- MR: Mun Pyŏri

Stage name
- Hangul: 문별
- RR: Munbyeol
- MR: Munbyŏl

Signature
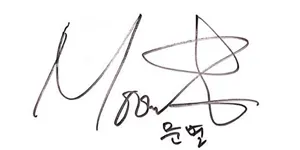

Moon Byul-yi (Korean: 문별이, born December 22, 1992), known professionally as Moonbyul (문별; stylized as Moon Byul), is a South Korean rapper, singer and songwriter under RBW Entertainment. She is a member of the South Korean girl group Mamamoo and its sub-unit Mamamoo+.

Moonbyul made her solo debut in May 2018 with the digital single Selfish. According to the Korea Music Copyright Association, she has songwriting credits on over 100 songs.

== Early life and education ==
Moon Byul-yi was born on December 22, 1992, in Bucheon, South Korea. In 2011, she was accepted into the Paekche Institute of the Arts, where she studied media music and vocals. During her middle school years, she became interested in singing after watching TVXQ's performance of "Rising Sun". She decided to pursue singing after receiving positive feedback during a school performance. She also cited Girls' Generation and their leader Taeyeon as early influences on her career aspirations, and attended SM Entertainment's academy in an attempt to follow in her footsteps. She graduated from Wonmi High School, and later from the Paekche Institute of the Arts majoring in media, music and vocals.

== Name ==
Moonbyul's stage name combines her family name "Moon" with her given name "Byul-yi". Her given name "Byul-yi" means star in Korean. According to Moonbyul, she has stated that her father chose the name "Byul-yi", meaning star, inspired by the night of her birth.

She uses the alias "Moonstar" as her rap name, which directly translates the meaning of her Korean name into English. Since her debut, she has incorporated the alias "Moonstar" in several of her lyrics, including in collaborations with other artists. The motifs of the moon and stars are often associated with her as well.

== Career ==
=== Debut with Mamamoo ===
Moonbyul debuted as the main rapper and performer of Mamamoo on June 18, 2014, with the single "Mr.Ambiguous."The group became known for their vocal-centered musical style, according to Korean media outlets.

She joined her label RBW in 2011. Despite originally passing her audition as a vocalist and training as one, it was suggested to her by their record producer that she switch to becoming a rapper, as the group needed a rapper. Although she was rather unfamiliar with the genre and was only informed six months prior, she debuted with Mamamoo on June 19, 2014. According to the group's WAW documentary, Moonbyul also specialized in freestyle dance and hip-hop, and would show up to monthly evaluations with self-made routines she choreographed herself.

=== 2014–2017: Mamamoo ===
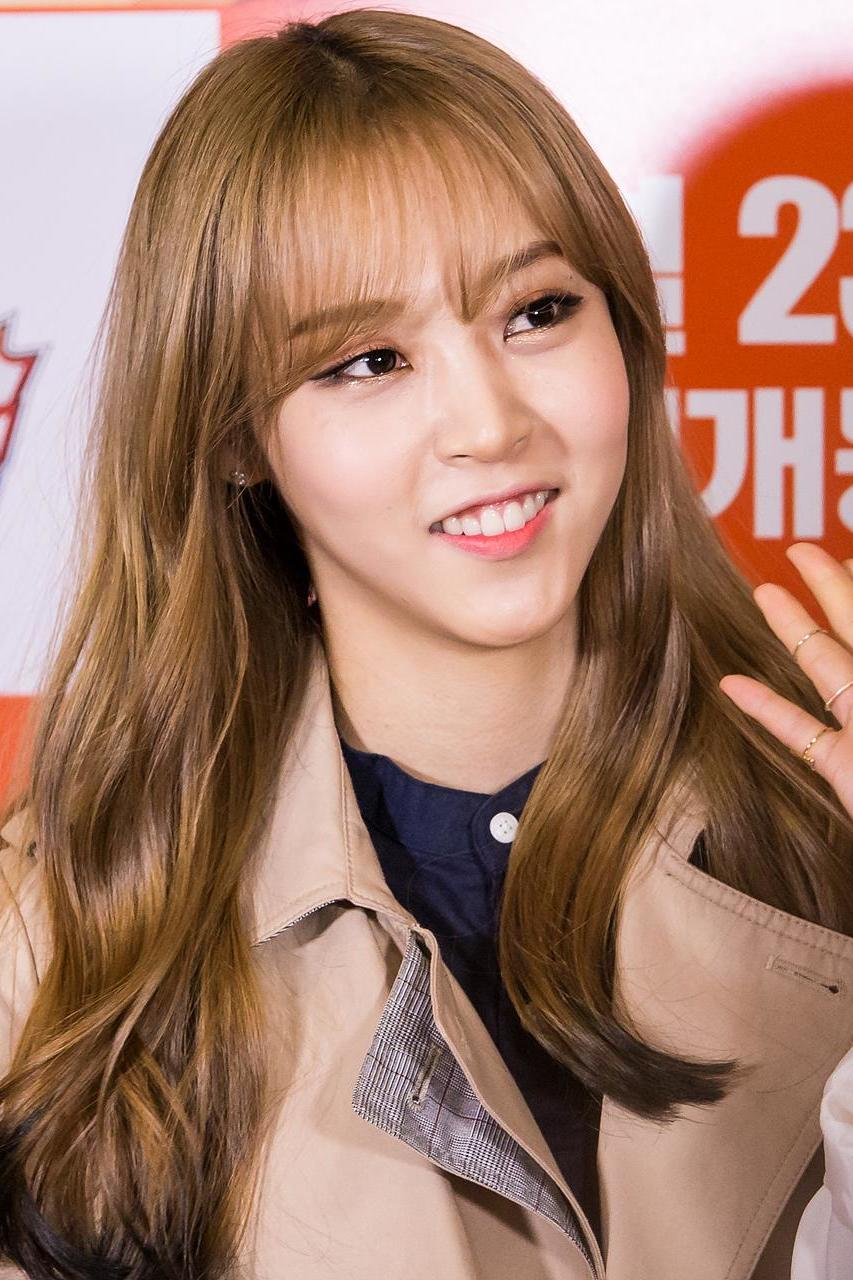
Moonbyul in 2015

Moonbyul debuted as a member of the girl group Mamamoo on June 19, 2014, with the release of their first extended play (EP) Hello. As one of the members in charge of performance, she contributed to the choreography of the group's debut track, the lead single "Mr. Ambiguous".

Since the release of their second extended play Piano Man in November 2014, Moonbyul has co-written many of the group's lead singles, including the entirety of her own raps.

In November 2016, Mamamoo performed at the 37th annual Blue Dragon Film Awards, one of the most prestigious film awards in South Korean entertainment industry. They put a creative twist on their song "Decalcomanie" by including adlibs that referenced famous quotes and well-known lines from popular movies that year. In particular, Moonbyul's line "Jung Woo-sung, if I drink this in one shot, will you go out with me?", the moment received attention online and was widely shared on social media, contributing to the song's chart performance, along with his reaction that was captured on screen. The moment went viral in South Korea, garnering 1.5 million views within a day. The group and their song "Decalcomanie" gained a surge in popularity and rose to the top of real-time music charts, becoming a hit domestically.

In June 2017, Moonbyul released her first solo track, "Love & Hate", as part of Mamamoo's fifth EP, Purple. She wrote the song based on her own past relationship, conveying the heartbreak of feeling alone even while the other person was there. Her interpretation of the bittersweetness of first love, is reflected in her dancing in the performance video as well.

=== 2018–2020: Solo Activities ===
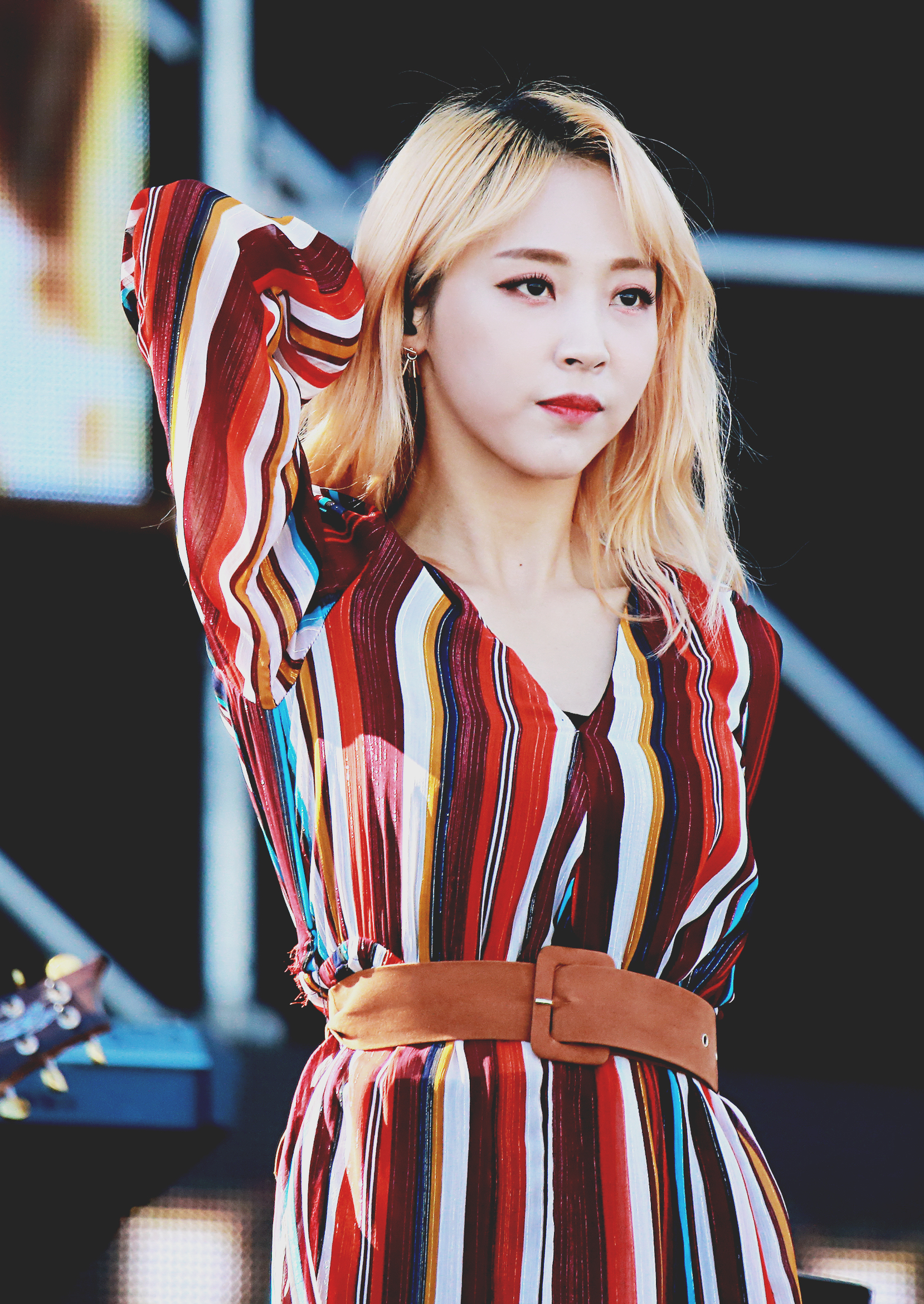
Moonbyul performing at a festival in 2018

In May 2018, Moonbyul made her solo debut with the digital single "Selfish," featuring Seulgi of Red Velvet.

She released her first EP, Dark Side of the Moon, on February 14, 2020. Rolling Stone described the album as "surprisingly expansive in the genres it explores", experimenting with a range of genres including jazz, blues, ballads and hip-hop, while the lead single "Eclipse" is described as a "powerful blend of rock, synth and trap". Billboard commended the release for continuing Mamamoo's legacy of relaying different ideas of feminine strength through their music, adding praise to Moonbyul for being "Billboard noted her use of diverse genres and performance styles". Upon release, the album charted at number one on the iTunes Top Album Chart in four countries, and ranked within the Top 5 in ten regions worldwide. Its lead single "Eclipse" also peaked at number fourteen on Billboard World Digital Song Sales chart for the week of February 14, 2020. Dark Side of the Moon sold 66,000 copies in the first week of its release alone and the album reportedly sold 66,000 copies in its first week, placing high on the Gaon Chart.

=== 2020–2021: Venturing beyond music and successful hosting debut ===
In July 2020, Moonbyul was appointed as a host for the weekly radio program Avengirls on Naver NOW. Upon garnering high broadcast ratings, she launched Studio Moon Night, her own flagship talk show, on February 15, 2021. With this live broadcast program that aired thrice weekly with new guests appearing each episode, she became the first Mamamoo member to venture into hosting and having a program named after her. She also composed and wrote the theme song for the show herself.

Studio Moon Night was renewed for a second season in March 2022 after marking its first anniversary of being on air. In May of the same year, Moonbyul was awarded at 2022 Korea Brand Customer Loyalty Index for her work as a host in the live broadcasting category. The Brand Customer Loyalty Awards is held annually by the Korean Consumers Council to recognize the brands and personalities that have the most influence on popular culture and society, as determined through consumer research in association with the U.S. consulting firm Brand Keys.

In October 2021, she joined the cast of SBS entertainment program Kick a Goal. Moonbyul scored her first ever goal on the August 24th, 2022 episode to help her team FC Top Girl advance to the Super League, which recorded the high viewership ratings of 9.6% per minute.

On December 20, 2021, Moonbyul launched her YouTube channel, "moonbyul2da". (Note: The channel name is read as "Moon Byul-yi da" which literally means "it's Moonbyul" – it is a pun on her birth name and the Korean pronunciation of the number two (yi) as it is a recurring number in her birth date (1992-12-22) and is a special number to her.) In the lead-up to her third EP, Moonbyul pre-released two tracks; the single "G999", featuring fellow rapper Mirani, on December 13, 2021, and single "Shutdown", featuring Seori, on December 30, 2021.

=== 2022: 6equence, solo concerts, and C.I.T.T (Cheese in the Trap) ===
On January 19, 2022, Moonbyul released her third EP, 6equence. The album depicts a chronological sequence of six scenes of a romantic relationship from meeting to parting through its six tracks, reaching the climax of obsession with house-based title track "Lunatic", and is designed to be enjoyed "as if watching a short film". Moonbyul stated in the run-up to 6equence's release that she hopes to challenge the binary view of gender through her music, reflected in her androgynous musical style and gender-neutral lyrics. From March 5–6, 2022, Moonbyul held her second solo concerts Director's Cut: 6equence over two days.

On April 28, 2022, she released her fifth EP, C.I.T.T (Cheese in the Trap), containing punk rock lead single of the same name, as well as acoustic R&B track "My Moon", self-composed by Moonbyul as a song for her fans. The Album's sales of C.I.T.T (Cheese in the Trap) surpass 100,000 records sold with a single album.

Moonbyul held two shows from her first overseas solo concert Director's Cut: Japan Special Live in Osaka, Japan on August 20, 2022.

From August to November 2022, Moonbyul participated in and won the JTBC survival program The Second World, a competition where rappers from K-pop girl groups engaged in a vocal performance contest. In the first round, she performed her own arrangement of Day6's Congratulations, receiving a score of 2,000 points and ranking first. She secures top scores in multiple rounds. She ultimately won first place in the finale, and the phrase "어우문" (an acronym meaning "Moonbyul is going to win anyway") gained popularity in reference to her strong performance during the show.

On December 22, 2022, Moonbyul released the special single album The Present, featuring the lead single Present, described as a funk-based R&B track. The album marked her sixth solo release and included songs such as A Miracle 3 Days Ago and Chemistry.

=== 2023–present: First studio album and solo world tour ===
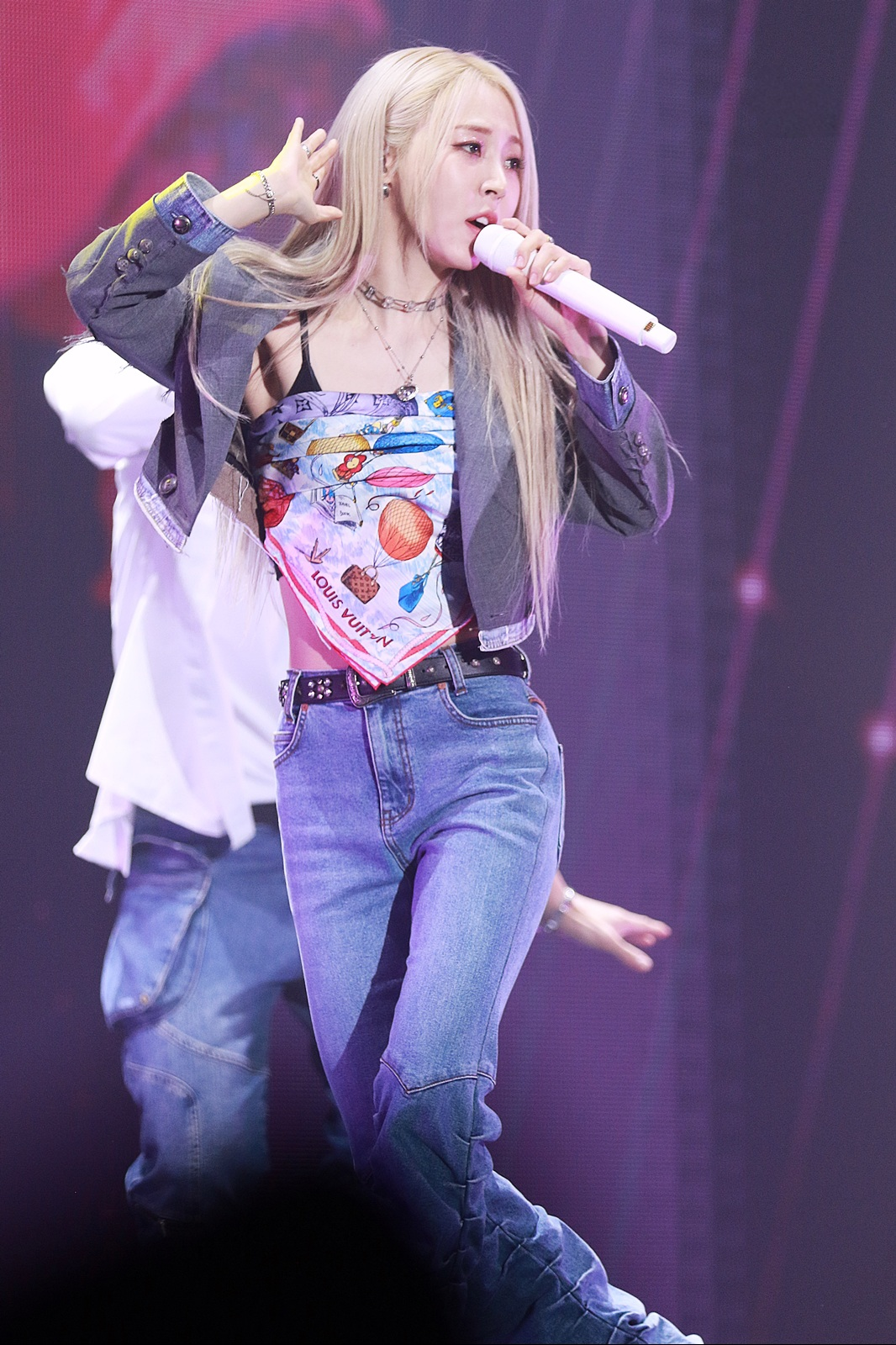
Moonbyul performing at 'MUSEUM: An Epic of Starlit' world tour.

On January 7, 2023, Moonbyul performed at the 37th Golden Disc Awards, following her victory in the competition show The Second World, performing her songs "On My Way" and "Comma". Moonbyul joined the judging panel of JTBC's boy group survival program Peak Time in February 2023, replacing Mino of Winner. On April 29, Moonbyul was invited to perform at the Japanese edition of the Chimac Festival, held at the Expo Commemoration Park in Osaka, Japan. This marked her debut appearance as a solo artist in a music festival.

On February 20, 2024, Moonbyul released her first studio album Starlit of Muse, featuring the lead singles "Touchin&Movin" and "Think About". The album sold over 100,000 copies in its first week, according to [Gaon/Hanteo]. The 12-track album reached first place on the iTunes Top Albums Chart in ten different regions and sold over 100,000 copies in its first week. Moonbyul embarked on her first solo world tour, Museum: An Epic of Starlit with shows in Seoul, Taipei, Singapore, Hong Kong, Kaohsiung, Osaka, Tokyo and Macau.

== Philanthropy ==
In addition to her artistic endeavours, Moonbyul has been involved in various charitable activities, she has participated in several charitable activities.

== Discography ==
=== Studio albums ===
Title	Details	Peak chart positions	Sales
Title	Details	KOR	Sales
Starlit of Muse	Released: February 20, 2024; Label: RBW; Formats: CD, digital download, streaming; Track listing: 1. "Intro: WWUD (What Would You Do?)"; 2. "Think About"; 3. "Touchin&Movin"; 4. "Like a Fool"; 5. "Attention Seeker"; 6. "Nolto" (feat. Hanhae); 7. "After Sunset" (그런 밤); 8. "Timeline"; 9. "Dark Romance"; 10. "Gold"; 11. "Memories" (feat. Onewe); 12. "Without" (겁이나)	5	KOR: 119,871

=== Extended plays ===
Title	Details	Peak chart positions	Sales
Title	Details	KOR	Sales
Dark Side of the Moon	Released: February 14, 2020; Label: RBW; Formats: CD, digital download, streaming; Track listing: 1. "Eclipse" (달이 태양을 가릴 때); 2. "Mirror"; 3. "Iljido"; 4. "Moon Movie"; 5. "Weird Day" (낯선 날) (feat. Punch); 6. "Snow" (눈)	2	KOR: 77,201
6equence	Released: January 19, 2022; Label: RBW; Formats: CD, digital download, streaming; Track listing: 1. "Intro: Synopsis"; 2. "G999" (feat. Mirani); 3. "Shutdown" (머리에서 발끝까지) (feat. Seori); 4. "Lunatic"; 5. "For Me" (너만 들었으면 좋겠다); 6. "Ddu Ddu Ddu" (내가 뭘 어쩌겠니?); 7. "Lunatic" (English ver.)	5	KOR: 88,607
Laundri	Released: August 20, 2025; Label: RBW; Formats: CD, digital download, streaming; Track listing: 1. "Cotton"; 2. "Goodbyes and Sad Eyes"; 3. "Da Capo"; 4. "Chocolate Tea"; 5. "Drip"; 6. "Over You"; 7. "Icy Bby"; 8. "Take-off"	5	KOR: 79,029

=== Reissues ===
Title	Details	Peak chart positions	Sales
Title	Details	KOR	Sales
門OON	Released: May 29, 2020; Label: RBW; Formats: Kihno, digital download, streaming; Track listing: 1. "Intro: Satellite" (Intro : 우린 어느 별에서 떨어져 둘이 됐을까?); 2. "Eclipse" (달이 태양을 가릴 때); 3. "Mirror"; 4. "Iljido"; 5. "Moon Movie"; 6. "Weird Day" (낯선 날) (feat. Punch); 7. "Snow" (눈); 8. "Absence" (부재); 9. "Absence" (부재) (Inst.)	7	KOR: 36,929
Starlit of Twinkle	Released: August 21, 2024; Label: RBW; Formats: LP, digital download, streaming audio	17	KOR: 9,837

=== Single albums ===
Title	Details	Peak chart positions		Sales
Title	Details	KOR	JPN	Sales
Selfish	Released: May 23, 2018; Label: RBW; Formats: Kihno, digital download, streaming; Track listing: 1. "In My Room"; 2. "Selfish" (feat. Seulgi); 3. "Love & Hate" (구차해) (Acoustic ver.)	—	—	—N/a
C.I.T.T (Cheese in the Trap)	Released: April 28, 2022; Label: RBW; Formats: CD, digital download, streaming; Track listing: 1. "C.I.T.T (Cheese in the Trap)"; 2. "My Moon" (반달)	2	—	KOR: 110,728
The Present	Released: December 22, 2022; Label: RBW; Formats: CD, digital download, streaming; Track listing: 1. "A Miracle 3Days Ago"; 2. "Chemistry"; 3. "Present"	4	—	KOR: 33,409
Aurora	Released: February 5, 2025; Label: RBW; Formats: CD, digital download, streaming; Track listing: 1. "Hoshiakari" (ほしあかり); 2. "Because of You"; 3. "Is This Love?" (Japanese Ver.)	—	7	JPN: 5,330
Rev	Released: March 25, 2026; Label: RBW; Formats: CD, digital download, streaming; Track listing: 1. "Hertz"; 2. "Dreamer"; 3. "Momentum"	13	—	KOR: 25,281
"—" denotes releases that did not chart or were not released in that region.

=== Singles ===
==== As lead artist ====
Title	Year	Peak chart positions				Album
Title	Year	KOR	KOR Billb.	JPN	US World	Album
"Selfish" (feat. Seulgi)	2018	84	82	—	—	Selfish and Red Moon
"Weird Day" (낯선 날) (feat. Punch)	2020	96	69	—	—	Dark Side of the Moon
"Eclipse" (달이 태양을 가릴 때)	2020	140	84	—	14	Dark Side of the Moon
"Absence" (부재)	2020	— (Note: "Absence" did not enter the Gaon Digital Chart, but peaked at number 62 on the Gaon Download Chart)	—	—	12	門OON
"G999" (feat. Mirani)	2021	— (Note: "G999" did not enter the Gaon Digital Chart, but peaked at number 28 on the Gaon Download Chart)	—	—	—	6equence
"Shutdown" (머리에서 발끝까지) (feat. Seori)	2021	— (Note: "Shutdown" did not enter the Gaon Digital Chart, but peaked at number 38 on the Gaon Download Chart)	—	—	—	6equence
"Lunatic"	2022	— (Note: "Lunatic" did not enter the Gaon Digital Chart, but peaked at number 13 on the Gaon Download Chart.)	—	—	—	6equence
"Trying to Say Good-Bye" (서툰 이별을 하려해)	2022	144	—	—	—	Non-album single
"C.I.T.T (Cheese in the Trap)"	2022	— (Note: "C.I.T.T (Cheese in the Trap)" did not enter the Gaon Digital Chart, but peaked at number 25 on the Gaon Download Chart.)	—	—	—	C.I.T.T (Cheese in the Trap)
"Touchin&Movin"	2024	— (Note: "Touchin&Movin" did not enter the Circle Digital Chart, but peaked at number 19 on the Circle Download Chart.)	—	—	—	Starlit of Muse
"Think About"	2024	— (Note: "Think About" did not enter the Circle Digital Chart, but peaked at number 34 on the Circle Download Chart.)	—	—	—	Starlit of Muse
"Is This Love?" (내 친구의 친구 얘기인데)	2024	—	—	—	—	Starlit of Twinkle
"Hoshiakari" (ほしあかり)	2025	—	—	7	—	Aurora
"Icy Bby"	2025	—	—	—	—	Laundri
"Good Byes And Sad Eyes"	2025	—	—	—	—	Laundri
"S.O.S"	2025	—	—	—	—	Non-album single
"Hertz"	2026	—	—	—	—	Rev
"—" denotes releases that did not chart.

==== Collaborations ====
Title	Year	Peak chart positions	Sales	Album
Title	Year	KOR	Sales	Album
"Dab Dab" (with Hwasa)	2016	69	KOR: 31,040	Memory
"Promise U" (Note: remake version of VIBE's 'Promise U' to celebrate VIBE's 20th Anniversary.) (with Solar)	2021	172	—N/a	REVIBE Vol.1
"Bada Boom" (with Solar, Mismolly and Turns)	2022	— (Note: "Bada Boom" did not enter the Gaon Digital Chart, but peaked at number 50 on the Gaon Download Chart)	—N/a	Street Dance Girls Fighter (SGF) Special
"—" denotes releases that did not chart.

==== As featured artist ====
Title	Year	Peak chart positions	Sales	Album
Title	Year	KOR	Sales	Album
"Nothing" (U Sung-eun feat. Moonbyul)	2015	16	KOR: 128,199	2nd Mini Album
"Happy Now" (HA:TFELT feat. Moonbyul)	2019	—	—N/a	Non-album singles
"Say Yes" (Punch feat. Moonbyul)	2020	193	—N/a	Non-album singles
"Greedyy" (JeA feat. Moonbyul)	2020	— (Note: "Greedyy" did not enter the Gaon Digital Chart, but peaked at number 170 on the Gaon Download Chart)	—N/a	Non-album singles
"The Lady" (Bumkey feat. Moonbyul)	2021	135	—N/a	Non-album singles
"Me Without You" (너 없는 난) (Xydo feat. Moonbyul)	2021	—	—N/a	Non-album singles
"Star" (AleXa feat. Moonbyul)	2022	—	KOR: 3,922	Girls Gone Vogue
"—" denotes releases that did not chart.

=== Soundtrack appearances ===
Title	Year	Peak chart positions	Sales	Album
Title	Year	KOR	Sales	Album
"Deep Blue Eyes" (as Girls Next Door)	2017	—	KOR: 16,514	Idol Drama Operation Team OST
"Half of Half" (반의 반) (with Gaho)	2021	— (Note: "Half of Half" did not enter the Gaon Digital Chart, but it peaked at number 81 on the Gaon Download Chart.)	—N/a	Hanyang Diary OST
"—" denotes releases that did not chart.

=== Other charted songs ===
Title	Year	Peak chart positions		Sales	Album
Title	Year	KOR	KOR Hot	Sales	Album
"Like Yesterday" (어제처럼) (with Solar)	2015	54	—N/a	KOR: 33,185+	Two Yoo Project Sugar Man
"Love and Hate" (구차해)	2017	51	88	KOR: 61,384	Purple
"Mirror"	2020	— (Note: "Mirror" did not enter the Gaon Digital Chart, but it appeared at number 153 on the component Download Chart.)	—	—N/a	Dark Side of the Moon
"Moon Movie"	2020	— (Note: "Moon Movie" did not enter the Gaon Digital Chart, but it appeared at number 166 on the component Download Chart.)	—	—N/a	Dark Side of the Moon
"Iljido"	2020	— (Note: "Iljido" did not enter the Gaon Digital Chart, but it appeared at number 182 on the component Download Chart.)	—	—N/a	Dark Side of the Moon
"Snow" (눈)	2020	— (Note: "Snow" did not enter the Gaon Digital Chart, but it appeared at number 190 on the component Download Chart.)	—	—N/a	Dark Side of the Moon
"My Moon" (반달)	2022	— (Note: "My Moon" did not enter the Gaon Digital Chart, but peaked at number 89 on the Gaon Download Chart.)	—	—N/a	C.I.T.T (Cheese in the Trap)
"Intro : WWUD (What Would You Do?)"	2024	— (Note: "Intro : WWUD (What Would You Do?)" did not enter the Circle Digital Chart, but peaked at number 87 on the Circle Download Chart.)	—	—	Starlit of Muse
"Like A Fool"	2024	— (Note: "Like A Fool" did not enter the Circle Digital Chart, but peaked at number 62 on the Circle Download Chart.)	—	—	Starlit of Muse
"Attention Seeker"	2024	— (Note: "Attention Seeker" did not enter the Circle Digital Chart, but peaked at number 67 on the Circle Download Chart.)	—	—	Starlit of Muse
"Nolto" (feat. Hanhae)	2024	— (Note: "Nolto" did not enter the Circle Digital Chart, but peaked at number 58 on the Circle Download Chart.)	—	—	Starlit of Muse
"Timeline"	2024	— (Note: "Timeline" did not enter the Circle Digital Chart, but peaked at number 68 on the Circle Download Chart.)	—	—	Starlit of Muse
"After Sunset" (그런 밤)	2024	— (Note: "After Sunset" did not enter the Circle Digital Chart, but peaked at number 59 on the Circle Download Chart.)	—	—	Starlit of Muse
"Dark Romance"	2024	— (Note: "Dark Romance" did not enter the Circle Digital Chart, but peaked at number 74 on the Circle Download Chart.)	—	—	Starlit of Muse
"Gold"	2024	— (Note: "Gold" did not enter the Circle Digital Chart, but peaked at number 76 on the Circle Download Chart.)	—	—	Starlit of Muse
"Memories" (feat. Onewe)	2024	— (Note: "Memories" did not enter the Circle Digital Chart, but peaked at number 60 on the Circle Download Chart.)	—	—	Starlit of Muse
"Without" (겁이나)	2024	— (Note: "Without" did not enter the Circle Digital Chart, but peaked at number 71 on the Circle Download Chart.)	—	—	Starlit of Muse
"—" denotes releases that did not chart.

== Filmography ==
=== Web series ===
Year	Title	Role	Ref.
2015	Start Love	Yoo Na-young	

=== Television shows ===
Year	Title	Role	Notes	Ref.
2017	Idol Drama Operation Team	Cast member	Episodes 1–8	
2017	Beer Love Trip	Cast member	Episodes 1–13	
2018	King of Mask Singer	Contestant	Episode 179 as "Swan"	
2019	In Sync	Contestant	Episodes 1–4	
2020	Idol Star Dogs Championships	Contestant	Special Chuseok (Won)	
2021–2022	Kick a Goal	Cast Member	Season 2–3	
2022	The Second World	Contestant	1st placer	
2023	Peak Time	Judge		

=== Radio shows ===
Year	Title	Role	Ref.
2020–2021	Avengirls	DJ	
2021–2022	Studio Moon Night	DJ	

== Concerts and tours ==
Museum: An Epic of Starlit (2024)
Date	City	Country	Venue
March 23, 2024	Seoul	South Korea	KBS Arena
March 24, 2024	Seoul	South Korea	KBS Arena
April 7, 2024	Taipei	Taiwan	Taipei International Convention Center
April 13, 2024	Singapore		Capitol Theatre
April 19, 2024	Hong Kong	China	Macpherson Stadium
April 20, 2024	Hong Kong	China	Macpherson Stadium
May 4, 2024	Kaohsiung	Taiwan	Kaohsiung Music Center
May 5, 2024	Kaohsiung	Taiwan	Kaohsiung Music Center
May 8, 2024	Osaka	Japan	Zepp Namba
May 10, 2024	Tokyo	Japan	Zepp DiverCity
August 3, 2024	Macau	China	Broadway Theatre

== Awards and nominations ==
Name of the award ceremony, year presented, category, nominee of the award, and the result of the nomination
Award ceremony	Year	Category	Nominee / Work	Result	Ref.
Brand Customer Loyalty Award	2022	Most Influential Live Streaming Show DJ	Moonbyul	Won	
Korea Grand Music Awards (Note: In May 2026, Moonbyul won the "Artist of May (Solo Female)" category at the Korea Grand Music Awards (KGMA) monthly voting, a recognition determined entirely by fan votes through the Fancast mobile application.)	2026	Artist of May – Female Solo	Moonbyul	Won	
Melon Music Awards	2017	Hot Trend Award	"Deep Blue Eyes" (as Girl's Next Door)	Nominated	
