= List of Mamamoo concert tours =

Mamamoo concert tours
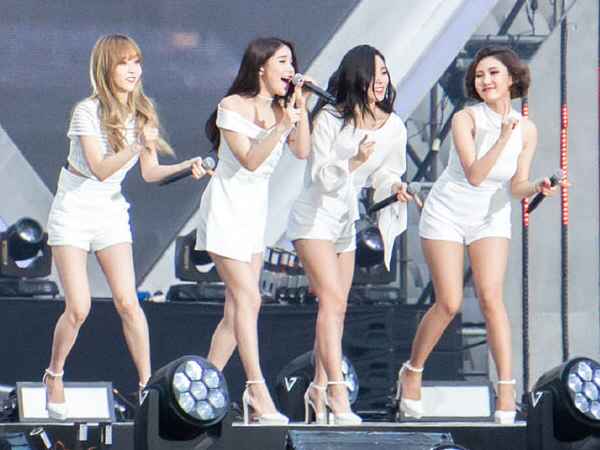
- Mamamoo performing in 2016
- Regional tours: 4
- Solo concerts: 2
- Virtual concerts: 3
- World tours: 2

South Korean girl group Mamamoo has performed in four regional tours in Asia, two solo concerts, three virtual concerts, and two world tours since their debut in 2014. Their first world tour was the My Con World Tour (2022-2023), followed by the 4ward World Tour (2026). The group has also appeared on numerous television programs in South Korea and at international festivals such as KCON.

== Regional tours ==
=== 2018 Mamamoo Concert 4Seasons S/S ===
2018 Mamamoo Concert 4Seasons S/S
- Asia tour by Mamamoo
- Associated album: Yellow Flower; Red Moon
- Start date: August 18, 2018
- End date: September 2, 2018
- Legs: 1
- No. of shows: 2 in South Korea; 1 in Taiwan; 1 in Hong Kong; 4 in total

Mamamoo concert chronology
- Moosical: Curtain Call (2017); 4Seasons S/S (2018); 4Seasons F/W (2019)

Set list
1. "Paint Me"
2. "Décalcomanie"
3. "Freakin Shoes"
4. "Rude Boy"
5. Immortal Songs: Singing the Legend – "Violet Fragrance"
6. "Sky! Sky!"
7. "Rainy Season"
8. "I Miss You"
9. "Gentleman"
10. "Piano Man"
11. "AHH OOP!"
12. "Hello (Extended Ver.)"
13. "Mr. Ambiguous"
14. "Mirror" (Moonbyul Solo)
15. "Moon Movie" (Moonbyul Solo)
16. "Chun-Li" (original by Nicki Minaj) (Solar Solo)
17. "Despacito" (original by Luis Fonsi) (Solar Solo)
18. "No Thanks" (Wheein Solo)
19. "Finesse" (original by Bruno Mars) (Wheein Solo)
20. "The Lion Sleeps Tonight" (original by The Tokens) (Hwasa Solo)
21. "HandClap" (original by Fitz and the Tantrums) (Hwasa Solo)
22. "Taller than You"
23. "AZE GAG"
24. "I Love Too"
25. "Star Wind Flower Sun"
26. "Starry Night"
27. "Sleep In The Car"
28. "Yes I Am"
29. "Egotistic"
30. "Midnight Summer Dream"
31. "You're the Best"
32. "Um Oh Ah Yeh"

2018 Mamamoo 4season S/S Concert Tour was held after a year of their 2017 concert. The concerts were held from August 18 to September 2 in Seoul, Taipei and Hong Kong.

Concert dates
Date	City	Country	Venue	Attendance
August 18, 2018	Seoul	South Korea	SK Olympic Handball Gymnasium	10,000
August 19, 2018	Seoul	South Korea	SK Olympic Handball Gymnasium	10,000
September 1, 2018	New Taipei City	Taiwan	Xinzhuang Gymnasium	5,000
September 2, 2018	Hong Kong	China	AsiaWorld–Expo Hall 2	—

=== Mamamoo 1st Concert Tour in Japan ===
Date	City	Country	Venue
October 5, 2018 (Two shows)	Osaka	Japan	Zepp Namba
October 7, 2018 (Two shows)	Tokyo	Japan	Stellar Ball
October 9, 2018	Nagoya	Japan	Zepp Nagoya

=== 2019 Mamamoo Concert 4Seasons F/W ===
2019 Mamamoo Concert 4Seasons F/W
- Asia tour by Mamamoo
- Associated album: Blue;s; White Wind
- Start date: April 19, 2019
- End date: September 28, 2019
- Legs: 1
- No. of shows: 5 in South Korea; 2 in Taiwan; 1 in Hong Kong; 8 in total

Mamamoo concert chronology
- 4Seasons S/S (2018); 4Seasons F/W (2019); My Con World Tour (2022)

Set list in Seoul, Taiwan and Hong Kong

VCR 1

1. "Paint Me"
2. "Starry Night"
3. "Spring Fever"

VCR 2

4. "Rainy Season"
5. "Egotistic"
6. "No more drama"
7. "Wind Flower"

VCR 3

8. "Better than I thought"
9. "My star"
10. "gogobebe"

VCR 4

11. "SELFISH" (Moonbyul Solo)
12. TVXQ Song Medley – "I Believe", "Hug", "The Way U Are", "Before U Go", "Rising Sun" (Moonbyul Solo)
13. Korean Drum Dance (Moonbyul Solo)
14. "Moon Movie" (Moonbyul Solo)
15. "25" (Wheein Solo)
16. Waltz Dance (Wheein Solo)
17. "7 Rings" (original by Ariana Grande) (Wheein Solo)
18. "Be Like Me" (original by Lil Pump) (Wheein Solo)
19. "Runaway Baby" (original by Bruno Mars) (Wheein Solo)
20. "Drum" (Wheein Solo)
21. "Crazy in Love" (original by Beyoncé) (Hwasa Solo)
22. "Orange Colored Sky" (original by Nat King Cole) (Hwasa Solo)
23. "You da One" (original by Rihanna) (Hwasa Solo)
24. "I Do Me" (Hwasa Solo)
25. "Mr. Ambiguous" (Hwasa Solo)
26. "You're the Best" (Hwasa Solo)
27. "Be Calm" (Hwasa Solo)
28. "Don't" (Hwasa Solo)
29. "Twit" (Hwasa Solo)
30. "My Heart Will Go On" (original by Celine Dion) (Solar Solo)
31. "Hello" (Solar Solo)
32. "Fever" (original by Beyoncé) (Solar Solo)
33. "Shut Up and Let Me Go" (original by The Ting Tings) (Solar Solo)
34. "Fire" (original by BTS) (Solar Solo)

VCR 5

36. "Taller than You"
37. "Waggy"

VCR 6

38. "I Love Too"
39. "Star Wind Flower Sun"
40. "Um Oh Ah Yeh" (Acapella Ver.)
41. "Décalcomanie"
42. "Yes I Am"

VCR 6

43. "You're the Best"
44. "Mr. Ambiguous"
Set list in Daegu

VCR 1

1. "Starry Night"
2. "Rainy Season"
3. "Egotistic"
4. "Gleam"

VCR 2

5. "No more drama"
6. "Wind Flower"

VCR 3

7. "Better than I thought"
8. "My star"
9. "Gogobebe"

VCR 4

10. "SELFISH" (Moonbyul Solo)
11. TVXQ Song Medley – "I Believe", "Hug", "The Way U Are", "Before U Go", "Rising Sun" (Moonbyul Solo)
12. Korean Drum Dance (Moonbyul Solo)
13. "Moon Movie" (Moonbyul Solo)
14. "25" (Wheein Solo)
15. Waltz Dance (Wheein Solo)
16. "7 Rings" (original by Ariana Grande) (Wheein Solo)
17. "Be Like Me" (original by Lil Pump) (Wheein Solo)
18. "Runaway Baby" (original by Bruno Mars) (Wheein Solo)
19. Drum (Wheein Solo)
20. "Crazy in Love" (original by Beyoncé) (Hwasa Solo)
21. "Orange Colored Sky" (original by Nat King Cole) (Hwasa Solo)
22. "You da One" (original by Rihanna) (Hwasa Solo)
23. "I Do Me" (Hwasa Solo)
24. "Mr. Ambiguous" (Hwasa Solo)
25. "You're the Best" (Hwasa Solo)
26. "Be Calm" (Hwasa Solo)
27. "Don't" (Hwasa Solo)
28. "Twit" (Hwasa Solo)
29. "My Heart Will Go On" (original by Celine Dion) (Solar Solo)
30. "Hello" (Solar Solo)
31. "Fever" (original by Beyoncé) (Solar Solo)
32. "Shut Up and Let Me Go" (original by The Ting Tings) (Solar Solo)
33. "Fire" (original by BTS) (Solar Solo)
34. Immortal Songs: Singing the Legend – "Backwoods", "Love Story Of A Girl", T"he Way to Sanpo", "You", "In My Fading Memories", "Wonderful Confession", "Flying into the Night Sky"
35. "I Love Too"
36. "Star Wind Flower Sun"
37. "I'm Your Fan"
38. "Décalcomanie"
39. "Yes I Am"

VCR 5

40. "Words Don't Come Easy"
41. "Um Oh Ah Yeh"

Concert dates
Date	City	Country	Venue	Attendance
April 19, 2019	Seoul	South Korea	Jangchung Gymnasium	—
April 20, 2019	Seoul	South Korea	Jangchung Gymnasium	—
April 21, 2019	Seoul	South Korea	Jangchung Gymnasium	—
June 15, 2019	New Taipei City	Taiwan	Xinzhuang Gymnasium	10,000
June 16, 2019	New Taipei City	Taiwan	Xinzhuang Gymnasium	10,000
July 27, 2019	Daegu	South Korea	Daegu EXCO	—
July 28, 2019	Daegu	South Korea	Daegu EXCO	—
September 28, 2019	Hong Kong	China	AsiaWorld–Arena	—

=== Mamamoo 2nd Concert Tour in Japan: 4season Final ===
Date	City	Country	Venue
August 11, 2019	Yokohama	Japan	Pacifico Yokohama
August 13, 2019	Osaka	Japan	Zepp Osaka Bayside

== World tours ==
=== My Con World Tour ===
My Con World Tour
- World tour by Mamamoo
- Associated album: Mic On
- Start date: November 18, 2022
- End date: June 18, 2023
- No. of shows: 18 in Asia; 9 in North America; 27 total

Mamamoo concert chronology
- 4Seasons F/W (2019); My Con World Tour (2022); 4ward World Tour (2026)

Mamamoo's My Con World Tour was announced on October 12, 2022, beginning with a three-day at the Olympic Hall in Seoul followed by two shows in Japan. Ticket sales for the concerts opened a week later. On November 16, additional dates for the tour were added in Hong Kong, Singapore, Malaysia and the Philippines. The tour concluded on June 18, 2023, in Seoul.

Set list in Seoul
1. "1,2,3 Eoi!"
2. "Mr. Ambiguous"
3. "Freakin Shoes"
4. "New York"
5. "Dingga"
6. "Emotion"
7. "Funky Boy"
8. "You're the Best"
9. "Aya"
10. "Illella"
11. "Taller than You"
12. "Mumumumuch"
13. "Water Color" (original by Wheein) (Solar Solo)
14. "Eclipse" (original by Moonbyul) (Hwasa Solo)
15. "Honey" (original by Solar) (Wheein Solo)
16. "Twit" (original by Hwasa) (Moonbyul Solo)
17. "Spit It Out" (original by Solar) (4-member version)
18. "Make Me Happy" (original by Wheein) (4-member version)
19. "Lunatic" (original by Moonbyul) (4-member version)
20. "Maria" (original by Hwasa) (4-member version)
21. "Paint Me"
22. "I Love Too"
23. "Star Wind Flower Sun"
24. "Decalcomanie"
25. "Hip"
26. "Egotistic"
27. "Gogobebe" (Rock version)
28. "Starry Night"
29. "Wind Flower"
30. "Travel"
31. "Finally"
32. "Yes I Am"
33. "L.I.E.C"
34. "Um Oh Ah Yeh"
Set list in Japan
1. "1,2,3 Eoi!"
2. "Mr. Ambiguous"
3. "Freakin Shoes"
4. "New York"
5. "Dingga"
6. "Emotion"
7. "Funky Boy"
8. "You're the Best"
9. "Aya"
10. "Illella"
11. "Taller than You"
12. "Mumumumuch"
13. "Water Color" (original by Wheein) (Solar Solo)
14. "Eclipse" (original by Moonbyul) (Hwasa Solo)
15. "Honey" (original by Solar) (Wheein Solo)
16. "Twit" (original by Hwasa) (Moonbyul Solo)
17. "Spit It Out" (original by Solar) (4-member version)
18. "Make Me Happy" (original by Wheein) (4-member version)
19. "Lunatic" (original by Moonbyul) (4-member version)
20. "Maria" (original by Hwasa) (4-member version)
21. "Paint Me"
22. "I Love Too"
23. "Star Wind Flower Sun"
24. "Decalcomanie" (Japanese version)
25. "Hip"
26. "Egotistic"
27. "Gogobebe" (Rock version)
28. "Starry Night" (Japanese version)
29. "Wind Flower" (Japanese version)
30. "Travel"
31. "You Don't Know Me"
32. "Sleep Talk"
33. "Yes I Am"
34. "L.I.E.C"
35. "Um Oh Ah Yeh"

Concert dates
Date	City	Country	Venue	Attendance
Asia
November 18, 2022	Seoul	South Korea	Olympic Hall	—
November 19, 2022	Seoul	South Korea	Olympic Hall	—
November 20, 2022	Seoul	South Korea	Olympic Hall	—
November 26, 2022	Chiba	Japan	Makuhari Messe Exhibition Hall	—
November 27, 2022	Chiba	Japan	Makuhari Messe Exhibition Hall	—
January 7, 2023	Hong Kong	China	AsiaWorld–Expo Hall 5 & 7	—
January 8, 2023	Hong Kong	China	AsiaWorld–Expo Hall 5 & 7	—
January 14, 2023	Taipei	Taiwan	NTSU Arena	14,000
January 15, 2023	Taipei	Taiwan	NTSU Arena	14,000
January 29, 2023	Bangkok	Thailand	IMPACT Exhibition Hall 5	—
February 5, 2023	Jakarta	Indonesia	Indonesia Convention Exhibition	—
February 8, 2023	Singapore		The Star Theatre	—
February 9, 2023	Singapore		The Star Theatre	—
February 11, 2023	Shah Alam (Note: Promoted as Kuala Lumpur)	Malaysia	Malawati Indoor Stadium	—
February 12, 2023	Manila	Philippines	Araneta Coliseum	—
North America
May 16, 2023	New York City	United States	UBS Arena	70,000
May 18, 2023	Baltimore	United States	CFG Bank Arena	70,000
May 20, 2023	Atlanta	United States	State Farm Arena	70,000
May 22, 2023	Nashville	United States	Bridgestone Arena	70,000
May 24, 2023	Fort Worth	United States	Dickies Arena	70,000
May 27, 2023	Chicago	United States	Wintrust Arena	70,000
May 31, 2023	Glendale	United States	Desert Diamond Arena	70,000
June 2, 2023	Oakland	United States	Oakland Arena	70,000
June 4, 2023	Los Angeles	United States	Kia Forum	70,000
Encores
June 16, 2023	Seoul	South Korea	SK Olympic Handball Gymnasium	—
June 17, 2023	Seoul	South Korea	SK Olympic Handball Gymnasium	—
June 18, 2023	Seoul	South Korea	SK Olympic Handball Gymnasium	—
Total				N/A

== Solo concerts ==
=== 2016 Mamamoo Concert Moosical ===
2016 Mamamoo Concert 'Moosical'
- Concert by Mamamoo
- Venue: Olympic Hall
- Associated album: Melting
- Start date: August 13, 2016
- End date: August 14, 2016
- Duration: 180 minutes
- Attendance: 7,000

2016 Mamamoo Concert Moosical was the first solo concert by Mamamoo, held two 2 years after their debut, setting a new record of being the earliest solo concert among all girl groups. It was held on August 13 and 14, 2016 at Olympic Hall in Olympic Park, Seoul, to commemorate their 2nd anniversary. The name of the concert has the meaning of showing a wonderful musical performance starring Mamamoo. Tickets to the show were sold out in less than a minute after opening to the public on June 22.

Set list
1. "Mr. Ambiguous"
2. "Baton Touch"
3. "Peppermint Chocolate"
4. "Piano Man"
5. "AHH OOP!"
6. "Heeheehaheho"
7. "Don't Be Happy"
8. "Love Lane"
9. "A Little Bit"
10. "Don't Forget" (original by Crush) (Moonbyul cover)
11. "Moderato" (Wheein solo) (Note: Wheein performed "Moderate" with rapper Hash Swan on August 13, and rapper Reddy on August 14.)
12. "I Will Always Love You" (original by Dolly Parton) (Solar cover)
13. "SexyBack" (original by Justin Timberlake) (Solar cover)
14. "Stay" (original by Rihanna) (Hwasa cover)
15. "You Give Love a Bad Name" (original by Bon Jovi) (Hwasa cover)
16. "Taller than You"
17. "Girl Crush"
18. "Pink Panties" (Hwasa Solo)
19. Girl group Song Medley – Gfriend's "Rough", Apink's "No No No", EXID's "L.I.E", Sistar's "I Like That", Twice's "Cheer Up" and Red Velvet's "Dumb Dumb"
20. "Angel" (Solar and Whein) (Note: Unreleased song)
21. "DAB DAB" (Moonbyul and Hwasa)
22. "Words Don't Come Easy"
23. "Emotion"
24. "Funky Boy"
25. "I Miss You"
26. "I Love Too"

Encore

1. "You're the Best"
2. "Um Oh Ah Yeh"
3. "Love Lane (Inst.)"

Guest Performance

- During the first show on August 13, the guest was Vromance, who performed a girl group medley – Mamamoo's "You're the Best", Twice's "Cheer Up", and Wonder Girls' "Why So Lonely".
- During the second show on August 14, the guest was I.O.I, who performed "Pick Me".

Notes

Concert dates
Date	City	Country	Venue	Attendance
August 13, 2016	Seoul	South Korea	Olympic Hall	7,000
August 14, 2016	Seoul	South Korea	Olympic Hall	7,000

=== 2017 Mamamoo Concert Moosical: Curtain Call ===
2017 Mamamoo Concert 'Moosical: Curtain Call'
- Concert by Mamamoo
- Venue: Olympic Hall (Seoul); KBS Busan Hall (Busan)
- Associated album: Memory; Purple
- Start date: March 3, 2017
- End date: August 20, 2017
- Duration: 180 minutes
- Attendance: 16,000

2017 Mamamoo Concert Moosical: Curtain Call is the second concert held by Mamamoo in 7 months since their first solo concert held in August 2016. The concert is an upgraded version of Moosical and plans to present a differentiated stage with a more colorful repertoire and performances. The concert was held at Olympic Hall from March 3 to 5, 2017, and later at KBS Busan Hall from August 19 to 20, 2017. All 10,000 tickets to the concert in Seoul were sold out in one minute.

Set list
1. "Mr. Ambiguous"
2. "Baton Touch"
3. "Peppermint Chocolate"
4. "Piano Man"
5. "New York"
6. "My Hometown"
7. "Memory"
8. "Love Lane"
9. "A Little Bit"
10. "Moderato" (Wheein solo)
11. "Say My Name" (original by Destiny's Child) (Wheein solo)
12. "I Believe (original by TVXQ) (Moonbyul solo)
13. "Love & Hate" (Moonbyul solo)
14. "I Will Always Love You" (original by Dolly Parton) (Solar cover)
15. "SexyBack" (original by Justin Timberlake) (Solar cover)
16. "Diamonds" (original by Rihanna) (Hwasa cover)
17. "HookGA" High4:20 (Hwasa cover)
18. "I Do Me" (Hwasa cover)
19. "You Give Love a Bad Name" (original by Bon Jovi) (Hwasa cover)
20. "Taller than You"
21. "Girl Crush"
22. "Pink Panties" (Hwasa Solo)
23. Immortal Songs: Singing the Legend – "Backwoods", "Love Story Of A Girl", T"he Way to Sanpo", "You", "In My Fading Memories", "Wonderful Confession", "Flying into the Night Sky"
24. "Words Don't Come Easy"
25. "Woo Hoo"
26. "Funky Boy"
27. "You're the Best"
28. "I Miss You"
29. "I Love Too"
30. "Décalcomanie"
31. "Um Oh Ah Yeh"

Concert dates
Date	City	Country	Venue	Attendance
March 3, 2017	Seoul	South Korea	Olympic Hall	10,000
March 4, 2017	Seoul	South Korea	Olympic Hall	10,000
March 5, 2017	Seoul	South Korea	Olympic Hall	10,000
August 19, 2017	Busan	South Korea	KBS Busan Hall	6,000
August 20, 2017	Busan	South Korea	KBS Busan Hall	6,000
Total				16,000

== Concert participation ==
Event	Date	City	Country	Venue
LA Korean Festival 2015	October 3, 2015	Los Angeles	United States	Seoul International Park
KCON Jeju 2015	November 7, 2015	Jeju City	South Korea	Halla Gymnasium
KBS Song Festival	December 30, 2015	Seoul	South Korea	Gocheok Sky Dome
Gala Vietnam Top Hits 2016	January 19, 2016	Ho Chi Minh City	Vietnam	Lan Anh Stadium
KCON	June 25, 2016	Newark	United States	Prudential Center
Korea Sale Festa 2016	September 30, 2016	Seoul	South Korea	Yeongdong-daero
Melon Music Awards	November 19, 2016	Seoul	South Korea	Gocheok Sky Dome
KBS Song Festival	December 29, 2016	Seoul	South Korea	KBS Hall
Ulsan Summer Festival	June 24, 2017	Ulsan	South Korea	Ulsan Stadium
Music Bank	August 4, 2017	Singapore		Suntec Singapore
ABU TV Song Festival 2017	November 1, 2017	Chengdu	China	S1 SRT Studio
KBS Song Festival	December 29, 2017	Seoul	South Korea	KBS Hall
Dream Concert	May 12, 2018	Seoul	South Korea	Seoul World Cup Stadium
Melon Music Awards	December 1, 2018	Seoul	South Korea	Gocheok Sky Dome
MAMA Awards	December 12, 2018	Saitama	Japan	Saitama Super Arena
Golden Disc Awards	January 5, 2019	Seoul	South Korea	Gocheok Sky Dome
Hello Mamamoo! Fan Meeting	January 26, 2019	Bangkok	Thailand	Impact Arena
Hello Mamamoo! Fan Meeting	February 23, 2019	Jakarta	Indonesia	Istora Senayan
The Fact Music Awards	April 24, 2019	Incheon	South Korea	Namdong Gymnasium
Hello Mamamoo! Fan Meeting	April 27, 2019	Singapore		Zepp Big Box
Dream Concert	May 18, 2019	Seoul	South Korea	Seoul World Cup Stadium
SBS Super Concert	July 6, 2019	Hong Kong	China	AsiaWorld–Arena
Ulsan Summer Festival	July 22, 2019	Ulsan	South Korea	Ulsan Stadium
Jeonju Ultimate Music Festival	August 2, 2019	Jeonju	South Korea	Jeonju Stadium
KCON	August 18, 2019	Los Angeles	United States	Staples Center
Soribada Best K-Music Awards	August 22, 2019	Seoul	South Korea	KSPO Dome
V Live Awards V Heartbeat	November 16, 2019	Seoul	South Korea	Gocheok Sky Dome
Melon Music Awards	November 30, 2019	Seoul	South Korea	Gocheok Sky Dome
MAMA Awards	December 4, 2019	Nagoya	Japan	Nagoya Dome
KBS Music Festival	December 27, 2019	Seoul	South Korea	KBS Hall
Golden Disc Awards	January 4, 2020	Seoul	South Korea	Gocheok Sky Dome
Soribada Best K-Music Awards	August 13, 2020	Seoul	South Korea	SK Olympic Handball Gymnasium
MAMA Awards	December 6, 2020	Paju	South Korea	CJ Contents World
Golden Disc Awards	January 9, 2021	Seoul	South Korea	Gocheok Sky Dome
KPOP FLEX FESTIVAL	May 14, 2022	Frankfurt	Germany	Waldstadion
KPOP FLEX FESTIVAL	May 15, 2022	Frankfurt	Germany	Waldstadion
Sky Festival	September 24, 2022	Incheon	South Korea	Incheon International Airport Culture Park
Ink Concert	October 1, 2022	Incheon	South Korea	Incheon Munhak Stadium
Music Bank World Tour	April 8, 2023	Paris	France	Paris La Défense Arena
K-Pop Super Live	August 11, 2023	Seoul	South Korea	Seoul World Cup Stadium

== Virtual concerts ==
- Moomoo Tour: "Best Friend, Best Travel" (2021)
- LiveNOW K-Pop Presents: Mamamoo (2021)
- 2021 Mamamoo Online Concert 'WAW' (2021)

== See also ==
- List of Solar live performances
- List of Moonbyul live performances
- List of Wheein live performances
- List of Hwasa live performances
- Mamamoo+ concert tours
