= 4ward World Tour =

Concert tour by Mamamoo

- World tour by Mamamoo
- Official poster
- Location: Asia; North America; Oceania
- Associated albums: 4ward
- Start date: 19 June 2026
- End date: 3 January 2027
- No. of shows: 25

Mamamoo concert chronology
- My Con World Tour (2022–2023); 4ward World Tour (2026-2027)

The 4ward World Tour (Note: Stylized as MAMAMOO 2026 WORLD TOUR <4WARD>) is the second worldwide concert tour by South Korean girl group Mamamoo. It is held in support of their single album 4ward (2026), the group's first new music release since Mic On (2022). The tour began on 19 June 2026 in Seoul, South Korea, and is set to conclude on 3 January 2027 in Seoul, with a total of 25 shows across Asia, North America and Oceania.

== Background ==
Following the release of the extended play Mic On in 2022, Mamamoo entered a hiatus while the members focused on their individual careers and side projects including Mamamoo+. In October 2025, RBW confirmed that Mamamoo would reunite in 2026 and that a world tour was being planned. In December 2025, RBW confirmed that the group would release a new album in June 2026 and would embark on a large-scale world tour.

Details for the tour were revealed on 3 April 2026, when Mamamoo released the 2026 World Tour announcement poster through their official social media. The world tour was confirmed to start in Seoul on 19 June, the 12th anniversary of the group's debut. On 11 May, RBW announced the title of the tour to be "4ward", which is a combination of the number four to represent the four members and the word forward, symbolizing Mamamoo's progress and their new journey as a group. In planning the tour, the members expressed a desire to dedicate their performances to their fans, and Hwasa stated that she wanted her live performances to show "an energy that is on a completely different level from the studio recordings". The first concerts of the tour were held at the Olympic Hall in Seoul from 19 June to 21 June.

The 4ward World Tour also included a leg in the United States, marking the group's first performances in the country since the My Con World Tour in 2023. The leg began in Belmont Park in New York, followed by shows in Chicago, Illinois, Fort Worth and Cedar Park in Texas, Los Angeles and San Jose in California, and Kent, Washington.

Additional shows in other countries were revealed in the months following the tour's announcement. On 7 July, shows were confirmed in Jakarta and in Kuala Lumpur, and on 8 July, two shows were announced to be held in Sydney and Melbourne in Australia in September. On 20 July, a show in Tokyo was confirmed for October. On 11 September, the Jakarta show was cancelled due to unsafe conditions caused by volcanic activity at Anak Krakatoa. On 15 September, RBW announced that the main portion of the tour would conclude with two shows in Taipei on 28 and 29 November. On 4 November, two encore shows marketed as the "4ward World Tour Finale" were announced to be held in Seoul in January 2027, marking the conclusion of the tour.

== Concert synopsis ==
Mamamoo performing at the Kent show on 30 August 2026

The set list and production of the 4ward World Tour were designed to be a celebration of the past 12 years of Mamamoo's career. The show opened with the group's debut single, "Mr. Ambiguous", and continued to other songs such as "Destiny", "No More Drama", and "Egotistic". The group further showcased several of their hit songs such as "Piano Man", "Décalcomanie", "I Miss You", "Rainy Season", and "Starry Night", and performed a trot arrangement of "Taller Than You" which was specially made for the tour.

The tour also featured solo stages highlighting each member's individual work, which included Hwasa's "So Cute", Wheein's "The Symphony of Fxxkboys", Moonbyul's "Hertz", and Solar's "Blues". During their solo performances, the members left the main stage and walked the aisles of the venue to greet fans.

The group then performed their most recent release, "4 Flowers", before proceeding to several of their other songs, including "Aya", "Illella", "Hip", "Dingga", "Gogobebe", and "Wind Flower". The setlist included encore variations, with different encore songs performed at each show. The concert concluded with the members thanking their fans for their support.

== Set list ==
This is the set list for the concert in Seoul on 19 June. It is not intended to be representative of all shows.

1. "Mr. Ambiguous"
2. "Destiny"
3. "No More Drama"
4. "Egotistic" (Blistering sun ver.)
5. "4x4ever"
6. "My Star"
7. "Piano Man"
8. "Décalcomanie"
9. "I Miss You"
10. "Rainy Season"
11. "Starry Night"
12. "Taller Than You" (Trot ver.)
13. "Sleep in the Car"
14. Medley: "AZE GAG" / "Waggy" / "NEW YORK" / "Freakin Shoes" / "Recipe" / "Baton Touch"
15. "So Cute" (Hwasa solo)
16. "The Symphony of Fxxkboys" (Wheein solo)
17. "Hertz" (Moonbyul solo)
18. "Blues" (Solar solo)
19. "Star Wind Flower Sun"
20. "I Love Too"
21. "4 Flowers"
22. "Aya" (Traditional ver.)
23. "Illella"
24. "Hip" (Remix ver.)
25. "Dingga"
26. "Gogobebe" (Rock ver.)
27. "Wind Flower" (Dramatic ver.)

Encore

28. "You're the Best"
29. "Yes I am"
30. "Better"
31. "Um Oh Ah Yeh"

== Reception ==
The 4ward World Tour received positive reviews. Choi Lee-jeong of Chosun Ilbo, covering the first Seoul shows, noted the tour's extensive setlist, which included nearly 40 songs, and praised the group's "unrivaled live performance skills". Jang Young-kwon of Top Star News, covering the Singapore shows, praised the diversity of the set list and highlighted the individuality shown by the solo stages. Jaehwa Bernardo of ABS-CBN wrote that the Manila concert delivered "a career retrospective through a setlist composed of hit singles and beloved B-sides", and commended the group for the diversity of their music and their focus on fan interactions.

== Tour dates ==
List of concert dates
| Date | City | Country | Venue | Attendance |
|---|---|---|---|---|
| 19 June 2026 | Seoul | South Korea | Olympic Hall | — |
| 20 June 2026 | Seoul | South Korea | Olympic Hall | — |
| 21 June 2026 | Seoul | South Korea | Olympic Hall | — |
| 4 July 2026 | Kaohsiung | Taiwan | Kaohsiung Arena | 20,000 |
| 5 July 2026 | Kaohsiung | Taiwan | Kaohsiung Arena | 20,000 |
| 18 July 2026 | Macau | China | Londoner Arena | — |
| 19 July 2026 | Macau | China | Londoner Arena | — |
| 31 July 2026 | Singapore | | Singapore Indoor Stadium | — |
| 8 August 2026 | Quezon City | Philippines | Araneta Coliseum | — |
| 12 August 2026 | New York City | United States | UBS Arena | — |
| 15 August 2026 | Chicago | United States | Wintrust Arena | — |
| 18 August 2026 | Fort Worth | United States | Dickies Arena | — |
| 21 August 2026 | Austin | United States | H-E-B Center at Cedar Park | — |
| 25 August 2026 | Los Angeles | United States | Crypto.com Arena | — |
| 27 August 2026 | San Jose | United States | SAP Center | — |
| 30 August 2026 | Kent | United States | Accesso ShoWare Center | — |
| 22 September 2026 | Melbourne | Australia | John Cain Arena | — |
| 25 September 2026 | Sydney | Australia | TikTok Entertainment Centre | — |
| 4 October 2026 | Hong Kong | China | Kai Tak Arena | — |
| 10 October 2026 | Kuala Lumpur | Malaysia | Unifi Arena | — |
| 25 October 2026 | Tokyo | Japan | Tokyo Garden Theater | — |
| 28 November 2026 | Taipei | Taiwan | Taipei Arena | — |
| 29 November 2026 | Taipei | Taiwan | Taipei Arena | — |
| 2 January 2027 | Seoul | South Korea | Ticketlink Live Arena | — |
| 3 January 2027 | Seoul | South Korea | Ticketlink Live Arena | — |
| Total | | | | — |

List of cancelled shows
| Date | City | Country | Venue | Reason |
|---|---|---|---|---|
| 19 September 2026 | Jakarta | Indonesia | Nusantara International Convention Exhibition | Unsafe conditions caused by volcanic activity |

== See also ==
- List of Mamamoo concert tours
