= Egotistic =

Single by Mamamoo

from the EP Red Moon
- Language: Korean
- Released: July 16, 2018
- Studio: RBW Studio
- Genre: K-pop
- Label: RBW
- Songwriters: Park Woo-sang; Kim Do-hoon
- Producers: Park Woo-sang; Kim Do-hoon

Mamamoo singles chronology
"Rainy Season" (2018)	"Egotistic" (2018)	"Wind Flower" (2018)

Music video
- "Egotistic" on YouTube

"Egotistic" (Korean: 너나 해) is a song by South Korean girl group Mamamoo. It was released on July 16, 2018 as the second single from the group's seventh extended play Red Moon (2018). An upbeat pop song with Latin influences, "Egotistic" was written and composed by Kim Do-hoon and Park Woo-sang.

== Background and release ==
In January 2018, Mamamoo released the digital single "Paint Me", a precursor to their upcoming album project titled 'Four Seasons, Four Colors', in which the group would release four EPs, each focusing on one member and a corresponding season. In March 2018, the group released the first installments in the series, Yellow Flower and the single "Starry Night". On July 16, 2018, Red Moon was released as the second installment of the series, with "Egotistic" serving as the main single for the era.

On August 7, 2019, the re-recorded Japanese-language version of the song was released as part of the group's debut Japanese album, 4colors, by JVCKenwood Victor Entertainment. On September 15, 2021, a remix of the song subtitled the "Blistering Sun Version" was released as part of their debut compilation album I Say Mamamoo: The Best.

== Composition ==
Musically, "Egotistic" is a K-pop song with strong Latin influences. At a runtime of three minutes and 16 seconds, the song is composed in the key of E-flat minor with a tempo of 98 beats per minute.

== Commercial performance ==
"Egotistic" debuted and peaked at number four on the Gaon Digital Chart, with over 47.1 million index points earned in its first week, debuting at number one on the component Gaon Download Chart. It remained within the Gaon Digital Chart's top-five in its second week, with 44.4 million index points, and spent seven weeks in the chart's top-ten before slipping to number 11 in early September. On the monthly rendition of the chart, "Egotistic" peaked at number six in August. Overall, "Egotistic" was the 48th highest-performing song of 2018 on the Circle Digital Chart, being the 41st most-downloaded and 49th most-streamed.

Elsewhere, "Egotistic" peaked at number 27 in Singapore and at number four on the Billboard World Digital Song Sales chart. It charted for five weeks on the latter, making it their second longest-charting song alongside "Gogobebe" (2019).

== Track listings ==
Digital download/streaming

1. "Egotistic" (너나 해) – 3:16

Digital download/streaming – Japanese Version

1. "Egotistic (Japanese Version)" – 3:18

Digital download/streaming – remix

1. "Egotistic (Blistering Sun Version)" – 3:31

== Accolades ==
Music program wins for "Egotistic"
Song	Program	Date	Ref.
"Egotistic"	The Show	July 24, 2018	
"Egotistic"	M Countdown	August 2, 2018	

== Charts ==
=== Weekly charts ===
Weekly chart performance for "Egotistic"
Chart (2018)	Peak position
Singapore (RIAS)	27
South Korea (Circle)	4
South Korea (K-pop Hot 100)	4
US World Digital Song Sales (Billboard)	4

Weekly chart performance for "Egotistic (Blistering Sun Version)"
Chart (2021)	Peak position
South Korea Download (Circle)	121

=== Monthly charts ===
Monthly chart performance for "Egotistic"
Chart (2018)	Peak position
South Korea (Circle)	6

=== Year-end charts ===
2018 year-end chart performance for "Egotistic"
Chart (2018)	Peak position
South Korea (Circle)	48

2019 year-end chart performance for "Egotistic"
Chart (2019)	Position
South Korea Download (Gaon)	169

== Release history ==
Release history and formats for "Egotistic"
Region	Date	Format	Version	Label	Ref.
Various	July 16, 2018	Digital download; streaming	Korean	RBW; Kakao M	
Japan	August 7, 2019	Digital download; streaming	Japanese	Victor Entertainment	
Various	September 15, 2021	Digital download; streaming	Remix	RBW; Kakao Entertainment	
