= List of awards and nominations received by Mamamoo =

Mamamoo awards and nominations
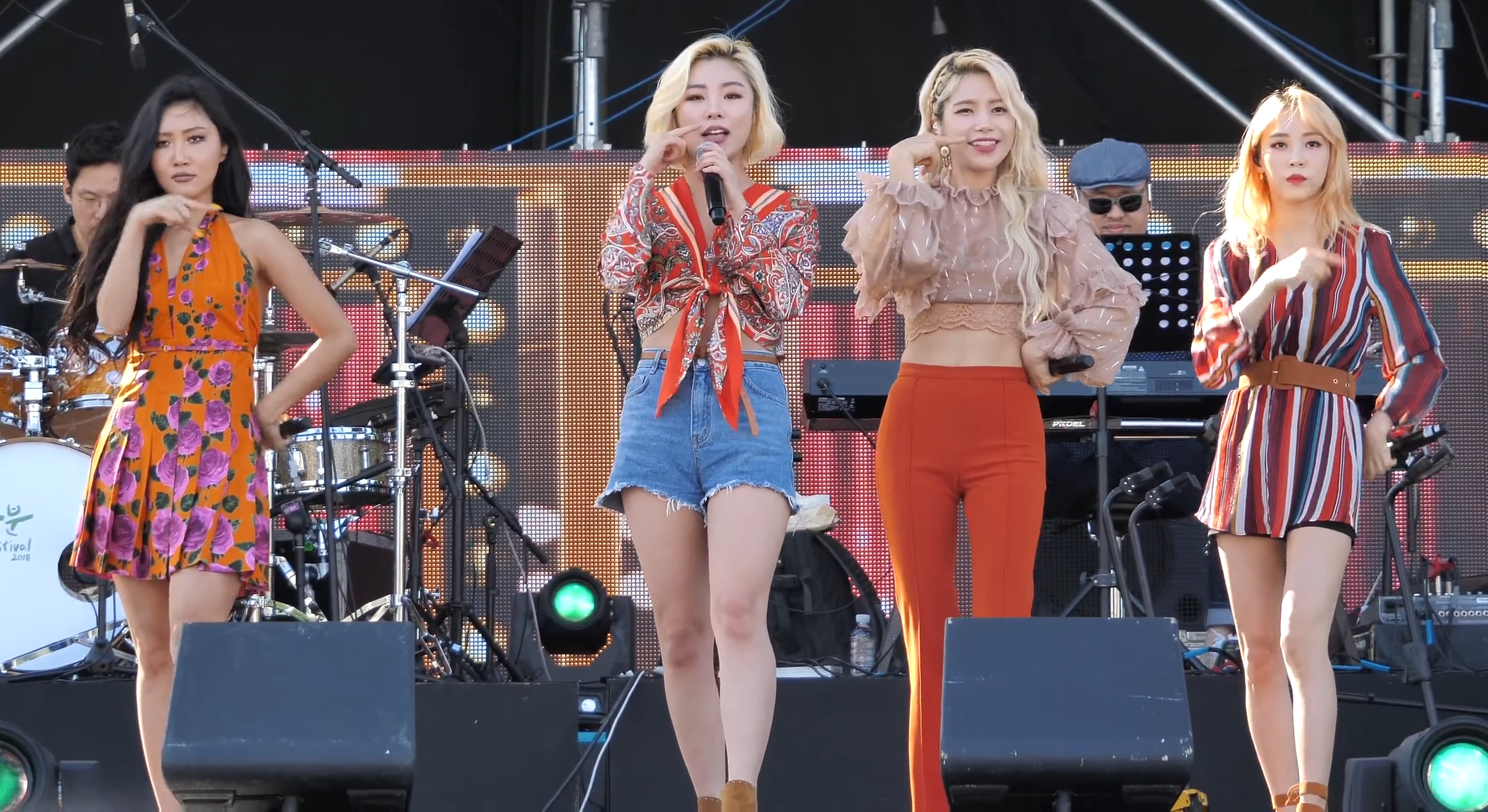
- Mamamoo performing in May 2018
Awards and nominations
Award	Wins	Nominations
APAN Music Awards	0	3
Asia Artist Awards	5	10
Asian Pop Music Awards	2	2
Brand Customer Loyalty Award	0	1
Bugs Music Awards	1	1
Cublic Media	1	1
Dong-A.com's Pick	1	1
The Fact Music Awards	4	5
Gaon Chart Music Awards	2	9
Genie Music Awards	1	13
Golden Disc Awards	4	16
Grimae Awards	1	1
Korea PD Awards	1	1
Korean Popular Music Awards	1	4
Melon Music Awards	3	24
MAMA Awards	5	29
MTV Europe Music Awards	0	1
Seoul Music Awards	4	23
Seoul Success Awards	1	1
Soribada Best K-Music Awards	6	11
V Live Awards	1	4

Totals (Note: Certain award groups do not simply award one winner. They acknowledge several different recipients, have runners-up, and have third place. Since this is a specific recognition and is different from losing an award, runner-up mentions are considered wins in this award tally. For simplification and to avoid errors, each award in this list has been presumed to have had a prior nomination.)
- Wins: 44
- Nominations: 161

This is a list of awards and nominations received by Mamamoo, a South Korean girl group formed in 2014 by Rainbow Bridge World. They have won various awards including 5 MAMA Awards, 3 Melon Music Awards, 4 Golden Disc Awards, 4 Seoul Music Awards and 6 Soribada Best K-Music Awards.

== Awards and nominations ==
Name of the award ceremony, year presented, category, nominee(s) of the award, and the result of the nomination
Award ceremony	Year	Category	Nominee(s)/work(s)	Result	Ref.
APAN Music Awards	2020	Idol Champ Global Pick – Group	Mamamoo	Nominated	
APAN Music Awards	2020	Top 10 (Bonsang)	Mamamoo	Nominated	
APAN Music Awards	2020	Best Music Video	Mamamoo	Nominated	
Asia Artists Awards	2016	Best Entertainer Award (Female Group Category)	Mamamoo	Won	
Asia Artists Awards	2016	Popularity Award (Music Category)	Mamamoo	Nominated	
Asia Artists Awards	2017	Best Icon Award (Music Category)	Mamamoo	Won	
Asia Artists Awards	2017	Popularity Award (Music Category)	Mamamoo	Nominated	
Asia Artists Awards	2018	Artist of the Year (Bonsang) (Music Category)	Mamamoo	Won	
Asia Artists Awards	2018	Best Music Award	Mamamoo	Won	
Asia Artists Awards	2018	Popularity Award (Music Category)	Mamamoo	Nominated	
Asia Artists Awards	2019	Popularity Award (Music Category)	Mamamoo	Nominated	
Asia Artists Awards	2019	Starnews Popularity Award (Female Group)	Mamamoo	Nominated	
Asia Artists Awards	2020	Best Artist Award (Music Category)	Mamamoo	Won	
Asian Pop Music Awards (Note: Hosted by the Hong Kong Asia Pacific International Group and Sunway Records, the Asian Pop Music Awards bases its winners on the "Asian Pop Music Chart" which opened in September 2019.)
Asian Pop Music Awards	2021	Top 20 Albums of the Year (Overseas)	WAW	Won	
Asian Pop Music Awards	2021	Top 20 Songs of the Year (Overseas)	"Where Are We Now"	Won	
Brand Customer Loyalty Award	2021	Best Female Idol Group	Mamamoo	Nominated	
Bugs Music Awards	2015	Idol of the Year	Mamamoo	Won	
Cublic Media	2016	SNS Communication	Mamamoo	Won	
Dong-A.com's Pick	2016	Trendy Word	Mamamoo	Won	
The Fact Music Awards	2018	Artist of the Year (Bonsang)	Mamamoo	Won	
The Fact Music Awards	2018	Best Performer	Mamamoo	Won	
The Fact Music Awards	2019	Artist of the Year (Bonsang)	Mamamoo	Won	
The Fact Music Awards	2020	Artist of the Year (Bonsang)	Mamamoo	Won	
The Fact Music Awards	2020	TMA Popularity Award	Mamamoo	Nominated	
Gaon Chart Music Awards	2014	New Artist of the Year	Mamamoo	Won	
Gaon Chart Music Awards	2016	Song of the Year – February	"You're the Best"	Won	
Gaon Chart Music Awards	2016	Song of the Year – February	"1cm (Taller Than You)"	Nominated	
Gaon Chart Music Awards	2016	Song of the Year – November	"Décalcomanie"	Nominated	
Gaon Chart Music Awards	2017	Song of the Year – June	"Yes I Am"	Nominated	
Gaon Chart Music Awards	2018	Song of the Year – March	"Starry Night"	Nominated	
Gaon Chart Music Awards	2018	Song of the Year – July	"Egotistic"	Nominated	
Gaon Chart Music Awards	2019	Artist of the Year – Digital Music (November)	"Hip"	Nominated	
Gaon Chart Music Awards	2020	Artist of the Year – Digital Music (October)	"Dingga"	Nominated	
Genie Music Awards	2018	Artist of the Year (Daesang)	Mamamoo	Nominated	
Genie Music Awards	2018	Female Group Award	Mamamoo	Nominated	
Genie Music Awards	2018	Genie Music Popularity Award	Mamamoo	Nominated	
Genie Music Awards	2018	Best Dance Performance (Female)	"Starry Night"	Nominated	
Genie Music Awards	2018	Song of the Year (Daesang)	"Starry Night"	Nominated	
Genie Music Awards	2018	Song of the Year (Daesang)	"Rainy Season"	Nominated	
Genie Music Awards	2018	Best Vocal Performance (Female)	"Rainy Season"	Nominated	
Genie Music Awards	2019	Artist of the Year (Daesang)	Mamamoo	Nominated	
Genie Music Awards	2019	Female Group Award	Mamamoo	Nominated	
Genie Music Awards	2019	Performing Artist (Female)	Mamamoo	Nominated	
Genie Music Awards	2019	The Vocal Artist	Mamamoo	Won	
Genie Music Awards	2019	Genie Music Popularity Award	Mamamoo	Nominated	
Genie Music Awards	2019	Global Popularity Award	Mamamoo	Nominated	
Golden Disc Awards	2016	Best Digital Song (Bonsang)	"You're the Best"	Won	
Golden Disc Awards	2016	Popularity Award	Mamamoo	Nominated	
Golden Disc Awards	2016	Asia Popularity Award	Mamamoo	Nominated	
Golden Disc Awards	2017	Best Digital Song (Bonsang)	"Yes I Am"	Nominated	
Golden Disc Awards	2017	Global Popularity Award	Mamamoo	Nominated	
Golden Disc Awards	2018	Best Digital Song (Bonsang)	"Starry Night"	Won	
Golden Disc Awards	2018	Popularity Award	Mamamoo	Nominated	
Golden Disc Awards	2018	NetEase Music Global Star Popularity Award	Mamamoo	Nominated	
Golden Disc Awards	2019	Best Digital Song (Bonsang)	"Gogobebe"	Nominated	
Golden Disc Awards	2019	Best Group	Mamamoo	Won	
Golden Disc Awards	2019	Popularity Award	Mamamoo	Nominated	
Golden Disc Awards	2019	NetEase Music Fans' Choice K-pop Star Award	Mamamoo	Nominated	
Golden Disc Awards	2020	Album Bonsang	"Travel"	Nominated	
Golden Disc Awards	2020	Curaprox Popularity Award	Mamamoo	Nominated	
Golden Disc Awards	2020	Best Digital Song (Bonsang)	"Hip"	Won	
Golden Disc Awards	2020	QQ Music Popularity Award	Mamamoo	Nominated	
Grimae Awards	2019	Best Entertainer Award	Mamamoo	Won	
Korea Producer Awards (Note: The Korea Producer Awards recognizes producing directors (PDs) and entertainers who have contributed to free press and the development of society and culture. On March 27, 2019, the Korean Producers & Directors Association revealed the winners for the 31st Korea Producer Awards. Winners of the Performer Awards include actor Choi Soo Jong, MAMAMOO, actor Kim Seung Woo, and more.)	2019	Performer Award (Singer category) - Daesang	Mamamoo	Won	
Korea Popular Music Awards (Note: The Korea Popular Music Awards were jointly established in 2018 by the Korea Singers Association, the Korea Entertainment Producer’s Association, the Recording Industry Association of Korea, the Federation of Korean Music Performers, and the Korea Music Copyright Association.)	2018	Bonsang Award	Mamamoo	Won	
Korea Popular Music Awards	2018	Song of the Year (Daesang)	"Starry Night"	Nominated	
Korea Popular Music Awards	2018	Artist of the Year (Daesang)	Mamamoo	Nominated	
Korea Popular Music Awards	2018	Popularity Award	Mamamoo	Nominated	
Melon Music Awards	2014	Best New Artist	Mamamoo	Nominated	
Melon Music Awards	2015	Best Female Dance	"Um Oh Ah Yeah"	Nominated	
Melon Music Awards	2016	Album of the Year (Daesang)	Melting	Nominated	
Melon Music Awards	2016	Song of the Year (Daesang)	"You're the Best"	Nominated	
Melon Music Awards	2016	Best Female Dance	"You're the Best"	Nominated	
Melon Music Awards	2016	Artist of the Year (Daesang)	Mamamoo	Nominated	
Melon Music Awards	2016	Top 10 Artist	Mamamoo	Won	
Melon Music Awards	2016	Netizen Popularity Award	Mamamoo	Nominated	
Melon Music Awards	2016	Kakao Hot Star Award	Mamamoo	Nominated	
Melon Music Awards	2017	Top 10 Artist	Mamamoo	Nominated	
Melon Music Awards	2017	Netizen Popularity Award	Mamamoo	Nominated	
Melon Music Awards	2017	Kakao Hot Star Award	Mamamoo	Nominated	
Melon Music Awards	2017	Best Female Dance	"Yes I Am"	Nominated	
Melon Music Awards	2018	Album of the Year (Daesang)	Yellow Flower	Nominated	
Melon Music Awards	2018	Song of the Year (Daesang)	"Starry Night"	Nominated	
Melon Music Awards	2018	Best Female Dance	"Starry Night"	Nominated	
Melon Music Awards	2018	Top 10 Artist	Mamamoo	Won	
Melon Music Awards	2018	Artist of the Year (Daesang)	Mamamoo	Nominated	
Melon Music Awards	2018	Netizen Popularity Award	Mamamoo	Nominated	
Melon Music Awards	2018	Kakao Hot Star Award	Mamamoo	Nominated	
Melon Music Awards	2019	Artist of the Year (Daesang)	Mamamoo	Nominated	
Melon Music Awards	2019	Top 10 Artist	Mamamoo	Won	
Melon Music Awards	2019	Netizen Popularity Award	Mamamoo	Nominated	
Melon Music Awards	2019	Best Female Dance	"Gogobebe"	Nominated	
MAMA Awards	2015	Song of the Year (Daesang)	"Um Oh Ah Yeah"	Nominated	
MAMA Awards	2015	Best Vocal Performance Female	"Um Oh Ah Yeah"	Nominated	
MAMA Awards	2016	Artist of the Year (Daesang)	Mamamoo	Nominated	
MAMA Awards	2016	Best Female Group	Mamamoo	Nominated	
MAMA Awards	2016	Song of the Year (Daesang)	"You're the Best"	Nominated	
MAMA Awards	2016	Best Vocal Performance Group	"You're the Best"	Nominated	
MAMA Awards	2017	Song of the Year (Daesang)	"Yes I Am"	Nominated	
MAMA Awards	2017	Best Vocal Performance Group	"Yes I Am"	Nominated	
MAMA Awards	2017	Artist of the Year (Daesang)	Mamamoo	Nominated	
MAMA Awards	2017	Best Female Group	Mamamoo	Nominated	
MAMA Awards	2018	Song of the Year (Daesang)	"Starry Night"	Nominated	
MAMA Awards	2018	Best Vocal Performance Group	"Starry Night"	Nominated	
MAMA Awards	2018	Artist of the Year (Daesang)	Mamamoo	Nominated	
MAMA Awards	2018	Worldwide Icon of the Year (Daesang)	Mamamoo	Nominated	
MAMA Awards	2018	Best Female Group	Mamamoo	Nominated	
MAMA Awards	2018	Worldwide Fans' Choice Top 10	Mamamoo	Won	
MAMA Awards	2018	Favorite Vocal Artist	Mamamoo	Won	
MAMA Awards	2019	Song of the Year (Daesang)	"Gogobebe"	Nominated	
MAMA Awards	2019	Best Vocal Performance Group	"Gogobebe"	Nominated	
MAMA Awards	2019	Artist of the Year (Daesang)	Mamamoo	Nominated	
MAMA Awards	2019	Best Female Group	Mamamoo	Nominated	
MAMA Awards	2019	Worldwide Fans' Choice Top 10	Mamamoo	Nominated	
MAMA Awards	2019	Favorite Vocal Artist	Mamamoo	Won	
MAMA Awards	2020	Best Female Group	Mamamoo	Nominated	
MAMA Awards	2020	Artist of the Year (Daesang)	Mamamoo	Nominated	
MAMA Awards	2020	Worldwide Fans' Choice Top 10	Mamamoo	Won	
MAMA Awards	2020	Song of the Year (Daesang)	"Hip"	Nominated	
MAMA Awards	2020	Best Vocal Performance – Group	"Hip"	Won	
MAMA Awards	2021	Worldwide Fans' Choice Top 10	Mamamoo	Nominated	
MTV Europe Music Awards	2017	Best Korean Act	Mamamoo	Nominated	
Seoul Music Awards	2014	Bonsang Award	"Mr. Ambiguous"	Nominated	
Seoul Music Awards	2014	New Artist Award	Mamamoo	Nominated	
Seoul Music Awards	2014	Popularity Award	Mamamoo	Nominated	
Seoul Music Awards	2014	Hallyu Special Award	Mamamoo	Nominated	
Seoul Music Awards	2015	Bonsang Award	"Um Oh Ah Yeh"	Nominated	
Seoul Music Awards	2015	Popularity Award	Mamamoo	Nominated	
Seoul Music Awards	2015	Hallyu Special Award	Mamamoo	Nominated	
Seoul Music Awards	2016	Bonsang Award	"You're the best"	Won	
Seoul Music Awards	2016	Popularity Award	Mamamoo	Nominated	
Seoul Music Awards	2016	Hallyu Special Award	Mamamoo	Nominated	
Seoul Music Awards	2017	Bonsang Award	"Yes, I Am"	Nominated	
Seoul Music Awards	2017	Popularity Award	Mamamoo	Nominated	
Seoul Music Awards	2017	Hallyu Special Award	Mamamoo	Nominated	
Seoul Music Awards	2017	TikTok Dance Performance Award	"Yes I Am"	Won	
Seoul Music Awards	2018	Bonsang Award	"Starry Night"	Won	
Seoul Music Awards	2018	Popularity Award	Mamamoo	Nominated	
Seoul Music Awards	2018	Hallyu Special Award	Mamamoo	Nominated	
Seoul Music Awards	2019	Bonsang Award	"White Wind"	Won	
Seoul Music Awards	2019	Popularity Award	Mamamoo	Nominated	
Seoul Music Awards	2019	Hallyu Special Award	Mamamoo	Nominated	
Seoul Music Awards	2020	Bonsang Award	"Dingga"	Nominated	
Seoul Music Awards	2020	K-Wave Popularity Award	Mamamoo	Nominated	
Seoul Music Awards	2020	Popularity Award	Mamamoo	Nominated	
Seoul Music Awards	2020	WhosFandom Award	Mamamoo	Nominated	
Seoul Success Awards	2014	Rookie of the Year	Mamamoo	Won	
Soribada Best K-Music Awards	2017	Bonsang Award	Mamamoo	Won	
Soribada Best K-Music Awards	2017	Daesang Award	Mamamoo	Nominated	
Soribada Best K-Music Awards	2017	Popularity Award	Mamamoo	Nominated	
Soribada Best K-Music Awards	2018	Bonsang Award	Mamamoo	Won	
Soribada Best K-Music Awards	2018	Popularity Award (Female)	Mamamoo	Won	
Soribada Best K-Music Awards	2018	Daesang Award	Mamamoo	Nominated	
Soribada Best K-Music Awards	2018	Global Fandom Award	Mamamoo	Nominated	
Soribada Best K-Music Awards	2019	Bonsang Award	Mamamoo	Won	
Soribada Best K-Music Awards	2019	Live Performance of the Year (Daesang)	Mamamoo	Won	
Soribada Best K-Music Awards	2019	Popularity Award (Female)	Mamamoo	Nominated	
Soribada Best K-Music Awards	2020	Bonsang Award	Mamamoo	Won	
V Live Awards	2019	Global Partnership Award	Mamamoo	Won	
V Live Awards	2019	Artist Top 10	Mamamoo	Nominated	
V Live Awards	2019	Best Channel – 1 million followers	Mamamoo	Nominated	
V Live Awards	2019	Global Artist Top 12	Mamamoo	Nominated	

== Other accolades ==
=== State honors ===
Name of country or organization, year given, and name of honor
Country or organization	Year	Honor	Ref.
South Korea (Note: Honors are given at the Korean Popular Culture and Arts Awards, arranged by the Korea Creative Content Agency and hosted by the Ministry of Culture, Sports and Tourism. They are awarded to those who have contributed to the arts and South Korea's pop culture.)	2019	Minister of Culture, Sports and Tourism Commendation	

=== Listicles ===
Name of publisher, year listed, name of listicle, and placement
Publisher	Year	Listicle	Placement	Ref.
Forbes	2019	Korea Power Celebrity	28th	
