= WAW (EP) =

EP by Mamamoo
- Released: June 2, 2021
- Genre: K-pop; ballad
- Label: RBW
- Producer: Kim Do-hoon

Mamamoo chronology
Travel (2020)	WAW (2021)	I Say Mamamoo: The Best (2021)

Singles from WAW
- 1. "Where Are We Now" Released: June 2, 2021

WAW (an acronym for Where Are We) is the eleventh extended play by South Korean girl group Mamamoo. The EP was released on June 2, 2021 by RBW and distributed by Kakao Entertainment. WAW follows their 2020 Korean top-five EP Travel and is the first part of the group's 'WAW (Where Are We)' project, set to consist of the new album, concert, and documentary about the group. It contains four new songs, including the lead single "Where Are We Now".

== Background and release ==
In 2020, Mamamoo had one group comeback, with the Travel EP in November, and focused mainly on the four members' solo activities for the majority of the year. The group announced their comeback with the 'Where Are We' project in May 2021, with the first teaser trailer posted on May 13, 2021. The EP was to be the first release since most of the members renewed their contracts with their label RBW and was promoted with the release of several more teaser videos and concept photos.

WAW was released in full on June 2, 2021. The Japanese edition of the EP was released on September 29, featuring the new song "Strange Day" and Japanese-language versions of their two 2021 singles "Where Are We Now" and "Mumumumuch".

== Commercial performance ==
WAW debuted at number five on the Gaon Album Chart, with nearly 40,000 copies sold on the Hanteo platform in its first day. The EP went on to debut at number six on the monthly chart for June 2021, with 130,680 copies sold. WAW ended the year as the Gaon Album Chart's 76th best-selling physical release, with 135,000 copies sold in that year. In Japan, the EP peaked at number 17 on the Oricon Albums Chart and 13 on the Billboard Japan Hot Albums chart following the release of the Japanese edition in September. It has since sold upwards of 5,200 copies in the region.

== Critical reception ==
=== Year-end lists ===
Select year-end rankings of WAW
Critic/Publication	Accolade	Rank	Ref.
Rolling Stone India	10 Best K-Pop Albums of 2021	9	

== Track listing ==
WAW track listing
No.	Title	Lyrics	Music	Arrangement	Length
1.	"Where Are We Now"	Kim Do-hoon (RBW); Cosmic Girl	Kim; Cosmic Girl; Lee Hoo-sang (RBW)	Kim; Lee	3:43
2.	"Another Day" (내일의 너, 오늘이 나)	Cocodooboopapa (RBW); Winsome; Hwang Sung-jin	Cocodooboopapa; Winsome	Cocodooboopapa; Winsome	4:04
3.	"A Memory for Life" (애써)	Jeon Da-woon (RBW); Cocodooboopapa; Moonbyul	Jeon; Cocodooboopapa	Jeon; Cocodooboopapa	3:33
4.	"Destiny Part.2" (우린 결국 다시 만날 운명이었지 Part.2)	Kim; Park Woo-sang (RBW)	Kim; Park	Mingkey (RBW)	3:04
Total length:					14:24

WAW: Japan Edition bonus tracks
No.	Title	Lyrics	Music	Arrangement	Length
5.	"Happier than Ever" (분명 우린 그때 좋았었어)	Kim; Cosmic Sound; Cosmic Girl; Moonbyul	Kim; Cosmic Sound; Cosmic Girl; Moonbyul	Cosmic Sound; Cosmic Girl; Kang Min-hoon (Aiming); Kwon Soo-hyun (Aiming)	3:48
6.	"Mumumumuch" (하늘 땅 바다만큼)	Kim; Cosmic Sound; Cosmic Girl; Moonbyul	Kim; Cosmic Sound; Cosmic Girl; Moonbyul	Cosmic Sound; Cosmic Girl	3:29
7.	"Where Are We Now" (Japanese version)	Kim; Cosmic Girl; Eri Osanai	Kim; Cosmic Girl; Lee	Kim; Lee	3:47
8.	"Mumumumuch" (Japanese version)	Kim; Cosmic Sound; Cosmic Girl; Moonbyul; Mio Jorakuji	Kim; Cosmic Sound; Cosmic Girl; Moonbyul	Cosmic Sound; Cosmic Girl	3:31
9.	"Strange Day"	Starbuck; Yhel; Moonbyul	Zaydro; Starbuck; Yhel	Zaydro; Starbuck; Yhel	3:18
Total length:					32:17

== Charts ==
=== Weekly charts ===
Chart (2021)	Peak position
Japanese Albums (Oricon)	17
Japanese Hot Albums (Billboard Japan)	13
South Korean Albums (Gaon)	5

=== Year-end charts ===
Chart (2021)	Position
South Korean Albums (Gaon)	76

== Release history ==
Region	Date	Format	Version	Label	Ref.
South Korea	June 2, 2021	CD	Standard	RBW; Kakao M	
Various	June 2, 2021	Digital download; streaming	Standard	RBW; Kakao M	
Japan	September 29, 2021	CD	Japanese	Victor Entertainment	
