= Mamamoo =

South Korean girl group

- Mamamoo in 2026; L–R: Wheein, Moonbyul, Solar, and Hwasa

Background information
- Origin: Seoul, South Korea
- Genres: K-pop; R&B; pop; dance
- Years active: 2014–present
- Labels: RBW; Victor
- Spinoffs: Mamamoo+
- Members: Solar; Moonbyul; Wheein; Hwasa
- Website: Official website

Mamamoo (Korean: 마마무; commonly stylized in all caps) is a South Korean girl group formed and managed by RBW. The group is composed of four members: Solar, Moonbyul, Wheein, and Hwasa. Known for their strong live vocals, harmonies, and writing much of their material, they are recognized as one of the premier girl groups in K-pop. They are highly regarded in the industry for their talent and ability to cross multiple genres with their music; from retro, jazz, and R&B concepts in their early years to more contemporary hip-hop, as well as emotional ballads. Since their debut in 2014, they have been noted for challenging conventional beauty standards, breaking gender stereotypes, and conducting themselves in ways that most typical K-pop stars do not. (Note: Supported by multiple sources:)

Mamamoo officially debuted on June 18, 2014, with their first extended play (EP) Hello, featuring the lead single "Mr. Ambiguous". Their debut was considered by critics as one of the best K-pop debuts of 2014. Mamamoo rose to domestic fame in 2015 with their single "Um Oh Ah Yeh", which became a sleeper hit and peaked at number three on the Gaon Digital Chart. Combined with their many appearances and victories on the music competition program Immortal Songs, this launched them into mainstream public recognition. Their popularity increased following the release of "You're the Best" from their debut studio album Melting (2016), which was a commercial success. In 2017, they made a splash on the international scene with their fifth EP, Purple. Its lead single "Yes I Am" earned them their first number one on the Billboard World Albums chart.

The quartet went on to achieve consecutive hits with the singles "Starry Night" (2018), "Egotistic" (2018), and "Gogobebe" (2019), from their "Four Seasons, Four Colors" project in which every member took turns in becoming the focus for each album. This culminated in their biggest international success to date, "Hip" from their second studio album Reality in Black (2019), becoming a number-one hit on the Billboard World Digital Song Sales chart. Their twelfth EP, Mic On (2022), was supported by the My Con World Tour (2022-2023), their first global concert tour. Following a period of reduced activity, the group returned in 2026 with the single "4 Flowers" and the 4ward World Tour.

Mamamoo has received numerous accolades, most notably the Golden Disc Award for Best Group, the Mnet Asian Music Award for Best Vocal Group, multiple honors at the Seoul Music Awards, as well as the Gaon Chart Music Award for New Artist of the Year in their rookie year.

== History ==
=== 2014–2015: Formation, debut and rising popularity ===
The group's name "Mamamoo" is intended to symbolize a baby babbling for the first time. This is because they aim to make music that would be familiar to everyone around the world like the word "mama" that babies would commonly first learn and speak of, as well as the added meaning of approaching their listeners instinctively with their music.

Prior to their official debut, Mamamoo collaborated with several artists. Their first collaboration, titled "Don't Be Happy" with Bumkey was released on January 8, 2014. A second collaboration with K.Will titled "Peppermint Chocolate" featuring Wheesung was released on February 11, 2014. "Peppermint Chocolate" debuted at number 10 on the Gaon Digital Chart in its first week. On May 30, 2014, Mamamoo released a collaboration single called "HeeHeeHaHeHo" with rap duo Geeks.

The group made their official debut on June 18, 2014, with the lead single "Mr. Ambiguous" from their first extended play (EP) Hello. The music video for "Mr. Ambiguous" contained cameo appearances from many well-known K-pop industry figures such as CNBLUE's Jonghyun, Baek Ji-young, Wheesung, Jung Joon-young, Bumkey, K.Will, and Rhymer of Brand New Music. The album contained three previously released collaborations and four new songs. The group made their first live appearance on the June 19 episode of M Countdown. In July 2014, Mamamoo released their first original soundtrack contribution titled "Love Lane" for the Korean drama Marriage, Not Dating.

On November 21, 2014, Mamamoo released their second EP Piano Man with the title track of the same name. The title song peaked at 41 on the Gaon Digital Chart. By the end of 2014, Mamamoo ranked tenth highest among idol girl groups for digital sales, 19th in album sales, and 11th in overall sales according to Gaon's year-end rankings. On January 10, 2015, Mamamoo performed a rendition of Joo Hyun-mi's "Wait a Minute" at the singing show Immortal Songs 2, reaching the final round before losing to Kim Kyung-ho.

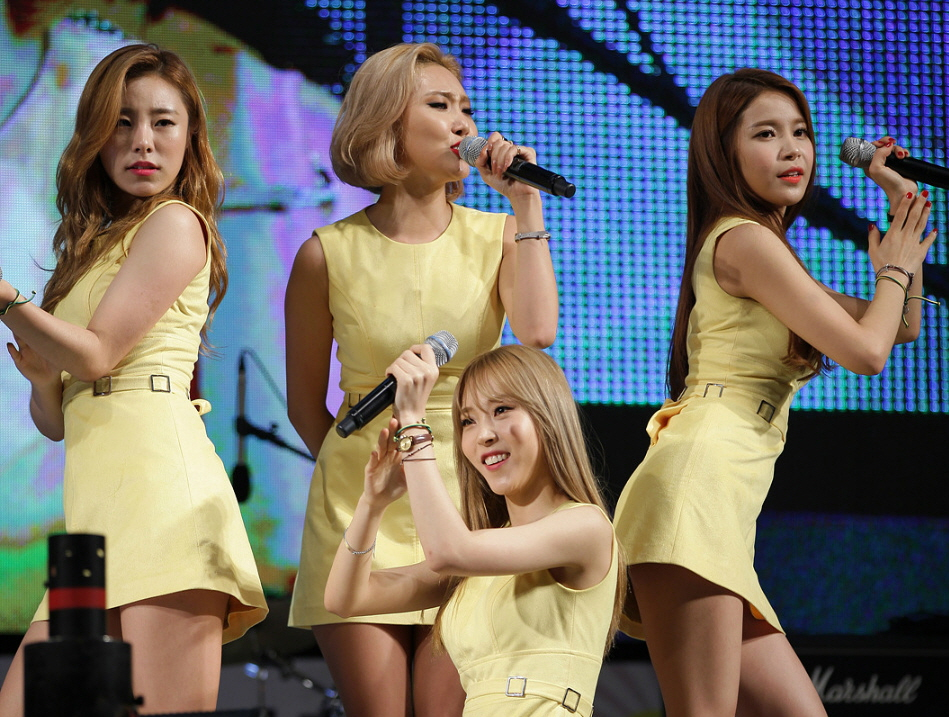
Mamamoo performing in September 2015

On April 2, 2015, Mamamoo released "Ahh Oop!", the first single of their third EP titled Pink Funky. "Ahh Oop!" marks the group's second collaboration with label mate Esna, after she was featured in "Gentleman" on their EP Piano Man. On June 13, 2015, the group traveled to Ulaanbaatar, Mongolia, to perform at an event sponsored by the South Korean Embassy with Crayon Pop and K-Much. The event was a commemorative concert held in honor of the 25th anniversary of diplomatic ties between South Korea and Mongolia.

On June 19, 2015, Mamamoo released their third EP Pink Funky, with the lead single "Um Oh Ah Yeh". The song was a commercial success, peaking at number three on the Gaon Chart, becoming their first top-three single. On August 23, 2015, after promotions concluded, Mamamoo held their first fan meeting, entitled "1st Moo Party", for a total of 1,200 fans at the Olympic Park in Seoul. Tickets for the fan meeting sold out within one minute, so the group added an additional meeting for 1,200 more fans the same night. They also held another "Moo Party" in Los Angeles, which took place on October 4, 2015. Mamamoo also collaborated and performed with label mate Basick on the Korean rap survival show Show Me the Money.

On August 29, 2015, Mamamoo performed a rendition of Jo Young-nam's "Delilah" on Immortal Song 2. On October 31, 2015, they returned to Immortal Song 2, singing a rendition of Korean trot singer Bae Ho's song "Backwood's Mountain" (두메산골). Their performance earned their first overall win on Immortal Song with 404 points.

=== 2016–2017: Breakthrough and subsequent EPs ===
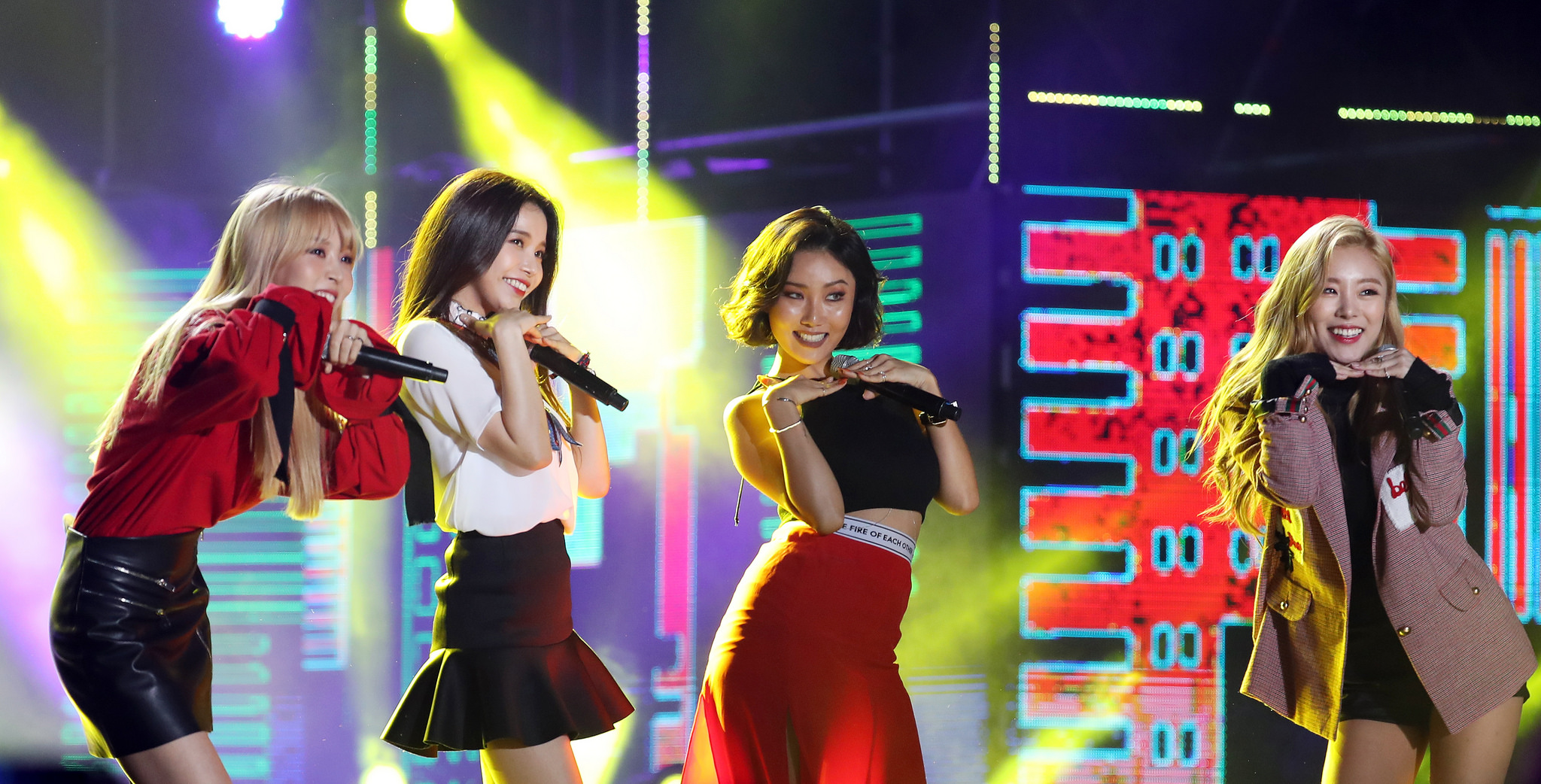
Mamamoo at the Korea Sale Festa Opening Ceremony on September 30, 2016.

On January 10, 2016, RBW announced Mamamoo's first solo concert since their debut in 2014. The concert, titled 2016 Mamamoo Concert-Moosical, was held on August 13–14, 2016, at the Olympic Hall in Seoul. 7,000 tickets for the concert were sold out in one minute.

On January 26, 2016, Mamamoo pre-released an R&B ballad, "I Miss You", from their first full-length album Melting. On February 12, 2016, another track, "1cm/Taller than You" was pre-released with a music video. The full album was released on February 26, 2016, debuting at number 3 on the Gaon Chart. The title track "You're the Best (넌 is 뭔들)" also debuted at number three and peaked at number one the following week, becoming their first number-one single. The song was a commercial success and charted on at least eight major music sites upon release.

On March 6, 2016, they received their first music show win with the song "You're the Best" on Inkigayo, followed by wins on Music Bank, M Countdown, and other music shows. They received eight wins in total for the single. On March 16, 2016, Mamamoo performed in Austin, Texas at South By Southwest's K-Pop Night Out.

On August 31, 2016, Mamamoo released the singles "Angel" and "Dab Dab" as subgroups consisting of vocalists (Solar and Wheein) and rappers (Moonbyul and Hwasa) respectively. On September 21, 2016, Mamamoo released their follow-up digital single "New York" and accompanying music video. After wrapping up promotions for "New York", RBW announced that the group would make their comeback on November 7 with their fourth EP Memory and the lead single "Décalcomanie". Shortly afterwards, Mamamoo participated in several year-end award shows, while also featuring in the OST titled "Love" for the TV show Goblin.

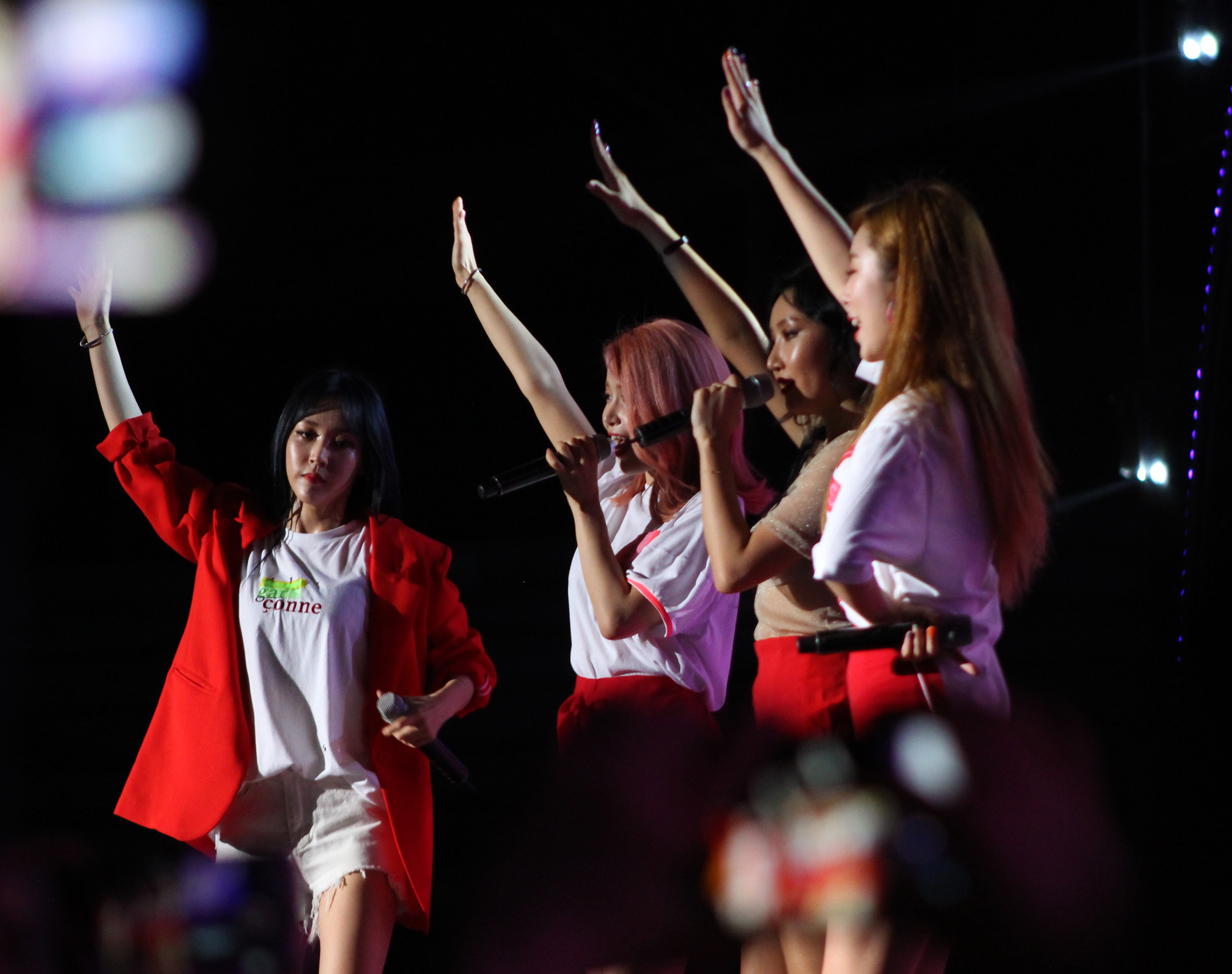
Mamamoo performing on July 19, 2017.

On January 19, 2017, Mamamoo announced their second solo concert titled 2017 Mamamoo Concert Moosical: Curtain Call, which was held on March 3–5, 2017 in Seoul and August 19–20, 2017 in Busan at KBS Busan Hall. Following the first show of their March 2017 concert in Seoul, Mamamoo received criticism for performing in blackface when, as part of the concert, they played a video containing the members impersonating Bruno Mars while wearing darker makeup, meant to recreate a snippet of the music video for Mars' "Uptown Funk" (2014). The clip was cut from following concert dates and multiple apologies were promptly issued, including one directly from the members, stating that they were "extremely ignorant of blackface and did not understand the implications of our actions. We will be taking time to understand more about our international fans to ensure this never happens again."

The group released their fifth EP Purple with the lead single "Yes I Am" on June 22, 2017. The single quickly climbed to the number one spot on the Melon real-time chart. After one day, Mamamoo set the record for the highest number of unique listeners in 24-hours with "Yes I Am" on Melon for a girl group. On June 27, 2017, the song received its first music show win on The Show, followed by wins on Show Champion, M Countdown, and Show! Music Core. Purple also peaked at number one on the Billboard World Albums chart.

=== 2018–2019: Widespread recognition, Japanese debut and member solo debuts ===
On January 4, 2018, Mamamoo released a single called "Paint Me" as a pre-release for their upcoming project series "Four Seasons, Four Colors". The goal of the series is to showcase four mini albums, each combining one color and a matching member's characteristic for each season. The group stated that they wanted to show their depth as artists and present a more mature style with the project.

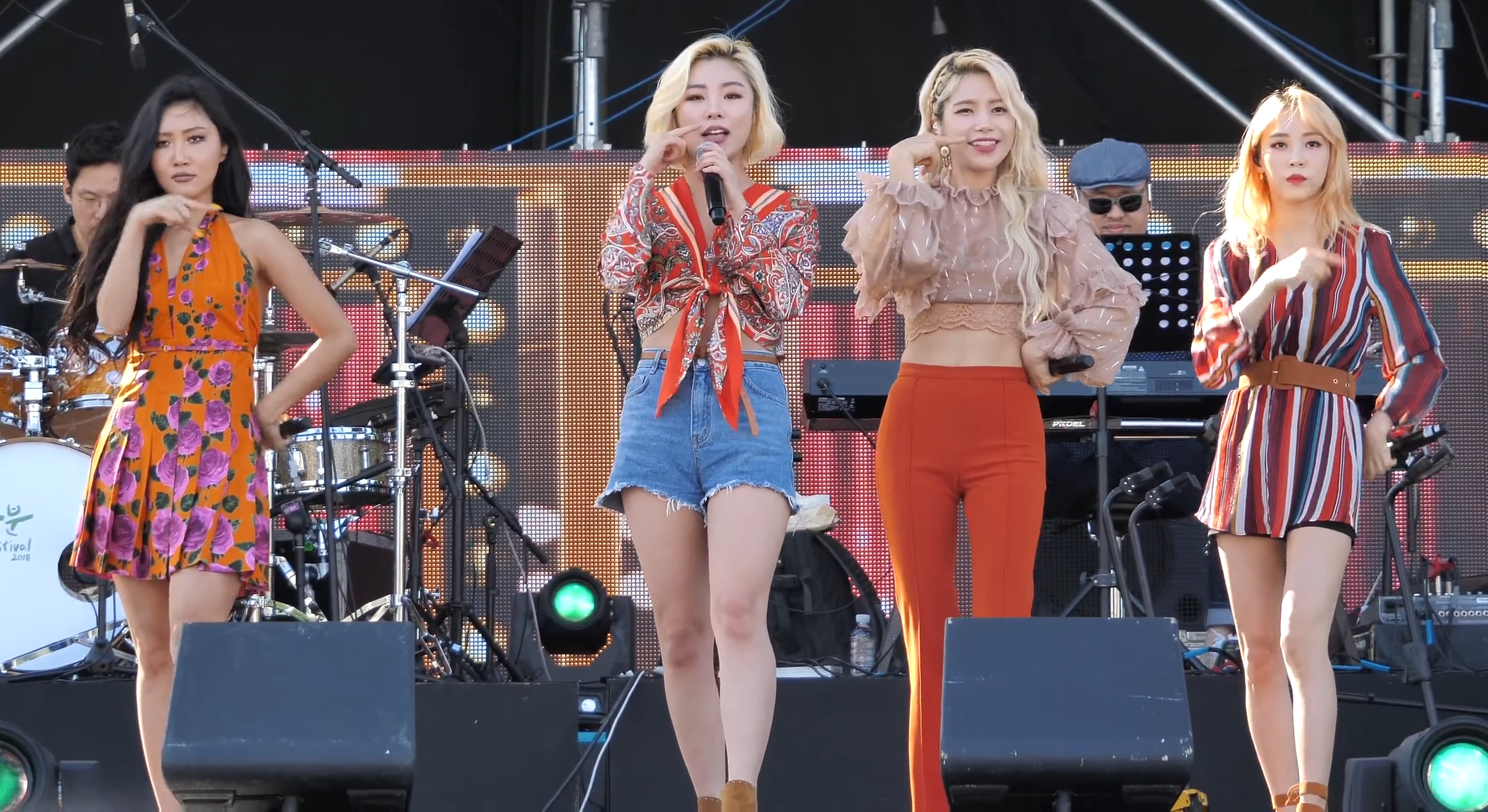
Mamamoo performing at the Holgabun Festival, May 2018

Mamamoo started off the "Four Seasons, Four Colors" project with the release of their sixth EP, Yellow Flower, on March 7. Yellow Flower debuted at number one on the Gaon Album Chart, becoming their first number-one album since their 2014 debut. The Latin-inspired and dance-pop song "Starry Night" was released alongside the album, with an accompanying music video. "Starry Night" debuted and peaked at number two on the Gaon Digital Chart, earning 44.7 million Gaon Index points in its debut week. It also ranked at number six on the mid-year and 13 on the year-end editions of the Gaon Digital Chart. The song earned the group their first music recording certification since the Gaon Music Chart and Korea Music & Content Association (KMCA) introduced certifications in April 2018; in November 2018, it was certified platinum for 100 million streams, and July 2019, it was certified platinum for 2.5 million paid digital downloads.

On July 1, Mamamoo released the single "Rainy Season" as the pre-release single from their upcoming album. "Rainy Season" peaked at number two on the Gaon Digital Chart, and was nominated for Best Female Vocal Performance at the 2018 Genie Music Awards. On July 16, the group released their seventh EP, Red Moon, as the second installment in the "Four Seasons, Four Colors" series. The EP debuted and peaked at number three on the Gaon Album Chart, with 38,000 copies sold in July 2018. The EP debuted at number four on the Billboard World Albums with 1,000 copies sold, marking their best U.S. sales week, and gave the group their first-ever appearance on the Billboard Heatseekers Albums Chart, entering the chart at number 25. The Latin-pop lead single "Egotistic", released alongside the EP, peaked at number four on the Gaon Digital Chart and the Billboard World Digital Songs Sales chart, earning the group their fifth top-ten entry on the latter chart.

On August 18–19, Mamamoo held their third headlining concert, titled "2018 Mamamoo Concert 4Seasons S/S", at the SK Olympic Handball Gymnasium in Seoul. Tickets for the concert were sold out within two minutes of being available for sale.

On October 3, Mamamoo released their debut Japanese single, the re-recorded Japanese version of their 2016 single "Décalcomanie", through Victor Entertainment. The CD and digital releases of the single also include the B-side "You Don't Know Me", a pop track that serves as their first original Japanese song. "Décalcomanie" peaked at number 11 on the weekly Oricon Singles Chart, with over 9,000 copies sold. On November 29, the group returned to the Korean-language market with their eighth EP Blue;S, the third installment of the "Four Seasons, Four Colors" series. Blue;S, which focuses on member Solar, peaked at number seven on the Gaon Album Chart. The lead single "Wind Flower" peaked at number nine on the Gaon Digital Chart. On February 6, 2019, the group released the Japanese version of "Wind Flower", alongside its b-side "Sleep Talk", as their second Japanese-language single. "Wind Flower" peaked at number 16 on the Oricon Singles Chart, selling 7,000 copies.

On March 14, 2019, Mamamoo released their ninth EP White Wind, with the lead single "Gogobebe", as the fourth and final installment of the "Four Seasons, Four Colors" project. White Wind debuted at number one on the Gaon Album Chart, selling nearly 60,000 physical copies by April 2019. "Gogobebe" also saw commercial success, peaking at number five on the Gaon Digital Chart and placing at number 72 on the yearly chart. The song also peaked at number two on both the Billboard Korea K-Pop Hot 100 and Billboard World Digital Songs Sales charts. On March 27, the group announced their fourth headlining concert, titled "2019 Mamamoo Concert 4Seasons F/W", which was held at Jangchung Gymnasium in Seoul on April 19–21. The concerts served as a grand finale for the "Four Seasons, Four Colors" project.

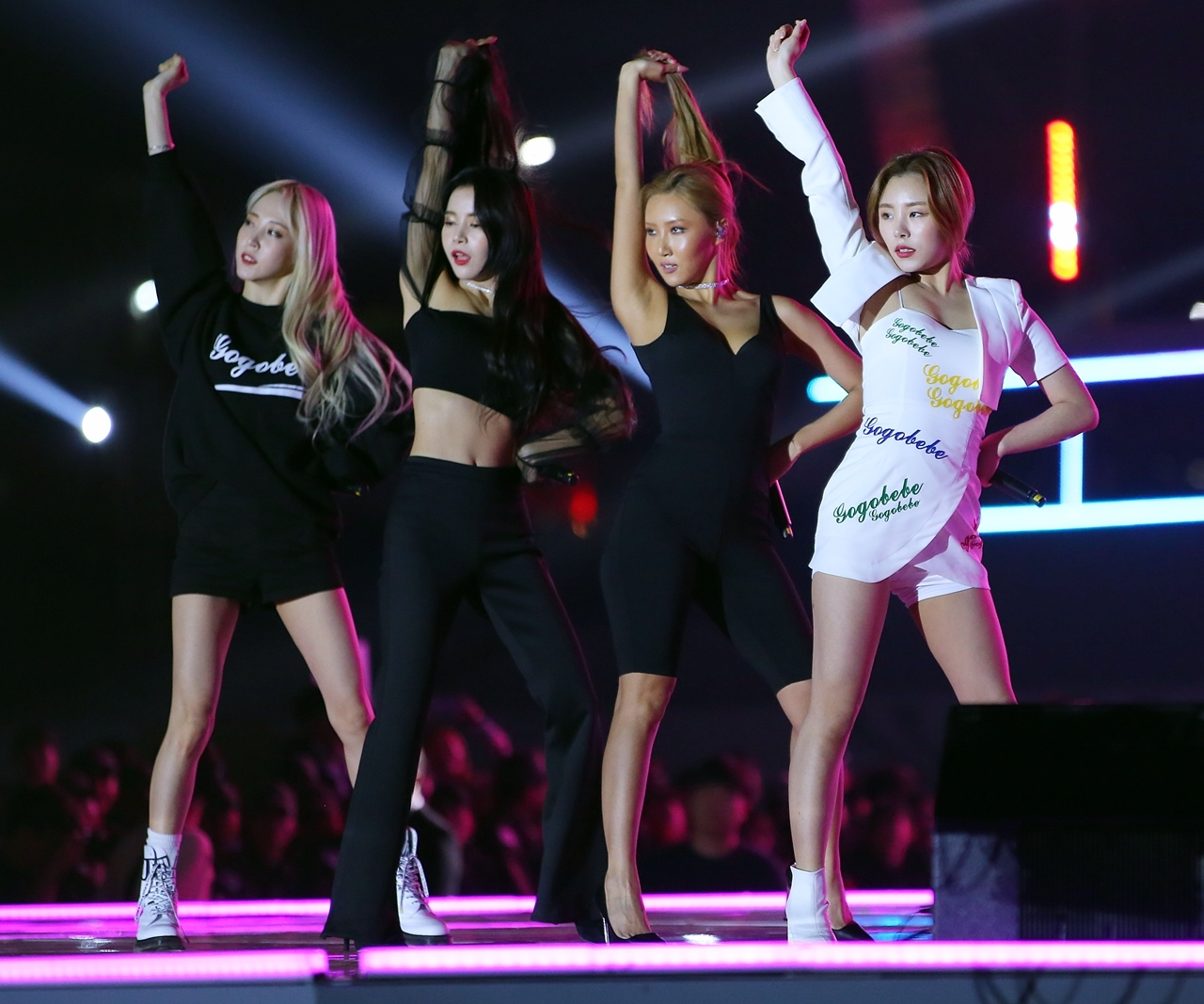
Mamamoo performing at the Chungcheongnam-do Provincial Sports Festival Opening Ceremony in May 2019

On July 24, Mamamoo released a new promotional single titled "Gleam" in collaboration with the brand Davich Eyeglasses. The dance and pop single saw minor success, peaking at number 89 on the Gaon Digital Chart and at number 15 on the Billboard World Digital Songs Sales chart.

In August 2019, Mamamoo was announced to be joining the Mnet reality-competition show Queendom as one of six teams. The show is a "comeback battle" between six trending girl group acts in order to "determine the real number one" when all six release their singles at the same time. Queendom premiered on August 26 and ran for ten total episodes, ending on October 31. During the show's finale, the group was crowned the winner of Queendom, thus earning the prize of a full-length comeback show to be broadcast on Mnet. As part of the show, Mamamoo released various songs, including a cover of AOA's 2016 hit "Good Luck" and their original finale song "Destiny".

Following their Queendom victory, Mamamoo released their second full album, Reality in Black, on November 14, 2019, with the lead single "Hip". Reality in Black debuted and peaked atop the Gaon Album Chart, while "Hip" peaked at number four on the Digital Chart. "Hip" also debuted at number five on the World Digital Songs Sales chart and peaked atop the chart in its second week, giving the group their very first number-one hit on the chart. On February 19, 2020, Mamamoo released their third Japanese song, "Shampoo", as a digital single. The song, along with the Japanese version of "Hip", is included in the Japanese edition of Reality in Black. The Japanese edition of the album was released on March 11 and peaked at number 27 on the Oricon Albums Chart with 2,500 copies sold. In November 2020, "Hip" was certified platinum by the Korea Music & Content Association (KMCA) for surpassing 100 million streams, making it their third time achieving this feat. The song also earned a gold certification from the Recording Industry Association of Japan (RIAJ).

=== 2020: Focus on members' solo activities and Travel ===
In January 2020, Kim Do-hoon, the CEO and executive producer of Mamamoo's record label RBW, stated that the members would begin to work more on solo projects in 2020. Moonbyul became the first member to release a solo project that year, releasing her debut EP Dark Side of the Moon on February 14. On April 23, Solar released her debut single "Spit It Out" and its accompanying single album. Following the single's debut at number 12 (and subsequent peak at number six), Mamamoo became the second Korean group in which every member had a solo song chart on Billboard's World Digital Song Sales chart.

Mamamoo released a promotional single, "Wanna Be Myself," on September 10. The "nostalgic" and "minimalist" music video was released in conjunction with the song itself and gained 3.8 million views in its first 24 hours of being released. The single peaked at number 93 on the Gaon Digital Chart and at number 11 on the Billboard World Digital Songs Sales chart.

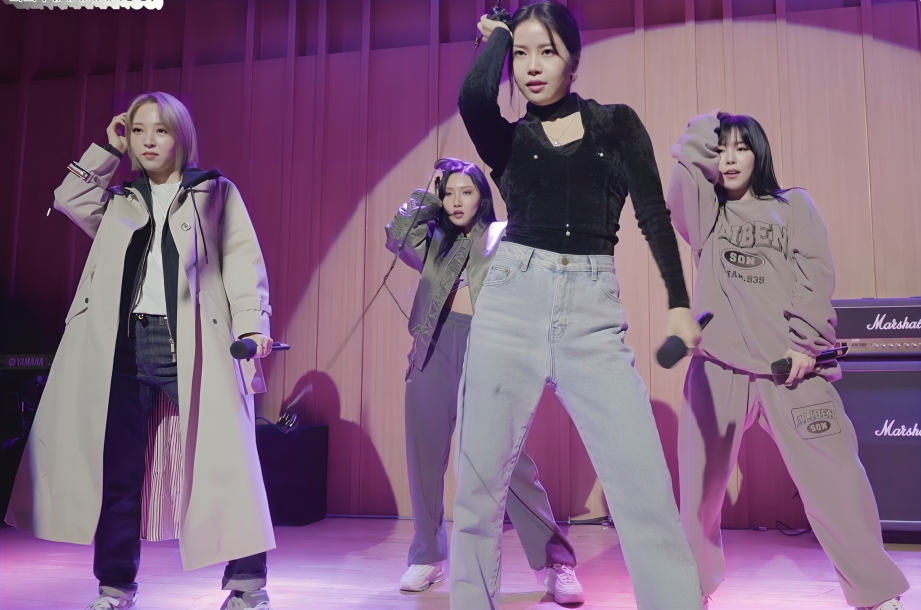
Mamamoo performing "Aya" in 2020

In October 2020, Mamamoo announced their tenth EP would be released in November. "Dingga" (딩가딩가), the first single from the EP, was pre-released on October 20. The disco-influenced pop song, characterized by themes of isolation and longing in the COVID-19 pandemic, was described by Teen Vogue as a "fun, chill" dance track accompanied by a "striking, retro-inspired music video to match." Led by a "simply melody line and funky vibes," the single earned top ten positions in South Korea and on the Billboard World Digital Songs Sales chart, and further charted in Singapore and Japan. The full EP, titled Travel, and its second single, "Aya", were released on November 3. Despite mixed reviews for its lack of cohesion, Travel peaked at number two on the Gaon Album Chart. The EP broke the group's personal sales records, selling a reported 100,000 copies in its first day and over 128,000 copies in its first week,and additionally topped iTunes charts in 29 countries. The second single from Travel, "Aya", was successful on streaming and peaked within the top 40 of the Gaon Digital Chart.

=== 2021–2023: Member contract renewals, WAW, Mamamoo+, Mic On, and first world tour ===
On January 22, 2021, RBW announced that Solar and Moonbyul had renewed their contracts with the agency, while Wheein and Hwasa were still discussing contract renewals. On March 30, Hwasa officially renewed her contract with RBW, with Wheein's contract remaining under discussion. RBW also confirmed that Mamamoo would stay together and was not planning to disband. On May 1, Mamamoo held a global virtual concert on live-streaming platform LIVENow, becoming the first South Korean music act to hold a concert on the platform.

Their eleventh EP, WAW, was released on June 2, along with the lead single "Where Are We Now". WAW topped iTunes albums charts in 21 countries worldwide, and it sold over 40,000 domestic copies in its first day of release, according to the Hanteo chart.

On June 11, RBW announced that Wheein would be leaving the company, and that she had chosen not to renew her solo contract with the agency. However, she signed a second contract extension to remain as a member of Mamamoo until at least December 2023. Thus, RBW remains responsible for her activities in the group but is no longer involved in her solo endeavors. On August 31, it was revealed that Wheein signed an exclusive solo contract with the agency THE L1VE.

A compilation album, titled I Say Mamamoo: The Best, was released alongside the lead single "Mumumumuch" on September 15. The album peaked at number eight on the Gaon Album Chart. On March 23, 2022, Mamamoo released the Japanese edition of The Best.

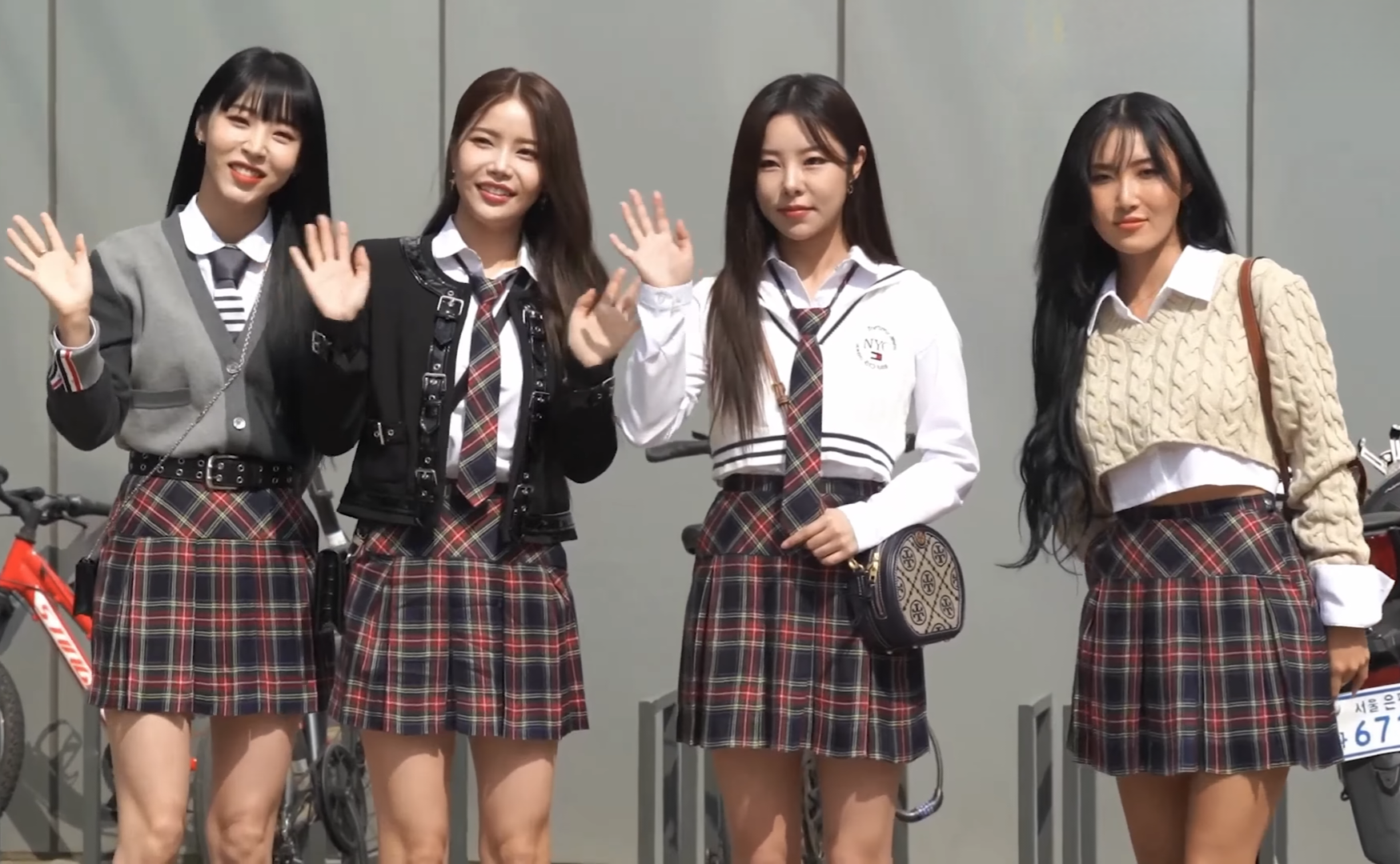
Mamamoo in 2022

In August 2022, it was announced that members Solar and Moonbyul would be forming the group's first official subunit, Mamamoo+, with an expected album release at the end of the month. The duo's debut single "Better", featuring rapper Big Naughty, was released on August 30. After six months, in March 2023, they released the single album Act 1, Scene 1, which includes the songs "GGBB" and "LLL", and on March 21 they released "Chico Malo" (나쁜놈), which mixes rap and traditional Korean instruments like gayageum.

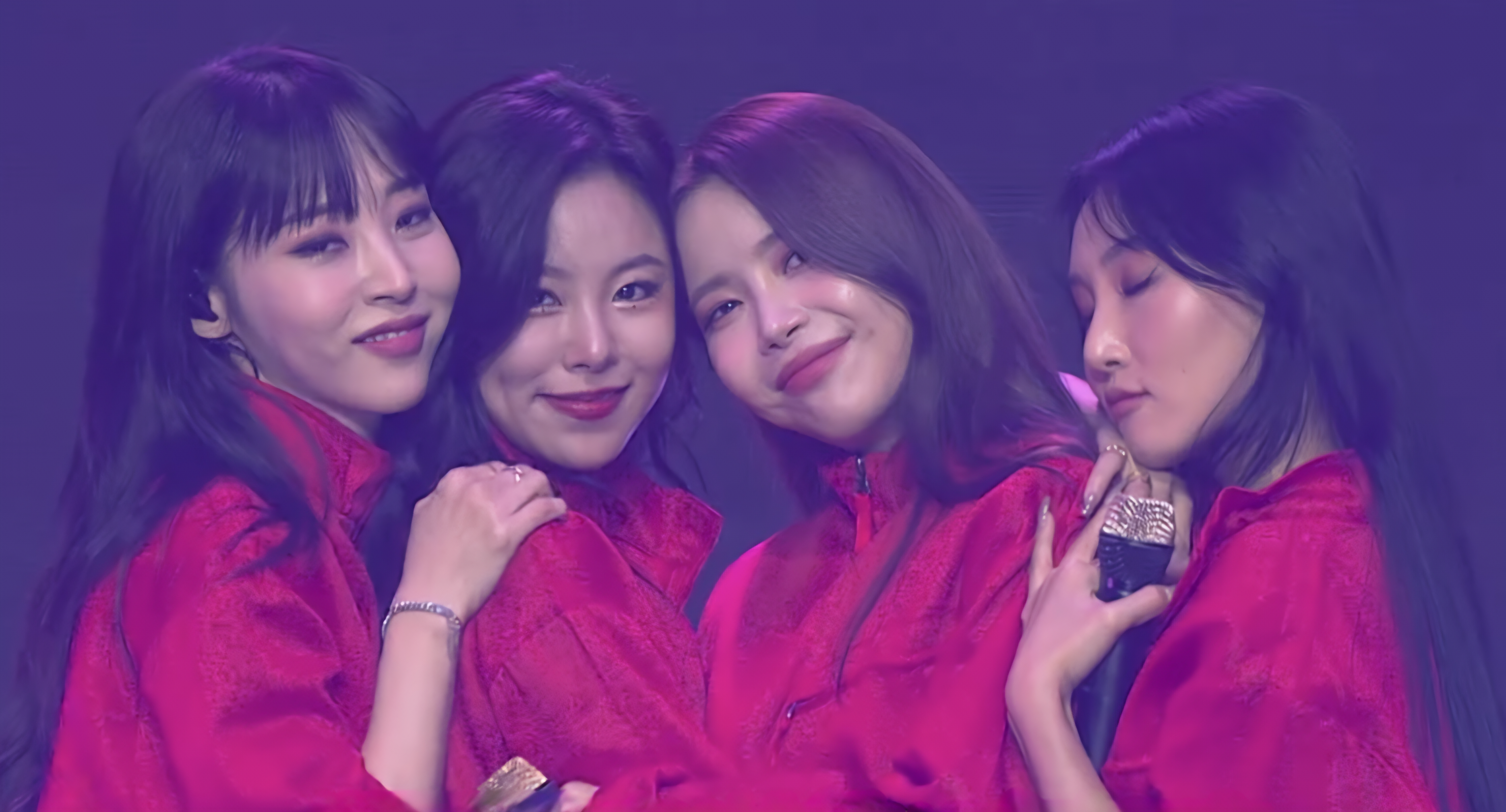
Mamamoo performing at their My Con World Tour in 2023

On October 11, 2022, Mamamoo released their twelfth EP titled Mic On and the lead single "Illella". To support the release, the group embarked on their first world tour, the My Con World Tour, starting on November 18 with three shows in Seoul. This was followed by the Asian leg of the tour with shows in Chiba, Hong Kong, Taipei, Bangkok, Jakarta, Singapore, Kuala Lumpur, and Manila. The United States leg of the tour commenced on May 16, 2023, with concerts in New York, Baltimore, Atlanta, Nashville, Fort Worth, Chicago, Glendale, Oakland, and Los Angeles. From June 16-18, they held encore concerts back in Seoul to close the tour.

=== 2024–present: Hiatus and return with 4ward ===
Following the release of Mic On and the conclusion of the tour, Mamamoo entered a hiatus while the members focused on their individual careers and side projects including Mamamoo+. As of February 25, 2024, the group is no longer listed under RBW's list of artists on their Korean website, despite being featured on a banner at the top of the web page, but still listed on RBW's Japanese website.

On June 26, 2024, Mamamoo uploaded a special video titled "10th Anniversary 'Mama No Plan'" (10주년 맞이 '마마無계획') on their YouTube channel to celebrate their 10th debut anniversary as a group.

On October 30, 2025, RBW confirmed to the media that Mamamoo was preparing for a full-group comeback, scheduled for June 2026, and that a world tour starting in Korea was also being planned. On December 31, 2025, RBW confirmed the group would release a full album in June 2026 and embark on a large-scale world tour.

Mamamoo performing at their 4ward World Tour in 2026

On April 3, 2026, Mamamoo announced the start of their global project by releasing the poster for the 4ward World Tour through their official social media. The tour was confirmed to begin in Seoul on June 19, on their 12th debut anniversary. On May 11, RBW announced that Mamamoo would hold the first concerts of the 2026 world tour at the Olympic Hall in Olympic Park, Songpa-gu, Seoul from June 19 to 21. On May 21, Mamamoo announced that the special single "4ward" would be released on June 4, marking their first comeback in over three years. At the 2026 MAMA Awards, "4 Flowers" received a nomination for Best Vocal Performance – Group.

== Members ==
- Solar (솔라)
- Moonbyul (문별)
- Wheein (휘인)
- Hwasa (화사)

== Discography ==
Korean albums

- Melting (2016)
- Reality in Black (2019)

Japanese albums

- 4colors (2019)
- Reality in Black - "Japanese edition" (2020)

== Tours and concerts ==
=== World tours ===
- My Con World Tour (2022–2023)
- 4ward World Tour (2026)

=== Concert tours ===
- Mamamoo Concert: 4Season S/S (2018)
- Mamamoo 1st Concert Tour in Japan (2018)
- Mamamoo Concert: 4Season F/W (2019)
- Mamamoo 2nd Concert Tour in Japan: 4season Final (2019)

=== Concerts ===
- Mamamoo Concert 'Moosical' (2016)
- Mamamoo Concert 'Moosical: Curtain Call' (2017)

== Filmography ==
=== Reality shows ===
Year	Title	Notes	Ref.
2016	Mamamoo x GFriend Showtime		
2018	A Lucky Day		
2019	Queendom	Won	
2020	MooMoo Trip		
2020	Boss in the Mirror	Ep.81–85	
2022	Mamamoo - Where Are We Now	Documentary	
2022	Take 1	Participant; New concept song list	

=== Television series ===
Year	Title	Role	Ref.
2016	Entourage	Themselves (episode 1)	

=== Films ===
Year	Title	Description	Ref.
2023	Mamamoo: My Con the Movie	Documentary and concert film	

== Awards and nominations ==
Since their 2014 debut, Mamamoo has received five Mnet Asian Music Awards and Asia Artist Awards respectively, four Golden Disc Awards, Seoul Music Awards and The Fact Music Awards respectively. A total of 44 awards out of 161 nominations.

== See also ==
- List of best-selling girl groups
