= I Say Mamamoo: The Best =

Compilation album by Mamamoo
- Released: September 15, 2021
- Genre: K-pop
- Label: RBW

Mamamoo chronology
WAW (2021)	I Say Mamamoo: The Best (2021)	Mic On (2022)

Singles from I Say Mamamoo: The Best
- 1. "Mumumumuch" Released: September 15, 2021

I Say Mamamoo: The Best (stylized in all caps), sometimes referred to as The Best, is the first compilation album by South Korean girl group Mamamoo. It was released on September 15, 2021 by RBW. The album features 23 tracks, including remixes and re-recorded versions of some of the group's biggest hits. It includes two original tracks, "Mumumumuch" and "Happier Than Ever," with the former being released as the lead and only official single from the album alongside the release of the album itself.

== Background and release ==
Following the release of their eleventh EP WAW in June 2021 and their online concert of the same name in August, reports emerged that Mamamoo were preparing a greatest hits album to be released in September. The album, which would mark the first group release after member Wheein declined to renew her contract with record label RBW, was to celebrate seven years as a group. In early September, the group confirmed the album's title, cover, and release date through their social media. I Say Mamamoo: The Best was released in full on September 15, 2021. The Japanese version of the album was released on March 23, 2022.

== Promotion ==
Prior to the album's release, Mamamoo performed the two new original songs, "Mumumumuch" and "Happier Than Ever," during their August 2021 online concert, alongside several of the 2021 remix versions included on the album. Compared to their other albums, The Best received minimal promotions and the group opted to not perform on South Korean music programs, as the album was considered a gift to fans rather than an official comeback.

=== Single ===
"Mumumumuch" was released as the album's lead and only single on September 15, 2021, coinciding with the release of the album itself. The song is a "dance-pop track with a rhythmical bass line that describes just how much they love someone and how having those feelings makes them shine as well." It also "expresses love for their fans and was included in the compilation album as a special gift." In the music video, released on September 15, the four members of Mamamoo "spend quality time together in a lavish hotel suite, where they have drinks, cakes and more" and "perform at a resort, overlooking vibrant purple hills," as per NME.

== Critical reception ==
Puah Ziwei of NME described the compilation as a rarity for K-pop groups but maintained that Mamamoo executed the album's concept well, saying that it "largely lives up to the group's legacy." He dubbed the rock version of their 2019 single "Gogobebe" a stand-out track, though he stated that the two new tracks felt "par for the course for K-pop in the 2020s" and "might be viewed in a slightly more positive light" had they been released as standalone singles. On the review aggregator Album of the Year, I Say Mamamoo: The Best holds a user score of 64.

== Commercial performance ==
I Say Mamamoo: The Best recorded 6,981 sales on its first day of release, a figure much smaller than the group's previous 2021 release WAW, which recorded nearly 40,000 first-day sales. Due to the success of the album on digital platforms, fans of the group blamed the group's label, RBW, for not being able to print enough copies of the album to keep up with demand, leading to it quickly selling out on various retailers, though the company made no statement on the matter. The album went on to debut at number eight on the Gaon Album Chart for the 38th issued week of 2021, making it their 14th top-ten album. On the monthly album chart for September 2021, the album placed at number 25, selling 29,996 physical copies; it dropped one place to number 26 for the month of October, with 29,159 copies sold for a total of 59,155 copies. As of December 2022, the album has generated more than 37 million streams on music streaming platform Spotify and more than four million streams on YouTube Music.

The album's lead single "Mumumumuch" debuted and peaked at number 102 on the Gaon Digital Chart and number eight on the Gaon Download Chart, with each of the 23 tracks from The Best entering the Download Chart as well.

== Track listing ==
I Say Mamamoo: The Best – Standard Edition
No.	Title	Lyrics	Music	Producer(s)	Length
1.	"Mumumumuch" (하늘 땅 바다만큼)	Kim Do-hoon; Cosmic Sound; Cosmic Girl; Moonbyul	Cosmic Sound; Cosmic Girl	Cosmic Sound; Cosmic Girl	3:29
2.	"Happier Than Ever" (분명 우린 그땐 좋았었어)	Kim Do-hoon; Cosmic Sound; Cosmic Girl; Moonbyul	Kim Do-hoon; Cosmic Sound; Cosmic Girl; Moonbyul	Cosmic Sound; Cosmic GirlKang Min-hoon (AIMING); Kwon Soo-hyun (AIMING)	3:48
3.	"Paint Me (Orchestral Version)" (칠해줘)	Dr. JO; Moonbyul	Mich Hansen; Peter Wallevik; Daniel Davidsen; Chelcee Grimes; Kara DioGuardi	Mich Hansen; Peter Wallevik; Daniel Davidsen; Chelcee Grimes; Kara Diogaurdi; Lee Hoo-sang	3:24
4.	"Starry Night (Orchestral Version)" (별이 빛나는 밤)	Kim Do-hoon; Park Woo-sang; Moonbyul	Kim Do-hoon; Park Woo-sang	Lee Hoo-sang	3:34
5.	"Gogobebe (Rock Version)" (고고베베)	Kim Do-hoon; Solar; Moonbyul	Kim Gun-mo; Kim Do-hoon	Jin Min-ho	3:40
6.	"Egotistic (Blistering Sun Version)" (너나 해)	Kim Do-hoon; Park Woo-sang	Kim Do-hoon; Park Woo-sang	Lee Hoo-sang; Lim Hyun-gi	3:31
7.	"You're the Best 2021" (넌 is 뭔들)	Kim Do-hoon; Park Woo-sang; Moonbyul	Kim Do-hoon; Duble Sidekick	Kim Do-hoon; Choi Yong-chan; Lim Hyun-gi	4:30
8.	"I Miss You 2021"	Cosmic Sound; Hwang Yoo-bin; Moonbyul	Kim Do-hoon	Lee Hoo-sang; Lim Hyun-gi	4:24
9.	"HeeHeeHaHeHo Part.2" (히히하헤호)	Kim Do-hoon; eSNa; Moonbyul; Hwasa	Kim Do-hoon; eSNa	Kim Do-hoon	3:54
10.	"Words Don't Come Easy 2021" (우리끼리)	Kim Do-hoon; Park Woo-sang; eSNa	Kim Do-hoon; Park Woo-sang	Park Woo-sang; Choi Yong-chan	3:55
11.	"Piano Man 2021"	Kim Eana; Moonbyul	Kim Do-hoon; eSNa	Kim Do-hoon; Choi Yong-chan; Lim Hyun-gi	3:48
12.	"Ahh Oop 2021"	eSNa; Moonbyul	eSNa	Choi Yong-chan	3:23
13.	"Decalcomanie 2021" (데칼코마니)	Kim Do-hoon; Solar; Moonbyul; Hwasa	Kim Do-hoon; eSNa	Kim Do-hoon; Mingkey; Lim Hyun-gi	4:13
14.	"Aya (Traditional Version)"	Kim Do-hoon; Lee Sang-ho; Moonbyul	Kim Do-hoon; Lee Sang-ho; Moonbyul	Kim Do-hoon; Lee Sang-ho; Mingkey	3:29
15.	"Hip (Remix Version)"	Kim Do-hoon; Park Woo-sang; Hwasa	Kim Do-hoon; Park Woo-sang; eSNa	Kim Do-hoon; Park Woo-sang; Lee Hoo-sang	4:30
16.	"A Little Bit 2021" (따끔)	Hwang Sung-jin; Kim Chang-reok; Lee Eun-ji; Moonbyul	Kim Do-hoon; Park Woo-sang	Kim Chang-reok	3:50
17.	"Wind Flower (Dramatic Version)"	Kim Do-hoon; Park Woo-sang; Moonbyul	Kim Do-hoon; Park Woo-sang	Kim Do-hoon; Park Woo-sang; Lee Hoo-sang; Mingkey	4:34
18.	"Um Oh Ah Yeh 2021" (음오아예)	Kim Do-hoon; Solar; Moonbyul; Hwasa	Kim Do-hoon	Choi Yong-chan; Lim Hyun-gi	4:20
19.	"Don't Be Happy 2021" (행복하지마)	eSNa; Moonbyul	eSNa	Kim Do-hoon	2:57
20.	"Peppermint Chocolate (MMM Version)" (썸남썸녀)	Kim Eana; Wheesung	Kim Do-hoon; eSNa	Lee Sang-ho	3:31
21.	"Destiny (Extended Version)" (우린 결국 다시 만날 운명이었지)	Kim Do-hoon; Park Woo-sang	Kim Do-hoon; Park Woo-sang	Kim Do-hoon; Park Woo-sang; Lee Hoo-sang	4:40
22.	"Mr. Ambiguous 2021" (Mr.애매모호)	Min Yeon-jae; Louie	Kim Do-hoon	Kim Do-hoon; Choi Yong-chan	3:48
23.	"Yes I Am (Funk Boost Version)" (나로 말할 것 같으면)	Kim Do-hoon; Solar; Moonbyul; Hwasa	Kim Do-hoon	Kim Do-hoon; Choi Yong-chan	3:48
Total length:					1:28:51

I Say Mamamoo: The Best – Japanese edition (CD3 / Digital)
No.	Title	Length
1.	"Décalcomanie" (Japanese Version)	3:38
2.	"You Don't Know Me"	3:44
3.	"Wind Flower" (Japanese version)	3:55
4.	"Sleep Talk"	3:08
5.	"Starry Night" (Japanese version)	3:33
6.	"Egotistic" (Japanese version)	3:18
7.	"Gogobebe" (Japanese version)	3:17
8.	"Nada Sousou" (涙そうそう)	4:16
9.	"Hip" (Japanese version)	3:16
10.	"Shampoo"	3:18
11.	"Aya" (Japanese version)	3:33
12.	"Dingga" (Japanese version)	3:01
13.	"Just Believe in Love"	2:48
14.	"Where We Are Now" (Japanese version)	3:47
15.	"Mumumumuch" (Japanese version)	3:31
16.	"Strange Day"	3:18
17.	"Smile"	3:04
Total length:		58:31

== Charts ==
=== Weekly charts ===
Weekly chart performance for I Say Mamamoo: The Best
Chart (2021)	Peak position
Japanese Albums (Oricon)	43
Japan Hot Albums (Billboard Japan)	87
South Korean Albums (Gaon)	8

=== Monthly charts ===
Monthly chart performance for I Say Mamamoo: The Best
Chart (2021)	Peak position
South Korean Albums (Gaon)	25

== Release history ==
Region	Date	Format	Label	Ref.
Various	September 15, 2021	CD; digital download; streaming	RBW; Kakao M	
