= Illella =

2022 single by Mamamoo

Single by Mamamoo

from the EP Mic On
- Language: Korean
- Released: October 11, 2022
- Recorded: 2022
- Studio: RBW Studio
- Genre: K-pop; reggaeton
- Label: RBW
- Composers: Kim Do-hoon; Kang Ji-won; Moonbyul; Inner Child (MonoTree)
- Lyricists: Kim Do-hoon; Kang-Ji-won; Yoo Joo-yi; Moonbyul; Inner Child (MonoTree)

Mamamoo singles chronology
"Mumumumuch" (2021)	"Illella" (2022)	"4 Flowers" (2026)

Music video
- "Illella" on YouTube

"Illella" (Korean: 일낼라; lit. 'get up' (Note: "일낼라" is also an expression that can be used to mean "to cause trouble" or "to do something great". In the context of the song, it means "something's about to break."); occasionally stylized as "1llella") is a song by South Korean girl group Mamamoo. It was released through RBW and Kakao Entertainment on October 11, 2022, as the lead single from their twelfth extended play Mic On. It was co-written by Moonbyul, Yoo Joo-yi, Kang Ji-won, Kim Do-hoon, and Inner Child, the latter three of whom also handled the song's production. Described as a K-pop and reggaeton track, it was met with positive reviews from critics who praised the group for their vocal harmonies.

== Background and release ==
On June 20, 2022, Mamamoo's label RBW confirmed that the group was scheduled to have a comeback with a group album in the latter half of the year with a concert to follow. That August, Mamamoo members Solar and Moonbyul formed the group's first sub-unit, Mamamoo+. Their first single, "Better" featuring Big Naughty, was released on August 28. On September 27, the group officially announced their comeback with their 12th mini-album Mic On, scheduled for release on October 11. The first teaser video for the song was released on YouTube on October 5. "Illella" was released at 6PM KST on October 11, 2022.

== Critical reception ==
Divyansha Dongre of Rolling Stone India described it as a reggaeton track that beautifully fuses rich brass sounds with guitar riffs. They further commented "It’s a near-perfect soundscape to underline Mamamoo’s vocal prowess that has helped cement their identity as one of K-pop’s leading girl groups". Writing for Billboard, Jeff Benjamin said “Illella” is a full-fledged reminder of their commanding vocal deliveries and artistic auras, that serves powerful belts and sleek harmonies". For NME, Gladys Yeo described it as a reggae-inspired track, that sees the girl group dress in festival-inspired outfits". Pinkvilla described it "as an exotic song with a reggae tone that is impressive with thick brass and repetitive guitar riffs". Apple Music would later include the song on their A-List: K-Pop 2022 playlist of the 50 best K-pop songs of 2022.

== Commercial performance ==
For the 42nd week of 2022, "Illella" debuted and peaked at number 66 on the Circle Digital Chart. On the Circle Global K-Pop Chart, which measures worldwide K-pop streaming consumption, "Illella" debuted at number 51 for the week ending October 15, 2022; it peaked at number 38 in its second week on the chart.

In the United States, "Illella" debuted at number five on the Billboard World Digital Song Sales chart for the issue dated October 22, 2022, spending two weeks on the chart. The song also peaked at number 30 in Singapore and at number 27 in Hungary, becoming their first song to reach the charts in the latter territory.

== Credits and personnel ==
Adapted from the group's official Twitter.

- Mamamoo – lead vocals
  - Moonbyul – songwriting, composition
- Kim Do-hoon (RBW) – songwriting, composition
- Kang Ji-won – songwriting, composition, arrangement
- Yoo Joo-yi (Note: Also known as "Cosmic Girl" (코스믹 걸).) – songwriting
- Inner Child (MonoTree) – songwriting, composition

== Charts ==
=== Weekly charts ===
Weekly chart performance for "Illella"
Chart (2022)	Peak position
Hungary (Single Top 40)	27
Singapore (RIAS)	30
South Korea (Circle)	66
US World Digital Song Sales (Billboard)	5

=== Monthly charts ===
Monthly chart performance for "Illella"
Chart (2022)	Peak position
South Korea (Circle)	108

== Release history ==
Release history for "Illella"
Region	Date	Format	Label	Ref.
Various	October 11, 2022	Digital download; streaming	RBW	
