= Mic On =

EP by Mamamoo
- Released: October 11, 2022
- Studio: RBW (Seoul)
- Length: 8:40
- Language: Korean
- Label: RBW

Mamamoo chronology
I Say Mamamoo: The Best (2021)	Mic On (2022)	4ward (2026)

Singles from Mic On
- 1. "Illella" Released: October 11, 2022

Professional ratings
Review scores
Source	Rating
NME	4/5 stars

Mic On is the twelfth extended play (EP) by South Korean girl group Mamamoo. It was released on October 11, 2022, through RBW. The EP consists of three tracks, including the lead single "Illella".

== Composition ==
Mic On contains three songs. The EP opens with "1,2,3 Eoi!", a "masterful" track incorporating electronic and hip-hop elements, with the group's vocals, it adds a smooth, jazzy texture that complements the vocals in the chorus. Followed with the title track "Illella", it opens with "bright" ad libs and "rich" vocals over a powerful reggaeton instrumental mixed with guitar riffs and "resounding percussion" in its arrangement. The closing track "L.I.E.C." is a nu-disco song, NME noted that the song is similar in its production to the group's single "Um Oh Ah Yeh".

== Track listing ==
Mic On track listing
No.	Title	Lyrics	Music	Arrangement	Length
1.	"1, 2, 3 Eoi!" (하나둘셋 어이!)	Kim Do-hoon (RBW); Kim Min-gi (RBW); Inner Child (MonoTree); Solar; Moonbyul	Kim D.; Kim M.; Moonbyul; Inner Child	Kim M.	2:56
2.	"Illella" (일낼라)	Kim D.; Kang Ji-won; Cosmic Girl (RBW); Moonbyul; Inner Child	Kim D.; Kang; Moonbyul; Inner Child	Kang	2:46
3.	"L.I.E.C"	Kim D.; Kang; Seo Yong-bae (RBW)	Kim D.; Kang; Seo	Kang; Seo	2:58
Total length:					8:40

== Charts ==
=== Weekly charts ===
Weekly chart performance for Mic On
Chart (2022)	Peak position
South Korean Albums (Circle)	7

=== Monthly charts ===
Monthly chart performance for Mic On
Chart (2022)	Peak position
South Korean Albums (Circle)	18
