= Yellow Flower =

EP by Mamamoo
- Released: March 7, 2018
- Studio: RBW Studio
- Genres: K-pop; R&B
- Length: 21:43
- Language: Korean
- Label: RBW

Mamamoo chronology
Purple (2017)	Yellow Flower (2018)	Red Moon (2018)

Singles from Yellow Flower
- 1. "Paint Me" Released: January 4, 2018; 2. "Starry Night" Released: March 7, 2018

Yellow Flower is the sixth extended play (EP) by South Korean girl group Mamamoo. It was released by RBW on March 7, 2018 and distributed by LOEN Entertainment. The EP contains seven total songs, including the singles "Paint Me" and "Starry Night". The EP is the first album under the Four Seasons, Four Colors project.

== Background and release ==
Following the release of "Paint Me" as a digital single in January 2018, Mamamoo announced their sixth mini-album Yellow Flower on February 20, with the release of the first teaser image. The group posted more teaser photos on February 26, the official track listing on February 27, daily teaser trailers featuring each member from February 28 to March 3, a group teaser trailer on March 4, and a "highlight medley" of the EP's seven tracks on March 5. The first album in a series of albums titled Four Seasons, Four Colors, Yellow Flower focuses on member Hwasa, represented by the color yellow and spring season, and features her new solo track "Be Calm." The album symbolizes the beginning of a relationship, like how spring starts the year and is associated with innocent love.

The cover art has flowers on it to reference Hwasa, since 화 (hwa) is the Hangul form of the Hanja 花 (eumhun 꽃 화; kkot hwa), which means "flower".

Yellow Flower was released to physical and digital retailers on March 7, 2018.

== Promotion ==
=== Singles ===
"Paint Me" (Korean: 칠해줘; RR: Chilhaejwo) was released as a digital single on January 4, 2018. The tentative and minimalist power ballad peaked at number 36 on the Gaon Digital Chart and 43 on the Billboard Korea K-Pop Hot 100. It also entered the charts in the United States, peaking at number 23 on the Billboard World Digital Songs Sales chart. The music video for the single, released in conjunction with the single itself, was posted to both Mamamoo's official and the 1theK distribution YouTube channels. As of December 2022, the music video has 10.7 million views when the totals from both channels are combined.

"Starry Night" (별이 빛나는 밤; Byeori binnaneun bam) was released as the main single (second overall) from the EP on March 7, 2018, in conjunction with the release of the EP itself. A dance track featuring "latin-inspired strings," "Starry Night" peaked at number two on the Gaon Digital Chart, one on the Billboard Korea K-Pop Hot 100, and eight on the Billboard World Digital Songs Sales chart. The song landed at number 13 on the year-end edition of the Gaon Digital Chart for 2018 and earned the group their first Platinum certification from the Korea Content & Music Association (KMCA); it surpassed 100 million streams in November 2018 and 2.5 million paid digital downloads in July 2019. Like with "Paint Me," the music video for "Starry Night" was posted to both Mamamoo's official YouTube channel and the 1theK channel. Directed by Won Ki Hong, the video was shot entirely in New Zealand and has 214 million combined views as of December 2022.

=== Other songs ===
A music video for "Star Wind Flower Sun" was released on March 6, 2018, preceding Yellow Flower's release, to Mamamoo's YouTube channel and the 1theK channel. The music video has 6.3 million views combined as of December 2022 and features the EP's introductory track, "From Winter to Spring."

A music video for Hwasa's solo track, "Be Calm" (Korean: 덤덤해지네), was posted on March 25, 2018. Posted solely to the group's YouTube channel, the video has 8.1 million views as of December 2022.

== Commercial performance ==
Yellow Flower debuted and peaked at number one on South Korea's Gaon Album Chart for the 10th issued week of 2018, becoming the group's first number-one album. The EP sold 42,280 copies in March 2018, placing at number eight on the monthly chart. It also entered at number 87 on the Gaon Album Chart's yearly edition for 2018. As of 2020, Yellow Flower has sold 60,114 copies in South Korea. In the United States, the album peaked at number seven on the Billboard World Albums chart.

== Track listing ==
No.	Title	Lyrics	Music	Arrangement	Length
1.	"From Winter to Spring" (겨울에서 봄으로) (intro)	Solar	Solar	Solar	0:24
2.	"Star Wind Flower Sun" (별 바람 꽃 태양)	Solar; Moonbyul	Solar	Lee Hyun-seung; TM	3:43
3.	"Starry Night" (별이 빛나는 밤)	Kim Do-hoon; Park Woo-sang; Moonbyul	Kim Do-hoon; Park Woo-sang	Kim Do-hoon; Park Woo-sang	3:31
4.	"Be Calm" (덤덤해지네) (Hwasa solo)	Hwasa	Park Woo-sang; Hwasa	Park Woo-sang	3:28
5.	"Rude Boy"	Cosmic Sound; Cosmic Girl; Moonbyul	Cosmic Sound; Cosmic Girl	Cosmic Sound; Cosmic Girl	3:10
6.	"Spring Fever" (봄타)	Jowul; Moonbyul	Command Freaks; Mayu	Command Freaks	3:48
7.	"Paint Me" (칠해줘)	Jowul	Mich Hansen; Peter Wallevik; Daniel Davidsen; Chelcee Grimes; Kara DioGuardi	Mich Hansen; Peter Wallevik; Daniel Davidsen; Chelcee Grimes; Kara DioGuardi	3:39
Total length:					21:43

== Charts ==
=== Weekly charts ===
Chart (2018)	Peak position
South Korean Albums (Gaon)	1
US World Albums (Billboard)	7

=== Monthly charts ===
Chart (2018)	Peak position
South Korean Albums (Gaon)	8

=== Year-end charts ===
Chart (2018)	Position
South Korean Albums (Gaon)	87
