= Starry Night (Mamamoo song) =

Single by Mamamoo

from the EP Yellow Flower
- Language: Korean
- Released: March 7, 2018
- Studio: RBW Studio
- Genre: K-pop
- Length: 3:32
- Label: RBW
- Songwriters: Moonbyul; Park Woo-sang; Kim Do-hoon
- Producers: Park Woo-sang; Kim Do-hoon

Mamamoo singles chronology
"Paint Me" (2018)	"Starry Night" (2018)	"Rainy Season" (2018)

Music video
- "Starry Night" on YouTube

"Starry Night" (Korean: 별이 빛나는 밤; RR: Byeori binnaneun bam) is a song by South Korean girl group Mamamoo. It was released on March 7, 2018, as the second single from the group's seventh EP Yellow Flower, the first EP in a series of releases focusing on each member. A dance-pop and Latin-inspired track, "Starry Night" was written by Moonbyul, Park Woo-sang, and Kim Do-hoon, with music and arrangement performed by the latter two. The song peaked at number two on the Gaon Digital Chart and earned the group their first-ever music recording certification, after surpassing 100 million streams according to the Gaon Music Chart.

== Background and release ==
In January 2018, Mamamoo released the digital single "Paint Me", a precursor to their upcoming album project titled 'Four Seasons, Four Colors', in which the group would release four EPs, each focusing on one member and a corresponding season. The next month, the group released the first teasers for the first EP in the series, Yellow Flower. "Starry Night" was released as the second single from Yellow Flower on March 7, 2018, alongside the release of the EP itself.

On August 7, 2019, the re-recorded Japanese-language version of the song was released as part of the group's debut Japanese album, 4colors, by JVCKenwood Victor Entertainment. On September 15, 2021, an orchestral remix of the song was released as part of their debut compilation album I Say Mamamoo: The Best.

== Composition ==
Sonically a dance-pop and K-pop track, "Starry Night" is a dance track featuring "Latin-inspired strings." The song is composed in the key of A minor and at a tempo of 124 BPM, running for three minutes and 31 seconds.

== Critical reception ==
"Starry Night" was met with positive critical reception upon release, with Hong Dam-young of The Korea Herald calling it "dramatic" and "dynamic." CelebMix stated that it "confirmed and lived up to the expectations of the fans and the critics" in a year when many K-pop acts were experimenting with Latin music."

== Commercial performance ==
A commercial success, "Starry Night" debuted at number two on the Gaon Digital Chart, earning 44.7 million index points in its first week. It remained at that position for four consecutive weeks, before dropping to number four for the issue dated April 7, 2018. The song was the highest-performing song of March 2018, earning 219 million index points in that time frame. It was the 13th highest-performing song of 2018 on the chart and was the fourth highest-performing song by a girl group, with over 818 million index points earned in 2018. The song earned a further 77 million points in 2019. "Starry Night" also peaked at number one on the Billboard Korea K-pop Hot 100 and number eight on Billboard World Digital Songs Sales.

In November 2018, "Starry Night" earned the group their first platinum certification from the Gaon Music Chart and Korean Music & Content Association for surpassing 100 million domestic streams. It was certified for 2.5 million digital downloads in July 2019.

== Music video ==
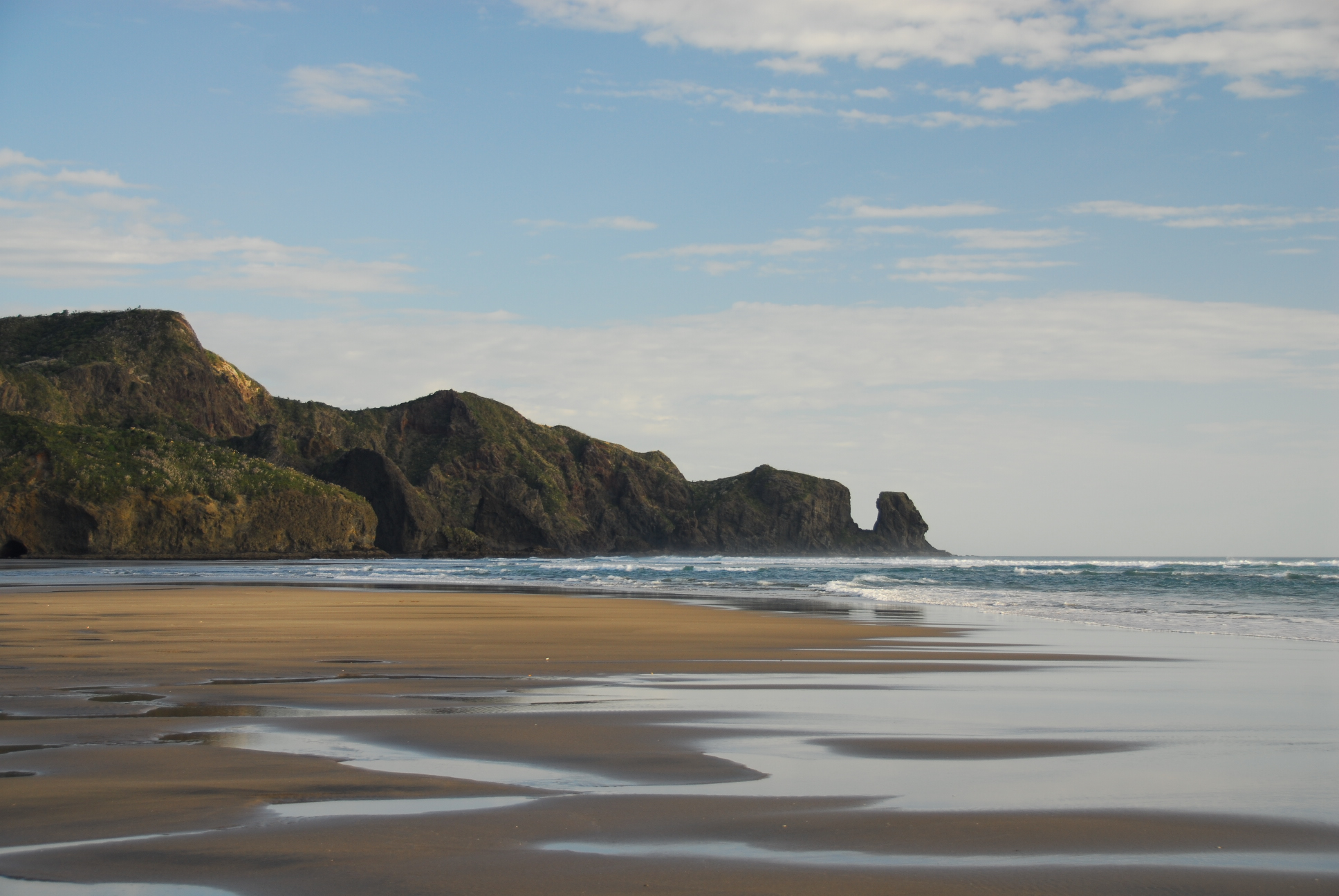
The music video was filmed in New Zealand, including at Bethels Beach in West Auckland (pictured).

The music video for "Starry Night" was directed by Won Ki-hong. It was shot entirely in New Zealand. Like with their music video for previous single "Paint Me", the music video was posted to both the group's official channel and the 1theK distributor channel. As of January 2025, the music video has a combined total of 237 million views across both channels.

== Accolades ==
Awards and nominations for "Starry Night"
Year	Awards	Category	Result
2018	Gaon Chart Music Awards	Song of the Year – March	Nominated
2018	Golden Disc Awards	Digital Song Bonsang	Won
2018	Melon Music Awards	Song of the Year	Nominated
2018	Melon Music Awards	Best Female Dance	Nominated
2018	Mnet Asian Music Awards	Song of the Year	Nominated
2018	Mnet Asian Music Awards	Best Vocal Performance – Group	Nominated
2018	Seoul Music Awards	Digital Song Bonsang	Won

Music program awards
Program	Date
The Show	March 13, 2018
The Show	March 20, 2018
Show Champion	March 14, 2018
M Countdown	March 15, 2018
M Countdown	March 22, 2018
Music Bank	March 16, 2018
Inkigayo	March 18, 2018
Inkigayo	March 25, 2018
Inkigayo	April 1, 2018

== Track listings ==
Digital download

1. "Starry Night" – 3:31

Digital download – Japanese version

1. "Starry Night" (Japanese version) – 3:31

Digital download – remix

1. "Starry Night" (orchestra version) – 3:34

== Charts ==
=== Weekly charts ===
Weekly chart performance for "Starry Night"
Chart (2018)	Peak position
South Korea (Gaon)	2
South Korea (K-pop Hot 100)	1
US World Digital Songs (Billboard)	8

=== Monthly charts ===
Monthly chart performance for "Starry Night"
Chart (2018)	Peak position
South Korea (Gaon)	1

=== Year-end charts ===
2018 year-end chart performance for "Starry Night"
Chart (2018)	Position
South Korea (Gaon)	13

2019 year-end chart performance for "Starry Night"
Chart (2019)	Position
South Korea Download (Gaon)	149

== Release history ==
Release history and formats for "Starry Night"
Region	Date	Format	Version	Label	Ref.
Various	March 7, 2018	Digital download; streaming	Korean	RBW; Kakao M	
Japan	August 7, 2019	Digital download; streaming	Japanese	Victor Entertainment	
Various	September 15, 2021	Digital download; streaming	Remix	RBW; Kakao Entertainment	
