= List of songs written by Kim Hee-chul =

Kim Hee-chul (born July 10, 1983), better known by the mononym Heechul, is a South Korean singer, songwriter, presenter, and actor. He is a member of the South Korean boy band Super Junior and has further participated in its subgroup, Super Junior-T, as well as the project group Universe Cowards with Min Kyung-hoon. He is also a former member of Kim Heechul & Kim Jungmo.

== Songwriting credits ==
Year	Song	Artist(s)	Album	Lyrics
2005	"Believe"	Super Junior	Twins	✓
2005	"Over"	Super Junior	Twins	✓ (with Eunhyuk)
2005	"Show Me Your Love"	Super Junior, TVXQ	Show Me Your Love	✓ (with Shindong, Eunhyuk)
2009	"Soul"	M&D	Super Show 2 Cottage Industry	✓
2010	"King Wang Zzang"	Defconn, Kim Hee-chul	Non-album single	✓
2011	"Close Ur Mouth"	M&D	Cottage Industry	✓
2011	"The Way An Idol Breaks Up"	Kim Hee-chul, Krystal Jung (f(x))	Super Show 3	✓
2011	"Oops"	Super Junior, f(x)	A-Cha	✓ (with Leeteuk, Shindong, Eunhyuk, Donghae and Misfit)
2011	"Shanghai Romance"	Orange Caramel	Orange Caramel	✓
2015	"I Wish"	M&D	Cottage Industry	✓
2015	"Midnight & Dawn"	M&D	Cottage Industry	✓
2015	"Moon Crystal"	M&D	Cottage Industry	✓
2015	"Silhouette"	M&D	Cottage Industry	✓
2015	"You Got It"	Kim Hee-chul, Leeteuk, Yesung, Eunhyuk, Donghae	Magic	✓ (with Leeteuk, Eunhyuk, Team One Sound)
2015	"Sarang♥"	Kim Hee-chul, Leeteuk	Magic	✓ (with Team One Sound)
2016	"Narcissus"	Kim Heechil & Kim Jungmo, Wheein (Mamamoo)	Goody Bag	✓
2016	"Ulsanbawi"	Kim Heechul & Kim Jungmo	Goody Bag	✓
2016	"Banana Shake"	Kim Heechul & Kim Jungmo	Goody Bag	✓
2016	"Essay"	Kim Heechul & Kim Jungmo	Goody Bag	✓
2016	"No Dap"	Kim Heechul & Kim Jungmo, No Dae-geon (Bursters)	Goody Bag	✓
2016	"Sweet Dream"	Kim Hee-chul, Min Kyung-hoon	SM Station: Season 1	✓
2017	"Spin Up!"	Super Junior	Play	✓ (with Eunhyuk, Jo Yoon-kyung)
2017	"I Do"	Super Junior]	Play	✓ (with Yoda, Min Yeon-jae, 1wol 8il)
2017	"Charm of Life"	Kim Hee-chul, Shindong, Eunhyuk, Solar (Mamamoo)	SM Station: Season 2	✓ (with Shindong, Eunhyuk)
2018	"Lo Siento"	Super Junior, Leslie Grace, Play-N-Skillz	Replay	✓ (with Kenzie, Eunhyuk, Mario Caceres, Yasmil Marrufo, Leslie Grace)
2018	"Lo Siento"	Super Junior, Kard (Jeon Somin, Jeon Jiwoo)	Replay	✓ (with Kenzie, Eunhyuk, Mario Caceres, Yasmil Marrufo, Leslie Grace)
2019	"Old Movie"	Kim Hee-chul	Non-album single	✓
2019	"Game"	Super Junior	Time Slip	✓ (with ZNEE, Jung Ku-ru & Kim Ji-soo, Eunhyuk)
2020	"Hanryang"	Kim Hee-chul, Min Kyung-hoon, Bibi	Non-album single	✓ (with DinDin, Min Kyung-hoon, Bibi)

== See also ==
- Super Junior discography
- Super Junior-T#Discography
- Kim Heechul & Kim Jungmo#Discography
