= No Thanks =

No Thanks may refer to:

- No Thanks (poetry collection), a 1935 volume of poetry by E. E. Cummings
- No Thanks! (game), a card game
- No Thanks (app), a Palestinian boycott-awareness app
- No Thanks! The '70s Punk Rebellion, a compilation album
- A slogan adopted by Better Together (campaign) in the 2014 Scottish independence referendum
- Song by Wheein, from her EP, Redd

== See also ==
- No Thank You (disambiguation)
