= Kim Jung-mo =

South Korean musician

Jungmo
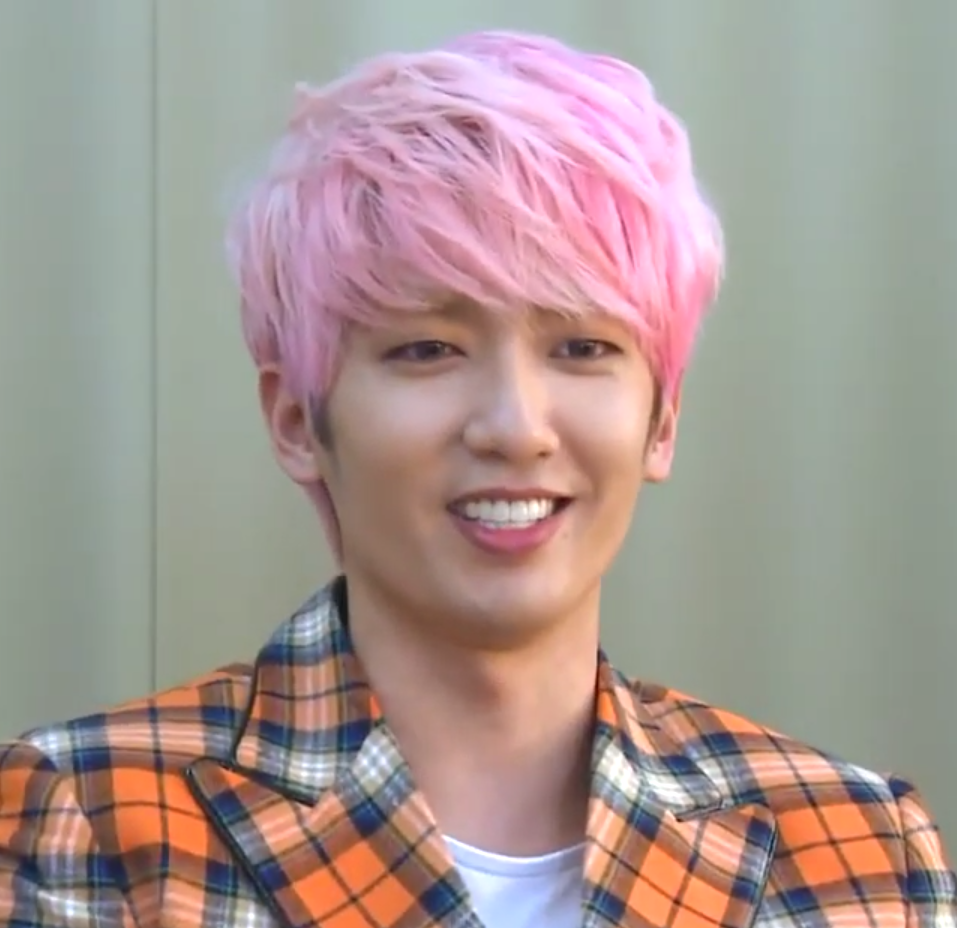
- Jungmo in 2015

Background information
- Born: Kim Jung-mo; March 26, 1985 (age 41); Seoul, South Korea
- Genres: Pop rock; alternative rock
- Occupation: Musician
- Instruments: Guitar; bass; vocals
- Years active: 2004–present
- Labels: SM; PA
- Member of: TRAX
- Formerly of: M&D; SM Town

Korean name
- Hangul: 김정모
- RR: Gim Jeongmo
- MR: Kim Chŏngmo

Kim Jung-mo (Korean: 김정모; born March 26, 1985), professionally known as Jungmo, is a South Korean musician. He debuted in 2004 as a member of South Korean rock band TRAX under SM and has participated in project group with Super Junior's Heechul, Kim Heechul & Kim Jungmo. In early 2012, his band TRAX took a break following their member military service and returned in January 2018 as a band before re-formed into EDM group, TraxX in the same year. In April 2019, Jungmo ended his contract with SM after fifteen years. He signed with PA Entertainment in November.

== Career ==
Jungmo was debuted as a member of TRAX under stage name X-Mas on July 20, 2004, with releasing their debut single Paradox. TRAX released extended play titled Cold-Hearted Man on January 25, 2010. Jungmo with member Jay was contributed to written and composed all track from the albums.

In 2011 he formed a project group with label mate Heechul called M&D (meaning "Midnight and Dawn" or "Miari and Dangae-dong", after the members' hometowns). They released their debut single, "Close Ur Mouth". Heechul wrote the lyrics and directed the music video for the song, while Jungmo produced and performed the instrumental. Their first live performance was at Mnet’s summer awards ceremony 20's Choice on July 7.

He enlisted for two years of mandatory military service, on 25 October 2012. They were originally scheduled to enlist together, but Jung-mo's scoliosis condition and a fractured collarbone delayed his enlistment. He served non-active duty as a public service worker for 23 months after completing four weeks of basic training. Due to the bandmembers' enlistment in the military, TRAX went on an indefinite hiatus.

In April 2015, M&D released their first EP, Cottage Industry with the lead track "I Wish" digitally on April 16 and physically on April 20. The title track was also written and composed by the duo, and peaked at number two on the Gaon album Chart. In August 2015, Jungmo was cast in the musical Whale Whale, which was held from September 11 to November 15.

On April 15, 2016, Kim Heechul released a duet with Wheein for SM Station. The single "Narcissus" was written by him and produced by Jungmo. In early July, M&D returned as Kim Heechul & Kim Jungmo, with a second EP, Goody Bag, and trot-rock lead track "Ulsanbawi" on July 12.

On April 30, 2019, Jungmo left SM Entertainment after his contract ended. On July 23, 2019, Jungmo released his first single "Peach (복숭아) (featuring Henry)" since departure from SM Entertainment. In November 2019, Jungmo signed with PA Entertainment. Later that month, Jungmo released his second single "If It Was Me". It is a medium-tempo retro synthpop genre song with lyrics that contain the heartbreaking feeling of a man who comforts and cheers with his heart hidden during counseling, saying that there are people whom his unrequited partner has in mind. The lyrics are based on his actual experience.

On June 14, 2021, Pink Fantasy released a teaser for their upcoming song "독(Poison)" featuring Jung Mo as the guitarist. The song was released 1 week later on June 21, 2021.

== Discography ==
=== Singles ===
Title	Year	Peak chart positions			Sales	Album
Title	Year	KOR		US World	Sales	Album
Title	Year	Gaon	Hot 100	US World	Sales	Album
"Peach" (복숭아) (featuring Henry)	2019	—	—	—	—	Non-album single
"If It Was Me" (그게 나였으면…)	2019	—	—	—	—	Non-album single
"Erase You" (널 지워야 한다)	2020	—	—	—	—	Non-album single
"Magic" (요술부렸나봐)	2020	—	—	—	—	Non-album single
"Happy Ending" (끝이 좋으면 다 좋아)	2021	—	—	—	—	Non-album single
"Make it Right" (네가 아니면 안돼)	2022	—	—	—	—	Non-album single
"Marionette" (마리오네트)	2023	—	—	—	—	Non-album single
"—" denotes releases that did not chart or were not released in that region.

== Filmography ==
=== TV shows ===
Year	Title	Role
2009	Band of Brothers	Cast
2009–2010	Oppa Band	Cast
2020	King of Mask Singer	Contestant as "Windmill" (episode 243)

=== Radio ===
Year	Title	Role
2010	Kiss the Radio	DJ – Corner Papa Band

== Theater ==
Year	English title	Korean title	Role	Ref.
2022–2023	Volume Up 2	볼륨업 2	Tommy Kim	
2023–2024	Volume Up 3	볼륨업 3	Tommy Kim	
