= Spit It Out =

Spit It Out may refer to:

- Spit It Out (TV series), a 2010 Australian children's game show
- "Spit It Out" (Slipknot song), 1999
- "Spit It Out" (IAMX song), 2006
- "Spit It Out" (Solar song), 2020
- "Spit It Out", a song by Ted Nugent from Scream Dream
