= No Thank You =

No Thank You may refer to:

== Music ==
- No Thank You (album), a 2022 album by British rapper Little Simz
- No Thank You, a 2001 album by Japanese rock band Coaltar of the Deepers
- No Thank You, a 2018 album by Kyle Falconer
- "No Thank You", a song by Bryson Tiller from his album Bryson Tiller

== Other uses ==
- No, Thank You!!!, a 2013 BL visual novel
- No, Thank You, a South Korean series released through KakaoTV

== See also ==
- No Thank You, Evil!, a tabletop game
- No Thanks (disambiguation)
