= Redd (EP) =

EP by Wheein
- Released: April 13, 2021
- Recorded: 2020–2021
- Studio: RBW (Seoul)
- Genre: R&B; soul; dance
- Length: 19:49
- Language: Korean; English
- Label: RBW
- Producer: Park Woosang

Wheein chronology
Soar (2019)	Redd (2021)	Whee (2022)

Singles from Redd
- 1. "Water Color" Released: April 13, 2021

Redd is the debut extended play by South Korean singer and Mamamoo member Wheein. It was released on April 13, 2021, through RBW and consists of seven tracks, including the lead single "Water Color". Wheein stated that the meaning of the album is "'to tidy up' and 'to get rid of' meaning to get out of false tastes and paint...honest colors."

== Background and release ==
On March 26, 2021, RBW confirmed that Wheein would be making her solo comeback, marking over a year since her last solo promotions with Solar and the title song "Goodbye" in September 2019. On March 28, Wheein released a teaser video for her upcoming solo album with the caption ‘Coming Soon’. On April 2 at midnight KST, the first promotional concept photo was released with the name of the name of the album revealed as Redd and the official release date April 13. The same day, a teaser schedule was released. On April 6, Wheein released a second concept photo and concept film for Redd. On April 6, the track list was revealed to contain seven songs with “Water Color” serving as the title track. On April 7, a third concept photo was posted on the official Mamamoo SNS. On April 8, a teaser for the official music video was released on the official Mamamoo YouTube channel, along with sneak peeks of the other songs on the mini album. On April 9, a fourth concept photo was released. On April 10, a fifth concept photo was released. On April 12, a second music video teaser was released for “Water Color”.

== Track listing ==
Redd track listing
No.	Title	Lyrics	Music	Arrangement	Length
1.	"Water Color"	Park Woosang; JQ; Nam Hyeju	Park Woosang	Park Woosang	3:10
2.	"Trash" (featuring pH-1)	Park Woosang; pH-1	Park Woosang; Wheein; pH-1	Park Woosang	2:52
3.	"Ohoo"	Wheein	Ahn Shinae	Choi Yong Chan	3:16
4.	"Butterfly" (featuring G.Soul)	Park Woosang	Park Woosang	Park Woosang; Ming Khi	3:29
5.	"Springtime" (봄이 너에게; Bomi neoege; 'Spring to you')	Wheein; Park Woosang	Park Woosang; Wheein; Fisherman	Fisherman	2:41
6.	"No Thanks"	Park Woosang	Park Woosang	Park Woosang	3:52
7.	"Water Color" (English version)	Park Woosang; ReMi (Makeumine Works); JQ; Nam Hyeju	Park Woosang	Park Woosang	3:10
Total length:					19:49

== Charts ==
=== EP ===
Chart performance for Redd
Chart (2021)	Peak position
South Korean Albums (Gaon)	7

=== Other charted songs ===
Other charted songs from Redd
Title	Year	Peak chart positions
Title	Year	KOR Down.
"Trash" (featuring pH-1)	2021	47
"Ohoo" (오후)	2021	48
"Butterfly" (featuring G.Soul)	2021	49
"Springtime" (봄이 너에게)	2021	50
"No Thanks"	2021	51

== Release history ==
Release formats for Redd
Region	Date	Format	Label	Ref.
South Korea	April 13, 2021	CD, digital download, streaming	RBW	
Various	April 13, 2021	CD, digital download, streaming	RBW	
