= Jung Key =

South Korean singer and songwriter

Jung Key 정키
- Born: October 10, 1986 (age 39); Seoul, South Korea
- Genres: Ballad; R&B
- Occupation: Composer
- Years active: 2011–present
- Label: Those Records
- Website: those-records.com

Jung Key (Korean: 정키; born October 10, 1986), is a South Korean composer. He released his first album, Emotion, on May 29, 2014.

== Discography ==
=== Studio albums ===
Title	Album details	Peak chart positions	Sales
Title	Album details	KOR	Sales
Emotion	Released: May 29, 2014; Label: Jung Key, The Ambassador; Formats: CD, digital download	27	KOR: 741

=== Singles ===
Title	Year	Peak chart positions	Sales (DL)	Album
Title	Year	KOR	Sales (DL)	Album
As lead artist
"Be Forgotten" (잊혀지다) feat. Yang Da-il	2011	—	—N/a	Emotion
"Alone" (홀로) feat. Kim Na-young	2012	61	KOR: 553,762	Emotion
"Mama" feat. Gu Yoon-hoe, Han Ye-seul, Shin Jong-wook, Kim Na-young	2013	—	—N/a	Emotion
"Mirror" (거울) feat. Sunwoo Jung-a	2013	—	—N/a	Emotion
"Things I Can't Say" (내가 할 수 없는 말) feat. Navi	2014	13	KOR: 387,310	Emotion
"I Don't Want" (바라지 않아) feat. Sojung of Ladies' Code	2016	26	KOR: 150,625	Non-album singles
"Anymore" (부담이 돼) feat. Wheein of Mamamoo	2017	1	KOR: 1,073,117	Non-album singles
"First Love" (첫사랑) feat. Yuju of GFriend	2017	38	KOR: 70,931	Non-album singles
Collaborations
"We're Different" (우린 알아) with Yang Da-il	2015	44	KOR: 82,854	Non-album singles
"Without You" with Gummy, Sisqo	2015	85	KOR: 22,551	Non-album singles
"—" denotes releases that did not chart.

=== Other charted songs ===
Title	Year	Peak chart positions	Sales (DL)	Album
Title	Year	KOR	Sales (DL)	Album
"I'm Sorry" feat. Welldone Potato	2014	—	KOR: 19,521	Emotion
"After Meeting You" (너를 만나) feat. Baek Ji-woong	2014	—	KOR: 15,983	Emotion
"Being Left" (남겨진 건) feat. King Bak, Kim Min-jung	2014	—	KOR: 15,060	Emotion
"Graze" (스치는) feat. Baek Ji-woong	2016	—	KOR: 17,480	Non-album singles
"Today" (오늘도) feat. Doko	2017	—	KOR: 15,533	Non-album singles
"Only You" feat. U Sung-eun	2017	—	KOR: 19,110	Non-album singles
"—" denotes releases that did not chart.

== Filmography ==
=== Television shows ===
Year	Title	Role	Ref.
2022	Listen-Up	Regular Member	

== Awards and nominations ==
=== Gaon Chart Music Awards ===
Year	Category	Recipient	Result
2017	Song of the Year (March)	Anymore feat. Wheein (Mamamoo)	Nominated
