= Want (Solar song) =

2025 single by Solar

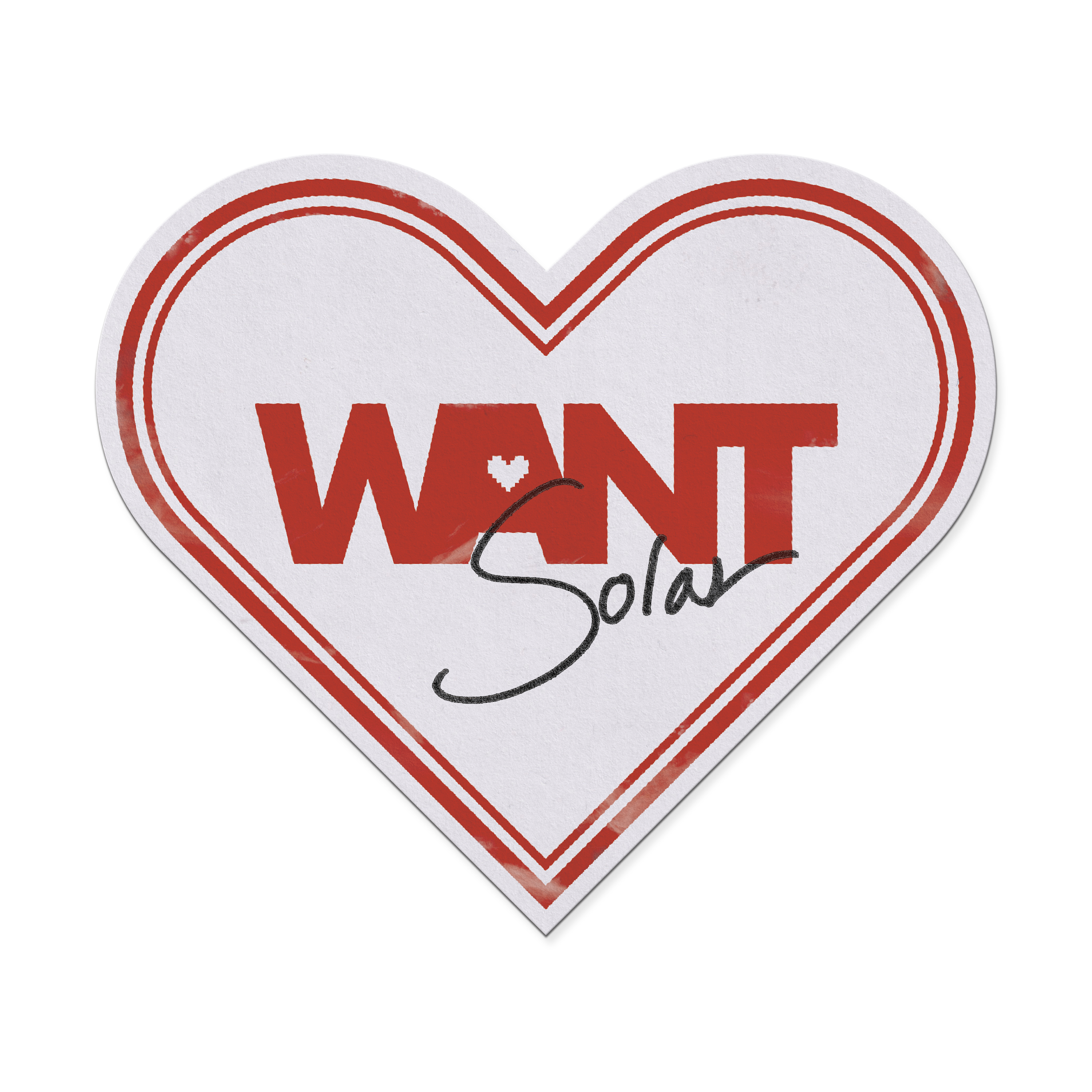

Song by Solar
- Language: Korean
- Released: April 2, 2025
- Genre: K-pop
- Length: 3:31
- Label: RBW

Solar singles chronology
"Colors" (2024)	"Want" (2025)	"To My 20s" (2026)

"Want" (stylized in all caps) is a song recorded by South Korean singer Solar. An upbeat, nu-disco and pop song, it was released on April 2, 2025, by RBW. The song was written by Jang Da-in and Dr. JO, with composition by Joacim Persson, Johan Alkenäs, Sqvare, and Avenue 52.

== Background and release ==
"WANT" is Solar’s second solo single, released a year after her second mini-album Colours in April of last year. 'WANT' is a pop song that harmoniously combines a lively brass sound and Solar's powerful vocals. It is a "spring song that shouts" that breaks everyone's expectations, and features Solar's free and confident charm.

In the music video released with the song, Solar plays both the roles of a 'Nerd' who wants to love and a 'Secret Partner' who helps the nerd's love. The 'Secret Partner' works to encourages those who hesitate in love to run to the person they like by breaking free from worries and fears with her unique confident attitude.

The song was described as presenting "a rich visual narrative" that sensually captures the changes in emotions, while dynamic production utilizing "kitschy performances and tricks" will provide a lot to see.

== Track listing ==
Want track listing
No.	Title	Lyrics	Music	Arrangement	Length
1.	"Want"	Jang Da-in; Dr. JO	Joacim Persson; Johan Alkenas; SQVARE; AVENUE 52	Joacim Persson; Johan Alkenas	3:31
2.	"Want (Inst.)"	-	Joacim Persson; Johan Alkenas; SQVARE; AVENUE 52	Joacim Persson; Johan Alkenas	3:31
Total length:					7:04

== Charts ==
Chart (2025)	Peak position
South Korea (Circle)	55
