= Colours (EP) =

- Digital cover

EP by Solar
- Released: April 30, 2024
- Genre: K-pop
- Length: 16:09
- Language: Korean
- Label: RBW

Solar chronology
Face (2022)	Colours (2024)	Want (Single) (2025)

Singles from Colours
- 1. "But I" Released: April 30, 2024; 2. "Colors" Released: May 6, 2024

Colours is the second extended play (EP) by South Korean singer-songwriter Solar, the leader of Mamamoo, released on April 30, 2024, by RBW. "But I" served as the EP's lead single, with "Colors" being released as a single a week later.

== Background and release ==
On April 8, 2024, the first teaser for Colours was released, two years and one month after the release of her first mini album Face. Colours was released on the April 30, 2024 at 6 pm through various music sites, CD and Nemoz version. The EP title features six main concepts or colors: Glam Silver, Reborn Beige, Bubblegum Pink, Ebony Black, Midnight Blue, and Tangerine Orange. Each color represents the six songs featured on the EP, all of which have different genres attached to them. Glam Silver represents "Colors", Reborn Beige represents "But I" (lead single), Midnight Blue represents "Empty", Bubblegum Pink represents "Honey Honey", Tangerine Orange represents "Easy Peasy", and Ebony Black represents "Blues".

Before the release of the EP, Solar held an exhibit titled "Colours: the Exhibit" that featured exclusive photographs from the album photoshoot and music video photoshoot. The exhibit was held from April 27 to May 7, 2024.

The lead single "But I" was written by Solar, Kim Do Hoon, and Lee Hoo Sang. "But I" is Solar's first attempt at rock music as a solo artist. "But I" is described as a rock and R&B song with a twist in the melody of its chorus. The song features Reborn Beige as its main concept, where Solar's old self has died and was reborn. She then takes revenge on those who have hurt her. The revenge can be a lover, or a friend, as Solar intended for it to be a feel-good song for every listener.

The first music video teaser for "But I" was released on April 24, 2024. It featured Solar riding a white horse in Mongolia, and playing a piano in the desert. The music video was released on April 30, 2024. A performance video was released for the song "Colors" on May 6, 2024, which featured Solar's first attempt at voguing dance. The choreography from ballroom house "House of Love". It is described as the first K-pop song to fully feature voguing from start to finish.

== Track listing ==
Colours track listing
No.	Title	Lyrics	Music	Arrangement	Length
1.	"Colors"	Solar	Solar	Kim Do Hoon (RBW); Seo Young Bae (RBW)	2:30
2.	"But I" (벗아이)	Solar; Kim; Lee Hoo Sang (RBW)	Kim; Lee; Jenabi	Kim; Lee	2:40
3.	"Empty" (텅)	Solar	Solar	Jang Minho (RBW)	2:24
4.	"Honey Honey"	Seonhui (153/Joombas); Na Jung-ah (153/Joombas)	David Randolph (Drando); Alina Smith; Annalise Morelli	Randolph; Lyre	3:07
5.	"Easy Peasy"	Solar	Solar	lunCHbox	2:35
6.	"Blues"	Kim; Solar	Kim; Solar	Kim	2:51
Total length:					16:09

== Critical reception and accolades ==
Colors was listed as the "Top 50 best K-pop tracks of 2024" by British magazine Dazed. Dazed highlighted Colors as a "queer anthem and self-affirmation marathon of a party". Daxed also highlights Colors as a rare example of diverse LGBTQ+ representation in K-pop, and praised the song for its joyous and defiant sound and tone with its lyrics “Look in the mirror… And say it, I'm sick, so bad, louder, louder, I'm sick, I'm hot, I'm gorgeous”

== Charts ==
Chart performance for Colours
Chart (2024)	Peak position
South Korean Albums (Circle)	14

== Awards ==
Awards for Colours
Date	Show	Song	Award
May 7, 2024	The Show	"But I"	1st place

== Release history ==
Release history for Colours
Region	Date	Format	Label
South Korea	April 30, 2024	CD; Nemoz	RBW
Various	April 30, 2024	digital download; streaming	RBW
