= The Cursed (2025 film) =

2025 film by Hong Won-ki

- Theatrical release poster
- Hangul: 귀시
- RR: Gwisi
- MR: Kwisi
- Directed by: Hong Won-ki
- Written by: Hong Won-ki
- Produced by: Jerry Good Company
- Starring: Yoo Jae-myung; Moon Chae-won; Seo Young-hee; Won Hyun-joon; Solar; Cha Sun-woo; Bae Su-min; Seo Ji-soo; Son Juyeon; Ngoc Xuan; Emma Le
- Production companies: BY4M Studio; Zanybros; Jerry Good Company
- Distributed by: BY4M Studio
- Release dates: September 7, 2025 (France); September 17, 2025 (South Korea)
- Running time: 96 minutes
- Country: South Korea
- Language: Korean
- Box office: US$482,422

The Cursed (Korean: 귀시) is a 2025 South Korean supernatural horror film produced by Jerry Good Company and distributed by BY4M Studio. Directed by Hong Won-ki, it tells the chilling story of those seeking to acquire what they don't have through buying from gwisi, a ghost market that unfolds when a fox window opens.

The film stars Yoo Jae-myung, Moon Chae-won, Seo Young-hee, Won Hyun-joon, Solar, Cha Sun-woo, Bae Su-min, Seo Ji-soo, Son Juyeon, Ngoc Xuan and Emma Le.

== Premise ==
The protagonists face an unbearable price as a fox window opens, revealing the bizarre world of gwisi. The characters face bizarre transformations after trading with ghosts for money, looks, grades, and popularity.

== Cast ==
- Yoo Jae-myung as Dong-sik, a detective who pursues a mysterious kidnapper with a dogmatic resolve to redeem himself
- Moon Chae-won as Chae-won, a woman obsessed with her looks
- Seo Young-hee as Hee-jin, who risks everything to enter the forbidden market gwisi to secure her daughter's place at a prestigious university
- Won Hyun-joon as Park Soo-moo, a shaman who penetrates the world of gwisi
- Solar as Mi-yeon, a woman who comes to a rural village to pursue her dream of becoming a famous writer
- Cha Sun-woo as Yoon-gun, a rookie detective who joins Dong-sik's unconventional investigation to gain recognition for his skills
- Bae Su-min as Soo-yeon, Hee-jin's daughter, a student obsessed with grades and college entrance exams
- Seo Ji-soo as Eun-seo, a woman obsessed with her appearance who embarks on a dangerous deal
- Son Juyeon as Eun-jin, an international student obsessed with social media views to become an influencer

== Release and reception ==
=== Box office ===
The film was released on September 17, 2025, in South Korea. It was placed at 4th place at domestic box office on opening day.

=== Critical response ===
As of September 20, it has an 8.21/10 rating in Naver score, with many praising the actors' performances but critical of the story's development.
