= Face (EP) =

EP by Solar
- Released: March 16, 2022
- Genre: K-pop
- Length: 13:35
- Language: Korean
- Label: RBW

Solar chronology
Spit It Out (2020)	Face (2022)	Colours (2024)

Singles from Face
- 1. "Honey" Released: March 16, 2022

Face (stylized as 容 : FACE) is the debut extended play (EP) by South Korean singer-songwriter Solar, the leader of Mamamoo, released on March 16, 2022, by RBW.

== Background and release ==
On February 22, 2022, the first teaser for Face was released. It shows a face motion logo of Solar's new EP Face. The EP title was inspired by the hanja 容, pronouncing yong, from the singer's real name Kim Yong-sun. She described the concept of Face as her true and sincere self, as well as an appreciation towards self-love, uniqueness, and beauty, "just as the faces of people living in the world are all different, each and every one of them is precious." In particular, as her face reflects emotions and the path that person has walked, Solar plans to show various colors of music by comparing her sincere thoughts, feelings, and values.

The lead single "Honey" was written and composed by Solar, Kim Do-hoon, and Seo Young-bae. An accompanying music video for "Honey" was released simultaneously with the single. "Honey" is a witty and kitsch song about how people tempt her sweetly, just like bees bring honey to the queen bee.

== Track listing ==
Face track listing
No.	Title	Lyrics	Music	Arrangement	Length
1.	"RAW"	Kim Do-hoon (RBW); Minky (RBW); Solar	Kim; Minky	Lee Hoo-sang (RBW); Minky	1:11
2.	"Honey" (꿀)	Kim; Seo Young-bae (RBW); Solar	Kim; Seo; Solar; Minky	Minky	2:47
3.	"Chap Chap" (찹찹)	Solar; Cosmic Girl; Cosmic Sound (RBW)	Solar; Cosmic Girl; Cosmic Sound	Cosmic Girl; Cosmic Sound	2:59
4.	"Big Booty"	Solar	Solar	Ha Hyung-joo; Dunk	3:52
5.	"Zinggle Zinggle" (징글징글)	Cosmic Girl; Cosmic Sound	Cosmic Girl; Cosmic Sound	Cosmic Girl; Cosmic Sound	2:46
Total length:					13:35

== Critical reception ==
Professional ratings
Review scores
Source	Rating
NME	4/5 stars

容 : Face has been met with positive critical acclaim from reviews. NME critic Rhian Daly gave the album a 4 out of 5 score, and stated "‘容 : FACE’ captures Solar's energetic, bright and breezy personality well. The rap verse on ‘Honey’ is a particular highlight that showcases her dynamism, while the mini-album as a whole pops with little vocal details that subtly elevate the songs." In addition, Honey has been listed as one of the 'Best K-pop Track of 2022' by British magazine Dazed. Dazed stated "Solar often changes the sense of speed and atmosphere in the song, which further emphasizes the meaning of the lyrics written by Solar herself, doubling the feeling of challenge. It is a sweet yet bright and bold song."

=== Year-end lists ===
Critic/publication	List	Track	Rank	Ref.
Dazed	The best K-pop tracks of 2022	"Honey"	38	

== Charts ==
=== Weekly charts ===
Weekly chart performance for Face
Chart (2022)	Peak position
South Korean Albums (Gaon)	7

=== Monthly charts ===
Monthly chart performance for Face
Chart (2022)	Peak position
South Korean Albums (Gaon)	20

== Release history ==
Release history for Face
Region	Date	Format	Label
Various	March 16, 2022	CD; digital download; streaming	RBW
