= Spit It Out (Solar song) =

2020 single by Solar

Single by Solar
- Language: Korean; English; Spanish
- Released: April 23, 2020
- Recorded: 2019–2020
- Genre: K-pop; dark pop; Latin pop
- Length: 3:14
- Label: RBW
- Songwriters: Solar; Kim Do-hoon
- Producers: Kim Do-hoon; Kim Sung-won

Solar singles chronology
"Spit It Out" (2020)	"Honey" (2022)

Music videos
- "Spit it Out (Mamamoo)" on YouTube

"Spit It Out" (Korean: 뱉어; RR: Baeteo) is the debut single by South Korean singer Solar of Mamamoo, released on April 23, 2020, by RBW. The song was written by Solar and Kim Do-hoon, who also produced the single alongside rapper Sleepy. An accompanying music video for the song, directed by Zanybros, was released simultaneously with the single. "Spit It Out" is a dark pop and Latin pop song that features Latin guitar riffs which blend with "unique synth sounds" and contains a catchy hook.

In South Korea, the song debuted at number 96, later peaking at number 71 on the Gaon Digital Chart. The physical version went on to debut at number two on the Gaon Album Chart. Moreover, the song attained international success, becoming her first top ten single on Billboard's World Digital Songs chart. The song gave Solar her first-ever solo music show win on SBS MTV's The Show on April 28, 2020.

== Background and release ==
On April 10, 2020, RBW announced that Mamamoo's Solar would be making her solo debut with the single "Spit It Out" on April 23. The first promotional teaser poster for the single was released on the same day. The official cover artwork was revealed on April 13. On April 14, the first teaser photo and a 24-second intro teaser video were released through Mamamoo's official SNS accounts. On April 15, the second teaser photo was revealed. On April 16, the third teaser photo along with a performance version of concept teaser were released. On April 17, the fourth teaser photo and a special version concept teaser video were released. On April 20, the fifth teaser photo and a teaser for the music video of the single were released. Ahead of the single album release, Solar revealed an interview preview video recorded in the corner of the practice room during the choreography practice, through her official SNS channel. On April 22, the sixth teaser photo and another teaser for the music video were released.

The single was released on April 23 with an accompanying music video. Solar participated in writing and conceptualizing the entire single album.

== Composition ==
"The title song is 'Spit It Out,' which means that I always like to challenge new things and spit out all my passion."

— Solar talking about the single

The song was written by Solar and Kim Do-hoon. Produced by Kim Do-hoon and rapper Sleepy, the song is composed in the key of E minor with a tempo of 128 beats per minute. It runs for three minutes and fourteen seconds. Musically, "Spit It Out" combines dark pop and Latin pop genres. It has been described as an empowering song built on "trance sound on top of an energetic beat." It features Latin guitar riffs which blend with "unique synth sounds" and contains a catchy hook. The song uses minimalist instrumentation from bass and percussion to highlight the singer's vocals. The lyrics revolve around themes of self-confidence and success. According to a press release, the song lyrically "unleashes the words and actions that Solar wants to say, and expresses the confidence and confident figure that is not bound by other people's standards."

== Promotion ==
Solar had her debut stage on the music program M Countdown! on April 23, 2020, where she performed the song. She also performed the song on KBS's Music Bank, MBC's Show! Music Core, SBS's Inkigayo, SBS MTV's The Show, and MBC Music's Show Champion. The song won first place on SBS MTV's The Show giving Solar her first music show win. A performance video, directed by Kim Jihoon, was released on April 28 which shows Solar and a group of dancers performing choreography to the song.

== Commercial performance ==
According to Hanteo Chart data, the physical version of the single sold 62,000 copies on the first day of its release. The physical edition went on to debut at number two on the Gaon Album Chart. The song debuted at number 12 on the Billboard World Digital Song Sales chart, later peaking at number 6. With two days of tracking, it debuted at number 96 on the Gaon Digital Chart. On the week of May 7, 2020, the song peaked at number 71.

== Track listing ==
Download, CD and streaming

- 1. "Spit it Out" – 3:14
- 2. "Spit it Out" (Instrumental) – 3:14

== Charts ==
=== Weekly charts ===
Chart (2020)	Peak position
South Korea (Gaon)	71
South Korean Albums (Gaon)	2
South Korea (Kpop Hot 100)	37
US World Digital Songs (Billboard)	6

== Music program awards ==
Program	Network	Date	Ref.
The Show	SBS MTV	April 28, 2020	

== Release history ==
Region	Date	Format	Label
Various	April 23, 2020	Download; streaming; CD	RBW
