= Cottage Industry (EP) =

EP by M&D
- Released: April 20, 2015
- Recorded: 2009–2015
- Genres: Dance; ballad
- Length: 20:00
- Language: Korean
- Labels: S.M. Entertainment; KT Music
- Producers: Lee Soo-man; Kim Jung-mo

M&D chronology
Cottage Industry (2015)	Goody Bag (2016)

Singles from Cottage Industry
- 1. "Close Ur Mouth" Released: June 22, 2011; 2. "I Wish" Released: April 16, 2015

Music videos
- "Close Ur Mouth" on YouTube
- "I Wish" on YouTube

Cottage Industry (Korean: 가내 수공업; Hanja: 家內手工業) is the first EP album by South Korean duo M&D, released by SM Entertainment and distributed KT Music on April 20, 2015.

It is their only release as M&D before changing their name.

== Background and release ==
On March 17 a few reports have come out to reveal that SM Entertainment mentioned that M&D's releasing their first EP album Cottage Industry on April 20 with "I Wish" as its lead track. Along with the already announced featuring of GFriend's Yerin, there were a number of other celebrities who made an appearances in it, such as Lee Jin Ho, Cho Jae Geol, Gun Hee, and Jang Dong-min. This is the project duo's comeback after a 3-year and 10-month hiatus following the release of the single "Close Ur Mouth". The release is an EP album with six tracks written by Heechul and composed by Jungmo.

== Promotion ==
Kim Heechul & Kim Jungmo began performing "I Wish" on South Korean music television programs (Music Bank) on April 17, 2015.

== Track listing ==
No.	Title	Lyrics	Music	Arrangement	Length
1.	"M&D" (Midnight&Dawn)	Kim Hee-chul	Kim Jung-mo	Kim Jung-mo	2:41
2.	"I Wish" (하고 싶어)	Kim Hee-chul	Kim Jung-mo	Kim Jung-mo	3:20
3.	"Moon Crystal" (달수정)	Kim Hee-chul	Kim Jung-mo	Kim Jung-mo	3:49
4.	"Silhouette" (실루엣)	Kim Hee-chul	Kim Jung-mo	Kim Jung-mo	3:53
5.	"Soul" (魂)	Kim Hee-chul	Kim Jung-mo	Kim Jung-mo	3:08
6.	"Close Ur Mouth" (뭘봐)	Kim Hee-chul	Kim Jung-mo	Kim Jung-mo	3:09
Total length:					20:00

== Charts ==
=== Album charts and sales ===
Chart	Peak position	Sales
Gaon Album Chart	2	26,168+

=== Single ===
Chart	Song	Peak position	Download Count
South Korean Charts (Gaon)	"Close Ur Mouth"	-	55,603+
South Korean Charts (Gaon)	"I Wish"	100	—N/a
