= Goody Bag (Kim Heechul & Kim Jungmo EP) =

EP by Kim Heechul & Kim Jungmo
- Released: July 12, 2016
- Recorded: 2016
- Studios: Doobdoob (Seoul); Evermore (Seoul); InGrid (Seoul); Seoul
- Genres: Pop rock; Trot
- Length: 19:06
- Language: Korean
- Labels: Label SJ; SM; KT Music
- Producers: Lee Soo-man; Kim Jung-mo

Kim Heechul & Kim Jungmo chronology
Cottage Industry (2015)	Goody Bag (2016)

Singles from Goody Bag
- 1. "Narcissus" Released: April 15, 2016; 2. "Ulsanbawi" Released: July 12, 2016

Music videos
- "Narcissus" on YouTube
- "Ulsanbawi" on YouTube

Goody Bag (Korean: 종합선물세트) is the second and final EP album by the South Korean duo Kim Heechul & Kim Jungmo, released by Label SJ, SM Entertainment and distributed KT Music on July 12, 2016.

== Background and release ==
On July 6, 2016 Kim Heechul & Kim Jungmo announced to be releasing their second EP album titled Goody Bag on July 12. The lead track, "Ulsanbawi" is traditional trot genre. The album contains six tracks, all written by Heechul and composed by Jungmo. This time, they also changed their group name to Kim Heechul & Kim Jungmo.

== Promotion ==
Kim Heechul & Kim Jungmo began performing "Ulsanbawi" on South Korean music television programs (The Show) on July 19, 2016.

== Track listing ==
All lyrics are written by Kim Hee-chul; all music is composed by Kim Jung-mo.

No.	Title	Arrangement	Length
1.	"Ulsanbawi" (울산바위; ulsanbawi; lit. 'Ulsanbawi rock')	Kim Jung-mo	3:12
2.	"Banana Shake" (바나나쉐이크; bananasweikeu; lit. 'Banana shake')	Kim Jung-mo	3:21
3.	"Essay" (수필; supil; lit. 'Essay')	Kim Jung-mo	3:55
4.	"No DAP" (Feat. Noh Dae-geon (from Bursters))	Kim Jung-mo	2:44
5.	"Narcissus" (With. Wheein (from Mamamoo))	Kim Jung-mo]	3:42
6.	"Ulsanbawi" (Highway Remix Ver.)	Kim Jung-mo	3:32
Total length:			19:06

== Charts ==
=== Album charts and sales ===
Chart	Peak position	Sales
Gaon Album Chart	5	10,348+

=== Single ===
Chart	Song	Peak position
South Korean Charts (Gaon)	"Narcissus"	140

== Release history ==
Region	Date	Format	Label	Ref.
South Korea	July 12, 2016	CD	SM; Label SJ; KT Music	
Various	July 12, 2016	Digital download; streaming	SM; Label SJ	
