= No Thanks (app) =

Palestinian boycott-awareness application

- Developer: Ahmed Bashbash
- Release: 13 November 2023
- Operating system: iOS, Android
- Website: bashsquare.com/projects/no-thanks

No Thanks is a Palestinian boycott-awareness mobile application developed by Palestinian software engineer Ahmed Bashbash, created to assist consumers in identifying and boycotting products associated with companies linked to Israel. Launched in 13 November 2023, the app gained significant attention amid the Gaza–Israel conflict.

== History ==
No Thanks is a mobile application developed by Ahmed Bashbash, a Palestinian software engineer from Gaza residing in Hungary. The app was conceived in October 2023 following the death of Bashbash's brother in an Israeli airstrike on October 31, 2023. His sister had previously died in 2020 due to delayed medical treatment.

The app was officially launched on November 13, 2023, and quickly gained traction, got over 100,000 downloads within its first month of release.

On November 30, 2023, Google removed the app from its Play Store due to a violation of its content policies. The app's home page included a description: "Welcome to No Thanks, here you can see if the product in your hand supports killing children in Palestine or not," which was deemed to contravene Google's guidelines on hate speech and sensitive content. On December 3, 2023, following changes to the app's description, Google reinstated the app.

== See also ==
- Boycott, Divestment and Sanctions
- Ethical consumerism
- Digital activism
