= No Thanks! (game) =

2004 card game

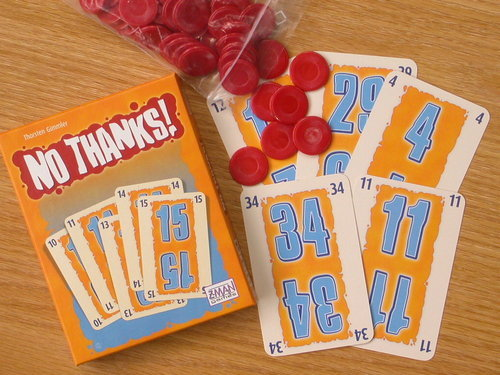
- Designers: Thorsten Gimmler
- Illustrators: Oliver Freudenreich; Atelier Löwentor
- Publishers: Amigo Spiele
- Genres: Card game
- Players: 3 to 7
- Setup time: 1 minute
- Playing time: 20 minutes
- Age range: 8 years and up

No Thanks! is a card game for three to seven players designed by Thorsten Gimmler. Originally called Geschenkt! (presented (as a gift) in German) and published by Amigo Spiele in 2004, it was translated into English by Z-Man Games.

== Gameplay ==
There are playing cards numbered 3 to 35 in the game, and nine cards are chosen at random and removed from the deck, which is then shuffled. If there are 3 to 5 players, each player starts with 11 chips; if there are 6 players, each player starts with 9 chips; and if there are 7 players, each player starts with 7 chips. At any time, players may choose to hide their chips from other players if desired. The first player flips over the top card and either takes it (earning that player points according to the value) or passes on the card by paying a chip (placing it on the card) and saying, "No thanks!" Play then proceeds in a clockwise circle until someone finally takes the card along with all of its accumulated chips, if any. That same player then flips over the next card, also deciding on whether to take the card or pass it, and so the game continues until all cards have been taken.

At the end of the game, players accrue points from cards according to their value, but cards in a row only count as a single card with the lowest value (e.g., a run with cards numbered 30, 29, 28, 27 is worth 27 points). Chips are worth one negative point each. The player(s) with the lowest number of points win(s) the game.

== Reception ==
No Thanks! was nominated in 2005 for the German Spiel des Jahres (Game of the Year) award.

== Reviews ==
- Pyramid
