= Kim Heechul & Kim Jungmo =

South Korean pop rock duo

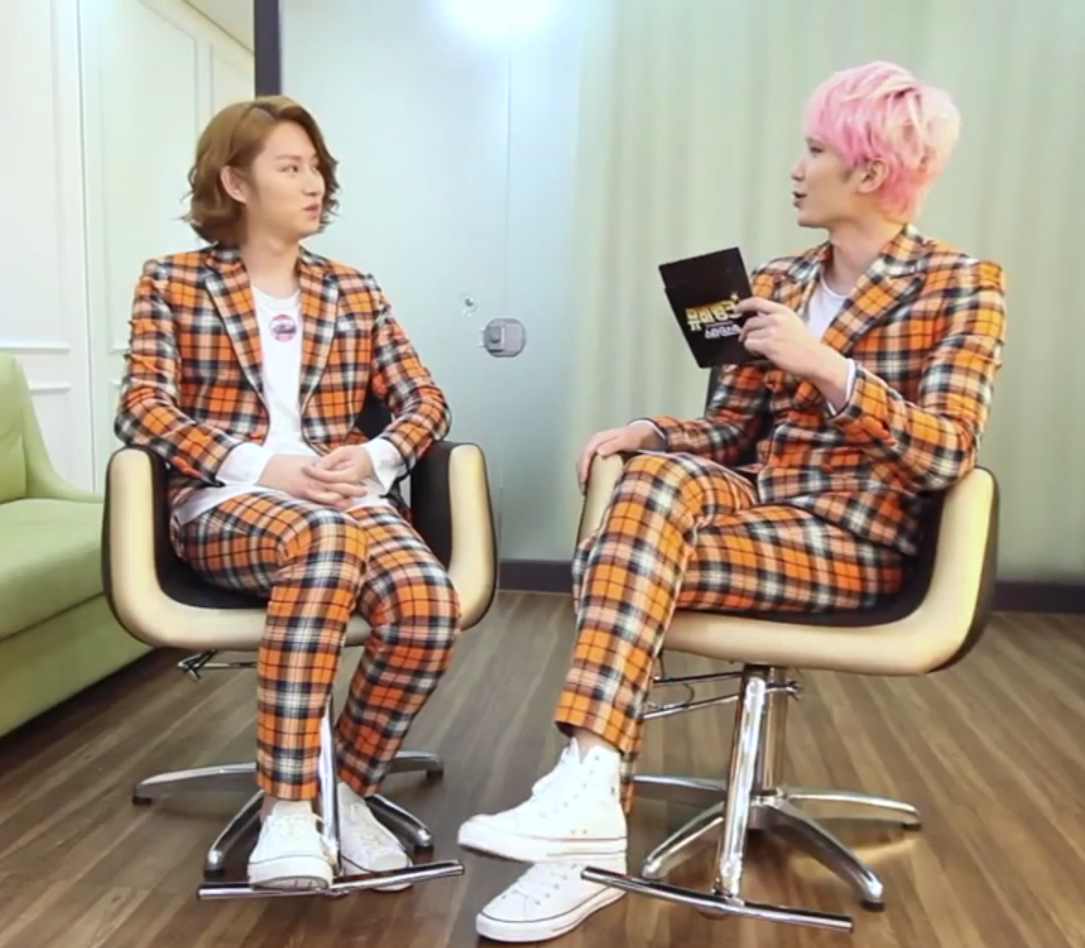
- Kim Hee-chul and Kim Jung-mo in 2015

Background information
- Also known as: M&D (2011–15)
- Origin: Seoul, South Korea
- Genres: Pop rock; dance rock
- Years active: 2011; 2015–2019
- Labels: SM; Label SJ
- Past members: Kim Hee-chul; Kim Jung-mo
- Website: mnd.smtown.com

Kim Heechul & Kim Jungmo (formerly M&D, shortened from Midnight & Dawn or Miari & Dangye-dong) was a South Korean pop rock duo formed by SM Entertainment in 2011. The group was composed of Super Junior's Heechul and TraxX's Kim Jung-mo. Both members decided to write and compose every song the project group released. They'll continuously release music which they can and want to do, regardless of the genre. Their debut single, "Close Ur Mouth" was released in June 2011 under the name M&D. In early July 2016, SM Entertainment announced that the duo would return as Kim Heechul & Kim Jungmo (김희철&김정모).

The group disbanded on April 30, 2019.

== History ==
M&D released their debut digital single "Close Ur Mouth" on June 22, 2011. They also released their music video, starring various artists, including F.T. Island's Choi Jong-hoon and Lee Hong-gi, Supreme Team's Simon D, Miss A's Jia, Beast's Yong Jun-hyung and Comedian Kim Kyung Jin. Their first live performance was at Mnet’s summer awards ceremony 20’s Choice on July 7.

In early-April 2015, SM Entertainment announced that M&D would release their first mini-album Cottage Industry with the lead track "I Wish" digitally on April 16 and physically on April 20. The lead track was also written and composed by the duo. They made their comeback stage on M Countdown on April 16.

Heechul released a collaboration single with Mamamoo's Wheein called "Narcissus" on April 15, 2016, as a part of SM Entertainment's project SM Station. The single was written by Heechul and produced by Jungmo. The music video starred model Kim Jin-kyung. In early July 2016, SM Entertainment announced that the duo would return as Kim Heechul & Kim Jungmo, with a 2nd mini-album Goody Bag, and trot-rock lead track "Ulsanbawi" on July 12. The album consists of six tracks, which were written by Heechul and composed by Jungmo. They also released a music video starring DIA's Chaeyeon.

On April 30, 2019, Jungmo left SM Entertainment, ending M&D permanently.

== Discography ==
Kim Heechul & Kim Jungmo discography
- Studio albums: 0
- Extended plays: 2
- Singles: 4
- Music videos: 4

=== Extended plays ===
Title	Details	Peak chart positions	Sales
Title	Details	KOR	Sales
Cottage Industry	Released: April 16, 2015; Label: SM Entertainment; Formats: CD, digital download	2	KOR: 26,168+
Goody Bag	Released: July 12, 2016; Label: Label SJ, SM Entertainment; Formats: CD, digital download	5	KOR: 10,348+

=== Singles ===
Title	Year	Peak chart positions	Sales	Album(s)
Title	Year	KOR Gaon	Sales	Album(s)
"Close Ur Mouth"	2011	—	KOR: 55,603+	Cottage Industry
"Spring Days of My Life" (Note: Immortal Songs: Singing the Legend (The Hometown of Stars Special). Cover of the single "Spring Days of My Life" by Can.) (with. Bae Ki-sung)	2015	—	—N/a	Non-album single
"I Wish"	2015	100	—N/a	Cottage Industry
"Pro and Amateur" (Note: Cover of the single "Pro and Amateur" by Roo'ra.) (with. Zhou Mi)	2016	—	—N/a	Immortal Songs: Singing the Legend (Roo'ra Special)
"Narcissus" (with. Wheein (from Mamamoo))	2016	140	—N/a	SM Station Season 1 Goody Bag
"Ulsanbawi"	2016	—	—N/a	Goody Bag
"—" denotes releases that did not chart or were not released in that region. "*" denotes the chart did not exist at that time.

== Videography ==
Title	Year	Ref.
"Close Ur Mouth"	2011	
"I Wish"	2015	
"I Wish" (KARAOKE Ver.)	2015	
"Narcissus"	2016	
"Ulsanbawi"	2016	

== Tour and showcase ==
- Kim Heechul & Kim Jungmo Showcase "Dear My Fan" (2016)
- SM Town Live World Tour V (2016)
