= Solar (singer) =

South Korean singer (born 1991)

- Solar in 2026
- Born: Kim Yong-sun; February 21, 1991 (age 35); Seoul, South Korea
- Occupations: Singer; songwriter; actress
- Musical career
- Genres: K-pop; C-pop; T-pop
- Instrument: Vocals
- Years active: 2014–present
- Label: RBW
- Member of: Mamamoo; Mamamoo+

Korean name
- Hangul: 김용선
- Hanja: 金容仙
- RR: Gim Yongseon
- MR: Kim Yongsŏn

Chinese name
- Traditional Chinese: 頌樂
- Simplified Chinese: 颂乐

Signature
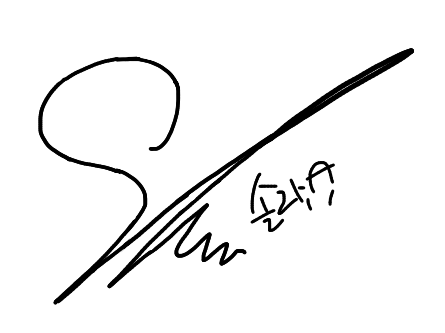

Kim Yong-sun (Korean: 김용선; born February 21, 1991), known professionally as Solar (솔라), is a South Korean singer, songwriter, and actress signed to RBW. She is the leader of the girl group Mamamoo and its sub-unit Mamamoo+. She made her solo debut with the single "Spit It Out" in 2020 and subsequently released the extended plays 容: Face (2022) and Colours (2024). She made her musical theatre debut in Mata Hari in 2022 and later appeared in Notre-Dame de Paris. In 2025, she made her film debut in the horror film The Cursed and released her first Chinese-language single "Floating Free".

== Name ==
Solar's stage name is derived from the solfège notes "sol" and "la". It also references her given name Yong-sun, as "solar" relates to the sun. Her given name in hanja is 容仙, the first character meaning "face" or "appearance" and the second character meaning "immortal".

In Chinese-language promotional materials, she uses 頌樂.

== Early life ==
Solar was born in Gangseo District, Seoul, South Korea, on February 21, 1991. She attended Seoul Management Information High School, where she studied tourism, and subsequently earned an associate degree in international tourism from Hanyang Women's University.

Before pursuing a career in music, Solar considered becoming a flight attendant. She later began auditioning for entertainment agencies and joined RBW after several unsuccessful auditions.

== Career ==
=== 2014–2018: Debut with Mamamoo and Solar Emotion project ===
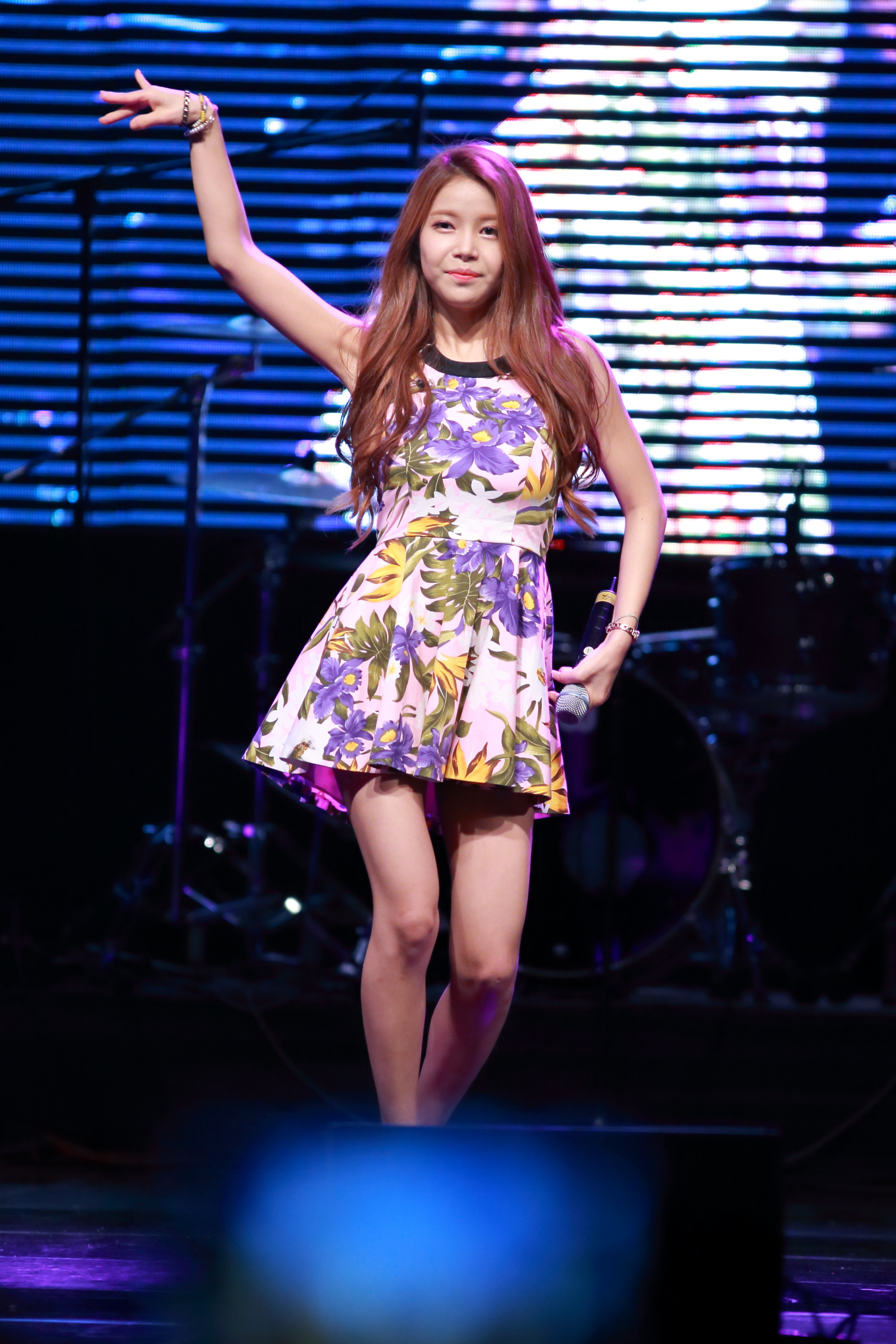
Solar performing in 2015

Solar debuted as a member of Mamamoo on June 18, 2014, alongside Moonbyul, Wheein, and Hwasa. In 2015, she made a cameo appearance in the web drama Imaginary Cat and participated in the television singing competition King of Mask Singer. She also recorded "Star" with Kim Min-jae for the television series Second 20s.

In October 2015, Solar began the Solar Emotion project with a cover of "Lived Like a Fool", followed by "Only Longing Grows" in December. The project continued with "In My Dreams" in 2016, and "Happy People", "Alone People" and "Autumn Letter" in 2017.

In 2016, Solar appeared on the MBC reality television program We Got Married alongside singer Eric Nam. The pair received the Best Couple Award at the 2016 MBC Entertainment Awards, where Solar was also nominated for the Female Rookie Award in Variety Show.

On March 29, 2016, Solar featured in the single "Love Again" by Yang Da-il. On April 2, Solar was announced to be a part of We Got Married with Eric Nam and appeared in episode 316. The pair completed their last appearance on November 19, 2016, in episode 348. On December 29, 2016, the pair won Best Couple Award at the 2016 MBC Entertainment Awards, which was Solar's first variety show award as an entertainer. She was also nominated for Rookie Award (Female) in Variety Show on the same night.

On April 24, 2018, Solar released Solar's Emotion, a collection of recordings from the project that also included her solo version of Mamamoo's "Star Wind Flower Sun", which she wrote. She subsequently held solo concerts in Seoul and Busan.

=== 2019–2021: Solarsido, solo debut and variety show appearances ===
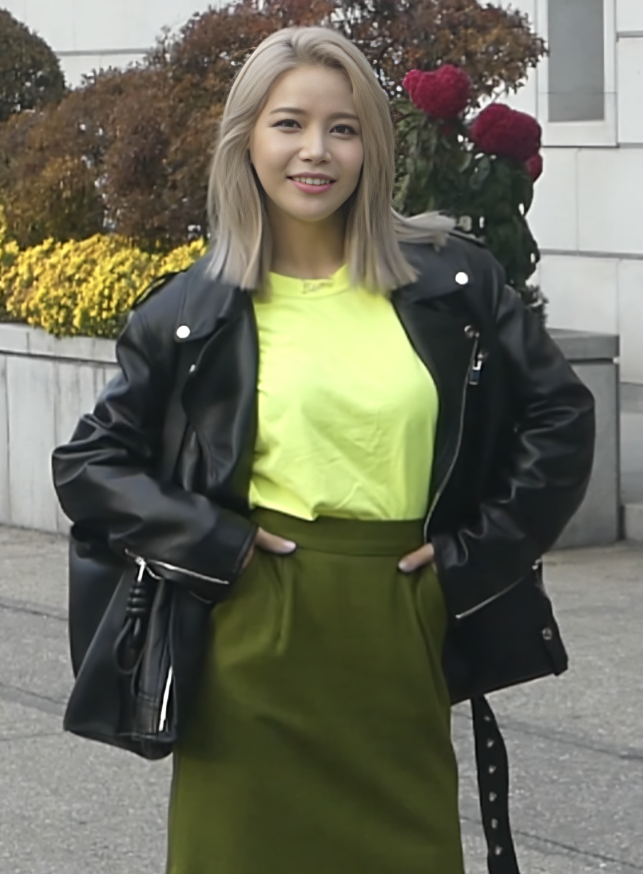
Solar on her way to film for Happy Together 4 in November 2019

On February 21, 2019, Solar launched her personal YouTube channel called "Solarsido" to celebrate her 29th birthday (Korean age). She gained 1 million subscribers in 9 months and revealed on the show Happy Together that her highest earning was approximately 100 million South Korean won in 1 month just from her channel revenue alone. Solar has continued to upload weekly on her channel and gained over 320 million views.

Solar made her official solo debut on April 23, 2020, with the single "Spit It Out". The song earned her first solo music-show win on SBS MTV's The Show.

In November 2020, Solar joined the KBS variety program Boss in the Mirror, on which she continued to make appearances in 2021. She also served as a judge on the music competition programs The Song We Loved, New Singer and Poongryu – Battle Between the Vocalist.

In December 2021, Solar received the Best Entertainer in Show and Variety award at the KBS Entertainment Awards for her television work.

=== 2022–2024: 容: Face, theatre debut and continued OST and competition judging appearances ===
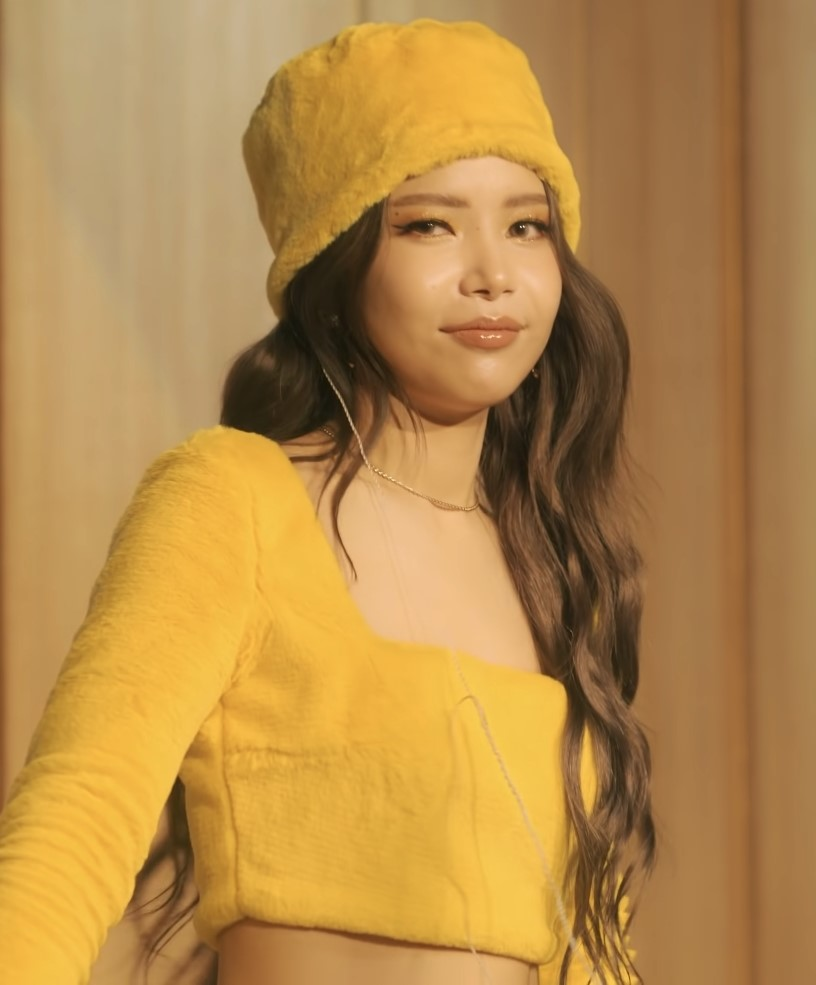
Solar during "Honey" promotions in 2022

On March 16, 2022, Solar released her first extended play, 容: Face, led by the single "Honey". The song was included in Dazed's selection of the best K-pop tracks of 2022.

In May 2022, Solar made her musical theatre debut in the title role of Mata Hari, appearing in the production through August. Her performance was reviewed by South Korean publications including Sports Donga and Star Daily Korea. She subsequently received a nomination for Best Female Newcomer at the 7th Korea Musical Awards.

Solar also appeared as a cast member on the MBC television program Midnight Ghost Story in 2022. She continued her activities as a judge on music competition programs, including A Star Is Born and 2023 Veiled Musician.

In August 2022, Solar and fellow Mamamoo member Moonbyul formed the sub-unit Mamamoo+. The duo released their debut single, "Better", featuring rapper Big Naughty, on August 30.

During 2022 and 2023, Solar contributed recordings to various music projects and television soundtracks, including collaborations with Yesung and songs for The Escape of the Seven. She also joined the judging panel of Mnet's Build Up: Vocal Boy Group Survival and served as a coach on KBS's Make Mate 1 in 2024.

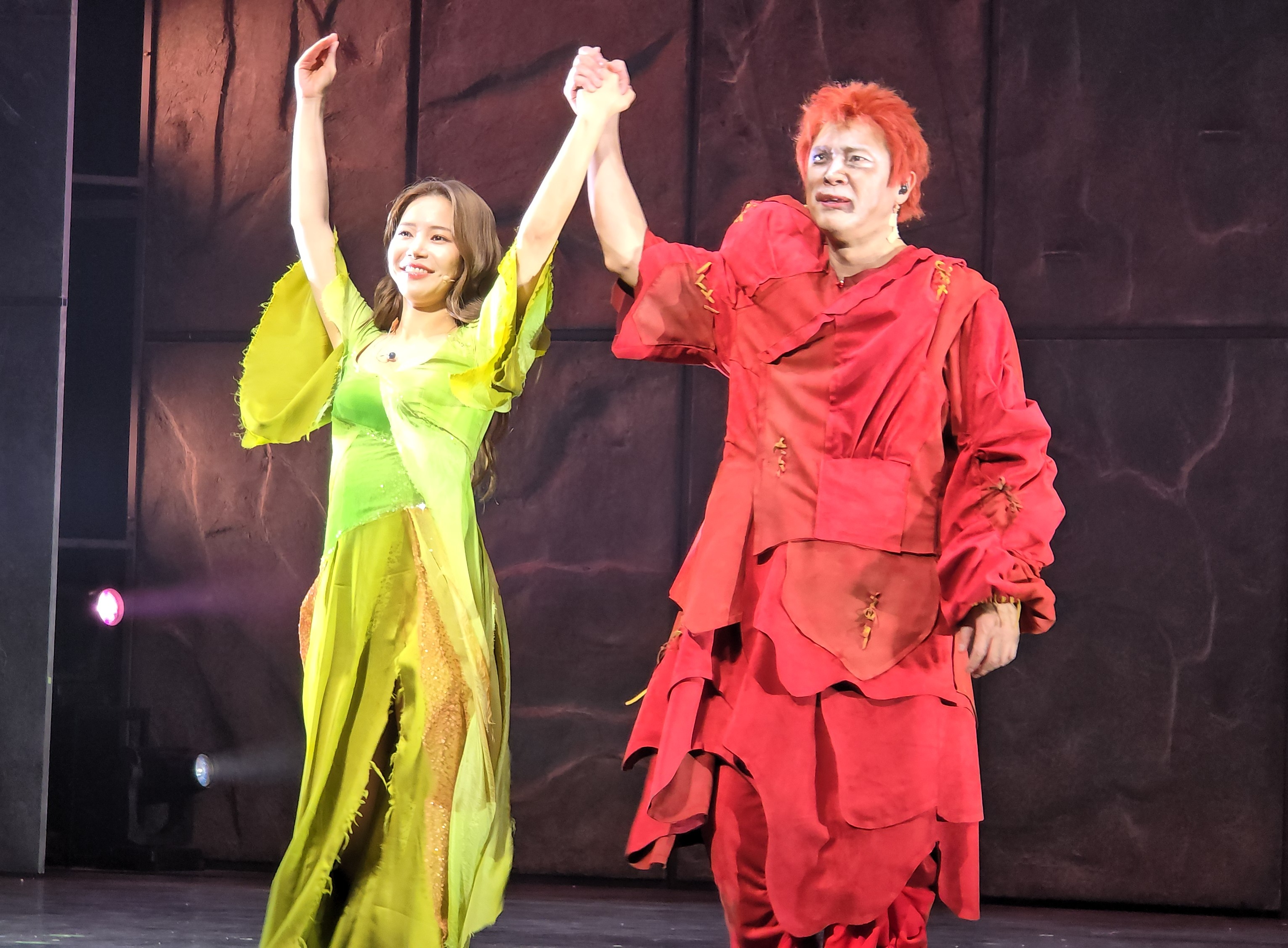
Solar as Esmeralda

In January 2024, Solar began appearing as Esmeralda in the South Korean production of Notre-Dame de Paris. Her performance received coverage from MyDaily and Sports Q. She was subsequently nominated for Female Rookie of the Year at the 18th Daegu International Musical Awards.

=== 2024–present: The return of Solar Emotion, Colours, musicals, film debut and expansion to Chinese market ===
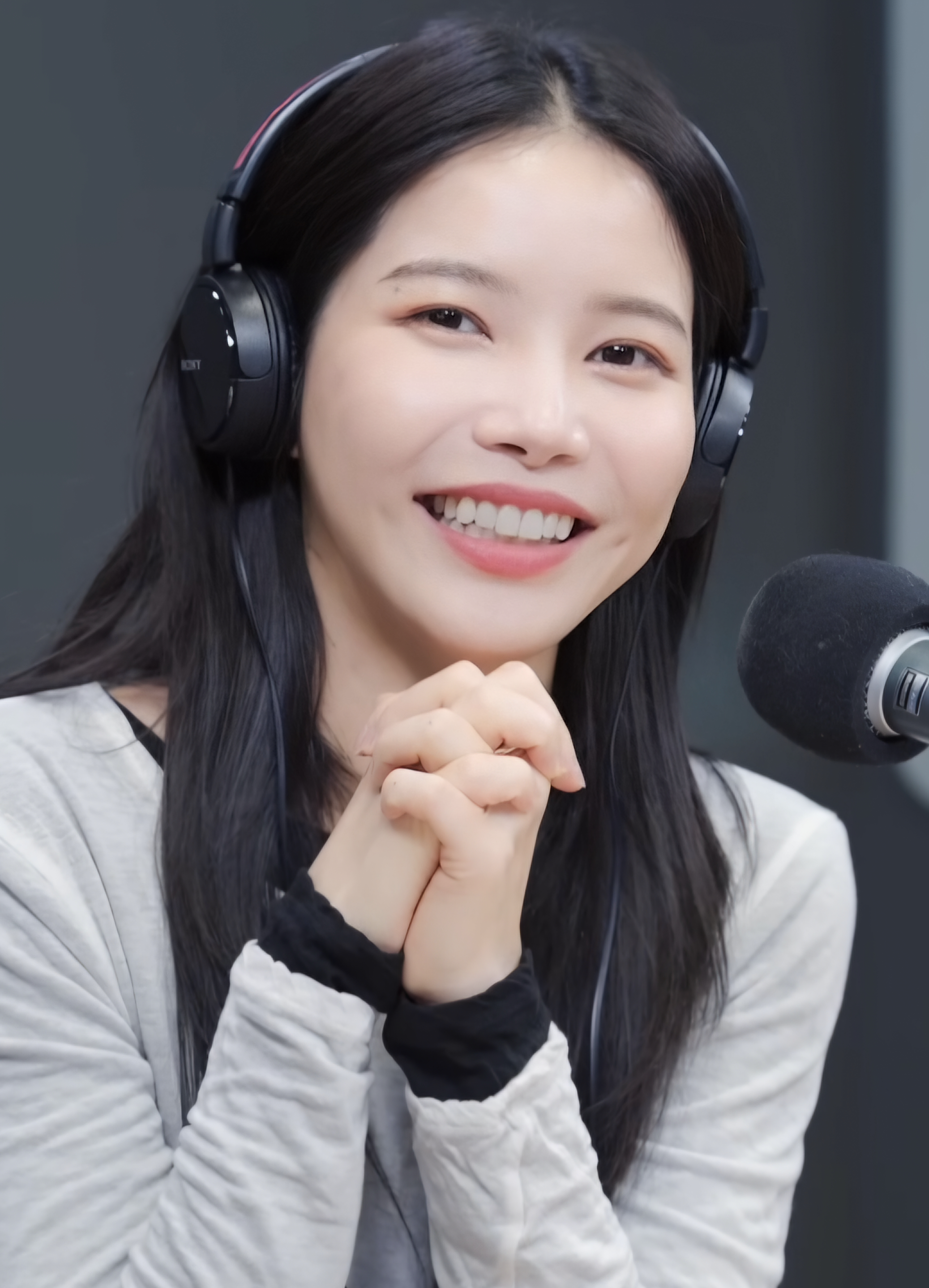
Solar during Colours promotion in 2024

On January 18, 2024, Solar released Solar Emotion Part.7, continuing the Solar Emotion project after a five-year hiatus. The release featured a remake of Kim Kwang-seok's "Love Has Gone" (사랑했지만). Music critic Jang Jun-hwan of IZM rated the recording three out of five stars.

On April 30, 2024, Solar released her second extended play, Colours, featuring the lead single "But I". The song earned her second solo music-show win on The Show on May 7. She subsequently embarked on a concert tour with performances in several Asian cities.

In October 2024, Solar continued the Solar Emotion project with its eighth installment, which included covers of Hikaru Utada's "First Love" and Lee Jang-hee's "Love Letter" (나 그대에게 모두 드리리). Dazed included "Colors", a track from Colours, in its list of the 50 best K-pop tracks of 2024, discussing its representation of LGBTQ+ themes.

In December 2024, Solar reprised the title role in another production of Mata Hari, which continued until March 2025.

On April 2, 2025, Solar released the single album Want with the lead single of the same name. She followed it with her first Chinese-language single, "Floating Free", on June 11. Later that month, she held a solo concert in Taipei, Taiwan.

Solar made her film debut in the horror film The Cursed, directed by Hong Won-ki, which was released in September 2025. She portrayed Mi-yeon, an aspiring writer who visits a rural village.

In October 2025, Solar began her Solaris concert tour, performing in South Korea and several other Asian locations. She also appeared as Sugar Kane in the South Korean production of the musical Sugar, which ran from December 2025 to February 2026.

On March 9, 2026, Solar released the Chinese-language single "Your Own Star" (總有一顆屬於的星球), a collaboration with Taiwanese band Accusefive. She received the Outstanding Vocal Artist of the Year award at the 2026 Weibo Gala in Macau in April. A solo version of "Your Own Star" was subsequently released that month.

In November 2026, Solar released the single "To My 20s".

== Musical style and artistry ==
=== Musical influences ===
Solar has cited British singer-songwriter Amy Winehouse, and South Korean singer BoA among her musical influences. In a 2024 interview with Hit! Magazine, she discussed Winehouse's influence in relation to "Blues", a track from her second extended play, Colours.

=== Vocal style and versatility ===
Solar performing in 2026

Solar has described a preference for powerful vocal performances while also experimenting with different singing techniques. In a 2022 interview with The Korea Times, she discussed the challenges of recording "Honey", which required a lighter vocal delivery and greater use of falsetto than her usual singing approach.

Her musical theatre work has also influenced her vocal technique. In a 2025 interview with The Korea Times, Solar discussed the differences between theatrical singing and recorded pop performances, particularly regarding breath control, vocal projection and microphone use.

=== Musical direction and experimentation ===
Solar's solo recordings have incorporated elements of various musical genres. Her debut single, "Spit It Out" (2020), featured electronic dance influences and Latin guitar arrangements. Her subsequent EP, 容: Face (2022), included the house-influenced single "Honey", while Colours (2024) explored rock, R&B, folk, blues and house music. Solar contributed to the writing and production of five of the six tracks on Colours, including "But I", "Colors", "Empty" and "Easy Peasy". In interviews accompanying the release, she described the EP as an exploration of different musical styles and her interests as a performer.

== Impact and influence ==
In 2016, Solar was ranked as the 18th and 10th most popular K-pop idol according to Women in the age range of 19–29 years old in annual surveys conducted by Gallup Korea. Additionally, in 2017, she ranked 19th most popular K-pop idol in the same surveys conducted by Gallup Korea.

== Other ventures ==
=== Endorsements ===
In 2019, she became a promotional model for Lipton, followed by a partnership with cosmetics brand Blancow in 2020. She renewed her contract with Blancow in 2021, and participated in a promotional campaign for Samsung's Galaxy Book series that year.

On April 25, 2022, Solar was selected to perform "Relaxing in Gyeonggi-do", a promotional song commissioned by Gyeonggi Province as part of an initiative to support residents affected by the COVID-19 pandemic. Her subsequent commercial activities included a promotional partnership with Shin Kong Mitsukoshi in Taiwan in September 2025, and the mobile game Arena of Valor in Taiwan in 2025. In October, she was named a promotional ambassador for the ninth anniversary of Garena's mobile game Arena of Valor, for which she voiced the character Yena, and recorded the theme song "Come Away With Me (Just Waiting for You)".

On March 25, 2026, Solar became a brand ambassador for the Taiwanese game "Star 3 Missing 1" (明星3缺1), appearing in its promotional videos. On October 8, she was named a promotional ambassador for Centrum's women's multivitamin travel pack and appeared in a promotional video and photoshoot published by Elle Taiwan.

=== Philanthropy ===
In September 2021, Solar participated in World Vision's "Girl's 60 Days" campaign, which sought to raise awareness of challenges affecting girls in developing countries, including access to education, early marriage and reproductive health.

== Discography ==
=== Extended plays ===
Title	EP details	Peak chart positions	Sales
Title	EP details	KOR	Sales
Solar Emotion	Released: April 24, 2018; Label: RBW; Formats: LP, digital download, streaming	—	N/A
容: Face	Released: March 16, 2022; Label: RBW; Formats: CD, digital download, streaming	7	KOR: 49,869
Colours	Released: April 30, 2024; Label: RBW; Formats: CD, digital download, streaming	14	KOR: 57,768
"—" denotes releases that did not chart or were not released in that region.

=== Single albums ===
Title	Album details	Peak chart positions	Sales
Title	Album details	KOR	Sales
Spit It Out	Released: April 23, 2020; Label: RBW; Formats: CD, digital download, streaming	2	KOR: 84,568
Solar Emotion Part.7 (Limited Album)	Released: January 18, 2024; Label: RBW; Formats: Cassette tape, digital download, streaming	7	KOR: 13,000
Solar Gamsung Part.8 (Extremely Limited Album)	Released: October 29, 2024; Label: RBW; Formats: Cassette tape, digital download, streaming	38	KOR: 4,196
Want	Released: April 2, 2025; Label: RBW; Formats: QR card, digital download, streaming	13	KOR: 29,934
Floating Free	Released: July 4, 2025; Label: RBW, Seed Music TW 種子音樂; Formats: CD, digital download, streaming	—	—
Your Own Star	Released: March 9, 2026; Label: RBW, Seed Music TW 種子音樂; Formats: Photobook, digital download, streaming	—	—

=== Singles ===
==== As lead artist ====
List of singles as lead artist, showing year released, selected chart positions, and name of the album
Title	Year	Peak chart positions				Album
Title	Year	KOR	KOR Hot	SGP Reg.	US World	Album
"Spit It Out" (뱉어)	2020	71	37	19	6	Non-album single
"Honey" (꿀)	2022	— (Note: "Honey" did not enter the Gaon Digital Chart, but peaked at number 17 on the component Download Chart.)	—	—	13	容 : Face
"But I" (벗 아이)	2024	— (Note: "But I" did not enter the Circle Digital Chart, but peaked at number 40 on the component Download Chart.)	—	—	—	Colours
"Colors"	2024	— (Note: "Colors" did not enter the Circle Digital Chart, but peaked at number 106 on the component Download Chart.)	—	—	—	Colours
"Want" (원트)	2025	— (Note: "Want" did not enter the Circle Digital Chart, but peaked at number 21 on the component Download Chart.)	—	—	—	Non-album singles
"Floating Free" (with 9m88)	2025	—	—	—	—	Non-album singles
"Your Own Star" (總有一顆屬於的星球) (Solar x Accusefive)	2026	—	—	—	—	Non-album singles
"To My 20s"	2026	—	—	—	—	Non-album singles
"—" denotes releases that did not chart.

==== Remakes ====
List of remakes singles, showing year released, selected chart positions, sales figures, and name of the album
Title	Year	Peak chart positions	Sales	Album
Title	Year	KOR	Sales	Album
"Lived Like a Fool" (바보처럼 살았군요)	2015	43	KOR: 68,433	Solar Emotion Part.6
"Only Longing Grows" (그리움만 쌓이네)	2015	69	KOR: 56,223	Solar Emotion Part.6
"In My Dreams" (꿈에)	2016	72	KOR: 29,325	Solar Emotion Part.6
"Happy People" (행복을 주는 사람)	2017	49	KOR: 33,808	Solar Emotion Part.6
"Autumn Letter" (가을 편지)	2017	—	N/A	Solar Emotion Part.6
"Alone People" (외로운 사람들)	2017	— (Note: "Alone People" did not enter the Gaon Digital Chart, but it peaked at number 83 on the component Download Chart.)	KOR: 19,518	Solar Emotion Part.6
"Nada Sou Sou" (눈물이 주룩주룩)	2018	— (Note: "Nada Sou Sou" did not enter the Gaon Digital Chart, but it peaked at number 38 on the component Download Chart.)	N/A	Solar Emotion Part.6
"Love Has Gone" (사란했지만)	2024	— (Note: "Love Has Gone" did not enter the Circle Digital Chart, but it peaked at number 40 on the component Circle Download Chart.)	N/A	Solar Emotion Part.7
"First Love"	2024	—	N/A	Solar Emotion Part.8
"Love Letter" (나 그대에게 모두 드리리)	2024	—	N/A	Solar Emotion Part.8
"—" denotes releases that did not chart.

==== Collaborations ====
List of collaboration singles, showing year released, selected chart positions, sales figures, and name of the album
Title	Year	Peak chart positions	Sales	Album
Title	Year	KOR	Sales	Album
"Coffee & Tea" (with Eddy Kim)	2015	53	KOR: 65,511	Dokkun Project Part.4
"Angel" (with Wheein)	2016	26	KOR: 80,597	Memory
"Mellow" (꿀이 떨어져) (with Hwang Chi-yeul)	2016	48	KOR: 44,110	Fall In, Girl Volume.2
"Honey Bee" (with Luna and Hani)	2017	38	KOR: 66,910	Non-album singles
"Charm of Life" (with Heechul, Shindong, Eunhyuk)	2017	—	N/A	Non-album singles
"A Song from the Past" (이 노랜 꽤 오래된 거야) (with Kassy)	2020	58	N/A	Non-album singles
"Promise U" (Note: remake version of VIBE's 'Promise U' to celebrate VIBE's 20th Anniversary.) (with Moonbyul)	2021	172	N/A	Revibe Vol.1
"Bada Boom" (with Moonbyul, Mismolly & Turns)	2022	— (Note: "Bada Boom" did not enter the Gaon Digital Chart, but it peaked at number 50 on the component Download Chart.)	N/A	Street Dance Girls Fighter (SGF) Special
"After Love" (with Yesung)	2022	— (Note: "After Love" did not enter the Circle Digital Chart but it peaked at number 39 on the component Download Chart.)	N/A	Non-album singles
"—" denotes releases that did not chart.

==== As featured artist ====
List of singles as featured artist, showing year released, selected chart positions, sales figures, and name of the album
Title	Year	Peak chart positions	Sales	Album
Title	Year	KOR	Sales	Album
"Love Again" (Yang Da-il feat. Solar)	2016	— (Note: "Love Again" did not enter the Gaon Digital Chart, but it peaked at number 81 on the component Download Chart.)	KOR: 23,029	Non-album single
"Cloudy" (Kiggen feat. Solar)	2017	—	N/A	Cloudy
"Lie Ya" (Cosmic Girl feat. Solar)	2018	—	N/A	Non-album single
"Leopard" (Ravi feat. Solar)	2019	—	N/A	Nirvana II
"Bubble Love" (MC Mong feat. Solar)	2021	143	N/A	20th Anniversary Edition "Dark Hole"
"—" denotes releases that did not chart.

=== Soundtrack appearances ===
List of soundtrack singles, showing year released, selected chart positions, sales figures, and name of the album
Title	Year	Peak chart positions	Sales	Album
Title	Year	KOR	Sales	Album
"Star" (별) (with Kim Min-jae)	2015	68	KOR: 44,756	Twenty Again OST Part. 6
"Blue Bird"	2020	— (Note: "Blue Bird" did not enter the Gaon Digital Chart, but it peaked at number 155 on the component Download Chart.)	N/A	Run On OST Part. 3
"Adrenaline"	2021	— (Note: "Adrenaline" did not enter the Gaon Digital Chart, but it peaked at number 21 on the component Download Chart.)	N/A	Vincenzo OST Part. 3
"Always, Be with You" (나는 그대고 그대는 나였다)	2021	153	N/A	Lovers of the Red Sky OST Part. 2
"Winterblooming" (겨울꽃)	2021	— (Note: "Winterblooming" did not enter the Gaon Digital Chart, but it peaked at number 55 on the component Download Chart.)	N/A	School 2021 OST
"Dun Dun Dun" (던 던 던)	2022	— (Note: "Dun Dun Dun" did not enter the Gaon Digital Chart but it peaked at number 32 on the component Download Chart.)	N/A	Kill Heel OST Part. 4
"Paradise" (파라다이스)	2022	— (Note: "Paradise" did not enter the Circle Digital Chart but it peaked at number 69 on the component Download Chart.)	N/A	WET! :World EDM Trend OST
"Eternal"	2023	— (Note: "Eternal" did not enter the Circle Digital Chart but it peaked at number 66 on the component Download Chart.)	N/A	Pandora: Beneath the Paradise
"Exit"	2023	— (Note: "Exit" did not enter the Circle Digital Chart but it peaked at number 122 on the component Download Chart.)	N/A	The Escape of the Seven
"Lean"	2024	— (Note: "Lean" did not enter the Circle Digital Chart but it peaked at number 192 on the component Download Chart.)	N/A	Gyeongseong Creature Season 2
"Someone Tell Me"	2025	— (Note: "Someone Tell Me" did not enter the Circle Digital Chart but it peaked at number 79 on the component Download Chart.)	N/A	Moon River
"My Wish"	2026	— (Note: "My Wish" did not enter the Circle Digital Chart but it peaked at number 92 on the component Download Chart.)	N/A	Everyday We Are (Movie)
"—" denotes releases that did not chart.

=== Other charted songs ===
List of other charted songs, showing year released, selected chart positions, sales figures, and name of the album
Title	Year	Peak chart positions	Sales	Album
Title	Year	KOR	Sales	Album
"Like Yesterday" (어제처럼) (with Moonbyul)	2015	54	KOR: 33,185	Two Yoo Project Sugar Man OST Part 6
"Hello" (Solar solo)	2018	— (Note: "Hello" did not enter the Gaon Digital Chart, but it peaked at number 98 on the component Download Chart.)	N/A	Blue;s
"—" denotes releases that did not chart.

=== Composition credits ===
All song credits are adapted from the Korea Music Copyright Association's database unless stated otherwise. Solar has a total of 38 credits as a songwriter and 25 credits as a composer.

Year	Artist	Song	Album	Lyrics	Music
2015	Mamamoo	"Um Oh Ah Yeh" (음오아예)	Pink Funky	Yes	No
2016	Mamamoo	"Taller Than You" (1cm의 자존심)	Melting	Yes	No
2016	Mamamoo	"My Hometown" (고향이)	Melting	Yes	Yes
2016	Mamamoo	"Recipe" (나만의)	Melting	Yes	Yes
2016	Mamamoo	"You're the Best" (넌 is 뭔들)	Melting	Yes	No
2016	Mamamoo	"Décalcomanie" (데칼코마니)	Memory	Yes	No
2016	Mamamoo	"I Love Too" (놓지 않을게)	Memory	Yes	No
2016	Mamamoo	"Memory" (그리고 그리고 그려봐; Draw & Draw & Draw)	Memory	Yes	No
2017	Mamamoo	"Yes I Am" (나로 말할 것 같으면)	Purple	Yes	No
2017	Mamamoo	"Aze Gag" (아재개그)	Purple	Yes	Yes
2018	Mamamoo	"From Winter to Spring" (겨울에서 봄으로) (intro)	Yellow Flower	Yes	Yes
2018	Mamamoo	"Star Wind Flower Sun" (별 바람 꽃 태양)	Yellow Flower	Yes	Yes
2018	Mamamoo	"Sleep in the Car" (잠이라도 자지)	Red Moon	Yes	Yes
2018	Cosmic Girl (feat. Solar)	"Lie Ya"	Non-album single	Yes	Yes
2018	Mamamoo	"No More Drama"	Blue;s	Yes	Yes
2018	Mamamoo	"Hello" (Note: Song was released under Mamamoo, but is a solo track performed by Solar)	Blue;s	Yes	Yes
2019	Mamamoo	"Gogobebe" (고고베베)	White Wind	Yes	No
2019	Ravi (feat. Solar) (prod. Cosmic Boy)	"Leopard"	Nirvana II	Yes	Yes
2019	Mamamoo	"I'm Your Fan"	Reality in Black	Yes	Yes
2020	Solar & Kassy	"A Song from the Past" (이 노랜 꽤 오래된 거야)	Non-album single	Yes	No
2020	Solar	"Spit It Out" (뱉어)	Spit It Out	Yes	Yes
2022	Solar	"Raw"	容: Face	Yes	No
2022	Solar	"Honey" (꿀)	容: Face	Yes	Yes
2022	Solar	"Chap Chap" (찹찹)	容: Face	Yes	Yes
2022	Solar	"Big Booty"	容: Face	Yes	Yes
2022	Mamamoo	"1,2,3 Eoi! " (하나둘셋 어이!)	Mic On	Yes	No
2023	Mamamoo+	"LLL"	Act 1, Scene 1	Yes	Yes
2023	Mamamoo+	"Chico malo" (나쁜놈)	Act 1, Scene 1	Yes	Yes
2023	Mamamoo+	"Dangdang" (댕댕)	Two Rabbits	Yes	Yes
2024	Solar	"Colors"	Colours	Yes	Yes
2024	Solar	"But I" (벗 아이)	Colours	Yes	No
2024	Solar	"Empty" (텅)	Colours	Yes	Yes
2024	Solar	"Easy Peasy"	Colours	Yes	Yes
2024	Solar	"Blues"	Colours	Yes	Yes
2025	Solar	"Floating Free" (with. 9m88)	Non-album singles	Yes	No
2026	Solar	"Your Own Star" (總有一顆屬於的星球)	Non-album singles	Yes	Yes
2026	Mamamoo	"4 Flowers"	4ward	Yes	Yes
2026	Solar	"To My 20s"	To My 20s	Yes	Yes

== Filmography ==
=== Film ===
Year	Title	Role	Ref.
2025	The Cursed	Mi-yeon	

=== Television series ===
Year	Title	Role	Notes	Ref.
2015	Imaginary Cat	Jung Soo-in	First acting debut role	
2016	Entourage	Herself	Cameo (Episode 1)	

=== Television shows ===
Year	Title	Role	Notes	Ref.
2015	King of Mask Singer	Contestant	Episode 21–22 as "Single Hearted Sunflower"	
2016	Duet Song Festival	Contestant	Episode 1, 21, 23–24	
2016	We Got Married	Cast member	Episode 316–348 with Eric Nam	
2020	Gamsung Camping	Cast member	with Park Na-rae, Ahn Young-mi, Son Na-eun, Park So-dam	
2020	Boss in the Mirror	Cast member	Episode 81–85, 107–109, 115–120, 124–126	
2021	The Song We Loved, New Singer	Judge	Episode 1–10	
2021	Poongryu – Battle Between the Vocalist	Judge	Episode 1–12	
2022	Local Dining Table	Special MC	Episode 3–4	
2022	Late Night Ghost Talk Season 2	MC	Episode 49–70	
2022	Star Birth	Star Maker/Judge	Episode 1–11	
2023	Late Night Ghost Talk Season 2	MC	Episode 75–78, 80–81, 100	
2023	WET! : World EDM Trend	Special Judge	Episode 9	
2023	2023 Veiled Musician	Judge	Episode 1–10	
2024	Make My Boyfriend a Handsome Guy	MC and Panelist	Episode 1–10	
2024	Build Up: Vocal Boy Group Survival	Judge	Episode 1–10	
2024	Make Mate 1	Coach/C-Mate	Episode 4–10	
2024	Glam Me Season 3	MC	Episode 1–6	
2025	Glam Me Season 3	MC	Episode 1–6	
2025	Hangout with Yoo	Special Cast	Episode 291, 294–301	
2025	Ttorora	Cast member	Episode 1–7	
2026	Ttorora	Cast member	Episode 1–7	

=== Host ===
Year	Title	Notes	Ref.
2016
2016	2016 Gaon Chart Music Awards	With Leeteuk	
2017	KBS Gayo Daechukje	With Mingyu, Yerin and Kang Daniel	
2019	Genie Music Awards	Ambassador with Yoon Bomi	
2021	KBS Entertainment Awards	Award Presenter with Park Myungsoo	

=== Radio shows ===
Year	Title	Role	Ref.
2022	Dream Radio	DJ Special (2 weeks)	

== Theatre ==
Year	English title	Korean title	Role	Venue	Dates	Ref.
2022	Mata Hari	마타하리	Mata Hari	Charlotte Theater	May 28 – August 15, 2022	
2024	Notre-Dame de Paris	노트르담 드 파리	Esmeralda	Sejong Center	January 24 – March 24, 2024	
2024	Notre-Dame de Paris	노트르담 드 파리	Esmeralda	Sohyang Theater Shinhan Card Hall	April 6–7, 2024	
2024	Notre-Dame de Paris	노트르담 드 파리	Esmeralda	Keimyung Art Center	April 13–14, 2024	
2024	Notre-Dame de Paris	노트르담 드 파리	Esmeralda	Gyeongnam Culture and Arts Center Grand Performance Hall	May 19, 2024	
2024	Notre-Dame de Paris	노트르담 드 파리	Esmeralda	Ulsan Culture and Arts Center Main Performance Hall	May 25, 2024	
2024	Notre-Dame de Paris	노트르담 드 파리	Esmeralda	Daejeon Arts Center Art Hall	June 9, 2024	
2024	Mata Hari	마타하리	Mata Hari	LG Arts Center	December 5, 2024 – March 2, 2025	
2025	Mata Hari	마타하리	Mata Hari	LG Arts Center	December 5, 2024 – March 2, 2025	
2025	Sugar	슈가	Sugar	KEPCO Art Center	December 12, 2025 – February 22, 2026	
2026	Sugar	슈가	Sugar	KEPCO Art Center	December 12, 2025 – February 22, 2026	
2026	Sugar	슈가	Sugar	Cheongju Arts Center	March 27, 2026–March 28, 2026	
2026	Sugar	슈가	Sugar	Busan Citizens' Hall	April 10, 2026	

== Concerts and tours ==
Solar Emotion Concert "Blossom" (2018)
Date	City	Country	Venue
April 27, 2018	Seoul	South Korea	Ewha Womans University
April 28, 2018	Seoul	South Korea	Ewha Womans University
April 29, 2018	Seoul	South Korea	Ewha Womans University
June 16, 2018	Busan	South Korea	Sohyang Theater Shinhan Card Hall
June 17, 2018	Busan	South Korea	Sohyang Theater Shinhan Card Hall

Solar 2nd Concert "Colours" in Asia (2024)
Date	City	Country	Venue
June 1, 2024	Seoul	South Korea	Blue Square Mastercard Hall
June 2, 2024	Seoul	South Korea	Blue Square Mastercard Hall
June 16, 2024	Manila	Philippines	The Theatre at Solaire
June 22, 2024	Kaohsiung	Taiwan	Kaohsiung Music Center
June 28, 2024	Kawasaki	Japan	Cultzz Kawasaki
June 29, 2024	Kawasaki	Japan	Cultzz Kawasaki
July 7, 2024	Hong Kong	China	AsiaWorld–Expo
July 14, 2024	Taipei	Taiwan	Taipei International Convention Center
July 27, 2024	Singapore		Capitol Theatre
October 6, 2024	Macau	China	Broadway Theatre

Solar 1st Talk Concert "Know Your Place/[Topic: Understanding]" (2024–2025)
Date	City	Country	Venue
November 17, 2024	Seoul	South Korea	Yonsei University Centennial Concert Hall
January 12, 2025	Taipei	Taiwan	Legacy Tera

Solar 1st Fan Concert [Floating Free: Between] (2025)
Date	City	Country	Venue
June 22, 2025	Taipei	Taiwan	Taipei International Convention Center

Solar 3rd Concert "Solaris" (2025)
Date	City	Country	Venue
October 11, 2025	Seoul	South Korea	Yonsei University Centennial Concert Hall
October 12, 2025	Seoul	South Korea	Yonsei University Centennial Concert Hall
October 25, 2025	Hong Kong		AXA Dreamland
November 2, 2025	Kaohsiung	Taiwan	Kaohsiung Music Center
November 22, 2025	Singapore		Arena @ Expo
November 30, 2025	Taipei	Taiwan	Taipei International Convention Center

Solar Live Concert [Your Own Star Live] (2026)
Date	City	Country	Venue
May 10, 2026	Taipei	Taiwan	Taipei International Convention Center

== Awards and nominations ==
Name of the award ceremony, year presented, category, nominee of the award, and the result of the nomination
Award ceremony	Year	Category	Nominee / Work	Result	Ref.
Daegu International Musical Festival	2024	Rookie of the Year (Female Actress)	Esmeralda in Notre Dame de Paris	Nominated	
KBS Entertainment Awards	2021	Best Entertainer Award in Variety Show	The Song We Loved, New Singer & Boss in the Mirror	Won	
KBS Entertainment Awards	2021	Excellence Award in Reality Category	The Song We Loved, New Singer & Boss in the Mirror	Nominated	
Korea Musical Awards	2023	Best Newcomer Award (Female Actress)	Mata Hari in Mata Hari	Nominated	
MBC Entertainment Awards	2016	Best Couple	Solar (with Eric Nam) in We Got Married	Won	
MBC Entertainment Awards	2016	Female Rookie Award in Variety Show	We Got Married	Nominated	
Weibo Gala - Weibo Cultural Communication Night	2026	Outstanding Vocal Artist of the Year	Solar	Won	
