= Wheein =

South Korean singer

Whee In
- Whee In in 2026
- Born: Jung Whee-in; April 17, 1995 (age 31); Jeonju, North Jeolla, South Korea
- Occupations: Singer; dancer; songwriter
- Musical career
- Genres: R&B, K-pop
- Instrument: Vocals
- Years active: 2014–present
- Labels: RBW; The L1ve; With Us Entertainment
- Member of: Mamamoo

Korean name
- Hangul: 정휘인
- Hanja: 丁輝人
- RR: Jeong Hwiin
- MR: Chŏng Hwiin

Signature
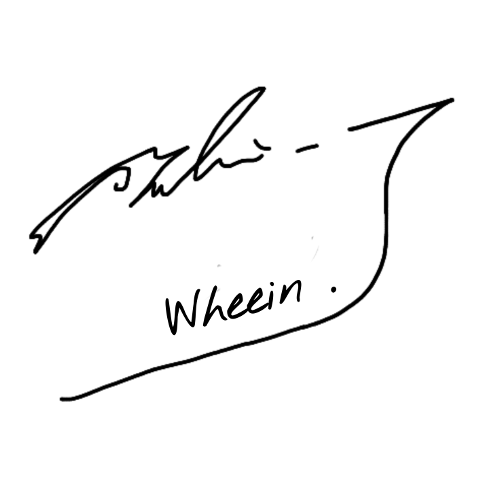

Jung Whee-in (Korean: 정휘인; born April 17, 1995), known as Whee In or Wheein, is a South Korean singer. She rose to prominence in 2014, as a member of the Korean girl group Mamamoo. In 2017, her song "Anymore" with Jung Key, topped the Gaon Charts. In April 2018, she made her debut as a solo artist with her digital single "Easy", peaking at number three in South Korea. In September 2019, Wheein released her first single album Soar.

In 2021, Whee In released her debut EP Redd, which peaked inside the top ten in Korea. In the same year she left RBW, and signed to The L1ve. In 2022, she released her second EP Whee, which reached number four on the Circle Album Chart. In 2023, she released her debut studio album, In the Mood.

== Name ==
Whee-in's given name "휘인" (Hwi-in) was derived from the male lead character of the manhwa "인어공주를 위하여" (For the Mermaid Princess), with the name "조휘인" (Jo Hwi-in). Her mother thought it was a pretty name and named her after the character. Her name in Hanja is written as "輝人", meaning a "shining person".

== Early life ==
Jung Whee-in was born in Jeonju, Jeollabuk-do, South Korea, where she lived with her grandmother as an only child. She graduated from Wonkwang Information Arts High School.

== Career ==
=== 2014–2020: Debut with Mamamoo and solo career ===
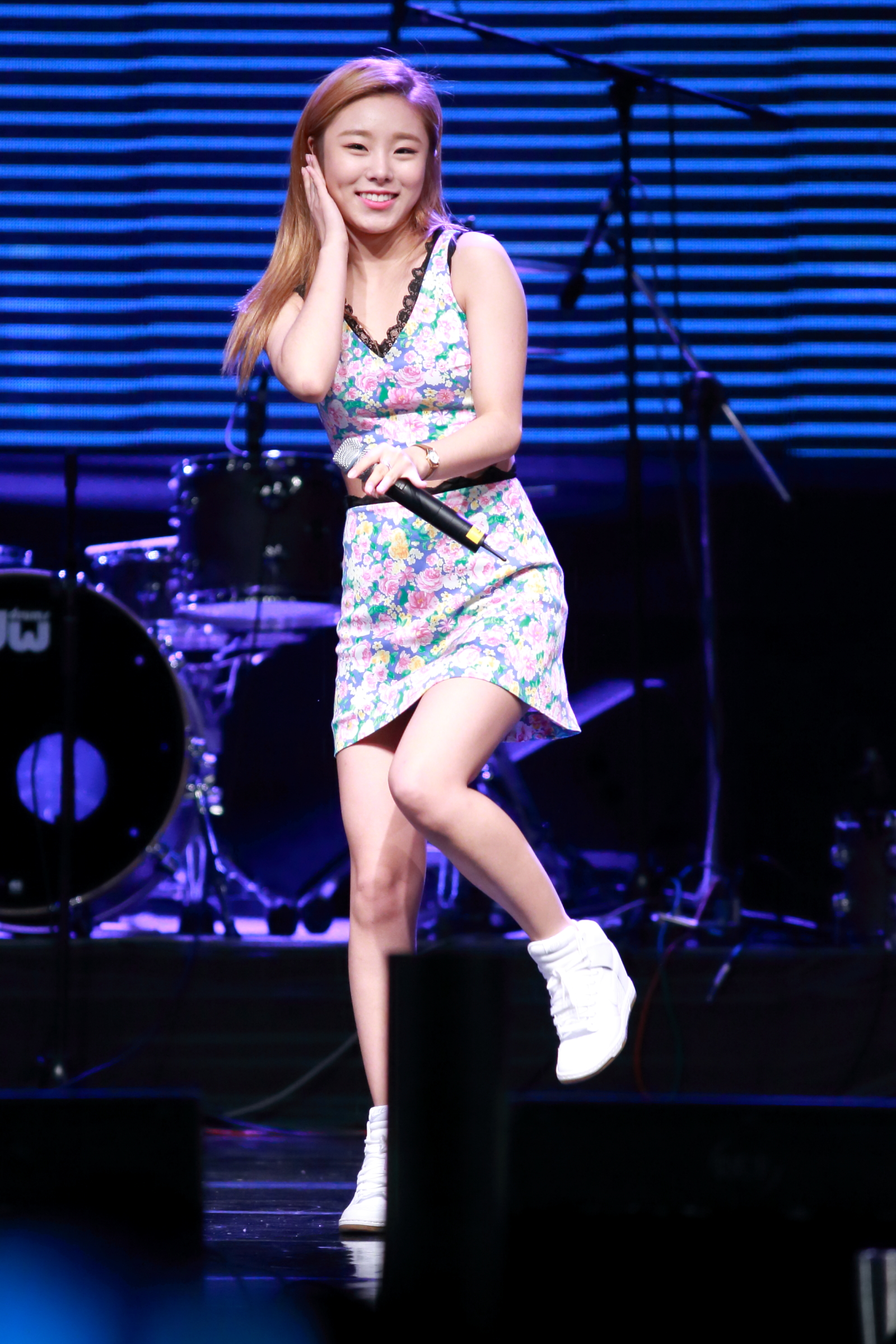
Whee In performing in 2015

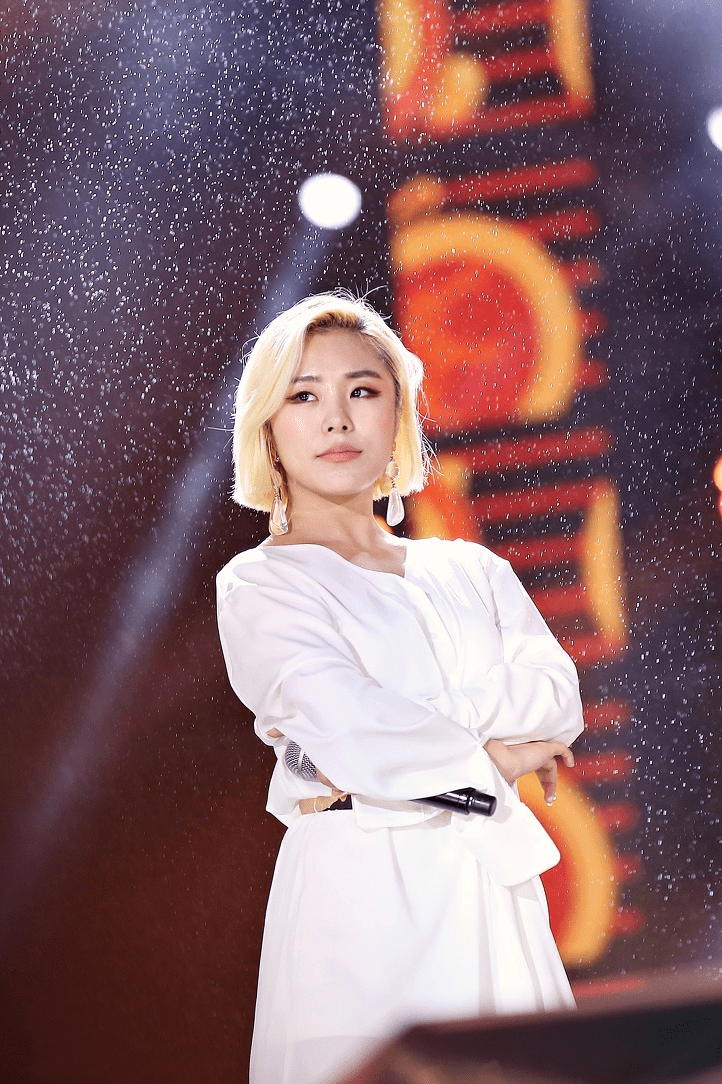
Whee In performing in 2018

In June 2014, Whee In officially debuted as a member of Mamamoo, serving as one of the group's vocalists, in their debut single "Mr. Ambiguous" and EP Hello. She had first appeared in the group's first R&B collaboration "Don't Be Happy", alongside member Solar and featuring Korean singer Bumkey, that January.

Whee In featured on multiple tracks with several artists including Kiggen of Phantom and Standing Egg in 2014; CNBLUE and Louie in 2015; Monsta X and Sandeul in 2016; Jung Key, Jung Min-hyuk and Standing Egg in 2017.

On April 17, 2018, Whee In debuted as a solo artist by releasing her first single album magnolia with the lead single "Easy" featuring rapper Sik-K.

In 2019, she featured in a few more tracks with artists including DinDin and Park Bom and collaborated on a song with Kim Hyun-chul.

On September 4, 2019, she released her second single album Soar, with the single "Good Bye." Wheein's first physical release, Soar peaked at number four on the Gaon Album Chart, selling over 23,000 copies in 2019. The single "Good Bye" debuted on the Billboard World Digital Song Sales chart at position 24.

On May 1, 2020, Whee In released the song "With My Tears" for the tvN drama Hospital Playlist. She featured on a track again for DinDin in May, for Peakboy in August, for Jvde Milez in September and for Basick in December. On September 28, she released a soundtrack titled "Shine On You" for the tvN drama Record of Youth.

=== 2021–2022: Redd, WHEE and other solo activities ===
Whee In's debut EP, Redd, was released on April 13, 2021. It debuted at number seven on the Gaon Album Chart, making it her second top-ten debut on the chart. The EP was the 13th best-selling album of April 2021, with over 72,000 copies sold. Lead single "Water Color" debuted and peaked at number 70 on the Gaon Digital Chart and 15 on the Billboard World Digital Songs Sales chart. On April 23, the English version of "Water Color" was released as a digital single.

On June 11, 2021, Whee In declined to renew her exclusive contract with RBW, and instead signed a deal with the company allowing her to promote with Mamamoo for at least 2 more years. On August 31, she signed an exclusive contract with Ravi's label, The L1ve.

On August 26, 2021, she featured on a track titled "AM PM" from Jay B's first EP SOMO:Fume. On November 19, she released the soundtrack "I wish" for the MBC drama The Red Sleeve. On November 28, she released another soundtrack titled "Ice Cream Love" for the Coupang Play drama One Ordinary Day. On December 11, Whee In and singer Ailee released a duet song titled "Solo Christmas".

On January 16, 2022, Whee In released her second EP WHEE, her first release under The L1ve. It consists of six tracks, including the lead single "Make Me Happy". It debuted number four on the Circle Weekly Album Chart and sold over 81,000 copies.

On February 13, 2022, Whee In released a re-interpretation of The Stray's song "You, You", as a soundtrack for the webtoon Nth Romance. On March 18, she released another soundtrack titled "In Your Days" for the JTBC drama Thirty-Nine.

On April 17, 2022, Whee In held her first solo fanmeeting titled '2022 WHEE IN FANMEETING [D-DAY]' for her birthday. She also released the digital single "D-DAY" on the same day. On May 18, she released the soundtrack "Melody" for the film Gongzza: Gonggi Tazza.

On August 15, 2022, she featured on Ravi's single titled "BYE". On September 2, she released the soundtrack titled "The Only One Have to Forget" for the TVING dating reality show EXchange 2. On November 9, she released the single "Sunny Shower" featuring Colde for Dingo Live. On December 23, she released the soundtrack titled "Cheers!" for the TVING web series Work Later, Drink Now 2. On December 31, Wheein featured in Don Malik's song "Bathtub", alongside Justhis for the Mnet show, Show Me the Money 11.

=== 2023–present: First studio album IN the mood, World tour and more ===
On October 12, 2023, Whee In released her first studio album IN the mood. The album consists of 11 tracks with "17" featuring Hwasa and "Bite Me" featuring rapper HAON. She stated that her previous EP WHEE and the album IN the mood are two parts of her project based on her Instagram ID, "whee_inthemood". It debuted number ten on the Circle Weekly Album Chart and sold over 82,000 copies.

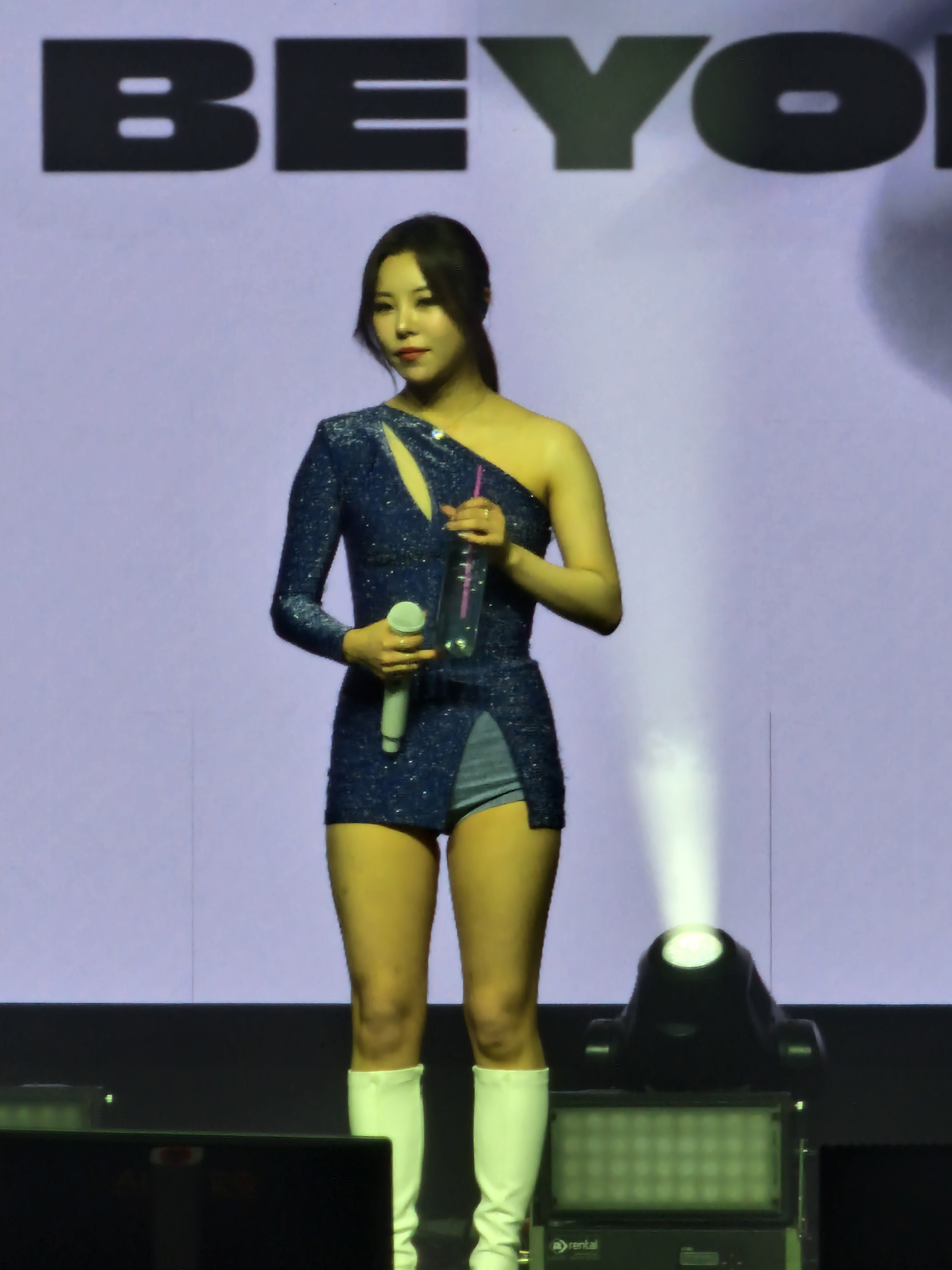
Whee In performing at her 2024 Whee In The Mood [Beyond] World Tour.

On January 3, 2024, Whee In announced her debut solo world tour, 'Whee In The Mood [Beyond]'. On February 15, she released a digital single titled "Wheee" produced by Young K and Na Sang-hyun. The world tour 'Whee In The Mood [Beyond]', began in Seoul with concerts held on February 24 and 25. On March 15, she released the soundtrack "Rainy Season" for the re-release of the 2022 Japanese film, The Last 10 Years. The Asian leg of her tour commenced on March 26, with a show in Hong Kong followed by concerts in Bangkok, Manila, Taipei and Tokyo.

On April 17, a double LP titled WHEE IN the mood was announced. The LP consisted of tracks from her previous EP WHEE and her studio album IN the mood.

Her Europe and USA leg of the tour was held from May 9 to June 4 with shows in Warsaw, Helsinki, Tilburg, San Francisco, Los Angeles, Dallas, Houston, Orlando, Fort Lauderdale, Washington D.C. and Brooklyn. On May 15, her collaboration soundtrack with Moonbyul "Frankly Speaking" for the JTBC drama Frankly Speaking was released. On July 20 and 21, she held encore concerts titled 'WHEE IN THE MOOD [BEYOND]: ENCORE' in Seoul. On August 3, The L1ve announced that her exclusive contract with them had ended.

On July 25, 2025, With Us Entertainment, a subsidiary of Around Us Entertainment, announced that Whee In had signed an exclusive contract with them and that they would make sure she can actively promote both as a solo artist and as a member of Mamamoo.

On August 5, Whee In announced her first fan concert tour, 'OWHEECE', in Asia.

== Discography ==
=== Studio albums ===
Title	Details	Peak chart positions	Sales
Title	Details	KOR	Sales
In the Mood	Released: October 12, 2023; Label: The L1ve; Formats: CD, digital download, streaming	10	KOR: 85,209

=== Extended plays ===
Title	Details	Peak chart positions	Sales
Title	Details	KOR	Sales
Redd	Released: April 13, 2021; Label: RBW; Formats: CD, digital download, streaming	7	KOR: 76,700
Whee	Released: January 16, 2022; Label: The L1ve; Formats: CD, digital download, streaming	4	KOR: 81,610

=== Single albums ===
Title	Details	Peak chart positions	Sales
Title	Details	KOR	Sales
Soar	Released: September 4, 2019; Label: RBW; Formats: CD, digital download, streaming	4	KOR: 23,000
Adagio	Released: April 16, 2026; Label: With Us; Formats: CD, digital download, streaming	24	KOR: 19,680

=== Singles ===
==== As lead artist ====
List of singles, with selected chart positions, showing year released and album name
Title	Year	Peak chart positions			Sales	Album
Title	Year	KOR	KOR Billb.	US World	Sales	Album
"Narcissus" (나르시스) (with Kim Heechul & Kim Jungmo)	2016	140	—	—	—N/a	SM Station Season 1 Goody Bag
"Angel" (with Solar)	2016	26	—	—	KOR: 80,500	Memory
"Da Ra Da" (다라다) (with Jeff Bernat & B.O.)	2017	80	—	—	KOR: 74,900	Purple
"Easy" (featuring Sik-K)	2018	36	—	—	—N/a	Soar
"Loving One Person" (with Hwasa and Kim Hyun-chul)	2019	—	—	—	—N/a	10th – Preview
"Good Bye" (헤어지자)	2019	3	10	24	—N/a	Soar
"Water Color"	2021	70	—	15	—N/a	Redd
"Solo Christmas" (홀로 크리스마스) (with Ailee)	2021	90	—	—	—N/a	Non-album single
"Make Me Happy" (오묘해)	2022	65	72	—	—N/a	Whee
"D-Day"	2022	141	—	—	—N/a	Non-album singles
"Bye" (with Ravi)	2022	— (Note: "BYE" did not enter the Circle Digital Chart, but it peaked at number 69 on the Circle Download Chart.)	—	—	—N/a	Non-album singles
"In the Mood"	2023	— (Note: "In the Mood" did not enter the Circle Digital Chart, but it peaked at number 32 on the component Circle Download chart.)	—	—	—N/a	In the Mood
"Wheee"	2024	— (Note: "Whee" did not enter the Circle Digital Chart but entered the component Circle Download Chart at number 41.)	—	—	—N/a	Non-album single
"Coco Water"	2024	— (Note: "Coco Water" did not enter the Circle Digital Chart, but it peaked at number 87 on the component Circle Download Chart.)	—	—	—N/a	Non-album single
"Aftertaste" (이별의 맛)	2025	— (Note: "Aftertaste" did not enter the Circle Digital Chart, but it peaked at number 28 on the component Circle Download Chart.)	—	—	—N/a	Non-album single
"Butterfly" (세 번의 날갯짓을 약속해)	2025	— (Note: "Butterfly" did not enter the Circle Digital Chart, but it peaked at number 91 on the component Circle Download Chart.)	—	—	—N/a	Non-album single
"The Symphony Of Fxxkboys"	2026	—	—	—	—N/a	Adagio
"—" denotes releases that did not chart or were not released in that region.

==== As featured artist ====
Title	Year	Peak chart positions	Sales	Album
Title	Year	KOR	Sales	Album
"Under Age's Song" (Phantom featuring Whee In)	2014	—	—N/a	Phantom Power
"The Sunlight Hurts" (햇살이 아파) (Standing Egg featuring Whee In, YoonDak Obroject)	2014	61	KOR: 24,000	Like
"Domino" (CNBLUE featuring Whee In)	2015	—	KOR: 14,000	2gether
"Please Just Go" (그냥가요) (Louie featuring Whee In)	2015	25	KOR: 116,000	Non-album single
"Ex Girl" (Monsta X featuring Whee In)	2016	118	KOR: 23,000	The Clan Pt. 1 Lost
"Hey! " (야! ) (Sandeul featuring Whee In)	2016	—	KOR: 22,700	Stay As You Are
"Anymore" (부담이 돼) (Jung Key featuring Whee In)	2017	1	KOR: 1,073,000	Empty
"Holy-Day" (Jung Min-hyuk featuring Whee In)	2017	—	—N/a	Non-album single
"Love or Like" (Standing Egg featuring Whee In)	2017	—	—N/a	Dramatic
"Miss U" (Jude featuring Whee In)	2018	—	—N/a	Non-album single
"Tear Drops" (주르륵) (DinDin featuring Whee In)	2019	—	—N/a	Non-album single
"4:44" (Park Bom featuring Whee In)	2019	84	—N/a	Blue Rose
"do do do do" (돼버릴거야) Prod. Giriboy (DinDin featuring Whee In)	2020	—	—N/a	Non-album single
"Diet" (Peakboy featuring Whee In)	2020	—	—N/a	Non-album single
"눈이 오면 mmm" (Basick featuring Whee In)	2020	—	—N/a	Non-album single
"AM PM" Prod. Gray (Jay B featuring Whee In)	2021	—	—N/a	SOMO:Fume
"—" denotes releases that did not chart or were not released in that region.

=== Soundtrack appearances ===
Title	Year	Peak chart positions		Sales	Album
Title	Year	KOR	KOR Hot	Sales	Album
"Shadow" (그림자)	2017	31	—	KOR: 135,600	Yellow OST
"With My Tears" (내 눈물모아)	2020	18	13	—N/a	Hospital Playlist OST
"Shine On You" (그렇게 넌 내게 빛나)	2020	172	—	—N/a	Record of Youth OST
"I Wish" (바라고 바라)	2021	— (Note: "I Wish" did not enter the Gaon Digital Chart, but it peaked at number 70 on the Gaon Download Chart.)	—	—N/a	The Red Sleeve OST
"Ice Cream Love"	2021	— (Note: "Ice Cream Love" did not enter the Gaon Digital Chart, but it peaked at number 88 on the Gaon Download Chart.)	—	—N/a	One Ordinary Day OST
"You, You" (너, 너)	2022	13	80	—N/a	Nth Romance OST
"In Your Days" (너의 하루 끝에)	2022	— (Note: "In Your Days" did not enter the Gaon Digital Chart, but it peaked at number 54 on the Gaon Download Chart.)	—	—N/a	Thirty-Nine OST
"Melody"	2022	—	—	—N/a	Gongzza OST (Note: Movie.-ua)
"The Only One Have to Forget"	2022	—	—	—N/a	EXchange2 OST
"Cheers! "	2022	—	—	—N/a	Work Later, Drink Now 2 OST
"Rainy Season" (장마)	2024	—	—	—N/a	The Last 10 Years OST
"Frankly Speaking" (with Moonbyul)	2024	—	—	—N/a	Frankly Speaking OST
"I Feel It Now"	2024	—	—	—N/a	When the Phone Rings OST
"Blossom Flower"	2025	—	—	—N/a	It's Okay!' OST
"Stay in me" (내 안에 머물러요)" (with Bang Ye-dam)	2026	—	—	—N/a	See You at Work Tomorrow! OST
"—" denotes releases that did not chart or were not released in that region.

=== Other charted songs ===
Title	Year	Peak chart positions	Sales	Album
Title	Year	KOR	Sales	Album
"Moderato" (featuring Hash Swan)	2016	— (Note: "Moderato" did not enter the Gaon Digital Chart, but it peaked at number 42 on the component Download Chart.)	KOR: 25,000	Memory
"25"	2019	183	N/A	White Wind
"Trash" (featuring pH-1)	2021	— (Note: "Trash" did not enter the Gaon Digital Chart, but it peaked at number 47 on the Gaon Download Chart.)	N/A	Redd
"Ohoo" (오후)	2021	— (Note: "Ohoo" did not enter the Gaon Digital Chart, but it peaked at number 48 on the Gaon Download Chart.-ua)	N/A	Redd
"Butterfly" (featuring G.Soul)	2021	— (Note: "Butterfly" did not enter the Gaon Digital Chart, but it peaked at number 49 on the Gaon Download Chart.-ua)	N/A	Redd
"Springtime" (봄이 너에게)	2021	— (Note: "Springtime" did not enter the Gaon Digital Chart, but it peaked at number 50 on the Gaon Download Chart.-ua)	N/A	Redd
"No Thanks"	2021	— (Note: "No Thanks" did not enter the Gaon Digital Chart, but it peaked at number 51 on the Gaon Download Chart.-ua)	N/A	Redd
"Pink Cloud"	2022	— (Note: "Pink Cloud" did not enter the Gaon Digital Chart, but it peaked at number 59 on the Gaon Download Chart.)	N/A	Whee
"Letter Filled with Light"	2022	— (Note: "Letter Filled with Light" did not enter the Gaon Digital Chart, but it peaked at number 62 on the Gaon Download Chart.-ua)	N/A	Whee
"Deserve (Interlude)"	2022	— (Note: "Deserve (Interlude)" did not enter the Gaon Digital Chart, but it peaked at number 101 on the Gaon Download Chart.-ua)	N/A	Whee
"Pastel" (파스텔)	2022	— (Note: "Pastel" did not enter the Gaon Digital Chart, but it peaked at number 75 on the Gaon Download Chart.-ua)	N/A	Whee
"Paraglide"	2022	— (Note: "Paraglide" did not enter the Gaon Digital Chart, but it peaked at number 80 on the Gaon Download Chart.-ua)	N/A	Whee
"I Know I Know I Know (Beyond)"	2023	— (Note: "I Know I Know I Know (Beyond)" did not enter the Circle Digital Chart, but it peaked at number 101 on the Circle Download Chart.)	N/A	In the Mood
"17" (featuring Hwasa)	2023	— (Note: "17" did not enter the Circle Digital Chart, but it peaked at number 86 on the Circle Download Chart.)	N/A	In the Mood
"Spark" (불꽃)	2023	— (Note: "17" did not enter the Circle Digital Chart, but it peaked at number 95 on the Circle Download Chart.)	N/A	In the Mood
"Bite Me" (featuring Haon)	2023	— (Note: "Bite Me" did not enter the Circle Digital Chart, but it peaked at number 93 on the Circle Download Chart.)	N/A	In the Mood
"Dance 4 You"	2023	— (Note: "Dance 4 You" did not enter the Circle Digital Chart, but it peaked at number 110 on the Circle Download Chart.)	N/A	In the Mood
"On the Island"	2023	— (Note: "On the Island" did not enter the Circle Digital Chart, but it peaked at number 107 on the Circle Download Chart.)	N/A	In the Mood
"Aphrodite"	2023	— (Note: "Aphrodite" did not enter the Circle Digital Chart, but it peaked at number 112 on the Circle Download Chart.)	N/A	In the Mood
"Breeze" (숨결)	2023	— (Note: "Breeze" did not enter the Circle Digital Chart, but it peaked at number 106 on the Circle Download Chart.)	N/A	In the Mood
"Bittersweet"	2023	— (Note: "Bittersweet" did not enter the Circle Digital Chart, but it peaked at number 108 on the Circle Download Chart.)	N/A	In the Mood
"Here I Am"	2023	— (Note: "Here I Am" did not enter the Circle Digital Chart, but it peaked at number 99 on the Circle Download Chart.)	N/A	In the Mood
"—" denotes releases that did not chart or were not released in that region.

=== Composition credits ===
All song credits are adapted from the Korea Music Copyright Association's database unless stated otherwise.

Year	Artist	Song	Album	Lyrics	Music
2016	Mamamoo	"My Hometown" (고향이)	Melting	Yes	No
2016	Mamamoo (feat. Hash Swan)	"Moderato" (Note: Song was released under Mamamoo, but is a solo track performed by Whee In)	Memory	Yes	Yes
2017	Jung Min-hyuk (feat. Whee In)	"Holy-Day"	Non-album single	Yes	No
2019	Mamamoo	"25" (Note: Song was released under Mamamoo, but is a solo track performed by Whee In)	White Wind	Yes	No
2020	Jvde Milez (feat. Whee In) (prod. Nod)	"Miss U"	MilezAway	Yes	No
2021	Whee In (feat. pH-1)	"Trash"	Redd	No	Yes
2021	Whee In	"Ohoo"	Redd	Yes	No
2021	Whee In	"Springtime" (봄이 너에게)	Redd	Yes	Yes
2022	Whee In	"Letter Filled with Light"	Whee	Yes	No
2023	Whee In	"Here I Am"	In the mood	Yes	No

== Filmography ==
=== Television shows ===
Year	Title	Role	Notes	Ref.
2015	100 People, 100 Songs	Contestant	Episode 29–30 (with Hwasa)	
2015	Duet Song Festival	Contestant	Pilot 1 (Chuseok Special)	
2016	Duet Song Festival	Contestant	Pilot 2 (Lunar New Year Special)	
2016	King of Mask Singer	Contestant	Episode 55–56 (As 'Like a Half Moon')	
2016	Singing Battle	Contestant	Episode 8–9 (with Solar)	
2017	Duet Song Festival	Contestant	Episode 35–36	
2018	Secret Unnie	Cast member	Episode 2–6	

=== Radio shows ===
Year	Title	Network	Role	Notes	Ref.
2022	Dream Radio	MBC FM4U	Special DJ	March 14–20, 2022	

=== Music videos ===
Title	Year	Director	Ref.
"Easy"	2018	Hong Won Ki (Zanybros)	
"25"	2019	Park Woo Sang (RBW)	
"Good Bye" (헤어지자)	2019	Hong Won Ki, Hor Jin Hyung (Zanybros)	
"Water Color"	2021	Hobin (a HOBIN film)	
"Make Me Happy" (오묘해)	2022	Sungwhi (nvrmnd)	
"In The Mood"	2023	Lee Jeongyeon (Desert Beagle)	
"coco water"	2024	Desert Beagle	

== Tours and concerts ==
=== 2024 Whee In 1st WORLD TOUR: WHEE IN THE MOOD [BEYOND] ===
Concert dates
Date	City	Country	Venue
Asia
February 24, 2024	Seoul	South Korea	Blue Square Mastercard Hall
February 25, 2024	Seoul	South Korea	Blue Square Mastercard Hall
March 26, 2024	Hong Kong	China	Star Hall
April 6, 2024	Bangkok	Thailand	Bhiraj Hall
April 13, 2024	Manila	Philippines	SM North EDSA Sky Dome
April 20, 2024	Taipei	Taiwan	Taipei International Convention Center
April 21, 2024	Taipei	Taiwan	Taipei International Convention Center
May 1, 2024	Tokyo	Japan	Zepp DiverCity
Europe
May 9, 2024	Warsaw	Poland	Progresja
May 12, 2024	Helsinki	Finland	Kulttuuritalo
May 14, 2024	Tilburg	Netherlands	013
North America
May 17, 2024	San Francisco	United States	Palace of Fine Arts
May 19, 2024	Los Angeles	United States	Orpheum Theatre
May 22, 2024	Dallas	United States	Majestic Theatre
May 24, 2024	Houston	United States	713 Music Hall
May 27, 2024	Orlando	United States	Hard Rock Live
May 29, 2024	Fort Lauderdale	United States	Broward Center for the Performing Arts
June 2, 2024	Washington D.C.	United States	Warner Theatre
June 4, 2024	Brooklyn	United States	Brooklyn Paramount Theatre
Encores
July 20, 2024	Seoul	South Korea	Olympic Hall
July 21, 2024	Seoul	South Korea	Olympic Hall
August 24, 2024	Kaohsiung	Taiwan	Kaohsiung Music Center
August 25, 2024	Kaohsiung	Taiwan	Kaohsiung Music Center

=== Fanmeetings ===
==== 2022 Whee In Fanmeeting [D-Day] ====
Date	City	Country	Venue
April 22, 2022	Seoul	South Korea	Yes24 Live Hall

==== 2025 Whee In Fan-Con Tour [OWHEECE] in Asia ====
Date	City	Country	Venue
September 13, 2025	Seoul	South Korea	Yes24 Live Hall
September 14, 2025	Seoul	South Korea	Yes24 Live Hall
October 25, 2025	Taipei	Taiwan	Taipei International Convention Center
November 1, 2025	Singapore		Capitol Theatre
November 8, 2025	Manila	Philippines	SM North EDSA Skydome
November 30, 2025	Macau	China	—
December 13, 2025	Kaohsiung	Taiwan	—

== Awards and nominations ==
Name of the award ceremony, year presented, edition, category, nominee of the award, and the result of the nomination
Award ceremony	Year	Category	Nominee(s) / Work(s)	Result	Ref.
APAN Music Awards	2020	Idol Champ Global Pick – Solo	Whee In	Nominated	
APAN Star Awards	2020	Best OST Award	"With My Tears"	Nominated	
Gaon Chart Music Awards	2019	Artist of the Year – Digital Music (September)	"Good Bye"	Nominated	
Seoul Music Awards	2020	OST Award	"With My Tears"	Nominated	
Seoul Music Awards	2022	OST Award	"You,You"	Nominated	
