= Mamamoo discography =

Recording artist discography

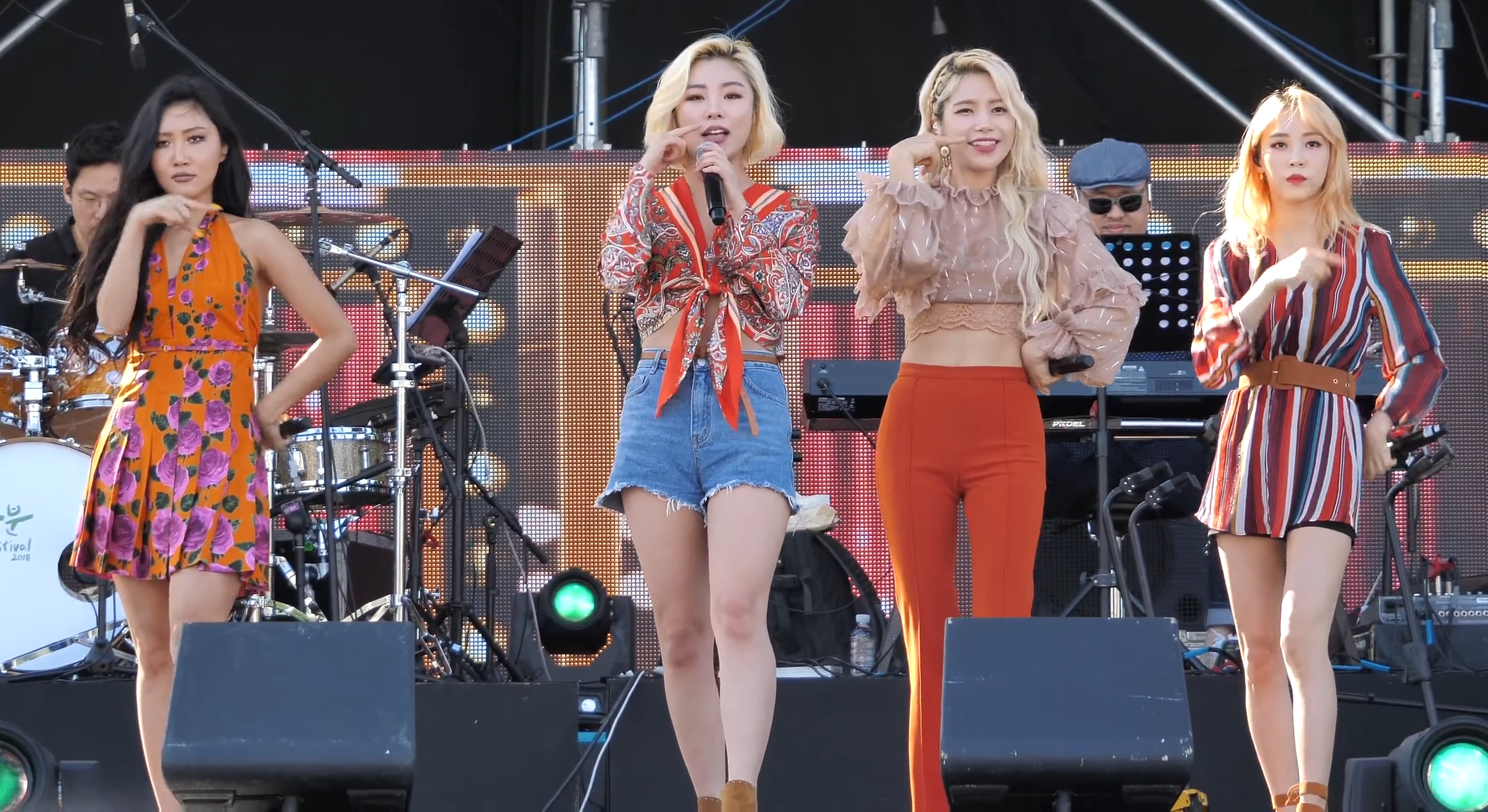
- Mamamoo performing at the Holgabun Festival in May 2018.
- Studio albums: 3
- EPs: 12
- Compilation albums: 1
- Singles: 25
- Music videos: 44
- Promotional singles: 17

South Korean four-member girl group Mamamoo have released three studio albums (including two Korean and one Japanese), one compilation album, one single album, twelve extended plays, 26 singles (including two as a featured artist), and 17 promotional singles since their debut under RBW in June 2014. As of February 2021, the group has sold nearly 1.2 million albums worldwide.

Prior to their official debut, Mamamoo released several collaborations throughout early 2014, including "Don't Be Happy" with Bumkey, "Peppermint Chocolate" with K.Will and featuring Wheesung, and "Heeheehaheho" with Geeks. The most successful of these, "Peppermint Chocolate" reached a peak of number ten on the Gaon Digital Chart and seven on the Billboard K-Pop Hot 100 and has sold over 600,000 digital copies. On June 18, 2014, the group released their debut extended play (EP), Hello, and official debut single, "Mr. Ambiguous" (Mr. 애매모호). Their first televised performance, on Mnet's M Countdown, aired the next day. In November, the group came back with their second EP, Piano Man, and the lead single of the same name. In April 2015, the group released "Ahh Oop!" (아훕!), a collaboration with label-mate Esna, as the first single from their upcoming third EP.

Mamamoo released Pink Funky, their third EP, and the single, "Um Oh Ah Yeh" (음오아예), on June 19, 2015. "Um Oh Ah Yeh" peaked at number three on the Gaon Digital Chart, making it the group's first top-three single. In September, the group released "Girl Crush" as a promotional single for the video game Innisia Nest. Mamamoo released "I Miss You" as the first single from their upcoming debut studio album, Melting, on January 29, 2016, followed by "Taller Than You" on February 12.

Melting was released with a third official single, "You're the Best" (넌 is 뭔들), on February 26, 2016. The album peaked at number two on the Gaon Album Chart, while "You're the Best" peaked atop the Digital Chart, making it their first number-one on the chart. On March 6, "You're the Best" earned the group their first-ever music show win, on SBS Inkigayo, and eight wins in total. In April, they released the single, "Woo Hoo", for LG G5 and Friends, and in August, they released a digital single album, consisting of sub-unit tracks "Angel" and "Dab Dab". That September, they released "New York" as a pre-release single from their next EP. Their fourth EP, titled Memory, was released with another single, "Décalcomanie", in November 2016. In June 2017, Mamamoo released their fifth EP, Purple, and its lead single, "Yes I Am".

In 2018, Mamamoo embarked on their "Four Seasons, Four Colors" series of albums, kicking the project off with pre-release single, "Paint Me", in January. The first installment in the album series, the group's sixth EP Yellow Flower, was released with the single, "Starry Night", in March 2018. "Starry Night" became one of the group's most successful singles; in November, it received the Korean Music & Content Association's platinum certification for 100 million streams and in July 2019 was certified for 2.5 million paid downloads. The second album in the "Four Seasons, Four Colors" project, the EP Red Moon, was released in July with the single, "Egotistic". Red Moon became the group's first entry on the Billboard Heatseekers Albums chart, entering at number 25. The third album in the series, Blue;s, was released with the single, "Wind Flower", that November.

Mamamoo released their ninth EP and the final installment to the "Four Seasons, Four Colors" series, White Wind, and its lead single, "Gogobebe", in March 2019. That July, they released "Gleam" as a promotional single for Davich Sunglasses. On August 7, the group released 4Colors, their Japanese debut album. From August to October, they participated in Mnet reality-competition show Queendom, in which they finished in first place. As part of the show, they released the original song, "Destiny". In November, Mamamoo released their second Korean studio album, Reality in Black, and its lead single, "Hip". Reality in Black debuted at number one on the Gaon Album Chart, giving the group their third number-one on the chart. "Hip" peaked atop the Billboard World Digital Songs Sales chart, making it their first-ever number-one.

In January 2020, Mamamoo released "I Miss You" from the soundtrack for Dr. Romantic 2. Following solo activities from the members—such as Moonbyul's debut EP Dark Side of the Moon, Solar's debut single album Spit It Out, and Hwasa's debut EP María—throughout the first half of 2020, the group released a promotional single, "Wanna Be Myself", in collaboration with Andar on September 10. Mamamoo released "Dingga", the first single (and only pre-release song) from their upcoming tenth EP, on October 20. The group's tenth EP, Travel, was released on November 3, 2020, with a second single "Aya". The Japanese version of Travel was released on February 3, 2021. The group's eleventh EP, WAW, which stands for "Where Are We," was released on June 2, 2021, with the lead single "Where Are We Now".

In October 2022, Mamamoo released their twelfth EP, Mic On, with the lead single "Illella."

In October 2025, it was announced that Mamamoo would be making their first comeback and releasing their first full-group album in nearly four years in 2026. In April 2026, the group's comeback was confirmed for June 2026, to coincide with their twelfth anniversary. Mamamoo released a special single, 4ward, on June 4, 2026, with the title track "4 Flowers."

== Albums ==
=== Studio albums ===
List of studio albums, with selected details and chart positions
Title	Details	Peak chart positions				Sales
Title	Details	KOR	JPN	JPN Hot	US World	Sales
Melting	Released: February 26, 2016 (KOR); Label: RBW; Formats: CD, digital download	2	—	—	8	KOR: 53,600
4colors	Released: August 7, 2019 (JPN); Label: Victor Entertainment; Formats: CD, DVD, digital download	—	14	18	—	JPN: 7,966
Reality in Black	Released: November 14, 2019 (KOR); Label: RBW, Victor Entertainment; Formats: CD, digital download	1	27	53	11	KOR: 127,174; JPN: 2,586; US: 1,000

=== Compilation albums ===
Title	Details	Peak chart positions			Sales
Title	Details	KOR	JPN	JPN Hot	Sales
I Say Mamamoo: The Best	Released: September 15, 2021; Label: RBW; Formats: CD, digital download	8	43	97	KOR: 59,155; JPN: 853

=== Single albums ===
List of single albums, with selected chart positions and sales
Title	Details	Peak chart positions	Sales
Title	Details	KOR	Sales
4ward	Released: June 4, 2026; Label: RBW; Formats: CD, digital download	8	KOR: 73,000

== Extended plays ==
List of extended plays, with selected chart positions and sales
Title	Details	Peak chart positions						Sales
Title	Details	KOR	FRA DL	JPN	JPN Hot	US Heat	US World	Sales
Hello	Released: June 18, 2014; Label: WA Entertainment; Formats: CD, digital download	9	—	—	—	—	—	KOR: 12,900
Piano Man	Released: November 21, 2014; Label: WA Entertainment; Formats: CD, digital download	8	—	—	—	—	—	KOR: 6,900
Pink Funky	Released: June 19, 2015; Label: RBW; Formats: CD, digital download	6	—	—	—	—	7	KOR: 18,300
Memory	Released: November 7, 2016; Label: RBW; Formats: CD, digital download	3	—	—	—	—	12	KOR: 59,900; JPN: 795
Purple	Released: June 22, 2017; Label: RBW; Formats: CD, digital download	2	—	—	—	—	1	KOR: 60,608; US: 1,000; JPN: 341
Yellow Flower	Released: March 7, 2018; Label: RBW; Formats: CD, digital download	1	—	—	—	—	7	KOR: 68,052
Red Moon	Released: July 16, 2018; Label: RBW; Formats: CD, digital download	3	48	—	—	25	4	KOR: 77,710; US: 1,000
Blue;S	Released: November 29, 2018; Label: RBW; Formats: CD, digital download	7	173	—	—	—	—	KOR: 65,226
White Wind	Released: March 14, 2019; Label: RBW; Formats: CD, digital download	1	101	—	—	—	5	KOR: 81,113
Travel	Released: November 3, 2020; Label: RBW, Victor Entertainment; Formats: CD, digital download	2	—N/a	4	5	—	—	KOR: 180,166; CHN: 141,000; JPN: 14,554
WAW	Released: June 2, 2021; Label: RBW; Formats: CD, digital download	5	—N/a	17	13	—	—	KOR: 135,200; JPN: 5,252
Mic On	Released: October 11, 2022; Label: RBW; Formats: CD, digital download	7	—N/a	—	—	—	—	KOR: 138,302
"—" denotes releases that did not chart or were not released in that region.			—N/a					

== Singles ==
=== As lead artist ===
Title	Year	Peak chart positions									Sales (Note: Sales figures for tracks are based on digital downloads, except noted.)	Certifications (Note: In April 2018, Gaon Chart introduced music recording certifications for albums, downloads and streamings.)	Album
Title	Year	KOR	KOR Billb. (Note: Includes the Billboard K-pop Hot 100 (2011-2014, 2017-2022), and Billboard South Korea Songs (2022 onwards). The Billboard K-pop Hot 100 chart launched on August 25, 2011 and was discontinued on July 16, 2014. The chart was re-established on June 4, 2017, but was discontinued on April 30, 2022 and replaced by South Korea Songs from Billboard's Hits of the World series.)	HUN	JPN	JPN Hot	NZ Hot	SGP	TWN	US World	Sales	Certifications	Album
"Don't Be Happy" (행복하지마) (with Bumkey)	2014	20	24	—	—	—	—	—	—	—	KOR: 171,000	—N/a	Hello
"Peppermint Chocolate" (썸남썸녀) (with K.Will featuring Wheesung)	2014	10	7	—	—	—	—	—	—	—	KOR: 607,000	—N/a	Hello
"Heeheehaheho" (히히하헤호) (with Geeks)	2014	50	—	—	—	—	—	—	—	—	KOR: 81,000	—N/a	Hello
"Mr. Ambiguous" (Mr. 애매모호)	2014	19	28	—	—	—	—	—	—	—	KOR: 446,000	—N/a	Hello
"Piano Man"	2014	41	*	—	—	—	—	—	—	—	KOR: 309,000	—N/a	Piano Man
"Ahh Oop!" (아훕!) (with eSNa)	2015	67	*	—	—	—	—	—	—	—	KOR: 67,000	—N/a	Pink Funky
"Um Oh Ah Yeh" (음오아예)	2015	3	*	—	—	—	—	—	—	—	KOR: 1,188,000	—N/a	Pink Funky
"I Miss You"	2016	7	*	—	—	—	—	—	—	16	KOR: 812,000	—N/a	Melting
"Taller Than You" (1cm의 자존심)	2016	5	*	—	—	—	—	—	—	8	KOR: 485,000	—N/a	Melting
"You're the Best" (넌 is 뭔들)	2016	1	*	—	—	—	—	—	—	3	KOR: 1,428,000	—N/a	Melting
"New York"	2016	9	*	—	—	—	—	—	—	—	KOR: 252,000	—N/a	Memory
"Décalcomanie" (데칼코마니) (Note: "Décalcomanie (Japanese Version)" was released on October 3, 2018 as the group's debut Japanese single.)	2016	2	53	—	11	38	—	—	—	12	KOR: 2,500,000; JPN: 9,444 (Phy.)	—N/a	Memory
"Yes I Am" (나로 말할 것 같으면)	2017	2	1	—	—	—	—	—	—	7	KOR: 1,110,000; US: 1,000	—N/a	Purple
"Paint Me" (칠해줘)	2018	36	43	—	—	—	—	—	—	22	—N/a	—N/a	Yellow Flower
"Starry Night" (별이 빛나는 밤)	2018	2	1	—	—	—	—	—	—	8	KOR: 2,500,000	KMCA: Platinum (str.); KMCA: Platinum (dig.)	Yellow Flower
"Rainy Season" (장마)	2018	2	3	—	—	—	—	—	—	—	—N/a	—N/a	Red Moon
"Egotistic" (너나 해)	2018	4	4	—	—	—	—	27	—	4	—N/a	—N/a	Red Moon
"Wind Flower" (Note: "Wind Flower (Japanese Version)" was released on February 6, 2019.)	2018	9	10	—	16	62	—	—	—	16	JPN: 7,097 (Phy.)	—N/a	Blue;s
"Gogobebe" (고고베베)	2019	5	2	—	—	—	34	25	—	2	US: 1,000	—N/a	White Wind
"Hip" (Note: "Hip (Japanese Version)" was released as a digital single on February 5, 2020 and included on the Japanese edition of Reality In Black on March 11, 2020.)	2019	4	2	—	—	39	35	14	—	1	US: 2,000	KMCA: Platinum (str.); RIAJ: Gold	Reality in Black
"Dingga" (딩가딩가) (Note: "Dingga (Japanese Version)" was released as a digital single on January 20, 2021 and included on the Japanese edition of Travel on February 3, 2021.)	2020	7	5	—	—	58	—	21	—	8	—N/a	—N/a	Travel
"Aya" (Note: "Aya (Japanese Version)" was released as a digital single on January 27, 2021 and included on the Japanese edition of Travel on February 3, 2021.)	2020	37	21	—	—	—	—	27	—	17	—N/a	—N/a	Travel
"Where Are We Now" (Note: "Where Are We Now (Japanese Version)" was released as a digital single on September 23, 2021 and included on the Japanese edition of WAW on September 29, 2021.)	2021	93	46	—	—	—	—	— (Note: "Where Are We Now" did not enter the RIAS Top Streaming Chart, but it peaked at number 23 on the RIAS Top Regional Streaming Chart.)	—	24	—N/a	—N/a	WAW
"Mumumumuch" (하늘 땅 바다만큼)	2021	102	—	—	—	—	—	—	—	—	—N/a	—N/a	I Say Mamamoo: The Best
"Illella" (일낼라)	2022	66	—	27	—	—	—	30	—	5	—N/a	—N/a	Mic On
"4 Flowers"	2026	— (Note: "4 Flowers" did not enter the Circle Digital Chart, but it peaked at number nine on the component Circle Download Chart.)	—	—	—	—	—	—	4	—	—N/a	—N/a	4ward
"—" denotes releases that did not chart or were not released in that region. "*" denotes the chart did not exist at that time.

=== As featured artist ===
Title	Year	Peak chart positions	Sales (DL)	Album
Title	Year	KOR	Sales (DL)	Album
"Stand Up" (Basick featuring Mamamoo)	2015	21	KOR: 255,000	Show Me the Money 4
"To Bride" (Yurisangja featuring Mamamoo)	2017	—	—N/a	Twenty
"Let's Dance" (신난다) (B.Ryong of SSAK3 featuring Mamamoo)	2020	6	—N/a	두리쥬와 X Linda X 신난다

=== Promotional singles ===
Title	Year	Peak chart positions			Sales (DL)	Album
Title	Year	KOR	KOR Hot	US World	Sales (DL)	Album
"Love Lane"	2014	26	*	—	KOR: 258,000	Marriage, Not Dating OST and Piano Man
"This Song" (이 노래) (with Loco)	2014	65	*	—	KOR: 73,000	My Lovely Girl OST
"My Everything" (내 눈 속엔 너)	2015	93	*	—	KOR: 27,000	SPY OST
"Girl Crush" (Note: "Girl Crush" was released in collaboration with Innisia Nest.)	2015	13	*	—	KOR: 320,000	Innisia Nest and Melting
"Woo Hoo" (기대해도 좋은 날) (Note: "Woo Hoo" was released as a promotional single in collaboration with brand "LG G5".)	2016	15	*	—	KOR: 191,000	LG G5 and Friends and Memory
"Sexy Man" (섹시한 남자)	2016	— (Note: "Sexy Man" did not enter the Gaon Digital Chart, but it peaked at number 76 on the Gaon Download Chart.)	*	—	KOR: 22,000	Two Yoo Project Sugar Man Pt. 30
"Love"	2017	6	*	—	KOR: 444,000	Goblin OST
"Double Trouble Couple"	2017	46	*	—	KOR: 60,000	Strong Girl Bong-soon OST
"Open Your Mind" (마음아 열려라)	2017	— (Note: "Open Your Mind" did not enter the Gaon Digital Chart, but it peaked at number 100 on the component Gaon Download Chart.)	*	—	KOR: 18,000	Man to Man OST
"Taste the Feeling" (Note: "Taste the Feeling" was released as a promotional single in collaboration with Coca-Cola.)	2017	—	—	—	—N/a	Non-album single
"Gloomy Coincidence" (우울한 우연) (Note: Originally performed by Kola.)	2018	— (Note: "Gloomy Coincidence" did not enter the Gaon Digital Chart, but it peaked at number 78 on the component Download Chart.)	—	—	—N/a	Two Yoo Project Sugar Man 2 Pt. 7
"You in My Dreams"	2018	—	—	—	—N/a	Suits OST
"Everyday" (매일 봐요) (Note: "Everyday" was released as a promotional single in collaboration with brand "BIO".)	2018	85	—	—	—N/a	Non-album single
"Wow"	2019	111	99	—	—N/a	Search: WWW OST
"Gleam" (다 빛이나) (Note: "Gleam" was released as a promotional single in collaboration with brand "Davich".)	2019	89	83	15	—N/a	Non-album single
"I Miss You" (자꾸 더 보고싶은 사람)	2020	101	89	—	—N/a	Dr. Romantic 2 OST
"Shampoo" (Note: "Shampoo" is included only on the Japanese edition of Reality In Black (2020).)	2020	—	—	—	—N/a	Reality In Black
"Wanna Be Myself" (나는 안다르다) (Note: "Wanna Be Myself" was released as a promotional single in collaboration with brand "ANDAR".)	2020	93	51	11	—N/a	Travel
"Don't Worry, Dear" (Note: "Don't Worry, Dear" is a remake of the original song from the Reply 1998 original soundtrack.) (with Yoo Hee-yeol, Yoon Jong-shin, Jannabi, Lee Juck, 10cm, and Jung Seung-hwan)	2020	—	—	—	—N/a	You Hee Yeol's Sketchbook: 50th Voice, Vol. 79
"MMM Simile (Live Ver.)"	2023	— (Note: "MMM Simile (Live Ver.)" did not enter the Circle Digital Chart, but it peaked at number 71 on the component Circle Download Chart.)	—	—	—N/a	Hwa Sa Show, Vol. 3
"—" denotes releases that did not chart or were not released in that region. "*" denotes that the chart did not exist at that time.

== Other charted songs ==
Title	Year	Peak chart positions			Sales (DL)	Album
Title	Year	KOR	KOR Hot	US World	Sales (DL)	Album
"Words Don't Come Easy" (우리끼리)	2016	84	*	—	KOR: 52,200	Melting
"Friday Night" (금요일밤) (featuring Junggigo)	2016	52	*	—	KOR: 80,000	Melting
"My Hometown" (고향이)	2016	115	*	—	KOR: 24,000	Melting
"Emotion"	2016	91	*	—	KOR: 44,000	Melting
"Funky Boy"	2016	116	*	—	KOR: 24,000	Melting
"Recipe" (나만의)	2016	123	*	—	KOR: 22,000	Melting
"Cat Fight" (고양이)	2016	128	*	—	KOR: 22,700	Melting
"Just"	2016	124	*	—	KOR: 23,000	Melting
"Memory" (그리고 그리고 그려봐)	2016	85	*	—	KOR: 27,000	Memory
"Moderato" (featuring Hash Swan) (Note: Though credited to Mamamoo, "Moderato" is a solo by Wheein, with featured vocals from Hash Swan.)	2016	— (Note: "Moderato" did not enter the Gaon Digital Chart, but it peaked at number 42 on the component Download Chart.)	*	—	KOR: 25,000	Memory
"I Love Too" (놓지 않을게)	2016	91	*	—	KOR: 26,000	Memory
"Finally"	2017	42	41	—	KOR: 72,000	Purple
"Love and Hate" (구차해) (Note: Though credited to Mamamoo, "Love & Hate" is a solo by Moonbyul.)	2017	51	88	—	KOR: 61,000	Purple
"Da Ra Da" (다라다) (Note: Though credited to Mamamoo, "Da Ra Da" is a solo by Wheein, with featured vocals by Jeff Bernat and B.O.)	2017	80	—	—	KOR: 74,000	Purple
"Aze Gag" (아재개그)	2017	23	20	—	KOR: 225,000	Purple
"Star Wind Flower Sun" (별 바람 꽃 태양)	2018	51	28	—	—N/a	Yellow Flower
"Be Calm" (덤덤해지네) (Note: Though credited to Mamamoo, "Be Calm" is a solo by Hwasa.)	2018	— (Note: "Be Calm" did not enter the Gaon Digital Chart, but it peaked at number 35 on the component Download Chart.)	—	—	—N/a	Yellow Flower
"Rude Boy"	2018	— (Note: "Rude Boy" did not enter the Gaon Digital Chart, but it peaked at number 27 on the component Download Chart.)	—	—	—N/a	Yellow Flower
"Spring Fever" (봄타)	2018	— (Note: "Spring Fever" did not enter the Gaon Digital Chart, but it peaked at number 30 on the component Download Chart.)	—	—	—N/a	Yellow Flower
"Midnight Summer Dream" (여름밤의 꿈)	2018	92	—	—	—N/a	Red Moon
"Sky! Sky!" (하늘하늘 (청순))	2018	— (Note: "Sky! Sky!" did not enter the Gaon Digital Chart, but it peaked at number 35 on the component Download Chart.)	—	—	—N/a	Red Moon
"Sleep in the Car" (잠이라도 자지)	2018	— (Note: "Sleep in the Car" did not enter the Gaon Digital Chart, but it peaked at number 32 on the component Download Chart.)	—	—	—N/a	Red Moon
"No More Drama"	2018	— (Note: "No More Drama" did not enter the Gaon Digital Chart, but it peaked at number 51 on the component Download Chart.)	—	—	—N/a	Blue;S
"Hello" (Note: Though credited to Mamamoo, "Hello" is a solo by Solar.)	2018	— (Note: "Hello" did not enter the Gaon Digital Chart, but it peaked at number 98 on the component Download Chart.)	—	—	—N/a	Blue;S
"Better Than I Thought" (생각보단 괜찮아)	2018	— (Note: "Better Than I Thought" did not enter the Gaon Digital Chart, but it peaked at number 64 on the component Download Chart.)	—	—	—N/a	Blue;S
"Morning"	2018	— (Note: "Morning" did not enter the Gaon Digital Chart, but it peaked at number 92 on the component Download Chart.)	—	—	—N/a	Blue;S
"Where R U"	2019	143	—	—	—N/a	White Wind
"Waggy" (쟤가 걔야)	2019	131	—	—	—N/a	White Wind
"25" (Note: Though credited to Mamamoo, "25" is a solo song by Wheein.)	2019	183	—	—	—N/a	White Wind
"Bad Bye"	2019	190	—	—	—N/a	White Wind
"My Star"	2019	— (Note: "My Star" did not enter the Gaon Digital Chart, but it peaked at number 39 on the component Download Chart.)	—	—	—N/a	White Wind
"4season (Outro)"	2019	— (Note: "4season (Outro)" did not enter the Gaon Digital Chart, but it peaked at number 59 on the component Download Chart.)	—	—	—N/a	White Wind
"Good Luck" (Note: "Good Luck" is a cover of the 2016 AOA song of the same name.)	2019	— (Note: "Good Luck" did not enter the Gaon Digital Chart, but it peaked at number 162 on the component Download Chart.)	—	12	—N/a	Queendom Cover Song Performances Part 1
"Destiny" (우린 결국 다시 만날 운명이었지)	2019	68	36	7	—N/a	Queendom Final Comeback and Reality in Black
"Universe"	2019	— (Note: "Universe" did not enter the Gaon Digital Chart, but it peaked at number 66 on the component Download Chart.)	—	—	—N/a	Reality in Black
"Ten Nights" (열 밤)	2019	194	—	—	—N/a	Reality in Black
"4x4ever"	2019	— (Note: "4x4ever" did not enter the Gaon Digital Chart, but it peaked at number 64 on the component Download Chart.)	—	—	—N/a	Reality in Black
"Better"	2019	— (Note: "Better" did not enter the Gaon Digital Chart, but it peaked at number 69 on the component Download Chart.)	—	—	—N/a	Reality in Black
"Hello Mama"	2019	— (Note: "Hello Mama" did not enter the Gaon Digital Chart, but it peaked at number 83 on the component Download Chart.)	—	—	—N/a	Reality in Black
"ZzZz" (심심해)	2019	— (Note: "ZzZz" did not enter the Gaon Digital Chart, but it peaked at number 80 on the component Download Chart.)	—	—	—N/a	Reality in Black
"Reality"	2019	— (Note: "Reality" did not enter the Gaon Digital Chart, but it peaked at number 85 on the component Download Chart.)	—	—	—N/a	Reality in Black
"High Tension" (춤을 춰)	2019	— (Note: "High Tension" did not enter the Gaon Digital Chart, but it peaked at number 76 on the component Download Chart.)	—	—	—N/a	Reality in Black
"I'm Your Fan"	2019	— (Note: "I'm Your Fan" did not enter the Gaon Digital Chart, but it peaked at number 81 on the component Download Chart.)	—	—	—N/a	Reality in Black
"Travel"	2020	— (Note: "Travel" did not enter the Gaon Digital Chart, but it debuted at number 42 on the component Download Chart.)	—	—	—N/a	Travel
"Chuck" (척)	2020	— (Note: "Chuck" did not enter the Gaon Digital Chart, but it debuted at number 52 on the component Download Chart.)	—	—	—N/a	Travel
"Diamond"	2020	— (Note: "Diamond" did not enter the Gaon Digital Chart, but it debuted at number 75 on the component Download Chart.)	—	—	—N/a	Travel
"Good Night" (잘자)	2020	— (Note: "Good Night" did not enter the Gaon Digital Chart, but it debuted at number 62 on the component Download Chart.)	—	—	—N/a	Travel
"Another Day" (내일의 너, 오늘의 나)	2021	— (Note: "Another Day" did not enter the Gaon Digital Chart, but it debuted at number 41 on the component Download Chart.)	—	—	—N/a	WAW
"A Memory for Life" (애써)	2021	— (Note: "A Memory for Life" did not enter the Gaon Digital Chart, but it debuted at number 48 on the component Download Chart.)	—	—	—N/a	WAW
"Destiny Part.2" (우린 결국 다시 만날 운명이었지 Part.2)	2021	— (Note: "Destiny Part.2" did not enter the Gaon Digital Chart, but it debuted at number 47 on the component Download Chart.)	—	—	—N/a	WAW
"Happier Than Ever" (분명 우린 그때 좋았었어)	2021	— (Note: "Happier than Ever" did not enter the Gaon Digital Chart, but it debuted at number 75 on the component Download Chart.)	—	—	—N/a	I Say Mamamoo: The Best
"Paint Me" (Orchestra Version) (칠해줘 (Orchestra Version)	2021	— (Note: "Paint Me" (Orchestra ver.) did not enter the Gaon Digital Chart, but it debuted at number 112 on the component Download Chart.)	—	—	—N/a	I Say Mamamoo: The Best
"Starry Night" (Orchestra Version) (별이 빛나는 밤 (Orchestra Version)	2021	— (Note: "Starry Night" (Orchestra ver.) did not enter the Gaon Digital Chart, but it debuted at number 106 on the component Download Chart.)	—	—	—N/a	I Say Mamamoo: The Best
"Gogobebe" (Rock Version) (고고베베 (Rock Version))	2021	— (Note: "Gogobebe" (Rock ver.) did not enter the Gaon Digital Chart, but it debuted at number 109 on the component Download Chart.)	—	—	—N/a	I Say Mamamoo: The Best
"Egotistic" (Blistering Sun Version) (너나 해 (Blistering Sun Version)	2021	— (Note: "Egotistic" (Blistering sun ver.) did not enter the Gaon Digital Chart, but it debuted at number 121 on the component Download Chart.)	—	—	—N/a	I Say Mamamoo: The Best
"You're the Best 2021" (넌 is 뭔들 2021)	2021	— (Note: "You’re the Best 2021" did not enter the Gaon Digital Chart, but it debuted at number 114 on the component Download Chart.)	—	—	—N/a	I Say Mamamoo: The Best
"I Miss You 2021"	2021	— (Note: "I Miss You 2021" did not enter the Gaon Digital Chart, but it debuted at number 125 on the component Download Chart.)	—	—	—N/a	I Say Mamamoo: The Best
"HeeHeeHaHeHo Part.2" (히히하헤호 Part.2)	2021	— (Note: "HeeHeeHaHeHo Part.2" did not enter the Gaon Digital Chart, but it debuted at number 130 on the component Download Chart.)	—	—	—N/a	I Say Mamamoo: The Best
"Words Don't Come Easy 2021" (우리끼리 2021)	2021	— (Note: "Words Don't Come Easy 2021" did not enter the Gaon Digital Chart, but it debuted at number 137 on the component Download Chart.)	—	—	—N/a	I Say Mamamoo: The Best
"Piano Man 2021"	2021	— (Note: "Piano Man 2021" did not enter the Gaon Digital Chart, but it debuted at number 120 on the component Download Chart.)	—	—	—N/a	I Say Mamamoo: The Best
"Ahh Oop 2021"	2021	— (Note: "Ahh Oop 2021" did not enter the Gaon Digital Chart, but it debuted at number 135 on the component Download Chart.)	—	—	—N/a	I Say Mamamoo: The Best
"Decalcomanie 2021" (데칼코마니 2021)	2021	— (Note: "Decalcomanie 2021" did not enter the Gaon Digital Chart, but it debuted at number 119 on the component Download Chart.)	—	—	—N/a	I Say Mamamoo: The Best
"Aya" (Traditional Version)	2021	— (Note: "AYA (Traditional ver.)" did not enter the Gaon Digital Chart, but it debuted at number 139 on the component Download Chart.)	—	—	—N/a	I Say Mamamoo: The Best
"Hip" (Remix Version)	2021	— (Note: "Hip" (Remix ver.) did not enter the Gaon Digital Chart, but it debuted at number 118 on the component Download Chart.)	—	—	—N/a	I Say Mamamoo: The Best
"A Little Bit 2021" (따끔 2021)	2021	— (Note: "A little bit 2021" did not enter the Gaon Digital Chart, but it debuted at number 140 on the component Download Chart.)	—	—	—N/a	I Say Mamamoo: The Best
"Wind Flower" (Dramatic Version)	2021	— (Note: "Wind flower" (Dramatic ver.) did not enter the Gaon Digital Chart, but it debuted at number 133 on the component Download Chart.)	—	—	—N/a	I Say Mamamoo: The Best
"Um Oh Ah Yeh 2021" (음오아예 2021)	2021	— (Note: "Um Oh Ah Yeh 2021" did not enter the Gaon Digital Chart, but it debuted at number 129 on the component Download Chart.)	—	—	—N/a	I Say Mamamoo: The Best
"Don't Be Happy 2021" (행복하지마 2021)	2021	— (Note: "Don't Be Happy 2021" did not enter the Gaon Digital Chart, but it debuted at number 131 on the component Download Chart.)	—	—	—N/a	I Say Mamamoo: The Best
"Peppermint Chocolate (MMM Version)" (썸남썸녀 (MMM Version))	2021	— (Note: "Peppermint Chocolate (MMM ver.)" did not enter the Gaon Digital Chart, but it debuted at number 134 on the component Download Chart.)	—	—	—N/a	I Say Mamamoo: The Best
"Destiny (Extended Version)" (우린 결국 다시 만날 운명이었지 (Extended Version)	2021	— (Note: "Destiny (Extended ver.)" did not enter the Gaon Digital Chart, but it debuted at number 141 on the component Download Chart.)	—	—	—N/a	I Say Mamamoo: The Best
"Mr. Ambiguous 2021" (Mr.애매모호 2021)	2021	— (Note: "Mr. Ambiguous 2021" did not enter the Gaon Digital Chart, but it debuted at number 142 on the component Download Chart.)	—	—	—N/a	I Say Mamamoo: The Best
"Yes I Am (Funk Boost Version)" (나로 말할 것 같으면 (Funk Boost Version))	2021	— (Note: "Yes I am (Funk boost ver.)" did not enter the Gaon Digital Chart, but it debuted at number 138 on the component Download Chart.)	—	—	—N/a	I Say Mamamoo: The Best
"1,2,3 Eoi!" (하나둘셋 어이!)	2022	— (Note: "1,2,3 Eoi!" did not enter the Circle Digital Chart, but it debuted at number 27 on the component Download Chart.)	*	8	—N/a	Mic On
"L.I.E.C."	2022	— (Note: "L.I.E.C." did not enter the Circle Digital Chart, but it debuted at number 25 on the component Download Chart.)	*	10	—N/a	Mic On
"—" denotes releases that did not chart or were not released in that region. "*" denotes that the chart did not exist at that time.

== Music videos ==
Title	Year	Director	Ref.
"Don't Be Happy" (with Bumkey)	2014	Min Oh	
"Peppermint Chocolate" (with K.Will and Wheesung)	2014	Min Oh	
"Mr. Ambiguous"	2014	Min Oh	
"Piano Man"	2014	METAOLOZ	
"Ahh Oop!" (with Esna)	2015	Digipedi	
"Um Oh Ah Yeh"	2015	Purple Straw Film	
"Stand Up" (with Basick)	2015	Unknown	—N/a
"Girl Crush"	2015	Unknown	—N/a
"Taller Than You"	2016	Vegetarian Pitbull	
"You're the Best"	2016	Purple Straw Film	
"Recipe"	2016	Unknown	—N/a
"My Hometown"	2016	Unknown	—N/a
"Woo Hoo"	2016	Purple Straw Film	
"New York"	2016	Hong Won Ki (Zanybros)	
"I Love Too"	2016	Hong Won Ki (Zanybros)	
"Décalcomanie"	2016	Hong Won Ki (Zanybros)	
"Memory"	2016	Unknown	—N/a
"Aze Gag"	2017	Hong Won Ki (Zanybros)	
"Yes I Am"	2017	Hong Won Ki (Zanybros)	
"Paint me"	2018	Hong Won Ki (Zanybros)	
"Star Wind Flower Sun"	2018	Hong Won Ki (Zanybros)	
"Starry Night"	2018	Hong Won Ki (Zanybros)	
"Everyday"	2018	Hor Jaewon, Kim Jiyoung (RBW)	
"Sky Sky"	2018	Hor Jaewon, Kim Jiyoung (RBW)	
"Egotistic"	2018	Hong Won Ki (Zanybros)	
"Wind Flower"	2018	Hong Won Ki, Lee Haejin (Zanybros)	
"gogobebe"	2019	Hong Won Ki, Park Seong Won (Zanybros)	
"Gleam"	2019	Kim Sung Joo (핀츨리로드, 꾸욱꾸욱)	
"HIP"	2019	Hong Won Ki, Bae Myeong Hyun (Zanybros)	
"Wanna Be Myself"	2020	Hong Won-ki, Lee Haejin (Zanybros)	
"Dingga"	2020	Hong Won-ki, Park Sangwon (Zanybros)	
"AYA"	2020	Hong Won-ki, Bae Myounghyun, Park Sangwon (Zanybros)	
"Where Are We Now"	2021	Hobin (a HOBIN film)	
"mumumumuch"	2021	Yoo Sungkyun (Sunny Visual)	
"Illella"	2022	Bae Myounghyun (Zanybros)	
"하나둘셋 어이!(1, 2, 3 Eoi!)"	2022	Bae Myounghyun (Zanybros)	
"4 Flowers"	2026	Nany Kim	

== See also ==
- Solar's discography
- Moonbyul's discography
- Wheein's discography
- Hwasa's discography
