= 2019 M2 X Genie Music Awards =

South Korean music awards ceremony

- Date: August 1, 2019
- Location: Olympic Gymnastics Arena, Seoul, South Korea
- Hosted by: Han Hye-jin
- Most awards: BTS (6)

Television/radio coverage
- Network: Mnet

The 2019 M2 X Genie Music Awards was held at the Olympic Gymnastics Arena (KSPO Dome) in Seoul, South Korea on August 1, 2019. The event was the second edition of the awards ceremony and was hosted by model Han Hye-jin. The 2019 edition is named the "M2 X Genie Music Awards" (MGMA) as with their partnership with Mnet's digital studio, M2. The eligibility period for nominations was between July 1, 2018, and June 19, 2019.

== Performances ==
- Chungha – "Gotta Go" + "Snapping"
- Verivery – "Boy With Luv" (BTS), "Oh My!" (Seventeen) mashup + "Tempo" (Exo)
- Nature – "Solo" (Jennie)
- Bvndit – "Twit" (Hwasa)
- Nature & Bvndit – "Shoot Out" (Monsta X)
- Nature & Verivery & Bvndit – "Yes or Yes" (Twice)
- TXT – "Crown"
- Day6 – "Bookmarks" (medley) + "Time of Our Life"
- AB6IX – "Absolute" + "Breathe"
- Paul Kim – "Every Day, Every Moment" + "Me After You" Part 1 & 2
- Itzy – "Icy" + "Dalla Dalla"
- WJSN – "I Swear" + "Touch My Body" (Sistar)
- Pentagon – "Naughty Boy" + "Humph!"
- WJSN – "Boogie Up!"
- Kim Jae-hwan – "My Star" + "Begin Again"
- Iz*One – "Violeta" + "Highlight"
- Mamamoo – "Wind Flower" + "Gogobebe"
- EXID's Solji and B1A4's Sandeul – "Instinctively" + "Uphill Road" (Yoon Jong-shin)
- Twice – "Breakthrough" + "Fancy" + "Dance the Night Away"

== Judging criteria ==
Division	Online Voting	Digital Sales	Judge Score	Social Media	Twitter Voting
The Top Artist	20%	20%	20%	30%	10%
The Top Music	—	100%	—	—	—
The Top Best Selling Artist	—	100%	—	—	—
M2 Top Video	—	—	—	100%	—
Music Awards*	30%	30%	30%	10%	—
Special Awards**	100%	—	—	—	—
*The Male Group, The Female Group, The Male Solo Artist, The Female Solo Artist, The Male New Artist, The Female New Artist, The Performing Artist Male, The Performing Artist Female, The Vocal Artist, The Band; **Genie Music Popularity Award, Global Popularity Award

== Winners and nominees ==
Winners are highlighted in bold. Voting took place on the Genie Music website between June 20 to July 4, 2019.

=== Main awards ===
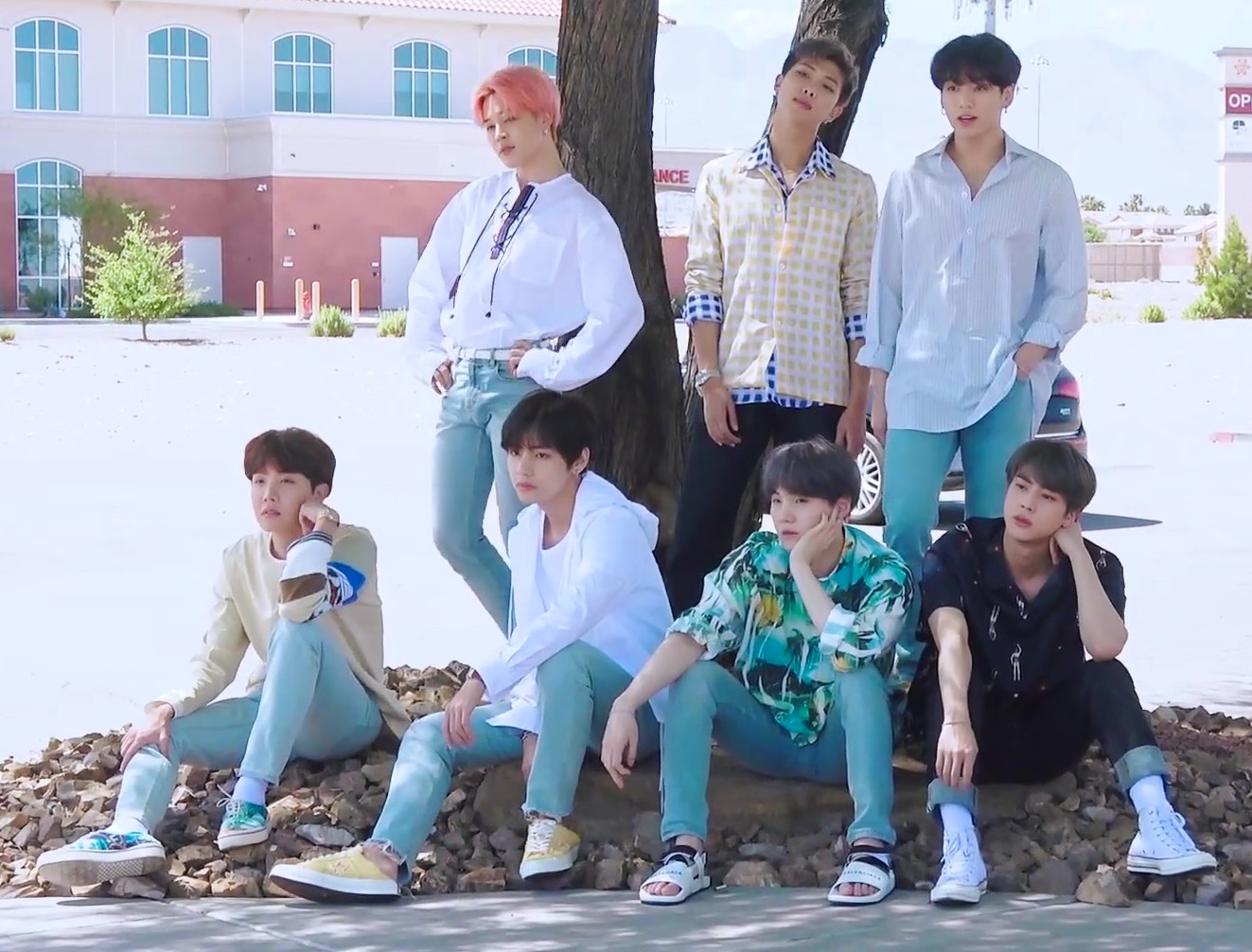
BTS won 6 awards, including The Top Artist & M2 Top Video

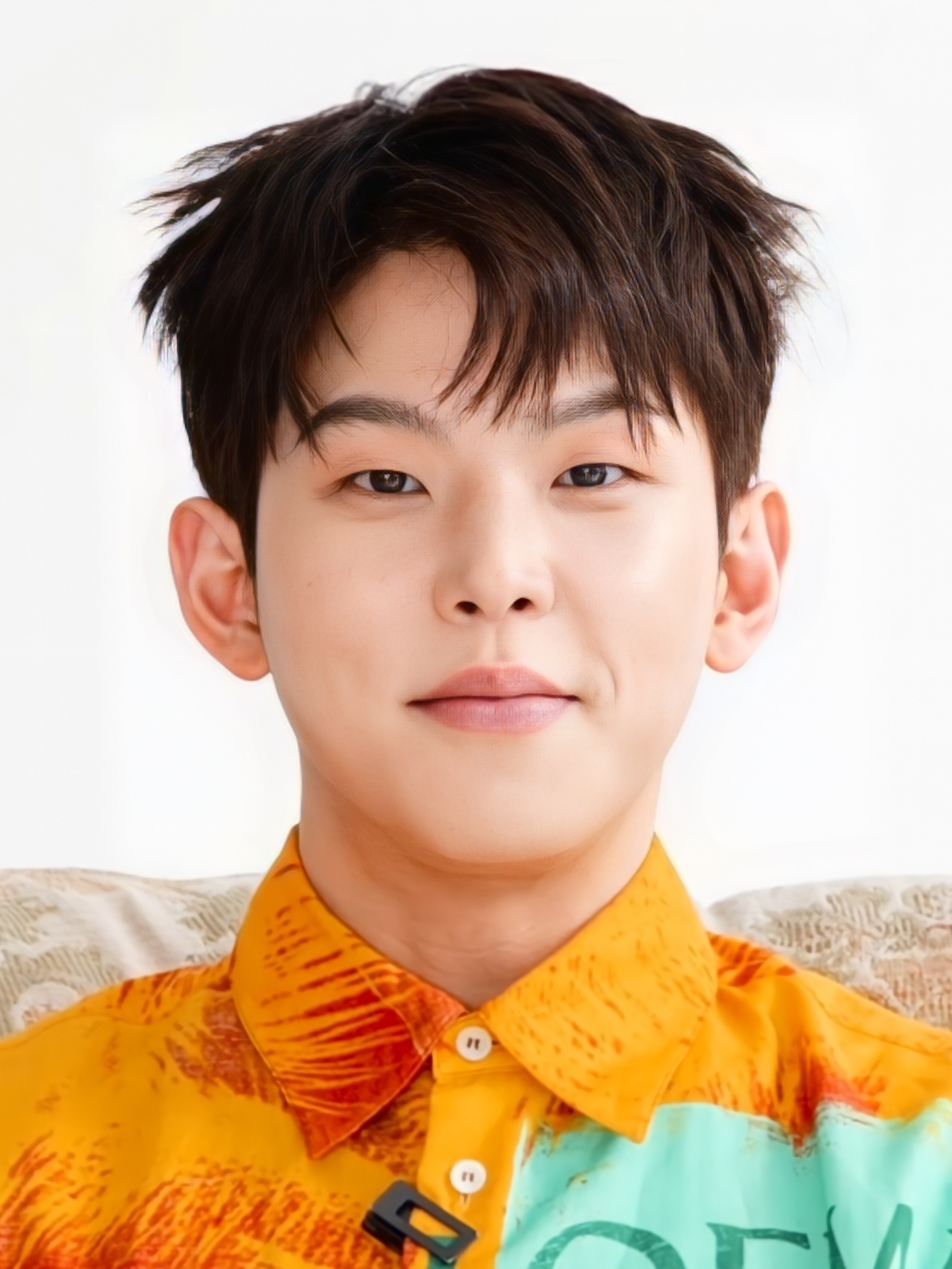
Paul Kim, The Top Music award and Best Male Solo Artist winner

The Top Artist (Daesang)	The Top Music (Daesang)
**BTS**	**Paul Kim – "Me After You"**
The Best Selling Artist (Daesang)	M2 Top Video (Daesang)
**Twice**	**BTS**
Best Male Group	Best Female Group
**BTS**; BtoB; Exo; Got7; iKon; MeloMance; NU'EST; Seventeen; Vibe; Winner	**Twice**; Apink; Blackpink; Bolbbalgan4; Davichi; GFriend; (G)I-dle; Iz*One; Mamamoo; Red Velvet
Best New Male Artist	Best New Female Artist
**TXT**; AB6IX; Ateez; Haeun; Ha Sung-woon; Kim Jae-hwan; Oneus; Park Ji-hoon; Verivery; Yoon Ji-sung	**Itzy**; Bvndit; Cherry Bullet; DreamNote; Everglow; GWSN; Jeon Somi; Loona; Mia; Nature
Best Male Solo Artist	Best Female Solo Artist
**Paul Kim**; Chen; Im Chang-jung; Jang Beom-june; Loco; Song Mino; Woody; Yang Da-il; Yoon Gun; 10cm	**Chungha**; Baek Ye-rin; Ben; Heize; Hwasa; IU; Jennie; Kassy; Sunmi; Taeyeon
Best Performing Artist – Male	Best Performing Artist – Female
**BTS**; Astro; Exo; Got7; Monsta X; NCT 127; NU'EST; Seventeen; Super Junior-D&E; Taemin	**Iz*One**; Blackpink; Chungha; GFriend; (G)I-dle; Oh My Girl; Red Velvet; Sunmi; Twice; WJSN
Best Vocal Artist	Best Band Performance
**Mamamoo – "Gogobebe"**; Ben; Bolbbalgan4; Chen; Davichi; Im Chang-jung; Jang Beom-june; Kassy; Paul Kim; Vibe	**Day6 – "Time of Our Life"**; Buzz; F.T. Island; Jannabi; Kiha & The Faces; MC the Max; NeighBro.; Nell; N.Flying; The Black Skirts

=== Other awards ===
- Global Popularity Award – BTS
- The Performance Creator – Lia Kim
- M2 Hot Star Award – Pentagon, WJSN
- Genie Music Next Generation Star – Kim Jae-hwan, AB6IX
- The Genie Music Popularity Award – BTS
- The Innovator – Yoon Jong-shin
