= Gogobebe =

Single by Mamamoo

from the album White Wind
- Released: March 14, 2019
- Genre: K-pop
- Length: 3:16
- Label: RBW
- Songwriters: Kim Do-hoon; Moonbyul; Solar
- Producers: Kim Do-hoon; Kim Gun-mo

Mamamoo singles chronology
"Wind Flower" (2018)	"Gogobebe" (2019)	"Hip" (2019)

"Gogobebe" (고고베베), stylized in all lowercase, is a song by South Korean girl group Mamamoo. It was released on March 14, 2019, by RBW as the lead single from the group's ninth extended play White Wind (2019). The song draws inspiration from Latin and reggae music and was written by Kim Do-hoon, Moonbyul, and Solar, with production performed by the former alongside famed South Korean singer Kim Gun-mo.

== Release and composition ==
"Gogobebe" was released on March 14, 2019, as the lead single from White Wind, Mamamoo's ninth EP and the fourth in their "Four Seasons, Four Colors" series of releases. The song is an energetic, reggaeton-influenced pop track that draws inspiration from Kim Gun-mo's song "Zzanga" (2001). During a press conference in which they performed the song, Wheein stated that "'Gogobebe' has the highest level of all the group dances [they] have done so far", referring to the increased difficulty of the song's choreography. The members also revealed that they and their fans wanted the group to perform something more lively after the release of the melancholic Blue;S EP (2018). Billboard stated that the song is "straight-forward electronic pop" and "sees the ladies encouraging listeners to leave the daily stresses of smartphones and stuffy work clothes to shamelessly have fun and drink away their pain".

== Commercial performance ==
"Gogobebe" debuted at number 11 on the Gaon Digital Chart, earning 23.7 million digital index points for the week ending March 16, 2019. In its second tracking week, "Gogobebe" ascended to its peak at number five on the chart. On the Billboard Korea K-pop Hot 100, the song peaked at number two.

In the United States, "Gogobebe" became the group's highest-charting single on the Billboard World Digital Song Sales, debuting at number 12 and peaking at number two, with 1,000 digital sales and 1.5 million streams in its first full tracking week. It charted for five weeks on the chart, becoming the group's longest-charting hit alongside "Egotistic" (2018). "Gogobebe" also became the group's first song to chart in New Zealand, peaking at number 34 on the RMNZ Hot Singles chart.

== Accolades ==
Awards and nominations
Organization	Year	Category	Nominee	Result	Ref.
Genie Music Awards	2019	The Vocal Artist	"Gogobebe"	Won	
Golden Disc Awards	2019	Digital Song Bonsang	"Gogobebe"	Nominated	
Melon Music Awards	2019	Best Female Dance	"Gogobebe"	Nominated	
Mnet Asian Music Awards	2019	Best Vocal Performance – Group	"Gogobebe"	Nominated	

Music program awards
Song	Program	Date
"Gogobebe"	The Show	March 19, 2019
"Gogobebe"	M Countdown	March 21, 2019
"Gogobebe"	M Countdown	March 28, 2019
"Gogobebe"	Show Champion	March 27, 2019
"Gogobebe"	Music Bank	March 29, 2019
"Gogobebe"	Show! Music Core	March 30, 2019
"Gogobebe"	Inkigayo	March 31, 2019

== Personnel ==
Credits adapted from Apple Music.

- Mamamoo - vocals
  - Moonbyul - songwriting
  - Solar - songwriting
- Kim Do-hoon - songwriting, production, engineering
- Kim Gun-mo - songwriting, composition

== Charts ==
=== Weekly charts ===
Weekly chart performance for "Gogobebe"
Chart (2019)	Peak position
New Zealand Hot Singles (Recorded Music NZ)	34
Singapore (RIAS)	25
South Korea (Gaon)	5
South Korea (Kpop Hot 100)	2
US World Digital Song Sales (Billboard)	2

Weekly chart performance for "Gogobebe (Rock Version)"
Chart (2021)	Peak position
South Korea Download (Gaon)	109

=== Year-end charts ===
2019 year-end chart performance for "Gogobebe"
Chart (2019)	Position
South Korea (Gaon)	72

== Release history ==
Release history for "Gogobebe"
Region	Date	Format	Label	Ref.
Various	March 14, 2019	Digital download; streaming	RBW; Kakao M	
