= Travel (Mamamoo EP) =

EP by Mamamoo
- Released: November 3, 2020
- Genre: K-pop
- Length: 20:08
- Language: Korean
- Label: RBW

Mamamoo chronology
Reality in Black (2019)	Travel (2020)	WAW (2021)

Singles from Travel
- 1. "Dingga" Released: October 20, 2020; 2. "Aya" Released: November 3, 2020

Travel (stylized in all caps) is the tenth extended play by South Korean girl group Mamamoo. It was released by RBW on November 3, 2020, and distributed by Kakao M. It contains six songs, including pre-released single "Dingga" and the second single "Aya".

== Background and release ==
On November 13, 2019, Mamamoo released their second Korean full-length studio album Reality in Black. The album became the group's best selling effort to date, peaking atop the Circle Album Chart and becoming their first album to surpass 100,000 physical copies sold. The album's lead single "Hip" also became a commercial success, peaking at number four on the Circle Digital Chart and staying in the top ten for 13 weeks. After the promotions for the album concluded, RBW CEO Kim Do-hoon announced in January 2020 that the group would mainly focus on solo activities for the upcoming year. These activities included the release of Moonbyul's debut EP Dark Side of the Moon on February 14 (and its subsequent reissue, Moon, on May 29), Solar's debut single album Spit It Out on April 23, and Hwasa's debut EP María on June 29. Hwasa later joined the cast of Munhwa Broadcasting Corporation show Hangout with Yoo in August 2020. On the show, she became a member of the supergroup Refund Sisters along with Uhm Jung-hwa, Lee Hyori and Jessi. Their debut single, "Don't Touch Me," released in October, reached the peak position of the Circle Digital Chart.

On October 6, 2020, the EP, its title, the cover, and a release date were announced through Mamamoo's official social media accounts. The promotional roll-out was announced on October 11, consisting of two singles as well as several picture and video teasers. On October 20, pre-release single "Dingga" was released to digital retailers & streaming platforms, and a music video premiered on YouTube. The full EP was released to both physical and digital retailers and streaming platforms on November 3, 2020. A music video for the second single, "Aya", was released simultaneously.

The Japanese edition of Travel was announced on November 25, 2020, and was released on February 3, 2021. It includes the Japanese versions of singles "Dingga" and "Aya" as well as an original Japanese song, "Just Believe in Love."

== Promotion ==
In order to promote Travel, Mamamoo starred in their own hour-long comeback show, titled Monologue, which aired on South Korean music television channel Mnet on November 3, 2020. The broadcast featured several Mamamoo performances, interspersed with monologues from the members. The "Monologue" show served as one of the prizes the group has received from winning the competition show Queendom the year prior. Additionally, the group performed the EP's two singles on several South Korean music shows, including M Countdown, Music Bank, Show! Music Core, Inkigayo, and You Hee-yeol's Sketchbook.

=== Singles ===
"Dingga" (Korean: 딩가딩가) was released as the EP's lead single on October 20, 2020. The single has peaked at number seven on the Circle Digital Chart, five on the Billboard Korea K-Pop Hot 100, and eight on the Billboard World Digital Songs Sales chart. The music video for the single has 107 million views on YouTube as of December 2022.

"Aya" was released as the second single from Travel on November 3, 2020, in conjunction with the release of the full EP. The single peaked at number 37 on the Circle Digital Chart, number 21 on the Billboard Korea K-Pop Hot 100, and 17 on the Billboard World Digital Songs Sales chart. On November 19, "Aya" earned its first and only music show win on Mnet's M Countdown. As of December 2022, the music video for "Aya," posted simultaneously to Mamamoo's official channel and the 1theK distribution channel, has a combined total of 107 million views.

== Commercial performance ==
Travel debuted at number two on the Circle Album Chart for the 45th issued week of 2020, behind only Monsta X's album Fatal Love. According to the Hanteo sales chart, the EP sold just over 101,000 copies in its first day of release, a personal record for the group. On the monthly edition of the Circle Album chart, Travel placed at number six and sold 164,000 copies, breaking the group's personal record that they set with Reality in Black the previous year. As of February 2021, the album has sold 174,000 copies in South Korea and 14,500 copies in Japan.

On music streaming platform Spotify, Travel has generated over 139 million streams as of December 2022, with the most-streamed tracks being "Dingga" (64 million) and "Aya" (58 million). The EP has accumulated approximately 197.5 million streams on YouTube, when audio and video streams from official sources are combined. (Note: 197,459,963 total streams. Information is complete and up to date as of July 11, 2021. "Dingga" total streams: 100,460,119: Music video (Mamamoo official channel): 55,806,269; Music video (1THEK official distributor channel): 23,080,655; Performance video (Mamamoo official video): 21,573,195; "AYA" total streams: 93,590,639: Music video (Mamamoo official channel): 64,756,220; Music video (1THEK official distributor channel): 6,528,914; Performance video (Mamamoo official video): 22,305,505; Album tracks total streams: 3,409,205: "Travel" – 1,249,382; "Chuck" – 1,087,916; "Diamond" – 514,708; "Good Night" – 557,199)

== Track listing ==
Standard Edition
No.	Title	Lyrics	Music	Arrangement	Length
1.	"Travel"	Kim Do-hoon; Park Woo-sang; Moonbyul	Kim Do-hoon; Park Woo-sang	Kim Do-hoon; Park Woo-sang	3:32
2.	"Dingga" (딩가딩가)	Kim Do-hoon; Park Woo-sang; Moonbyul	Kim Do-hoon; Park Woo-sang; Hwasa	Kim Do-hoon; Park Woo-sang	2:59
3.	"Aya"	Kim Do-hoon; Lee Sang-Ho; Moonbyul	Kim Do-hoon; Lee Sang-Ho; Moonbyul	Kim Do-hoon; Lee Sang-Ho; Minky	3:31
4.	"Chuck" (척)	Kim Do-hoon; TENTEN; Moonbyul	Kim Do-hoon; TENTEN	TENTEN	3:17
5.	"Diamond"	Kim Eana; Park Woo-sang	Kim Do-hoon; Park Woo-sang	Kim Do-hoon	2:40
6.	"Good Night" (잘자)	Jeon Dawoon; Coco Tofu Dad; Moonbyul	Jeon Dawoon; Coco Tofu Dad	Jeon Dawoon; Coco Tofu Dad	4:09
Total length:					20:08

Physical Edition
No.	Title	Lyrics	Music	Arrangement	Length
7.	"Wanna Be Myself" (나는 안다르다)	Cosmic Sound; Cosmic Girl	Cosmic Sound; Cosmic Girl	Cosmic Sound; Cosmic Girl	3:24
Total length:					23:32

Japanese Edition
No.	Title	Lyrics	Music	Arrangement	Length
8.	"AYA (Japanese Version)"	Kim Do-hoon; Lee Sang-ho; Moonbyul	Kim Do-hoon; Lee Sang-ho; Moonbyul	Kim Do-hoon; Lee Sang-ho; Minky	3:31
9.	"Dingga (Japanese Version)"	Kim Do-hoon; Park Woo-sang; Moonbyul	Kim Do-hoon; Park Woo-sang; Hwasa	Kim Do-hoon; Park Woo-sang	2:59
10.	"Just Believe In Love"	Yu-ki Kokubo; Lauren Kaori; Moonbyul	Yu-ki Kokubo; Lauren Kaori; StoneBridge; Axel Hallstorm; Damien Hall		2:48

== Charts ==
=== Weekly charts ===
Chart (2020–2021)	Peak position
Japanese Albums (Oricon)	4
Japan Hot Albums (Billboard Japan)	5
South Korean Albums (Gaon)	2

=== Year-end charts ===
Chart (2020)	Position
South Korean Albums (Gaon)	50

== Accolades ==
Music program awards
Song	Program	Date	Ref.
"Aya"	M Countdown	November 19, 2020	

Awards and Nominations
Year	Organization	Nominee	Category	Result	Ref.
2021	Golden Disc Awards	Travel	Album Division Bonsang	Nominated	
2021	Seoul Music Awards	"Dingga"	Main Award	Nominated	

== Release history ==
Release formats for Travel
Region	Date	Format	Version	Label	Ref.
South Korea	November 3, 2020	CD	Standard	RBW; Kakao M	
Various	November 3, 2020	Digital download; streaming	Standard	RBW; Kakao M	
Japan	February 3, 2021	CD	Japanese	Victor Entertainment	
