= Reality in Black =

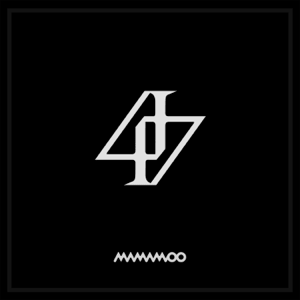
- Digital cover

Studio album by Mamamoo
- Released: November 14, 2019
- Genres: K-pop; dance-pop; hip hop
- Length: 36:52
- Language: Korean
- Label: RBW

Mamamoo chronology
White Wind (2019)	Reality in Black (2019)	Travel (2020)

Singles from Reality in Black
- 1. "Hip" Released: November 14, 2019

Reality in Black (stylized as reality in BLACK) is the second Korean studio album (third overall) by South Korean girl group Mamamoo. It was released by RBW on November 14, 2019, and distributed by Kakao M. Mamamoo collaborated with several producers and songwriters for the album, including longtime partners Kim Do-hoon and Park Woo-sang, who co-wrote the single "Hip" alongside Mamamoo member Hwasa. Musically a K-pop album with R&B, dance, and hip hop influences, Reality in Black features eleven songs in total, including lead single "Hip" and their Queendom finale song "Destiny."

The album debuted atop the Gaon Album Chart in South Korea, becoming Mamamoo's third number-one album in their home country. It also charted in the United States, reaching number 11 on the Billboard World Albums chart.

== Background and release ==
In March 2019, Mamamoo released their ninth EP, White Wind, which served as the fourth and final installment of their "Four Seasons, Four Colors" series of albums. Shortly after, they embarked on their fifth concert tour 4Seasons F/W, which saw them visit Japan, Taiwan, and Hong Kong in addition to their native South Korea. In July 2019, it was announced that Mamamoo would join the cast of Queendom, a competitive reality television show, in which six trending female K-pop acts competed for their own comeback showcase to air on South Korean pay TV channel Mnet. The song "Destiny" was released within the frame of the competition and later included on the album. On October 31, during the last episode of Queendom, Mamamoo were declared the winners of the competition.

On November 1, the impending release of the group's second full studio album was announced through Mamamoo's official social media accounts. The next day, the title, album cover and release date were revealed through the group's official Twitter account. BLACK was also revealed to partially be an acronym for "Bless Life and Carry Knowledge." Multiple concept pictures of the individual members and video teasers led up to the release of the album on November 14, showing the members in several alternate universe settings in which they were not part of Mamamoo.

Reality in Black was released in full to digital and physical retailers on November 14, 2019. The Japanese edition of the album, featuring the Japanese-language version of "Hip" and the original Japanese song "Shampoo," was released on March 11, 2020.

== Promotion ==
=== Single ===
"Hip" was released as the lead single from Reality in Black on November 14, 2019, coinciding with the release of the album itself. An uptempo dance-pop track with both jazz and hip hop influences, "Hip" saw worldwide commercial success. In the group's native South Korea, it debuted at number 20 on the Gaon Digital Chart, number two on the component Gaon Download Chart, and number 38 on the component Gaon Streaming Chart for the 46th issued week of 2019. It would go on to peak at number four on the Gaon Digital Chart in its third week on the chart. "Hip" would later go on to be certified platinum by the Korea Music & Content Association (KMCA) for surpassing 100 million streams in November 2020, earning the group their second certification after "Starry Night" in 2018. Following a top-five debut, "Hip" peaked at number one on the Billboard World Digital Songs Sales chart, making it the group's first number-one on the chart.

=== Other songs ===
The album also includes the song "Destiny," which was released on October 25, 2019, as their final song from the Queendom TV series. It reached number 68 in South Korea and peaked at number seven on the US World Digital Songs Sales chart.

== Commercial performance ==
Reality in Black experienced commercial success upon its release. It debuted and peaked at number one on the Gaon Digital Chart in South Korea, becoming their third number-one album after Yellow Flower (2018) and White Wind (2019). The album became their best-selling to date, with 102,171 copies sold in November 2019 and over 120,000 copies sold as of October 2020. The album debuted at number 12 on the Billboard World Albums chart, peaking at number 11 the next week, with over 1,000 copies sold. Following the 2020 release of the Japanese edition, Reality in Black peaked at number 27 on the Oricon Albums Chart in Japan.

== Track listing ==
Reality in Black – Standard edition
No.	Title	Lyrics	Music	Arrangement	Length
1.	"Destiny" (우린 결국 다시 만날 운명이었지; urin gyeolguk dasi mannal unmyeong-ieossji; lit: "We were meant to meet again eventually")	Kim Do-hoon; Park Woo-sang	Kim Do-hoon; Park Woo-sang	Kim Do-hoon; Park Woo-sang	4:07
2.	"Universe"	Cosmic Sound; Cosmic Girl; Moonbyul	Cosmic Sound; Cosmic Girl	Cosmic Sound; Cosmic Girl	3:35
3.	"Ten Nights" (열 밤; yeol bam)	Won Yeon-jeong; Kim Hyun-A; Hwang Seong-jin	Coco Tofu Dad; Jang Jin-yeong; Hwang Seong-jin	Coco Tofu Dad; Hwang Seong-jin	3:37
4.	"Hip"	Kim Do-hoon; Park Woo-sang; Hwasa	Kim Do-hoon; Park Woo-sang; Hwasa	Kim Do-hoon; Park Woo-sang	3:18
5.	"4x4ever"	Lee Sang-ho; IGGY; Yongbae; Moonbyul	Lee Sang-ho; IGGY; Yongbae; Mayu Wakisaka	IGGY; Yongbae	3:04
6.	"Better"	Cosmic Sound; Cosmic Girl; Moonbyul	Cosmic Sound; Cosmic Girl	Cosmic Sound; Cosmic Girl	3:16
7.	"Hello Mama"	Yongbae; Lee Woo-sang; Moonbyul	Yongbae; Lee Woo-sang	Lee Woo-sang	3:39
8.	"ZzZz" (심심해; simsimhae; lit: "Boring")	Lee Woo-sang; Ryu Jisoo; Moonbyul	Lee Woo-sang; Ryu Jisoo	Lee Woo-sang	3:25
9.	"Reality"	Park Woo-sang	Park Woo-sang	Yeong	3:03
10.	"High Tension" (춤을 춰; chum-eul chwo; lit: "Dance")	Jarry Potter; Moonbyul	Park Hae-il; Jarry Potter; Big Sancho	Park Hae-il; Big Sancho	3:18
11.	"I'm Your Fan"	Solar	Solar	Mingki	2:27
Total length:					36:52

Reality in Black – Japanese edition
No.	Title	Lyrics	Music	Arrangement	Length
12.	"Hip" (Japanese Version)	Kim Do-hoon; Park Woo-sang; Hwasa	Kim Do-hoon; Park Woo-sang; Hwasa	Kim Do-hoon; Park Woo-sang	3:18
13.	"Shampoo"	Eri Osanai; Moonbyul; Im Sang-hyuck; Coco Tofu Dad; SUKA	Im Sang-hyuck; Coco Tofu Dad		3:15
Total length:					43:25

Reality in Black – Japanese Limited Edition DVD Typ A
No.	Title	Length
1.	"MAMAMOO 2nd Concert Tour in JAPAN: 4season Final"

Reality in Black – Japanese Limited Edition DVD Typ B
No.	Title	Length
1.	"Hip (Japanese Version)" (Music Video)

Samples

- "Universe" contains an uncredited sample of "NASA" by Ariana Grande, written by Grande, Victoria Monét, Taylor Parks, Tommy Brown and Charles Anderson.

== Charts ==
=== Weekly charts ===
Weekly chart performance for Reality in Black
Chart (2019–2020)	Peak position
Japanese Albums (Oricon)	27
South Korean Albums (Gaon)	1
US World Albums (Billboard)	11

=== Monthly charts ===
Monthly chart performance for Reality in Black
Chart (2019)	Peak position
South Korean Albums (Gaon)	4

=== Year-end charts ===
Year-end chart performance for Reality in Black
Chart (2019)	Position
South Korean Albums (Gaon)	53

== Release history ==
Release history for Reality in Black
Region	Date	Format	Label	Ref.
Various	November 14, 2019	CD; Digital download; streaming	RBW; Kakao M	
