= Aya (song) =

2020 single by Mamamoo

Single by Mamamoo

from the EP Travel
- Language: Korean
- Released: November 3, 2020
- Recorded: 2020
- Studio: RBW Studio
- Genre: K-pop
- Length: 3:31
- Label: RBW
- Composers: Kim Do-hoon; Lee Sang-ho; Mingkey
- Lyricists: Kim Do-hoon; Lee Sang-ho; Moonbyul

Mamamoo singles chronology
"Dingga" (2020)	"Aya" (2020)	"Where Are We Now" (2021)

Music video
- "Aya" on YouTube

"Aya" (stylized in all caps) is a song by South Korean girl group Mamamoo. It was released on November 3, 2020, as the second single from the group's tenth extended play (EP), Travel. Released by RBW, was written by Kim Do-hoon, Lee Sang-ho, and Moonbyul and produced by the former two alongside Mingkey. A Japanese-language version of the song was released in January 2021.

== Background and release ==
In October 2020, Mamamoo's record label RBW announced that the group would be making a comeback in November with their tenth mini-album Travel. On October 6, the EP, its title, the cover, and a release date were announced through Mamamoo's official social media accounts. The promotional roll-out was announced on October 11, consisting of two singles as well as several picture and video teasers. The EP's first and only pre-release single, "Dingga", was released on October 20. On October 27, a music video teaser was released via the group's official YouTube channel. "Aya" was released in tandem with its parent EP on November 3, 2020.

The Japanese-language version of the song was released by Victor Entertainment on January 26, 2021, as the second single from the Japan edition of Travel.

== Composition ==
Musically, "Aya" is a pop and K-pop song with influences of Arabic music. The song is composed at an average tempo of 90 beats per minute in the key of A minor. "Aya" follows a chord progression of Am-E-F-C for most of the song followed by Am-E during the outro section.

== Promotion ==
In order to promote "Aya" and its parent EP Travel, Mamamoo performed in their own hour-long comeback show, titled "Monologue," which aired on South Korean music television channel Mnet on November 3, 2020. The broadcast featured several Mamamoo performances, interspersed with monologues from the members. The "Monologue" show served as one of the prizes the group has received from winning the competition show Queendom the year prior. The group first performed it on a music show on November 5, performing the song on Mnet's M Countdown.

=== Music video ===
The official music video was released to Mamamoo's official YouTube channel and the 1theK distribution channel on November 3, 2020. Described as a "180-degree flip" from their previous single and music video for "Dingga", the video received positive reception for showing the group's "alluringly fierce side". As of June 2022, the music video has a combined total of 98.75 million views and 2.26 million likes on both channels. A dance-focused performance video was released for the song on November 7 and has over 33 million views as of June 2022.

The music video for the Japanese version of the song was released on January 26, 2021, to Mamamoo's official Japan-focused channel.

== Commercial performance ==
In South Korea, the song debuted at number 42 on the weekly Gaon Digital Chart, peaking at number 37 the following week. The song also peaked at number 21 on the Billboard K-pop Hot 100, remaining on the chart for 15 total weeks. Outside of South Korea, "Aya" peaked at number 27 in Singapore and number 17 on the Billboard World Digital Song Sales chart.

== Accolades ==
Music program awards
Network	Program	Date	Ref.
Mnet	M Countdown	November 19, 2020	

== Charts ==
=== Weekly charts ===
Weekly chart performance for "Aya"
Chart (2020)	Peak position
Singapore (RIAS)	27
South Korea (Gaon)	37
South Korea (K-pop Hot 100)	21
US World Digital Song Sales (Billboard)	17

=== Monthly charts ===
Monthly chart performance for "Aya"
Chart (2020)	Peak position
South Korea (Gaon)	42

== Release history ==
Release history for "Aya"
Region	Date	Format	Version	Label	Ref.
Various	November 3, 2020	Digital download; streaming	Korean	RBW; Kakao M	
Japan	January 26, 2021	Digital download; streaming	Japanese	Victor Entertainment	
