= Dingga =

2020 single by Mamamoo

Single by Mamamoo

from the EP Travel
- Language: Korean; Japanese
- Released: October 20, 2020
- Recorded: 2020
- Studio: RBW Studio
- Genre: K-pop; disco; dance-pop
- Length: 2:59
- Label: RBW
- Composers: Kim Do-hoon; Park Woo-sang; Hwasa
- Lyricists: Kim Do-hoon; Park Woo-sang; Moonbyul

Mamamoo singles chronology
"Hip" (2019)	"Dingga" (2020)	"Aya" (2020)

Music video
- "Dingga" on YouTube

"Dingga" (Korean: 딩가딩가; RR: dingga dingga) is a song by South Korean girl group Mamamoo. It was released on October 20, 2020, as the lead single from the group's tenth extended play (EP), Travel. A disco and dance-pop song, "Dingga" was written by Kim Do-hoon, Park Woo-sang, and Moonbyul and produced by the former two along with Hwasa. The song was met with positive reception and became a top-ten hit in South Korea and on the Billboard World Digital Songs Sales chart.

== Background and release ==
Following the release of the promotional single "Wanna Be Myself" for Mamamoo's campaign with athletic clothing brand Andar in September, Mamamoo announced the impending release of their tenth EP Travel that November 2020. They revealed that they would be releasing a pre-release digital single titled "Dingga" on October 20, two weeks ahead of the EP itself. Korean media outlet Dispatch reported that Mamamoo's agency, RBW, remarked that with "hard times like this, we are in needs of Vitamin D. As we can’t get enough at the outside, Mamamoo will bring the Vitamin D [through] music," in reference to the vitamin D sign shown in an October 16 concept photo. The song was released to digital retailers alongside its instrumental version on October 20, 2020.

The Japanese version of the song was released to digital retailers on January 20, 2021.

== Composition ==
"Dingga" is a K-pop, disco, and dance-pop song composed by Kim Do-hoon, Park Woo-sang, and Hwasa. The Korean version runs for two minutes and 59 seconds, while the Japanese version runs for three minutes and one second. It is composed in the key of A minor and at the tempo of 120 BPM. The title represents either the Korean expression for the "act of lazily enjoying one’s free time" or Korean onomatopoeic phrase for the sound a guitar makes. Lyrical themes of the song includes those of isolation, quarantine, and wanting to have fun during the COVID-19 pandemic. During an interview with Korean media outlet TVing, Mamamoo described the song as one "that expresses the desire to play 'Dinga Dinga' together in times when we have to maintain social distancing and live lonely daily lives."

== Promotion and live performances ==
As it was considered a "pre-release single," the group did not attend weekly music shows to promote the single upon its release. The first televised performance of the song occurred came on November 3, 2020 as part of their Mnet comeback show Monologue, which serves as the prize they earned for winning 2019 reality-competition show Queendom. Following the release of the Travel EP, they performed it several music programs, including M Countdown on November 5, Music Bank on November 6, and Show! Music Core on November 7. On December 6, they performed it, along with "Aya" at the 2020 Mnet Asian Music Awards. Mamamoo performed "Dingga" on March 28, 2021 as part of their KCON:TACT Season 3 performance on the final day of the online festival.

=== Music video ===
The official music video for "Dingga" was uploaded to YouTube on October 20, 2020 at 6:00 PM KST, in conjunction with the release of the single itself. Like several of their previous singles, the clip was posted to both the group's official channel and the 1theK distribution channel. Teen Vogue described it as "punchy" and "fun," featuring scenes including "roller derby, diners, and arcades as the members joyfully dance and hang out with each other." As of September 2021, the music video has garnered over 84.32 million views at 2.6 million likes on YouTube. The official dance performance video was uploaded on October 22.

The music video for the song's Japanese version was published through the Mamamoo Japan Official YouTube channel on February 1, 2021, featuring the same scenes as the original video except rerecorded in Japanese.

== Commercial performance ==
The song debuted at number 20 on the Gaon Digital Chart for the 43rd issued week of 2020. In its fourth week of charting, it peaked at number seven. The song also peaked at number five on the Billboard Korea K-pop Hot 100. "Dingga" debuted at number 75 on the Billboard Japan Hot 100 and peaked at number 58 in February 2021, following the release of the Japanese version of the song. The song also peaked at number 21 on the RIAS Top Streaming Chart in Singapore. and debuted and peaked at number eight on the Billboard World Digital Songs Sales chart, on the chart issue dated October 31, 2020, spending three weeks on the chart. It thus became the group's ninth top-ten entry on the chart.

== Accolades ==
Year-end publications
Critic/publication	List	Rank	Ref.
BuzzFeed	Best K-Pop Songs of 2020	25	
Metro	The Best K-Pop Comebacks of 2020	5	

== Track listing ==
Digital download and streaming

1. "Dingga" – 2:59
2. "Dingga (Inst.)" – 2:59

Digital download and streaming

1. "Dingga -Japanese Ver.-" – 3:01

== Credits and personnel ==
Adapted from album liner notes.

=== Studio locations ===
- Recorded at RBW Studio (Seoul, South Korea)
- Mixed at CUBE Studio (Seoul, South Korea)
- Mastered at 821 Sound Mastering (Seoul, South Korea)

=== Personnel ===
- Mamamoo – lead vocals, chorus
  - Moonbyul – lyrics
  - Hwasa – composition
- Kim Do-hoon – lyrics, composition, arrangement, synthesizer, drum programming, recording
- Park Woo-sang – lyrics, composition, arrangement, piano, synthesizer, drum programming, chorus, recording
- Young – guitar
- Jo-ssi Ahjussi – mixing
- Jeon Bu-yeon – mixing assistant
- Kwon Nam-woo – mastering

== Charts ==
=== Weekly charts ===
Weekly chart performance for "Dingga"
Chart (2020)	Peak position
Japan (Japan Hot 100)	58
Singapore (RIAS)	21
South Korea (Gaon)	7
South Korea (K-pop Hot 100)	5
US World Digital Song Sales (Billboard)	8

=== Monthly charts ===
Monthly chart performance for "Dingga"
Chart (2020)	Peak position
South Korea (Gaon)	7

=== Year-end charts ===
2020 year-end chart performance for "Dingga"
Chart (2020)	Position
South Korea (Gaon)	154

2021 year-end chart performance for "Dingga"
Chart (2021)	Position
South Korea (Gaon)	116

== Release history ==
Release history for "Dingga"
Region	Date	Format	Version	Label	Ref.
Various	October 20, 2020	Digital download; streaming	Korean	RBW; Kakao M	
Japan	January 18, 2021	Digital download; streaming	Japanese	Victor Entertainment	
