= White Wind (EP) =

2019 extended play by Mamamoo

EP by Mamamoo
- Released: March 14, 2019
- Genre: K-pop
- Length: 22:03
- Language: Korean
- Label: RBW

Mamamoo chronology
Blue;s (2018)	White Wind (2019)	Reality in Black (2019)

Singles from White Wind
- 1. "Gogobebe" Released: March 14, 2019

White Wind is the ninth extended play by South Korean girl group Mamamoo. It was released by RBW on March 14, 2019, and distributed by Kakao M. It contains seven songs, including its lead single "Gogobebe". The EP is the fourth and final album under the 4 Seasons, 4 Colors project.

== Background and release ==
On January 4, 2018, Mamamoo released the digital single "Paint Me" and introduced the project 4 Seasons, 4 Colors. The group planned on releasing four EPs within the following year, with each EP being representative of a season and a member of Mamamoo. The member in focus will be featured in a solo track on the respective EPs, along with having a personal color assigned to represent themselves. The first installment of the project, Yellow Flower, was released on March 8, 2018, followed up by the EPs Red Moon on June 16 and Blue;s on November 29 respectively.

On February 28, 2019, the EP and its title were announced through Mamamoo's official Twitter account, along with the planned promotional roll-out. The EP focuses on member Wheein, who chose white as her color, the represented season is Winter. On March 14, the EP was released to various physical and digital retailers, as well as streaming platforms. Lead single "Gogobebe" and a correlating music video were released on the same day. A music video for Wheein's solo track 25 was released on May 25.

== Track listing ==
No.	Title	Lyrics	Music	Arrangement	Length
1.	"Where R You"	Cosmic Sound; Cosmic Girl; Moonbyul	Cosmic Sound; Cosmic Girl	Cosmic Sound; Cosmic Girl	3:08
2.	"Gogobebe" (고고베베)	Kim Do-hoon; Solar; Moonbyul	Kim Gun-mo; Kim Do-hoon	Kim Do-hoon	3:15
3.	"Waggy" (쟤가 걔야)	Kim Do-hoon; Moonbyul	Kim Do-hoon	Kim Do-hoon	3:12
4.	"25" (Wheein solo)	Park Woo-sang; Wheein	Park Woo-sang	Park Woo-sang	3:22
5.	"Bad Bye"	B.O.; Moonbyul	Jeon Da-woon; B.O.	Jeon Da-woon; Jeong Da-lim; Jang Dae-il	4:33
6.	"My Star"	Cosmic Sound; Cosmic Girl; Moonbyul	Cosmic Sound; Cosmic Girl	Cosmic Sound; Cosmic Girl	3:11
7.	"4season" (Outro)	Park Woo-sang	Park Woo-sang	Park Woo-sang	1:22
Total length:					22:09

== Charts ==
=== Album ===
==== Weekly charts ====
Chart (2019)	Peak position
French Download Albums (SNEP)	101
South Korean Albums (Gaon)	1
US World Albums (Billboard)	5

==== Monthly charts ====
Chart (2019)	Peak position
South Korean Albums (Gaon)	6

==== Year-end charts ====
Chart (2019)	Position
South Korean Albums (Gaon)	78

== Accolades ==
Awards and nominations
Organization	Year	Category	Nominee	Result	Ref.
Seoul Music Awards	2019	Bonsang Award	White Wind	Won	
