= Blue;s =

- Digital cover

EP by Mamamoo
- Released: November 29, 2018
- Recorded: 2018
- Studio: RBW Studio
- Genre: K-pop
- Length: 19:30
- Language: Korean
- Label: RBW

Mamamoo chronology
| Red Moon (2018) | Blue;s (2018) | White Wind (2019) |

Singles from Blue;s
- 1. "Wind Flower" Released: November 29, 2018

Blue;s (stylized as BLUE;S) is the eighth extended play by South Korean girl group Mamamoo. It was released by RBW on November 29, 2018 and distributed by LOEN Entertainment. The EP consists of six songs, including the lead single "Wind Flower" and member Solar's solo track "Hello." Blue;s is the third album under the 4 Seasons, 4 Colors project.

== Promotion ==
=== Single ===
"Wind Flower" was released as the EP's lead single in conjunction with the EP itself on November 29, 2018. A "comforting" breakup song, "Wind Flower" peaked at number nine on the Gaon Digital Chart and 10 on the Billboard Korea K-Pop Hot 100. It also peaked at number 16 on the Billboard World Digital Songs Sales chart in the United States. Mamamoo first performed the song on MBC's Show! Music Core on December 1, 2018. The music video for the single, released in conjunction with the song, was posted simultaneously to Mamamoo's official YouTube channel and the 1theK distribution channel and has 74 million combined views as of December 2022.

=== Other songs ===
Though not released as a single, Mamamoo performed "No More Drama," the second track on the album, on several occasions, including on SBS MTV's The Show on December 4 and MBC Music's Show Champion on December 5.

== Track listing ==
| No. | Title | Lyrics | Music | Arrangement | Length |
|---|---|---|---|---|---|
| 1. | "From Autumn to Winter" (가을에서 겨울로) (intro) | Kim Do-hoon | Do-hoon | Do-hoon | 1:37 |
| 2. | "No More Drama" | Do-hoon; Moonbyul; Solar | Do-hoon; Moonbyul; Solar | Do-hoon | 3:11 |
| 3. | "Wind Flower" | Do-hoon; Moonbyul; Park Woo-sang | Do-hoon; Woo-sang | Do-hoon; Woo-sang | 3:57 |
| 4. | "Hello" (Solar solo) | Solar | Solar | Do-hoon; Mingky | 3:17 |
| 5. | "Better Than I Thought" (생각보단 괜찮아) | Moonbyul; Lee Hoo-sang | Hoo-sang | Hoo-sang | 3:23 |
| 6. | "Morning" | Moonbyul; Woo-sang | Woo-sang | Woo-sang | 4:05 |
| Total length: | | | | | 19:30 |

=== Notes ===
- "No More Drama," "Wind Flower," and "Better Than I Thought" are stylized in sentence case.
- "From Autumn to Winter" is known simply as "Intro" on international digital platforms, including Spotify and Apple Music.

== Commercial performance ==
Blue;s debuted at number seven on the Gaon Album Chart. It fell to number 12 in its second week, and it fell again to number 58 in its third. The EP sold 39,148 physical copies for the month of November 2018 and 6,345 copies in December 2018. In 2018, it sold 45,493 total copies, placing at number 99 on the year-end edition of the Gaon Album Chart. As of 2020, the EP has sold 59,568 total copies in South Korea. Blue;s also entered the charts in France, peaking at number 173 on the now-defunct SNEP Downloaded Albums chart.

== Charts ==
=== Weekly charts ===
| Chart (2018) | Peak position |
|---|---|
| French Download Albums (SNEP) | 173 |
| South Korean Albums (Gaon) | 7 |

=== Monthly charts ===
| Chart (2018) | Peak position |
|---|---|
| South Korean Albums (Gaon) | 17 |

=== Year-end charts ===
| Chart (2018) | Position |
|---|---|
| South Korean Albums (Gaon) | 99 |
