= Wind Flower =

- Japanese version regular and digital cover

Single by Mamamoo

from the EP Blue;s and the album 4colors
- Language: Korean; Japanese
- B-side: "Sleep Talk" (Japanese)
- Released: November 29, 2018 (Korean); February 6, 2019 (Japanese)
- Studio: RBW Studio
- Genre: K-pop
- Length: 3:56
- Label: RBW
- Songwriter(s): Kim Do-hoon; Park Woo-sang
- Lyricist(s): Kim Do-hoon; Park Woo-sang; Moonbyul

Mamamoo singles chronology
"Egotistic" (2018)	"Wind Flower" (2018)	"Gogobebe" (2019)

Music video
- "Wind Flower" on YouTube "Wind Flower" (Japanese version) on YouTube

"Wind Flower" (stylized in sentence case) is a song by South Korean girl group Mamamoo. It was released on November 29, 2018, by RBW as the lead single from the group's eighth extended play (EP), Blue;s. A "comforting" breakup song, "Wind Flower" was produced by Kim Do-hoon and Park Woo-sang and written by them and Mamamoo member Moonbyul. The song became a top-ten hit in South Korea, reaching number nine on the Gaon Digital Chart and ten on the Billboard K-pop Hot 100. The Japanese version of the song was released on February 6, 2019, as their second Japanese single.

== Background and release ==
In 2018, Mamamoo embarked on their Four Seasons, Four Colors series of albums, releasing the commencement single "Paint Me" in January, their sixth EP Yellow Flower in March, and their seventh EP Red Moon in July. On November 7, the group was announced to be coming back with their eighth EP, Blue;s, and a new song. A music video teaser for the single was released on November 22. "Wind Flower" was released digitally alongside its parent EP on November 29, 2018.

The Japanese version of "Wind Flower" was released alongside the B-side "Sleep Talk" as Mamamoo's second Japanese-language single on February 6, 2019. It was later included on the group's debut Japanese album 4colors, which was released in August 2019. A remix of the original Korean version, subtitled the "Dramatic Version", was released on September 15, 2021, as the 17th track on Mamamoo's first compilation album, I Say Mamamoo: The Best.

== Composition ==
Musically, "Wind Flower" is a K-pop and R&B breakup song. The original song runs for three minutes and 56 seconds, while the Japanese version lasts an additional second. Both versions are composed in the key of C major and at a tempo of 114 BPM. The Korea Herald remarked that with "Wind Flower", "Mamamoo gives the exhausted theme of romance gone wrong a groovy makeover" yet still "anything but a cliche." The publication also stated that the song, and the rest of the EP, "bring R&B to the mainstream K-pop scene" and that the genre has "found its best advocate in the K-pop scene." "Wind Flower" has also been called a song that "captures the sentimental sensibility" of the group and displays the "lonely and faint feelings which a person has after separation from a lover."

The Japanese b-side "Sleep Talk" has been described as an "impressive song... that will make [one] feel excited again", as opposed to the typical "J-pop-oriented catchy songs and heart-pounding ballads".

== Commercial performance ==
"Wind Flower" debuted at number 17 on the Gaon Digital Chart, accumulating 18.1 million digital index points for the week ending December 1, 2018. The next week, it peaked at number nine on the chart, with 23.3 million index points. The single peaked at number 20 for the December 2018 monthly issue. Additionally, "Wind Flower" peaked at number 10 on the Billboard Korea K-pop Hot 100 and number 16 on the Billboard World Digital Songs Sales charts. Upon the release of the Japanese version in 2019, the song peaked at number 16 on the Oricon Singles Chart, selling over 7,000 physical copies and charting for two weeks, and number 68 on the Billboard Japan Hot 100.

== Track listing ==
Digital download and streaming

1. "Wind Flower" – 3:56
2. "Wind Flower" (Instrumental) – 3:56

Digital download and streaming

1. "Wind Flower" (Japanese version) – 3:57
2. "Sleep Talk" – 3:08

== Personnel ==
Adapted from EP liner notes.

- Mamamoo – lead vocals, background vocals
  - Moonbyul – lyrics
- Kim Do-Hoon – composition, lyrics, arrangement, guitar
- Park Woo-sang – composition, lyrics, arrangement, piano, brass, drum programming
- Choi-hoon – bass

== Charts ==
=== Weekly charts ===
Weekly chart performance for "Wind Flower"
Chart (2018–2019)	Peak position
Japan (Oricon)	16
Japan (Billboard Japan)	68
South Korea (Gaon)	9
South Korea (K-pop Hot 100)	10
US World Digital Song Sales (Billboard)	16

=== Monthly charts ===
Monthly chart performance for "Wind Flower"
Chart (2018)	Peak position
South Korea (Gaon)	20

== Release history ==
Region	Date	Format	Version	Label	Ref.
Various	November 29, 2018	Digital download; streaming	Korean	RBW; Kakao M	
Japan	February 6, 2019	Digital download; streaming	Japanese	Victor Entertainment	
Various	September 15, 2021	Digital download; streaming	Korean (Dramatic Version)	RBW; Kakao Entertainment	
