= Hip (song) =

2019 single by Mamamoo

Single by Mamamoo

from the album Reality in Black
- Language: Korean
- Released: November 14, 2019
- Studio: RBW Studio
- Genre: K-pop; hip hop; dance-pop
- Length: 3:15
- Label: RBW
- Songwriters: Kim Do-hoon; Park Woo-sang; Hwasa

Mamamoo singles chronology
"Gogobebe" (2019)	"Hip" (2019)	"Dingga" (2020)

Music video
- "Hip" on YouTube

"Hip" (stylized in all caps) is a song by South Korean girl group Mamamoo. It was released on November 14, 2019, as the lead single from the group's third studio album, Reality in Black. A dance-pop song with a retro feel, "Hip" was written and produced by Kim Do-hoon, Park Woo-sang, and Hwasa.

The single was met with positive reception upon release and became a commercial success, peaking within the top ten in South Korea and becoming the group's first number-one hit on the Billboard World Digital Song Sales chart. In November 2020, the song was certified platinum by the Korea Music & Content Association (KMCA) for surpassing 100 million streams, making it their second song to achieve the feat.

== Background and release ==
Beginning in August 2019, Mamamoo participated in the reality-competition show Queendom, in which six trending female K-pop acts competed for their own comeback showcase to air on South Korean pay TV channel Mnet. Throughout the course of the program, Mamamoo released a cover of AOA's 2016 single "Good Luck," a rerecording of their own 2016 single "I Miss You," and the original song "Destiny." "Destiny" was later included on their second studio album Reality in Black. In the finale episode of Queendom, Mamamoo were declared the winners of the competition. The group then announced the release of their second full studio album through their Twitter account on November 1. "Hip" was announced as the album's lead single on November 8, and it was released alongside the album on November 14.

The single was noted as contrasting the group's past self-choreographed performances. Contrary to previous promotional cycles, the group explicitly focused on choreography, exchanging their trademark handheld microphones for headsets. Group leader Solar remarked during an album showcase event that the choreography for "Hip" had been their most complex and hardest to learn so far. While appearing on the KBS talk show Happy Together, she elaborated that this change was inspired by previous criticism over the group not having intricate, demanding dance routines and being self-choreographed.

The Japanese version of the song was released on February 5, 2020.

== Composition and lyrics ==
"Hip" is a pop and dance-pop song with swing and hip hop influences, noted by Billboard as a "powerful, anthemic melody" and "brassy take-down" of the group's haters. The song features the group's four members singing and rapping over a strong and confident beat. Newsweek reported "Hip" as being "about living a life where you don't care about how other people see you" and "convey[ing] the meaning of valuing yourself and living confidently rather than caring about what others think."

== Music video and promotion ==
The official music video for "Hip" was released on November 14, 2019, through Mamamoo's official YouTube channel. The music video went viral and would later become their first to surpass 200 million views, achieving the feat on December 16, 2020. As of August 2024, the video has amassed over 422 million views and 5.3 million likes, being the group's highest-viewed video. The official performance video for the song was released on November 18 and has 59 million views as of February 2022.

Mamamoo first performed "Hip" at their album showcase on November 14, 2019, as reported by The Korea Herald. The first televised performance of the song occurred November 15 on KBS Music Bank, followed by performances on MBC Show! Music Core on November 16 and SBS Inkigayo on November 17. The group performed "Hip" alongside their Queendom finale song "Destiny" at the 2019 V Live Heartbeat Awards. They then performed at several year-end festivals and award shows, including the SBS Gayo Daejeon festival on December 4 and the KBS Song Festival on December 27. On December 5, they performed a remixed version of the song at the 2019 Mnet Asian Music Awards in Nagoya, Japan. With nearly 60 million views and over 1.4 million likes as of September 2021, the official performance video is the most-viewed performance of the ceremony.

== Commercial performance ==
The single debuted at number 20 on the Gaon Digital Chart for the 46th issued week of 2019. It would go on to peak at number four in its third week on the chart. "Hip" would later go on to be certified platinum by the Korea Music & Content Association (KMCA) for surpassing 100 million streams in November 2020, earning the group their second certification after "Starry Night" in 2018. Elsewhere in Asia, "Hip" peaked at number 39 in Japan, becoming their first top-40 hit in the region, and at number 14 in Singapore.

The single debuted at number five on the Billboard World Digital Songs Sales chart, before peaking atop the chart the next week, moving around 2,000 downloads in the United States. This made it the group's first song to top the chart and made them the tenth K-pop act (and fourth female act) to top both the World Digital Songs Sales and World Albums charts, doing so with "Hip" (2019) and Purple (2017), respectively.

According to the Circle Global K-Pop Chart, "Hip" was the 162nd most-streamed K-pop song globally in 2022, three years after its initial release.

== Accolades ==
Year-end listicles
Critic/publication	List	Rank	Ref.
Amazon Music	Best of 2020: K-Pop	7	
BuzzFeed	30 Songs that Helped Define K-Pop in 2019	1	
BuzzFeed	37 of the Best K-Pop Songs of 2019, According to Fans	9	

Awards and nominations
Year	Organization	Award	Result	Ref.
2020	Gaon Chart Music Awards	Song of the Year - November	Nominated	
2020	Mnet Asian Music Awards	Best Vocal Performance – Group	Won	
2020	Mnet Asian Music Awards	Song of the Year	Nominated	
2021	Golden Disc Awards	Best Digital Song (Bonsang)	Won	

Music program awards
Program	Date	Ref.
M Countdown	November 21, 2019	
M Countdown	November 28, 2019	
Music Bank	November 22, 2019	
Inkigayo	November 24, 2019	
Inkigayo	December 22, 2019	
Inkigayo	December 29, 2019	
Show Champion	December 4, 2019	

== Track listing ==
Digital download and streaming

1. "Hip" – 3:15
2. "Hip (Instrumental)" – 3:15

Digital download and streaming

1. "Hip -Japanese Ver.-" – 3:15

== Credits and personnel ==
Adapted from album liner notes.

Locations

- Recorded at RBW Studio
- Mixed at RBW Studio
- Mastered at 821 Sound Mastering

Personnel

- Mamamoo – lead vocals, background vocals (Note: Also called "chorus" in liner notes.)
  - Hwasa – lyrics, composition
- Kim Do-hoon – lyrics, composition, arrangement, guitar, synthesizers, drum programming, recording
- Park Woo-sang – lyrics, composition, arrangement, piano, synthesizers, drum programming, background vocals, recording, mixing

== Charts ==
=== Weekly charts ===
2019–2020 weekly chart performance for "Hip"
Chart (2019–2020)	Peak position
Japan (Japan Hot 100)	39
New Zealand Hot Singles (RMNZ)	35
Singapore (RIAS)	14
South Korea (Gaon)	4
South Korea (K-pop Hot 100)	2
US World Digital Song Sales (Billboard)	1

2025 weekly chart performance for "Hip"
Chart (2025)	Peak position
Jamaica Airplay (JAMMS)	10

=== Monthly charts ===
Monthly chart performance for "Hip"
Chart (2020)	Peak position
South Korea (Gaon)	7

=== Year-end charts ===
2019 year-end chart performance for "Hip"
Chart (2019)	Position
South Korea (Gaon)	142

2020 year-end chart performance for "Hip"
Chart (2020)	Position
Japan (Japan Hot 100)	81
South Korea (Gaon)	29

== Sales and certifications ==
Streaming certifications for "Hip"
Region	Certification	Certified units/sales
Japan (RIAJ)	Gold	50,000,000^{†}
South Korea (KMCA)	Platinum	100,000,000^{†}
^{†} Streaming-only figures based on certification alone.

== Release history ==
Release history for "Hip"
Region	Date	Format	Version	Label	Ref.
Various	November 14, 2019	Digital download; streaming	Korean	RBW; Kakao M	
Japan	February 5, 2020	Digital download; streaming	Japanese	Victor Entertainment	
